= List of national baseball teams =

This is a list of men's and women's national baseball teams in the world. It consists of all men's and women's baseball teams representing their nation, country, or territory and which are members of the World Baseball Softball Confederation (WBSC).

== Men's national baseball teams ==
=== Current ===
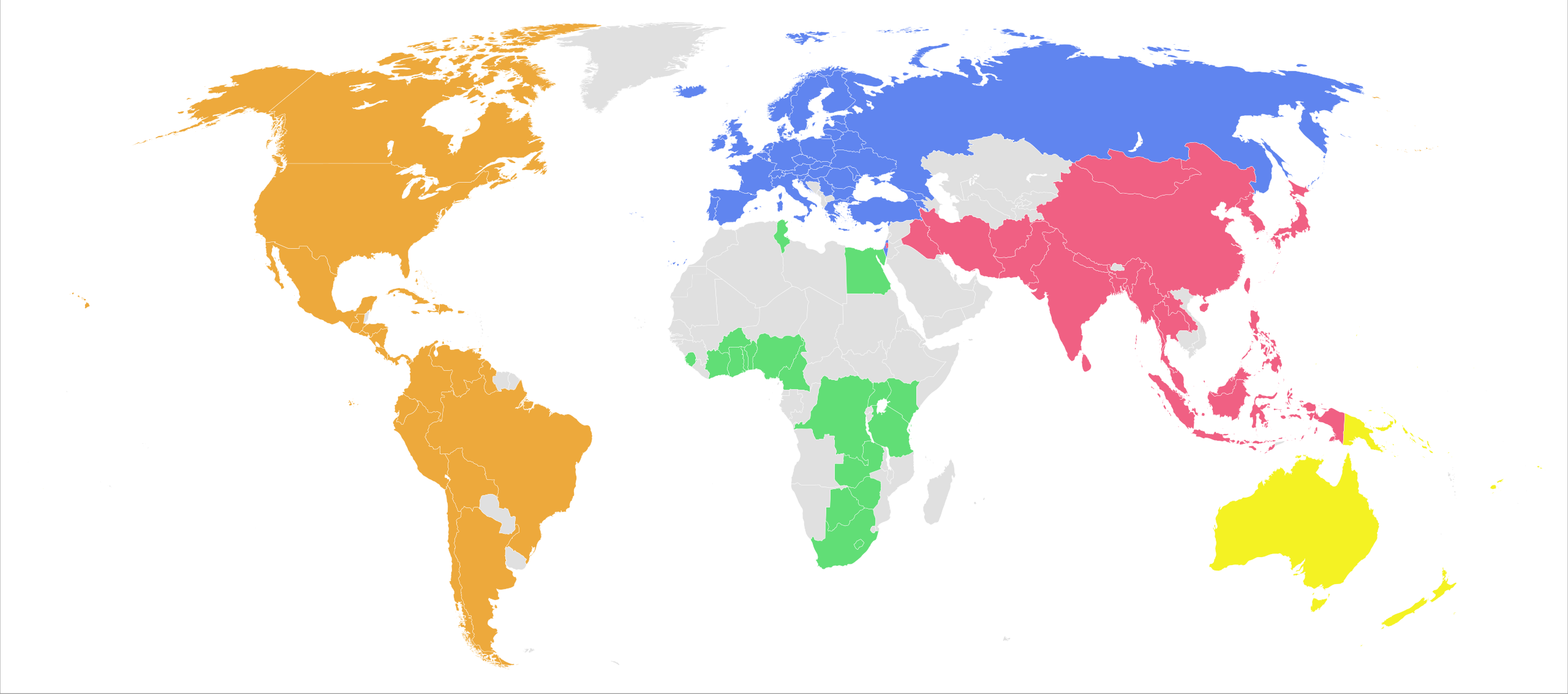
Map of the world with five confederations.

This section lists the current:

- 128 men's national baseball teams associated to WBSC.

The five confederations are:

- Africa — African Baseball & Softball Association (ABSA)
- Americas — Pan American Baseball Confederation (COPABE)
- Asia — Baseball Federation of Asia (BFA)
- Europe — Confederation of European Baseball (CEB)
- Oceania — Baseball Confederation of Oceania (BCO)

The current holder of the World Baseball Classic is marked by 🏆.
Participants World Baseball Classic 2026 marked by in ♣.

==== ABSA (Africa) ====
22 members of the African Baseball & Softball Association under it.

- Benin
- Burkina Faso
- Chad
- Côte d'Ivoire
- Cape Verde
- Egypt
- Ghana
- Guinea
- Kenya
- Lesotho
- Niger
- Nigeria
- Senegal
- Sierra Leone
- South Africa
- South Sudan
- Tanzania
- Tunisia
- Togo
- Uganda
- Zambia
- Zimbabwe

==== BCO (Oceania) ====
13 members of the Baseball Confederation of Oceania under it.

- American Samoa
- Australia♣
- Federated States of Micronesia
- Fiji
- Guam
- Marshall Islands†
- New Caledonia
- New Zealand
- Northern Mariana Islands
- Palau
- Papua New Guinea
- Solomon Islands†
- Tonga

† Provisional members

==== BFA (Asia) ====
28 members of the Baseball Federation of Asia under it.

- Afghanistan
- Bangladesh
- Bhutan
- Brunei
- Cambodia
- China
- Chinese Taipei♣^{1}
- DPR Korea
- Hong Kong
- India
- Indonesia
- Iran
- Iraq
- Japan♣
- Laos
- Korea♣
- Malaysia
- Mongolia
- Myanmar
- Nepal
- Pakistan
- Palestine
- Philippines
- Saudi Arabia
- Singapore
- Sri Lanka
- Thailand
- Uzbekistan

1. Commonly known as 'Taiwan'; competing as 'Chinese Taipei' due geopolitical pressure

==== CEB (Europe) ====
39 members of the Confederation of European Baseball under it.

- Austria
- Belarus^{1}
- Belgium
- Bulgaria
- Croatia
- Cyprus
- Czech Republic♣
- Denmark
- Estonia†
- Finland
- France
- Georgia
- Germany
- Great Britain♣
- Greece
- Hungary
- Iceland†
- Ireland
- Israel♣
- Italy♣
- Kosovo
- Latvia
- Lithuania
- Malta
- Moldova
- Netherlands♣
- Norway
- Poland
- Portugal
- Romania
- Russia^{1}
- San Marino
- Serbia
- Slovakia
- Slovenia
- Sweden
- Switzerland
- Turkey
- Ukraine

1. Russia and Belarus were suspended by the WBSC due to their invasion of Ukraine
† Provisional members

==== COPABE (North and Central America, Caribbean and South America) ====
29 members of the Pan American Baseball Confederation under it.

North and
Central America
- Canada♣
- Costa Rica
- El Salvador
- Guatemala
- Honduras
- Mexico♣
- Nicaragua♣
- Panama♣
- United States♣
Caribbean
- Aruba
- Bahamas
- British Virgin Islands
- Cuba♣
- Curaçao
- Dominican Republic♣
- Haiti
- Jamaica
- Puerto Rico♣
- Trinidad and Tobago
- U.S. Virgin Islands
South America
- Argentina
- Bolivia
- Brazil♣
- Chile
- Colombia♣
- Ecuador
- Guyana
- Peru
- Venezuela♣🏆

== Women's ==
=== BFA (Asia) ===
At least 8 members of the Baseball Federation of Asia under it.

- China
- Chinese Taipei
- Hong Kong
- India
- Japan
- Pakistan
- Philippines
- South Korea

=== BCO (Oceania) ===
At least a member of the Baseball Confederation of Oceania under it.

- Australia

=== CEB (Europe) ===
At least 4 members of the Confederation of European Baseball under it.

- Czech Republic
- France
- Great Britain
- Netherlands

=== COPABE (North and Central America, Caribbean and South America) ===
At least six members of the Pan American Baseball Confederation under it.

North and
Central America
- Canada
- United States
Caribbean
- Cuba
- Dominican Republic
- Puerto Rico
South America
- Venezuela

== See also ==
- Baseball awards § Individual countries
