= Baseball at the 2008 Summer Olympics – Qualification =

Eight teams qualified for the Olympic baseball tournament. The host nation qualifies automatically. Additionally, two teams qualified from the American qualifying tournament, and one team qualified from both the European and Asian qualifying tournaments. The field was rounded out by the top three teams from the world Olympic qualifying tournament. The qualifications were held in Taichung, Barcelona, and Havana.

== Table ==
Event	Date	Location	Vacancies	Qualified
Host Nation			1	China
Americas Qualifying Tournament	Aug 25 – Sep 7, 2006	(Cuba) Havana	2	United States; Cuba
European Championship	September 7–16, 2007	(Spain) Barcelona	1	Netherlands
Asian Baseball Championship	Nov 27 – Dec 3, 2007	(Taiwan) Taichung (Note: Chinese Taipei is the official IOC designation for the state officially referred to as the Republic of China (ROC), commonly known as Taiwan. (See also Political status of Taiwan for details.))	1	Japan
Final Qualifying Tournament	March 7–14, 2008	(Taiwan) Taichung and Douliou	3	Canada; South Korea; Chinese Taipei
TOTAL			8	

== American qualifying tournament ==
=== Qualifying round ===
North and Central America

Team	Pld	W	L	PCT	RS	RA	RD
United States	5	5	0	1.000	49	13	+36
Canada	5	3	2	0.600	34	17	+17
Nicaragua	5	3	2	0.600	20	14	+6
Panama	5	2	3	0.400	38	35	+3
Mexico (Note: The third-place Caribbean team was scheduled to advance to the preliminary round. However, Aruba withdrew and the IBAF replaced it with the fifth-place North American team, Mexico.)	5	2	3	0.400	24	28	-4
Guatemala	5	0	5	0.000	4	58	-54

==== Schedule ====
Home	Result	Away
November 15, 2005
Nicaragua	1–3	Canada
United States	23–0 (6 Innings)	Guatemala
Panama	17–4 (7 Innings)	Mexico
November 16, 2005
Canada	12–0 (7 Innings)	Guatemala
Nicaragua	6–1	Panama
United States	5–4	Mexico
November 17, 2005
Canada	15–5	Panama
United States	7–4	Nicaragua
Mexico	5–2	Guatemala
November 18, 2005
Mexico	7–2	Canada
Nicaragua	6–1	Guatemala
United States	9–3	Panama
November 19, 2005
United States	5–2	Canada
Nicaragua	4–2	Mexico
Guatemala	1–12	Panama

Caribbean

Team	Pld	W	L	PCT	RS	RA	RD
Dominican Republic	3	3	0	1.000	32	0	+32
Puerto Rico	3	2	1	0.667	32	5	+27
Aruba	3	1	2	0.333	11	17	-6
Bahamas	3	0	3	0.000	0	53	-53
Jamaica	Withdrew						
U.S. Virgin Islands	Withdrew						
Curaçao	Withdrew						

South America

Team	Pld	W	L	PCT	RS	RA	RD
Venezuela	4	4	0	1.000	24	12	+12
Brazil	4	3	1	0.750	26	8	+18
Ecuador	4	2	2	0.500	14	15	-1
Colombia	4	1	3	0.250	14	19	-5
Argentina	4	0	4	0.000	12	36	-24

=== Preliminary round ===
Group A

Team	Pld	W	L	PCT	RS	RA	RD
Cuba	5	5	0	1.000	64	10	+54
Panama	5	4	1	0.800	38	17	+21
Nicaragua	5	3	2	0.600	24	18	+6
Dominican Republic	5	2	3	0.400	31	31	0
Colombia	5	1	4	0.200	15	41	-26
Ecuador	5	0	5	0.000	11	63	-52

Group B

Team	Pld	W	L	PCT	RS	RA	RD
United States	5	4	1	0.800	46	27	+19
Mexico	5	4	1	0.800	23	19	+4
Canada	5	3	2	0.600	24	18	+6
Venezuela	5	2	3	0.400	27	39	-12
Brazil	5	1	4	0.200	27	32	-5
Puerto Rico	5	1	4	0.200	23	34	-11

==== Schedule ====
Home		Away
August 25, 2006
Cuba		Colombia
August 26, 2006
United States	9–3	Canada
Cuba	11–0	Ecuador
Mexico	2–1	Brazil
Panama	3–2	Dominican Republic
August 27, 2006
Canada	6–5	Puerto Rico
United States	8–7	Brazil
Cuba	7–6	Panama
Mexico	5–4	Venezuela
Nicaragua	4–0	Colombia
Dominican Republic	13–1	Ecuador
August 28, 2006
Mexico	3–15	United States
Venezuela	5–7	Canada
Puerto Rico	10–6	Brazil
Cuba	17–3	Dominican Republic
August 29, 2006
Puerto Rico	2–5	United States
Canada	1–2	Mexico
Dominican Republic	8–3	Colombia
Cuba	11–0	Nicaragua
August 30, 2006
United States	9–12	Venezuela
Canada	7–3	Brazil
Cuba	15–1	Ecuador
Nicaragua	6–4	Dominican Republic
Mexico	8-7	Puerto Rico

=== Final round ===
Team has qualified directly
Team has advanced to the Final Qualifying Tournament

Team	Pld	W	L	PCT	RS	RA	RD
United States	7	6	1	0.857	69	32	+37
Cuba	7	6	1	0.857	63	18	+45
Mexico	7	5	2	0.714	38	24	+14
Canada	7	4	3	0.571	43	38	+5
Venezuela	7	3	4	0.428	41	41	0
Panama	7	2	5	0.286	39	51	-12
Nicaragua	7	2	5	0.286	16	33	-17
Dominican Republic	7	0	7	0.000	21	61	-40

== Oceania qualifying tournament ==
With New Zealand withdrawing from the tournament, Australia received an automatic berth into the World Qualifying Tournament.

Team has advanced to the Final Qualifying Tournament

Team	W	L	RA/9	Tiebreaker
Australia	0	0	0	0
New Zealand	Withdrew			

=== Schedule ===
Home		Away	Time
February 8, 2007
Australia	Cancelled	New Zealand	19:00
February 9, 2007
New Zealand	Cancelled	Australia	19:00
February 10, 2007
Australia	Cancelled	New Zealand	15:00
Australia	Cancelled	New Zealand	19:00
February 11, 2007
Australia	Cancelled	New Zealand	14:00

== European qualifying tournament ==
=== Qualifying round 1 ===
Group A

Team	Pld	W	L	PCT	RS	RA	RD
Russia	3	3	0	1.000	35	3	+32
Austria	3	2	1	0.667	22	18	+4
Poland	3	1	2	0.333	24	23	+1
Georgia	3	0	3	0.000	8	45	-37

Group B

Team	Pld	W	L	PCT	RS	RA	RD
Belarus	3	3	0	1.000	33	10	+23
Lithuania	3	2	1	0.667	29	17	+12
Finland	3	1	2	0.333	28	43	-15
Turkey	3	0	3	0.000	22	42	-20

Group C

Team	Pld	W	L	PCT	RS	RA	RD
Croatia	3	3	0	1.000	30	6	+24
Ireland	3	2	1	0.667	14	5	+9
Slovakia	3	1	2	0.333	15	16	-1
Norway	3	0	3	0.000	8	40	-32

Group D

Team	Pld	W	L	PCT	RS	RA	RD
Belgium	3	3	0	1.000	25	2	+23
Switzerland	3	2	1	0.667	18	11	+7
Slovenia	3	1	2	0.333	17	17	0
San Marino	3	0	3	0.000	3	33	-30

=== Qualifying round 2 ===
Semi-finals
Russia	11
Lithuania	1
Belarus	5
Austria	15

Final
Russia	17
Austria	0

Semi-finals
Croatia	13
Switzerland	3
Belgium	1
Ireland	4

Final
Croatia	12
Ireland	2

=== European Baseball Championship ===
The European Baseball Championship in Barcelona, Spain served as the qualifying competition for the 2008 Summer Olympics. The Netherlands won the tournament for the fifth consecutive time and qualified for the 2008 Summer Olympics in Beijing. Great Britain and Spain advanced to a final qualifying tournament in Taiwan. Prior to the tournament, Greece was removed by the European Baseball Confederation and replaced with Austria. Czech Republic was downgraded to the last place at the end of the tournament and its wins in the preliminary round vacated.

==== Preliminary round ====
Group A

Team	Pld	W	L	PCT	RS	RA	RD
Netherlands	5	5	0	1.000	66	5	+61
Germany	5	4	1	0.800	36	15	+21
Sweden	5	3	2	0.600	20	27	-7
Croatia	5	2	3	0.400	26	38	-12
Austria	5	1	4	0.200	13	44	-31
Czech Republic	5	0	5	0.000	2	37	-35

- September 8

Sweden 1 – 9 Germany
Czech Republic 0 – 9* Croatia
Austria 0 – 22 (5 inn.) Netherlands

- September 9

Croatia 2 – 11 Sweden
Germany 10 – 0 (7 inn.) Austria
Netherlands 11 – 0 (7 inn.) Czech Republic

- September 10

Netherlands 14 – 2 (7 inn.) Sweden
Czech Republic 0 – 9* Austria
Germany 8 – 7 Croatia

- September 11

Netherlands 6 – 3 Germany
Austria 3 – 8 Croatia
Czech Republic 1 – 2 Sweden

- September 12

Germany 6 – 1 Czech Republic
Croatia 0 – 13 (7 inn.) Netherlands
Sweden 4 – 1 Austria

* The Czech Republic's 4–1 and 6–2 victories over Croatia and Austria were vacated and the results recorded as 9–0 forfeits.

Group B

Team	Pld	W	L	PCT	RS	RA	RD
Great Britain	5	4	1	0.800	35	24	+11
Spain	5	4	1	0.800	29	22	+7
France	5	3	2	0.600	20	15	+5
Italy	5	3	2	0.600	31	13	+18
Ukraine	5	1	4	0.200	10	36	-26
Russia	5	0	5	0.000	14	29	-15

- September 7

Great Britain 12 – 8 Spain

- September 8

Ukraine 0 – 13 (8 inn.) Italy
France 4 – 2 Russia

- September 9

Spain 5 – 4 Ukraine
Italy 1 – 5 France
Russia 7 – 10 Great Britain

- September 10

France 6 – 2 Ukraine
Spain 4 – 0 Russia
Italy 6 – 0 Great Britain

- September 11

France 3 – 4 Great Britain
Ukraine 4 – 3 (11 inn.) Russia
Italy 4 – 6 Spain

- September 12

Russia 2 – 7 Italy
Great Britain 9 – 0 Ukraine
Spain 6 – 2 France

==== Final round ====
Team has qualified directly
Team has advanced to the Final Qualifying Tournament

Team	Pld	W	L	PCT	RS	RA	RD	Tiebreaker*
Netherlands	5	5	0	1.000	54	14	+40	
Great Britain	5	4	1	0.800	35	24	+11	1–1, 0.833 RA/IN
Spain	5	3	2	0.600	41	32	+9	1–1, 0.833 RA/IN
Germany	5	3	2	0.600	29	24	+5	1–1, 0.889 RA/IN
France	5	1	4	0.200	16	35	-19	
Sweden	5	0	5	0.000	15	51	-36	

* Tiebreakers: 1) W–L in games among tied teams 2) Runs against per 1 defensive inning among tied teams 3) Earned Runs against per 1 defensive inning among tied teams

- September 14

Netherlands 18 – 0 (7 inn.)France
Germany 3 – 11 Spain
Sweden 7 – 10 Great Britain

- September 15

France 10 – 0 (7 inn.) Sweden
Spain 8 – 10 (11 inn.) Netherlands
Great Britain 5 – 7 Germany

- September 16

Germany 7 – 1 France
Sweden 5 – 8 Spain
Netherlands 6 – 1 Great Britain

==== Classification ====
- September 13

Seventh Place Game

Czech Republic 2 – 7 Italy

Ninth Place Game

Croatia 2 – 1 Ukraine

Eleventh Place Game

Austria 2 – 7 Russia

== 2007 Asian Championship ==
The IBAF and IOC recognize Taiwan as Chinese Taipei. Internationally, the team plays as the Chinese Taipei National baseball team, however are referred to, in the country, as the Taiwan National baseball team and use the flag.

=== B Level ===
Team	W	D	L	Tiebreaker
Philippines	2	1	0	
Thailand	1	1	1	
Hong Kong	1	0	2	1–0
Pakistan	1	0	2	0–1

==== Schedule ====
Home	Result	Away	Time
November 27, 2007
Pakistan	0–2	Philippines	17:00
Hong Kong	4–8	Thailand	18:00
November 28, 2007
Thailand	3–5	Pakistan	13:00
Philippines	4–1	Hong Kong	18:00
November 29, 2007
Philippines	0–0 (F/12)	Thailand	13:00
Pakistan	6–8	Hong Kong	18:00

=== A Level ===
Team has qualified directly
Team has advanced to the Final Qualifying Tournament

Team	W	L
Japan	3	0
South Korea	2	1
Chinese Taipei	1	2
Philippines	0	3

==== Schedule ====
Home	Result	Away	Time
December 1, 2007
Chinese Taipei	2–5	South Korea	13:00
Japan	10–0 (F/7)	Philippines	18:00
December 2, 2007
Philippines	0–9	Chinese Taipei	13:00
South Korea	3–4	Japan	18:00
December 3, 2007
South Korea	13–1 (F/7)	Philippines	13:00
Chinese Taipei	2–10	Japan	18:00

== African qualifying tournament ==
Team has advanced to the Final Qualifying Tournament

Team	W	L
South Africa	5	0
Nigeria	3	1
Ghana	3	2
Zimbabwe	2	3
Lesotho	1	3
Cameroon	0	5

=== Schedule ===
Home	Result	Away	Time
December 15
Ghana	22–0	Cameroon	9:00
Nigeria	17–3	Zimbabwe	9:00
Cameroon	1–18	Lesotho	12:20
Zimbabwe	0–20	South Africa	12:20
Lesotho	0–29	South Africa	15:30
Nigeria	22–0	Ghana	15:30
December 16
Cameroon	Rained out	Zimbabwe	9:00
Nigeria	Rained out	Lesotho	9:00
Cameroon	1–16 (5 Innings)	South Africa	12:20
Ghana	3–1 (6 Innings)	Zimbabwe	12:20
Nigeria	Rained out	South Africa	15:30
Ghana	Rained out	Lesotho	15:30
December 17
Nigeria	2–12 (8 Innings)	South Africa	9:00
Ghana	11–5	Lesotho	9:00
Zimbabwe	19–11 (7 Innings)	Cameroon	9:00
South Africa	15–0 (7 Innings)	Ghana	12:00
Cameroon	5–22 (6 Innings)	Nigeria	12:00
Zimbabwe	7–4	Lesotho	12:00
Lesotho	Cancelled	Nigeria	15:00

Note: The final game between Lesotho and Nigeria was dependent on whether it had any impact upon the final standings. As South Africa had clinched the championship before the game was to begin, it was cancelled.

== Final qualifying tournament ==
The final qualifying tournament will feature the third and fourth place teams from the Americas qualifying tournament, the second and third place teams from the Asian and European qualifying tournaments, and the Oceanian and African continental champions. However, European runner-up Great Britain withdrew from the tournament and were replaced by the fourth place team Germany.

Qualified Teams

- Mexico (Americas 3rd)
- Canada (Americas 4th)
- Spain (Europe 3rd)
- Germany (Europe 4th; Replace Europe 2nd Great Britain that withdrew from the tournament)
- South Korea (Asia 2nd)
- Chinese Taipei (Asia 3rd)
- Australia (Oceania 1st)
- South Africa (Africa 1st)

=== Standings ===
Team has qualified

Team	W	L	Tiebreaker
Canada	6	1	1–0
South Korea	6	1	0–1
Chinese Taipei	5	2	-
Mexico	4	3	1–0
Australia	4	3	0–1
Germany	2	5	-
Spain	1	6	-
South Africa	0	7	-

=== Schedule ===
Home	Result	Away	Time
March 7
South Africa	0–5	South Korea	12:30
Mexico	10–15	Canada	12:30
Chinese Taipei	13–3 (F/7)	Spain	19:00
Germany	1–4	Australia	18:30
March 8
Canada	10–0 (F/7)	South Africa	12:30
Mexico	1–6	Chinese Taipei	12:30
South Korea	16–2 (F/7)	Australia	18:30
Spain	0–1	Germany	18:30
March 9
Germany	0–2	Chinese Taipei	12:30
Australia	10–5	Canada	12:30
South Africa	1–2	Spain	18:30
South Korea	6–1	Mexico	18:30
March 10
Germany	4–3	South Africa	12:30
Spain	5–14	South Korea	12:30
Chinese Taipei	5–6 (F/10)	Canada	18:30
Australia	4–7	Mexico	18:30
March 12
South Korea	12–1 (F/7)	Germany	12:30
Canada	11–0 (F/7)	Spain	12:30
Mexico	5–0	South Africa	18:30
Chinese Taipei	5–0	Australia	18:30
March 13
Australia	9–0	Spain	12:30
Germany	0–4	Mexico	12:30
Canada	4–3	South Korea	18:30
South Africa	0–4	Chinese Taipei	18:30
March 14
Spain	1–2	Mexico	12:30
South Africa	11–13	Australia	12:30
Chinese Taipei	3–4	South Korea	18:30
Canada	2–1 (F/10)	Germany	16:30

== See also ==
- List of sporting events in Taiwan
