= Africa Cup Baseball Championship =

The Africa Cup Baseball Championship is the main international baseball competition in Africa. The Africa Cup Baseball Championship has not been played with the frequency, regularity, or history of the European Championship, Asian Championship or South American Championship. Instead, it has been more irregular, like the Oceania Championship. Continental tournaments were also held at the All-Africa Games in 1999 and 2003.

== Results ==
Year	Host	Medalists		
Year	Host	Gold	Silver	Bronze
1992	(Zimbabwe); Harare	South Africa	Zimbabwe	Nigeria
1993	(South Africa); Cape Town			
1995	(Zimbabwe); Harare			
2001	(Uganda); Kampala	South Africa	Nigeria	Uganda
2019 details	(South Africa); Johannesburg	South Africa	Uganda	Zimbabwe

== Medal table ==
Rank	Nation	Gold	Silver	Bronze	Total
1	South Africa	3	0	0	3
2	Nigeria	0	1	1	2
2	Uganda	0	1	1	2
2	Zimbabwe	0	1	1	2
Totals (4 entries)		3	3	3	9
