= National team appearances in the World Baseball Classic =

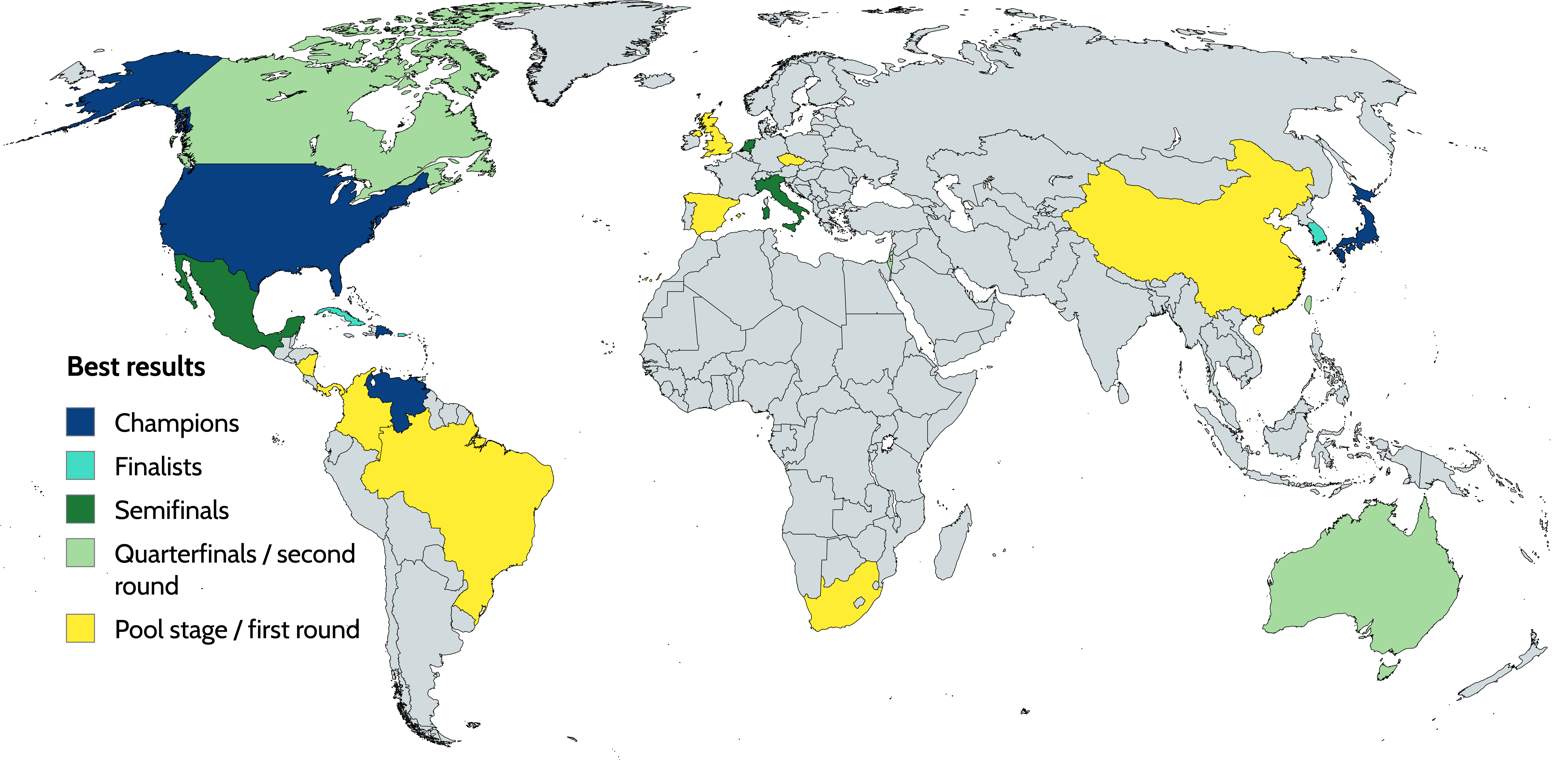
The countries which have participated in the WBC and their highest standing in the tournament.

This article lists the performances of each of the 23 national teams which have made at least one appearance in the World Baseball Classic (WBC). The 2006 and 2009 tournaments each had the same 16-team field, chosen by invitation. Beginning with the 2013 tournament, the four last-place teams from the previous tournament's first round each must participate in a qualifying round for the following tournament. The outcome of this process has been that 13 of the original 16 teams have continued to appear in every tournament. In 2013, Canada and Chinese Taipei re-qualified, while Panama and South Africa were respectively replaced by Brazil and Spain. In 2017, Australia and Mexico re-qualified while Brazil and Spain were respectively replaced by Colombia and Israel. In 2023, the tournament expanded to 20 teams, so the 16 teams from the previous tournament returned, with 4 additional teams entering through the qualifying round. Czechia, Great Britain, and Nicaragua made their first appearance in the World Baseball Classic that year, while Panama returned after having missed out on the previous two tournaments. In 2026, China failed to qualify for the first time, with Brazil returning to the tournament in their place.

Other teams to have reached the championship game are Cuba (2006), South Korea (2009), and Puerto Rico (2013, 2017). Other teams to have reached the semifinals are the Netherlands (2013, 2017), Mexico (2023), and Italy (2026). Other teams to have reached the quarterfinals (previously the second round) are Chinese Taipei (2013), Israel (2017), Australia (2023), and Canada (2026). Venezuela is the current champion, defeating the United States at the 2026 WBC Final.

== Performance of confederations ==
The World Baseball Softball Confederation (WBSC) currently divides all countries into five confederations based on their region: Africa, Americas, Asia, Europe, and Oceania. Currently, the two best confederations in international baseball are Americas and Asia, as both confederations add up to 18 of the 20 top four finishes (three titles for Asia and two titles for the Americas). While the appearances of the Americas region expands throughout, all appearances for Asia in the World Baseball Classic were by countries in East Asia in particular. Europe holds the other 2 of the 16 top four finishes, both coming from the Netherlands with the help of the Dutch Caribbean. Italy's and Israel's top eight appearances in 2013 and 2017 respectively have led the region's growth in baseball in addition to the Netherlands' two top four finishes. As for Africa and Oceania, both regions lack a baseball scene in general, although South Africa and Australia are indisputably the best two countries in baseball in their respective regions due to their strong leagues. In addition, both countries make up all of the World Baseball Classic appearances for their respective regions, including a quarterfinals finish by Australia in 2023.

As decorated as the Americas region is, only six countries in the region have ever made the top four: Cuba, Dominican Republic, Mexico, Puerto Rico, United States, and Venezuela. The Dominican Republic, United States, and Venezuela are the only countries to earn first place, in 2013, 2017, and 2026, respectively. In addition to the aforementioned champions, Cuba and Puerto Rico are the only other countries to have made the top four more than once. As for Asia, the countries in East Asia dominate the baseball scene in that region, as Japan and South Korea are the only two countries in that region to appear more than once in the top four. On top of that, Japan is the only country in the world to appear in the top four in all iterations of the World Baseball Classic outside of 2026, with three first-place finishes earned. As such, all bids so far have been granted to those two regions.

Total times teams qualified by confederation
Confederation	Africa	Americas	Asia	Europe	Oceania	Total
Teams	2	53	23	20	6	104
Top 8	0	30	10	7	1	48
Top 4	0	14	7	3	0	24
Top 2	0	8	4	0	0	12
1st	0	3	3	0	0	6
2nd	0	5	1	0	0	6
3rd	0	3	3	0	0	6
4th	0	3	0	3	0	6

== Teams reaching the top four ==
After the conclusion of each WBC championship game, players from the losing team receive silver medals, followed by the winners receiving gold medals. The third-place team receives bronze medals at a separate date. The WBC does not hold a third-place playoff, so the ranking of the third- and fourth-placed teams is determined by the WBSC.

Teams reaching the top four
Team	Champions	Runners-up	Third place	Fourth place	Total
Japan	3 (2006, 2009, 2023)	–	2 (2013, 2017)		5
United States	1 (2017)	2 (2023, 2026)	–	1 (2009)	4
Dominican Republic	1 (2013)	–	1 (2026)	1 (2006)	3
Venezuela	1 (2026)	–	1 (2009)	–	2
Puerto Rico	–	2 (2013, 2017)	–	–	2
South Korea	–	1 (2009)	1 (2006)	–	2
Cuba	–	1 (2006)	–	1 (2023)	2
Mexico	–	–	1 (2023)	–	1
Netherlands	–	–		2 (2013, 2017)	2
Italy	–	–	–	1 (2026)	1

== Debut of national teams ==
The 2009 tournament did not feature any debuting teams, as the 16 teams from the 2006 tournament were all invited to return. The 2026 tournament was the first tournament since 2009 in which every participating team had played in at least one previous Word Baseball Classic tournament. A total of 23 teams have participated in the World Baseball Classic as of the 2026 tournament.

Year	Debutants	Total	CT
2006	Australia, Canada, China, Chinese Taipei, Cuba, Dominican Republic, Italy, Japan, Mexico, Netherlands, Panama, Puerto Rico, South Korea, South Africa, United States, Venezuela	16	16
2009	None	0	16
2013	Brazil, Spain	2	18
2017	Colombia, Israel	2	20
2023	Great Britain, Czech Republic, Nicaragua	3	23
2026	None	0	23

== Number of appearances ==
Team	Apps	Record streak	Active streak	Debut	Most recent	Best result
Australia	6	6	6	2006	2026	Quarterfinals (2023)
Canada	6	6	6	2006	2026	Quarterfinals (2026)
Chinese Taipei	6	6	6	2006	2026	Second round (2013)
Cuba	6	6	6	2006	2026	Runners-up (2006)
Dominican Republic	6	6	6	2006	2026	Champions (2013)
Italy	6	6	6	2006	2026	Semifinals (2026)
Japan	6	6	6	2006	2026	Champions (2006, 2009, 2023)
Mexico	6	6	6	2006	2026	Semifinals (2023)
Netherlands	6	6	6	2006	2026	Semifinals (2013, 2017)
Puerto Rico	6	6	6	2006	2026	Runners-up (2013, 2017)
South Korea	6	6	6	2006	2026	Runners-up (2009)
United States	6	6	6	2006	2026	Champions (2017)
Venezuela	6	6	6	2006	2026	Champions (2026)
China	5	5	0	2006	2023	Pool stage
Panama	4	2	2	2006	2026	Pool stage
Colombia	3	3	3	2017	2026	First round/pool stage
Israel	3	3	3	2017	2026	Second round (2017)
Brazil	2	1	1	2013	2026	First round/pool stage
Czech Republic	2	2	2	2023	2026	Pool stage
Great Britain	2	2	2	2023	2026	Pool stage
Nicaragua	2	2	2	2023	2026	Pool stage
South Africa	2	2	0	2006	2009	First round
Spain	1	1	0	2013	2013	First round

== Comprehensive team results by tournament ==
Legend

- 1st – Champions
- 2nd – Runners-up
- 3rd – Third place
- 4th – Fourth place
- QF – Quarterfinals (2023–present)
- R2 – Round 2 (2006–2017: second round)
- R1 – Round 1 (2006–2017: first round, 2023–present: pool stage)
- – Relegated to qualification tournament
- Q – Qualified
- • – Did not qualify
- × – Did not enter

A total of 23 nations have competed in the WBC proper, with 13 appearing in all six editions. Japan has been the most successful, as the only nation with multiple WBC titles (2006, 2009, 2023), the nation with the most wins in WBC play (34), and the most appearances (5) in the semifinal stage. Japan also owns the best overall winning percentage in WBC games at .791 (34–9 record), bolstered by its 7–0 mark en route to the 2023 title.

Along with Japan, two other nations have advanced to at least the second round in all six WBCs: the United States and Puerto Rico. The US posted a 10–10 overall record through the first three WBCs, with only one appearance in the semifinals. The Americans broke through in 2017, going 6–2 on their way to their first WBC title, then returned to the finals in 2023 and 2026. Puerto Rico made consecutive appearances in the WBC finals in 2013 and 2017, albeit losing both, and stood tied with the US for the second-most all-time WBC wins (26) following the 2026 tournament.

Each of the 13 teams to appear in all six tournaments have advanced past the first round at least once. Australia advanced to the second round for the first time in 2023, and Canada advanced to the second round for the first time in 2026. Israel are the only other team to reach the second round of the tournament, doing so in its debut in 2017.

Team	2006 (16)	2009 (16)	2013 (16)	2017 (16)	2023 (20)	2026 (20)	Total
Argentina	×	×	×	×	•	×	0
Australia	R1; 13th	R1; 12th	R1; 16th	R1; 9th	QF; 7th	R1; 9th	6
Brazil	×	×	R1; 14th	•	•	R1; 20th	2
Canada	R1; 9th	R1; 13th	R1; 12th	R1; 15th	R1; 12th	QF; 6th	6
China	R1; 15th	R1; 11th	R1; 13th	R1; 16th	R1; 20th	•	5
Chinese Taipei	R1; 12th	R1; 14th	R2; 8th	R1; 14th	R1; 17th	R1; 13th	6
Colombia	×	×	•	R1; 11th	R1; 18th	R1; 14th	3
Cuba	2nd	R2; 6th	R2; 5th	R2; 7th	4th	R1; 10th	6
Czechia	×	×	•	•	R1; 14th	R1; 19th	2
Dominican Republic	4th	R1; 9th	1st	R2; 5th	R1; 10th	3rd	6
France	×	×	•	•	•	×	0
Germany	×	×	•	•	•	•	0
Great Britain	×	×	•	•	R1; 15th	R1; 15th	2
Israel	×	×	•	R2; 6th	R1; 16th	R1; 12th	3
Italy	R1; 10th	R1; 10th	R2; 7th	R1; 12th	QF; 8th	4th	6
Japan	1st	1st	3rd	3rd	1st	QF; 5th	6
Mexico	R2; 6th	R2; 8th	R1; 11th	R1; 13th	3rd	R1; 11th	6
Netherlands	R1; 11th	R2; 7th	4th	4th	R1; 11th	R1; 16th	6
New Zealand	×	×	•	•	•	×	0
Nicaragua	×	×	•	•	R1; 19th	R1; 18th	2
Pakistan	×	×	×	•	•	×	0
Panama	R1; 14th	R1; 15th	•	•	R1; 13th	R1; 17th	4
Philippines	×	×	•	•	×	×	0
Puerto Rico	R2; 5th	R2; 5th	2nd	2nd	QF; 6th	QF; 7th	6
South Africa	R1; 16th	R1; 16th	•	•	•	•	2
South Korea	3rd	2nd	R1; 9th	R1; 10th	R1; 9th	QF; 8th	6
Spain	×	×	R1; 15th	•	•	•	1
Thailand	×	×	•	×	×	×	0
United States	R2; 8th	4th	R2; 6th	1st	2nd	2nd	6
Venezuela	R2; 7th	3rd	R1; 10th	R2; 8th	QF; 5th	1st	6
Team	2006 (16)	2009 (16)	2013 (16)	2017 (16)	2023 (20)	2026 (20)	Total

== Overall team records ==
Updated after 2026 World Baseball Classic. Teams in bold were part of the 2026 World Baseball Classic.

Team	Part	Pld	W	L	PCT
**Japan**	6	43	34	9	.791
**Dominican Republic**	6	34	25	9	.735
**Puerto Rico**	6	39	26	13	.667
**United States**	6	42	26	16	.619
**South Korea**	6	31	19	12	.613
**Venezuela**	6	36	22	14	.611
**Cuba**	6	36	20	16	.556
**Israel**	3	14	7	7	.500
**Mexico**	6	28	13	15	.464
**Italy**	6	26	12	14	.462
**Netherlands**	6	32	14	18	.438
**Canada**	6	20	8	12	.400
**Australia**	6	21	7	14	.333
**Chinese Taipei**	6	21	7	14	.333
**Colombia**	3	11	3	8	.273
**Great Britain**	2	8	2	6	.250
**Panama**	4	13	3	10	.231
China	5	16	2	14	.125
**Czech Republic**	2	8	1	7	.125
Spain	1	3	0	3	.000
South Africa	2	5	0	5	.000
**Brazil**	2	7	0	7	.000
**Nicaragua**	2	8	0	8	.000

== Medal table ==
Rank	Nation	Gold	Silver	Bronze	Total
1	Japan	3	0	2	5
2	United States	1	2	0	3
3	Dominican Republic	1	0	1	2
3	Venezuela	1	0	1	2
5	Puerto Rico	0	2	0	2
6	South Korea	0	1	1	2
7	Cuba	0	1	0	1
8	Mexico	0	0	1	1
Totals (8 entries)		**6**	**6**	**6**	**18**

== Performance of host nations ==
Since the WBC's format allows multiple nations to host different rounds of the event, seven different nations have hosted at least one round through the first six iterations of the tournament. Records of each nation when playing on its home soil are listed below.

Team	Pld	W	L	PCT
Japan	27	24	3	.888
Puerto Rico	16	12	4	.750
United States	39	24	15	.615
Chinese Taipei	7	4	3	.571
Mexico	7	3	4	.429
South Korea	3	1	2	.333
Canada	2	0	2	.000

The following table lists the teams who've earned the most wins against host countries.

Rk	Team	Wins
1	Cuba	4
	Puerto Rico	4
	South Korea	4
4	Dominican Republic	3
	Italy	3
	Mexico	3
	Venezuela	3
8	Canada	2
	Japan	2
10	5 others	1

== Performance of defending finalists ==
Japan is the only nation to successfully defend the World Baseball Classic as defending champions in 2009. Puerto Rico achieved runners-up in the World Baseball Classic as defending runners-up in 2017. The worst performance of defending champions were by the Dominican Republic in 2017 and Japan in 2026, both eliminating in the second round (now the quarterfinals).

Year	Defending champions	Finish	Defending runners-up	Finish
2009	Japan	**Champions**	Cuba	Second round
2013	Japan	**Third place**	South Korea	First round
2017	Dominican Republic	Second round	Puerto Rico	**Runners-up**
2023	United States	**Runners-up**	Puerto Rico	Quarterfinals
2026	Japan	Quarterfinals	United States	**Runners-up**

== Performance by confederation ==
This is a summary of the best performances of each confederation in each tournament.

Confederation	2006 (16)	2009 (16)	2013 (16)	2017 (16)	2023 (20)	2026 (20)
WBSC Africa	R1	R1	—	—	—	–
WBSC Americas	**2nd**	**3rd**	**1st**	**1st**	**2nd**	**1st**
WBSC Asia	**1st**	**1st**	**3rd**	**3rd**	**1st**	QF
WBSC Europe	R1	R2	**4th**	**4th**	QF	**4th**
WBSC Oceania	R1	R1	R1	R1	QF	R1

== Number of teams by confederation ==
This is a summary of the total number of participating teams by confederation in each tournament.

Confederation	2006 (16)	2009 (16)	2013 (16)	2017 (16)	2023 (20)	2026 (20)
WBSC Africa	1	1	0	0	0	0
WBSC Americas	8	8	8	8	10	11
WBSC Asia	4	4	4	4	4	3
WBSC Europe	2	2	3	3	5	5
WBSC Oceania	1	1	1	1	1	1
