= 2019 African Baseball Championship =

Tournament details
- Country: South Africa
- City: Johannesburg
- Dates: 1–5 May 2019
- Teams: 4 (originally 6) (from WBSC Africa confederations)

Final positions
- Champions: South Africa
- Runners-up: Uganda
- Third place: Zimbabwe
- Fourth place: Burkina Faso

Awards
- MVP: (South Africa) Kyle Botha
- Winning team qualified for Africa/Europe 2020 Olympic qualifiers

The 2019 African Baseball Championship was the fourth Africa Baseball Championship, after 1999, 2003, and 2007. The Championship was held from 1–5 May 2019 at the Boksburg Baseball Club in Johannesburg, South Africa. South Africa won the tournament.

Seventeen national baseball teams in Africa were originally divided into four zones for the 2020 Olympics qualifiers. Ultimately, three regional qualifiers were held leading up to the African championship, starting in March 2019 at the Labone Secondary School in Labone, a suburb of Accra, Ghana, as well as Kenya and South Africa in April.

Burkina Faso competed in Zone West 1 against Ghana, Nigeria, Tunisia, and Cote d’Ivoire. In April at the first African West One pre-qualifier for the 2020 Olympics, Burkina Faso defeated Nigeria (13-3) and Ghana (14-4). Burkina Faso was the first team to qualify, followed by Nigeria, Kenya, Uganda, South Africa, and Zimbabwe. Nigeria and Kenya withdrew before the championship began. Burkina Faso lost in the semifinal in May to South Africa, 16–1.

South African catcher Kyle Botha was named the most valuable player of the tournament.

South Africa won the championship and advanced to the 2019 Europe-Africa Qualifier for the 2020 Olympics in Italy in September 2019 to face the top five teams from the 2019 European Baseball Championship. South Africa lost all five games in that tournament.

== Final standings ==
Rank	Team	Pld	W	L
1st place, gold medalist(s)	South Africa	5	5	0
2nd place, silver medalist(s)	Uganda	5	3	2
3rd place, bronze medalist(s)	Zimbabwe	5	2	3
4	Burkina Faso	5	0	5
