= 2017 World Baseball Classic – Qualifier 1 =

Qualifier 1 of the Qualifying Round of the 2017 World Baseball Classic was held at Blacktown Baseball Stadium, Sydney, Australia from February 11 to 14, 2016.

Qualifier 1 was a modified double-elimination tournament. The winners of Games 1 and 2 matched up in Game 4, while the losers faced each other in Game 3, an elimination game. The winner of the elimination game (Game 3) then played the loser of the non-elimination game (Game 4), in Game 5, another elimination game. The remaining two teams then played each other in Game 6, to determine the winners of the Qualifier 1.

== Bracket ==
Preliminaries
–	South Africa	7
–	New Zealand	1
–	Philippines	1
–	Australia	11
Lower round 1
L1	New Zealand	17
L2	Philippines	7

Semifinals
W1	South Africa	1
W2	Australia	4
Lower final
W3	New Zealand	2
L4	South Africa	9

Qualifier
W4	Australia	12
W5	South Africa	5

== Results ==
- All times are Australian Eastern Daylight Time (UTC+11:00).

=== South Africa 7, New Zealand 1 ===
February 11 13:00 at Blacktown Baseball Stadium
Team	1	2	3	4	5	6	7	8	9	R	H	E
South Africa	0	0	3	0	0	0	0	0	4	7	9	0
New Zealand	0	0	0	0	0	0	0	0	1	1	3	3
WP: Dylan Unsworth (1−0) LP: Scott Cone (0−1); Attendance: 529 (17.6%); Umpires: HP − Brett Robson, 1B − Travis Eggert, 2B − Roberto Ortiz, 3B − Alex Ortiz; Boxscore

=== Australia 11, Philippines 1 ===
February 11 19:30 at Blacktown Baseball Stadium (F/7)
Team	1	2	3	4	5	6	7	8	9	R	H	E
Philippines	1	0	0	0	0	0	0	X	X	1	4	3
Australia	1	1	0	0	2	0	7	X	X	11	11	1
WP: Steven Kent (1−0) LP: J.R. Bunda (0−1) Sv: Peter Moylan (1); Attendance: 1,442 (48.1%); Umpires: HP − Kun-young Park, 1B − Alex Ortiz, 2B − Travis Eggert, 3B − Takanori Yamamoto; Notes: Completed early due to 10–run mercy rule after 7 innings. Two outs when last run scored. Boxscore

=== New Zealand 17, Philippines 7 ===
February 12 13:00 at Blacktown Baseball Stadium (F/8)
Team	1	2	3	4	5	6	7	8	9	R	H	E
Philippines	1	0	0	2	1	3	0	0	X	7	11	2
New Zealand	2	1	0	0	1	6	5	2	X	17	13	2
WP: Jimmy Boyce (1−0) LP: Taylor Garrison (0−1); Home runs: PHI: Brady Conlan (1); NZL: Boss Moanaroa (1); Attendance: 623 (20.8%); Umpires: HP − Ramon Ortiz, 1B − Kun-young Park, 2B − Travis Eggert, 3B − Brett Robson; Notes: Completed early due to 10–run mercy rule after 8 innings. One out when last run scored. Boxscore

=== Australia 4, South Africa 1 ===
February 12 19:30 at Blacktown Baseball Stadium
Team	1	2	3	4	5	6	7	8	9	R	H	E
South Africa	0	0	1	0	0	0	0	0	0	1	6	1
Australia	3	0	0	0	0	1	0	0	X	4	7	1
WP: Warwick Saupold (1−0) LP: Carl Michaels (0−1) Sv: Ryan Searle (1); Attendance: 2,237 (74.6%); Umpires: HP − Takanori Yamamoto, 1B − Travis Eggert, 2B − Kun-young Park, 3B − Alex Ortiz; Boxscore

=== South Africa 9, New Zealand 2 ===
February 13 18:30 at Blacktown Baseball Stadium
Team	1	2	3	4	5	6	7	8	9	R	H	E
South Africa	1	0	4	0	0	3	0	0	1	9	11	0
New Zealand	0	0	0	2	0	0	0	0	0	2	5	1
WP: Jared Elario (1−0) LP: John Lee (0−1); Attendance: 1,367 (45.6%); Umpires: HP − Alex Ortiz, 1B − Roberto Ortiz, 2B − Brett Robson, 3B − Takanori Yamamoto; Boxscore

=== Australia 12, South Africa 5 ===
February 14 14:00 at Blacktown Baseball Stadium
Team	1	2	3	4	5	6	7	8	9	R	H	E
South Africa	1	0	0	0	0	3	0	1	0	5	7	1
Australia	1	0	0	0	2	1	2	6	X	12	17	1
WP: Peter Moylan (1−0) LP: Callan Pearce (0−1) Sv: Ryan Searle (2); Home runs: RSA: Gift Ngoepe (1), Kyle Botha (1); AUS: Brad Harman (1), Allan de San Miguel (1); Attendance: 1,766 (58.9%); Umpires: HP − Travis Eggert, 1B − Kun-young Park, 2B − Takanori Yamamoto, 3B − Roberto Ortiz; Boxscore
