= Burkina Faso national baseball team =

Information
- Country: Burkina Faso
- Federation: Fédération Burkinabè de Baseball et de Softball
- Confederation: WBSC Africa

WBSC ranking
- Current: NR (26 March 2026)
- Highest: 50 (31 December 2022)

The Burkina Faso national baseball team, also known as The Upright Men, is a baseball team that represents Burkina Faso in international baseball competitions.

Baseball was introduced in Burkina Faso in 1993. Japanese volunteers with the Japan International Cooperation Agency have also taught the sport in Burkina Faso. In 2016, ten national team players went to Japan to train. The Japanese embassy paid $83,400 to build a baseball and softball field in Ouagadougou that opened in 2023.

National team player Lassina Sanfo was the first player from Burkina Faso to play in a professional baseball game, playing for the Kōchi Fighting Dogs in Japan's Shikoku Island League Plus beginning in 2015 and becoming the semi-professional team's captain.

For the 2020 Olympics qualifiers, Burkina Faso competed in the west Africa zone against Ghana, Nigeria, Tunisia, and Cote d’Ivoire in Accra in April 2019. At the tournament, Burkina Faso defeated Nigeria (13–3) and Ghana (14–4). Tunisia and Ivory Coast did not attend the tournament.

Burkina Faso then advanced to the African Baseball Championship in May, losing all five games and finishing fourth out of four teams. Burkina Faso lost to eventual champion South Africa in a semifinal game, 16–1, then lost to Zimbabwe in the third-place game in 11 innings.
