= WBSC Africa =

African sports governing body

- Formation: June 8, 1990; 35 years ago
- Type: International sport federation
- Purpose: Sport governing body
- Headquarters: Minna, Nigeria
- Members: 27
- Official language: English
- President: (Niger) Uche Odozor
- Parent organization: World Baseball Softball Confederation
- Budget: $27,000 (2023)
- Website: https://www.wbscafrica.org/

WBSC Africa, formerly known as the African Baseball and Softball Association (ABSA), is the governing body of baseball and softball within Africa. There are 27 members.

The confederation is responsible for operation of Baseball at the All-Africa Games and the Africa Cup Baseball Championship, last held in 2019.

South Africa is the only African country to compete in baseball at the Summer Olympics, in 2000, or World Baseball Classic, in 2006 and 2009.

The Tunisia Baseball5 team has reached the highest WBSC ranking of any African club, ranking second in the world in May 2024 after winning the Baseball5 African Championship.

== History ==
The Africa Baseball and Softball Association (ABSA) was formed on June 8, 1990, in Lagos, Nigeria. The founding countries, 9 in number, were Angola, Botswana, Ghana, Lesotho, Namibia, Nigeria, Sierra Leone, Zambia and Zimbabwe. The executive committee unanimously appointed at the inaugural meeting included Malcolm Burne (Zimbabwe) as president, Russell Bartlett (Namibia) as first vice president, Ray Pitcher (Zambia) as second vice president, Brigadier Ishola Williams (Nigeria) as secretary general, Lieutenant Colonel L Gwadabe (Nigeria) as assistant secretary general and Ndi Okereke-Onyiuke (Nigeria) as treasurer. The executive director of the International Baseball Association (IBA), David Osinski was present at the inaugural meeting. The meeting was declared open by the then Minister of Sports of Nigeria, Air Commodore Anthony Ikhazoboh.

The 1st ABSA Congress was organised in 1992 in Harare, Zimbabwe. Thereafter 6 congresses have been held, with the 2nd held in 1993 in Cape Town, South Africa, the 3rd in 1994 in Johannesburg, South Africa, the 4th in 1995 in Harare, Zimbabwe, the 5th in 1996 in Lagos, Nigeria at which a new executive committee was elected to replace the appointed one. This Executive Committee comprised Major General Ishola Williams (Nigeria) as president, Ray Pitcher (Zambia) as vice president baseball, Matthews Kutumela (South Africa) as vice president softball, Etienne N’Guessan (Côte d'Ivoire) as secretary general and Fridah Shiroya (Kenya) as treasurer.

Also in 1996, responsibility for the promotion and development of the games was devolved to zones, and zonal coordinators were appointed as follows: zonal chairman North Africa Zone – Mohammed Ben Guiza (Tunisia), zonal chairman East and Central Africa Zone – Solomon Gacece (Kenya), zonal coordinator West Africa Zone – Ndi Okereke-Onyiuke (Nigeria), and zonal chairman Southern Africa Zone – Edwin Bennett.

The Sixth Congress was held in 2001 in Minna, Nigeria. Françoise Kameni Lele (Cameroon) was elected treasurer and the 7th Congress in 2006 in Nairobi, Kenya. At the Seventh Congress, Major General Ishola Williams was confirmed as president, Fridah Shiroya was elected vice president softball, and Mabothobile Shebe (Lesotho) was elected secretary general.

The first Africa Cup Baseball Championship was organised in 1992 in Harare, Zimbabwe with four countries participating, with South Africa winning, Zimbabwe finishing second, Nigeria third, and Zambia fourth. The second Africa Cup Baseball Championship in 1993 in Cape Town, South Africa, the third Africa Cup Baseball Championship in 1995 in Harare, and the fourth Africa Cup Championship in 2001 in Kampala, Uganda.

The first time baseball featured in the All-Africa Games was in 1999 in the seventh All-Africa Games in South Africa, and the second time was in 2003 at the eighth All-Africa Games in Nigeria. South Africa won both tournaments.

The first age-group baseball tournament organised by the ABSA was the 1st ABSA/KENKO Under-13 Baseball Tournament, with teams from four countries participating: winners South Africa as well as Kenya, Lesotho, and Zimbabwe.

The ABSA also organized AA Under-15, AAA Under-17, club championships and Little League competitions.

== Members ==
=== Baseball ===
Code	Association	National teams	Founded	Membership	IOC member	Note
BEN	Benin	(M, W)	2018	Full	Yes	
BUR	Burkina Faso	(M, W)	2004	Full	Yes	
CMR	Cameroon	(M, W)	1997	Full	Yes	
CPV	Cape Verde	(M, W)	2020	Full	Yes	
CHA	Chad	(M, W)	2005			
COD	(Democratic Republic of the Congo) Congo	(M, W)	2010	Full	Yes	
EGY	Egypt	(M, W)	2018	Full	Yes	
GHA	Ghana	(M, W)	1992	Full	Yes	
CIV	Ivory Coast	(M, W)	1996	Full	Yes	
KEN	Kenya	(M, W)	1997	Full	Yes	
LES	Lesotho	(M, W)	1994	Full	Yes	
NIG	Niger	(M, W)	2018	Provisional		
NGR	Nigeria	(M, W)	1989	Full	Yes	
SLE	Sierra Leone	(M, W)	2021	Full	Yes	
RSA	South Africa	(M, W)	1935	Full	Yes	
SSD	South Sudan	(M, W)	2020	Full		
TAN	Tanzania	(M, W)	2014	Full	Yes	
TOG	Togo	(M, W)	1996	Full	Yes	
TUN	Tunisia	(M, W)	1920	Full	Yes	
UGA	Uganda	(M, W)	1989	Full	Yes	
ZAM	Zambia	(M, W)	1979	Full	Yes	
ZIM	Zimbabwe	(M, W)	1952	Full	Yes	

==== Former members ====
These nations were members in the IBF but do not currently have membership in the WBSC and are not listed on WBSC Africa's website as of 2026.

Association	National teams
Angola	(M, W)
Botswana	(M, W)
Liberia	(M, W)
Morocco	(M, W)
Namibia	(M, W)

=== Softball ===
Code	Association	National teams	Founded	Membership	IOC member	Note
BEN	Benin	(M, W)	2018	Full	Yes	
BOT	Botswana	(M, W)	1977	Full	Yes	
BUR	Burkina Faso	(M, W)	2004	Full	Yes	
CMR	Cameroon	(M, W)	1997	Full	Yes	
CPV	Cape Verde	(M, W)	2020	Full	Yes	
CHA	Chad	(M, W)	2005	Full		
EGY	Egypt	(M, W)	2018	Full	Yes	
GAM	(The Gambia) Gambia	(M, W)	2009	Full	Yes	
GHA	Ghana	(M, W)	1992	Full	Yes	
GUI	Guinea	(M, W)	2008	Provisional		
KEN	Kenya	(M, W)	1986	Full	Yes	
LES	Lesotho	(M, W)	1994	Full	Yes	
NIG	Niger	(M, W)	2018	Full		
NGR	Nigeria	(M, W)	1989	Full	Yes	
SEN	Senegal	(M, W)	2000	Full	Yes	
RSA	South Africa	(M, W)	1994	Full	Yes	
SSD	South Sudan	(M, W)	2020	Full		
TAN	Tanzania	(M, W)	2014	Full	Yes	
TUN	Tunisia	(M, W)	1920	Full	Yes	
UGA	Uganda	(M, W)	1989	Full	Yes	
ZAM	Zambia	(M, W)	1979	Full	Yes	
ZIM	Zimbabwe	(M, W)	2008	Full	Yes	

==== Former members ====
These nations are not listed on WBSC Africa's website as of 2026.

Association	National teams
(Democratic Republic of the Congo) Congo	(M, W)
Guinea-Bissau	(M, W)
Ivory Coast	(M, W)
Liberia	(M, W)
Mali	(M, W)
Namibia	(M, W)
Sierra Leone	(M, W)

== WBSC World Rankings ==
=== Baseball ===
WBSC Men's Rankings (as of 26 March 2026)
Africa*	WBSC	+/-	National Team	Points
1	23	Steady	South Africa	479
2	49	Steady	Uganda	81
3	63	Steady	Kenya	26
4	64	Steady	South Sudan	25
5	81	▼1	Tanzania	4
*Local rankings based on WBSC ranking points

WBSC Women's Rankings (as of 31 December 2025)
Africa*	WBSC	+/-	National Team	Points
1	25	▲2	South Africa	20
*Local rankings based on WBSC ranking points

=== Softball ===
WBSC Men's Softball Rankings (as of 31 December 2025)
Africa*	WBSC	+/-	National Team	Points
1	14	Steady	South Africa	425
2	30	▲2	Botswana	73
3	39	Steady	Kenya	7
4	40	▼2	Lesotho	6
5	41	▼1	Uganda	3
*Local rankings based on WBSC ranking points

WBSC Women's Rankings (as of 31 December 2025)
Africa*	WBSC	+/-	National Team	Points
1	36	▲1	South Africa	240
2	46	▼4	Botswana	120
3	53	Steady	Uganda	66
4	64	▼10	Kenya	12
*Local rankings based on WBSC ranking points

=== Baseball5 ===
WBSC Baseball5's Rankings (as of 31 December 2025)
Africa*	WBSC	+/-	National Team	Points
1	5	Steady	Tunisia	3606
2	9	Steady	Kenya	2538
3	14	Steady	South Africa	1621
4	17	▼1	Ghana	1055
5	22	Steady	Zambia	849
6	25	▼2	Tanzania	506
7	33	▲6	Cape Verde	325
8	45	▼2	Lesotho	159
9	47	Steady	Nigeria	116
10	56	▲3	Burkina Faso	98
11	58	▼2	Zimbabwe	78
12	60	▼2	Uganda	47
13	61	▼1	Senegal	28
14	63	▼2	Ivory Coast	17
15	64	▼2	Benin	13
16	65	▼2	Togo	12
17	67	▼2	Botswana	4
*Local rankings based on WBSC ranking points

=== Historical leaders ===
Highest Ranked Africa member in the WBSC Rankings

Men's baseball

Men's softball

Women's softball

Baseball5

== See also ==
- World Baseball Softball Confederation
- Baseball awards#Africa
