= South African Baseball Union =

- Sport: Baseball
- Jurisdiction: South Africa
- Abbreviation: SABU
- Founded: 1935
- Affiliation: World Baseball Softball Confederation
- Regional affiliation: African Baseball & Softball Association
- Location: 15 Protea Street, 2097 Kensington, Johannesburg
- President: Marc Moreau
- Secretary: Maria Dempsey
- (South Africa)

The South Africa Baseball Union (SABU) is the national governing body of baseball in South Africa. Baseball is played in all provinces, but it is not a major sport especially due to the popularity and relative success of the comparable sport of cricket, in which South Africa is one of the leading countries playing the sport.

The Union is a member of the World Baseball Softball Confederation (WBSC), and the International Baseball Federation (IBAF). SABU is also an affiliate of the South African Sports Confederation and Olympic Committee (SASCOC), which, alongside Sport and Recreation South Africa (SRSA) supervises all organised sport in South Africa.

SABU controls the South African national baseball team, which has participated in several major events such as the Summer Olympics, World Baseball Classic, Baseball World Cup and the African Games.

The most notable South Africa–born baseball players include Gift Ngoepe, Anthony Phillips, and Dylan Unsworth.

== History ==
Baseball in South Africa began in the Witwatersrand. Gold miners from the United States started playing the game in South Africa leading to the establishment of Giants Baseball Club from the Crown Mines baseball team. Transvaal Baseball Association was established in 1905 with one of the early clubs being the Wanderers Baseball Club.

Japanese influence led to the beginning of the sport in Port Elizabeth, after a Japanese ship named the Paris Maru, was marooned in Algoa Bay in 1934, leading to its sailors being stranded for 3 months waiting for the next ship. The sailors consequently organized a game with the locals, who worked for US companies, as well as US missionaries at the Westborne Oval ultimately leading to the establishment of the Eastern Province Baseball Association in 1934.

During World War II, baseball was not played officially, but continued after the war in 1945. One of the first matches involved a US team selected from two visiting US naval warships, USS California and USS Tennessee, with the Americans winning 6–4.

The 1950s marked the golden era for baseball in South Africa, with popular support from both players and locally based American-owned businesses e.g. General Motors. A US side embarked on a South African tour in 1956. Many popular South African international Springbok rugby players displayed strong support for local baseball.

In 1935, the South African Baseball Federation (now South African Baseball Union) was established with its provincial affiliates being; Border, Western Province, Eastern Province, Northern Transvaal and Transvaal. Arthur Berezowski led the Federation for 25 years - 1949 to 1974. 1950 witnessed the rise of Western Province Baseball and Softball Union, comprising 11 baseball and 23 softball teams.

== See also ==
- South Africa national baseball team
- Sports in South Africa
