= 2017 World Baseball Classic qualification =

Qualifying round for the 2017 World Baseball Classic

2016 World Baseball Classic Qualifiers
Tournament details
- Countries: Australia; Mexico; Panama; United States
- Dates: February 11 – September 25, 2016
- Teams: 16

Tournament statistics
- Games played: 24
- Attendance: 111,795 (4,658 per game)

The qualifying Round of the 2017 World Baseball Classic, officially called the 2016 World Baseball Classic Qualifiers was held from February 11 to September 25, 2016. Teams which participated at the 2013 World Baseball Classic were automatically qualified for the 2017 tournament except the four nations which ended up last in their respective groups: Australia, Brazil, Mexico, and Spain had to play in the qualifiers along with 12 other national teams. 16 teams participated, divided into four groups of four teams each. The winners of each of the four groups qualified for the 2017 World Baseball Classic.

The qualifiers were organized as four independent modified double-elimination tournaments featuring four teams each. The final game was winner-take-all, even if won by the team emerging from the loser's bracket. That is, the team emerging from the winner's bracket might be eliminated despite losing only one game.

Australia, Mexico, Colombia, and Israel won their qualifiers and participated in the 2017 tournament. In their respective brackets, both Australia and Mexico were top seed (signified by home-field advantage) as well as the team that had competed in the 2013 tournament. However, Colombia defeated top seed Panama as well as 2013 participant Spain to advance, while top seed Israel defeated 2013 participant Brazil.

== Players ==
=== Minor league players ===
Qualifier 1 featured 16 players who were affiliated with Major League clubs. Nine MLB-affiliated players were on the Australia roster, three on the South Africa roster, two on the New Zealand roster, and two on the Philippines roster.

Qualifier 2 featured 34 players who were affiliated with Major League clubs. Sixteen MLB-affiliated players were on the Mexico roster (representing 57% of the Mexico roster), eleven on the Nicaragua roster, six on the Germany roster, and one on the Czech Republic roster.

Qualifier 3 featured 31 players who were affiliated with Major League clubs. Sixteen MLB-affiliated players were on the Colombia roster (representing 57% of the Colombia roster), ten on the Panama roster, four on the Spain roster, and one on the France roster.

Qualifier 4 featured 41 players who were affiliated with Major League clubs. Twenty MLB-affiliated players were on the Israel roster and four more Israel players were recent Major Leaguers (together representing 86% of the Israel roster), twelve MLB-affiliated players were on the Great Britain roster, nine on the Brazil roster, and none on the Pakistan roster.

=== Experienced Major League players ===
Only a few experienced Major Leaguers participated in the spring qualifiers. These included relief pitcher Peter Moylan of Australia, first baseman Adrián González and pitcher Óliver Pérez, both of Mexico, and catcher Carlos Ruiz of Panama.

Qualifier 4 took place in September, after the end of the minor league season but during the Major League season, and thus no active Major League players participated. Although Brazil had a few young Major League players, Israel was the team most likely to be adversely affected by this circumstance. In 2013, Israel also was placed in a qualifier that took place during the Major League season and thus was unable to include a number of Major League players of Jewish descent who had expressed interest in playing for Israel. Without these players, Israel narrowly lost its 2013 qualifier to Spain.

Israel's roster included eight former Major Leaguers: catcher Ryan Lavarnway, infielders Ike Davis, Cody Decker, Nate Freiman and Josh Satin, and pitchers Josh Zeid, Jason Marquis and Craig Breslow. On the other hand, infielder Ty Kelly, one of Israel's twenty minor leaguers, had to withdraw from the qualifier after he was called up to the New York Mets.

== Venues ==
Four stadiums were used during the qualifying round:

Qualifier 1	Qualifier 2	Qualifier 3	Qualifier 4
Sydney, Australia	Mexicali, Mexico	Panama City, Panama	New York City, United States
Blacktown Baseball Stadium	Estadio B'Air	Estadio Nacional Rod Carew	MCU Park
Capacity: 3,000	Capacity: 19,500	Capacity: 27,000	Capacity: 7,000

== Pools composition ==
Note: Numbers in parentheses indicate positions in the WBSC World Rankings at the time of the tournament.

Qualifier 1	Qualifier 2	Qualifier 3	Qualifier 4
Australia (11)	Mexico (6)	Colombia (19)	Brazil (17)
New Zealand (27)	Czech Republic (14)	France (25)	Great Britain (29)
Philippines (34)	Germany (20)	Panama (15)	Israel (41)
South Africa (28)	Nicaragua (16)	Spain (21)	Pakistan (24)

Pakistan was the only team in the 2017 qualifiers participating in the World Baseball Classic for the first time. It replaced Thailand, which participated in the 2013 qualifiers.

== Qualifying round ==
=== Qualifier 1 ===
Australia won all three of its games to advance. South Africa defeated New Zealand in the opening round and again in the losers' bracket to reach the final game, but lost to Australia 12–5.

Preliminaries
–	South Africa	7
–	New Zealand	1
–	Philippines	1
–	Australia	11
Lower round 1
L1	New Zealand	17
L2	Philippines	7

Semifinals
W1	South Africa	1
W2	Australia	4
Lower final
W3	New Zealand	2
L4	South Africa	9

Qualifier
W4	Australia	12
W5	South Africa	5

Date	Local time	Road team	Score	Home team	Inn.	Venue	Game duration	Attendance	Boxscore
Feb 11, 2016	13:00	South Africa	7–1	New Zealand		Blacktown Baseball Stadium	2:58	529	Boxscore
Feb 11, 2016	19:30	Philippines	1–11	Australia	7	Blacktown Baseball Stadium	2:56	1,442	Boxscore
Feb 12, 2016	13:00	Philippines	7–17	New Zealand	8	Blacktown Baseball Stadium	3:18	623	Boxscore
Feb 12, 2016	19:30	South Africa	1–4	Australia		Blacktown Baseball Stadium	2:46	2,237	Boxscore
Feb 13, 2016	18:30	South Africa	9–2	New Zealand		Blacktown Baseball Stadium	3:32	1,367	Boxscore
Feb 14, 2016	14:00	South Africa	5–12	Australia		Blacktown Baseball Stadium	3:29	1,766	Boxscore

=== Qualifier 2 ===
Mexico won all three of its games to advance. Nicaragua defeated both of the other two teams but lost by wide margins in both of its games against Mexico. The Czech Republic performed surprisingly well, giving close games to both Mexico and Nicaragua and defeating Germany by a wide margin.

Preliminaries
–	Germany	4
–	Nicaragua	5
–	Czech Republic	1
–	Mexico	2
Lower round 1
L1	Germany	3
L2	Czech Republic	15

Semifinals
W1	Nicaragua	0
W2	Mexico	11
Lower final
W3	Czech Republic	6
L4	Nicaragua	7

Qualifier
W4	Mexico	12
W5	Nicaragua	1

Date	Local time	Road team	Score	Home team	Inn.	Venue	Game duration	Attendance	Boxscore
Mar 17, 2016	12:30	Germany	4–5	Nicaragua	10	Estadio B'Air	3:34	3,773	Boxscore
Mar 17, 2016	19:30	Czech Republic	1–2	Mexico		Estadio B'Air	2:29	14,711	Boxscore
Mar 18, 2016	12:30	Czech Republic	15–3	Germany	8	Estadio B'Air	2:59	2,187	Boxscore
Mar 18, 2016	19:30	Nicaragua	0–11	Mexico	7	Estadio B'Air	2:32	12,715	Boxscore
Mar 19, 2016	18:00	Nicaragua	7–6	Czech Republic	11	Estadio B'Air	3:57	6,558	Boxscore
Mar 20, 2016	19:00	Nicaragua	1–12	Mexico	7	Estadio B'Air	2:48	16,521	Boxscore

=== Qualifier 3 ===
In the opening round, hosts Panama defeated France while 2013 participant Spain fell to Colombia. France then eliminated Spain while Colombia defeated Panama. Panama eliminated France to gain a rematch against Colombia, which won the final game 2–1.

Preliminaries
–	Colombia	9
–	Spain	2
–	France	2
–	Panama	9
Lower round 1
L1	Spain	3
L2	France	5

Semifinals
W1	Colombia	6
W2	Panama	3
Lower final
W3	France	4
L4	Panama	7

Qualifier
W4	Colombia	2
W5	Panama	1

Date	Local time	Road team	Score	Home team	Inn.	Venue	Game duration	Attendance	Boxscore
Mar 17, 2016	13:00	Colombia	9–2	Spain		Rod Carew Stadium	3:42	2,145	Boxscore
Mar 17, 2016	20:00	France	2–9	Panama		Rod Carew Stadium	2:41	11,744	Boxscore
Mar 18, 2016	13:00	France	5–3	Spain		Rod Carew Stadium	3:42	852	Boxscore
Mar 18, 2016	20:00	Colombia	6–3	Panama		Rod Carew Stadium	3:11	12,559	Boxscore
Mar 19, 2016	20:00	Panama	7–4	France		Rod Carew Stadium	3:19	2,016	Boxscore
Mar 20, 2016	18:00	Panama	1–2	Colombia		Rod Carew Stadium	3:07	6,204	Boxscore

=== Qualifier 4 ===
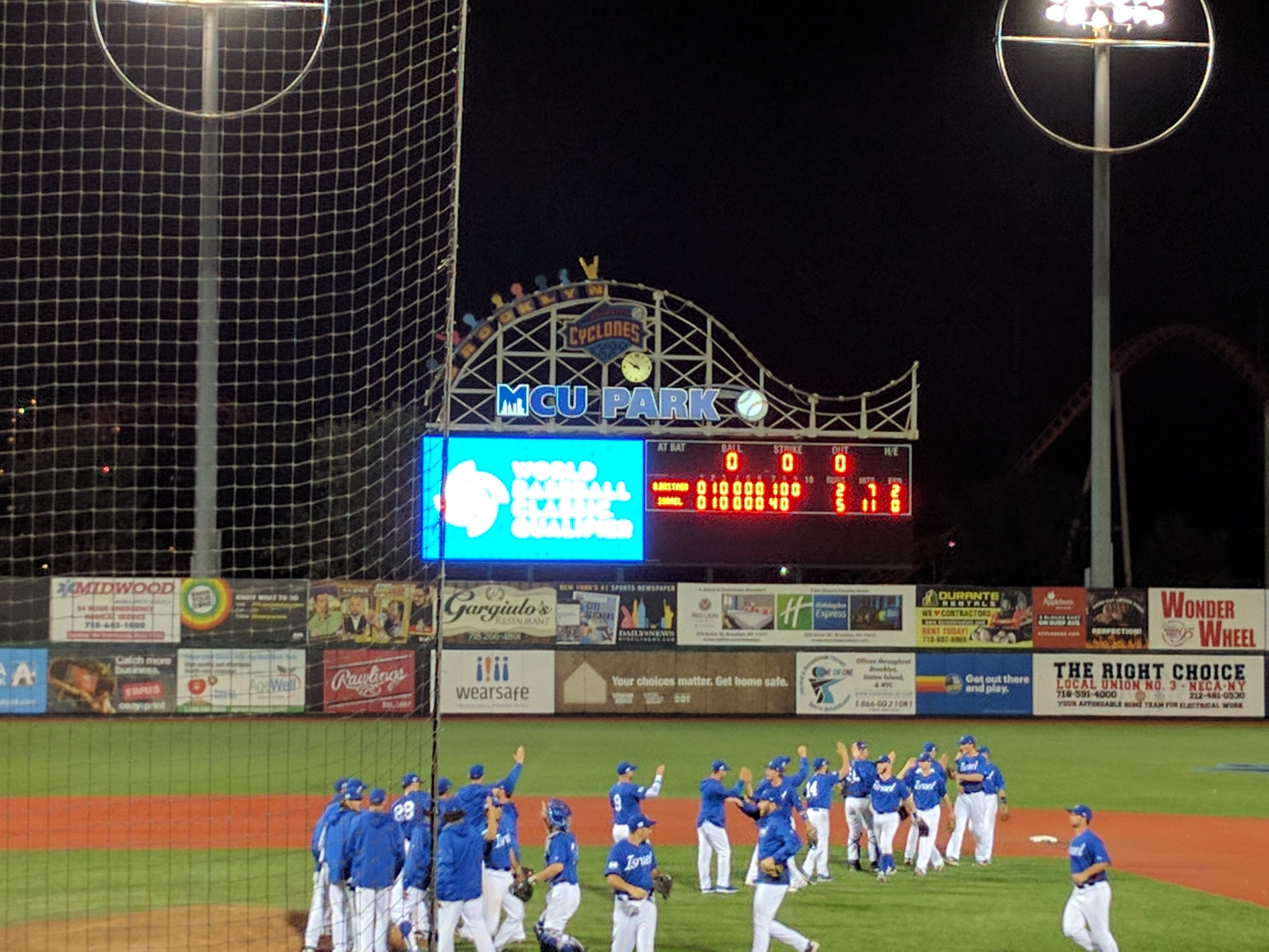
Team Israel celebrating on the field after defeating Great Britain on September 22, 2016.

In the opening round, Israel defeated Great Britain while 2013 participant Brazil defeated Pakistan. Great Britain then eliminated Pakistan while Israel defeated Brazil. Great Britain eliminated Brazil to gain a rematch against Israel, which won the final game 9–1.

Preliminaries
–	Pakistan	0
–	Brazil	10
–	Great Britain	2
–	Israel	5
Lower round 1
L1	Pakistan	0
L2	Great Britain	14

Semifinals
W1	Brazil	0
W2	Israel	1
Lower final
W4	Great Britain	4
L3	Brazil	3

Qualifier
W3	Israel	9
W5	Great Britain	1

Date	Local time	Road team	Score	Home team	Inn.	Venue	Game duration	Attendance	Boxscore
Sep 22, 2016	12:00	Pakistan	0–10	Brazil	7	MCU Park	2:40	1,210	Boxscore
Sep 22, 2016	19:00	Great Britain	2–5	Israel		MCU Park	3:08	3,919	Boxscore
Sep 23, 2016	12:00	Brazil	0–1	Israel		MCU Park	2:56	1,862	Boxscore
Sep 23, 2016	19:00	Great Britain	14–0	Pakistan	7	MCU Park	2:49	1,359	Boxscore
Sep 24, 2016	20:00	Brazil	3–4	Great Britain		MCU Park	2:54	1,480	Boxscore
Sep 25, 2016	18:00	Great Britain	1–9	Israel		MCU Park	2:44	2,016	Boxscore

== Attendance ==
111,795 (avg. 4,658; pct. 33.0%)

- Qualifier 1 – 7,964 (avg. 1,327; pct. 44.2%)
- Qualifier 2 – 56,465 (avg. 9,411; pct. 48.3%)
- Qualifier 3 – 35,520 (avg. 5,920; pct. 21.9%)
- Qualifier 4 – 11,846 (avg. 1,974; pct. 28.2%)

== Statistics leaders ==
=== Batting ===
Statistic	Name	Total/Avg
Batting average*	(Philippines) Eric Farris	.625
Hits	(United Kingdom) Champ Stuart	7
Runs	(South Africa) Anthony Phillips	7
Home runs	(Panama) Javier Guerra (Panama) Carlos Ruiz	2
RBI	(New Zealand) Boss Monaroa	8
Strikeouts	(Colombia) Steve Brown (United Kingdom) Jazz Chisholm Jr. (Czech Republic) Matej Hejma (United Kingdom) Champ Stuart	6
Stolen bases	(Brazil) Gabriel Maciel (Brazil) Leonardo Reginatto	3
On-base percentage*	(Mexico) Adrián González	.667
Slugging percentage*	(Germany) Bruce Maxwell (Australia) Trent Oeltjen (Panama) Carlos Ruiz	1.000
OPS*	(Australia) Trent Oeltjen	1.615

* Minimum 2.7 plate appearances per game

=== Pitching ===
Statistic	Name	Total/Avg
Wins	24 Players	1
Losses	24 Players	1
Saves	(Israel) Brad Goldberg (Australia) Ryan Searle	2
Innings pitched	(South Africa) Dylan Unsworth	8.0
Hits allowed	(South Africa) Carl Michaels	12
Runs allowed	(France) Owen Ozanich	7
Earned runs allowed	(Philippines) Taylor Garrison (South Africa) Carl Michaels	6
ERA*	(Israel) Corey Baker	0.00**
Walks	(New Zealand) Blair Johnstone (Nicaragua) Carlos Teller	5
Strikeouts	(Israel) Josh Zeid	9
WHIP*	(Colombia) Yesid Salazar	0.00

* Minimum 0.8 innings pitched per game
** Baker is tied with others with a 0.00 ERA but he pitched the most innings with 5.0

== Additional rules ==
A pitcher threw no more than 85 pitches per game in the Qualifying Round unless the pitcher needed more to complete a batter's plate appearance.

A pitcher must:

- Not pitch until a minimum of four days have passed since he last pitched if he threw 50 or more pitches when he last pitched;
- Not pitch until a minimum of one day has passed since he last pitched if he threw 30 or more pitches when he last pitched;
- Not pitch until a minimum of one day has passed since any second consecutive day on which the pitcher pitched;

A mercy rule came into effect when one team led by either fifteen runs after five innings, or ten runs after seven innings.

An alternative version of the IBAF's extra inning rule was also used. If after 10 innings the score is still tied, each half inning thereafter starts with runners on second and first base. The runners are the eighth and ninth hitters due in that inning respectively. For example, if the number five hitter is due to lead off the inning, the number three hitter is on second base, and the number four hitter on first base. For the first time in the World Baseball Classic, this rule was actually employed in this year's qualifiers, as the Qualifier 2 game between Nicaragua and the Czech Republic went into the 11th inning. Nicaragua scored three runs in the top of the inning, the Czech Republic only two in the bottom, so Nicaragua went on to the final game of the bracket.
