= Max Brown =

Max Brown may refer to:

- Max Brown (British actor) (born 1981), English actor
- Max Brown (baseball) (born 1993), New Zealand outfielder
- Max Brown (footballer) (born 1999), English footballer
- Max Brown (novelist) (1916–2003), Australian novelist
- Max Brown (rugby league) (born 1946), Australian rugby league footballer
- Max Brown (politician) (died 2012), Australian politician
- Max Brown (Australian actor), Australian actor
- Max Brown (canoeist) (born 1995), New Zealand canoeist
- Max Brown (American football) (born 2003), American football player

== See also ==
- Maxwell Brown (disambiguation)
- Max Browne (born 1995), American football player
