= Maxwell Brown =

Maxwell Brown may refer to:

- Maxwell Brown (baseball) (born 1993), New Zealand baseball outfielder
- Maxwell Brown (politician) (died 2012), Australian politician
- Maxwell Brown (novelist) (1916–2003), Australian novelist and journalist
- Maxwell Brown (tennis) in 1958 U.S. National Championships – Men's Singles

== See also ==
- Max Brown (disambiguation)
