= Lesotho national baseball team =

Information
- Country: Lesotho
- Federation: Lesotho Baseball and Softball Association
- Confederation: WBSC Africa

WBSC ranking
- Current: NR (26 October 2026)

The Lesotho Baseball and Softball Association (LSBA) is a body responsible for development and organization of baseball and softball sporting activities in Lesotho. The Association also represents Lesotho on baseball and softball internationally. The LBSA was established by an act of memorandum of association registered with the register of companies at Law Office, the LBSA was founded in 1996. Tseliso Lemphane is the president of the association.

The men's national team competed at the All-Africa Games in 1999 and 2003.

The LSBA also oversees the Lesotho men's national softball team.

== Tournament record ==
=== All-Africa Games ===
All-Africa Games record
Year	Host	Position	W	L	RS	RA	Ref
1999	South Africa	5th	2	3	39	105	
2003	Nigeria	5th	0	4	22	40	
Total	2/2		2	7	61	145	

1999 All-Africa Games

9 September; 10:00	South Africa	43–0 (F/5)	Lesotho	Randburg Sports Stadium
9 September; 10:00	WP: Braydon Bartle	Boxscore	LP: Teboho Shelile	Randburg Sports Stadium

11 September; 09:00	Lesotho	18–14 (F/6)	Ghana	Randburg Sports Stadium
11 September; 09:00	WP: Justice Tsuniyane	Boxscore	LP: Joshua Amponsah	Randburg Sports Stadium

12 September; 09:00	Lesotho	5–31 (F/6)	Zimbabwe	Randburg Sports Stadium
12 September; 09:00	LP: Teboho Shelile	Boxscore	WP: Nhauro Mpanguri	Randburg Sports Stadium

13 September; 12:30	Nigeria	14–3 (F/8)	Lesotho	Randburg Sports Stadium
13 September; 12:30	WP: Emmanuel Motoni	Boxscore	LP: Bahzakoana Shelike	Randburg Sports Stadium

15 September; 11:00	Uganda	3–13 (F/7)	Lesotho	Randburg Sports Stadium
15 September; 11:00	LP: Rockfeller Erima	Boxscore	WP: Justice Tsuniyane	Randburg Sports Stadium
