= Neil Adonis =

South African baseball player (born 1969)

Neil Isaac Adonis
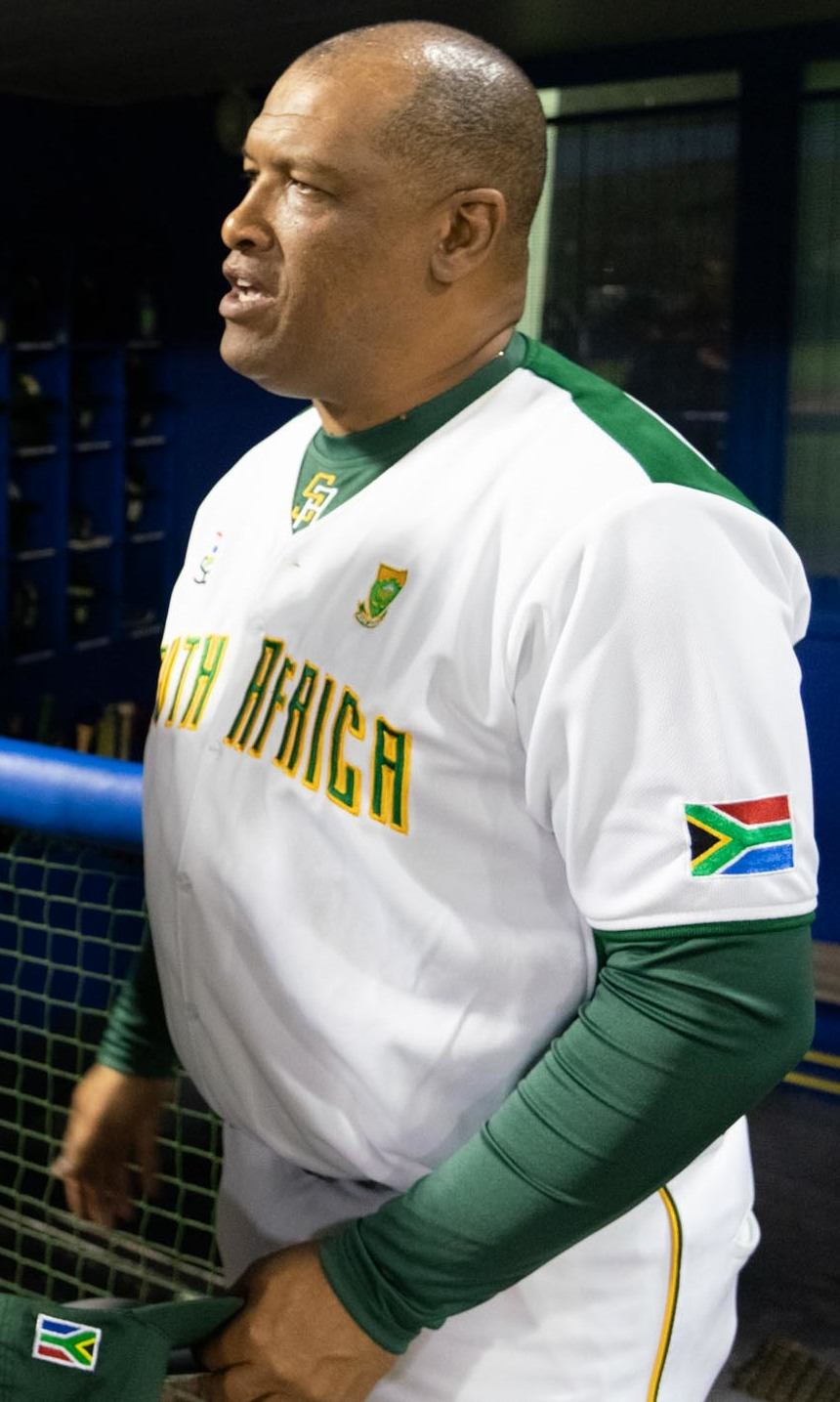
- Adonis at Nino Cavalli Stadium in 2019

Personal information
- Citizenship: South African
- Born: March 1, 1969 (age 57) Cape Town, South Africa
- Height: 5 ft 11.5 in (182 cm)
- Weight: 205 lb (93 kg)

Sport
- Country: South Africa
- Sport: Baseball
- Position: Designated hitter
- Event: Men's baseball

Achievements and titles
- Olympic finals: 2000 Summer Olympics
- Updated on 5 October 2015

Neil Isaac Adonis (born 1 March 1969, in Cape Town) is a South African baseball player. Adonis competed for South Africa at the 2000 Summer Olympics, where he appeared in 3 games as the designated hitter (DH), going 0–8 in his plate appearances. Adonis managed the South African team during the qualifiers for the 2020 Summer Olympics.
