= Uganda national baseball team =

Information
- Country: Uganda
- Federation: Uganda Baseball & Softball Association
- Confederation: WBSC Africa

WBSC ranking
- Current: 46 (26 October 2026)
- Highest: 36 (28 March 2023)
- Lowest: not ranked (most recently in December 2018)

Uniforms
Home

The Uganda national baseball team is the men's national team representing Uganda in international competitions in the sport of baseball. The team is organized by the Uganda Baseball and Softball Association and is a member of WBSC Africa.

Baseball and softball were introduced to Uganda in 1989 by Christian missionaries from Warsaw, Indiana who provided some balls, six bats, and no gloves to three schools.

Uganda has competed in several African tournaments, medalling in the Africa Cup Championship in 2001, which it hosted in Kampala, and 2019 and participating in both baseball competitions in the All-Africa Games, in 1999 and 2003.

The national association also organizes the Uganda Men's Baseball National League, which ran from 2016 to 2022 and restarted in 2026.

Three players from Uganda have signed with Major League Baseball teams. Pitcher Ben Serunkuma and outfielder Umar Male signed with the Los Angeles Dodgers in 2022., though both were released in 2024. Pitcher David Matoma signed with the Pittsburgh Pirates in 2023 and threw a 101 mph (163 km/h) fastball in the minors. The Dodgers also have a youth baseball academy in Mpigi, where Matoma also trained. At least two Ugandan players have played NCAA Division III baseball.

Uganda has also had success at the youth level, winning the 2023 U-12 Baseball World Cup Africa Qualifier and qualifying for the Little League World Series in 2012 and 2015, though lack of funding has limited participation in international tournaments. Uganda finished second at the U-15 Baseball World Cup Africa Qualifier held in 2025.

== Tournament record ==
=== Africa Cup Championship ===
- 2001: (bronze) 3rd
- 2019: (silver) 2nd

=== All-Africa Games ===
All-Africa Games record
Year	Round	Position	W	L	RS	RA
(South Africa) 1999	Round robin	6th	0	5	13	128
(Nigeria) 2003	Semifinals	4th	1	5	27	64
Total	2/2	–	1	10	40	192

1999 All-Africa Games

11 September; 16:00	Uganda	1–27 (F/5)	Nigeria	Randburg Sports Stadium
11 September; 16:00	LP: Henry Odong	Boxscore	WP: Augustine Gabriel	Randburg Sports Stadium

12 September; 16:00	Ghana	27–6 (F/5)	Uganda	Randburg Sports Stadium
12 September; 16:00	WP: Ishmael Abayaa	Boxscore	LP: Henry Odong	Randburg Sports Stadium

13 September; 09:00	South Africa	31–0 (F/7)	Uganda	Randburg Sports Stadium
13 September; 09:00	WP: Vaughn Beariman	Boxscore	LP: Rockfeller Erima	Randburg Sports Stadium

14 September; 11:00	Uganda	1–30 (F/6)	Zimbabwe	Randburg Sports Stadium
14 September; 11:00	LP: Henry Odong	Boxscore	WP: Nhauro Mpanguri	Randburg Sports Stadium

15 September; 11:00	Uganda	3–13 (F/7)	Lesotho	Randburg Sports Stadium
15 September; 11:00	LP: Rockfeller Erima	Boxscore	WP: Justice Tsuniyane	Randburg Sports Stadium

== See also ==
- Sport in Uganda
- Uganda women's national under-19 cricket team
- Uganda national cricket team
- Uganda men's national lacrosse team
