= Max Brown (baseball) =

New Zealand baseball player

Auckland Tuatara – No. 11
- Outfielder
- Born: 30 April 1993 (age 33); Seattle, Washington
- Bats: Right Throws: Right

Maxwell Houston Brown (born 30 April, 1993) is a New Zealand-American professional baseball outfielder for the Auckland Tuatara of the Australian Baseball League.

== Career ==
Brown was born in Seattle, Washington to an American mother and New Zealander father and grew up in North Bend, Washington. After attending Kansas State University and hitting .297/.373/.400 in his NCAA Division I career, Brown was drafted by the Arizona Diamondbacks in the 37th round of the 2015 Major League Baseball draft. He played for the Arizona League Diamondbacks for the rest of 2015 and in 2016 was promoted to the Missoula Osprey and Hillsboro Hops before being released following the 2016 season.

Brown continued his professional baseball career, playing with the Adelaide Bite after moving to South Australia to play with Glenelg Baseball Club. He played only nine games for the team across 2016 to 2018.

With the addition of the Auckland Tuatara for the 2018–19 Australian Baseball League season, Brown was one of the first players to sign with the team, playing all 40 games. He re-signed with the club in 2019.

=== National team career ===
As a 20-year-old, he made his debut for the New Zealand national baseball team in the 2013 World Baseball Classic Qualifiers, batting .154 as New Zealand failed to qualify over Chinese Taipei.

In the 2017 World Baseball Classic Qualifiers as the starting centerfielder, he batted .184 as they were eliminated by South Africa and finished behind eventual qualifiers Australia.
