= Sha Tzu-chen =

Taiwanese baseball player (born 2003)

Athletics
- Pitcher
- Born: 15 October 2003 (age 22); Taipei, Taiwan
- Bats: Right Throws: Right
- Stats at Baseball Reference

Sha Tzu-chen
- Chinese: 沙子宸
Transcriptions
Standard Mandarin
- Hanyu Pinyin: Shā Zǐchén
- Wade–Giles: Sha^{1} Tzu^{3}-chen^{2}

Sha Tzu-chen (born 15 October 2003) is a Taiwanese professional baseball pitcher in the Athletics organization.

== Amateur career ==
At Guangfu Elementary School in Taipei, Sha played five-a-side football. He was not formally introduced to baseball until fifth grade, when his father, acting on a friend's suggestion, asked him and his younger brother if they would like to form a team. Sha focused on baseball while a student of Changhua Arts High School.

== International career ==
Sha was a member of the Chinese Taipei national baseball team during the 2024 U-23 Baseball World Cup, facing South Korea and Nicaragua. He was selected to the national team roster for the World Baseball Classic 2025 Qualifiers, and served as the youngest member of the starting rotation. Sha pitched 2 2/3 innings against South Africa, leaving to treat a cramp in his right foot. Sha joined Chinese Taipei for the 2026 World Baseball Classic as well.

== Professional career ==
Sha signed with the Oakland Athletics in February 2023 as an international free agent out of the National Taiwan Sport University, and attended the team's inaugural Taiwan Heritage Day later that year. Sha split 2023 with the Arizona Complex League Athletics and the Stockton Ports. He began the 2024 season on the Ports' Opening Day roster, making appearances as a starter and reliever while recording a 2–6 win–loss record and 6.33 ERA. Sha was reassigned to Stockton at the start of the 2025 season. In the first appearance of his season, Sha took part in a combined no-hitter, striking out six batters over three innings of relief. In June, Sha was promoted to the Lansing Lugnuts. Sha began the 2026 season with Lansing.

== Pitching style ==
Sha set a career high in pitch speed (152 kilometers per hour) during the World Baseball Classic 2025 Qualifiers.
