= Kenya national baseball team =

Information
- Country: Kenya
- Federation: Baseball Federation of Kenya
- Confederation: WBSC Africa

WBSC ranking
- Current: 63 (26 March 2026)
- Highest: 48 (28 March 2023)

The Kenya national baseball team is the baseball team which represents the Republic of Kenya in international baseball competitions. The team is organized by the Baseball Federation of Kenya, which was founded in 2002, and is part of WBSC Africa.

Baseball is a minor sport in Kenya. United States marines introduced baseball to the country in the 1970s. The Japanese International Cooperation Agency and other organizations helped start a Little League in 1997. The Japan-Africa Baseball & Softball Foundation has also supported the sport in Kenya and other African countries, including sponsoring a high school tournament named after Japan's Kōshien tournaments. Kenyan capital city Nairobi has one baseball field that meets WBSC specifications.

Kenya finished fourth at the 2001 African Baseball Cup and second in the 2017 East Africa Championship. The team qualified for the 2019 African Baseball Championship, a 2020 Olympics qualifier, by beating Tanzania at Bechtel Baseball Park in Nairobi. Australia's national coach, Steve Fish, coached the team. However, Kenya did not compete in the continental tournament.

The Kenyan federation also organizes a Baseball5 team that was ranked in the top 10 worldwide at the end of 2025.
