= Lesotho men's national softball team =

Lesotho men's national softball team is the national team for Lesotho. The team competed at the 2000 ISF Men's World Championship in East London, South Africa where they finished sixteenth.
