= Baseball at the African Games =

- Baseball
- Frequency: Every four years
- Inaugurated: 1999 (South Africa) Johannesburg
- Most recent: 2003 (Nigeria) Abuja
- Most successful team(s): South Africa (RSA)

Baseball has been an event at the African Games in Johannesburg, South Africa in 1999 and in Abuja, Nigeria in 2003. South Africa won both tournaments, winning all its games. Nigeria and Zimbabwe finished second and third, respectively, in both events.

== Tournament results ==
Baseball
Year	Host	Gold	Silver	Bronze	Ref
1999; Details	(South Africa); Johannesburg	South Africa	Nigeria	Zimbabwe
2003; Details	(Nigeria); Abuja	South Africa	Nigeria	Zimbabwe

== Medal table ==
Rank	Nation	Gold	Silver	Bronze	Total
1	South Africa	2	0	0	2
2	Nigeria	0	2	0	2
3	Zimbabwe	0	0	2	2
Totals (3 entries)		2	2	2	6

== See also ==
- Baseball awards#Africa
- African Baseball & Softball Association
