= Anthony Phillips (baseball) =

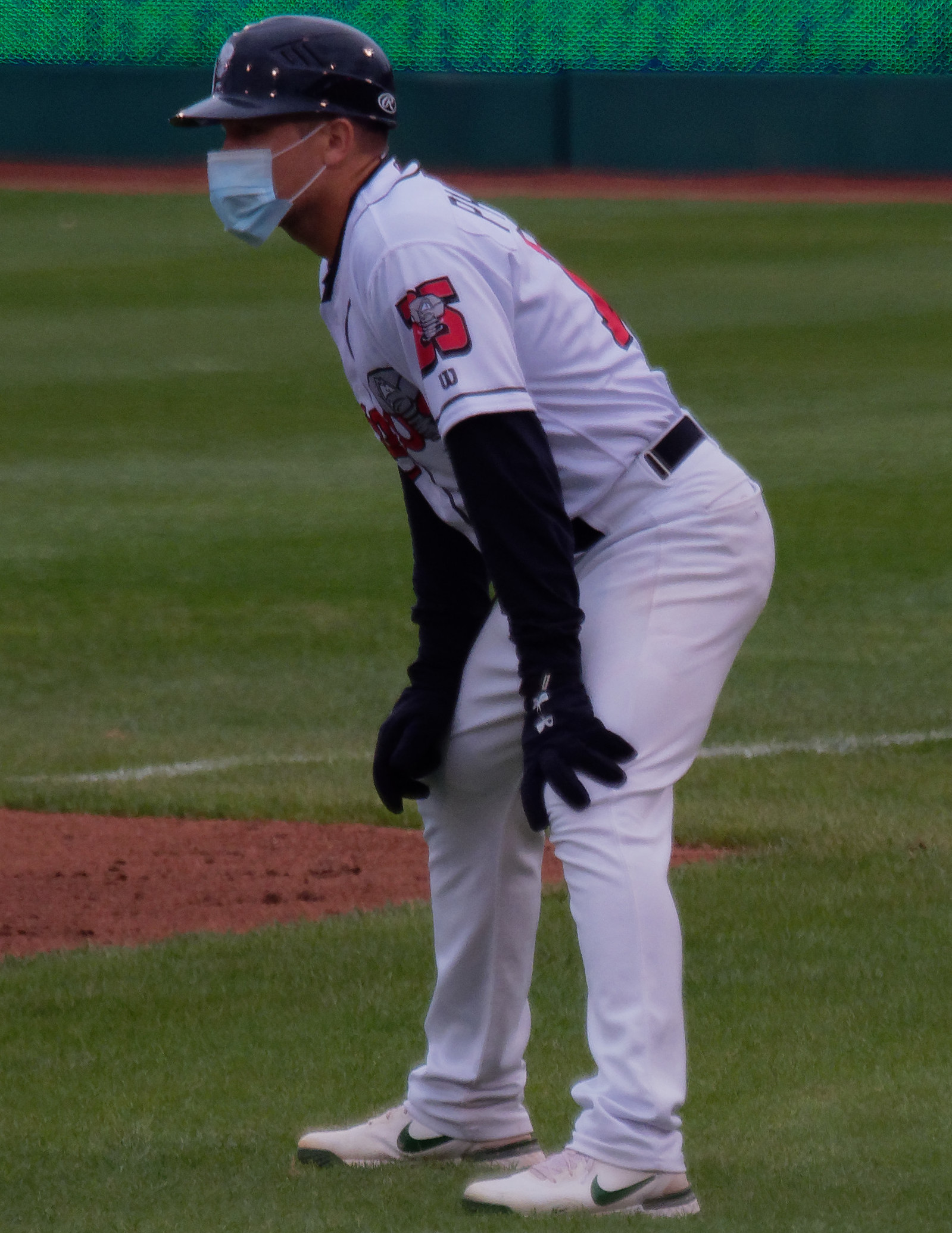
- Phillips with the Lansing Lugnuts in 2021
- Shortstop / Second baseman
- Born: 11 April 1990 (age 36); Bellville, South Africa
- Bats: Right Throws: Right
- Stats at Baseball Reference

Anthony Gareth Phillips (born 11 April 1990) is a South African former professional baseball infielder. He has been a member of the Seattle Mariners, Philadelphia Phillies, Los Angeles Angels of Anaheim and Colorado Rockies organizations. He bats and throws right-handed. He has been compared to a "young Chuck Knoblauch" by the Seattle Post-Intelligencer. José Moreno, Phillips' former manager, compared his style of play to that of David Eckstein. While not officially retired, Phillips is now a minor league coach.

== Professional career ==
=== Seattle Mariners ===
Born in Bellville, Western Cape, South Africa, Phillips was scouted by Pat Kelly and Phillip Biersteker to sign with the Seattle Mariners at age 16 after his participation in the 2006 World Baseball Junior Championship. He began his professional career with the rookie-level Arizona League Mariners. Phillips batted .279 with 24 runs, 34 hits, 1 double, 9 RBIs and 5 stolen bases in 45 games. In the next season, he played with three levels of the Mariners' organization including the rookie-level Pulaski Mariners, the Class-A Short Season Everett AquaSox and the Class-A Advanced High Desert Mavericks. With Pulaski, he batted .196 with 7 runs, 11 hits, 1 double, 4 RBIs and 4 stolen bases in 14 games. He played 51 games with the AquaSox and batted .187 with 23 runs, 28 hits, 5 doubles, 1 triple, 2 home runs, 17 RBIs and 5 stolen bases. Finally, with the Mavericks, Phillips batted .111 with 1 hit and 1 RBI in 3 games. He hit his first career home run on 10 July against the Tri-City Dust Devils. He spent the 2009 season with the Class-A Short Season Everett AquaSox and batted .247 with 29 runs, 59 hits, 8 doubles, 3 triples, 7 home runs, 28 RBIs and 3 stolen bases in 68 games. He was first on the AquaSox in caught stealing (8) and second in at-bats (239), home runs and strikeouts (65). He began the 2010 season with the Triple-A Tacoma Rainiers but, after just one game, he was assigned to extended spring training.

=== Philadelphia Phillies ===
Phillips signed a minor league deal with the Philadelphia Phillies in December 2013. Over the course of the 2014 season, he played with three different teams in the Phillies' minor league system.

=== St. Paul Saints ===
For the 2015 season, Phillips played for the St. Paul Saints in the independent American Association.

=== Los Angeles Angels of Anaheim ===
On 23 January 2016, Phillips signed a minor league contract with the Los Angeles Angels of Anaheim. He played in 114 games for the Double–A Arkansas Travelers, hitting .259/.333/.317 with one home run, 37 RBI, and nine stolen bases. Phillips elected free agency following the season on 7 November.

=== Colorado Rockies ===
On 10 January 2017, Phillips signed a minor league deal with the Colorado Rockies. He was released on 15 June 2018.

=== St. Paul Saints (second stint) ===
On 21 June 2018, Phillips signed with the St. Paul Saints of the American Association of Independent Professional Baseball. He was released on 6 August.

=== Kansas City T-Bones ===
On 17 August 2018, Phillips signed with the Kansas City T-Bones of the American Association. He hit for the Cycle to put them in the playoffs and they won the championship in 2018. He was released on 14 November 2018

== Coaching career ==
In December 2018, Phillips became the bench coach for the Beloit Snappers, a minor league affiliate of the Oakland Athletics.

== International career ==
He was selected to play in the 2009 World Baseball Classic for South Africa. He played two games and batted .222 with 1 run, 2 hits and 1 RBI.

He competed at the Africa/Europe 2020 Olympic Qualification tournament in Italy in September 2019.

== Personal life ==
His father, Alan Phillips, played in the 2000 Summer Olympics at age 44, making him the oldest man ever on an Olympic baseball roster. His brother, Jonathan Phillips (born 16 April 1986), played in the Milwaukee Brewers organization in 2003. Growing up, Phillips was a fan of Ken Griffey Jr. and played rugby and badminton. He is not related to Tony Phillips.
