= Cameroon national baseball team =

Information
- Country: Cameroon
- Federation: Cameroon Baseball & Softball Federation
- Confederation: WBSC Africa

WBSC ranking
- Current: NR (31 December 2025)

The Cameroon national baseball team is the national baseball team of Cameroon. The team is controlled by the Cameroon Baseball and Softball Federation, which is represented in WBSC Africa.
