= Ghana national baseball team =

Information
- Country: Ghana
- Federation: GBSF
- Confederation: ABSA

WBSC ranking
- Current: NR (26 March 2026)

The Ghana national baseball team, nicknamed the Rising Stars, is the national baseball team of Ghana. They are currently the 3rd team in Africa and the 42nd ranked men's baseball team in the IBAF World Rankings.

In June 2008, US President George W. Bush, Ghanaian Vice-president Aliu Mahama and outgoing US ambassador Pamela Bridgewater were honoured for their work in developing baseball and softball in the country.

The team is controlled by the Ghana Baseball & Softball Federation, which is represented in the African Baseball & Softball Association.

== Tournament results ==
=== All-Africa Games ===
All-Africa Games record
Year	Host	Position	W	L	RS	RA
1999	South Africa	4th	2	3	93	80
2003	Nigeria	6th	Unavailable			
Total	2/2		-	-	-	-

1999 All-Africa Games

11 September; 09:00	Lesotho	18–14 (F/6)	Ghana	(South Africa) Randburg Sports Stadium
11 September; 09:00	WP: Justice Tsuniyane	Boxscore	LP: Joshua Amponsah	(South Africa) Randburg Sports Stadium

12 September; 16:00	Ghana	27–6 (F/5)	Uganda	(South Africa) Randburg Sports Stadium
12 September; 16:00	WP: Ishmael Abayaa	Boxscore	LP: Henry Odong	(South Africa) Randburg Sports Stadium

13 September; 14:00	Zimbabwe	10–24 (F/7)	Ghana	(South Africa) Randburg Sports Stadium
13 September; 14:00	LP: Tinei Billiat	Boxscore	WP: Charles Andam	(South Africa) Randburg Sports Stadium

14 September; 15:00	Ghana	3–28 (F/5)	South Africa	(South Africa) Randburg Sports Stadium
14 September; 15:00	LP: Mohammed Sherrif	Boxscore	WP: Wesley Botha	(South Africa) Randburg Sports Stadium

15 September; 15:00	Ghana	5–14 (F/7)	Nigeria	(South Africa) Randburg Sports Stadium
15 September; 15:00	LP: Charles Andam	Boxscore	WP: Emmanuel Motoni	(South Africa) Randburg Sports Stadium
