= Dylan Unsworth =

South African baseball player (born 1992)

- Pitcher
- Born: 23 September 1992 (age 33); Durban, South Africa
- Bats: Right Throws: Right

CPBL debut
- November 6, 2021, for the Fubon Guardians

CPBL statistics (through 2021 season)
- Win–loss record: 1–0
- Earned run average: 2.38
- Strikeouts: 7
- Stats at Baseball Reference

Teams
- Fubon Guardians (2021)

Career highlights and awards
- Pitched a no-hitter on May 28, 2021 (LMB)

Dylan Chowles Unsworth (born 23 September 1992) is a South African professional baseball pitcher who currently is a free agent. He has previously played in the Chinese Professional Baseball League (CPBL) for the Fubon Guardians, as well as in the Mexican League and the Venezuelan League. He also pitches for the South African national baseball team.

== Career ==
=== Seattle Mariners ===
Unsworth attended the European Baseball Academy in Italy in 2009, where he was discovered and signed by the Seattle Mariners on June 20, 2010. In 2010 for the rookie–level Arizona League Mariners, he was 2–5 with a 3.93 ERA in 50 1/3 innings (in which he allowed only one walk). In 2011 in 12 starts for the rookie–level Pulaski Mariners he was 6–5 with a 5.16 ERA in 61 innings.

In 2012 in 14 starts for the Low–A Everett AquaSox, he was 7–2 with a 3.90 ERA in 85 1/3 innings. In 2013 he pitched for the AZL Mariners and Single–A Clinton LumberKings, accumulating a 4–1 with a 2.50 ERA in 72 innings (in which he allowed only two walks), and was a mid-season All Star in the Midwest League. According to Baseball America, in 2013 he was the top control pitcher in the Mariners system. In 2014 in 26 starts for the High–A High Desert Mavericks, he was 6–9 with a 5.88 ERA.

Unsworth split the 2015 season between the High–A Bakersfield Blaze and Double–A Jackson Generals, registering a 5–10 record with a 3.95 ERA in 107 innings. In 2016, he started nine games for the Jackson in the Double–A Southern League, and was 3–1 with a 1.16 ERA in 46 2/3 innings. His feats during the season came despite his fastball not reaching 90 miles per hour, and he was named a mid-season Southern League All Star, but had his season cut short by a hamstring injury. He was named to appear in the 2016 All-Star Futures Game. He pitched in 22 starts for the Tacoma Rainiers of the Triple–A Pacific Coast League and the Arkansas Travelers of the Double–A Texas League in 2017, and was a combined 9–9 with a 3.30 ERA in 128 1/3 innings. Unsworth elected free agency following the season on November 6, 2017.

=== Los Angeles Angels ===
On January 17, 2018, Unsworth signed a minor league contract with the Los Angeles Angels. Pitching in Double–A with the Mobile BayBears and Triple–A with the Salt Lake Bees in 2018, he was a combined 6–4 with a 5.75 ERA in 103 1/3 innings in 15 starts and 9 relief appearances. On November 2, Unsworth became a free agent.

Through 2018, in the minor leagues he was 48–46 with a 4.17 ERA, as in 773 1/3 innings he gave up 847 hits (9.9 per 9 innings) and 121 walks (1.4 per 9 innings) while striking out 625 batters (7.3 per 9 innings). He is known for not overpowering batters with velocity, but rather relying on a good changeup and excellent control.

=== El Águila de Veracruz ===
On February 11, 2020, Unsworth signed with the Pericos de Puebla of the Mexican League. However, he did not pitch with the team as the season was canceled due to the COVID-19 pandemic.

On February 18, 2021, Unsworth signed with El Águila de Veracruz of the Mexican League for the 2021 season. On May 28, Unsworth threw a no-hitter against the Diablos Rojos del México. In 8 appearances with Veracruz, Unsworth recorded a 4–0 record and 2.57 ERA with 27 strikeouts in 42.0 innings of work.

=== Fubon Guardians ===
On July 22, 2021, Unsworth signed with the Fubon Guardians of the Chinese Professional Baseball League (CPBL). Unsworth made his CPBL debut on November 6. He became a free agent following the season.

=== El Águila de Veracruz (second stint) ===
On January 21, 2022, Unsworth signed with El Águila de Veracruz of the Mexican League. In 2 starts for Veracruz, he struggled to an 0-1 record and 11.74 ERA with 3 strikeouts across 7 2/3 innings pitched. Unsworth was released by the team on May 25, after suffering a knee injury that would keep him out for several weeks.

On October 23, 2023, Unsworth was drafted in the sixth round by the Karachi Monarchs, with the 41st overall pick, of the 2023 Baseball United inaugural draft.

On July 5, 2024, Unsworth signed with the Caliente de Durango of the Mexican League. He did not appear in a game for Durango, and was released by the team on February 4, 2025.

=== Caciques de Distrito ===
In 2025, Unsworth signed with the Caciques de Distrito of the Venezuelan Major League.

== International career ==
As a member of the South African national baseball team, Unsworth competed in the 2009 Baseball World Cup, 2013 World Baseball Classic Qualification, and the 2017 World Baseball Classic Qualification.

He competed at the Africa/Europe 2020 Olympic Qualification tournament in Italy in September 2019.
