= New Zealand national baseball team =

Information
- Country: New Zealand
- Federation: Baseball New Zealand
- Confederation: WBSC Oceania
- Manager: Dan Tan
- Team Colors: Black, White

WBSC ranking
- Current: 60 (26 March 2026)
- Highest: 26 (December 2014 – December 2016)
- Lowest: 50 (2 times; latest in June 2021)

The New Zealand national baseball team, also known as the Diamondblacks, is the representative team at the international level for New Zealand. The team is controlled by Baseball New Zealand, the country's governing body. The team competes in the Oceania Championship, where, in 2007, it withdrew from play, giving Australia an automatic berth into the Final qualification tournament for the 2008 Olympics. The "Diamondblacks" nickname is one of many national team nicknames related to the All Blacks.

== Results and fixtures ==
The following is a list of professional baseball match results currently active in the latest version of the WBSC World Rankings, as well as any future matches that have been scheduled.

Legend

Win Lose Void or postponed Fixture

=== 2022 ===
World Baseball Classic Q	September 30	New Zealand	7–12	Brazil	Rod Carew Stadium, Panama
World Baseball Classic Q	12:00 CT	LP: Ben Thompson; HR: Nikau Pouaka-Grego (1)	Boxscore	WP: Gabriel Barbosa; HR: Christian Lopes (1)	Attendance: 105; Umpires: HP: Anthony Perez. 1B: Austin Jones. 2B: Juan Manuel Rodriguez. 3B: Frantisek Pribyl.

World Baseball Classic Q	October 2	New Zealand	1–4	Argentina	Rod Carew Stadium, Panama
World Baseball Classic Q	19:00 CT	LP: Elliot Johnstone; HR: Chayton Krauss (1)	Boxscore	WP: Federico Robles; Sv: Jose Mendoza (1)	Attendance: 193; Umpires: HP: Frantisek Pribyl. 1B: Michael Ulloa. 2B: Mark Stewart. 3B: Austin Jones

== 2013 WBC Qualifiers ==
In 2011, Major League Baseball announced that New Zealand would be among the nations invited to a new qualification round to be held in 2012 for the 2013 World Baseball Classic. Ryan Flynn, Chief Executive of Baseball New Zealand, called the development "the best thing to happen in the history of diamond sports in New Zealand." The Diamondblacks, managed by Andy Skeels, won two games and reached the championship game of the Qualifier, but fell to host Taiwan in the final game. New Zealand's Scott Campbell led all players in the tournament with a .583 batting average (7 for 12 with 2 doubles), while playing an error-free tournament at SS. Teammate Boss Moanaroa hit the tournament's only home run. Seventeen-year-old Mak Fox recorded the win against Thailand, while future Major Leaguer John Holdzkom was credited with the win against the Philippines.

=== 2013 WBC Qualifiers Roster ===
New Zealand roster – 2013 World Baseball Classic Qualifier
Players		Coaches
Pitchers: Landon Adelman; Nick Dawson; Sam Bishop; Joe Boyce; Wayde Bremmer; John Holdzkom; Lincoln Holdzkom; John Lee; Andrew Marck; Riki Paewai; Jamie Wilson; Christen Wise	Catchers: Aaron Campbell; David Skeels; Beau Te Wera Bishop; Infielders: Scott Campbell; Daniel Devonshire; Regan Hoet; Daniel Lamb-Hunt; Boss Moanaroa; Alan Schoenberger; Daniel Tan; Outfielders: Tim Auty; Daniel Bradley; Max Brown; Marko Lezaic; Moko Moanaroa	Manager: Andy Skeels; Coaches: Jay Bell; Steve Kline; Chris Woodward; Darrell Evans; Cola Yeh

== 2017 WBC Qualifiers ==
The Diamondblacks, managed by Chris Woodward—a former Major League infielder and former Manager of the Texas Rangers—beat the Philippines but lost twice to South Africa and were eliminated. Boss Moanaroa led the way in New Zealand's win against the Philippines, going 4 for 5 with two doubles, a home run, and 7 RBI; he added another RBI against South Africa and thereby led the tournament with 8 RBI. His brother Moko led the team with a .500 batting average. Eighteen-year-old Jimmy Boyce was credited with the win against the Philippines. Five of the Diamondblacks were teenagers, including 17-year-old Kyle Glogoski, who also pitched against the Philippines.

=== 2017 WBC Qualifiers Roster ===
New Zealand roster – 2017 World Baseball Classic Qualifier
Players		Coaches
Pitchers: Jimmy Boyce; Ben Cone; Scott Cone; Jacob Curry; Kyle Glogoski; Benjamin Hughlon; Blair Johnstone; John Lee; Andrew Marck; Nick Maronde; Riki Paewai; Ben Thompson; Jamie Wilson; Randy Yard	Catchers: Beau Te Wera Bishop; Dewald De Klerk; Connar O'Gorman; Infielders: Tyron Bartorillo; Scott Campbell; Jason Matthews; Boss Moanaroa; Alan Schoenberger; Outfielders: Tim Auty; Daniel Bradley; Max Brown; Daniel Lamb-Hunt; Moko Moanaroa	Manager: Chris Woodward; Coaches: Ron Roenicke; Josh Bard; Naoyuki Shimizu; Chris Prieto; D.J. Carrasco

== 2021 WBC Qualifiers ==
New Zealand was set to compete in the 2021 World Baseball Classic Qualifiers. The Diamondblacks had named Stephen Mintz as their manager and had selected their roster. But the tournament was cancelled due to the COVID-19 pandemic.

== 2022 WBC Qualifiers ==
New Zealand’s 2022 World Baseball Classic Qualifier campaign in Panama was short-lived but spirited, ending with a 0–2 record and early elimination. The Diamondblacks opened with a 12–7 loss to Brazil, showing offensive firepower with 10 hits and a late rally, but were undone by pitching struggles and defensive miscues. In their do-or-die matchup against Argentina, they held a slim lead until the seventh inning, when walks and hit batters led to a four-run collapse and a 4–1 defeat. Despite standout performances from Matthews, Pouaka-Grego, Brown, M, and Sanders on the mound, New Zealand couldn’t convert key opportunities, leaving runners stranded and falling short in clutch moments. The series highlighted flashes of promise but ultimately underscored the fine margins of tournament baseball.

=== 2022 WBC Qualifiers Roster ===
New Zealand roster – 2023 World Baseball Classic Qualifier
Players		Coaches
Pitchers: 30 Charlie Adamson; 44 Jimmy Boyce; 45 Nao Fukuda; 36 Zaid Flynn; 20 Eugene Gay; 19 Connor Gleeson; 21 Todd Hatcher; 34 Mitchell Hughson; 24 Elliot Johnstone; 2 Ryota Okumoto; 49 Maclain Roberts; 18 Ryan Sanders; 25 Yuuki Takahashi; 23 Ben Thompson	Catchers: 35 Beau Te Wera Bishop; 77 Faenza Bishop; 12 Connar O'Gorman; Infielders: 5 Duncan Izaaks; 7 Sam Kennelly; 27 Chayton Krauss; 1 Ayrton Laird; 15 Daniel Lamb-Hunt; 9 Jason Matthews; 3 Nikau Pouaka-Grego; Outfielders: 11 Max Brown; 89 Andrew Marck; 14 Kris Richards; 6 Kane Swanson	Manager: 13 Scott Campbell; Coaches: 22 Brian Anderson; 40 Darren Bragg; 17 Brian Matusz; 37 Al Quintana; 29 Daniel Tan

== Coaching staff ==
Position	Name
(New Zealand) Dan Tan (Interim)	Manager
(South Korea) John Lee (Interim)	Assistant coach
(New Zealand) Dom Jefferies (Interim)	Assistant coach
(New Zealand) Harrison Lough (Interim)	Bullpen coach
(New Zealand) Adam Lough	Executive Officer

== Current roster ==
New Zealand roster – 2025 NZ Diamondblacks v Melbourne Aces
Players		Coaches
Pitchers: Charlie Adamson; Matt Bradley; Connor Gleeson; Taylor Irwin; Elliot Johnstone; Dakota Parsons; Connor Perry; Ben Sinclair; Yuuki Takahashi; Joseph Yamamoto	Catchers: Mincharm Kim; Henry Leabourn; Flynn Morrison; Infielders: Luke Hansen; Bunji Nakao; Taichi Nakao; Jax Ryan; Hunter Southey; Outfielders: Ben Jager; Andrew Marck; Hiromi Sone; Cooper Wilson	Manager: Dan Tan; Coaches: John Lee; Dom Jefferies; Harrison Lough; Adam Lough

== International tournament results ==
=== World Baseball Classic ===
World Baseball Classic record							Qualification record			
Year	Round	Position	W	L	RS	RA	W	L	RS	RA
2006	did not enter						No qualifiers held			
2009	did not enter						No qualifiers held			
2013	did not qualify						2	2	22	27
2017	did not qualify						1	2	20	23
2023	did not qualify						0	2	8	16
2026	did not enter						did not enter			
Total	-	0/6	-	-	-	-	3	6	50	66
