= Zimbabwe national baseball team =

Information
- Country: Zimbabwe
- Confederation: African Baseball & Softball Association
- Manager: Americo Juma

WBSC ranking
- Current: 57 (26 October 2026)

The Zimbabwe national baseball team is the national baseball team that represents Zimbabwe in international competitions.

== History ==
=== Zimbabwean Baseball (1980–Present) ===
In 1992, the first African Baseball and Softball Association (ABSA) Congress and Africa Cup Baseball Championship was organised in Harare, with four countries competing. In 1995, the 3rd Africa Cup Baseball Championship and ABSA Congress was also held in Harare.

== Tournament record ==
=== Africa Cup Baseball Championship ===
Africa Cup Baseball Championship record
| Year | Host | Position | W | L | RS | RA |
|---|---|---|---|---|---|---|
| 1992 | (Zimbabwe) Harare | 2nd | Unavailable | | | |
| 1993 | (South Africa) Cape Town | Unavailable | Unavailable | | | |
| 1995 | (Zimbabwe) Harare | Unavailable | Unavailable | | | |
| 2001 | (Uganda) Kampala | Unavailable | Unavailable | | | |
| 2019 | (South Africa) Johannesburg | 3rd | 2 | 3 | Unavailable | |
| Total | 4/4 | 2nd | - | - | - | - |

=== All-Africa Games ===
The first time Baseball featured in the All-Africa Games was in 1999 in the 7th All-Africa Games in South Africa and for the second and last time, in 2003, in the 8th All-Africa Games in Nigeria.

All-Africa Games record
| Year | Host | Position | W | L | RS | RA |
|---|---|---|---|---|---|---|
| 1999 | (South Africa) Johannesburg | 3rd | 2 | 3 | 84 | 76 |
| 2003 | (Nigeria) Abuja | 3rd | 3 | 3 | 39 | 24 |
| Total | | 3rd | 5 | 6 | 123 | 100 |

| 9 September; 14:00 | Zimbabwe | 11–12 (F/9) | Nigeria | Randburg Sports Stadium |
| 9 September; 14:00 | LP: Nhauro Mpanguri | Boxscore | WP: Michael Oguwuche | Randburg Sports Stadium |

| 11 September; 12:30 | Zimbabwe | 2–37 (F/6) | South Africa | Randburg Sports Stadium |
| 11 September; 12:30 | LP: Ozias Moyo | Boxscore | WP: Darryn Smith | Randburg Sports Stadium |

| 12 September; 09:00 | Lesotho | 5–31 (F/6) | Zimbabwe | Randburg Sports Stadium |
| 12 September; 09:00 | LP: Teboho Shelile | Boxscore | WP: Nhauro Mpanguri | Randburg Sports Stadium |

| 13 September; 14:00 | Zimbabwe | 10–24 (F/7) | Ghana | Randburg Sports Stadium |
| 13 September; 14:00 | LP: Tinei Billiat | Boxscore | WP: Charles Andam | Randburg Sports Stadium |

| 14 September; 11:00 | Uganda | 1–30 (F/6) | Zimbabwe | Randburg Sports Stadium |
| 14 September; 11:00 | LP: Henry Odong | Boxscore | WP: Nhauro Mpanguri | Randburg Sports Stadium |
