= Baseball at the 2003 All-Africa Games =

2003 All Africa Games Baseball Tournament
Tournament details
- Country: Nigeria
- Dates: 7–14 October 2003
- Teams: 5

Final positions
- Champions: South Africa
- Runners-up: Nigeria
- Third place: Zimbabwe

Tournament statistics
- Games played: 50

The 2003 All Africa Games Baseball Tournament was held in Abuja, Nigeria from 7 to 14 October as part of the program of the 2003 All-Africa Games. It was contested by five national teams: Nigeria, Lesotho, South Africa, Uganda and Zimbabwe; Cameroon was scheduled to participate but withdrew. This was the second and, as of the 2023 edition, last time that baseball was featured in the African Games.

South Africa won the gold medal after defeating hosts Nigeria in the final game 15–0. Zimbabwe claimed the bronze medal after defeating Uganda 17–4 in the third place match. All the games were played at Old Parade Ground.

As African champions, South Africa faced Australia in the Africa–Oceania playoff to determine what team would qualify to the 2004 Summer Olympics. They lost 1–8, 4–6 and 1–13 in the best of five games series against Australia, failing to advance to the Olympics.

== Medalists ==
Event	Gold	Silver	Bronze
Men's baseball	South Africa	Nigeria	Zimbabwe

== First round ==
Pos	Team	Pld	W	L	RF	RA	RD	PCT	GB	Qualification
1	South Africa	4	4	0	45	5	+40	1.000	—	Advance to Knockout stage
2	Nigeria (H)	4	3	1	51	14	+37	.750	1	Advance to Knockout stage
3	Zimbabwe	4	2	2	20	19	+1	.500	2	Advance to Knockout stage
4	Uganda	4	1	3	22	40	−18	.250	3	Advance to Knockout stage
5	Lesotho	4	0	4	14	74	−60	.000	4	

(H) Hosts

7 October 2003; 11:30 (UTC+1)	Uganda	14 – 9	Lesotho	Abuja, Nigeria

7 October 2003; 15:00 (UTC+1)	Zimbabwe	0 – 10	Nigeria	Abuja, Nigeria

8 October 2003; 8:00 (UTC+1)	Nigeria	15 – 4	Uganda	Abuja, Nigeria

8 October 2003; 15:00 (UTC+1)	Zimbabwe	1 – 5	South Africa	Abuja, Nigeria

9 October 2003; 8:00 (UTC+1)	Lesotho	0 – 13	Zimbabwe	Abuja, Nigeria

9 October 2003; 11:30 (UTC+1)	South Africa	6 – 3	Nigeria	Abuja, Nigeria

10 October 2003; 8:00 (UTC+1)	South Africa	24 – 1	Lesotho	Abuja, Nigeria

10 October 2003; 11:30 (UTC+1)	Zimbabwe	6 – 4	Uganda	Abuja, Nigeria

11 October 2003; 11:30 (UTC+1)	Uganda	0 – 10	South Africa	Abuja, Nigeria

11 October 2003; 15:00 (UTC+1)	Nigeria	23 – 4	Lesotho	Abuja, Nigeria

== Knockout stage ==
Semifinals
1	South Africa	7
4	Uganda	1
2	Nigeria	6
3	Zimbabwe	2

Finals
1	South Africa	15
2	Nigeria	0
Third place
4	Uganda	4
3	Zimbabwe	17

== Final standings ==
Pos	Team	W	L
Gold medal	South Africa	6	0
Silver medal	Nigeria	4	2
Bronze medal	Zimbabwe	3	3
4	Uganda	1	5
5	Lesotho	0	4

== Leaders ==
All-Africa Games leaders
Stat	Player
Leading Hitter	(Nigeria) Jimmy Kolanole
Best ERA	(Nigeria) Michael Ogwuche
Most Runs Batted In	(Nigeria) Michael Ogwuche
Most Stolen Bases	(Uganda) Allan Otim
Most Runs Scored	(Nigeria) Jimmy Kolanole
