= Baseball at the 1999 All-Africa Games =

South African Baseball Tournament

Tournament details
- Country: South Africa
- Dates: 9–15 September
- Teams: 6

Final positions
- Champions: South Africa (1st title)
- Runners-up: Nigeria
- Third place: Zimbabwe
- Fourth place: Ghana

Tournament statistics
- Games played: 15
- Best BA: Ian Holness (.909)

Baseball was one of 19 sports included in the 1999 All-Africa Games held during September of that year in Johannesburg, South Africa. It was the first of two editions of the Games during which baseball would be included. Six teams participated in the tournament, with the winner being qualified for a playoff with the champion of Oceania, the winner of which would be then qualified for the 2000 Summer Olympics in Australia.

South Africa dominated the tournament handily, outscoring their opponents by double digits. They went on to the Olympic qualifying playoff against Guam where they similarly were successful, sweeping a best-of-five-series played in Johannesburg in December 1999, earning the team's first and only qualification for Olympic baseball. South African players led most of the statistical categories for the tournament, including the top hitter, Ian Holness, who batted .909 with 10 hits in 11 at-bats.

== Participants ==
- Ghana
- Lesotho
- Nigeria
- South Africa
- Uganda
- Zimbabwe

== Format ==
The tournament was played in a round-robin format, with each team playing all other teams once.

== Results ==
=== Standings ===
	Pos.	Team	W	L	RS	RA
Gold medal	1	South Africa	5	0	158	6
Silver medal	2	Nigeria	4	1	68	39
Bronze medal	3	Zimbabwe	2	3	84	76
	4	Ghana	2	3	93	80
	5	Lesotho	2	3	39	105
	6	Uganda	0	5	13	128

=== Game log ===
9 September; 10:00	South Africa	43–0 (F/5)	Lesotho	Randburg Sports Stadium
9 September; 10:00	WP: Braydon Bartle	Boxscore	LP: Teboho Shelile	Randburg Sports Stadium

9 September; 14:00	Zimbabwe	11–12 (F/9)	Nigeria	Randburg Sports Stadium
9 September; 14:00	LP: Nhauro Mpanguri	Boxscore	WP: Michael Oguwuche	Randburg Sports Stadium

11 September; 09:00	Lesotho	18–14 (F/6)	Ghana	Randburg Sports Stadium
11 September; 09:00	WP: Justice Tsuniyane	Boxscore	LP: Joshua Amponsah	Randburg Sports Stadium

11 September; 12:30	Zimbabwe	2–37 (F/6)	South Africa	Randburg Sports Stadium
11 September; 12:30	LP: Ozias Moyo	Boxscore	WP: Darryn Smith	Randburg Sports Stadium

11 September; 16:00	Uganda	1–27 (F/5)	Nigeria	Randburg Sports Stadium
11 September; 16:00	LP: Henry Odong	Boxscore	WP: Augustine Gabriel	Randburg Sports Stadium

12 September; 09:00	Lesotho	5–31 (F/6)	Zimbabwe	Randburg Sports Stadium
12 September; 09:00	LP: Teboho Shelile	Boxscore	WP: Nhauro Mpanguri	Randburg Sports Stadium

12 September; 12:30	Nigeria	1–19 (F/7)	South Africa	Randburg Sports Stadium
12 September; 12:30	LP: Ceaser Ofoedu	Boxscore	WP: Carl Michaels	Randburg Sports Stadium

12 September; 16:00	Ghana	27–6 (F/5)	Uganda	Randburg Sports Stadium
12 September; 16:00	WP: Ishmael Abayaa	Boxscore	LP: Henry Odong	Randburg Sports Stadium

13 September; 09:00	South Africa	31–0 (F/7)	Uganda	Randburg Sports Stadium
13 September; 09:00	WP: Vaughn Beariman	Boxscore	LP: Rockfeller Erima	Randburg Sports Stadium

13 September; 12:30	Nigeria	14–3 (F/8)	Lesotho	Randburg Sports Stadium
13 September; 12:30	WP: Emmanuel Motoni	Boxscore	LP: Bahzakoana Shelike	Randburg Sports Stadium

13 September; 14:00	Zimbabwe	10–24 (F/7)	Ghana	Randburg Sports Stadium
13 September; 14:00	LP: Tinei Billiat	Boxscore	WP: Charles Andam	Randburg Sports Stadium

14 September; 11:00	Uganda	1–30 (F/6)	Zimbabwe	Randburg Sports Stadium
14 September; 11:00	LP: Henry Odong	Boxscore	WP: Nhauro Mpanguri	Randburg Sports Stadium

14 September; 15:00	Ghana	3–28 (F/5)	South Africa	Randburg Sports Stadium
14 September; 15:00	LP: Mohammed Sherrif	Boxscore	WP: Wesley Botha	Randburg Sports Stadium

15 September; 11:00	Uganda	3–13 (F/7)	Lesotho	Randburg Sports Stadium
15 September; 11:00	LP: Rockfeller Erima	Boxscore	WP: Justice Tsuniyane	Randburg Sports Stadium

15 September; 15:00	Ghana	5–14 (F/7)	Nigeria	Randburg Sports Stadium
15 September; 15:00	LP: Charles Andam	Boxscore	WP: Emmanuel Motoni	Randburg Sports Stadium
