= Nigeria national baseball team =

Information
- Country: Nigeria
- Federation: Nigeria Baseball & Softball Association
- Confederation: African Baseball & Softball Association

WBSC ranking
- Current: NR (26 March 2026)

The Nigeria national baseball team is the national baseball team of Nigeria. The team represents Nigeria in international competitions and is ranked 6th in Africa (2020 ranking release), down from 2nd in Africa. And ranking number 70 in the world standing (2020 ranking release)

== Tournament record ==
=== All-Africa Games ===
All-Africa Games record
Year	Host	Position	W	L	RS	RA
1999	South Africa	2nd	4	1	68	39
2003	Nigeria	2nd	4	2	57	31
Total	2/2	–	8	3	125	70

In 1999 Nigeria won the silver medal by defeating every other national team except South Africa, to whom they lost in the final. In order, Nigeria won against Lesotho (14–3), Zimbabwe (12–11), Uganda (27–1) and Ghana (14–5) until a blowout loss to South Africa (1–19) in the championship game. Nigeria was again a dominant power in the 2003 Games held in Abuja, cruising to the final where they lost to South Africa 0–15 to earn the silver medal again. Baseball was scheduled to make a return to the All-Africa Games in Mozambique in 2011, but this did not occur as planned.

1999 All-Africa Games

9 September; 14:00	Zimbabwe	11–12 (F/9)	Nigeria	Randburg Sports Stadium
9 September; 14:00	LP: Nhauro Mpanguri	Boxscore	WP: Michael Oguwuche	Randburg Sports Stadium

11 September; 16:00	Uganda	1–27 (F/5)	Nigeria	Randburg Sports Stadium
11 September; 16:00	LP: Henry Odong	Boxscore	WP: Augustine Gabriel	Randburg Sports Stadium

12 September; 12:30	Nigeria	1–19 (F/7)	South Africa	Randburg Sports Stadium
12 September; 12:30	LP: Ceaser Ofoedu	Boxscore	WP: Carl Michaels	Randburg Sports Stadium

13 September; 12:30	Nigeria	14–3 (F/8)	Lesotho	Randburg Sports Stadium
13 September; 12:30	WP: Emmanuel Motoni	Boxscore	LP: Bahzakoana Shelike	Randburg Sports Stadium

15 September; 15:00	Ghana	5–14 (F/7)	Nigeria	Randburg Sports Stadium
15 September; 15:00	LP: Charles Andam	Boxscore	WP: Emmanuel Motoni	Randburg Sports Stadium

== Players ==
- Victor Achakpo
- Adedeji Adekunle
- Adeyinaka Adewusi
- Akeem Adeyemi
- Godwin Agobie
- Toba Elegbi
- Olakunle Damilare Aina
- Olawale Jimi Kolawole
- Emmanuel Motoni
- Ceaser Ofoedu
- Michael Oguwuche
- Michael Okoli
- Wande Olabisi
- Emmanuel Oladinni
- Godfrey Nwanekah
- Gbenga Olayemi
- Joseph Olayemi
- Victor Owoyokun
- Igho Ruona Brown
- Sunday Twaki

== Uniforms ==
Home
