= South Africa national baseball team =

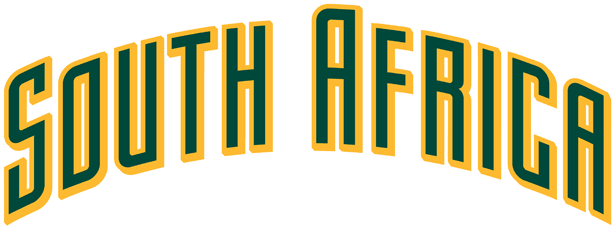

Information
- Country: South Africa
- Federation: South African Baseball Union
- Confederation: African Baseball & Softball Association
- Manager: Andy Berglund

WBSC ranking
- Current: 24 (26 October 2026)
- Highest: 22 (June 2021)
- Lowest: 39 (December 2014)

Olympic Games
- Appearances: 1 (first in 2000)
- Best result: 8th

World Baseball Classic
- Appearances: 2 (first in 2006)
- Best result: 16th (2 times, most recent in 2009)

World Cup
- Appearances: 5 (first in 1998)
- Best result: 14th (1 time, in 2001)

All-Africa Games
- Appearances: 2 (first in 1999)
- Best result: (gold) 1st (2 times, most recent in 2003)

The South African national baseball team is the baseball team which represents the Republic of South Africa in international baseball competitions such as the World Baseball Classic and the Summer Olympics. The governing body of the team is the South African Baseball Union.

== History ==
On 5 July 1931, the first inter-provincial match was played between the only two provincial teams, Transvaal and Natal, in front of a crowd of 4,000 spectators. Included in the match was Springbok cricketer Buster Nupen (Transvaal), Springbok rugby player Bill Payn (Natal) and Springbok footballer George Brunton. Springbok All-Star teams would later be based on the best of several provinces, with Transvaal, Natal, and Western Province dominating.

In 1933, the clash between Natal and Transvaal included Nupen and Brunton, as well as Olympic gold medal hurdler Sid Atkinson(Natal), Springbok cricketers Charlie Cawse(Transvaal), Louis Duffus(Transvaal), Eric Dalton(Natal), Syd Curnow(Transvaal) and Springbok cricket captain Jock Cameron (Transvaal). In 1934, the match between Natal and Western Province featured Springbok rugby player Gerry Brand (Western Province).

The South African Baseball Federation was founded in 1935, with five provincial associations including Transvaal, Natal (founded 1931), Western Province (founded 1932), Eastern Province (founded 1934), and Border.

The first South African All-Star team appears to be formed on 19 November 1938, when an 'All Africa team' made up of the 'combined provinces' played a US Navy team from the USS Boise. South African cricketer Dudley Nourse featured for Natal a few days later, and was noted as winning 'admiration of the visitors'. Nourse would later go on to captain and manage the South African cricket team as well as later holding Springbok records for test appearances and batting average. When he was named Wisden Cricketer of the Year in 1948, the Press Association reported Nourse 'became one of his country's leading baseball experts'. The score is recorded as 18–3 to US Navy.

In Cape Town, on 17 November 1945, a South African exhibition team made up of players from the Transvaal, Natal, Eastern, and Western Province provinces took on a US Navy team from the USS Tennessee and USS California battleships. 'Nearly 20,000 cheering fans witnessed the principal game, which the ships’ company was hard pressed to win by two tallies (six to four)'.

In Johannesburg, on 19 March 1950, the Australian cricket team ended their tour with a baseball match against a combined South African baseball team, in front of a reported record crowd of 12,000.

=== The American All-Stars (1955–56) ===
During a visit to Battle Creek, Michigan, in the United States in July 1955, the chairman of the South African Baseball Board met with the President of American Baseball Congress to finalise arrangements for celebrating baseball's 50th year in South Africa. The three-month and unbeaten 33 game tour began on 14 November 1955, finishing in February 1956.

The "semi-pro level" American all-star team was managed by New York Yankees scout Terry Bartron and included Brooklyn Dodgers' Hall of Famer and World Series runner up (1953) Don Thompson, and Dick Stuart who went on to become World Series champion (1960), a two-time MLB All-Star player (1961), and the first first baseman in major league history to record three assists in one inning (1963).

Seven of the 33 games were against the first-ever official South African All-Star "test" team, which included Northern and Southern Rhodesia.

=== Modern era ===
The national team appeared in their first and only Olympic tournament in the 2000 Olympics. South Africa gained entry into the tournament by beating Guam 3–0 in a best-of-five Africa/Oceania playoff series. The team finished with a record of 1–6, with their only win against the Netherlands.

The win against the Netherlands was thanks largely to two key players. Tim Harrell pitched all 10 innings in the game, giving up just two unearned runs on five walks and six hits, with four strikeouts. Right fielder Ian Holness drove in all three of South Africa's runs. He hit a solo home run in the 6th inning against Dutch starter Patrick de Lange, followed by an RBI double off reliever Radhames Dykhoff. He finished off the run scoring by hitting another solo home run in the 10th inning, off Dutch closer Rikkert Faneyte.

=== World Baseball Classic appearances (2006–2009) ===
South Africa's inclusion in the WBC was considered rather surprising by many observers. No South African player reached Major League Baseball (MLB) until Gift Ngoepe did so with the Pittsburgh Pirates on 27 April 2017. The team was managed by Rick Magnante, with then-MLB career saves leader Lee Smith as a coach.

In the team's first game, South Africa nearly upset Canada, a team consisting of mostly MLB players. South Africa took an 8–7 lead into the ninth inning before falling 11–8. This would be as close as the team would get to winning a game. The South Africans lost the next two games to Mexico 10–4, and to the United States in a mercy rule-shortened 17–0 rout.

==== 2009 ====
South Africa competed at the 2009 World Baseball Classic in Group B with Mexico, Cuba, and Australia.

In their first game, South Africa was overpowered by international powerhouse Cuba, giving up 6 home runs in an 8–1 loss. The South African defence was a bright point in the match however, turning three double plays and 2 pickoffs.

In the group elimination match, South Africa lost heavily to hosts Mexico 14–3. Although the South Africans kept it a one-run game heading into the 7th inning, the Mexican team pounced on the inexperienced bullpen pitchers that entered the game late on and scored 11 runs in the final three innings.

South Africa finished the WBC with an 0–2 record, with 4 runs scored and 22 conceded.

=== WBC and Olympic qualifiers (2012–present) ===
Four qualifying tournaments were scheduled in 2012 for the 2013 WBC, with one team advancing from each to join the 12 squads that had qualified previously by winning at least one game in the 2009 WBC. Each of the pools included one team with previous experience in the WBC, but which failed to win a single game during the 2009 tournament. South Africa was placed in Qualifier 1 with Spain, France, and Israel at Roger Dean Stadium in Jupiter, Florida.

South Africa lost the first game of this double-elimination tournament to dark horse Israel, 7–3. They moved into the loser's bracket where they eliminated France, 5–2 in 11 innings, after Paul Bell hit a 2-run double into left field in the top of the 11th. In the loser's bracket final, South Africa fell to eventual WBC qualifier Spain, 13–3, and was eliminated from the tournament. Minnesota Twins prospect, Hein Robb pitched 5 1/3 innings in 2 relief appearances, giving up 0 runs while striking out 4 batters during the qualifying tournament.

South Africa returned to qualifiers for the 2017 WBC, losing to Australia in a match to qualify for the main tournament.

South Africa won the 2019 African Baseball Championship, going undefeated, to qualify for the Africa/Europe 2020 Olympic Qualification tournament in September 2019. Among those who played for the team were Bradley Erasmus, Anthony Phillips, Darryn Smith, and Dylan Unsworth.

South Africa lost to Spain and Germany in a 2022 qualification tournament for the 2023 WBC in Regensburg, Germany. South Africa lost all three pool games in its qualifier for the 2026 WBC.

== Current roster ==
South Africa roster – 2026 World Baseball Classic Qualification
Players		Coaches
Pitchers: 26 Vince Michael Deyzel; 24 Rowan Ebersohn; 27 Jared Elario; 22 Justin Erasmus; 12 Dean Jacobs; 35 Damon King; 54 Daniel Mendelsohn; 13 Damian Perkins; 48 Anthony Sayers; 1 Brandon Smith; 7 Lloyd Stevens; 18 Josh Tribe; 50 Dylan Unsworth; 3 Jaryd White	Catchers: 31 Dayle Feldtman; 10 Tyrone Milne; 34 Luke November; Infielders: Mathew Diedricks; 24 Nicholas Eagles; 9 Victor Ngoepe; 5 Josh November; 23 Anthony Phillips; 14 Jonathan Phillips; 2 Tyler Smith; Outfielders: 21 Chris Beyers; 21 Brandon Bouillon; 20 Jason Carelse; 11 Brandon Edmunds; 29 Joshua Wentzel	Manager: 16 Neil Adonis; Coaches: 32 Gavin Bennett; 40 Jody Birch; 8 Dean McKinon; 25 Darryn Smith; 15 Paul van der Merwe

== Results and fixtures ==
The following is a list of professional baseball match results currently active in the latest version of the WBSC World Rankings, as well as any future matches that have been scheduled.

Legend

Win Lose Void or postponed Fixture

=== 2025 ===
2026 World Baseball Classic Q	February 21	South Africa	1–2 (F/10)	Nicaragua	Taipei Dome, Taiwan
2026 World Baseball Classic Q	12:00 UTC+8	LP: Dean Jacobs	Boxscore	WP: Bryan Torres

2026 World Baseball Classic Q	February 22	Chinese Taipei	9–1	South Africa	Taipei Dome, Taiwan
2026 World Baseball Classic Q	19:00 UTC+8	WP: Sha Tzu-chen; HR: Sung Cheng-jui (1), Lee Tsung-hsien (1)	Boxscore	LP: Damon King	Attendance: 35,868

2026 World Baseball Classic Q	February 23	South Africa	1–9	Spain	Taipei Dome, Taiwan
2026 World Baseball Classic Q	12:00 UTC+8	LP: Vince Deyzel	Boxscore	WP: Pablo Guillén; HR: Rusber Estrada (1), Jesús Ustariz (1)

=== 2022 ===
World Baseball Classic Q	September 16	South Africa	4–5	Spain	Armin-Wolf-Arena, Germany
World Baseball Classic Q	13:00 CET	LP: Jared Elario	Boxscore	WP: Vicente Campos; Sv: Rhiner Cruz; HR: Justin Connell (1)	Umpires: Roberto LaMadrid

World Baseball Classic Q	September 19	South Africa	5–11	Germany	Armin-Wolf-Arena, Germany
World Baseball Classic Q	12:00 CET	LP: Kevin Townend (0-1); HR: Dayle Feldtman (1)	Boxscore	WP: Nick Wittgren (1-0); Sv: Sascha Koch (1); HR: William Germaine (1), Demetrius Moorer (1, 2)	Attendance: 920; Umpires: Sam Burch (HP), Tyler Jones (1B), Young Chou Kwon (2B), Kyohei Makita (3B)

=== 2019 ===
African Championship GS	May 1	South Africa	18–0	Uganda	Johannesburg, South Africa

African Championship GS	May 2	Burkina Faso	3–18	South Africa	Johannesburg, South Africa

African Championship GS	May 3	South Africa	16–1	Zimbabwe	Johannesburg, South Africa

African Championship SF	May 4	Burkina Faso	5–16	South Africa	Johannesburg, South Africa

African Championship F	May 5	Uganda	0–27	South Africa	Johannesburg, South Africa

=== 2018 ===
Friendly	November 3	France	13–24	South Africa	Boksburg, South Africa
Friendly			Boxscore

Friendly	November 4	France	8–14	South Africa	Boksburg, South Africa
Friendly			Boxscore

Friendly	November 7	France	11–9	South Africa	Durban, South Africa
Friendly			Boxscore

Friendly	November 8	France	5–4	South Africa	Durban, South Africa
Friendly			Boxscore

Friendly	November 9	France	1–7	South Africa	Cape Town, South Africa
Friendly			Boxscore

Friendly	November 10	France	1–13	South Africa	Cape Town, South Africa
Friendly			Boxscore

Friendly	November 11	France	4–11	South Africa	Cape Town, South Africa
Friendly			Boxscore

== Tournament record ==
=== World Baseball Classic ===
World Baseball Classic record							Qualification record			
Year	Round	Position	W	L	RS	RA	W	L	RS	RA
(United States) 2006	Round 1	16th	0	3	12	38	No qualifiers held			
(Mexico) 2009	Round 1	16th	0	2	4	22	No qualifiers held			
2013	did not qualify						1	2	11	22
2017	did not qualify						2	2	22	19
2023	did not qualify						0	2	9	16
2026	did not qualify						0	3	3	20
Total	Round 1	2/6	0	5	16	60	3	9	45	77

=== Olympic Games ===
Summer Olympics record								Qualification
Year	Host	Round	Position	W	L	RS	RA	Qualification
2000	Australia	Preliminary	8th	1	6	11	73	1999 All-Africa Games; Defeated Guam in Africa versus Oceania Playoff
2004	did not qualify							Lost qualification match to Australia
2008	did not qualify							Lost in Final Qualifying Tournament
2020	did not qualify							Lost in Africa/Europe 2020 Olympic Qualification tournament
Total	1/5			1	6	11	73	

=== All-Africa Games ===
All-Africa Games record
Year	Host	Position	W	L	RS	RA
1999	South Africa	1st	5	0	158	6
2003	Nigeria	1st	6	0	67	6
Total	2/2		11	0	225	12

South Africa was the host of the All-Africa Games in 1999. South Africa won the gold medal with ease, by defeating all of the other national teams. In order of margin of victory, South Africa won against Lesotho (43–0) with Ian Holness hitting 4 home runs and 14 RBIs, Zimbabwe (37–2), Nigeria (19–1), Uganda (31–0) and Ghana (28–3). South Africa was again the dominant power in the 2003 Games held in Abuja, cruising to the final where they beat Nigeria 15–0 to win Gold.

1999 All-Africa Games

9 September; 10:00	South Africa	43–0 (F/5)	Lesotho	Randburg Sports Stadium
9 September; 10:00	WP: Braydon Bartle	Boxscore	LP: Teboho Shelile	Randburg Sports Stadium

11 September; 12:30	Zimbabwe	2–37 (F/6)	South Africa	Randburg Sports Stadium
11 September; 12:30	LP: Ozias Moyo	Boxscore	WP: Darryn Smith	Randburg Sports Stadium

12 September; 12:30	Nigeria	1–19 (F/7)	South Africa	Randburg Sports Stadium
12 September; 12:30	LP: Ceaser Ofoedu	Boxscore	WP: Carl Michaels	Randburg Sports Stadium

13 September; 09:00	South Africa	31–0 (F/7)	Uganda	Randburg Sports Stadium
13 September; 09:00	WP: Vaughn Beariman	Boxscore	LP: Rockfeller Erima	Randburg Sports Stadium

14 September; 15:00	Ghana	3–28 (F/5)	South Africa	Randburg Sports Stadium
14 September; 15:00	LP: Mohammed Sherrif	Boxscore	WP: Wesley Botha	Randburg Sports Stadium
