= Baseball at the SEA Games =

Baseball has not traditionally been played at the Southeast Asian Games, but a baseball tournament was held at the 2005 and 2007 games, then again in 2011 and 2019.

Efforts to introduce baseball to the games began as early as the 1997 SEA Games as a demonstration sport. However it was scrapped due to financial reasons.

Baseball5 debut in the 2025 edition.

== Results ==
=== Men's baseball ===
Year	Hosts	Gold Medal Game			Bronze Medal Game		
Year	Hosts	Gold	Score	Silver	Bronze	Score	Fourth Place
2005; Details	(Philippines); Manila	Philippines	11–0	Thailand	Indonesia	3–2	Myanmar
2007; Details	(Thailand); Pathum Thani	Thailand	no playoffs	Philippines	Indonesia	no playoffs	Myanmar
2011; Details	(Indonesia); Palembang	Philippines	2–0	Indonesia	Thailand	12–4	Vietnam
2019; Details	(Philippines); Mabalacat	Philippines	15–2	Thailand	Indonesia	10–4	Singapore
2025; Details	(Thailand); Pathum Thani	Philippines	5–3	Thailand	Indonesia	10–9	Singapore

=== Baseball5 (mixed) ===
Year	Hosts	Gold Medal Game			Bronze Medal Game		
Year	Hosts	Gold	Score	Silver	Bronze	Score	Fourth Place
2025; Details	(Thailand); Pathum Thani	Thailand	13–10	Indonesia	Malaysia	13–3	Vietnam

== Medal summary ==
As of 2025

Rank	Nation	Gold	Silver	Bronze	Total
1	Philippines	4	1	0	5
2	Thailand	2	3	1	6
3	Indonesia	0	2	4	6
4	Malaysia	0	0	1	1
Totals (4 entries)		6	6	6	18

== Participating nations ==
=== Men's baseball ===
Team	(Philippines) 2005	(Thailand) 2007	(Indonesia) 2011	(Philippines) 2019	(Thailand) 2025	Years
Cambodia		6th		5th		2
Indonesia	3rd	3rd	2nd	3rd	3rd	5
Laos					5th	1
Malaysia	5th	5th	5th		7th	4
Myanmar	4th	4th				2
Philippines	1st	2nd	1st	1st	1st	5
Singapore				4th	4th	2
Thailand	2nd	1st	3rd	2nd	2nd	5
Vietnam			4th		6th	2
Number of teams	5	6	5	5	7	

=== Baseball5 ===
Team	(Thailand) 2025	Years
Indonesia	2nd	1
Malaysia	3rd	1
Thailand	1st	1
Vietnam	4th	1
Number of teams	4	

== See also ==
- Baseball at the Asian Games
