= 2009 Asian Baseball Cup =

Tournament details
- Country: Thailand
- City: Bangkok
- Teams: 8

The 2009 Asian Baseball Cup was hosted in Bangkok, Thailand.

The Philippines was supposed to host the tournament but withdrew due to funding issues.

The tournament was won by Indonesia in the final against Pakistan. Indonesia as champions also qualified for the 2009 Asian Baseball Championship.

== Teams ==
=== Group A ===
- Thailand
- Pakistan
- Sri Lanka
- Malaysia

=== Group B ===
- Hong Kong
- Indonesia
- Myanmar
- Cambodia

== Preliminary round ==
=== May 25 ===
| Team 1 | Score | Team 2 |
|---|---|---|
| Indonesia | 6 - 0 | Cambodia |
| Hong Kong | 11 - 1 | Myanmar |
| Sri Lanka | 3 - 1 | Thailand |
| Pakistan | 20 - 0 (5) | Malaysia |

=== May 26 ===
| Team 1 | Score | Team 2 |
|---|---|---|
| Pakistan | 10 - 0 | Sri Lanka |
| Thailand | 16 - 0 (5) | Malaysia |
| Indonesia | 11 - 1 | Myanmar |
| Hong Kong | 10 - 0 | Cambodia |

=== May 27 ===
| Team 1 | Score | Team 2 |
|---|---|---|
| Indonesia | 7 - 2 | Hong Kong |
| Myanmar | 3 - 1 | Cambodia |
| Pakistan | 9 - 4 | Thailand |
| Sri Lanka | 9 - 1 | Malaysia |

== Semi-finals ==
| Team 1 | Score | Team 2 |
|---|---|---|
| Pakistan | 7 - 2 | Hong Kong |
| Indonesia | 7 - 4 | Sri Lanka |
| Thailand | 5 - 0 | Myanmar |
| Cambodia | 20 - 8 | Malaysia |

== Finals ==
| Team 1 | Score | Team 2 | Type |
|---|---|---|---|
| Sri Lanka | 6 - 5 | Hong Kong | 3rd Place Game |
| Indonesia | 3 - 2 | Pakistan | Championship |
