= Vietnam national baseball team =

National baseball team of Vietnam

Vietnam national naseball team
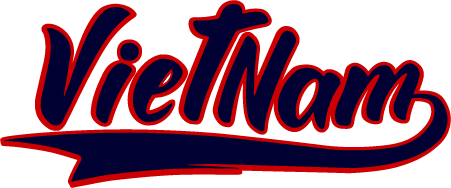

Information
- Country: Vietnam
- Federation: Vietnam Baseball Softball Federation
- Confederation: WBSC Asia
- Manager: Yoo Jae-ho

WBSC ranking
- Current: 71 (18 November 2026)

Uniforms
Home	Road

The Vietnam national baseball team (Vietnamese: Đội tuyển bóng chày nam quốc gia Việt Nam) also referred to as "Lotus Sluggers" is the national baseball team of Vietnam. The team represents Vietnam in international competitions.

== History ==
Up until the founding of the Vietnam Baseball and Softball Federation (VBSF) in 2021, there had been several teams representing Vietnam in international competitions.

Most notable among these was the team competing in the 2011 Southeast Asian Games, whose roster consisted of athletes from the Hochiminh City Sports University. The team finished 4th in the preliminary round with a record of 1 - 3, with the sole win against Malaysia having them qualified to the bronze medal game. The team proceeded to lose to Thailand, finishing the tournament at 4th place.

After the founding of VBSF and establishment of domestic competition, the Vietnam national team was assembled for the first time for the 2023 DGB Indochina Dream League tournament held in Laos. The team finished 4th in the competition, losing all 3 games.

At the 2025 Southeast Asian Games, the Vietnam national was competed with a 22 man roster under general manager Park Hyo-chul. Vietnam finished 6th out of 7 teams with a record of 1 - 5, beating Malaysia for their sole win.

After Park finished his tenure in early 2026, the VBSF appointed former LG Twins prospect Yu Jae-ho as the new national team manager, whose first tournaments are set to be the 2026 Dream Cup in Laos, and the 2026 East Asia Baseball Cup in the Philippines.

== Current roster ==
Vietnam roster – 2026 Dream Cup
Players		Coaches
Pitchers: Dang Vu Trung; Dang Dinh Bao; Duong Nam Anh; Nguyen Phuc An; Nguyen Ngoc Lanh; Pham Manh Chien; Luong Tan Hoang Duy; Truong Quang Thai	Catchers: Pham Le Hieu; Nguyen Huu Hai; Infielders: Nguyen Ngoc Bao; Nguyen Dinh Huy; Tran Ngoc Tu; Tran Huy Hung; Ngo Chi Hao; Outfielders: Dang The Phong; Nguyen Huu Hung; Hoang Cong Minh; Hoang Tien Cao; Phan Sy Nguyen	Manager: Yoo Jae-ho; Coaches: Park Sang-ho

== Recent fixtures ==
=== 2025 ===
SEA Games RR	5 December 2025	Thailand	16–0 (F/5)	Vietnam	Sirikit Main Baseball Stadium, Pathum Thani
SEA Games RR	14:00 (UTC+7)		Boxscore

SEA Games RR	6 December 2025	Malaysia	2–5	Vietnam	Sirikit Secondary Baseball Stadium, Pathum Thani
SEA Games RR	10:00 (UTC+7)		Boxscore

SEA Games RR	7 December 2025	Laos	16–0 (F/6)	Vietnam	Sirikit Secondary Baseball Stadium, Pathum Thani
SEA Games RR	10:00 (UTC+7)		Boxscore

SEA Games RR	8 December 2025	Singapore	19–12	Vietnam	Sirikit Secondary Baseball Stadium, Pathum Thani
SEA Games RR	10:00 (UTC+7)		Boxscore

SEA Games RR	9 December 2025	Vietnam	1–21 (F/7)	Philippines	Sirikit Main Baseball Stadium, Pathum Thani
SEA Games RR	9:30 (UTC+7)		Boxscore

SEA Games RR	10 December 2025	Indonesia	19–3 (F/5)	Vietnam	Sirikit Secondary Baseball Stadium, Pathum Thani
SEA Games RR	10:00 (UTC+7)		Boxscore

=== 2026 ===
Dream Cup RR	8 October 2026	Laos	6–7	Vietnam	Laos Baseball Stadium, Vientiane
Dream Cup RR	10:00 (UTC+7)

Dream Cup RR	9 October 2026	Vietnam	16–6 (F/6)	Mongolia	Laos Baseball Stadium, Vientiane
Dream Cup RR	9:00 (UTC+7)

Dream Cup RR	9 October 2026	Vietnam	2-16	Laos	Laos Baseball Stadium, Vientiane
Dream Cup RR	14:00 (UTC+7)

Dream Cup RR	10 October 2026	Mongolia	0-15 (F/5)	Vietnam	Laos Baseball Stadium, Vientiane
Dream Cup RR	9:00 (UTC+7)

== Competition results ==
=== SEA Games ===
SEA Games record
Year	Result	Pos	Pld	W	L	RS	RA
(Philippines) 2005	did not participate						
(Thailand) 2007	did not participate						
(Indonesia) 2011		4th	5	1	4	4	50
(Philippines) 2019	did not participate						
(Thailand) 2025		6th	6	1	5	18	74
Total	0 Titles	2/5	11	2	9	22	124

=== Other tournaments and events ===
Dream League/ Dream Cup

Refers to the event held by the Laos Baseball Federation under different names

- 2023: 4th out of 4
- 2026: (silver) Runner-up
