= 2009 Asian Baseball Championship =

Tournament details
- Country: Japan
- Dates: 27 July - 3 August
- Teams: 7
- Defending champions: Japan

Final positions
- Champions: Japan (16th title)
- Runners-up: Chinese Taipei
- Third place: South Korea
- Fourth place: China

Tournament statistics
- Best BA: (Japan) Kiyota Ikuhiro
- Most HRs: (Chinese Taipei) Wu Chung Cun
- Best ERA: (Chinese Taipei) Liao Wen Yang
- Most Ks (as pitcher): (Japan) Nomura Yusuke

Awards
- MVP: (Japan) Kiyota Ikuhiro

The 2009 Asian Baseball Championship is an international baseball competition that was held in Sapporo, Japan from July 27 to August 3, 2009. It was the 25th edition of the tournament and featured teams from China, Chinese Taipei, Indonesia, Japan, Philippines, South Korea, and Thailand.

== Qualification Tournament ==
Eight teams were featured in the qualifying tournament from May 25–30, 2009. In the end Indonesia advanced as the winning team to the B level competition in Narita, Japan.

=== Pool A ===
==== Standings ====
Qualified for the semi-finals
Did not qualify for the semi-finals

#	Team	Games	Wins	Losses
1	Pakistan	3	3	0
2	Sri Lanka	3	2	1
3	Thailand	3	1	2
4	Malaysia	3	0	3

==== Game Results ====
May 25, 2009	Sri Lanka	3 – 1	Thailand	Bangkok, Thailand

May 25, 2009	Pakistan	20 – 0 (F/5)	Malaysia	Bangkok, Thailand

May 26, 2009	Pakistan	10 – 0	Sri Lanka	Bangkok, Thailand

May 26, 2009	Thailand	16 – 0 (F/5)	Malaysia	Bangkok, Thailand

May 27, 2009	Pakistan	9 – 4	Thailand	Bangkok, Thailand

May 27, 2009	Sri Lanka	9 – 1	Malaysia	Bangkok, Thailand

=== Pool B ===
==== Standings ====
Qualified for the semi-finals
Did not qualify for the semi-finals

#	Team	Games	Wins	Losses
1	Indonesia	3	3	0
2	Hong Kong	3	2	1
3	Myanmar	3	1	2
4	Cambodia	3	0	3

==== Game Results ====
May 25, 2009	Indonesia	6 – 0	Cambodia	Bangkok, Thailand

May 25, 2009	Hong Kong	11 – 1	Myanmar	Bangkok, Thailand

May 26, 2009	Indonesia	11 – 1	Myanmar	Bangkok, Thailand

May 26, 2009	Hong Kong	10 – 0	Cambodia	Bangkok, Thailand

May 27, 2009	Indonesia	7 – 2	Hong Kong	Bangkok, Thailand

May 27, 2009	Myanmar	3 – 1	Cambodia	Bangkok, Thailand

=== Final round ===
==== Semi finals ====
May 29, 2009	Pakistan	7 – 2	Hong Kong	Bangkok, Thailand

May 29, 2009	Indonesia	7 – 4	Sri Lanka	Bangkok, Thailand

==== 7th place ====
May 29, 2009	Cambodia	20 – 8	Malaysia	Bangkok, Thailand

==== 5th place ====
May 29, 2009	Thailand	5 – 0	Myanmar	Bangkok, Thailand

==== 3rd place ====
May 30, 2009	Sri Lanka	6 – 5	Hong Kong	Bangkok, Thailand

=== Final ===
May 30, 2009	Indonesia	3 – 2	Pakistan	Bangkok, Thailand

== Narita Round ==
=== Standings ===
Qualified for the semi-finals
Did not qualify for the semi-finals

#	Team	Games	Wins	Losses
1	Japan	3	3	0
2	Philippines	3	2	1
3	Thailand	3	1	2
4	Indonesia	3	0	3

=== Game Results ===
July 27, 2009	Japan	12 – 0 (F/7)	Philippines	Narita, Japan

July 27, 2009	Thailand	6 – 1	Indonesia	Narita, Japan

July 28, 2009	Thailand	0 – 12 (F/7)	Japan	Narita, Japan

July 28, 2009	Indonesia	1 – 6	Philippines	Narita, Japan

July 29, 2009	Indonesia	0 – 13 (F/7)	Japan	Narita, Japan

July 29, 2009	Philippines	8 – 0	Thailand	Narita, Japan

== Final round ==
=== Standings ===
#	Team	Games	Wins	Losses
1	Japan	3	3	0
2	Chinese Taipei	3	2	1
3	South Korea	3	1	2
4	China	3	0	3

=== Game Results ===
August 1, 2009	South Korea	4 – 5	Chinese Taipei	Maruyama Stadium, Sapporo, Japan

August 1, 2009	China	0 – 4	Japan	Maruyama Stadium, Sapporo, Japan

August 2, 2009	China	1 – 8	South Korea	Maruyama Stadium, Sapporo, Japan

August 2, 2009	Chinese Taipei	5 – 6	Japan	Maruyama Stadium, Sapporo, Japan

August 3, 2009	Chinese Taipei	13 – 1 (F/7)	China	Maruyama Stadium, Sapporo, Japan

August 3, 2009	Japan	7 – 1	South Korea	Maruyama Stadium, Sapporo, Japan

== Final standings ==
Rk	Team
1	Japan
2	Chinese Taipei
3	South Korea
4	China
Failed to qualify for the Second Round
5	Philippines
6	Thailand
7	Indonesia
