= 2018 East Asia Baseball Cup =

- Event logo

Tournament details
- Country: Hong Kong
- Dates: June 24 – 28
- Teams: 5

Final positions
- Champions: Philippines (3rd title)
- Runners-up: Thailand
- Third place: Hong Kong
- Fourth place: Indonesia

The 2018 East Asia Baseball Cup is the 12th edition of the tournament, held from June 24 to 28, 2023 in Hong Kong.

The East Asia Cup, last held in 2015, returns after the 2017 edition was cancelled due to the lack of a suitable host.

The Philippines won the tournament, earning a berth in the 2019 Asian Baseball Championship

== Round robin ==
Pos	Team	Pld	W	L	RF	RA	PCT	GB
1	Philippines (C)	4	4	0	34	14	1.000	—
2	Thailand	4	3	1	41	19	.750	1
3	Hong Kong (H)	4	2	2	35	20	.500	2
4	Indonesia	4	1	3	20	27	.250	3
5	Singapore	4	0	4	4	54	.000	4

Source: BFA and Scoreboard
(C) Champions; (H) Hosts

June 24; 10:00	Singapore	2–14	Hong Kong	Sai Tso Wan Recreation Ground, Kowloon
June 24; 10:00		Boxscore		Sai Tso Wan Recreation Ground, Kowloon

June 24; 14:00	Indonesia	5–9	Thailand	Sai Tso Wan Recreation Ground, Kowloon
June 24; 14:00		Boxscore		Sai Tso Wan Recreation Ground, Kowloon

June 25; 10:00	Philippines	10–6	Thailand	Sai Tso Wan Recreation Ground, Kowloon
June 25; 10:00		Boxscore		Sai Tso Wan Recreation Ground, Kowloon

June 25; 14:00	Hong Kong	12–2	Indonesia	Sai Tso Wan Recreation Ground, Kowloon
June 25; 14:00		Boxscore		Sai Tso Wan Recreation Ground, Kowloon

June 26; 10:00	Thailand	9–4	Hong Kong	Sai Tso Wan Recreation Ground, Kowloon
June 26; 10:00		Boxscore		Sai Tso Wan Recreation Ground, Kowloon

June 26; 14:00	Singapore	1–12	Philippines	Sai Tso Wan Recreation Ground, Kowloon
June 26; 14:00		Boxscore		Sai Tso Wan Recreation Ground, Kowloon

June 27; 10:00	Philippines	5–2	Indonesia	Sai Tso Wan Recreation Ground, Kowloon
June 27; 10:00		Boxscore		Sai Tso Wan Recreation Ground, Kowloon

June 27; 14:00	Thailand	17–0	Singapore	Sai Tso Wan Recreation Ground, Kowloon
June 27; 14:00		Boxscore		Sai Tso Wan Recreation Ground, Kowloon

June 28; 10:00	Indonesia	11–1	Singapore	Sai Tso Wan Recreation Ground, Kowloon
June 28; 10:00		Boxscore		Sai Tso Wan Recreation Ground, Kowloon

June 28; 14:00	Hong Kong	5–7	Philippines	Sai Tso Wan Recreation Ground, Kowloon
June 28; 14:00		Boxscore		Sai Tso Wan Recreation Ground, Kowloon
