= Cambodia national baseball team =

Cambodian national baseball team

Information
- Country: Cambodia
- Federation: [Cambodia Baseball Softball Federation] (CBSF)
- Confederation: Baseball Federation of Asia

WBSC ranking
- Current: NR (31 December 2025)

The Cambodian national baseball team is the national baseball team of Cambodia. The team represents Cambodia in international competitions.

== International tournament results ==
=== South East Asian Games ===
Champions Runners up Third place Fourth place

SEA Games Records
Year	Round	Position	Pld	W	L	RS	RA
(Thailand) 2007	Preliminary Round	6th Place	5	0	5	8	88
(Indonesia) 2011	Did not compete						
(Philippines) 2019	Preliminary Round	5th Place	4	0	4	2	43
Total	3 Titles	5th Place					

== History ==
In 2007, Cambodia fielded its first-ever national baseball team to compete in the 24th Southeast Asian Games (SEA Games), held in Bangkok, Thailand, from December 7 to 15.

In their opening game, Cambodia lost to Thailand 16–0 in 4½ innings due to the IBAF mercy rule. In their second game, Cambodia scored its first-ever run against Indonesia, losing 37–1 in 4½-innings. In their third game, Cambodia played a competitive seven innings against the Philippines but was shut out 14–0. Their fourth game marked the team’s first full nine-inning contest, a match that ended in an 11–7 loss to Malaysia. Their final game against Myanmar ended in a 10–0 defeat after seven innings.

Across the five games, Cambodia conceded 88 runs, committed 31 errors, and scored eight runs on 14 hits over 31 innings. While the team did not record any wins, their participation marked Cambodia’s entry into international baseball competition.

=== 2007 SEA Games ===
Team	W	L	PCT	GB	RS	RA	DIFF
Thailand	5	0	1.000	--	67	6	+61
Philippines	4	1	0.800	1	56	6	+50
Indonesia	3	2	0.600	2	70	10	+60
Myanmar	2	3	0.400	3	31	22	+9
Malaysia	1	4	0.200	4	13	113	-100
Cambodia	0	5	0.000	5	8	88	-80

=== 2009 Asian Baseball Cup ===
On May 25, 2009, the Cambodian national baseball team competed in its second international baseball tournament at the 2009 Asian Baseball Cup, held in Bangkok, Thailand.

Cambodia began the competition with a full nine-inning game against Indonesia, losing 6–0. The following day, they faced Hong Kong and were defeated 10–0 in a game that ended after 8½ innings. On the third day, Cambodia played a close game against Myanmar, losing 3–1. On May 29, Cambodia faced Malaysia. Cambodia recorded their first victory in first international baseball competition, defeating Malaysia 20–8.

Results at the 2009 Asian Baseball Cup
Date	Result	Opponent	Score	RS	RA	Notes
25 May 2009	Loss	Indonesia	0–6	0	6	Preliminary Round
26 May 2009	Loss	Hong Kong	0–10	0	10	Preliminary Round
27 May 2009	Loss	Myanmar	1–3	1	3	Preliminary Round
29 May 2009	Win	Malaysia	20–8	20	8	Semi-finals

Rank	Team	W	L	RS	RA
1st	Indonesia	5	0	34	8
2nd	Pakistan	4	1	48	12
3rd	Sri Lanka	3	2	22	22
4th	Hong Kong	2	3	28	20
5th	Thailand	2	2	26	13
6th	Myanmar	1	3	4	24
7th	Cambodia	1	3	21	27
8th	Malaysia	0	4	9	56

=== 2019 SEA Games ===
The Cambodia national baseball team returned to the 30th SEA Game held in Manila, Philippines on December 2–8. It was the first time in ten years they competed internationally. Cambodia scored only two runs while conceding 43, losing all four games. This included 0–12 and 0–14 shutouts to the Philippines and Thailand, respectively.

Results at the 2019 SEA Games
Date	Result	Opponent	Score	RS	RA	Notes
1 December 2019	Loss	Philippines	0–12	0	12	Group Stage
3 December 2019	Loss	Indonesia	1–8	1	8	Group Stage
5 December 2019	Loss	Thailand	0–14	0	14	Group Stage
7 December 2019	Loss	Singapore	1–9	1	9	Group Stage

Rank	Team	W	L	Pct	GB	RS	RA	Diff
1	Philippines	5	0	1.000	0.0	43	6	+37
2	Thailand	3	2	.600	2.0	36	24	+12
3	Indonesia	2	3	.400	3.0	25	27	-2
4	Singapore	1	4	.200	4.0	17	38	-21
5	Cambodia	0	4	.000	4.5	2	43	-41

== Results and fixtures ==
=== 2019 ===
Group Stage	3 December 2019	Cambodia	0–12	Philippines	Clark International Sports Complex, Angeles, Philippines
Group Stage	10:00 PHT

Group Stage	4 December 2019	Indonesia	8–1	Cambodia	Clark International Sports Complex, Angeles, Philippines
Group Stage	10:00 PHT

Group Stage	6 December 2019	Thailand	14–0	Cambodia	Clark International Sports Complex, Angeles, Philippines
Group Stage	14:00 PHT

Classification Match, 5th Place	7 December 2019	Singapore	9–1	Cambodia	Clark International Sports Complex, Angeles, Philippines
Classification Match, 5th Place	10:00 PHT

=== 2023 ===
2023 East Asian Baseball Cup	29 April 2023	Singapore	6–4	Cambodia	Queen Sirikit's 60th Anniversary Stadium, Pathum Thani, Thailand
2023 East Asian Baseball Cup	9:00 ICT

2023 East Asian Baseball Cup	30 April 2023	Cambodia	0–15	Philippines	Queen Sirikit's 60th Anniversary Stadium, Pathum Thani, Thailand
2023 East Asian Baseball Cup	9:00 ICT

2023 East Asian Baseball Cup	1 May 2023	Malaysia	4–7	Cambodia	Queen Sirikit's 60th Anniversary Stadium, Pathum Thani, Thailand
2023 East Asian Baseball Cup	9:00 ICT

2023 East Asian Baseball Cup	2 May 2023	Cambodia	0–9	Laos	Queen Sirikit's 60th Anniversary Stadium, Pathum Thani, Thailand
2023 East Asian Baseball Cup	16:00 ICT

=== 2024 ===
2024 East Asia Baseball Cup	30 October 2024	Thailand	14–4	Cambodia	Clark International Sports Complex, Angeles, Philippines
2024 East Asia Baseball Cup	12:30 PHT

2024 East Asia Baseball Cup	30 October 2024	Hong Kong	5–2	Cambodia	Clark International Sports Complex, Angeles, Philippines
2024 East Asia Baseball Cup	8:00 PHT

2024 East Asia Baseball Cup	31 October 2024	Cambodia	8–12	Malaysia	Clark International Sports Complex, Angeles, Philippines
2024 East Asia Baseball Cup	13:30 PHT

2024 East Asia Baseball Cup	1 November 2024	Indonesia	22–1	Cambodia	Clark International Sports Complex, Angeles, Philippines
2024 East Asia Baseball Cup	13:30 PHT
