= Malaysia national baseball team =

Information
- Country: Malaysia
- Federation: Baseball Federation of Malaysia
- Confederation: WBSC Asia
- Manager: Hussin Hassann

WBSC ranking
- Current: 71 (26 October 2026)

The Malaysia national baseball team (Malay: Pasukan besbol kebangsaan Malaysia) also known as "Harimau Malaya" is the official team that represents Malaysia in international baseball competitions. It operates under the Baseball Federation of Malaysia and serves as the country's representative in regional and global tournaments. The team showcases Malaysian talent and contributes to the growth of the sport within the nation.

Baseball in Malaysia remains a relatively minor sport compared to more popular ones such as football, badminton, and hockey. Despite its limited following and resources, efforts have been made over the years to promote baseball and develop local players. The national team has become a symbol of these efforts, participating in various competitions across Asia.

The team's best performance to date came in 1999 when they achieved a historic 3rd-place finish at the Asia Baseball Cup. This result marked a major milestone for Malaysian baseball and demonstrated the team's potential on the continental stage. Since then, Malaysia has continued to take part in international events, using each tournament as an opportunity to gain valuable experience and inspire a new generation of players back home.

== Results and fixtures ==
Legend

Win Lose Void or postponed Fixture

=== 2023 ===
East Asia Cup	April 29	Philippines	21-1	Malaysia	Queen Sirikit's 60th Anniversary Stadium, Thailand
East Asia Cup	09:00 THT		Boxscore

East Asia Cup	April 30	Malaysia	5-20	Singapore	Queen Sirikit's 60th Anniversary Stadium, Thailand
East Asia Cup	09:00 THT		Boxscore

East Asia Cup	May 1	Cambodia	7-4	Malaysia	Queen Sirikit's 60th Anniversary Stadium, Thailand
East Asia Cup	09:00 THT		Boxscore

East Asia Cup	May 3	Laos	13-1	Malaysia	Queen Sirikit's 60th Anniversary Stadium, Thailand
East Asia Cup	09:00 THT		Boxscore

=== 2024 ===
East Asia Cup	October 29	Malaysia	1-16	Hong Kong	Clark International Sports Complex Stadium 1, Philippines
East Asia Cup	09:00 PHT		Boxscore

East Asia Cup	October 30	Thailand	31-0	Malaysia	Clark International Sports Complex Stadium 1, Philippines
East Asia Cup	13:30 PHT		Boxscore

East Asia Cup	October 31	Cambodia	8-12	Malaysia	Clark International Sports Complex Stadium 1, Philippines
East Asia Cup	13:30 PHT		Boxscore

East Asia Cup	November 2	Malaysia	4-14	Indonesia	Clark International Sports Complex Stadium 1, Philippines
East Asia Cup	13:30 PHT		Boxscore

=== 2025 ===
SEA Games	December 5	Indonesia	10-0	Malaysia	Sirikit Main Baseball Stadium, Pathum Thani
SEA Games	10:20 (UTC+9)		Boxscore

SEA Games	December 6	Malaysia	2-5	Vietnam	Sirikit Secondary Baseball Stadium, Pathum Thani
SEA Games	10:00 (UTC+9)		Boxscore

SEA Games	December 8	Philippines	21-0	Malaysia	Sirikit Main Baseball Stadium, Pathum Thani
SEA Games	14:00 (UTC+9)		Boxscore

SEA Games	December 9	Laos	9-5	Malaysia	Sirikit Secondary Baseball Stadium, Pathum Thani
SEA Games	10:00 (UTC+9)		Boxscore

SEA Games	December 10	Malaysia	7-14	Singapore	Sirikit Main Baseball Stadium, Pathum Thani
SEA Games	9:30 (UTC+9)		Boxscore

SEA Games	December 11	Malaysia	3-17	Thailand	Sirikit Main Baseball Stadium, Pathum Thani
SEA Games	14:00 (UTC+9)		Boxscore

== International tournament results ==
=== Asian Baseball Cup ===
- 1995 to 1997 : Unknown
- 1999 : (bronze) 3rd
- 2001 to 2006 : Unknown
- 2009 : 8th
- 2010 : Did not enter

=== East Asia Baseball Cup ===
- 2012 : Unknown
- 2015 : Did not enter
- 2017 : Unknown

- 2023 : 7th
- 2024 : 6th

=== SEA Games ===
- 2005 : 5th
- 2007 : 5th

- 2011 : 5th
- 2019 : Did not enter
- 2025 : 7th
