= Asia Baseball Cup =

Baseball tournament

- Sport: Baseball
- Founded: 1995; 31 years ago
- Continent: Asia

The Asia Baseball Cup, formerly the Asian Baseball Cup, is a baseball tournament organized by WBSC Asia. It is a second-level tournament to the Asian Baseball Championship.

== History ==
The organization of the BFA Asia Cup was agreed upon by the BFA executive committee in June 1994. The first edition was held in 1995 in Manila.

In 2012, the Asian Baseball Cup was divided into two separate divisions, East and West, alternatively called the East Asian Baseball Cup and West Asian Baseball Cup. From 2016, the Asian Baseball Cup tournaments are held biannually.

The tournament serves as a qualifier for two teams that will later compete in the Asian Baseball Championship, along with Chinese Taipei, Japan, South Korea and China, which automatically qualify for the latter tournament and therefore do not compete at the Asian Baseball Cup.

== Results ==
=== Before 2012 ===
#	Year	Final host	Champions	Runners-up	3rd place	Teams
1	1995; Details	(Philippines); Manila	Philippines	Thailand	India	7
2	1997; Details	(Thailand); Bangkok	Thailand	Indonesia	Pakistan	5
3	1999; Details	(India); Chandigarh	Philippines	India	Malaysia	4
4	2001; Details	(Indonesia); Jakarta	Indonesia	Pakistan	Thailand	6
5	2002; Details	(Thailand); Bangkok	China	Pakistan	Thailand	6
6	2004; Details	(Thailand); Bangkok	Thailand	Pakistan	Indonesia	6
7	2006; Details	(Pakistan); Islamabad	Pakistan	Hong Kong	Thailand	5
8	2009; Details	(Thailand); Bangkok	Indonesia	Pakistan	Sri Lanka	8
9	2010; Details	(Pakistan); Islamabad	Pakistan	Hong Kong	Thailand	4

=== After 2012 ===
==== Eastern Division ====
See footnote

#	Year	Final host	Champions	Runners-up	3rd place	Teams
1	2012; Details	(Thailand); Pathum Thani	Philippines	Thailand	Hong Kong	5
2	2015; Details	(Indonesia); Jakarta	Philippines	Indonesia	Sri Lanka	6
3	2018; Details	Hong Kong	Philippines	Thailand	Hong Kong	5
-	2020		Cancelled due to COVID-19 pandemic			
4	2023; Details	(Thailand); Bangkok	Philippines	Hong Kong	Thailand	7
5	2024; Details	(Philippines); Mabalacat	Philippines	Hong Kong	Thailand	7
6	2026; Details	(Philippines); Manila				6

==== Western Division ====
See footnote

#	Year	Final host	Champions	Runners-up	3rd place	Teams
1	2012; Details	(Pakistan); Lahore	Pakistan	Sri Lanka	Iran	4
2	2013; Details	(Pakistan); Lahore	Pakistan	Sri Lanka	Afghanistan	4
3	2015; Details	(Pakistan); Islamabad	Pakistan	Iran	India	4
4	2017; Details	(Pakistan); Islamabad	Sri Lanka	Pakistan	Iran	5
5	2019; Details	(Sri Lanka); Colombo	Sri Lanka	Pakistan	India	6
-	2021	(Iran); Karaj	Cancelled due to COVID-19 pandemic			
6	2023; Details	(Pakistan); Islamabad	Pakistan	Palestine	Sri Lanka	7
7	2025; Details	(Iran); Karaj	Palestine	Pakistan	Iran	7

== Medals ==
=== Asia Cup (1995–2010) ===
Rank	Nation	Gold	Silver	Bronze	Total
1	Pakistan	2	4	1	7
2	Thailand	2	1	4	7
3	Indonesia	2	1	1	4
4	Philippines	2	0	0	2
5	China	1	0	0	1
6	Hong Kong	0	2	0	2
7	India	0	1	1	2
8	Malaysia	0	0	1	1
8	Sri Lanka	0	0	1	1
Totals (9 entries)		9	9	9	27

=== Two divisions era ===
==== East Asia Cup (2012–2024) ====
Rank	Nation	Gold	Silver	Bronze	Total
1	Philippines	5	0	0	5
2	Hong Kong	0	2	2	4
2	Thailand	0	2	2	4
4	Indonesia	0	1	0	1
5	Sri Lanka	0	0	1	1
Totals (5 entries)		5	5	5	15

==== West Asia Cup (2012–2025) ====
Rank	Nation	Gold	Silver	Bronze	Total
1	Pakistan	4	3	0	7
2	Sri Lanka	2	2	1	5
3	Palestine	1	1	0	2
4	Iran	0	1	3	4
5	India	0	0	2	2
6	Afghanistan	0	0	1	1
Totals (6 entries)		7	7	7	21
