= 2025 Asian Baseball Championship =

International baseball tournament

Tournament details
- Country: China
- Dates: 22–28 September 2025
- Teams: 8
- Defending champions: Japan

Final positions
- Champions: Japan (21st title)
- Runners-up: Chinese Taipei
- Third place: South Korea
- Fourth place: China

Tournament statistics
- Games played: 22

The 31st Asian Baseball Championship was an international professional baseball competition for Asian men's national teams. It was held in Pingtan, China. It was held from 22 to 28 September 2025.

== Qualified teams ==
In November 2024, Philippines and Hong Kong, as winners and finalists of the 2024 East Asia Baseball Cup, qualified for the Asian Baseball Championship. In May 2025, Palestine and Pakistan, as winners and finalists of the 2025 West Asia Baseball Cup, qualified for the Asian Baseball Championship.

- China – Host
- Japan
- Chinese Taipei
- South Korea
- Philippines - 2024 East Asia Baseball Cup winner
- Hong Kong - 2024 East Asia Baseball Cup finalist
- Palestine - 2025 West Asia Baseball Cup winner
- Pakistan - 2025 West Asia Baseball Cup finalist

Group A	Group B
Japan; China; Philippines; Pakistan	Chinese Taipei; South Korea; Hong Kong; Palestine

== Tournament format ==
A total of 8 teams will enter the tournament. The top two finishers of each group will compete in the super round on 26 and 27 September. After the super round, the first and the second-placed teams will play for the title and the third and the fourth-placed teams will play for bronze medal. The Bronze Medal winner, along with the two finalists will qualify for the 2026 U-23 Baseball World Cup.

== Group stage ==
- All times are China Standard Time (UTC+08:00)

=== Group A ===
Pos	Team	Pld	W	L	RF	RA	PCT	GB	Qualification
1	Japan	3	3	0	48	3	1.000	—	Advance to Super round
2	China (H)	3	2	1	14	15	.667	1	Advance to Super round
3	Philippines	3	1	2	14	25	.333	2	Advance to Placement round
4	Pakistan	3	0	3	5	38	.000	3	Advance to Placement round

Source: WBSC
(H) Hosts

Date	Local time	Road team	Score	Home team	Inn.	Venue	Game duration	Attendance	Boxscore
22 Sep	09:30	Japan	18–1	Philippines	F/6	Pingtan Baseball Stadium	2:10	1,500	Boxscore
22 Sep	18:30	Pakistan	0–10	China	F/8	Pingtan International Baseball Stadium	2:26	1,600	Boxscore
23 Sep	12:30	Philippines	2–4	China		Pingtan International Baseball Stadium	2:15	4,500	Boxscore
23 Sep	18:30	Pakistan	2–17	Japan	F/5	Pingtan Baseball Stadium	1:49	50	Boxscore
24 Sep	12:30	Philippines	11–3	Pakistan		Pingtan Baseball Stadium	3:09	58	Boxscore
24 Sep	18:30	China	0–13	Japan	F/7	Pingtan International Baseball Stadium	1:58	1,000	Boxscore

=== Group B ===
Pos	Team	Pld	W	L	RF	RA	PCT	GB	Qualification
1	Chinese Taipei	3	3	0	35	0	1.000	—	Advance to Super round
2	South Korea	3	2	1	25	11	.667	1	Advance to Super round
3	Palestine	3	1	2	5	25	.333	2	Advance to Placement round
4	Hong Kong	3	0	3	3	32	.000	3	Advance to Placement round

Source: WBSC

Date	Local time	Road team	Score	Home team	Inn.	Venue	Game duration	Attendance	Boxscore
22 Sep	12:30	Chinese Taipei	14–0	Palestine	F/7	Pingtan International Baseball Stadium	2:27	285	Boxscore
22 Sep	13:30	Hong Kong	1–16	South Korea	F/6	Pingtan Baseball Stadium	1:58	58	Boxscore
23 Sep	12:30	Palestine	5–2	Hong Kong		Pingtan Baseball Stadium	2:54	180	Boxscore
23 Sep	18:30	South Korea	0–10	Chinese Taipei	F/7	Pingtan International Baseball Stadium	2:17	500	Boxscore
24 Sep	12:30	Palestine	0–9	South Korea		Pingtan International Baseball Stadium	2:24	150	Boxscore
24 Sep	18:30	Hong Kong	0–11	Chinese Taipei	F/7	Pingtan Baseball Stadium	2:08	200	Boxscore

== Placement round ==
Pos	Team	Pld	W	L	RF	RA	PCT	GB
1	Palestine	3	2	1	14	10	.667 (Note: Head-to-head: Palestine 7–3 Philippines)	—
2	Philippines	3	2	1	21	16	.667	—
3	Hong Kong	3	1	2	17	17	.333 (Note: Head-to-head: Hong Kong 9–5 Pakistan)	1
4	Pakistan	3	1	2	13	22	.333	1

Updated to match(es) played on 27 September 2025. Source: WBSC
Notes:

Date	Local time	Road team	Score	Home team	Inn.	Venue	Game duration	Attendance	Boxscore
26 Sep	12:30	Pakistan	5–9	Hong Kong		Pingtan Baseball Stadium	3:16	58	Boxscore
26 Sep	18:30	Philippines	3–7	Palestine		Pingtan Baseball Stadium	2:59	300	Boxscore
27 Sep	12:30	Pakistan	5–2	Palestine		Pingtan Baseball Stadium	2:05	200	Boxscore
27 Sep	18:30	Hong Kong	6–7	Philippines		Pingtan Baseball Stadium	2:57	350	Boxscore

== Super round ==
Pos	Team	Pld	W	L	RF	RA	PCT	GB	Qualification
1	Chinese Taipei	3	2	1	16	3	.667 (Note: Head-to-Head & Team Quality Balance: Chinese Taipei: 1W–1L; TQB +0.5826 Japan: 1W–1L; TQB +0.0098 South Korea: 1W–1L; TQB -0.5897)	—	Advance to Gold medal game
2	Japan	3	2	1	16	3	.667	—	Advance to Gold medal game
3	South Korea	3	2	1	9	16	.667	—	Advance to Bronze medal game
4	China (H)	3	0	3	6	25	.000	2	Advance to Bronze medal game

Source: WBSC
(H) Hosts
Notes:

Date	Local time	Road team	Score	Home team	Inn.	Venue	Game duration	Attendance	Boxscore
26 Sep	12:30	South Korea	8–6	China		Pingtan International Baseball Stadium	2:37	800	Boxscore
26 Sep	18:30	Chinese Taipei	2–3	Japan		Pingtan International Baseball Stadium	2:24	1,500	Boxscore
27 Sep	12:30	China	0–4	Chinese Taipei		Pingtan International Baseball Stadium	2:10	1,550	Boxscore
27 Sep	18:30	South Korea	1–0	Japan		Pingtan International Baseball Stadium	2:27	1,300	Boxscore

== Bronze medal game ==
Date	Local time	Road team	Score	Home team	Inn.	Venue	Game duration	Attendance	Boxscore
28 Sep	12:30	China	3–4	South Korea		Pingtan International Baseball Stadium	2:23	2,000	Boxscore

== Gold medal game ==
Date	Local time	Road team	Score	Home team	Inn.	Venue	Game duration	Attendance	Boxscore
28 Sep	18:30	Japan	11–0	Chinese Taipei		Pingtan International Baseball Stadium	2:49	2,400	Boxscore

== Final standings ==
Rank	Team	Pld	W	L
1st place, gold medalist(s)	Japan	6	5	1
2nd place, silver medalist(s)	Chinese Taipei	6	4	2
3rd place, bronze medalist(s)	South Korea	6	5	1
4	China	6	2	4
5	Palestine	5	2	3
6	Philippines	5	2	3
7	Hong Kong	5	1	4
8	Pakistan	5	1	4

Qualified for 2026 U-23 Baseball World Cup

== Awards ==
The BFA announced the winners of Individual Awards, as well as the tournament's All-Star Team.

All-Star Team
Position	Player
Starting Pitcher	(Japan) Shota Masui
Relief Pitcher	(China) Qi Xin
Catcher	(South Korea) Ryu Hyeon-jun
First Baseman	(Pakistan) Sameer Ahmed Khatri
Second Baseman	(Japan) Yukiya Yano
Third Baseman	(Chinese Taipei) Kao Yu-Wei
Shortstop	(Philippines) Lord de Vera
Outfielders	(Japan) Keisho Amiya (Philippines) John Reymond Vargas (Hong Kong) Tsz Yin Jordan Wen
Designated Hitter	(Hong Kong) Anson Fung

Individual Awards
Award	Player	Value
Most Valuable Player	(Japan) Kazuki Kondo	
Leading Hitter (Best Batting Average)	(Philippines) Lord de Vera	0.632
Pitcher with the Best ERA	(South Korea) Hong Min-gyu	0.00; 9.1 IP
Pitcher with the Best Win/Loss Average	(South Korea) Hong Min-gyu	2W - 0L; 9.1 IP
Most Runs Batted In (RBI)	(Japan) Keisho Amiya	9
Most Home Runs	(Philippines) John Reymond Vargas	2
Most Stolen Bases	(Palestine) Yunis Haleem	6
Most Runs Scored	(Japan) Manami Soeda	7
Best Defensive Player	(Chinese Taipei) Lin Yu-Li	
