= 2010 Intercontinental Cup (baseball) =

Tournament details
- Country: Taiwan
- Dates: 23–31 October
- Teams: 10
- Defending champions: Cuba

Final positions
- Champions: Cuba (11th title)
- Runners-up: Netherlands
- Third place: Italy
- Fourth place: Chinese Taipei

Tournament statistics
- Games played: 36
- Attendance: 53,356 (1,482 per game)

The 2010 IBAF Intercontinental Cup was an international baseball competition, held in Taichung, at the Taichung Intercontinental Baseball Stadium, and Douliu, at the Douliu Baseball Stadium, Taiwan from October 23 to 31, 2010.

== Teams ==
The following 10 teams confirmed their appearance.

Pool A		Pool B	
Chinese Taipei	2006 Intercontinental Cup	Italy	6th, 2006 Intercontinental Cup
Cuba	2006 Intercontinental Cup	Japan	4th, 2006 Intercontinental Cup
Czech Republic	1st appearance	Netherlands	2006 Intercontinental Cup
Hong Kong	1st appearance	Nicaragua	5th, 1997 Intercontinental Cup
South Korea	7th, 2006 Intercontinental Cup	Thailand	1st appearance

== Round 1 ==
=== Pool A ===
==== Standings ====
Teams	W	L	Pct.	GB	R	RA
Cuba	4	0	1.000	–	43	0
Chinese Taipei	3	1	.750	1	27	7
South Korea	2	2	.500	2	31	16
Czech Republic	1	3	.250	3	16	33
Hong Kong	0	4	.000	4	2	63

==== Schedule ====
October 23, 2010; 12:30 UTC+8	Chinese Taipei	11–5	South Korea	Taichung Intercontinental Baseball Stadium; Attendance: 15,300
October 23, 2010; 12:30 UTC+8		Boxscore		Taichung Intercontinental Baseball Stadium; Attendance: 15,300

October 23, 2010; 18:30 UTC+8	Czech Republic	0–18 (F/6)	Cuba	Douliu Baseball Stadium; Attendance: 150
October 23, 2010; 18:30 UTC+8		Boxscore		Douliu Baseball Stadium; Attendance: 150

October 24, 2010; 12:30 UTC+8	South Korea	17–2 (F/5)	Hong Kong	Taichung Intercontinental Baseball Stadium; Attendance: 135
October 24, 2010; 12:30 UTC+8		Boxscore		Taichung Intercontinental Baseball Stadium; Attendance: 135

October 24, 2010; 12:30 UTC+8	Czech Republic	0–6	Chinese Taipei	Douliu Baseball Stadium; Attendance: 3,276
October 24, 2010; 12:30 UTC+8		Boxscore		Douliu Baseball Stadium; Attendance: 3,276

October 25, 2010; 18:30 UTC+8	Hong Kong	0–10 (F/7)	Chinese Taipei	Taichung Intercontinental Baseball Stadium; Attendance: 1,050
October 25, 2010; 18:30 UTC+8		Boxscore		Taichung Intercontinental Baseball Stadium; Attendance: 1,050

October 25, 2010; 18:30 UTC+8	Cuba	3–0	South Korea	Douliu Baseball Stadium; Attendance: 200
October 25, 2010; 18:30 UTC+8		Boxscore		Douliu Baseball Stadium; Attendance: 200

October 26, 2010; 12:30 UTC+8	Hong Kong	0–16 (F/6)	Czech Republic	Taichung Intercontinental Baseball Stadium; Attendance: 90
October 26, 2010; 12:30 UTC+8		Boxscore		Taichung Intercontinental Baseball Stadium; Attendance: 90

October 26, 2010; 18:30 UTC+8	Chinese Taipei	0–2	Cuba	Douliu Baseball Stadium; Attendance: 7,097
October 26, 2010; 18:30 UTC+8		Boxscore		Douliu Baseball Stadium; Attendance: 7,097

October 27, 2010; 12:30 UTC+8	Cuba	20–0 (F/5)	Hong Kong	Taichung Intercontinental Baseball Stadium; Attendance: 72
October 27, 2010; 12:30 UTC+8		Boxscore		Taichung Intercontinental Baseball Stadium; Attendance: 72

October 27, 2010; 18:30 UTC+8	South Korea	9–0	Czech Republic	Douliu Baseball Stadium; Attendance: 25
October 27, 2010; 18:30 UTC+8		Boxscore		Douliu Baseball Stadium; Attendance: 25

=== Pool B ===
==== Standings ====
Teams	W	L	Pct.	GB	R	RA
Netherlands	3	1	.750	–	24	5
Japan	3	1	.750	–	25	4
Italy	3	1	.750	–	23	18
Nicaragua	1	3	.250	2	21	22
Thailand	0	4	.000	4	11	55

==== Schedule ====
October 23, 2010; 19:30 UTC+8	Nicaragua	0–8	Japan	Taichung Intercontinental Baseball Stadium; Attendance: 300
October 23, 2010; 19:30 UTC+8		Boxscore		Taichung Intercontinental Baseball Stadium; Attendance: 300

October 23, 2010; 15:30 UTC+8	Italy	0–10 (F/7)	Netherlands	Douliu Baseball Stadium; Attendance: 125
October 23, 2010; 15:30 UTC+8		Boxscore		Douliu Baseball Stadium; Attendance: 125

October 24, 2010; 18:30 UTC+8	Thailand	6–15	Italy	Taichung Intercontinental Baseball Stadium; Attendance: 120
October 24, 2010; 18:30 UTC+8		Boxscore		Taichung Intercontinental Baseball Stadium; Attendance: 120

October 24, 2010; 18:30 UTC+8	Nicaragua	1–6	Netherlands	Douliu Baseball Stadium; Attendance: 300
October 24, 2010; 18:30 UTC+8		Boxscore		Douliu Baseball Stadium; Attendance: 300

October 25, 2010; 12:30 UTC+8	Italy	5–2	Nicaragua	Taichung Intercontinental Baseball Stadium; Attendance: 100
October 25, 2010; 12:30 UTC+8		Boxscore		Taichung Intercontinental Baseball Stadium; Attendance: 100

October 25, 2010; 12:30 UTC+8	Japan	15–0 (F/5)	Thailand	Douliu Baseball Stadium; Attendance: 60
October 25, 2010; 12:30 UTC+8		Boxscore		Douliu Baseball Stadium; Attendance: 60

October 26, 2010; 12:30 UTC+8	Thailand	3–18 (F/7)	Nicaragua	Douliu Baseball Stadium; Attendance: 105
October 26, 2010; 12:30 UTC+8		Boxscore		Douliu Baseball Stadium; Attendance: 105

October 26, 2010; 18:30 UTC+8	Netherlands	1–2	Japan	Taichung Intercontinental Baseball Stadium; Attendance: 250
October 26, 2010; 18:30 UTC+8		Boxscore		Taichung Intercontinental Baseball Stadium; Attendance: 250

October 27, 2010; 12:30 UTC+8	Netherlands	7–2	Thailand	Taichung Intercontinental Baseball Stadium; Attendance: 59
October 27, 2010; 12:30 UTC+8		Boxscore		Taichung Intercontinental Baseball Stadium; Attendance: 59

October 27, 2010; 18:30 UTC+8	Japan	0–3	Italy	Douliu Baseball Stadium; Attendance: 50
October 27, 2010; 18:30 UTC+8		Boxscore		Douliu Baseball Stadium; Attendance: 50

== Round 2 ==
=== Pool C ===
==== Standings ====
Teams	W	L	Pct.	GB	R	RA
Cuba	5	0	1.000	–	20	7
Netherlands	3	2	.600	2	22	12
Chinese Taipei	3	2	.600	2	32	19
Italy	2	3	.400	3	13	23
South Korea	1	4	.200	4	16	23
Japan	1	4	.200	4	9	28

==== Schedule ====
October 28, 2010; 12:30 UTC+8	Cuba	6–3	Netherlands	Taichung Intercontinental Baseball Stadium; Attendance: 125
October 28, 2010; 12:30 UTC+8		Boxscore		Taichung Intercontinental Baseball Stadium; Attendance: 125

October 28, 2010; 14:00 UTC+8	Italy	5–2	South Korea	Douliu Baseball Stadium; Attendance: 58
October 28, 2010; 14:00 UTC+8		Boxscore		Douliu Baseball Stadium; Attendance: 58

October 28, 2010; 18:30 UTC+8	Chinese Taipei	12–5	Japan	Taichung Intercontinental Baseball Stadium; Attendance: 3,837
October 28, 2010; 18:30 UTC+8		Boxscore		Taichung Intercontinental Baseball Stadium; Attendance: 3,837

October 29, 2010; 12:30 UTC+8	Cuba	4–1	Japan	Taichung Intercontinental Baseball Stadium; Attendance: 175
October 29, 2010; 12:30 UTC+8		Boxscore		Taichung Intercontinental Baseball Stadium; Attendance: 175

October 29, 2010; 14:00 UTC+8	Netherlands	3–1	South Korea	Douliu Baseball Stadium; Attendance: 42
October 29, 2010; 14:00 UTC+8		Boxscore		Douliu Baseball Stadium; Attendance: 42

October 29, 2010; 18:30 UTC+8	Chinese Taipei	6–2	Italy	Taichung Intercontinental Baseball Stadium; Attendance: 3,425
October 29, 2010; 18:30 UTC+8		Boxscore		Taichung Intercontinental Baseball Stadium; Attendance: 3,425

October 30, 2010; 12:30 UTC+8	Netherlands	5–3 (F/10)	Chinese Taipei	Taichung Intercontinental Baseball Stadium; Attendance: 9,064
October 30, 2010; 12:30 UTC+8		Boxscore		Taichung Intercontinental Baseball Stadium; Attendance: 9,064

October 30, 2010; 14:00 UTC+8	Cuba	5–3	Italy	Taichung Intercontinental Baseball Stadium; Attendance: 150
October 30, 2010; 14:00 UTC+8		Boxscore		Taichung Intercontinental Baseball Stadium; Attendance: 150

October 30, 2010; 18:30 UTC+8	Japan	1–8	South Korea	Taichung Intercontinental Baseball Stadium; Attendance: 333
October 30, 2010; 18:30 UTC+8		Boxscore		Taichung Intercontinental Baseball Stadium; Attendance: 333

=== Semifinals 8th–10th ===
October 29, 2010; 12:30 UTC+8	Czech Republic	13–3 (F/7)	Thailand	Taichung Baseball Stadium; Attendance: 21
October 29, 2010; 12:30 UTC+8		Boxscore		Taichung Baseball Stadium; Attendance: 21

October 29, 2010; 18:30 UTC+8	Nicaragua	12–2 (F/7)	Hong Kong	Taichung Baseball Stadium; Attendance: 24
October 29, 2010; 18:30 UTC+8		Boxscore		Taichung Baseball Stadium; Attendance: 24

== Round 3 ==
=== Finals ===
==== 9th–10th place Final ====
October 30, 2010; 12:30 UTC+8	Thailand	6–5	Hong Kong	Taichung Baseball Stadium; Attendance: 145
October 30, 2010; 12:30 UTC+8		Boxscore		Taichung Baseball Stadium; Attendance: 145

==== 7th–8th place Final ====
October 30, 2010; 18:30 UTC+8	Czech Republic	5–11	Nicaragua	Taichung Baseball Stadium; Attendance: 70
October 30, 2010; 18:30 UTC+8		Boxscore		Taichung Baseball Stadium; Attendance: 70

==== 5th–6th place Final ====
October 31, 2010; 12:30 UTC+8	South Korea	1–2	Japan	Douliu Baseball Stadium; Attendance: 150
October 31, 2010; 12:30 UTC+8		Boxscore		Douliu Baseball Stadium; Attendance: 150

==== Bronze Medal ====
October 31, 2010; 12:30 UTC+8	Chinese Taipei	3–4	Italy	Taichung Intercontinental Baseball Stadium; Attendance: 6,553
October 31, 2010; 12:30 UTC+8		Boxscore		Taichung Intercontinental Baseball Stadium; Attendance: 6,553

==== Gold Medal ====
October 31, 2010; 18:30 UTC+8	Cuba	4–1	Netherlands	Taichung Intercontinental Baseball Stadium; Attendance: 320
October 31, 2010; 18:30 UTC+8		Boxscore		Taichung Intercontinental Baseball Stadium; Attendance: 320

== Final standings ==
Rk	Team	W	L
1st place, gold medalist(s)	Cuba	8	0
2nd place, silver medalist(s)	Netherlands	5	3
3rd place, bronze medalist(s)	Italy	5	3
4	Chinese Taipei	5	3
5	Japan	4	4
6	South Korea	3	5
7	Nicaragua	3	3
8	Czech Republic	2	4
9	Thailand	1	5
10	Hong Kong	0	6

2010 Intercontinental Cup winners

Cuba
11th title

== Awards ==
The IBAF announced the following awards at the completion of the tournament.

All Star Team
Position	Player
Starting Pitcher	(Chinese Taipei) Pan Wei-Lun
Relief Pitcher	(Cuba) Yadier Pedroso
Catcher	(Italy) Juan Angrisano
First Base	(Netherlands) Curt Smith
Second Base	(Cuba) Héctor Olivera
Third Base	(Cuba) Yulieski Gourriel
Short Stop	(Netherlands) Mariekson Gregorius
Outfield	(Cuba) Alexei Bell
Outfield	(Cuba) Giorvis Duvergel
Outfield	(Chinese Taipei) Che-Hsuan Lin
Designated Hitter	(South Korea) Kim Jae-Hwan

Tournament Awards
Award	Player
MVP	(Cuba) Héctor Olivera
Leading Hitter	(Cuba) Héctor Olivera
Best Earned Run Average	(Chinese Taipei) Pan Wei-Lun
Best Won/Loss Average	(Cuba) Dalier Hinojosa
Most Runs Batted In	(Cuba) Alfredo Despaigne
Most Home Runs	(South Korea) Kim Jae-Hwan
Most Stolen Bases	(South Korea) Jung Soo-Bin
Most Runs Scored	(Cuba) Héctor Olivera
Outstanding Defensive Player	(Netherlands) Mariekson Gregorius

== See also ==
- List of sporting events in Taiwan
