= Lord de Vera =

Baseball player (born 2003)

- Shortstop
- Born: September 13, 2003 (age 23); Tanauan, Batangas, Philippines
- Bats: Right Throws: Right

Baseball United debut
- November 14, 2025, for the Mumbai Cobras
Medals
Men's baseball
For the Philippines
East Asia Baseball Cup
Gold medal – first place	2023 Bangkok	Team
Gold medal – first place	2024 Philippines	Team

Lord Aragorn "Agon" O. de Vera (born September 11, 2003) is a Filipino professional baseball player who is part of the Mumbai Cobras of the Baseball United.

== Early life and education ==
De Vera is born on September 11, 2003, in Tanauan, Batangas to a family of athletes. His father was a basketball player while his mother is a softball player. He was taught baseball by a family friend who is a coach from the same city. He attended the De La Salle University in Manila.

== Collegiate career ==
De Vera has played for the De La Salle Green Batters as an infielder in the baseball championships of the University Athletic Association of the Philippines. He was scouted by a De La Salle coach during the Asia-Pacific baseball tournament in Clark as an eight-grader.

The team won the Season 85 championship and ended as runners-up in Seasons 86 and Season 87.

== Professional career ==
De Vera received an invite to participate in a workout with the Arizona Diamondbacks of Major League Baseball in 2024.

In September 2025, de Vera signed a contract with Mumbai Cobras of the Baseball United league. In doing so, he became the first Filipino-born player to sign a professional contract since Claudio Manela, who debuted in 1921 for the Cincinnati Cuban Stars in the first Negro National League. He made his Baseball United debut on November 14, 2025, during the game against the Karachi Monarchs.

== National team ==
De Vera has played for the Philippines national baseball team as a shortstop. He debuted for the national team at the 2023 East Asian Baseball Cup. He was the main shortstop of the team in the 2022 Asian Games in Hangzhou, China.

== Personal life ==
Lord de Vera has a younger brother named Liam, who also played for De La Salle. De Vera's second given name was derived from Aragorn, a character from The Lord of the Rings.
