= Baseball in Thailand =

Overview of baseball as played in Thailand

Baseball is a minor but internationally competitive sport in Thailand, governed nationally by the Baseball Association of Thailand (BBAT), formerly the Amateur Baseball Association of Thailand (ABAT). The sport's roots in the country trace to expatriate community leagues in Bangkok in the mid-20th century, while its modern, internationally sanctioned form developed from 1992 onward with Japanese federation support. Thailand fields men's, women's, and youth national teams, and Thai baseball produced Major League Baseball veteran Johnny Damon, who represented the country — his mother's birthplace — at the 2013 World Baseball Classic qualifiers.

== History ==
=== Early expatriate origins ===
The earliest organized baseball in Thailand is traced by the Bangkok Baseball and Softball Association (BBSA) to 1950, when youth baseball and softball began being played on the grounds of the American Embassy in Bangkok. The BBSA grew out of that embassy-grounds activity into a longstanding youth league serving players aged 4 to 18, later relocating to the campus of the International School Bangkok and organizing both a volunteer-coached "Divisional" program and a higher-intensity "Club" travel program that competed in regional tournaments such as the Southeast Asia Youth Baseball/Softball Tournament (SEAYBST). The BBSA announced an indefinite pause to its operations in September 2024, citing the impact of COVID-19-era disruption and the departure of expatriate families who had supported the organization.

=== Formalization and international debut (1992–1990s) ===
Baseball's development as an organized, nationally governed sport in Thailand began with the establishment of the Amateur Baseball Association of Thailand (ABAT) on 3 January 1992. The association was sanctioned by Thailand's National Culture Commission and the Sports Authority of Thailand, and was recognized by the Olympic Committee of Thailand as the sole governing body for the sport in the country. Its early development was supported by the Baseball Federation of Japan in cooperation with the Minebea Group, a Japanese manufacturer with operations in Thailand.

Thailand began competing internationally in baseball during the 1990s, making its debut at the 1994 Asian Games. The national team also reached the final of the Southeast Asian qualifying tournament for baseball at the 1996 Summer Olympics in Atlanta.

=== Regional success and the Johnny Damon era (2000s–2010s) ===
Thailand's national team won gold at baseball at the 2007 Southeast Asian Games and took bronze at the 2011 Southeast Asian Games. The team also competed at the Asian Championship, with a best finish of fifth place in 2007.

In November 2012, former Boston Red Sox and New York Yankees outfielder Johnny Damon (whose mother was born in Thailand) joined the Thailand national team to play in the qualifying tournament for the 2013 World Baseball Classic, held in New Taipei City, Taiwan. Damon, a 2004 World Series champion with the Red Sox, was described as the only player of Thai heritage to have played in Major League Baseball. He began training with the squad at the national team's Klong 6 practice venue in Bangkok and went 3-for-7 with a walk across Thailand's two tournament games, both losses, to the Philippines and New Zealand. Damon later said he hoped his participation would help raise the international profile of Thai baseball, estimating it could take Thailand ten to twenty years to develop the sport further, and was inducted into the Asian Hall of Fame in 2017, where he spoke about honoring his mother's heritage.

=== Women's and youth baseball development ===
Women's baseball in Thailand developed later than the men's program. The Thailand women's national baseball team, also organized by the BBAT, made its first appearance in Baseball Federation of Asia competition at the 2023 Women's Baseball Asian Cup qualifiers, finishing second in its group after an 8–9 loss to India and an 11–3 win over Malaysia. Thailand went on to host the 2025 Asian Cup Qualifiers, finishing fourth to qualify for the 2025 Women's Baseball Asian Cup. As of December 2024, the Thailand women's team was ranked 19th in the WBSC world rankings, well ahead of the men's team's ranking at the time.

Thailand also fields under-15 and under-18 national teams that compete in age-group competition organized by the Baseball Federation of Asia.

== Governing body ==
The Baseball Association of Thailand (BBAT) is headquartered at the Sports Authority of Thailand complex in the Hua Mak area of Bang Kapi district, Bangkok, and is a member of the Baseball Federation of Asia (BFA). It governs the men's, women's, and age-group national teams and organizes national-level tournaments intended to promote grassroots participation.

== Domestic competition ==
Domestic baseball in Thailand has historically been organized into distinct tiers by age. Little League baseball, for players aged roughly 9 to 12, has been fielded by a small number of local teams; the BFA has noted sending Thailand Little League representatives to international Little League tournaments. Youth club baseball in Bangkok was, for decades, centered on the BBSA's divisional and travel programs based at the International School Bangkok, before that organization's 2024 pause.

== Venues ==
The national team's primary training venue is Queen Sirikit's 60th Anniversary Stadium, located at Klong 6 in Pathum Thani.

== Notable people ==
- Johnny Damon — 2004 World Series champion with the Boston Red Sox; represented Thailand, his mother's birth country, at the 2013 World Baseball Classic qualifiers in 2012, the only Major League Baseball player to have played for the Thailand national team.

== See also ==
- Thailand national baseball team
- Thailand women's national baseball team
- Baseball Association of Thailand
- Baseball Federation of Asia
- Sport in Thailand
- Baseball5
