= Singapore national baseball team =

Information
- Country: Singapore
- Federation: Singapore Baseball & Softball Association
- Confederation: WBSC Asia
- Manager: Hideyuki Uchida

WBSC ranking
- Current: 46 (26 March 2026)

The Singapore national baseball team is the national baseball team of Singapore. The team represents Singapore in international competitions.

== History ==
Baseball was reintroduced in Singapore in the post–World War II period, with one of the earliest recorded matches involving visiting American Navy officers playing at the Padang. The national team began competing in official international tournaments in the early 2000s.

=== Asian Baseball Cup ===
Singapore has taken part in several editions of the Asian Baseball Cup – Eastern Division and other regional events:

In the 2002 Asian Baseball Cup – Eastern Division held in Thailand, Singapore placed sixth.

In the 2004 Asian Baseball Cup – Eastern Division, also in Thailand, Singapore placed fifth and recorded its first international win, defeating Sri Lanka 12–10.

In the 2012 Asian Baseball Cup – Eastern Division in Thailand, Singapore placed fourth. The team defeated Myanmar 4–3, scoring all four runs in the final inning.

In the 2015 Asian Baseball Cup – Eastern Division held in Indonesia, the team placed sixth.

In the 2018 Asian Baseball Cup – Eastern Division in Hong Kong, Singapore placed fifth.

=== Hong Kong International Open ===
The team has also competed in multiple editions of the Hong Kong International Baseball Open:

At the IBAF Hong Kong International Baseball Open 2013, Singapore placed fifth and recorded a no-hit, no-run game against Team Shenzhen in its final placement match.

At the WBSC Hong Kong International Baseball Open 2017, the team finished second in the National Team category.

Singapore again finished second in the same category at the WBSC Hong Kong International Baseball Open 2018.

=== SEA Games ===
Singapore made its SEA Games baseball debut at the 2019 Southeast Asian Games held in the Philippines, where they placed fourth. The team drew level with Indonesia at 4–4 in the bottom of the eighth inning during their match. They lost 4–10.

== Competition record ==
=== Asian Games ===
Asian Games record
Year	Result	Rank	W	L	RS	RA
(Japan) 1994	did not participate					
(Thailand) 1998	did not participate					
(South Korea) 2002	did not participate					
(Qatar) 2006	did not participate					
(China) 2010	did not participate					
(South Korea) 2014	did not participate					
(Indonesia) 2018	did not participate					
(China) 2022	First Stage	9th	0	2	7	25
(Japan) 2026	did not participate					
Total			0	2	7	25

=== SEA Games ===
SEA Games record
Year	Result	Pos	Pld	W	L	RS	RA
(Philippines) 2005	did not participate						
(Thailand) 2007	did not participate						
(Indonesia) 2011	did not participate						
(Philippines) 2019	Final Round	4th	5	1	4	27	54
(Thailand) 2025
Total	0 Titles	1/4	5	1	4	27	54

== Results and fixtures ==
The following is a list of professional baseball match results currently active in the latest version of the WBSC World Rankings, as well as any future matches that have been scheduled.

=== 2019 ===
Group Stage	2 December 2019	Singapore	7–14	Indonesia	Clark International Sports Complex, Angeles, Philippines
Group Stage	11:00 PHT

Group Stage	3 December 2019	Thailand	12–7	Singapore	Clark International Sports Complex, Angeles, Philippines
Group Stage	11:00 PHT

Group Stage	4 December 2019	Philippines	17–0	Singapore	Clark International Sports Complex, Angeles, Philippines
Group Stage	13:00 PHT

Group Stage	7 December 2019	Singapore	9–1	Cambodia	Clark International Sports Complex, Angeles, Philippines
Group Stage	13:00 PHT

Final	8 December 2019	Indonesia	10–4	Singapore	Clark International Sports Complex, Angeles, Philippines
Final	13:00 PHT

=== 2023 ===
2023 East Asian Baseball Cup	29 April 2023	Singapore	6–4	Cambodia	Queen Sirikit's 60th Anniversary Stadium, Pathum Thani province, Pathum Thani, Thailand
2023 East Asian Baseball Cup	9:00 ICT

2023 East Asian Baseball Cup	30 April 2023	Singapore	20–5	Malaysia	Queen Sirikit's 60th Anniversary Stadium, Pathum Thani province, Pathum Thani, Thailand
2023 East Asian Baseball Cup	9:00 ICT

2023 East Asian Baseball Cup	1 May 2023	Philippines	20–0	Singapore	Queen Sirikit's 60th Anniversary Stadium, Pathum Thani province, Pathum Thani, Thailand
2023 East Asian Baseball Cup	9:00 ICT

2023 East Asian Baseball Cup	4 May 2023	Thailand	13–0	Singapore	Queen Sirikit's 60th Anniversary Stadium, Pathum Thani province, Pathum Thani, Thailand
2023 East Asian Baseball Cup	9:00 ICT

Baseball at the 2022 Asian Games	27 September 2023	Singapore	7–8	Laos	Shaoxing Baseball & Softball Sports Center, Shaoxing, China
Baseball at the 2022 Asian Games	17:30 CST

Baseball at the 2022 Asian Games	28 September 2023	Thailand	17–0	Singapore	Shaoxing Baseball & Softball Sports Center, Shaoxing, China
Baseball at the 2022 Asian Games	17:30 CST

=== 2024 ===
2024 East Asia Baseball Cup	30 October 2024	Singapore	0–15	Philippines	Clark International Sports Complex, Angeles, Philippines
2024 East Asia Baseball Cup	13:30 PHT

2024 East Asia Baseball Cup	31 October 2024	Indonesia	9–11	Singapore	Clark International Sports Complex, Angeles, Philippines
2024 East Asia Baseball Cup	13:30 PHT

2024 East Asia Baseball Cup	1 November 2024	Hong Kong	14–4	Singapore	Clark International Sports Complex, Angeles, Philippines
2024 East Asia Baseball Cup	9:00 PHT

2024 East Asia Baseball Cup	2 November 2024	Thailand	10–3	Singapore	Clark International Sports Complex, Angeles, Philippines
2024 East Asia Baseball Cup	9:00 PHT

2024 East Asia Baseball Cup	3 November 2024	Thailand	11–10	Singapore	Clark International Sports Complex, Angeles, Philippines
2024 East Asia Baseball Cup	10:00 PHT
