= 2023 East Asian Baseball Cup =

- Event logo

Tournament details
- Country: Thailand
- Dates: 29 April – 4 May
- Teams: 7

Final positions
- Champions: Philippines (4th title)
- Runners-up: Hong Kong
- Third place: Thailand
- Fourth place: Singapore

Tournament statistics
- Games played: 17

The 2023 East Asian Baseball Cup (Thai: เบสบอลชิงแชมป์เอเชียตะวันออกครั้งที่ 13) is the 13th edition of the tournament, held from 29 April to 4 May 2023 at the Queen Sirikit's 60th Anniversary Stadium in Pathum Thani (Note: Marketed as being held in Bangkok), Thailand.

Originally scheduled for 2019, the tournament was postponed due to the COVID-19 pandemic.

The Philippines won their fourth consecutive East Asian title.

== Participants ==
- Cambodia
- Hong Kong
- Laos
- Malaysia
- Philippines
- Singapore
- Thailand

== Results ==
=== First round ===
==== Group A ====
Pos	Team	Pld	W	L	RF	RA	PCT	GB	Qualification
1	Hong Kong	2	2	0	33	8	1.000	—	Super Round
2	Thailand (H)	2	1	1	20	15	.500	1	Super Round
3	Laos	2	0	2	0	30	.000	2	Placement Round

Source: BFA
(H) Hosts

29 April	Hong Kong	15–8	Thailand	Queen Sirikit's 60th Anniversary Stadium, Pathum Thani
29 April		Box		Queen Sirikit's 60th Anniversary Stadium, Pathum Thani

30 April	Laos	0–18	Hong Kong	Queen Sirikit's 60th Anniversary Stadium, Pathum Thani
30 April		Box		Queen Sirikit's 60th Anniversary Stadium, Pathum Thani

1 May	Thailand	12–0	Laos	Queen Sirikit's 60th Anniversary Stadium, Pathum Thani
1 May		Box		Queen Sirikit's 60th Anniversary Stadium, Pathum Thani

==== Group B ====
Pos	Team	Pld	W	L	RF	RA	PCT	GB	Qualification
1	Philippines	3	3	0	56	1	1.000	—	Super Round
2	Singapore	3	2	1	20	25	.667	1	Super Round
3	Cambodia	3	1	2	7	19	.333	2	Placement Round
4	Malaysia	3	0	3	10	48	.000	3	Placement Round

Source: BFA

29 April	Singapore	6–4	Cambodia	Queen Sirikit's 60th Anniversary Stadium, Pathum Thani
29 April		Box		Queen Sirikit's 60th Anniversary Stadium, Pathum Thani

29 April	Malaysia	1–21	Philippines	Queen Sirikit's 60th Anniversary Stadium, Pathum Thani
29 April		Box		Queen Sirikit's 60th Anniversary Stadium, Pathum Thani

30 April	Cambodia	0–15	Philippines	Queen Sirikit's 60th Anniversary Stadium, Pathum Thani
30 April		Box		Queen Sirikit's 60th Anniversary Stadium, Pathum Thani

30 April	Singapore	20–5	Malaysia	Queen Sirikit's 60th Anniversary Stadium, Pathum Thani
30 April		Box		Queen Sirikit's 60th Anniversary Stadium, Pathum Thani

1 May	Malaysia	4–7	Cambodia	Queen Sirikit's 60th Anniversary Stadium, Pathum Thani
1 May		Box		Queen Sirikit's 60th Anniversary Stadium, Pathum Thani

1 May	Philippines	20–0	Singapore	Queen Sirikit's 60th Anniversary Stadium, Pathum Thani
1 May		Box		Queen Sirikit's 60th Anniversary Stadium, Pathum Thani

=== Final stage ===
==== Placement round ====
Pos	Team	Pld	W	L	RF	RA	PCT	GB
1	Laos	2	2	0	22	1	1.000	—
2	Cambodia	2	1	1	0	9	.500	1
3	Malaysia	2	0	2	1	13	.000	2

Source: BFA

2 May	Cambodia	0–9	Laos	Queen Sirikit's 60th Anniversary Stadium, Pathum Thani
2 May		Box		Queen Sirikit's 60th Anniversary Stadium, Pathum Thani

3 May	Malaysia	1–13	Laos	Queen Sirikit's 60th Anniversary Stadium, Pathum Thani
3 May		Box		Queen Sirikit's 60th Anniversary Stadium, Pathum Thani

==== Super round ====
Pos	Team	Pld	W	L	RF	RA	PCT	GB	Qualification
1	Philippines	3	3	0	20	5	1.000	—	Gold Medal
2	Hong Kong	3	2	1	4	8	.667	1	Gold Medal
3	Singapore	3	1	2	10	3	.333	2	Bronze Medal
4	Thailand	3	0	3	4	22	.000	3	Bronze Medal

Source: BFA

2 May	Thailand	4–12	Philippines	Queen Sirikit's 60th Anniversary Stadium, Pathum Thani
2 May		Box		Queen Sirikit's 60th Anniversary Stadium, Pathum Thani

2 May	Singapore	0–3	Hong Kong	Queen Sirikit's 60th Anniversary Stadium, Pathum Thani
2 May		Box		Queen Sirikit's 60th Anniversary Stadium, Pathum Thani

3 May	Singapore	0–10	Thailand	Queen Sirikit's 60th Anniversary Stadium, Pathum Thani
3 May		Box		Queen Sirikit's 60th Anniversary Stadium, Pathum Thani

3 May	Hong Kong	1–8	Philippines	Queen Sirikit's 60th Anniversary Stadium, Pathum Thani
3 May		Box		Queen Sirikit's 60th Anniversary Stadium, Pathum Thani

==== Bronze medal game ====
4 May	Thailand	13–0	Singapore	Queen Sirikit's 60th Anniversary Stadium, Pathum Thani
4 May		Box		Queen Sirikit's 60th Anniversary Stadium, Pathum Thani

Team	1	2	3	4	5	6	7	R	H	E
Thailand	3	0	0	0	1	7	2	13	10	1
Singapore	0	0	0	0	0	0	0	0	4	7

==== Gold medal game ====
4 May	Hong Kong	2–10	Philippines	Queen Sirikit's 60th Anniversary Stadium, Pathum Thani
4 May		Box		Queen Sirikit's 60th Anniversary Stadium, Pathum Thani

Team	1	2	3	4	5	6	7	8	9	R	H	E
Hong Kong	0	0	1	0	0	0	0	0	1	2	5	2
Philippines	1	0	0	6	0	2	0	1	X	10	9	0

== Final standings ==
The Baseball Federation of Asia (BFA) has published the Final Ranking at the conclusion of the tournament.

Rank	Team	Pld	W	L
1st place, gold medalist(s)	Philippines	7	7	0
2nd place, silver medalist(s)	Hong Kong	6	4	2
3rd place, bronze medalist(s)	Thailand	6	2	4
4	Singapore	7	3	4
5	Laos	4	2	2
6	Cambodia	5	2	3
7	Malaysia	5	0	5

Qualified for 2023 Asian Baseball Championship

Source: BFA

== See also ==
- 2023 West Asia Baseball Cup
