= Baseball at the Asian Games =

- Governing bodies: WBSC (World) / BFA (Asia)
- Events: 1 (men)

Games
- 1951; 1954; 1958; 1962; 1966; 1970; 1974; 1978; 1982; 1986; 1990; 1994; 1998; 2002; 2006; 2010; 2014; 2018; 2022; 2026; Demonstration sport years indicated in italics
- Medalists

Men's baseball made its first appearance as a demonstration sport at the 1990. Baseball became a full medal sport at the 1994 Asian Games in Hiroshima, Japan, and has been a sport in the games since then. International baseball in Asia is governed by the World Baseball Softball Confederation (WBSC) and the Baseball Federation of Asia (BFA).

The competition has been dominated by teams from Japan, South Korea and Chinese Taipei (Taiwan). South Korea is the most successful team by winning 6 gold medals.

== Summary ==
#	Year	Host	Final			Third place match			Teams
#	Year	Host	Winner	Score	Runner-up	3rd place	Score	4th place	Teams
1	1994	(Japan); Hiroshima	Japan	6–5	South Korea	Chinese Taipei	9–4	China	6
2	1998	(Thailand); Bangkok	South Korea	13–1 (F/7)	Japan	Chinese Taipei	10–6	China	6
3	2002	(South Korea); Busan	South Korea	4–3	Chinese Taipei	Japan	7–4	China	5
4	2006	(Qatar); Doha	Chinese Taipei	No playoffs	Japan	South Korea	No playoffs	China	6
5	2010	(China); Guangzhou	South Korea	9–3	Chinese Taipei	Japan	6–2	China	8
6	2014	(South Korea); Incheon	South Korea	6–3	Chinese Taipei	Japan	10–0 (F/7)	China	8
7	2018	(Indonesia); Jakarta–Palembang	South Korea	3–0	Japan	Chinese Taipei	10–0 (F/8)	China	10
8	2022	(China); Hangzhou	South Korea	2–0	Chinese Taipei	Japan	4–3	China	9
9	2026	(Japan); Aichi–Nagoya	South Korea	3–1	Japan	Chinese Taipei	5–1	China	8

== Medal table ==
Rank	Nation	Gold	Silver	Bronze	Total
1	South Korea (KOR)	7	1	1	9
2	Chinese Taipei (TPE)	1	4	4	9
2	Japan (JPN)	1	4	4	9
Totals (3 entries)		9	9	9	27

== Participating nations ==
Team	(China) 1990	(Japan) 1994	(Thailand) 1998	(South Korea) 2002	(Qatar) 2006	(China) 2010	(South Korea) 2014	(Indonesia) 2018	(China) 2022	(Japan) 2026	Years
China	4th	4th	4th	4th	4th	4th	4th	4th	4th	4th	10
Chinese Taipei	1st	3rd	3rd	2nd	1st	2nd	2nd	3rd	2nd	3rd	10
Hong Kong						7th	7th	6th	6th	7th	5
Indonesia								7th			1
Japan	3rd	1st	2nd	3rd	2nd	3rd	3rd	2nd	3rd	2nd	10
Laos								10th	8th		2
Mongolia		6th				7th	7th				3
Pakistan						5th	5th	5th			3
Palestine										8th	1
Philippines			5th	5th	6th				5th	5th	5
Singapore									9th		1
South Korea	2nd	2nd	1st	1st	3rd	1st	1st	1st	1st	1st	10
Sri Lanka								9th			1
Thailand		5th	6th		5th	5th	5th	8th	7th	6th	8
Teams (14)	4	6	6	5	6	8	8	10	9	8	_
