= Baseball at the 2025 SEA Games =

Tournament details
- Country: Thailand
- Dates: 5–14 December 2025
- Teams: 7 (baseball); 4 (Baseball5)
- Defending champions: Philippines (baseball); N/A (Baseball5)

Final positions
- Champions: Philippines (baseball; 4th title); Thailand (baseball5; 1st title)
- Runners-up: Thailand (baseball); Indonesia (baseball5)
- Third place: Indonesia (baseball); Malaysia (baseball5)
- Fourth place: Singapore (baseball); Vietnam (baseball5)

The baseball tournament at the 2025 Southeast Asian Games in Thailand is held at the Queen Sirikit's 60th Anniversary Stadium in Pathum Thani from 5 to 14 December 2025.

In addition to the standard men's baseball tournament, a coed Baseball5 tournament will also be held for the very first time in SEA Games history.

The Philippines won their fourth title in men's baseball. Thailand became the first-ever SEA Games Baseball5 champions.

== Participating nations ==
Nation	Men's baseball	Baseball5
Indonesia	Yes	Yes
Laos	Yes	No
Malaysia	Yes	Yes
Philippines	Yes	No
Singapore	Yes	No
Thailand	Yes	Yes
Vietnam	Yes	Yes
Total: 7 NOCs	7	4

== Competition schedule ==
The following is the competition schedule for the baseball competitions:

O	Opening round	B	3rd place play-off	F	Final

Date Event	Fri 5	Sat 6	Sun 7	Mon 8	Tue 9	Wed 10	Thu 11	Fri 12		Sat 13	Sun 14	
Men's baseball	O	O	O	O	O	O	O	B	F			
Baseball5							O	O		O	B	F

== Medalists ==
Event	Gold	Silver	Bronze
Men's tournament	Philippines (PHI): Jennald Pareja; Renato Samuel Jr.; Junmar Diarao; Mar Joseph Carolino; Kennedy Torres; John Reymond Vargas; Clarence Lyle Caasalan; Erwin Bosito; Juan Paulo Macasaet; Mark Steven Manaig; Romeo Jasmin Jr.; Liam Alexei De Vera; Cer Gio Gorpido; John Leonel Matanguhan; Mark John Philip Beronilla; Amiel De Guzman; Nigel Paule; Joshua Pineda; Razhley Santos; Joven Kenneth Maulit; Ferdinand Liguayan Jr.; James Vincent Nisnisan; Francis Thomas Gonzaga; Kent Joerend Altarejos	Thailand (THA): Oliver Graeme Dunn; Lungloek Anucha; Nattapon Chaichuay; Joseph Matthew Daru; Alexander Clark; Gabriel Pongsiri Buranasiri; Anuchit Lungloek; Yuri Kayanuma; Phuriphat Promma; Phanuwat Sukmuang; Linus Sunpet Oudom; Wissaroot Sihamat; Jake Jie Ren Chaisongkram; Phuttabut Petsunthad; Piyathat Saibuakaew; Thanakhit Saynongkham; Porrawit Wongsuwan; Yusuke Ryoto; Yuthai Ryoto; Anukul Sudswad; Pongsakorn Duangdang; Kamolphan Kanjanavisut; Putawan Singlor; Christopher Michael Conran Jr.	Indonesia (INA): Nanda Dwisaputra; Faldy Akhmad Zulfikar; I Gusti Lanang Agung Trianjana; Rawafi Yaputra Yanto Rozali; Andrew Putra Soetyono; I Gede Ricky Takahashi Suasta; Rizki Ramadhan; Aditya Muflih Mahmud; Aditya Aulia Rachman; Akbar Kurniawan Aminudin; Yana Gerhana; Nazrey Lazuardi; Diva Reza Fabil; Muhammad Ikbal; Rizki Jodiansyah Ramadhan; Muhammad Vendy Kurniawan; Muhammad Arrifqi Zavianda; Alexander Rudolf Aribowo; Narendra Bismo Nugroho; Ranjani Ranjani; Hadi Nur Muhammad; Ray Theodore Santoso; Rui Takahashi
Baseball5 tournament	Thailand (THA): Naruephol Muangkasem; Ancheera Sirimaha; Teetat Suwannasang; Sudarat Wiangkhamfa; Setthawut Bucha; Ramin Yalangkham; Nannapas Wattaprom; Kanyawan Sila	Indonesia (INA): Rafael McGuire Richardo; Kadek Sinta Dwi Maharani; Jaya Gustiar; Bachtiar Sanjaya; Rahma Delima Putri; Maria Judith; Nicole Astrella Hermanto; Muhammad Mahsa Wildanur	Malaysia (MAS): Elsa Chew; Iiman Iklil Dzul Karnain; Benncaawan Suwanmanie Samran; Nurin Liana Mohd Zan; Kunaalan Segar; Aiman Mustafa Albakri; Ng Guan Peng; Sin Zhi Cheng

== Men's baseball ==
=== Opening round ===
Pos	Team	Pld	W	L	RF	RA	RD	PCT	GB	Qualification
1	Philippines	6	6	0	93	11	+82	1.000	—	Gold medal match
2	Thailand (H)	6	5	1	68	17	+51	.833	1	Gold medal match
3	Indonesia	6	4	2	49	50	−1	.667	2	Bronze medal match
4	Singapore	6	3	3	57	58	−1	.500	3	Bronze medal match
5	Laos	6	2	4	30	46	−16	.333	4	
6	Vietnam	6	1	5	18	74	−56	.167	5	
7	Malaysia	6	0	6	17	76	−59	.000	6	

Source: WBSC
(H) Hosts

5 December; 10:00 (UTC+7)	Laos	1–13 (F/7)	Singapore	Sirikit Secondary Baseball Stadium, Pathum Thani
5 December; 10:00 (UTC+7)		Boxscore		Sirikit Secondary Baseball Stadium, Pathum Thani

5 December; 10:20 (UTC+7)	Indonesia	10–0 (F/7)	Malaysia	Sirikit Main Baseball Stadium, Pathum Thani
5 December; 10:20 (UTC+7)		Boxscore		Sirikit Main Baseball Stadium, Pathum Thani

5 December; 14:00 (UTC+7)	Thailand	16–0 (F/5)	Vietnam	Sirikit Main Baseball Stadium, Pathum Thani
5 December; 14:00 (UTC+7)		Boxscore		Sirikit Main Baseball Stadium, Pathum Thani

6 December; 9:30 (UTC+7)	Philippines	14–0 (F/7)	Indonesia	Sirikit Main Baseball Stadium, Pathum Thani
6 December; 9:30 (UTC+7)		Boxscore		Sirikit Main Baseball Stadium, Pathum Thani

6 December; 10:00 (UTC+7)	Malaysia	2–5	Vietnam	Sirikit Secondary Baseball Stadium, Pathum Thani
6 December; 10:00 (UTC+7)		Boxscore		Sirikit Secondary Baseball Stadium, Pathum Thani

6 December; 14:00 (UTC+7)	Laos	1–12 (F/7)	Thailand	Sirikit Main Baseball Stadium, Pathum Thani
6 December; 14:00 (UTC+7)		Boxscore		Sirikit Main Baseball Stadium, Pathum Thani

7 December; 9:30 (UTC+7)	Singapore	3–17 (F/7)	Philippines	Sirikit Main Baseball Stadium, Pathum Thani
7 December; 9:30 (UTC+7)		Boxscore		Sirikit Main Baseball Stadium, Pathum Thani

7 December; 10:00 (UTC+7)	Laos	16–0 (F/6)	Vietnam	Sirikit Secondary Baseball Stadium, Pathum Thani
7 December; 10:00 (UTC+7)		Boxscore		Sirikit Secondary Baseball Stadium, Pathum Thani

7 December; 14:00 (UTC+7)	Thailand	10–1	Indonesia	Sirikit Main Baseball Stadium, Pathum Thani
7 December; 14:00 (UTC+7)		Boxscore		Sirikit Main Baseball Stadium, Pathum Thani

8 December; 9:30 (UTC+7)	Indonesia	4–3	Laos	Sirikit Main Baseball Stadium, Pathum Thani
8 December; 9:30 (UTC+7)		Boxscore		Sirikit Main Baseball Stadium, Pathum Thani

8 December; 10:00 (UTC+7)	Singapore	19–12	Vietnam	Sirikit Secondary Baseball Stadium, Pathum Thani
8 December; 10:00 (UTC+7)		Boxscore		Sirikit Secondary Baseball Stadium, Pathum Thani

8 December; 14:00 (UTC+7)	Philippines	21–0 (F/5)	Malaysia	Sirikit Main Baseball Stadium, Pathum Thani
8 December; 14:00 (UTC+7)		Boxscore		Sirikit Main Baseball Stadium, Pathum Thani

9 December; 9:30 (UTC+7)	Vietnam	1–21 (F/7)	Philippines	Sirikit Main Baseball Stadium, Pathum Thani
9 December; 9:30 (UTC+7)		Boxscore		Sirikit Main Baseball Stadium, Pathum Thani

9 December; 10:00 (UTC+7)	Laos	9–5	Malaysia	Sirikit Secondary Baseball Stadium, Pathum Thani
9 December; 10:00 (UTC+7)		Boxscore		Sirikit Secondary Baseball Stadium, Pathum Thani

9 December; 14:00 (UTC+7)	Thailand	6–4	Singapore	Sirikit Main Baseball Stadium, Pathum Thani
9 December; 14:00 (UTC+7)		Boxscore		Sirikit Main Baseball Stadium, Pathum Thani

10 December; 9:30 (UTC+7)	Malaysia	7–14	Singapore	Sirikit Main Baseball Stadium, Pathum Thani
10 December; 9:30 (UTC+7)		Boxscore		Sirikit Main Baseball Stadium, Pathum Thani

10 December; 10:00 (UTC+7)	Indonesia	19–3 (F/5)	Vietnam	Sirikit Secondary Baseball Stadium, Pathum Thani
10 December; 10:00 (UTC+7)		Boxscore		Sirikit Secondary Baseball Stadium, Pathum Thani

10 December; 14:00 (UTC+7)	Philippines	8–7 (F/10)	Thailand	Sirikit Main Baseball Stadium, Pathum Thani
10 December; 14:00 (UTC+7)		Boxscore		Sirikit Main Baseball Stadium, Pathum Thani

11 December; 9:30 (UTC+7)	Singapore	4–15 (F/7)	Indonesia	Sirikit Main Baseball Stadium, Pathum Thani
11 December; 9:30 (UTC+7)		Boxscore		Sirikit Main Baseball Stadium, Pathum Thani

11 December; 10:00 (UTC+7)	Laos	0–12 (F/7)	Philippines	Sirikit Secondary Baseball Stadium, Pathum Thani
11 December; 10:00 (UTC+7)		Boxscore		Sirikit Secondary Baseball Stadium, Pathum Thani

11 December; 14:00 (UTC+7)	Thailand	17–3 (F/7)	Malaysia	Sirikit Main Baseball Stadium, Pathum Thani
11 December; 14:00 (UTC+7)		Boxscore		Sirikit Main Baseball Stadium, Pathum Thani

=== Medal round ===
==== Bronze medal game ====
12 December; 9:30 (UTC+9)	Indonesia	10–9 (F/10)	Singapore	Sirikit Secondary Baseball Stadium, Pathum Thani
12 December; 9:30 (UTC+9)		Boxscore		Sirikit Secondary Baseball Stadium, Pathum Thani

==== Gold medal game ====
12 December; 12:00 (UTC+9)	Philippines	5–3	Thailand	Sirikit Main Baseball Stadium, Pathum Thani
12 December; 12:00 (UTC+9)		Boxscore		Sirikit Main Baseball Stadium, Pathum Thani

== Baseball5 ==
=== Opening round ===
Pos	Team	Pld	W	L	RF	RA	RD	PCT	GB	Qualification
1	Thailand (H)	3	3	0	84	26	+58	1.000	—	Gold medal match
2	Indonesia	3	2	1	34	33	+1	.667	1	Gold medal match
3	Malaysia	3	1	2	52	37	+15	.333	2	Bronze medal match
4	Vietnam	3	0	3	2	76	−74	.000	3	Bronze medal match

Source: WBSC
(H) Hosts

11 December; 10:00 (UTC+7)	Malaysia	0–2 (4–5, 4–5)	Indonesia	Indoor Stadium Huamark, Bangkok
11 December; 10:00 (UTC+7)		Boxscore		Indoor Stadium Huamark, Bangkok

11 December; 12:00 (UTC+9)	Thailand	2–0 (0–0, 0–0)	Vietnam	Indoor Stadium Huamark, Bangkok
11 December; 12:00 (UTC+9)		Boxscore		Indoor Stadium Huamark, Bangkok

12 December; 10:00 (UTC+7)	Thailand	2–0 (17–2, 15–0)	Malaysia	Indoor Stadium Huamark, Bangkok
12 December; 10:00 (UTC+7)		Boxscore		Indoor Stadium Huamark, Bangkok

12 December; 12:00 (UTC+7)	Vietnam	0–2 (0–15, 0–6)	Indonesia	Indoor Stadium Huamark, Bangkok
12 December; 12:00 (UTC+7)		Boxscore		Indoor Stadium Huamark, Bangkok

13 December; 10:00 (UTC+7)	Indonesia	0–2 (0–13, 3–8)	Thailand	Indoor Stadium Huamark, Bangkok
13 December; 10:00 (UTC+7)		Boxscore		Indoor Stadium Huamark, Bangkok

13 December; 12:00 (UTC+7)	Malaysia	2–0 (15–0, 8–0)	Vietnam	Indoor Stadium Huamark, Bangkok
13 December; 12:00 (UTC+7)		Boxscore		Indoor Stadium Huamark, Bangkok

=== Medal round ===
==== Bronze medal game ====
14 December; 10:00 (UTC+9)	Malaysia	2–0 (9–0, 4–3)	Vietnam	Indoor Stadium Huamark, Bangkok
14 December; 10:00 (UTC+9)		Boxscore		Indoor Stadium Huamark, Bangkok

==== Gold medal game ====
14 December; 12:00 (UTC+9)	Thailand	2–0 (9–8, 4–2)	Indonesia	Indoor Stadium Huamark, Bangkok
14 December; 12:00 (UTC+9)		Boxscore		Indoor Stadium Huamark, Bangkok
