= 2024 East Asia Baseball Cup =

- Event logo

Tournament details
- Country: Philippines
- City: Mabalacat
- Venues: 2 (in 1 host city)
- Dates: October 29 – November 4
- Teams: 7

Final positions
- Champions: Philippines (5th title)
- Runners-up: Hong Kong
- Third place: Thailand
- Fourth place: Singapore

Tournament statistics
- Games played: 17
- Attendance: 2,894 (170 per game)

The 2024 East Asian Baseball Cup is the 14th edition of the tournament, held from October 29 to November 4, 2024, at The Villages Sports Complex at the Clark Freeport Zone in Mabalacat, Pampanga, Philippines. The hosting rights were awarded in May 2024.

Hosts Philippines are the defending champions, and went on to win their fifth straight title.

== Participants ==
- Cambodia
- Hong Kong (32)
- Indonesia
- Malaysia
- Philippines (27)
- Singapore (60)
- Thailand (40)

Rankings as of September 18, 2024

== Results ==
=== First round ===
==== Group A ====
Pos	Team	Pld	W	L	RF	RA	PCT	GB	Qualification
1	Hong Kong	3	3	0	28	3	1.000	—	Super Round
2	Thailand	3	2	1	45	11	.667	1	Super Round
3	Malaysia	3	1	2	13	55	.333	2	Placement Round
4	Cambodia	3	0	3	14	31	.000	3	Placement Round

Source: WBSC Asia

October 29; 9:00	Malaysia	1–16 (F/5)	Hong Kong	The Villages Sports Complex Stadium 2, Mabalacat; Attendance: 152
October 29; 9:00		Box		The Villages Sports Complex Stadium 2, Mabalacat; Attendance: 152

October 29; 13:30	Thailand	14–4 (F/7)	Cambodia	The Villages Sports Complex Stadium 2, Mabalacat; Attendance: 78
October 29; 13:30		Box		The Villages Sports Complex Stadium 2, Mabalacat; Attendance: 78

October 30; 9:00	Hong Kong	5–2	Cambodia	The Villages Sports Complex Stadium 1, Mabalacat; Attendance: 102
October 30; 9:00		Box		The Villages Sports Complex Stadium 1, Mabalacat; Attendance: 102

October 30; 13:30	Thailand	31–0 (F/5)	Malaysia	The Villages Sports Complex Stadium 2, Mabalacat; Attendance: 100
October 30; 13:30		Box		The Villages Sports Complex Stadium 2, Mabalacat; Attendance: 100

October 31; 9:00	Hong Kong	7–0	Thailand	The Villages Sports Complex Stadium 1, Mabalacat; Attendance: 96
October 31; 9:00		Box		The Villages Sports Complex Stadium 1, Mabalacat; Attendance: 96

October 31; 13:30	Cambodia	8–12	Malaysia	The Villages Sports Complex Stadium 2, Mabalacat; Attendance: 88
October 31; 13:30		Box		The Villages Sports Complex Stadium 2, Mabalacat; Attendance: 88

==== Group B ====
Pos	Team	Pld	W	L	RF	RA	PCT	GB	Qualification
1	Philippines (H)	2	2	0	28	1	1.000	—	Super Round
2	Singapore	2	1	1	11	24	.500	1	Super Round
3	Indonesia	2	0	2	10	24	.000	2	Placement Round

Source: WBSC Asia
(H) Hosts

October 29; 13:30	Philippines	13–1 (F/7)	Indonesia	The Villages Sports Complex Stadium 1, Mabalacat; Attendance: 401
October 29; 13:30		Box		The Villages Sports Complex Stadium 1, Mabalacat; Attendance: 401

October 30; 13:30	Singapore	0–15 (F/5)	Philippines	The Villages Sports Complex Stadium 1, Mabalacat; Attendance: 194
October 30; 13:30		Box		The Villages Sports Complex Stadium 1, Mabalacat; Attendance: 194

October 31; 13:30	Indonesia	9–11	Singapore	The Villages Sports Complex Stadium 2, Mabalacat; Attendance: 87
October 31; 13:30		Box		The Villages Sports Complex Stadium 2, Mabalacat; Attendance: 87

=== Final stage ===
==== Placement round ====
Pos	Team	Pld	W	L	RF	RA	PCT
5	Indonesia	2	2	0	36	5	1.000
6	Malaysia	2	1	1	16	22	.500
7	Cambodia	2	0	2	9	34	.000

Source: WBSC Asia

November 1; 13:30	Indonesia	22–1 (F/5)	Cambodia	The Villages Sports Complex Stadium 2, Mabalacat; Attendance: 52
November 1; 13:30		Boxscore		The Villages Sports Complex Stadium 2, Mabalacat; Attendance: 52

November 2; 13:30	Malaysia	4–14	Indonesia	The Villages Sports Complex Stadium 2, Mabalacat; Attendance: 53
November 2; 13:30		Boxscore		The Villages Sports Complex Stadium 2, Mabalacat; Attendance: 53

==== Super round ====
Pos	Team	Pld	W	L	RF	RA	PCT	GB	Qualification
1	Philippines (H)	3	3	0	28	7	1.000	—	Gold Medal
2	Hong Kong	3	2	1	23	8	.667	1	Gold Medal
3	Thailand	3	1	2	15	19	.333	2	Bronze Medal
4	Singapore	3	0	3	7	39	.000	3	Bronze Medal

Source: WBSC Asia
(H) Hosts

November 1; 9:00	Hong Kong	14–4 (F/7)	Singapore	The Villages Sports Complex Stadium 1, Mabalacat; Attendance: 62
November 1; 9:00		Boxscore		The Villages Sports Complex Stadium 1, Mabalacat; Attendance: 62

November 1; 13:30	Philippines	9–5	Thailand	The Villages Sports Complex Stadium 1, Mabalacat; Attendance: 208
November 1; 13:30		Boxscore		The Villages Sports Complex Stadium 1, Mabalacat; Attendance: 208

November 2; 9:00	Thailand	10–3	Singapore	The Villages Sports Complex Stadium 1, Mabalacat; Attendance: 75
November 2; 9:00		Boxscore		The Villages Sports Complex Stadium 1, Mabalacat; Attendance: 75

November 2; 13:30	Hong Kong	2–4	Philippines	The Villages Sports Complex Stadium 1, Mabalacat; Attendance: 487
November 2; 13:30		Boxscore		The Villages Sports Complex Stadium 1, Mabalacat; Attendance: 487

==== Bronze medal game ====
November 3; 10:00	Thailand	11–10	Singapore	The Villages Sports Complex Stadium 1, Mabalacat; Attendance: 71
November 3; 10:00		Boxscore		The Villages Sports Complex Stadium 1, Mabalacat; Attendance: 71

Team	1	2	3	4	5	6	7	8	9	R	H	E
Singapore	3	0	0	0	3	0	0	0	4	10	11	4
Thailand	0	0	1	1	0	0	0	3	6	11	14	3

==== Gold medal game ====
November 3; 11:00	Philippines	9–2	Hong Kong	The Villages Sports Complex Stadium 1, Mabalacat; Attendance: 588
November 3; 11:00		Boxscore		The Villages Sports Complex Stadium 1, Mabalacat; Attendance: 588

Team	1	2	3	4	5	6	7	8	9	R	H	E
Hong Kong	0	0	0	0	1	0	0	1	0	2	9	0
Philippines	1	1	0	0	1	1	0	5	X	9	16	0

== Final standings ==
Rank	Team	Pld	W	L
1st place, gold medalist(s)	Philippines	5	5	0
2nd place, silver medalist(s)	Hong Kong	6	4	2
3rd place, bronze medalist(s)	Thailand	6	4	2
4	Singapore	5	1	4
5	Indonesia	4	2	2
6	Malaysia	4	1	3
7	Cambodia	4	0	4

2024 East Asia Baseball Cup champions

Philippines
Fifth title

Source: WBSC

== Awards ==
Individual

- Most Valuable Player – (Philippines) Romeo Jasmin
- Leading hitter – (Hong Kong) Jordan Wen Tsz Yin
- Pitcher best era – (Hong Kong) Oscar Cheng
- Pitcher best win/loss average – (Malaysia) Wan Nazirul Wan Nazri
- Most stolen base – (Philippines) Kyle Soberano
- Most runs batted-in – (Hong Kong) Andy Ho Lam Lo
- Most home runs – (Philippines) Kyle Soberano
- Most runs scored – (Philippines) John Vargas
- Most outstanding defensive player – (Philippines) Lord de Vera

Source: WBSC

All-Star team

Position	Player
SP	(Hong Kong) Oscar Cheng
RP	(Philippines) Clarence Caasalan
C	(Philippines) Steven Manaig
1B	(Singapore) Ryota Wong
2B	(Hong Kong) Chan Cheuk Kiu
3B	(Philippines) Clarence Caasalan
SS	(Philippines) Lord de Vera
OF	(Thailand) Yuthai Ryoto
OF	(Hong Kong) Jordan Wen Tsz Yin
OF	(Philippines) John Vargas
DH	(Hong Kong) Andy Ho Lam Lo

Source: WBSC
