= Laos national baseball team =

Information
- Country: Laos
- Federation: Lao Baseball Federation
- Confederation: WBSC Asia

WBSC ranking
- Current: 57 ▲2 (26 October 2026)
- Highest: 47 (first in November 2023)
- Lowest: 83 (first in March 2023)

Asian Games
- Appearances: 2 (first in 2018)
- Best result: Second stage (2022)

The Laos national baseball team represents Laos in international-level baseball competitions. Baseball was first introduced in the country in 2012, with the national team being founded two years later. Laos made its international debut at the 2018 Asian Games, with the Lao Baseball Federation officially recognized by the World Baseball Softball Confederation the following year.

== History ==
=== Beginnings ===
The origins of baseball in Laos can be traced back to March 2012, when Je Sung-uk, a Korean missionary, first arrived in the country. The following year, he had amassed a team of ten men interested in playing the sport in the capital city of Vientiane. During this time, Je contacted SK Wyverns head coach and former all-star KBO player Lee Man-soo, asking him to visit Laos and help teach children to play baseball. Lee initially declined the offer, saying he'd visit "someday", sending donations of money and equipment in lieu of visiting. When he was let go by the Wyverns in 2014, Lee traveled to Laos two days later and helped Je recruit players. That same year, the two men founded the Lao Baseball Association and held auditions for the national team, narrowing a field of several hundred prospects to a final roster of 40, which became Laos' first national team.

In 2019, the Lao Baseball Federation was officially recognized by the World Baseball Softball Confederation. In April of that year, the National Olympic Committee of Laos approved the construction of a baseball stadium in the country, with work starting in June, funded partly through Korean business donations and personal contributions from Je and Lee. Prior, the team rented out soccer fields to practice on. Players on the national team even helped construct the stadium in order to save on costs. Sapphavisa Stadium officially opened in Vientiane in November, allowing for the first ever baseball league to be established within the nation.

=== International competition ===
The team made its international debut at the 2018 Asian Games in Jakarta, Indonesia. In the first stage, they lost to Thailand by a score of 0–15 and to Sri Lanka by a score of 10–15. With these two losses, Laos finished last in the field of ten at these Games.

They improved upon this performance at the 2023 East Asian Baseball Cup in Pathum Thani, Thailand. Despite dropping their first two group stage matches against Hong Kong and Thailand by scores of 0–18 and 0–12, respectively, they won their two placement round games, defeating Cambodia 9–0 and Malaysia 13–1, bringing Laos their first wins in a major international competition and leading them to a 5th place finish in the tournament. Further, starting pitcher Khounchaleun Soulapixu, who pitched the shutout win against Cambodia, was named the best starting pitcher of the tournament.

Four months later, they competed at the 2022 Asian Games in Shaoxing, China. (Note: Despite being listed as the 2022 Asian Games, the Games took place from 23 September to 8 October 2023, due to the COVID-19 pandemic in China.) Starting the first stage with a 1–4 loss to Thailand, they defeated Singapore 8–7 to advance to the second stage, where they were beaten 0–15 by China, 0–18 by Japan, and 0–7 by the Philippines. In the placement round, the loss over the Philippines counted as their head-to-head, while Laos then dropped games to Thailand and Hong Kong by scores of 0–6 and 0–11, respectively. With this performance, Laos finished eighth in a field of nine.

== International tournament results ==
=== SEA Games ===
SEA Games
Year	Round	Position	Pld	W	L	RS	RA
(Thailand) 2025	Preliminary	5th Place	6	2	4	30	46
Total			6	2	4	30	46

== Fixtures and results ==
=== 2018 ===
Asian Games R1	21 August 2018	Thailand	15–0 (F/6)	Laos	Gelora Bung Karno Sports Complex, Jakarta, Indonesia
Asian Games R1	14:00 ICT	WP: Phanuwat Sukmuang; HR: Naruephol Muangkasem		LP: Phithak Hopkhop

Asian Games R1	22 August 2018	Laos	10–15	Sri Lanka	Gelora Bung Karno Sports Complex, Jakarta, Indonesia
Asian Games R1	14:00 ICT	LP: Cola Phouangkeo; HR: Nalor Gniatou		LP: Chirath Karunarathne

=== 2023 ===
East Asian Cup GS	30 April 2023	Laos	0–18 (F/5)	Hong Kong	Queen Sirikit's 60th Anniversary Stadium, Pathum Thani, Thailand
East Asian Cup GS	13:00 ICT	LP: Lao Deng	Boxscore	WP: Chung-Hei Leung

East Asian Cup GS	1 May 2023	Thailand	12–0 (F/7)	Laos	Queen Sirikit's 60th Anniversary Stadium, Pathum Thani, Thailand
East Asian Cup GS	13:00 ICT	WP: Nadee Siraphop	Boxscore	LP: Hue Thor

East Asian Cup PR	2 May 2023	Cambodia	0–9	Laos	Queen Sirikit's 60th Anniversary Stadium, Pathum Thani, Thailand
East Asian Cup PR	09:00 ICT	LP: Netra Phon	Boxscore	WP: Khounchaleun Soulapixu

East Asian Cup PR	3 May 2023	Malaysia	1–13 (F/7)	Laos	Queen Sirikit's 60th Anniversary Stadium, Pathum Thani, Thailand
East Asian Cup PR	09:00 ICT	LP: Abdullah Sani Mlh	Boxscore	WP: Herpaoyang Youtthasat

Asian Games FS	26 September 2023	Laos	1–4	Thailand	Baseball and Softball Sports Culture Center, Shaoxing, China
Asian Games FS	18:30 CST	LP: Chuevakham Mung	Boxscore	WP: Nadee Siraphop; Sv: Kevin Kawin Irwin

Asian Games FS	27 September 2023	Singapore	7–8	Laos	Baseball and Softball Sports Culture Center, Shaoxing, China
Asian Games FS	18:30 CST	LP: Eleazar Jie Xian Ng	Boxscore	WP: Hue Thor

Asian Games SS	1 October 2023	Laos	0–15 (F/5)	China	Baseball and Softball Sports Culture Center, Shaoxing, China
Asian Games SS	12:00 CST	LP: To Tava	Boxscore	WP: Su Changlong

Asian Games SS	2 October 2023	Laos	0–18 (F/5)	Japan	Baseball and Softball Sports Culture Center, Shaoxing, China
Asian Games SS	18:30 CST	LP: Soulapixa Khounchaleun	Boxscore	WP: Kisho Iwamoto; Sv: Yoshiki Fuchigami

Asian Games SS	3 October 2023	Philippines	7–0	Laos	Baseball and Softball Sports Culture Center, Shaoxing, China
Asian Games SS	18:30 CST	WP: Raymond Nerosa	Boxscore	LP: Mung Chuevakham

Asian Games PR	5 October 2023	Laos	0–6	Thailand	Baseball and Softball Sports Culture Center, Shaoxing, China
Asian Games PR	12:00 CST	LP: Yayua Wa	Boxscore	WP: Phoomwut Wutthikorn

Asian Games PR	6 October 2023	Laos	0–11 (F/7)	Hong Kong	Baseball and Softball Sports Culture Center, Shaoxing, China
Asian Games PR	18:30 CST	LP: Mung Chuevakham	Boxscore	WP: Sam Leung; HR: York Sze
