= 2010 Asian Baseball Cup =

Tournament details
- Country: Pakistan
- City: Islamabad
- Dates: May 19–24
- Teams: 4

The 2010 Asia Baseball Cup was held in the city of Islamabad, Pakistan, from May 19 to May 24, 2010. The tournament acted as a qualifier for the 2010 Asian Games.

== Format and participation ==
The tournament was downsized from eight to four participant teams, India, Sri Lanka, Iran and Iraq were not able to compete for various reasons. Pakistan won the tournament at the end of round robin play.

== Standings ==
Teams	W	L	Pct.	GB	R	RA
Pakistan	3	0	1.000	—	37	7
Hong Kong	2	1	.667	1	32	13
Thailand	1	2	.333	2	17	23
Afghanistan	0	3	.000	3	4	47

2010 Asia Baseball Cup champions

Pakistan
