= Thailand national baseball team =

Information
- Country: Thailand
- Federation: Baseball Association of Thailand
- Confederation: Baseball Federation of Asia
- Manager: Pipat Hongsrisuwan

WBSC ranking
- Current: 30 (26 March 2026)
- Highest: 23 (31 December 2012)
- Lowest: 79 (28 March 2023)

Asian Games
- Appearances: 5 (first in 1994)
- Best result: 5th (4 times, most recent in 2014)

Asian Championship
- Appearances: 3 (first in 1997)
- Best result: 5th (in 2007)

The Thailand national baseball team is the national baseball team of Thailand. They have competed in numerous international competitions, including the Southeast Asian Games, the Asian Games, and the Baseball World Cup. The team is organized by the Baseball Association of Thailand (BBAT).

In 2007 the Thailand national baseball team won the Southeast Asian Games and they finished third in the 2011 Southeast Asian Games. The Thailand national team competed in the World Baseball Classic qualifiers in the fall of 2012.

Johnny Damon, active until 2012, was the only Major League Baseball player to play for the Thailand national team, appearing in the 2013 World Baseball Classic qualifiers.

As of July 2025, Thailand's men's team was ranked No. 31 by the World Baseball Softball Confederation. In women's baseball, Thailand is ranked No. 17.

== International tournament results ==
=== World Baseball Classic ===
| World Baseball Classic record | | | | | | | Qualification record | | | |
| Year | Round | Position | W | L | RS | RA | W | L | RS | RA |
|---|---|---|---|---|---|---|---|---|---|---|
| 2006 | did not enter | | | | | | No qualifiers held | | | |
| 2009 | did not enter | | | | | | No qualifiers held | | | |
| 2013 | did not qualify | | | | | | 0 | 2 | 4 | 20 |
| 2017 | did not enter | | | | | | did not enter | | | |
| 2023 | did not enter | | | | | | did not enter | | | |
| 2026 | did not enter | | | | | | did not enter | | | |
| Total | - | 0/6 | - | - | - | - | 0 | 2 | 4 | 20 |

Thailand World Baseball Classic Qualifiers record
| Opponent | Tournaments met | W-L record | Largest victory | | Largest defeat | | Current streak |
| Opponent | Tournaments met | W-L record | Score | Tournament | Score | Tournament | Current streak |
|---|---|---|---|---|---|---|---|
| New Zealand | 1 | 0-1 | – | | 12–2 (F/8) | Taiwan 2013 | L1 |
| Philippines | 1 | 0-1 | – | | 8–2 | Taiwan 2013 | L1 |
| Overall | 1 | 0–2 | – | | Against NZL | | L2 |
| Overall | 1 | 0–2 | – | | 12–2 (F/8) | Taiwan 2013 | L2 |

=== Asian Games ===
Asian Games record
| Year | Result | Rank | W | L | RS | RA |
|---|---|---|---|---|---|---|
| (Japan) 1994 | Preliminary Round | 5th | 1 | 2 | 23 | 44 |
| (Thailand) 1998 | Preliminary Round | 6th | 1 | 3 | 19 | 57 |
| (South Korea) 2002 | did not participate | | | | | |
| (Qatar) 2006 | Preliminary Round | 5th | 1 | 4 | 10 | 39 |
| (China) 2010 | Preliminary Round | 5th | 1 | 2 | 25 | 25 |
| (South Korea) 2014 | Preliminary Round | 5th | 1 | 2 | 14 | 35 |
| (Indonesia) 2018 | Consolation Round | 8th | 2 | 5 | 46 | 75 |
| (China) 2022 | Placement Round | 7th | 3 | 4 | 29 | 57 |
| (Japan) 2026 | Placement Round | 6th | 2 | 3 | 19 | 58 |
| Total | | | 12 | 25 | 185 | 390 |

=== SEA Games ===
SEA Games record
| Year | Result | Pos | Pld | W | L | RS | RA |
|---|---|---|---|---|---|---|---|
| (Philippines) 2005 | Runners Up | 2nd | 6 | 4 | 2 | 56 | 32 |
| (Thailand) 2007 | Winner | 1st | 5 | 5 | 0 | 67 | 6 |
| (Indonesia) 2011 | Third Place | 3rd | 4 | 2 | 2 | 35 | 14 |
| (Philippines) 2019 | Runners Up | 2nd | 5 | 3 | 2 | 36 | 29 |
| (Thailand) 2025 | Runners Up | 2nd | 7 | 5 | 2 | 71 | 22 |
| Total | 1 Title | 5/5 | 27 | 19 | 8 | 265 | 103 |

=== Asia Baseball Cup ===
- 1995 : (silver) 2nd
- 1997 : (gold) 1st
- 1999 : did not participate
- 2001 : (bronze) 3rd
- 2002 : (bronze) 3rd
- 2004 : (gold) 1st
- 2006 : (bronze) 3rd
- 2009 : 5th
- 2010 : (bronze) 3rd

=== East Asia Baseball Cup ===
- 2012 : (silver) 2nd
- 2015 : 5th
- 2017 : (silver) 2rd
- 2023 : (bronze) 3rd
- 2024 : (bronze) 3rd

== Results and fixtures ==
The following is a list of professional baseball match results currently active in the latest version of the WBSC World Rankings, as well as any future matches that have been scheduled.

=== 2019 ===
| Group Stage | 2 December 2019 | Philippines | 3–2 | Thailand | Clark International Sports Complex, Angeles, Philippines |
| Group Stage | 13:00 PHT |

| Group Stage | 3 December 2019 | Thailand | 12–7 | Singapore | Clark International Sports Complex, Angeles, Philippines |
| Group Stage | 11:00 PHT |

| Group Stage | 6 December 2019 | Thailand | 14–0 | Cambodia | Clark International Sports Complex, Angeles, Philippines |
| Group Stage | 11:00 PHT |

| Group Stage | 7 December 2019 | Indonesia | 4–6 | Thailand | Clark International Sports Complex, Angeles, Philippines |
| Group Stage | 13:00 PHT |

| Final | 8 December 2019 | Philippines | 15–2 | Thailand | Clark International Sports Complex, Angeles, Philippines |
| Final | 13:00 PHT |

=== 2023 ===
| East Asian Cup GS | 29 April | Hong Kong | 15–8 | Thailand | Queen Sirikit's 60th Anniversary Stadium, Thailand |
| East Asian Cup GS | 13:30 ICT | | [Box Boxscore] |

| East Asian Cup GS | 1 May | Thailand | 12–0 | Laos | Queen Sirikit's 60th Anniversary Stadium, Thailand |
| East Asian Cup GS | 13:00 ICT | | Boxscore |

| East Asian Cup SR | 2 May | Thailand | 4–12 | Philippines | Queen Sirikit's 60th Anniversary Stadium, Thailand |
| East Asian Cup SR | 9:00 ICT | | Boxscore |

| East Asian Cup SR | 3 May | Singapore | 0–10 | Thailand | Queen Sirikit's 60th Anniversary Stadium, Thailand |
| East Asian Cup SR | 16:00 ICT | | Boxscore |

| East Asian Cup 3rd | 4 May | Thailand | 13–0 (F/7) | Singapore | Queen Sirikit's 60th Anniversary Stadium, Thailand |
| East Asian Cup 3rd | 9:00 ICT | | Boxscore |

| Asian Games R1 | 26 September | Laos | 1–4 | Thailand | Shaoxing Baseball and Softball Sports Center, China |
| Asian Games R1 | 18:30 CST | | Boxscore |

| Asian Games R1 | 28 September | Thailand | 17–0 (F/7) | Singapore | Shaoxing Baseball and Softball Sports Center, China |
| Asian Games R1 | 18:30 CST | | Boxscore |

| Asian Games GS | 1 October | Thailand | 1–12 (F/7) | Chinese Taipei | Shaoxing Baseball and Softball Sports Center, China |
| Asian Games GS | 18:30 CST | | Boxscore |

| Asian Games GS | 2 October | Hong Kong | 8–0 | Thailand | Shaoxing Baseball and Softball Sports Center, China |
| Asian Games GS | 12:00 CST | | Boxscore |

| Asian Games GS | 3 October | Thailand | 0–17 (F/5) | South Korea | Shaoxing Baseball and Softball Sports Center, China |
| Asian Games GS | 12:00 CST | | Boxscore |

| Asian Games PR | 5 October | Laos | 0–6 | Thailand | Shaoxing Baseball and Softball Sports Center, China |
| Asian Games PR | 12:00 CST | | Boxscore |

| Asian Games PR | 6 October | Thailand | 1–11 (F/8) | Philippines | Shaoxing Baseball and Softball Sports Center, China |
| Asian Games PR | 12:00 CST | | Boxscore |

| Asian Championship GS | 4 December | Thailand | 4–14 (F/7) | Philippines | Taipei Dome, Taiwan |
| Asian Championship GS | 12:30 NST | | Boxscore | | Attendance: 1,422 |

| Asian Championship GS | 5 December | Japan | 16–0 (F/5) | Thailand | Taipei Dome, Taiwan |
| Asian Championship GS | 18:30 NST | | Boxscore | | Attendance: 6,614 |

| Asian Championship GS | 6 December | Thailand | 1–4 | Pakistan | Taipei Dome, Taiwan |
| Asian Championship GS | 12:30 NST | | Boxscore | | Attendance: 2,004 |

| Asian Championship PR | 8 December | Hong Kong | 12–10 | Thailand | Xinzhuang Baseball Stadium, Taiwan |
| Asian Championship PR | 12:30 NST | | Boxscore | | Attendance: 41 |

| Asian Championship PR | 9 December | Thailand | 0–4 | Palestine | Xinzhuang Baseball Stadium, Taiwan |
| Asian Championship PR | 18:30 NST | | Boxscore | | Attendance: 100 |

=== 2024 ===
| East Asia Cup GS | 29 October | Thailand | 14–4 (F/7) | Cambodia | Clark International Sports Complex, Philippines |
| East Asia Cup GS | 13:30 PST | | Boxscore |

| East Asia Cup GS | 30 October | Thailand | 31–0 (F/5) | Malaysia | Clark International Sports Complex, Philippines |
| East Asia Cup GS | 13:30 PST | | Boxscore |

| East Asia Cup SR | 31 October | Hong Kong | 7–0 | Thailand | Clark International Sports Complex, Philippines |
| East Asia Cup SR | 9:00 PST | | Boxscore |

| East Asia Cup SR | 1 November | Philippines | 9–5 | Thailand | Clark International Sports Complex, Philippines |
| East Asia Cup SR | 13:30 PST | | Boxscore |

| East Asia Cup SR | 2 November | Thailand | 10–3 | Singapore | Clark International Sports Complex, Philippines |
| East Asia Cup SR | 9:00 PST | | Boxscore |

| East Asia Cup 3rd | 3 November | Singapore | 10–11 | Thailand | Clark International Sports Complex, Philippines |
| East Asia Cup 3rd | 10:00 PST | | Boxscore |

=== 2025 ===
| Friendly | 23 May | Laos | 10–4 | Thailand | New Laos National Stadium, Laos |

| Friendly | 24 May | Thailand | 2–11 | Singapore | New Laos National Stadium, Laos |

| Friendly | 25 May | Thailand | 1–6 | Laos | New Laos National Stadium, Laos |

| SEA Games | 5 December | Thailand | 16–0 (F/5) | Vietnam | Queen Sirikit's 60th Anniversary Stadium, Thailand |
| SEA Games | 14:00 ICT |

| SEA Games | 6 December | Laos | 1–12 (F/7) | Thailand | Queen Sirikit's 60th Anniversary Stadium, Thailand |
| SEA Games | 14:00 ICT |

| SEA Games | 7 December | Thailand | 10–1 | Indonesia | Queen Sirikit's 60th Anniversary Stadium, Thailand |
| SEA Games | 14:00 ICT |

| SEA Games | 9 December | Thailand | 6–4 | Singapore | Queen Sirikit's 60th Anniversary Stadium, Thailand |
| SEA Games | 14:00 ICT |

| SEA Games | 10 December | Philippines | 8–7 (F/10) | Thailand | Queen Sirikit's 60th Anniversary Stadium, Thailand |
| SEA Games | 14:00 ICT |

| SEA Games | 11 December | Thailand | 17–3 (F/7) | Malaysia | Queen Sirikit's 60th Anniversary Stadium, Thailand |
| SEA Games | 14:00 ICT |

| SEA Games | 12 December | Philippines | 5–3 | Thailand | Queen Sirikit's 60th Anniversary Stadium, Thailand |
| SEA Games | 14:00 ICT |

=== 2026 ===
| Asian Games | 21 September | Thailand | 10–7 | Hong Kong | Okazaki Central Park Baseball Stadium, Japan |
| Asian Games | 12:00 JST | | | | Attendance: 1,568 |

| Asian Games | 22 September | Chinese Taipei | 0–15 (F/6) | Thailand | Okazaki Central Park Baseball Stadium, Japan |
| Asian Games | 18:30 CST |

| Asian Games | 23 September | South Korea | 1–18 (F/5) | Thailand | Okazaki Central Park Baseball Stadium, Japan |
| Asian Games | 10:00 JST |

| Asian Games | 25 September | Thailand | 7–18 (F/7) | Philippines | Okazaki Central Park Baseball Stadium, Japan |
| Asian Games | 12:00 JST |

| Asian Games | 26 September | Thailand | 1–0 (F/10) | Palestine | Okazaki Central Park Baseball Stadium, Japan |
| Asian Games | 12:00 JST |

== Current roster ==
Thailand – 2026 Asian Games roster
| Players | | Coaches |
| Pitchers: 3 Ryan Thamakit Kehoe; 16 Phuriphat Phromma; 17 Suppakorn Lin; 88 Jiraphat Saengnak; 18 Linus Sunpet Oudom; 13 Gabriel Pongsiri Buranasiri; 15 Kayanuma Yuri; 7 Nattapat Uamwilai | Catchers: 4 Anuchit Lunglerk; 19 Nanthawat Maneesiri; 29 Yusuke Ryoto; Infielders: 2 Oliver Dunn; 22 Jake Chaisongkram; 28 Porrawit Wongsuwan (Tyler Webster); 8 Alexander Clark; 4 Anucha Lunglerk; 23 Phuttabut Petchsantat; 25 Piyathat Saibuakaew; 5 Nattapon Chaichuay; 1 Naruephol Muangkasem; 10 Teetat Suwannasang; 27 Phongsathon Nituthon; Outfielders: 32 Yuthai Ryoto; 6 Joe Daru; 14 Setthawut Bucha; 28 Porrawit Wongsuwan | Manager: 49 Pipat Hongsrisuwan; Coaches: 88 Somsak Sanwit; 56 Shin Nakayama; 63 Anukul Suksawat; 34 Jesada Toobkerd |

== See also ==
- Thailand women's national baseball team
- Thailand national Baseball5 team
- Baseball Association of Thailand
- Baseball in Thailand
