= Baseball at the 2019 SEA Games =

Tournament details
- Country: Philippines
- Dates: 2-8 December
- Teams: 5
- Defending champions: Philippines

Final positions
- Champions: Philippines (3rd title)
- Runners-up: Thailand
- Third place: Indonesia
- Fourth place: Singapore

The baseball tournament at the 2019 Southeast Asian Games in the Philippines was held at the Clark International Sports Complex at The Villages, in Pampanga from 2 to 8 December 2019. The sport was only contested by men's national teams.

== Participating nations ==
A total of 111 athletes from 5 nations participated (the numbers of athletes are shown in parentheses).

- Cambodia (18)
- Indonesia (24)
- Philippines (24)
- Singapore (21)
- Thailand (24)

== Competition schedule ==
The following is the competition schedule for the baseball competitions:

O	Opening round	B	3rd place play-off	F	Final

Mon 2	Tue 3	Wed 4	Thu 5	Fri 6	Sat 7	Sun 8	
O	O	O		O	O	B	F

== Squads ==
Cambodia (CAM)	Indonesia (INA)	Philippines (PHI)	Singapore (SGP)	Thailand (THA)

== Opening round ==
- All times are Philippine Standard Time (UTC+08:00).
- The top four teams in each pool qualified for the medal events.

Advanced to the gold medal game
Advanced to the bronze medal game

Team	W	L	RS	RA	DIFF	PTS
Philippines (H)	4	0	60	3	57	12
Thailand	3	1	20	14	6	9
Indonesia	2	2	27	28	–1	6
Singapore	1	3	23	44	–21	3
Cambodia	0	4	2	43	–41	0

=== Results ===
December 2, 2019; 11:00	Singapore	7–14	Indonesia	Clark Sports Complex – Field 2, Mabalacat
December 2, 2019; 11:00		Boxscore		Clark Sports Complex – Field 2, Mabalacat

December 2, 2019; 13:00	Philippines	3–2	Thailand	Clark Sports Complex – Field 1, Mabalacat
December 2, 2019; 13:00		Boxscore		Clark Sports Complex – Field 1, Mabalacat

December 3, 2019; 11:00	Thailand	12–7	Singapore	Clark Sports Complex – Field 2, Mabalacat
December 3, 2019; 11:00		Boxscore		Clark Sports Complex – Field 2, Mabalacat

December 3, 2019; 12:10	Cambodia	0–12	Philippines	Clark Sports Complex – Field 1, Mabalacat
December 3, 2019; 12:10		Boxscore		Clark Sports Complex – Field 1, Mabalacat

December 4, 2019; 11:00	Indonesia	8–1	Cambodia	Clark Sports Complex – Field 2, Mabalacat
December 4, 2019; 11:00		Boxscore		Clark Sports Complex – Field 2, Mabalacat

December 4, 2019; 13:00	Philippines	17–0	Singapore	Clark Sports Complex – Field 1, Mabalacat
December 4, 2019; 13:00		Boxscore		Clark Sports Complex – Field 1, Mabalacat

December 6, 2019; 11:00	Thailand	14–0	Cambodia	Clark Sports Complex – Field 2, Mabalacat
December 6, 2019; 11:00		Boxscore		Clark Sports Complex – Field 2, Mabalacat

December 6, 2019; 13:00	Indonesia	1–14	Philippines	Clark Sports Complex – Field 1, Mabalacat
December 6, 2019; 13:00		Boxscore		Clark Sports Complex – Field 1, Mabalacat

December 7, 2019; 11:00	Singapore	9–1	Cambodia	Clark Sports Complex – Field 2, Mabalacat
December 7, 2019; 11:00		Boxscore		Clark Sports Complex – Field 2, Mabalacat

December 7, 2019; 13:00	Indonesia	4–6	Thailand	Clark Sports Complex – Field 1, Mabalacat
December 7, 2019; 13:00		Boxscore		Clark Sports Complex – Field 1, Mabalacat

== Final round ==
- All times are Philippine Standard Time (UTC+08:00).

=== Bronze medal game ===
December 8, 2019; 11:00	Indonesia	10–4	Singapore	Clark Sports Complex – Field 2, Mabalacat
December 8, 2019; 11:00		Boxscore		Clark Sports Complex – Field 2, Mabalacat

=== Gold medal game ===
December 8, 2019; 13:00	Thailand	2–15	Philippines	Clark Sports Complex – Field 1, Mabalacat
December 8, 2019; 13:00		Boxscore		Clark Sports Complex – Field 1, Mabalacat

== Final standings ==
Rank	Team	Pld	W	L
1st place, gold medalist(s)	Philippines	5	5	0
2nd place, silver medalist(s)	Thailand	5	3	2
3rd place, bronze medalist(s)	Indonesia	5	3	2
4	Singapore	5	1	4
5	Cambodia	4	0	4

== Medalists ==
Event	Gold	Silver	Bronze
Men	Philippines (PHI); Dino Emiglio Altomonte; Adriane Ros Bernardo; Erwin Bosito; Clarence Lyle Caasalan; Bryan Victrix Castillo; Alfredo de Guzman III; Junmar Diarao; Vladimir Eguia; Ignacio Luis Escano; Francis Michael Gesmundo; Arvin Maynard Herrera; Jarus Inobio; Romeo Jasmin Jr. Ferdinand Liguayan Jr. Juan Diego Lozano; Juan Alvaro Macasaet; Juan Paolo Macasaet; Mark Steven Manaig; Jennald Pareja; Jonash Ponce; Jon Jon Robles; Miguel Jose Salud; Kyle Rodrigo Villafaña Jr. Jerome Yenson	Thailand (THA); Setthawut Bucha; Nirawit Bunnam; John Daniel Daru; Joseph Matthew Daru; Oliver Graeme Dunn; Pipat Hongsrisuwan; Sarawut Jandang; Kamolphan Kanjanavisut; Suppakorn Lin; Naruephol Muangkasem; Siraphop Nadee; Netithorn Nualla-ong; Travis Tanthai Owens; Sakai Phraechai; Sanyalak Pipatpinyo; Ryan Richard Rodgers; Wissaroot Sihamat; Sek Sitthikaew; Chayaphat Suanthong; Anukul Sudsawad; Phanuwat Sukmuang; Nirun Supasiritananon; Narin Turapa; Phoomwut Wutthikorn	Indonesia (INA); Aditya Muflih Mahmud; Akbar Aminudin; Alexander Aribowo; Andersen Lim; Andika Arlistianto; Anhar Rachman; Bachtiar Sanjaya; Diva Fabil; Faldy Zulfikar; Gunawan Khallista; Hadi Nur Muhammad; Hakeem Rahniady Putra Adi Yatim; Hasruddin; Jericho Junior; Jerry Rachman; Lutfi Shurianto; Nanda Dwi Saputra; Nazrey Lazuardi; Ranjani; Rawafi Yaputra Yanto Rozali; Ray Santoso; Rizdki Aditya; Rizki Ramadhan; Zidney Fahmidyan
