= Baseball at the 2011 SEA Games =

Tournament details
- Country: Indonesia
- Dates: 13-20 November
- Teams: 5
- Defending champions: Thailand

Final positions
- Champions: Philippines (2nd title)
- Runners-up: Indonesia
- Third place: Thailand
- Fourth place: Vietnam

Baseball in the 26th Southeast Asian Games were held at Palembang, Indonesia. All games were held at the Jakabaring Sport Complex.

== Preliminary round ==
Pos	Team	Pld	W	L	RF	RA	RD	Pts	Qualification
1	Philippines	4	4	0	33	2	+31	8	Qualified to the gold medal game
2	Indonesia	4	3	1	34	9	+25	7	Qualified to the gold medal game
3	Thailand	4	2	2	35	14	+21	6	Qualified to the bronze medal game
4	Vietnam	4	1	3	4	50	−46	5	Qualified to the bronze medal game
5	Malaysia	4	0	4	10	40	−30	4	

Qualified to the gold medal game
Qualified to the bronze medal game

Team	GP	W	L	RS	RA	DIFF	PTS
Philippines	4	4	0	33	2	+31	8
Indonesia	4	3	1	34	9	+25	7
Thailand	4	2	2	35	14	+21	6
Vietnam	4	1	3	4	50	−44	5
Malaysia	4	0	4	10	40	−31	4

- First game is at 10:00, and the second game is at 14:30, UTC+7.

=== November 13 ===
Team	1	2	3	4	5	6	7	8	9	R	H	E
Philippines	0	0	1	1	7	0	0	0	0	9	15	1
Thailand	0	1	1	0	0	0	0	0	0	2	10	1

Team	1	2	3	4	5	6	7	R	H	E
Malaysia	0	0	0	0	0	0	0	0	0	5
Indonesia	6	1	0	3	4	0	0	14	8	5

=== November 14 ===
Team	1	2	3	4	5	6	7	8	9	10	R	H	E
Indonesia	0	0	2	0	0	0	2	1	0	2	7	9	4
Thailand	0	0	0	3	0	0	2	1	0	0	5	9	4

Team	1	2	3	4	5	6	7	8	R	H	E
Vietnam	0	0	0	0	0	0	0	0	0	1	5
Philippines	1	3	0	1	1	0	0	0	10	9	5

=== November 15 ===
Team	1	2	3	4	5	6	7	R	H	E
Thailand	1	4	3	0	0	0	4	12	11	0
Vietnam	0	0	0	0	0	0	0	0	0	0

Team	1	2	3	4	5	6	7	R	H	E
Malaysia	0	0	0	0	0	0	0	0	0	0
Philippines	2	2	0	0	2	0	0	10	9	0

=== November 16 ===
Team	1	2	3	4	5	6	R	H	E
Indonesia	5	1	1	3	3	2	15	8	3
Vietnam	0	0	0	0	0	2	0	0	3

Team	1	2	3	4	5	R	H	E
Thailand	2	7	0	4	3	16	7	1
Malaysia	0	0	0	0	0	0	1	1

=== November 17 ===
Team	1	2	3	4	5	6	7	8	9	R	H	E
Philippines	2	0	0	0	0	0	0	2	0	4	10	1
Indonesia	0	0	0	0	0	0	0	0	0	0	2	1

Team	1	2	3	4	5	6	7	8	9	R	H	E
Vietnam	0	0	2	4	2	0	1	1	0	10	6	3
Malaysia	1	3	0	0	0	0	1	1	0	4	6	3

== Medal round ==
=== Bronze medal game ===
- November 19, 10:00 a.m.

Team	1	2	3	4	5	6	7	8	9	R	H	E
Vietnam	0	1	3	0	0	0	0	0	0	4	1	3
Thailand	1	0	3	1	3	3	1	0	0	12	15	3

=== Gold medal game ===
- November 20, 10:00 a.m.

Team	1	2	3	4	5	6	7	8	9	R	H	E
Indonesia	0	0	0	0	0	0	0	0	0	0	4	1
Philippines	0	0	0	0	0	1	0	1	0	2	6	1

== Medal summary ==
=== Medal tally ===
Rank	Nation	Gold	Silver	Bronze	Total
1	Philippines	1	0	0	1
2	Indonesia	0	1	0	1
3	Thailand	0	0	1	1
Totals (3 entries)		1	1	1	3

=== Medalists ===
Med
NOC/Names
Med
NOC/Names
Med
NOC/Names

Philippines

Indonesia

Thailand

Alfredo Olivares, Jr.
Carlos Alberto Munoz
Charlie Labrador
Christian Canlas
Darwin Dela Calzada
Ernesto Binarao
Francis Candela
Fulgencio Rances, Jr.
Galedo Christian
Jonash Ponce
Jon-Jon Robles
Joseph Orillana
Junnifer Pinero
Marvin Malig
Matt Laurel
Ram Casey Alipio
Roel Empacis
Romeo Jasmin, Jr.
Rommel Roja
Ruben Angeles
Saxon Omandac
Vladimir Eguia

Adi Susanto
Ahmad Effendy
Andika Arlistianto
Angga Prananda Bakti
Daniel Christianto
Derry Wilton
Donny Trisnadi
Elia Muara Kasih
Eru Mahmud
Feggi Firman Ferdiasyah
Indrayosa Pratomo
Jesse Parengkuan
Kogi Putratama
Lucky Prasetyo
Mario Baraputra Insamdora
Muhammad Akbar
Ranjani
Rawafi Yaputra Yanto
Ridha Wirahman
Sulaeman Mubarok
Ugrasena
Yusep Firmansyah

Adichat Wongvichit
Apichat Ngamying
Bongkot Ananthanas
Chanatip Thongbai
Chidsanu Janrak
Jittiphong Chong-On
Jack Daru
Joe Daru
Kamolphan Kanjanav
Kiengkai Aoyama
Kuakun Aoyama
Mukkapol Subsuleku
Narin Turapa
Nattapong Meeboonr
Nattapong Sampahan
Nirun Jaroenkitsir
Putiporn Chavala
Sanyalak Pipatpiny
Sek Sitthikaew
Siraphop Nadee
Somsak Sarnwit
Teerasak Kongsabai
