= Myanmar national baseball team =

National sports team

Information
- Country: Myanmar
- Federation: Myanmar Baseball Softball Confederation
- Confederation: Baseball Federation of Asia

WBSC ranking
- Current: NR (26 March 2026)

Asian Games
- Best result: }z]

The Myanmar national baseball team is the national baseball team of Myanmar. The team represents Myanmar in international competitions.

== Placings ==
Southeast Asian Games

- 2005 : 4th
- 2007 : 4th
