= Hong Kong national baseball team =

Information
- Country: Hong Kong
- Federation: Hong Kong Baseball Association
- Confederation: Baseball Federation of Asia

WBSC ranking
- Current: 32 (26 October 2026)

The Hong Kong national baseball team (Chinese: 香港棒球代表隊; Cantonese Yale: Hēunggóng bóngkàuh doihbíu deuih) also known as “The Falcons” is the representative team for Hong Kong in international baseball competition. The team finished 6th in the 2007 Asian Baseball Championship.

== Competition results ==
=== Asian Games ===
- 2010 : 7th
- 2014 : 7th
- 2018 : 6th
- 2023 : 6th
- 2026 : 8th

== Current roster ==
Roster for the 2012 East Asian Cup:

Manager
David Wong Tai Wai
Coaches
Au Hok Leung (Head Coach), Ng Yuk Ming, Chan Tsz Yeung

Player	No.	Pos.
Yu Hong Lau	1	C
Ho Nam Leung	56	C
Ho Yin Leung	10	IF
Sam Ka Ho Leung	38	P
Yu Chung Leung	16	P
Wing Sing Li	28	P
Andy Ho Lam Lo	77	OF
Ching Nam Nau	7	IF
Yau Pang Ng	66	OF
Kin Chung Tsang	57	IF
Tze Tung Wu	52	IF
Tsz Him Yan	19	IF
Kun Hin Yeung	24	P
Hing Long Yip	23	OF
Chu Pok Ting		P
Wing Leung Au	12	Captain/IF
Duncan Chun Shing Chau	15	P
Gordon Chun Ming Chau	9	P
Enroy Yan Nok Chiu	6	OF

== Results and fixtures ==
=== 2018 ===
2018 Asian Games	26 August 2018	Indonesia	4–7	Hong Kong	Gelora Bungkarno Baseball Field, Jakarta, Indonesia
2018 Asian Games	12:00 WIB

2018 Asian Games	27 August 2018	Hong Kong	1–16 (F/5)	Chinese Taipei	Gelora Bungkarno Baseball Field, Jakarta, Indonesia
2018 Asian Games	11:00 PHT

Group Stage	28 August 2018	Hong Kong	3–21	South Korea	Gelora Bungkarno Baseball Field, Jakarta, Indonesia
Group Stage	13:00 PHT

2018 Asian Games	30 August 2018	Thailand	4–5	Hong Kong	Gelora Bungkarno Baseball Field, Jakarta, Indonesia
2018 Asian Games	14:00 WIB

2018 Asian Games	31 August 2018	Pakistan	12–2 (F/7)	Hong Kong	Gelora Bungkarno Baseball Field, Jakarta, Indonesia
2018 Asian Games	13:00 PHT

=== 2019 ===
2019 Asian Championship	14 October 2019	Chinese Taipei	17–2 (F/5)	Hong Kong	Taichung Intercontinental Baseball Stadium, Taichung, Taiwan
2019 Asian Championship	12:00 TST

2019 Asian Championship	15 October 2019	Hong Kong	5–1	Sri Lanka	Taichung Baseball Field, Taichung, Taiwan
2019 Asian Championship	12:00 TST

2019 Asian Championship	16 October 2019	Hong Kong	0–15 (F/5)	Japan	Taichung Baseball Field, Taichung, Taiwan
2019 Asian Championship	18:30 TST

2019 Asian Championship	18 October 2019	Philippines	10–0 (F/8)	Hong Kong	Taichung Baseball Field, Taichung, Taiwan
2019 Asian Championship	18:30 TST

2019 Asian Championship	19 October 2019	Hong Kong	17–7 (F/7)	Pakistan	Taichung Baseball Field, Taichung, Taiwan
2019 Asian Championship	12:00 TST

=== 2023 ===
2023 East Asian Baseball Cup	29 April 2023	Hong Kong	15–8	Thailand	Sirikit Main Baseball Stadium, Pathum Thani, Thailand
2023 East Asian Baseball Cup	13:30 ICT		Boxscore

2023 East Asian Baseball Cup	30 April 2023	Laos	0–18	Hong Kong	Sirikit Main Baseball Stadium, Pathum Thani, Thailand
2023 East Asian Baseball Cup	13:00 ICT		Boxscore

2023 East Asian Baseball Cup	2 May 2023	Singapore	0–3	Hong Kong	Sirikit Main Baseball Stadium, Pathum Thani, Thailand
2023 East Asian Baseball Cup	13:00 ICT		Boxscore

2023 East Asian Baseball Cup	3 May 2023	Philippines	1–8	Hong Kong	Sirikit Main Baseball Stadium, Pathum Thani, Thailand
2023 East Asian Baseball Cup	13:00 ICT		Boxscore

2023 East Asian Baseball Cup (Gold Medal Game)	4 May 2023	Philippines	2–10	Hong Kong	Sirikit Main Baseball Stadium, Pathum Thani, Thailand
2023 East Asian Baseball Cup (Gold Medal Game)	13:00 ICT		Boxscore

2022 Asian Games	October 1, 2023	Hong Kong	0–10 (F/8)	South Korea	Baseball & Softball Sports Center, Shaoxing, China
2022 Asian Games	18:30 CST	LP: Leung Chung Hei	Boxscore	LP: Choi Ji-min	Umpires: Hironori Yoshino (JPN)

2022 Asian Games	October 2, 2023	Hong Kong	8–0	Thailand	Baseball & Softball Sports Center, Shaoxing, China
2022 Asian Games	12:00 CST	WP: Leung Chung Hei	Boxscore	LP: Siraphop Nadee	Umpires: Wu Ding (CHN)

2022 Asian Games	October 3, 2023	Chinese Taipei	15–0 (F/6)	Hong Kong	Baseball & Softball Sports Center, Shaoxing, China
2022 Asian Games	12:00 CST	WP: Lai Po-wei	Boxscore	LP: Sam Leung	Umpires: Masataka Mino (JPN)

2022 Asian Games	October 5, 2023	Hong Kong	1–5	Philippines	Baseball & Softball Sports Center, Shaoxing, China
2022 Asian Games	18:30 CST	LP: Lam Lai Him		WP: Junmar Diarao; Sv: Romeo Jasmin Jr.	Umpires: Wang Tianyi (CHN)

2022 Asian Games	October 6, 2023	Laos	0–11	Hong Kong	Baseball & Softball Sports Center, Shaoxing, China
2022 Asian Games	18:30 CST	LP: Mung Chuevakham	Boxscore	WP: Sam Leung; HR: York Sze (1)	Umpires: Chen Te-jung (TPE)

=== 2024 ===
East Asia Cup	October 29, 2024	Malaysia	1–16	Hong Kong	The Villages Sports Complex Stadium 2, Mabalacat, Philippines
East Asia Cup	9:00 PHT		Boxscore		Attendance: 152

East Asia Cup	October 30, 2024	Hong Kong	5–2	Cambodia	The Villages Sports Complex Stadium 2, Mabalacat, Philippines
East Asia Cup	9:00 PHT		Boxscore		Attendance: 102

East Asia Cup	October 31, 2024	Hong Kong	7-0	Thailand	The Villages Sports Complex Stadium 2, Mabalacat, Philippines
East Asia Cup	9:00 PHT		Boxscore		Attendance: 96

East Asia Cup	November 1, 2024	Hong Kong	14–4 (F/7)	Singapore	The Villages Sports Complex Stadium 2, Mabalacat, Philippines
East Asia Cup	9:00 PHT		Boxscore		Attendance: 62

East Asia Cup	November 2, 2024	Hong Kong	2–4	Philippines	The Villages Sports Complex Stadium 2, Mabalacat, Philippines
East Asia Cup	9:00 PHT		Boxscore		Attendance: 487

East Asia Cup	November 3, 2024	Philippines	9–2	Hong Kong	The Villages Sports Complex Stadium 2, Mabalacat, Philippines
East Asia Cup	11:00 PHT		Boxscore		Attendance: 588

=== 2025 ===
2025 Asian Baseball Championship	September 22, 2025	Hong Kong	1-16 (F/6)	South Korea	Pingtan Baseball Stadium, Fuzhou, China
2025 Asian Baseball Championship	13:30 CST		Boxscore		Attendance: 58

2025 Asian Baseball Championship	September 23, 2025	Palestine	5–2	Hong Kong	Pingtan Baseball Stadium, Fuzhou, China
2025 Asian Baseball Championship	12:30 CST		Boxscore		Attendance: 180

2025 Asian Baseball Championship	September 24, 2025	Hong Kong	0–11 (F/7)	Chinese Taipei	Pingtan Baseball Stadium, Fuzhou, China
2025 Asian Baseball Championship	18:30 CST		Boxscore		Attendance: 200

2025 Asian Baseball Championship	September 26, 2025	Pakistan	5–9	Hong Kong	Pingtan Baseball Stadium, Fuzhou, China
2025 Asian Baseball Championship	12:30 CST		Boxscore		Attendance: 200

2025 Asian Baseball Championship	September 27, 2025	Hong Kong	6–7	Philippines	Pingtan Baseball Stadium, Fuzhou, China
2025 Asian Baseball Championship	18:30 CST		Boxscore		Attendance: 350

== Alumni ==
The team, consisting of young Chinese men, courted some controversy in the Hong Kong media, when they were shown naked on camera in a Hong Kong film, City Without Baseball, with their private parts fully exposed in several scenes. One of the team's main players, Ron Heung Tze-Chun, who was also the main character in the film, has gone on to become a Hong Kong film actor.

== Venues ==
Hong Kong Baseball uses two fields for practice and games:

- Sai Tso Wan Recreation Ground - located in Lam Tin, it is the training venue for the team and built on a landfill site in 2004
- Lion Rock Park Baseball Field - located to the left of the south end of Lion Rock Tunnel and south side of the larger Lion Rock Country Park, it is an alternate baseball venue for the team
