= The Villages Sports Complex =

Sports venue complex in Mabalacat, the Philippines

- Interactive map of The Villages Sports Complex
- Full name: The Villages Sports Complex
- Former names: Clark International Sports Complex
- Location: The Villages, Mabalacat, Clark Freeport Zone, Pampanga
- Coordinates: 15°12′10.1″N 120°31′17.3″E
- Owner: NAB Group of Companies
- Main venue: 2 MLB-regulation size baseball fields
- Facilities: 4 wagon wheel baseball fields; 2 multipurpose fields
- Acreage: ~14.1 hectares (35 acres)

Website
- www.thevillagesatglobalclark.com/sports-complex

The Villages Sports Complex, formerly the Clark International Sports Complex, is a sports venue complex in Mabalacat, Pampanga, Philippines. It is part of The Villages at Global Clark development.

== Facilities ==
The Villages Sports Complex hosts eight sporting fields: two professional baseball fields with Major League Baseball dimensions, four wheel wagon baseball fields suitable for both training and competition use, and two multi-purpose fields that can be used to host football and rugby matches.

The sports complex grounds also have a 2 km (1.2 mi) jogging path, a beach volleyball area, a 400 m^{2} (4,300 sq ft) multipurpose hall, and an open-air pavilion adjacent to one of the two professional baseball fields.

== Events ==
Primarily a baseball venue, The Villages Sports Complex has hosted the 2016 Asia Pacific Senior League Baseball. It is also capable of accommodating softball events having hosted the 2018 Asian Junior (under-19) Women's Softball Championship.

It hosted the baseball and softball events of the 2019 Southeast Asian Games as well as the 2024 East Asia Baseball Cup.
