= Indonesia national baseball team =

Information
- Country: Indonesia
- Federation: PERBASASI
- Confederation: Baseball Federation of Asia

WBSC ranking
- Current: 54 (26 March 2026)

Asian Games
- Appearances: 1 (first in 2018)
- Best result: 7th (in 2018)

Asian Championship
- Appearances: 4 (first in 2001)
- Best result: 5th (in 2015)

The Indonesia national baseball team is the national baseball team of Indonesia. The team represents Indonesia in international baseball competitions.

== Competitive records ==
Asian Baseball Championship Div 1

- 2001 – 6th place
- 2003 – 6th place
- 2009 – 7th place
- 2015 – 5th place

Asian Baseball Championship Div 2

- 2001 – (gold) 1st place
- 2009 – (gold) 1st place

Asian Games

- 2018 – 7th place

Southeast Asian Games

- 2005 – (bronze) 3rd place
- 2007 – (bronze) 3rd place
- 2011 – (silver) 2nd place
- 2019 – (bronze) 3rd place
- 2025 – (bronze) 3rd place
