= Queen Sirikit's 60th Anniversary Stadium =

Stadium in Pathum Thani Province, Thailand

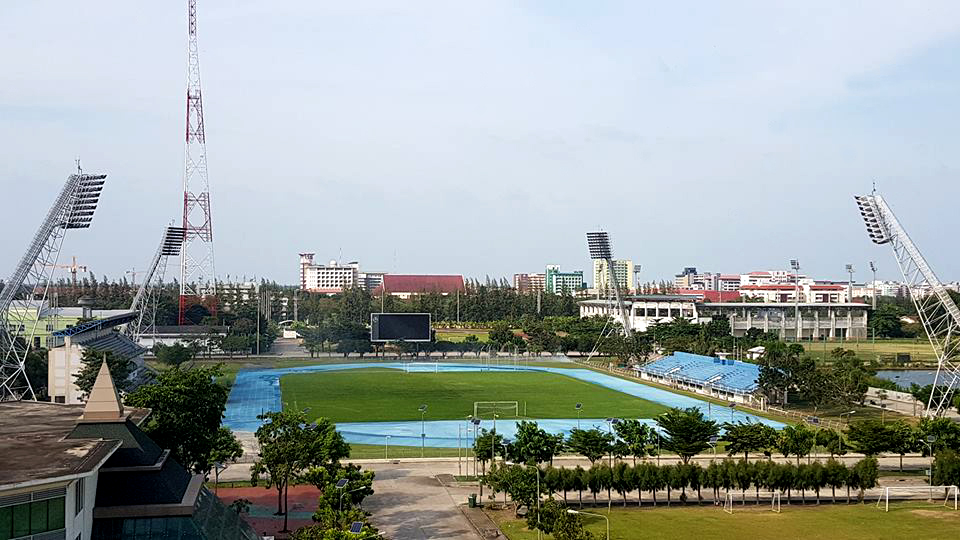
- Interactive map of Queen Sirikit's 60th Anniversary Stadium
- Former names: Chaloem Phra Kiat Stadium (Khlong 6)
- Location: Pathum Thani, Thailand
- Coordinates: 14°01′41″N 100°43′33″E
- Owner: Department of Physical Education
- Operator: Department of Physical Education
- Capacity: 5,000
- Surface: Grass

Queen Sirikit's 60th Anniversary Stadium (Thai: สนามกีฬาเฉลิมพระเกียรติ สมเด็จพระนางเจ้าสิริกิติ์ พระบรมราชินีนาถ 60 พรรษา) is a multi-purpose stadium in Pathum Thani Province, Thailand. The stadium was built on occasion of celebration the 60th Birthday Anniversary of Queen Sirikit, hence the name of the venue. It is currently used mostly for football matches. The stadium holds 5,000 people.
