= Palestine national baseball team =

National baseball team of Palestine

Information
- Country: Palestine
- Federation: Palestinian Baseball and Softball Federation
- Confederation: WBSC Asia
- Manager: Ozzie Guillen Jr.

WBSC ranking
- Current: 30 (26 October 2026)
- Highest: 30 (26 October 2026)
- Lowest: 65 (28 March 2023)

Asian Games
- Appearances: 1 (first in 2026)

Asian Championship
- Appearances: 2 (first in 2023)
- Best result: 5th (in 2025)

The Palestine national baseball team is the national baseball team of Palestine, representing the country in international competitions.

The team is controlled by the Palestinian Baseball and Softball Federation, which is a member of the Baseball Federation of Asia since 2017. Palestine won its first international tournament at the 2025 West Asia Baseball Cup.

== History ==
Palestine first organized a national baseball team around 2017, starting with a small number of players from the Gaza Strip. The team then recruited several Palestinian American players, which eventually grew to make up a larger part of the team after the Gaza war cut off access to many homegrown players starting in 2023. At least two national team players have been killed in the war: outfielder and team captain Ashraf Murad, killed near Al-Shifa Hospital in March 2024, and infielder/outfielder Mustafa Tafesh, killed in August 2025.

As part of preparation for the 2025 Asian Baseball Championship, Palestine competed in an exhibition series against Pakistan at Ozinga Field in Crestwood, Illinois.

They made their Asian Games in the 2026 edition in Aichi and Nagoya, Japan.

== Results and fixtures ==
The following is a list of professional baseball match results currently active in the latest version of the WBSC World Rankings, as well as any future matches that have been scheduled.

Legend

Win Lose Void or postponed Fixture

=== 2023 ===
West Asia Baseball Cup GS	January 27	Palestine	WALKOVER	India	Islamabad, Pakistan
West Asia Baseball Cup GS			Boxscore

West Asia Baseball Cup GS	January 28	Palestine	21–1 (F/5)	Nepal	Islamabad, Pakistan
West Asia Baseball Cup GS			Boxscore

West Asia Baseball Cup GS	January 29	Palestine	10–0 (F/5)	Sri Lanka	Islamabad, Pakistan
West Asia Baseball Cup GS			Boxscore

West Asia Baseball Cup SF	January 31	Bangladesh	3–14 (F/5)	Palestine	Islamabad, Pakistan
West Asia Baseball Cup SF			Boxscore

West Asia Baseball Cup Final	February 1	Pakistan	11–3	Palestine	Islamabad, Pakistan
West Asia Baseball Cup Final			Boxscore

Lincoln Cup 2023	August 5	Pakistan	3–5	Palestine	Illinois, United States

Asian Baseball Championship - Group A	December 4	Palestine	3-1	Hong Kong	Taichung, Taiwan
Asian Baseball Championship - Group A			Boxscore

Asian Baseball Championship - Group A	December 5	Chinese Taipei	19–0 (F/6)	Palestine	Taichung, Taiwan
Asian Baseball Championship - Group A			Boxscore

Asian Baseball Championship - Group A	December 6	Palestine	1-19 (F/5)	South Korea	Taichung, Taiwan
Asian Baseball Championship - Group A			Boxscore

Asian Baseball Championship - Placement	December 8	Palestine	3-12	Pakistan	New Taipei City, Taiwan
Asian Baseball Championship - Placement			Boxscore

Asian Baseball Championship - Placement	December 9	Thailand	0-4	Palestine	New Taipei City, Taiwan
Asian Baseball Championship - Placement			Boxscore

== International tournament results ==
=== World Baseball Classic ===
World Baseball Classic record							Qualification record			
Year	Round	Position	W	L	RS	RA	W	L	RS	RA
2006	Did not enter						No qualifiers held			
2009	Did not enter						No qualifiers held			
2013	Did not enter						Did not enter			
2017	Did not enter						Did not enter			
2023	Did not enter						Did not enter			
2026	Did not enter						Did not enter			
Total	0/6	–	–	–	–	–	-	-	-	-

=== Asian Baseball Championship ===
Based on its performance at the Asian Baseball Cup, Palestine qualified for the top continental tournament, the Asian Baseball Championship, in 2023 and 2025. Palestine finished seventh in 2023, defeating Hong Kong and Thailand and losing three times. In 2025, Palestine finished in fifth place, winning the bottom-four placement round.

=== Asian Games ===
Asian Games record
Year	Round	Position	Pld	W	L	RS	RA
(Indonesia) 2018	—N/a	Did not participate					
(China) 2022	—N/a	Did not participate					
(Japan) 2026	Placement	7th	5	1	4	8	51
Total	0 Titles		5	1	5	8	51

=== West Asia Baseball Cup ===
Palestine's first appearance at the West Asia Baseball Cup was in 2023. Palestine won their first championship in the 2025 West Asia Baseball Cup.

== Current roster ==
Palestine's roster for the 2025 Asian Baseball Championship.

Palestine roster – 2025 West Asia Baseball Cup
Players		Coaches
Pitchers: 36 Paul Baba; 16 Kyle Bader; 11 Ahmad Ghouleh; 25 Yunis Haleem; 45 Ahmad Harajli; 10 Patrick Khoury; 9 Steven Mufareh; 14 Adam Musa; 19 David Powres; 21 Yacoub Rayan; 77 Omar Shublaq; 37 Joseph Yabbour	Catchers: 12 Like Shahin Kubty; 6 Tariq Suboh; Infielders: 1 Dylan Ahmad; 26 Rumsey Yasin; Outfielders: 2 Malik Abdallah; 33 Hasan Ammar; 55 Abdel Dolah; 42 Tarik El-Abour; 7 Charles Haddad; 14 Adam Musa	Manager: 31 Oney Guillen; Coaches: 13 Ozzie Guillen Jr.; 8 Freddy García
