= Kazuto Nonaka =

Japanese baseball manager (born 1975)

- Manager
- Born: May 12, 1961 (age 64); Ōta, Tokyo, Japan
- Bats: Unknown Throws: Unknown
Medals
Men's baseball
Manager for Sri Lanka
West Asia Cup
Gold medal – first place	2019 Colombo	Team

Kazuto Nonaka (Japanese: 野中寿人, born June 6, 1961) is a Japanese baseball coach and promoter. He has managed the Indonesia national baseball team and is currently the manager of the Pakistan national baseball team, which he skippered at the 2025 Asian Baseball Championship.

Nonaka played with Third Junior & Senior High School of Nihon University as a catcher at the 1979 Summer Koshien tournament. Despite offers from professional baseball teams, he chose to attend university. Despite wishing to attend Meiji University, he was pressured to enroll at Nihon University. He dropped out six months later. He worked outside of baseball in Japan and the Philippines before moving to Indonesia in 2001, where he ran a tourism business.

Nonaka began coaching youth baseball in Bali, and his work eventually earned him appointment as the manager of the Indonesian national baseball team. He steered Indonesia at the 2009 Asian Baseball Championship, its first appearance at the top level of baseball competition in Asia. He managed the Sri Lanka national baseball team at the 2019 West Asia Baseball Cup, winning the gold, and the 2023 West Asia Baseball Cup. He also coached Sri Lanka to a semifinals berth at the Baseball United Arab Classic, held in Dubai in 2024.

Nonaka helped found the Saga Asian Dreams, a minor league team playing in Japan's Kyushu Asia League. His vision for the team was to sign emerging talents from Indonesia, Sri Lanka, Singapore, and other Asian countries where baseball is a developing sport.

In July 2025, Pakistan Federation Baseball announced that it had hired Nonaka as manager for the Pakistan at the 2025 Asian Baseball Championship. Nonaka's experience with Saga Asian Dreams, and its two Pakistani pitchers, Faisal Hayat and Musharaf Khan, was cited as a factor in the appointment.
