= 2017 West Asia Baseball Cup =

Tournament details
- Country: Pakistan
- City: Islamabad
- Venue: 1 (in 1 host city)
- Dates: 25 February–1 March 2017
- Teams: 5 (from 1 confederation)
- Defending champions: Pakistan

Final positions
- Champions: Sri Lanka (1st title)
- Runners-up: Pakistan
- Third place: Iran
- Fourth place: Nepal

Tournament statistics
- Games played: 8

The 2017 West Asia Baseball Cup was an international baseball tournament contested by the men's national teams of WBSC Asia's member associations. It served as qualification to the 2017 Asian Baseball Championship.

It was supposed to be divided into two separate divisions, East and West, alternatively called the 2017 East Asian Baseball Cup and 2017 West Asian Baseball Cup. However, the East Asia tournament was cancelled due to lack of a suitable host.

The 2017 West Asia Baseball Cup was held from 25 February 2017 to 1 March 2017 at Jinnah Sports Stadium in Islamabad, Pakistan. It saw Nepal participating in their first competition, and Sri Lanka moving to the West Cup. The latter were crowned as the champions for the first time after they beat hosts Pakistan in the final.

== Participants ==
West Asia Baseball Cup

- ~~India (61)~~
- Iran (54)
- Iraq (67)
- Nepal (72)
- Pakistan (24) (host)
- Sri Lanka (52)

Pre-tournament WBSC World Rankings (from 24 February 2017) in parentheses

India had to withdraw from the tournament after the team were not issued Pakistan visas.

== West Cup ==
Group A

Rk	Team	W	L	HTH	RS	IPO	RA	IPD	TQB
1	Pakistan	2	0	-					
2	Nepal	1	1	−					
3	Iraq	0	2	−					

NOTE: Tiebreaker notes: HTH − Head-to-head. RS − Runs scored. IPO − Innings the team batted. RA − Runs against. IPD − Innings the team pitched. TQB − The index of (RS/IPO)−(RA/IPD).

25 February 2017; 10:00	Pakistan	16-1	Nepal	Jinnah Sports Stadium, Islamabad

26 February 2017; 10:00	Nepal	13-2	Iraq	Jinnah Sports Stadium, Islamabad

27 February 2017; 10:00	Iraq	0-25	Pakistan	Jinnah Sports Stadium, Islamabad

Group B

Rk	Team	W	L	HTH	RS	IPO	RA	IPD	TQB
1	Sri Lanka	1	0	-					
2	Iran	0	1	−					
3	India	0	0	−					

NOTE: Tiebreaker notes: HTH − Head-to-head. RS − Runs scored. IPO − Innings the team batted. RA − Runs against. IPD − Innings the team pitched. TQB − The index of (RS/IPO)−(RA/IPD).

25 February 2017; 13:30	Iran	cancelled	India	Jinnah Sports Stadium, Islamabad

26 February 2017; 13:30	Sri Lanka	22-0 (F/5)	Iran	Jinnah Sports Stadium, Islamabad

27 February 2017; 13:30	India	cancelled	Sri Lanka	Jinnah Sports Stadium, Islamabad

Playoffs

Semi-finals
February 28, 2017 - 10:00
Pakistan	11
Iran	0
February 28, 2017 - 13:30
Sri Lanka	11
Nepal	0

Final
March 1, 2017 - 13:30
Pakistan	2
Sri Lanka	4
Third place play-off
March 1, 2017 - 10:00
Iran	10
Nepal	6

=== Awards ===
2017 Asian Baseball Cup – Western Division Champions

Sri Lanka
1st title
