= Tarik El-Abour =

- Outfielder
- Born: June 20, 1992 (age 34)
- Bats: Right Throws: Right
- Stats at Baseball Reference

Tarik El-Abour (born June 20, 1992) is a Palestinian-American baseball player. He became the first person officially diagnosed with autism to sign a professional baseball contract when he signed a minor league deal with the Kansas City Royals in 2018.

El-Abour, who grew up in San Marino, California, was diagnosed with autism when he was three years old and nonverbal until age six. He started playing baseball when he was 10 years old. He played college baseball for Concordia University Irvine and Bristol University in Anaheim, California, where he earned a degree in business administration. He then joined the Empire Professional Baseball League, where he was named Rookie of the Year in 2016, and won the title with the Plattsburgh Redbirds in 2017, when he was named an All-Star.

He played briefly in the minor leagues for the Arizona Complex League Royals before being released. In 2023 he played for the Palestinian national team in the 2023 West Asia Baseball Cup, eventually losing in the final to Pakistan. This qualified them for the 2023 Asian Baseball Championship, where they finished 7th. He played as first batter for the team. As of 2025, he played in Los Angeles in a scouting league.
