= Syed Fakhar Ali Shah =

Pakistani baseball coach (born 1985)

President of Pakistan Federation Baseball
- Preceded by: Syed Khawar Shah
- Succeeded by: Shaukat Javed

Personal details
- Born: 2 July 1985 (age 40) Jhang District, Punjab, Pakistan
- Baseball career
- Catcher / manager
- Bats: Right Throws: Right
Medals
Men's baseball
Representing Pakistan
West Asia Cup
Silver medal – second place	2001 Jakarta	Team
Silver medal – second place	2004 Bangkok	Team
Manager for Pakistan
West Asia Cup
Gold medal – first place	2023 Islamabad	Team
Silver medal – second place	2025 Karaj	Team
Arab Classic
Gold medal – first place	2024 Dubai	Team

Syed Fakhar Ali Shah (born 2 July 1985) is a Pakistani baseball manager, administrator, and former player. He is the manager of the Pakistan national baseball team and former president of Pakistan Federation Baseball.

Fakhar's father, Syed Khawar Shah, was the founder of the Pakistan's baseball federation as part of the build-up to the 1992 Olympic Games, where baseball would be featured as a medal sport for the first time (though Pakistan did not qualify). Shah played as catcher for the national team in 2003; he later said he took the position because no one else wanted it. He played with Pakistan at the 2001 Asian Baseball Cup in Indonesia and the 2004 Asian Baseball Cup in Thailand, winning two silver medals.

Fakhar has managed Pakistan at several international competitions, including the 2017 U-15 Asian Baseball Championship in Japan and the 2018 U-12 Asian Championships in Taiwan. He also skippered Pakistan at its debut in the World Baseball Classic qualifiers, held in 2016; it would be Pakistan's first appearance outside of Asia. For the 2023 World Baseball Classic qualifiers, Fakhar expanded the national team to scout not only homegrown players (many of whom are converted cricket players) but also Pakistani American players, such as Gibran Hamdan.

He has held several positions as part of Pakistan Federation Baseball, including president, chairman, and secretary general. Fakhar first became an at-large member of the Baseball Federation of Asia in 2019. He was appointed to the World Baseball Softball Confederation Member Development Commission by Riccardo Fraccari in 2022. In 2023, he signed a partnership agreement between the Pakistani baseball federation and Baseball United, an organization promoting professional baseball in the United Arab Emirates and the broader West Asia region. He was elected president of the South Asian Baseball and Softball Federation, at the organization's second general council in Bangkok in October 2025. Fakhar has criticized the Pakistani government for failing to invest in baseball, with The Friday Times noting that the country's baseball federation is "almost entirely self-funded."

Also in October 2025, Fakhar was sanctioned by the Pakistan Sports Board, which accused him of organizing unauthorized national team trips abroad to Malaysia and Taiwan. Fakhar was also accused of forging an exit permit, purportedly issued by the Ministry of Foreign Affairs; The Express Tribune reported that the matter had been referred to Pakistan's Federal Investigation Agency for further review. In response to the ban, Fakhar said the federation had applied for several permits with no response, adding that missing the events would have caused Pakistan to lose points in the WBSC World Rankings; he noted that Pakistan in 2023 were ranked 22nd in the world, but the lack of funding to participate in international events saw the national team drop to 48th. The federation voted to back Fakhar, noting that he had not been disciplined by the Pakistan Olympic Association. Nevertheless, he left his position of federation secretary in November 2025.
