= 2023 Pioneer League season =

80th annual season of the Pioneer League

- League: Pioneer League
- Sport: Baseball
- Duration: May 23 – September 9
- Games: 96 (480 games in total)
- Teams: 10

North Division
- League champions: Billings Mustangs

South Division
- League champions: Ogden Raptors

Pioneer League Championship
- Champions: Ogden Raptors
- Runners-up: Billings Mustangs

Seasons
- ← 2022 2024 →

The 2023 Pioneer League season is the 80th season of professional baseball in the Pioneer League, an independent baseball league in the Western United States, since its creation in 1939. There are 10 Pioneer League teams, split evenly between North and South divisions.

The Grand Junction Rockies (now named Grand Junction Jackalopes) entered the season as the defending champions, having defeated the Missoula PaddleHeads, two games to zero, in the league's 2022 championship series.

== Season schedule ==
The 10 teams in the league are split evenly between two divisions, North and South. The Grand Junction Rockies changed their name to the Grand Junction Jackalopes.

Over the course of the season, each team will play 96 games in a split schedule between the North Division (Billings, Missoula, Great Falls, Glacier, and Idaho Falls) and the South Division (NoCo, Rocky Mountain, Grand Junction, Boise, and Ogden) with the first half ending on July 16 and the second half ending on September 9. In the playoffs, first-half division winners will play second-half division winners in a best-of-three playoff. The division playoff winners will meet for a final best-of-three championship series.

== Regular season standings ==
Legend:

y
Clinched division
x
Clinched playoff spot
e
Eliminated from playoff contention

=== First half standings ===
North Division Regular Season Standings
Pos	Team	G	W	L	Pct.	GB
1	y – Missoula PaddleHeads	48	35	13	.729	--
2	e – Glacier Range Riders	46	31	15	.674	3.0
3	e – Billings Mustangs	48	19	29	.396	16.0
4	e – Great Falls Voyagers	46	15	31	.326	19.0
5	e – Idaho Falls Chukars	48	15	33	.313	20.0

South Division Regular Season Standings
Pos	Team	G	W	L	Pct.	GB
1	y – Ogden Raptors	48	31	17	.646	--
2	e – Boise Hawks	48	28	20	.583	3.0
3	e – Northern Colorado Owlz	47	23	24	.489	7.5
4	e – Rocky Mountain Vibes	47	20	27	.426	10.5
5	e – Grand Junction Jackalopes	48	20	28	.417	11.0

=== Second half standings ===
North Division Regular Season Standings
Pos	Team	G	W	L	Pct.	GB
1	y – Billings Mustangs	48	32	16	.667	--
2	e – Missoula PaddleHeads	47	31	16	.660	0.5
3	e – Glacier Range Riders	50	23	27	.460	10.0
4	e – Great Falls Voyagers	50	21	29	.420	12.0
5	e – Idaho Falls Chukars	47	18	29	.383	13.5

South Division Regular Season Standings
Pos	Team	G	W	L	Pct.	GB
1	y – Rocky Mountain Vibes	48	28	20	.583	--
2	e – Grand Junction Jackalopes	48	25	23	.521	3.0
3	e – Northern Colorado Owlz	48	23	25	.479	5.0
4	e – Boise Hawks	48	21	27	.438	7.0
5	e – Ogden Raptors	48	19	29	.396	9.0

=== Full season standings ===
North Division Regular Season Standings
Pos	Team	G	W	L	Pct.	GB
1	x – Missoula PaddleHeads	95	66	29	.695	--
2	e – Glacier Range Riders	96	54	42	.563	12.5
3	x – Billings Mustangs	96	51	45	.531	15.5
4	e – Great Falls Voyagers	96	35	61	.365	31.5
5	e – Idaho Falls Chukars	95	34	61	.358	32.0

South Division Regular Season Standings
Pos	Team	G	W	L	Pct.	GB
1	x – Ogden Raptors	96	50	46	.521	--
2	e – Boise Hawks	96	49	47	.537	1.0
3	x – Rocky Mountain Vibes	95	48	47	.505	1.5
4	e – Northern Colorado Owlz	95	46	49	.484	3.5
5	e – Grand Junction Jackalopes	96	45	51	.469	5.0

== Statistical leaders ==
=== Hitting ===
2023 Pioneer League season hitting records
Stat	Player	Team	Total
HR	Reese Alexiades	Ogden Raptors	29
AVG	Dondrei Hubbard	Missoula PaddleHeads	.395
RBIs	Jaylen Hubbard	Grand Junction Jackalopes	117
SB	Payton Robertson	Northern Colorado Owlz	62

=== Pitching ===
2023 Pioneer League season pitching records
Stat	Player	Team	Total
W	Alfredo Villa	Missoula PaddleHeads	13
ERA	Alfredo Villa	Missoula PaddleHeads	2.82
SO	Alfredo Villa	Missoula PaddleHeads	129
SV	Dan Kubiuk	Ogden Raptors	15

== Awards ==
=== End of year awards ===
2023 Pioneer League season end of year awards
Award	Player	Team
Most Valuable Player	Reese Alexiades	Ogden Raptors
Pitcher of the Year	Alfredo Villa	Missoula PaddleHeads
Reliever of the Year	Dan Kubiuk	Ogden Raptors
Rookie of the Year	John Michael Faile / Ron Washington Jr.	Billings Mustangs / Grand Junction Jackalopes
International Player of the Year	Abdel Guadalupe	Northern Colorado Owlz
Manager of the Year	Billy Horton	Billings Mustangs

=== All-star selections ===
All-star hitters in the 2023 Pioneer League season
Position	Player	Team
C	Logan Williams	Raptors
1B	Joe Johnson	Jackalopes
2B	Jaylen Hubbard	Jackalopes
3B	Dusty Stroup	Vibes
SS	McClain O'Connor	PaddleHeads
LF	Henry George	Owlz
CF	Reese Alexiades	Raptors
RF	Ron Washington Jr.	Jackalopes
DH	D.J. Poteet	Hawks

All-star pitchers in the 2023 Pioneer League season
Position	Player	Team
SP	Zach Penrod	PaddleHeads
SP	Alfredo Villa	PaddleHeads
RP	Dan Kubiuk	Raptors
RP	Brandon McCabe	Raptors

== Playoffs ==
=== Format ===
In the playoffs, first-half division winners will play second-half division winners in a best-of-three playoff. The division playoff winners will meet for a final best-of-three championship series.

=== Playoff bracket ===
Division Series (best-of-three)
North Division
Missoula PaddleHeads	5	13	7
Billings Mustangs	8	3	8
South Division
Ogden Raptors	0	9	3
Rocky Mountain Vibes	11	4	1

Championship Series (best-of-three)
Billings Mustangs	4	5	X
Ogden Raptors	7	7	X

== See also ==
- 2023 Major League Baseball season
- 2023 Nippon Professional Baseball season
- 2023 KBO League season
- 2023 Mexican League season
- 2023 Chinese Professional Baseball League season
- 2023 Frontier League season
