= Iran national baseball team =

Information
- Country: Iran
- Federation: Iran Baseball Federation
- Confederation: BFA
- Manager: vacant

WBSC ranking
- Current: 64 (26 October 2026)

The Iran national baseball team (Persian: تیم ملی بیسبال ایران) also known as "Team Melli" is the national baseball team of Iran. The team represents Iran in international competitions.

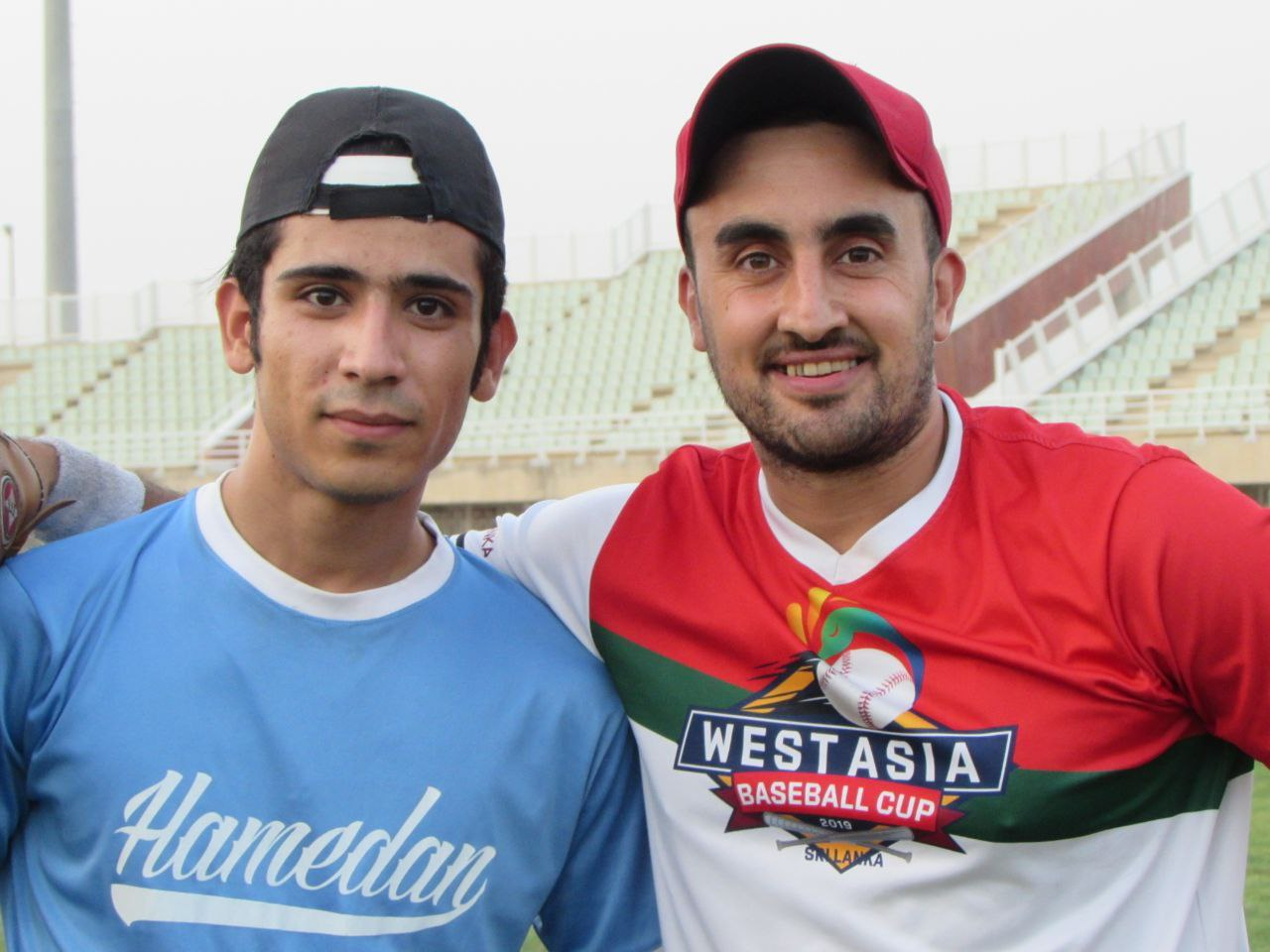
Behnam Ghasemi and Abtin from National Baseball Team

== History ==
Prior to the Iranian Revolution, American high schools, such as Tehran American School and Community School, Tehran, provided extracurricular activities with various sports teams such as baseball, American football, and cheerleading. Following the revolution, baseball waned down in the country before being re-organized in 1991, with an estimated 500 players, coaches and umpires belonging to the national association.

Iran baseball committee was founded in 1992. In 1993 it became a federation and continued to function as a federation until 2010, when it became part of Sports Associations Federation. This was largely caused by the inactivity of its national team. Currently Baseball is played in 12 Provinces in Iran. Iran has one stadium specifically designed for baseball in the city of Karaj. From 1994 until 2009, every year teams representing their provinces participated in a national championship.

In 2010, the National Championship games were replaced by a Club Championship League. Club teams were split into a North and South conference with the top two teams in each conference advancing to the playoffs. Since the inception of this league, Tehran's Azarakhsh Club, Bushehr's Naderi Club and Kerman's Mes Club have been able to each win 1 championship.

Iran's national team has participated in 5 Asia Cups (1999, 2006, 2012, 2013 and 2015) and has been able to win the silver medal and bronze medal in the Western Division in 2012 and 2015.

Iran has won 134 baseball matches and lost 68 baseball matches.

== Players ==
The most notable baseball player of partial Iranian origin is Yu Darvish who was born in Japan to a Japanese mother but has an Iranian father and plays in MLB, although he has not yet received an invitation to the national team.

Pos.	No.	Player	Date of birth (age)	Bats	Throws	Club
		Moein Hassani				(Iran) Kerman
		Behnam Ghasemi	21			(Iran) Isfahan
		Nima Bagherinia				(Iran) Isfahan
		Rajabali Barzegar				(Iran) Semnan
		Ali bahram masiri				(Iran) Hormozgan
		Kaveh Chah Bejari				(Iran) Bushehr
		Abtin Nakhjavanpour				(Iran) Alborz
		Mohammad Goodarzi				(Iran) Alborz
		Mehran Sajjadpour				(Iran) Alborz
		Davoud Jabari				(Iran) Alborz
		Mojtaba Gordan				(Iran) Semnan
		Mohammad Ali Kalantari				(Iran) Semnan
		Jalal Changizi				(Iran) Semnan
		Jalil Changizi				(Iran) Semnan
		Iman Khaligh Saket				(Iran) Gilan
		Hamid Mohammadi				(Iran) Gilan
		Amir Khaligh Saket				(Iran) Gilan
		Kian Naddafi				(Iran) Gilan
		Reham Borhani				(Iran) Gilan
		Amirmohammad pirasteh				(Iran) Alborz
		Ahmadreza Derayesh				(Iran) Isfahan
		Keivan Rana				(Iran) Bushehr
		Yasin Sharifi Ziyarati				(Iran) Bushehr
		Yasser Sedighipour				(Iran) Isfahan
		Mohammad Hossein Safdari				(Iran) Qom
		Hessam Arefzadeh				(Iran) Bushehr
		Reza Shabani				(Iran) Bushehr
		Armin Gharibi				(Iran) Bushehr
		Mehdi Vaezzadeh				(Iran) Bushehr
		Mehdi Masoumi				(Iran) Bushehr
		Amir Bazhvand				(Iran) Tehran
		Mehrdad				(Iran) Bushehr
		Mohsen Mohammadi				(Iran) Bushehr
		Majid Mohammadi Senej				(Iran) Qom
		Seyed Abdollah Mohimian Azad				(Iran) Bushehr
		Nima Vaghari				(Iran) Khorasan Razavi
		Mohammad Reza Arabi				(Iran) Khorasan Razavi
		Reza Yousefi				(Iran) Khorasan Razavi

== Managerial history ==
- (Iran) Mehrdad Hajian, pre-2009
- (United States) Gerardo Yassel Cabrera Moreno, January 2009
- (Dominican Republic) Julio Alberto Hernandez Coste, April 2009
- (Iran) Mehrdad Hajian, 2012-2014
- (Japan) Toma Irokawa, January 2015-July 2015

== Tournament history ==
=== Asian Baseball Cup ===
Host/Year	Round/Rank
(Philippines) 1995, Manila	Did not enter
(Thailand) 1997, Bangkok	Did not enter
(India) 1999, Chandigarh	Participated
(Indonesia) 2001, Jakarta	Did not enter
(Thailand) 2002, Bangkok	Did not enter
(Thailand) 2004, Bangkok	Did not enter
(Pakistan) 2006, Rawalpindi	5th (out of 5 teams)
(Thailand) 2009, Bangkok	Did not enter
(Pakistan) 2010, Islamabad	Did not enter
(Pakistan) 2012, Lahore	Third place
(Pakistan) 2013, Lahore	Did not enter
(Pakistan) 2015, Islamabad	Runner-up
(Pakistan) 2015, Islamabad	Third place

=== Presidential Cup ===
2015 Presidential Cup was an international tournament hosted by Iran, it was played from September 9–13 at Azadi Sport Complex which was won by India, other participants were Iraq

Host/Year	Round/Rank
(Iran) 2015, Tehran	Runner-up

== Achievements ==
Asian Baseball Cup - Western Division

- 2012 : (bronze) 3rd
- 2015 : (silver) 2nd
- 2017 : (bronze) 3rd

Iran Presidential Cup

- 2015 : (silver) 2nd

== Recent fixtures and results ==
2013 Results

27 July; Georgia vs Iran series – Game 1	Georgia	13–5	Iran	Merani Sports Complex

29 July; Georgia vs Iran series – Game 2	Georgia	15–8	Iran	Shatili Sports Complex

31 July; Georgia vs Iran series – Game 3	Georgia	21–5	Iran	Shatili Sports Complex

2015 Results

24 February; Iran vs India – Asian Baseball Cup Western Division	Iran	15-0	India	Jinnah Sports Stadium

26 February; Pakistan vs Iran – Asian Baseball Cup Western Division	Pakistan	12-0	Iran	Jinnah Sports Stadium

27 February; Iran vs Iraq – Asian Baseball Cup Western Division	Iran	18-4	Iraq	Jinnah Sports Stadium

September 2015; Iran vs Iraq – Presidential Cup	Iran	?-?	Iraq	Azadi Sport Complex

September 2015; Iran vs Afghanistan – Presidential Cup	Iran	?-?	Afghanistan	Azadi Sport Complex

13 September 2015; Iran vs India – Presidential Cup	Iran	10-11	India	Azadi Sport Complex
