= Colorado Springs Sky Sox =

- 1988–2018; Colorado Springs, Colorado
Team logo
Cap insignia

Minor league affiliations
- Class: Triple-A (1988–2018)
- League: Pacific Coast League (1988–2018)

Major league affiliations
- Team: Milwaukee Brewers (2015–2018); Colorado Rockies (1993–2014); Cleveland Indians (1988–1992)

Minor league titles
- League titles (2): 1992; 1995
- Division titles (3): 1992; 1995; 2017

Team data
- Name: Colorado Springs Sky Sox (1988–2018)
- Colors: Navy, light blue, red, gray, white
- Mascot: Sox the Fox
- Ballpark: Security Service Field (1988–2018); Spurgeon Stadium (1988)

The Colorado Springs Sky Sox were a Minor League Baseball team in Colorado Springs, Colorado. The team played in the Pacific Coast League (PCL) and was the Triple-A affiliate of the Milwaukee Brewers (2015–2018), Colorado Rockies (1993–2014), and Cleveland Indians (1988–1992). The Sky Sox won the PCL title in 1992 and 1995.

== History ==
From 1950 to 1958, the original incarnation of the Colorado Springs Sky Sox were a Class A affiliate of the Chicago White Sox in the Western League. The Sky Sox's nickname originated with their affiliation with the White Sox. The Pikes Peak region was without professional baseball for 30 years until 1988, when the Hawaii Islanders of the PCL relocated to Colorado Springs and became the second incarnation of the Sky Sox. From 1988 to 1992 the Sky Sox were the Triple-A affiliate of the Cleveland Indians. When Denver was awarded a major league franchise for the 1993 season, the new Colorado Rockies arranged for the Sky Sox to become their top farm team.

During their first season, the Sky Sox moved from Spurgeon Stadium (in Memorial Park) to the brand new Sky Sox Stadium, later known as Security Service Field. The ballpark, on the eastern edge of Colorado Springs, cost US$3.4 million to build and held 8,500 spectators. In later years, the Sky Sox invested over $8 million in ballpark renovations which included a new video scoreboard, redesigned entrance plaza, new picnic facility and banquet hall. It has the highest elevation of any professional ballpark in the United States: its natural grass field sits at 6,531 feet (1,991 m) above sea level.

On June 21, 2017, team owner David G. Elmore of the Elmore Sports Group announced the relocation of the Sky Sox Triple-A franchise to San Antonio, Texas, in 2019, with the team continuing to compete in the Pacific Coast League as the San Antonio Missions, who were previously members of the Double-A Texas League. Concurrent with this move, the Rookie Helena Brewers of the Pioneer League relocated to Colorado Springs, operating as the Rocky Mountain Vibes.

In June 2025, the Northern Colorado Owlz of the Pioneer League folded operations with the league replacing them for the remainder of the 2025 season with a team branded as the latest incarnation of the Colorado Springs Sky Sox. The new team was established in Colorado Springs, sharing facilities with the Rocky Mountain Vibes at their blocktickets PARK.

== Notable alumni ==
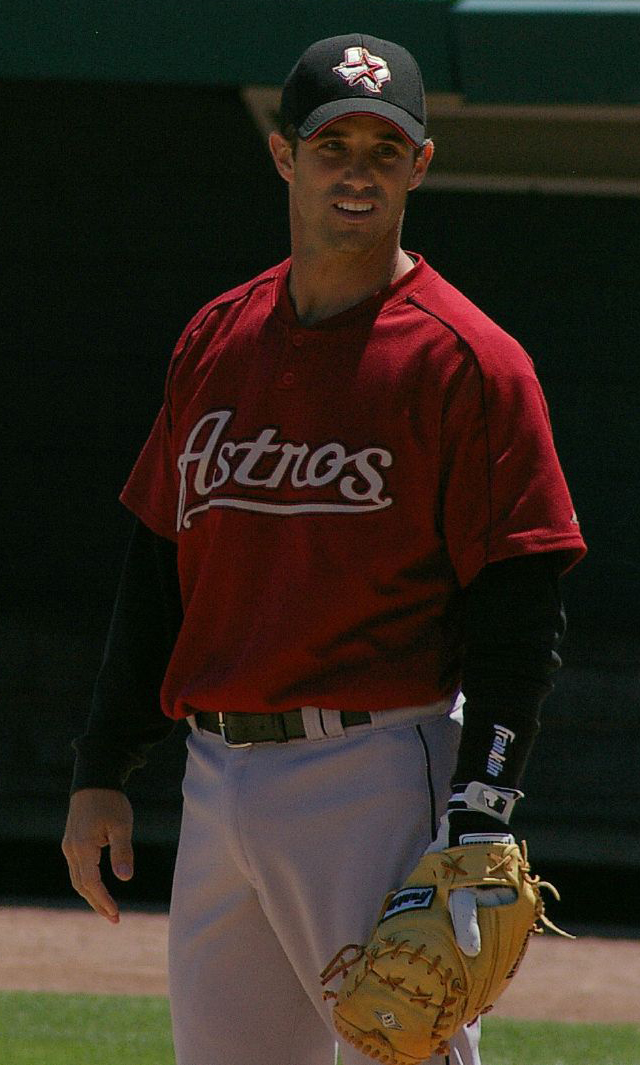
Brad Ausmus

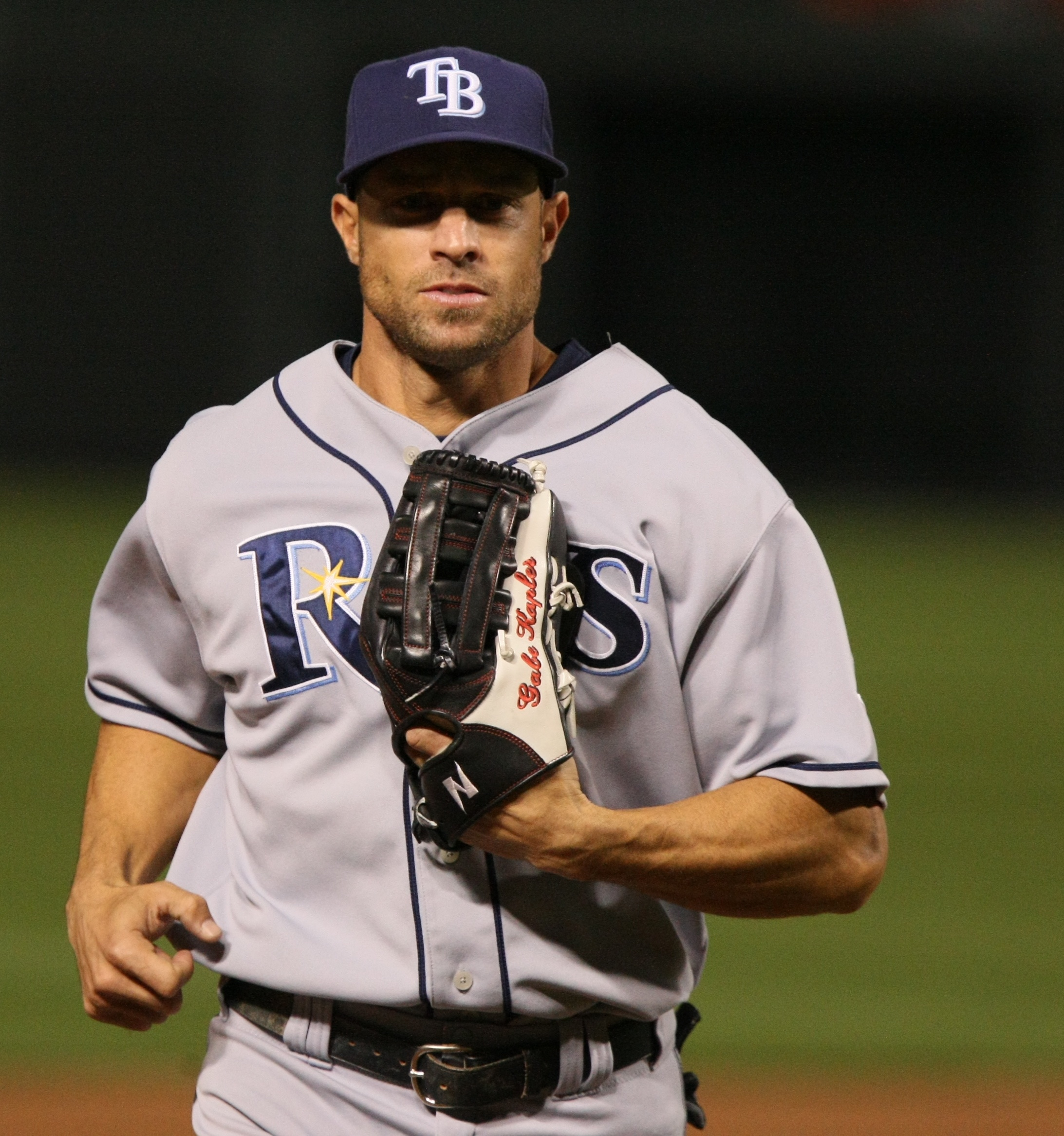
Gabe Kapler

- Sandy Alomar Jr.
- Nolan Arenado
- Garrett Atkins
- Brad Ausmus
- Albert Belle
- Vinny Castilla
- Alan Cockrell
- Craig Counsell
- Joe Girardi
- Jimmy Gobble
- Carlos González
- Brad Hawpe
- Todd Helton
- Matt Holliday
- Doug Jones
- Gabe Kapler
- Juan Pierre
- Scott Podsednik
- Jim Thome
- Mike Hargrove (manager)
- Charlie Manuel (manager)
- Alan Roach (PA announcer)
