= 2019 Asian Baseball Championship =

Tournament details
- Country: Taiwan
- Dates: October 14–20, 2019
- Teams: 8
- Defending champions: Japan

Final positions
- Champions: Chinese Taipei (5th title)
- Runners-up: Japan
- Third place: China
- Fourth place: South Korea

The 29th Asian Baseball Championship was the international baseball competition for Asian men's national teams. It was held in Taichung and Yunlin, Taiwan, on October 14 to 20, 2019. Chinese Taipei and China, the top two finishers, excluding Japan, qualified to compete in the Olympic Final Qualifying Tournament which will take place in March or April 2020.

== Qualified teams ==
- Chinese Taipei – Host
- Japan
- South Korea
- China
- Hong Kong
- Philippines - 2018 East Asia Cup winner
- Pakistan - 2018 West Asia Cup finalist
- Sri Lanka - 2018 West Asia Cup finalist

== Group stage ==
Qualified to Super round
Qualified to consolation round

The first stage consisted of each team playing against each other team in its group once.

=== Group A ===
Teams	W	L	Pct.	GB	R	RA	HTH
Japan	3	0	1.000	—	32	0	
Chinese Taipei	2	1	.667	1	34	4	
Hong Kong	1	2	.333	2	7	33	
Sri Lanka	0	3	.000	3	1	37	

Date	Local time	Road team	Score	Home team	Inn.	Venue	Game duration	Attendance	Boxscore
October 14	18:30	Hong Kong	2–17	Chinese Taipei	5	Intercontinental Baseball Stadium	1:40	889	
October 15	12:00	Sri Lanka	1–5	Hong Kong		Taichung Baseball Field	2:13	220	
October 15	18:30	Japan	2–0	Chinese Taipei		Douliu Baseball Stadium	2:54	0	
October 16	18:30	Chinese Taipei	17–0	Sri Lanka	5	Douliu Baseball Stadium	1:38	765	
October 16	18:30	Hong Kong	0–15	Japan	5	Taichung Baseball Field	1:41	0	
October 17	12:00	Sri Lanka	0–15	Japan	5	Taichung Baseball Field	1:30	0	

=== Group B ===
Teams	W	L	Pct.	GB	R	RA	HTH (TQB)
China	2	1	.667	—	16	6	1–1
South Korea	2	1	.667	—	28	8	1–1
Philippines	2	1	.667	—	14	12	1–1
Pakistan	0	3	.000	2	2	34	

Date	Local time	Road team	Score	Home team	Inn.	Venue	Game duration	Attendance	Boxscore
October 14	12:00	South Korea	4–5	China	10	Intercontinental Baseball Stadium	3:24	200	
October 14	13:00	Philippines	11–0	Pakistan	7	Taichung Baseball Field	2:30	0	
October 15	12:00	Pakistan	1–12	South Korea	7	Douliu Baseball Stadium	2:17	350	
October 15	18:30	China	0–1	Philippines		Taichung Baseball Field	2:30	0	
October 16	12:00	Philippines	2–12	South Korea	7	Douliu Baseball Stadium	2:20	166	
October 16	12:00	Pakistan	1–11	China	7	Taichung Baseball Field	2:08	250	

== Super round and Consolation ==
=== Consolation ===
Teams	W	L	Pct.	GB	R	RA	HTH
Philippines	4	1	.800	–	31	13	
Hong Kong	2	3	.400	2	24	50	
Sri Lanka	1	4	.200	3	12	45	
Pakistan	0	5	.000	4	10	61	

Date	Local time	Road team	Score	Home team	Inn.	Venue	Game duration	Attendance	Boxscore
October 18	12:00	Sri Lanka	10–1	Pakistan		Taichung Baseball Field	3:04	130	
October 18	18:30	Hong Kong	0–10	Philippines	8	Taichung Baseball Field	2:05	239	
October 19	12:00	Pakistan	7–17	Hong Kong	7	Taichung Baseball Field	2:23	167	
October 19	18:30	Sri Lanka	1–7	Philippines		Taichung Baseball Field	2:23	186	

=== Super round ===
Qualified for gold medal game
Qualified for bronze medal game

Teams	W	L	Pct.	GB	R	RA	HTH
Japan	5	0	1.000	–	54	4	
Chinese Taipei	4	1	.800	1	51	7	
China	2	3	.400	3	19	27	1–1
South Korea	2	3	.400	3	32	26	1–1

Date	Local time	Road team	Score	Home team	Inn.	Venue	Game duration	Attendance	Boxscore
October 18	12:00	China	1–11	Japan	7	Intercontinental Baseball Stadium	2:11	346	
October 18	18:30	South Korea	1–7	Chinese Taipei		Intercontinental Baseball Stadium	3:30	1,250	
October 19	12:00	South Korea	3–11	Japan		Intercontinental Baseball Stadium	3:01	362	
October 19	18:30	Chinese Taipei	10–2	China		Intercontinental Baseball Stadium	3:10	0	

=== Bronze medal game ===
Date	Local time	Road team	Score	Home team	Inn.	Venue	Game duration	Attendance	Boxscore
October 20	12:00	South Korea	6–8	China		Intercontinental Baseball Stadium			

=== Gold medal game ===
Date	Local time	Road team	Score	Home team	Inn.	Venue	Game duration	Attendance	Boxscore
October 20	18:30	Chinese Taipei	5–4	Japan		Intercontinental Baseball Stadium			

=== Final standing ===
Qualification to Olympic Final Qualifying Tournament
Already qualified to 2020 Summer Olympics as hosts

Rank	Team
1st place, gold medalist(s)	Chinese Taipei
2nd place, silver medalist(s)	Japan
3rd place, bronze medalist(s)	China
4	South Korea
5	Philippines
6	Hong Kong
7	Sri Lanka
8	Pakistan

== See also ==
- List of sporting events in Taiwan
