= 2023 CPBL season =

Professional baseball season

34th CPBL season
- League: Chinese Professional Baseball League
- Sport: Baseball
- Duration: April 1 – October 15
- Teams: 5

First half-season
- Season champions: Uni-President Lions

Second half-season
- Season champions: Wei Chuan Dragons

Full season
- Season champions: Wei Chuan Dragons

Taiwan Series
- Champions: Wei Chuan Dragons
- Runners-up: Rakuten Monkeys
- Finals MVP: Hsu Jo-hsi

CPBL seasons
- ← 2022 2024 →

The 2023 Chinese Professional Baseball League season was the 34th season of the Chinese Professional Baseball League (CPBL), based in Taiwan.

== Season schedule ==
The regular season began on 1 April 2023. Teams will play a split-season, with second-half games starting July 14. The CPBL All-Star Game is scheduled for the weekend of July 29–30.

== Standings ==
=== First half standings ===
Team	G	W	T	L	Pct.	GB
Uni-President Lions	60	34	2	24	.586	—
Wei Chuan Dragons	60	30	3	27	.526	3½
Rakuten Monkeys	60	29	3	28	.509	4½
CTBC Brothers	60	28	4	28	.500	5
Fubon Guardians	60	21	4	35	.375	12

=== Second half standings ===
Team	G	W	T	L	Pct.	GB
Wei Chuan Dragons	60	32	2	26	.552	—
Rakuten Monkeys	60	31	1	28	.525	1½
CTBC Brothers	60	29	1	30	.492	3½
Uni-President Lions	60	28	1	31	.475	4½
Fubon Guardians	60	27	1	32	.458	5½

=== Full season standings ===
Team	G	W	T	L	Pct.	GB
Wei Chuan Dragons	120	62	5	53	.539	—
Uni-President Lions	120	62	3	55	.530	1
Rakuten Monkeys	120	60	4	56	.517	2½
CTBC Brothers	120	57	5	58	.496	5
Fubon Guardians	120	48	5	67	.417	14

- Green denotes first-half or second-half champion.
- Yellow denotes clinching playoff qualification as the wild card.

== Playoffs ==
2023 CPBL playoff series			2023 Taiwan Series
			1	Wei Chuan Dragons	4
2	Uni-President Lions	1	3	Rakuten Monkeys	3
3	Rakuten Monkeys	3

=== CPBL Playoff Series ===
The team that won a half starts with a one-win advantage over the team with the best record among non-half winners.

Rakuten Monkeys won the series, 1−3.

Game	Date	Score	Location	Time	Attendance
1	October 28	Rakuten Monkeys – 3, Uni-President Lions – 2	Tainan Municipal Baseball Stadium	3:01	7,132
2	October 29	Uni-President Lions – 2, Rakuten Monkeys– 3	Rakuten Taoyuan Baseball Stadium	3:11	13,532
3	October 30	Rakuten Monkeys – 7, Uni-President Lions – 1	Tainan Municipal Baseball Stadium	3:25	5,065

=== Taiwan Series ===
Wei Chuan Dragons won the series, 4−3.

Game	Date	Score	Location	Time	Attendance
1	November 4	Rakuten Monkeys – 2, Wei Chuan Dragons – 3 (14)	Tianmu Baseball Stadium	5:17	10,000
2	November 5	Rakuten Monkeys – 4, Wei Chuan Dragons – 0 (11)	Tianmu Baseball Stadium	3:46	10,000
3	November 7	Wei Chuan Dragons – 4, Rakuten Monkeys – 7	Rakuten Taoyuan Baseball Stadium	3:51	11,013
4	November 8	Wei Chuan Dragons – 4, Rakuten Monkeys – 1	Rakuten Taoyuan Baseball Stadium	3:35	12,029
5	November 10	Rakuten Monkeys – 11, Wei Chuan Dragons – 0	Tianmu Baseball Stadium	3:23	10,000
6	November 11	Rakuten Monkeys – 0, Wei Chuan Dragons – 2	Tianmu Baseball Stadium	2:41	10,000
7	November 12	Rakuten Monkeys – 3, Wei Chuan Dragons – 6	Tianmu Baseball Stadium	3:19	10,000

== See also ==
- 2023 Major League Baseball season
- 2023 Nippon Professional Baseball season
- 2023 KBO League season
- 2023 Mexican League season
- 2023 Frontier League season
- 2023 Pioneer League season
