= 2023 Asian Baseball Championship =

International baseball tournament

Tournament details
- Country: Taiwan
- Dates: 3–10 December 2023
- Teams: 8
- Defending champions: Chinese Taipei

Final positions
- Champions: Japan (20th title)
- Runners-up: Chinese Taipei
- Third place: South Korea
- Fourth place: Philippines

Tournament statistics
- Games played: 22
- Attendance: 113,810 (5,173 per game)

The 30th Asian Baseball Championship (styled 2023 XXX BFA Asian Baseball Championship) was an international professional baseball competition for Asian men's national teams. It was held in Taiwan (Taipei, New Taipei, and Taichung). It began on 3 December 2023 and ended on 10 December 2023. Japan won the championship, its 20th title.

== Qualification ==
In February 2023, Pakistan and Palestine, as winners and finalists of the 2023 West Asia Baseball Cup title, qualified for the Asian Baseball Championship. In May 2023, the Philippines, Hong Kong and Thailand, as winners and finalists of the 2023 East Asia Baseball Cup title, also qualified for the Championship.

== Tournament format ==
A total of 8 teams entered the tournament, with. The top two finishers of each group will compete in the super round on 8 and 9 December. At the end of the super round, the first and second-placed teams will play for the title and the third and fourth-placed teams will play for Bronze Medal. The Bronze Medal winner, along with the two finalists will qualify for the V WBSC U-23 Baseball World Cup, joining hosts China.

== Teams ==
Group A	Group B
Chinese Taipei; Hong Kong; Palestine; South Korea	Japan; Philippines; Thailand; Pakistan

== First round ==
Taiwan defeated South Korea in the opening game of the tournament at the newly opened Taipei Dome. Pitcher Hsu Jo-Hsi struck out 10 batters in 7 scoreless innings.

=== Group A ===
Pos	Team	Pld	W	L	RF	RA	PCT	GB	Qualification
1	Chinese Taipei (H)	3	3	0	40	2	1.000	—	Super Round
2	South Korea	3	2	1	28	5	.667	1	Super Round
3	Palestine	3	1	2	4	39	.333	2	Placement Round
4	Hong Kong	3	0	3	3	29	.000	3	Placement Round

Source: WBSC
(H) Hosts

3 December; 18:00	South Korea	0–4	Chinese Taipei	Taipei Dome, Taipei; Attendance: 16,647; Umpires: Yasuhiro Shimizu (JPN), Kazuyuki Miura (JPN), Cheung Sui Man (HKG), Sandy Wijaya Kusuma (INA)
3 December; 18:00	LP: Shin Heon-min	Box	WP: Hsu Jo-Hsi	Taipei Dome, Taipei; Attendance: 16,647; Umpires: Yasuhiro Shimizu (JPN), Kazuyuki Miura (JPN), Cheung Sui Man (HKG), Sandy Wijaya Kusuma (INA)

Team	1	2	3	4	5	6	7	8	9	R	H	E
South Korea	0	0	0	0	0	0	0	0	0	0	4	1
Chinese Taipei	0	0	3	1	0	0	0	0	X	4	10	0

4 December; 12:30	Palestine	3–1	Hong Kong	Taichung Intercontinental Baseball Stadium, Taichung; Attendance: 38; Umpires: Chen Te-Jung (TPE), Jan Chung-Chi (TPE), Roland Siacor (PHI), Jirapat Lapikun (THA)
4 December; 12:30	WP: Steven Mufareh; Sv: David Powres	Box	LP: Lam Lai Him	Taichung Intercontinental Baseball Stadium, Taichung; Attendance: 38; Umpires: Chen Te-Jung (TPE), Jan Chung-Chi (TPE), Roland Siacor (PHI), Jirapat Lapikun (THA)

Team	1	2	3	4	5	6	7	8	9	R	H	E
Palestine	0	0	0	0	0	1	0	1	1	3	7	4
Hong Kong	0	0	0	0	0	0	1	0	0	1	6	1

5 December; 12:30	Hong Kong	0–9	South Korea	Taichung Intercontinental Baseball Stadium, Taichung; Attendance: 75; Umpires: Jan Chung-Chi (TPE), Chen Te-Jung (TPE), Chen Chao-Chieh (TPE), Sandy Wijaya Kusuma (INA)
5 December; 12:30	LP: Tsang Kin Nam	Box	WP: Kang Dong-hun	Taichung Intercontinental Baseball Stadium, Taichung; Attendance: 75; Umpires: Jan Chung-Chi (TPE), Chen Te-Jung (TPE), Chen Chao-Chieh (TPE), Sandy Wijaya Kusuma (INA)
5 December; 12:30		Box	HR: Yoo Ro-gyeol	Taichung Intercontinental Baseball Stadium, Taichung; Attendance: 75; Umpires: Jan Chung-Chi (TPE), Chen Te-Jung (TPE), Chen Chao-Chieh (TPE), Sandy Wijaya Kusuma (INA)

Team	1	2	3	4	5	6	7	8	9	R	H	E
Hong Kong	0	0	0	0	0	0	0	0	0	0	4	1
South Korea	0	2	2	0	1	0	3	1	X	9	11	1

5 December; 18:30	Chinese Taipei	19–0 (F/6)	Palestine	Taichung Intercontinental Baseball Stadium, Taichung; Attendance: 2,412; Umpires: Kazuyuki Miura (JPN), Yasuhiro Shimizu (JPN), Jirapat Lapikun (THA), Roland Siacor (PHI)
5 December; 18:30	WP: Wu Yu-Cheng	Box	LP: Yunis Haleem	Taichung Intercontinental Baseball Stadium, Taichung; Attendance: 2,412; Umpires: Kazuyuki Miura (JPN), Yasuhiro Shimizu (JPN), Jirapat Lapikun (THA), Roland Siacor (PHI)
5 December; 18:30	HR: Liao Chien-Fu	Box		Taichung Intercontinental Baseball Stadium, Taichung; Attendance: 2,412; Umpires: Kazuyuki Miura (JPN), Yasuhiro Shimizu (JPN), Jirapat Lapikun (THA), Roland Siacor (PHI)

Team	1	2	3	4	5	6	7	8	9	R	H	E
Chinese Taipei	3	2	7	2	0	5	–	–	–	19	12	0
Palestine	0	0	0	0	0	0	–	–	–	0	1	5

6 December; 12:30	Palestine	1–19 (F/5)	South Korea	Taichung Intercontinental Baseball Stadium, Taichung; Attendance: 168; Umpires: Chen Chao-Chieh (TPE), Sandy Wijaya Kusuma (INA), Chen Te-Jung (TPE), Jan Chung-Chi (TPE)
6 December; 12:30	LP: Muhammad Abdelfattah	Box	WP: Lee Byeong-heon	Taichung Intercontinental Baseball Stadium, Taichung; Attendance: 168; Umpires: Chen Chao-Chieh (TPE), Sandy Wijaya Kusuma (INA), Chen Te-Jung (TPE), Jan Chung-Chi (TPE)

Team	1	2	3	4	5	R	H	E
Palestine	0	0	0	1	0	1	1	6
South Korea	0	2	11	6	X	19	8	1

6 December; 18:30	Hong Kong	2–17 (F/5)	Chinese Taipei	Taichung Intercontinental Baseball Stadium, Taichung; Attendance: 2,318; Umpires: Yasuhiro Shimizu (JPN), Kazuyuki Miura (JPN), Roland Siacor (PHI), Jirapat Lapikun (THA)
6 December; 18:30	LP: Lam Lai Him	Box	WP: Lai Yan-Fong	Taichung Intercontinental Baseball Stadium, Taichung; Attendance: 2,318; Umpires: Yasuhiro Shimizu (JPN), Kazuyuki Miura (JPN), Roland Siacor (PHI), Jirapat Lapikun (THA)
6 December; 18:30		Box	HR: Liu Ji-Hong	Taichung Intercontinental Baseball Stadium, Taichung; Attendance: 2,318; Umpires: Yasuhiro Shimizu (JPN), Kazuyuki Miura (JPN), Roland Siacor (PHI), Jirapat Lapikun (THA)

Team	1	2	3	4	5	6	7	8	9	R	H	E
Hong Kong	1	0	0	1	0	–	–	–	–	2	5	3
Chinese Taipei	2	2	2	8	3	–	–	–	–	17	17	0

=== Group B ===
Pos	Team	Pld	W	L	RF	RA	PCT	GB	Qualification
1	Japan	3	3	0	39	1	1.000	—	Super Round
2	Philippines	3	2	1	19	15	.667	1	Super Round
3	Pakistan	3	1	2	6	19	.333	2	Placement Round
4	Thailand	3	0	3	5	34	.000	3	Placement Round

Source: WBSC

4 December; 12:30	Thailand	4–14 (F/7)	Philippines	Taipei Dome, Taipei; Attendance: 1,422; Umpires: Park Wonjong (KOR), Hsu Jie (TPE), Hwang Seok-Min (KOR), Chen Chuan-Mu (TPE)
4 December; 12:30	LP: Kiattisak Chutongrat	Box	WP: Vladimir Eguia	Taipei Dome, Taipei; Attendance: 1,422; Umpires: Park Wonjong (KOR), Hsu Jie (TPE), Hwang Seok-Min (KOR), Chen Chuan-Mu (TPE)

Team	1	2	3	4	5	6	7	8	9	R	H	E
Thailand	0	0	0	0	0	0	4	–	–	4	2	3
Philippines	2	0	2	1	1	3	5	–	–	14	10	2

4 December; 18:30	Pakistan	0–14 (F/7)	Japan	Taipei Dome, Taipei; Attendance: 6,178; Umpires: Tim Wen (TPE), Lin Hsing-Feng (TPE), Chen Tsung-Hsin (TPE), Raymond Cheung (HKG)
4 December; 18:30	LP: Musharaf Khan	Box	WP: Mizuki Kato	Taipei Dome, Taipei; Attendance: 6,178; Umpires: Tim Wen (TPE), Lin Hsing-Feng (TPE), Chen Tsung-Hsin (TPE), Raymond Cheung (HKG)

Team	1	2	3	4	5	6	7	8	9	R	H	E
Pakistan	0	0	0	0	0	0	0	–	–	0	3	0
Japan	0	1	2	3	8	0	X	–	–	14	14	1

5 December; 12:30	Pakistan	2–4	Philippines	Taipei Dome, Taipei; Attendance: 806; Umpires: Hsu Jie (TPE), Raymond Cheung (HKG), Park Won-jong (KOR), Tim Wen (TPE)
5 December; 12:30	LP: Muhammad Zohaib	Box	WP: Romeo Jasmin Jr.	Taipei Dome, Taipei; Attendance: 806; Umpires: Hsu Jie (TPE), Raymond Cheung (HKG), Park Won-jong (KOR), Tim Wen (TPE)

Team	1	2	3	4	5	6	7	8	9	R	H	E
Pakistan	0	0	0	0	0	0	0	2	0	2	4	0
Philippines	0	0	2	0	0	0	0	2	X	4	7	1

5 December; 18:30	Japan	16–0 (F/5)	Thailand	Taipei Dome, Taipei; Attendance: 6,614; Umpires: Hwang Seok-Min (KOR), Chen Chuan-Mu (TPE), Chen Tsung-Hsin (TPE), Lin Hsing-Feng (TPE)
5 December; 18:30	WP: Sho Akiyama	Box	LP: Suppakorn Lin	Taipei Dome, Taipei; Attendance: 6,614; Umpires: Hwang Seok-Min (KOR), Chen Chuan-Mu (TPE), Chen Tsung-Hsin (TPE), Lin Hsing-Feng (TPE)

Team	1	2	3	4	5	6	7	8	9	R	H	E
Japan	1	5	0	4	6	–	–	–	–	16	9	0
Thailand	0	0	0	0	0	–	–	–	–	0	0	3

6 December; 12:30	Thailand	1–4	Pakistan	Taipei Dome, Taipei; Attendance: 2,004; Umpires: Chen Tsung-Hsin (TPE), Chen Chuan-Mu (TPE), Hsu Jie (TPE), Park Won-jong (KOR)
6 December; 12:30	LP: Suppakorn Lin	Box	WP: Musharaf Khan	Taipei Dome, Taipei; Attendance: 2,004; Umpires: Chen Tsung-Hsin (TPE), Chen Chuan-Mu (TPE), Hsu Jie (TPE), Park Won-jong (KOR)

Team	1	2	3	4	5	6	7	8	9	R	H	E
Thailand	0	0	0	0	0	1	0	0	0	1	4	2
Pakistan	1	1	0	0	1	0	0	1	x	4	6	2

6 December; 18:30	Philippines	1–9	Japan	Taipei Dome, Taipei; Attendance: 9,624; Umpires: Lin Hsing-Feng (TPE), Tim Wen (TPE), Raymond Cheung (HKG), Hwang Seok-Min (KOR)
6 December; 18:30	LP: Junmar Diarao	Box	WP: Hiroki Suzuki	Taipei Dome, Taipei; Attendance: 9,624; Umpires: Lin Hsing-Feng (TPE), Tim Wen (TPE), Raymond Cheung (HKG), Hwang Seok-Min (KOR)

Team	1	2	3	4	5	6	7	8	9	R	H	E
Philippines	0	0	0	0	1	0	0	0	0	1	7	2
Japan	1	0	3	0	1	0	0	4	X	9	10	0

== Placement round ==
Pos	Team	Pld	W	L	RF	RA	PCT	GB
1	Pakistan (Note: Pakistan: 1W–1L TQB +0.5000 Hong Kong: 1W–1L TQB -0.0556 Palestine: 1W–1L TQB -0.4314)	3	2	1	21	10	.667	—
2	Hong Kong	3	2	1	19	18	.667	—
3	Palestine	3	2	1	10	13	.667	—
4	Thailand	3	0	3	11	20	.000	2

Source: WBSC
Notes:

8 December; 12:30	Hong Kong	12–10	Thailand	Xinzhuang Baseball Stadium, New Taipei City; Attendance: 41; Umpires: Chen Chuan-Mu (TPE), Hsu Jie (TPE), Yasuhiro Shimizu (JPN), Roland Siacor (PHI)
8 December; 12:30	WP: Sam Leung Ka Ho	Box	LP: Suppakorn Lin	Xinzhuang Baseball Stadium, New Taipei City; Attendance: 41; Umpires: Chen Chuan-Mu (TPE), Hsu Jie (TPE), Yasuhiro Shimizu (JPN), Roland Siacor (PHI)
8 December; 12:30		Box	HR: Joe Daru	Xinzhuang Baseball Stadium, New Taipei City; Attendance: 41; Umpires: Chen Chuan-Mu (TPE), Hsu Jie (TPE), Yasuhiro Shimizu (JPN), Roland Siacor (PHI)

Team	1	2	3	4	5	6	7	8	9	R	H	E
Hong Kong	3	0	1	0	4	1	0	0	3	12	11	3
Thailand	1	0	1	1	0	0	0	5	2	10	9	5

8 December; 18:30	Palestine	3–12	Pakistan	Xinzhuang Baseball Stadium, New Taipei City; Attendance: 82; Umpires: Chen Tsung-Hsin (TPE), Lin Hsing-Feng (TPE), Tim Wen (TPE), Jirapat Lapikun (THA)
8 December; 18:30	LP: Ibrahim Shalabi	Box	WP: Amaan Jan Khan	Xinzhuang Baseball Stadium, New Taipei City; Attendance: 82; Umpires: Chen Tsung-Hsin (TPE), Lin Hsing-Feng (TPE), Tim Wen (TPE), Jirapat Lapikun (THA)

Team	1	2	3	4	5	6	7	8	9	R	H	E
Palestine	0	0	1	0	0	0	0	2	0	3	6	3
Pakistan	0	0	3	0	1	2	4	2	X	12	10	2

9 December; 12:30	Hong Kong	6–5	Pakistan	Xinzhuang Baseball Stadium, New Taipei City; Attendance: 92; Umpires: Jan Chung-Chi (TPE), Chen Tsung-Hsin (TPE), Lin Hsing-Feng (TPE), Jirapat Lapikun (THA)
9 December; 12:30	WP: Lam Lai Him	Box	LP: Jibran Aman Murtaza	Xinzhuang Baseball Stadium, New Taipei City; Attendance: 92; Umpires: Jan Chung-Chi (TPE), Chen Tsung-Hsin (TPE), Lin Hsing-Feng (TPE), Jirapat Lapikun (THA)
9 December; 12:30		Box	HR: Wasim Akram	Xinzhuang Baseball Stadium, New Taipei City; Attendance: 92; Umpires: Jan Chung-Chi (TPE), Chen Tsung-Hsin (TPE), Lin Hsing-Feng (TPE), Jirapat Lapikun (THA)

Team	1	2	3	4	5	6	7	8	9	R	H	E
Hong Kong	0	0	0	0	0	3	0	0	3	6	12	3
Pakistan	2	0	1	0	0	0	0	0	2	5	7	0

9 December; 18:30	Thailand	0–4	Palestine	Xinzhuang Baseball Stadium, New Taipei City; Attendance: 100; Umpires: Raymond Cheung (HKG), Chen Chuan-Mu (TPE), Chen Chao-Chieh (TPE), Roland Siacor (PHI)
9 December; 18:30	LP: Phanuwat Sukmuang	Box	WP: Steven Mufareh	Xinzhuang Baseball Stadium, New Taipei City; Attendance: 100; Umpires: Raymond Cheung (HKG), Chen Chuan-Mu (TPE), Chen Chao-Chieh (TPE), Roland Siacor (PHI)

Team	1	2	3	4	5	6	7	8	9	R	H	E
Thailand	0	0	0	0	0	0	0	0	0	0	6	1
Palestine	0	0	0	0	0	3	1	0	X	4	6	1

== Super round ==
Pos	Team	Pld	W	L	RF	RA	PCT	GB	Qualification
1	Japan	3	3	0	15	3	1.000	—	Gold Medal
2	Chinese Taipei (H)	3	2	1	6	2	.667	1	Gold Medal
3	South Korea	3	1	2	10	11	.333	2	Bronze Medal
4	Philippines	3	0	3	4	19	.000	3	Bronze Medal

Source: WBSC
(H) Hosts

8 December; 12:30	Philippines	2–8	South Korea	Taipei Dome, Taipei; Attendance: 763; Umpires: Chen Te-Jung (TPE), Chen Chao-Chieh (TPE), Jan Chung-Chi (TPE), Kazuyuki Miura (JPN)
8 December; 12:30	LP: Kennedy Torres	Box	WP: Shin Heon-min	Taipei Dome, Taipei; Attendance: 763; Umpires: Chen Te-Jung (TPE), Chen Chao-Chieh (TPE), Jan Chung-Chi (TPE), Kazuyuki Miura (JPN)

Team	1	2	3	4	5	6	7	8	9	R	H	E
Philippines	0	0	0	2	0	0	0	0	0	2	4	6
South Korea	2	0	0	2	1	0	3	1	X	8	9	1

8 December; 18:30	Japan	1–0 (F/10)	Chinese Taipei	Taipei Dome, Taipei; Attendance: 15,544; Umpires: Park Won-jong (KOR), Hwang Seok-Min (KOR), Raymond Cheung (HKG), Sandy Wijaya Kusuma (INA)
8 December; 18:30	WP: Yoshiki Fuchigami	Box	LP: Wang Cheng-Hao	Taipei Dome, Taipei; Attendance: 15,544; Umpires: Park Won-jong (KOR), Hwang Seok-Min (KOR), Raymond Cheung (HKG), Sandy Wijaya Kusuma (INA)

Team	1	2	3	4	5	6	7	8	9	10	R	H	E
Japan	0	0	0	0	0	0	0	0	0	1	1	8	0
Chinese Taipei	0	0	0	0	0	0	0	0	0	0	0	5	2

9 December; 12:30	South Korea	2–5	Japan	Taipei Dome, Taipei; Attendance: 8,563; Umpires: Hsu Jie (TPE), Tim Wen (TPE), Chen Te-Jung (TPE), Sandy Wijaya Kusuma (INA)
9 December; 12:30	LP: Lee Byeong-heon	Box	WP: Sho Akiyama; Sv: Tetsuyuki Fujimura	Taipei Dome, Taipei; Attendance: 8,563; Umpires: Hsu Jie (TPE), Tim Wen (TPE), Chen Te-Jung (TPE), Sandy Wijaya Kusuma (INA)
9 December; 12:30	HR: Kim Beom-seok	Box		Taipei Dome, Taipei; Attendance: 8,563; Umpires: Hsu Jie (TPE), Tim Wen (TPE), Chen Te-Jung (TPE), Sandy Wijaya Kusuma (INA)

Team	1	2	3	4	5	6	7	8	9	R	H	E
South Korea	0	0	0	0	1	0	0	1	0	2	8	1
Japan	0	0	2	2	0	0	0	1	X	5	10	0

9 December; 18:30	Philippines	1–2	Chinese Taipei	Taipei Dome, Taipei; Attendance: 16,298; Umpires: Kazuyuki Miura (JPN), Park Won-jong (KOR), Hwang Seok-Min (KOR), Yasuhiro Shimizu (JPN)
9 December; 18:30	LP: Juan Paulo Macasaet	Box	WP: Wu Yu-Cheng; Sv: Li Tzu-Chiang	Taipei Dome, Taipei; Attendance: 16,298; Umpires: Kazuyuki Miura (JPN), Park Won-jong (KOR), Hwang Seok-Min (KOR), Yasuhiro Shimizu (JPN)

Team	1	2	3	4	5	6	7	8	9	R	H	E
Philippines	0	0	0	0	0	0	0	1	0	1	5	1
Chinese Taipei	0	0	0	0	0	2	0	0	X	2	5	0

== Bronze medal game ==
10 December; 12:30	Philippines	0–7	South Korea	Taipei Dome, Taipei; Attendance: 3,008; Umpires: Tim Wen (TPE), Kazuyuki Miura (JPN), Chen Te-Jung (TPE), Hsu Jie (TPE)
10 December; 12:30	LP: Romeo Jasmin Jr.	Box	WP: Kim Dong-hyeok	Taipei Dome, Taipei; Attendance: 3,008; Umpires: Tim Wen (TPE), Kazuyuki Miura (JPN), Chen Te-Jung (TPE), Hsu Jie (TPE)

Team	1	2	3	4	5	6	7	8	9	R	H	E
Philippines	0	0	0	0	0	0	0	0	0	0	2	0
South Korea	1	0	0	1	0	0	5	0	X	7	9	0

== Gold medal game ==
10 December; 18:30	Chinese Taipei	0–1	Japan	Taipei Dome, Taipei; Attendance: 21,013; Umpires: Hwang Seok-Min (KOR), Park Won-jong (KOR), Raymond Cheung (HKG), Sandy Wijaya Kusuma (INA)
10 December; 18:30	LP: Hsu Jo-Hsi	Box	WP: Mizuki Kato; Sv: Shuichiro Kayo	Taipei Dome, Taipei; Attendance: 21,013; Umpires: Hwang Seok-Min (KOR), Park Won-jong (KOR), Raymond Cheung (HKG), Sandy Wijaya Kusuma (INA)

Team	1	2	3	4	5	6	7	8	9	R	H	E
Chinese Taipei	0	0	0	0	0	0	0	0	0	0	7	1
Japan	0	0	1	0	0	0	0	0	X	1	5	1

== Final standings ==
The Baseball Federation of Asia (BFA) has published the Final Ranking at the conclusion of the tournament.

Rank	Team	Pld	W	L
1st place, gold medalist(s)	Japan	6	6	0
2nd place, silver medalist(s)	Chinese Taipei	6	4	2
3rd place, bronze medalist(s)	South Korea	6	4	2
4	Philippines	6	2	4
5	Pakistan	5	2	3
6	Hong Kong	5	2	3
7	Palestine	5	2	3
8	Thailand	5	0	5

Qualified for 2024 U-23 Baseball World Cup

== Awards ==
The BFA announced the winners of Individual Awards, as well as the tournament's All-Star Team.

All-Star Team
Position	Player
Starting Pitcher	(Japan) Shuichiro Kayo
Relief Pitcher	(South Korea) Jo Byeong-hyeon
Catcher	(Philippines) Mark Steven Manaig
First Baseman	(Chinese Taipei) Iyang Namoh
Second Baseman	(Japan) Yukiya Yano
Third Baseman	(Chinese Taipei) Liu Ji-Hong
Shortstop	(Chinese Taipei) Lin Chen-Fei
Outfielders	(Philippines) Erwin Bosito (Chinese Taipei) Chen Hsiao-Yun (Japan) Motoki Mukoyama
Designated Hitter	(South Korea) Kim Beom-seok

Individual Awards
Award	Player	Value
Most Valuable Player	(Japan) Motoki Mukoyama	
Leading Hitter (Best Batting Average)	(Hong Kong) Jordan Wen Tsz Yin	0.500
Pitcher with the Best ERA	(Palestine) Steven Mufareh	0.00; 13.0 IP
Pitcher with the Best Win/Loss Average	(Palestine) Steven Mufareh	2; 13.0 IP
Most Runs Batted In (RBI)	(Japan) Motoki Mukoyama	9
Most Home Runs	(Thailand) Joe Daru	1 PA-(BB+HP)=12
Most Stolen Bases	(South Korea) Jeong Jun-jae	7
Most Runs Scored	(Japan) Yukiya Yano	9
Best Defensive Player	(Chinese Taipei) Lin Ching-Kai	

== See also ==
- List of sporting events in Taiwan
