= Baseball in India =

- Country: India
- Governing body: Amateur Baseball Federation of India
- National teams: Men; Women
- First played: Early 1940s

National competitions
- National Baseball Championship

International competitions
- Asian Baseball Championship; Asian Baseball Cup; Women's Baseball World Cup

Baseball is played in local clubs, schools and at the university level in India.

== History ==
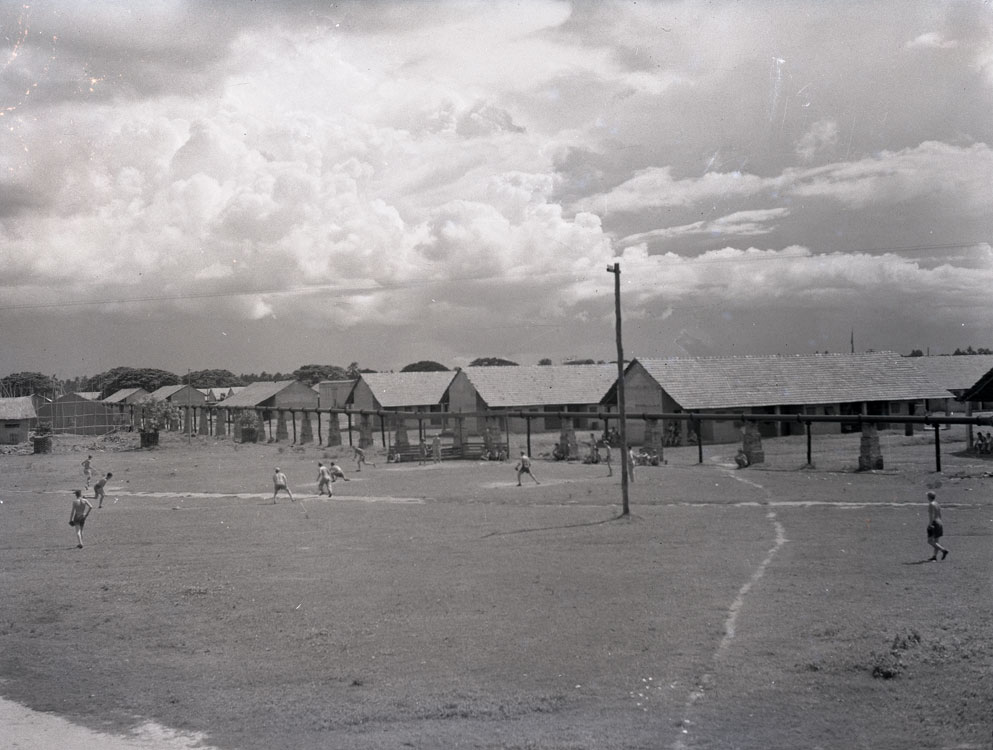
1944 U.S. military game in the Alipore, Kolkata air base

Baseball was played in Manipur as early as World War II when the US Army Air Force flew supplies to China over the Himalayas, known as "Flying the Hump", and the locals learned the game from the troops stationed there.

The Amateur Baseball Federation of India was founded in 1983 and India's first national baseball championship occurred in 1985, taking place in New Delhi. That same year, it joined both the International Baseball Federation along with the Baseball Federation of Asia. In 2006, MLB International sent Envoy coaches to India to train local coaches and players in partnership with First Pitch, an India-based grass-roots baseball organisation.

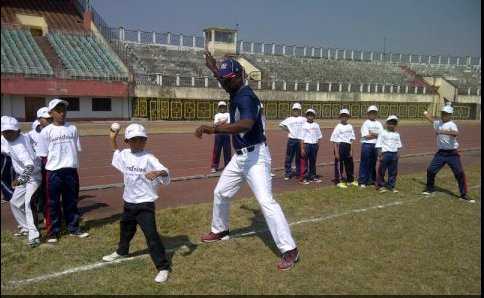
Kids learning baseball as part of an American State Department program

The first ballpark in India was opened on 5 February 2017 at a farmhouse on the Gurgaon-Delhi border by Grand Slam Baseball and recognised by WBSC President Riccardo Fraccari. Built by social entrepreneur and baseball enthusiast Raunaq Sahni, India's first and only regulation-size baseball ground is named Field of Dreams in homage to the 1989 American film of the same name. Sahni had set up Grand Slam Baseball in 2013 as a grass-roots sports initiative to help organise tournaments and coaching programmes for youths across the country. Before the birth of Grand Slam Baseball, the sport was mostly played among expats and among government school players. Grand Slam Baseball changed this by starting pay-for-play programmes at elite private schools in Delhi-NCR while also sponsoring an equal number of government school players.

In July 2019, Major League Baseball (MLB) announced plans to open an office in New Delhi to promote the growth of baseball in India. The league also announced to plans to stream one regular season game a week on Facebook in India. MLB also stated that it would relaunch Million Dollar Arm holding tryouts in India between September and December 2019. MLB also announced the launch of First Pitch, a grassroots program for primary school children from 300 schools across New Delhi, Bangalore and Mumbai to learn baseball through workshops by MLB coaches. MLB has said that there may be collaboration with BCCI to increase the spread of both cricket and baseball.

== Million Dollar Arm ==
In 2007, struggling MLB agent J.B. Bernstein decided to start a competition in India titled Million Dollar Arm, a talent search for the best throwing arms in India. He gained his inspiration after watching ESPN's broadcast of a cricket match featuring bowlers that bowled at speeds as high as 150 km/h (93 mph) and realising that India was one of the largest untapped environments for baseball. Despite being inspired by cricketers, the two winners were 19-year-old javelin throwers Rinku Singh and Dinesh Patel. Although he did not reach the million-dollar mark, Singh won US$100,000 for the fastest delivery of the contest and Patel won US$5,000. They were also invited to the United States to train and try out for Major League Baseball (MLB) teams. Eventually, both pitchers were signed by the Pittsburgh Pirates organisation and became the first two Indians to play professional baseball.

Patel ended up having a successful 2009 season for Pirates' Gulf Coast League team, finishing with a 1–0 record and a 1.42 ERA in 6 1/3 innings pitched. His 2010 season was not successful, with his ERA going up to 8.59 in 7 1/3 innings. He was released after the season and returned to India to teach baseball and prepare kids for subsequent seasons of Million Dollar Arm.

The screen rights to their story were purchased in 2009, and in 2014 Disney released the film titled Million Dollar Arm. It made $3.9 crore off a budget of $2.5 crore.

== See also ==
- Baseball United, a Middle Eastern and South Asian baseball league
- Baseball5 in India
- Softball in India
