= 2025 West Asia Baseball Cup =

2024 West Asia Baseball Cup
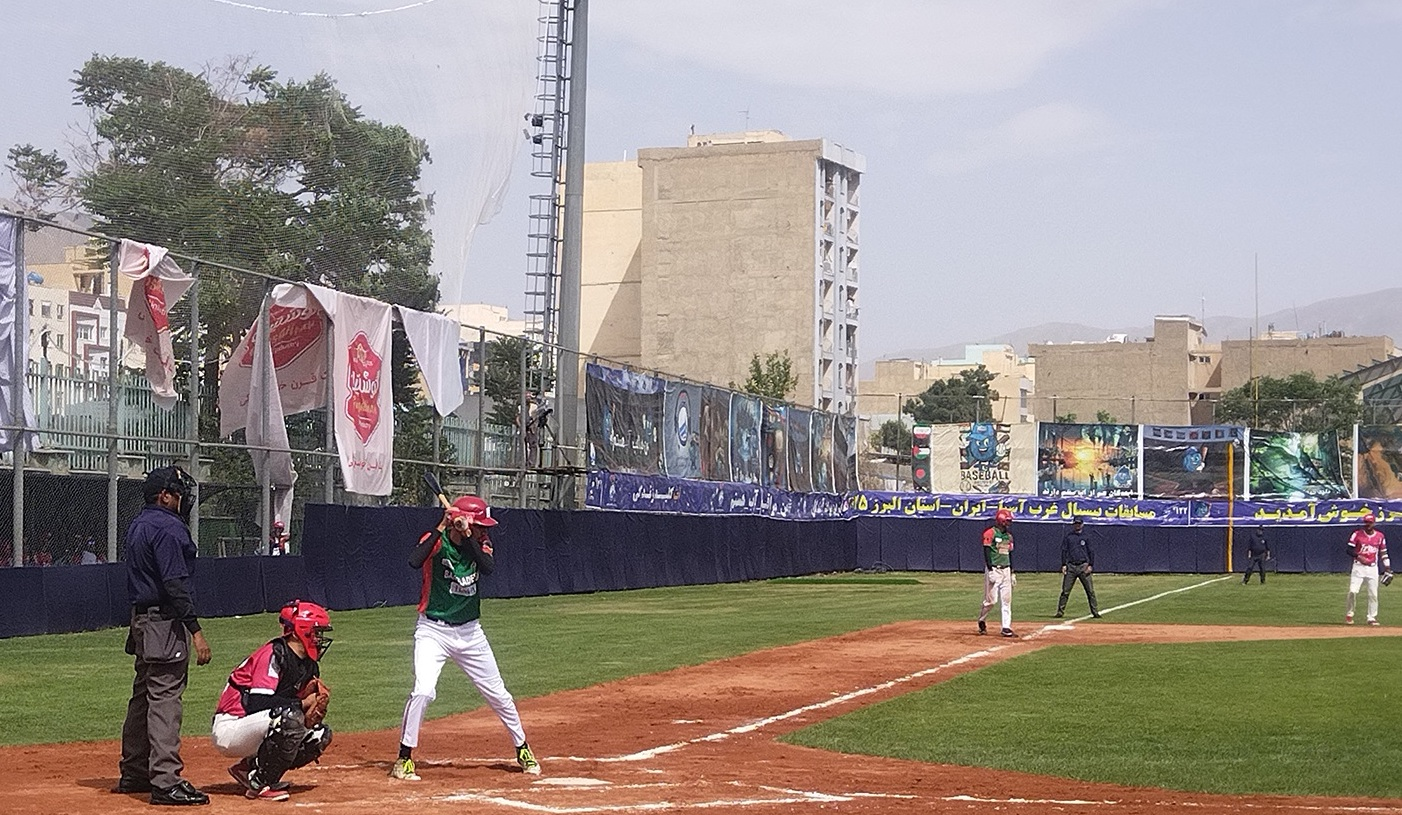
- Bangladesh bats against Iran on May 16

Tournament details
- Country: Iran
- City: Karaj
- Dates: May 15–21
- Teams: 7

Final positions
- Champions: Palestine
- Runners-up: Pakistan
- Third place: Iran
- Fourth place: India

The 2025 West Asia Baseball Cup was the 16th edition of the tournament, held in Karaj, Iran from May 1–8, 2025. Karaj was previously awarded the 2021 West Asia Baseball Cup before it was cancelled due to the COVID-19 pandemic.

The tournament was initially scheduled to be held in October 2024 in Pakistan. Pakistan was confirmed as host during a meeting in Taiwan in May 2024, with five teams expected to participate. However, Pakistan and several other West Asian national baseball teams instead participated in the Baseball United Arab Classic, held in November 2024 in Dubai.

The tournament was won by Palestine, their first ever international title.

== Participants ==
- Pakistan (38)
- Palestine (46)
- Sri Lanka (51)
- India (69)
- Bangladesh (61)
- Afghanistan (73)
- Iran No Rank

WBSC World Ranking before the tournament in parentheses

== Venue ==
Karaj, Iran	2025 West Asia Baseball Cup is located in Iran
Iran Baseball and Softball Association Complex	2025 West Asia Baseball Cup is located in Iran
Capacity: 15,000	2025 West Asia Baseball Cup is located in Iran

== Group stage ==
=== Group A ===
Pos	Team	Pld	W	L	RF	RA	RD	PCT	GB
1	Palestine	3	3	0	39	13	+26	1.000	—
2	India	3	2	1	16	12	+4	.667	1
3	Sri Lanka	3	1	2	14	20	−6	.333	2
4	Afghanistan	3	0	3	17	41	−24	.000	3

Source: Baseball Federation of Asia

15 May 2025; 8:30 (UTC+3:30)	India	1–6	Palestine	Iran Baseball and Softball Association Complex, Karaj, Iran

16 May 2025; 8:00 (UTC+3:30)	India	3–2	Sri Lanka	Iran Baseball and Softball Association Complex, Karaj, Iran

16 May 2025; 11:00 (UTC+3:30)	Palestine	22–7 (F/6)	Afghanistan	Iran Baseball and Softball Association Complex, Karaj, Iran

17 May 2025; 13:00 (UTC+3:30)	Afghanistan	6–7	Sri Lanka	Iran Baseball and Softball Association Complex, Karaj, Iran

18 May 2025; 9:00 (UTC+3:30)	Afghanistan	4–12	India	Iran Baseball and Softball Association Complex, Karaj, Iran

18 May 2025; 13:00 (UTC+3:30)	Sri Lanka	5–11	Palestine	Iran Baseball and Softball Association Complex, Karaj, Iran

=== Group B ===
Pos	Team	Pld	W	L	RF	RA	RD	PCT	GB
1	Pakistan	2	2	0	24	6	+18	1.000	—
2	Iran (H)	2	1	1	7	20	−13	.500	1
3	Bangladesh	2	0	2	12	17	−5	.000	2

Source: Baseball Federation of Asia
(H) Hosts

15 May 2025; 13:00 (UTC+3:30)	Bangladesh	6–7	Iran	Iran Baseball and Softball Association Complex, Karaj, Iran

16 May 2025; 14:00 (UTC+3:30)	Pakistan	10–6	Bangladesh	Iran Baseball and Softball Association Complex, Karaj, Iran

17 May 2025; 9:00 (UTC+3:30)	Iran	0–14 (F/7)	Pakistan	Iran Baseball and Softball Association Complex, Karaj, Iran

== Knockout stage ==
=== Placement round ===
Pos	Team	Pld	W	L	RF	RA	RD	PCT	GB
1	Sri Lanka	2	2	0	25	6	+19	1.000	—
2	Bangladesh	2	1	1	21	18	+3	.500	1
3	Afghanistan	2	0	2	6	28	−22	.000	2

Source: Baseball Federation of Asia

19 May 2025; 9:00 (UTC+3:30)	Sri Lanka	18–0 (F/5)	Bangladesh	Iran Baseball and Softball Association Complex, Karaj, Iran

20 May 2025; 9:00 (UTC+3:30)	Bangladesh	21–0 (F/5)	Afghanistan	Iran Baseball and Softball Association Complex, Karaj, Iran

=== Semi-finals ===
Semifinals
Iran	3
Palestine	17
India	1
Pakistan	14

Finals
Pakistan	4
Palestine	5
Third place
India	3
Iran	6

19 May 2025; 14:00 (UTC+3:30)	Iran	3–17 (F/7)	Palestine	Iran Baseball and Softball Association Complex, Karaj, Iran

20 May 2025; 14:00 (UTC+3:30)	India	1–14 (F/7)	Pakistan	Iran Baseball and Softball Association Complex, Karaj, Iran

21 May 2025; 8:00 (UTC+3:30)	India	3–6 (F/7)	Iran	Iran Baseball and Softball Association Complex, Karaj, Iran

21 May 2025; 14:00 (UTC+3:30)	Pakistan	4–5 (F/10)	Palestine	Iran Baseball and Softball Association Complex, Karaj, Iran

== Final standings ==
Rk	Team	W	L
1st place, gold medalist(s)	Palestine	5	0
2nd place, silver medalist(s)	Pakistan	4	1
3rd place, bronze medalist(s)	Iran	2	2
4	India	2	3
5	Sri Lanka	3	2
6	Bangladesh	1	3
7	Afghanistan	0	5

== Statistical leaders ==
=== Batting ===
Stat	Name	Total
AVG	(Bangladesh) Shahid Ahmed	.667
HR	(Palestine) Tariq Suboh	4
RBI	(Palestine) Dylan Ahmed	9
H	(Palestine) Rumsey Yasin	10
H	(Bangladesh) Shahid Ahmed	10
R	(Palestine) Tariq Suboh	10
SB	(Pakistan) Hussain Hussain	10
BB	(Palestine) Yunus Haleem	6
OBP	(Palestine) Shahid Ahmed	.688
SLG	(Palestine) Tariq Suboh	1.053

=== Pitching ===
Stat	Name	Team	Total
W	4 tied with (Note: Paul Baba (PLE), David Powres (PLE), Jayasinha Arachchighe Don Sasika Dulshan (SRI), Syed Muhib Shah (PAK))	2	
CG	(Palestine) David Powres	2	
SO	(India) Akshay More	30	
IP	(India) Akshay More	19.1	
ERA	(Pakistan) Muhammad Haris	0.79	
