= 2015 Asian Baseball Cup =

The 2015 Asian Baseball Cup was an international baseball tournament contested by the men's national teams of WBSC Asia's member associations. It was the 12th edition of the biannual Asian Baseball Cup, and served as qualification to the 2015 Asian Baseball Championship. It was divided into two separate divisions, East and West, alternatively called the 2015 East Asian Baseball Cup and 2015 West Asian Baseball Cup.

The Eastern Division of the tournament was hosted in Jakarta, Indonesia from 3–8 May 2015, while the Western Division was hosted in Islamabad, Pakistan from 23–28 February 2015.

== Participants ==
Eastern Division

- Hong Kong
- Indonesia (host)
- Philippines
- Thailand
- Singapore
- Sri Lanka

Western Division

- India
- Iran
- Iraq
- Pakistan (host)

== Eastern Division ==
2015 Asian Baseball Cup (Eastern Division)

Tournament details
- Country: Indonesia
- City: Jakarta
- Venues: 3
- Dates: 3 – 8 May 2015
- Teams: 6 (from 1 confederation)
- Defending champions: Philippines

Final positions
- Champions: Philippines (4th title)
- Runners-up: Indonesia
- Third place: Sri Lanka
- Fourth place: Hong Kong

Tournament statistics
- Games played: 16

Awards
- MVP: (Philippines) Juan Paulo Macasaet

=== Preliminary round ===
Rk	Team	W	L	HTH	RS	IPO	RA	IPD	TQB
1	Philippines	5	0	−					
2	Indonesia	3	2	1−1	15		11		
3	Sri Lanka	3	2	1−1	10		9		
4	Hong Kong	3	2	1−1	9		14		
5	Thailand	1	4	−					
6	Singapore	0	5	−					

NOTE: Tiebreaker notes: HTH − Head-to-head. RS − Runs scored. IPO − Innings the team batted. RA − Runs against. IPD − Innings the team pitched. TQB − The index of (RS/IPO)−(RA/IPD).

3 May 2015; 08:30	Philippines	4 – 2	Hong Kong	Senayan Field, Jakarta
3 May 2015; 08:30		Boxscore		Senayan Field, Jakarta

3 May 2015; 12:00	Indonesia	19 – 4	Singapore	Senayan Field, Jakarta
3 May 2015; 12:00		Boxscore		Senayan Field, Jakarta

3 May 2015; 15:30	Thailand	postponed	Sri Lanka	Senayan Field, Jakarta

4 May 2015; 09:00	Indonesia	8 – 3	Sri Lanka	Senayan Field 2, Jakarta
4 May 2015; 09:00		Boxscore		Senayan Field 2, Jakarta

4 May 2015; 11:00	Hong Kong	9 – 4	Singapore	Senayan Field 3, Jakarta
4 May 2015; 11:00		Boxscore		Senayan Field 3, Jakarta

4 May 2015; 12:30	Thailand	1 – 10	Philippines	Senayan Field 2, Jakarta
4 May 2015; 12:30		Boxscore		Senayan Field 2, Jakarta

5 May 2015; 09:00	Philippines	2 – 1	Sri Lanka	Senayan Field 2, Jakarta
5 May 2015; 09:00		Boxscore		Senayan Field 2, Jakarta

5 May 2015; 09:00	Singapore	2 – 12	Thailand	Senayan Field 3, Jakarta
5 May 2015; 09:00		Boxscore		Senayan Field 3, Jakarta

5 May 2015; 12:30	Hong Kong	8 – 7	Indonesia	Senayan Field 3, Jakarta
5 May 2015; 12:30		Boxscore		Senayan Field 3, Jakarta

5 May 2015; 13:00	Thailand	3 – 9	Sri Lanka	Senayan Field 2, Jakarta
5 May 2015; 13:00		Boxscore		Senayan Field 2, Jakarta

6 May 2015; 09:00	Philippines	4 – 0	Singapore	Senayan Field 2, Jakarta
6 May 2015; 09:00		Boxscore		Senayan Field 2, Jakarta

6 May 2015; 11:00	Sri Lanka	7 – 1	Hong Kong	Senayan Field 3, Jakarta
6 May 2015; 11:00		Boxscore		Senayan Field 3, Jakarta

6 May 2015; 12:30	Indonesia	9 – 2	Thailand	Senayan Field 2, Jakarta
6 May 2015; 12:30		Boxscore		Senayan Field 2, Jakarta

7 May 2015; 09:00	Thailand	5 – 8	Hong Kong	Senayan Field 2, Jakarta
7 May 2015; 09:00		Boxscore		Senayan Field 2, Jakarta

7 May 2015; 11:00	Indonesia	1 – 9	Philippines	Senayan Field 3, Jakarta
7 May 2015; 11:00		Boxscore		Senayan Field 3, Jakarta

7 May 2015; 12:30	Singapore	0 – 11	Sri Lanka	Senayan Field 2, Jakarta
7 May 2015; 12:30		Boxscore		Senayan Field 2, Jakarta

=== Final ===
8 May 2015; 14:00	Philippines	10 – 0	Indonesia	Senayan Field 2, Jakarta
8 May 2015; 14:00		Boxscore		Senayan Field 2, Jakarta

=== Awards ===
2015 Asian Baseball Cup – Eastern Division Champions

Philippines
4th title

== Western Division ==
2015 Asian Baseball Cup (Western Division)
Tournament details
- Country: Pakistan
- City: Islamabad
- Venue: 1 (in 1 host city)
- Dates: 23 – 27 February 2015
- Teams: 4 (from 1 confederation)
- Defending champions: Pakistan

Final positions
- Champions: Pakistan (4th title)
- Runners-up: Iran
- Third place: India
- Fourth place: Iraq

Tournament statistics
- Games played: 6

Rk	Team	W	L	HTH	RS	IPO	RA	IPD	TQB
1	Pakistan	3	0	−					
2	Iran	2	1	−					
3	India	1	2	−					
4	Iraq	0	3	−					

23 February 2015; 15:00	Pakistan	20 – 0	Iraq	Jinnah Sports Stadium, Islamabad

24 February 2015; 14:00	Iran	15 – 0	India	Jinnah Sports Stadium, Islamabad

26 February 2015; 11:00	India	20 – 0	Iraq	Jinnah Sports Stadium, Islamabad

26 February 2015; 14:00	Pakistan	12 – 0	Iran	Jinnah Sports Stadium, Islamabad

27 February 2015; 08:00	Iran	18 – 4	Iraq	Jinnah Sports Stadium, Islamabad

27 February 2015; 11:00	Pakistan	11 – 0	India	Jinnah Sports Stadium, Islamabad

=== Awards ===
2015 Asian Baseball Cup – Western Division Champions

Pakistan
5th title
