= Amateur Baseball Federation of India =

Governing body of baseball in India

- Sport: Baseball
- Jurisdiction: India
- Membership: 26 state associations
- Abbreviation: ABFI
- Founded: 11 December 1983; 42 years ago
- Affiliation: World Baseball Softball Confederation
- Affiliation date: 1985
- Regional affiliation: WBSC Asia
- Affiliation date: 1985
- Headquarters: Keshav Puram, North West Delhi
- President: Pankaj Lochan Mohanty

Official website
- www.abfi.in
- (India)

The Amateur Baseball Federation of India is the governing body for baseball in India. The ABFI was founded on 11 December 1983 in Rohtak, Haryana, and became a member of the WBSC Asia and the World Baseball Softball Confederation in 1985. The federation was officially recognized as the national governing body of baseball in India by the Union Ministry of Youth Affairs and Sports in 1991, and by the Indian Olympic Association in 2002.

== See also ==
- Baseball in India
- India men's national baseball team
- India women's national baseball team
