= Afghanistan national baseball team =

Information
- Country: Afghanistan
- Federation: Afghanistan Baseball Federation
- Confederation: WBSC Asia

WBSC ranking
- Current: 81 ▼1 (26 March 2026)

The Afghanistan national baseball team is the national baseball team that represents Afghanistan in international competitions and is controlled by the Afghanistan Baseball Federation, which was founded in 2011.

The first official baseball game in Afghanistan was held in Kandahar Province in 2009, although earlier games were organized by the U.S. Army following the 2001 invasion of Afghanistan.

== Tournament history ==
Afghanistan has twice finished third in regional Asian baseball tournaments, beating Nepal in the 2011 SAARC Baseball Championship and 2013 West Asia Baseball Cup.

=== Asia Baseball Cup / West Asia Baseball Cup ===
Year	Host	Record	Rank	Ref.
2010	(Pakistan) Islamabad	0–3	Fourth (out of four teams)	
2012	(Pakistan) Lahore		Fourth (out of four teams)	
2013	(Pakistan) Lahore		Third (out of four teams)	
2023	(Pakistan) Islamabad	0–2	Fifth (tied with two team) (out of seven teams)	
2025	(Iran) Karaj	0–5	Seventh (out of seven teams)	

=== SAARC Baseball Championship ===
Year	Host	Round/Rank	Ref.
2011	(Pakistan) Lahore	Third place	
2013	(Sri Lanka) Homagama		
