= 2023 West Asia Baseball Cup =

Asian Baseball Sports Tournament

Tournament details
- Country: Pakistan
- Venue(s): Pakistan Sports Complex, Islamabad
- Dates: 26 January -1 February
- Teams: 7

Final positions
- Champions: Pakistan (6th title)
- Runners-up: Palestine
- Third place: Sri Lanka
- Fourth place: Bangladesh

Tournament statistics
- Games played: 12

The 2023 West Asian Baseball Cup is the 15th edition of the tournament, held from 26 January to February 1, at the Pakistan Sports Complex in Islamabad, Pakistan.

The 2023 edition of the tournament sees Palestine participating for the first time in the competition.

The tournament was originally scheduled to be held in Iran in 2021, but was delayed due to the COVID-19 pandemic.

== Participants ==
=== Western Division ===
- Afghanistan
- Bangladesh (74)
- India (61)
- Nepal
- Pakistan (43)
- Palestine
- Sri Lanka (45)

Pre-tournament WBSC World Rankings in parentheses

Due to visa issues, it was believed Team India may not participate in the tournament. The issue was resolved on 27 January, but the delay resulted in Team India being forced to forfeit their first match to Palestine.

== Tournament ==
Group A

Rk	Team	W	L	HTH	RS	IPO	RA	IPD	TQB
1	Pakistan	2	0	-					
2	Bangladesh	1	1	−					
3	Afghanistan	0	2	−					

NOTE: Tiebreaker notes: HTH − Head-to-head. RS − Runs scored. IPO − Innings the team batted. RA − Runs against. IPD − Innings the team pitched. TQB − The index of (RS/IPO)−(RA/IPD).

27 January 2023; 09:00	Pakistan	17-0 (F/5)	Afghanistan	Pakistan Sports Complex, Islamabad

28 January 2023; 09:00	Pakistan	16-0 (F/5)	Bangladesh	Pakistan Sports Complex, Islamabad

29 January 2023; 09:00	Bangladesh	12-2 (F/7)	Afghanistan	Pakistan Sports Complex, Islamabad

Group B

Rk	Team	W	L	HTH	RS	IPO	RA	IPD	TQB
1	Palestine	3	0	-					
2	Sri Lanka	2	1	−					
3	India	0	2	−					
4	Nepal	0	2	−					

NOTE: Tiebreaker notes: HTH − Head-to-head. RS − Runs scored. IPO − Innings the team batted. RA − Runs against. IPD − Innings the team pitched. TQB − The index of (RS/IPO)−(RA/IPD).

27 January 2023; 12:00	Sri Lanka	26-0 (F/5)	Nepal	Pakistan Sports Complex, Islamabad

27 January 2023; 15:00	Palestine	WALKOVER	India	Pakistan Sports Complex, Islamabad

28 January 2023; 12:00	Palestine	21-1 (F/5)	Nepal	Pakistan Sports Complex, Islamabad

28 January 2023; 15:00	Sri Lanka	11-2 (F/7)	India	Pakistan Sports Complex, Islamabad

29 January 2023; 12:00	India	15-0 (F/5)	Nepal	Pakistan Sports Complex, Islamabad

29 January 2023; 12:00	Palestine	10-0 (F/5)	Sri Lanka	Pakistan Sports Complex, Islamabad

Semifinal

Rk	Team	W	L	HTH	RS	IPO	RA	IPD	TQB
1	Pakistan	1	0	-					
2	Palestine	1	0	−					
3	Sri Lanka	0	1	−					
4	Bangladesh	0	1	−					

NOTE: Tiebreaker notes: HTH − Head-to-head. RS − Runs scored. IPO − Innings the team batted. RA − Runs against. IPD − Innings the team pitched. TQB − The index of (RS/IPO)−(RA/IPD).

30 January 2023; 10:00	Pakistan	PPD RAIN	Sri Lanka	Pakistan Sports Complex, Islamabad

30 January 2023; 13:00	Palestine	PPD RAIN	Bangladesh	Pakistan Sports Complex, Islamabad

31 January 2023; 10:00	Bangladesh	CANCELLED RAIN	Sri Lanka	Pakistan Sports Complex, Islamabad

31 January 2023; 13:00	Pakistan	CANCELLED RAIN	Palestine	Pakistan Sports Complex, Islamabad

31 January 2023; 10:00	Palestine	14-3 (F/5)	Bangladesh	Pakistan Sports Complex, Islamabad

31 January 2023; 13:00	Pakistan	16-1 (F/4)	Sri Lanka	Pakistan Sports Complex, Islamabad

Playoffs

Third Place Playoff

February 1, 2023 - 10:00

Sri Lanka
3

Bangladesh
1

Final

February 1, 2023 - 13:00

Palestine
3

Pakistan
11

== See also ==
- 2023 East Asian Baseball Cup
