= Blocktickets Park =

Baseball park in the western United States

blocktickets PARK
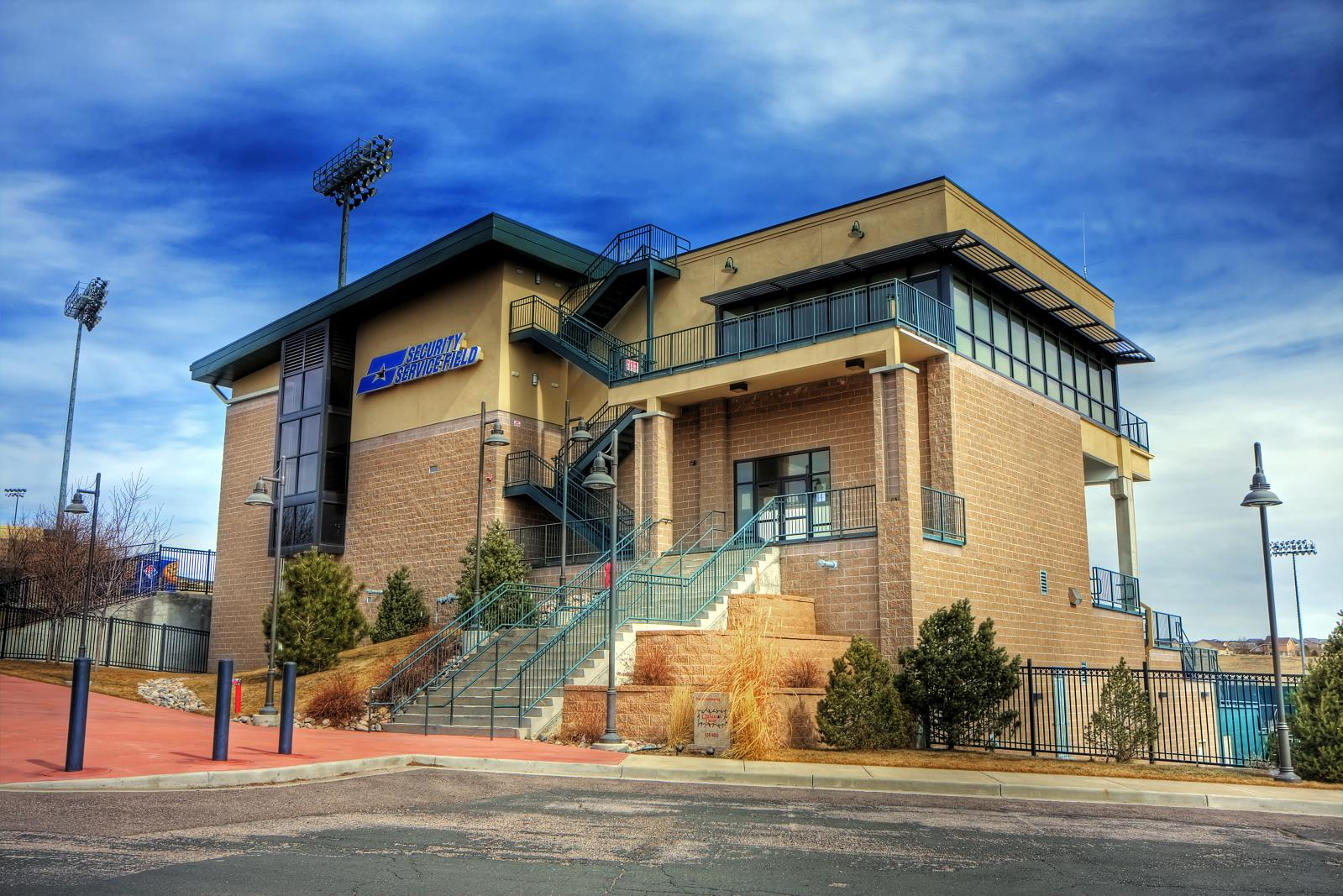
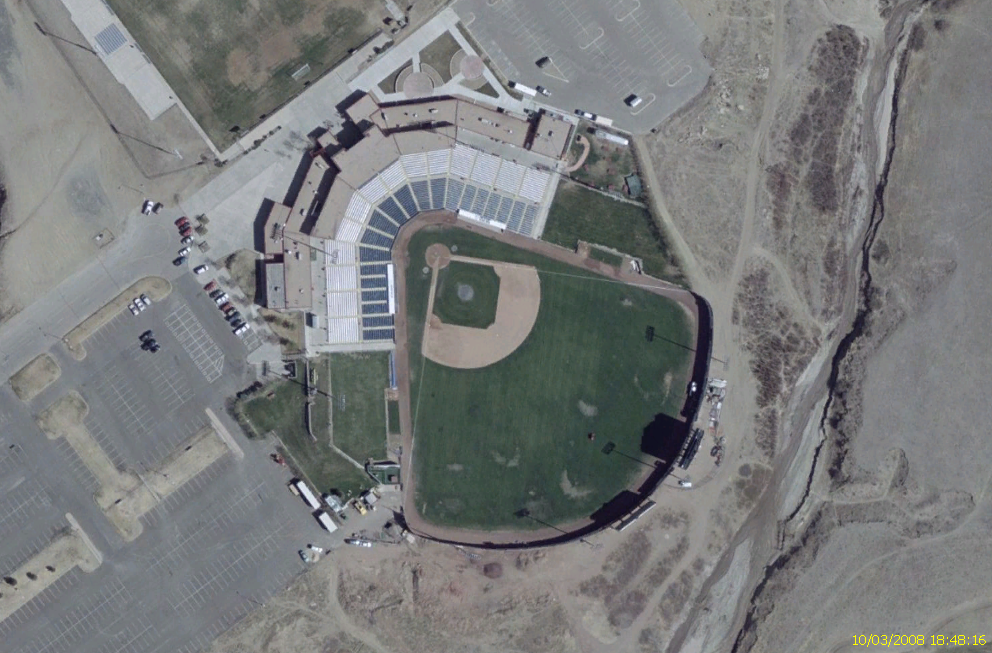

- Location within Colorado Location within the United States
- Interactive map of blocktickets PARK
- Former names: Sky Sox Stadium (1988–2005); Security Service Field (2005–2019); UCHealth Park (2019–2025)
- Address: 4385 Tutt Boulevard; Colorado Springs, Colorado, U.S.
- Coordinates: 38°53′39.02″N 104°42′37.12″W
- Elevation: 6,531 ft (1,991 m)
- Owner: Elmore Sports Group
- Operator: Elmore Sports Group
- Capacity: 8,500
- Surface: Natural grass
- Record attendance: 9,505 (July 4, 2004)
- Field size: Left field: 350 feet (107 m); Left-center field: 385 feet (117 m); Center field: 410 feet (125 m); Right-center field: 385 feet (117 m); Right field: 350 feet (107 m)

Construction
- Groundbreaking: January 10, 1988
- Opened: June 18, 1988; 38 years ago
- Cost: US$3.4 million ($10.1 million in 2025 dollars)
- Architect: HNTB
- General contractor: Bassett Construction Company

Tenants
- Colorado Springs Sky Sox (PCL) 1988–2018; Rocky Mountain Vibes (PL) 2019–2025; Colorado Springs Sky Sox (PL) 2025

Blocktickets Park, styled as blocktickets PARK, is a baseball park in the western United States, on the eastern edge of Colorado Springs, Colorado. From 2019 to 2025, the stadium hosted the Rocky Mountain Vibes, an independent minor league team in the Pioneer League, and from 1988 to 2018, it was the home of the Colorado Springs Sky Sox, a Triple-A team of the Pacific Coast League (PCL).

== History ==
Before the completion of Sky Sox Stadium, the Sky Sox played at Spurgeon Stadium, a public field at Memorial Park in downtown Colorado Springs which had hosted the original Sky Sox. Sky Sox Stadium opened in June 1988 at a cost of $3.4 million, and remained the home of the Sky Sox until their 2018 departure.

The ballpark is 6,531 feet (1,991 m) above sea level, making it the highest professional baseball park in North America. The natural grass field is aligned southeast (home plate to second base), toward the plains and the Springs Ranch housing development, meaning that fans cannot see the Rocky Mountains to the west. The recommended ballpark alignment is northeast by east.

Covering most of the first base line is a picnic terrace. It holds nearly 1,000 people and is the site of many weddings and other special occasions. At the end of the right field foul line, there is an eight-person hot tub that is recognized as "The Highest Hot Tub in Professional Sports", with guests served champagne and acknowledged on the main display.

The Sky Sox won Pacific Coast League championships in 1992 and 1995, and attendance was generally good. The current attendance record was set on July 4, 2004, when the Sky Sox lost to the Omaha Royals, 6–5, in front of 9,505 fans. However, at the end of the 2004 season, facing declining turnout and an assortment of problems that showed the ballpark's age (capped by the center-field scoreboard, on which the ball, strike, and out indicators were non-functional), team executives decided to renovate the ballpark.

Changes included an improved sound system, a more modern scoreboard with video screen, a new walkway leading to the gates, a banquet facility at the end of the right field concourse, and a readout in the right field wall displaying the speed of each pitch. Along with these changes, the park's naming rights were sold to Security Service Federal Credit Union. The naming rights deal expired after the 2018 season.

On May 8, 2019, it was announced that UCHealth, as part of a sponsorship deal with the Vibes, had purchased the naming rights to the field, naming it UCHealth Park.

At a press conference in May 2025, the Vibes announced a naming rights deal with Blocktickets, an online ticketing and box office solution platform. In June 2025, the Northern Colorado Owlz of the Pioneer League folded and were replaced with a team branded as the latest incarnation of the Colorado Springs Sky Sox and sharing Blocktickets Park (styled as blocktickets PARK) with the Rocky Mountain Vibes.

== Notable personnel ==
The names of various notable personnel in Sky Sox history ring the upper deck. Known as the members of the Sky Sox Hall of Fame, they are Luis Medina (played 1988–1991), Sam Hairston (played 1950–1956), Charlie Manuel (managed 1990–1992), Alan Cockrell (played 1990, 1992, 1994–1996), Norm "Bulldog" Coleman (non-player who helped the Sky Sox succeed financially, inducted 1996), Ryan Hawblitzel (played 1993–1996), Trenidad Hubbard (played 1993–1996), and Brad Mills (managed 1993–1996). All historical players have their jerseys retired and statistics shown in the Hall of Fame Bar & Grill located within the ballpark.
