= Hsu Jo-hsi =

Taiwanese baseball player (born 2000)

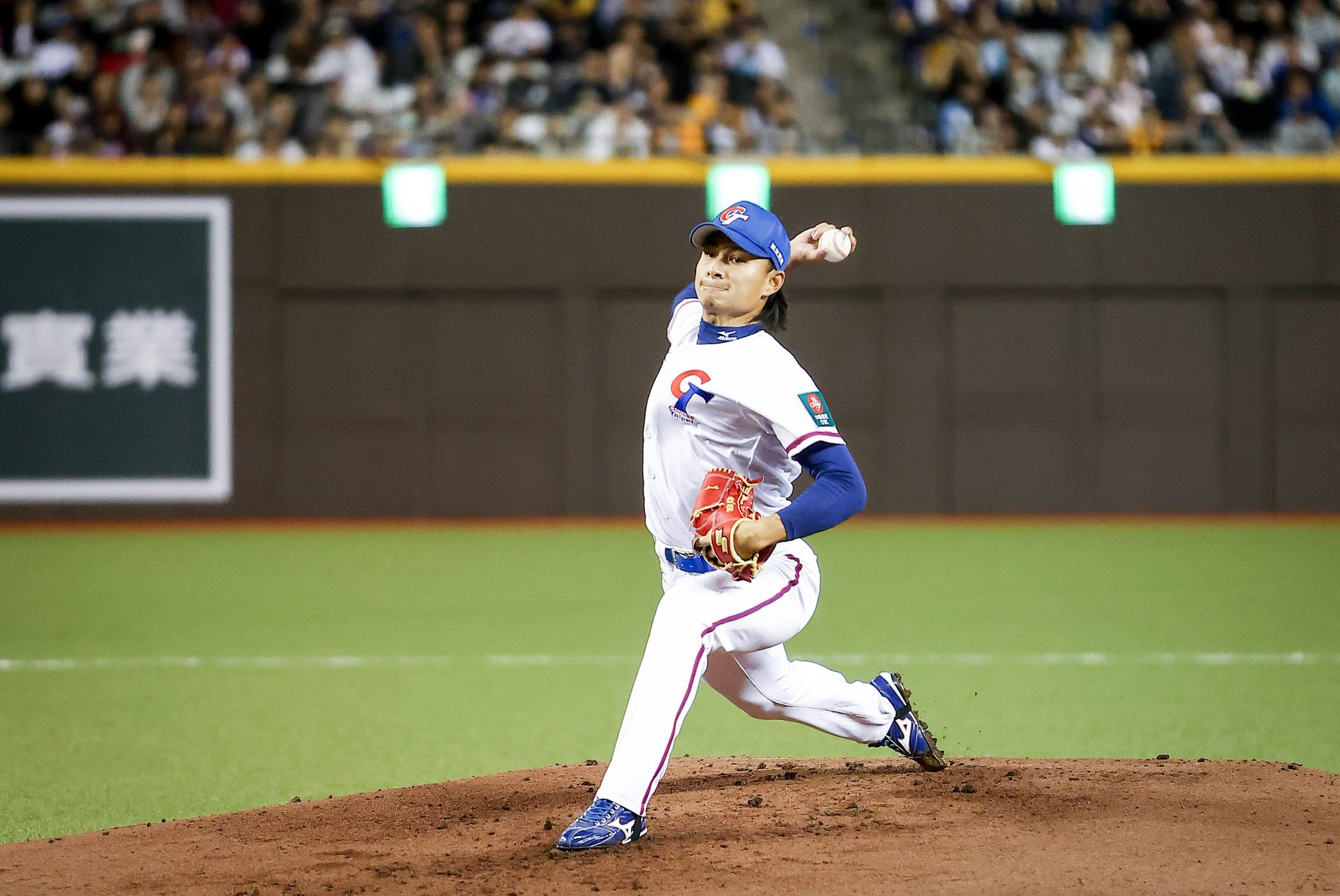
- Hsu pitching against South Korea in the 2023 Asian Baseball Championship

Fukuoka SoftBank Hawks – No. 18
- Pitcher
- Born: November 1, 2000 (age 25); Taoyuan, Taiwan
- Bats: Right Throws: Right

Professional debut
- CPBL: March 17, 2021, for the Wei Chuan Dragons
- NPB: April 1, 2026, for the Fukuoka SoftBank Hawks

CPBL statistics (through 2025 season)
- Win–loss record: 16−18
- Earned run average: 2.42
- Strikeouts: 349

NPB statistics (through September 27, 2026)
- Win−loss record: 2−3
- Earned run average: 4.99
- Strikeouts: 28
- Stats at Baseball Reference

Teams
- Wei Chuan Dragons (2021–2025); Fukuoka SoftBank Hawks (2026–)

Career highlights and awards
- Taiwan Series champion (2023); Taiwan Series MVP (2023); 2× All-Star (2024–2025)

Hsu Jo-hsi (Chinese: 徐若熙; born 1 November 2000) is a Taiwanese professional baseball pitcher for the Fukuoka SoftBank Hawks of Nippon Professional Baseball (NPB). He previously played in the Chinese Professional Baseball League (CPBL) for the Wei Chuan Dragons.

== Career ==
=== Wei Chuan Dragons ===
On July 1, 2019, Hsu was selected by the Wei Chuan Dragons as the 6th overall pick in the 2019 CPBL draft.

On February 28, 2020, Hsu pitched in a warm-up game against the CTBC Brothers, where he gave up 5 runs across 2 innings. After feeling discomfort in his right hand, Hsu was examined and underwent bone spur surgery, which ruled him out for 6 months.

On March 17, 2021, Hsu started his first professional game against the Brothers, where he pitched 3 2/3 scoreless innings, striking out 11 batters and allowing 3 hits. Hsu became the first pitcher in CPBL history to strikeout 11 of his first batters faced. On March 28, Hsu recorded 10 strikeouts across 4 2/3 innings in a 5−2 defeat against the Fubon Guardians. On August 8, Hsu ended an 8-game winless streak in a 5−1 win against the Guardians, striking out 12 across 5 innings, including 8 consecutive batters.

Hsu missed the start of the 2022 season due to a torn ligament in his elbow. While the original examination concluded that Hsu did not require surgery, due to slow recovery, he decided to undergo Tommy John surgery in July, ruling him out for the season.

On August 27, 2023, Hsu made his first appearance since 2021, pitching 1 2/3 scoreless innings against the Guardians. On November 4, Hsu started Game 1 of the 2023 Taiwan Series against the Rakuten Monkeys, pitching 4 innings, allowing 4 hits and a run while striking out 4. On the 11th, in Game 6, Hsu struck out 7 hitters across 7 scoreless innings in the Dragons' 2−0 win, forcing Game 7. Hsu was awarded the 2023 Taiwan Series MVP for his performances.

=== Fukuoka SoftBank Hawks ===
On December 22, 2025, Hsu signed with the Fukuoka SoftBank Hawks of Nippon Professional Baseball.

On April 1, 2026, Hsu made his NPB debut against the Tohoku Rakuten Golden Eagles, pitching 6 scoreless innings, allowing 3 hits and 2 walks while striking out 6, earning his first NPB win. On April 8, Hsu was handed his first loss against the Saitama Seibu Lions. He allowed just 1 run across 7 innings as the Hawks lost 1−2. On April 17, Hsu struggled against the Orix Buffaloes, allowing 6 hits and 7 runs across 1.2 innings, and was subsequently demoted to the 2nd team on the following day.

== International career ==
Hsu was selected to play for Chinese Taipei at the 2023 Asian Baseball Championship, where he struck out 10 hitters across 7 innings against South Korea in the opening game on December 4.

Hsu was selected to play at the 2026 World Baseball Classic, where he pitched 4 scoreless innings, allowing 2 hits against Australia in the tournament opener. Taiwan went on to lose 0−3.
