= Pakistan Federation Baseball =

- Sport: Baseball
- Abbreviation: PFB
- Founded: 1992
- Affiliation: International Baseball Federation
- Regional affiliation: Baseball Federation of Asia
- Headquarters: Lahore
- Location: Punjab Stadium
- President: Syed Fakhar Ali Shah
- Chairman: Shaukat Javed
- Vice president: Dr. Nauman Ul Haq
- (Pakistan)

Pakistan Federation Baseball (PFB) is the governing body for baseball in Pakistan. The Federation was founded in 1992 by Syed Khawar Shah, to promote the games of baseball in the country. The PFB has hosted the Asian Baseball Cup on several occasions.

In 2015, Pakistan national baseball team took part in the Asian Baseball Championship in Taiwan as the West Asian Champion. In 2016, it debuted in the World Baseball Classic qualification in New York, following its 5th-place finish at the 2015 Asian Baseball Championship.

In 2016, Pakistan women's national baseball team made their debut at the World Championship in South Korea. As of 2017, it is ranked sixth in Asia out of 15.

In 2017, PFB launched a development programme in FATA. 20 young baseball players were selected for training at Pakistan Youth Baseball Academy.

WAPDA's baseball team is the current reigning national champion after their 4-2 win over Pakistan Army's team in the final to win the title of 22nd National Baseball Championship.

PFB is affiliated with:

- International Baseball Federation
- Baseball Federation of Asia
- Pakistan Sports Board
- Pakistan Olympic Association

== See also ==
- Pakistan national baseball team
- Pakistan women's national baseball team
