= Pakistan Sports Complex =

Sport complex in Islamabad, Pakistan

- مجتمع ورزشی پاکستان
- Interactive map of Pakistan Sports Complex
- Address: Islamabad, Pakistan
- Owner: Government of Pakistan
- Operator: Pakistan Sports Board
- Acreage: 59 hectares

Construction
- Built: 1970s–1980s
- Opened: 1984

The Pakistan Sports Complex is a national multi-sport complex in Islamabad, Pakistan. Operated by the Pakistan Sports Board, the complex occupies approximately 59 hectares (145 acres) and contains outdoor stadiums, indoor halls, training facilities and athlete accommodation. Its principal venues include Jinnah Sports Stadium, Liaquat Gymnasium, Naseer Bunda Hockey Stadium and several smaller indoor halls.

The complex was designed and built with Chinese assistance. It was originally connected with Islamabad's proposed hosting of the 1978 Asian Games, which were ultimately held in Bangkok. The complex was completed in 1984, while its swimming pool was completed in 1988. It subsequently served as the main venue cluster when Islamabad hosted the 1989 South Asian Games and 2004 South Asian Games.

== History ==
Chinese architects completed the design of the complex in 1976. Construction was postponed after Pakistan did not host the 1978 Asian Games, and the principal complex was eventually completed in 1984.

It has staged several editions of the National Games. Pakistan first hosted the South Asian Games at the complex in 1989. The complex was renovated in preparation for the 2004 edition, which was again centred on Islamabad.

== Facilities ==
Facilities of the Pakistan Sports Complex include:

- Jinnah Sports Stadium, a multi-purpose outdoor stadium
- Liaquat Gymnasium, indoor arena
- Naseer Bunda Hockey Stadium
- Rodham Hall
- Hamidi Hall
- Amir Khan Boxing Hall
- Roshan Khan Squash Complex
- Swimming pool

== See also ==
- Sport in Pakistan
- List of stadiums in Pakistan
