= Bangladesh national baseball team =

Information
- Country: Bangladesh
- Federation: Bangladesh Baseball-Softball Association
- Confederation: WBSC Asia
- Manager: Hiroki Watanabe

WBSC ranking
- Current: 76 (26 March 2026)
- Highest: 60 (August 2023)
- Lowest: 79 (December 2019)

The Bangladesh national baseball team is the national baseball team of Bangladesh. The team represents the Bangladesh Baseball-Softball Association in international competitions. The team has competed regionally in Asia in various competitions such as the Baseball United Arab Classic, West Asia Baseball Cup, and the SAARC Baseball Championship.

== History ==
The federation was founded in November of 2006.

== Results ==
West Asia Cup

- 2019: 5th
- 2023: 4th
- 2025: 6th

Baseball United Arab Classic

- 2024: 4th
