= SAARC Baseball Championship =

International sporting competition

- Most recent season or competition: 2011 SAARC Baseball Championship
- Sport: Baseball
- Founded: 2011
- No. of teams: 8
- Continent: South Asia
- Most recent champion: Pakistan

The SAARC Baseball Championship is the main championship tournament between national baseball teams in South Asia. It is governed by the Baseball Federation of Asia (BFA). The first championship tournament began on 12 April 2011 and was hosted in Lahore, Pakistan. Four international teams from South Asia participated, including Nepal, Sri Lanka and Afghanistan.

== Tournament results ==
Year	Final Host	Champions	Runners-up
2011; Details	(Pakistan); Lahore	Pakistan	Sri Lanka
2013; Details	(Sri Lanka); Homagama		

=== Current members (alphabetically) ===
- Afghanistan
- Bangladesh
- Bhutan
- India
- Iran
- Maldives
- Nepal
- Pakistan
- Sri Lanka

== See also ==
- Baseball awards#Asia
- South Asian Games
