= Softball in India =

- Country: India
- Governing body: Softball Association of India
- National team(s): Men; Women
- First played: 1944

National competitions
- National Softball Championship

International competitions
- Men's Softball World Championship; Asian Men's Softball Championship; Women's Softball World Championship; Asian Women's Softball Championship

Softball is a sport that is played in many schools and universities in India, however, the sport has not caught on at the professional level. Softball in India is governed by the Softball Association of India. Softball was introduced to India in 1944 when some local boys began playing the sport with American troops stationed at Jodhpur during the Second World War. There are one million children playing the game currently.

The women's Softball team of India will make its debut in the 19th Asian Games and it is approved by the Indian Olympic Association of India
