= Pakistan national baseball team =

Information
- Country: Pakistan
- Federation: Pakistan Federation Baseball
- Confederation: Baseball Federation of Asia
- Manager: Syed Fakhar Ali Shah

WBSC ranking
- Current: 43 (26 March 2026)
- Highest: 21 (25 September 2018)
- Lowest: 49 (2 November 2023)

Uniforms

Asian Games
- Appearances: 2 (first in 2010)
- Best result: 5th (2 times, most recent in 2014)

Asian Championship
- Appearances: 6 (first in 2003)
- Best result: 5th (1 time, in 2015)

The Pakistan national baseball team (Urdu: پاکستان بیس بال ٹیم, Sindhi:پاڪستان جي بيس بال ٽيم , Pashto/Pakhto:د پاکستان د بیسبال لوبډله) is the national team representing Pakistan in international baseball tournaments and competitions. The team is controlled and governed by the Pakistan Federation Baseball, which is represented in the Baseball Federation of Asia (BFA), having been ranked #5 in Asia, just behind China. They are ranked as the top and one of the most successful baseball teams in South Asia, winning the first SAARC Baseball Championship 8–2 against Sri Lanka in 2011. As of 2023, Pakistan is currently ranked 38th in the world by the World Baseball Softball Confederation.

The Pakistani team has participated in many of the international and regional tournaments and has achieved many successes. It has won the Asian Baseball Championship (C level) title in 2010, where they won 10–0 against Hong Kong in the final round, and five titles at the Asian Baseball Cup, winning the last tournament in 2015. The team qualified for the World Baseball Classic qualifier round for the first time where they lost 0–10 against Brazil and 0–14 while competing against Great Britain in 2016.

Like in almost every South Asian country where baseball is a minor sport, Pakistan's most popular sport is cricket, which diverts athletic talent away from baseball. As of 2023, Pakistan has never qualified for the World Baseball Classic.

== Results and fixtures ==
The following is a list of professional baseball match results currently active in the latest version of the WBSC World Rankings, as well as any future matches that have been scheduled.

Legend

Win Lose Void or postponed Fixture

=== 2018 ===
Asian Games GS	August 26	Japan	15–0 (F/6)	Pakistan	Jakarta, Indonesia
Asian Games GS	9:00 WIB		Boxscore		Attendance: 200

Asian Games GS	August 27	Thailand	1–8	Pakistan	Jakarta, Indonesia
Asian Games GS	9:00 WIB		Boxscore		Attendance: 70

Asian Games GS	August 28	Pakistan	3–16 (F/7)	China	Jakarta, Indonesia
Asian Games GS	14:00 WIB		Boxscore		Attendance: 100

Asian Games CR	August 30	Pakistan	10–2	Indonesia	Jakarta, Indonesia
Asian Games CR	9:00 WIB		Boxscore		Attendance: 80

Asian Games CR	August 31	Pakistan	12–2 (F/7)	Hong Kong	Jakarta, Indonesia
Asian Games CR	8:00 WIB		Boxscore		Attendance: 75

=== 2019 ===
West Asia Cup GS	July 15	Pakistan	11–1	Iran	Colombo, Sri Lanka

West Asia Cup GS	July 16	Pakistan	17–0 (F/5)	Bangladesh	Colombo, Sri Lanka

West Asia Cup SF	July 18	Pakistan	13–2	India	Colombo, Sri Lanka

West Asia Cup F	July 19	Sri Lanka	5–4	Pakistan	Colombo, Sri Lanka
West Asia Cup F			Boxscore

Asian Championship GS	October 14	Philippines	11–0 (F/7)	Pakistan	Taichung Field, Taiwan
Asian Championship GS	13:00 NST		Boxscore		Attendance: 0

Asian Championship GS	October 14	Pakistan	1–12 (F/7)	South Korea	Douliu Stadium, Taiwan
Asian Championship GS	12:00 NST		Boxscore		Attendance: 350

Asian Championship GS	October 16	Pakistan	1–11 (F/7)	China	Taichung Field, Taiwan
Asian Championship GS	12:00 NST		Boxscore		Attendance: 250

Asian Championship CR	October 18	Sri Lanka	10–1	Pakistan	Taichung Field, Taiwan
Asian Championship CR	12:00 NST		Boxscore		Attendance: 130

Asian Championship CR	October 19	Pakistan	7–17 (F/7)	Hong Kong	Taichung Field, Taiwan
Asian Championship CR	12:00 NST		Boxscore		Attendance: 167

=== 2022 ===
World Baseball Classic Q	September 30	Pakistan	4–7	Argentina	Rod Carew Stadium, Panama
World Baseball Classic Q	19:00 ET	LP: Omar Arif	Boxscore	WP: Lucas Ramon; Sv: Franco Perez (1)	Attendance: 466; Umpires: HP: Lisa Turbitt. 1B: Frantisek Pribyl. 2B: Dane Poncsak. 3B: Michael Ulloa

World Baseball Classic Q	October 2	Pakistan	0–12 (F/7)	Nicaragua	Rod Carew Stadium, Panama
World Baseball Classic Q	12:00 ET	LP: Muhammad Zohaib	Boxscore	WP: Osman Gutierrez; HR: Isaac Benard (1)	Umpires: HP: Juan Manuel Rodriguez. 1B: Anthony Perez. 2B: Austin Jones. 3B: Mark Stewart

=== 2024 ===
Baseball United Arab Classic GS	November 7	Bangladesh	0–10 (F/4)	Pakistan	The Sevens, Dubai
Baseball United Arab Classic GS	10:30 GST			WP: Jibran Murtaza; HR: Muhammad Hussain

Baseball United Arab Classic GS	November 7	United Arab Emirates	3–10 (F/4)	Pakistan	The Sevens, Dubai
Baseball United Arab Classic GS	20:30 GST

Baseball United Arab Classic GS	November 8	Pakistan	12–0 (F/5)	India	The Sevens, Dubai
Baseball United Arab Classic GS	20:00 GST

Baseball United Arab Classic GS	November 9	Pakistan	17–3 (F/4)	Afghanistan	The Sevens, Dubai
Baseball United Arab Classic GS	14:00 GST

Baseball United Arab Classic SF	November 10	Sri Lanka	0–3 (F/7)	Pakistan	The Sevens, Dubai
Baseball United Arab Classic SF	14:00 GST			WP: Muhammad Aslam

Baseball United Arab Classic F	November 10	United Arab Emirates	1–12	Pakistan	The Sevens, Dubai
Baseball United Arab Classic F	20:00 GST			WP: Moosa Nonomiya

== Regional competition ==
=== Asian Baseball Championship ===
Pakistan have participated at the Asian Baseball Championship since 2003, and have competed in the competition ever since. The national team has struggled in competing against top Asian teams such as Japan, Chinese Taipei, and South Korea, among others. Pakistan secured fifth position after coming victorious against Indonesia in the 2015 Asian Baseball Championship.

=== Asian Games ===
In all four Asian Games to include baseball, Pakistan have competed in the 2010 and 2014 tournaments, though they have not won the tournament once Pakistan secured their largest win 25–0 against Mongolia in Seoul.

=== West Asia Baseball Cup ===
Pakistan have dominated the Asian Baseball Cup since its inception, and have competed in every year. Since 1997, Pakistan have never missed out on placing in the top 3 in any tournament, and is the only team to have achieved this feat. Pakistan also holds the record for most consecutive Asian Baseball Cup titles, having won five times in total, while the national team have been defending their title since the last four tournaments.

== International tournament results ==
=== World Baseball Classic ===
World Baseball Classic record							Qualification record			
Year	Round	Position	W	L	RS	RA	W	L	RS	RA
2006	did not enter						No qualifiers held			
2009	did not enter						No qualifiers held			
2013	did not enter						did not enter			
2017	did not qualify						0	2	0	24
2023	did not qualify						0	2	4	19
2026	did not enter						did not enter			
Total	-	0/6	-	-	-	-	0	4	4	43

Pakistan World Baseball Classic Qualifiers record
Opponent	Tournaments met	W-L record	Largest victory		Largest defeat		Current streak
Opponent	Tournaments met	W-L record	Score	Tournament	Score	Tournament	Current streak
Argentina	1	0-1	–		7–4	Panama 2023	L1
Brazil	1	0-1	–		10–0 (F/7)	United States 2017	L1
Great Britain	1	0-1	–		14–0 (F/7)	United States 2017	L1
Nicaragua	1	0-1	–		12–0 (F/7)	Panama 2023	L1
Overall	2	0–4	–		Against GBR		L4
Overall	2	0–4	–		14–0 (F/7)	United States 2017	L4

=== Arab Classic ===
Arab Classic record
Year	Round	Position	W	L	%	RS	RA
(United Arab Emirates) 2024	Gold Medal Game	(gold) 1st	6	0	1.000	64	7

== Current squad ==
Pakistan roster – 2023 World Baseball Classic Qualifier
Players		Coaches
Pitchers: 38 Atif Ahmad; 11 Amir Asghar; 16 Muhammad Aslam; 19 Osman Buttar; 10 Adam Khan; 21 Amaan Khan; 6 Majeed Khan; 33 Tariq Nadeem; 33 Rohan Shah; 7 Syed Ali Shah; 23 Muhammad Usman; 17 Muhammad Zohaib	Catchers: 20 Iyad Ansari; 24 Umair Imdad Bhatti; 55 Muhammad Shah; Infielders: 5 Muhammad Asad; 18 Faqeer Hussain; 9 Alex Khan; 26 Tariq Khan; 3 Zan Von Schlegell; Outfielders: 34 Muhammad Hussain; 4 Sami Khan; 22 Shahid Sattar; 12 Shan Sundu	Manager: 14 Syed Fakhar Ali Shah; Coaches: 25 Miah Rafique Choudhury (Hitting); 27 Peter Durkovic (Pitching); 32 Jobie Anderson (Third Base); 35 Randall Arms (Bullpen); 37 Manzar Shah (Assistant)

== Honors and recognition ==
- Asian Baseball Championship
  - 1st place, 2010 (C level)
  - 2nd place, 2009 (C level)
- Asian Games
  - 5th place, 2010, 2014, 2018
- Asian Baseball Cup
  - 1st place, 2006, 2010, 2012, 2013, 2015, 2023
  - 2nd place, 2001, 2002, 2004, 2009, 2017, 2019, 2025
  - 3rd place, 1997
- SAARC Baseball Championship
  - 1st place, 2011

=== Records ===
- Largest win — 25 - 0 Mongolia, (Seoul, 24 September 2014)
- Worst defeat — 0 - 17 (F/5) South Korea, (Guangzhou, 16 November 2010)

== See also ==
- Asian Baseball Championship
- Baseball at the Asian Games
- Asian Baseball Cup
- SAARC Baseball Championship
- World Baseball Classic
