= Northern Colorado Owlz =

- Founded in 2021; Windsor, Colorado
Team logo
Cap insignia

Minor league affiliations
- Previous classes: Independent
- Previous leagues: Pioneer League (2022–2025)

Team data
- Previous names: Orem Owlz (2005–2020); Provo Angels (2001–2004)
- Colors: Navy blue, gold, silver, white
- Ballpark: City Park Field, Fort Collins, CO (4 games, 2025)
- Previous parks: 4Rivers Equipment Stadium (2023–2024); Jackson Field (2022); UCCU Ballpark (2005–2020); Larry H. Miller Field (2001–2004)
- Manager: Dmitri Young

The Northern Colorado Owlz were an independent baseball team of the Pioneer League (which is not affiliated with Major League Baseball (MLB) but is an MLB Partner League). They were based in Windsor, Colorado, and played their home games at 4Rivers Equipment Stadium at Future Legends Complex.

In conjunction with a contraction of Minor League Baseball in 2021, the Pioneer League was converted from an MLB-affiliated Rookie Advanced league to an independent baseball league and granted status as an MLB Partner League. The league's Orem Owlz of Orem, Utah, relocated to Windsor concurrent with this change to the league.

With the addition of the Boise Hawks from the former Northwest League, the Pioneer League was left with nine teams for the 2021 season, though this problem was solved when the Owlz elected to sit out the 2021 season to allow for construction of their new ballpark to be completed. The Owlz initially played at Jackson Field at the University of Northern Colorado. TicketSmarter Stadium at Future Legends Complex was expected to open in 2022, but has been delayed several times. The continued delays resulted in temporary certificates of operation to expire and the city of Windsor shut down the facilities in April 2025.

Unable to provide adequate playing conditions for its players, the Owlz resigned from the Pioneer League allowing for the creation of a new team, the Colorado Springs Sky Sox, that will retain its coaches and players and play their remaining home games at blocktickets PARK in Colorado Springs, sharing it with the Rocky Mountain Vibes, to complete the 2025 season.

== Roster ==
Northern Colorado Owlz roster
Active (25-man) roster	Coaching staff
Pitchers: 32 Will Buraconak; 28 Jose Diaz; 23 Nathan Draves; 24 Chase Jessee; 22 Brandon Kaminer; 8 Dutch Landis; 16 Carter Linton; 26 Kris Massey; 31 Chris Mutter; 33 Dalton Ross; 21 Austin Schneider; 15 Mark Tindall; 19 Cory Wills; Catchers: 13 Josh Glenn; 10 Jordan Rathbone; Infielders: 9 Tim Bouchard; 36 Jackson Coutts; 3 Kevin Jimenez; 34 Nick Michaels; 18 Danny Perez; 1 Payton Robertson; Outfielders: 2 Estevan De La O; 4 Euro Diaz; 5 Henry George; 12 Abdel Guadalupe; 20 Dave Matthews	Manager: -- Frank Gonzales; Coaches: Disabled list; ‡ Inactive list; § Suspended list; updated July 27, 2023 Transactions
