= Iraq national baseball team =

National baseball team of Iraq

Information
- Country: Iraq
- Federation: Iraqi Baseball and Softball Federation
- Confederation: Baseball Federation of Asia

WBSC ranking
- Current: NR (26 March 2026)
- Highest: 66 (31 December 2016)

The Iraq national baseball team is the national baseball team that represents Iraq in international competitions.

The team is controlled by the Iraqi Baseball and Softball Federation, founded in 2004, and is a member of WBSC Asia since 2009. A domestic baseball league, based in Baghdad, formed in November 2003.

Iraq lost all three of its games in the 2015 Asian Baseball Cup and both games in the 2017 Asian Baseball Cup in blowouts.
