= Rocky Mountain Vibes =

American minor-league professional baseball team

- Founded in 2019; Colorado Springs, Colorado

Team logo	Cap insignia

Minor league affiliations
- Previous classes: Independent (2021–2025); Rookie Advanced (2019–2020)
- Previous leagues: Pioneer League (2019–2025)

Major league affiliations
- Team: Independent (from 2021)
- Previous teams: Milwaukee Brewers (2019–2020)

Minor league titles
- League titles (0): None

Team data
- Name: Rocky Mountain Vibes (2019–2025)
- Colors: Rubine red, navy, gold, sky blue, tan
- Ballpark: Blocktickets Park (2019–2025)
- Owner/ Operator: Elmore Sports Group
- General manager: Bob Flannery
- Manager: Les Lancaster
- Website: vibesbaseball.com

The Rocky Mountain Vibes were an independent baseball team of the Pioneer League, an MLB Partner League. They were located in Colorado Springs, Colorado, and played their home games at Blocktickets Park.

As a result of a contraction of Minor League Baseball in 2021, the Pioneer League, of which the Vibes have been members since 2019, was converted from an MLB-affiliated Rookie Advanced league to an independent baseball league and granted status as an MLB Partner League. Prior to this, they had been affiliated with the Milwaukee Brewers in 2019 and 2020.

== History ==
On June 21, 2017, David G. Elmore, president of Elmore Sports Group, announced a relocation plan involving several of its teams. The Helena Brewers Rookie Pioneer League franchise would move to Colorado Springs in 2019. The team would continue to compete in the league under a new nickname. The Triple-A Colorado Springs Sky Sox of the Pacific Coast League would relocate to San Antonio and continue in the PCL as the San Antonio Missions. The San Antonio Double-A Texas League franchise would relocate to Amarillo, Texas, as the Amarillo Sod Poodles.

A contest to determine the Pioneer League franchise's new name was announced in June 2018. The five finalists in the name-the-team contest were "Colorado Springs Happy Campers", "Colorado Springs Lamb Chops", "Colorado Springs Punchy Pikas", "Colorado Springs Throttle Jockeys", and "Rocky Mountain Oysters". The team's name, "Rocky Mountain Vibes", was announced on November 19, 2018. Though not one of the finalists, the name is related to the proposed Happy Campers moniker in reference to the happy feelings or "good vibes" one may feel when enjoying outdoor activities.

Rocky Mountain began as affiliates of the Milwaukee Brewers. The Vibes played their first game on June 14 against the Orem Owlz as visitors, losing 3–0. Their first home game was played at UCHealth Park on June 21 against the Grand Junction Rockies, an 8–5 loss.

In conjunction with a contraction of Minor League Baseball in 2021, the Pioneer League was converted from an MLB-affiliated league to an independent baseball league and granted status as an MLB Partner League, with Rocky Mountain continuing as members. During the 2021 season, the Vibes served as an unofficial farm team for the Acereros de Monclova of the Mexican League, after the two sides signed an agreement allowing Rocky Mountain to host and develop a number of young talents in Monclova's organization. The partnership with Monclova was later renewed for the 2022 season.

In October 2025, the team announced they would fold prior to the 2026 season.

== Roster ==
Rocky Mountain Vibes roster
Active (25-man) roster	Coaching staff
Pitchers: 4 Christian Day; 30 Garrett Hill; 24 Carlos Lomeli; 21 Myles Martinez; 35 Trey Morrill; 32 Daniel Nunan; 16 Jaxon O'Neal; 19 Zach Ottinger; 18 Max Pettey; 12 Kyle Pijaszek; 20 Nick Powers; 31 Bryson Spagnuolo; 10 Dustin Sprong; 26 Andrew Vail; 14 Kelsey Ward; Utility players: 29 Luke Powell; Catchers: 25 Tyler Davis; 9 Billy Hancock; Infielders: 5 Josh Day; 3 Devyn Lopez; 2 Eddie McCabe; 13 Slater Schield; 28 Dane Tofteland; 15 Ernie Yake; Outfielders: 6 Brett Carson; 8 Steven Rivas; 22 Mason Sykes; 11 Stephen Wilmer	Manager: -- Les Lancaster; Coaches: -- Chad De La Guerra (co-hitting/defense); -- Mike Hartley (pitching); -- Rafael Melchione (co-hitting/catching); Disabled list; ‡ Inactive list; § Suspended list; updated June 29, 2024 Transactions
