= Nepal national baseball team =

Nepalese sports team

Information
- Country: Nepal
- Federation: Nepal Baseball & Softball Association
- Confederation: Baseball Federation of Asia
- Manager: Bipin Bajracharya

WBSC ranking
- Current: NR (31 December 2025)

The Nepal national baseball team is a national team of Nepal and in the sport of Baseball. They made their debut in the 2017 West Asian Baseball Cup.

== History ==
Baseball was introduced to Nepal in the 1980s by a group of youth who had been exposed to the sport in the United States. The development of organized baseball in Nepal began in 1999, with the debut of NPO Japan Club Laligurans.

After the establishment of the Nepal Baseball & Softball Association (NBSA)https://nbsa.org.np/}it started to work for the development and promotion of the game. Nepal national baseball team earn maiden international victory against Iraq in the 13th BFA Asia Baseball Championship in 2017.

== Current roster ==
Nepal roster – 2024 Arab Baseball Classic roster
Players		Coaches
Pitchers: Pujan Khichaju; Ishwar K.C; Nischal K.C	Catchers: Sagun Khichaju; Bijay Ghale; Infielders: Sukrim Thapa; Chhiring Tamang; Sanil Lama; Pradeep Poudel; Rajeet Pun Mager; Outfielders: Abhaya Bayalkoti; Nikesh K.C; Rohan Khatri; Narayan Khadka	Manager: –; Coaches: –; –; –; –; –; –; –
