= India national baseball team =

Information
- Country: India
- Federation: Amateur Baseball Federation of India
- Confederation: WBSC Asia

WBSC ranking
- Current: 69 (26 October 2026)
- Highest: 55 (March 2023)
- Lowest: 75 (December 2012)

Asian Championship
- Appearances: 2 (first in 1987)
- Best result: 7th

Captain of Men's team

The India men's national baseball team is the team that represents India in international-level baseball competitions.

India has produced two players that have achieved Major League status in the United States: Rinku Singh and Dinesh Patel.

== Pesapallo ==
Pesapallo, a Finnish derivative of baseball, was also introduced to India in 2007. Though it is an infrequent sport, people have come forward and recently a World Cup league was also played in India in year 2019. India secured bronze medal by defeating Australia in their medal winning match.

== Results ==
=== Asian Baseball Championship ===
- (Japan) 1987 – 7th
- (South Korea) 1989 – 7th

=== Asian Baseball Cup ===
- (Philippines) 1995 – Bronze
- (Thailand) 1997 – 4th
- (India) 1999 – Silver
- (Pakistan) 2015 (West) – Bronze
- (Sri Lanka) 2019 (West) – Bronze
- (Iran) 2025 (West) – 4th

=== Baseball United Arab Classic ===
- (United Arab Emirates) 2024 – 5th

=== Other tournaments ===
- 2015 Presidential Cup Iran – Gold

== See also ==
- India women's national baseball team
- Baseball in India
