= Sri Lanka national baseball team =

Information
- Country: Sri Lanka
- Federation: Sri Lanka Baseball/Softball Association
- Confederation: WBSC Asia

WBSC ranking
- Current: 53 (26 October 2026)

The Sri Lanka national baseball team is the national baseball team of Sri Lanka. Baseball was introduced to Sri Lanka in the mid-1980s. American baseball coach Jim Dimick was the first official coach to teach the game to the players. The team represents Sri Lanka in international competitions. Sri Lanka took part in the first ever Asian Baseball Cup, which was held in Philippines in 1995. Twenty four countries belong to the Baseball Federation of Asia. In May 2009, Sri Lanka qualified for the Semi-finals of the Asian Baseball Championship for the first time. In July 2019, Sri Lanka became the champions of the West Asia Baseball Cup by defeating Iran and Pakistan in the semifinals and finals respectively.
