= 1993 Asian Baseball Championship =

Tournament details
- Country: Australia
- Dates: 26 February – 7 March
- Teams: 7
- Defending champions: Japan

Final positions
- Champions: Japan (11th title)
- Runners-up: South Korea
- Third place: Chinese Taipei
- Fourth place: Australia

The 1993 Asian Baseball Championship was the seventeenth continental tournament held by the Baseball Federation of Asia. The tournament was held in Perth, Australia for the second and likely last time; Australia has not participated in the tournament since joining the Baseball Confederation of Oceania. The tournament was won by defending champions Japan; their eleventh Asian Championship and their third consecutive title, equalling the record they set in two separate sequences previously: 1955-1959-1962 and 1965-1967-1967.

North Korea made their first, and through 2009, their only appearance at the tournament—finishing 6th—and became the ninth team to contest the championship. South Korea (2nd), Chinese Taipei (3rd), Australia (4th) China (5th) and Philippines (7th) were the other participants.

== Bibliography ==
- Bjarkman, Peter C. (2005). Diamonds Around the Globe: The Encyclopedia of International Baseball. Westport, CT United States: Greenwood Press. ISBN 0-313-32268-6. OCLC 58806121.
