= Baseball in the Philippines =

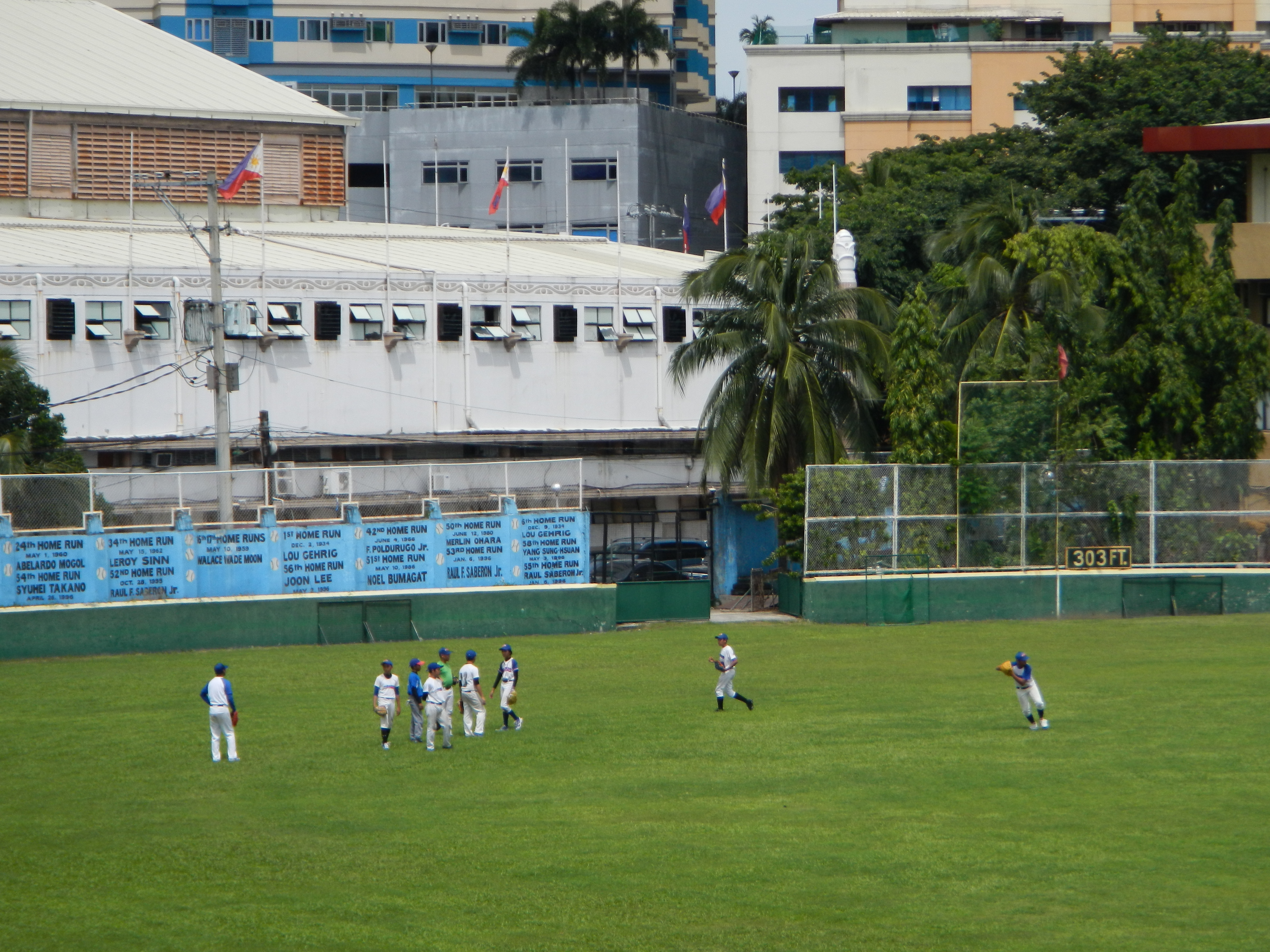
- The Philippines national baseball team in 2013
- Country: Philippines
- Governing body: Philippine Amateur Baseball Association
- National team: Philippines
- First played: 1898

National competitions
- Philippine Baseball League Championship

Club competitions
- Liga Baseball Philippines (2024–present); Philippine Baseball League (2019); Baseball Philippines (inactive)

International competitions
- Southeast Asian Games; World Baseball Classic; Asian Championship; Asian Games

Baseball was introduced in the Philippines during the American colonial period. Baseball was a national pastime in the country. The sport has become a re-emerging sport in the recent years. National policy and programs on baseball are, since 2018, directed by a renewed organization recognized by the Philippine Sports Commission and the Philippine Olympic Committee—the Philippine Amateur Baseball Association (PABA), reestablished the same year.

== Early history ==
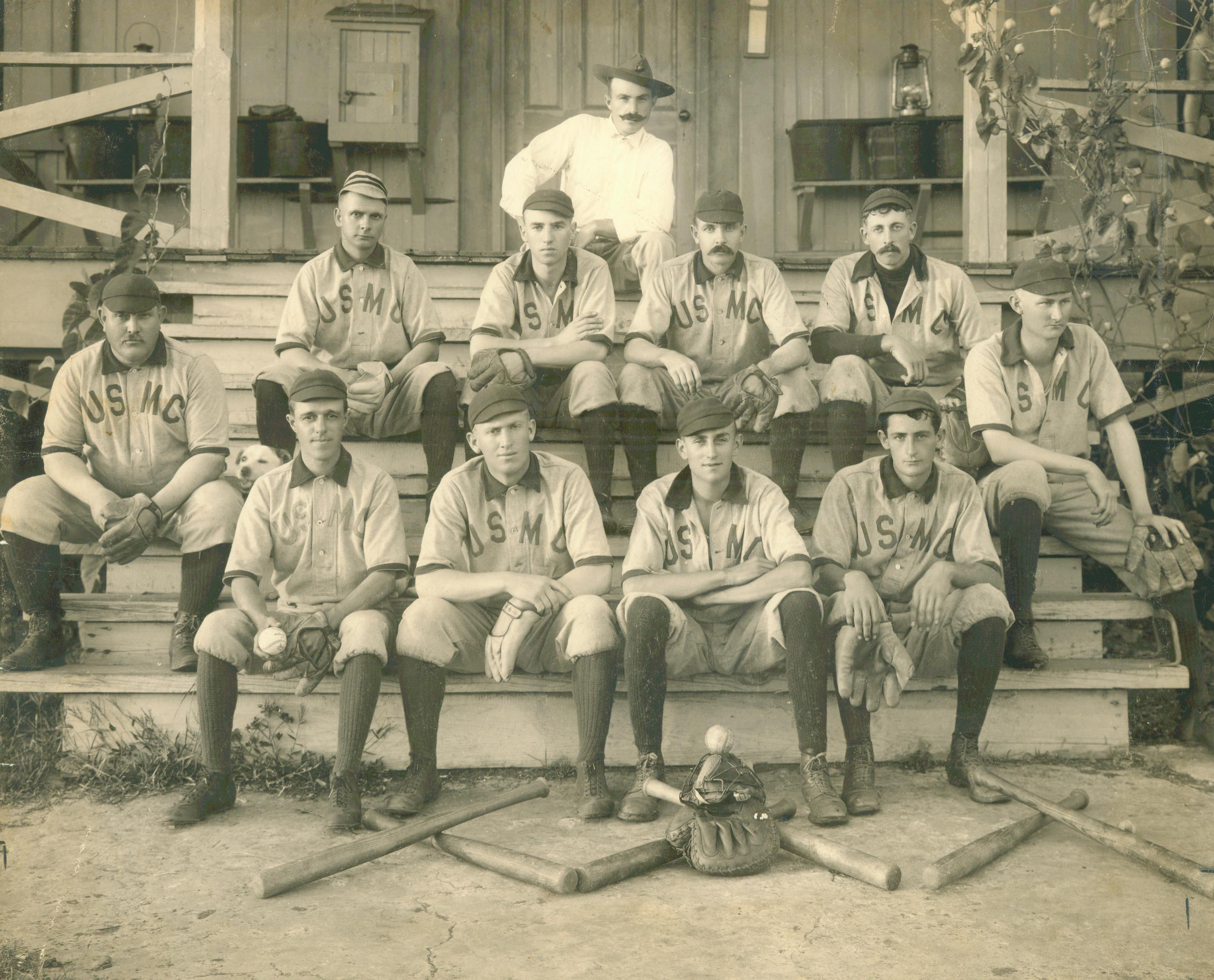
Company B, 2d Regiment Baseball Team in the Philippines, March 1903. The Americans introduced baseball in the Philippines as early as the 1890s.

Baseball was introduced in the Philippines by the Americans. The first baseball game in the Philippines was played in September 1898 weeks after the Battle of Manila, a match between Astor Battery led by George Wetlaufer and a regiment from the American Army. From 1899 to 1900, baseball clubs were established by local Filipinos. The sport's introduction aided the American colonial government's assimilation efforts. General Otis planned to eliminate local cockfighting through the introduction of the sport. A baseball league composing of six clubs was established. Then, Governor General William Howard Taft encouraged baseball in the archipelago. Baseball grew to be a popular sport in the country.

Arlie Pond was instrumental to the growth of baseball in the country.

Baseball's popularity saw a decline from 1898 to 1923 because of claims of neglect by the Department of Public Instruction. Prior to 1998, sporting officials claimed that the department, through the Bureau of Education, had supported baseball in the country with the goal of eliminating cockfighting in the country. Teachers who were brought from the United States to the country had no experience in baseball and even in basic athletics. The Philippine Amateur Athletic Federation favored indoor baseball over its outdoor counterpart. In 1923, the Manila League was the only flourishing league in the country.

== Late 20th century ==
Baseball experienced a boost when the Philippines hosted the first Asian Baseball Championship in 1954 and emerged as champions in the inaugural tournament. Bobby Balcena became the first player of Filipino descent to play in the Major League Baseball in 1956. Baseball continued to be a popular sport up to the mid 1970s. Political conflict among baseball officials led to the decline of the sports in the country. Basketball eventually gained popularity over baseball.

From 1971 to 1994, the Philippines did not take part in any international competition. Baseball suffered from lack of financial support and a decrease of baseball venues. There was also a lack of coverage on television on the sport.

== 21st century ==
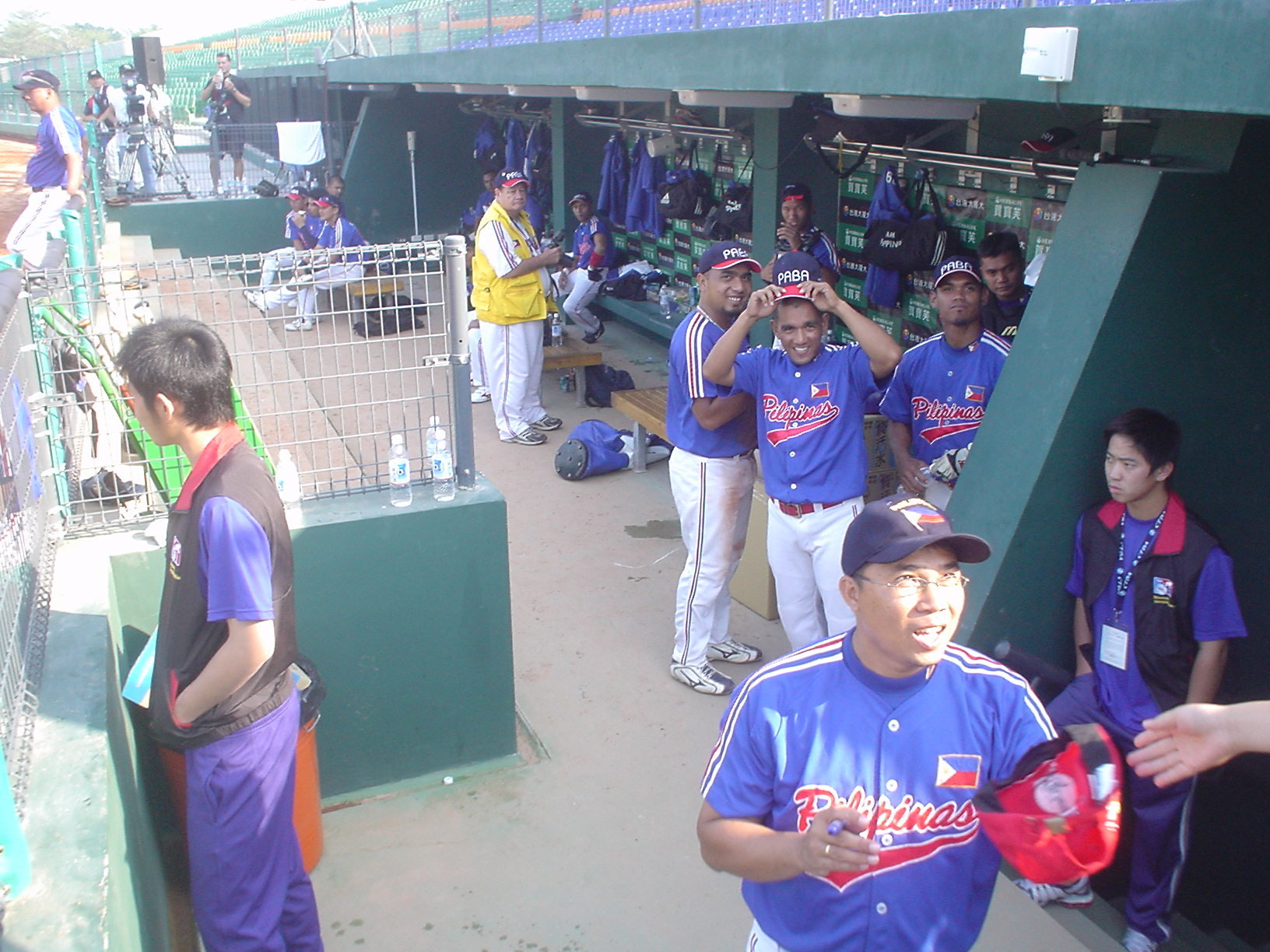
The Philippine national team at the 2006 Intercontinental Cup

Since 2005, the Philippine baseball became a re-emerging sport finishing just behind the three Asian baseball powerhouses. The Philippines became a powerhouse in the ASEAN region and has developed rivalries with Thailand and Indonesia. As part of a growing national revival, the professional Baseball Philippines league was established in 2007, but lasted for 5 years. The league was in 2019 replaced with a brand new league, the Philippine Baseball League (PBL), with a mix of school and corporate teams but only lasted for a year. In 2024, the Liga Baseball Philippines would organize the LBP Tingzon Cup, a league participated by collegiate teams and two teams by Japanese diaspora.

In recent years the country's youth baseball contingents have played in the Little League Baseball regional and international qualifiers as well as in other competitions abroad, and have brought not just national prestige, but also increased interest in the sport among Filipinos, reinforced in the mid-2010s with the broadcasts of the Japanese anime series Major and Ace of Diamond on digital TV channel Yey!, which also doubled up its popularity among the young that now almost every city in the country has a baseball presence, as well as a rising number of public and private elementary and high schools have a youth baseball team, with amateur baseball teams now in the upswing in almost every corner of the country.

== See also ==
- Philippines national baseball team
- Baseball Philippines
- List of baseball stadiums in the Philippines
