= Hung Tai-shan =

Taiwanese baseball player

- Catcher / Outfielder
- Born: January 10, 1924; Kagi, Tainan Prefecture, Taiwan
- Died: June 10, 2019 (aged 95)
- Batted: Left Threw: Right

Member of the Taiwanese

Baseball Hall of Fame
- Induction: 2019
Medals
Men's baseball
Representing Taiwan
Asian Championship
Silver medal – second place	1955 Philippines	Team
Bronze medal – third place	1959 Japan	Team

Hung Tai-shan (Chinese: 洪太山; Wade–Giles: Hung^{2} Tai^{4}-shan^{1}; 10 January 1924 – 10 June 2019) was a Taiwanese baseball catcher and outfielder who played on the Kano baseball team in the Japanese-rule era and several amateur teams after World War II.

== Early life and education ==
Hung was born in Kagi (present-day Chiayi), Tainan Prefecture in 1924. He attended the Kagi Agricultural and Forestry School and played on the baseball team.

== Playing career ==
Hung was a slugger who gained the nickname, “Babe Ruth of Taiwan.” After World War II, Hung moved to Kaohsiung and competed several times in the Provincial Games, representing Penghu and Kaohsiung. In the 1946 Provincial Games, he was batting champion.

Hung represented the Taiwanese national team in 3 consecutive Asian Baseball Championships, acting as team captain in 1954 and 1955. He retired from his playing career following the 1959 tournament.

== Later life and legacy ==
After retiring from playing, Hung served as a consultant for the Kaohsiung Baseball Committee to help develop Taiwanese baseball. He was inducted into the Taiwanese Baseball Hall of Fame in January 2019. He died on 10 June 2019, at the age of 97.
