= Liga Baseball Philippines =

Baseball league in the Philippines

- Sport: Baseball
- Founded: 2024; 2 years ago
- No. of teams: 8
- Country: Philippines
- Most recent champion: KBA Stars (1st title)
- Most titles: IPPC Hawks; KBA Stars (1 title each)

Liga Baseball Philippines (stylized as LIGA Baseball Philippines; abbreviated as LBP) is a semi-professional baseball league in the Philippines.

== History ==
The Liga Baseball Philippines organization launched its baseball tournament in June 2024 in cooperation with the state sports agency Philippine Sports Commission and the national sports association Philippine Amateur Baseball Association. Eight teams took part in the first season and contended for the LBP Tingzon Cup at the Rizal Memorial Baseball Stadium in Manila. The IPPC Hawks became the inaugural champions defeating the UST Golden Sox in the twice-to-win final series.

The second season featuring night games will commence in May 23, 2026 with the trophy named as the LBP Celebrity Cup. League games will be held at the Felino Marcelino Sr. Baseball Stadium in Taguig due to ongoing renovations at the Rizal diamond. Eight teams will still compete, but the IPPC will not be defending their title.

== Teams ==
Team	2024	2026	Ref.
Ateneo Blue Eagles / Wolves	Yes	Yes	
Dumaguete Unibikers / Blue Thunders	Yes	Yes	
De La Salle Unicorns	No	Yes	
PK Holdings Thunderz	Yes	No	
Katayama Baseball Academy Stars	Yes	Yes	
IPPC Hawks	Yes	No	
Muralla Dawgs	No	Yes	
NU Bulldogs	Yes	Yes	
Philippine Air Force	No	Yes	
Samurai U18	Yes	No	
UST Golden Sox	Yes	Yes	
Teams	8	8	

== Results ==
Season	Cup	Champions	Score	Runner-up	Third place	Score	Fourth place	No. of teams	Ref.
2024	Tingzon Cup	IPPC	2–0 (9–5, 12–7)	UST	NU*	1–0 (6–5)	PK Holdings	8	
2026	LBP Season 2	KBA Stars*	2–0 (15–14, 11–1)	NU*	De La Salle Unicorns	1–0 (5–3)	Ateneo Blue Eagles (Wolves)	8	

- (*) Twice-to-beat advantage
