= 2026 East Asia Baseball Cup =

- Event logo

Tournament details
- Country: Philippines
- City: Manila
- Venue: 1 (in 1 host city)
- Dates: December 7 – December 13
- Teams: 6

The 2026 East Asia Baseball Cup is the 15th edition of the tournament, will be held from December 7 to 14, 2026, at Rizal Memorial Baseball Stadium at the Malate in Manila, Philippines. The stadium has underwent renovation ahead of the games.

Hosts Philippines are the defending champions.

== Participants ==
The following teams entered the tournament:

- Hong Kong (32)
- Indonesia (56)
- Philippines (25)
- Singapore (48)
- Thailand (29)
- Vietnam (71)

Rankings as of October 15, 2026

== Results ==
Format to be announced

== Final standings ==
Rank	Team	Pld	W	L
1st place, gold medalist(s)				
2nd place, silver medalist(s)				
3rd place, bronze medalist(s)				
4				
5				
6				
