= Philippine Baseball League =

- Sport: Baseball
- Founded: 2019; 7 years ago
- Folded: 2019
- No. of teams: 12
- Country: Philippines
- Venue: Rizal Memorial Baseball Stadium
- Last champion: Philippine Air Force (1st title)
- Most titles: Adamson University; Philippine Air Force (1 title each)

The Philippine Baseball League was the top baseball league in the Philippines sanctioned by the Philippine Amateur Baseball Association.

It was established in 2019 succeeding the Baseball Philippines league which folded in 2012 and the Chairman's and Commissioners' Cup of the Philippine Sports Commission in 2012. The league shares names with a defunct baseball league of the same name which was active in the 1980s.

== Summary ==
Two conferences were held in 2019. The first season and conference of the league commenced in January 2019. With six of the seven teams participating being collegiate teams also participating in the University Athletic Association of the Philippines (UAAP), the first conference also served as a pre-season event to the UAAP Season 81 baseball tournament. IPPC is the only non-UAAP team which comprises national team players not playing in the UAAP. Adamson University were the inaugural champions of the league defeating the De La Salle University in a one-game final of the league's first conference. Adamson managed to reach the knock-out stages despite finishing third with a 3–3 record in the elimination round.

The second conference of the league took place after the conclusion of the UAAP Baseball Championship. The second conference which started on May 18, 2019 is an Open Conference which featured 12 teams. The tournament is intended as a means to select players for the Philippine national baseball team that will play in the 2019 Southeast Asian Games.

== Teams ==
A total of twelve teams participate in the league with five non-collegiate teams.

2019 Open Conference participants

- Universities and colleges
  - Adamson University
  - Ateneo de Manila University
  - De La Salle Green Batters
  - National University
  - University of the Philippines
  - University of Santo Tomas
- Private and public entities
  - Itakura Parts Philippines Corporation Nationals
  - Philippine Air Force
  - RTU Thunder Alums
  - Thunderz All-Stars
  - Katayama Baseball Academy (KBA) Stars

== Results ==
Season	Conference	Champions	Score	Runner-up	Third place	Score	Fourth place	Teams	Ref.
2019	1st	Adamson University	9–4	De La Salle University	Ateneo de Manila University	10–2	IPPC	7	
2019	2nd	Philippine Air Force	7–4	Thunderz All Stars	Adamson University	4–2	National University	12	
