= 1983 Asian Baseball Championship =

Tournament details
- Country: South Korea
- Teams: 5
- Defending champions: South Korea

Final positions
- Champions: South Korea (4th title)
- Runners-up: Chinese Taipei
- Fourth place: Australia

The 1983 Asian Baseball Championship was the twelfth continental tournament held by the Baseball Federation of Asia. The tournament was held in Seoul, South Korea for the fourth time, and was won by the hosts for their fourth Asian Championship; all four times when hosting the tournament. This was the first time that South Korea had successfully defended their title, and the first time this was achieved by a team other than Japan.

Chinese Taipei and Japan shared second place, the second time that a medal position had been shared in the tournament's history; the previous occurring 20 years earlier at the 1963 tournament, which was also held in Seoul and had the same teams finish for the same medals. Australia (4th) and Philippines (5th) were the other participants.

== Bibliography ==
- Bjarkman, Peter C. (2005). Diamonds Around the Globe: The Encyclopedia of International Baseball. Westport, CT United States: Greenwood Press. ISBN 0-313-32268-6. OCLC 58806121.
