= Baseball at the 2007 SEA Games =

Tournament details
- Country: Thailand
- Dates: 7–14 December
- Teams: 6
- Defending champions: Philippines

Final positions
- Champions: Thailand (1st title)
- Runners-up: Philippines
- Third place: Indonesia
- Fourth place: Myanmar

Baseball was played at the 2007 Southeast Asian Games. The Philippines national baseball team were the defending gold medalists.

The games were held at the Queen Sirikit Sports Center, Pathum Thani Province; the tournament format was a single round-robin, the team with the best record winning the gold medal.

== Medalists ==
Event	Gold	Silver	Bronze
Men	Thailand (THA); Anukul Sudsawad; Anupong Tongsanit; Apichat Ngamying; Arthit Changthed; Chanatip Thongbai; Chidsanu Janrak; Jirapod Srisaipet; Jittiphong Chong-on; Kamonphan Kanjanavisut; Kittiphon Mekmahasachan; Krissada Heebthong; Nattapong Meeboonrod; Nirun Jaroenkitsiriwong; Nusit Phiromya; Panya Prayonghom; Sek Sitthikaew; Somsak Sarnwit; Suparach Teepakakorn; Suthikiat Bunnam; Teerasak Kongsabai; Waraphob Sampahangsit; Yannapat Arpornsiri	Philippines (PHI); Alejandro Velasquez; Andro Cuyugan; Charlie Labrador; Christian Canlas; Christopher Jimenez; Drawin de la Calzada; Edmer del Socorro; Erneste Binarao; Ferdinand Recto; Jon-Jon Robles; Jonash Ponce; Joseph Orillana; Junnifer Pinero; Nino Tator; Roel Empacis; Rommel Roja; Roy Baclay; Ruel Batuto; Ruen Angeles; Rulgencio Rances Jr. Virgilio Roxas; Wilfredo Hidalgo Jr.	Indonesia (INA); Adi Susanto; Ahmad Effendy; Andhika Putra; Andika Susanto; Andospa Saputra; Bara Insamodra Mario; Chindy Yudharana; Gina Mahmud Eru; Indrayosa Pratomo; Iwan Dermawan; Lukman Ramdhoni; Lucky Prasetyo; Mohamad Megawanto; Muhammad Akbar; Prananda Bakti Angga; Purbo Wicaksono; Ra. Bambang Dwitama; Ridzki Aditya; Rizki Ramadhan; Suaiful Noer; Yuno Dewanto

== Standings ==
Team	W	L	PCT	GB	RS	RA	DIFF
Thailand	5	0	1.000	--	67	6	+61
Philippines	4	1	0.800	1	56	6	+50
Indonesia	3	2	0.600	2	70	10	+60
Myanmar	2	3	0.400	3	31	22	+9
Malaysia	1	4	0.200	4	13	113	-100
Cambodia	0	5	0.000	5	8	88	-80

== Results ==
=== Schedule ===
Host Thailand had the most favorable schedule, with two back-to-back games separated by two days, plus their last game against the Philippines was after another rest day.

The Philippines' last three games were played in the last 3 games; Cambodia and Indonesia had to play 4 games in as many days, while Malaysia, Myanmar and the Philippines had to play 3 games in 3 days.

Team	December							
Team	7	8	9	10	11	12	13	14
Cambodia		•	•	•	•		•	
Indonesia	•	•	•	•		•		
Malaysia	•		•	•	•		•	
Myanmar		•	•		•	•	•	
Philippines	•			•		•	•	•
Thailand	•	•			•	•		•

=== December 7 ===
December 7 9:30 a.m.
Team	1	2	3	4	5	R	H	E
Philippines	4	5	9	10	3	31	21	0
Malaysia	0	0	0	1	0	0	2	10

December 7 2:00 p.m.
Team	1	2	3	4	5	6	7	8	9	R	H	E
Thailand	0	0	2	1	0	0	0	0	3	6	1	0
Indonesia	1	0	0	0	0	0	0	0	0	1	3	0

=== December 8 ===
December 8 9:30 a.m.
Team	1	2	3	4	5	6	7	8	9	R	H	E
Indonesia	0	0	0	4	3	0	0	0	1	8	4	3
Myanmar	0	0	0	0	0	0	0	1	1	2	3	5

December 8 2:00 p.m.
Team	1	2	3	4	5	R	H	E
Cambodia	0	0	0	0	0	0	0	4
Thailand	2	1	9	4	x	16	10	0

=== December 9 ===
December 9 9:30 a.m.
Team	1	2	3	4	5	6	R	H	E
Malaysia	0	0	0	1	1	0	2	8	5
Myanmar	2	0	0	7	1	7	17	16	0

December 9 2:00 p.m.
Team	1	2	3	4	5	R	H	E
Cambodia	0	0	0	1	0	1	0	13
Indonesia	11	10	0	16	x	37	23	3

=== December 10 ===
December 10 9:30 a.m.
Team	1	2	3	4	5	R	H	E
Indonesia	7	5	8	2	2	24	17	1
Malaysia	0	0	0	0	0	0	1	4

December 10 2:00 p.m.
Team	1	2	3	4	5	6	7	R	H	E
Cambodia	0	0	0	0	0	0	0	0	0	6
Philippines	0	0	7	3	2	2	x	14	12	0

=== December 11 ===
December 11 9:30 a.m.
Team	1	2	3	4	5	6	7	8	9	R	H	E
Thailand	1	0	0	1	0	4	0	0	0	6	8	1
Myanmar	0	0	0	1	0	0	0	0	0	1	4	2

December 11 2:00 p.m.
Team	1	2	3	4	5	6	7	8	9	R	H	E
Malaysia	2	1	0	0	7	0	0	1	0	11	10	1
Cambodia	3	0	0	0	0	0	1	3	0	7	10	8

=== December 12 ===
December 12 9:30 a.m.
Team	1	2	3	4	5	6	7	8	9	R	H	E
Philippines	1	0	2	1	1	0	0	0	1	6	9	0
Myanmar	1	0	0	0	0	0	0	0	0	1	6	2

December 12 2:00 p.m.
Team	1	2	3	4	5	R	H	E
Malaysia	0	0	0	0	0	0	1	6
Thailand	5	5	6	18	x	34	24	0

=== December 13 ===
December 13 9:30 a.m.
Team	1	2	3	4	5	6	7	R	H	E
Cambodia	0	0	0	0	0	0	0	0	1	5
Myanmar	0	1	0	5	3	1	x	10	14	0

December 13 2:00 p.m.
Team	1	2	3	4	5	6	7	8	9	R	H	E
Philippines	0	0	0	0	0	0	0	1	0	1	6	0
Indonesia	0	0	0	0	0	0	0	0	0	0	4	2

=== December 14 ===
December 14 1:00 p.m.
Team	1	2	3	4	5	6	7	8	9	R	H	E
Philippines	0	0	0	0	0	1	1	0	2	4	9	5
Thailand	1	0	3	0	0	1	0	0	x	5	11	6

Preceded by 2005	Baseball at the Southeast Asian Games; 2007	Succeeded by 2011
