= 1975 Asian Baseball Championship =

Tournament details
- Country: South Korea
- Dates: 21 June – 1 July
- Teams: 5
- Defending champions: Japan

Final positions
- Champions: South Korea (3rd title)
- Runners-up: Japan
- Third place: Australia
- Fourth place: Taiwan

The 1975 Asian Baseball Championship was the eleventh continental tournament held by the Baseball Federation of Asia. The tournament was held in Seoul, South Korea for the third time, and was won by the hosts for their third Asian Championship; all three times when hosting the tournament.

The tournament marked the first and only time Australia secured a medal in the Asian Championships—winning bronze—despite contesting the championship through to the 1993 tournament. Through 2009, Taiwan's 4th-place finish would be the last time they would not achieve a medal in the tournament. Japan (2nd) and Philippines (5th) were the other participants.

== Bibliography ==
- Bjarkman, Peter C. (2005). Diamonds Around the Globe: The Encyclopedia of International Baseball. Westport, CT United States: Greenwood Press. ISBN 0-313-32268-6. OCLC 58806121.
