= Vince Sagisi =

- Head coach / General manager
- Born: San Esteban, Ilocos Sur, Philippines

Teams
- As scout: Texas Rangers; St. Louis Cardinals; Cleveland Indians; As coach and manager: Philippines national baseball team
Medals
Men's baseball
Manager for the Philippines
East Asia Baseball Cup
Gold medal – first place	2024 Philippines	Team

Vincent Sagisi Jr. is a baseball coach and scout. He is the current manager of the Philippines national baseball team.

== Background ==
Sagisi was born in San Esteban, Ilocos Sur in the Philippines. but grew up in the United States.

== Career ==
=== MLB scout ===
In 1999 he became a scout in the Major League Baseball (MLB). Within a period of thirteen years he worked for three teams; Texas Rangers, St. Louis Cardinals and the Cleveland Indians (now Guardians) With Cleveland, Sagisi was assigned to look for prospects in the Los Angeles and Central California areas. He described Filipino American players as "hard to find".

=== Philippines ===
Sagisi was to be part of the Philippines national baseball team which was to take part for the qualifiers of the 2021 World Baseball Classic (later postponed to 2023) in 2020. As recruiting director for Tim Tebow, Chase and Travis d'Arnaud he planned to include them in the Philippine squad. However such plans was cancelled due to the postponement of the qualifiers and tournament proper due to the COVID-19 pandemic and the subsequent withdrawal of the Philippines.

In July 2022, under head coach Bill Picketts, Sagisi served as an assistant coach during the Philippines participation in the West Coast World Series in California, marking their return to competition from a pandemic-induced hiatus.

In 2023, Philippine Amateur Baseball Association (PABA) officials Oscar Martelino and Pepe Munoz invited him to join the Filipino baseball federation. He decided to return to the Philippines after PABA President Chito Loyzaga offered him to become PABA director of baseball operations.

Sagisi became the head coach of the Philippines in June 2024 taking over from Orlando Binarao who decided to focus mentoring the Adamson Falcons in the lead up to the 2024 East Asia Baseball Cup. The Philippines went on to win their fifth straight title, and Sagisi's first title coaching the Philippines.

He continued using his MLB connections, securing Philippine national player Lord Aragorn de Vera a workout invite with the Arizona Diamondbacks.
