= Keiji Katayama =

Japanese baseball coach

- Coach
- Born: 1976 or 1977 (age 48–49)

Teams
- KBA Stars; Philippines national baseball team

Keiji Katayama (片山 圭二, Katayama Keiji) is a Japanese baseball coach based in the Philippines who is a coach for the Philippines national baseball team and the founder of the Katayama Baseball Academy Stars

== Early life and education ==
Katayama was born in 1976 or 1977 and studied at the Himeji Nishi High School, and later at Kansai University. He played in the infield position in school. After graduating, he worked for a baseball glove manufacturer.

== Career ==
Katayama moved to the Philippines by 2006 where he played for semi-professional teams and clubs. In 2012, he became part of the Philippine national baseball team as a "helper" player. In 2017, Katayama became part of the national team coaching staff and later became a consultant for the Philippine Amateur Baseball Association to develop baseball in the Philippines.

In 2019, Katayama created the Katayama Baseball Academy (KBA) Stars to provide opportunity for players in the University Athletic Association of the Philippines after graduation from college. He served both the role of a player and a coach.

The KBA Stars played in the Liga Baseball Philippines both in the 2024 and 2026 seasons.
