= List of international sports events in Australia =

Australia has a rich history of bidding for and hosting major international multi-sport events and world championships. It has hosted two Summer Olympics, one Summer Paralympics and four Commonwealth Games.

== Background ==
Australian Government provides funding for the hosting of major sports events in Australia. It provided $247.3 million in funding for the hosting of the 2000 Sydney Olympics and Paralympics. In recent years, it has provided funding to 2015 Asian Cup, 2015 Cricket World Cup, 2015 Netball World Cup and 2018 Commonwealth Games. For the 2015 Cricket World Cup, it provided $14 million in funding. Its objectives in providing funding were to inspire Australian children to be active as well as providing a boost to the economy. The event held in both Australia and New Zealand was expected to inject $360 million directly into both economies.

Several Australian state and territory governments have established major event organisations to assist in the bidding and financing for major international sporting events in Australia. Their objectives are to improve their economies through tourism and further develop community and sporting facilities. Examples of these organisations are Victorian Major Events Company, Events New South Wales and Tourism and Events Queensland.

The cost of bidding and hosting sporting events has sometimes come under scrutiny. It was reported that Melbourne's 2014 Australian Formula 1 Grand Prix cost taxpayers almost $60 million. This was an additional $9.3 million than 2013 and due to declining ticket sales and increased costs. Australia unsuccessfully bidded for he 2018 FIFA World Cup and 2022 FIFA World Cups. The bid was managed by Football Federation Australia and was granted $42 million in Australian Government funding. The bid came under scrutiny as only one vote out of 22 of the FIFA Executive Committee members was obtained and the ethics of Australia's bidding process.

== International multi-sport competitions ==
Includes international multi-sport events that are held on a regular schedule.

Year	Dates	International Event	City	Sports	Countries	Competitors	Attendance
1938	5–12 February	British Empire Games	Sydney	8	15	464	
1956	22 November – 8 December	Summer Olympic Games	Melbourne	17	72	3,314	1,341,483
1962	22 November – 1 December	British Empire and Commonwealth Games	Perth, Western Australia	9	35	863	224,987
1962	10–17 November	Commonwealth Paraplegic Games	Perth, Western Australia	14	9	93	n/a
1977	20–27 November	FESPIC Games	Sydney	12	15	310	n/a
1982	30 September – 9 October	Commonwealth Games	Brisbane, Queensland	11	46	1,583	481,313
1985	26 January – 5 February	Australia Games	Melbourne	24	31	1,848	92,767
1994	26 September – 8 October 1994	World Masters Games	Brisbane, Queensland	30	74	24,500	n/a
1995	26 February – 4 March	World Police and Fire Games	Melbourne	62	44	6,820	n/a
1997	29 September – 5 October	World Transplant Games	Sydney		58	1,000 (est)	n/a
2000	15 September – 1 October	Summer Olympic Games	Sydney	28	199	10,651	6.7 million tickets sold
2000	18–29 October	Summer Paralympic Games	Sydney	20	127	3,846	1,159,249 tickets sold
2001	29 August – 9 September	5th Goodwill Games	Brisbane, Queensland		14	1300	280,135
2002	2–9 November	Gay Games	Sydney	31	77	12,099	n/a
2002	5–13 October 2002	World Masters Games	Melbourne	26	98	24,886	n/a
2004	30 November – 3 December	Commonwealth Youth Games	Bendigo, Victoria	10	24	1,000 (est)	n/a
2005	5–16 January	Summer Deaflympics	Melbourne	14	63	2,038	n/a
2006	15–26 March	Commonwealth Games	Melbourne	17	71	4,500 (est)	1.5 million tickets sold
2007	16–25 March	World Police and Fire Games	Adelaide, South Australia	75	60	8,000 (est)	n/a
2009	10–18 October	World Masters Games	Sydney	28	95	28,676	n/a
2009	22–30 August	World Transplant Games	Gold Coast, Queensland	12		990	n/a
2013	1–7 December 2013	Special Olympics Asia Pacific Games	Newcastle, New South Wales	9	29	2,500 (est)	n/a
2018	4–15 April	Commonwealth Games	Gold Coast, Queensland	18	71	4,426	1.2 million tickets
2018	18-29 October	Invictus Games	Sydney, New South Wales	12	18	500 estimated	
2019	October	INAS Global Games	Brisbane, Queensland	10	47	1000	
2023	15 - 21 April	World Transplant Games	Perth, Western Australia				
2032	To be determined	2032 Brisbane Olympic Games	Brisbane, Queensland				
2032	To be determined	2032 Brisbane Paralympic Games	Brisbane, Queensland				

(est) – estimate in reports
n/a – not applicable as event primarily for participants and low number of paying spectators

Other international multi-sport events that are held in an Australia on a regular basis are:

- Australian Youth Olympic Festival – commenced in 2007 and is biannual event organised by the Australian Olympic Committee. invited.
- Arafura Games – commenced in 1991 and is biannual event held in Darwin, Northern Territory. Athletes with a disability are invited to compete. It was not held in 2013.

== International sports championships ==
Includes world championships, regional championships and high-profile international events. These events are held throughout the world on a regular schedule.

Sport	Year	Dates	Event	City	Countries	Competitors	Attendance
Aquatic sports – Swimming, Diving, Water Polo, Synchronized swimming	1991	3–13 January	FINA World Championships	Perth, Western Australia	59	1142	42,000
Aquatic sports – Swimming, Diving, Water Polo, Synchronized swimming	1998	8–17 January	FINA World Championships	Perth, Western Australia			
Aquatic sports – Swimming, Diving, Water Polo, Synchronized swimming	2007	18 March – 1 April	FINA World Championships	Melbourne	167	2,158	
Athletics	1985	4–6 October	IAAF World Cup	Canberra, Australian Capital Territory			
Athletics	1987	29 November – 6 December	World Masters Athletics Championships	Melbourne			
Athletics	1996	20–25 August	World Junior Championships	Sydney			
Athletics	2001	1–14 July	World Masters Athletics Championships	Brisbane, Queensland			
Athletics	2016	26 October – 6 November	World Masters Athletics Championships	Perth, Western Australia			
Athletics	2023	18 February	World Athletics Cross Country Championships	Bathurst, New South Wales			
Archery	1977	8 – 11 February	World Championships	Canberra, Australian Capital Territory			
Archery	1987	March	World Championships	Adelaide, South Australia			
Baseball	1985		Asian Baseball Championship	Perth, Western Australia	5		
Baseball	1985	26 February – 7 March	Asian Baseball Championship	Perth, Western Australia	7		
Basketball	1994	2–12 June	FIBA World Championship for Women	Sydney	16	192	
Basketball	2022	23 Sept - 3 Oct	FIBA Women's World Cup	Sydney	12		
Bowls	1966	10–23 October	World Outdoor Championship (Men)	Sydney			
Bowls	1969	4–12 December	World Outdoor Bowls Championship (Women)	Sydney			
Bowls	1980	17 January – 2 February	World Outdoor Championship (Men)	Melbourne			
Bowls	1985	13 February – 4 March	World Outdoor Championship (Women)	Melbourne			
Bowls	1996	18–31 March	World Outdoor Championships (Men)	Adelaide, South Australia			
Bowls	2000	8–26 March	World Outdoor Championship (Women)	Moama, New South Wales			
Bowls	2012	24 November – 9 December 2012	World Outdoor Championships	Adelaide, South Australia	31		
Bowls	2020	23 May – 7 June	World Outdoor Championships	Gold Coast, Queensland			
Boxing	1991	15–23 November	World Amateur Championships	Sydney			
Canoeing	2005	30 September – 4 October	ICF Canoe Slalom World Championships	Sydney			
Canoeing	2025		ICF Canoe Slalom World Championships	Sydney			
Cricket	1988	29 November – 18 December	Women's World Cup	Australia			
Cricket	1992	22 February – 25 March	Men's World Cup	Australia and New Zealand	9		
Cricket	2009	7–22 March	Women's World Cup	Australia	8		
Cricket	2015	14 February – 29 March	Men's World Cup	Australia and New Zealand	14	210	1,016,420 (20,743 per match)
Cricket	2020	21 February - 8 March	ICC Women's T20 World Cup	Australia	10	150	136,549 (86,174 final)
Cricket	2022	16 October -13 November.	ICC Men's T20 World Cup	Australia	16		
Cycling	1989		World BMX Championships	Brisbane, Queensland			
Cycling	1996	20–22 September	UCI Mountain Bike & Trials World Championships	Cairns, Queensland			
Cycling	1997	27–31 August	UCI Track Cycling World Championships	Perth, Western Australia			
Cycling	2003	23–27 July	UCI BMX World Championships	Perth, Western Australia			
Cycling	2004	26–30 May	UCI Track Cycling World Championships	Melbourne			
Cycling	2009	1–6 September	UCI Mountain Bike & Trials World Championships	Canberra, Australian Capital Territory			
Cycling	2009	24–26 July	UCI BMX World Championships	Adelaide, South Australia			
Cycling	2010	29 September – 3 October	UCI Road World Championships	Melbourne and Geelong, Victoria			
Cycling	2012	4–8 April	UCI Track Cycling World Championships	Melbourne			
Cycling	2017		UCI Mountain Bike & Trials World Championships	Cairns, Queensland			
Cycling	2022	18 - 25 September	UCI Road World Championships	Wollongong, New South Wales			
Cycling	2026		UCI BMX World Championships	Brisbane, Queensland			
Football	1981	3–18 October	FIFA World Youth Championship	Australia	16	288	443,094
Football	1993	5–20 March	FIFA World Youth Championship	Australia	16	288	478,003
Football	2015	9–31 January	AFC Asian Cup	Australia	16	368	649,705
Football	2023	10 July–20 August	2023 FIFA Women's World Cup	Australia and New Zealand	32	736	
Gliding	1974	12–27 January	World Championships	Waikerie, South Australia			
Gliding	1987		World Championships	Benalla, Victoria			
Gliding	2001	7–27 January	World Championships	Gawler, South Australia			
Gliding	2016	January	World Championships	Benalla, Victoria			
Golf	1959	18–21 November	Men's World Cup	Melbourne			
Golf	1968	9–12 October	Eisenhower Trophy	Melbourne			
Golf	1972	8–12 November	Men's World Cup	Melbourne	44	88	
Golf	1988	8–11 December	Men's World Cup	Melbourne			
Golf	1998	1–13 December	Presidents Cup	Melbourne			
Golf	2001	3–7 January	WGC-Accenture Match Play Championship	Melbourne			
Golf	2007	7–9 December	Lexus Cup	Perth			
Golf	2008	16–19 October	Eisenhower Trophy	Adelaide			
Golf	2011	17–20 November	Presidents Cup	Melbourne			
Golf	2013	21-24 November	World Cup of Golf	Melbourne			
Golf	2016	24–27 November	World Cup of Golf	Melbourne			
Golf	2018	22–25 November	World Cup of Golf	Melbourne			
Golf	2019	12–15 December	Presidents Cup	Melbourne			
Golf	2028		Presidents Cup	Melbourne			
Golf	2040		Presidents Cup	Melbourne			
Gymnastics	1994	19–24 April	World Artistic Gymnastics Championships	Brisbane, Queensland	54	281	
Gymnastics	1998	9–11 October	Trampoline World Championships	Sydney			
Gymnastics	2005	21–27 November	World Artistic Gymnastics Championships	Melbourne	53	300	40,000
Field hockey	1994	23 November – 4 December	Men's World Cup	Sydney	12		
Field hockey	1990	2 – 13 May	Women's World Cup	Sydney	12		
Field Hockey	2001	9 - 21 October	Men's Junior World Cup	Hobart, Tasmania	16		
Field hockey	2002	24 November – 8 December	Women's World Cup	Perth, Western Australia	16		
Karate	1986	21–25 November	World Championships	Sydney			
Lacrosse	1974		World Men's Championships	Melbourne	4		
Lacrosse	1989		Women's World Cup	Perth, Western Australia			
Lacrosse	1990		World Men's Championships	Perth, Western Australia	5		
Lacrosse	2002	7–15 July	World Men's Championships	Perth, Western Australia	16		
Lifesaving	1956		World Championships	Torquay, Victoria			
Lifesaving	1956		World Championships	Torquay, Victoria			
Lifesaving	1988	April	World Championships	Gold Coast, Queensland			
Lifesaving	2000	March	World Championships	Sydney			
Lifesaving	2006	10–26 February	World Championships	Geelong, Victoria and Lorne, Victoria	32	3,497	
Lifesaving	2012	7–18 November	World Championships	Adelaide, South Australia	40	4,398	
Lifesaving	2016	26 October – 6 November	World Championships	Sydney	Perth, Western Australia		
Modern pentathlon	1966		World Championships	Melbourne			
Modern pentathlon	1985		World Championships (Men)	Melbourne			
Netball	1967		World Championships	Perth, Western Australia			
Netball	1991	July	World Championships	Sydney	20		
Netball	2015	7–16 August	World Cup	Sydney			
Netball	2027		World Cup	Sydney			
Orienteering	1985	4–6 September	World Orienteering Championships	Bendigo, Victoria			
Polo	2001		World Polo Championship	Melbourne, Victoria			
Polo	2017	tba	World Polo Championship	Sydney			
Roller skating	1991	16–20 October	Artistic Skating World Championship	Sydney			
Roller skating	2007	28 October – 10 November	Artistic Skating World Championship	Gold Coast, Queensland			
Rowing	1990	31 October – 4 November	World Rowing Championships	Lake Barrington, Tasmania			
Rugby league	1957		World Cup	Sydney and Brisbane, Queensland			
Rugby league	1968		World Cup	Australia and New Zealand			
Rugby league	1977	May – June	World Cup	Australia and New Zealand	4		109,688
Rugby league	1985–1988		World Cup	Australia	Several countries including Australia		
Rugby league	1989–1992		World Cup	Australia	Several countries including Australia		
Rugby league	2017		World Cup	Australia and New Zealand			
Rugby union	1987	22 May – 20 June	World Cup	Australia and New Zealand	16		
Rugby union	2003	10 October – 22 November	World Cup	Australia	20	600	1,837,547
Rugby union	2021		Women's World Cup	Newcastle, New South Wales			
Rugby union	2027	10 September – 23 October	2027 Rugby World Cup	Various cities			
Rugby union	2029	TBA	2029 Women's Rugby World Cup	Various cities			
Rafting	2019	World Rafting Championships	Tully, Queensland				
Sailing	1987	31 January – 4 February 1987	America's Cup	Fremantle, Western Australia			
Sailing	2011	3–18 December	ISAF World Championships	Perth, Western Australia	76	789	
Shooting	1991	7–13 November	World Shotgun Championships	Perth, Western Australia			
Short track speed skating	1991		World Championships	Sydney			
Softball	1965	February	First Women's World Championship	Melbourne			
Squash	1977	11–21 October	Men's World Open Championship	Adelaide, South Australia			
Squash	1983	4–10 October	Women's World Open Championship	Perth, Western Australia			
Squash	1983	October	Men's World Open Championship	Adelaide, South Australia			
Squash	1990	7–14 March	Women's World Open Championship	Sydney			
Squash	1991	30 July – 4 August	Men's World Open Championship	Adelaide, South Australia			
Squash	1997	13–19 October	Women's World Open Championship	Sydney			
Squash	2001	11–19 October	Women's World Open Championship	Melbourne			
Swimming	1988		FINA World Masters Championships	Brisbane, Queensland			
Swimming	2008	18–25 April	FINA World Masters Championships	Perth, Western Australia			
Swimming	2022	13-18 December	2022 FINA World Swimming Championships (25 m)	Melbourne, Victoria			
Triathlon	1991	12–13 October	ITU World Championships	Gold Coast, Queensland			
Triathlon	1997	16 November	ITU World Championships	Perth, Western Australia			
Triathlon	2000	30 April	ITU World Championships	Perth, Western Australia			
Triathlon	2009	9–13 September	ITU World Championship Series Grand Final	Gold Coast, Queensland			
Triathlon	2018		ITU World Championship Series Grand Final	Gold Coast, Queensland			
Volleyball	1975	12–20 August	Asian Men's Volleyball Championship	Melbourne	7		
Volleyball	1991	11–16 August	Asian Men's Volleyball Championship	Perth, Western Australia	15		
Water skiing	1965		World Championships	Gold Coast, Queensland			
Water skiing	2017	September	World Championships	Adelaide, South Australia			
Weightlifting	1993	11–21 November	World Championships	Melbourne	57	289	
Wheelchair rugby	2018	5-10 August	World Wheelchair Rugby Championships	Sydney			
Wrestling	2012	11–21 November	Oceania Wrestling Championships	Sydney			

== Annual international sporting events ==
International events that are held in Australia annually. These events include both Australian and overseas athletes and teams.

Most national teams including Men's cricket, Southern Stars (women's cricket), Diamonds (women's netball) Socceroos (men's football), Matildas (women's football), Kookaburras (men's hockey), Hockeyroos (women's hockey), Boomers (men's basketball), Opals (women's basketball), Stingers (women's water polo), Sharks (men's water polo) and Volleyroos (men's volleyball) often play international matches in Australia during the year.

Sport	Month Held	Event	City
Paralympic athletics	26 January	Oz Day 10K Wheelchair Road Race	Sydney
Cycling	January	Tour Down Under	South Australia
Equestrian	November	Australian International Three Day Event	Adelaide, South Australia
Golf	November	Australian PGA Championship	Queensland
Golf	November	Australian Masters	Melbourne
Golf	November	Australian Open	Sydney
Golf	February	Women's Australian Open	Various cities
Golf	February	Australian Ladies Masters	Gold Coast, Queensland
Formula One	March	Australian Grand Prix	Melbourne
Motorcycle racing	February	Superbike World Championship Round	Phillip Island, Victoria
Motorcycle racing	October	Australian Grand Prix	Phillip Island, Victoria
Rugby union	Variable	Sevens World Series	Various cities
Rugby union	July – August	The Rugby Championship (formerly Tri Nations)	Various cities
Rugby union	July – August	Bledisloe Cup	Various cities
Surfing	April	Bells Beach Surf Classic	Bells Beach, Victoria
Tennis	January	Sydney International	Sydney
Tennis	January	Brisbane International	Brisbane, Queensland
Tennis	January	Hobart International	Hobart, Tasmania
Tennis	January	Australian Tennis Open	Melbourne
Tennis	January – December	Hopman Cup	Perth, Western Australia
Sailing	December	Sydney to Hobart Yacht Race	Sydney / Hobart, Tasmania

== See also ==
- Sport in Australia
- List of multi-sport events
