= Rizal Memorial Baseball Stadium =

Baseball stadium in Manila, Philippines

Coordinates: 14°33′42″N 120°59′34″E

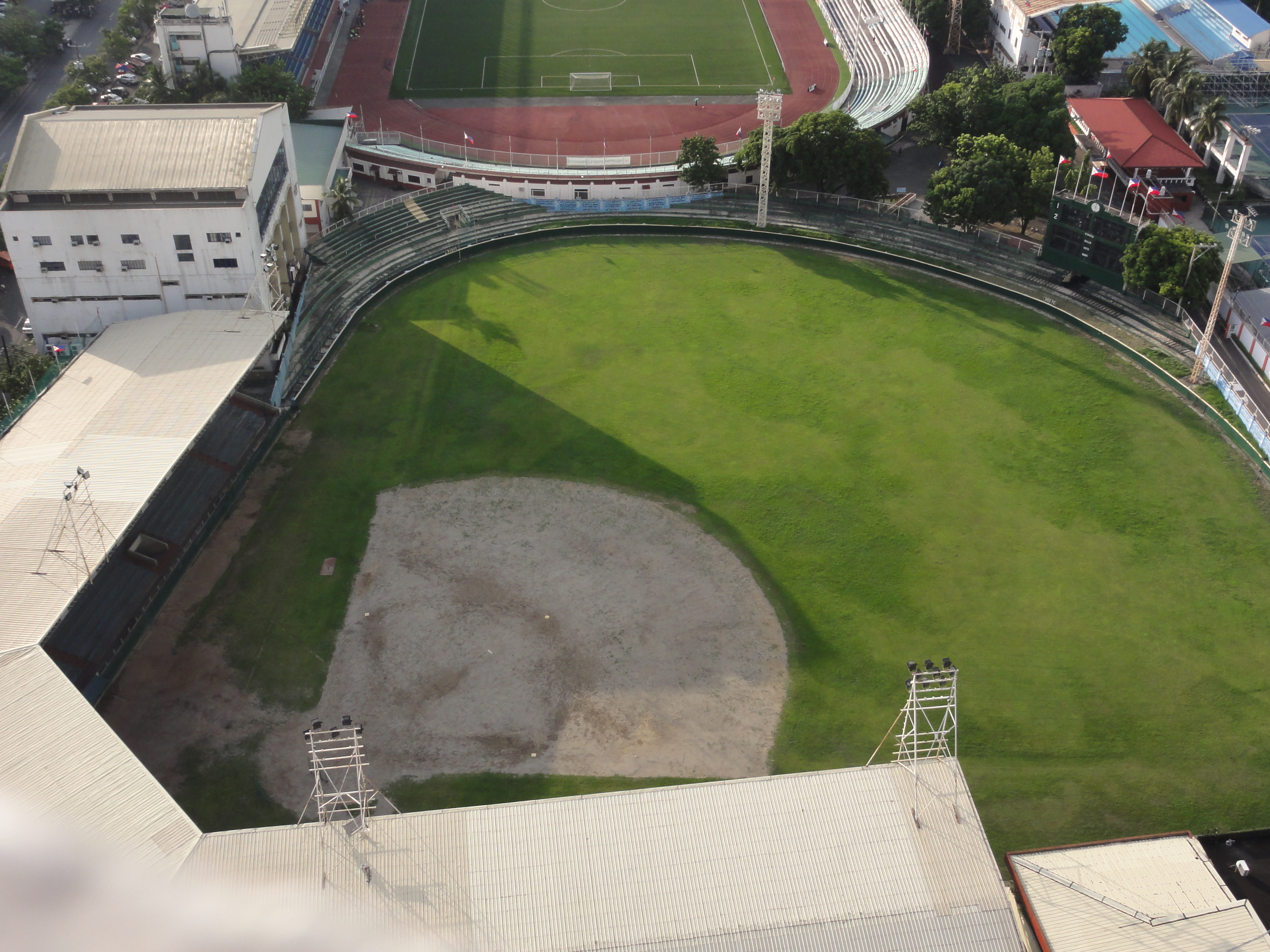
- Aerial view of the stadium. June 2015
- Interactive map of Rizal Memorial Baseball Stadium
- Location: Rizal Memorial Sports Complex, P. Ocampo St. corner Adriatico St., Malate, Manila, Philippines
- Owner: City Government of Manila
- Operator: Philippine Sports Commission
- Field size: Left field: 313 ft (95 m); Left center: 349 ft (106 m); Center field: 385 ft (117 m); Right center: 344 ft (105 m); Right field: 303 ft (92 m)
- Public transit: Vito Cruz

Construction
- Opened: 1934
- Renovated: 1946, 1953, 1981, 1991, 1995, 1996, 2005, 2024
- Architect: Juan Arellano

Tenants
- Philippines national baseball team Baseball Philippines (2007–2012); UAAP Baseball Championship; Philippine Baseball League (2019)

The Rizal Memorial Baseball Stadium is a baseball stadium located inside the Rizal Memorial Sports Complex in Manila, Philippines.

== History ==
=== American colonial period ===
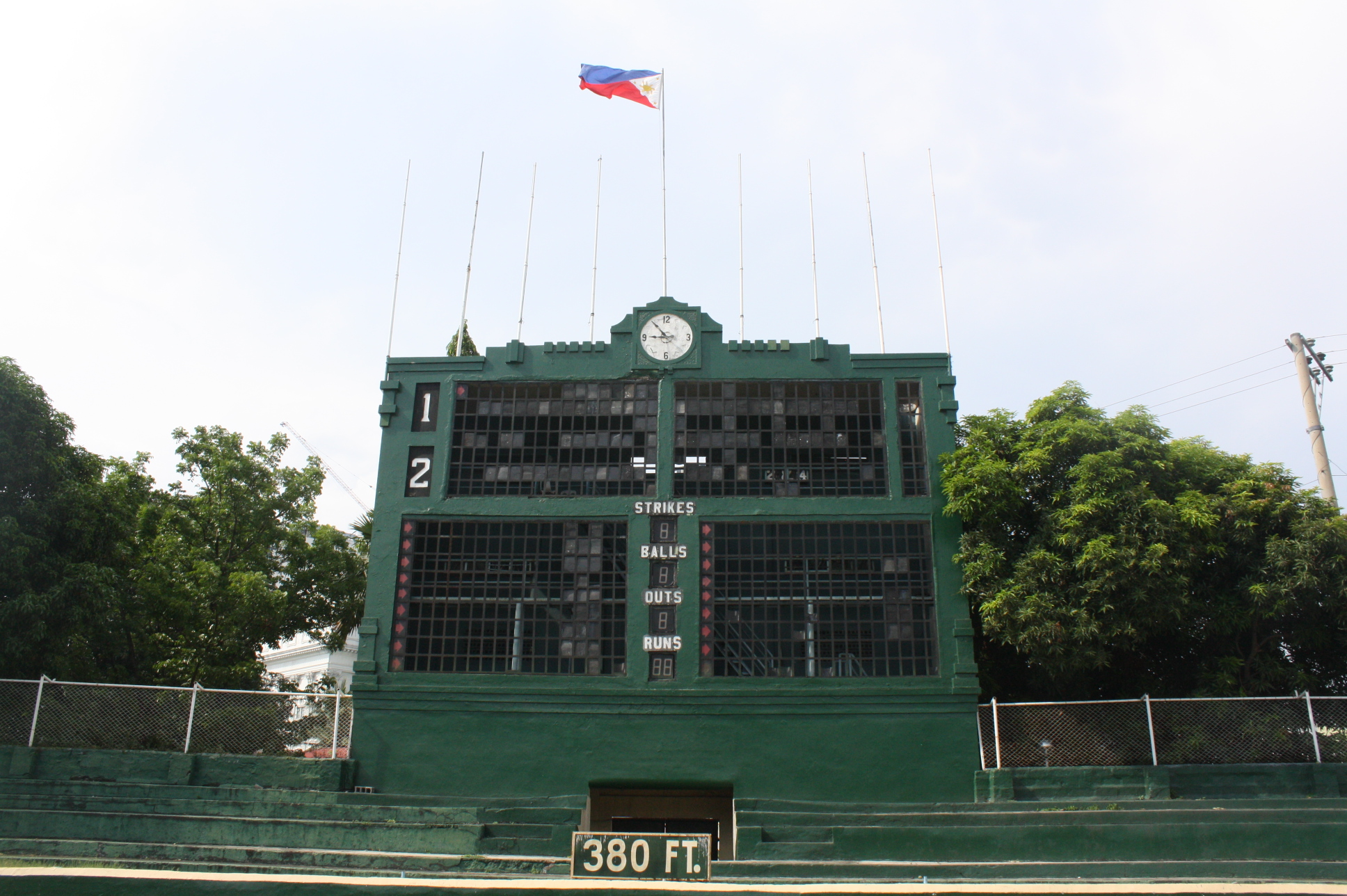
The old score board at the Rizal Memorial Baseball Stadium.

The Far Eastern Championship Games (also known as Far East Games) was a small Asian multi-sport competition considered to be a precursor to the Asian Games. In 1912, E.S. Brown, president of the Philippine Athletic Association and Manila Carnival Games, proposed the creation of the "Far Eastern Olympic Games" to China and Japan. It was at that time that Governor-General William Cameron Forbes was the president of the Philippine Amateur Athletic Association from 1911-1913. Governor-General Forbes formed the Far Eastern Olympic Association.

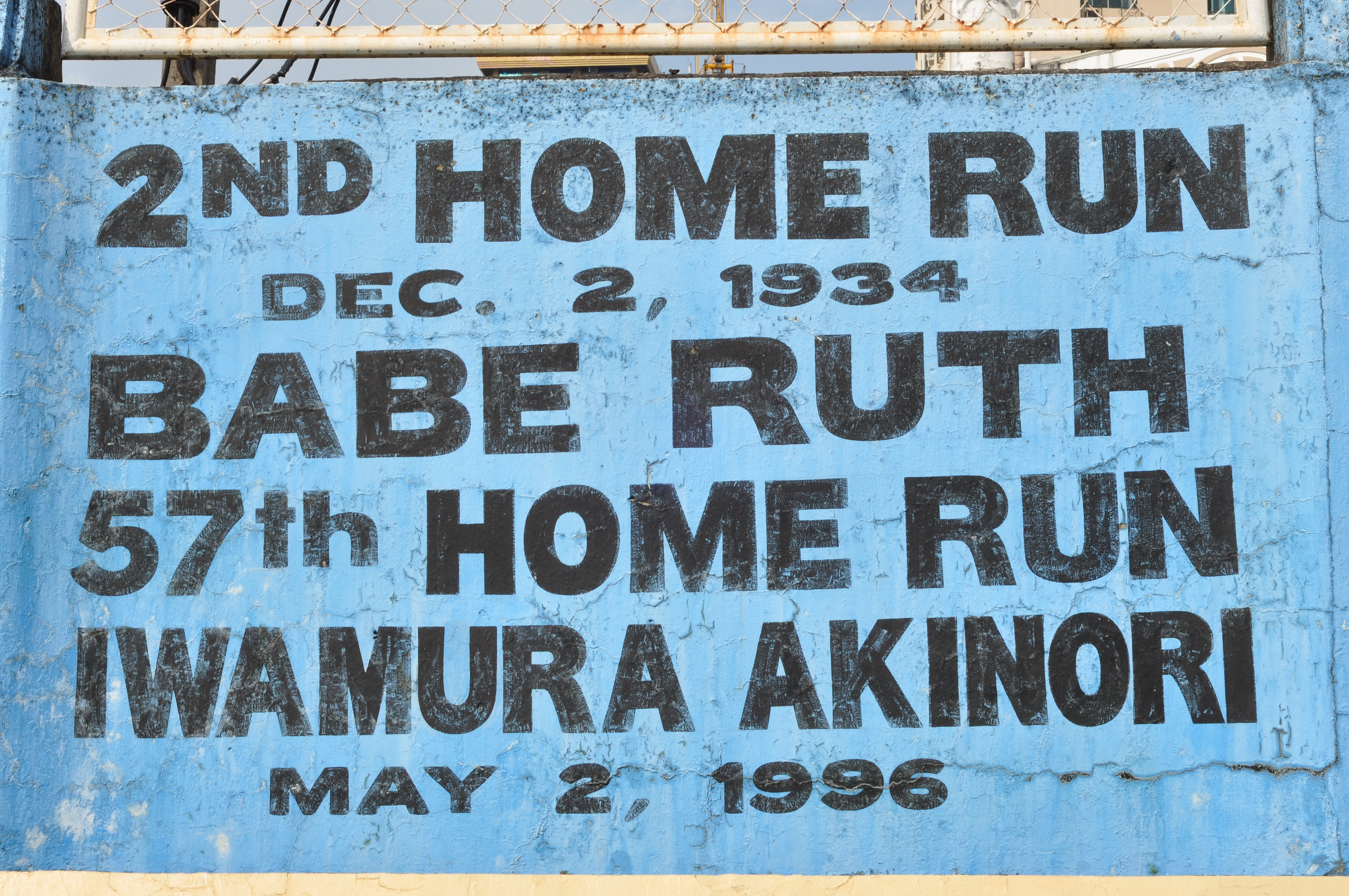
Babe Ruth hit the second home run during the 1934 Far Eastern Championship Games.

The first Far Eastern Championship Games was held in the Manila Carnival Grounds in Malate, Manila, Philippines on February 4, 1913. Forbes was also the one who formally declared the games open. Six countries participated in the eight-day event: The Philippine Islands, Republic of China, Empire of Japan, British East Indies (Malaysia), Kingdom of Thailand and British crown colony Hong Kong. The Philippines also hosted the games in 1925 and 1934.

The Manila Carnival Grounds was redeveloped into the Rizal Memorial Sports Complex in 1934, named in honor of the country's national hero, Jose Rizal, before the 10th Far Eastern Games. Baseball was a main event in every Far Eastern Games and in that year, the games were played at the new Rizal Memorial Baseball Stadium.

Legendary American New York Yankees players Lou Gehrig and Babe Ruth hit the first and second home runs, respectively on December 2, 1934. The game that saw the participation of an all-star team, which included Gehrig, Ruth and Philadelphia Athletics MVP Jimmie Foxx, was one of the highlights of the stadium’s history. The record is etched on the walls of the baseball stadium.

=== World War II ===
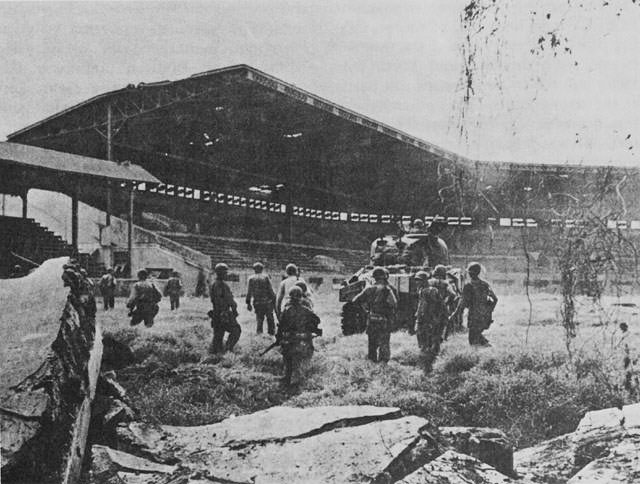
The assault of US Forces against the Japanese Imperial Army during the World War II at the Rizal Memorial Baseball Stadium.

In February 1945, the Japanese forces built a defensive stronghold in their retreat against the advancing American infantry. The stronghold was built in the Harrison Park area, which included De La Salle College and the Rizal Memorial Baseball Stadium. The 1st Cavalry Division of the Americans defeated the Japanese by utilizing three tanks, demolitions, and flamethrowers. The Rizal Memorial Baseball Stadium suffered devastation due to the war.

By April 1945, garrisoned American & Filipino soldiers under the United States Army, Philippine Commonwealth Army & Philippine Constabulary were playing baseball before thousands of spectators at the ruins of the stadium after the liberation. The stadium was repaired with the floodlights of the then newly renovated stadium first opened by January 1946.

=== Post-Commonwealth era ===
The stadium was the venue of the 1954 Asian Baseball Championship. The year 1954 is considered as the beginning of the golden era in Philippine baseball history as the Philippines won first place in the Asian Baseball Championships. The Philippines was the inaugural champions of the Asian Baseball Championships in 1954 but finished fourth in seven of the next eight editions of the biennial events.

The inaugural national softball open in 1965 held night games. However since then, the lights were left to deteriorate.

In the 1990s, the Baseball Stadium underwent renovations. New lights were installed in the stadium in 1995 ahead of the ASAPHIL-PSC Night Softball Tournament. In 1996, new seating and restoration of the air-conditioning system in the VIP room was made for the Far East Little League Championships.

In late 2024, retrofitting of the Baseball Stadium began to upgrade the facilities to be in accordance to international standards. This will include a covered roof over an improved grandstand or spectators’ area, a high-resolution LED scoreboard, and protective netting and stainless-steel railings with glass. The renovated baseball stadium will have a seating capacity of 10,000. Renovation is set to finished by November 2026, ahead of the Philippines' hosting of the 2026 East Asia Baseball Cup.

== Architecture ==
The Rizal Memorial Stadium is considered to be an Art Deco architectural design that incorporated streamlines and simpler lines, flat surfaces and rounded edges. The design represented stability and modernity. The complex, built under the supervision of architect Juan Arellano, started construction in 1927.

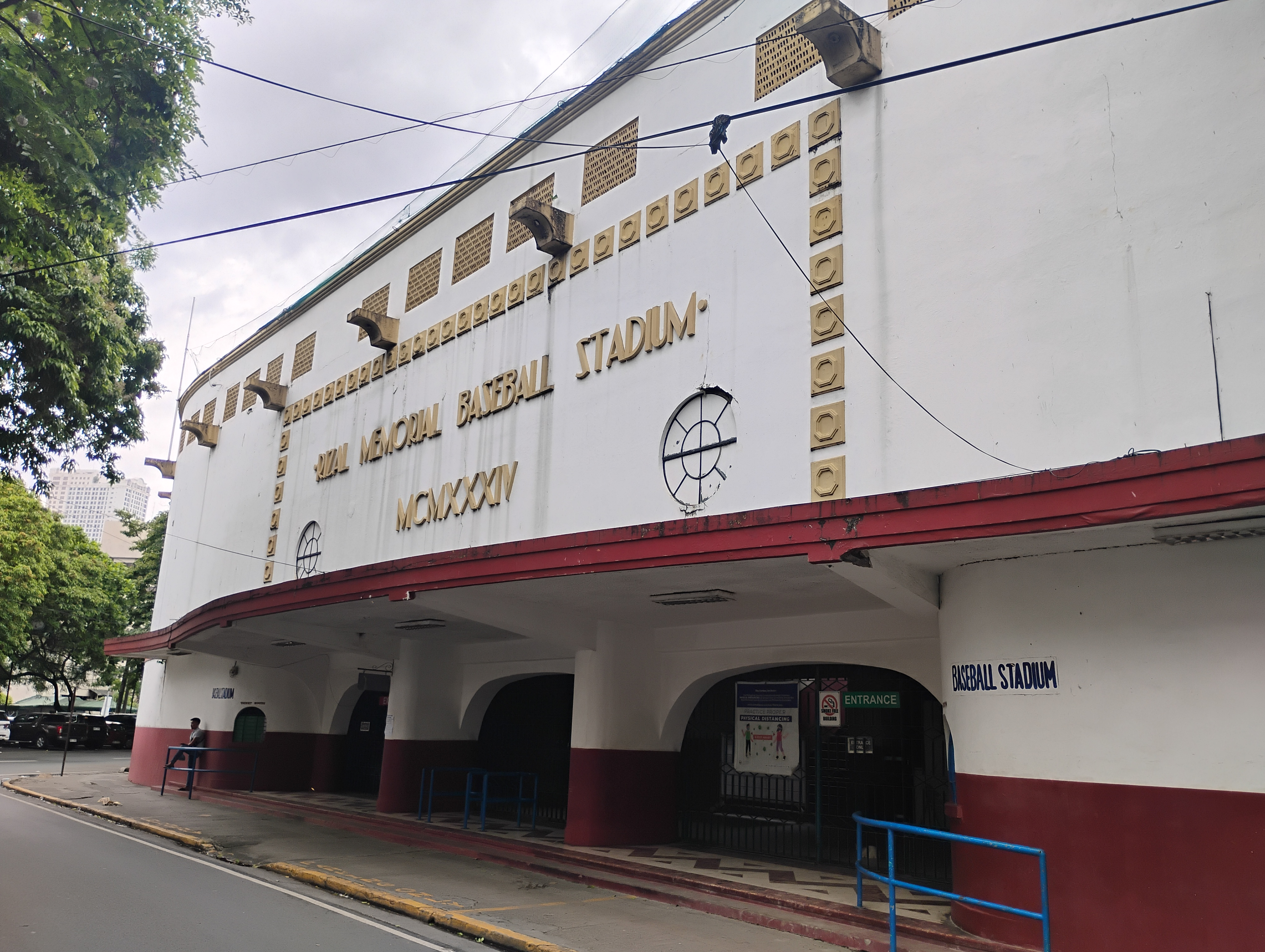
The stadium's facade featuring Art Deco lettering

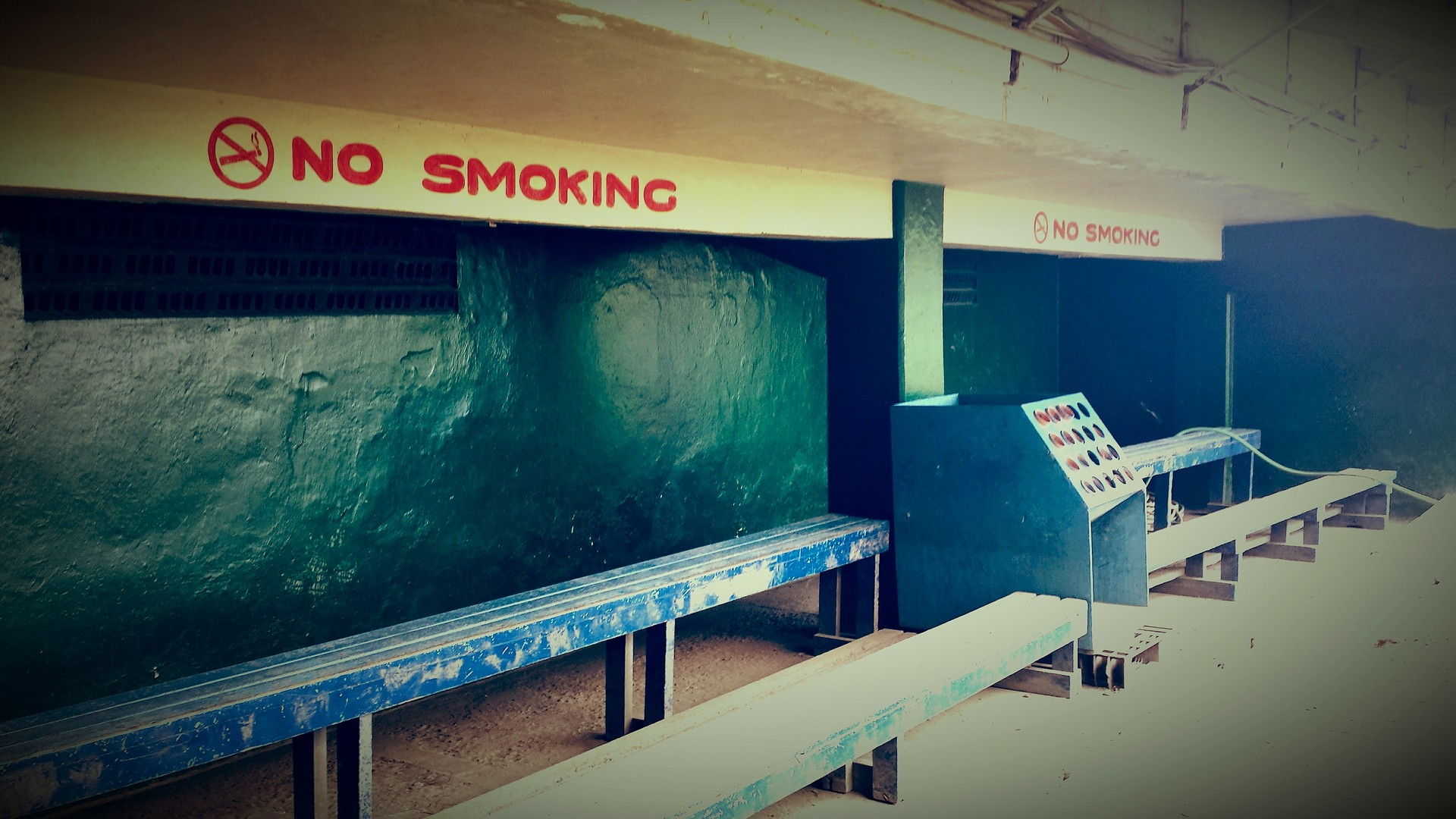
Stadium's bullpen

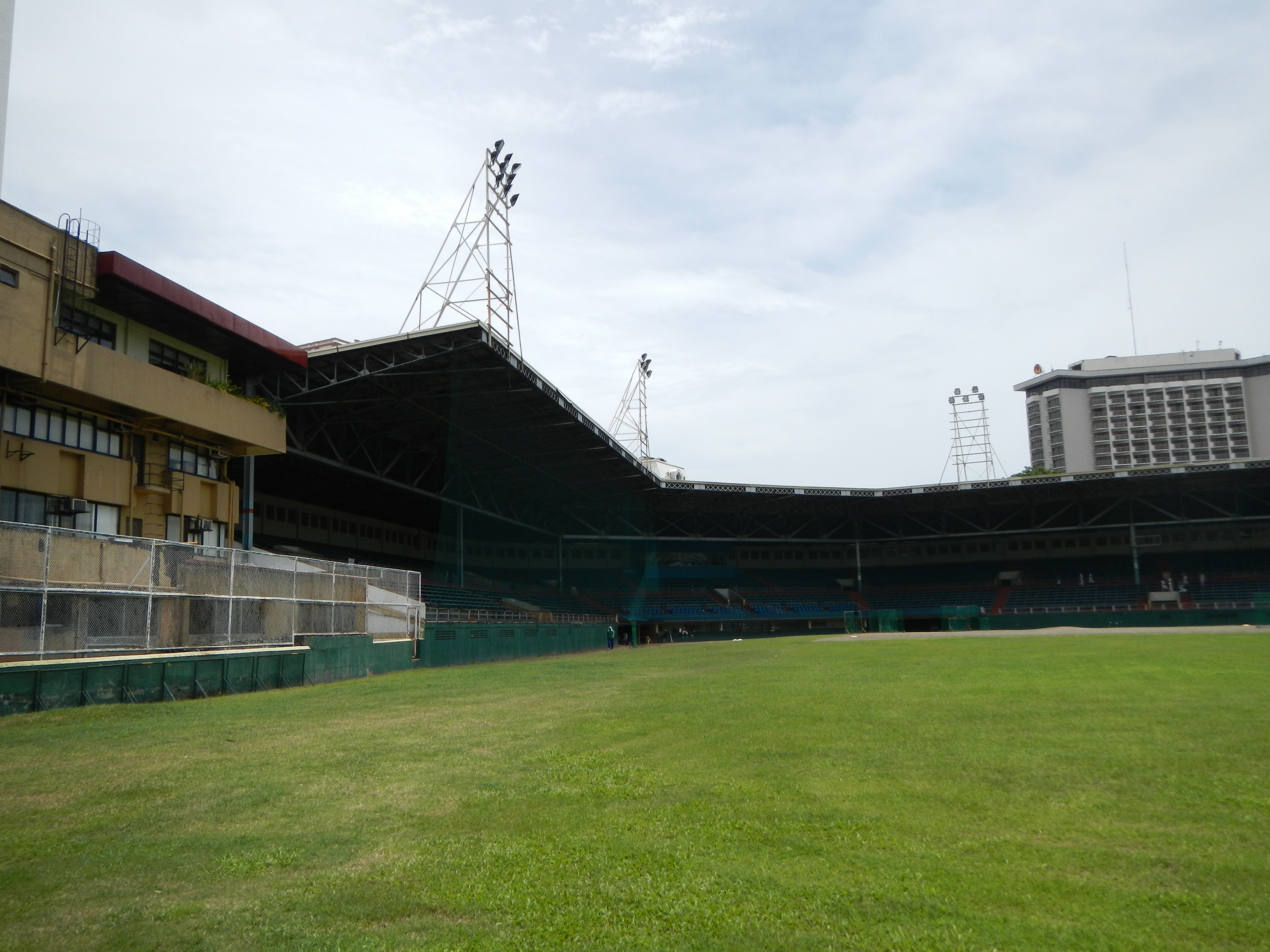
Grandstand of the stadium

== See also ==
- Rizal Memorial Sports Complex
- Rizal Memorial Stadium
- Rizal Memorial Coliseum
