= Korea national baseball team =

Korea national baseball team may refer to:

- North Korea national baseball team, the men's baseball team representing North Korea
- South Korea national baseball team, the men's baseball team representing South Korea
  - South Korea women's national baseball team, the women's baseball team representing South Korea
