= 1973 Asian Baseball Championship =

Tournament details
- Country: Philippines
- Teams: 5
- Defending champions: South Korea

Final positions
- Champions: Japan (7th title)
- Runners-up: South Korea
- Third place: Taiwan
- Fourth place: Philippines

The 1973 Asian Baseball Championship was the tenth continental tournament held by the Baseball Federation of Asia. The tournament was held in Manila, Philippines for the fourth time. The tournament was won by Japan; their seventh Asian Championship. Defending champions South Korea (2nd), Taiwan (3rd), Philippines (4th) and Australia (5th) were the other participants.

== Bibliography ==
- Bjarkman, Peter C. (2005). Diamonds Around the Globe: The Encyclopedia of International Baseball. Westport, CT United States: Greenwood Press. ISBN 0-313-32268-6. OCLC 58806121.
