= Orlando Binarao =

- Head coach

Teams
- As a player: Adamson Falcons; Philippine Navy; Philippines national baseball team; Philippines national softball team; As coach and manager: Adamson Falcons; Philippine Navy; Philippines national baseball team
Medals
Men's baseball
the Philippines
Asia Cup
Gold medal – first place	1995 Manila	Team
Men's softball
the Philippines
Asian Championship
Silver medal – second place	2003 Manila	Team
SEA Games
Gold medal – first place	2015 Singapore	Team
Gold medal – first place	2011 Jakarta-Palembang	Team
Gold medal – first place	2007 Nakhon Ratchasima	Team

Orlando Binarao is a Filipino baseball coach and former baseball and softball player.

== Career ==
=== Playing career ===
Binarao hails from Zamboanga City, taking part in provincial softball and baseball games. He was scouted by Filomeno Codiñera, and became part of the Adamson University. He played for the Adamson Falcons in the University Athletic Association of the Philippines (UAAP) and other national tournaments from 1989 to 1994. As a baseball player, he is known as a pitcher.

He was part of the Philippine Navy's softball and baseball team.

==== National teams ====
Binarao was part of both the Philippine baseball and softball national teams He took part in the 2000 and 2004 Men's Softball World Championship and the 2003 Asian Men's Softball Championship. His last participation as a player was at the 2015 SEA Games, helping the team win a gold medal.

=== Coaching career ===
Codiñera handed Binarao the coaching role for the Adamson Falcons in 2005. He led the Falcons to three straight championships from Seasons 70 to 72 (2007–08, 2008–09, 2009–10). The team won the baseball championship again in Season 80 in 2018.

Binarao also became head coach of the Philippine national baseball team, helping them win the 2025 SEA Games gold.
