= Baseball at the Far Eastern Championship Games =

Baseball was contested at the Far Eastern Championship Games and was one of the main eight sports on the programme.

Among the three regular nations, the Philippines and Japan were the most developed in terms of baseball. Filipino baseball grew in popularity during the American colonial period at the turn of the 20th century, while baseball in Japan had an even longer history, having been first introduced in 1872. Correspondingly, over the ten editions of the games the Philippines won the baseball competition on six occasions to Japan's four victories. China never won the Far Eastern Championship Games baseball title.

== Editions ==
Games	Year	Host city	Host country	Champions
I	1913	Manila	Philippines	Japan
II	1915	Shanghai	China	Philippines
III	1917	Tokyo	Japan	Japan
IV	1919	Manila	Philippines	Philippines
V	1921	Shanghai	China	Philippines
VI	1923	Osaka	Japan	Philippines
VII	1925	Manila	Philippines	Philippines
VIII	1927	Shanghai	China	Japan
IX	1930	Tokyo	Japan	Japan
X	1934	Manila	Philippines	Philippines

== Medal summary ==
As 1934

Rank	Nation	Gold	Silver	Bronze	Total
1	Philippines	6	4	0	10
2	Japan	4	6	0	10
3	China	0	0	10	10
Totals (3 entries)		10	10	10	30
