= North Korea national baseball team =

National baseball team of North Korea

Information
- Country: North Korea
- Confederation: WBSC Asia

The North Korea national baseball team is the national baseball team of North Korea. The team represents North Korea in international competitions.

The team was organized by the Baseball and Softball Association of DPR Korea, the governing body for baseball in North Korea from 1987. The current association for the sport is the Baseball Association of DPR of Korea which applied for membership in the World Baseball Softball Confederation in July 2025.

The last publicly known participation in an international competition by the North Korea national baseball team was at the 1993 Asian Baseball Championship.

== International appearances ==
North Korea national baseball team
Year	Venue	Competition	Rank	W–L
1991	Japan	Pan Pacific Baseball Championship	4th	1–3
1993	Australia	Asian Baseball Championship	6th	1–5
