= 1971 Asian Baseball Championship =

Baseball tournament

Tournament details
- Country: South Korea
- Dates: 9–16 September
- Teams: 5
- Defending champions: Japan

Final positions
- Champions: South Korea (2nd title)
- Runners-up: Japan
- Third place: Philippines
- Fourth place: Australia

The 1971 Asian Baseball Championship was the ninth continental tournament held by the Baseball Federation of Asia. The tournament was held in Seoul, South Korea for the second time, and was won by the hosts for their second Asian Championship; both times when hosting the tournament.

The tournament marked the first time the Australian team participated in the Asian Championships—or in any international tournament—finishing 4th. Through 2009, the Philippines' bronze medal would be the last time they would achieve a medal in the tournament. Japan (2nd) and Taiwan (5th) were the other participants.

== Bibliography ==
- Bjarkman, Peter C. (2005). Diamonds Around the Globe: The Encyclopedia of International Baseball. Westport, CT United States: Greenwood Press. ISBN 0-313-32268-6. OCLC 58806121.
