= Baseball at the 2005 SEA Games =

Tournament details
- Country: Philippines
- Dates: 28 November - 4 December
- Teams: 5

Final positions
- Champions: Philippines (1st title)
- Runners-up: Thailand
- Third place: Indonesia
- Fourth place: Myanmar

Baseball at the 2005 Southeast Asian Games was held at the Rizal Memorial Sports Complex in Manila, Philippines. Baseball will not be played in the 2012 Olympic Games. However, in 2006, the World Baseball Classic was held, and it will be staged in 2009 and four years after. Baseball traditionally is not a SEA Games official sport event but was added this edition of the SEA Games due to its popularity among the host country. This is one of the events exclusively for men.

== Medal winners ==
Gold	Silver	Bronze
Philippines	Thailand	Indonesia

== Preliminary round ==
Pos	Team	W	L	RF	RA	RD	PCT	GB	Qualification
1	Philippines	4	0	76	5	+71	1.000	—	Advance to Semi-final round
2	Thailand	3	1	44	17	+27	.750	1	Advance to Semi-final round
3	Indonesia	2	2	32	30	+2	.500	2	Advance to Semi-final round
4	Myanmar	1	3	25	37	−12	.250	3	Advance to Semi-final round
5	Malaysia	0	4	1	89	−88	.000	4	

November 28, 2005; 10:00 PHT; Preliminary Round	Philippines	38–0	Malaysia	Rizal Memorial Baseball Stadium, Manila, Philippines

November 28, 2005; 14:00 PHT; Preliminary Round	Thailand	14–6	Indonesia	Rizal Memorial Baseball Stadium, Manila, Philippines

November 29, 2005; 10:30 PHT; Preliminary Round	Indonesia	5–11	Philippines	Rizal Memorial Baseball Stadium, Manila, Philippines

November 29, 2005; 14:00 PHT; Preliminary Round	Malaysia	1–19	Myanmar	Rizal Memorial Baseball Stadium, Manila, Philippines

November 30, 2005; 10:30 PHT; Preliminary Round	Thailand	17–0	Malaysia	Rizal Memorial Baseball Stadium, Manila, Philippines

November 30, 2005; 14:00 PHT; Preliminary Round	Philippines	17–0	Myanmar	Rizal Memorial Baseball Stadium, Manila, Philippines

December 1, 2005; 10:30 PHT; Preliminary Round	Malaysia	0–15	Indonesia	Rizal Memorial Baseball Stadium, Manila, Philippines

December 1, 2005; 14:00 PHT; Preliminary Round	Thailand	13–1	Myanmar	Rizal Memorial Baseball Stadium, Manila, Philippines

December 2, 2005; 10:00 PHT; Preliminary Round	Thailand	0–10	Philippines	Rizal Memorial Baseball Stadium, Manila, Philippines

December 2, 2005; 14:00 PHT; Preliminary Round	Indonesia	6–5	Myanmar	Rizal Memorial Baseball Stadium, Manila, Philippines

== Knockout round ==
Semifinals
1	Philippines	9
4	Myanmar	1
3	Indonesia	4
2	Thailand	12

Finals
Philippines	11
Thailand	0
Third place
Myanmar	2
Indonesia	3

=== Semi-final round ===
December 3, 2005; 10:30 PHT; Preliminary Round	Philippines	9–1	Myanmar	Rizal Memorial Baseball Stadium, Manila, Philippines

December 3, 2005; 14:30 PHT; Preliminary Round	Indonesia	4–12	Thailand	Rizal Memorial Baseball Stadium, Manila, Philippines

=== Final round ===
Baseball Bronze Match
Team	1	2	3	4	5	6	7	8	9	R	H	E
Indonesia	1	0	0	0	0	1	0	1	0	3	6	1
Myanmar	1	0	0	0	0	0	0	0	1	2	4	3

Baseball Finals
Team	1	2	3	4	5	6	7	8	9	R	H	E
Thailand	0	0	0	0	0	1	0	0	X	0	5	3
Philippines	0	2	0	3	0	0	0	6	X	11	12	2
