= Kano baseball team =

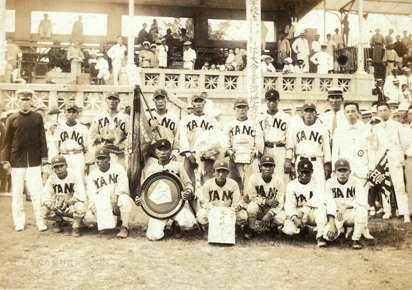
Kano baseball team in 1931

The Kano baseball team (Japanese: 嘉農野球部, Hepburn: Kanō yakyūbu), officially the Kagi Agricultural and Forestry School baseball team (嘉義農林學校野球部, Kagi Nōrin gakkō yakyūbu), was a Taiwanese baseball team established in 1928 in Japanese Formosa. The team was a motley crew that consisted of Han Chinese (Hoklo and Hakka), Taiwanese indigenous people, and Japanese players. The high school baseball team in Kagi (modern-day Chiayi) qualified to represent the island at Koshien, Japan's long-running nationwide high school baseball tournament, in 1931. Performing beyond all expectations, the underdog team miraculously went on to the championship game before finally losing to a powerful Japanese squad, ultimately taking second place out of twenty-three teams that year.

The amazing success of a team from a colonized land making to the finals was totally unexpected, and it ultimately earned the Taiwanese baseball players greater respect from their Japanese counterparts. The Kano experience also encouraged more people in Taiwan to play baseball, eventually making it the "national sport" in Taiwan.

Kano, a Taiwanese film depicting the baseball team, was released on February 27, 2014.

== Notable players ==
- Shosei Go
- Hung Tai-shan
