= 2001 Asian Baseball Championship =

The 2001 Asian Baseball Championship was the 21st installment of the tournament. The championship took place at Xinzhuang Baseball Stadium in Taipei County (now New Taipei City), Republic of China (Taiwan, competing as Chinese Taipei). Chinese Taipei national baseball team won the competition for the fourth time in the competition's history.

== Top four ==
No.	Country
1	Chinese Taipei
2	South Korea
3	Japan
4	Philippines

== See also ==
- List of sporting events in Taiwan

== Extetnal links ==
- baseball-reference.com
