= 1963 Asian Baseball Championship =

Tournament details
- Country: South Korea
- Teams: 4
- Defending champions: Japan

Final positions
- Champions: South Korea (1st title)
- Runners-up: Japan; Taiwan
- Fourth place: Philippines

The 1963 Asian Baseball Championship was the fifth continental tournament held by the Baseball Federation of Asia. The tournament was held in Seoul, South Korea for the first time, and was won by the hosts for their first Asian Championship. Japan and Taiwan shared second place, the first time that a medal position had been shared in the tournament's history. Philippines were the other participants.

== Bibliography ==
- Bjarkman, Peter C. (2005). Diamonds Around the Globe: The Encyclopedia of International Baseball. Westport, CT United States: Greenwood Press. ISBN 0-313-32268-6. OCLC 58806121.
