= 1962 Asian Baseball Championship =

Tournament details
- Country: Taiwan
- Teams: 4
- Defending champions: Japan

Final positions
- Champions: Japan (3rd title)
- Runners-up: Taiwan
- Third place: South Korea
- Fourth place: Philippines

The 1962 Asian Baseball Championship was the fourth continental tournament held by the Baseball Federation of Asia. The tournament was held in Taipei, Taiwan for the first time. It was the third time Japan had won the tournament, having won all three Asian Championships in a row. Taiwan (2nd), South Korea (3rd) and Philippines (4th) were the other participants.

== See also ==
- List of sporting events in Taiwan

== Bibliography ==
- Bjarkman, Peter C. (2005). Diamonds Around the Globe: The Encyclopedia of International Baseball. Westport, CT United States: Greenwood Press. ISBN 0-313-32268-6. OCLC 58806121.
