= Felino Marcelino Sr. Baseball Stadium =

Baseball park in Taguig, Philippines

- Interactive map of Felino Marcelino Sr. Baseball Stadium
- Address: Brgy Ususan; Taguig, Metro Manila; Philippines
- Coordinates: 14°31′39″N 121°04′02″E
- Capacity: 850
- Type: Ballpark
- Surface: Artificial turf

Construction
- Built: 2010
- Rebuilt: 2019–2025

The Felino Marcelino Sr. Baseball Stadium is a ballpark in Taguig, Metro Manila, Philippines.

== History ==
=== Old stadium ===
Taguig Mayor Sigfrido Tiñga announced plans to construct a baseball stadium in honor of Felino Marcelino Sr. in Barangay Ususan in Taguig in 2009. Marcelino was a city councilor credited for introducing the sport of baseball and softball in the barangay.

The Felino Marcelino Baseball Stadium constructed by 2010 and hosted the Dunkin' Donuts Baseball Philippines Series VI. The tournament held in August 2010 was won by the Manila Sharks at the expense of the Cebu Dolphins.

=== Current stadium ===
The Taguig city government brought in Bill Bennett of Asia Ballfield System Specialists and co-founder of the Guam Amateur Baseball Association in 2019 as a design consultant for a new baseball field project. A new baseball stadium was built in the early 2020s. It was opened to the public under Mayor Lani Cayetano in May 2025.

== Facilities ==
The Felino Marcelino Sr. Baseball Stadium has a 13,900-square-meter (150,000 sq ft) artificial turf diamond with a seating capacity of 850. It has a LED scoreboard and lighting.
