= 2017 Asian Baseball Championship =

Tournament details
- Country: Taiwan
- Dates: October 2–8, 2017
- Teams: 7
- Defending champions: South Korea

Final positions
- Champions: Japan (19th title)
- Runners-up: Chinese Taipei
- Third place: South Korea
- Fourth place: Philippines

The 28th 2017 Asian Baseball Championship was the international baseball competition for Asian men's national teams. It was held in Taipei and New Taipei, Taiwan on October 2–8, 2017. It was the 28th edition of the tournament.

== Qualified teams ==
- Chinese Taipei – Host and 2nd place of the 2015 Asian Baseball Championship
- South Korea - 1st place at the 2015 Asian Baseball Championship
- Japan – 3rd place at the 2015 Asian Baseball Championship
- ~~China – 4th place at the 2015 Asian Baseball Championship~~^{a}
- Sri Lanka – 1st place at the 2017 West Asian Cup
- Pakistan - 2nd place at the 2017 West Asian Cup
- Hong Kong - World Ranking ^{b}
- Philippines - World Ranking ^{b}

Notes

^a The association of the hosting nation, the Chinese Taipei (Taiwan) Baseball Association, announced the withdrawal of China. "Delay in administrative procedures" and difficulty of purchasing return flight tickets for the Chinese delegation due to Golden Week holiday in China was cited as issues which caused China's withdrawal. ^b It was originally planned to have the top two teams from the Eastern division of the 2017 Asian Baseball Cup qualify. However, the East Asia Cup had to be cancelled due to a lack of a host, so Hong Kong and Philippines were invited based on WBSC and BFA Rankings.

== Group stage ==
The first stage would consist of each team playing against each other team in its group once. With the withdrawal of China, all games originally planned for China were considered forfeits and wins for the opposition.

=== Group A ===
Rk	Team	W	L	HTH	RS	IPO	RA	IPD	TQB
1	Chinese Taipei	3	0	-					
2	South Korea	2	1	−					
3	Philippines	1	2	−					
4	Sri Lanka	0	3	−					

NOTE: Tiebreaker notes: HTH − Head-to-head. RS − Runs scored. IPO − Innings the team batted. RA − Runs against. IPD − Innings the team pitched. TQB − The index of (RS/IPO)−(RA/IPD).

Korea vs Sri Lanka

October 2, 09:30 at Tianmu Baseball Stadium (F/5)
Team	1	2	3	4	5	6	7	8	9	R	H	E
Sri Lanka	0	0	0	0	0	-	-	-	-	0	2	1
South Korea	3	6	1	8	X	-	-	-	-	18	19	0
WP: Kim Sung-han LP: Sampath Ruwan Kumara; Home runs: SRI: None; KOR: Choi Min Jae; Umpires: Chu Hsu-Kuang (Chinese Taipei) , Wu Shao-An (Chinese Taipei) , Cheung Sui-Man (Hong Kong) , Hussain Zafar (Pakistan); Boxscore

Taiwan vs Philippines

October 2, 18:30 at Xinzhuang Baseball Stadium (F/7)
Team	1	2	3	4	5	6	7	8	9	R	H	E
Philippines	0	2	0	0	0	0	0	-	-	2	2	2
Chinese Taipei	2	0	5	3	0	0	2X	-	-	12	16	0
WP: Wu Chun-chieh LP: Jon-Jon V. Robles; Home runs: PHI: None; TPE: Lin Chia Yu (1), Lin Tzu Chieh (1); Umpires: Kim Dae-nam (South Korea) , Daito Atsushi (Japan) , Liu Chun-te (Chinese Taipei) , Xu Guang-hao (Chinese Taipei); Boxscore

Philippines vs Sri Lanka

October 3, 18:30 at Tianmu Baseball Stadium
Team	1	2	3	4	5	6	7	8	9	R	H	E
Sri Lanka	0	3	0	0	0	0	0	2	0	5	6	3
Philippines	0	0	3	1	0	0	1	3	x	8	9	3
WP: Romeo E. Jasmin Jr. LP: Jayarathne Sanjeewa Sv: Junmar Diarao; Home runs: SRI: None; PHI: Jonnash R. Ponce; Umpires: Li Chih-Hao (Chinese Taipei) , Wu Shao-An (Chinese Taipei) , Tsao Wen-Lung (Chinese Taipei) , Zafar Hussein (Pakistan); Boxscore

Chinese Taipei vs Korea

October 3, 18:30 at Xinzhuang Baseball Stadium
Team	1	2	3	4	5	6	7	8	9	10	R	H	E
South Korea	0	0	0	0	0	0	0	1	0	1	2	6	2
Chinese Taipei	0	0	0	0	0	0	0	1	0	2	3	7	2
WP: Lin An-ko LP: Kang Dong-yeon; Umpires: Daito Atsushi (Japan) , Cheung Sui-man (Chinese Taipei) , Rances Fulgencio Jr. (Philippines) , Chu Hsu-kuang (Chinese Taipei); Boxscore

Korea vs Philippines

October 4, 18:30 at Tianmu Baseball Stadium (F/6)
Team	1	2	3	4	5	6	7	8	9	R	H	E
Philippines	0	0	1	2	0	0	-	-	-	3	3	4
South Korea	0	6	1	2	3	6	-	-	-	18	19	1
WP: Park Min Ho LP: Lesmar M. Ventura; Home runs: PHI: None; KOR: Moon Sang Chul (1); Umpires: Cheung Sui-Man (Hong Kong) , Chu Hsu-Kuang (Chinese Taipei) , Xu Guang-Hao (Chinese Taipei) , Song Ye-Mong (Chinese Taipei); Boxscore

Sri Lanka vs Taiwan

October 4, 18:30 at Xinzhuang Baseball Stadium (F/7)
Team	1	2	3	4	5	6	7	8	9	R	H	E
Chinese Taipei	0	1	0	7	1	2	2	-	-	13	12	0
Sri Lanka	0	0	0	0	0	0	0	-	-	0	3	6
WP: Chang Kuo Hao LP: Karunarathne Chirath; Umpires: Fulgencio Rances Jr. (Philippines) , Li Chih-Hao (Chinese Taipei) , Kim Dae nam (South Korea) , Daito Atsushi (Japan); Boxscore

=== Group B ===
Rk	Team	W	L	HTH	RS	IPO	RA	IPD	TQB
1	Japan	2	0	-					
2	Hong Kong	1	1	−					
3	Pakistan	0	2	−					

NOTE: Tiebreaker notes: HTH − Head-to-head. RS − Runs scored. IPO − Innings the team batted. RA − Runs against. IPD − Innings the team pitched. TQB − The index of (RS/IPO)−(RA/IPD).

Japan vs Hong Kong

October 2, 12:00 at Xinzhuang Baseball Stadium (F/5)
Team	1	2	3	4	5	6	7	8	9	R	H	E
Hong Kong	0	0	0	0	0	x	x	x	x	0	2	2
Japan	9	18	3	0	x	x	x	x	x	30	21	0
WP: Masaki Tanigawa LP: Leung Chung Hei; Home runs: HKG: None; JPN: Kazuki Kamizato (1); Umpires: Fulgencio Rances Jr. (Philippines) , Sujeewa Wijayanayake (Sri Lanka) , Tsao Wen-Lung (Chinese Taipei) , Chen Hua-Wei (Chinese Taipei); Boxscore

Pakistan vs Japan

October 3, 12:00 at Xinzhuang Baseball Stadium (F/7)
Team	1	2	3	4	5	6	7	8	9	R	H	E
Japan	3	2	2	4	1	0	1	-	-	13	15	2
Pakistan	0	0	0	0	0	0	0	-	-	1	4	2
WP: Kenya Suzuki LP: Muhammad Wuli; Home runs: JPN: Ryo Kinami; PAK: None; Umpires: Wijayanayake Sujeewa (Sri Lanka) , Kim Dae-nam (South Korea) , Song Ye-mong (Chinese Taipei) , Wu Hsin-yung (Chinese Taipei); Boxscore

Hong Kong vs Pakistan

October 4, 12:00 at Tianmu Baseball Stadium
Team	1	2	3	4	5	6	7	8	9	R	H	E
Pakistan	1	0	0	0	0	0	0	0	0	1	8	1
Hong Kong	0	1	0	0	1	0	0	2	x	4	10	0
WP: Mok Wing Tung LP: Ullah Ihsan Sv: Khan Inayat Ullah; Umpires: Wu Shao-An (Chinese Taipei) , Chen Hua-Wei (Chinese Taipei) , Sujeewa Wijayanayake (Sri Lanka) , Tsao Wen-Lung (Chinese Taipei); Boxscore

== See also ==
- List of sporting events in Taiwan
