= 1969 Asian Baseball Championship =

Tournament details
- Country: Taiwan
- Teams: 4
- Defending champions: Japan

Final positions
- Champions: Japan (6th title)
- Runners-up: Taiwan
- Third place: Philippines
- Fourth place: South Korea

The 1969 Asian Baseball Championship was the eighth continental tournament held by the Baseball Federation of Asia. The tournament was held in Taipei, Taiwan for the second time. Won by Japan for the sixth time, it was the third consecutive Asian Championship for the team; the second such sequence for Japan. It was only the second time in the tournament's history that the Philippines team medalled, winning the bronze medal. Taiwan (2nd) and South Korea (4th) were the other participants.

== See also ==
- List of sporting events in Taiwan

== Bibliography ==
- Bjarkman, Peter C. (2005). Diamonds Around the Globe: The Encyclopedia of International Baseball. Westport, CT United States: Greenwood Press. ISBN 0-313-32268-6. OCLC 58806121.
