= 1965 Asian Baseball Championship =

Tournament details
- Country: Philippines
- Teams: 4
- Defending champions: South Korea

Final positions
- Champions: Japan (4th title)
- Runners-up: South Korea
- Third place: Taiwan
- Fourth place: Philippines

The 1965 Asian Baseball Championship was the sixth continental tournament held by the Baseball Federation of Asia. The tournament was held in Manila, Philippines for the third time. Won by Japan for the fourth time, it was the first of what would be three consecutive Asian Championship wins in a row; the second such sequence for Japan. Defending champions South Korea (2nd), Taiwan (3rd) and Philippines (4th) were the other participants.

== Bibliography ==
- Bjarkman, Peter C. (2005). Diamonds Around the Globe: The Encyclopedia of International Baseball. Westport, CT United States: Greenwood Press. ISBN 0-313-32268-6. OCLC 58806121.
