= 2005 Asian Baseball Championship =

The 2005 Asian Baseball Championship was the 23rd installment of the tournament. Japan won the competition for the second consecutive time.

== Top four ==
No.	Country
1	Japan
2	Chinese Taipei
3	China
4	South Korea
