= 1985 Asian Baseball Championship =

Tournament details
- Country: Australia
- Teams: 5
- Defending champions: South Korea

Final positions
- Champions: Japan (8th title)
- Runners-up: South Korea
- Third place: Chinese Taipei
- Fourth place: Australia

The 1985 Asian Baseball Championship was the thirteenth continental tournament held by the Baseball Federation of Asia. The tournament was held in Perth, Western Australia; the first time that the tournament had been held outside the continent of Asia. The tournament was won by Japan; their eighth Asian Championship.

China made their first appearance at the tournament—finishing 5th—and became the sixth team to contest the championship, while Philippines did not participate—the first time that one of the original four teams to participate had not appeared at the tournament. Defending champions South Korea (2nd), Chinese Taipei (3rd) and Australia (4th) were the other participants.

== Bibliography ==
- Bjarkman, Peter C. (2005). Diamonds Around the Globe: The Encyclopedia of International Baseball. Westport, CT United States: Greenwood Press. ISBN 0-313-32268-6. OCLC 58806121.
