= 1967 Asian Baseball Championship =

Tournament details
- Country: Japan
- Teams: 4
- Defending champions: Japan

Final positions
- Champions: Japan (5th title)
- Runners-up: South Korea
- Third place: Taiwan
- Fourth place: Philippines

The 1967 Asian Baseball Championship was the seventh continental tournament held by the Baseball Federation of Asia. The tournament was held in Tokyo, Japan for the second time. Won by Japan for the fifth time, it was the second of what would be three consecutive Asian Championship wins in a row; the second such sequence for Japan. The order of all teams was repeated for the first time in the tournament's history with South Korea finishing 2nd, Taiwan in 3rd and Philippines in 4th.

== Bibliography ==
- Bjarkman, Peter C. (2005). Diamonds Around the Globe: The Encyclopedia of International Baseball. Westport, CT United States: Greenwood Press. ISBN 0-313-32268-6. OCLC 58806121.
