= 1987 Asian Baseball Championship =

Tournament details
- Country: Japan
- Teams: 7
- Defending champions: Japan

Final positions
- Champions: Chinese Taipei (1st title)
- Runners-up: Japan
- Third place: South Korea
- Fourth place: Guam

The 1987 Asian Baseball Championship was the fourteenth continental tournament held by the Baseball Federation of Asia. The tournament was held in Tokyo, Japan for the third time. The tournament was won by Chinese Taipei; their first gold medal in the Asian Baseball Championship.

Guam (4th) and India (7th) both made their first appearances at the tournament and became the seventh and eighth teams to contest the championship. Defending champions Japan (2nd), South Korea (3rd), Australia (5th) and China (6th) were the other participants.

== Bibliography ==
- Bjarkman, Peter C. (2005). Diamonds Around the Globe: The Encyclopedia of International Baseball. Westport, CT United States: Greenwood Press. ISBN 0-313-32268-6. OCLC 58806121.
