= 1959 Asian Baseball Championship =

Tournament details
- Country: Japan
- Teams: 4
- Defending champions: Japan

Final positions
- Champions: Japan (2nd title)
- Runners-up: South Korea
- Third place: Taiwan
- Fourth place: Philippines

The 1959 Asian Baseball Championship was the third continental tournament held by the Baseball Federation of Asia. The tournament was held in Tokyo, Japan for the first time. It was the second time Japan had won the tournament, and was the second of what would be three consecutive Asian Championship wins in a row. South Korea (2nd), Taiwan (3rd) and Philippines (4th) were the other participants.

== Bibliography ==
- Bjarkman, Peter C. (2005). Diamonds Around the Globe: The Encyclopedia of International Baseball. Westport, CT United States: Greenwood Press. ISBN 0-313-32268-6. OCLC 58806121.
