= 1955 Asian Baseball Championship =

Tournament details
- Country: Philippines
- Teams: 4
- Defending champions: Philippines

Final positions
- Champions: Japan (1st title)
- Runners-up: Taiwan
- Third place: South Korea
- Fourth place: Philippines

The 1955 Asian Baseball Championship was the second continental tournament held by the Baseball Federation of Asia. The tournament was held in Manila, Philippines for the second time. Won by Japan, it was the first of what would be three consecutive Asian Championship wins in a row. Taiwan (2nd), South Korea (3rd) and Philippines (4th) were the other participants.

== Bibliography ==
- Bjarkman, Peter C. (2005). Diamonds Around the Globe: The Encyclopedia of International Baseball. Westport, CT United States: Greenwood Press. ISBN 0-313-32268-6. OCLC 58806121.
