= Asian Baseball Championship =

Baseball competition

- Most recent season or competition: 2025 Asian Baseball Championship
- Sport: Baseball
- Founded: 1954; 72 years ago
- No. of teams: 8 (in 2025)
- Continent: Asia
- Most recent champions: Japan (2025)
- Most titles: Japan (21 titles)

The Asian Baseball Championship is the main championship tournament between national baseball teams in Asia, governed by the Baseball Federation of Asia (BFA). It is held every other year in odd-numbered years and since 1983 it also functions as the qualification games for the Baseball at the Summer Olympics if the event year is exactly one year before the Olympics. In even-numbered years, the Asian Baseball Cup is held, to determine two qualifiers — one from the Eastern Division and one from the Western Division — to join teams from China, Taiwan, Japan, and South Korea. The competition has been dominated by teams from Japan, South Korea and Taiwan.

== Medals (1954-2025) ==
Rank	Nation	Gold	Silver	Bronze	Total
1	Japan	21	8	2	31
2	South Korea	8	10	10	28
3	Chinese Taipei	5	14	9	28
4	Philippines	1	0	2	3
5	China	0	0	2	2
6	Australia	0	0	1	1
Totals (6 entries)		35	32	26	93

== Results ==
#	Year	Final Host	Champions	Runners-up	3rd place	Teams
1	1954; Details	(Philippines); Manila	Philippines	Japan	South Korea	4
2	1955; Details	(Philippines); Manila	Japan	Taiwan	South Korea	4
3	1959; Details	(Japan); Tokyo	Japan	South Korea	Taiwan	4
4	1962; Details	(Taiwan); Taipei	Japan	Taiwan and South Korea (Tied for Runners-up)		4
5	1963; Details	(South Korea); Seoul	South Korea	Taiwan and Japan (Tied for Runners-up)		4
6	1965; Details	(Philippines); Manila	Japan	South Korea	Taiwan	4
7	1967; Details	(Japan); Tokyo	Japan	South Korea	Taiwan	4
8	1969; Details	(Taiwan); Taipei	Japan	Taiwan	Philippines	4
9	1971; Details	(South Korea); Seoul	South Korea	Japan	Philippines	5
10	1973; Details	(Philippines); Manila	Japan	South Korea	Taiwan	5
11	1975; Details	(South Korea); Seoul	South Korea	Japan	Australia	5
12	1983; Details	(South Korea); Seoul	Chinese Taipei, Japan and South Korea (Tied for Champions)			5
13	1985; Details	(Australia); Melbourne	Japan	Chinese Taipei and South Korea (Tied for Runners-up)		5
14	1987; Details	(Japan); Tokyo	Chinese Taipei	Japan	South Korea	7
15	1989; Details	(South Korea); Seoul	South Korea, Chinese Taipei and Japan (Tied for Champions)			7
16	1991; Details	(China); Beijing	Japan	Chinese Taipei	South Korea	7
17	1993; Details	(Australia); Perth	Japan	South Korea	Chinese Taipei	7
18	1995; Details	(Japan); Kurashiki	Japan	South Korea	Chinese Taipei	6
19	1997; Details	(Taiwan); Taipei	South Korea	Japan	Chinese Taipei	6
20	1999; Details	(South Korea); Seoul	South Korea	Japan	Chinese Taipei	6
21	2001; Details	(Taiwan); Taipei	Chinese Taipei	South Korea	Japan	5
22	2003; Details	(Japan); Sapporo	Japan	Chinese Taipei	South Korea	7
23	2005; Details	(Japan); Miyazaki	Japan	Chinese Taipei	China	6
24	2007; Details	(Taiwan); Taichung	Japan	South Korea	Chinese Taipei	7
25	2009; Details	(Japan); Sapporo	Japan	Chinese Taipei	South Korea	7
26	2012; Details	(Taiwan); Taichung	Japan	Chinese Taipei	South Korea	6
27	2015; Details	(Taiwan); Taichung	South Korea	Chinese Taipei	Japan	6
28	2017; Details	(Taiwan); New Taipei City	Japan	Chinese Taipei	South Korea	7
29	2019; Details	(Taiwan); Taichung	Chinese Taipei	Japan	China	8
30	2023; Details	(Taiwan); Taipei, New Taipei City, Taichung	Japan	Chinese Taipei	South Korea	8
31	2025; Details	(China); Pingtan	Japan	Chinese Taipei	South Korea	8

== Nations (1954-2025) ==
1. Chinese Taipei - 31 Editions - East
2. Japan - 31 Editions - East
3. South Korea - 31 Editions - East
4. Philippines - 28 Editions - South East
5. China - 15 Editions - East
6. Pakistan - 9 Editions - South
7. Australia - 8 Editions - Pacific
8. Thailand - 8 Editions - South East
9. Hong Kong - 6 Editions - East
10. Indonesia - 4 Editions - South East
11. Guam - 3 Editions - Pacific
12. India - 2 Editions - South
13. Palestine - 2 Editions - West
14. Sri Lanka - 2 Editions - South
15. North Korea - 1 Editions - East

== See also ==
- Women's Baseball Asian Cup
- Asia Series
- Baseball awards#Asia
