= Philippines national baseball team =

Information
- Country: Philippines
- Federation: Philippine Amateur Baseball Association
- Confederation: WBSC Asia
- Manager: Orlando Binarao
- Captain: Romeo Jasmin Jr.
- Team Colors: Blue, Crimson Red, White, Gold

WBSC ranking
- Current: 25 ▼1 (26 October 2026)
- Highest: 22 (31 December 2012)
- Lowest: 42 (28 March 2023)

Olympic Games
- Appearances: 0

World Baseball Classic
- Appearances: 0

WBSC Premier12
- Appearances: 0

World Cup
- Appearances: 1 (first in 2001)
- Best result: 16th place

Intercontinental Cup
- Appearances: 1 (first in 2006)
- Best result: 8th place

Asian Games
- Appearances: 5 (first in 1998)
- Best result: 5th place (4 times, most recent in 2026)

Asian Championship
- Appearances: 28 (first in 1954)
- Best result: (gold) 1st (1 time, in 1954)

Philippines national baseball team
Medal record

Men's Baseball

Representing Philippines

Southeast Asian Games
Gold medal – first place	2025 Thailand	Team
Gold medal – first place	2019 Philippines	Team
Gold medal – first place	2011 Palembang	Team
Gold medal – first place	2005 Manila	Team
Silver medal – second place	2007 Nakhon Ratchasima	Team

The Philippines national baseball team, (Filipino: Pambansang koponan ng beysbol ng Pilipinas) also referred to as "The Dreamers", represents the Philippines in international matches and tournaments. It is organized by the Philippine Amateur Baseball Association.

They were the inaugural champions of the Asian Baseball Championships in 1954, but finished fourth in seven of the next eight editions of the biennial events.

Since their last fourth-place finish in 1973, the national team has struggled to compete against top level Asian national teams, such as those of Japan, Chinese Taipei, and South Korea.

At the Southeast Asian level, the Philippines are a four-time SEA Games gold medalist. (2005, 2011, 2019, 2025) The only time they ended as silver medalists was in the 2007 edition, where they lost to Thailand in the final.

== History ==
=== Early history ===
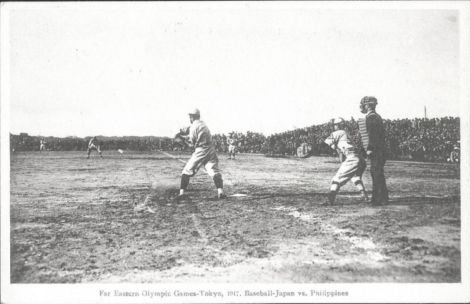
Match between Japan and the Philippines at the 1917 Far Eastern Games in Tokyo.

Baseball has a long history in the Philippines, with the sport's introduction in the islands dating back in September 1899. The Philippines, along with the Republic of China, and Japan frequently fielded teams in the baseball tournament of the Far Eastern Championship Games prior to World War II. The team from the 1920s to the 1930s was considered as a baseball power in Asia.

=== Post-World War II ===
At the sidelines of the 1954 Asian Games, the Philippines and other countries established in the Baseball Federation of Asia.

At the inaugural 1954 Asian Baseball Championship, the Philippines finished in first place. The team won 8–1 against Japan in the final and was led by head coach and manager Mariano Saberon.

The 1950s to the 1970s, the Philippines experienced a "golden age" in baseball. Until the 1971, the Philippines finished either third or fourth in seven of the eight Asian Baseball Championship editions held during that period. The tournaments were typically dominated by Japan, South Korea, and Taiwan (later competing as Chinese Taipei). The Philippines' last podium finish of this era was in 1971, when the team placed third.

=== 2000s ===
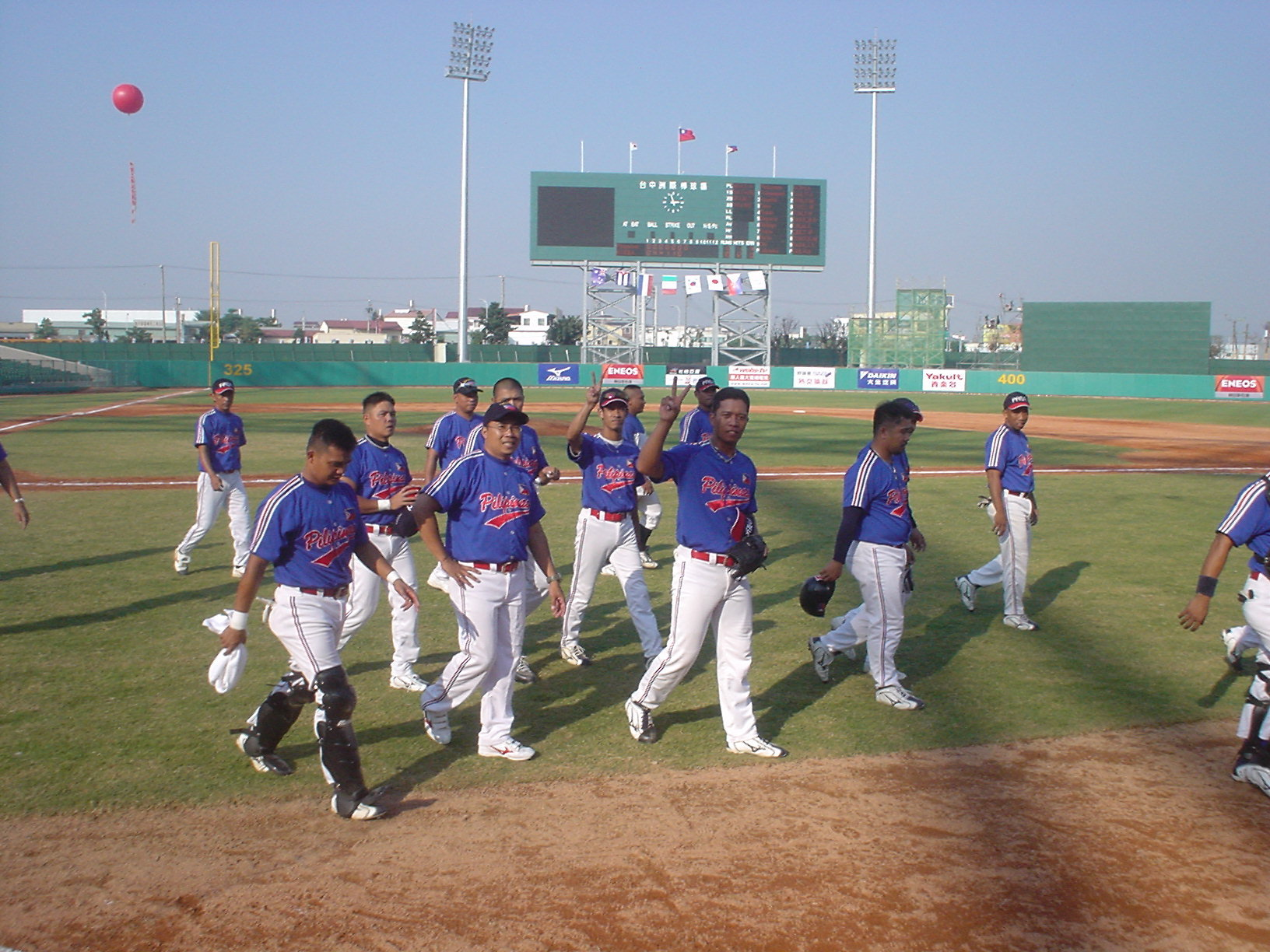
Philippine players walking off the field after their first ever game in the Intercontinental Cup in Taichung, Taiwan. They lost to South Korea 10–0.

The Philippines participated in the 2003 Asian Baseball Championship, which also served as a qualifier for the 2004 Summer Olympics, placing fifth. The national team won the inaugural baseball tournament at the 2005 SEA Games at home.

In November 2006, the Philippines competed in the Intercontinental Cup but failed to win a match in nine games; their best result was a 5–1 loss against South Korea in the seventh-place game. At the 2006 Asian Games, the team finished last in a field of six, though they performed competitively, scoring nine runs over five contests.

During the preliminary round of the 2007 Asian Baseball Championship, the Philippines remained undefeated, securing wins against Pakistan (2–0) and Hong Kong (4–1) before drawing with Thailand. Before the final round of the Asian Championship resumed, the Philippines attempted to defend their title at the 2007 SEA Games but suffered a close 5–4 defeat to Thailand, who emerged as champions. In the Asian Baseball Championship final round, the Philippines went winless against the "Big Three" Asian teams: Japan, South Korea, and Chinese Taipei.

Based on their performance at the 2007 Asian Baseball Championship, the team qualified for the "A" round of the subsequent tournament, where they faced Japan, Thailand, and Indonesia.

=== 2010s ===
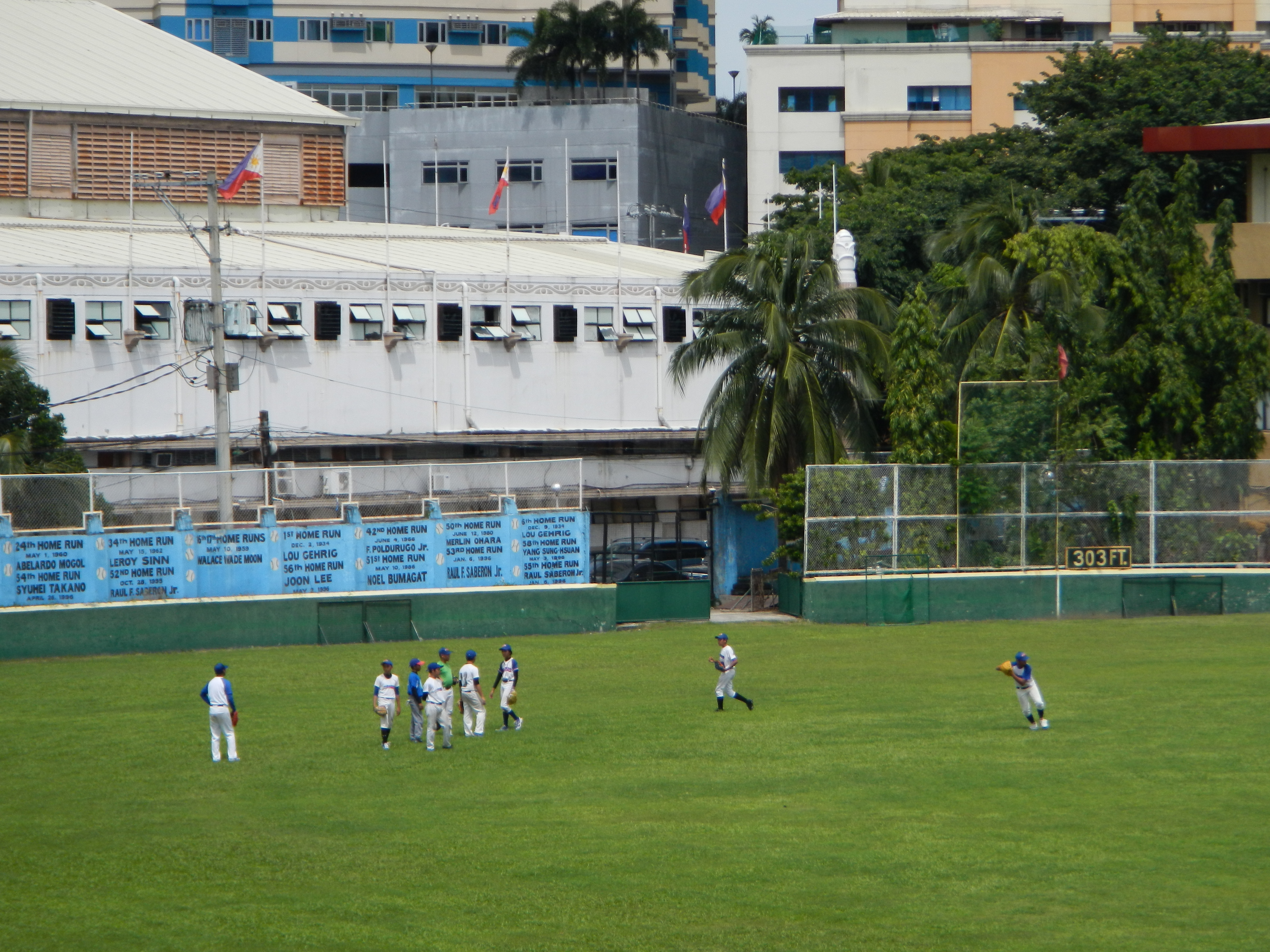
The Rizal Memorial Baseball Stadium in 2013

By 2010, the national team was inactive due to administrative and financial challenges within the Philippine Amateur Baseball Association (PABA), including internal leadership disputes. To address these issues, Philippine Olympic Committee (POC) president Peping Cojuangco appointed Marty Eizmendi to mediate the situation. Recognizing the team's historical potential, the POC urged PABA to assemble a squad for the 2011 Southeast Asian Games.

The two organizations cooperated to hold open tryouts—the first in decades—to select the national team members. The resulting team captured the gold medal at the 2011 SEA Games, defeating host Indonesia 3–1 in the final.

In 2012, the Philippines participated in the qualifiers for the 2013 World Baseball Classic but did not advance. Following the death of long-time PABA president Hector Navasero in late 2013, Marty Eizmendi was elected as the new president. The association continued to grapple with financial and management difficulties during this transition.

The team successfully defended its regional standing by winning the 2015 East Asia Cup in Jakarta with a 10–0 victory over Indonesia. This win qualified them for the 2015 Asian Baseball Championship; however, the team withdrew from the continental tournament citing financial constraints, allowing the runner-up Indonesia to participate instead.

In February 2016, the team competed in the 2017 World Baseball Classic qualifiers under American manager Tim Hulett. For the 2017 Asian Baseball Championship, the roster was primarily composed of collegiate players from SCUAA and UAAP, managed by Egay delos Reyes.

The team concluded the decade by retaining the gold medal at the 2019 Southeast Asian Games, continuing their reign after the sport's eight-year absence from the regional meet.

=== 2020s ===
Due to the COVID-19 pandemic, the Philippines national team did not compete in international tournaments from 2020 to 2022. The team returned to action in May 2023 by participating in the East Asia Baseball Cup. Under manager Orlando Binarao, the team swept the tournament and defeated Hong Kong 10–2 in the final to capture their fifth title in history.

This victory qualified the team for the 2025 Asian Baseball Championship held in Fuzhou, China, where they faced strong competition from Japan and China in the group stage. The team finished the tournament in sixth place overall.

In December 2025, the team competed in the 33rd Southeast Asian Games in Thailand. Now coached by Orlando Binarao, the Philippines swept the elimination round with a 6–0 record, highlighted by a 10-inning walk-off victory (8–7) against host Thailand and a shutout win over Laos. In the gold medal match, the team defeated Thailand again 5–3 to secure a perfect 7–0 tournament sweep, extending their reign as regional champions for a third consecutive contested edition.

Notable players during this period include pitcher Junmar Diarao, infielder Lord Aragorn de Vera, and outfielder Carlos Alberto Muñoz, who were key contributors to the team's resurgence.

== Medal count ==
Event	Editions	1st edition	Total				Notes
Event	Editions	1st edition	Gold medal	Silver medal	Bronze medal	Tot.	Notes
World Baseball Classic	0	—N/a	0	0	0	0	
World Cup	1	2001	0	0	0	0	
WBSC Premier12	0	—N/a	0	0	0	0	
Intercontinental Cup	1	2006	0	0	0	0	
Olympic Games	0	—N/a	0	0	0	0	
Asian Baseball Championship	27	1954	1	0	2	3	
Asian Baseball Cup	2	1995	2	0	0	2	
East Asian Baseball Cup	5	2012	5	0	0	5	
Asian Games	4	1998	0	0	0	0	
Far Eastern Games	10	1913	6	4	0	10	
Southeast Asian Games	5	2005	4	1	0	5	

== International tournament results ==
=== World Baseball Classic ===
World Baseball Classic record							Qualification record			
Year	Round	Position	W	L	RS	RA	W	L	RS	RA
2006	Did not enter						No qualifiers held			
2009	Did not enter						No qualifiers held			
2013	Did not qualify						1	2	14	28
2017	Did not qualify						0	2	8	28
2023	Did not enter						Did not enter			
2026	Did not enter						Did not enter			
Total	-	0/6	-	-	-	-	1	4	22	56

Philippines World Baseball Classic Qualifiers Record by opponent
Opponent	Tournaments met	W-L record	Largest victory		Largest defeat		Current streak
Opponent	Tournaments met	W-L record	Score	Tournament	Score	Tournament	Current streak
Australia	1	0-1	–		11–1 (F/7)	Australia 2017	L1
Chinese Taipei	1	0-1	–		16–0 (F/7)	Taiwan 2013	L1
New Zealand	2	0-2	–		16–7 (F/8)	Australia 2017	L2
Thailand	1	1-0	8–2	Taiwan 2013	–		W1
Overall	2	1–4	Against THA		Against TPE		L4
Overall	2	1–4	8–2	Taiwan 2013	16–0 (F/7)	Taiwan 2013	L4

=== Asian Championships ===
Champions Runners up Third place Fourth place

Asian Baseball Championship
Year	Round	Position	Pld	W	L	RS	RA
(Philippines) 1954	Round robin	Champions	-	-	-	-	-
(Philippines) 1955	Round robin	4th Place	-	-	-	-	-
(Japan) 1959	Round robin	4th Place	-	-	-	-	-
(Taiwan) 1962	Round robin	4th Place	-	-	-	-	-
(South Korea) 1963	Round robin	4th Place	-	-	-	-	-
(Philippines) 1965	Round robin	4th Place	-	-	-	-	-
(Japan) 1967	Round robin	4th Place	-	-	-	-	-
(Taiwan) 1969	Round robin	3rd Place	-	-	-	-	-
(South Korea) 1971	Round robin	3rd Place	-	-	-	-	-
(Philippines) 1973	Round robin	4th Place	-	-	-	-	-
(South Korea) 1975	Round robin	5th Place	-	-	-	-	-
(South Korea) 1983	Round robin	5th Place	-	-	-	-	-
(Australia) 1985	—N/a	Did not participate					
(Japan) 1987	—N/a	Did not participate					
(South Korea) 1989	Round robin	6th Place	-	-	-	-	-
(China) 1991	Round robin	5th Place	-	-	-	-	-
(Australia) 1993	Round robin	6th Place	-	-	-	-	-
(Japan) 1995	Round robin	5th Place	-	-	-	-	-
(Chinese Taipei) 1997	Round robin	5th Place	-	-	-	-	-
(South Korea) 1999	Round robin	5th Place	-	-	-	-	-
(Chinese Taipei) 2001	Round robin	4th Place	-	-	-	-	-
(Japan) 2003	Round robin	5th Place	-	-	-	-	-
(Japan) 2005	Round robin	5th Place	-	-	-	-	-
(Chinese Taipei) 2007	Round robin	4th Place	-	-	-	-	-
(Japan) 2009	Round robin	5th Place	-	-	-	-	-
(Chinese Taipei) 2012	Round robin	5th Place	-	-	-	-	-
(Chinese Taipei) 2015	—N/a	Withdrew					
(Chinese Taipei) 2017	Bronze Match	4th Place	7	2	5	23	75
(Chinese Taipei) 2019	Consolation	5th Place	5	4	1	31	13
(Chinese Taipei) 2023	Bronze Match	4th Place	6	2	4	22	32
(China) 2025	Placement	6th Place	5	2	3	24	34
Total	1 Title	Champion					

=== Asian Games ===
Champions Runners up Third place Fourth place

Asian Games Record
Year	Round	Position	Pld	W	L	RS	RA
(Japan) 1994	—N/a	Did not participate					
(Thailand) 1998	Preliminary	5th Place	4	1	3	28	39
(South Korea) 2002	Preliminary	5th Place	4	0	4	2	44
(Qatar) 2006	Round robin	6th Place	5	0	5	9	67
(China) 2010	—N/a	Did not participate					
(South Korea) 2014	—N/a	Did not participate					
(Indonesia) 2018	—N/a	Did not participate					
(China) 2022	Placement	5th Place	5	3	2	23	10
(Japan) 2026	Placement	5th Place	5	2	3	43	36
Total	0 Titles	5th Place					

=== Other tournaments ===
==== Asian Baseball Cup ====
Asia Baseball Cup
Year	Round	Position	Pld	W	L	RS	RA
(Philippines) 1995	-	Champions	-	-	-	-	-
(Thailand) 1997	-	7th Place	-	-	-	-	-
(India) 1999	-	Champions	-	-	-	-	-
(Indonesia) 2001	-	No Info					
(Thailand) 2002	-	No Info					
(Thailand) 2004	-	No Info					
(Pakistan) 2006	-	No Info					
(Thailand) 2009	-	Did not enter					
(Pakistan) 2010	-	Did not enter					
Eastern Division
(Thailand) 2012	-	Champions	-	-	-	-	-
(Indonesia) 2015	-	Champions	-	-	-	-	-
(Hong Kong) 2017	-	Champions	-	-	-	-	-
(Thailand) 2020	-	Cancelled					
(Thailand) 2023	-	Champions	7	7	0	86	8
(Philippines) 2024	-	Champions	5	5	0	65	10
Total	7 Titles	Champions					

==== SEA Games ====
SEA Games
Year	Round	Position	Pld	W	L	RS	RA
(Philippines) 2005	Finals	Champions	6	6	0	95	6
(Thailand) 2007	Round Robin	Runners up	5	4	1	56	6
(Indonesia) 2011	Finals	Champions	5	5	0	35	2
(Philippines) 2019	Finals	Champions	5	5	0	75	5
(Thailand) 2025	Finals	Champions	7	7	0	96	14
Total	4 Titles	Champions	28	27	1	357	33

==== Far Eastern Championships ====
Far Eastern Championship Games
Year	Round	Position	Pld	W	L	RS	RA
(Philippines) 1913	-	Runners up	No Info				
(China) 1915	-	Champions	No Info				
(Japan) 1917	-	Runners up	No Info				
(Philippines) 1919	-	Champions	No Info				
(China) 1921	-	Champions	No Info				
(Japan) 1923	-	Champions	No Info				
(Philippines) 1925	-	Champions	No Info				
(China) 1927	-	Runners up	No Info				
(Japan) 1930	-	Runners up	No Info				
(Philippines) 1934	-	Champions	No Info				
Total	6 Titles	Champions					

== Technical staff ==
=== Current technical staff ===
Position	Name
Manager	(Philippines) Orlando Binarao
First Base Coach	(Philippines) Ricardo Jiminez
Third Base Coach	(Philippines) Romar Landicho
Pitching Coach	(Philippines) Joseph Orillana

=== Managerial history ===
- (Philippines) Regino Ylanan (1921–1923)
- (Philippines) Juan Taduran (1930)
- (Philippines) Mariano Saberon (1954)
- (Philippines) Eladio Baradas (2001)
- (Philippines) Edgar "Egay" Delos Reyes (2005, 2007, 2011)
- (United States) Jim Ramos (2012)
- (United States) Tim Hulett (2016)
- (Philippines) Edgar "Egay" Delos Reyes (2017)
- (Philippines) Orlando Binarao (2019, 2022–2023)
- (Philippines) Vince Sagisi (2024)
- (Philippines) Orlando Binarao (2025–present)

== Current roster ==
Philippines roster – 2025 SEA Games
Players		Coaches
Pitchers: 8 Junmar Diarao; 10 Mar Joseph Carolino; 12 Kennedy Torres; 15 Clarence Lyle Caasalan; 17 Juan Paulo Macasaet; 20 Romeo Jasmin Jr.; 20 Amiel De Guzman; 40 Joshua Pineda; 78 James Vincent Nisnisan; 87 Francis Thomas Gonzaga	Catchers: 4 Samuel Renato Jr.; 13 John Reymond Vargas; 18 Mark Steven Manaig; 99 Kent Joerend Altarejos; Infielders: 1 Jennald Pareja; 23 Liam Alexei De Vera; 25 Cer Gio Gorpido; 27 John Leonel Matanguihan; 28 Mark John Philip Beronilla; 42 Razhley Santos; Outfielders: 33 Erwin Bosito; 33 Nigel Paule; 52 Joven Kenneth Maulit; 56 Ferdinand Liguayan Jr.	Manager (Philippines) Orlando Binarao; Coaches (Philippines) Ricardo Jimenez (first base) (Philippines) Romar Landicho (third base) (Philippines) Joseph Orillana (pitching) (Philippines) Michael Benedict Asuncion (Philippines) Armando De Castro

== See also ==
- Philippines women's national baseball team
