= 1954 Asian Baseball Championship =

Tournament details
- Country: Philippines
- Dates: December
- Teams: 4

Final positions
- Champions: Philippines (1st title)
- Runners-up: Japan
- Third place: South Korea
- Fourth place: Taiwan

The 1954 Asian Baseball Championship was the first continental tournament held by the Baseball Federation of Asia, from 18 to 26 December. The tournament was held in Manila, Philippines, and was won by the host nation. 17,000 people attended the final game at Rizal Stadium to see Philippines defeat Japan 8–1. As of 2019, it is the only time that the Philippines have won the tournament. South Korea (3rd) and Taiwan (4th) were the other participants.

== See also ==
- Japan–South Korea baseball rivalry

== Bibliography ==
- Bjarkman, Peter C. (2005). Diamonds Around the Globe: The Encyclopedia of International Baseball. Westport, CT United States: Greenwood Press. ISBN 0-313-32268-6. OCLC 58806121.
