= Philippine Amateur Baseball Association =

- Type: National Sports Association
- Headquarters: Century Park Hotel, Manila, Philippines
- Secretary General: Michael Asuncion
- President: Rodolfo Tingzon Jr.
- Website: philippinebaseball.org

The Philippine Amateur Baseball Association (PABA) is the national governing body for amateur baseball in the Philippines.

PABA was established in 1954, and is among the founding members of the Baseball Federation of Asia (BFA) which was established in May of the same year. PABA's inaugural president Charles Parsons was also the first president of BFA.

== Presidents ==
- Chick Parsons (1954–?)
- Totoy Tingzon
- Dominador Pangilinan (?–1986)
- Hector Navasero (1986–2013)
- Ely Baradas (2013; acting)
- Marty Eizmendi (2013–2018)
- Chito Loyzaga (2018–2025)
- Rodolfo Tingzon Jr. (2025–present)

== Competitions ==
- Philippine Baseball League (2019)

== National teams ==
- Men's national baseball team
- Women's national baseball team
- National Baseball5 team
