= Sports in Seoul =

Seoul is a major center for sports in South Korea. Its professional sports teams compete in football (soccer), baseball, basketball, volleyball.

== Overview ==
Seoul hosted the 1986 Asian Games, commonly known as Asiad, 1988 Olympic Games, and Paralympic Games. It also served as one of the host cities of the 2002 FIFA World Cup. Seoul World Cup Stadium hosted the opening ceremony and first game of the tournament.

Seoul has greatest number of professional sports teams and facilities in South Korea.

In the history of South Korean major professional sports league championships which include the K League, KBO League, KBL, V-League, Seoul had multiple championships in a season 2 times, 1990 K League 1 Lucky-Goldstar FC (currently FC Seoul) and KBO League LG Twins in 1990, K League 1 FC Seoul and KBO League Doosan Bears in 2016

== Sports teams in Seoul ==
=== Football ===
Seoul's most popular football club is FC Seoul. Recently, FC Seoul finished as a runner-up in 2013 AFC Champions League.

- Men's football

Tier	League	Club	Home stadium
Top	K League 1	FC Seoul	Seoul World Cup Stadium
2nd	K League 2	Seoul E-Land FC	Mokdong Stadium
5th	K3 League Basic	Seoul United	Madeul Stadium
5th	K3 League Basic	Jungnang Chorus Mustang	Jungnang Public Ground

- Women's football

Tier	League	Club	Home stadium
Top	WK League	Seoul WFC	Hyochang Stadium, Seoul Olympic Auxiliary Stadium

=== Baseball ===
League	Club	Home stadium
KBO League	Doosan Bears	Jamsil Baseball Stadium
KBO League	LG Twins	Jamsil Baseball Stadium
KBO League	Kiwoom Heroes	Gocheok Sky Dome

=== Basketball ===
- Seoul SK Knights and Seoul Samsung Thunders.

=== Volleyball ===
- Seoul Woori Card Wibee and GS Caltex Seoul KIXX

== Honours ==
=== Football ===
==== Domestic ====
- League Title

Club	Champions	Runners-up
FC Seoul	4 (1990, 2010, 2012, 2016)	2 (1993, 2008)
Ilhwa Chunma	3 (1993, 1994, 1995)	1 (1992)
Yukong Elephants	0	1 (1994)

- FA Cup

Club	Winners	Runners-up
FC Seoul	1 (2015)	2 (2014, 2016)

==== International ====
- AFC Champions League

Club	Winners	Runners-up
FC Seoul	0	1 (2013)

==== Women's Domestic ====
Club	Champions	Runners-up
Seoul WFC	0	1 (2013)

=== Baseball ===
==== Domestic ====
- League Title

Club	Champions	Runners-up
Doosan Bears	5 (1995, 2001, 2015, 2016, 2019)	6 (2000, 2005, 2007, 2008, 2013, 2020)
LG Twins	2 (1990, 1994)	4 (1983, 1997, 1998, 2002)
Kiwoom Heroes	0	2 (2014, 2019)

=== Basketball ===
==== Domestic ====
- League Title

Club	Champions	Runners-up
Seoul Samsung Thunders	1 (2006)	3 (2008, 2009, 2017)
Seoul SK Knights	1 (2018)	2 (2002, 2013)

=== Volleyball ===
==== Domestic ====
- League Title

Club	Champions	Runners-up
Seoul Woori Card Wibee		

==== Women's Domestic ====
- League Title

Club	Champions	Runners-up
GS Caltex Seoul KIXX	1 (2013–14)	

=== Multiple Champions ===
Season	Football Club		Baseball Club		Basketball Club	
1990	Lucky-Goldstar FC	K League 1	LG Twins	KBO League		
2006	FC Seoul	League Cup			Seoul Samsung Thunders	Korean Basketball League
2015	FC Seoul	FA Cup	Doosan Bears	KBO League		
2016	FC Seoul	K League 1	Doosan Bears	KBO League		
