= 2012 Korea Professional Baseball season =

2012 Paldo Pro Baseball
- League: Korea Professional Baseball
- Sport: Baseball
- Duration: April 2012 – November 2012
- Number of games: 133 per team
- Number of teams: 8

Regular Season
- Season champions: Samsung Lions
- Season MVP: Park Byung-ho (Nexen)

Post Season
- Semi-Playoff champions: Lotte Giants
- Semi-Playoff runners-up: Doosan Bears
- Playoff champions: SK Wyverns
- Playoff runners-up: Lotte Giants

Korean Series
- Champions: Samsung Lions
- Runners-up: SK Wyverns
- Finals MVP: Lee Seung-yuop (Samsung)

KBO seasons
- ← 2011 2013 →

The 2012 Korea Professional Baseball season was the 31st season in the history of the Korea Professional Baseball. The Samsung Lions won the regular season and Korean series.

== Season structure ==
=== Regular season ===
- Each team played 133 games during the regular season.

=== All-Star Game ===
On 21 July, the best players participate in the Korean All-Star Game. The franchises participating are divided into two regions: Eastern League (Samsung Lions, Doosan Bears, Lotte Giants, SK Wyverns) and Western League (Kia Tigers, Hanwha Eagles, LG Twins, Nexen Heroes). The titles 'Eastern' and 'Western' do not directly correspond to the geographical regions of the franchises involved, as both SK and Doosan, being from Incheon and Seoul respectively, are clearly based in the Western region of Korea, despite representing the East. Unlike in the MLB, the Korean All-Star Game does not determine home-field advantage in the Korean Series. The most recent Korean All-Star Game was played in Seoul. 2012 Korean All-Star Game won 5-2 by the Eastern League.

=== Postseason ===
Korea Professional Baseball season culminates in its championship series, known as the Korean Series. Currently, the top four teams qualify for the postseason based on win–loss records. The team with the best record gains a direct entry into the Korean Series, while the other three teams compete for the remaining place in a step-ladder playoff system:

- Semi-Playoff (best-of-five, added from 3 games starting from 2008)
  - Regular Season 3rd place vs. Regular Season 4th place
- Playoff (best-of-five, reduced from 7 games starting from 2009)
  - Regular Season 2nd place vs. Semi-Playoff Winner
- Korean Series (best-of-seven)
  - Regular Season 1st place vs. Playoff Winner

Any playoff games are no draw playing until the end, so originally scheduled 5 or 7 games.

=== To Determine the Final Standings ===
- Champion (1st place): Korean Series Winner
- Runner-up (2nd place): Korean Series Loser
- 3rd–8th place: Sort by Regular Season record except teams to play in the Korean Series.

== Standings ==
Rank	Team	GP	W	D	L	Pct.	Postseason
1	Samsung Lions	133	80	2	51	0.611	2012 Korean Series Champion
2	SK Wyverns	133	71	3	59	0.546	Playoff Winner, 2012 Korean Series Runner-up
3	Doosan Bears	133	68	3	62	0.523	Semi-Playoff Loser
4	Lotte Giants	133	65	6	62	0.512	Semi-Playoff Winner, Playoff Loser
5	Kia Tigers	133	62	6	65	0.488	Did not qualify
6	Nexen Heroes	133	61	3	69	0.469	Did not qualify
7	LG Twins	133	57	4	72	0.442	Did not qualify
8	Hanwha Eagles	133	53	3	77	0.408	Did not qualify

Regular Season Champion

Samsung Lions

== Postseason ==
=== Semi-Playoff ===
Lotte Giants won the series, 3–1.

Game	Date	Score	Location	Time	Attendance
1	8 October 2012	Lotte Giants 8–5 Doosan Bears (10th inning)	Jamsil Baseball Stadium, Seoul	-	-
2	9 October 2012	Lotte Giants 2–1 Doosan Bears	Jamsil Baseball Stadium, Seoul	-	-
3	11 October 2012	Doosan Bears 7–2 Lotte Giants	Sajik Baseball Stadium, Busan	-	-
4	12 October 2012	Doosan Bears 3–4 Lotte Giants (10th inning)	Sajik Baseball Stadium, Busan	-	-

=== Playoff ===
SK Wyverns won the series, 3–2.

Game	Date	Score	Location	Time	Attendance
1	16 October 2012	Lotte Giants 1–2 SK Wyverns	Munhak Baseball Stadium, Incheon	-	-
2	17 October 2012	Lotte Giants 5-4 SK Wyverns (10th inning)	Munhak Baseball Stadium, Incheon	-	-
3	19 October 2012	SK Wyverns 1–4 Lotte Giants	Sajik Baseball Stadium, Busan	-	-
4	20 October 2012	SK Wyverns 2-1 Lotte Giants	Sajik Baseball Stadium, Busan	-	-
5	22 October 2012	Lotte Giants 3–6 SK Wyverns	Munhak Baseball Stadium, Incheon	-	-

=== Korean Series ===
Samsung Lions won the series, 4–2.

Game	Date	Score	Location	Time	Attendance
1	24 October 2012	SK Wyverns 1-3 Samsung Lions	Daegu Baseball Stadium, Daegu	-	-
2	25 October 2012	SK Wyverns 3-8 Samsung Lions	Daegu Baseball Stadium, Daegu	-	-
3	28 October 2012	Samsung Lions 8–12 SK Wyverns	Munhak Baseball Stadium, Incheon	-	-
4	29 October 2012	Samsung Lions 1-4 SK Wyverns	Munhak Baseball Stadium, Incheon	-	-
5	31 October 2012	SK Wyverns 1-2 Samsung Lions	Jamsil Baseball Stadium, Seoul	-	-
6	1 November 2012	Samsung Lions 7–0 SK Wyverns	Jamsil Baseball Stadium, Seoul	-	-

2012 Korean Series Champion

Samsung Lions
(Sixth title)

== Foreign players ==
For the first time since 1997, there are no foreign hitters in the KBO, as all eight teams use their foreign player allotments on pitchers.
