= 2013 Korea Professional Baseball season =

2013 Korea Yakult 7even Baseball
- League: Korea Professional Baseball
- Sport: Baseball
- Duration: March 2013 – November 2013
- Number of games: 128 per team
- Number of teams: 9

Regular Season
- Season champions: Samsung Lions
- Season MVP: Park Byung-ho (Nexen)

Postseason
- Semi-Playoff champions: Doosan Bears
- Semi-Playoff runners-up: Nexen Heroes
- Playoff champions: Doosan Bears
- Playoff runners-up: LG Twins

Korean Series
- Champions: Samsung Lions
- Runners-up: Doosan Bears
- Finals MVP: Park Han-yi (Samsung)

KBO seasons
- ← 2012 2014 →

The 2013 Korea Professional Baseball season was the 32nd season in the history of the Korea Professional Baseball. The Samsung Lions won the regular season and Korean series.

== Season structure ==
=== Regular season ===
For the 2013 season, due to the admission of the NC Dinos as the KBO's ninth team, each team's schedule was reduced from 133 games to 128 games during the regular season with the new schedule arranging for each team to play every other team 16 times.

=== All-Star Game ===
On 19 July, the best players in the KBO participated in the Korean All-Star game at Pohang Baseball Stadium. The franchises participating were divided into two regions: Eastern League (Samsung Lions, Doosan Bears, Lotte Giants, SK Wyverns) and Western League (Kia Tigers, Hanwha Eagles, LG Twins, Nexen Heroes, NC Dinos). The titles 'Eastern' and 'Western' do not directly correspond to the geographical regions of the franchises involved, as both SK and Doosan, being from Incheon and Seoul respectively, are based in the Western region of Korea, despite representing the Eastern League. Unlike in Major League Baseball, the Korean All-Star Game does not determine home-field advantage in the Korean Series. The 2013 Korean All-Star Game was won by the Eastern League, 4–2.

=== Postseason ===
The 2013 Korea Professional Baseball season culminated in its championship series, known as the Korean Series. The top four teams qualified for the postseason based on their records. The team with the best record gained a direct berth into the Korean Series, while the other three teams competed for the remaining spot in the Korea Series in a step-ladder playoff system:

- Semi-playoff (best-of-five-game series, had been originally best-of-three-game-games, became best-of-five-game series in 2008)
  - Regular-season third-place team vs. regular-season fourth-place team
- Playoff (best-of-five-game-series, had been originally best-of-seven-game series, became best-of-five-game-series in 2009)
  - Regular-season second-place team vs. semi-playoff winner
- Korean Series (best-of-seven-game series)
  - Regular-season first-place-team vs. playoff winner

Unlike the regular season, no playoff game can result in a draw so each series can be completed as it was intended to be, whether it be a best-of-five-game or best-of-seven-games series.

=== To determine the final standings ===
- Champion (1st place): Korean Series winner
- Runner-up (2nd place): Korean Series loser
- 3rd–9th place: sort by regular-season record except teams to play in the Korean Series.

== Standings ==
Rank	Team	GP	W	D	L	Pct.	Postseason
1	Samsung Lions	128	75	2	51	0.595	2013 Korean Series Champion
2	LG Twins	128	74	0	54	0.578	Playoff Loser
3	Nexen Heroes	128	72	2	54	0.571	Semi-Playoff Loser
4	Doosan Bears	128	71	3	51	0.568	Semi-Playoff & Playoff Winner, 2013 Korean Series Runner-up
5	Lotte Giants	128	66	4	58	0.532	Did not qualify
6	SK Wyverns	128	62	3	63	0.496	Did not qualify
7	NC Dinos	128	52	4	72	0.419	Did not qualify
8	Kia Tigers	128	51	3	74	0.408	Did not qualify
9	Hanwha Eagles	128	42	1	85	0.331	Did not qualify

Regular Season Champion

Samsung Lions

== Postseason ==
=== Semi-playoff ===
Doosan Bears won the series, 3–2.

Game	Date	Score	Location	Time	Attendance
1	8 October 2013	Doosan Bears 3–4 Nexen Heroes	Mokdong Baseball Stadium, Seoul	-	-
2	9 October 2013	Doosan Bears 2–3 Nexen Heroes (10th inning)	Mokdong Baseball Stadium, Seoul	-	-
3	11 October 2013	Nexen Heroes 3–4 Doosan Bears (14th inning)	Jamsil Baseball Stadium, Seoul	-	-
4	12 October 2013	Nexen Heroes 1–2 Doosan Bears	Jamsil Baseball Stadium, Seoul	-	-
5	14 October 2013	Doosan Bears 8–5 Nexen Heroes (13th inning)	Mokdong Baseball Stadium, Seoul	-	-

=== Playoff ===
Doosan Bears won the series, 3–1.

Game	Date	Score	Location	Time	Attendance
1	16 October 2013	Doosan Bears 4–2 LG Twins	Jamsil Baseball Stadium, Seoul	-	-
2	17 October 2013	Doosan Bears 0–2 LG Twins	Jamsil Baseball Stadium, Seoul	-	-
3	19 October 2013	LG Twins 4–5 Doosan Bears	Jamsil Baseball Stadium, Seoul	-	-
4	20 October 2013	LG Twins 1–5 Doosan Bears	Jamsil Baseball Stadium, Seoul	-	-

=== Korean Series ===
Samsung Lions won the series, 4–3.

Game	Date	Score	Location	Time	Attendance
1	24 October 2013	Doosan Bears 7–2 Samsung Lions	Daegu Baseball Stadium, Daegu	-	-
2	25 October 2013	Doosan Bears 5–1 Samsung Lions (13th inning)	Daegu Baseball Stadium, Daegu	-	-
3	27 October 2013	Samsung Lions 3–2 Doosan Bears	Jamsil Baseball Stadium, Seoul	-	-
4	28 October 2013	Samsung Lions 1–2 Doosan Bears	Jamsil Baseball Stadium, Seoul	-	-
5	29 October 2013	Samsung Lions 7–5 Doosan Bears	Jamsil Baseball Stadium, Seoul	-	-
6	31 October 2013	Doosan Bears 2–6 Samsung Lions	Daegu Baseball Stadium, Daegu	-	-
7	1 November 2013	Doosan Bears 3–7 Samsung Lions	Daegu Baseball Stadium, Daegu	-	-

2013 Korean Series Champion

Samsung Lions
(Seventh title)

== Foreign players ==
For the second straight year, there are no foreign hitters in the KBO, as all nine teams use their foreign player allotments on pitchers.
