= Rick van den Hurk =

Dutch baseball player (born 1985)

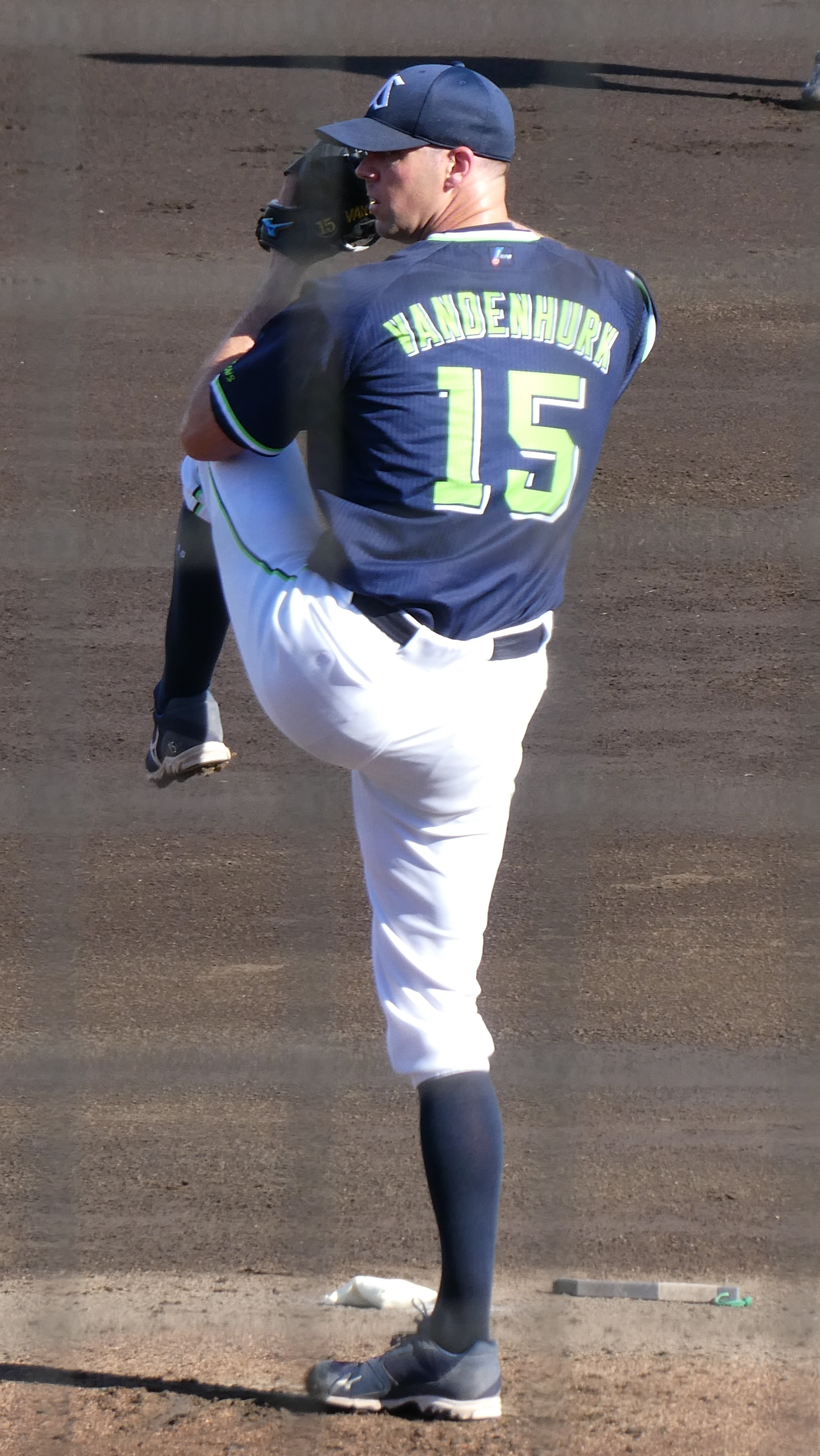
- van den Hurk with the Tokyo Yakult Swallows
- Pitcher
- Born: May 22, 1985 (age 41); Eindhoven, Netherlands
- Batted: Right Threw: Right

Professional debut
- MLB: April 10, 2007, for the Florida Marlins
- KBO: April 17, 2013, for the Samsung Lions
- NPB: June 14, 2015, for the Fukuoka SoftBank Hawks

Last appearance
- MLB: October 3, 2012, for the Pittsburgh Pirates
- KBO: October 14, 2014, for the Samsung Lions
- NPB: May 28, 2021, for the Tokyo Yakult Swallows

MLB statistics
- Win–loss record: 8–11
- Earned run average: 6.08
- Strikeouts: 179

KBO statistics
- Win–loss record: 20–13
- Earned run average: 3.55
- Strikeouts: 317

NPB statistics
- Win–loss record: 43–20
- Earned run average: 3.78
- Strikeouts: 547
- Stats at Baseball Reference

Teams
- Florida Marlins (2007–2010); Baltimore Orioles (2010–2011); Pittsburgh Pirates (2012); Samsung Lions (2013–2014); Fukuoka SoftBank Hawks (2015–2020); Tokyo Yakult Swallows (2021)

Career highlights and awards
- 2× Korean Series champion (2013, 2014); 5× Japan Series champion (2015, 2017–2020); KBO ERA leader (2014); KBO Strikeout leader (2014)

Henricus "Rick" Nicolas van den Hurk (Eindhoven, May 22, 1985) is a Dutch former professional baseball pitcher. He pitched in Major League Baseball (MLB) for the Florida Marlins, Baltimore Orioles, and Pittsburgh Pirates, in the KBO League for the Samsung Lions, and in Nippon Professional Baseball (NPB) for the Fukuoka SoftBank Hawks and Tokyo Yakult Swallows. He pitched for the Netherlands national team in international tournaments.

== Early life ==
Henricus "Rick" Nicolas van den Hurk was born on May 22, 1985, in Eindhoven, Netherlands. At the age of 16, van den Hurk was scouted by Chicho Jesurun when he was playing for the Twins Oosterhout baseball team, where his father was a coach. He went to Fort Lauderdale Preparatory School, where he excelled in baseball and graduated in 2003.

== Professional career ==
=== Draft and minor leagues ===
van den Hurk was signed by the Florida Marlins as an international free agent in 2002. He made his professional debut with the Rookie league GCL Marlins in 2003, pitching to a 2–6 record and 5.35 ERA in 11 games. In 2004, Van den Hurk had a 2–3 record and 3.26 ERA in 14 games for the High-A Jupiter Hammerheads. He underwent Tommy John surgery in 2005 and pitched to a 2.83 ERA in 6 games between Jupiter and the Single-A Greensboro Grasshoppers. In 2006, van den Hurk started five games for the GCL Marlins and three more games for the Jupiter Hammerheads. Combined, he had a 1.80 ERA over 25 innings in 8 games for the two teams in 2006. Prior to his major league debut in 2007, he had never pitched above Class-A.

=== Florida Marlins (2007–2010) ===
On April 9, 2007, van den Hurk was promoted to the Marlins from the Double-A Carolina Mudcats when pitcher Ricky Nolasco was placed on the disabled list. At the time of his debut, he was the youngest player in the National League. He made his first major league appearance on April 10, starting against the Milwaukee Brewers. A rain delay cut his debut short after 4 2/3 innings, in which he allowed one earned run on five hits, with five strikeouts and three walks.

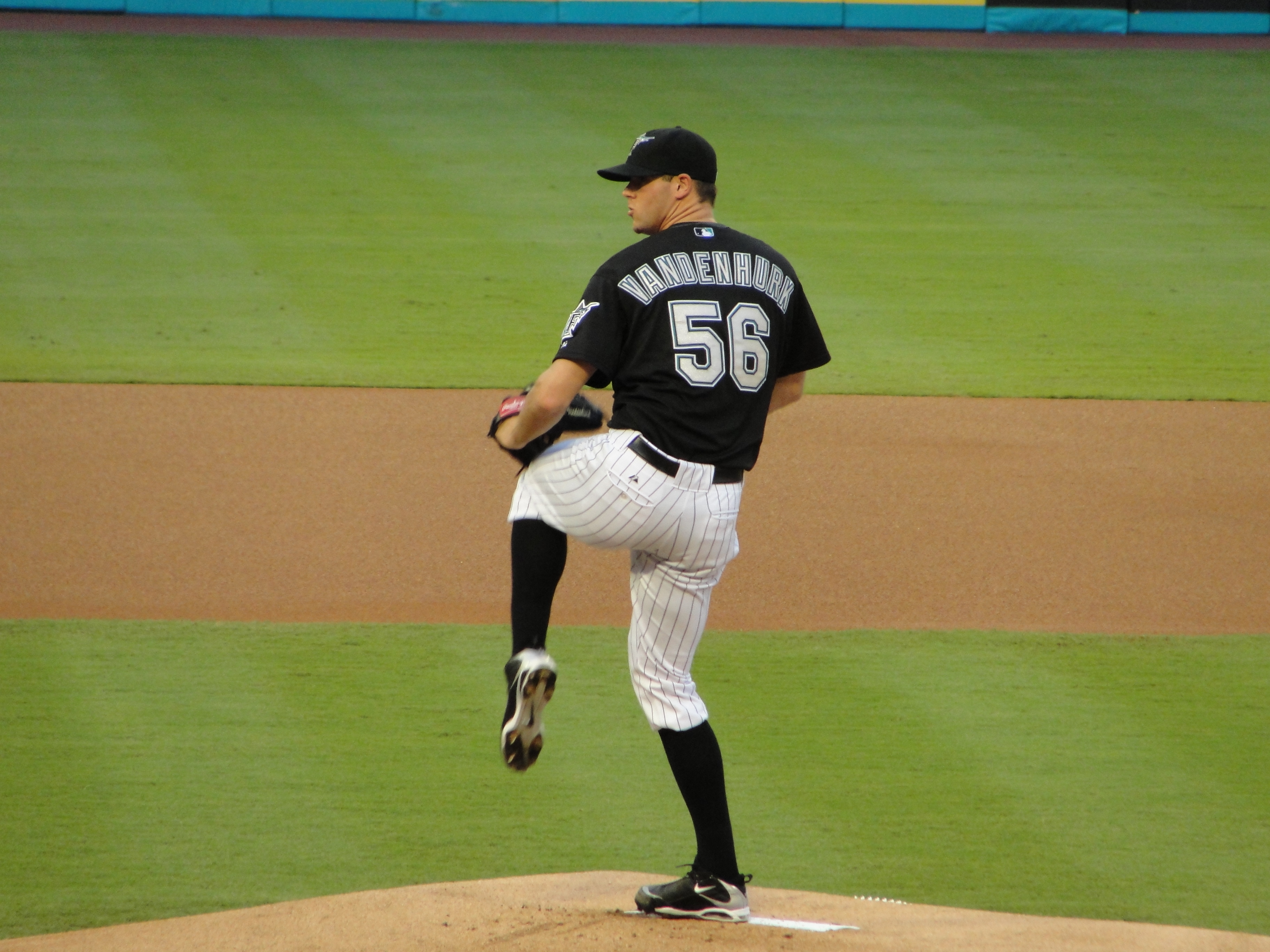
Van den Hurk with the Marlins in 2009

van den Hurk was sent back to Double-A after the team's April 24 loss to the Atlanta Braves. In his fourth appearance, he pitched just one inning while giving up six earned runs on four hits and four walks. Pitcher Nate Field was called up from Triple-A Albuquerque to take his roster spot.

On June 5, the Marlins called up van den Hurk to throw the second game of a doubleheader. He went six innings without giving up a hit until Yunel Escobar hit a double to lead off the 7th inning. He did not give up a run and earned his first win. He was sent again to Double-A on June 16.

In 2007, van den Hurk was selected to the All-Star Futures Game, for which he received the win after pitching a scoreless first inning. He finished his rookie season with a 4–6 record and 6.83 ERA in 18 major league appearances. He began the 2008 season with the Carolina Mudcats and was later promoted to the Triple-A Albuquerque Isotopes. On July 22, 2008, he was recalled to the majors on to start against the Atlanta Braves. He finished the 2008 season with a 7.71 ERA with 20 strikeouts in 14.0 innings pitched for the Marlins. He was assigned to the Triple-A New Orleans Zephyrs to begin the 2009 season. He was brought up again to join the rotation on July 20, 2009 when the Marlins sent struggling left-hander Andrew Miller to the minor leagues. His first opponent was the San Diego Padres, with van den Hurk coming away the winner that day in a 3–2 game. He finished the 2009 season with a 3–2 record and 4.30 ERA in 11 appearances with the Marlins.

During November 2009, van den Hurk pitched for Gigantes de Carolina of the Puerto Rico Baseball League, a baseball winter league. Van den Hurk made three starts going 0–0 with an ERA of 2.50 striking out 13 in 18 innings, while issuing just one walk. He began the 2010 season with Triple-A New Orleans, and also made 2 appearances for the Marlins, surrendering 4 runs in 1.1 innings.

=== Baltimore Orioles (2010–2011) ===
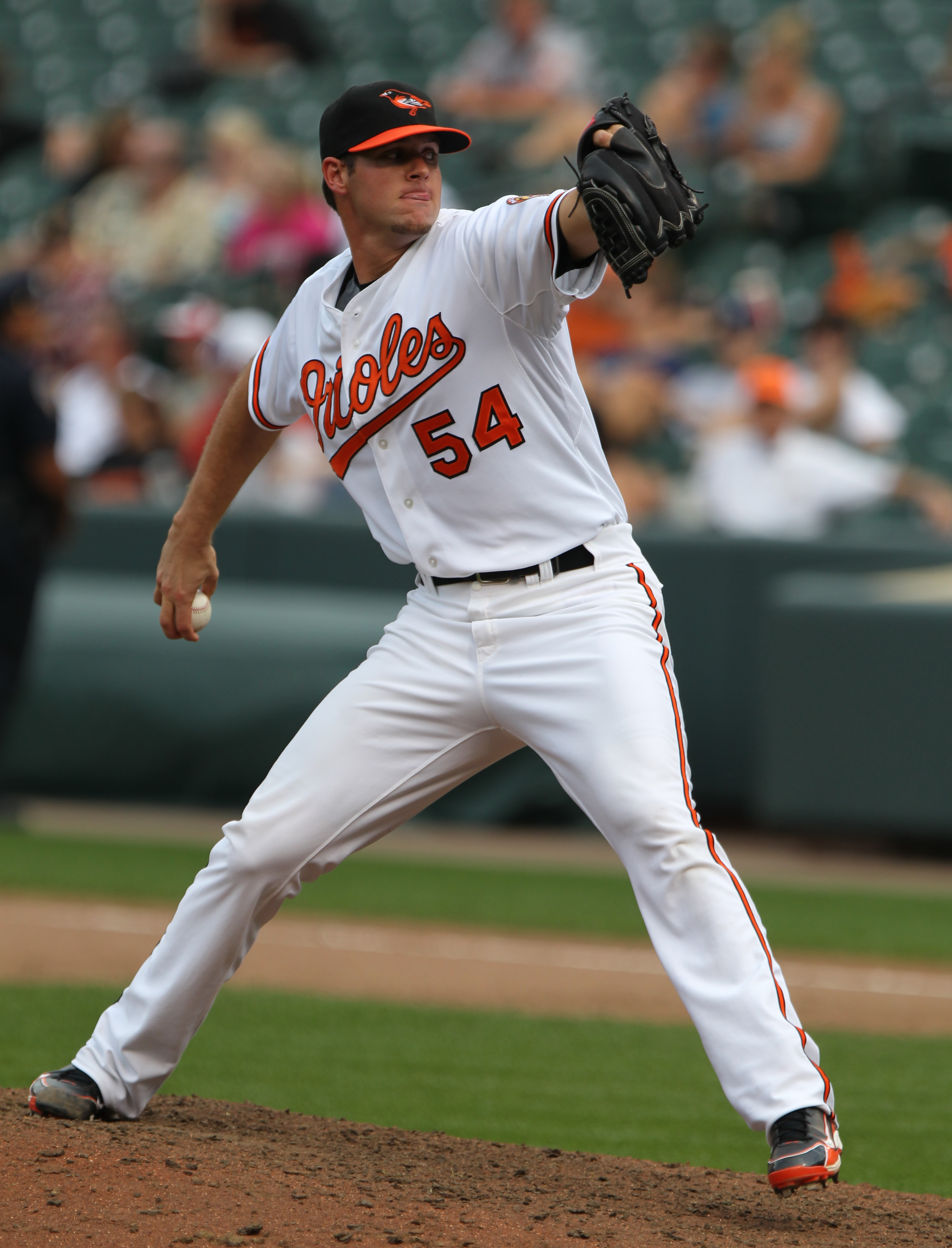
Van den Hurk with the Baltimore Orioles in 2011

On July 31, 2010, van den Hurk was traded to the Baltimore Orioles in exchange for Will Ohman. He was assigned to the Triple-A Norfolk Tides. On August 16, van den Hurk was recalled to the major leagues, and logged a 4.96 ERA in 7 appearances for Baltimore. On March 28, 2011, van den Hurk was outrighted off of the 40-man roster. He was assigned to Norfolk to begin the year, and pitched to a 9–13 record and 4.43 in 26 games. On September 1, van den Hurk was selected to the active roster, and pitched in 4 games, struggling to an 8.00 ERA. On January 24, 2012, van den Hurk was designated for assignment by Baltimore. On February 3, 2012, he was released by the Orioles organization.

=== Cleveland Indians ===
On February 22, 2012 the Toronto Blue Jays signed van den Hurk to a non-guaranteed contract.

van den Hurk was claimed off waivers by the Cleveland Indians on March 21, 2012, but was designated for assignment by the team on March 29. van den Hurk was subsequently outrighted on April 4, 2012, but declined his minor league assignment and elected free agency two days later.

=== Pittsburgh Pirates (2012) ===
On April 11, 2012, van den Hurk signed a minor league contract with the Pittsburgh Pirates. He was assigned to the Triple-A Indianapolis Indians, and also appeared in 1 game for the High-A Bradenton Marauders, recording a 14–5 record and 3.06 ERA in 22 appearances. van den Hurk was promoted to the Pirates on September 10. He appeared in 4 games for the Pirates, pitching to an 0–1 record in 2 2/3 innings. He was released on January 4, 2013 so he could pursue an opportunity in South Korea.

=== Samsung Lions (2013–2014) ===
On January 8, 2013, van den Hurk signed with the Samsung Lions of the Korea Baseball Organization for 2013. On April 17, 2013, Van den Hurk made his KBO debut. In his first KBO season, he logged a 7–9 record and 3.95 ERA with 137 strikeouts in 143.2 innings pitched, and also won the Korean Series with Samsung. In 2014, Van den Hurk finished with a 13–4 win–loss record, a 3.18 ERA (the lowest ERA in KBO), and a league-high 180 strikeouts over 152 2/3 innings pitched. He won the Korean Series for the second consecutive year with Samsung and became a free agent after the season.

=== Fukuoka SoftBank Hawks (2015–2020) ===
On December 26, 2014, van den Hurk signed a contract with the Fukuoka SoftBank Hawks of Nippon Professional Baseball (NPB). On June 14, 2015, van den Hurk made his NPB debut. In 2015, he made 15 starts for the SoftBank Hawks, compiling a perfect 9–0 record, with a 2.52 ERA and a 0.97 WHIP. He struck out 120 batters in 93 innings pitched. van den Hurk pitched 8 shutout innings in Game 2 of the Japan Series, which his team went on to win.

In 2016, in his second season with the Hawks, van den Hurk recorded his 14th consecutive win for the Hawks. This was the longest pitcher winning streak in NPB in 50 years. He finished 2016 with a 7–3 record in 13 starts, with a 3.84 ERA and a 0.96 WHIP. He struck out 92 batters in 82 innings pitched.

On January 4, 2017, he was selected as the Netherlands national baseball team in the 2017 World Baseball Classic. He was 1-0 in three starts with an 8.00 ERA in 9 innings. In the NPB in 2017, van den Hurk played in 25 games with a record of 13–7 with an ERA of 3.24 striking out 162 in 153 innings pitched.

In 2018, he finished the regular season with a 10–7 record, a 4.30 ERA, a 127 strikeouts in 138 innings. In the 2019 season, van den Hurk finished the regular season with a 2–0 record, pitching in only three games. On November 29, 2019, van den Hurk signed a 1-year extension to remain with the Hawks. In 2020, van den Hurk pitched to a 2–2 record and 6.92 ERA in 5 appearances for the Hawks. On December 2, 2020, he became a free agent.

=== Tokyo Yakult Swallows (2021) ===
On February 24, 2021, van den Hurk signed with Tokyo Yakult Swallows of NPB. He pitched in just two games for the Swallows, posting an unsightly 15.43 ERA in 4.2 innings. He also earned his first NPB base hit on May 21. van den Hurk was released by the Swallows on September 22, 2021.

On April 22, 2022, van den Hurk announced his retirement from professional baseball.

== Post-playing career ==
On May 14, 2022, van den Hurk was named the technical director of the Royal Netherlands Baseball and Softball Federation. He stepped down from that role at the end of September 2022.
