= Kim Kyung-moon =

South Korean baseball player

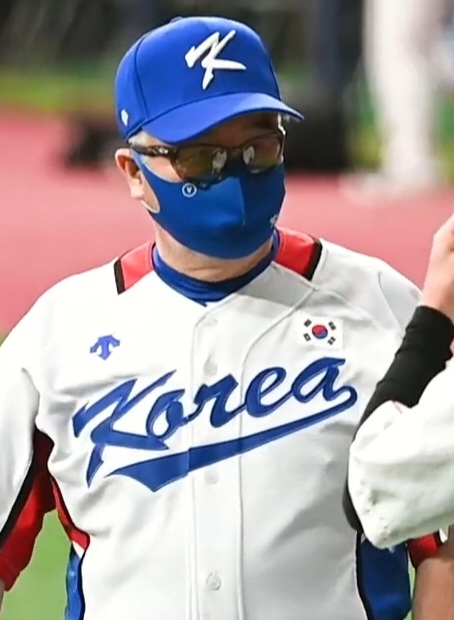
- Manager
- Born: November 1, 1958 (age 68)
- Batted: Right Threw: Right

KBO debut
- March 28, 1982, for the OB Bears

Last appearance
- September 29, 1991, for the OB Bears

KBO statistics
- Batting average: .220
- Home runs: 6
- Runs batted in: 126
- Stats at Baseball Reference

Teams
- As player: OB Bears (1982–1989); Pacific Dolphins (1990); OB Bears (1991); As coach: Samsung Lions (1994–1996); Doosan Bears (1998–2003); As manager: Doosan Bears (2004–2011); NC Dinos (2011–2018); Hanwha Eagles (2024–2026)

Career highlights and awards
- As manager: Olympic champion: 2008

- Kim Kyung-moon
- Hangul: 김경문
- Hanja: 金卿文
- RR: Gim Gyeongmun
- MR: Kim Kyŏngmun

Kim Kyung-moon (Korean: 김경문; Hanja: 金卿文; born November 1, 1958) is the manager of the Hanwha Eagles, and a former catcher in the Korea Baseball Organization.

== Playing career ==
Kim, a former catcher who threw and batted right-handed, attended Korea University in Seoul, South Korea. After graduation, he was signed by the OB Bears, which later became Doosan, and directly took the starting catcher position on the team as a rookie in Korean professional baseball's first year in 1982. Kim eventually led his team to the first Korean Series Championship in the KBO history, along with his battery mate Park Chul-soon who won 22 consecutive games in the regular season.

In his 10-year major league career in KBO, Kim batted .220 with 6 home runs, 126 runs batted in, 119 runs, 329 hits, 60 doubles, 1 triple, and 17 stolen bases in 700 games. Kim was not a very good hitter, batting around the Mendoza Line during his ten seasons, but is considered one of the best defensive catchers of all time.

== Managing career ==
After retirement as a player in 1991, Kim went to Atlanta to study coaching under Bobby Cox in the Atlanta Braves until 1994 when he was hired as a coach for the Samsung Lions. He was bullpen coach for the 1994 Samsung Lions and remained there until the 1996 season. In 1998, Kim returned to the Bears and worked as bullpen and bench coach until the 2003 season.

On October 10, 2003, Kim was named manager of the Bears, replacing Kim In-sik, who had won two Korean Series titles with the Bears. He led the Bears to their two-year consecutive postseason appearance (2004 and 2005).

On October 30, 2005, the Doosan Bears extended Kim's contract by three years, through 2008. In the 2006 season, Kim failed to make the 3rd consecutive postseason appearance for the Bears, but in the 2007 season, he led his team to the Korean Series once again.

After the 2007 season Kim was named the manager of for the South Korea national baseball team, and in August he participated in the 2008 Olympic Games held in Beijing, China. There Kim led the South Koreans to the gold medal, beating heavily favored Cuba, which had won the gold medals at the three previous Olympics.

On June 13, 2011, Kim was fired as manager of the Bears.

On August 31, 2011, Kim was named the first manager of the NC Dinos. He served as the Dinos' manager for about eight years, making the NC Dinos into a strong team. He continued his successful career for four consecutive years from 2014, including advancing his team to the postseason each season.

In 2017 Kim was diagnosed with a benign tumor in his pituitary gland. He didn't need surgery but was unable to manage the Dinos for five days.

In 2018 the Dinos finished in last place, and Kim stepped down as the team's manager.
