= Jamsil Stadium =

Jamsil Stadium may refer to a few stadiums in South Korea:

- Jamsil Arena, Jamsil-dong
- Jamsil Baseball Stadium, Jamsil-dong
- Jamsil Olympic Stadium, Seoul

== See also ==
- Jamsil (disambiguation)
