= 2014 Korea Professional Baseball season =

2014 Korea Yakult 7even Pro Baseball
- League: Korea Professional Baseball
- Sport: Baseball
- Duration: 29 March – 17 October
- Number of games: 128 per team
- Number of teams: 9

Regular Season
- Season champions: Samsung Lions
- Season MVP: Seo Geon-chang (Nexen)

Post Season
- Semi-Playoff champions: LG Twins
- Semi-Playoff runners-up: NC Dinos
- Playoff champions: Nexen Heroes
- Playoff runners-up: LG Twins

Korean Series
- Champions: Samsung Lions
- Runners-up: Nexen Heroes
- Finals MVP: Yamaico Navarro

KBO seasons
- ← 2013 2015 →

The 2014 Korea Professional Baseball season is 33rd season in the history of the Korea Professional Baseball.

== Season Structure ==
=== Regular season ===
Starting in season 2013, each team plays 128 games in the regular season, reduced from 133 due to expansion to nine teams. Each team plays every other 16 times.

There will be a third change in four seasons to the tie rule in South Korean professional baseball. In South Korean baseball, ties are called after 12 innings in the regular season and 15 innings in the playoffs. In 2008, the league briefly scrapped ties and forced teams to play until a winner was decided. But managers strongly opposed the change. The KBO went back to the 12-inning tie rule starting in 2009.

=== Video Replay ===
Responding to growing calls to address issues in refereeing, presidents of the teams in the country's top baseball league have agreed to expand video replay starting in the second half of the season, officials said on 8 July. Currently, the KBO umpires rely on video replay for disputed home run calls only. The instant replay coverage on home runs was introduced in 2009. Under the present KBO rules, umpires' decisions on safe-out and fair-foul calls are final and managers or coaches may not protest those calls. The league's umpires, though, have been on the hot seat for most of this season with some high-profile missed calls. With every KBO game broadcast live on cable television and available for free streaming online for domestic viewers, and with improved technology breaking down disputed plays from multiple angles, umpires also work under heavier scrutiny than in the past.

Before this season, the KBO brass had said the league would conduct feasibility studies on expanded video review and that it would consider making the move by as early as 2015. At their meeting in May, the league's general managers discussed expanding video replay but decided to put the issue on hold until the end of this season, citing technical difficulties.

With the pressure mounting to make changes, though, the KBO team presidents caved in and agreed to expand the replay in the second half, which begins on 22 July following the All-Star break. The KBO said it will convene its rules committee to revise the rule book, and settle on specifics of the expansion in a meeting of field managers ahead of the All-Star Game on 18 July. Before this season, Major League Baseball (MLB) decided to expand its review process to cover fair-foul calls and force play at bases, among other categories.

=== All-Star Game ===
On 18 July, the best players participated in the Korean All-Star Game. The franchises participating were divided into two regions: Eastern League Team (Samsung Lions, Doosan Bears, Lotte Giants, SK Wyverns) and Western League Team (Kia Tigers, Hanwha Eagles, LG Twins, Nexen Heroes, NC Dinos). The titles 'Eastern' and 'Western' do not directly correspond to the geographical regions of the franchises involved, as both SK and Doosan, being from Incheon and Seoul respectively, are based in the Western region of Korea, despite representing the East. Unlike in Major League Baseball, the Korean All-Star Game does not determine home-field advantage in the Korean Series. The game was played at Gwangju-Kia Champions Field and won 13-2 by Western League Team on 18 July 2014.

=== Postseason ===
Korea Professional Baseball season culminates in its championship series, known as the Korean Series. Currently, the top four teams qualify for the postseason based on win–loss records. The team with the best record gains a direct entry into the Korean Series, while the other three teams compete for the remaining place in a step-ladder playoff system:

- Semi-playoff (best-of-five, added from 3 games starting from 2008)
  - Regular-season 3rd place vs. regular-season 4th place
- Playoff (best-of-five, reduced from 7 games starting from 2009)
  - Regular-season 2nd place vs. semi-playoff winner
- Korean Series (best-of-seven)
  - Regular-season 1st place vs. playoff winner

=== To determine the final standings ===
- Champion (1st place): Korean Series winner
- Runner-up (2nd place): Korean Series loser
- 3rd–9th place: Sort by regular-season record except teams to play in the Korean Series.

== Standings ==
Rank	Team	GP	W	D	L	Pct.	Postseason
1	Samsung Lions	128	79	3	47	0.624	2014 Korean Series
2	Nexen Heroes	128	78	2	48	0.619	Playoff
3	NC Dinos	128	70	1	57	0.551	Semi-Playoff
4	LG Twins	128	62	2	64	0.492	Semi-Playoff
5	SK Wyverns	128	61	2	65	0.484	Did not qualify
6	Doosan Bears	128	59	1	68	0.465	Did not qualify
7	Lotte Giants	128	58	1	69	0.457	Did not qualify
8	Kia Tigers	128	54	0	74	0.422	Did not qualify
9	Hanwha Eagles	128	49	2	77	0.389	Did not qualify

== Postseason ==
Semi-playoff
3	NC Dinos	1
4	LG Twins	3

Playoff
2	Nexen Heroes	3
4	LG Twins	1

Korean Series
1	Samsung Lions	4
2	Nexen Heroes	2

=== Semi-playoff ===
LG won the series, 3-1.

Game	Date	Score	Location	Time	Attendance
1	19 October	LG Twins 13–4 NC Dinos	Masan Baseball Stadium, Changwon	14:00	13,000
2	22 October^	LG Twins 4–2 NC Dinos	Masan Baseball Stadium, Changwon	18:30	8,094
3	24 October	NC Dinos 4-3 LG Twins	Jamsil Baseball Stadium, Seoul	18:30	25,000
4	25 October	NC Dinos 3-11 LG Twins	Jamsil Baseball Stadium, Seoul	14:00	23,728

^: postponed from 20 October due to rain

=== Playoff ===
Nexen won the series, 3-1.

Game	Date	Score	Location	Time	Attendance
1	27 October	LG Twins 3-6 Nexen Heroes	Mokdong Baseball Stadium, Seoul	18:30	10,500
2	28 October	LG Twins 9-2 Nexen Heroes	Mokdong Baseball Stadium, Seoul	18:30	10,500
3	30 October	Nexen Heroes 6-2 LG Twins	Jamsil Baseball Stadium, Seoul	18:30	25,500
4	31 October	Nexen Heroes 12-2 LG Twins	Jamsil Baseball Stadium, Seoul	18:30	24,330

=== Korean Series ===
Samsung Lions won the series, 4-2.

Game	Date	Score	Location	Time	Attendance
1	4 November	Nexen Heroes 4-2 Samsung Lions	Daegu Baseball Stadium, Daegu	18:30	-
2	5 November	Nexen Heroes 1-7 Samsung Lions	Daegu Baseball Stadium, Daegu	18:30	-
3	7 November	Samsung Lions 3-1 Nexen Heroes	Mokdong Baseball Stadium, Seoul	18:30	-
4	8 November	Samsung Lions 3-9 Nexen Heroes	Mokdong Baseball Stadium, Seoul	14:00	-
5	10 November	Nexen Heroes 1-2 Samsung Lions	Jamsil Baseball Stadium, Seoul	18:30	-
6	11 November	Samsung Lions 11-1 Nexen Heroes	Jamsil Baseball Stadium, Seoul	18:30	-

2014 Korean Series Champion

Samsung Lions
(Eight title)

== Foreign hitters ==
Each team could have signed up to three foreign players. Due to the high proportion of pitchers signed in previous years, and there being no foreign hitters at all in 2012–2013, beginning in 2014 the league mandated that at least one of the foreign players must be a position player.

Team	Player	Position	In KBO since	Batting Average	Home runs	RBI	Notes
Doosan Bears	Jorge Cantú	IB	2014	.309	18	72	
Hanwha Eagles	Félix Pie	OF	2014	.326	17	92	
Kia Tigers	Brett Pill	1B	2014	.309	19	66	
LG Twins	Josh Bell	3B	2014	.267	10	39	
Lotte Giants	Luis Jiménez	1B	2014	.315	14	61	
NC Dinos	Eric Thames	1B	2014	.343	37	121	
Nexen Heroes	Vinny Rottino	OF/C	2014	.306	2	22	
Samsung Lions	Yamaico Navarro	2B	2014	.308	31	98	Korean Series Most Valuable Player Award
SK Wyverns	Luke Scott	OF	2014	.267	6	17	

== Average home attendances ==
1. LG Twins 18,241
2. Doosan Bears 17,630
3. SK Wyverns 12,965
4. Lotte Giants 12,962
5. KIA Tigers 10,366
6. Samsung Lions 7,891
7. Hanwha Eagles 7,424
8. NC Dinos 7,297
9. Nexen Heroes 6,921
