= Jo Hyun-woo (baseball) =

Korean baseball player

KT Wiz – No. 59
- Pitcher
- Born: March 30, 1994 (age 32); Gunsan, South Korea
- Bats: Left Throws: Left

KBO debut
- June 12, 2015, for the Lotte Giants

Career statistics (through April 5, 2022)
- Win–loss record: 5–1
- Earned run average: 3.22
- Strikeouts: 59
- Stats at Baseball Reference

Teams
- Lotte Giants (2015); KT Wiz (2019–present)

Jo Hyun-woo (Korean: 조현우; born March 30, 1994, in Gunsan, North Jeolla) is a South Korean pitcher for the KT Wiz in the Korea Baseball Organization (KBO). He previously played in KBO for the Lotte Giants.
