= Kim Tae-hyung =

Kim Tae-hyung (Korean: 김태형) may refer to:

- Kim Tae-hyoung (born 1967), South Korean baseball player
- Kim Tae-hyeong (born 1988), Korean name of musician Paul Kim
- Kim Tae-hyung (footballer) (born 1989), South Korean footballer
- Kim Tae-hyung (born 1992), birth name of J.Seph, member of Kard
- Kim Tae-hyung (born 1995), birth name of V (singer), member of BTS

== See also ==
- Kim (Korean surname)
