= Korean Series =

Championship of KBO League

- Current season, competition or edition: 2026 Korean Series
- League: KBO League
- Sport: Baseball
- First season: 1982
- Most recent champion: Samsung Lions (9th title) (2026)
- Most titles: Kia Tigers (12)

The Korean Series (Korean: 한국시리즈; Hanja: 韓國시리즈; RR: Hanguk Sirijeu) is the final championship series of the KBO League. It has been held since the KBO League's first season in 1982 and is the final series of the post-season play-offs. From 2005 to 2013, the winner of the Korean Series went on to play in the Asia Series.

The teams finishing in fourth and fifth place in the regular season face each other in the wild card game, which was added to the KBO League postseason in 2015. The winner of the wild card game faces the team that finished in third place during the regular season in the first round of the play-offs, with the winner then facing the team that finished in second place during the regular season in the second round of the play-offs. The winner of that round faces the team that finished in first place for the championship in the Korean Series.

All championships are a best-of-seven playoff series between the league pennant winner and the winner of the second round of the play-offs. The series follow a 2–3–2 format since 2025; the first two games and the last two games, if necessary, are played at the home venue of the league pennant winner, while the third, fourth and fifth games are played at the home of the winner of the second round. If the game ends in a tie, more games would be scheduled until any one of the teams wins four games.

== Results ==
Winning team and losing team columns indicate the number of times that team has appeared in a Korean Series as well as each respective teams' Korean Series record to date.
Games in the KBO League have a limit to the number of extra innings and/or time that could be played before being officially declared a tied game (except in 2008 when this rule was removed). When post-season games were declared tied, they had to be replayed.

League pennant winner (1989–1998, 2001–present)
Dream League pennant winner (1999–2000)
Both first and latter halves pennant winner (1982–1988)
First half pennant winner (1982–1988)
Latter half pennant winner (1982–1988)

Year	Winning team	Manager	Series	Losing team	Manager	Most Valuable Player	Ref.
1982	OB Bears (1, 1–0)	Kim Yeong-duk	4–1–(1)^{[T]}	Samsung Lions (1, 0–1)	Seo Yeong-mu	Kim Yu-dong (OB-OF)	
1983	Haitai Tigers (1, 1–0)	Kim Eung-ryong	4–0–(1)^{[T]}	MBC Chungyong (1, 0–1)	Kim Dong-yub	Kim Bong-yeon (Haitai-IF)	
1984	Lotte Giants (1, 1–0)	Kang Byeong-cheol	4–3	Samsung Lions (2, 0–2)	Kim Yeong-duk	Yu Du-yeol (Lotte-OF)	
1985	Samsung Lions (1–2)	Kim Yeong-duk	No Korean Series^{[N]}				
1986	Haitai Tigers (2, 2–0)	Kim Eung-ryong	4–1	Samsung Lions (3, 1–3)	Kim Yeong-duk	Kim Jung-soo (Haitai-P)	
1987	Haitai Tigers (3, 3–0)	Kim Eung-ryong	4–0	Samsung Lions (4, 1–4)	Park Yeong-gil	Kim Jun-hwan (Haitai-OF)	
1988	Haitai Tigers (4, 4–0)	Kim Eung-ryong	4–2	Binggrae Eagles (1, 0–1)	Kim Yeong-duk	Mun Hui-su (Haitai-P)	
1989	Haitai Tigers (5, 5–0)	Kim Eung-ryong	4–1	Binggrae Eagles (2, 0–2)	Kim Yeong-duk	Park Cheol-u (Haitai-IF)	
1990	LG Twins (2, 1–1)	Baek In-chun	4–0	Samsung Lions (5, 1–5)	Jeong Dong-jin	Kim Yong-soo (LG-P)	
1991	Haitai Tigers (6, 6–0)	Kim Eung-ryong	4–0	Binggrae Eagles (3, 0–3)	Kim Yeong-duk	Jang Chae-geun (Haitai-C)	
1992	Lotte Giants (2, 2–0)	Kang Byeong-cheol	4–1	Binggrae Eagles (4, 0–4)	Kim Yeong-duk	Park Dong-hui (Lotte-P)	
1993	Haitai Tigers (7, 7–0)	Kim Eung-ryong	4–2–(1)^{[T]}	Samsung Lions (6, 1–6)	Woo Yong-deuk	Lee Jong-beom (Haitai-IF)	
1994	LG Twins (3, 2–1)	Lee Kwang-hwan	4–0	Pacific Dolphins (1, 0–1)	Jeong Dong-jin	Kim Yong-soo (LG-P)	
1995	OB Bears (2, 2–0)	Kim In-sik	4–3	Lotte Giants (3, 2–1)	Kim Yong-hee	Kim Min-ho (OB-IF)	
1996	Haitai Tigers (8, 8–0)	Kim Eung-ryong	4–2	Hyundai Unicorns (2, 0–2)	Kim Jae-bak	Lee Kang-chul (Haitai-P)	
1997	Haitai Tigers (9, 9–0)	Kim Eung-ryong	4–1	LG Twins (4, 2–2)	Cheon Bo-seong	Lee Jong-beom (Haitai-IF)	
1998	Hyundai Unicorns (3, 1–2)	Kim Jae-bak	4–2	LG Twins (5, 2–3)	Cheon Bo-seong	Chung Min-tae (Hyundai-P)	
1999	Hanwha Eagles (5, 1–4)	Lee Hui-su	4–1	Lotte Giants (4, 2–2)	Kim Myeong-seong	Koo Dae-sung (Hanwha-P)	
2000	Hyundai Unicorns (4, 2–2)	Kim Jae-bak	4–3	Doosan Bears (3, 2–1)	Kim In-sik	Tom Quinlan (Hyundai-3B)	
2001	Doosan Bears (4, 3–1)	Kim In-sik	4–2	Samsung Lions (7, 1–7)	Kim Eung-ryong	Tyrone Woods (Doosan-1B)	
2002	Samsung Lions (8, 2–7)	Kim Eung-ryong	4–2	LG Twins (6, 2–4)	Kim Sung-keun	Ma Hae-yeong (Samsung-OF)	
2003	Hyundai Unicorns (5, 3–2)	Kim Jae-bak	4–3	SK Wyverns (1, 0–1)	Cho Beom-hyeon	Chung Min-tae (Hyundai-P)	
2004	Hyundai Unicorns (6, 4–2)	Kim Jae-bak	4–2–(3)^{[T]}	Samsung Lions (9, 2–8)	Kim Eung-ryong	Cho Yong-joon (Hyundai-P)	
2005	Samsung Lions (10, 3–8)	Sun Dong-yol	4–0	Doosan Bears (5, 3–2)	Kim Kyung-moon	Oh Seung-hwan (Samsung-P)	
2006	Samsung Lions (11, 4–8)	Sun Dong-yol	4–1–(1)^{[T]}	Hanwha Eagles (6, 1–5)	Kim In-sik	Park Jin-man (Samsung-SS)	
2007	SK Wyverns (2, 1–1)	Kim Sung-keun	4–2	Doosan Bears (6, 3–3)	Kim Kyung-moon	Kim Jae-hyun (SK-OF)	
2008	SK Wyverns (3, 2–1)	Kim Sung-keun	4–1	Doosan Bears (7, 3–4)	Kim Kyung-moon	Choi Jeong (SK-3B)	
2009	Kia Tigers (10, 10–0)	Cho Beom-hyeon	4–3	SK Wyverns (4, 2–2)	Kim Sung-keun	Na Ji-wan (Kia-LF)	
2010	SK Wyverns (5, 3–2)	Kim Sung-keun	4–0	Samsung Lions (12, 4–9)	Sun Dong-yol	Park Jung-kwon (SK-1B/RF)	
2011	Samsung Lions (13, 5–9)	Ryu Joong-il	4–1	SK Wyverns (6, 3–3)	Lee Man-soo	Oh Seung-hwan (Samsung-P)	
2012	Samsung Lions (14, 6–9)	Ryu Joong-il	4–2	SK Wyverns (7, 3–4)	Lee Man-soo	Lee Seung-yeop (Samsung-1B)	
2013	Samsung Lions (15, 7–9)	Ryu Joong-il	4–3	Doosan Bears (8, 3–5)	Kim Jin-wook	Park Han-yi (Samsung-RF)	
2014	Samsung Lions (16, 8–9)	Ryu Joong-il	4–2	Nexen Heroes (1, 0–1)	Yeom Kyung-yup	Yamaico Navarro (Samsung-2B)	
2015	Doosan Bears (9, 4–5)	Kim Tae-hyoung	4–1	Samsung Lions (17, 8–10)	Ryu Joong-il	Jung Soo-bin (Doosan-CF)	
2016	Doosan Bears (10, 5–5)	Kim Tae-hyoung	4–0	NC Dinos (1, 0–1)	Kim Kyung-moon	Yang Eui-ji (Doosan-C)	
2017	Kia Tigers (11, 11–0)	Kim Ki-tai	4–1	Doosan Bears (11, 5–6)	Kim Tae-hyoung	Yang Hyeon-jong (Kia-P)	
2018	SK Wyverns (8, 4–4)	Trey Hillman	4–2	Doosan Bears (12, 5–7)	Kim Tae-hyoung	Han Dong-min (SK-RF)	
2019	Doosan Bears (13, 6–7)	Kim Tae-hyoung	4–0	Kiwoom Heroes (2, 0–2)	Jang Jung-suk	Oh Jae-il (Doosan-1B)	
2020	NC Dinos (2, 1–1)	Lee Dong-wook	4–2	Doosan Bears (14, 6–8)	Kim Tae-hyoung	Yang Eui-ji (NC-C)	
2021	KT Wiz (1, 1–0)	Lee Kang-chul	4–0	Doosan Bears (15, 6–9)	Kim Tae-hyoung	Park Kyung-su (KT-2B)	
2022	SSG Landers (9, 5–4)	Kim Won-hyong	4–2	Kiwoom Heroes (3, 0–3)	Hong Won-ki	Kim Kang-min (SSG-CF)	
2023	LG Twins (7, 3–4)	Youm Kyoung-youb	4–1	KT Wiz (2, 1–1)	Lee Kang-chul	Oh Ji-hwan (LG-SS)	
2024	Kia Tigers (12, 12–0)	Lee Bum-ho	4–1	Samsung Lions (18, 8–11)	Park Jin-man	Kim Sun-bin (Kia-2B)	
2025	LG Twins (8, 4–4)	Youm Kyoung-youb	4–1	Hanwha Eagles (7, 1–6)	Kim Kyung-moon	Kim Hyun-soo (LG-LF)	
2026	Samsung Lions (19, 9–11)	Park Jin-man	4–1	KT Wiz (3, 1–2)	Lee Kang-chul	Koo Ja-wook (Samsung-OF)	

== Records by team ==
In the sortable table below, teams are ordered first by number of wins, then by number of appearances, and finally by year of first appearance. In the "Season(s)" column, bold years indicate winning appearances.

Team	Wins	Losses	Apps	Win %	Season(s)
Haitai / Kia Tigers	12	0	12	1.000	1983, 1986, 1987, 1988, 1989, 1991, 1993, 1996, 1997, 2009, 2017, 2024
Samsung Lions	8+1^{[N]}	11	19	.421	1982, 1984, 1985,^{[N]} 1986, 1987, 1990, 1993, 2001, 2002, 2004, 2005, 2006, 2010, 2011, 2012, 2013, 2014, 2015, 2024, 2026
OB / Doosan Bears	6	9	15	.400	1982, 1995, 2000, 2001, 2005, 2007, 2008, 2013, 2015, 2016, 2017, 2018, 2019, 2020, 2021
SK Wyverns / SSG Landers	5	4	9	.556	2003, 2007, 2008, 2009, 2010, 2011, 2012, 2018, 2022
MBC Chungyong / LG Twins	4	4	8	.500	1983, 1990, 1994, 1997, 1998, 2002, 2023, 2025
Pacific Dolphins / Hyundai Unicorns^{[D]}	4	2	6	.667	1994, 1996, 1998, 2000, 2003, 2004
Lotte Giants	2	2	4	.500	1984, 1992, 1995, 1999
Binggrae / Hanwha Eagles	1	6	7	.143	1988, 1989, 1991, 1992, 1999, 2006, 2025
KT Wiz	1	2	3	.333	2021, 2023, 2026
NC Dinos	1	1	2	.500	2016, 2020
Nexen / Kiwoom Heroes	0	3	3	.000	2014, 2019, 2022

== Frequent matchups ==
The following are the ten matchups of teams that have occurred two or more times in the Korean Series.

Count	Matchup	Record	Years
5	Doosan Bears vs. Samsung Lions	Bears, 3‍–‍2	1982, 2001, 2005, 2013, 2015
4	Kia Tigers vs. Samsung Lions	Tigers, 4‍–‍0	1986, 1987, 1993, 2024
3	Kia Tigers vs. Hanwha Eagles	Tigers, 3‍–‍0	1988, 1989, 1991
3	SSG Landers vs. Doosan Bears	Landers, 3‍–‍0	2007, 2008, 2018
3	Samsung Lions vs. SSG Landers	Lions, 2‍–‍1	2010, 2011, 2012
2	Kia Tigers vs. LG Twins	Tigers, 2‍–‍0	1983, 1997
2	Samsung Lions vs. LG Twins	Tied, 1‍–‍1	1990, 2002
2	Lotte Giants vs. Hanwha Eagles	Tied, 1‍–‍1	1992, 1999
2	LG Twins vs. Hyundai Unicorns	Tied, 1‍–‍1	1994, 1998
2	Doosan Bears vs. NC Dinos	Tied, 1‍–‍1	2016, 2020

== See also ==
- Korea Baseball Organization#Awards
- Baseball awards#South Korea

== Notes ==
- ^{T} The 1982, 1983, 1993, and 2006 Korean Series each included one tied game. The 2004 Korean Series had three tied games.
- ^{N} No Korean Series played, the Samsung Lions won the title outright in the 1985 season due to winning both halves of the then split-season format; the league soon instituted rules to ensure the Korean Series would be played regardless if a team won both halves of the season.
- ^{D} The Hyundai Unicorns franchise was disbanded at the end of the 2007 season.
