= 2011 Korea Professional Baseball season =

2011 Lotte Card Pro Baseball
- League: Korea Professional Baseball
- Sport: Baseball
- Duration: April 2011 – October 2011
- Games: 133 per team
- Teams: 8

Regular Season
- Season champions: Samsung Lions
- Season MVP: Yoon Suk-min (Kia)

League Postseason
- Semiplayoff champions: SK Wyverns
- Semiplayoff runners-up: Kia Tigers
- Playoff champions: SK Wyverns
- Playoff runners-up: Lotte Giants

Korean Series
- Champions: Samsung Lions
- Runners-up: SK Wyverns
- Finals MVP: Seung-hwan Oh (Samsung)

KBO seasons
- ← 2010 2012 →

The 2011 Korea Professional Baseball season was the 30th season in the history of the Korea Professional Baseball. The Samsung Lions won the regular season and Korean Series.

== Format ==
=== Season format ===
- Regular season: 133 games for each team
- Semiplayoff: regular-season 3rd place vs. regular-season 4th place – best of 5
- Playoff: regular-deason 2nd place vs. semiplayoff winner – best of 5
- Korean Series: regular-deason 1st place vs. playoff winner – best of 7

=== To determine the final standings ===
- Champion (1st place): Korean Series winner
- Runner-up (2nd place): Korean Series loser
- 3rd–8th place: sort by regular-season record except teams to play in the Korean Series

== Regular season ==
Rank	Team	GP	W	D	L	Pct.
1	Samsung Lions	133	79	4	50	0.612
2	Lotte Giants	133	72	5	56	0.563
3	SK Wyverns	133	71	3	59	0.547
4	Kia Tigers	133	70	0	63	0.526
5	Doosan Bears	133	61	2	70	0.466
6	LG Twins	133	59	2	72	0.450
6	Hanwha Eagles	133	59	2	72	0.450
8	Nexen Heroes	133	51	2	80	0.389

Pennant Race Winner

Samsung Lions

== Post-season ==
=== Semiplayoff ===
SK Wyverns won the series, 3–1.

Game	Date	Score	Location	Time	Attendance
1	8 October 2011	SK Wyverns – 1, Kia Tigers – 5	Incheon	200 PM	-
2	9 October 2011	SK Wyverns – 3, Kia Tigers – 2	Incheon	2:00 PM	-
3	11 October 2011	KIA Tigers – 0, SK Wyverns – 2	Gwangju	6:00 PM	-
4	12 October 2011	Kia Tigers – 0, SK Wyverns – 8	Gwangju	6:00 PM	-

=== Playoff ===
SK Wyverns won the series, 3–2.

Game	Date	Score	Location	Time	Attendance
1	16 October 2011	Lotte Giants – 6, SK Wyverns – 7 (10th inning)	Busan	2:00 PM	-
2	17 October 2011	Lotte Giants – 4, SK Wyverns – 1	Busan	6:00 PM	-
3	19 October 2010	SK Wyverns – 3, Lotte Giants – 0	Incheon	6:00 PM	-
4	20 October 2011	SK Wyverns – 0, Lotte Giants – 2	Incheon	6:00 PM	-
5	23 October 2011	Lotte Giants – 4, SK Wyverns – 8	Busan	2:00 PM	-

=== Korean Series (championship) ===
Samsung Lions won the series, 4–1.

Game	Date	Score	Location	Time	Attendance
1	25 October 2011	Samsung Lions (2–0) SK Wyverns	Daegu Baseball Stadium, Daegu	6:00 PM	-
2	26 October 2011	Samsung Lions (2–1) SK Wyverns	Daegu Baseball Stadium, Daegu	2:00 PM	-
3	28 October 2011	Samsung Lions (1–2) SK Wyverns	Munhak Baseball Stadium, Incheon	6:00 PM	-
4	29 October 2011	Samsung Lions (8–4) SK Wyverns	Munhak Baseball Stadium, Incheon	2:00 PM	-
5	31 October 2011	Samsung Lions (1–0) SK Wyverns	Jamsil Baseball Stadium, Seoul	6:00 PM	-

2011 Korean Series Winner

Samsung Lions
Fifth title

== Foreign hitters ==
Team	Player	Position	In KBO since	Batting Average	Home runs	RBI	Notes
Doosan Bears	NONE	N/A					
Hanwha Eagles	Karim García	OF	2008	.246	18	61	
Kia Tigers	NONE	N/A					
LG Twins	NONE	N/A					
Lotte Giants	NONE	N/A					
Nexen Heroes	Cory Aldridge	OF	2011	.237	20	73	
Samsung Lions	Ryan Garko	IB	2011	.243	1	28	Released due to injury on 12 July
SK Wyverns	NONE	N/A					
