= Mon Yong-ik =

South Korean baseball player (born 1995)

KT Wiz – No. 13
- Pitcher
- Born: February 4, 1995 (age 31); Goyang, South Korea
- Bats: Right Throws: Right

KBO debut
- August 11, 2021, for the Samsung Lions

KBO statistics (through May 17, 2024)
- Win–loss record: 4–2
- Earned run average: 5.03
- Strikeouts: 63
- Stats at Baseball Reference

Teams
- Samsung Lions (2021–2023); KT Wiz (2024–present)

Mon Yong-ik (Korean: 문용익; born February 4, 1995, in Goyang, Gyeonggi) is a South Korean pitcher for the KT Wiz in the Korea Baseball Organization (KBO).
