= 2012 Korean Series =

Team (Wins)	Managers	Season
Samsung Lions (4)	Ryu Joong-il	(1) 80–2–51, .611, 8½ GA
SK Wyverns (2)	Lee Man-soo	(2) 71–3–59, .546, 8½ GB
- Dates: October 24–November 1
- MVP: Lee Seung-yuop

The Best-of-7 2012 Korean Series began on Tuesday, October 24, at the Daegu Baseball Stadium in Daegu, South Korea. It featured the Samsung Lions, who had claimed homefield advantage by finishing in first place at the end of the regular season, and the SK Wyverns, who finished second during the regular season and defeated the Lotte Giants in a best-of-5 playoff series (3 games to 2) to advance to the Finals. The Samsung Lions won the series in six games to collect their sixth Korean Series championship.

== Roster ==
Samsung Lions

2012 Samsung Lions
Roster
Pitchers: 1 Yoon Sung-hwan; 13 Jang Won-sam; 19 Jong Hyun-wook; 21 Oh Seung-hwan; 23 Cha Woo-chan; 25 Bae Young-soo; 26 Brian Gordon; 28 An Ji-man; 35 Kim Hui-geol; 47 Kwon Hyuk; 51 Mitch Talbot; 55 Sim Chang-min	Catchers: 20 Jin Kab-yong; 37 Lee Jeong-sik; 56 Lee Ji-young; Infielders: 5 Cho Dong-chan; 7 Kim Sang-su; 9 Kang Myung-goo; 14 Shin Myung-chul; 18 Park Seok-min; 36 Lee Seung-yuop	Outfielders: 24 Kang Bong-kyu; 33 Park Han-yi; 34 Choi Hyoung-woo; 59 Jung Hyung-sik; 65 Bae Young-seop	Manager: 75 Ryu Joong-il; Coaches

SK Wyverns

== Summary ==
Samsung Lions won the series, 4–2.

Game	Date	Score	Location	Time	Attendance
1	24 October 2012	SK Wyverns 1–3 Samsung Lions	Daegu Baseball Stadium, Daegu	-	-
2	25 October 2012	SK Wyverns 3–8 Samsung Lions	Daegu Baseball Stadium, Daegu	-	-
3	28 October 2012	Samsung Lions 8–12 SK Wyverns	Munhak Baseball Stadium, Incheon	-	-
4	29 October 2012	Samsung Lions 1–4 SK Wyverns	Munhak Baseball Stadium, Incheon	-	-
5	31 October 2012	SK Wyverns 1–2 Samsung Lions	Jamsil Baseball Stadium, Seoul	-	-
6	1 November 2012	Samsung Lions 7–0 SK Wyverns	Jamsil Baseball Stadium, Seoul	-	-

== Matchups ==
2012 Korean Series Champion

Samsung Lions
(Sixth title)

== See also ==
- 2012 Korea Professional Baseball season
- 2012 World Series
- 2012 Japan Series
