= 2011 Korean Series =

Team (Wins)	Managers	Season
Samsung Lions (4)	Ryu Joong-il	79–50–4 (.612)
SK Wyverns (1)	Lee Man-soo	71–59–3 (.546)
- Dates: October 25 – October 31
- Venues: Daegu Baseball Stadium; Munhak Baseball Stadium; Jamsil Baseball Stadium
- MVP: Seung-hwan Oh (Samsung)

The 2011 Korean Series was the championship series for Korea Professional Baseball (KPB) for the 2011 Korea Professional Baseball season. The 30th edition of the Korean Series, it featured the regular season champion Samsung Lions versus the SK Wyverns, who finished second during the regular season and defeated the Lotte Giants in a best-of-5 playoff series (3 games to 2) to advance to the Finals. The Samsung Lions won the series in five games to collect their fifth Korean Series championship.

== Matchups ==
=== Game 1 ===
Tuesday, October 25, 2011, at Daegu Baseball Stadium in Daegu

Team	1	2	3	4	5	6	7	8	9	R	H	E
SK Wyverns	0	0	0	0	0	0	0	0	0	0	5	1
Samsung Lions	0	0	0	2	0	0	0	0	X	2	5	1
WP: Cha Woo-Chan (1-0) LP: Ko Hyo-Jun (0-1) Sv: Oh Seung-Hwan (1)

=== Game 2 ===
Tuesday, October 28, 2011, at Daegu Baseball Stadium in Daegu

Team	1	2	3	4	5	6	7	8	9	R	H	E
SK Wyverns	0	0	0	0	0	0	0	1	0	1	7	1
Samsung Lions	0	0	0	2	0	2	0	0	X	2	6	1
WP: Kwon Oh-Joon (1-0) LP: Park Hui-Soo (0-1) Sv: Oh Seung-Hwan (2)

=== Game 3 ===
Saturday, October 28, 2011, at Munhak Baseball Stadium in Incheon

Team	1	2	3	4	5	6	7	8	9	R	H	E
Samsung Lions	0	0	0	0	0	0	0	1	0	1	7	0
SK Wyverns	0	0	0	1	1	0	0	0	X	2	5	0
WP: Song Eun-Beom (1-0) LP: Justin Germano (0-1) Sv: Yeom Jeong-Yuk (1); Home runs: SK: None; Samsung: Choi Dong-soo (1, 4th inning off Justin Germano), Park Jae-sang (1, 5th inning off Justin Germano)

- Choi Dong-soo (SK, 40 years, 1 month and 16 days) set a record for the oldest player to hit a home run in the Korean Series. (previous record: Park Kyung-Oan (SK): 38 years, 3 months and 7 days in 2010)

=== Game 4 ===
Monday, October 29, 2011, at Munhak Baseball Stadium in Incheon

Team	1	2	3	4	5	6	7	8	9	R	H	E
Samsung Lions	2	0	0	2	0	0	1	2	1	8	13	1
SK Wyverns	0	0	1	0	0	0	3	0	0	4	10	0
WP: Jeong In-Wuk (1-0) LP: Kim Kwang-Hyun (0-1); Home runs: Samsung: Shin Myung-Chul (2, 4th inning off Lee Jae Yeong), Choi Hyoung-woo(1, 7th inning off Lee Yeong-Wook); SK: Park Jae-sang(3, 7th inning off Jeong In-Wuk)

=== Game 5 ===
Tuesday, October 19, 2010, at Jamsil Baseball Stadium in Seoul

Team	1	2	3	4	5	6	7	8	9	R	H	E
SK Wyverns	0	0	0	0	0	0	0	0	0	0	6	0
Samsung Lions	0	0	0	1	0	0	0	0	X	1	4	0
WP: Cha Woo-Chan (2-0) LP: Brian Gordon (0-1) Sv: Oh Seung-Hwan (3); Home runs: SK: None; Samsung: Kang Bong-Gyu (1, 4th inning off Brian Gordon)

Samsung Lions closer Oh Seung-Hwan was named the series MVP.
