= 2019 Korean Series =

Champsionship of the 2019 KBO League

Team (Wins)	Manager(s)	Season
Doosan Bears (4)	Kim Tae-hyoung	88–55–1 (.615)
Kiwoom Heroes (0)	Jang Jeong-seok	86–57–1 (.601)
- Dates: October 22 – October 26

The 2019 Korean Series is the championship series of the 2019 KBO League season. The Doosan Bears, as the regular season champions, automatically advanced to the Korean Series, where they faced the Kiwoom Heroes. The series ran from October 22 to October 26.

The Bears swept the Heroes in four games to win the title.

== Background ==
The Doosan Bears won the 2015 and 2016 Korean Series. They lost the 2017 Korean Series to the Kia Tigers. and the 2018 Korean Series to the SK Wyverns. The team won the pennant race to advance directly to the Korean Series in dramatic fashion. Trailing the SK Wyverns for second place for most of the year, Doosan was 9 games back of SK by late August and even fell back to third place behind the Kiwoom Heroes. After a rally which started in late August and following a late-season collapse of SK, Doosan was able to secure the pennant in the last game of the season. During this last game against the NC Dinos, Doosan overcame a three-run deficit in the eighth inning to finally win by a score of 6–5 in extra innings. With this victory, Doosan achieved the same record as the Wyverns, 88–55–1, but was ranked above SK due to winning the regular season head-to-head record 9–7.

The Kiwoom Heroes, were founded in 2008, and have never won the Korean Series, despite appearing in the 2014 Korean Series and reaching the postseason in 6 of the past 7 seasons. 2019 marked the first year of the team's partnership with Kiwoom Securities, having been known as the Nexen Heroes the previous year. Kiwoom trailed SK and Doosan for most of the year, and finally settled for 3rd place in the regular season. In the semi-playoff, the Heroes beat the 4th-place LG Twins in 4 games, and swept the defending champions SK Wyverns in a rematch of the previous year's playoffs.

Nexen faced Doosan for the third time in the postseason, with Doosan winning their two previous confrontations in the semi-playoff round in 2013 and 2015.

== Summary ==
Doosan Bears won the series, 4–0.

Game	Date	Score	Location	Time	Attendance
1	October 22	Kiwoom Heroes – 6, Doosan Bears – 7	Jamsil Baseball Stadium	-	25,000
2	October 23	Kiwoom Heroes – 5, Doosan Bears – 6	Jamsil Baseball Stadium	-	25,000
3	October 25	Doosan Bears – 5, Kiwoom Heroes – 0	Gocheok Sky Dome	-	16,300
4	October 26	Doosan Bears – 11, Kiwoom Heroes – 9	Gocheok Sky Dome	-	-

== See also ==
- 2019 Japan Series
- 2019 World Series
