= Kim Eung-ryong =

South Korean baseball player and manager (born 1941)

Kim Eung-Ryong
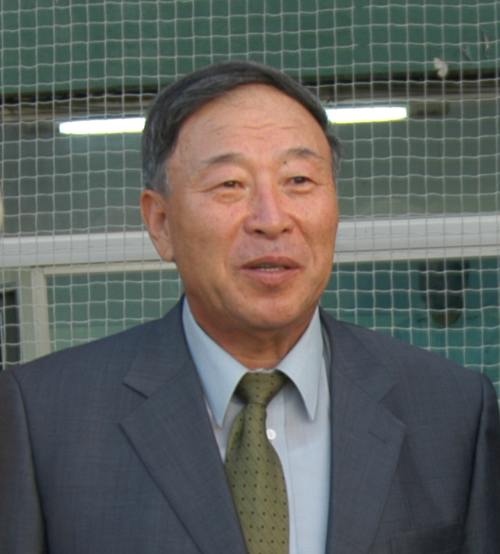
- Outfielder / Manager
- Born: September 15, 1941 (age 85); Pyongwon County, Heian'nan Province, Korea, Empire of Japan
- Bats: Right Throws: Right

Teams
- As manager: Haitai Tigers (1983–2000); Samsung Lions (2001–2004); Hanwha Eagles (2013–2014)

Career highlights and awards
- As manager: 10x Korean Series champion (1983, 1986, 1987, 1988, 1989, 1991, 1993, 1996, 1997, 2002)

- Kim Eung-ryong
- Hangul: 김응룡
- Hanja: 金應龍
- RR: Gim Eungryong
- MR: Kim Ŭngnyong

Kim Eung-Ryong (born September 15, 1941) is a Korean baseball manager. He is the winningest manager in the history of Korean professional baseball, having won ten Korean Series championships throughout his career. He was the manager of the Haitai Tigers (1983–2000), Samsung Lions (2001–2004), and Hanwha Eagles (2013–2014).

== Biography ==
He studied in the United States, attending Georgia Southern College, and then returned to Korea. He played outfield for the South Korea national baseball team in the 1962 Asian Baseball Championship, which ended up winning a Bronze Medal.

Kim managed the amateur baseball team sponsored by Haitai from 1964 to 1981. During that period he managed the South Korean team to its first international title in the 1977 Intercontinental Cup. He managed the national team to a Bronze Medal in the 1978 Amateur World Series.

Continuing his association with Haitai, Kim was hired by the professional KBO League Haitai Tigers in 1983. He won nine championships with the Tigers (1983, 1986–89, 1991, 1993, 1996–97). From 1986 to 1997 he led the Tigers to nine championships, never losing a Korean Series during that span.

Kim was the manager of the Bronze Medal-winning South Korea national baseball team in the 2000 Summer Olympics.

Leaving the Tigers after the 2001 season, Kim was hired by the Samsung Lions. During his four-year tenure with the team, he led them to the Korean Series three times, winning it once (in 2002).

Kim left managing in 2005, serving as president of the Samsung Lions until 2010, and then continuing on in an administrative role.

In 2016 Kim was hired as president of the Korea Baseball Softball Association.

== Managerial record ==
Season	Team	Finish	Rank	Games	Wins	Losses	Draws	Win%	Postseason
1983	Haitai Tigers	1/6	1/6	50	30	19	1	.612	Won Korean Series vs. MBC Chungyong (4–1–0)
1983	Haitai Tigers	1/6	4/6	50	25	25	0	.500	Won Korean Series vs. MBC Chungyong (4–1–0)
1984	Haitai Tigers	5/6	5/6	50	19	29	2	.396	Did not qualify
1984	Haitai Tigers	5/6	3/6	50	24	25	1	.490	Did not qualify
1985	Haitai Tigers	3/6	3/6	55	29	26	0	.527	Did not qualify
1985	Haitai Tigers	3/6	3/6	55	28	26	1	.519	Did not qualify
1986	Haitai Tigers	1/7	2/7	54	34	18	2	.654	Won Korean Series vs. Samsung Lions (4–1)
1986	Haitai Tigers	1/7	2/7	54	33	19	2	.635	Won Korean Series vs. Samsung Lions (4–1)
1987	Haitai Tigers	1/7	3/7	54	27	25	2	.519	Won Playoff vs. OB Bears (3–2); Won Korean Series vs. Samsung Lions (4–0)
1987	Haitai Tigers	1/7	2/7	54	28	23	3	.549	Won Playoff vs. OB Bears (3–2); Won Korean Series vs. Samsung Lions (4–0)
1988	Haitai Tigers	1/7	1/7	54	34	19	1	.639	Won Korean Series vs. Binggrae Eagles (4–2)
1988	Haitai Tigers	1/7	1/7	54	34	19	1	.639	Won Korean Series vs. Binggrae Eagles (4–2)
1989	Haitai Tigers	1/7	2/7	120	65	51	4	.558	Won Playoff vs. Pacific Dolphins (3–0); Won Korean Series vs. Binggrae Eagles (4–1)
1990	Haitai Tigers	3/7	2/7	120	68	49	3	.579	Lost Playoff vs. Samsung Lions (0–3)
1991	Haitai Tigers	1/8	1/8	126	79	42	5	.647	Won Korean Series vs. Binggrae Eagles (4–0)
1992	Haitai Tigers	3/8	2/8	126	71	54	1	.567	Lost Playoff vs. Lotte Giants (2–3)
1993	Haitai Tigers	1/8	1/8	126	81	42	3	.659	Won Korean Series vs. Samsung Lions (4–2)
1994	Haitai Tigers	4/8	4/8	126	65	59	2	.524	Lost Semi-playoff vs. Hanwha Eagles (0–2)
1995	Haitai Tigers	4/8	4/8	126	64	58	4	.524	Did not qualify
1996	Haitai Tigers	1/8	1/8	126	73	51	2	.587	Won Korean Series vs. Hyundai Unicorns (4–2)
1997	Haitai Tigers	1/8	1/8	126	75	50	1	.599	Won Korean Series vs. LG Twins (4–1)
1998	Haitai Tigers	5/8	5/8	126	61	64	1	.488	Did not qualify
1999	Haitai Tigers	7/8	4/4	132	60	69	3	.465	Did not qualify
2000	Haitai Tigers	6/8	4/4	133	57	72	4	.442	Did not qualify
2001	Samsung Lions	2/8	1/8	133	81	52	0	.609	Lost Korean Series vs. Doosan Bears (2–4)
2002	Samsung Lions	1/8	1/8	133	82	47	4	.636	Won Korean Series vs. LG Twins (4–2)
2003	Samsung Lions	4/8	3/8	133	76	53	4	.589	Lost Semi-playoff vs. SK Wyverns (0–2)
2004	Samsung Lions	2/8	2/8	133	73	52	8	.584	Won Playoff vs. Doosan Bears (3–1); Lost Korean Series vs. Hyundai Unicorns (2–3–4)
2013	Hanwha Eagles	9/9	9/9	128	42	85	1	.331	Did not qualify
2014	Hanwha Eagles	9/9	9/9	128	49	77	2	.389	Did not qualify
Overall record				Games	Wins	Losses	Draws	Win%	
				2935	1567	1300	68	.545	Won 10 Korean Series championships
