= Ha Jun-ho =

South Korean baseball player (born 1989)

KT Wiz – No. 28
- Pitcher / Outfielder
- Born: April 29, 1989 (age 37); Busan, South Korea
- Bats: Left Throws: Left

KBO debut
- April 25, 2009, for the Lotte Giants

Career statistics (through 2023 season)
- Win–loss record: 0–7
- Earned run average: 6.52
- Strikeouts: 77
- Batting average: .233
- Home runs: 14
- Runs batted in: 72
- Stats at Baseball Reference

Teams
- Lotte Giants (2009–2010, 2014–2015); KT Wiz (2015–present)

Ha Jun-ho (Korean: 하준호; born April 29, 1989, in Busan) is a South Korean pitcher for the KT Wiz in the Korea Baseball Organization (KBO). He previously played in KBO for the Lotte Giants.
