= Kim Ji-yeol =

South Korean baseball player

- Pitcher
- Born: August 9, 1988 (age 37); Cheongju, South Korea
- Batted: Right Threw: Right

KBO debut
- 2015, for the KT Wiz

Last KBO appearance
- 2018, for the KT Wiz

KBO statistics
- Batting average: .242
- Home runs: 8
- Runs batted in: 39

Teams
- KT Wiz (2015–2018)

- Kim Ji-yeol
- Hangul: 김지열
- Hanja: 金知熱
- RR: Gim Jiyeol
- MR: Kim Chiyŏl

Kim Ji-yeol (Korean: 김지열; born August 9, 1988) is a South Korean professional baseball outfielder. He joined the Hanwha Eagles in 2007. After that, he transferred to Kiwoom Heroes in 2013, and he moved to KT Wiz in 2014. He changed his name to Kim Ji-yeol from Kim Sa-yeon (김사연).
