= Lee Kang-chul =

South Korean baseball player (born 1966)

KT Wiz – No. 71
- Pitcher
- Born: May 24, 1966 (age 60); Gwangju, South Korea
- Batted: Right Threw: Right

KBO debut
- 1989, for the Haitai Tigers

Last KBO appearance
- 2005, for the Kia Tigers

KBO statistics
- Win–loss record: 152−109
- Earned run average: 3.29
- Strikeouts: 1,749
- Saves: 53
- Stats at Baseball Reference

Teams
- As player: Haitai Tigers (1989–1999); Samsung Lions (2000–2001); Kia Tigers (2001–2005); As coach: Kia Tigers 2nd Team (2006–2007); Kia Tigers (2007–2012); Nexen Heroes (2013–2016); Doosan Bears 2nd Team (2017); Doosan Bears (2018); South Korea (2017–2018); As manager: Doosan Bears 2nd team (2017); KT Wiz (2019–present); South Korea (2023)

Career highlights and awards
- As player: 5x Korean Series champion (1989, 1991, 1993, 1996-1997); KBO strikeout leader (1992); Korean Series MVP (1996); As coach: Korean Series champion (2009); As manager: Korean Series champion (2021); 40 Legend All-Stars (2022)
Medals
Coach for South Korea
Asian Games
Gold medal – first place	2018 Jakarta-Palembang	Team

- Lee Kang-chul
- Hangul: 이강철
- Hanja: 李強喆
- RR: I Gangcheol
- MR: I Kangch'ŏl

Lee Kang-chul (Korean: 이강철; born May 24, 1966) is a South Korean former professional baseball pitcher and current manager of the KT Wiz.

He was born in Gwangju, South Korea. A submarine-style pitcher, he played 16 seasons in the KBO League, mostly for the Haitai/Kia Tigers. He is second all-time in the KBO League in career strikeouts and third in career victories. Lee was one of the top KBO pitchers of the 1990s, and is the only pitcher from that league to have won 10+ games in ten consecutive seasons, which he did from 1989 to 1998.

== Playing career ==
Born in Gwangju, Lee attended Gwangju Jeil High School and Dongguk University. He pitched for the South Korea national baseball team in the 1988 Baseball World Cup and also in the 1988 Summer Olympics.

Lee debuted with the Haitai Tigers in 1989 at age 23 and had an immediate impact, going 15–8 with a 3.23 earned run average as the Tigers won the Korean Series. (During his career, Lee would win four more KBO championships with the Tigers.)

Lee went 18–9 in 1992, with 155 strikeouts, enough to lead the KBO that year.

He was the Most Valuable Player of the 1996 Korean Series, which the Tigers won 4-games-to-2 over the Hyundai Unicorns. During the Series, Lee had two wins, a save, and a 0.56 ERA.

Lee sat out the 1999 season and returned to the KBO in 2000 with the Samsung Lions. He didn't pitch well for them, and mid-season 2001 was traded back to the Tigers franchise (now known as the Kia Tigers). In his second stint with the Tigers he was primarily a relief pitcher.

During the 2004 season, Lee broke Sun Dong-yol's career KBO strikeout record of 1,698, but Lee's total was surpassed later that season by current KBO career strikeout king Song Jin-woo.

Lee retired in 2005. His 1,749 career strikeouts are second all-time in the KBO League, and his 152 victories are third on the all-time list.

== Coaching/managing career ==
Lee began coaching the season after he retired, serving as the Tigers' pitching coach from 2006 to 2012. He was "head coach" of the Nexen Heroes for four seasons, from 2013 to 2016. Lee coached for the South Korea national baseball team that won the silver medal in the 2017 Asia Professional Baseball Championship. Lee then moved to the Doosan Bears, serving as the team's KBO Futures League manager in 2017 and the KBO team's pitching coach in the 2018 season.

He has been the manager of the KT Wiz since the end of the 2018 season. Lee led the young club to its first .500 record in his first year as manager.

== See also ==
- List of KBO career strikeout leaders
- List of KBO career win leaders
