= Jamsil =

Jamsil may refer to:

- Jamsil Arena, an indoor sporting venue in Seoul, South Korea
- Jamsil Baseball Stadium, in Seoul, South Korea
- Jamsil Station, a station on the Seoul Metropolitan Subway
- Jamsil Students' Gymnasium, an indoor sporting venue in Seoul, South Korea
- Jamsil-dong, a neighbourhood in Seoul
