= 2020 Korean Series =

Team (Wins)	Managers	Season
NC Dinos (4)	Lee Dong-wook	83–55–6 (.601)
Doosan Bears (2)	Kim Tae-hyoung	79–61–4 (.564)
- Dates: November 17 – November 24
- MVP: Yang Eui-ji (NC Dinos)

Broadcast
- Television: MBC (Game 1, 2, 5); KBS2 (Game 3, 6); SBS (Game 4); ESPN (United States)

The 2020 Korean Series was the championship series of the 2020 KBO League season. The NC Dinos, as the regular season champions, automatically advanced to the Korean Series, where they faced the Doosan Bears, which advanced via the tenpin bowling-style stepladder final.

Because of KBO coverage during the COVID-19 pandemic, ESPN covered the Korean Series live in the United States.

== Summary ==
NC Dinos won the series, 4–2.

Game	Date	Score	Location	Time	Attendance
1	November 17	Doosan Bears – 3, NC Dinos – 5	Gocheok Sky Dome	3:21	8,200
2	November 18	Doosan Bears – 5, NC Dinos – 4	Gocheok Sky Dome	3:38	8,200
3	November 20	NC Dinos – 6, Doosan Bears – 7	Gocheok Sky Dome	4:24	5,100
4	November 21	NC Dinos – 3, Doosan Bears – 0	Gocheok Sky Dome	3:28	5,100
5	November 23	Doosan Bears – 0, NC Dinos – 5	Gocheok Sky Dome	3:01	5,100
6	November 24	Doosan Bears – 2, NC Dinos – 4	Gocheok Sky Dome	3:34	1,670

== See also ==
- 2020 Japan Series
- 2020 World Series
