= Park Han-yi =

South Korean baseball player (born 1979)

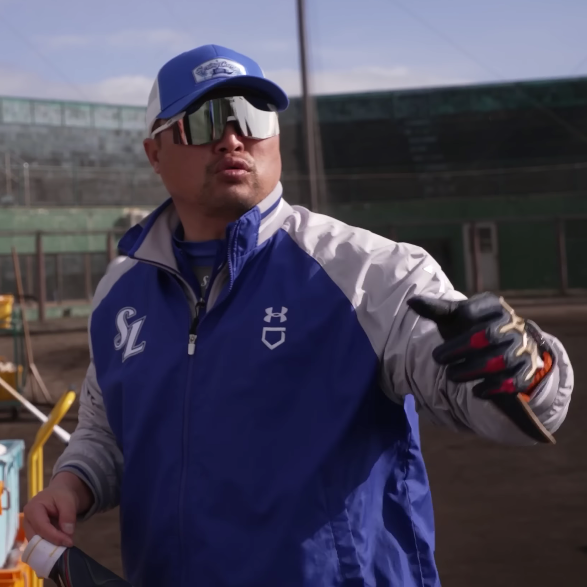
- Park Han-yi in 2025
- Outfielder
- Born: January 28, 1979 (age 47); Busan, South Korea
- Batted: Left Threw: Left

KBO debut
- April 5, 2001, for the Samsung Lions

Last KBO appearance
- May 26, 2019, for the Samsung Lions

KBO statistics
- Batting average: .294
- Home runs: 146
- Runs batted in: 906
- Hits: 2,174
- Stats at Baseball Reference

Teams
- Samsung Lions (2001–2019)

Career highlights and awards
- As player: 7x Korean Series champion (2002, 2005-2006 , 2011, 2012, 2013, 2014); Korean Series MVP (2013); 2x KBO League Golden Glove Award (2004, 2006); As coach: Korean Series champion (2026)

Park Han-yi (Korean: 박한이; Hanja: 朴漢伊; born January 28, 1979, in Busan, South Korea) is a South Korean former professional baseball outfielder. He played in the KBO League for the Samsung Lions from 2001 to 2019.

== Amateur career ==
In July 1997, as a freshman at Dongguk University, Park got his first call-up to the South Korea national baseball team for the team's five annual friendly matches against the USA national baseball team in California, United States.

In July 1998, as a sophomore, Park was selected for the South Korean national team again, and participated in the 1998 Baseball World Cup. South Korea eventually claimed the silver medal two times in a row, and Park led the team attack alongside cleanup hitter Choi Hee-Seop, going 17-for-41 (.415) with 10 runs. In November, Park was called up to the South Korean national team for the 1998 Asian Games, which included professional players for the first time ever. He led his team to their first Asian Game gold medal, going 10-for-23 (.435) with a home run and 3 RBIs as a leadoff hitter.

In September 1999, Park was selected by the South Korean national team to compete in the 1999 Asian Baseball Championship. He was one of the only four amateur players on the roster. Team Korea won their two consecutive Asian Championship, and Park served as a backup center fielder to Lee Byung-Kyu in the tournament. In November, Park competed for the South Korea national baseball team, which exclusively consisted of college players, in the 1999 Intercontinental Cup. South Korea finished disappointing 7th in the competition, but in their first game of the round-a-robin tournament, Park led his team to a memorable 4-3 victory over eventual winner Cuba, smacking a two-RBI single to tie the game up at 3-3 in the bottom of the eighth inning. It was South Korea's first victory over Cuba at the major international baseball competitions organized by the IBAF.

=== Notable international amateur competitions ===
Year	Venue	Competition	Team	Individual note
1998	Italy	Baseball World Cup	Silver medal	.415 BA (17-for-41), 10 R
1998	Thailand	Asian Games	Gold medal	.435 BA (10-for-23), 1 HR, 3 RBI, 7 R
1999	South Korea	Asian Baseball Championship	Gold medal	.000 BA (0-for-3), 2 RBI
1999	Australia	Intercontinental Cup	7th	

== Professional career ==
Signed by the Samsung Lions after graduation from college in 2001, Park made his KBO debut on April 5, 2001, against the Hanwha Eagles. In his debut game, which was also the Lions' opening game of the 2001 season, he hit a leadoff single in the game's first at-bat off Eagles' starter Song Jin-Woo. Next day, Park smacked his first professional home run against the Eagles. Appearing in 130 games as a leadoff man for the Lions, he had a solid rookie season with a .279 batting average, 13 home runs, 61 RBIs and 17 stolen bases, and finished the runner-up in the 2001 KBO Rookie of the Year balloting.

In 2002, Park played in all 133 regular-season games as the team's leadoff hitter, batting .272 with 137 hits, 10 home runs, 47 RBIs and 13 stolen bases, and made his first All Star Game appearance in July.

Park had a career-best year in 2003. That year, he led the KBO league in hits (173), accumulating 113 runs and 17 stolen bases. He also hit .322, finishing sixth in the batting race. In November, Park competed for South Korea national baseball team in the 2003 Asian Baseball Championship, but his performance was very disappointing, going 0-for-7 as a backup center fielder.

Park had another solid season in 2004, batting .310 (tenth in the league) with 156 hits (fourth in the league), career-highs 16 home runs and 63 RBIs. After the season, he won his first KBO League Golden Glove Award as an outfielder.

In 2005, Park ranked third in the league in hits (139), posting 9 home runs and 59 RBIs, but his batting average fell to .295.

In 2006, Park led the KBO league in runs (89), posting 134 hits (sixth in the league) and 15 stolen bases, and won his second Gold Glove award. However, his batting average dipped again to .285., and struck out a career high of 62 times.

Park had his worst season In 2007. He struggled at the plate all season, hitting a career-low .267. He finished with career-lows 2 home runs and 27 RBIs, and also posted career-lows in slugging percentage (.309) and on-base percentage (.359).

But Park came back strong in 2008, batting .316 (8th in the league) with a .414 on-base percentage (5th in the league). He missed 20 games due to injuries, but accumulated 117 hits, 41 RBIs and 57 runs.

In 2013, Park was chosen as the Korean Series MVP after batting .292 with six RBIs, six runs scored, and two steals in a seven-game series victory over the Doosan Bears. That year, the Lions became the first KBO team to ever win the Korean Series after trailing three games to one.

On May 27, 2019, Park abruptly retired from professional baseball after getting caught driving under the influence of alcohol in the city of Daegu. He made the following statement explaining his decision:

"I've decided to retire because DUI cases can never be condoned under any circumstances. I have no excuse. I will humbly accept whatever punishments I receive. I apologize to all the fans and to the ball club."

At the time of his retirement, Park was third on the all-time hits list in the KBO with 2,174 and fourth in runs scored with 1,211. He also sat at fourth in games played with 2,127 appearances - all of which came with the Samsung Lions over the course of 19 seasons. Park's streak of 16 consecutive seasons with at least 100 hits tied for the longest such streak in league history.

=== Notable international professional competitions ===
Year	Venue	Competition	Team	Individual note
2003	Japan	Asian Baseball Championship	Bronze medal	.000 BA (0-for-7)

== Trivia ==
Park was known for his extensively lengthy and quirky pre-at-bat routine in the KBO league. He continued the routine every at-bat since he got his first professional hit right after a long pre-batting warm up in his pro debut game in 2001.

== See also ==
- List of KBO career hits leaders
