= 2013 Korean Series =

Team (Wins)	Managers	Season
Samsung Lions (4)	Ryu Joong-il	75–51–2, .595
Doosan Bears (3)	Kim Jin-wook	71–51–3, .568
- Dates: October 24–November 1
- MVP: Park Han-yi (Samsung)

The 2013 Korean Series was the championship series of the 2013 Korea Professional Baseball season. The regular season champions, the Samsung Lions, defeated the Doosan Bears in seven games to win their third consecutive Korean Series championship. Outfielder Park Han-yi was named Series MVP.

== Background ==
The Samsung Lions had claimed homefield advantage by finishing in first place at the end of the regular season, while the Doosan Bears, who finished second during the regular season and defeated the LG Twins in a best-of-5 playoff series (3 games to 2) to advance to the Finals.

== Roster ==
Samsung Lions

2013 Samsung Lions
Roster
Pitchers: 1 Yoon Sung-hwan; 13 Jang Won-sam; 21 Oh Seung-hwan; 23 Cha Woo-chan; 25 Bae Young-soo; 28 An Ji-man; 47 Kwon Hyuk; 55 Sim Chang-min	Catchers: 20 Jin Kab-yong; 56 Lee Ji-young; Infielders: 9 Kang Myung-goo; 18 Park Seok-min; 36 Lee Seung-yuop	Outfielders: 33 Park Han-yi; 34 Choi Hyoung-woo; 59 Jung Hyung-sik; 65 Bae Young-seop	Manager: 75 Ryu Joong-il; Coaches

Doosan Bears

== Summary ==
Samsung Lions won the series, 4–3.

Game	Date	Score	Location	Time	Attendance
1	24 October 2013	Doosan Bears 7–2 Samsung Lions	Daegu Baseball Stadium, Daegu	-	-
2	25 October 2013	Doosan Bears 5–1 Samsung Lions (13th inning)	Daegu Baseball Stadium, Daegu	-	-
3	27 October 2013	Samsung Lions 3–2 Doosan Bears	Jamsil Baseball Stadium, Seoul	-	-
4	28 October 2013	Samsung Lions 1–2 Doosan Bears	Jamsil Baseball Stadium, Seoul	-	-
5	29 October 2013	Samsung Lions 7–5 Doosan Bears	Jamsil Baseball Stadium, Seoul	-	-
6	31 October 2013	Doosan Bears 2–6 Samsung Lions	Daegu Baseball Stadium, Daegu	-	-
7	1 November 2013	Doosan Bears 3–7 Samsung Lions	Daegu Baseball Stadium, Daegu	-	-

== Matchups ==
2013 Korean Series Champion

Samsung Lions
(Seventh title)
