= Kim In-sik =

South Korean baseball player (born 1947)

Kim In-Sik
- Manager
- Born: May 1, 1947 (age 79); Seoul, Southern Korea
- Bats: Right Throws: Right

Teams
- As manager: Ssangbangwool Raiders (1990–1992); OB / Doosan Bears (1994–2003); Hanwha Eagles (2005–2009); South Korea national team (2002, 2006–2009, 2015–present); As coach: Haitai Tigers (1986–1989)

Career highlights and awards
- 2x Korean Series champion (1995, 2001)

- Kim In-sik
- Hangul: 김인식
- Hanja: 金寅植
- RR: Gim Insik
- MR: Kim Insik

Kim In-Sik (Korean: 김인식; Hanja: 金寅植) is a former manager of the Korea Baseball Organization. He was the manager of the South Korean national baseball team in the late 2000s and again in the 2010s when he was named as such in June 2015.

== Playing career ==
Kim played for amateur teams Crown Beer and Hanil Bank as a pitcher from 1965 to 1972, but with continuing arm and shoulder trouble, he retired after the 1972 season.

== Manager career ==
=== KBO Manager ===
In 1973 Kim managed Baemoon High School until 1977, and also coached Sangmoon High School during 3 years.

He was the manage of the Dongguk University baseball team from 1982 to 1985. Then, Kim moved into the professional ranks in 1986 when he became the bench coach of the Haitai Tigers from 1986 to 1989.

Kim managed during his career the Ssangbangwool Raiders from 1990 to 1992 and the Doosan Bears from 1995 to 2003. For the Bears, he led Doosan to Korean Series titles in 1995 and 2001.

In November 2004, Kim was hired to manage the Hanwha Eagles. One month later he suffered a stroke but recovered enough to stay on as manager. Kim led the Eagles to the Korean Series in 2006 but the team lost to the Samsung Lions. The Eagles did not qualify for the postseason in 2009, and Kim resigned after the season.

=== Team Korea Manager ===
He was the bench coach of the South Korea national baseball team in the 2000 Summer Olympics under manager Kim Eung-Yong. The team won the Bronze medal after defeating Japan by a 3-1 score. Then Kim was named national team manager and led his team to the gold medal in the 2002 Asian Games, defeating Chinese Taipei 4-3 in the gold medal match.

He was the manager of the South Korean national team that played in the 2006 World Baseball Classic and won every game they played in Pool A. They advanced to round two, again winning all three games to secure a place in the semifinals. Upon reaching the semifinals, the South Korean government announced that it would waive for the players on the team the mandatory two-year military service required of all young South Korean men. However, at the semifinals, the South Korean team lost to Japan, whom they had beaten twice previously. This led to controversy in South Korea over the regulations of the WBC concerning the fact that South Korea had to face Japan three times and that it was Japan that was allowed to go to the finals, when it had four victories and three losses up to that point, two of those losses to South Korea, while the South Korean team, which had only one loss and had already beaten Japan twice, was eliminated from the finals. Kim also led the South Korean team to the final of the 2009 World Baseball Classic, where they finished in second place.

== Filmography ==
=== Television show ===
Year	Title	Network	Role	Ref.
2022	Back to the Ground	MBN	Head coach	
