= Lee Jong-beom =

South Korean baseball player and coach (born 1970)

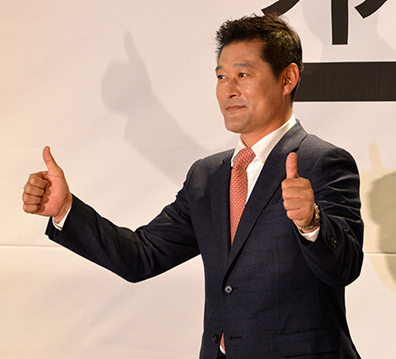
- Shortstop, Outfielder
- Born: August 15, 1970 (age 56); Gwangju, South Korea
- Batted: Right Threw: Right

Professional debut
- KBO: April 10, 1993, for the Haitai Tigers
- NPB: 1998, for the Chunichi Dragons

Last appearance
- NPB: 2001, for the Chunichi Dragons
- KBO: May 26, 2012, for the Kia Tigers

KBO statistics
- Batting average: .297
- Hits: 1,797
- Home runs: 194
- Runs batted in: 730
- Stolen bases: 510

NPB statistics
- Batting average: .261
- Hits: 286
- Home runs: 27
- Runs batted in: 99
- Stats at Baseball Reference

Teams
- As player: Haitai Tigers (1993–1997); Chunichi Dragons (1998–2001); Kia Tigers (2001–2012); As coach: Hanwha Eagles (2013–2014)

Career highlights and awards
- KBO: KBO MVP (1994); 6× KBO Golden Glove (1993–1994, 1996–1997, 2002–2003); 13× KBO All-Star (1993–1997, 2002–2009); KBO batting champion (1994); 4× Korean Series champion (1993, 1996–1997, 2009); 2× Korean Series MVP (1993, 1997); Kia Tigers No. 7 retired; International: All-World Baseball Classic Team (2006)

- Lee Jong-beom
- Hangul: 이종범
- Hanja: 李鍾範
- RR: I Jongbeom
- MR: I Chongbŏm

Lee Jong-beom (Korean: 이종범; born August 15, 1970) is a South Korean former professional baseball player who played for the Kia Tigers (formerly the Haitai Tigers) in the KBO League and the Chunichi Dragons in Japan from 1998 to 2001. He is nicknamed "Son of the Wind" (바람의 아들) for his speed. (He was also known as "Baseball Genius" and the "Korean Ichiro".) Lee is widely considered one of the best five-tool players in Korean baseball history, and the best all-around KBO player of the 1990s.

Lee was the 1994 KBO League MVP, a 13-time KBO All Star, and a six-time winner of the KBO League Golden Glove Award. He holds the single-season stolen base record in the KBO, with 84, and once hit .393 in a season, second-best all-time. Lee also won the Korean Series Most Valuable Player Award twice (his Tigers won four Korean Series championships). Lee's number 7 was retired by the Kia Tigers in 2012.

He started his career at shortstop, where he played through 1997, and mainly played outfield in later years.

== Career ==
Lee Jong-Beom's number 7 was retired by the Kia Tigers in 2012.

Lee graduated from Gwangju Jeil High School, where he excelled in baseball, leading his team to the Cheongryonggi championship as a senior. After leading the Konkuk University baseball team to a victory in the College Baseball Fall League in 1992, Lee was drafted in the first round by the KIA Tigers (Haitai Tigers at the time) in 1993

He burst onto the KBO scene as a rookie shortstop in 1993, leading the league in runs, stealing 73 bases, being named to the All-Star team, winning a Golden Glove Award, and leading the Tigers to the Korean Series championship. During the Series, Lee hit .313 (9 hits in 29 at-bats) with three steals, and was given the Korean Series Most Valuable Player Award.

His sophomore season was just as impressive, as he hit .393 (second all-time in the KBO to Baek In-chun, who hit .412 in 1982), led the league in hits and runs, and stole a league-record 84 bases. That year he won the KBO League Most Valuable Player Award and his second Golden Glove.

Lee played only a half-season's worth of games in 1995 due to commitments for military service, which is mandatory for all male South Korean citizens over 18.

In 1996, Lee led the league in runs and again won a Golden Glove. The Tigers prevailed in the Korean Series, with Lee again receiving the series MVP award.

Lee had a "30-70 season" in 1997, in which he hit 30 home runs and stole more than 70 bases (73 in total). He led the league in runs, picked up another Golden Glove, and his Tigers again won the KBO championship.

Lee moved to the NPB in 1998, playing for the Chunichi Dragons from 1998 to 2001. Over four seasons in the NPB, Lee hit a disappointing .261 with a total of 27 home runs, 99 RBI, and 53 stolen bases (he was also hit by a pitch and broke his elbow in 1998). While in the NPB, Lee shifted from shortstop to the outfield.

After a slow start in Japan in 2001, Lee returned to the KBO and the Tigers. He returned to form in 2002–2004, winning two more Golden Glove awards, leading the league in doubles in 2003, and in runs in 2004. Despite this, he voluntarily took a pay cut after the 2004 season.

Joining as the captain of the Korean national team, Lee had six doubles and hit .400 Korean team in the 2006 World Baseball Classic leading South Korea to win a bronze medal. He was named as an outfielder to the All WBC Team (alongside Ken Griffey Jr. and Ichiro Suzuki).

In April 2012, prior to opening day, Lee announced his retirement from baseball; at that point, he was the KBO's oldest active player. His retirement ceremony was held on May 26, 2012 and his number was officially retired that same day

Over his KBO career, he accumulated 510 stolen bases (second all-time to Jeon Jun-ho), winning four Gold Gloves as a shortstop and two as an outfielder, and never missing a single All Star Game during his professional career in Korea.

== Post-playing career ==
Lee served as a base coach for the Hanwha Eagles in 2013–2014, batting coach for the LG Twins from 2019-2023, and special assistant training coach for the Texas Rangers in 2024. He also was on the coaching staff for the 2017 and 2018 South Korean National Team.

Lee also become a commentator for the MBC SPORTS+ broadcast from 2015-2018 and picking it back up in 2026 along with being a special commentator for the 2023 World Baseball Classic

== Personal life ==
Lee is married to Jeong Yeon-hee and they have a son and a daughter; both of which were born in Japan when he was playing there. Their son Jung-hoo Lee, is an MLB player for the San Francisco Giants, and won the KBO League Rookie of the Year Award in 2017 and the KBO League MVP Award in 2022 making them the first father-son duo to have won Rookie of the Year and MVP. Their son-in-law is pitcher Woo-suk Go.

== See also ==
- List of KBO career stolen bases leaders
