= Cho Bum-hyun =

South Korean baseball player

- Catcher / Manager
- Born: October 1, 1960 (age 65)
- Batted: Right Threw: Right

KBO debut
- March 28, 1982, for the OB Bears

Last appearance
- 1992, for the Samsung Lions

KBO statistics
- Batting average: .201
- Home runs: 12
- Runs batted in: 107
- Stats at Baseball Reference

Teams
- As player: OB Bears (1982–1990); Samsung Lions (1991–1992); As coach: Samsung Lions (1992, 2000–2002, 2013); Ssangbangwool Raiders (1993–1999); Kia Tigers (2007); As manager: SK Wyverns (2003–2006); Kia Tigers (2008–2011); KT Wiz (2014–2016)

Career highlights and awards
- (gold) Asian Games champion (2010)

- Cho Bum-hyun
- Hangul: 조범현
- Hanja: 曺凡鉉
- RR: Jo Beomhyeon
- MR: Cho Pŏmhyŏn

Cho Bum-hyun (born October 1, 1960) is the former manager of the KT Wiz, and a former catcher in the Korea Baseball Organization.
