= 2014 Korean Series =

Team (Wins)	Manager(s)	Season
Samsung Lions (4)	Ryu Joong-il	(1) 79–3–47, .624, ½ GA
Nexen Heroes (2)	Yeom Kyung-yup	(2) 78–2–48, .619, ½ GB
- Dates: November 4–11
- MVP: Yamaico Navarro

The 2014 Korean Series was the championship series of the 2014 Korea Professional Baseball season. The regular season champions, the Samsung Lions, defeated the Nexen Heroes in six games to win their fourth consecutive Korean Series championship.

== Summary ==
Samsung Lions won the series, 4–2.

Game	Date	Score	Location	Time	Attendance
1	November 4	Nexen Heroes 4 – 2 Samsung Lions	Daegu Baseball Stadium, Daegu	3:10	10,000
2	November 5	Nexen Heroes 1 – 7 Samsung Lions	Daegu Baseball Stadium, Daegu	3:32	10,000
3	November 7	Samsung Lions 3 – 1 Nexen Heroes	Mokdong Baseball Stadium, Seoul	3:34	10,500
4	November 8	Samsung Lions 3 – 9 Nexen Heroes	Mokdong Baseball Stadium, Seoul	2:45	10,500
5	November 10	Nexen Heroes 1 – 2 Samsung Lions	Jamsil Baseball Stadium, Seoul	3:12	23,257
6	November 11	Samsung Lions 11 – 1 Nexen Heroes	Jamsil Baseball Stadium, Seoul	3:33	24,291

== Matchups ==
=== Game 1 ===
Tuesday, November 4, 2014 - 6:30 p.m. (KST) at Daegu Baseball Stadium in Daegu

Team	1	2	3	4	5	6	7	8	9	R	H	E
Nexen Heroes	0	0	2	0	0	0	0	2	0	4	6	0
Samsung Lions	0	0	2	0	0	0	0	0	0	2	4	0
WP: Cho Sang-woo (1–0) LP: Cha Woo-chan (0–1) Sv: Son Seung-lak (1); Home runs: NEX: Kang Jung-ho (1); SAM: Yamaico Navarro (1); Attendance: 10,000; Boxscore

=== Game 2 ===
Wednesday, November 5, 2014 - 6:30 p.m. (KST) at Daegu Baseball Stadium in Daegu

Team	1	2	3	4	5	6	7	8	9	R	H	E
Nexen Heroes	0	0	0	1	0	0	0	0	0	1	5	1
Samsung Lions	1	2	3	0	0	0	0	1	X	7	10	0
WP: Yoon Sung-hwan (1–0) LP: Henry Sosa (0–1); Home runs: NEX: Park Byung-ho (1); SAM: Yamaico Navarro (2), Lee Seung-yeop (1); Attendance: 10,000; Boxscore

=== Game 3 ===
Friday, November 7, 2014 - 6:30 p.m. (KST) at Mokdong Baseball Stadium in Seoul

Team	1	2	3	4	5	6	7	8	9	R	H	E
Samsung Lions	0	0	0	0	0	0	0	1	2	3	7	0
Nexen Heroes	0	0	0	0	1	0	0	0	0	1	4	2
WP: An Ji-man (1–0) LP: Han Hyun-hee (0–1) Sv: Lim Chang-yong (1); Home runs: SAM: Park Han-yi (1); NEX: Vinny Rottino (1); Attendance: 10,500; Boxscore

=== Game 4 ===
Saturday, November 8, 2014 - 2:00 p.m. (KST) at Mokdong Baseball Stadium in Seoul

Team	1	2	3	4	5	6	7	8	9	R	H	E
Samsung Lions	0	0	0	0	0	0	1	0	2	3	4	1
Nexen Heroes	2	3	0	2	0	0	1	1	X	9	9	1
WP: Andy Van Hekken (1–0) LP: J. D. Martin (0–1); Home runs: SAM: Yamaico Navarro (3); NEX: Yoo Han-joon 2 (2), Lee Taek-keun (1), Park Hun-do (1); Attendance: 10,500; Boxscore

=== Game 5 ===
Monday, November 10, 2014 - 6:30 p.m. (KST) at Jamsil Baseball Stadium in Seoul

Team	1	2	3	4	5	6	7	8	9	R	H	E
Nexen Heroes	0	0	0	0	0	1	0	0	0	1	5	1
Samsung Lions	0	0	0	0	0	0	0	0	2	2	7	0
WP: An Ji-man (2–0) LP: Son Seung-lak (0–1); Attendance: 23,257; Boxscore

=== Game 6 ===
Tuesday, November 11, 2014 - 6:30 p.m. (KST) at Jamsil Baseball Stadium in Seoul

Team	1	2	3	4	5	6	7	8	9	R	H	E
Samsung Lions	0	0	4	0	0	3	3	0	1	11	11	1
Nexen Heroes	0	0	0	1	0	0	0	0	0	1	4	3
WP: Yoon Sung-hwan (2–0) LP: Oh Jae-young (0–1); Home runs: SAM: Yamaico Navarro (4); NEX: None; Attendance: 24,291; Boxscore

2014 Korean Series Champion

Samsung Lions
(Eighth title)

== See also ==
- 2014 Korea Professional Baseball season
- 2014 World Series
- 2014 Japan Series
