= Korean Series Most Valuable Player Award =

- Awarded for: Most valuable player of the annual Korean Series
- Country: South Korea
- Presented by: KBO League
- First award: 1982
- Currently held by: Koo Ja-wook of Samsung Lions

The Korean Series Most Valuable Player (MVP) Award is given to the player deemed to have the most impact on his team's performance in the Korean Series, which is the final round of the KBO League postseason. The award was first presented in 1982.

== List ==
| Year | Player | Team | Position | Ref. |
|---|---|---|---|---|
| 1982 | Kim Yu-dong | OB Bears | Outfielder | |
| 1983 | Kim Bong-yeon | Haitai Tigers | Infielder | |
| 1984 | Yoo Doo-yeol | Lotte Giants | Outfielder | |
| 1985 | no series held | | | |
| 1986 | Kim Jung-soo | Haitai Tigers | Pitcher | |
| 1987 | Kim Joon-hwan | Haitai Tigers | Outfielder | |
| 1988 | Moon Hye-soo | Haitai Tigers | Pitcher | |
| 1989 | Park Chul-woo | Haitai Tigers | Infielder | |
| 1990 | Kim Yong-soo | LG Twins | Pitcher | |
| 1991 | Jang Chae-geun | Haitai Tigers | Catcher | |
| 1992 | Park Dong-hee | Lotte Giants | Pitcher | |
| 1993 | Lee Jong-beom | Haitai Tigers | Infielder | |
| 1994 | Kim Yong-soo | LG Twins | Pitcher | |
| 1995 | Kim Min-ho | OB Bears | Infielder | |
| 1996 | Lee Kang-chul | Haitai Tigers | Pitcher | |
| 1997 | Lee Jong-beom | Haitai Tigers | Infielder | |
| 1998 | Chung Min-tae | Hyundai Unicorns | Pitcher | |
| 1999 | Dae-sung Koo | Hanwha Eagles | Pitcher | |
| 2000 | Tom Quinlan | Hyundai Unicorns | Infielder | |
| 2001 | Tyrone Woods | Doosan Bears | Infielder | |
| 2002 | Ma Hae-young | Samsung Lions | Outfielder | |
| 2003 | Chung Min-tae | Hyundai Unicorns | Pitcher | |
| 2004 | Cho Yong-jun | Hyundai Unicorns | Pitcher | |
| 2005 | Seung-hwan Oh | Samsung Lions | Pitcher | |
| 2006 | Park Jin-man | Samsung Lions | Infielder | |
| 2007 | Kim Jae-hyun | SK Wyverns | Outfielder | |
| 2008 | Choi Jeong | SK Wyverns | Infielder | |
| 2009 | Na Ji-wan | Kia Tigers | Outfielder | |
| 2010 | Park Jung-kwon | SK Wyverns | Outfielder | |
| 2011 | Seung-hwan Oh | Samsung Lions | Pitcher | |
| 2012 | Lee Seung-yuop | Samsung Lions | Infielder | |
| 2013 | Park Han-yi | Samsung Lions | Outfielder | |
| 2014 | Yamaico Navarro | Samsung Lions | Infielder | |
| 2015 | Jung Soo-bin | Doosan Bears | Outfielder | |
| 2016 | Yang Eui-ji | Doosan Bears | Catcher | |
| 2017 | Yang Hyeon-jong | Kia Tigers | Pitcher | |
| 2018 | Han Dong-min | SK Wyverns | Outfielder | |
| 2019 | Oh Jae-il | Doosan Bears | Infielder | |
| 2020 | Yang Eui-ji | NC Dinos | Catcher | |
| 2021 | Park Kyung-su | KT Wiz | Infielder | |
| 2022 | Kim Kang-min | SSG Landers | Center fielder | |
| 2023 | Oh Ji-hwan | LG Twins | Shortstop | |
| 2024 | Kim Sun-bin | Kia Tigers | Infielder | |
| 2025 | Kim Hyun-soo | LG Twins | Outfielder | |
| 2026 | Koo Ja-wook | Samsung Lions | Outfielder | |

== See also ==
- Japan Series Most Valuable Player Award
- World Series Most Valuable Player Award
