= Byung-ho Park =

South Korean former baseball player (born 1986)

Byung-ho Park 박병호
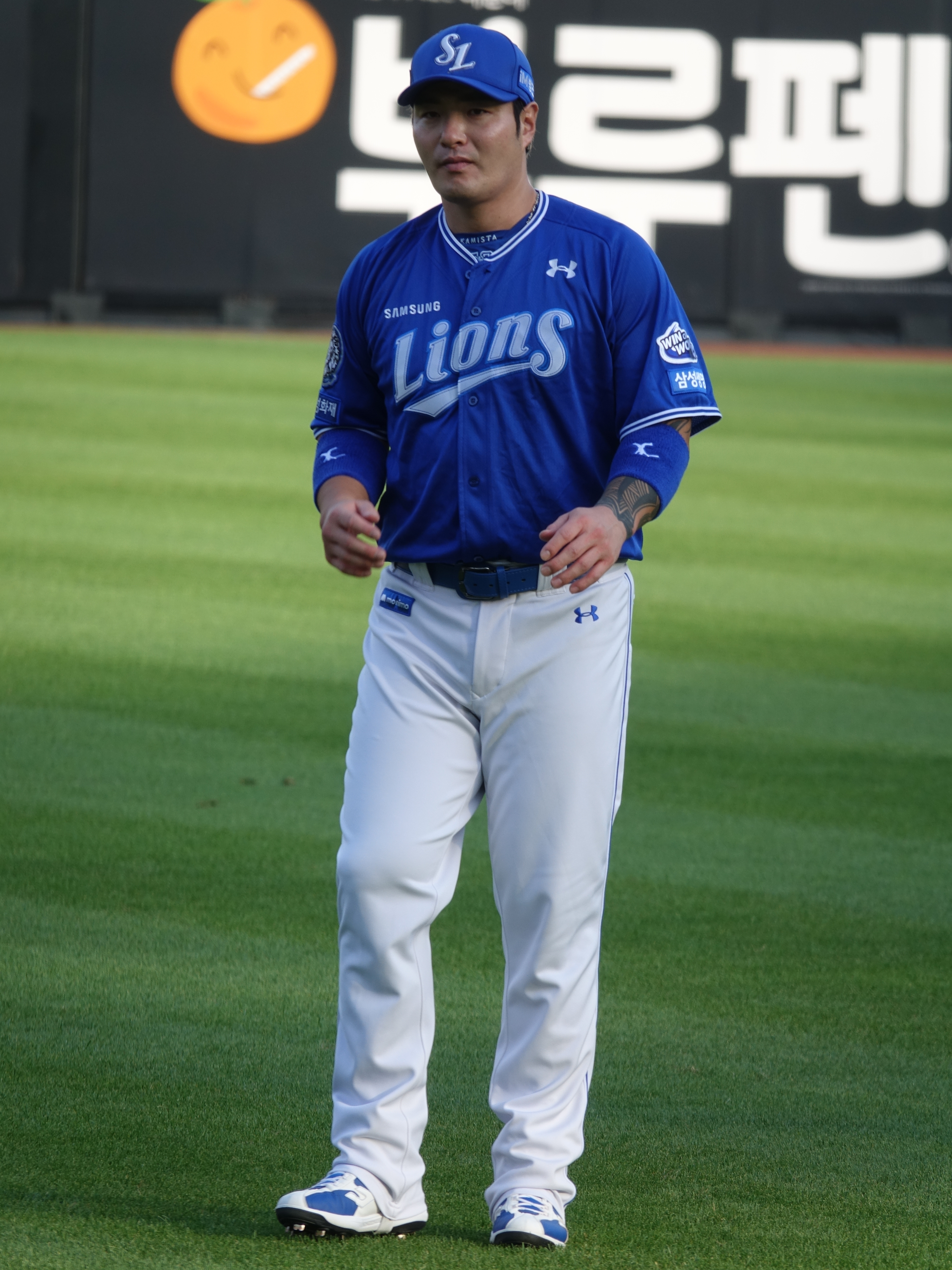
- Park with the Samsung Lions in 2025

Kiwoom Heroes – No. 59
- Designated hitter / First baseman
- Born: July 10, 1986 (age 40); Seoul, South Korea
- Bats: Right Throws: Right

Professional debut
- KBO: April 2, 2005, for the LG Twins
- MLB: April 4, 2016, for the Minnesota Twins

KBO statistics (through August 3, 2025)
- Batting average: .273
- Home runs: 418
- Runs batted in: 1,244

MLB statistics (through 2016 season)
- Batting average: .191
- Home runs: 12
- Runs batted in: 24
- Stats at Baseball Reference

Teams
- LG Twins (2005–2006, 2009–2011); Nexen Heroes (2011–2015); Minnesota Twins (2016); Nexen/Kiwoom Heroes (2018–2021); KT Wiz (2022–2024); Samsung Lions (2024–2025)

Career highlights and awards
- 2× KBO MVP (2012, 2013); 6× KBO Golden Glove Award (2012–14, 2018–19, 2022); 6× KBO home run leader (2012–15, 2019, 2022); 4× KBO RBI leader (2012–15); 2× KBO slugging percentage leader (2012, 2013); KBO All-Star Game MVP (2014)
Medals
Men's baseball
Representing South Korea
Asian Games
Gold medal – first place	2014 Incheon	Team
2015 WBSC Premier12
Gold medal – first place	2015 Japan/Taiwan	Team

- Byung-ho Park
- Hangul: 박병호
- Hanja: 朴炳鎬
- RR: Bak Byeongho
- MR: Pak Pyŏngho

Byungho Park (Korean: 박병호; Hanja: 朴炳鎬; Korean pronunciation: [pak̚.p͈jʌŋ.ɦo]; born July 10, 1986) is a South Korean former professional baseball player. He played for the LG Twins, Kiwoom Heroes, and KT Wiz of KBO League, and Minnesota Twins of Major League Baseball. In the KBO, Park had two consecutive seasons with 50 home runs (2014–2015) and was the home run title winner for four consecutive seasons (2012–2015). He holds the KBO record for runs batted in during a single season, with 146 RBI in 2015.

== Amateur career ==
Park attended Sungnam High School in Seoul. Park first gained attention at the 38th President's Cup National High School Baseball Championship, where he became the first high school player to hit four home runs in four consecutive plate appearances on April 29 and May 1, 2004. In June 2004, Park led his team to win the 59th Blue Dragon Flag National High School Baseball Championship, ranked first in runs with 10.

In August 2004, Park was selected for the South Korean under-18 national team and participated in the World Junior Baseball Championship held in Taiwan. There he helped the team clinch bronze, leading the team's attack alongside future KBO League stars Kang Jung-ho and Choi Jeong.

== Professional career ==
=== LG Twins ===
Park was selected by the LG Twins in the first round of the 2005 KBO First-Year Player Draft. He entered the league with high expectations, converting his position from catcher to first baseman in his first season. However, Park batted only .190 with only 3 home runs and 21 RBIs in 79 games. In 2006, he batted .162 with 5 home runs, spending most of the season in the minors. After the 2006 season, Park joined the Korea Armed Forces Athletic Corps Baseball Team to serve a two-year military service.

Although he came back to the Twins after being discharged from the military duty in early 2009, Park continued to hit below the Mendoza Line (.218 in 2009 and .188 in 2010), mostly serving as the backup to first baseman Lee Taek-keun.

=== Nexen Heroes ===
On July 31, 2011, Park was traded to the Nexen Heroes along with Shim Soo-chang for Kim Seong-hyun and Song Sin-yeong.

In 2012, Park hit 31 home runs with 105 RBIs, and led the league in slugging percentage (.561). He also won the 2012 KBO League Most Valuable Player Award and the Golden Glove Award at first base.

Park showed improved performances in the 2013 season. He hit 37 home runs, slugging percentage (.602), 117 RBIs and scored 91 runs in 2013. He also played all 128 regular-season games as the team's starting first baseman and cleanup hitter. He was selected as an All-Star, won the 2013 KBO League MVP and Gold Glove Award at first base. In the last semi-playoff game against the Doosan Bears, Park hit a three-run home run against Doosan Bears pitcher Dustin Nippert to even up the score from 0–3 to 3–3 with two outs in the bottom of the 9th inning.

During the 2014 season, he batted .303 with 52 homers and 146 RBIs in 124 games with Nexen in the KBO. His 2015 season with the Heroes was even more impressive, as he batted .343 with 53 home runs, and he set a KBO record for runs batted in with 146.

=== Minnesota Twins ===
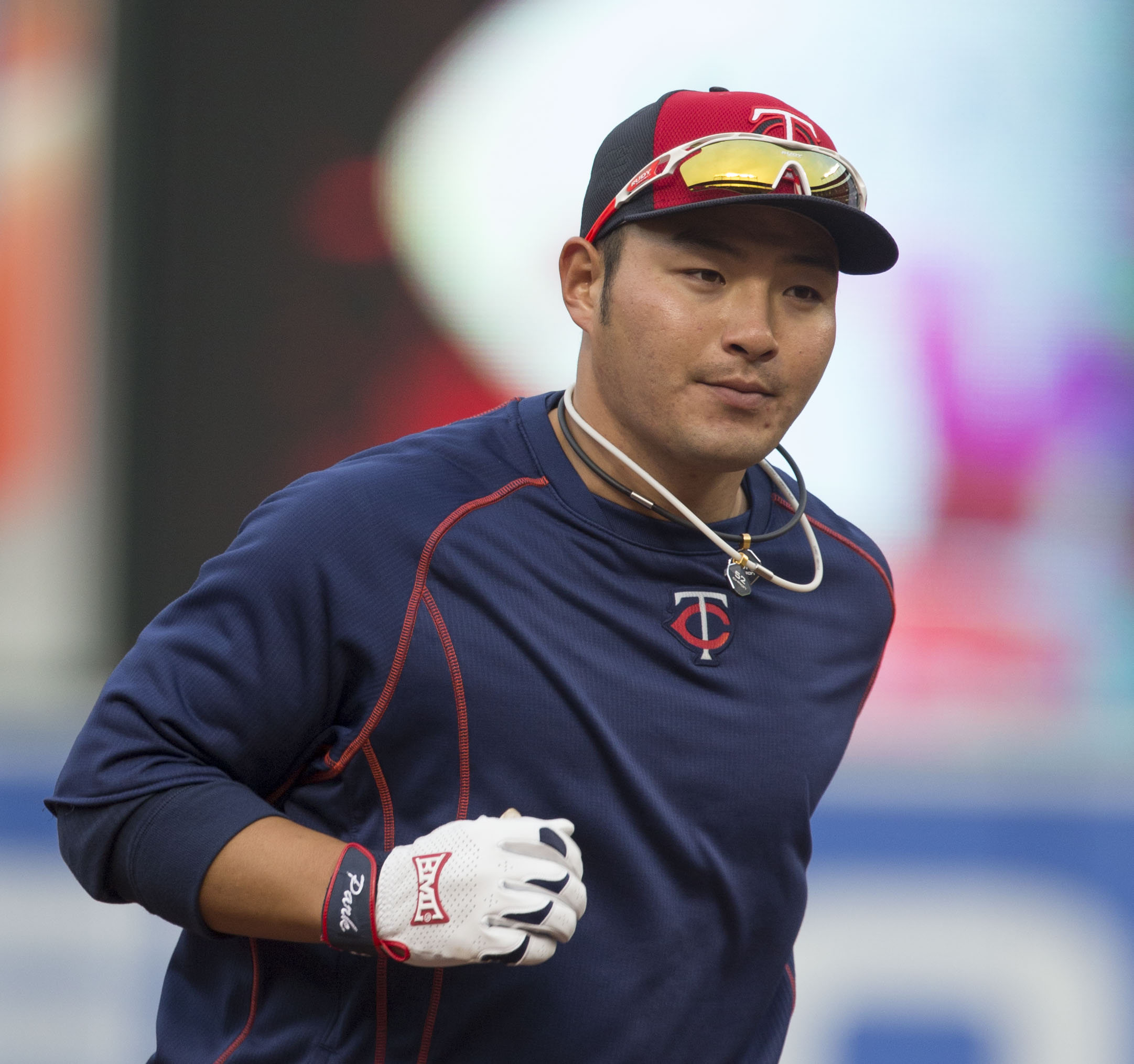
Park during his tenure with the Minnesota Twins in 2016

The Minnesota Twins of Major League Baseball won the rights to negotiate with Park during the 2015–16 offseason after placing a $12.85 million bid through the posting system. On December 1, 2015, Park signed a four-year, $12 million contract with the Twins.

On April 8, 2016, Park hit his first MLB home run off of Joakim Soria in a game against the Kansas City Royals. After batting .191 in 62 games for the Twins, he was optioned to the Rochester Red Wings of the Triple-A International League and was never called back up. Park was designated for assignment on February 3, 2017, to make room for Matt Belisle on the roster. On March 30, Park cleared waivers and was sent outright to Triple-A Rochester, and was subsequently reassigned to Minor League camp as well. He spent the entire 2017 season in the minors, and hit .253 with 14 home runs and 60 RBI in 111 games. During the offseason, Park asked to be released by the Twins organization in order to return to the KBO League.

=== Nexen Heroes (second stint) ===
On November 26, 2017, Park signed a one-year, $1.4 million contract to return to the Nexen Heroes. He became a free agent following the 2021 season.

=== KT Wiz ===
On December 28, 2021, Park signed a three-year contract with the KT Wiz.

=== Samsung Lions ===
On May 28, 2024, Park was traded to the Samsung Lions in exchange for Oh Jae-il. On November 3, 2025, he announced retirement.

== International career ==
He represented South Korea at the 2014 Asian Games, 2015 WBSC Premier12 and 2018 Asian Games.

Year	Venue	Competition	Team
2004	Chinese Taipei	World Junior Baseball Championship	Bronze medal

== See also ==
- List of KBO career home run leaders
- List of KBO career RBI leaders
