= Kim Jin-wook =

South Korean baseball player

- Pitcher / Manager
- Born: August 5, 1960 (age 65); Yeongcheon, North Gyeongsang
- Batted: Right Threw: Right

KBO debut
- 1984, for the OB Bears

Last appearance
- 1993, for the Ssangbangwool Raiders

KBO statistics
- Win–loss record: 53–71
- Earned run average: 3.68
- Strikeouts: 495
- Stats at Baseball Reference

Teams
- As player: OB Bears (1984–1992); Ssangbangwool Raiders (1993); As coach: Doosan Bears (2007–2011); As manager: Doosan Bears (2012–2013); KT Wiz (2017–2018)

- Kim Jin-wook
- Hangul: 김진욱
- Hanja: 金鎭旭
- RR: Gim Jinuk
- MR: Kim Chinuk

Kim Jin-wook (born August 5, 1960) is the former manager of the Doosan Bears and KT Wiz of the KBO League.
