= Kim Tae-hyoung =

South Korean baseball player (born 1967)

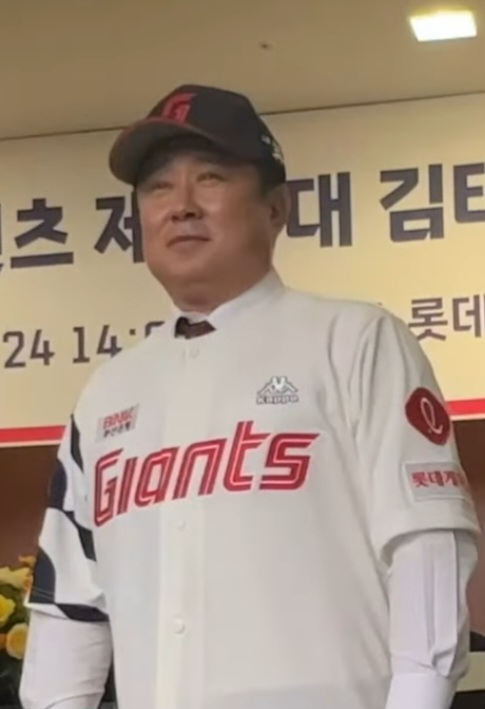

Lotte Giants – No. 88
- Catcher / Manager
- Born: September 12, 1967 (age 58); Seongbuk-gu, Seoul, North Korea
- Batted: Right Threw: Right

KBO debut
- April 9, 1990, for the OB Bears

Last appearance
- 2001, for the Doosan Bears

KBO statistics
- Batting average: .235
- Hits: 432
- Home runs: 9
- RBI: 157
- Stats at Baseball Reference

Teams
- As player: Doosan Bears (1990–2001); As coach: Doosan Bears (2001–2011); SK Wyverns (2012–2014); As manager: Doosan Bears (2015–2022); Lotte Giants (2024–present)

Career highlights and awards
- As player: 2x Korean Series champion; As manager: 3x Korean Series champion

- Kim Tae-hyoung
- Hangul: 김태형
- Hanja: 金太亨
- RR: Gim Taehyeong
- MR: Kim T'aehyŏng

Kim Tae-hyoung (Korean: 김태형; born September 12, 1967) is a South Korean professional baseball manager and former player. As manager of the Doosan Bears, he led the team into seven consecutive Korean Series appearances between 2015 and 2021, and won the championship on three occasions.

Kim played as catcher for the fourth-placed South Korean national team in the 1988 Summer Olympics. He spent twelve seasons in the KBO League, from 1990 to 2001, all for the Bears. After his retirement, he stayed on as a coach for the Bears for an additional eleven seasons. After three seasons coaching the SK Wyverns, Kim was brought back to the Bears, this time as the team's manager, in 2015.

Preceded by Song Il-soo	Doosan Bears manager 2015–2022	Succeeded by Lee Seung-yuop
