= Ryu Joong-il =

South Korean baseball player and manager

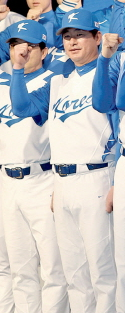
- Shortstop / Manager
- Born: April 28, 1963 (age 62); Yeongdeok, North Gyeongsang
- Batted: Right Threw: Right

KBO debut
- April 6, 1987, for the Samsung Lions

Last KBO appearance
- October 20, 1999, for the Samsung Lions

KBO statistics
- Batting average: .265
- Home runs: 45
- Runs batted in: 359
- Stats at Baseball Reference

Teams
- As player: Samsung Lions (1987–1999); As coach: Samsung Lions (2000–2010); As manager: Samsung Lions (2011–2016); LG Twins (2018–2020)

Career highlights and awards
- As manager: 4× Korean Series champion (2011, 2012, 2013, 2014)
Korean name
Hangul	류중일
Hanja	柳仲逸
RR	Ryu Jungil
MR	Ryu Chungil

Ryu Joong-il (born April 28, 1963) is a former South Korean baseball player who is currently a former manager of the LG Twins of the KBO League.

Ryu had a 30-year association with the Samsung Lions, from 1987 to 2016, starting as a player, then as a junior coach, a regular coach, and finally as the team's manager. As the Lions' manager from 2011 to 2016, he led the team to the Korean Series five straight times (2011–2015), winning the championship four times (2011, 2012, 2013, 2014) and finishing second once (2015).
