= KT Wiz =

South Korean professional baseball team

- KT 위즈

Logo	Cap insignia

Information
- League: KBO League (2015–present)
- Location: Suwon
- Ballpark: Suwon KT Wiz Park (2015–present)
- Established: January 2013; 13 years ago
- Korean Series championships: 2021
- League championships: 2021, 2026
- Colors: Black, red and white
- Mascot: Vic and Ddory
- Ownership: KT Corporation
- Manager: Lee Kang-chul
- Website: www.ktwiz.co.kr

Current uniforms

The KT Wiz (Korean: KT 위즈; stylized as kt wiz) are a South Korean professional baseball team based in Suwon. They are a member of the KBO League. Their home stadium is Suwon KT Wiz Park in Suwon.

== History ==
On 11 January 2013, the Korea Baseball Organization officially approved KT Baseball Club's admission to KBO League, beginning with the 2015 season. The Suwon KT Wiz played the 2013 season as part of the KBO Futures League's Freedom Division, and the 2014 season as part of the Futures League's Blue League division. In 2015, the team was elevated to the KBO League.

As a new KBO League team in 2015, the Wiz were allowed four foreign players on their roster each season (as opposed to the usual three). Foreign players signed by the Wiz for the 2015 season were pitchers Phil Irwin, Andrew Sisco and Chris Oxspring, and hitter Andy Marte (Sisco and Irwin were both released mid-season and replaced by Dan Black and Justin Germano, respectively). Beginning in the 2017 season, the Wiz's allowed allotment of foreign players reverted to three to match the rest of the league.

After five straight seasons without a playoff appearance, Wiz finally broke through in 2020, finishing second with an 81–62–1 record. They were eliminated by the Doosan Bears in the semifinals after four games. The following year, for the first time in franchise history, KT Wiz became regular season champions after defeating the Samsung Lions in an additional tiebreaker and advanced directly to the Korean Series. In the final, they won their first Korean Series title, sweeping the Doosan Bears in four games.

== Season-by-season records ==
Year	Rank	Regular season									Postseason	Awards
Year	Rank	Standings	Games	Wins	Losses	Draws	Win%	BA	HR	ERA	Postseason	Awards
2015	10/10		144	52	91	1	.364	.273	129	5.56	Did not qualify	
2016	10/10		144	53	89	2	.373	.276	116	5.92	Did not qualify	
2017	10/10		144	50	94	0	.347	.275	119	5.75	Did not qualify	
2018	9/10		144	59	82	3	.418	.275	206	5.34	Did not qualify	Kang Baek-ho (ROTY)
2019	6/10		144	71	71	2	.500	.277	103	4.29	Did not qualify	
2020	3/10	2/10	144	81	62	1	.566	.284	163	4.54	Lost playoff vs. Doosan Bears (1–3)	Mel Rojas Jr. (MVP); So Hyeong-jun (ROTY)
2021	1/10	1/10	144	76	59	9	.563	.265	106	3.67	Won Korean Series vs. Doosan Bears (4–0)	
2022	4/10	4/10	144	80	62	2	.563	.254	119	3.51	Won wild card vs. Kia Tigers (1–0); Lost semi-playoff vs. Kiwoom Heroes (2–3)	
2023	2/10	2/10	144	79	62	3	.560	.265	89	3.94	Won playoff vs. NC Dinos (3–2); Lost Korean Series vs. LG Twins (1–4)	
2024	5/10	5/10	144	72	70	2	.507	.279	145	5.11	Won wild card vs. Doosan Bears (2–0); Lost semi-playoff vs. LG Twins (2–3)	
2025	6/10		144	71	68	5	.511	.253	104	4.09	Did not qualify	Ahn Hyun-min (ROTY)
2026	2/10	1/10	144	90	49	5	.647	.286	121	4.14	Lost Korean Series vs. Samsung Lions (1–4)	

== Managers ==
- Cho Bum-hyun (2013–2016)
- Kim Jin-wook (2017–2018)
- Lee Kang-chul (2019–present)
