= Jamsil Baseball Stadium =

Stadium in Songpa District, Seoul

Seoul Sports Complex Baseball Stadium
- 서울종합운동장 야구장
- Jamsil (잠실)
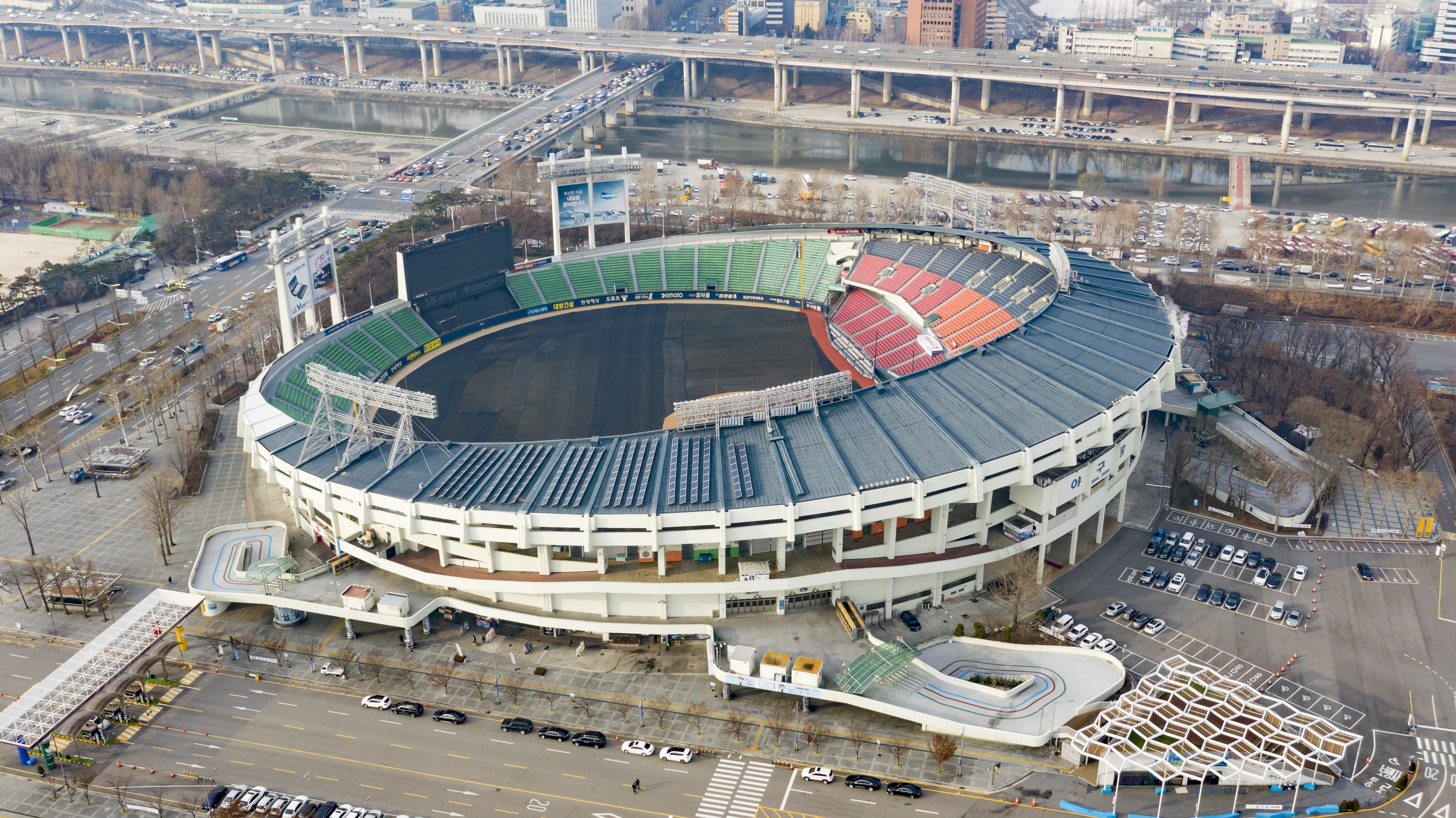
- Interactive map of Seoul Sports Complex Baseball Stadium
- Location: Jamsil 1-dong, Songpa District, Seoul
- Coordinates: 37°30′44.6″N 127°04′19.1″E
- Owner: City of Seoul
- Capacity: 23,750
- Surface: Natural grass
- Field size: Left Field – 100 metres (328 ft); Left-Center – 120 metres (394 ft); Center Field – 125 metres (410 ft); Right-Center – 120 metres (394 ft); Right Field – 100 metres (328 ft); Outfield Wall Height – 2.6 metres (9 ft)

Construction
- Groundbreaking: April 17, 1980
- Built: 1980–1982
- Opened: July 15, 1982
- Closed: 2026
- Cost: 12.6 billion won
- Architect: Kim In-ho
- General contractor: Hyundai Engineering & Construction

Tenants
- LG Twins (1982–2026); Doosan Bears (1985–2026)

Jamsil Baseball Stadium (Korean: 잠실 야구장; Hanja: 蠶室野球場), officially the Seoul Sports Complex Baseball Stadium (Korean: 서울종합운동장 야구장; Hanja: Seoul綜合運動場 野球場), is a baseball stadium located at 25 Olympic-ro, Songpa District, Seoul, South Korea. The stadium holds 23,750 people and was built from April 1980 to July 1982. It makes up the Seoul Sports Complex along with the nearby Seoul Olympic Stadium, and hosted the baseball events during the 1988 Summer Olympics.

The stadium served as the home of the LG Twins and Doosan Bears of the KBO League until 2026. The area of Jamsil Baseball Stadium is 26,331 square metres (283,420 sq ft). It has one basement level. It is three stories high with a center-field distance of 125 metres (410 ft) and side distances of 100 metres (330 ft). The stadium has 59 entrances consisting of 49 inner gates and 10 outer gates. The parking lot allows 2,200 cars to park. The stadium can be reached by Seoul Subway Line 2, Line 9, or by bus.

Jamsil Baseball Stadium was renovated in 2007 for about 1.5 billion won. Grass on the field was replaced, drains were installed, and sprinklers were upgraded to prevent heavy rain damage. After the 2012 baseball season, Seoul Metropolitan Facilities Management Corporation changed the soil of the ground for easier maintenance and prevention of injuries. They changed all seats except for the third floor, built a new locker room for the away team, and remodeled restrooms for fans. Before the 2020 season, the outfield seats were also renovated. The chairs have been replaced with folding chairs, allowing spectators sitting in the outfield seats to watch the game more comfortably.

== See also ==
- Dongdaemun Baseball Stadium
- Mokdong Baseball Stadium
- Gocheok Sky Dome
