= 2026 Korean Series =

Professional baseball championship in South Korea

- 2026 Shinhan SOL Bank Korean Series
Team (Wins)	Managers	Season
Samsung Lions (4)	Park Jin-man	83–58–3 (.589)
KT Wiz (1)	Lee Kang-chul	90–49–5 (.647)
- Dates: November 3 – November 8
- Venues: Suwon KT Wiz Park (Suwon); Daegu Samsung Lions Park (Daegu)
- MVP: Koo Ja-wook (Samsung)
- Umpires: Moon Geun-young, Kim Jeong-guk, Park Jong-cheol, Kim Seong-cheol, Jeon Il-su, Lee Ki-jung, Park Gi-taek, Park Geun-young

Broadcast
- Television: Korea; KBS (Game 1 and 4); MBC (Game 2); SBS (Game 3 and 5); SPOTV (All games); TVING (Game 1 and 4); International; SOOP (All games); KBS America (USA Only)
- TV announcers: Lee Ho-geun, Park Yong-taik and Cho Sung-hwan (KBS); Jeong Woo-young and Lee Soon-Cheol (SBS); Kim Na-jin, Jung Min-cheul and Park Jae-hong (MBC); Cho jooyoung, Oh Jae-il and Kim Minsu (SPOTV); Jung Yong-keom, Hwang Jae-gyun, Yoon Suk-min, Jeong Keun-woo and Son Ah-seop (TVING)
- Radio: TBC Dream FM; Daegu MBC Standard FM
- Radio announcers: Kim Dae-jin and Kim Yong-Kook (TBC); Seo Sang-gook, Chae Tae-in and Song Min-gu (Daegu MBC)

The 2026 Korean Series, (known as the 2026 Shinhan SOL Bank Korean Series for sponsorship reasons) was the championship series of the KBO League for the 2026 season. The 45th Korean Series, it featured the KT Wiz and Samsung Lions. The KT Wiz, who won the pennant race, received a bye into the Series for the first time since 2021. The second-place Samsung Lions defeated the Kia Tigers in the playoff 3-2 to advance to the Korean Series.

The Lions won their ninth Korean Series title, beating the Wiz 4–1.

== Roster ==
KT Wiz

2026 KT Wiz
Roster
Pitchers: 1 Ko Young-pyo; 11 Sugimoto Koki; 12 Woo Kyu-min; 19 Bae Je-seong; 29 Jeon Yong-ju; 30 So Hyeong-jun; 36 Davis Daniel; 38 Ju Kwon; 41 Son Dong-hyun; 43 Logan Allen; 47 Oh Won-seok; 60 Park Yeong-hyun; 61 Kim Jung-woon	Catchers: 22 Jang Sung-woo; 42 Cho Dae-hyun; 45 Han Seung-taek; Infielders: 4 Oh Yoon-suk; 7 Kim Sang-su; 9 Ryu Hyun-in; 13 Hur Kyoung-min; 34 Sam Hilliard; 52 Kwon Dong-jin; 56 Jang Jun-won	Outfielders: 3 Choi Won-jun; 10 Kim Hyun-soo; 23 Ahn Hyun-min; 27 Bae Jung-dae; 33 Lee Jeong-hun; 51 Jang Jin-hyuk; 53 Kim Min-hyuck	Manager: 71 Lee Kang-chul; Coaches: 72 Kim Kang; 73 Park Kyung-su; 75 Jang Jae-joong; 76 Park Ki-hyuck; 77 Kim Tae-han; 78 Kim Ho; 81 Yoo Han-joon; 82 Je Chun-mo; 84 Choi Man-ho; 87 Jun Byung-doo

Samsung Lions

2026 Samsung Lions
Roster
Pitchers: 17 Lee Jae-hee; 18 Won Tae-in; 20 Choi Won-tae; 26 Lee Seung-hyun; 27 Kim Tae-hun; 28 Lee Seung-min; 38 Im Gi-yeong; 42 Yang Chang-seop; 55 Bae Chan-seung; 59 Chris Paddack; 60 Jang Chan-hee; 74 Miyamori Satoshi; 75 Ariel Jurado	Catchers: 24 Kim Do-hwan; 46 Jang Seung-hyun; 47 Kang Min-ho; Infielders: 0 Lewin Díaz; 7 Lee Jae-hyeon; 9 Park Gye-beom; 16 Ryu Ji-hyuk; 30 Kim Young-woong; 56 Kim Sangjun; 61 Jeon Byeongwoo	Outfielders: 5 Koo Ja-wook; 32 Kim Hun-gon; 34 Choi Hyoung-woo; 39 Kim Seong-yoon; 44 Kim Hyun-Joon; 58 Kim Ji-chan; 66 Park Seung-kyu	Manager: 70 Park Jin-man; Coaches: 33 Park Han-yi; 76 Son Jooin; 78 Lee Heung-ryun; 81 Choi Il-eon; 85 Takayuki Murakami; 89 Park Seok-jin; 92 Jung Byeong-gon; 93 Lee Jong-wook; 98 Chae Sang-byung

== Summary ==
All game times are in Korean Standard Time.
Samsung won the series, 4-1.

Game	Date	Score	Location	Time	Attendance
1	November 3	Samsung Lions – 7, KT Wiz – 8	Suwon KT Wiz Park	3:36	17,700
2	November 4	Samsung Lions – 3, KT Wiz – 2	Suwon KT Wiz Park	4:21	17,700
3	November 6	KT Wiz – 1, Samsung Lions – 5	Daegu Samsung Lions Park	2:48	23,550
4	November 7	KT Wiz – 5, Samsung Lions – 10	Daegu Samsung Lions Park	3:17	23,550
5	November 8	KT Wiz – 1, Samsung Lions – 12	Daegu Samsung Lions Park	3:02	23,550

== Matchups and linescores ==
=== Game 1 ===
November 3, 2026 18:30 KST at Suwon KT Wiz Park
Team	1	2	3	4	5	6	7	8	9	R	H	E
Samsung Lions	0	0	0	0	0	0	5	2	0	7	10	1
KT Wiz	3	0	2	0	1	2	0	0	X	8	10	0
Starting pitchers: Samsung: Choi Won-tae; KT: Davis Daniel; WP: Davis Daniel (1–0) LP: Choi Won-tae (0–1) Sv: Park Yeong-hyun (1); Home runs: Samsung: Koo Ja-wook (1); KT: Ahn Hyun-min (1), Han Seung Taek (1), Kim Hyun-soo (1); Attendance: 17,700; Umpires: Moon Geun-young, Kim Jeong-guk, Park Jong-cheol, Kim Seong-cheol, Jeon Il-su, Lee Ki-jung; Boxscore

=== Game 2 ===
November 4, 2026 18:30 KST at Suwon KT Wiz Park
Team	1	2	3	4	5	6	7	8	9	10	11	12	R	H	E
Samsung Lions	0	1	0	0	0	0	0	0	0	1	0	1	3	14	2
KT Wiz	0	0	0	1	0	0	0	0	0	1	0	0	2	11	1
Starting pitchers: Samsung: Chris Paddack; KT: Ko Young-pyo; WP: Kim Tae-hun (1–0) LP: Oh Won-seok (0–1) Sv: Bae Chan-seung (1); Home runs: Samsung: None; KT: None; Attendance: 17,700; Umpires: Lee Ki-jung , Kim Seong-cheol, Kim Jeong-guk, Jeon Il-su, Park Gi-taek, Park Jong-cheol; Boxscore

=== Game 3 ===
November 6, 2026 18:30 KST at Daegu Samsung Lions Park
Team	1	2	3	4	5	6	7	8	9	R	H	E
KT Wiz	1	0	0	0	0	0	0	0	0	1	7	0
Samsung Lions	1	3	0	0	0	0	0	1	X	5	4	0
Starting pitchers: KT: So Hyeong-jun; Samsung: Ariel Jurado; WP: Ariel Jurado (1–0) LP: So Hyeong-jun (0–1); Home runs: KT: None; Samsung: Park Seung-kyu (1); Attendance: 23,550; Umpires: Park Jong-cheol, Jeon Il-su, Kim Seong-cheol, Park Gi-taek, Park Geun-young, Kim Jeong-guk; Boxscore

=== Game 4 ===
November 7, 2026 14:00 KST at Daegu Samsung Lions Park
Team	1	2	3	4	5	6	7	8	9	R	H	E
KT Wiz	1	0	0	0	3	0	0	1	0	5	4	0
Samsung Lions	6	0	1	0	2	0	1	0	X	10	11	0
Starting pitchers: KT: Logan Allen; Samsung: Jang Chan-hee; WP: Lee Jae-Hee (1–0) LP: Logan Allen (0–1); Home runs: KT: Jang Jin-hyuk (1), Kim Min-hyuck (1); Samsung: None; Attendance: 23,550; Umpires: Kim Jeong-guk , Park Gi-taek , Jeon Il-su , Park Geun-young , Lee Gi-jung , Kim Seong-cheol; Boxscore

=== Game 5 ===
November 8, 2026 14:00 KST at Daegu Samsung Lions Park
Team	1	2	3	4	5	6	7	8	9	R	H	E
KT Wiz	0	0	1	0	0	0	0	0		1	4	2
Samsung Lions	0	0	3	0	8	0	0	1	X	12	14	0
Starting pitchers: KT: Davis Daniel; Samsung: Won Tae-in; WP: Won Tae-in (1–0) LP: Ko Young-pyo (0–1) Sv: Chris Paddack (1); Home runs: KT: None; Samsung: None; Attendance: 23,550; Umpires: Kim Seong-cheol, Park Geun-young, Park Gi-taek, Lee Ki-jung, Park Jong-cheol, Jeon Il-su; Boxscore

== See also ==
- 2026 Japan Series
- 2026 World Series
