= 2026 KBO League season =

Professional baseball season in South Korea

2026 KBO League
- 2026 신한 SOL Bank KBO 리그
- Association: KBO
- League: KBO League
- Sport: Baseball
- Defending champions: LG Twins (2025)
- Hosts: Shinhan Bank
- Duration: March 28 – October 12
- Games: 144 per team
- Teams: 10
- Total attendance: 12,770,551
- Average attendance: 17,737
- TV partner(s): KBS, MBC, SBS & SPOTV
- Streaming partner(s): TVING (South Korea); SOOP (International)

Regular Season
- Season champions: KT Wiz | 90–49–5 (.647)
- Second place: Samsung Lions | 83–58–3 (.589)
- Third place: Kia Tigers | 79–63–2 (.556)
- Fourth place: LG Twins | 78–65–1 (.545)
- Fifth place: Doosan Bears | 73–66–5 (.525)

Preseason
- First place: Lotte Giants
- Runners-up: Doosan Bears

All-Star Game
- 2026 KBO All-Stars: Nanum All-Stars
- Runners-up: Dream All-Stars
- Season MVP: Heo In-seo (Hanwha)

Postseason
- Wild Card champions: LG Twins
- Wild Card runners-up: Doosan Bears
- Semi-playoff champions: Kia Tigers
- Semi-playoff runners-up: LG Twins
- Playoff champions: Samsung Lions
- Playoff runners-up: Kia Tigers

Korean Series
- Date: November 3 - November 8
- Venue: Suwon KT Wiz Park (Suwon); Daegu Samsung Lions Park (Daegu)
- Champions: Samsung Lions (9th title)
- Runners-up: KT Wiz
- Finals MVP: Koo Ja-wook (Samsung)

KBO League seasons
- ← 2025 2027 →

The 2026 KBO League season, officially known as the 2026 Shinhan SOL Bank KBO League (Korean: 2026 신한 SOL Bank KBO 리그) for sponsorship reasons, was a professional baseball season based in South Korea; the 45th in the history of the KBO League. The league's format and makeup did not change in the 2026 season from the previous season, with the same 10 teams competing; the Kia Tigers, Doosan Bears, Lotte Giants, NC Dinos, LG Twins, Hanwha Eagles, KT Wiz, Samsung Lions, SSG Landers, and Kiwoom Heroes.

The Twins entered the season as the defending champions from the 2025 season.

== Rules ==
The Korea Baseball Organization announced rule changes for the 2026 season. Teams were able to add an Asian or Australian import player to their roster alongside three foreigners. That player must have competed in Asia or in Australia in the 2025 season. KBO teams could not spend more than $200,000 in those players including salary, signing bonus and buyout fee paid to the former team.

The league made changes to the pitch clock; 18 seconds are given with bases empty and 23 seconds will be given with (a) base(s) occupied.

== Offseason ==
Shinhan Bank has agreed to serve as the title sponsor of the KBO League, until at least 2037. It is the country's largest sports sponsorship deal to date. Shinhan Bank will pay KR₩ 15 billion (US$ 77.7 million) to keep the designation during the 2028–2037 league season. Shinhan Bank has agreed to assist both the national and youth baseball teams as part of the agreement.

On December 22, 2025, Song Sung-mun (3B) of the Heroes signed a four-year, $15 million deal with the San Diego Padres of Major League Baseball. Song will receive an additional $1 million signing bonus in two installments. Song's deal includes a $4 million player option for 2029 and a $7 million mutual option for 2030 with a $1 million buyout.

On February 23, 2026 KBO announced a statement regarding four Giants players (Ko Seung-min, Kim Dong-hyeok, Kim Se-min, and Na Seung-yeop). They allegedly visited a gambling arcade during spring training in Taiwan. According to the statement, the disciplinary committee confirmed that Kim Dong-hyeok had visited the location three times since last year and was therefore suspended for 50 games. Ko Seung-min, Kim Se-min, and Na Seung-yeop who were each confirmed to have visited once were suspended for 30 games.

On the same day, the Eagles signed Roh Si-hwan (3B) to an 11-year extension worth up to KR₩ 30.7 billion (US$ 21.3 million) including an option and release clause allowing him to move to the MLB via the posting system after 2026. This contract is the longest and most expensive deal in KBO history.

On August 6, 2026, the KBO has cancelled all games through Sunday to protect players and spectators from an extreme heatwave in South Korea. It will resume on the next Tuesday from the decision between the KBO and the general manager of 10 KBO clubs earlier in this day, which follows growing calls for a stronger heat wave after a spectator collapsed from a suspected heat-related illness at Incheon SSG Landers Field in Incheon on Tuesday. The KBO also pushed back the starting games, including weekend matches, to 7 p.m. for the time being. Games time previously started at 6:30 p.m. on weekdays. and 6 p.m. on weekends. After that, which will continue time starting at 7 p.m. on weekdays and 6 p.m. on Saturdays; Sunday games may begin at 2 p.m. depending on the television broadcast schedule.

== Spring Training ==
All KBO teams took part in Spring Training games in Taiwan, Japan and the United States. Teams played against CPBL, NPB, and MLB teams.

Practice Match	February 13	Hanwha Eagles	2–6	Melbourne Aces	Melbourne Ballpark; Victoria, Australia
Practice Match	19:00 AEDT

Practice Match	February 14	Melbourne Aces	4–1	Hanwha Eagles	Melbourne Ballpark; Victoria, Australia
Practice Match	19:00 AEDT

Practice Match	February 14	TSG Hawks	3–6	Lotte Giants	Asia-Pacific International Baseball Training Centers; Tainan, Taiwan
Practice Match	13:00 CST

Practice Match	February 15	Hanwha Eagles	4–4	Melbourne Aces	Melbourne Ballpark; Victoria, Australia
Practice Match	19:00 AEDT

Practice Match	February 15	TSG Hawks	4–11	Lotte Giants	Asia-Pacific International Baseball Training Centers; Tainan, Taiwan
Practice Match	13:00 CST

Practice Match	February 16	Melbourne Aces	7–8	KT Wiz	Melbourne Ballpark; Victoria, Australia
Practice Match	19:00 AEDT

Practice Match	February 20	KT Wiz	6–12	Melbourne Aces	Melbourne Ballpark; Victoria, Australia
Practice Match	19:00 AEDT

Practice Match	February 21	KT Wiz	0–4	Melbourne Aces	Melbourne Ballpark; Victoria, Australia
Practice Match	19:00 AEDT

Practice Match; Played in 7 innings	February 22	Hanwha Eagles	0–18	Chiba Lotte Marines	Itoman City Nishizaki Baseball Field; Itowan, Japan
Practice Match; Played in 7 innings	12:30 JST

Practice Match	February 22	Lotte Giants	3–3	Saitama Seibu Lions	Nango Stadium; Nichinan, Japan
Practice Match	13:00 JST

Practice Match	February 23	Lotte Giants	2–11	Yomiuri Giants 2nd team	Sun Marine Stadium; Miyazaki, Japan
Practice Match	12:30 JST

Practice Match	February 24	Hanwha Eagles	8–5	Samsung Lions	ONNA Akama Ball Park; Onna, Japan
Practice Match	13:00 JST

Practice Match	February 25	SSG Landers	1–9	Fukuoka SoftBank Hawks 2nd team	Ivy Stadium; Miyazaki, Japan
Practice Match	13:00 JST

Practice Match	February 25	Doosan Bears	3–6	Saitama Seibu Lions	Sun Marine Stadium; Miyazaki, Japan
Practice Match	13:00 JST

Practice Match	February 26	Hanwha Eagles	3–1	Hokkaido Nippon-Ham Fighters 2nd team	Enagic Stadium Nago; Nago, Japan
Practice Match	13:00 JST

Practice Match	February 26	Kiwoom Heroes	3–3	TSG Hawks	Chengcing Lake Baseball Stadium; Kaoshiung, Taiwan
Practice Match	15:00 CST

Practice Match	February 26	Lotte Giants	Rained out	Doosan Bears	Sun Marine Stadium; Miyazaki, Japan
Practice Match	13:00 JST

Practice Match	February 27	Hanwha Eagles	Rained out	Yomiuri Giants	Okinawa Cellular Stadium Naha; Naha, Japan
Practice Match	13:00 JST

Practice Match	February 27	Lotte Giants	Rained out	Orix Buffaloes	SOKKEN Stadium; Miyazaki, Japan
Practice Match	12:00 JST

Practice Match	February 27	Doosan Bears	Rained out	Chiba Lotte Marines	Miyakonojo Municipal Baseball Field; Miyakonojo, Japan
Practice Match	13:00 JST

Practice Match	February 27	Kiwoom Heroes	2–5	TSG Hawks	Chengcing Lake Baseball Stadium; Kaoshiung, Taiwan
Practice Match	18:00 CST

Practice Match	February 28	SSG Landers	13–4	Tohoku Rakuten Golden Eagles 2nd team	Okuragahama Sogo Park; Miyazaki, Japan
Practice Match	13:00 JST

Practice Match; Played in 11 innings	February 28	Samsung Lions	2–4	Yomiuri Giants	Okinawa Cellular Stadium Naha; Naha, Japan
Practice Match; Played in 11 innings	13:00 JST

Practice Match	February 28	NC Dinos	8–8	San Diego Padres	Peoria, Illinois, United States
Practice Match	13:00 CST

Practice Match	March 1	Hanwha Eagles	5–0	Kia Tigers	Kin Town Baseball Stadium; Kin, Japan
Practice Match	13:00 JST

Practice Match	March 1	LG Twins	7–7	KT Wiz	Ginoza Stadium; Ginoza, Japan
Practice Match	13:00 JST

Practice Match	March 1	Lotte Giants	4–3	Chiba Lotte Marines	Miyakonojo Municipal Baseball Field; Miyakonojo, Japan
Practice Match	12:30 JST

Practice Match	March 1	Kiwoom Heroes	6–14	TSG Hawks	Chengcing Lake Baseball Stadium; Kaoshiung, Taiwan
Practice Match	14:00 CST

Practice Match	March 1	NC Dinos	0–9	Chicago White Sox	Glendale, California, United States
Practice Match	11:00 PST

Practice Match	March 2	Hanwha Eagles	6–4	KT Wiz	Gushikawa Baseball Field; Gushikawa, Japan
Practice Match	13:00 JST

Practice Match	March 2	Lotte Giants	Rained out	SSG Landers	Nishikihara Baseball Stadium; Miyazaki, Japan
Practice Match	13:00 JST

Practice Match	March 2	Samsung Lions	3–8	Kia Tigers	ONNA Akama Ball Park; Onna, Japan
Practice Match	13:00 JST

Practice Match	March 3	Hanwha Eagles	11–7	Samsung Lions	ONNA Akama Ball Park; Onna, Japan
Practice Match	13:00 JST

Practice Match	March 3	Lotte Giants	5–10	SSG Landers	Nishikihara Baseball Stadium; Miyazaki, Japan
Practice Match	13:00 JST

Practice Match	March 3	Miyazaki Sunshine	0–15	Doosan Bears	Hisamine Ballpark; Miyazaki, Japan
Practice Match	13:00 JST

Practice Match	March 3	Kiwoom Heroes	Rained out	CTBC Brothers	Pingtung CTBC Charity Park; Pingtung, Taiwan

Practice Match; Played in 10 innings	March 3	NC Dinos	1–6	Los Angeles Dodgers	Glendale, California, United States
Practice Match; Played in 10 innings	13:00 PST

Practice Match; Played in 7 innings	March 5	LG Twins	4–8	Samsung Lions	ONNA Akama Ball Park; Onna, Japan
Practice Match; Played in 7 innings	13:00 JST

Practice Match	March 5	Doosan Bears	5–1	SSG Landers	Sun Marine Stadium; Miyazaki, Japan
Practice Match	13:00 JST

Practice Match	March 5	KT Wiz	5–2	Kia Tigers	Kin Town Baseball Stadium; Kin, Japan

Practice Match	March 5	Kiwoom Heroes	4–10	CTBC Brothers	Pingtung CTBC Charity Park; Pingtung, Taiwan

Practice Match	March 6	LG Twins	6–9	Kia Tigers	Kin Town Baseball Stadium; Kin, Japan
Practice Match	13:00 JST

Practice Match	March 6	SSG Landers	5–2	Doosan Bears	Sun Marine Stadium; Miyazaki, Japan
Practice Match	13:00 JST

Practice Match	March 6	Kiwoom Heroes	3–5	CTBC Brothers	Pingtung CTBC Charity Park; Pingtung, Taiwan

Practice Match	March 7	KT Wiz	9–2	Samsung Lions	ONNA Akama Ball Park; Onna, Japan
Practice Match	13:00 JST

=== Pre-WBC exhibition games ===
The South Korean national team played exhibition games in Okinawa, Japan with some KBO teams to prepare for the 2026 World Baseball Classic.

Exhibition; Played in 7 innings	February 20	South Korea	3–4	Samsung Lions	ONNA Akama Ball Park; Onna, Japan
Exhibition; Played in 7 innings	13:00 JST

Exhibition; Played in 7 innings	February 21	South Korea	5–2	Hanwha Eagles	Kochinda Sports Park Baseball Field; Kochinda, Japan
Exhibition; Played in 7 innings	12:00 JST

Exhibition; Played in 7 innings	February 23	South Korea	7–4	Hanwha Eagles	Kadena Baseball Stadium; Kadena, Japan
Exhibition; Played in 7 innings	13:00 JST

Exhibition; Played in 7 innings	February 24	Kia Tigers	3–6	South Korea	Kadena Baseball Stadium; Kadena, Japan
Exhibition; Played in 7 innings	13:00 JST

Exhibition	February 26	Samsung Lions	6-16	South Korea	Kadena Baseball Stadium; Kadena, Japan
Exhibition	13:00 JST

Exhibition	February 27	KT Wiz	Rained out	South Korea	Kadena Baseball Stadium; Kadena, Japan
Exhibition	13:00 JST

The Chinese Taipei national team played the Heroes to prepare for the WBC and was held in Taipei, Taiwan.

Exhibition; CPBL Squads (Including non-roster invitees)	February 21	Kiwoom Heroes	2–2	Chinese Taipei	Taipei Dome; Taipei, Taiwan

Exhibition; CPBL Squads (Including non-roster invitees)	February 22	Chinese Taipei	2–7	Kiwoom Heroes	Taipei Dome; Taipei, Taiwan

== Preseason ==
These are the final preseason standings.

The preseason started on March 12 and ended on March 24.

Preseason standings
Rank	Team	GP	W	L	D	PCT	GB	STRK	Home	Road
1	Lotte Giants	12	8	2	2	.800	—	L1	7–2–1	1–0–1
2	Doosan Bears	12	7	4	1	.636	1.5	L1	3–1–2	4–0–2
3	Hanwha Eagles	12	6	6	0	.500	3	W2	6–0–4	0–0–2
3	Samsung Lions	12	6	6	0	.500	3	L1	2–0–2	4–0–4
3	KT Wiz	12	5	5	2	.500	3	W1	5–0–3	0–2–2
6	LG Twins	12	5	6	1	.455	3.5	L2	0–0–2	5–1–4
6	Kiwoom Heroes	12	5	6	1	.455	3.5	W2	0–0–0	5–1–6
8	SSG Landers	12	5	7	0	.417	4	W1	3–0–5	2–0–2
9	Kia Tigers	12	4	6	2	.400	4	W1	2–1–1	2–1–5
10	NC Dinos	12	4	7	1	.364	4.5	L4	4–1–3	0–0–4

== Regular season ==
The regular season began on March 28 and will end on October 12. Like previous seasons, each team will play 144 games, facing every other team 16 times. Games are played every day except Mondays.

=== Standings ===
These are the final 2026 KBO League regular season standings.

Regular season standings
Rank	Team	GP	W	L	D	PCT	GB	STRK	Home			Road			Postseason
1	KT Wiz	144	90	49	5	.647	—	W10	45	2	24	45	3	25	Korean Series
2	Samsung Lions	144	83	58	3	.589	8	L4	43	1	29	40	2	29	Playoff
3	Kia Tigers	144	79	63	2	.556	12.5	W1	42	2	29	37	0	34	Semi-playoff
4	LG Twins	144	78	65	1	.545	14	L1	42	0	31	36	1	34	Wild Card
5	Doosan Bears	144	73	66	5	.525	17	L2	40	3	28	33	2	38	Wild Card
6	SSG Landers	144	65	74	5	.468	25	L1	34	4	33	31	1	41	Did not qualify
7	Lotte Giants	144	64	77	3	.454	27	W2	29	0	42	35	3	35	Did not qualify
8	NC Dinos	144	64	78	2	.451	27.5	W1	32	0	41	32	2	37	Did not qualify
9	Hanwha Eagles	144	57	83	4	.407	33.5	L2	27	3	41	30	1	42	Did not qualify
10	Kiwoom Heroes	144	50	90	4	.357	40.5	W1	28	2	43	22	2	47	Did not qualify

Note: Draw results are ignored by the league when calculating win percentage and games behind.

Note: All dates and times are in KST (Korea Standard Time).

== All-Star Game ==
Like in previous all-star games, the ten KBO teams are divided into two All-Star teams: the Nanum All-Stars (나눔) and the Dream All-Stars (드림). The all-star game will be hosted at Jamsil Baseball Stadium on July 11. This game is the last all-star game before the demolition of the stadium.

2026 KBO All-Star Teams
Team	All-Star Team
Kia Tigers	Nanum All-Stars
LG Twins	Nanum All-Stars
Hanwha Eagles	Nanum All-Stars
NC Dinos	Nanum All-Stars
Kiwoom Heroes	Nanum All-Stars
Samsung Lions	Dream All-Stars
Doosan Bears	Dream All-Stars
KT Wiz	Dream All-Stars
SSG Landers	Dream All-Stars
Lotte Giants	Dream All-Stars

The starting players (candidates) from each team are voted by fans (70%) and KBO players (30%), which leads to a score. The players with the highest score are selected.

The most voted infielders and pitchers within their position group play in the game. The top 3 outfielders play in available positions, regardless if they are all on the same team.

The teams who appeared in the previous year's Korean Series provide their manager respectively for their all-star team.

Other players in the all-star vote may also appear later in the all-star game.

=== Home-run Derby ===
2026 KBO All-Star Game Com2uS Pro Baseball Home Run Derby was a home run hitting contest between eight batters from Korea Baseball Organization (KBO). The derby was held on July 10, 2026, at Jamsil Baseball Stadium in Seoul, South Korea, the site of the 2026 KBO All-Star Game. It have eight player from twelve player who was based on player who had hit nine or more home runs from the 2026 KBO League ranking as June 29. Among the top eight player was finally selected by the fan through KBO official website and official KBO application on between June 30 to July 2.

Com2uS Pro Baseball Home Run Derby Vote Result
Ranking	Player	Team	FV	HR	Note
TOP 8
1	Kim Do-yeong	Kia	26,731 (15%)	26	
2	Yang Eui-ji	Doosan	21,530 (12%)	11	
3	Park Jun-soon	Doosan	18,170 (10%)	9	
4	Austin Dean	LG	17,889 (10%)	27	(Note: Absent of Back Comfort)
5	Kang Baek-ho	Hanwha	16,863 (9%)	21	
6	Moon Hyun-bin	Hanwha	12,705 (7%)	9	
7	Kim Ju-won	NC	12,446 (7%)	12	
8	Heo In-seo	Hanwha	12,318 (7%)	11	
Eliminated TOP 8
9	Choi Jeong	SSG	11,990 (7%)	18	
10	Choi Hyoung-woo	Samsung	11,449 (6%)	10	
11	Lewin Díaz	Samsung	11,441 (6%)	15	
12	Oh Tae-gon	SSG	9,330 (5%)	9	(Note: Austin Dean (LG), Replacement Player)

==== Main Match ====
The game proceeds with batting within an out count, followed by a 30-second rest, and than batting within the time limit. The batting time is one minute, and this period has been named "Comfya Fever Time". The preliminary round will proceed with batting five outs, followed by a 30-second rest and additional batting during one-minute (Comfya Fever Time). While the final will involve batting within seven outs, followed by a 30-second rest and additional batting during one-minute (Comfya Fever Time). In both the prelimary and final rounds, the winner will be by the combined total of home runs within the out count plus home runs during Fever Time.

Com2uS Pro Baseball Home Run Derby Results
Player	Team	Out Count	Fever Time	Total	Note
Preliminary Round (5 outs + 1 minute)
Oh Tae-gon	SSG	2	5	7	(Note: 2nd Ranking: Longest Distance (140m))
Heo In-seo	Hanwha	5	2	7	
Kim Ju-won	NC	1	1	2	
Moon Hyun-bin	Hanwha	1	3	4	
Kang Baek-ho	Hanwha	6	1	7	(Note: 1st Ranking: Longest Distance (145m))
Park Jun-soon	Doosan	1	0	1	
Yang Eui-ji	Doosan	2	4	6	
Kim Do-yeong	Kia	1	1	2	
Final (7 outs + 1 minute)
Oh Tae-gon	SSG	4	3	7	
Kang Baek-ho	Hanwha	3	4	7	
Sudden Death (30 Seconds)
Oh Tae-gon	SSG			0	
Kang Baek-ho	Hanwha			1	

==== Home Run Derby Award ====
Award Categories	Player	Team	Note
Winner	Kang Baek-ho	Hanwha	Preliminary 7 runs, Final 7 runs
Runner-up	Oh Tae-gon	SSG	Preliminary 7 runs, Final 7 runs
Distance Award	Kang Baek-ho	Hanwha	145m
Comfya Award	Han Jun-su	Kia	Kang Baek-ho Support

=== All-Star Game Roster ===
==== Nanum All-Stars ====
Nanum All-Stars Roster
Pos.	Player	Team	Votes	PV	Score	NS	Note
BEST 12
SP	Adam Oller	Kia	1,383,142	150	30.91	★	
RP	Jung Hai-young	Kia	1,719,895	102	32.00	★★★	
CP	Sung Yeong-tak	Kia	1,767,187	206	40.58	★	
C	Heo In-seo	Hanwha	1,677,179	181	37.41	★	
1B	Austin Dean	LG	2,392,848	267	54.04	★★	(Note: First Ranking in total)
2B	Park Min-woo	NC	1,011,378	250	33.29	★★★	
3B	Kim Do-yeong	Kia	2,130,217	275	50.95	★★★	
SS	Kim Ju-won	NC	1,136,910	233	33.76	★★	
OF	Park Hae-min	LG	2,161,787	125	39.98	★★★	
OF	Moon Hyun-bin	Hanwha	1,617,290	157	34.74	★★	
OF	Park Jae-hyun	Kia	1,702,552	114	32.67	★	
DH	Kang Baek-ho	Hanwha	1,897,075	257	46.30	★★★	
KBO Manager's Recommend Player
P	Woo Kang-hoon	LG	-				
P	Ryu Hyun-jin	Hanwha	-				
P	Ryu Jin-wook	NC	-				
P	Jeon Sa-min	NC	-				
P	Park Joon-hyun	Kiwoom	-				
P	Ahn Woo-jin	Kiwoom	-				
P	Yuto Kanakubo	Kiwoom	-				
C	Han Jun-su	Kia	-				
C	Kim Gun-hee	Kiwoom	-				
IF	Koo Bon-hyeok	LG	-				
IF	Lee Do-yun	Hanwha	-				
OF	Moon Sung-ju	LG	-				
OF	Song Chan-eui	LG	-				
All-star Coaching Staff
MANAGER	Youm Kyoung-youb	LG	-				(Note: Manager of LG Twins)
COACH	Kim Kyung-moon	Hanwha	-				(Note: Manager of Hanwha Eagles)
COACH	Lee Ho-joon	NC	-				(Note: Manager of NC Dinos)
COACH	Lee Bum-ho	Kia	-				(Note: Manager of Kia Tigers)
COACH	Seol Jong-jin	Kiwoom	-				(Note: Manager of Kiwoom Heroes)

==== Dream All-Stars ====
Dream All-Stars Roster
Pos.	Player	Team	Votes	PV	Score	NS	Note							
BEST 12
BEST 12								SP	Gwak Been	Doosan	2,360,174	182	47.11	★
RP	Lee Seung-min	Samsung	1,365,505	109	27.54	★								
CP	Lee Young-ha	Doosan	1,610,996	29	24.91	★								
C	Yang Eui-ji	Doosan	2,605,510	187	50.95	★★★★★★★★★	(Note: Most votes by the fan vote)							
1B	Lewin Díaz	Samsung	2,010,511	195	43.17	★★								
2B	Park Jun-soon	Doosan	2,258,064	127	41.48	★								
3B	Choi Jeong	SSG	1,832,866	173	39.00	★★★★★★★★★★								
SS	Park Chan-ho	Doosan	2,299,195	87	39.02	★★★								
OF	Koo Ja-wook	Samsung	2,010,015	215	44.69	★★★★★★★★★★								
OF	Jung Soo-bin	Doosan	2,272,910	48	35.68	★★								
OF	Choi Won-jun	KT	1,054,151	253	34.12	★								
DH	Choi Hyoung-woo	Samsung	1,794,109	278	46.45	★★★★★★★★★								
KBO Manager's Recommend Player
P	Kim Keon-woo	SSG	-											
P	Yang Chang-seop	Samsung	-				(Note: Jang Chan-hee (Samsung), Replacement Player)							
P	Son Dong-hyun	KT	-											
P	Jeon Yong-ju	KT	-											
P	Kim Jin-uk	Lotte	-				(Note: Absent of Gyeonggi Non-business trip)							
P	Park Jeong-min	Lotte	-											
P	Hyeon Do-hoon	Lotte	-											
C	Cho Hyeong-woo	SSG	-											
C	Kim Do-hwan	Samsung	-											
IF	Jeong Jun-jae	SSG	-											
IF	Hur Kyoung-min	KT	-											
OF	Oh Tae-gon	SSG	-											
OF	Hwang Seong-bin	Lotte	-											
All-star Coaching Staff
MANAGER	Lee Soong-yong	SSG	-				(Note: Manager of SSG Landers)							
COACH	Park Jin-man	Samsung	-				(Note: Manager of Samsung Lions)							
COACH	Lee Kang-chul	KT	-				(Note: Manager of KT Wiz)							
COACH	Kim Tae-hyoung	Lotte	-				(Note: Manager of Lotte Giants)							
COACH	Kim Won-hyong	Doosan	-				(Note: Manager of Doosan Bears)							

=== Result ===
July 11, 2026 | 18:00 KST at Jamsil Baseball Stadium, Seoul, South Korea
Team	1	2	3	4	5	6	7	8	9	R	H	E
Nanum All-Stars	0	0	0	2	0	5	0	3	0	10	22	1
Dream All-Stars	0	0	1	0	0	0	0	0	1	2	9	0
Starting pitchers: Nanum: Adam Oller (Kia); Dream: Gwak Been (Doosan); WP: Ahn Woo-jin (Kiwoom/Nanum) LP: Hyeon Do-hoon (Lotte/Dream); Attendance: 23,750; Umpires: Bae Byeong-du, Chu Pyeong-ho, Park Gi-taek, Song Su-geun, Kim Tae-wan, Choi Young-ju; Boxscore

==== Nanum All-Stars Lineup ====
Nanum All-Stars Batting
#	Player	Pos.	Team	BA	AB	R	H	HR	RBIs	SB	BB	SO	ER
1	Park Min-woo	2B	NC	0.000	2	0	0	0	0	0	0	1	0
1	Lee Do-yun	2B	Hanwha	0.750	4	1	3	0	3	0	0	0	0
2	Park Hae-min	CF	LG	0.250	4	0	1	0	0	0	0	0	0
2	Moon Sung-ju	CF	LG	0.000	2	0	0	0	0	0	0	0	0
3	Kim Do-yeong	3B	Kia	0.400	5	0	2	0	0	0	1	1	0
4	Kang Baek-ho	DH	Hanwha	0.000	5	0	0	0	1	0	0	2	0
4	Kim Gun-hee	PH→DH	Kiwoom	0.500	2	1	1	0	0	0	0	0	0
5	Austin Dean	1B	LG	0.333	3	1	1	0	0	0	0	0	1
5	Han Jun-su	1B	Kia	0.667	3	1	2	0	2	0	0	0	0
6	Moon Hyun-bin	RF	Hanwha	0.800	5	3	4	0	1	0	0	0	0
7	Kim Ju-won	SS	NC	0.500	2	1	1	0	1	0	0	1	0
7	Koo Bon-hyeok	SS	LG	0.500	2	0	1	0	1	0	0	0	0
8	Heo In-seo	C	Hanwha	0.800	5	1	4	0	1	0	0	0	0
9	Park Jae-hyun	LF	Kia	0.000	2	0	0	0	0	0	0	1	0
9	Song Chan-eui	PH→LF	LG	0.667	3	1	2	0	0	0	0	0	0

Nanum All-Stars Pitching
Player	Team	IP	NB	NP	AB	HA	HR	SH	BB	SO	RA	ER	ERA
Adam Oller	Kia	1.0	3	11	2	0	0	0	1	0	0	0	0.00
Ryu Hyun-jin	Hanwha	1.0	4	9	4	0	0	0	0	0	0	0	0.00
Ahn Woo-jin	Kiwoom	1.0	6	24	5	2	0	0	1	0	1	1	9.00
Park Joon-hyun	Kiwoom	1.0	6	23	5	2	0	0	1	1	0	0	0.00
Jeon Sa-min	NC	1.0	4	10	3	1	0	0	1	0	0	0	0.00
Woo Kang-hoon	LG	1.0	3	17	3	0	0	0	0	0	0	0	0.00
Yuto Kanakubo	Kiwoom	1.0	4	11	4	1	0	0	0	1	0	0	0.00
Jung Hai-young	Kia	1.0	3	10	3	0	0	0	0	0	0	0	0.00
Ryu Jin-wook	NC	0.1	1	5	1	0	0	0	0	0	0	0	0.00
Sung Yeong-tak	Kia	0.2	5	19	5	3	0	0	0	0	1	1	13.50

==== Dream All-Stars Lineup ====
Dream All-Stars Batting
#	Player	Pos.	Team	BA	AB	R	H	HR	RBIs	SB	BB	SO	DP	ER
1	Choi Won-jun	RF→CF	KT	0.000	3	0	0	0	0	0	2	0	0	0
2	Koo Ja-wook	LF	Samsung	0.333	3	0	1	0	0	0	0	0	1	0
2	Hwang Seong-bin	PR→LF	Lotte	0.500	2	0	1	0	1	1	0	1	0	0
3	Choi Jeong	3B	SSG	0.000	1	0	0	0	0	0	0	0	0	0
3	Hur Kyoung-min	3B	KT	1.000	1	0	1	0	1	0	1	0	0	0
3	Jeong Jun-jae	2B	SSG	0.000	2	0	0	0	0	0	0	0	0	0
4	Choi Hyoung-woo	DH	Samsung	0.000	1	0	0	0	0	0	0	0	0	0
4	Cho Hyeong-woo	PR→DH→C	SSG	0.000	3	0	0	0	0	0	0	0	0	0
5	Lewin Díaz	1B	Samsung	0.250	4	0	1	0	0	0	0	0	0	0
5	Lee Young-ha	P	Doosan	-	0	0	0	0	0	0	0	0	0	0
6	Yang Eui-ji	C	Doosan	0.000	1	0	0	0	0	0	0	0	0	0
6	Kim Do-hwan	C→1B	Samsung	0.000	3	0	0	0	0	0	0	1	0	0
7	Park Jun-soon	2B→3B	Doosan	0.250	4	0	1	0	0	0	0	0	0	0
8	Jung Soo-bin	OF	Doosan	0.000	2	0	0	0	0	0	0	0	0	0
8	Oh Tae-gon	PH→RF	SSG	0.500	2	1	1	0	0	0	0	0	0	0
9	Park Chan-ho	SS	Doosan	1.000	3	1	3	0	0	0	1	0	0	0

Dream All-Stars Pitching
Player	Team	IP	NB	NP	AB	HA	HR	SH	BB	SO	RA	ER	ERA
Gwak Been	Doosan	0.2	4	20	3	1	0	0	1	2	0	0	0.00
Yang Chang-seop	Samsung	1.1	6	13	6	2	0	0	0	1	0	0	0.00
Jeon Yong-ju	KT	1.0	3	12	3	0	0	0	0	1	0	0	0.00
Hyeon Do-hoon	Lotte	1.0	7	22	6	4	0	0	0	1	2	2	18.00
Kim Keon-woo	SSG	1.0	3	11	3	0	0	0	0	1	0	0	0.00
Park Jeong-min	Lotte	0.1	7	29	7	6	0	0	0	0	5	5	135.00
Lee Seung-min	Samsung	1.2	8	26	7	3	0	0	0	0	0	0	0.00
Son Dong-hyun	KT	1.0	7	24	7	4	0	0	0	0	3	3	27.00
Lee Young-ha	Doosan	1.0	5	17	5	2	0	0	0	0	0	0	0.00

These are the final all-stars played.

=== Awards in All-star Game ===
Award Categories	Players & All-Star team	Player's Team	Records
Mr. All-Star	Heo In-seo (Nanum)	Hanwha	4 hits in 5 at-bats, 1 RBI
Outstanding Batter Award	Moon Hyun-bin (Nanum)	Hanwha	4 hits in 5 at-bats, 1 RBI
Best Pitcher Award	Ryu Hyun-jin (Nanum)	Hanwha	Pitched a scoreless inning
Outstanding Defender Award	Park Jun-soon (Dream)	Doosan	In the top 5th inning with one out, caught Kang Baek-ho's batted ball and tossed with Park Chan-ho
Manager of the All-Star Award	Youm Kyoung-youb (Nanum)	LG	Team Nanum win as 10-2
Performance Award	Hwang Seong-bin (Dream)	Lotte	Two times career winner and most All-star in this award

== Postseason ==
The 2026 KBO League postseason began on October 14. The KT Wiz, Samsung Lions, Kia Tigers, LG Twins, and Doosan Bears qualified for the playoffs. The Wiz won the pennant race (first place).

=== Qualification ===
In order for a team to qualify for the postseason, they must rank fifth or higher in the regular season. Fifth and fourth place are guaranteed to play in the Wild Card, third in the semi-playoff, second in the playoff, and first in the Korean Series.

In the regular season standings, there is a Postseason column indicating the postseason status of each team.

=== Postseason bracket ===
The 2026 KBO postseason started in the fall. The top five teams in the regular season standings qualified: The Wiz, Lions, Tigers, Twins, and Bears.

Wild Card
4	LG Twins	1
5	Doosan Bears	0

Semi-playoff
3	Kia Tigers	3
4	LG Twins	0

Playoff
2	Samsung Lions	3
3	Kia Tigers	2

Korean Series
1	KT Wiz	1
2	Samsung Lions	4

==== Wild Card ====
===== (4) LG Twins vs (5) Doosan Bears =====
The series started with a 1–0 advantage for Twins.

Twins won the series, 2–0.

Game	Date	Score	Location	Time	Attendance
1	October 14	Doosan Bears – 1, LG Twins – 4	Seoul Sports Complex Baseball Stadium	3:22	23,650

This wild card match was the final match for the Doosan Bears and the Jamsil Derby in the postseason at Seoul Sports Complex Baseball Stadium.

==== Semi-playoff ====
Quarterfinals – best of 5 series.

===== (3) Kia Tigers vs (4) LG Twins =====
Tigers won the series, 3–0.

Game	Date	Score	Location	Time	Attendance
1	October 17	LG Twins – 1, Kia Tigers – 5	Gwangju-Kia Champions Field	2:57	18,900
2	October 18	LG Twins – 3, Kia Tigers – 6	Gwangju-Kia Champions Field	3:05	18,900
3	October 20	Kia Tigers – 13, LG Twins – 1	Seoul Sports Complex Baseball Stadium	3:27	23,650

The semi-playoff MVP is Kim Do-yeong of the Kia Tigers. On October 20, this was the final match at Seoul Sports Complex Baseball Stadium in the postseason of the KBO before the stadium is set to be demolished.

==== Playoff ====
Semi-finals – best of 5 series.

Game 1 was rained out, so the game was played on October 26 instead of October 25.

===== (2) Samsung Lions vs (3) Kia Tigers =====
Samsung won the series, 3–2.

Game	Date	Score	Location	Time	Attendance
1	October 26	Kia Tigers – 5, Samsung Lions – 1	Daegu Samsung Lions Park	3:11	23,550
2	October 27	Kia Tigers – 3, Samsung Lions – 8	Daegu Samsung Lions Park	3:25	23,550
3	October 29	Samsung Lions – 6, Kia Tigers – 4	Gwangju-Kia Champions Field	3:48	18,900
4	October 30	Samsung Lions – 2, Kia Tigers – 4	Gwangju-Kia Champions Field	3:01	18,900
5	November 1	Kia Tigers – 1, Samsung Lions – 6	Daegu Samsung Lions Park	2:36	23,550

The MVP of the playoff is Ariel Jurado of the Samsung Lions.

==== 2026 Korean Series ====
Finals – best of 7 series.

===== (1) KT Wiz vs (2) Samsung Lions =====
Samsung won the series, 4–1.

Game	Date	Score	Location	Time	Attendance
1	November 3	Samsung Lions – 7, KT Wiz – 8	Suwon KT Wiz Park	3:36	17,700
2	November 4	Samsung Lions – 3, KT Wiz – 2	Suwon KT Wiz Park	4:21	17,700
3	November 6	KT Wiz – 1, Samsung Lions – 5	Daegu Samsung Lions Park	2:48	23,550
4	November 7	KT Wiz – 5, Samsung Lions – 10	Daegu Samsung Lions Park	3:17	23,550
5	November 8	KT Wiz – 1, Samsung Lions – 12	Daegu Samsung Lions Park	3:02	23,550

Legend • WC: Wild Card winner • SPO: Semi-playoff winner • PO: Playoff winner

Note: All dates and times are in KST (Korea Standard Time).

== Attendance ==
The average home attendances per club as of October 2026:

#	Baseball club	Average attendance
1	Samsung Lions	23,521
2	LG Twins	22,222
3	Doosan Bears	21,233
4	Lotte Giants	19,161
5	KIA Tigers	17,800
6	SSG Landers	17,627
7	Hanhwa Eagles	16,207
8	KT Wiz	14,408
9	Kiwoom Heroes	12,820
10	NC Dinos	12,369

== See also ==
- 2026 Major League Baseball season
- 2026 Nippon Professional Baseball season
- 2026 in baseball
