= 2019 KBO League season =

2019 KBO League
- League: KBO League
- Sport: Baseball
- Duration: March 23 – October 1
- Games: 144 per team
- Teams: 10
- Total attendance: 7,286,008

Regular Season
- Season champions: Doosan Bears
- Season MVP: Josh Lindblom (Doosan)

Postseason
- Wild Card champions: LG Twins
- Wild Card runners-up: NC Dinos
- Semi-playoffs champions: Kiwoom Heroes
- Semi-playoffs runners-up: LG Twins
- Playoffs champions: Kiwoom Heroes
- Playoffs runners-up: SK Wyverns

Korean Series
- Champions: Doosan Bears
- Runners-up: Kiwoom Heroes
- Finals MVP: Oh Jae-il (Doosan)

KBO League seasons
- ← 2018 2020 →

The 2019 KBO League season was the 38th season in the history of the KBO League. The regular season began on March 23 and ended on October 1. The All-Star break was extended from four days to seven.

== Standings ==
Rank	Team	P	W	L	D	Pct.	GB	Postseason
1	Doosan Bears	144	88	55	1	.615	–	Korean Series
2	SK Wyverns	144	88	55	1	.615	0.0	Playoff
3	Kiwoom Heroes	144	86	57	1	.601	2.0	Semi-playoff
4	LG Twins	144	79	64	1	.552	9.0	Wild Card
5	NC Dinos	144	73	69	2	.514	14.5	Wild Card
6	kt Wiz	144	71	71	2	.500	16.5	Did not qualify
7	KIA Tigers	144	62	80	2	.437	25.5	Did not qualify
8	Samsung Lions	144	60	83	1	.420	28.0	Did not qualify
9	Hanwha Eagles	144	58	86	0	.403	30.5	Did not qualify
10	Lotte Giants	144	48	93	3	.340	39.0	Did not qualify

Doosan Bears ranked ahead of SK Wyverns due to winning their head-to-head season series 9-7.

== League Leaders ==
Batting leaders
Stat	Player	Team	Total
Batting Average	Yang Eui-ji	NC Dinos	.354
Home Runs	Park Byung-ho	Kiwoom Heroes	33
Runs Batted In	Jerry Sands	Kiwoom Heroes	113
Runs	Kim Ha-seong	Kiwoom Heroes	112
Hits	Jose Fernandez	Doosan Bears	197
Stolen Bases	Park Chan-Ho	Kia Tigers	39
On Base Percentage	Yang Eui-ji	NC Dinos	.438
Slugging Percentage	Yang Eui-ji	NC Dinos	.574

Pitching leaders
Stat	Player	Team	Total
Earned run average	Yang Hyeon-jong	Kia Tigers	2.29
Wins	Josh Lindblom	Doosan Bears	20
Saves	Ha Jae-hoon	SK Wyverns	36
Holds	Kim Sang-su	Kiwoom Heroes	40
Innings Pitched	Josh Lindblom	Doosan Bears	194.2
Winning percentage	Josh Lindblom	Doosan Bears	.870
Strikeouts	Josh Lindblom	Doosan Bears	189
WHIP	Josh Lindblom	Doosan Bears	1.00

== Foreign players ==
Each team could sign up to three foreign players, one of whom must be a hitter. In 2019, the KBO League capped salaries for new foreign players at US$1 million.

Team	Player	Position	In KBO Since	Salary
Samsung Lions	Justin Haley	Pitcher	2019	$900,000
Samsung Lions	Deck McGuire	Pitcher	2019	$950,000
Samsung Lions	Darin Ruf	Infielder	2017	$1,700,000
NC Dinos	Eddie Butler	Pitcher	2019	$1,000,000
NC Dinos	Drew Rucinski	Pitcher	2019	$1,000,000
NC Dinos	Christian Bethancourt	Catcher	2019	$1,000,000
NC Dinos	Jake Smolinski	Outfielder	2019	TK
Doosan Bears	Seth Frankoff	Pitcher	2018	$1,230,000
Doosan Bears	Josh Lindblom	Pitcher	2015	$1,920,000
Doosan Bears	José Miguel Fernández	Infielder	2019	$700,000
Kiwoom Heroes	Jake Brigham	Pitcher	2017	$900,000
Kiwoom Heroes	Eric Jokisch	Pitcher	2019	$500,000
Kiwoom Heroes	Jerry Sands	Outfielder	2018	$500,000
SK Wyverns	Brock Dykxhoorn	Pitcher	2019	$700,000
SK Wyverns	Jamie Romak	Outfielder	2017	$1,300,000
SK Wyverns	Ángel Sánchez	Pitcher	2018	$1,200,000
Hanwha Eagles	Chad Bell	Pitcher	2019	$600,000
Hanwha Eagles	Jared Hoying	Outfielder	2018	$1,400,000
Hanwha Eagles	Warwick Saupold	Pitcher	2019	$1,000,000
Kia Tigers	Jeremy Hazelbaker	Outfielder	2019	$700,000
Kia Tigers	Preston Tucker	Outfielder	2019	$270,000
Kia Tigers	Jacob Turner	Pitcher	2019	$1,000,000
Kia Tigers	Joe Wieland	Pitcher	2019	$1,000,000
Lotte Giants	Carlos Asuaje	Infielder	2019	$550,000
Lotte Giants	Jacob Wilson	Infielder	2019	$400,000
Lotte Giants	Brooks Raley	Pitcher	2015	$1,170,000
Lotte Giants	Jake Thompson	Pitcher	2019	$900,000
LG Twins	Casey Kelly	Pitcher	2019	$1,000,000
LG Twins	Tommy Joseph	Infielder	2019	$1,000,000
LG Twins	Tyler Wilson	Pitcher	2018	$1,500,000
KT Wiz	Raúl Alcántara	Pitcher	2019	$670,000
KT Wiz	William Cuevas	Pitcher	2019	$650,000
KT Wiz	Mel Rojas Jr.	Outfielder	2017	$1,600,000

=== Foreign hitters ===
Team	Player	Batting Average	Home Runs	RBI	Notes
Doosan Bears	José Miguel Fernández	.344	15	88	KBO hits leader; Golden Glove Award
Hanwha Eagles	Jared Hoying	.284	18	73	
Kia Tigers	Jeremy Hazelbaker	.146	2	5	Released by the team
Kia Tigers	Preston Tucker	.311	9	50	Signed to replace Jeremy Hazelbaker
KT Wiz	Mel Rojas Jr.	.322	24	104	Golden Glove Award
LG Twins	Tommy Joseph	.274	9	36	
Lotte Giants	Carlos Asuaje	.252	2	21	Released by the team
Lotte Giants	Jacob Wilson	.251	9	37	Signed to replace Carlos Asuaje
NC Dinos	Christian Bethancourt	.246	8	29	Released by the team
NC Dinos	Jake Smolinski	.229	9	42	Signed to replace Christian Bethancourt
Nexen Heroes	Jerry Sands	.305	28	113	KBO RBI leader; Golden Glove Award
Samsung Lions	Darin Ruf	.291	22	101	
SK Wyverns	Jamie Romak	.276	29	95	

== Postseason ==
Wild Card
4	LG Twins	2
5	NC Dinos	0

Semi-playoff
3	Kiwoom Heroes	3
4	LG Twins	1

Playoff
2	SK Wyverns	0
3	Kiwoom Heroes	3

Korean Series
1	Doosan Bears	4
3	Kiwoom Heroes	0

=== Wild Card ===
The series started with a 1–0 advantage for the fourth-placed team.

LG Twins (2) vs. NC Dinos (0)

Game	Date	Score	Location	Time	Attendance
1	October 3	NC Dinos – 1, LG Twins – 3	Jamsil Baseball Stadium	3:00	23,757

=== Semi-playoff ===
Kiwoom Heroes (3) vs. LG Twins (1)

Game	Date	Score	Location	Time	Attendance
1	October 6	LG Twins – 0, Kiwoom Heroes – 1	Gocheok Sky Dome	2:49	16,300
2	October 7	LG Twins – 4, Kiwoom Heroes – 5 (10 inn.)	Gocheok Sky Dome	-	14,589
3	October 9	Kiwoom Heroes – 2, LG Twins – 4	Jamsil Baseball Stadium	-	25,000
4	October 10	Kiwoom Heroes – 10, LG Twins – 5	Jamsil Baseball Stadium	-	21,600

=== Playoff ===
SK Wyverns (0) vs. Kiwoom Heroes (3)

Game	Date	Score	Location	Time	Attendance
1	October 14	Kiwoom Heroes – 3, SK Wyverns – 0 (11 inn.)	Munhak Baseball Stadium	-	19,356
2	October 15	Kiwoom Heroes – 8, SK Wyverns – 7	Munhak Baseball Stadium	-	17,546
3	October 17	SK Wyverns – 1, Kiwoom Heroes – 10	Gocheok Sky Dome	-	14,051

=== Korean Series ===
Doosan Bears (4) vs. Kiwoom Heroes (0)

Game	Date	Score	Location	Time	Attendance
1	October 22	Kiwoom Heroes – 6, Doosan Bears – 7	Jamsil Baseball Stadium	-	25,000
2	October 23	Kiwoom Heroes – 5, Doosan Bears – 6	Jamsil Baseball Stadium	-	25,000
3	October 25	Doosan Bears – 5, Kiwoom Heroes – 0	Gocheok Sky Dome	-	16,300
4	October 26	Doosan Bears – 11, Kiwoom Heroes – 9	Gocheok Sky Dome	-	-

== Attendances ==
Team	Total attendance	Home average	Change vs. 2018
LG Twins	1,000,400	13,894	-10%
Doosan Bears	983,474	13,659	-12%
SK Wyverns	982,962	13,652	-5%
NC Dinos	710,274	9,865	+60%
KIA Tigers	692,163	9,613	-20%
Samsung Lions	691,681	9,607	-8%
Lotte Giants	679,208	9,33	-25%
Hanwha Eagles	555,225	7,711	-24%
KT Wiz	536,735	7,455	-20%
Kiwoom Heroes	453,886	6,304	-0%
Total	7,286,008	10,119	-10%

== See also ==
- 2019 Major League Baseball season
- 2019 Nippon Professional Baseball season
