= Roberto Ramos =

Roberto Ramos may refer to:

- Roberto Ramos (athlete) (born 1959), Cuban sprinter
- Roberto Ramos (baseball) (born 1994), Mexican baseball first baseman
- Bobby Ramos (born 1955), Cuban baseball catcher
