= Lee Young-ha =

Lee Young-ha may refer to:

- Lee Young-ha (actor) (born 1950)
- Lee Young-ha (speed skater) (1956–2019)
- Lee Young-ha (baseball) (born 1997)
