= Takayuki Murakami =

Japanese baseball player (born 1965)

Takayuki Murakami 村上 隆行
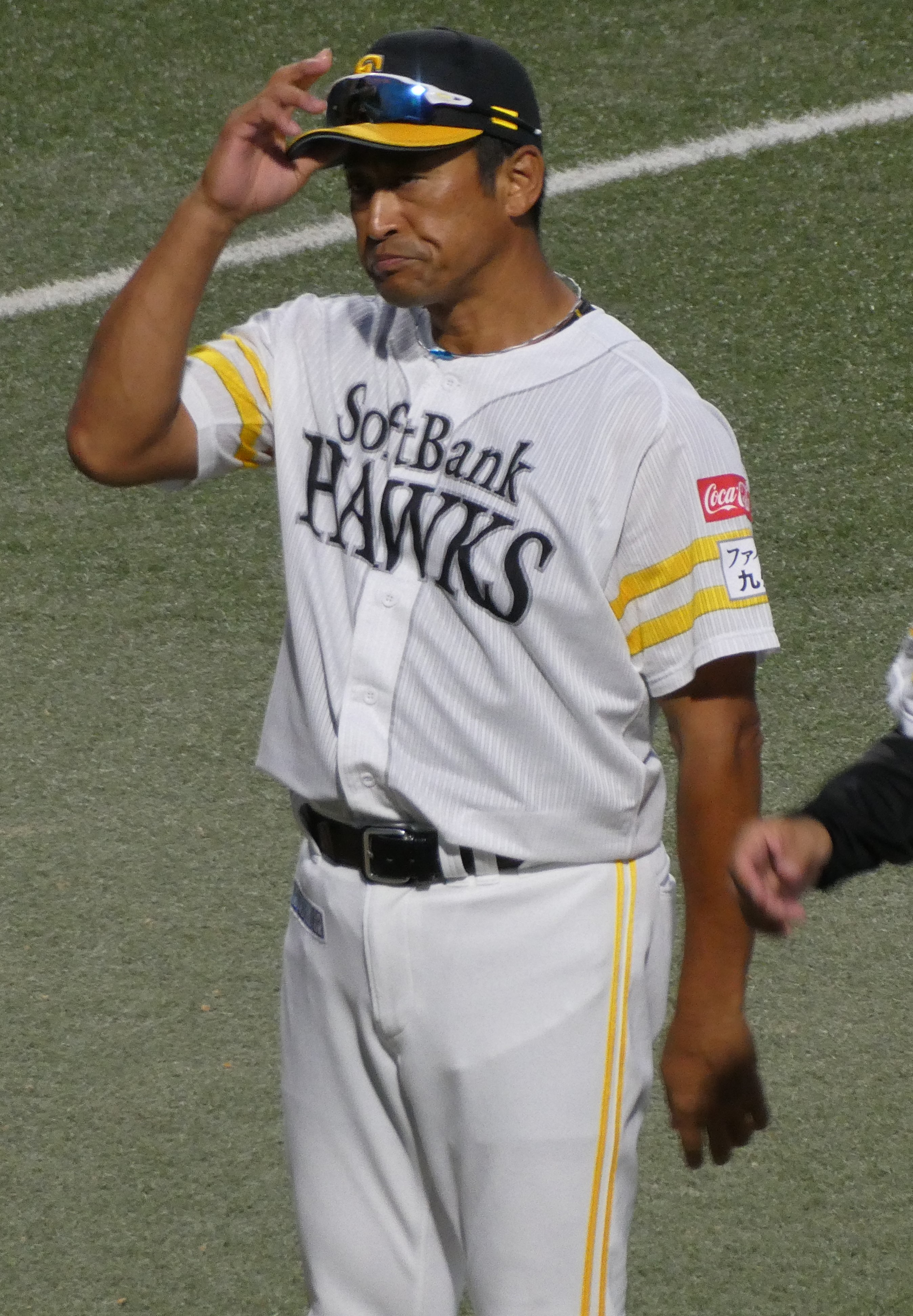
- Murakami with the Fukuoka SoftBank Hawks.

Samsung Lions – No. 85
- Infielder / Coach
- Born: August 26, 1965 (age 61); Ōmuta, Fukuoka, Japan
- Batted: Right Threw: Right

NPB debut
- September 29, 1984, for the Kintetsu Buffaloes

Last NPB appearance
- September 17, 2001, for the Seibu Lions

NPB statistics
- Batting average: .258
- Home runs: 147
- Runs batted in: 464
- Stats at Baseball Reference

Teams
- As player: Kintetsu Buffaloes/Osaka Kintetsu Buffaloes (1984–2000); Seibu Lions (2001); As coach: Chunichi Dragons (2019–2021); Fukuoka SoftBank Hawks (2022–2025); Samsung Lions (2026–present); As manager: Osaka Golden Villicanes (2009–2010); 06BULLS (2011–2018)

Career highlights and awards
- As player: NPB All-Star (1987); As coach: Japan Series champion (2025); Korean Series champion (2026)

Takayuki Murakami (村上 隆行, Murakami Takayuki; born August 26, 1965) is a Japanese former professional baseball infielder, and current first squad hitting coach for the Fukuoka SoftBank Hawks of Nippon Professional Baseball (NPB).

As a player he spent 16 years with the Osaka Kintetsu Buffaloes and 1 year with the Seibu Lions. He also managed the 06 Bulls, leading them to become champions of Hyogo in the Kansai independent league in 2015.

== Career ==
Originally billed as a power hitting short-stop, Murakami played for the Osaka Kintetsu Buffaloes for the majority of his 17-year professional career. He was drafted out of high school by the Buffaloes at the 1983 NPB Draft in the first round.

He also has management experience working with the Osaka Golden Villicanes and the 06BULLS in the Baseball First League of the Kansai region where he led them to victory in the pennant race.

On 29 October 2018, Murakami was announced to be joining the coaching team of newly appointed Chunichi Dragons manager, Tsuyoshi Yoda, taking up a post as first-team hitting instructor. Following Yoda's resignation as manager, Murakami was confirmed as first team hitting instructor for the Fukuoka SoftBank Hawks under new manager Hiroshi Fujimoto for the 2022 NPB season.

He will serve as the second squad hitting coach starting in the 2023 season.

On December 2, 2023, he was transferred to the first squad hitting coach.

== Personal ==
Murakami is an amateur golfer and has played alongside former Hanshin Tigers player and manager, Akinobu Mayumi.
