= Baekho =

Baekho or Baek-ho may refer to:

- White Tiger (mythology) (Baekho in Korean), one of the Four Symbols of the Chinese constellations
- Baekho-myeon, former township in Hampyeong County, South Jeolla, South Korea

Baekho is also a Korean given name. People with this name include:

- Yun Hyu (1617–1680), pen name Baekho, Joseon Dynasty scholar of the Southern Faction
- Baekho (singer) (born 1995), South Korean singer from the boy band NU'EST
- Kang Baek-ho (born 1999), South Korean baseball player
- Kang Baek-ho, a character played by Kim Ji-seok on the South Korean TV show Likeable or Not
