= Chris Paddack =

American baseball player (born 1996)

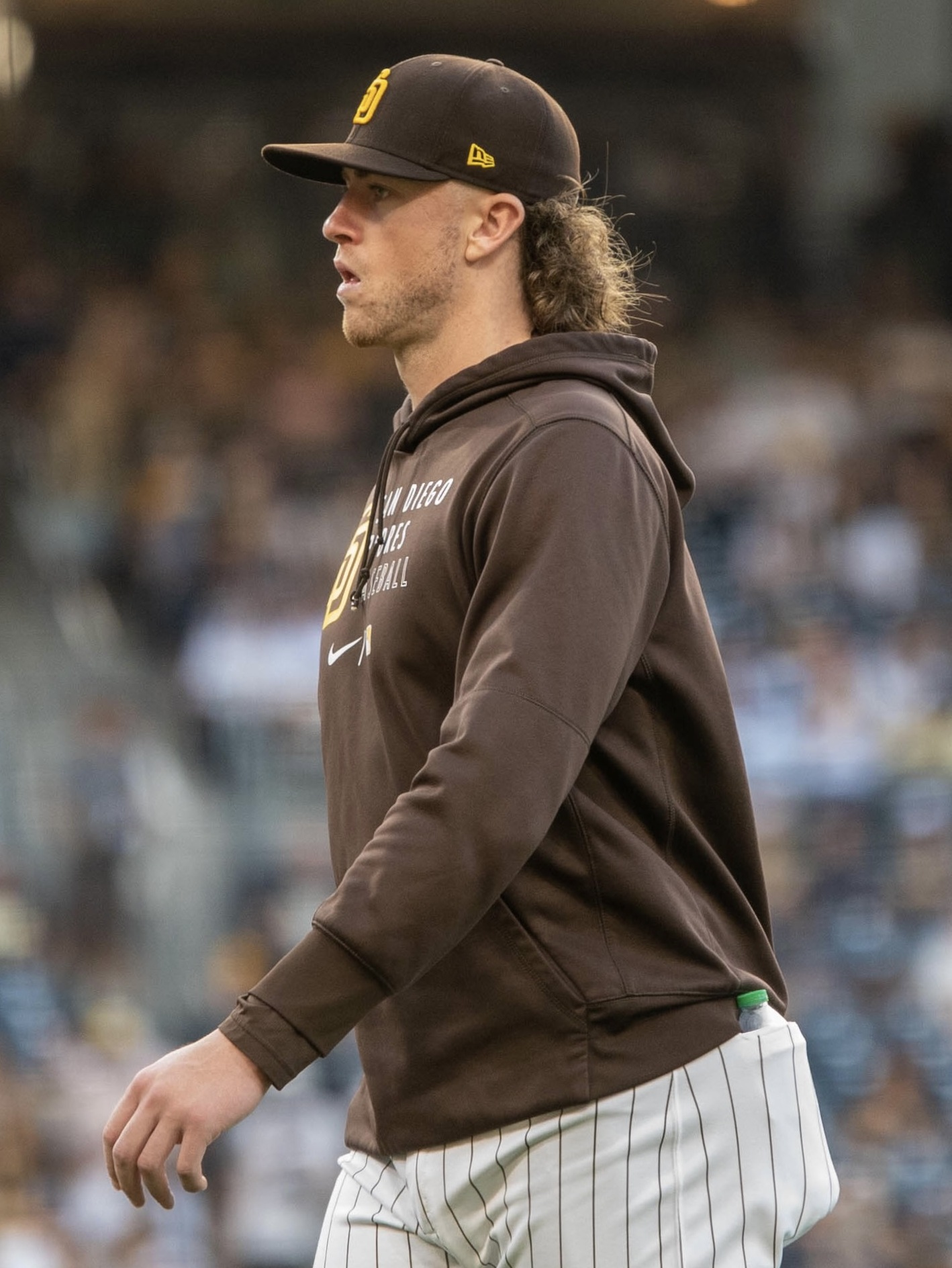
- Paddack with the San Diego Padres in 2021

Samsung Lions – No. 59
- Pitcher
- Born: January 8, 1996 (age 30); Austin, Texas, U.S.
- Bats: Right Throws: Right

Professional debut
- MLB: March 31, 2019, for the San Diego Padres
- KBO: July 18, 2026, for the Samsung Lions

MLB statistics (through June 29, 2026)
- Win–loss record: 32–43
- Earned run average: 4.83
- Strikeouts: 569

KBO statistics (through August 18, 2026)
- Win–loss record: 2–2
- Earned run average: 3.00
- Strikeouts: 35
- Stats at Baseball Reference

Teams
- San Diego Padres (2019–2021); Minnesota Twins (2022–2025); Detroit Tigers (2025); Miami Marlins (2026); Cincinnati Reds (2026); Texas Rangers (2026); Samsung Lions (2026–present)

Career highlights and awards
- Korean Series champion (2026)

Christopher Joseph Paddack (born January 8, 1996) is an American professional baseball pitcher for the Samsung Lions of the KBO League. He has previously played in Major League Baseball (MLB) for the San Diego Padres, Minnesota Twins, Detroit Tigers, Miami Marlins, and Texas Rangers. He was drafted by the Marlins in 2015, then traded to the Padres in 2016. He made his MLB debut with San Diego in 2019, then was traded to Minnesota in 2022. He was traded to Detroit midway through the 2025 season, then returned to Miami via free agency. He signed with Cincinnati early in the 2026 season after being released by Miami.

== Career ==
=== Amateur career ===
Paddack attended Cedar Park High School in Cedar Park, Texas. He committed to play college baseball for the Texas A&M Aggies.

=== Miami Marlins ===
The Miami Marlins selected Paddack in the eighth round (236th overall) of the 2015 Major League Baseball draft and signed. He made his professional debut that year with the rookie-level Gulf Coast League Marlins where he went 4–3 with a 2.18 ERA in 11 games (seven starts). Paddack started 2016 with the Single-A Greensboro Grasshoppers.

=== San Diego Padres ===
On June 30, 2016, the Marlins traded Paddack to the San Diego Padres for Fernando Rodney. He was then assigned to the Fort Wayne TinCaps. On July 30, Paddack was diagnosed with a torn ulnar collateral ligament in his elbow. He underwent Tommy John surgery on August 15 and missed the rest of the 2016 season. In nine starts between Greensboro and Fort Wayne, he posted a 2–0 record and 0.85 ERA along with 71 strikeouts. The surgery forced Paddack to also miss all of 2017.

Paddack returned to the mound in 2018 with the High-A Lake Elsinore Storm. With the Storm, he pitched to a 2.24 ERA in 52 innings before being promoted to the Double-A San Antonio Missions. He was even better for the Missions, pitching to a 1.91 ERA in 38 innings before reaching his innings limit and being shut down for the remainder of the season. The Padres added him to their 40-man roster after the season.

Paddack was invited to spring training by the Padres in 2019 and dominated, pitching to a 3–1 record and a 1.76 ERA in 5 games, earning him a spot on the team's opening day rotation. On March 31, he made his major league debut with a start versus the San Francisco Giants. He allowed one run over five innings and recorded seven strikeouts. On June 12, Paddack was optioned to Lake Elsinore as a way to lessen his amount of innings pitched. He was recalled on June 22. During the season, he earned the nickname "Paddack Attack" for his first-pitch strike-heavy approach and relentless assault on opposing hitters with his fastball and changeup combination. Paddack finished with a record of 9-7 and a 3.33 ERA in 26 starts. He struck out 153 in 140 2/3 innings. Paddack was named the Opening Day starter for the Padres in 2020. He finished 4–5 with a 4.73 ERA. Throughout the season, Paddack struggled with command as he allowed 14 home runs in just 59 innings.

=== Minnesota Twins ===
On April 7, 2022, the Padres traded Paddack, Emilio Pagán, and a player to be named later to the Minnesota Twins in exchange for Taylor Rogers, Brent Rooker, and cash considerations. On May 10, Paddack was put on the 10-day injured list due to a right elbow strain. He underwent his second Tommy John surgery on May 18, ending his season.

On January 13, 2023, Paddack agreed to a one-year, $2.4 million contract with the Twins, avoiding salary arbitration. Later that day, Paddack agreed to a three-year, $12.5 million contract extension with the Twins that bought out his two remaining arbitration-eligible years and what would have been his first year of free agency. On September 24, Paddack was activated from the injured list to make his return from Tommy John surgery. Paddack began the season in the Twins rotation to begin the 2024 season but suffered through another injury shortened season, appearing in only 17 games before a complete shutdown due to a forearm strain in August. Paddack was 5–3 with a 4.99 ERA and 79 strikeouts over 88 1/3 innings pitched.

=== Detroit Tigers ===
On July 28, 2025, the Twins traded Paddack and Randy Dobnak to the Detroit Tigers in exchange for Enrique Jiménez. On September 2, Paddack was moved to the bullpen after posting a 5.40 ERA over six starts. On September 9, Paddack earned his first-ever MLB save, throwing the final three innings (all scoreless) of the Tigers victory over the New York Yankees. He made 12 total appearances (seven of them starts) for Detroit, compiling a 2-3 record and 6.32 ERA with 29 strikeouts over 47 innings of work.

=== Miami Marlins (second stint) ===
On February 12, 2026, Paddack signed a one-year, $4 million contract with the Miami Marlins. He made seven appearances (including six starts) for Miami, but struggled to an 0-5 record and 7.63 ERA with 27 strikeouts across 30 2/3 innings pitched. On May 5, Paddack was designated for assignment by the Marlins. He was released by Miami on May 10.

=== Cincinnati Reds ===
On May 13, 2026, Paddack signed a one-year, major league contract with the Cincinnati Reds. He made six appearances (including three starts) for Cincinnati, posting an 0–2 record and 6.04 ERA with 12 strikeouts across 22 1/3 innings pitched. On June 22, Paddack was designated for assignment by the Reds. He elected free agency two days later after clearing waivers.

=== Texas Rangers ===
On June 29, 2026, Paddack signed a major league contract with the Texas Rangers. He allowed two runs across four innings of relief in a 6–3 victory over the Cleveland Guardians. Paddack was designated for assignment by the Rangers the following day. On July 2, he elected free agency.

=== Samsung Lions ===
On July 11, 2026, Paddack signed a $473,333 contract with the Samsung Lions of the KBO League for the remainder of the 2026 season.
