= Park Chan-ho (shortstop) =

South Korean baseball player (born 1995)

Doosan Bears – No. 7
- Shortstop
- Born: June 5, 1995 (age 31); Daegu, South Korea
- Bats: Right Throws: Right

KBO debut
- 2014, for the Kia Tigers

KBO statistics (through 2025)
- Batting average: .266
- Home runs: 23
- Runs batted in: 353
- Hits: 951
- Stolen bases: 187
- Stats at Baseball Reference

Teams
- Kia Tigers (2014-2025); Doosan Bears (2026-present)

Career highlights and awards
- KBO: Korean Series champion (2024); 2× KBO All-Star (2024, 2026); KBO Golden Glove Award (2024); KBO Fielding Award (2023-2024); KBO stolen bases leader (2019, 2022); KBO Defensive Award (2023)
Korean name
Hangul	박찬호
RR	Bak Chanho
MR	Pak Ch'anho

Park Chan-ho (Korean: 박찬호; pronounced [pɐk̚.tɕʰɐn.ɦo]; born June 5, 1995) is a South Korean professional baseball shortstop for the Doosan Bears of the KBO League.

== Career ==
Park represented South Korea in the 2013 World Junior Baseball Championship, slashing .286/.375/.333, and fielding .968. He was then drafted by the Kia Tigers in the fifth round of the 2014 KBO Draft. He hit .183/.233/.234 in 69 games in 2015, and he had a .167/.222/.167 batting line in 2016. Park then missed the next two seasons due to military service, and returned in 2019 hitting .260/.300/.318 along with his league-leading 39 steals. In 2020, he struggled, hitting .223/.276/.275, but bounced back in 2021 with a batting line of .246/.331/.313 in 131 games.

In 2022, he hit .272/.344/.341 along with 42 steals, leading the league again. In 2023, he improved to .301/.356/.378 and shared his first KBO Fielding Award with Oh Ji-hwan of the LG Twins.

The next year, he won the fielding award again, along with his first shortstop Golden Glove Award following his championship win in the 2024 Korean Series. In addition, he was selected to be in the 2024 KBO All-Star Game to represent the Nanum All-Stars at shortstop. He slashed a career-high of .307/.363/.386 in the regular season, and hit .318/.375/.455 with seven runs in the Korean Series.

In November 2025, Park signed a 4-year deal with the Bears.
