= Roberto Ramos (baseball) =

Mexican baseball player (born 1994)

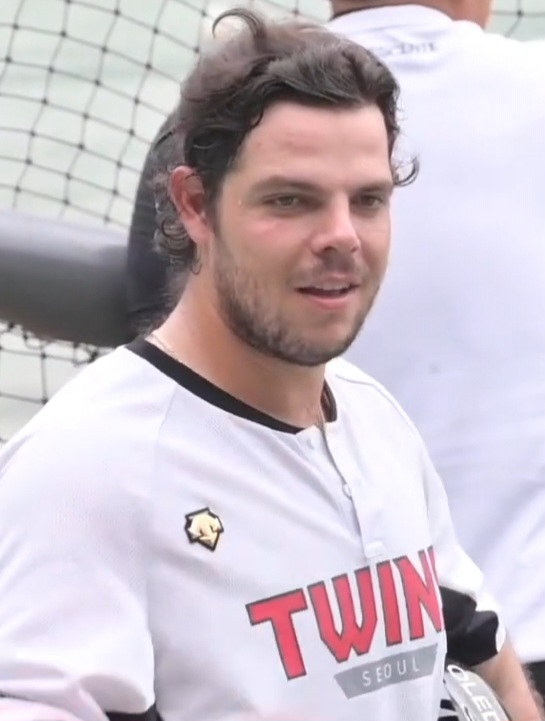
- Ramos with the LG Twins in 2020

El Águila de Veracruz – No. 27
- First baseman
- Born: December 28, 1994 (age 31); Hermosillo, Sonora, Mexico
- Bats: Left Throws: Right

KBO debut
- May 5, 2020, for the LG Twins

KBO statistics (through 2021 season)
- Batting average: .268
- Home runs: 46
- Runs batted in: 111
- Stats at Baseball Reference

Teams
- LG Twins (2020–2021)
Medals
Men's baseball
Representing Mexico
Pan American Games
Bronze medal – third place	2023 Santiago	Team

Roberto Ramos (born December 28, 1994) is a Mexican professional baseball first baseman for El Águila de Veracruz of the Mexican Baseball League. He has previously played in the KBO League for the LG Twins.

== Amateur career ==
Born and raised in Hermosillo, Sonora, Mexico, Ramos graduated from San Fernando High School in San Fernando, California, moving there prior to his junior year. In 2013, his senior year, he batted .429 with 11 home runs and 43 RBIs. Undrafted in the 2013 Major League Baseball draft, he enrolled at College of the Canyons in Santa Clarita, California, where he played college baseball. As a freshman in 2014, he batted .317 with seven home runs and 31 RBIs in 37 games.

== Professional career ==
=== Colorado Rockies ===
Ramos was selected by the Colorado Rockies in the 16th round of the 2014 Major League Baseball draft.

Ramos signed with Colorado and made his professional debut with the Tri-City Dust Devils, earning a promotion to the Grand Junction Rockies in July. In 39 games between the two clubs, he hit .213 with three home runs and 17 RBIs. In 2015, he returned to Grand Junction to begin the year before being promoted to the Asheville Tourists in June; in 55 games with both teams, he slashed .332/.408/.609 with 13 home runs and fifty RBIs. Ramos split the 2016 season with both Grand Junction and the Modesto Nuts, batting .304 with seven home runs and 32 RBIs in only 32 games due to missing over three months due to an injury. In 2017, he returned healthy to play 122 games with the Lancaster JetHawks, posting a .297 batting average with 13 home runs and 68 RBIs.

Ramos began 2018 with Lancaster, with whom he was named a California League All-Star along with winning the Home Run Derby before being promoted to the Hartford Yard Goats in June. In 121 games between both clubs, he hit .269/.368/.574 with 32 home runs and 77 RBIs.

Ramos spent 2019 with the Albuquerque Isotopes, earning Pacific Coast League All-Star honors. Over 127 games, he slashed .309/.400/.580 with thirty home runs and 105 RBIs. After the season, he was assigned to play in the Arizona Fall League for the Salt River Rafters.

=== LG Twins ===
On January 21, 2020, Ramos's contract was purchased by the LG Twins of the KBO League. The following day, the team announced he had officially signed to a one-year, $500,000 deal. Ramos hit 38 home runs in his first season, second-most in the league behind only Mel Rojas Jr. On December 22, 2020, Ramos re-signed with the Twins for 2021 on a contract worth $800K and another $200K of incentives. Through 51 games in 2021, Ramos struggled to the tune of a .243/.317/.422 with eight home runs and 25 RBIs before he suffered a lower back injury on June 9, and ultimately was released by the team on June 27 following the signing of Justin Bour.

=== Boston Red Sox ===
On February 8, 2022, Ramos signed a minor league contract with the Boston Red Sox. He was assigned to the Worcester Red Sox to open the season. On June 27, the Red Sox released Ramos.

=== Diablos Rojos del México ===
On July 1, 2022, Ramos signed with the Diablos Rojos del México of the Mexican League. In 26 games for México, he batted .272/.434/.654 with 10 home runs and 28 RBI.

Ramos played in 56 games for México in 2023, he batted .291/.396/.532 with 12 home runs and 45 RBI.

=== Guerreros de Oaxaca ===
On April 10, 2024, Ramos was traded to the Guerreros de Oaxaca in exchange for Adrian De Horta. In 64 appearances for Oaxaca, he batted .299/.403/.582 with 15 home runs and 41 RBI.

Ramos made 41 appearances for the Guerreros in 2025, slashing .244/.394/.561 with 10 home runs and 33 RBI.

=== Saraperos de Saltillo ===
On July 11, 2025, Ramos was traded to the Saraperos de Saltillo of the Mexican League. In 20 appearances for the Saraperos, Ramos batted .299/.435/.522 with four home runs and 13 RBI.

=== Toros de Tijuana ===
On February 23, 2026, Ramos was loaned to the Toros de Tijuana of the Mexican League. In 18 appearances for the Toros, Ramos batted .125/.250/.292 with one home run and one RBI.

=== El Águila de Veracruz ===
On July 9, 2026, Ramos was loaned to El Águila de Veracruz of the Mexican Baseball League.

== International career ==
Ramos was part of the Mexican squad that won the bronze medal at the 2023 Pan American Games contested in Santiago, Chile in October 2023.
