= Koo Ja-wook =

South Korean baseball player (born 1993)

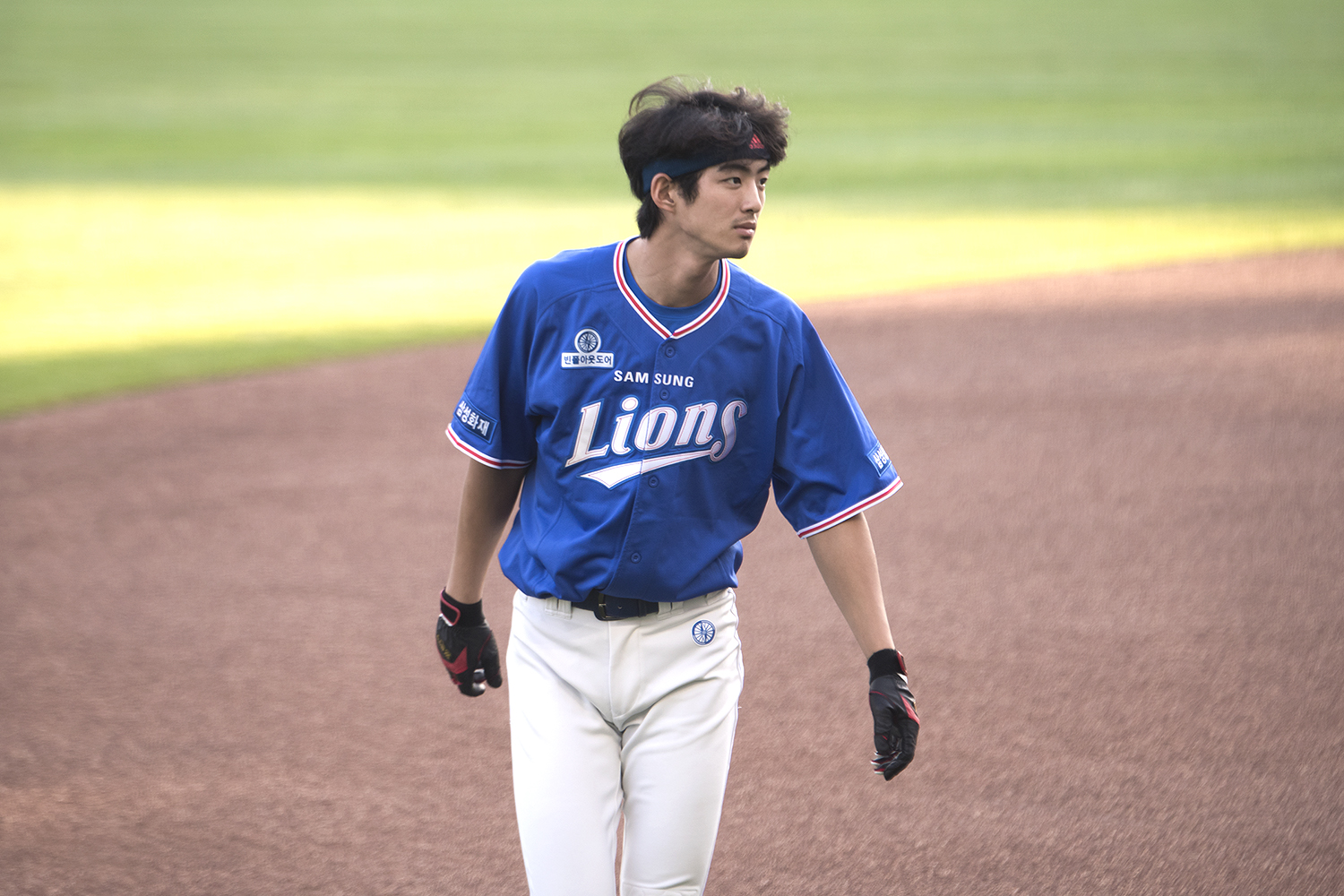
- Koo with the Samsung Lions

Free agent
- Outfielder
- Born: February 12, 1993 (age 33); Daegu, South Korea
- Bats: Left Throws: Right

KBO debut
- March 28, 2015, for the Samsung Lions

KBO statistics (through 2026 season)
- Batting average: .322
- Home runs: 201
- Runs batted in: 984
- Stats at Baseball Reference

Teams
- Samsung Lions (2015–present)

Career highlights and awards
- 10× KBO All-Star (2015-2017, 2019, 2021-2026); KBO Rookie of the Year (2015); 4× KBO Golden Glove Award (2021, 2023, 2024, 2025); Korean Series champion (2026); Korean Series MVP (2026); KBO double leader (2026)

- Koo Ja-wook
- Hangul: 구자욱
- RR: Gu Jauk
- MR: Ku Chauk

Koo Ja-wook (born February 12, 1993) is a South Korean professional baseball outfielder who is currently a free agent.

In 2015, he beat out Kim Ha-seong and Cho Moo-geun to win the KBO Rookie of the Year award.
