= Yang Chang-seop =

South Korean baseball player (born 1999)

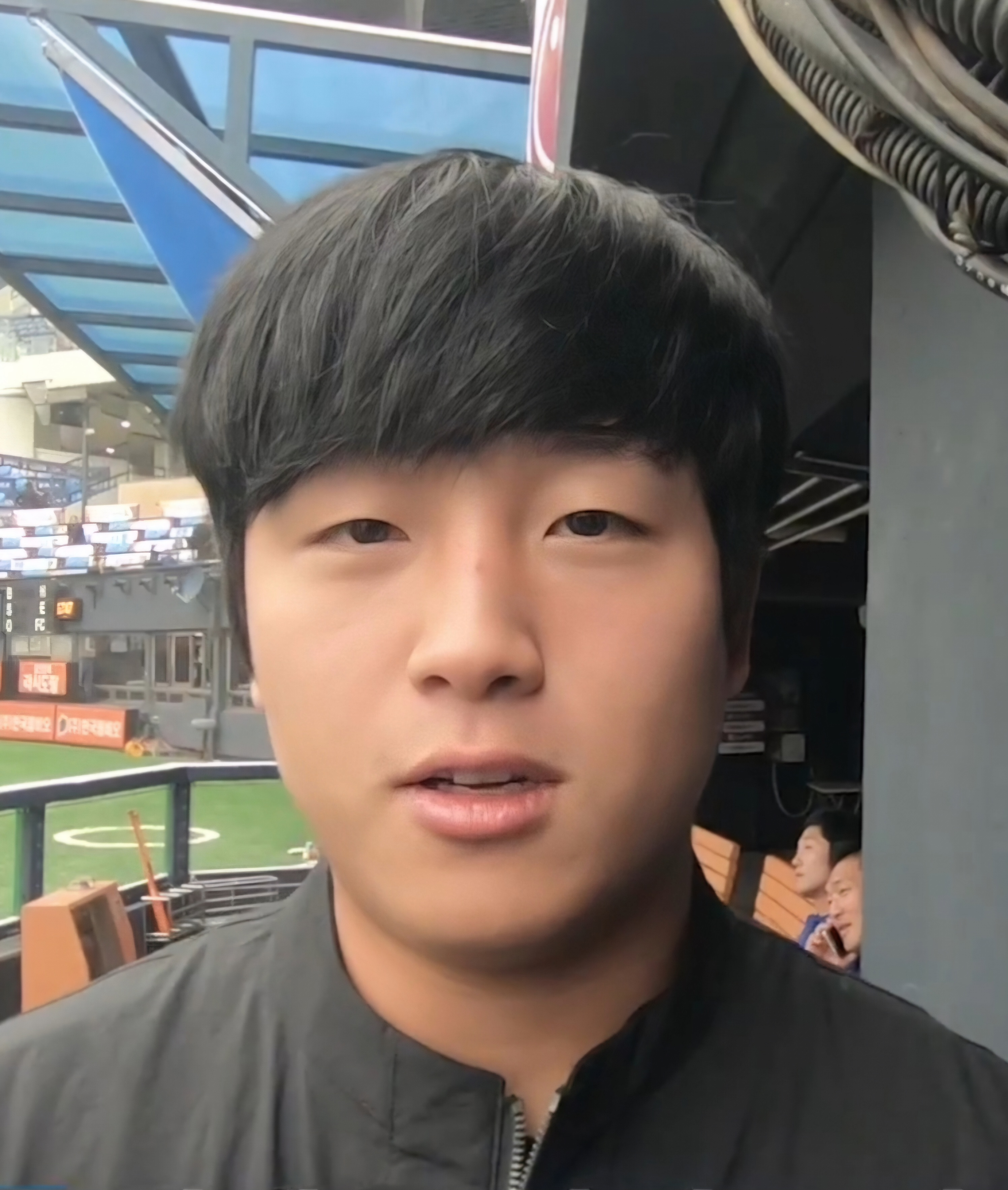

Samsung Lions – No. 42
- Pitcher
- Born: September 22, 1999 (age 27); Seoul, South Korea
- Bats: Right Throws: Right

KBO debut
- March 28, 2018, for the Samsung Lions

KBO statistics (through May 18, 2026)
- Win–loss record: 15–16
- Earned run average: 5.44
- Strikeouts: 150
- Stats at Baseball Reference

Teams
- Samsung Lions (2018, 2020–2023, 2025–present)

Career highlights and awards
- Korean Series champion (2026)

Yang Chang-seop (Korean: 양창섭; born September 22, 1999, in Seoul) is a South Korean pitcher for the Samsung Lions in the Korea Baseball Organization (KBO).
