= Choi Won-tae =

South Korean baseball player (born 1997)

Samsung Lions – No. 20
- Pitcher
- Born: January 7, 1997 (age 29); Seoul, South Korea
- Bats: Right Throws: Right

KBO debut
- May 27, 2016, for the Nexen Heroes

KBO statistics (through 2026)
- Win–loss record: 7–5
- Earned run average: 4.68
- Strikeouts: 119
- Stats at Baseball Reference

Teams
- Nexen Heroes/Kiwoom Heroes (2015–2023); LG Twins (2023–2024); Samsung Lions (2025–present)

Career highlights and awards
- Korean Series champion (2026)
Medals
Men's baseball
Representing South Korea
Asian Games
| Gold medal – first place | 2018 Jakarta-Palembang | Team |

Choi Won-tae (Korean: 최원태; born January 7, 1997) is a South Korean professional baseball pitcher for the Samsung Lions of the KBO League. He appeared in baseball contests during the 2018 Asian Games, and won a gold medal for South Korea.
