= Oh Jae-il =

South Korean baseball player

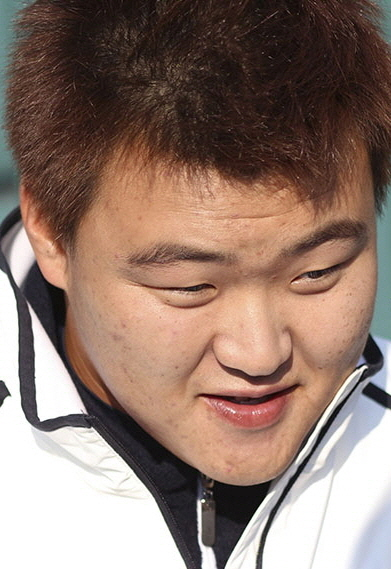
- First baseman
- Born: October 29, 1986 (age 39); Guri, Gyeonggi, South Korea
- Bats: Left Throws: Left

KBO debut
- May 15, 2005, for the Hyundai Unicorns

KBO statistics (through 2024 season)
- Batting average: .273
- Hits: 1,229
- Home runs: 215
- Runs batted in: 873
- Stats at Baseball Reference

Teams
- Hyundai Unicorns (2005); Woori / Nexen Heroes (2009–2011); Doosan Bears (2012–2020); Samsung Lions (2021–2024); KT Wiz (2024–2025)

Career highlights and awards
- 3x Korean Series champion (2015, 2016, 2019); Korean Series MVP (2019)

- Oh Jae-il
- Hangul: 오재일
- Hanja: 吳在一
- RR: O Jaeil
- MR: O Chaeil

Oh Jae-il (Korean: 오재일; Hanja: 吳在一; born October 29, 1986) is a South Korean professional baseball infielder for the KT Wiz of the KBO League. He has previously played in the KBO League for the Hyundai Unicorns, Woori / Nexen Heroes, Doosan Bears, and Samsung Lions.

== Career ==
Oh won the MVP award in the 2017 playoffs against NC Dinos with four home runs and nine RBI. He was the first to hit four home runs in a single game in the postseason and also broke his RBI record.

Oh won the 2019 Korean Series Most Valuable Player Award by hitting .333 (6-for-18) with a home run and six RBI to help the Bears sweep the Kiwoom Heroes in four games.

On May 28, 2024, Oh was traded to the KT Wiz in exchange for Byung-ho Park.

On October 17 2025, he announced his retirement as a player.
