= 2020 KBO League season =

2020 KBO League
- League: KBO League
- Sport: Baseball
- Duration: May 5 – October 31
- Games: 144 per team
- Teams: 10
- Total attendance: 328,317
- TV partner(s): KBS, MBC, SBS, SPOTV, ESPN

Regular Season
- Season champions: NC Dinos
- Season MVP: Mel Rojas Jr. (KT Wiz)

Postseason
- Wild Card champions: LG Twins
- Wild Card runners-up: Kiwoom Heroes
- Semi-playoffs champions: Doosan Bears
- Semi-playoffs runners-up: LG Twins
- Playoffs champions: Doosan Bears
- Playoffs runners-up: KT Wiz

Korean Series
- Champions: NC Dinos
- Runners-up: Doosan Bears
- Finals MVP: Yang Eui-ji (NC Dinos)

KBO League seasons
- ← 2019 2021 →

The 2020 KBO League season, also known by naming rights sponsorship as 2020 Shinhan Bank SOL KBO League (Korean: 2020 신한은행 SOL KBO 리그), was the 39th season in the history of the KBO League.

== Season schedule ==
The 2020 KBO League season schedule was released in December 2019. Opening Day was originally scheduled on 28 March 2020. Due to the COVID-19 pandemic in South Korea, the Korea Baseball Organization announced in March 2020 that all ten exhibition games would be cancelled, and the start of the season would be delayed until April.

The Kia Tigers, a KBO League team that had arrived in the United States on 30 January 2020 to hold a portion of its spring training activities, remained in their early spring training venue, Terry Park Ballfield in Fort Myers, Florida (United States) through March. Preseason KBO League games began on 21 April. The regular season began on 5 May.

An Chi-hong was the only free agent to move to the Lotte Giants.

Starting with the 2020 season, if a tie exists for the No. 1 seed, and automatic trip to the Korean Series, then the tiebreaker (head to head record) will not be implemented; instead, a one game playoff system will be used to determine the automatic bye.

== Standings ==
Regular season standings
Rank	Team	P	W	L	D	Pct.	GB	Postseason
1	NC Dinos	144	83	55	6	.601	—	Korean Series
2	KT Wiz	144	81	62	1	.566	4.5	Playoff
3	Doosan Bears	144	79	61	4	.564	5.0	Semi-playoff
4	LG Twins	144	79	61	4	.564	5.0	Wild Card
5	Kiwoom Heroes	144	80	63	1	.559	5.5	Wild Card
6	Kia Tigers	144	73	71	0	.507	13.0	Did not qualify
7	Lotte Giants	144	71	72	1	.497	14.5	Did not qualify
8	Samsung Lions	144	64	75	5	.460	19.5	Did not qualify
9	SK Wyverns	144	51	92	1	.357	34.5	Did not qualify
10	Hanwha Eagles	144	46	95	3	.326	38.5	Did not qualify

== Postseason ==
Wild Card
4	LG Twins	2
5	Kiwoom Heroes	0

Semi-playoff
3	Doosan Bears	2
4	LG Twins	0

Playoff
2	KT Wiz	1
3	Doosan Bears	3

Korean Series
1	NC Dinos	4
3	Doosan Bears	2

=== Wild Card ===
The series started with a 1–0 advantage for the fourth-placed team.

=== Korean Series ===
NC Dinos won the series, 4–2.

Game	Date	Score	Location	Time	Attendance
1	November 17	Doosan Bears – 3, NC Dinos – 5	Gocheok Sky Dome	3:21	8,200
2	November 18	Doosan Bears – 5, NC Dinos – 4	Gocheok Sky Dome	3:38	8,200
3	November 20	NC Dinos – 6, Doosan Bears – 7	Gocheok Sky Dome	4:24	5,100
4	November 21	NC Dinos – 3, Doosan Bears – 0	Gocheok Sky Dome	3:28	5,100
5	November 23	Doosan Bears – 0, NC Dinos – 5	Gocheok Sky Dome	3:01	5,100
6	November 24	Doosan Bears – 2, NC Dinos – 4	Gocheok Sky Dome	3:34	1,670

== League leaders ==
Batting leaders
Stat	Player	Team	Total
Batting Average	Choi Hyung-woo	Kia Tigers	.354
Home runs	Mel Rojas Jr.	KT Wiz	47
Runs Batted In	Mel Rojas Jr.	KT Wiz	135
Runs	Mel Rojas Jr.	KT Wiz	116
Hits	José Fernández	Doosan Bears	199
Stolen Bases	Sim Woo-jun	KT Wiz	35
On-base percentage	Park Suk-min	NC Dinos	.436
Slugging percentage	Mel Rojas Jr.	KT Wiz	.680

Pitching leaders
Stat	Player	Team	Total
Earned run average	Eric Jokisch	Kiwoom Heroes	2.14
Wins	Raúl Alcántara	Doosan Bears	20
Saves	Cho Sang-woo	Kiwoom Heroes	33
Holds	Ju Kwon	KT Wiz	31
Innings pitched	Odrisamer Despaigne	KT Wiz	207.2
Strikeouts	Dan Straily	Lotte Giants	205
WHIP	Dan Straily	Lotte Giants	1.02

== Foreign hitters ==
=== Foreign hitters ===
Team	Player	Batting Average	Home Runs	RBI	Notes
Doosan Bears	José Miguel Fernández	.340	21	105	KBO hits leader; Golden Glove Award
Hanwha Eagles	Jared Hoying	.194	4	14	Released by the team
Hanwha Eagles	Brandon Barnes	.265	9	42	Signed to replace Jared Hoying
Kia Tigers	Preston Tucker	.306	32	113	
Kiwoom Heroes	Taylor Motter	.114	1	3	Released by the team
Kiwoom Heroes	Addison Russell	.254	2	31	Signed to replace Taylor Motter
KT Wiz	Mel Rojas Jr.	.349	47	135	KBO League Most Valuable Player Award; HR and RBI leader; Golden Glove Award
LG Twins	Roberto Ramos	.278	38	86	
Lotte Giants	Dixon Machado	.280	12	67	
NC Dinos	Aaron Altherr	.271	31	108	
Samsung Lions	Tyler Saladino	.280	6	27	Waived due to injury
Samsung Lions	Daniel Palka	.209	8	23	Signed to replace Tyler Saladino
SK Wyverns	Jamie Romak	.282	32	91	

== See also ==
- 2020 in baseball
- 2020 Major League Baseball season
- 2020 Nippon Professional Baseball season
- 2020 Chinese Professional Baseball League season
- Impact of the COVID-19 pandemic on baseball
