= Yuto Kanakubo =

Japanese baseball player (born 1999)

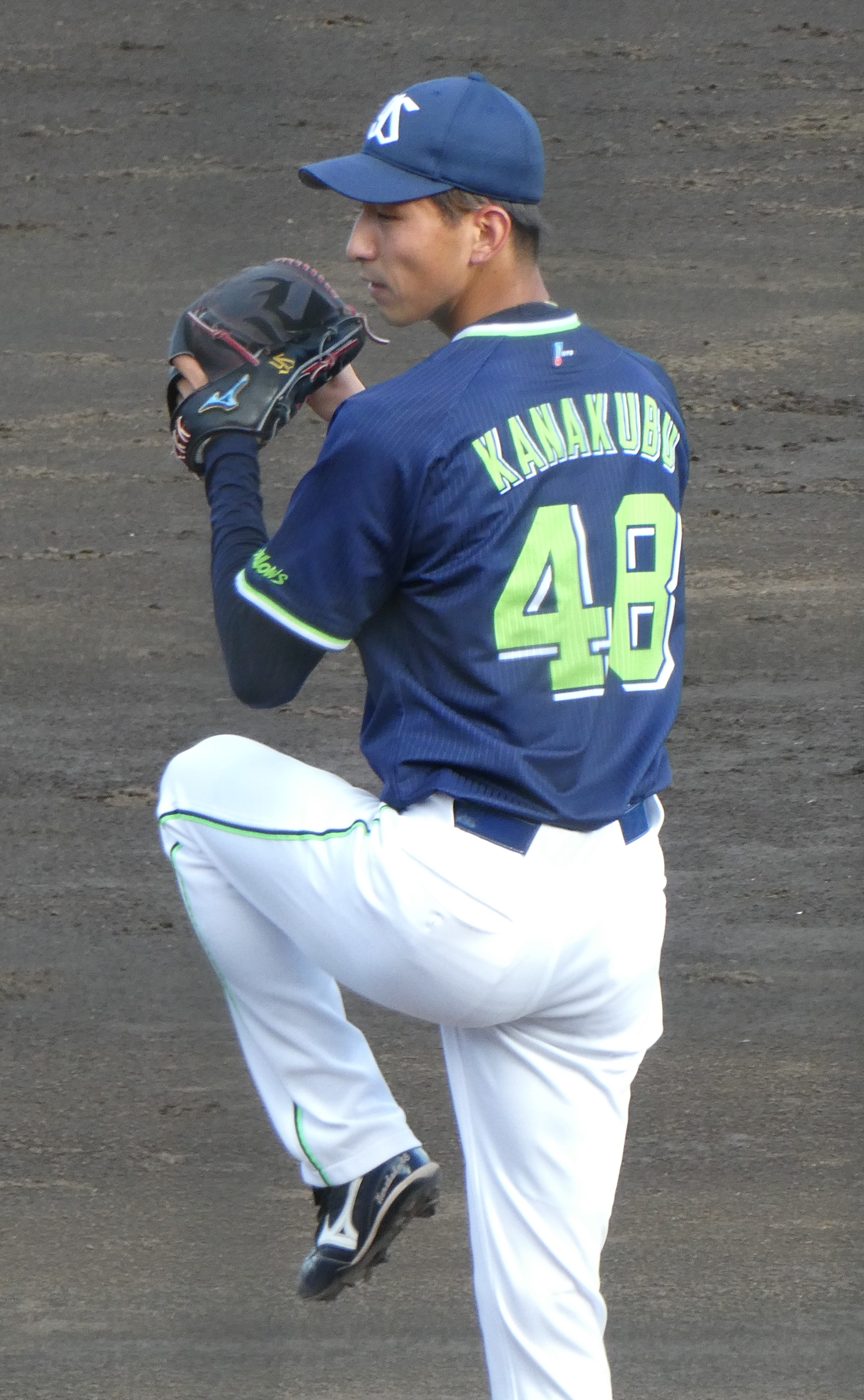
- Kanakubo with the Tokyo Yakult Swallows

Kiwoom Heroes – No. 48
- Pitcher
- Born: November 4, 1999 (age 26); Yachiyo, Chiba, Japan
- Bats: Left Throws: Right

Professional debut
- NPB: October 22, 2020, for the Tokyo Yakult Swallows
- KBO: March 28, 2026, for the Kiwoom Heroes

NPB statistics (through 2025 season)
- Win–loss record: 5–4
- Earned run average: 4.31
- Strikeouts: 69

KBO statistics (through August 19, 2026)
- Win–loss record: 5-4
- Earned run average: 3.24
- Strikeouts: 43
- Saves: 13
- Stats at Baseball Reference

Teams
- Tokyo Yakult Swallows (2018–2025); Kiwoom Heroes (2026–present)

Career highlights and awards
- Japan Series champion (2021)

Yuto Kanakubo (金久保 優斗, Kanakubo Yuto; born November 4, 1999) is a Japanese professional baseball pitcher for the Kiwoom Heroes of the KBO League. He has previously played in Nippon Professional Baseball (NPB) for the Tokyo Yakult Swallows.

== Career ==
=== Tokyo Yakult Swallows ===
From 2018 to 2025, Kanakubo was a member of the Tokyo Yakult Swallows of Nippon Professional Baseball.

=== Kiwoom Heroes ===
On December 16, 2025, Kanakubo signed a one-year, $130,000 contract with the Kiwoom Heroes of the KBO League. On July 22, 2027, he became the first foreign player in the KBO League to make 10 holds-10 saves.
