= Kang Baek-ho =

South Korean baseball player (born 1999)

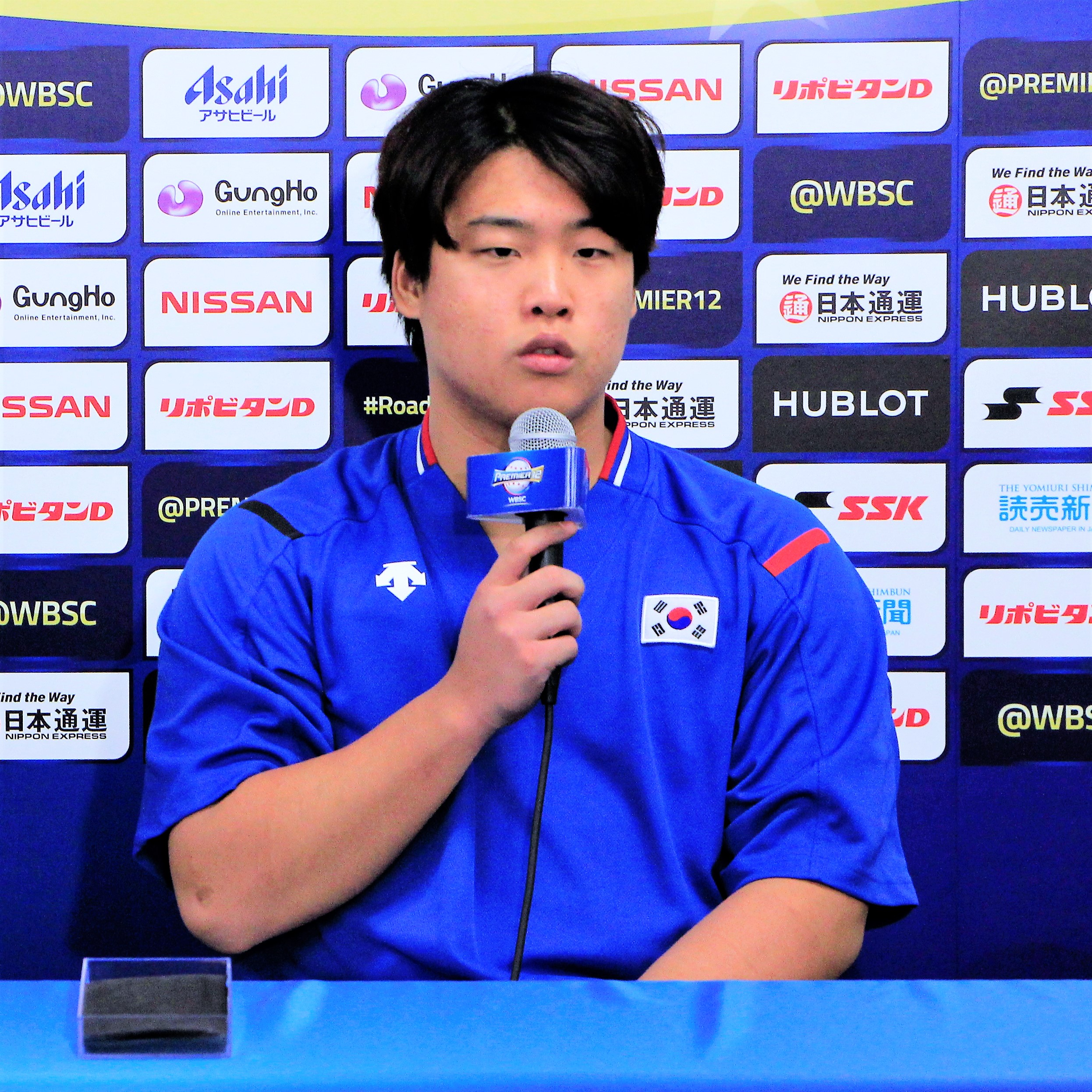
- Baek-ho in 2019

Hanwha Eagles – No. 50
- First baseman / Outfielder
- Born: July 29, 1999 (age 27); Incheon, South Korea
- Bats: Left Throws: Right

KBO debut
- March 24, 2018, for the KT Wiz

KBO statistics (through May 17, 2026)
- Batting average: .305
- Home runs: 146
- Runs batted in: 613
- Stats at Baseball Reference

Teams
- KT Wiz (2018–2025); Hanwha Eagles (2026–present)

Career highlights and awards
- Korean Series champion (2021); KBO Rookie of the Year (2018); 4× KBO All-Star (2018-2020, 2026); 2× KBO Golden Glove Award (2020–2021); KBO Home Run Derby Champion (2026)
Medals
Men's baseball
Representing South Korea
U-18 World Cup
Silver medal – second place	2017 Thunder Bay	Team
WBSC Premier12
Silver medal – second place	2019 Tokyo	Team
Asian Games
Gold medal – first place	2022 Hangzhou	Team

- Kang Baek-ho
- Hangul: 강백호
- Hanja: 姜白虎
- RR: Gang Baekho
- MR: Kang Paekho

Kang Baek-ho (Korean: 강백호; born July 29, 1999) is a South Korean professional baseball first baseman and outfielder for the Hanwha Eagles of the KBO League. He debuted in the KBO League in 2018 with the KT Wiz and played for them through the 2025 season.

== Amateur career ==
Kang began playing baseball in elementary school but had to move between schools several times as a youth due to "a family issue" which he told Ilgan Sports was "hard to talk about."

Kang played high school baseball as a pitcher, catcher and designated hitter at Seoul High School where, as a freshman, he was the first player to hit a home run at Gocheok Sky Dome. In 2017, he led Seoul to a high school baseball championship and was named the most valuable player of the tournament. Kang's accomplishments as a high schooler brought him significant media attention. After high school, Kang decided to enter the KBO against the wishes of his father who wanted him to try for "a bigger stage."

== Professional career ==
=== KT Wiz ===
Kang was selected with the first overall pick in the 2017 KBO draft by the KT Wiz. He made his KBO debut at 18 years old and hit a home run against Héctor Noesí in the first plate appearance of his career. As a professional, he stopped pitching and catching and transitioned to the field. Kang set the rookie record with 29 home runs en route to winning the KBO League Rookie of the Year Award. He pitched in the 2018 KBO All-Star Game and reached speeds of 150 kilometres per hour (93.2 mph). Following the season, his salary was more than tripled to ₩120 million (equivalent to $102,973 in 2019), setting a record for a sophomore player.

In June 2019, Kang underwent surgery on his hand after cutting it on a piece of metal while making a catch in foul territory at Busan Sajik Baseball Stadium. He sat out for the entire month of July due to the injury but was voted a starter on the all-star team nonetheless.

Kang missed three weeks of the 2020 season after hurting his wrist while sliding on defense. Fans voted Kang to the all-star team again in 2020 although the game did not take place due to the COVID-19 pandemic.

At the halfway point of the 2021 season, Kang had a batting average of .395 which led the league by 47 points. He reached base in eight consecutive plate appearances in Games 1 and 2 of the 2021 Korean Series, tying a Korean Series record.

In 2022 and 2023, Kang did not play the full season. Prior to the 2022 season, he broke his toe after falling down stairs and would only play 62 games. In 2023, he played only 72 games due to anxiety and a torn oblique. Kang became a free agent following the 2025 season.

=== Hanwha Eagles ===
On November 20, 2025, Kang signed a four-year contract worth up to ₩10 billion with the Hanwha Eagles.

== International career ==
Kang represented South Korea at the 2017 U-18 Baseball World Cup where he pitched and played the field. He won a silver medal and was named to the All-World Team.

In 2019, he represented South Korea in the Premier12 and played well.

He was named to the South Korean roster for the 2020 Summer Olympics.

Kim won a gold medal at the 2022 Asian Games for South Korea, appearing in six baseball contests, and batting .273/.409/.333 in 22 at-bats.
