= Daegu Munhwa Broadcasting Corporation =

TV and radio station in South Korea

The Daegu Munhwa Broadcasting Corporation (Korean: 대구문화방송) is MBC's local branch for the city of Daegu. The station uses the HLCT callsign.

== History ==
Daegu MBC started radio broadcasts on 8 August 1963. On 23 August 1968, Youngnam Television, an MBC TV affiliate, was established, commencing its broadcasts on 18 July 1970, before being merged with the radio company on 30 September 1971. The television assets were held by the SsangYong Group until 1980, when the Policy for Merger and Abolition of the Press forced the conglomerate to sell its shares.

In 2021, while MBC was planning the creation of the ONE MBC regional dinamization and unification project, a news task force was set up in May of that year to set up a unified news portal for Daegu and Gyeongbuk, with Daegu MBC collaborating with its stations in Pohang and Andong. On 23 August 2021, Daegu MBC started broadcasting from its new facilities at Uksoo-dong. AM radio broadcasts ceased on 19 November 2021, due to declining usage.

== Controversies ==
On 10 July 2009, the Korean Communications Commission issued a three-month commercial ban on the television station, due to the refusal of SsangYong in selling its 8% stake. SsangYong had been acquired by Morgan Stanley PE in May 2006 and this was seen as a violation of the broadcasting code, as SsangYong was a foreign entity.
