= Shim Woo-jun =

South Korean baseball player (born 1995)

Sim Woo-jun

Hanwha Eagles – No. 7
- Shortstop
- Born: April 28, 1995 (age 31); Seoul, South Korea
- Bats: Right Throws: Right

KBO debut
- March 28, 2015, for the KT Wiz

KBO statistics (through 2025)
- Batting average: .252
- Home runs: 33
- Runs batted in: 297
- Stats at Baseball Reference

Teams
- KT Wiz (2015–2024); Hanwha Eagles (2025–present)

Career highlights and awards
- KBO stolen base leader (2020)

- Korean name
- Hangul: 심우준
- Hanja: 沈佑俊
- RR: Sim Ujun
- MR: Sim Ujun

Sim Woo-jun (Korean: 심우준; born April 28, 1995) is a Korean professional baseball infielder for the Hanwha Eagles of the KBO League. He was the national representative of the 26th World Youth Baseball Championships. He graduated Kyunggi High School.

He had a walk-off hit against Son Seung-rak against Lotte on July 29, 2016. In July 2024, he returned from Sangmu Phoenix to KT Wiz.
