= Yoo Han-joon =

South Korean baseball player (born 1981)

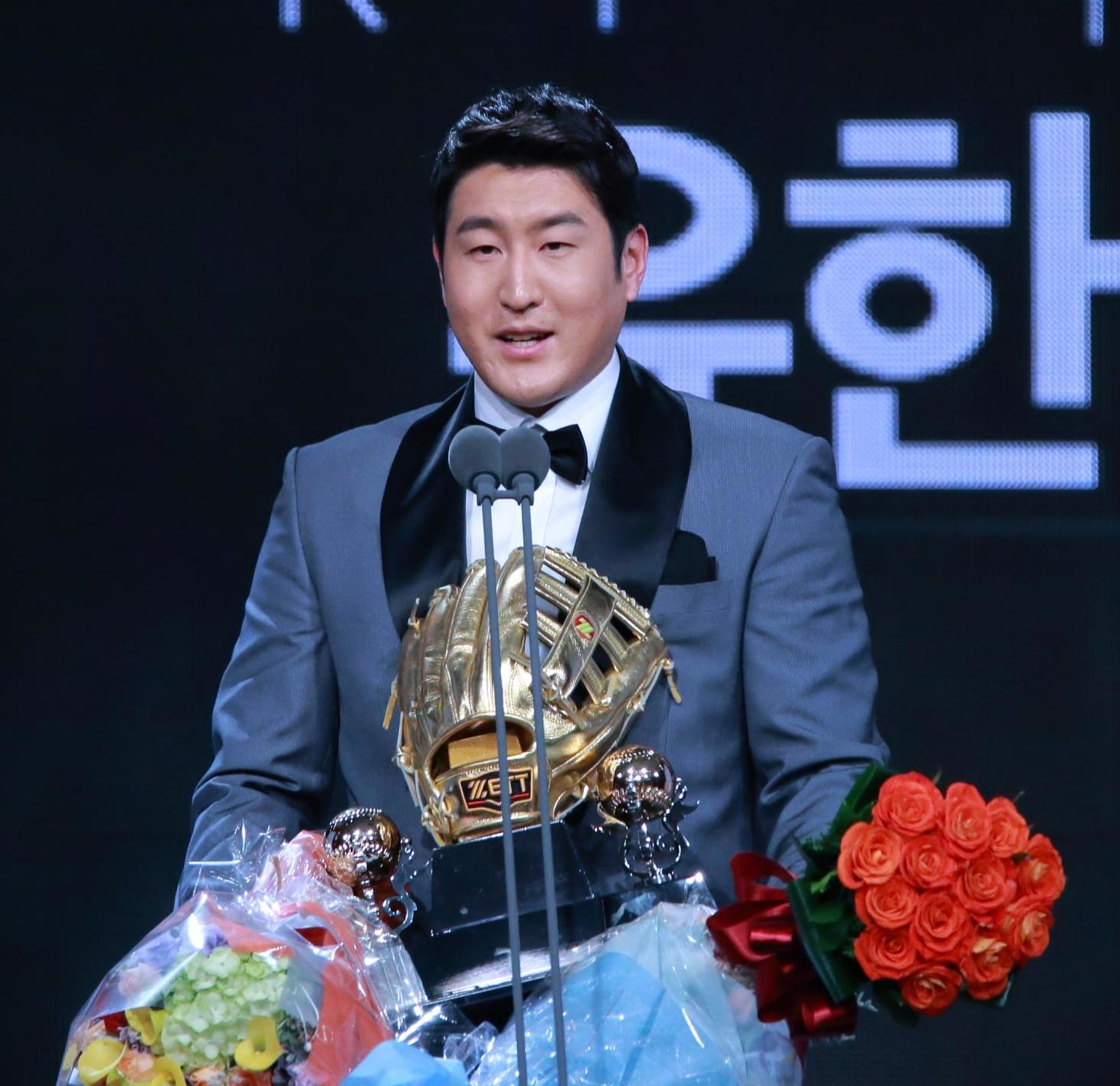

KT Wiz – No. 81
- Outfielder / Manager
- Born: July 1, 1981 (age 45)
- Batted: Right Threw: Right

KBO debut
- July 7, 2005, for the Hyundai Unicorns

Last appearance
- 2021, for the KT Wiz

KBO statistics
- Batting average: .302
- Home runs: 151
- Runs batted in: 883
- Stats at Baseball Reference

Teams
- As player: Hyundai Unicorns (2004–2007); Nexen Heroes (2008–2015); KT Wiz (2016–2021); As coach: KT Wiz 2nd Team (2023); KT Wiz (2023–2026); As manager: KT Wiz 2nd Team (2027–present)

Career highlights and awards
- KBO Golden Glove (2015)

Yoo Han-joon (Korean: 유한준; Hanja: 柳漢俊; born July 1, 1981 in Gochang County, North Jeolla) is a retired South Korean outfielder for the KT Wiz in the Korea Baseball Organization. He bats and throws right-handed.

== Amateur career ==
After graduating from Yushin High School, Yoo was drafted by the Hyundai Unicorns in the second round (20th overall) of the 2000 KBO Draft. Yoo did not sign with them; instead he opted for college, attending Dongguk University. Yoo was a four-year starting third baseman for Dongguk University from 2000-2003. As a junior in 2002, Yoo was selected for the South Korean national team in the Intercontinental Cup held in Havana, Cuba, where he played mostly as a backup third baseman behind Hanwha Eagles star Lee Bum-Ho.

=== Notable international careers ===
Year	Venue	Competition	Team
2002	Cuba	Intercontinental Cup	Silver medal

== Professional career ==
In 2004, Yoo made his KBO pro league debut in the Hyundai Unicorns. The Unicorns assigned him to the Unicorns second team for the 2004 season.

Yoo was promoted to the first team in the 2005 season but only batted .192 with 5 hits in 26 at-bats in 18 games.

After the 2005 season, Yoo converted his position to third baseman to outfielder. In 2006, his first season as an outfielder, Yoo became a fixture in right field of the Unicorns.

In 2007, Yoo hit .223 with 5 home runs and 35 RBI for the Unicorns. He missed the next two years due to military service.

In 2010, Yoo returned to baseball with the Nexen Heroes. On May 19, Yoo gained notability with his performance against the SK Wyverns, tying the all-time single-game record for RBI. In that game, he drove in 8 runs, going 5-for-6 with 2 home runs. As a consistent full-time outfielder, Yoo finished the season with career-bests in all offensive categories, ranked 4th in the KBO league in at-bats (481), 7th in hits (140), 8th in doubles (27), 12th in RBI (79) and 22nd in batting average (.291). After the 2010 season, Yoo was selected for the South Korea national baseball team to compete in the Intercontinental Cup held in Taichung.

In 2021, Yoo retired from professional baseball.

=== Notable international careers ===
Year	Venue	Competition	Team	Individual note
2007	Chinese Taipei	Baseball World Cup	5th	.212 (7-for-33), 6 RBI, 4 R
2010	Chinese Taipei	Intercontinental Cup	6th	.321 (9-for-28), 4 RBI, 3 R
