= Mel Rojas Jr. =

American baseball player (born 1990)

Mel Rojas Jr
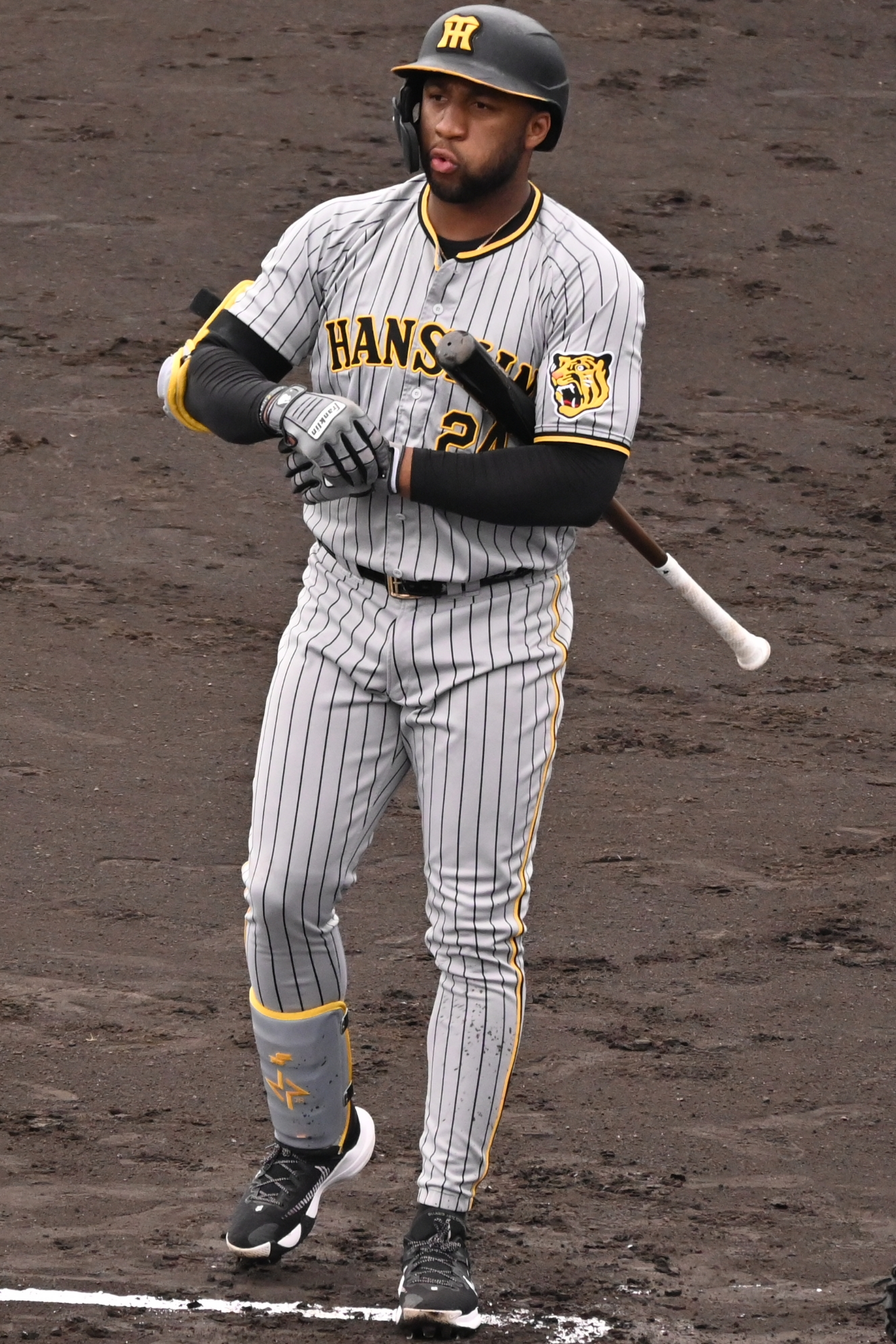
- Rojas with the Hanshin Tigers

Guerreros de Oaxaca – No. 24
- Outfielder
- Born: May 24, 1990 (age 36); Indianapolis, Indiana, U.S.
- Bats: Switch Throws: Right

Professional debut
- KBO: June 13, 2017, for the KT Wiz
- NPB: May 8, 2021, for the Hanshin Tigers

KBO statistics (through 2025 season)
- Batting average: .313
- Home runs: 178
- Runs batted in: 564

NPB statistics (through 2022 season)
- Batting average: .220
- Home runs: 17
- Runs batted in: 48
- Stats at Baseball Reference

Teams
- KT Wiz (2017–2020); Hanshin Tigers (2021–2022); KT Wiz (2024–2025)

Career highlights and awards
- KBO: 2× KBO Golden Gloves Award (2019–2020); KBO MVP (2020); 1× KBO Home Run Leader (2020); 1× KBO RBI Leader (2020); 1× KBO Runs scored Leader (2020)

Mel Rojas Jr. (born May 24, 1990) is a Dominican American professional baseball outfielder for the Guerreros de Oaxaca of the Mexican League. He has previously played in the KBO League for the KT Wiz and in Nippon Professional Baseball (NPB) for the Hanshin Tigers.

== Early life ==
Rojas was born in Indianapolis in 1990 when his father, Mel Rojas, was playing for the Indianapolis Indians. A member of the Alou family, he was raised in the Dominican Republic. As a child, he played both baseball and basketball. He attended high school in Mt. Carmel, Illinois.

=== College ===
Rojas played junior college baseball at Wabash Valley College where, in his only season, he led the nation with 61 stolen base in 64 attempts. He was named the 2010 Great Rivers Athletic Conference Freshman of the Year. He played two summers of collegiate summer baseball with the Amsterdam Mohawks of the New York Collegiate Baseball League.

== Career ==
=== Pittsburgh Pirates ===
Rojas was drafted by the Pittsburgh Pirates in the third round of the 2010 Major League Baseball draft out of Wabash Valley College. He signed with the Pirates and made his professional debut that season with the State College Spikes.

In 2011, Rojas spent the season with the West Virginia Power. In 2012, Rojas spent the season with Bradenton Marauders. In 2013, Rojas spent the season with the Double-A Altoona Curve.

In 2014, Rojas started the season with Altoona and was promoted to the Triple-A Indianapolis Indians in July.

In 2015, the Pirates invited Rojas to spring training. Cut from the team in March, Rojas began the season at the Triple-A level. After a midseason demotion to the Curve, Rojas rejoined the Indians in September.

=== Atlanta Braves ===
On May 9, 2016, Rojas was traded to the Atlanta Braves for cash considerations. He was assigned to the Double-A Mississippi Braves, and promoted to the Triple-A Gwinnett Braves seven weeks later. Rojas finished his 2016 season batting .253 with 12 home runs and 46 RBIs.

=== KT Wiz ===
On June 12, 2017, Rojas signed with the KT Wiz of the KBO League for $400,000. On November 14, 2017, he re-signed with KT Wiz for $1,000,000.

In 2018 he broke the KT Wiz franchise record for home runs with 43.

In 2020, he also signed a $1.5 million contract, staying at KT Wiz. Rojas nearly won the batting Triple Crown, leading the league in home runs (47) and RBIs (135), but coming in third place for batting average (.349). He was later voted the 2020 KBO League MVP.

=== Hanshin Tigers ===
On December 8, 2020, Rojas signed a two-year deal with the Hanshin Tigers of Nippon Professional Baseball. He played in 60 games for Hanshin in 2021, hitting .217/.282/.381 with 8 home runs and 21 RBI. In 2022, Rojas appeared in 89 contests for the Tigers, slashing .224/.322/.410 with 9 home runs and 27 RBI. He became a free agent following the 2022 season.

=== Toros de Tijuana ===
On March 6, 2023, Rojas signed with the Toros de Tijuana of the Mexican League. In 7 games for Tijuana, he hit .276/.344/.448 with one home run and two RBI. Rojas was released by the Toros on May 5.

=== Acereros de Monclova ===
On May 10, 2023, Rojas signed with the Acereros de Monclova of the Mexican League. In 36 games, he batted .241/.440/.397 with 5 home runs and 20 RBI. Rojas was waived on July 4.

=== Guerreros de Oaxaca ===
On July 11, 2023, Rojas signed with the Guerreros de Oaxaca of the Mexican League. In 23 games for Oaxaca, Rojas hit .326/.419/.607 with 5 home runs and 25 RBI.

=== KT Wiz (second stint) ===
On December 7, 2023, Rojas signed with the KT Wiz of the KBO League. In 144 games for the team in 2024, he slashed .329/.421/.568 with 32 home runs and 112 RBI.

On December 3, 2024, Rojas re-signed with the Wiz on a $1.8 million contract. He played in 95 games for the team in 2025, slashing .239/.333/.426 with 14 home runs and 43 RBI. On August 3, 2025, Rojas was released by the team following the signing of Andrew Stevenson.

=== Guerreros de Oaxaca (second stint) ===
On March 9, 2026, Rojas signed with the Guerreros de Oaxaca of the Mexican League.

== Personal life ==
Rojas is the son of former Major League Baseball player, Mel Rojas.
