= Kim Min-hyuck =

South Korean baseball player (born 1995)

KT Wiz – No. 53
- Outfielder
- Born: November 21, 1995 (age 30); Suncheon, South Korea
- Bats: Left Throws: Right

KBO debut
- April 1, 2015, for the KT Wiz

Career statistics (through June 1, 2024)
- Batting average: .283
- Home runs: 9
- Runs batted in: 177
- Stats at Baseball Reference

Teams
- KT Wiz (2015–present)

Kim Min-hyuck (Korean: 김민혁; born November 21, 1995, in Suncheon, South Jeolla) is a South Korean outfielder for the KT Wiz in the Korea Baseball Organization.
