= Oh Tae-gon =

SSG Landers – No. 37
- First baseman
- Born: November 18, 1991 (age 34); Seoul, South Korea
- Bats: right Throws: Right

KBO debut
- September 22, 2011, for the Lotte Giants

KBO statistics (through 2025)
- Batting average: .257
- Home runs: 78
- Runs batted in: 354
- Stats at Baseball Reference

Teams
- Lotte Giants (2011, 2014–2017); KT Wiz (2017–2020); SK Wyverns / SSG Landers (2020–present)

- Oh Tae-gon
- Hangul: 오태곤
- Hanja: 吳太坤
- RR: O Taegon
- MR: O T'aegon

Oh Tae-gon (Korean: 오태곤; born November 18, 1991) is the infielder of KT Wiz of the KBO League. He joined Lotte Giants in 2010. He transferred to KT Wiz in 2017. The name before renaming is 'Oh Seung-taek (Korean: 오승택)'. He graduated Cheongwon High school.
