= Lee Young-ha (baseball) =

South Korean baseball player (born 1997)

Doosan Bears – No. 50
- Pitcher
- Born: 1 November 1997 (age 29); Seoul, South Korea
- Bats: Right Throws: Right

KBO debut
- May 19, 2017, for the Doosan Bears

KBO statistics (through 2025 season)
- Win–loss record: 60–46
- Earned run average: 4.71
- Strikeouts: 586
- Stats at Baseball Reference

Teams
- Doosan Bears (2017–present)

Career highlights and awards
- Korean Series champion (2019); KBO All-Star (2026)
Medals
Men's baseball
Representing South Korea
U-18 Baseball World Cup
Bronze medal – third place	2015 Osaka	Team
WBSC Premier12
Silver medal – second place	2019 WBSC Premier12	Team

Lee Young-ha (Korean: 이영하; nicknamed 불가사리 "The Starfish", born 1 November 1997) is a South Korean professional baseball pitcher for the Doosan Bears of the KBO League. He graduated from Sunrin Internet High School and was selected for the Doosan Bears by the first draft in 2016. He joined the Doosan Bears in 2017.
