= José Miguel Fernández =

Cuban baseball player (born 1988)

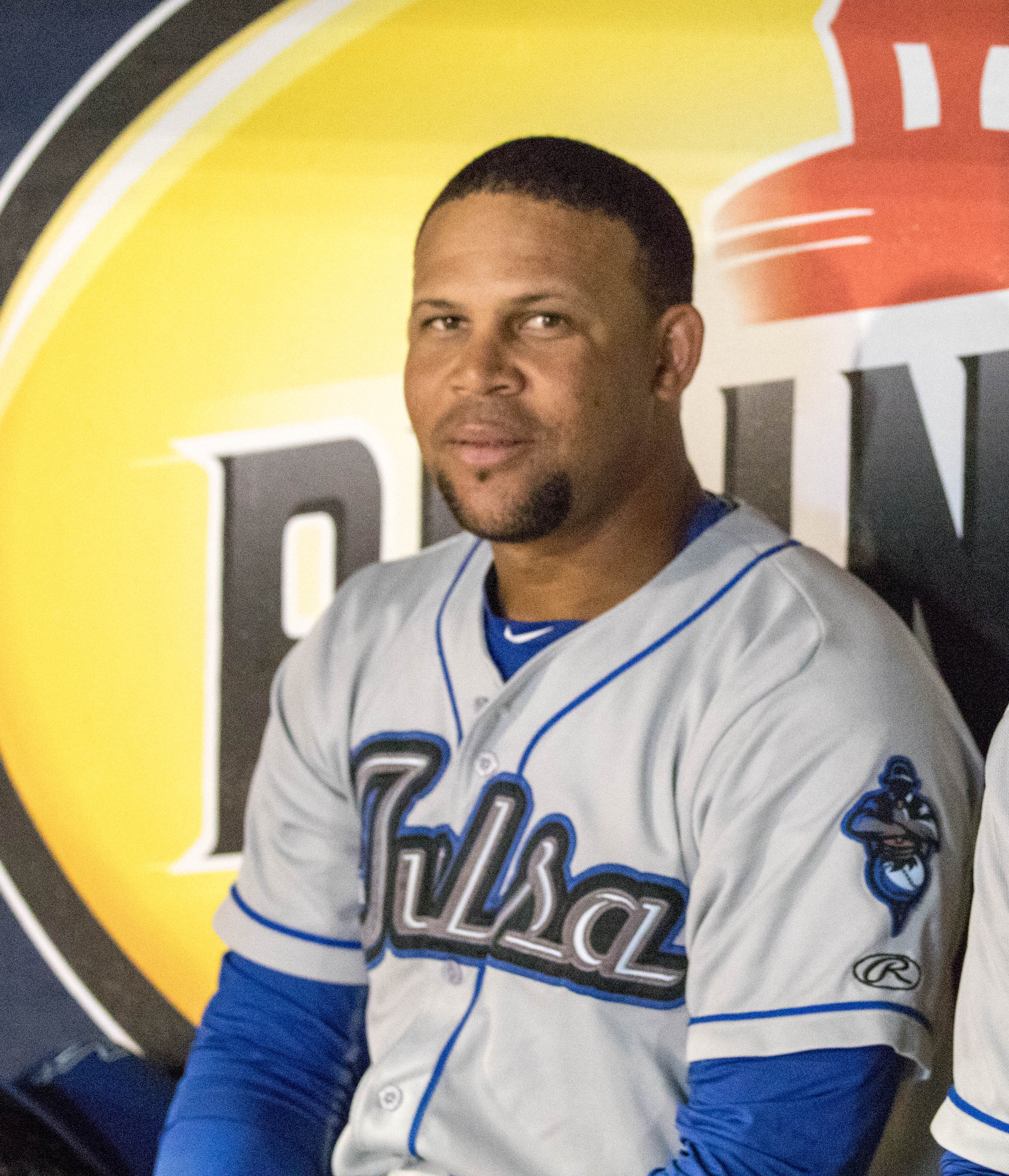
- Fernández with the Tulsa Drillers
- Infielder
- Born: April 27, 1988 (age 38); Colón, Cuba
- Batted: Left Threw: Right

Professional debut
- MLB: June 8, 2018, for the Los Angeles Angels
- KBO: March 23, 2019, for the Doosan Bears

Last appearance
- MLB: September 29, 2018, for the Los Angeles Angels
- KBO: October 8, 2022, for the Doosan Bears

MLB statistics
- Batting average: .267
- Home runs: 2
- Runs batted in: 11

KBO statistics
- Batting average: .328
- Home runs: 57
- Runs batted in: 351
- Stats at Baseball Reference

Teams
- Los Angeles Angels (2018); Doosan Bears (2019–2022)

Career highlights and awards
- KBO: KBO League Golden Glove Award (2019); Korean Series champion (2019)
Medals
Men's baseball
Representing Cuba
World Port Tournament
Gold medal – first place	2013 Rotterdam	Team

José Miguel Fernández (born April 27, 1988) is a Cuban former professional baseball infielder. He previously played in Major League Baseball (MLB) for the Los Angeles Angels, in the KBO League for the Doosan Bears, and for the Cuban national baseball team at the 2013 World Baseball Classic (WBC).

== Professional career ==
=== Cuban career ===
Fernández played for Matanzas in the Cuban National Series (CNS). In the 2014-15 season, he batted .326 with a .482 on-base percentage (OBP), .456 slugging percentage (SLG), 65 walks and 10 strikeouts in 314 plate appearances, ranking second in the league in OBP. Baseball America ranked him as the #3 Cuban player in April 2015. With a notoriety as contact hitter, Fernández struck out 113 times in 2,580 career CNS plate appearances, a 4.3 percent rate, compared with a 10.1 percent walk rate (263 total walks). For his career in Cuba, Fernández batted .319 with a .403 OBP and .423 SLG. In the 2013 World Baseball Classic (WBC), he took 21 turns at the plate, batting .524 with a .545 OBP and .667 SLG without striking out.

He did not play in any professional games in 2015 – including the CNS – as he was suspended for previously attempting to defect from Cuba and remained under heavy police guard. On December 2, 2015, reports emerged that he had defected from Cuba. However, at that time, he had yet to establish residency in another country, and still required clearance from Major League Baseball (MLB) to sign a free agent contract with a major league club.

=== Los Angeles Dodgers ===
On January 11, 2017, it was officially announced that he had signed a minor league contract with the Los Angeles Dodgers. The Dodgers assigned him to the Double-A Tulsa Drillers of the Texas League to start the 2017 season. He played in 90 games for them, with a .306 average, 16 homers and 64 RBI. He was released by the Dodgers on November 14, 2017.

=== Los Angeles Angels ===
On January 4, 2018, he signed a minor league contract with the Los Angeles Angels organization. He was assigned to the Triple-A Salt Lake Bees to begin the year. On June 8, 2018, Fernández was selected to the 40-man roster and promoted to the major leagues for the first time. He went 1-for-3 in his debut and played in 36 games for the Angels in his rookie season, logging a .267/.309/.388 slash line with 2 home runs and 11 RBI. On November 20, 2018, Fernández was designated for assignment by the Angels. Fernández was granted his unconditional release on November 21, 2018.

=== Doosan Bears ===
On December 26, 2018, Fernández signed a one-year, $700,000 contract with the Doosan Bears of the Korea Baseball Organization. In 2019, Fernández won the KBO League Korean Series final with Doosan, and was awarded a Gold Glove Award after the year. He also led the KBO in hits, with 197, and placed second in the regular season batting standings, with a .344 average.

Fernández re-signed with Doosan for the 2020 season, and slashed .340/.404/.497 with career-highs in home runs (21) and RBI (105). On December 23, 2020, Fernández again re-signed with the Bears for the 2021 season. He became a free agent following the 2022 season.

=== Saraperos de Saltillo ===
On January 9, 2023, Fernández signed with the Saraperos de Saltillo of the Mexican League. In nine appearances for Saltillo, he batted .219/.324/.406 with two home runs and three RBI. Fernández was released by the Saraperos on May 2.

== See also ==
- List of baseball players who defected from Cuba
