= Jared Hoying =

American baseball player (born 1989)

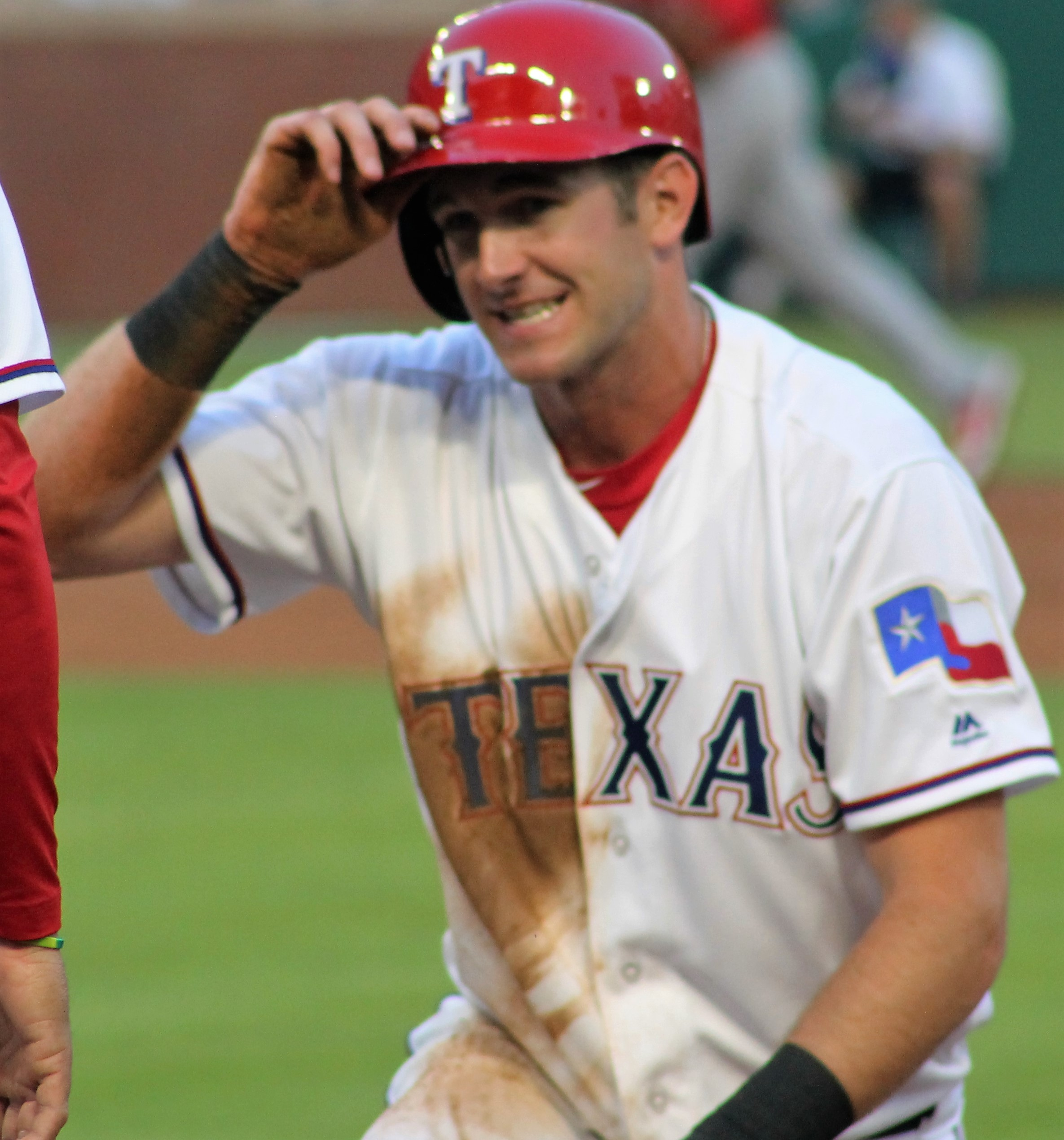
- Hoying during a game in Texas in May 2016
- Outfielder
- Born: May 18, 1989 (age 35); Fort Loramie, Ohio, U.S.
- Batted: Left Threw: Right

Professional debut
- MLB: May 23, 2016, for the Texas Rangers
- KBO: March 21, 2018, for the Hanwha Eagles

Last appearance
- MLB: June 19, 2021, for the Toronto Blue Jays
- KBO: October 30, 2021, for the Hanwha Eagles

MLB statistics
- Batting average: .215
- Home runs: 1
- Runs batted in: 12

KBO statistics
- Batting average: .276
- Home runs: 63
- Runs batted in: 249
- Stats at Baseball Reference

Teams
- Texas Rangers (2016–2017); Hanwha Eagles (2018–2020); Toronto Blue Jays (2021); KT Wiz (2021)

Career highlights and awards
- Korean Series champion (2021)

Jared William Hoying (born May 18, 1989) is an American former professional baseball outfielder. He played in Major League Baseball (MLB) for the Texas Rangers and Toronto Blue Jays. He also played in the KBO League for the Hanwha Eagles and KT Wiz.

== Career ==
=== Amateur career ===
Prior to playing professionally, he attended Fort Loramie High School where he won a state championship in 2007 and then the University of Toledo.

=== Texas Rangers ===
He was taken by the Texas Rangers in the 10th round of the 2010 MLB draft and began his professional career that season. In 2010, he hit .325, had an on-base percentage of .378 and slugged .543 with ten home runs, 20 stolen bases and 79 hits in 62 games for the Low-A Spokane Indians. He was a Northwest League All-Star and was named the league's Most Valuable Player. In 2011, Hoying played for the High-A Myrtle Beach Pelicans, slashing .236/.321/.355 with 5 home runs and 45 RBI. The following year, he split the season between Myrtle Beach and the Double-A Frisco RoughRiders, posting a cumulative .276/.341/.390 slash line with 8 home runs and 42 RBI. After steadily moving through the Rangers' minor league system, Hoying reached Triple-A for the first time with the Round Rock Express in 2013, and hit .255 in 93 games between Frisco and Round Rock. In 2014, Hoying was selected to the Pacific Coast League All-Star team. On August 31, Hoying became the first Round Rock Express player to have a 20 HR-20 SB season since Cody Ransom in 2007, finishing the year hitting .271/.325/.517 with 26 home runs and 78 RBI. Hoying hit .214/.263/.433 with 23 home runs, 60 RBI, and 20 stolen bases in 2015 for Round Rock.

Hoying was called up to the Major Leagues on May 23, 2016, and made his MLB debut that night. Hoying hit .217 with five RBI over 38 games in his rookie season for Texas in 2016, and spent most of the season in Round Rock, where he hit .269/.336/.474 with 16 home runs, 66 RBI, and 18 stolen bases. On December 2, the Rangers non-tendered Hoying, making him a free agent.

On December 13, 2016, Hoying re-signed with the Rangers organization on a minor league contract. On May 16, 2017, the Rangers selected Hoying's contract, adding him to the active roster. He hit .222 with one home run and seven RBI in 36 games for Texas in 2017. He spent the majority of the 2017 season in Round Rock, and hit .262/.323/.421 with 10 home runs, 44 RBI, and 16 stolen bases. On October 10, Hoying was removed from the 40-man roster and sent outright to Round Rock. He elected free agency following the season on November 6.

=== Hanwha Eagles ===
On November 21, 2017, Hoying signed a minor league contract with the Los Angeles Angels organization. He requested his release from the Angels organization in mid December in order to pursue a playing opportunity in South Korea, and was released on December 18. On December 18, 2017, Hoying signed a one-year, $700,000 contract with the Hanwha Eagles of the KBO League. Hoying produced a .306/.373/.573 batting line with 30 home runs in his first season in Korea. Hoying re-signed with the Hanwha Eagles for the 2019 season, on a one-year contract worth $1.4MM. In 2019, Hoying hit .284/.343/.460/.803 with 18 home runs and 73 RBI. Hoying re-signed with Hanwha for the 2020 season, on a $850,000 contract. On June 22, 2020, after hitting only .194 in 34 games, Hoying was waived by the Eagles.

=== Toronto Blue Jays ===
On May 30, 2021, Hoying signed a minor league contract with the Toronto Blue Jays organization. On June 17, he was selected to the active roster. Hoying made his first appearance with the Blue Jays as a pinch hitter on June 18, 2021. He started his first game as a Blue Jay on June 19, 2021, playing left field. On June 22, Hoying was outrighted off of the 40-man roster and assigned to the Triple-A Buffalo Bisons. However, Hoying rejected the assignment and elected free agency two days later.

=== KT Wiz ===
On June 26, 2021, Hoying signed with the KT Wiz of the KBO League. In 68 games, he hit .239/.313/.417 with 11 home runs and 52 RBI. Hoying was not re-signed for the 2022 season and became a free agent.
