= 2016 Korean Series =

Team (Wins)	Managers	Season
Doosan Bears (4)	Kim Tae-hyoung	(1) 93–1–50, .650, 9 GA
NC Dinos (0)	Kim Kyung-moon	(2) 83–3–58, .538, 9 GB
- Dates: October 29–November 2
- MVP: Yang Eui-ji

The 2016 Korean Series was the championship series of the 2016 KBO League season. The Doosan Bears, as the regular season champions, automatically advanced to the Korean Series. They played against the winner of the playoff series, the NC Dinos, who defeated the LG Twins.

Doosan won the first four games of the best-of-seven series, winning their fifth Korean Series title.

== Roster ==
Doosan Bears
Roster
Pitchers: 40 Dustin Nippert; 29 Yoo Hee-kwan; 28 Chang Won-jun; 57 Lee Hyeon-ho; 61 Ham Deok-ju; 48 Lee Hyun-seung; 11 Yoon Myung-june; 18 Kim Kang-ryul; 26 Michael Bowden; 27 Hong Sang-sam; 45 Lee Yong-chan; 51 Kim Sung-bae	Catchers: 25 Yang Eui-ji; 12 Choi Jae-hoon; 47 Park Sei-hyok; Infielders: 13 Hur Kyoung-min; 52 Kim Jae-ho; 24 Oh Jae-won; 36 Oh Jae-il; 44 Nick Evans; 7 Choi Ju-hwan; 8 Ryu Ji-hyuk; 16 Lee Won-suk	Outfielders: 49 Min Byung-hun; 37 Park Keon-u; 32 Kim Jae-hwan; 31 Jung Soo-bin; 15 Kook Hae-seong	Manager: 88 Kim Tae-hyoung; Coaches: 89 Han Yong-deok; 82 Kang Yin-kwon; 76 Jang Won-jin; 87 Park Cheol-woo; 75 Kwon Myung-chul; 81 Kang Dong-woo; 77 Jeon Hyung-do; 86 Kang Seok-cheon

NC Dinos
Roster
Pitchers: 34 Eric Hacker; 31 Zach Stewart; 66 Choi Keum-kang; 29 Lee Min-ho; 55 Kim Jin-sung; 59 Koo Chang-mo; 46 Won Jong-hyun; 45 Lim Chang-min; 26 Lim Jung-ho; 50 Jang Hyun-sik; 41 Bae Jae-hwan	Catchers: 42 Kim Tae-goon; 23 Yong Deuk-han; Infielders: 2 Park Min-woo; 13 Son Si-hyun; 14 Eric Thames; 18 Park Sok-min; 27 Lee Ho-joon; 3 Mo Chang-min; 5 Lee Sang-ho; 10 Ji Seok-hun; 24 Cho Young-hun	Outfielders: 38 Kim Seong-uk; 39 Lee Jong-wook; 47 Na Sung-bum; 1 Kim Jun-wan; 9 Kim Jong-ho; 53 Kwon Hui-dong	Manager: 74 Kim Kyung-moon; Coaches: 88 Yang Seung-kwan; 78 Choi Yil-yeon; 77 Park Seung-ho; 70 Lee Dong-wook; 86 Koo Chun-suh; 80 Lee Kwang-kil; 72 Jeon Jun-ho; 73 Choi Gi-moon

== Summary ==
Doosan won the series, 4–0.

Game	Date	Score	Location	Time	Attendance
1	October 29	NC Dinos 0 – Doosan Bears 1 (11)	Jamsil Baseball Stadium	3:51	25,000
2	October 30	NC Dinos 1 – Doosan Bears 5	Jamsil Baseball Stadium	3:10	25,000
3	November 1	Doosan Bears 6 – NC Dinos 0	Masan Baseball Stadium	3:17	11,000
4	November 2	Doosan Bears 8 – NC Dinos 1	Masan Baseball Stadium	3:24	11,000

== Matchups ==
=== Game 1 ===
Saturday, October 29, 2016 2:01 pm (KST) at Jamsil Baseball Stadium in Seoul
Team	1	2	3	4	5	6	7	8	9	10	11	R	H	E
NC Dinos	0	0	0	0	0	0	0	0	0	0	0	0	3	0
Doosan Bears	0	0	0	0	0	0	0	0	0	0	1	1	11	1
WP: Lee Hyun-seung (1–0) LP: Lim Chang-min (0–1); Attendance: 25,000; Boxscore

Dustin Nippert started for Doosan and Zach Stewart started for the Dinos. Nippert did not allow a hit in his first six innings pitched. Doosan defeated the NC Dinos 1–0 in 11 innings in Game 1. Oh Jae-il hit the game-winning sacrifice fly for Doosan.

=== Game 2 ===
Sunday, October 30, 2016 1:59 pm (KST) at Jamsil Baseball Stadium in Seoul
Team	1	2	3	4	5	6	7	8	9	R	H	E
NC Dinos	0	0	0	0	0	0	0	1	0	1	10	0
Doosan Bears	0	0	0	1	0	0	0	4	X	5	9	0
WP: Chang Won-jun (1–0) LP: Eric Hacker (0–1); Home runs: NC: None; DOO: Kim Jae-hwan (1); Attendance: 25,000; Boxscore

=== Game 3 ===
Tuesday, November 1, 2016 6:30 pm (KST) at Masan Baseball Stadium in Changwon
Team	1	2	3	4	5	6	7	8	9	R	H	E
Doosan Bears	0	0	0	0	2	0	0	0	4	6	7	0
NC Dinos	0	0	0	0	0	0	0	0	0	0	3	0
WP: Michael Bowden (1–0) LP: Choi Keum-kang (0–1) Sv: Lee Yong-chan (1); Home runs: DOO: Kim Jae-hwan (2); NC: None; Attendance: 11,000; Boxscore

=== Game 4 ===
Wednesday, November 2, 2016 6:29 pm (KST) at Masan Baseball Stadium in Changwon
Team	1	2	3	4	5	6	7	8	9	R	H	E
Doosan Bears	0	1	0	0	0	3	0	0	4	8	14	0
NC Dinos	0	0	0	0	0	0	0	0	1	1	5	0
WP: Yoo Hee-kwan (1–0) LP: Zach Stewart (0–1); Home runs: DOO: Yang Eui-ji (1), Oh Jae-won (1); NC: Eric Thames (1); Attendance: 11,000; Boxscore

2016 Korean Series Champion

Doosan Bears
(Fifth title)

== See also ==
- 2016 KBO League season
- 2016 World Series
- 2016 Japan Series
