= 2017 Lotte Giants season =

2017 Lotte Giants
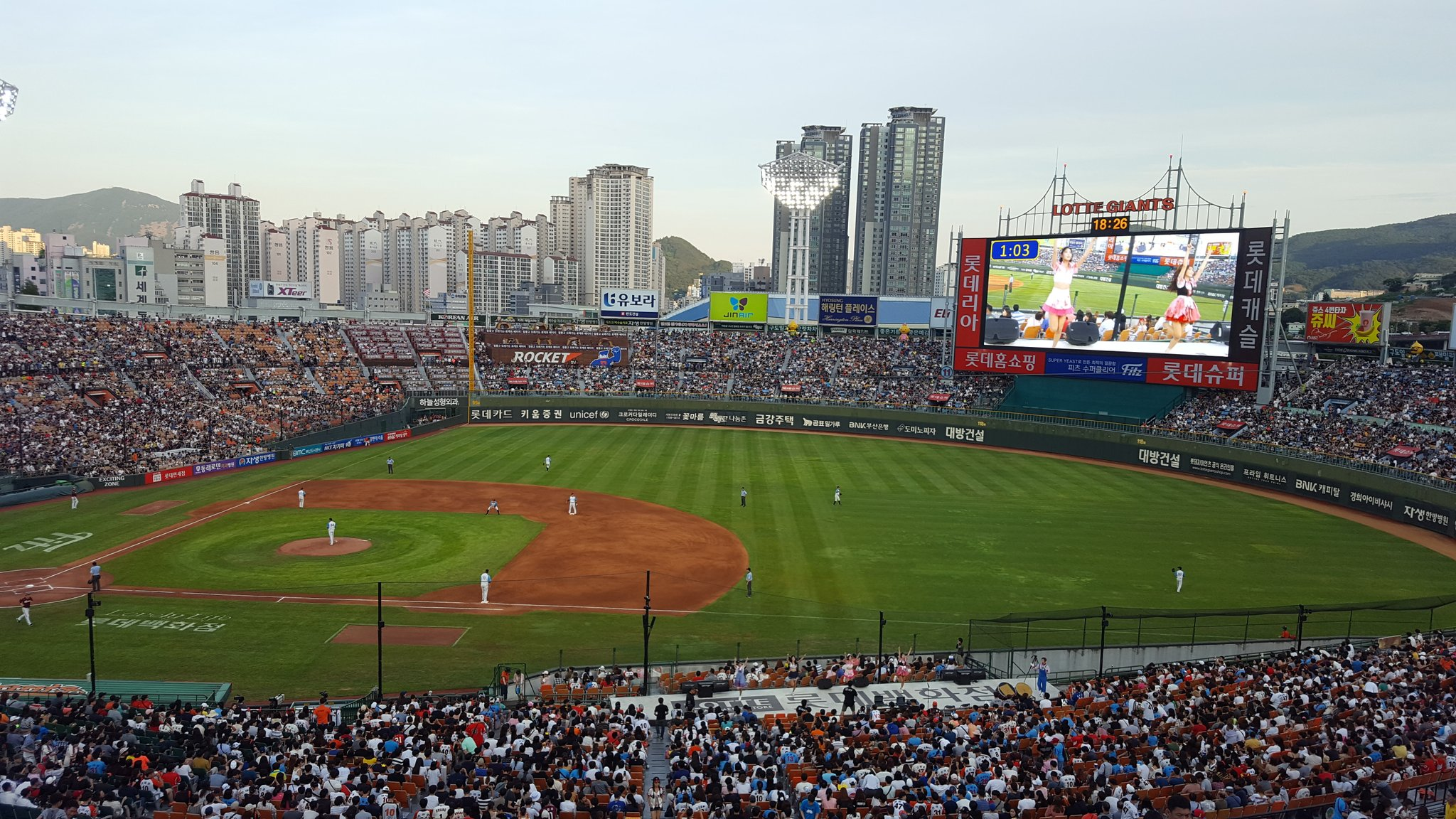
- Lotte Giants in Sajik Baseball Stadium on August 26, 2017.
- League: KBO League
- Ballpark: Sajik Stadium
- City: Busan
- Record: 80–62 (.563)
- League place: 3rd
- Owners: Lotte Giants Company Limited
- General manager: Gim Chang-rak
- Manager: Cho Won-woo

The 2017 Lotte Giants season features the Lotte Giants quest to win their first KBO League title since 1992.

== Regular season ==
=== Standings ===
Rank	Team	W	L	D	Pct.	GB	Postseason
1	KIA Tigers	87	56	1	.608	--	Korean Series
2	Doosan Bears	84	57	3	.596	2.0	Playoff
3	Lotte Giants	80	62	2	.563	6.5	Semi-playoff
4	NC Dinos	79	62	3	.560	7.0	Wild Card
5	SK Wyverns	75	68	1	.524	12.0	Wild Card
6	LG Twins	69	72	3	.489	17.0	Did not qualify
7	Nexen Heroes	69	73	2	.486	17.5	Did not qualify
8	Hanwha Eagles	61	81	2	.430	25.5	Did not qualify
9	Samsung Lions	55	84	5	.396	30.0	Did not qualify
10	KT Wiz	50	94	0	.347	37.5	Did not qualify

=== Record against opponents ===
Date: 2017-10-03
Team	Win	Loss	Tie
Doosan Bears	8	8	0
Hanwha Eagles	11	5	0
KIA Tigers	7	9	0
kt Wiz	11	5	0
LG Twins	8	7	1
NC Dinos	9	7	0
Nexen Heroes	10	6	0
Samsung Lions	7	8	1
SK Wyverns	9	7	0
Total	80	62	2

== Game log ==
Game Log (80–62) Home: 45-25 Away: 35-37
March/April (13–13) Home: 8–6 Away: 5–7

#	Date	Opponent	Score	Win	Loss	Save	Venue	Attendance	Record
1	March 31	NC Dinos	5–6	Manship (1–0)	**Raley** (0–1)	Lim (1)	Masan Stadium	11,000	33-32
2	April 1	NC Dinos	3–0	**Kim** (1–0)	Lee (0–1)	Son (1)	Masan Stadium	9,596	32-35
3	April 2	NC Dinos	12–4	**Bae** (1–0)	Koo (0–1)	—	Masan Stadium	11,000	37-31
4	April 4	Nexen Heroes	5–2	**Park** (1–0)	Choi (0–1)	—	**Sajik Stadium**	24,954	31-33
––	April 5	Nexen Heroes	Postponed (rain). Makeup date: September 23.						
5	April 6	Nexen Heroes	12–3	**Raley** (1–1)	Oh (0–1)	—	**Sajik Stadium**	3,864	37-34

Legend: = Win = Loss
Bold = Lotte Giants team member/home stadium
The source of postponed: KBO's press

== Postseason ==
=== Game log ===
2017 Postseason: 2−3 (Home 1−2; Away 1−1)
Semi Play-off Game: 2−3 (Home 1−2; Away 1−1)

#	Date	Opponent	Score	Win	Loss	Save	Venue	Attendance	Record
1	October 8	NC Dinos	2–9	Won (1–0)	**Park** (0–1)	—	**Sajik Stadium**	26,000	42–42
2	October 9	NC Dinos	1–0	**Raley** (1–0)	Jang (0–1)	Son (1)	**Sajik Stadium**	25,169	27–33
3	October 11	NC Dinos	6–13	Koo (1–0)	**Song** (0–1)	—	Masan Stadium	11,000	39–37
––	October 12	NC Dinos	Postponed (rain). Makeup date: October 13.						
4	October 13	NC Dinos	7–1	**Lindblom** (1–0)	Choi (0–1)	—	Masan Stadium	11,000	35–33
5	October 15	NC Dinos	0–9	Hacker (1–0)	**Park** (0–1)	—	**Sajik Stadium**	25,938	35–40

Legend: = Win = Loss
Bold = Lotte Giants team member/home stadium
