= Chang-min =

- Hangul: 창민
- RR: Changmin
- MR: Ch'angmin

Chang-min is a Korean given name.

People with this name include:

- Son Chang-min (born 1965), South Korean actor
- Choo Chang-min (born 1966), South Korean film director and screenwriter
- Lim Chang-min (born 1985), South Korean baseball player
- Mo Chang-min (born 1985), South Korean baseball player
- Lee Chang-min (singer) (born 1986), South Korean singer, member of boy band 2AM
- Max Changmin (born Shim Chang-min, 1988), South Korean singer and actor, member of boy band TVXQ
- Sim Chang-min (baseball) (born 1993), South Korean baseball player
- Lee Chang-min (footballer) (born 1994), South Korean football player

Fictional characters with this name include:

- Oh Chang-min, in 2014 South Korean television series Emergency Couple

== See also ==
- List of Korean given names
