= Korean Police Baseball Team =

2005–2019 South Korean baseball team

Police 경찰
Logo
Cap insignia

Information
- League: Futures League
- Location: Goyang, Gyeonggi-do
- Ballpark: Byeokje Baseball Stadium
- Founded: December 1, 2005; 20 years ago
- Folded: August 31, 2019; 7 years ago
- Colors: Blue and white
- Ownership: Seoul Metropolitan Police Agency
- Manager: Yoo Seung-an
- Coach: Lee Han-jin (pitching coach)

Current uniforms
Home	Away

Korean Police Baseball Team (Korean: 경찰 야구단) was a South Korean amateur baseball team that existed from 2005 to 2019, and competed in the KBO Futures League from 2006 through 2019. Their home stadium was Byeokje Baseball Stadium in Goyang. The team was controlled by the Seoul Metropolitan Police Agency, which itself is a division of the National Police Agency.

The Police were not affiliated with any single KBO League team, instead fielding a roster made of players from many of the KBO franchises. Over the Police team's history, however, it had a preponderance of players from the Doosan Bears franchise. Notable KBO League players who at one time served on the Police team included Choi Hyoung-woo, Yang Eui-ji, Min Byung-hun, Jung Soo-bin, Rhee Dae-eun, Son Seung-lak, and Won Jong-hyun.

== Structure ==
Many professional players who were serving compulsory military service played for the Police team, usually for a term of two seasons. Players were considered part of the auxiliary police, and completed their national duty as police officers after they finished recruit training.

The Korea Baseball Organization provided the Police team about 1.5 billion won ($1.3 million) in operating expenses each year.

== History ==
The Police team was the champion of the Northern League division of the Futures League in 2012, 2013, 2014, 2016, 2017, and 2018.

In 2017 the South Korean government announced it was abolishing the auxiliary police by the year 2023; the National Police Agency immediately stopped recruiting athletes and promised to disband its sports teams (including the Police team) by the following year. The Police team was disbanded after the 2019 Futures League season; the team played its final game on July 10, 2019, against the Hanwha Eagles Futures League team.

Altogether, more than 200 players fulfilled their military duties on the Police team during its existence.

== Notable former players ==
Name	Years played	KBO Team
Byeon Jin-su	2016–2017	Doosan Bears
Cho Young-hun	2008–2009	Samsung Lions
Choi Hyoung-woo	2006–2007	Samsung Lions
Choi Jae-hoon	2009–2011	Doosan Bears
Han Dong-min	2014–2016	SK Wyverns
Hong Sang-sam	2015–2016	Doosan Bears
Hur Kyoung-min	2010–2011	Doosan Bears
Jang Sung-woo	2012–2013	Lotte Giants
Jeon Jun-woo	2015–2016	Lotte Giants
Jung Soo-bin	2017–2018	Doosan Bears
Kim In-tae	2014–2015	Doosan Bears
Kim Kang-ryul	2009–2010	Doosan Bears
Kim Min-woo	2005–2007	Woori Heroes (Note: Before playing with the Police, played with the Hyundai Unicorns, who went defunct after the 2006 season)
Kim Tae-gun	2018–2019	NC Dinos
Kook Hae-seong	2009–2012	Doosan Bears
Min Byung-hun	2011–2012	Doosan Bears
Oh Jeong-bok	2012–2013	NC Dinos
Park Kun-woo	2011–2012	Doosan Bears
Rhee Dae-eun	2017–2018	KT Wiz
Son Seung-lak	2008–2009	Woori Heroes
Won Jong-hyun	2015	NC Dinos
Yang Eui-ji	2008–2009	Doosan Bears

== See also ==
- Korean Police FC
- Sangmu Phoenix
- Seoul Metropolitan Police Agency
