= Lee Ho-joon =

Lee Ho-joon may refer to:

- Lee Ho-joon (baseball)
- Lee Ho-joon (swimmer)
- Ri Ho-jun, North Korean sports shooter
