= Baek Dong-hoon =

South Korean baseball player

Baek Min-gi
- Outfielder
- Born: September 16, 1990 (age 35); Seoul, South Korea
- Batted: Right Threw: Right

KBO debut
- May 31, 2013, for the Lotte Giants

Last KBO appearance
- July 2, 2021, for the Doosan Bears

KBO statistics
- Batting average: .160
- Home runs: 1
- Runs batted in: 6

Teams
- Lotte Giants (2013–2015); Doosan Bears (2018–2021)

Baek Min-gi (Korean: 백민기; Hanja: 白珉基; born September 16, 1990) is a South Korean former outfielder for the Doosan Bears of the KBO League. He graduated from Chung-Ang University. He joined the Lotte Giants in the draft in 2013. He played in the Lotte Giants from 2013 to 2015. In 2017, he was named and traded as a compensation player for Min Byung-hun, who moved from Doosan Bears to Lotte Giants through the FA.

== Career stats ==
Year	Team	AVG	G	AB	H	R	2B	3B	HR	TB	RBI	SB	CS	BB	HBP	SO	GIDP	E
2013	Lotte Giants	0.111	30	18	7	2	0	0	0	2	0	4	2	0	0	8	0	0
2014	Lotte Giants	0.000	9	1	1	0	0	0	0	0	0	0	1	0	0	0	0	0
2015	Lotte Giants	0.000	8	7	1	0	0	0	0	0	0	0	0	1	1	1	0	0
2018	Doosan Bears	0.222	23	27	7	6	2	0	1	11	4	0	0	5	1	11	1	0
