= Jong-ho =

- Hangul: 종호
- RR: Jongho
- MR: Chongho

Jong-ho or Chong-ho is a Korean given name.

People with this name include:

- Choi Jong-ho (born 2000), South Korean singer and actor
- Ha Jong-ho (born 1963), South Korean boxer
- Kim Chong-hoh (1935–2018), South Korean politician
- Kim Jong-ho (baseball) (born 1984), South Korean baseball player
- Lee Jong-ho (footballer, born 1986), South Korean football player
- Lee Jong-ho (footballer, born 1992), South Korean football player
- Lee Jong-ho (engineer), South Korean electronic engineer
- Park Jong-ho (born 1973), South Korean baseball player
- Seo Jong-ho (born 1980), South Korean former field hockey player
- Song Jong-ho (born 1976), South Korean actor
- Song Jong-ho (sport shooter) (born 1990), South Korean sport shooter

== See also ==
- List of Korean given names
