= Yang Jong-min =

South Korean baseball player

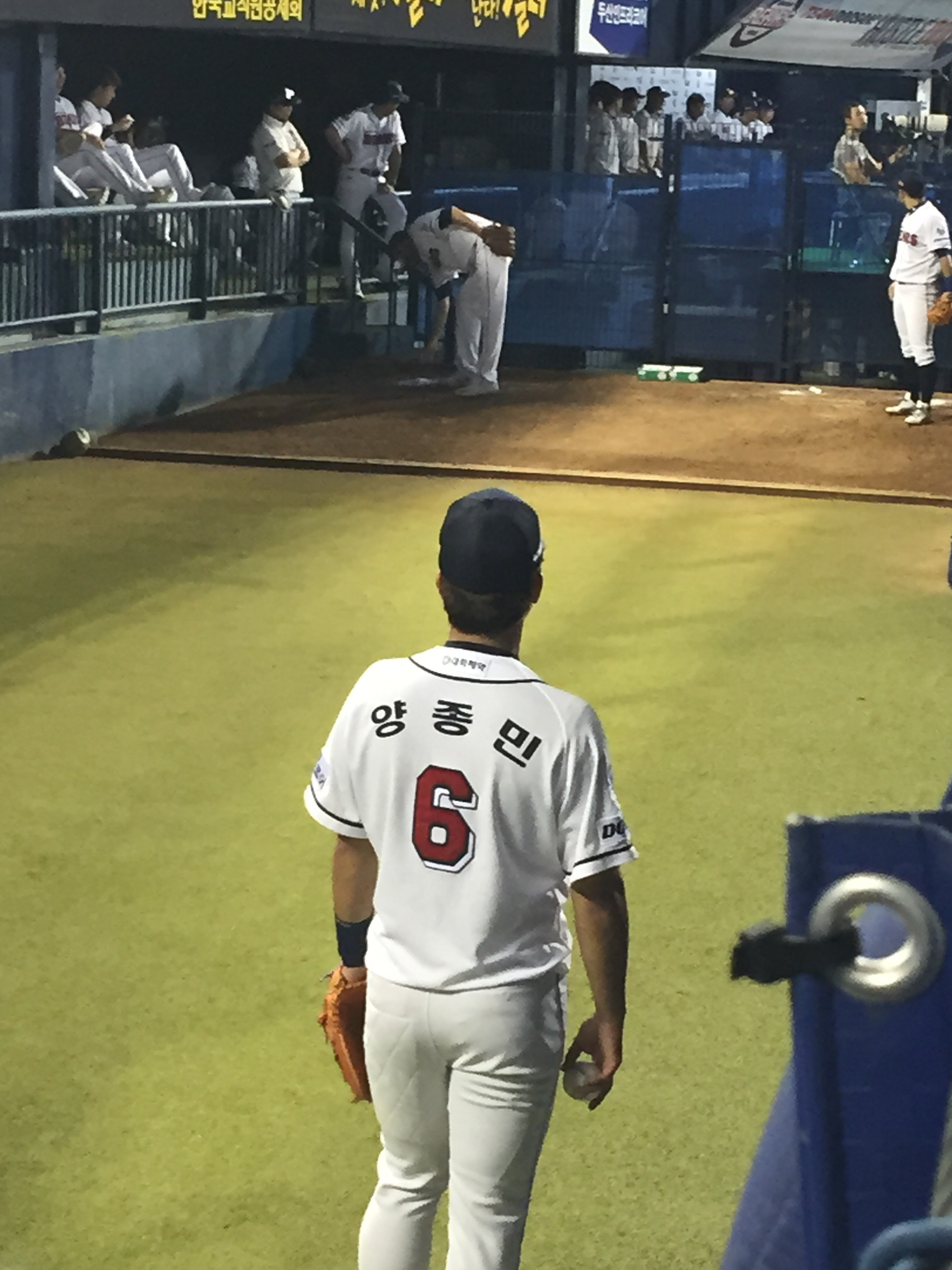

LG Twins – No. 63
- Infielder
- Born: October 9, 1990 (age 35); Seoul
- Bats: Right Throws: Right

KBO debut
- 2009, for the Lotte Giants
- Stats at Baseball Reference

Teams
- Lotte Giants (2009–2013); Doosan Bears (2014–2018); LG Twins (2019–present)

- Korean name
- Hangul: 양종민
- Hanja: 梁宗敏
- RR: Yang Jongmin
- MR: Yang Chongmin

Yang Jong-min (Korean: 양종민; born October 9, 1990, in Seoul) is a South Korean infielder who currently plays for the LG Twins of the KBO League. He joined the Lotte Giants in the draft in 2009 (2nd draft 2nd round). He played in the Lotte Giants from 2009 to 2013. He transferred baseball team from Lotte Giants to Doosan Bears in 2014.
