= Lee Jae-hak =

South Korean baseball player (born 1990)

NC Dinos – No. 51
- Pitcher
- Born: October 4, 1990 (age 35); Daegu, South Korea
- Bats: Right Throws: Right

KBO debut
- June 15, 2010, for the Doosan Bears

KBO statistics (through 2024)
- Win–loss record: 85–88
- Earned run average: 4.60
- Strikeouts: 1,205
- Stats at Baseball Reference

Teams
- Doosan Bears (2010); NC Dinos (2013–2024)

Career highlights and awards
- KBO Rookie of the Year (2013)

Lee Jae-hak (Korean: 이재학; Hanja: 李在學; born October 4, 1990, in Daegu, South Korea) is a South Korean professional baseball starting pitcher for the NC Dinos of the KBO League. He bats and throws right-handed.

== Amateur career ==
Lee attended Daegu High School from 2006 to 2009. In 2008, Lee led the school to its first-ever Phoenix Flag National Championship, the most prestigious national high school competition in South Korea. As a starting pitcher he earned Best Pitcher honors for the tourney as well. Lee helped his team win another major national tournament Blue Dragon Flag National Championship, and finished the 2008 season with a 0.94 ERA in 38 1/3 innings pitched.

In 2009 Lee posted a 1.35 ERA in 53 1/3 innings pitched. Although Daegu High School failed to make the finals in the national tournaments during the 2009 season, his high K/9 rate (10.97) subsequently drew the attention of KBO scouts.

== Professional career ==
In the 2010 KBO Draft, Lee was selected by the Doosan Bears as the tenth overall pick. Lee made his pro league debut against the LG Twins on June 15, 2010, coming on in relief, and earned his first KBO league win, hurling 2 2/3 scoreless innings. Lee struggled with his command through the 2010 season, however, posting a 5.01 ERA in 23 1/3 innings pitched as a relief pitcher.

Lee was sidelined with elbow injuries during the entire 2011 season. After the season, he was traded to the NC Dinos in the 2012 KBO Expansion Draft.

In 2012, Lee started his first season with the Dinos in the Futures League. During the 2012 season in the Futures League, he showed enough promise to be placed on the Dinos' starting rotation for their inaugural 2013 season, going 15–2 with a 1.55 ERA and 100 strikeouts.

Lee spent the Dinos' inaugural 2013 KBO campaign as a solid part of the starting rotation, alongside former MLB pitchers Charlie Shirek, Adam Wilk and Eric Hacker. Lee pitched his first complete game, a two-hit shutout, on July 31, 2013, against the SK Wyverns.

Lee underwent Tommy John surgery in 2025 after complaining of elbow pain during spring training.
