= Jin-soo =

- Hangul: 진수
- RR: Jinsu
- MR: Chinsu

Jin-soo is a Korean given name.

People with this name include:

- Jin Soo Kim (born 1950), South Korean-born American female multimedia artist
- Cho Jin-soo (born 1983), South Korean male football forward
- Park Jin-soo (born 1987), South Korean male football midfielder
- Choi Jin-soo (born 1989), South Korean male basketball player
- Choi Jin-soo (footballer) (born 1990), South Korean male football midfielder
- Kim Jin-su (born 1992), South Korean male football left back
- Byun Jin-soo (born 1993), South Korean male baseball pitcher

Fictional characters with this name include:

- Lee Jin-su, male character in 2002 South Korean film Over the Rainbow
- Jin-Soo Kwon, male character in 2004–2010 American television series Lost
- Jin-su, female character in 2007 South Korean film Le Grand Chef
- Kim Jin-soo, female character in 2008 South Korean television series Gourmet
- Lee Jin-soo, male character in 2010 South Korean television series Coffee House
- Jung Jin-soo, male character in 2013 South Korean film The Berlin File

== See also ==
- List of Korean given names
