= Oh Jeong-bok =

South Korean baseball player

- Outfielder
- Born: October 13, 1986 (age 39); Gimhae, South Korea
- Bats: Right Throws: Right

KBO debut
- 2009, for the Samsung Lions

- Korean name
- Hangul: 오정복
- Hanja: 吳正福
- RR: O Jeongbok
- MR: O Chŏngbok

Oh Jeong-bok (Korean: 오정복; born October 13, 1986) is a South Korean professional baseball outfielder. He joined Samsung Lions in 2009. After that, he belonged to NC Dinos in 2012, and he moved to Korean Police Baseball Team in 2012. He moved to NC Dinos again in 2014. Then he moved to KT Wiz in 2015. He graduated Inha University.
