= Kim Min-woo (infielder) =

South Korean baseball player

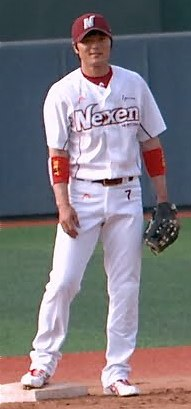

Kia Tigers – No. 75
- Third baseman / Defense coach
- Born: March 21, 1979 (age 46)
- Batted: Right Threw: Right

KBO debut
- 2002, for the Hyundai Unicorns

Last KBO appearance
- 2016, for the Kia Tigers

KBO statistics
- Batting average: .246
- Home runs: 32
- Runs batted in: 183
- Stolen bases: 83
- Stats at Baseball Reference

Teams
- Hyundai Unicorns (2002–2004); Woori / Nexen Heroes (2008–2013); Kia Tigers (2013–2016)

Career highlights and awards
- Korean Series champion (2003); KBO All-Star selection (2010)

Kim Min-woo (Korean: 김민우; Hanja: 金敏雨; born March 21, 1979, in Seoul, South Korea) is a retired South Korean infielder. He batted and threw right-handed.

== Amateur career ==
Upon graduation from high school, Kim, one of the top right-handed pitching prospects, was drafted by the Hyundai Unicorns in the second round of the 1998 KBO Draft, but he subsequently opted instead to enter Hanyang University and play college baseball.

In his freshman year, Kim converted from a pitcher to a position player, and next year he was selected for the South Korea national baseball team as an infielder and competed in the 1999 Intercontinental Cup.

As a senior in 2001, Kim helped lead Hanyang University to clinch the national collegiate championship, and competed in the Baseball World Cup and Asian Baseball Championship as a starting third baseman for the South Korean national team.

=== Notable international careers ===
Year	Venue	Competition	Team	Individual note
1999	Australia	Intercontinental Cup	7th	
2001	(Chinese Taipei) Taiwan	Asian Championship	Silver medal	
2001	Japan	Kobe 4-Nations Series	Bronze medal	.545 BA (6-for-11), 1 RBI, 2 SB
2001	(Chinese Taipei) Taiwan	World Cup	6th	

== Professional career ==
=== Hyundai Unicorns ===
Kim was signed by the Hyundai Unicorns in 2002. Prior to the 2002 KBO season, he tried to convert to a switch hitter. However, it ended up with a blunder, only batting .195 and striking out 20 times in 41 at-bats. In 2003, Kim spend most of his sophomore season in the reserve league, but was added to the Unicorns' first team after the September roster expansion and batted a respectable .368 (7-for-19). He was named to the Korean Series final roster and received a 2003 Korean Series champion ring.

In 2004, Kim fell into a horrendous slump again, batting only .125 and whiffing 14 times in only 48 at-bats. After the season, he decided to serve military service and played baseball in the Police Baseball Team as a military duty.

=== Nexen Heroes ===
Kim came back to the KBO League in 2008 when he finished the military service, but was on the Heroes' roster off and on for the 2008 season, batting a career-low .056 (1-for-18), playing in only 16 games as a substitute infielder or pinch hitter.

Kim batted a respectable .264 (33-for-125) with 3 home runs and 10 RBI in the 2009 season, appearing in 78 games as a backup infielder.

Kim hit the first home run of the 2010 KBO baseball season off Lotte Giants starter Ryan Sadowski, going 2-for-4 in the Heroes' opening game on March 27. He went 3-for-6 in the following game on March 28 before taking over as the 2010 Heroes' regular second baseman. In July, Kim moved his position to third base and became a permanent fixture as Heroes' franchise third baseman Hwang Jae-Gyun was traded to the Lotte Giants. Kim finished his first season as a full-time player with a .257 batting average, 9 home runs and 44 RBI, appearing in 128 games. He was ranked ninth in the KBO league in triples (3), tenth in stolen bases (28), eleventh in walks (70) and twelfth in at-bats (447), posting career-highs in most of the offensive categories.
