= Jang Sung-woo =

South Korean baseball player (born 1990)

KT Wiz – No. 22
- Catcher
- Born: January 17, 1990 (age 36); Busan, South Korea
- Bats: Right Throws: Right

KBO debut
- June 26, 2009, for the Lotte Giants

KBO statistics (through June 1, 2024)
- Batting average: .260
- Home runs: 105
- Runs batted in: 538
- Stats at Baseball Reference

Teams
- Lotte Giants (2009–2011, 2014–2015); KT Wiz (2015, 2017–present)

- Jang Sung-woo
- Hangul: 장성우
- Hanja: 張成宇
- RR: Jang Seongu
- MR: Chang Sŏngu

Jang Seong-woo (Korean: 장성우; born January 17, 1990) is the catcher of KT Wiz of the KBO League. He joined Lotte Giants in 2008. After that, he belonged to Korean Police Baseball Team in 2012, and he moved to Lotte Giants again in 2014. Then he moved to KT Wiz in 2015. He won the most RBI in the North Korean league in the Yakult Seven Pro Baseball Futures League in 2013. He graduated from Kyungnam High School.

== Controversy ==
After the 2015 season, his ex-girlfriend revealed his personal life, saying that Park Ki-ryang, a cheerleader for the Lotte Giants, was suing him and had no intention of reaching an agreement.

In the end, the club suspended him for 50 games and disciplined him for his volunteer work, making him unable to play in the early part of the 2016 season. In addition, back pain remained, so he ended the season without making it to the first division in 2016.
