= Kim Jong-ho =

Kim Jong-ho (Korean: 김종호) is the name of:

- Kim Chong-hoh (1935–2018), South Korean politician
- Kim Jong-ho (politician), North Korean politician
- Kim Jong-ho (baseball) (born 1984), South Korean baseball player
- Kim Jong-ho (archer) (born 1994), South Korean compound archer
