= Rhee Dae-eun =

South Korean baseball player

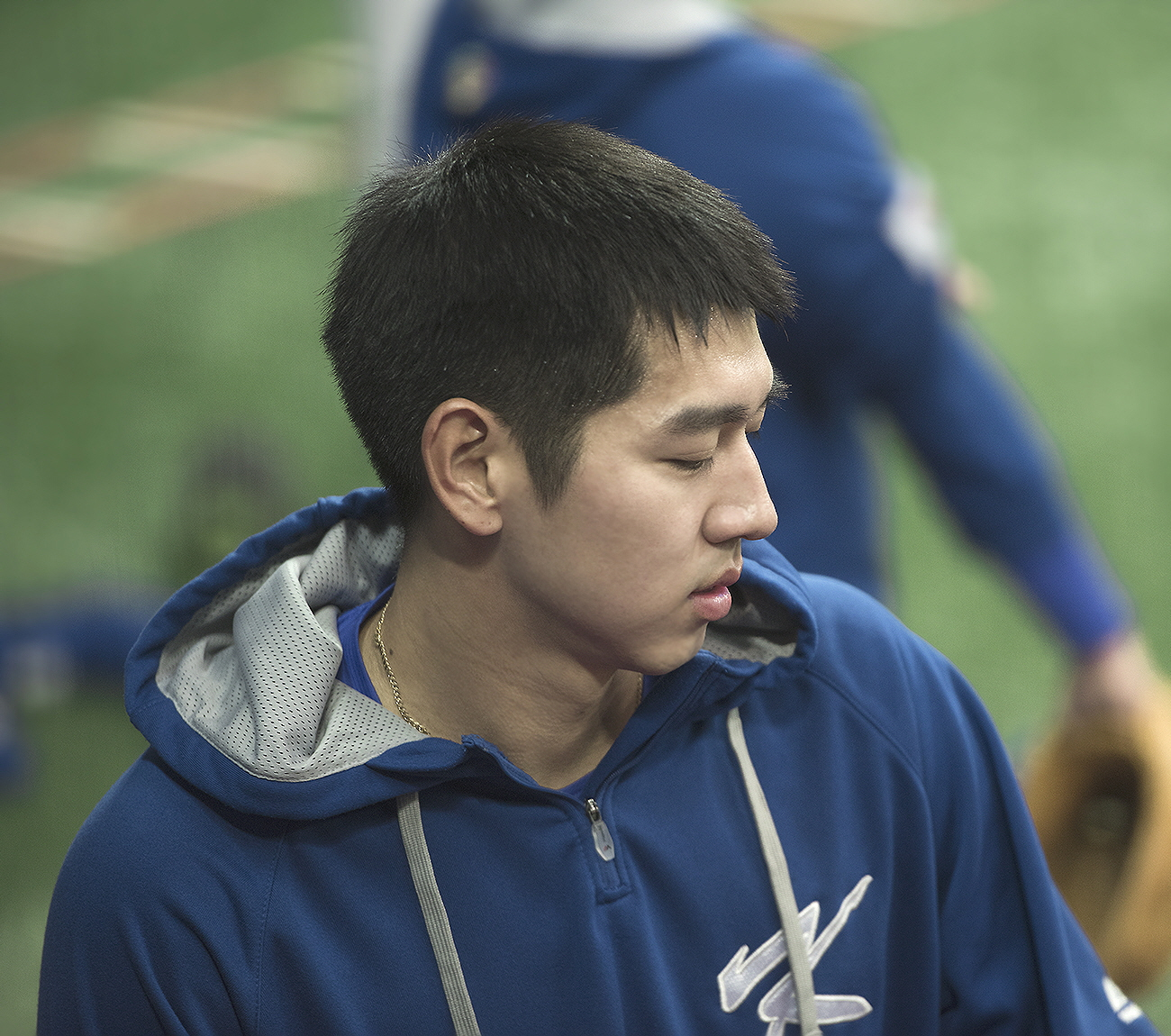

KT Wiz – No. 11
- Pitcher
- Born: 23 March 1989 (age 37); Seoul, South Korea
- Bats: Left Throws: Right

Professional debut
- NPB: March 29, 2015, for the Chiba Lotte Marines
- KBO: March 26, 2019, for the KT Wiz

NPB statistics (through 2016 season)
- Win–loss record: 9–9
- Earned run average: 3.97
- Strikeouts: 108

KBO statistics (through October 23, 2021)
- Win–loss record: 7-8
- Earned run average: 4.31
- Strikeouts: 96
- Stats at Baseball Reference

Teams
- Chiba Lotte Marines (2015–2016); Korean Police Baseball Team (2017–2018); KT Wiz (2019–2021)
Medals
Men's baseball
Representing South Korea
2015 WBSC Premier12
Gold medal – first place	2015 Tokyo	Team

- Rhee Dae-eun
- Hangul: 이대은
- Hanja: 李帶溵
- RR: I Daeeun
- MR: I Taeŭn

Rhee Dae-eun (Korean: 이대은; Hanja: 李帶溵; born March 23, 1989) is a South Korean former pitcher who last played for the KT Wiz.

== Career ==
=== Early years ===
Rhee was signed by the Chicago Cubs in 2007 out of high school. He spent seven seasons in the Cubs' minor league system, appearing in 135 games to compile a 40–37 record with a 4.08 ERA. Rhee was promoted as high as Triple-A Iowa in 2014, but was never called up to the major leagues.

He next spent two years with the Chiba Lotte Marines of the Nippon Professional Baseball (NPB), before pitching for the National Police Agency team of the KBO Futures League in South Korea during his mandatory military service. In the Futures League, Rhee compiled a 5–6 record in 18 appearances, posting a 3.83 ERA in 89 1/3 innings.

=== KT Wiz ===
On September 10, 2018, Rhee was picked #1 by the KT Wiz in the 2019 KBO Draft. He played as closer for the KT Wiz in the 2019 season. In three years with KT, Rhee appeared in 95 games, 83 as a relief pitcher. He compiled a 7-8 record with a 4.31 ERA and 17 saves.

Rhee announced his retirement from professional baseball in January 2022 at the age of 33.

=== International career ===
Rhee represented South Korea at the 2015 WBSC Premier12 tournament, starting against Venezuela in the group stage and Japan in the semifinals. He was included in the final roster for the 2017 World Baseball Classic but did not make an appearance.

== Personal life ==
He married rapper and Unpretty Rapstar winner Truedy on December 5, 2021, after three years of dating. The wedding was originally scheduled to take place in December of 2020, but was postponed due to the spread of COVID-19.

== Filmography ==
=== Television show ===
Year	Title	Role	Ref.
2021	King of Mask Singer	Contestant (Family Photo) Episode 337	
2022	Strongest Baseball	Participant	
2022	Our Cha Cha Cha	Cast Member	
2023	Golf Match Swing Star	Contestant	
2023	Couple Athlete's Village	Cast Member	

== Career statistics ==
Year	League	Team	W	L	W%	GS	CG	SHO	IP	H	R	ER	HR	BB	K	ERA	WHIP
2015	NPB	Lotte	9	9	.500	17	0	0	119.2	121	63	51	11	63	106	3.84	1.54
2016	NPB	Lotte	0	0	-	-	-	-	5	6	5	4	1	5	2	7.20	2.00
NPB Career			9	9	.500	17	0	0	124.2	127	68	55	12	68	108	3.97	1.56
2019	KBO	KT Wiz	4	2	.667	-	-	-	86	89	48	39	10	39	59	4.08	1.49
2020	KBO	KT Wiz	0	4	.000	-	-	-	29.1	36	23	19	4	13	15	5.83	1.67
2021	KBO	KT Wiz	3	2	.600	-	-	-	31	27	15	12	4	11	22	3.48	1.23
KBO Career			7	8	.467				146.1	152	86	70	18	63	96	4.31	1.47
