= Son Seung-lak =

South Korean baseball player

- Closer
- Born: March 4, 1982 (age 44)
- Batted: Right Threw: Right

KBO debut
- April 2, 2005, for the Hyundai Unicorns

Last KBO appearance
- October 1, 2019, for the Lotte Giants

KBO statistics
- Win–loss record: 45–49
- Earned run average: 3.64
- Strikeouts: 662
- Saves: 271
- Stats at Baseball Reference

Teams
- Hyundai Unicorns (2005–2006); Police Baseball Team (2008–2009); Nexen Heroes (2010–2015); Lotte Giants (2016–2019)

Career highlights and awards
- 4× KBO saves leader (2010, 2013–2014, 2017)

Son Seung-lak (Korean: 손승락; Hanja: 孫勝洛; born March 4, 1982, in Daegu) is a retired South Korean closer who played for the Hyundai Unicorns, the Nexen Heroes, and the Lotte Giants in the Korea Professional Baseball. He bats and throws right-handed.

== Amateur career ==
While attending Daegu High School, Son's main position was shortstop in the team. During his last season in Daegu High School, he occasionally appeared in games as a relief pitcher for the team and his 90+ mph fastball drew the attention of Korea Professional Baseball scouts, and he was drafted as a pitcher by the Hyundai Unicorns in 2001 in the 2nd round and as the 33rd pick overall.

However, Son decided to enter the Unicorns after graduation from college and continued to play baseball as a pitcher at Yeungnam University in Daegu. At Yeungnam University, he developed into one of the top collegiate pitchers along with Oh Seung-Hwan and Jang Won-Sam. As a sophomore in 2002, Son was called up to the Under-22 South Korea national team for the inaugural World University Baseball Championship held in Messina, Italy. In 2003, Son was selected for the South Korean national team as an amateur player and participated in the Baseball World Cup held in Havana, Cuba. At the World Cup, he led team in innings pitched with 18.1 and earned a save against Italy in the round-robin stage.

=== Notable international careers ===
Year	Venue	Competition	Team	Individual Note
2002	Italy	World University Championship	5th	
2003	Cuba	World Cup	8th	0–2, 1 SV; 3.93 ERA (4 G, 18.1 IP, 8 ER, 18 K)
2004	Taiwan	World University Championship	Bronze medal	

== Professional career ==
Signed by the Hyundai Unicorns upon graduation from college in 2005, Son entered the Korea Professional Baseball to high expectations, where many expected him to be the future ace of the Unicorns. He spent his rookie year as a full-time starting pitcher but went a disappointing 5–10 with a 5.43 ERA.

In 2006, Son started the season in the bullpen and occasionally appeared in games as a No.5 starter in the middle of the season. As a utility pitcher, he finished the season with a 6–5 record, 2 holds and an ERA of 4.17.

However, Son was sidelined with injuries for the whole 2007 season and after the season he left the team to perform two-year military duty. During the duty, Son played for the Police Baseball Team in the Korea Baseball Futures League on the side. In September 2009, he was selected for the South Korea national baseball team again and competed in the Baseball World Cup as a starting pitcher.

In 2010, Son came back to the pro baseball league after finishing the two-year military service. In the Nexen Heroes, which bought the right of the Hyundai Unicorns in 2008, Son made a transition to the closing job and posted a record of 2–3 with 26 saves and a 2.56 ERA. He led the KBO league in saves and became the first Hero to win a title in any individual categories.

Son had another strong season as a KBO top closer in 2011 when he had a career-low ERA of 1.89, saved 17 games, and won 4.

Son continued to dominate in 2012 and 2013, when he recorded 33 and 46 saves, respectively. Despite sub-par seasons in 2014 and 2015, Son attained Free Agent status after the 2015 season, and signed a four-year, KRW 6 billion contract with the Lotte Giants. While he failed to live up to the expectations in 2016, with a 4.26 ERA and only 20 saves, he rebounded in 2017 to re-establish himself as the league's best closer. He led the Giants to the team's first playoff appearance in 5 years, finishing the season with 37 saves and a 2.18 ERA.

Son decided to retire after the 2019 season due to a conflict with Giants about salary negotiations. Son finished his career second on all the all-time saves list in the KBO with 271.

=== Notable international careers ===
Year	Venue	Competition	Team	Individual note
2009	Europe	World Cup	9th	1–1; 2.37 ERA (3 G, 19.0 IP, 5 ER, 12 K)
2013	United States	World Baseball Classic		

== See also ==
- List of KBO career saves leaders
