= Kim In-tae =

South Korean baseball player (born 1994)

Doosan Bears – No. 33
- Outfielder
- Born: July 3, 1994 (age 32); Daegu, South Korea
- Bats: Left Throws: Left

KBO debut
- 2016, for the Doosan Bears

KBO statistics (through 2024 season)
- Batting average: .243
- Home runs: 21
- Runs batted in: 124
- Stats at Baseball Reference

Teams
- Police Baseball Team (army) (2014–2015); Doosan Bears (2016–present)

Kim In-tae (Korean: 김인태; born July 3, 1994) is a South Korean professional baseball outfielder for the Doosan Bears of the KBO League. He graduated from Bugil High School and was selected for the Doosan Bears by a draft in 2013 (2nd draft, 1st round).
