= Lim Jung-ho =

South Korean baseball player (born 1990)

NC Dinos – No. 13
- Pitcher
- Born: April 16, 1990 (age 36); Seoul, South Korea
- Bats: Left Throws: Left

KBO debut
- March 28, 2015, for the NC Dinos

KBO statistics (through June 2, 2024)
- Win–loss record: 11–18
- Earned run average: 4.38
- Strikeouts: 279
- Holds: 88
- Saves: 2
- Stats at Baseball Reference

Teams
- NC Dinos (2015–present)

- Lim Jung-ho
- Hangul: 임정호
- Hanja: 林正鎬
- RR: Im Jeongho
- MR: Im Chŏngho

Lim Jung-ho (born April 16, 1990) is a South Korean professional baseball pitcher for the NC Dinos of the KBO League.
