= Gudeok Baseball Stadium =

1971–2017 stadium in Busan, South Korea

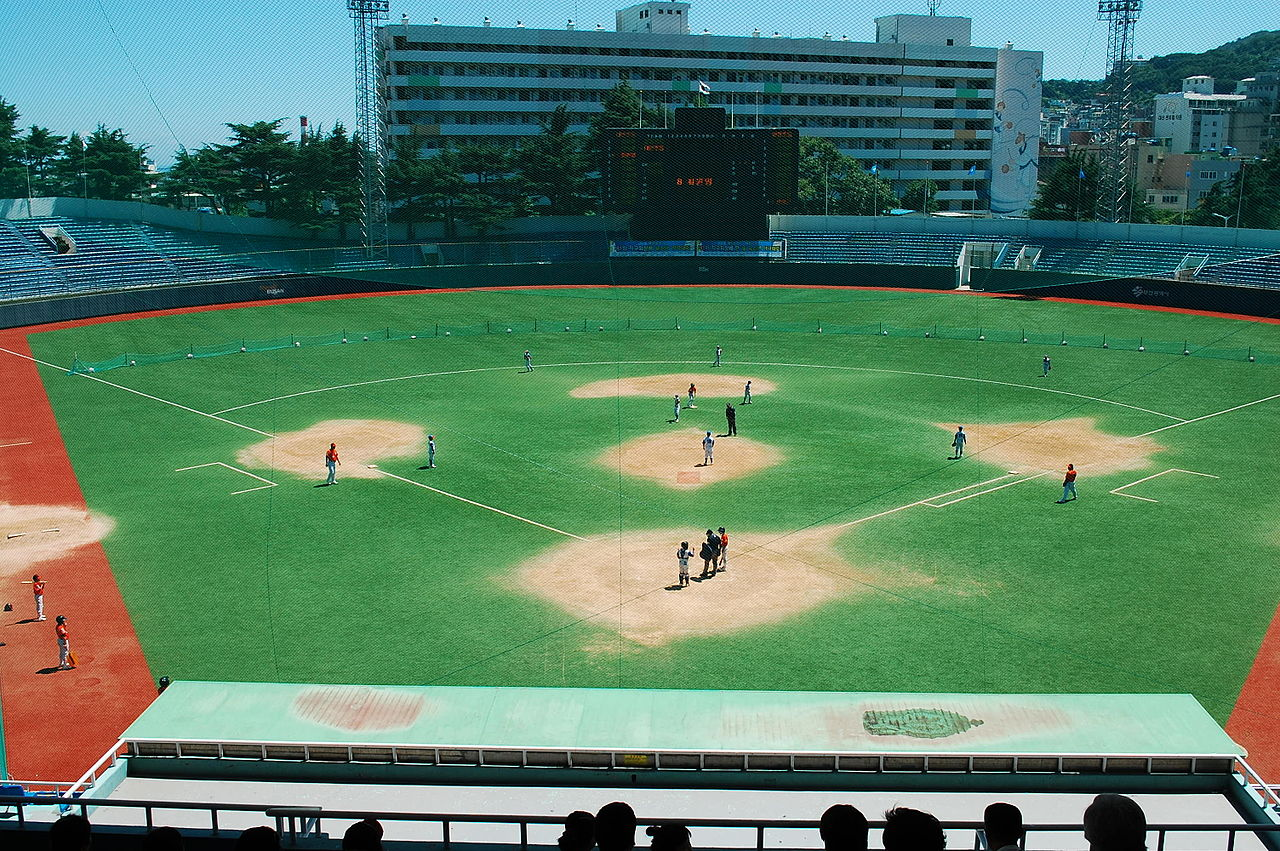
- Gudeok Baseball Stadium in Busan
- Interactive map of Gudeok Baseball Stadium
- Location: Seo Daeshin-dong, Seo-gu, Busan, South Korea
- Coordinates: 35.116230°N 129.016037°E
- Owner: City of Busan
- Capacity: 11,724
- Surface: Artificial turf
- Field size: Left Field – 88 metres (289 ft); Right Field – 88 metres (289 ft); Center – 110 metres (361 ft)

Construction
- Opened: March 1971
- Demolished: 19 September 2017

Tenant
- Lotte Giants (1982–1985)

- Gudeok Baseball Stadium
- Hangul: 구덕야구장
- Hanja: 九德野球場
- RR: Gudeok yagujang
- MR: Kudŏk yagujang

Gudeok Baseball Stadium (Korean: 구덕야구장) was a baseball stadium in Busan, South Korea. It was the former home stadium of the Lotte Giants. It held 11,724 people and was built in 1971. The stadium was demolished on 19 September 2017.
