= Park Kun-woo =

South Korean baseball player (born 1990)

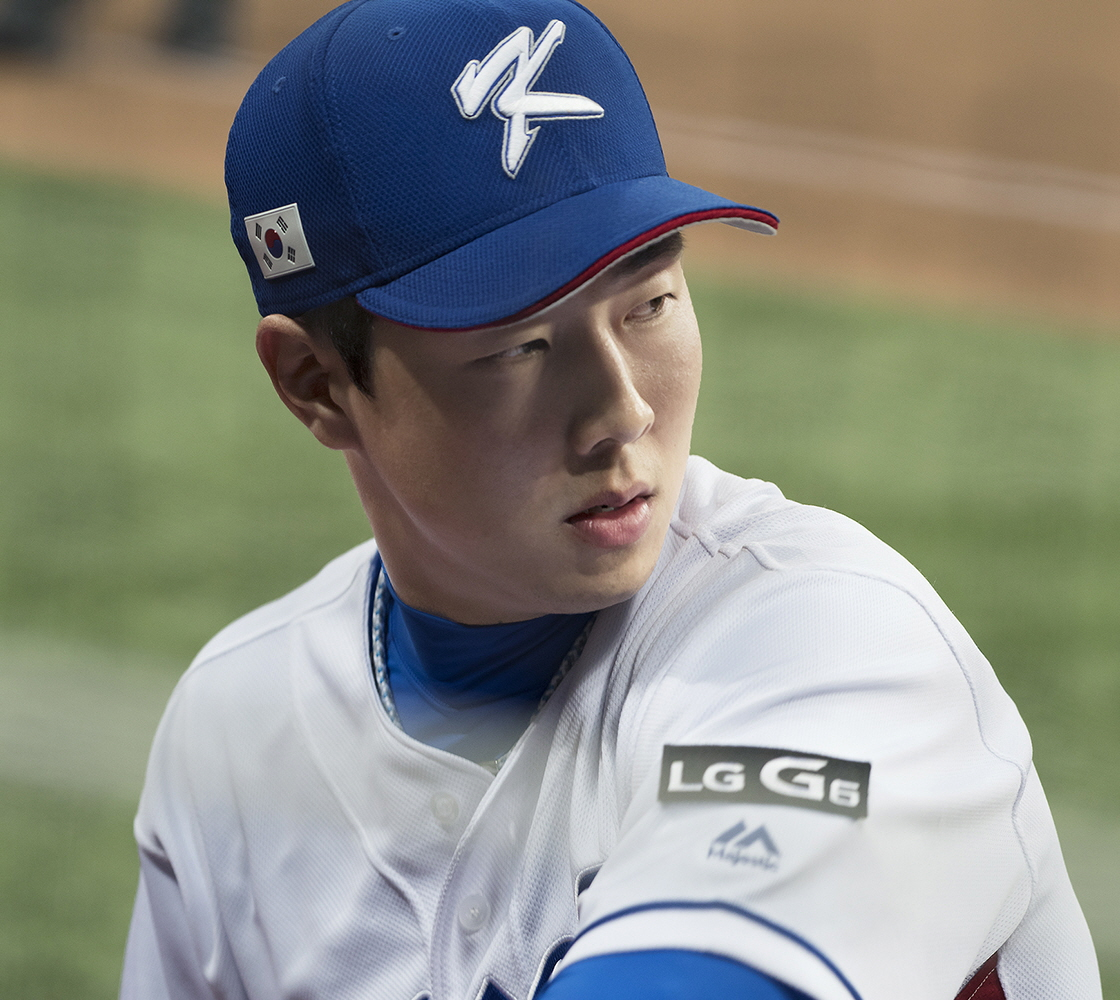

NC Dinos – No. 37
- Outfielder
- Born: September 8, 1990 (age 35)
- Bats: Right Throws: Right

KBO debut
- September 2, 2009, for the Doosan Bears

KBO statistics (through June 5, 2024)
- Batting average: .327
- Home runs: 115
- Runs batted in: 655
- Stats at Baseball Reference

Teams
- Doosan Bears (2009–2021); Police Baseball Team (army) (2011–2012); NC Dinos (2022–present)

Career highlights and awards
- KBO Golden Glove Award (2023)

Park Kun-woo (Korean: 박건우; born September 8, 1990) is a South Korean professional baseball outfielder for the NC Dinos of the KBO League. He joined the Doosan Bears through the second draft in 2009 after graduating from Seoul High School. On September 2, 2009, he made his first hit and scored his first run in his debut game. After the 2010 season, he temporarily left the Doosan Bears to serve a two-year mandatory military commitment. He played for the Korean Police Baseball Team during the military duty in 2011 and 2012. He played for the South Korea national baseball team at the 2017 World Baseball Classic.

In 2017, he joined the 20–20 club as the first player in the Bears history.
