= Kook Hae-seong =

South Korean baseball player

- Outfielder
- Born: October 8, 1989 (age 36); Gunsan, South Korea
- Batted: Switch Threw: Right

KBO debut
- June 23, 2012, for the Doosan Bears

Last KBO appearance
- September 29, 2023, for the Lotte Giants

KBO statistics
- Batting average: .238
- Home runs: 11
- Runs batted in: 67
- Stats at Baseball Reference

Teams
- Doosan Bears (2012–2021); Lotte Giants (2023); Police Baseball Team (army) (2009–2012)

Kook Hae-seong (Korean: 국해성; Hanja: 鞠海成; born 8 October 1989) is a South Korean professional baseball outfielder who played for the Doosan Bears of the KBO League. His major position is right fielder and left fielder, but he sometimes plays as center fielder or first baseman. He graduated from Incheon High School. Upon graduation from high school, he made himself eligible for the 2008 KBO First-Year Player Draft, but went undrafted. Instead, Kook signed a contract with the Chicago Cubs in 2007. However, after the problem of elbow was found and the contract was broken, he was signed by the Doosan Bears as an undrafted free agent.
