= Yang Sang-moon =

South Korean baseball player

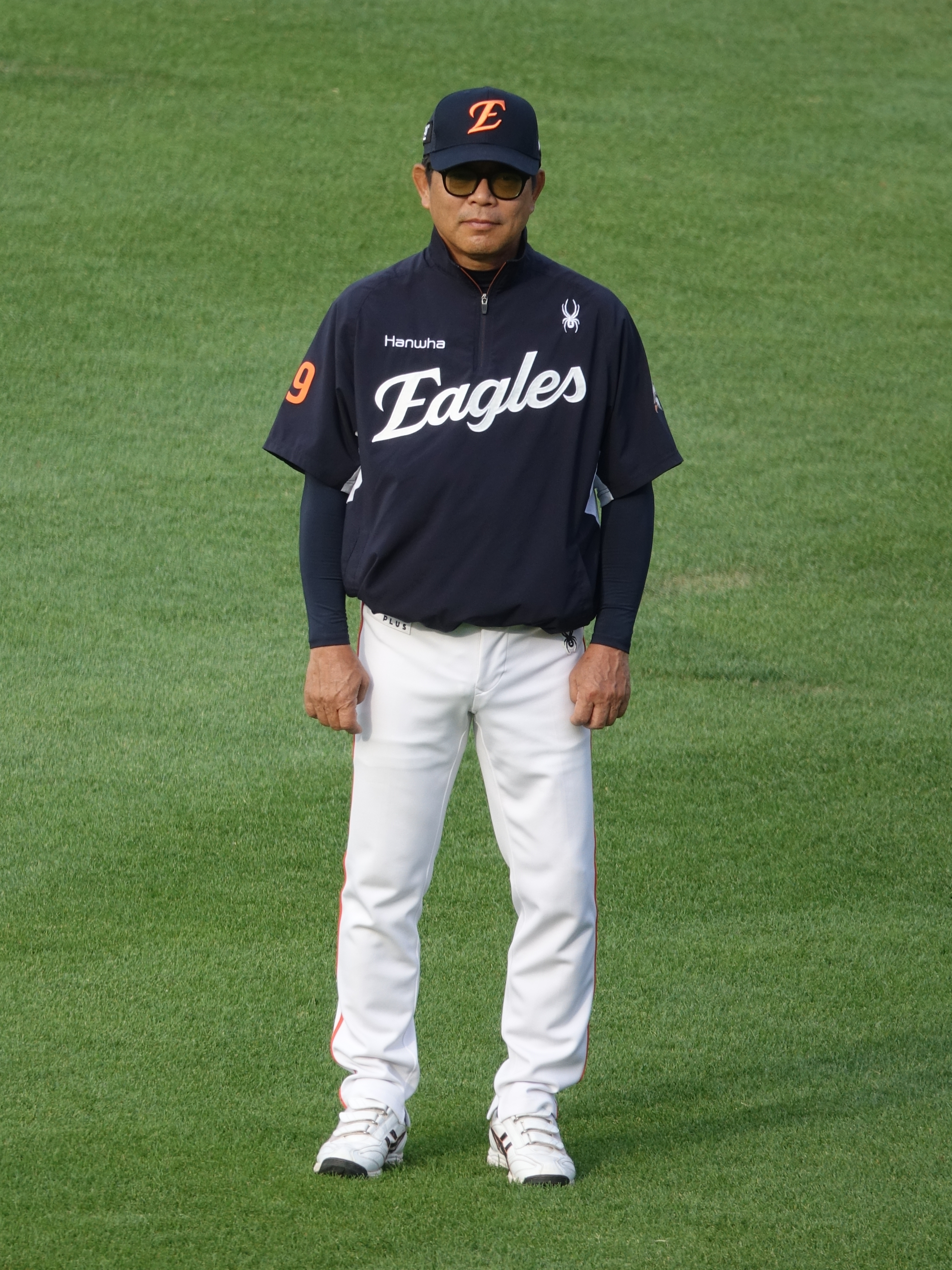

Hanwha Eagles – No. 79
- Pitching coach
- Born: March 24, 1961 (age 65); Pusan, South Korea
- Batted: Left Threw: Left

KBO debut
- 1985, for the Lotte Giants

Last appearance
- 1993, for the Pacific Dolphins

Teams
- As player: Lotte Giants (1985–1986); Chungbo Pintos / Pacific Dolphins (1987–1993); As coach: Lotte Giants (1994–1997, 1999–2001, 2010); LG Twins (2002–2003, 2007–2008); Hanhwa Eagles (2024–present); As manager: Lotte Giants (2004–2005, 2019); LG Twins (2014–2017)

- Yang Sang-moon
- Hangul: 양상문
- Hanja: 楊相汶
- RR: Yang Sangmun
- MR: Yang Sangmun

Yang Sang-moon (born March 24, 1961) is a retired South Korean professional baseball pitcher who played for the Lotte Giants and Pacific Dolphins.

== Playing career ==
Yang Sang-moon made his debut in the Korea Baseball Organization (KBO) with the Lotte Giants in 1985. In his rookie season, he recorded a 6–3 win–loss record, four saves, and a 3.83 earned run average (ERA) across 101 innings. The following year, he posted one of his best statistical performances, compiling a 1.93 ERA while allowing only 27 hits in 37.1 innings.

Preceded by Baek In-chun	Lotte Giants Manager; 2004–2005	Succeeded by Kang Byeong-cheol
Preceded by Kim Ki-tae	LG Twins Manager; 2014–2017	Succeeded by Ryu Joong-il
Preceded by Cho Won-woo	Lotte Giants Manager; 2019	Succeeded by Kong Pil-seong
