= Lee Won-seok (baseball) =

South Korean baseball player

- Third baseman
- Born: October 21, 1986 (age 40); Gwangju, South Korea
- Bats: Right Throws: Right

KBO debut
- April 2, 2005, for the Lotte Giants

KBO statistics (through 2024 season)
- Batting average: .261
- Home runs: 144
- Runs batted in: 791
- Stats at Baseball Reference

Teams
- Lotte Giants (2005–2008); Doosan Bears (2009–2014, 2016); Samsung Lions (2017–2023); Kiwoom Heroes (2023–2025)

- Lee Won-seok
- Hangul: 이원석
- Hanja: 李沅錫
- RR: I Wonseok
- MR: I Wŏnsŏk

Lee Won-suk (born October 21, 1986) is a South Korean professional baseball infielder currently playing for the Kiwoom Heroes of Korean Professional Baseball League.

He qualified for the FA after the 2016 season. On November 21, 2016, he signed an FA contract for 2.7 billion won, including 1.5 billion won in four-year down payment and 300 million won in annual salary.
