= Kim Tae-gun =

South Korean baseball player (born 1989)

Kia Tigers – No. 42
- Catcher
- Born: December 30, 1989 (age 36)
- Bats: Right Throws: Right

KBO debut
- June 29, 2008, for the LG Twins

KBO statistics (through 2025)
- Batting average: .250
- Home runs: 37
- Runs batted in: 368
- Stats at Baseball Reference

Teams
- LG Twins (2008–2012); NC Dinos (2013–2017); Korean Police Baseball Team (2018–2019); NC Dinos (2019–2021); Samsung Lions (2022–2023); Kia Tigers (2023–present)

Career highlights and awards
- Korean Series champion (2024)

- Kim Tae-gun
- Hangul: 김태군
- Hanja: 金泰君
- RR: Gim Taegun
- MR: Kim T'aegun

Kim Tae-gun (Korean: 김태군; born December 30, 1989) is a South Korean catcher for the Kia Tigers in the KBO League.

== Professional career ==
Kim was selected by the LG Twins in the third round of the 2007 KBO Draft out of Busan High School. He was traded to the NC Dinos after the 2012 season. Kim fulfilled his military duties by playing with the Korean Police Baseball Team in 2018–2019. He rejoined the Dinos at the tail-end of the 2019 season.

And he traded to Samsung Lions after 2021 season, and traded to KIA Tigers in 2023.
