= Min Byung-hun =

South Korean baseball player

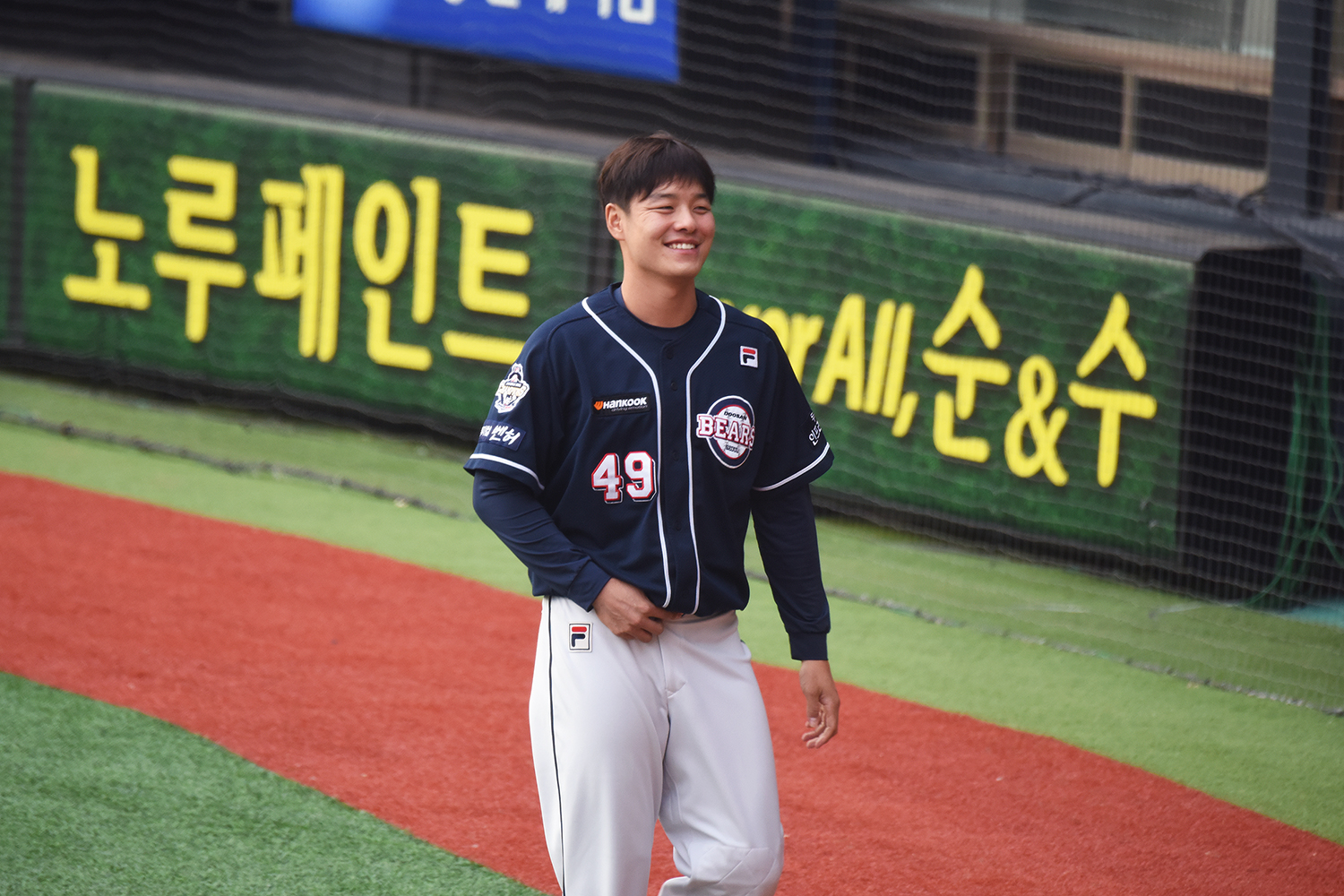

Lotte Giants – No. 3
- Right fielder
- Born: March 10, 1987 (age 39); Seoul
- Bats: Right Throws: Right

KBO debut
- 2006, for the Doosan Bears

KBO statistics (through August 1, 2019)
- Batting average: .301
- Home runs: 93
- RBI: 536
- Stats at Baseball Reference

Teams
- Doosan Bears (2006–2017); Police Baseball Team (2011–2012); Lotte Giants (2018–present)
Medals
Men's baseball
Representing South Korea
2015 WBSC Premier12
| Gold medal – first place | 2015 Tokyo | Team |

- Min Byung-hun
- Hangul: 민병헌
- Hanja: 閔炳憲
- RR: Min Byeongheon
- MR: Min Pyŏnghŏn

Min Byung-hun (born March 10, 1987) is a South Korean former professional baseball right fielder who last played for the Lotte Giants of the Korea Baseball Organization in 2021. He signed with the team in November 2017 after spending eleven seasons with the Doosan Bears. As a result of Min signing with the Giants in free agency, the Bears received Baek Dong-hoon from the Giants as a compensation player.
