= Jeon Jun-woo =

South Korean baseball player (born 1986)

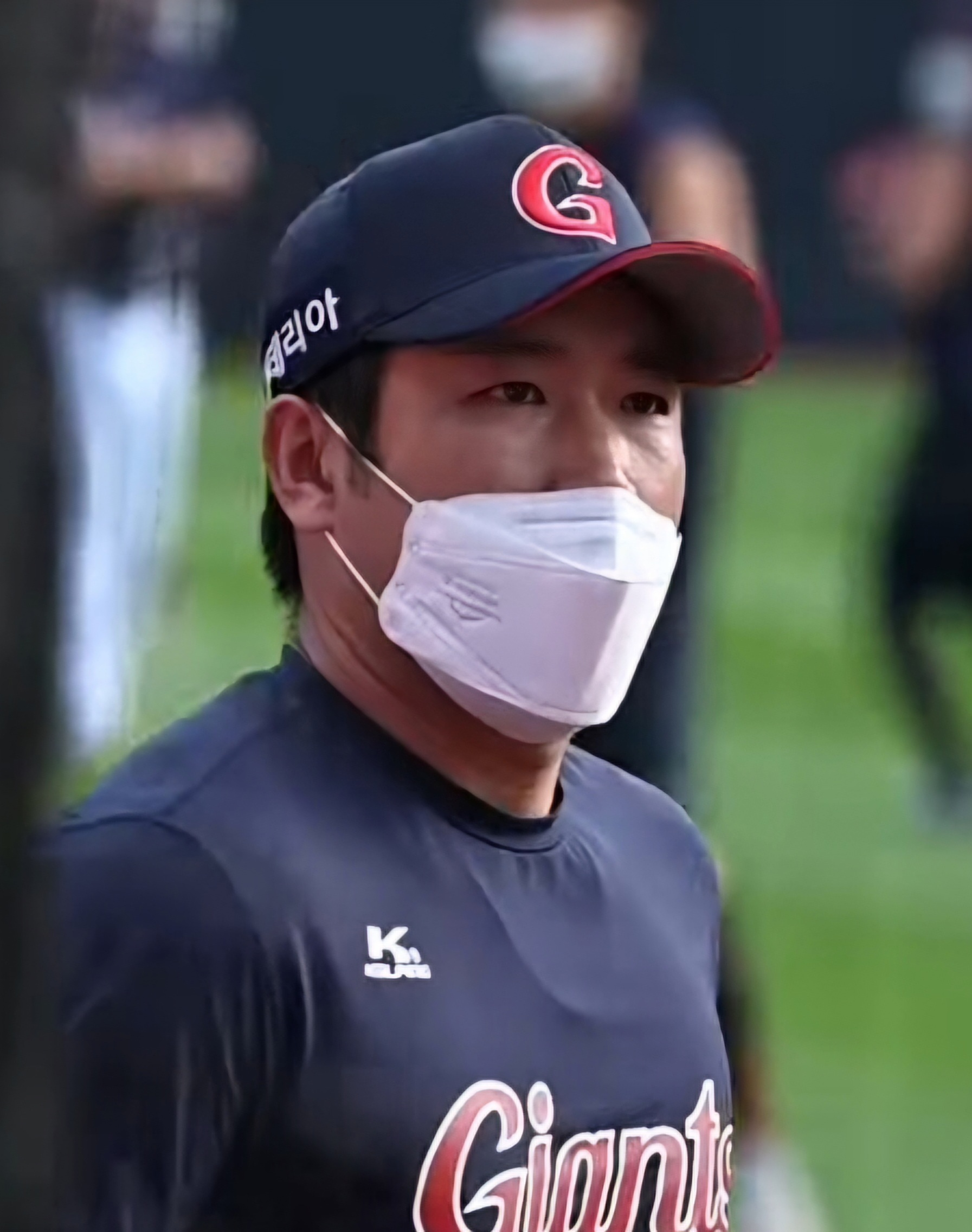

Lotte Giants – No. 8
- Outfielder
- Born: February 25, 1986 (age 40); Gyeongju, South Korea
- Bats: Right Throws: Right

KBO statistics (through September 29, 2025)
- Batting average: .300
- Home runs: 221
- Runs batted in: 1040
- Stats at Baseball Reference

Teams
- Lotte Giants (2008–present); Police Baseball Team (2015–2016) (army service)

Jeon Jun-woo (born February 25, 1986) is a South Korean professional baseball player for the Lotte Giants of the Korea Baseball Organization. He represented the South Korea national baseball team at the 2013 World Baseball Classic.

He qualified for FA after the 2019 season. Jeon signed a four-year, 3.4 billion won FA contract with the Lotte Giants.

== Theme song ==
- Starstrukk - 30H!3
