= Ryu Ji-hyuk =

South Korean baseball player (born 1994)

Samsung Lions – No. 16
- Infielder
- Born: 13 January 1994 (age 32); Seoul, South Korea
- Bats: Left Throws: Right

KBO debut
- June 21, 2012, for the Doosan Bears

KBO statistics (through June 6, 2024)
- Batting average: .271
- Home runs: 15
- Runs batted in: 252
- Stats at Baseball Reference

Teams
- Doosan Bears (2012–2020); Sangmu Phoenix (baseball) (2013–2014); Kia Tigers (2020–2023); Samsung Lions (2023–present)

Career highlights and awards
- Korean Series champion (2016, 2019, 2026)

Ryu Ji-hyuk (born 13 January 1994) is a South Korean professional baseball infielder for the Samsung Lions of the KBO League. His major position is shortstop, however, he sometimes plays as second base man and third base man. He graduated from Choongam High School and was selected for the Doosan Bears by a draft in 2012 (2nd draft, 4th round). His back number is No. 8.

On June 7, 2020, Hong Gun-hee of the Kia Tigers moved to the Kia Tigers in a one-on-one trade.
