= Cho Young-hun =

South Korean baseball player (born 1982)

- First baseman
- Born: November 12, 1982 (age 43)
- Batted: Left Threw: Left

KBO debut
- 2005, for the Samsung Lions

Last appearance
- 2017, for the NC Dinos

KBO statistics (through 2017)
- Batting average: .257
- Home runs: 47
- Runs batted in: 258
- Stats at Baseball Reference

Teams
- Samsung Lions (2005–2007; 2010–2011); Korean Police Baseball Team (2008–2009); Kia Tigers (2012); NC Dinos (2013–2017)
Medals
Men's baseball
Representing South Korea
Baseball World Cup
Silver medal – second place	2005 Netherlands	Team

Cho Young-Hun or Jo Young-Hoon (Korean: 조영훈; Hanja: 趙煐勳; born November 12, 1982) is a South Korean former first baseman, who played 11 seasons in the KBO League with the Samsung Lions, Kia Tigers, and NC Dinos. He bats and throws left-handed.

== Amateur career ==
While attending Sokcho Commerce High School in Gangwon Province, Cho was considered one of the top high school hitting pitchers nationwide along with Choo Shin-soo and Lee Dae-ho. As the team's ace and cleanup hitter Cho led Sokcho Commerce High School, considered underdogs, to the quarterfinals at the Blue Dragon Flag National Championship and the President's Cup National Championship in 2000. In the same year Cho was selected for the South Korean Junior National Team. The team won the 2000 World Junior Baseball Championship in Edmonton, Alberta, Canada, and Cho led the attack alongside Lee Dae-ho, Choo Shin-soo, Kim Tae-kyun and Jeong Keun-woo.

Upon leaving high school, Cho was selected 19th overall by the Samsung Lions at the 2001 KBO Draft, but decided to play college baseball at Konkuk University. In his junior year at Konkuk University in 2003, Cho helped his team to win the Fall League of the National Collegiate Championship earning MVP honors with the batting title.

=== Notable international careers ===
Year	Venue	Competition	Team
2000	Canada	World Junior Baseball Championship	Gold medal
2002	Italy	World University Baseball Championship	5th
2004	Chinese Taipei	World University Baseball Championship	Bronze medal

== Professional career ==
=== Samsung Lions ===
Cho was signed by the Samsung Lions in 2005. In his rookie season, he only appeared in seven games, having one hit in four at-bats. In 2006 Cho finished his sophomore season with a respectable .283 batting average, two home runs, 26 RBI and nine stolen bases in 88 games.

In 2007 Cho fell into a horrendous slump, batting only .168 in 66 games. After the season, he left the Lions to serve military service and played baseball in the Police Baseball Team as military duty. While playing in the Police team for two years, Cho was a fixture at first base and sporadically appeared in games as a relief pitcher.

In 2010 Cho came back to the Lions after being discharged from two-year military service. Cho's batting average rose to a respectable .275 in the 2010 season, but dipped to .245 in 2011.

=== Kia Tigers ===
After the 2011 season he was traded to the Kia Tigers. However, Cho had his worst KBO season in 2012 when he batted .200 and committed a career-worst ten errors as a first baseman in 89 games.

=== NC Dinos ===
The 2013 KBO Expansion Draft for the newly founded NC Dinos was held after the 2012 season. Cho was picked up in the expansion draft by the Dinos and became a fixture at first base.

=== Notable international careers ===
Year	Venue	Competition	Team	Individual note
2005	Netherlands	Baseball World Cup	Silver medal	.214 BA (6-for-28), 1 HR, 4 RBI, 4 R, 3 BB
2009	Europe	Baseball World Cup	9th	.214 BA (6-for-28), 1 HR, 4 RBI, 4 R, 7 BB, 2 SB
