= Jang Hyun-sik =

South Korean baseball player (born 1995)

LG Twins – No. 50
- Pitcher
- Born: February 24, 1995 (age 31); Bucheon, Gyeonggi, South Korea
- Bats: Right Throws: Right

KBO debut
- September 22, 2013, for the NC Dinos

KBO statistics (through 2025)
- Win–loss record: 35–39
- Earned run average: 4.87
- Strikeouts: 558
- Stats at Baseball Reference

Teams
- NC Dinos (2013, 2015–2020); Kia Tigers (2020–2024); LG Twins (2025–present)

- Jang Hyun-sik
- Hangul: 장현식
- Hanja: 張現植
- RR: Jang Hyeonsik
- MR: Chang Hyŏnsik

Jang Hyun-sik (born February 24, 1995) is a South Korean professional baseball pitcher currently playing for the LG Twins of the KBO League.

He was a promising player called the volleyball court trio when he was in the NC Dinos, but moved to the KIA Tigers through a trade in 2020. With the confidence of manager Matt Williams, he was awakened while continuing to receive opportunities in the first division, recording 34 holds in the 2021 season, becoming the first Tigers franchise to win the Hold King title.

He is a pitcher with a fastball of up to 153 km/h and an average of 145 km/h and a sharp-angle bell slider. In particular, the slider is fun to use as a backdoor slider against the left-handed batter. In addition, it uses curves, changeups, and splitters, although its completeness is low.

On a scratchy day, he has a pitch that can overwhelm the batter enough to strike out with only three fastballs in the middle, but he still lacks stability due to lack of experience and has jagged control. He makes good use of every corner of the zone when he is in good condition, but in bad times, he often shows unpredictable control and pitches that are completely out of the zone. In particular, in the 2016 season, the first full-time season, he made 13 wild pitches in 76⅓ innings and tied for first place with Ryu Je-guk, who played 161⅓ innings. However, as he entered the second half of the season, he showed improvement and showed potential for development.

Until the beginning of the 2017 season, he had a hard time dragging long innings as his ball control was worse than in the 2016 season, but since June, he has greatly improved his ball control by adding a move to flip the glove behind his head when winding up on the existing pitching form. BB/9 reached 10.3 until May, but it was lowered to 2-3 after correcting the pitching form.
