= Kim Kang-ryul =

South Korean baseball player

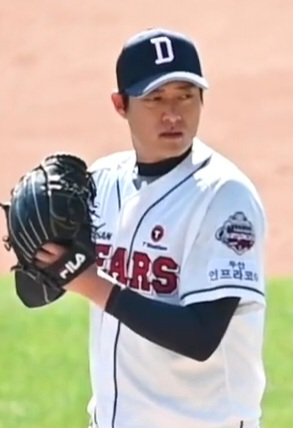

LG Twins – No. 37
- Pitcher
- Born: 28 August 1988 (age 38); Goyang, South Korea
- Bats: Right Throws: Right

KBO debut
- September 5, 2008, for the Doosan Bears

KBO statistics (through 2024 season)
- Win–loss record: 26–14
- Earned run average: 3.81
- Strikeouts: 398
- Stats at Baseball Reference

Teams
- Doosan Bears (2008); Korean Police Baseball Team (2009–2010); Doosan Bears (2011–2018, 2020–2024); LG Twins (2025–present)

Kim Kang-ryul (Korean: 김강률; Hanja: 金江栗; born August 28, 1988) is a South Korean professional baseball pitcher who is currently playing for the LG Twins of the KBO League. He graduated from Kyunggi High School (경기고등학교; 京畿高等學校) and was selected to Doosan Bears by a draft in 2007. (2nd draft, 4th round)
