= Won Jong-hyun =

South Korean baseball player

NC Dinos – No. 46
- Pitcher
- Born: July 31, 1987 (age 39); Gunsan, North Jeolla
- Bats: Right Throws: Right

KBO debut
- April 3, 2014, for the NC Dinos

KBO statistics (through August 1, 2019)
- Win–loss: 17–19
- Earned run average: 4.04
- Strikeouts: 293
- Holds: 67
- Saves: 30
- Stats at Baseball Reference

Teams
- NC Dinos (2014); Korean Police Baseball Team (2015); NC Dinos (2016–present)

- Won Jong-hyun
- Hangul: 원종현
- Hanja: 元鐘玄
- RR: Won Jonghyeon
- MR: Wŏn Chonghyŏn

Won Jong-hyun (born July 31, 1987) is a South Korean professional baseball pitcher currently playing for the NC Dinos of the KBO League.
