= Mo Chang-min =

South Korean baseball player (born 1985)

LG Twins
- Infielder
- Born: May 8, 1985 (age 41); Gwangju, South Korea
- Bats: Right Throws: Right

KBO debut
- March 30, 2008, for the SK Wyverns

KBO statistics (through August 1, 2019)
- Batting average: .282
- Home runs: 88
- Runs batted in: 405
- Stats at Baseball Reference

Teams
- SK Wyverns (2008–2012); NC Dinos (2013–2021)

Mo Chang-min (Korean: 모창민; Hanja: 牟唱民; born May 8, 1985 in Gwangju) is a retired professional baseball player who played in the KBO League for the NC Dinos. He bats and throws right-handed mostly played as an infielder.

== Amateur career ==
After graduating from Gwangju Jaeil High School, Mo went undrafted in the 2005 KBO Amateur Draft. Instead, he entered Sungkyunkwan University to play college baseball. While in college, Mo was regarded as the best collegiate five-tool player, winning numerous home run and stolen base titles. In July 2006, as a junior at Sungkyunkwan University, Mo got his first call-up to the South Korea national baseball team and competed in the team's three friendly baseball matches against the USA national baseball team in Durham, North Carolina, as a cleanup hitter. He hit a two-RBI single off future Cy Young Award winner Jake Arrieta in Game 3 but struggled at the plate during the series, going 1-for-10.

=== Notable international careers ===
Year	Venue	Competition	Team	Individual note
2006	United States	South Korea vs USA Baseball Championship	1W-2L	.100 BA (1-for-10), 2 RBI

== Professional career ==
Mo was selected by the SK Wyverns with the 10th overall pick of the 2008 KBO Draft. After the Draft, Wyverns manager Kim Sung-Keun indicated an expectation that Mo would resume his role as the team's top base-stealing slugger entering the 2008 season. The team gave Mo consistent chances during the season when he appeared in 91 games. However, Mo finished his rookie season with a disappointing .223 batting average, 1 home run, 20 RBI and 10 stolen bases.

In 2009 Mo posted slightly better offensive stats, batting .237 and smacking 4 home runs in 92 games. In 2010, however, Mo was demoted to the Wyverns' second-tier team, spending half of the 2010 season in the Futures League. He hit only .183 with 2 RBI through the 2010 season.

After the 2010 season, Mo left the Wyverns to serve a two-year mandatory military commitment. In October 2011, Mo competed for the South Korean national team in the 2011 Baseball World Cup where he batted .302 and smacked 2 home runs with 6 RBI, appearing in all 12 games as a starting third baseman. He made the tourney All-Star team at third base, beating out Michel Enríquez and Javier Castillo.

Mo was drafted by the NC Dinos in the 2013 KBO Expansion Draft. In his first year with the Dinos, he batted .276 with 12 home runs and 51 RBIs. In the 2014 season, Mo batted .263, with career highs in home runs (16), RBI (72) and hits (110).

Prior to the 2016 season, Mo sustained a knee injury. In early March, he underwent arthroscopic surgery to repair a torn meniscus, and missed the first half of the season. He returned from injury in July, and finished the season with a .319 batting average in 133 at-bats.

Mo bounced back in the 2017 season, establishing career-highs in numerous offensive categories, including hits (148), doubles (25), home runs (17), RBIs (90), total bases (230), and walks (39).

== Notable international careers ==
Year	Venue	Competition	Team	Individual Note
2011	Panama	Baseball World Cup	6th	.302 BA (13-for-43), 6 RBI, 2 HR, 5 R All-Star (3B)
