= Byeon Jin-su =

South Korean baseball player

Byun Jin-soo
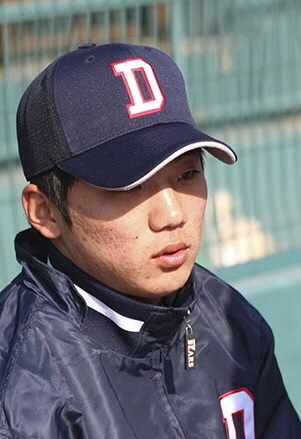

Kia Tigers
- Pitcher
- Born: 1 April 1993 (age 33); Changwon, South Gyeongsang Province
- Bats: Right Throws: Right

KBO League debut
- June 13, 2012, for the Doosan Bears

KBO statistics (through 2018 season)
- Win–loss record: 7–1
- Earned run average: 4.58
- Strikeouts: 76
- Stats at Baseball Reference

Teams
- Doosan Bears (2012–2019); Korean Police Baseball Team (2016–2017)

Byun Jin-soo (변진수; born 1 April 1993) is a South Korean professional baseball pitcher who is currently playing for the Kia Tigers of KBO League. He graduated from Choongam High School (leading the school to victory in the 2011 Hwanggeumsajagi National High School Baseball Championship) and was selected for the Doosan Bears by a draft in 2012 (2nd draft, 2nd round). He pitches underhand, and his fast fastball (around 140 km/h) and high-falling slider are his main weapons. His sinker and changeup are said to be his main weaknesses.

== Career records ==
Year	Team	ERA	G	CG	SHO	W	L	SV	HLD	WPCT	PA	IP	H	HR	BB	HBP	K	R	ER
2012	Doosan Bears	1.71	31	0	0	4	0	1	2	1.000	118	31.2	15	0	11	3	18	6	6
2013	Doosan Bears	4.70	38	0	0	2	1	0	6	0.667	170	38.1	37	2	19	8	20	21	20
2014	Doosan Bears	5.08	31	0	0	0	0	0	3	-	141	33.2	35	3	10	4	29	21	19
2015	Doosan Bears	10.80	1	0	0	1	0	0	0	1.000	9	1.2	1	0	3	1	1	2	2
2018	Doosan Bears	10.13	10	0	0	0	0	0	0	-	52	32	16	2	2	4	8	12	12
