= Hong Sang-sam =

South Korean baseball player (born 1990)

- Pitcher
- Born: 13 February 1990 (age 36); Guro-gu
- Bats: Left Throws: Right

KBO debut
- May 2, 2009, for the Doosan Bears

KBO statistics (through June 21, 2019)
- Win–loss record: 25–21
- Earned run average: 4.84
- Strikeouts: 392
- Stats at Baseball Reference

Teams
- Doosan Bears (2008–2019); Korean Police Baseball Team (2015–2016); Kia Tigers (2020–2022)

- Hong Sang-sam
- Hangul: 홍상삼
- Hanja: 洪相三
- RR: Hong Sangsam
- MR: Hong Sangsam

Hong Sang-sam (Korean: 홍상삼; born 13 February 1990) is a South Korean professional baseball pitcher for the Doosan Bears of the KBO League. He graduated from Choongam High School and was selected to Doosan Bears by a draft in 2008 (2nd draft, 3rd round).
