= Choi Keum-kang =

South Korean baseball player

NC Dinos – No. 66
- Pitcher
- Born: April 26, 1989 (age 36); Incheon
- Bats: Right Throws: Right

KBO debut
- April 2, 2013, for the NC Dinos

KBO statistics (through 2018 season)
- Win–loss record: 22–15
- Earned run average: 5.60
- Strikeouts: 251
- Holds: 23
- Saves: 3
- Stats at Baseball Reference

Teams
- NC Dinos (2013–present)

- Choi Keum-kang
- Hangul: 최금강
- Hanja: 崔今康
- RR: Choe Geumgang
- MR: Ch'oe Kŭmgang

Choi Keum-kang (born April 26, 1989) is a South Korean professional baseball pitcher for the NC Dinos of the KBO League.
