= Kim Jong-ho (baseball) =

South Korean baseball player (born 1984)

- Right fielder
- Born: May 31, 1984 (age 41); Seoul, South Korea
- Batted: Left Threw: Left

KBO debut
- August 27, 2011, for the Samsung Lions

Last KBO appearance
- 2017, for the NC Dinos

KBO statistics
- Batting average: .280
- Home runs: 6
- Runs batted in: 90
- Stolen bases: 128
- Stats at Baseball Reference

Teams
- Samsung Lions (2007–2012); NC Dinos (2013–2017)

- Kim Jong-ho
- Hangul: 김종호
- Hanja: 金宗鎬
- RR: Gim Jongho
- MR: Kim Chongho

Kim Jong-ho (Korean: 김종호; born May 31, 1984) is a South Korean former professional baseball outfielder He played in the KBO League for the Samsung Lions and NC Dinos from 2007 to 2017. He bats and throws left-handed.

== Amateur career ==
After graduating from Paichai High School in Seoul, Kim went undrafted in the 2003 KBO Amateur Draft. Instead, he entered Konkuk University to play college baseball. As a freshman in 2003, Kim became a member of the team to win the Fall League of the National Collegiate Championship as the leadoff hitter. In his sophomore and junior years at Konkuk University Kim led his team to two consecutive runner-up finishes at the National Amateur Championship alongside future KBO star Jeon Jun-woo, winning the batting title in 2004 and the RBI title in 2005.

As a senior in 2006, Kim got his first call-up to the South Korea national baseball team and competed in the team's three friendly baseball matches against the USA national baseball team in Durham, North Carolina. He went 1-for-5 during the series, hitting a single off future MLB relief pitcher Daniel Moskos in Game 3.

=== Notable international careers ===
Year	Venue	Competition	Team	Individual note
2006	United States	South Korea vs USA Baseball Championship	1W-2L	.200 BA (1-for-5)

== Professional career ==
=== Samsung Lions ===
Kim was selected by the Samsung Lions with the 39th overall pick of the 2007 KBO Draft. However, Kim spent his whole rookie season in the Lions' second team playing in the Futures League. After the 2007 season, Kim left the Lions to serve a two-year mandatory military commitment.

Kim came back to the Lions in 2010. Although Kim was ranked first in RBI, doubles and triples, and fourth in batting average and stealing bases in the 2010 Futures League, winning the Futures League All-Star Game MVP, he was never promoted to the first team during the entire 2010 season.

Kim was eventually called up to the Lions' first team for the first time on August 26, 2011. He made his KBO league debut on August 27, inserted as a pinch runner against the Doosan Bears. After being hitless in one at-bat in another game, Kim was demoted to the second team again.

Kim played in 22 games for the Lions' first team in the 2012 KBO league. He was primarily used as a pinch runner, but also played as a substitute right fielder. Kim finished the season with a .250 batting average, having 12 at-bats and one stolen base.

=== NC Dinos ===
The 2013 KBO Expansion Draft for the newly founded NC Dinos was held after the 2012 season. Kim was picked up in the expansion draft by the Dinos and became the Dinos' inaugural leadoff hitter.
