= Koo Chang-mo =

South Korean baseball player (born 1997)

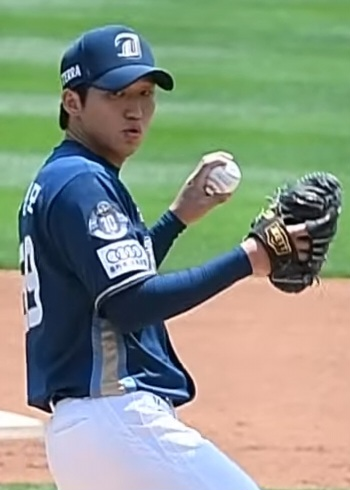

NC Dinos – No. 59
- Pitcher
- Born: February 17, 1997 (age 29); Bucheon, Gyeonggi Province, South Korea
- Bats: Left Throws: Left

KBO debut
- April 2, 2016, for the NC Dinos

KBO statistics (through July 8, 2024)
- Win–loss record: 47–37
- Earned run average: 3.68
- Strikeouts: 681
- Stats at Baseball Reference

Teams
- NC Dinos (2015–present); Sangmu Phoenix (2024–2025)

Career highlights and awards
- 2020 Korean Series

Koo Chang-mo (Korean: 구창모; born February 17, 1997) is a South Korean professional baseball pitcher for the NC Dinos of the KBO League. He was the KBO League MVP in May 2020.
