= Cho Won-woo =

South Korean baseball player

Lotte Giants – No. 74
- Outfielder / Manager / Coach
- Born: April 8, 1971 (age 55); Busan
- Batted: Right Threw: Right

KBO debut
- 1994, for the Ssangbangwool Raiders

Last appearance
- April 11, 2008, for the Hanwha Eagles

KBO statistics
- Batting average: .282
- Hits: 1,190
- Home runs: 68
- RBI: 443
- Stats at Baseball Reference

Teams
- As player: Ssangbangwool Raiders (1994–1999); SK Wyverns (2000–2005); Hanwha Eagles (2005–2008); As coach: Hanwha Eagles 2nd Team (2008–2009); Chiba Lotte Marines (2010); Lotte Giants (2011–2012, 2025, 2027–present); Doosan Bears (2013); SK Wyverns (2014–2015); Los Angeles Dodgers (2019); SSG Landers (2021–2024); Lotte Giants 2nd Team (2026); As manager: Lotte Giants (2016–2018); SSG Landers 2nd Team (2021)

- Cho Won-woo
- Hangul: 조원우
- Hanja: 趙原佑
- RR: Jo Wonu
- MR: Cho Wŏnu

Cho Won-woo (born April 8, 1971) is the former professional baseball manager of the Lotte Giants of the KBO League.

Preceded by Lee Jong-woon	Lotte Giants manager 2016–2018	Succeeded by Yang Sang-moon
