= Lee Ho-joon (baseball) =

South Korean baseball player (born 1976)

Lee Ho-Joon

NC Dinos
- Designated hitter / First baseman
- Born: February 8, 1976 (age 50)
- Batted: Right Threw: Right

KBO debut
- 1994, for the Haitai Tigers

Last KBO appearance
- 2017, for the NC Dinos

KBO statistics (through 2017 season)
- Batting average: .282
- Home runs: 337
- RBI: 1265
- Stats at Baseball Reference

Teams
- As player: Haitai Tigers (1994–2000); SK Wyverns (2000–2012); NC Dinos (2013–2017); As coach: Yomiuri Giants 2nd Team (2018); NC Dinos (2019–2021); LG Twins (2022–2024); As manager: NC Dinos (2025–present)

Career highlights and awards
- As player: 3x Korean Series champion (1997, 2007, 2010); As coach: 2x Korean Series champion (2020, 2023); 40 Legend All-Stars (2022)

- Lee Ho-joon
- Hangul: 이호준
- Hanja: 李昊俊
- RR: I Hojun
- MR: I Hojun

Lee Ho-Joon (born February 8, 1976, in Gwangju, South Korea) is a former South Korean professional baseball designated hitter and first baseman in the Korea Baseball Organization. He bats and throws right-handed. Lee ranks fourth all-time in the KBO League in both home runs and runs batted in.

== Amateur career ==
While attending Gwangju Jaeil High School, Lee was considered one of the top high school hitting pitchers, batting fourth in the team's batting order and pitching No.1 in the starting rotation. In November 1993 Lee was selected as a member of the South Korea junior national baseball team along with Cho In-Sung and competed in the friendly baseball series against the Japanese regional high school all-star teams. Lee helped Team Korea sweep the six-game series as a starting pitcher and first baseman.

== Professional career ==
=== Haitai Tigers / Kia Tigers ===
Lee made his KBO debut as a pitcher with the Haitai Tigers in 1994. He made eight appearances as a relief pitcher for the Tigers, posting a 10.22 earned run average and allowing seven home runs in 12 1/3 inning pitched. After his horrendous rookie season, Lee converted his position to first base.

In 1996, his first season as a position player, Lee batted .167 having three hits in 18 at-bats. He had a respectable season as a position player in the 1997, batting .278 in 58 games.

The next year (1998) was Lee's break-out season. He hit .303, the first .300 season of his career, and smacked 19 home runs with 77 RBI, becoming a fixture at first base and batting fourth in batting order for the Tigers.

Lee had another solid season in 1999, but his statistics declined from the previous year. He finished with a .276 batting average, 16 home runs and 55 RBI playing in 107 games as a first baseman.

=== SK Wyverns ===
During the 2000 season, Lee was traded to the SK Wyverns.

His breakout season in the SK Wyverns happened in 2003, when he slugged a career-high 36 home runs (fourth in the league), batted in 102 runs (fifth) and hit .290 for the Wyverns.

In 2004, Lee batted .280 with 30 home runs (third) and 87 runs (eighth); he led the league in RBI with a career-high 112.

Lee won his second Korean Series in 2007 as the Wyverns defeated the Doosan Bears in six games.

Lee won his third Korean Series in 2010 as the Wyverns swept four-game series against the Samsung Lions.

Lee set a KBO record on May 20, 2012 when he was walked in six consecutive plate appearances (a record tied by Kim Tae-kyun in 2013). He accomplished the feat in one game. In 127 games, Lee batted .300 with 78 RBI (seventh), 18 home runs (seventh) and a career-high 72 walks (third).

=== NC Dinos ===
The 2013 KBO Expansion Draft for the newly founded NC Dinos was held after the 2012 season. Lee was picked up in the expansion draft by the Dinos and became the Dinos' everyday designated hitter. In 2013, he was selected as a captain of NC Dinos. In 126 games, Lee batted .278 with 87 RBI (seventh), 20 home runs (seventh) and 60 walks. He had a remarkable season at age 39 in 2015, when he hit .294 with 24 home runs and 110 RBI. He hit 21 home runs in 2016, his fourth consecutive year with at least 20 home runs, and accomplishing the feat at age 40.

Lee retired from professional baseball at the end of the 2017 season. He became the manager of the NC Dinos following the 2024 season.

== See also ==
- List of KBO career home run leaders
- List of KBO career RBI leaders
