= Lim Chang-min =

South Korean baseball player

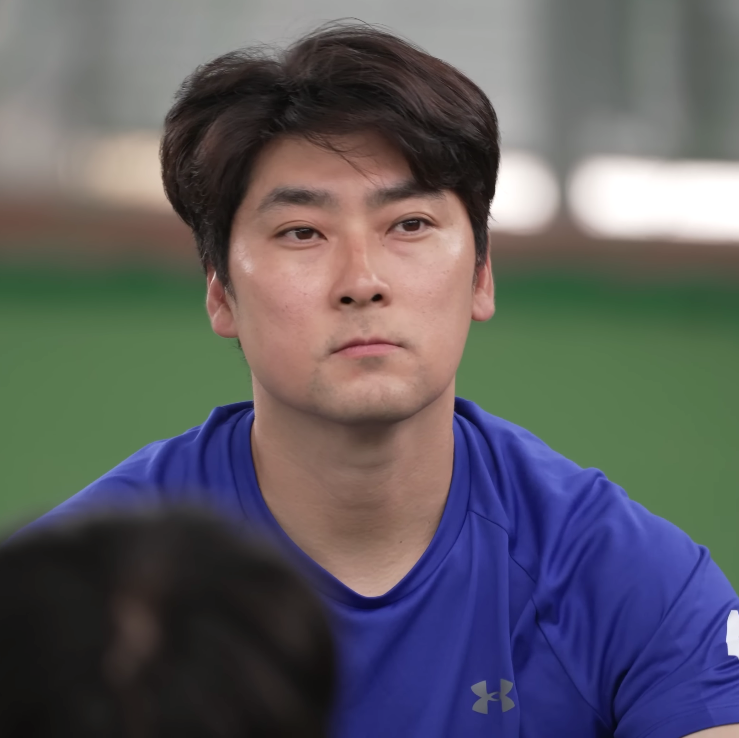
- Lim Chang-min in 2025
- Closer
- Born: August 25, 1985 (age 40); Gwangju, South Korea
- Batted: Right Threw: Right

KBO debut
- June 14, 2009, for the Woori Heroes

Last appearance
- October 4, 2025, for the Samsung Lions

KBO statistics
- Win–loss record: 30–30
- Earned run average: 3.78
- Strikeouts: 552
- Saves: 123
- Stats at Baseball Reference

Teams
- Woori / Nexen Heroes (2009, 2012); NC Dinos (2013–2021); Doosan Bears (2022); Kiwoom Heroes (2023); Samsung Lions (2024–2025)
Medals
Men's baseball
Representing South Korea
2015 WBSC Premier12
| Gold medal – first place | 2015 Tokyo | Team |

- Lim Chang-min
- Hangul: 임창민
- Hanja: 林昶暋
- RR: Im Changmin
- MR: Im Ch'angmin

Lim Chang-min (Korean: 임창민; born August 25, 1985) is a South Korean former professional baseball pitcher for the Samsung Lions of the KBO League.
