= Charlie Shirek =

American baseball player (born 1985)

- Pitcher
- Born: October 25, 1985 (age 41); Minot, North Dakota, U.S.
- Batted: Right Threw: Right

KBO debut
- April 3, 2013, for the NC Dinos

Last KBO appearance
- May 30, 2015, for the NC Dinos

KBO statistics
- Win–loss record: 27–20
- Earned run average: 3.44
- Strikeouts: 237
- Stats at Baseball Reference

Teams
- NC Dinos (2013–2015)

Charles J. Shirek (born October 25, 1985) is an American former professional baseball pitcher. He played in the KBO League for the NC Dinos from 2013 to 2015.

== Career ==
=== Chicago White Sox ===
Shirek attended the University of Nebraska–Lincoln, where he played college baseball for the Nebraska Cornhuskers baseball team. The Chicago White Sox selected Shirek in the 23rd round, with the 719th overall pick, of the 2007 Major League Baseball draft. He made his professional debut with the Single–A Kannapolis Intimidators. Shirek returned to Kannapolis in 2008, making 22 appearances (21 starts) and logging a 6–6 record and 3.54 ERA with 82 strikeouts over 112 innings pitched.

Shirek split the 2009 campaign between the High–A Winston-Salem Dash and Double–A Birmingham Barons, accumulating a 14–5 record and 3.59 ERA with 76 strikeouts across 155 1/3 innings pitched. In 2010, he split time between Birmingham and the Triple–A Charlotte Knights, registering a cumulative 4.26 ERA with 40 strikeouts over 15 games (14 starts). Shirek spent 2011 with Winston-Salem and Birmingham, compiling a 4–8 record and 4.34 ERA with 68 strikeouts and 1 save in 34 appearances (10 starts).

In 2012, Shirek pitched to an 11–5 win–loss record with a 3.65 earned run average (ERA) and 117 strikeouts for the Charlotte Knights of the Triple–A International League. His performance led the White Sox to add him to their 40-man roster on November 19, 2012, in order to protect him from the Rule 5 draft. However, on December 18, the White Sox released Shirek so that he could pursue an opportunity playing in Asia.

=== NC Dinos ===
Following his release from the White Sox, Shirek signed with the NC Dinos of the KBO League. In 2013, he had an 11–7 win-loss record with 116 strikeouts and a 2.48 ERA, which led KBO. After the season, he re–signed with the Dinos to play until 2015.

On June 24, 2014, Shirek threw a no-hitter, becoming the 11th pitcher and the first non-Korean player to record a no-hitter in KBO history. He finished the season having compiled a 12–8 record and 3.81 ERA with 92 strikeouts over 28 starts. In 2015, Shirek made 12 starts for the Dinos, posting a 4–5 record and 5.74 ERA with 29 strikeouts across 53 1/3 innings pitched. On June 10, 2015, Shirek was released by the Dinos following the signing of Zach Stewart.

=== Chicago White Sox (second stint) ===
On January 7, 2016, Shirek signed a minor league contract with the Chicago White Sox. He made one appearance for the Triple–A Charlotte Knights, allowing two runs on three hits over one inning pitched. After a brief stint on the injured list, Shirek was released by the White Sox organization on May 24.

=== Fargo-Moorhead RedHawks ===
On June 15, 2016, Shirek signed with the Fargo-Moorhead RedHawks of the American Association of Independent Professional Baseball. He started for the team that day, allowing 5 runs (4 earned) on 4 hits with 2 strikeouts in 4 1/3 innings of work. Shirek was released by the team the following day.
