= Masan Baseball Stadium =

Baseball stadium in Changwon, South Korea

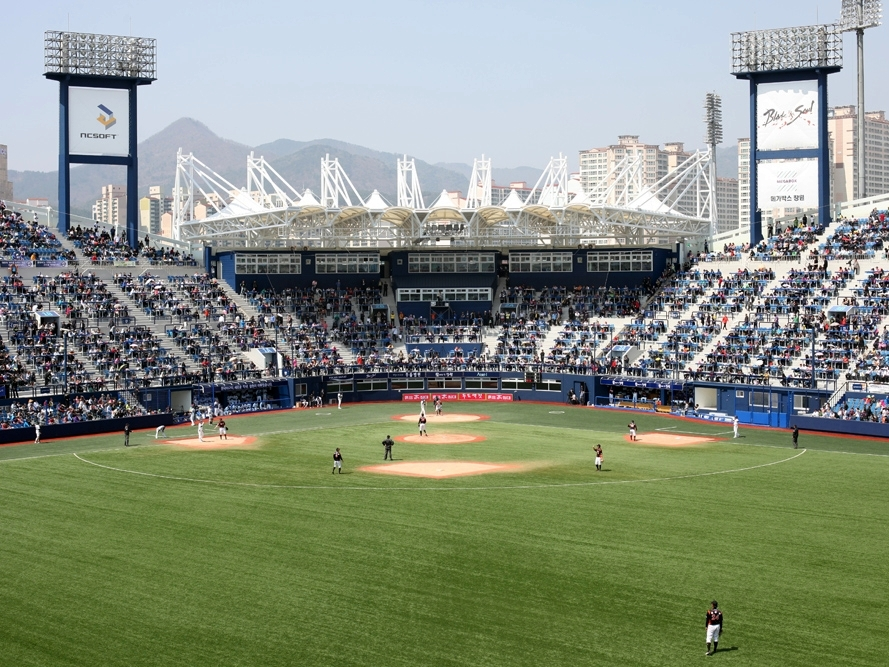
- Masan Baseball Stadium
- Interactive map of Masan Baseball Stadium
- Location: Yangdeok 1-dong Masanhoewon-gu, Changwon, South Korea
- Coordinates: 35°13′15.0″N 128°34′51.4″E
- Capacity: 11,000
- Surface: Natural grass
- Field size: Left Field – 97 metres (318 ft); Left-Center – 110 metres (361 ft); Center Field – 116 metres (381 ft); Right-Center – 110 metres (361 ft); Right Field – 97 metres (318 ft); Outfield Wall Height – 3.8 metres (12 ft)

Construction
- Opened: September 24, 1982

Tenants
- Lotte Giants (1982–2010); NC Dinos (2012–2018)

Masan Baseball Stadium is a baseball stadium in Changwon, South Korea. The stadium has an all-seated capacity of 11,000. The KBO League club Lotte Giants played a handful of their home games in this stadium each season as their secondary stadium until 2010 (with the majority of their games being played at Sajik Baseball Stadium). Masan Baseball Stadium was the home stadium of the NC Dinos between 2012 and 2018, when they moved to the newly built Changwon Baseball Stadium.
