= Lotte Giants =

Baseball club from South Korea

- 롯데 자이언츠

Logo	Cap insignia

Information
- League: KBO League (1982–present)
- Location: Busan
- Ballpark: Sajik Baseball Stadium (1986–present); Ulsan Munsu Baseball Stadium (2014–present)
- Established: 1975; 51 years ago
- Korean Series championships: 1984, 1992
- Former ballparks: Gudeok Baseball Stadium (1982–1985); Masan Baseball Stadium (1982–2010)
- Colors: White, red, sky blue and navy blue
- Mascot: Noori, Ahra, Pini and Win-G
- Retired numbers: 10, 11
- Ownership: Lotte Corporation
- General manager: Lee Taek-keun
- Manager: Lee Dong-wook
- Website: www.giantsclub.com

The Lotte Giants (Korean: 롯데 자이언츠) are a South Korean professional baseball team based in Busan. They are a member of the KBO League. The Lotte Giants are owned by Lotte Corporation.

From 1982 through 1985, they played at Gudeok Baseball Stadium and since then have played at Sajik Baseball Stadium. They have won the Korean Series twice, in 1984 and 1992. The team drew about 1.38 million spectators during the 2009 season, a record which remains as the highest attendance in a single season in any South Korean sports league. They are often called the Busan Seagulls (Korean: 부산 갈매기) because the official bird of the city of Busan is the seagull, and their main fight song is Moon Seung-jae's "Busan Seagulls".

== History ==
Old mascot emblem

=== Origins ===
The Lotte Giants were founded by Lotte Confectionery on 6 May 1975 as an amateur baseball team of the Korea Baseball Association, and were based in Seoul. In February 1982, the Giants became professional and moved to Busan, where they remain to this day.

=== 1980s ===
The Lotte Giants made their KBO League debut against the Haitai Tigers at Gudeok Baseball Stadium on 28 March 1982. They defeated the Tigers 14–2, but finished the year in fifth place out of six teams with a .388 winning percentage. Choi Dong-won, Ryu Du-yeol and Sim Jae-won of the South Korea national baseball team postponed joining the Giants to play for the country in the 1982 Amateur World Series, held in Seoul.

In 1984, the Giants won their first Korean Series title in the third season after the KBO League was launched. They beat the Samsung Lions 4–3 in the Korean Series. They were led by Choi Dong-won, one of the most dominant pitchers in the Korea Professional Baseball league, who finished the 1984 season with 27 wins, 223 strikeouts, and a 2.40 ERA and won the regular season MVP Award. In the 1984 Korean Series, he appeared in five out of seven games, had a 4–1 record (one shutout, three complete games, and one five-inning relief appearance), and pitched 40 innings in ten days.

The Giants made one of the biggest trades in KBO League history after the 1988 season when they sent their star pitcher Choi Dong-won and Kim Yong-chul to the Samsung Lions, and received hitter Jang Hyo-jo and pitcher Kim Si-jin.

=== 1990s ===
The Giants made it back to the Korean Series in 1995 and 1999, losing both times. They have not appeared in the Korean Series since 1999.

=== 2000s ===
From 2001 to 2007 the Giants did not qualify for the postseason, finishing in last place for four consecutive years (2001–2004). In mid-2001, the Giants' manager Kim Myung-seong, who had been in charge of the team since 1998, died of a heart attack. He was replaced by Woo Yong-deuk.

Late in 2007, the Giants signed American Jerry Royster to become the manager of the Giants, making him the first-ever non-Korean to take the helm of one of South Korea's professional baseball clubs. Royster served as the Giants' manager through the 2010 season, guiding the team to the playoffs in all three seasons.

== Popularity and attendance ==
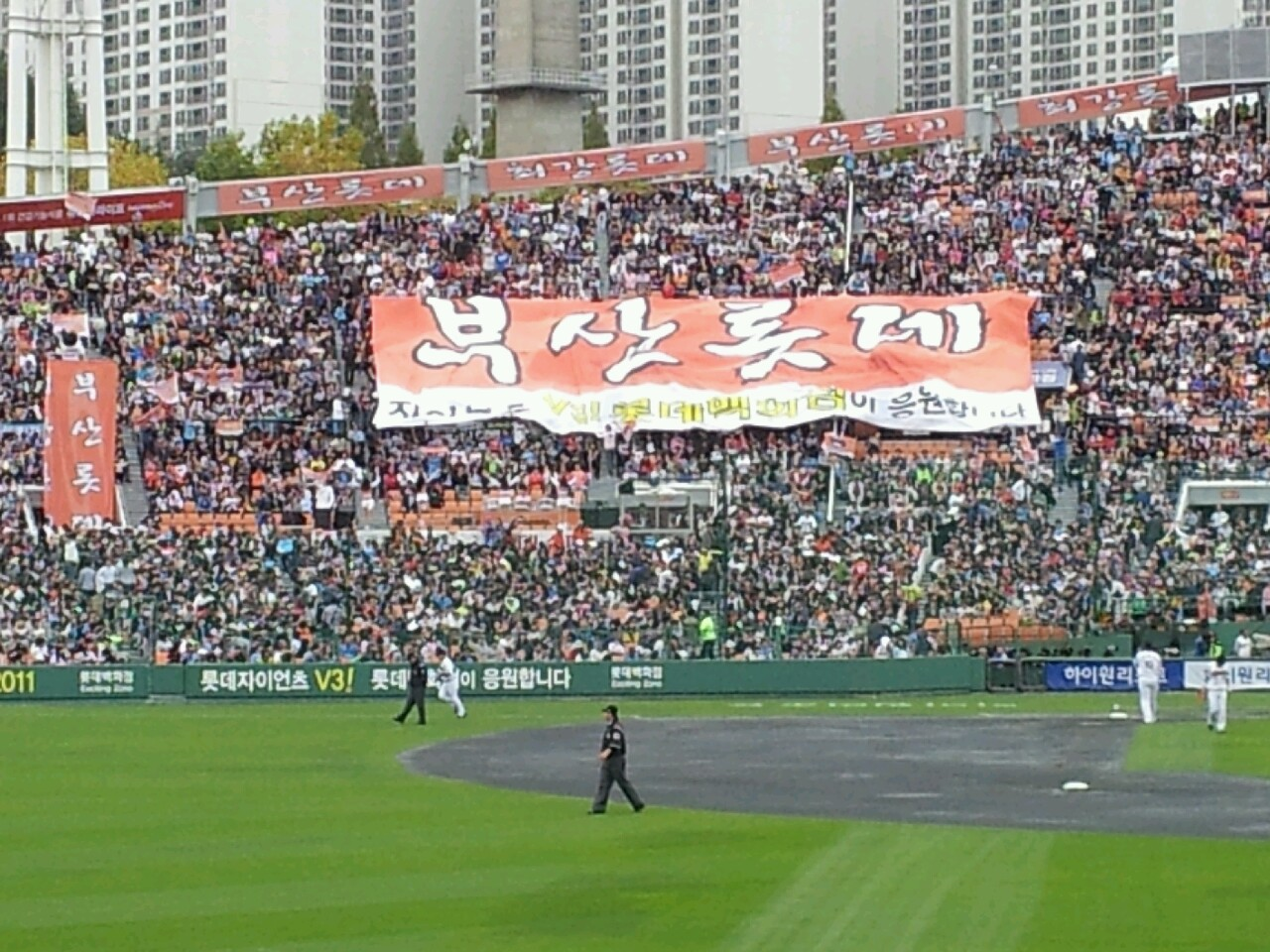
Fans cheering for the Giants at Sajik Baseball Stadium in 2011.

The Giants are one of the most popular teams in the Korea Baseball Organization. According to a Gallup Korea's survey conducted in 2011, the Giants were voted as the most popular team three times in a row. In 1991, they became the first Korean team to attract more than one million spectators to their home games during a season. In the 2009 season, they set the all-time record of home attendance of 1,380,018 fans. In the 2011 season, they also led the league in the total home attendance with 1,358,322 fans at 67 home games. The average attendance was 20,273 fans per game, meaning the stadium was 71% full on average per game. From 2008 to 2012, they drew over 1 million fans for five consecutive seasons.

== Season-by-season records ==
Season	Stadium	League	Finish	Regular season									Postseason	Awards
Season	Stadium	League	Finish	Rank	Games	Wins	Losses	Draws	Win%	BA	HR	ERA	Postseason	Awards
1982	Gudeok Baseball Stadium	KBO	5/6	5/6	40	13	27	0	.325	.256	59	3.95	Did not qualify	
1982	Gudeok Baseball Stadium	KBO	5/6	4/6	40	18	22	0	.450	.256	59	3.95	Did not qualify	
1983	Gudeok Baseball Stadium	KBO	6/6	4/6	50	22	27	1	.449	.244	78	3.79	Did not qualify	
1983	Gudeok Baseball Stadium	KBO	6/6	6/6	50	21	29	0	.420	.244	78	3.79	Did not qualify	
1984	Gudeok Baseball Stadium	KBO	1/6	4/6	50	21	28	1	.429	.257	71	3.31	Won Korean Series vs. Samsung Lions (4–3)	Choi Dong-won (MVP)
1984	Gudeok Baseball Stadium	KBO	1/6	1/6	50	29	20	1	.592	.257	71	3.31	Won Korean Series vs. Samsung Lions (4–3)	Choi Dong-won (MVP)
1985	Gudeok Baseball Stadium	KBO	2/6	4/6	55	27	28	0	.491	.256	77	3.05	Did not qualify	
1985	Gudeok Baseball Stadium	KBO	2/6	2/6	55	32	23	0	.582	.256	77	3.05	Did not qualify	
1986	Sajik Baseball Stadium	KBO	5/7	3/7	54	30	20	4	.600	.248	37	2.74	Did not qualify	
1986	Sajik Baseball Stadium	KBO	5/7	5/7	54	20	32	2	.385	.248	37	2.74	Did not qualify	
1987	Sajik Baseball Stadium	KBO	3/7	3/7	54	27	25	2	.519	.268	40	3.36	Did not qualify	
1987	Sajik Baseball Stadium	KBO	3/7	3/7	54	27	24	3	.528	.268	40	3.36	Did not qualify	
1988	Sajik Baseball Stadium	KBO	3/7	4/7	54	29	24	1	.546	.270	68	3.59	Did not qualify	
1988	Sajik Baseball Stadium	KBO	3/7	3/7	54	28	25	1	.528	.270	68	3.59	Did not qualify	
1989	Sajik Baseball Stadium	KBO	7/7	7/7	120	48	67	5	.421	.247	38	3.91	Did not qualify	
1990	Sajik Baseball Stadium	KBO	6/7	6/7	120	44	71	4	.388	.245	41	4.43	Did not qualify	
1991	Sajik Baseball Stadium	KBO	4/8	4/8	126	61	62	3	.496	.260	73	3.91	Lost semi-playoff vs. Samsung Lions (1–1–2)	
1992	Sajik Baseball Stadium	KBO	1/8	3/8	126	71	55	1	.563	.288	68	4.28	Won semi-playoff vs. Samsung Lions (2–0); Won playoff vs. Haitai Tigers (3–2); Won Korean Series vs. Binggrae Eagles (4–1)	Yeom Jong-seok (ROTY)
1993	Sajik Baseball Stadium	KBO	6/8		126	62	63	1	.496	.248	29	3.33	Did not qualify	
1994	Sajik Baseball Stadium	KBO	6/8		126	56	67	3	.456	.257	58	4.44	Did not qualify	
1995	Sajik Baseball Stadium	KBO	2/8	3/8	126	68	53	5	.560	.255	65	3.47	Won playoff vs. LG Twins (4–2); Lost Korean Series vs. OB Bears (3–4)	
1996	Sajik Baseball Stadium	KBO	5/8		126	57	63	6	.476	.274	72	4.16	Did not qualify	
1997	Sajik Baseball Stadium	KBO	8/8		126	48	77	1	.385	.237	75	4.58	Did not qualify	
1998	Sajik Baseball Stadium	KBO	8/8		126	50	72	4	.410	.255	86	4.61	Did not qualify	
1999	Sajik Baseball Stadium	Dream League	2/8	2/4	132	75	52	5	.591	.291	145	4.18	Won playoff vs. Samsung Lions (4–3); Lost Korean Series vs. Hanwha Eagles (1–4)	
2000	Sajik Baseball Stadium	Magic League	5/8	2/4	133	65	64	4	.504	.260	104	4.02	Lost semi-playoff vs. Samsung Lions (1–2)	
2001	Sajik Baseball Stadium	KBO	8/8		133	59	70	4	.457	.280	121	4.68	Did not qualify	
2002	Sajik Baseball Stadium	KBO	8/8		133	35	97	1	.265	.245	85	4.74	Did not qualify	
2003	Sajik Baseball Stadium	KBO	8/8		133	39	91	3	.300	.256	73	5.01	Did not qualify	
2004	Sajik Baseball Stadium	KBO	8/8		133	50	72	11	.410	.252	88	4.22	Did not qualify	
2005	Sajik Baseball Stadium	KBO	5/8		126	58	67	1	.464	.253	83	4.31	Did not qualify	Son Min-han (MVP)
2006	Sajik Baseball Stadium	KBO	7/8		126	50	73	3	.407	.250	88	3.88	Did not qualify	
2007	Sajik Baseball Stadium	KBO	7/8		126	55	68	3	.447	.270	76	4.14	Did not qualify	
2008	Sajik Baseball Stadium	KBO	3/8	3/8	126	69	57	0	.548	.282	93	3.64	Lost semi-playoff vs. Samsung Lions (0–3)	
2009	Sajik Baseball Stadium	KBO	4/8	4/8	133	66	67	0	.496	.277	121	4.75	Lost semi-playoff vs. Doosan Bears (1–3)	
2010	Sajik Baseball Stadium	KBO	4/8	4/8	133	69	61	3	.531	.288	185	4.82	Lost semi-playoff vs. Doosan Bears (2–3)	Lee Dae-ho (MVP)
2011	Sajik Baseball Stadium	KBO	3/8	2/8	133	72	56	5	.563	.288	111	4.20	Lost playoff vs. SK Wyverns (2–3)	
2012	Sajik Baseball Stadium	KBO	4/8	4/8	133	65	62	6	.512	.263	73	3.48	Won semi-playoff vs. Doosan Bears (3–1); Lost playoff vs. SK Wyverns (2–3)	
2013	Sajik Baseball Stadium	KBO	5/9		128	66	58	4	.532	.261	61	3.93	Did not qualify	
2014	Sajik Baseball Stadium	KBO	7/9		128	59	68	1	.457	.287	121	5.19	Did not qualify	
2015	Sajik Baseball Stadium	KBO	8/10		144	66	77	1	.462	.280	177	5.07	Did not qualify	
2016	Sajik Baseball Stadium	KBO	8/10		144	66	78	0	.458	.288	127	5.63	Did not qualify	
2017	Sajik Baseball Stadium	KBO	3/10	3/10	144	80	62	2	.563	.285	151	4.56	Lost semi-playoff vs. NC Dinos (2–3)	
2018	Sajik Baseball Stadium	KBO	7/10		144	68	74	2	.479	.289	203	5.37	Did not qualify	
2019	Sajik Baseball Stadium	KBO	10/10		144	48	93	3	.340	.250	90	4.83	Did not qualify	
2020	Sajik Baseball Stadium	KBO	7/10		144	71	72	1	.497	.276	131	4.64	Did not qualify	
2021	Sajik Baseball Stadium	KBO	8/10		144	65	71	8	.478	.278	107	5.37	Did not qualify	
2022	Sajik Baseball Stadium	KBO	8/10		144	64	76	4	.457	.267	106	4.45	Did not qualify	
2023	Sajik Baseball Stadium	KBO	7/10		144	68	76	0	.472	.265	69	4.15	Did not qualify	
2024	Sajik Baseball Stadium	KBO	7/10		144	66	74	4	.471	.285	125	5.05	Did not qualify	
2025	Sajik Baseball Stadium	KBO	7/10		144	66	72	6	.478	.267	75	4.75	Did not qualify	
2026	Sajik Baseball Stadium	KBO	7/10		144	64	77	3	.454	.272	113	4.72	Did not qualify	

== Team ==
=== Retired numbers ===
The club's first retired number is Choi Dong-won's squad number 11. Described as one of the top pitchers in the Korea Professional Baseball league, he played for the Giants between 1983 and 1988, and won the KBO MVP award in 1984. Choi died of cancer in 2011. In 2022, the club retired the number 10 in honour of Lee Dae-ho, who spent more than 15 seasons with the Giants.

Choi Dong-won

=== Managers ===
- Park Young-gil (1982–1983)
- Kang Byeong-chel (1983–1986)
- Seong Gi-young (1987)
- Eu Woo-hong (1987–1989)
- Kim Jin-young (1989–1990)
- Shosuke Doi (1990) (caretaker)
- Kang Byeong-chel (1990–1993)
- Kim Yong-hee (1993–1998)
- Kim Myung-seong (1998–2001)
- Woo Yong-deuk (2001–2002)
- Kim Yong-hee (2002) (caretaker)
- Baek In-cheon (2002–2003)
- Kim Yong-cheol (2003) (caretaker)
- Yang Sang-moon (2003–2005)
- Kang Byeong-chel (2005–2007)
- Jerry Royster (2008–2010)
- Yang Seung-ho (2011–2012)
- Kwon Doo-jo (2012) (caretaker)
- Kim Si-jin (2012–2014)
- Lee Jong-un (2014–2015)
- Cho Won-woo (2015–2018)
- Yang Sang-moon (2019)
- Kong Pil-seong (2019) (caretaker)
- Heo Moon-hoi (2020–2021)
- Larry Sutton (2021–2023)
- Lee Jong-un (2023) (caretaker)
- Kim Tae-hyoung (2023–2026)
- Lee Dong-wook (2026–present)
