= NC Dinos =

Baseball team in Changwon, South Korea

- NC 다이노스

Logo	Cap insignia

Information
- League: KBO League (2013–present)
- Location: Changwon
- Ballpark: Changwon NC Park (2019–present)
- Established: 2011; 15 years ago
- Korean Series championships: 2020
- League championships: 2020
- Former ballpark: Masan Baseball Stadium (2012–2018)
- Colors: Blue and gold
- Ownership: NC Corporation
- Manager: Lee Ho-joon
- Website: www.ncdinos.com

The NC Dinos (Korean: NC 다이노스) are a South Korean professional baseball team based in Changwon. They are a member of the KBO League. Since 2019, their home stadium is Changwon NC Park. NC Dinos are owned by video game developer NC Corporation.

== History ==
On 1 July 2010, the cities of Changwon, Masan and Jinhae were integrated into one city, Changwon. As a result of the integration, Changwon became the eleventh largest city in South Korea. Afterward, Changwon drove forward the project, which attracted a baseball team in the city. On 22 December 2010, video game company NCSoft submitted a plan that it wanted to found a baseball team that would be later admitted to the Korea Baseball Organization as a member franchise. Changwon hereby became the first city having a baseball team among all the non-metropolitan cities in South Korea.

In the 2012 season, NC Dinos competed in the unaffiliated Freedom Division of the Korea Baseball Futures League. On 8 May 2012, the Korea Baseball Organization officially approved NC Dinos' admission to the KBO League for the 2013 season.

On 11 April 2013, the NC Dinos won their first game in the club's history against the LG Twins.

As a new team in 2013, the Dinos were allowed three foreign players on their roster (as opposed to the usual two). In 2014, that limit was raised to four (while all non-expansion teams were limited to three). The 2014 Dinos signed pitchers Charlie Shirek, Eric Hacker, Thad Weber, and outfielder Eric Thames.

In November 2020, the Dinos won their first Korean Series championship, four games to two games over the Doosan Bears. This followed the team's first regular season championship, in which the Dinos finished the 2020 regular season in first place for the first time in the team's history.

== Season-by-season records ==
Year	Stadium	Rank	Regular season									Postseason	Awards
Year	Stadium	Rank	Standings	Games	Wins	Losses	Draws	Win%	BA	HR	ERA	Postseason	Awards
2013	Masan; Baseball Stadium	7/9		128	52	72	4	.419	.244	86	3.96	Did not qualify	Lee Jae-hak (ROTY)
2014	Masan; Baseball Stadium	3/9	3/9	128	70	57	1	.551	.282	143	4.29	Lost semi-playoff vs. LG Twins (1–3)	Park Min-woo (ROTY)
2015	Masan; Baseball Stadium	3/10	2/10	144	84	57	3	.596	.289	161	4.26	Lost playoff vs. Doosan Bears (2–3)	Eric Thames (MVP)
2016	Masan; Baseball Stadium	2/10	2/10	144	83	58	3	.589	.291	169	4.48	Won playoff vs. LG Twins (3–1); Lost Korean Series vs. Doosan Bears (0–4)	
2017	Masan; Baseball Stadium	4/10	4/10	144	79	62	3	.560	.293	149	4.71	Won wild card vs. SK Wyverns (1–0); Won semi-playoff vs. Lotte Giants (3–2); Lost playoff vs. Doosan Bears (1–3)	
2018	Masan; Baseball Stadium	10/10		144	58	85	1	.406	.261	143	5.48	Did not qualify	
2019	Changwon; NC Park	5/10	5/10	144	73	69	2	.514	.278	128	4.01	Lost wild card vs. LG Twins (0–1)	
2020	Changwon; NC Park	1/10	1/10	144	83	55	6	.601	.291	187	4.58	Won Korean Series vs. Doosan Bears (4–2)	
2021	Changwon; NC Park	7/10		144	67	68	9	.496	.261	170	4.54	Did not qualify	
2022	Changwon; NC Park	6/10		144	67	74	3	.475	.257	105	3.90	Did not qualify	
2023	Changwon; NC Park	4/10	4/10	144	75	67	2	.528	.270	98	3.83	Won wild card vs. Doosan Bears (1–0); Won semi-playoff vs. SSG Landers (3–0); Lost playoff vs. KT Wiz (2–3)	Erick Fedde (MVP)
2024	Changwon; NC Park	9/10		144	61	81	2	.430	.274	172	5.00	Did not qualify	
2025	Changwon; NC Park	5/10	5/10	144	71	67	6	.514	.260	128	4.82	Lost wild card vs. Samsung Lions (1–1)	
2026	Changwon; NC Park	8/10		144	64	78	2	.451	.270	134	4.79	Did not qualify	

== Managers ==
- Kim Kyung-moon (2012–2018)
- You Young-jun (2018) (caretaker)
- Lee Dong-wook (2019–2022)
- Kang In-kwon (2022–2024)
- Lee Ho-joon (2024–present)

== Mascot ==
The NC Dinos have two mascots. Sseri is a green Brontosaurus that wears a necklace and has affectionately been nicknamed "Swole Daddy" by SB Nation. The Dinos' other mascot, Dandi, is a blue Tyrannosaurus.
