= 2010 Pacific League Climax Series =

Japanese baseball series

First stage
Team (Wins)		Manager	Season
Chiba Lotte Marines (2)		Norifumi Nishimura	75–67–2 (.528), 2½ GB
Saitama Seibu Lions (0)		Hisanobu Watanabe	78–65–1 (.545), 0 GB
- Dates: October 9–10

Final stage
Team (Wins)		Manager	Season
Chiba Lotte Marines (4)		Norifumi Nishimura	75–67–2 (.528), 2½ GB
Fukuoka SoftBank Hawks (3)		Koji Akiyama	76–63–5 (.547), 0 GA
- Dates: October 14–19
- MVP: First Stage: Tomoya Satozaki (Lotte); Final Stage: Yoshihisa Naruse (Lotte)

The 2010 Pacific League Climax Series (PLCS) consisted of two consecutive series, Stage 1 being a best-of-three series and Stage 2 being a best-of-six with the top seed being awarded a one-win advantage. The winner of the series advanced to the 2010 Japan Series, where they competed against the 2010 Central League Climax Series winner. The top three regular-season finishers played in the two series. The PLCS began on with the first game of Stage 1 on October 9 and ended with the final game of Stage 2 on October 19.

== First stage ==
=== Summary ===
Chiba Lotte Marines won the series, 2–0.

Game	Date	Score	Location	Time	Attendance
1	October 9	Chiba Lotte Marines – 6, Saitama Seibu Lions – 5 (11)	Seibu Dome	4:23	33,918
2	October 10	Chiba Lotte Marines – 5, Saitama Seibu Lions – 4 (11)	Seibu Dome	4:19	33,911

=== Game 1 ===
Saturday, October 9, 2010 at Seibu Dome in Tokorozawa, Saitama Prefecture
Team	1	2	3	4	5	6	7	8	9	10	11	R	H	E
Lotte	0	0	0	0	0	0	0	1	4	0	1	6	11	2
Seibu	0	1	0	0	0	0	0	4	0	0	0	5	13	0
WP: Hiroyuki Kobayashi (1–0) LP: Yoshihiro Doi (0–1); Home runs: LOT: Tsuyoshi Nishioka (1), Kazuya Fukuura (1); SEI: Takeya Nakamura (1)

=== Game 2 ===
Sunday, October 10, 2010 at Seibu Dome in Tokorozawa, Saitama Prefecture
Team	1	2	3	4	5	6	7	8	9	10	11	R	H	E
Lotte	0	1	0	0	0	1	1	0	1	0	1	5	12	0
Seibu	3	0	1	0	0	0	0	0	0	0	0	4	9	1
WP: Tatsuya Uchi (1–0) LP: Chikara Onodera (0–1) Sv: Hiroyuki Kobayashi (1); Home runs: LOT: Toshiaki Imae (1), Tomoya Satozaki (1); SEI: None

== Final stage ==
=== Summary ===
Chiba Lotte Marines won the series, 4–3*.

Game	Date	Score	Location	Time	Attendance
1	October 14	Chiba Lotte Marines – 3, Fukuoka SoftBank Hawks – 1	Yahoo Dome	3:21	35,118
2	October 15	Chiba Lotte Marines – 1, Fukuoka SoftBank Hawks – 3	Yahoo Dome	2:30	35,876
3	October 16	Chiba Lotte Marines – 0, Fukuoka SoftBank Hawks – 1	Yahoo Dome	2:56	36,664
4	October 17	Chiba Lotte Marines – 4, Fukuoka SoftBank Hawks – 2	Yahoo Dome	3:23	36,235
5	October 18	Chiba Lotte Marines – 5, Fukuoka SoftBank Hawks – 2	Yahoo Dome	3:17	33,108
6	October 19	Chiba Lotte Marines – 7, Fukuoka SoftBank Hawks – 0	Yahoo Dome	2:47	33,515

* The Pacific League regular season champion is given a one-game advantage in the Final Stage.

=== Game 1 ===
Thursday, October 14, 2010 at Fukuoka Yahoo! Japan Dome in Fukuoka, Fukuoka Prefecture
Team	1	2	3	4	5	6	7	8	9	R	H	E
Lotte	0	3	0	0	0	0	0	0	0	3	7	0
SoftBank	0	0	0	0	1	0	0	0	0	1	4	0
WP: Yoshihisa Naruse (1–0) LP: Toshiya Sugiuchi (0–1); Home runs: LOT: Shoitsu Omatsu (1); SOF: None

=== Game 2 ===
Friday, October 15, 2010 at Fukuoka Yahoo! Japan Dome in Fukuoka, Fukuoka Prefecture
Team	1	2	3	4	5	6	7	8	9	R	H	E
Lotte	1	0	0	0	0	0	0	0	0	1	2	3
SoftBank	0	2	1	0	0	0	0	0	X	3	4	0
WP: Tsuyoshi Wada (1–0) LP: Hayden Penn (0–1); Home runs: LOT: Ikuhiro Kiyota (1); SOF: None

=== Game 3 ===
Saturday, October 16, 2010 at Fukuoka Yahoo! Japan Dome in Fukuoka, Fukuoka Prefecture
Team	1	2	3	4	5	6	7	8	9	R	H	E
Lotte	0	0	0	0	0	0	0	0	0	0	4	1
SoftBank	1	0	0	0	0	0	0	0	X	1	4	0
WP: Dennis Houlton (1–0) LP: Bill Murphy (0–1) Sv: Takahiro Mahara (1)

=== Game 4 ===
Sunday, October 17, 2010 at Fukuoka Yahoo! Japan Dome in Fukuoka, Fukuoka Prefecture
Team	1	2	3	4	5	6	7	8	9	R	H	E
Lotte	0	1	0	1	0	1	0	0	1	4	8	0
SoftBank	0	0	0	0	0	0	0	0	2	2	7	0
WP: Shunsuke Watanabe (1–0) LP: Yao-Hsun Yang (0–1) Sv: Hiroyuki Kobayashi (1); Home runs: LOT: Makoto Imaoka (1); SOF: None

=== Game 5 ===
Monday, October 18, 2010 at Fukuoka Yahoo! Japan Dome in Fukuoka, Fukuoka Prefecture
Team	1	2	3	4	5	6	7	8	9	R	H	E
Lotte	0	0	0	0	0	0	3	0	2	5	11	0
SoftBank	1	0	0	0	0	0	0	1	0	2	7	0
WP: Tatsuya Uchi (1–0) LP: Brian Falkenborg (0–1) Sv: Hiroyuki Kobayashi (2); Home runs: LOT: Ikuhiro Kiyota (2); SOF: None

=== Game 6 ===
Tuesday, October 19, 2010 at Fukuoka Yahoo! Japan Dome in Fukuoka, Fukuoka Prefecture
Team	1	2	3	4	5	6	7	8	9	R	H	E
Lotte	0	0	0	0	4	0	0	3	0	7	10	1
SoftBank	0	0	0	0	0	0	0	0	0	0	4	0
WP: Yoshihisa Naruse (2–0) LP: Toshiya Sugiuchi (0–2); Home runs: LOT: Shoitsu Omatsu (2); SOF: None
