= 2010 Japan Series =

Team (Wins)	Managers	Season
Chiba Lotte Marines (4)	Norifumi Nishimura	75–67–2, (.528), GB: 2.5
Chunichi Dragons (2)	Hiromitsu Ochiai	79–62–3, (.560), GA: 1
- Dates: October 30 – November 7
- MVP: Toshiaki Imae (Chiba Lotte)
- FSA: Kazuhiro Wada (Chunichi)

Broadcast
- Television: TV Aichi (Game 1, also on TV Osaka); Tokai TV (Game 2, only in the Chukyo region); TV Asahi (Game 3, ANN, except Fukui Broadcasting and TV Miyazaki); TV Tokyo (Game 4, TXN, Gifu Broadcasting, Mie TV, KBS Kyoto, Biwako Broadcasting, Nara TV and TV Wakayama); Chiba TV (Game 5, also on Mie TV); CBC (Game 5, only in the Chukyo region); Tokai TV and Fuji TV (Games 6 and 7, FNN, except TV Oita (both) and TV Miyazaki (Game 7))
- TV announcers: Daisuke Takagi (TV Aichi, Game 1); Atsushi Moriwaki (Tokai TV, Games 2 and 6); Takao Nakayama (TV Asahi, Game 3); Tomoki Uekusa (TV Tokyo, Game 4); Koji Kurosawa (free-lance, Game 5 on Chiba TV); Hiroyuki Takada (CBC, Game 5); Masaharu Miyake (Fuji TV, Game 7)

The 2010 Japan Series was the championship series of Nippon Professional Baseball (NPB) for the 2010 season. The 61st edition of the Series, it was a best-of-seven playoff that featured the Pacific League champion Chiba Lotte Marines against the Central League champion Chunichi Dragons.

== Climax Series ==
First Stage
Central League
2	Hanshin Tigers	0
3	Yomiuri Giants	2
Pacific League
2	Saitama Seibu Lions	0
3	Chiba Lotte Marines	2

Final Stage
1	Chunichi Dragons	4
3	Yomiuri Giants	1
1	Fukuoka SoftBank Hawks	3
3	Chiba Lotte Marines	4

Japan Series
CL1	Chunichi Dragons	2
PL3	Chiba Lotte Marines	4

== Summary ==
Chiba Lotte Marines won the series, 4–2.

Game	Date	Score	Location	Time	Attendance
1	October 30	Chiba Lotte Marines – 5, Chunichi Dragons – 2	Nagoya Dome	3:27	38,066
2	October 31	Chiba Lotte Marines – 1, Chunichi Dragons – 12	Nagoya Dome	3:23	38,065
3	November 2	Chunichi Dragons – 1, Chiba Lotte Marines – 7	Chiba Marine Stadium	2:47	26,923
4	November 3	Chunichi Dragons – 4, Chiba Lotte Marines – 3	Chiba Marine Stadium	4:41	27,197
5	November 4	Chunichi Dragons – 4, Chiba Lotte Marines – 10 (11)	Chiba Marine Stadium	3:22	27,209
6	November 6	Chiba Lotte Marines – 2, Chunichi Dragons – 2 (15)	Nagoya Dome	5:43	38,094
7	November 7	Chiba Lotte Marines – 8, Chunichi Dragons – 7 (12)	Nagoya Dome	4:56	38,075

== Background ==
=== Chiba Lotte Marines ===
In what was a roller coaster of a year for seemingly the entire Pacific League, the Chiba Lotte Marines finished third in the league behind the second-place Saitama Seibu Lions and the first-place Fukuoka SoftBank Hawks. In the first round, Lotte earned the nickname "Miracle Marines" after pulling off two extra-inning wins, the first of which came thanks to a four-run 9th inning comeback against Seibu. Lotte continued their comeback trend after rallying from a 3-games-to-1 deficit against the Hawks to win the Pacific League title, their first since 2005.

The team was led by a rookie manager, former player Norifumi Nishimura. Many of the team's components from the 2005 championship year were still in place, as Tsuyoshi Nishioka, Toshiaki Imae, Saburo Ohmura, and Kazuya Fukuura were all still in the lineup and contributing. New faces littered the pitching staff and the lineup, as Yoshihisa Naruse won 13 games and was the ace of the staff, but the Marines' true pitching strength came from the back end of the bullpen, with one-time Major Leaguer Yasuhiko Yabuta, Takuya Furuya and Tatsuya Uchi, all potent middle relievers, setting up for starter-turned-closer Hiroyuki Kobayashi.

=== Chunichi Dragons ===
The Dragons had been perennial contenders in the Central League, but had been ousted in the Climax Series by the Giants each of the last two years. Chunichi took first place in the CL and defeated their rivals to reach the Japan Series, needing just four games to do so. Chunichi owned the lowest team ERA in the league at just 3.29, but were next to last in stolen bases and in team batting average.

Despite using 13 different starters during the season, the Dragons still had a potent pitching staff. Taiwanese lefty Wei-Yin Chen led the team with 13 wins, while Kazuki Yoshimi had 12. Like the Marines, the Dragons' strength was the back of their bullpen. Takuya Asao and Akifumi Takahashi made for a potent two-headed relief monster, as they combined for 78 holds. Hitoki Iwase, the team's longtime closer, recorded 42 saves in 2010.

== Game summaries ==
=== Game 1 ===
Saturday, October 30, 2010, 6:11 pm (JST) at Nagoya Dome in Nagoya, Aichi Prefecture
Team	1	2	3	4	5	6	7	8	9	R	H	E
Lotte	0	1	2	0	0	1	1	0	0	5	13	0
Chunichi	0	2	0	0	0	0	0	0	0	2	6	0
WP: Yoshihisa Naruse (1–0) LP: Kazuki Yoshimi (0–1) Sv: Hiroyuki Kobayashi (1); Home runs: LOT: Ikuhiro Kiyota (1), Tadahito Iguchi (1); CHU: Kazuhiro Wada (1), Motonobu Tanishige (1)

Starting on short rest after the deciding Game 7 win, Naruse was pegged as the Game 1 starter against veteran Kazuki Yoshimi. After matching 1-2-3 innings in the first, Lotte scored the first run of the Japan Series on a two-out RBI double by Shoitsu Omatsu that scored Saburo. However, the Dragons would strike back in the bottom of the inning, as hometown hero Kazuhiro Wada and venerable catcher Motonobu Tanishige, playing in his 5th Japan Series, each hit solo home runs for a 2-1 lead.

However, that lead would he short-lived as Lotte countered with two more runs in the top of the 3rd. Rookie outfielder Ikuhiro Kiyota hit a solo blast of his own after hitting just two in the regular season to tie the score. Tadahito Iguchi legged out an infield single to continue the assault, and Saburo was hit with a pitch to set up 2005 Japan Series MVP Toshiaki Imae. Imae got a base hit that scored Iguchi, but Saburo was thrown out at third trying to get the extra base. Kim Tae-Kyun was hit with a pitch to put Imae in scoring position, but Yoshifumi Okada could not drive him home. Even still, the Marines led, 3-2. That would prove to be the end of the day for Yoshimi, as he gave up three runs on six hits in three innings. He also walked one, struck out two, and hit two batters.

Naruse kept the Chunichi bats off the board through the 5th inning, as he did not let another Dragons runner reach scoring position. The Pacific League Climax Series MVP gave up two runs on four hits, with six strikeouts and a walk on 88 pitches (he was pinch-hit for in the 6th). The Marines bullpen also held the line, as Yabuta, Uchi, and Yoshihiro Itoh all delivered perfect innings, with Yabuta and Itoh each striking out two batters.

Meanwhile, the Marines batters had a little better luck with the Chunichi bullpen, namely Masafumi Hirai. Nishioka hit an RBI single to score Okada, who had reached and was sacrificed to second for the Marines' run in the 6th. In the 7th, Iguchi supplied the offense himself with a solo home run, the fourth total in the game. The blast ran the score to 5-2.

Hiroyuki Kobayashi came on to slam the door like he had since his resurgence as a closer in the second half of the season. Pinch-hitter Kei Nomoto singled his way on to begin the 9th, but he was erased as part of a 6-4-3 double play. Wada also singled, but was thrown out attempting to stretch it into a double to end the game.

=== Game 2 ===
Sunday, October 31, 2010, 6:10 pm (JST) at Nagoya Dome in Nagoya, Aichi Prefecture
Team	1	2	3	4	5	6	7	8	9	R	H	E
Lotte	0	0	0	1	0	0	0	0	0	1	5	2
Chunichi	4	3	3	0	0	2	0	0	X	12	14	0
WP: Chen Wei-Yin (1–0) LP: Bill Murphy (0–1); Home runs: LOT: None; CHU: Tony Blanco (1)

=== Game 3 ===
Tuesday, November 2, 2010, 6:33 pm (JST) at Chiba Marine Stadium in Chiba City, Chiba Prefecture
Team	1	2	3	4	5	6	7	8	9	R	H	E
Chunichi	0	0	1	0	0	0	0	0	0	1	5	0
Lotte	0	0	1	4	0	0	2	0	X	7	10	0
WP: Shunsuke Watanabe (1–0) LP: Kazuki Yoshimi (0–1)

=== Game 4 ===
Wednesday, November 3, 2010, 6:16 pm (JST) at Chiba Marine Stadium in Chiba City, Chiba Prefecture
Team	1	2	3	4	5	6	7	8	9	10	11	R	H	E
Chunichi	0	0	0	2	1	0	0	0	0	0	1	4	12	1
Lotte	0	0	3	0	0	0	0	0	0	0	0	3	9	1
WP: Akifumi Takahashi (1–0) LP: Yoshihiro Ito (0–1) Sv: Hitoki Iwase (1); Home runs: CHU: None; LOT: Tadahito Iguchi (2)

=== Game 5 ===
Thursday, November 4, 2010, 6:30 pm (JST) at Chiba Marine Stadium in Chiba City, Chiba Prefecture
Team	1	2	3	4	5	6	7	8	9	R	H	E
Chunichi	1	0	0	0	0	1	0	2	0	4	8	1
Lotte	4	0	0	2	3	0	1	0	X	10	15	0
WP: Hayden Penn (1–0) LP: Kenichi Nakata (0–1); Home runs: CHU: Tony Blanco (2); LOT: Saburo Ohmura (1)

=== Game 6 ===
Saturday, November 6, 2010, 6:11 pm (JST) at Nagoya Dome in Nagoya, Aichi Prefecture
Team	1	2	3	4	5	6	7	8	9	10	11	12	13	14	15	R	H	E
Lotte	1	0	0	0	0	0	0	1	0	0	0	0	0	0	0	2	8	0
Chunichi	1	0	0	0	0	1	0	0	0	0	0	0	0	0	0	2	11	0

Nicknamed "There are ties in baseball without Bud Selig" after the 2002 MLB All-Star Game friendly that ended as a tie game, because of the result of this game, the 5:43 game was the longest game in history, and in theory is least likely to be eclipsed following a 2018 rule change standardising the limit on extra innings across the regular season and postseason to 12 innings.

Lotte LF Ikuhiro Kiyota's one-out double off Takuya Asao was the game-tying hit in the top of the eighth to knot the game up at 2-2. The teams played 7 1/2 scoreless innings after that, and was tied at the end of the postseason extra innings cap, the 15th inning.

Under the rules of the series, Chunichi had to win Game 7 in order to push it to a Game 8.

=== Game 7 ===
Sunday, November 7, 2010, 6:11 pm (JST) at Nagoya Dome in Nagoya, Aichi Prefecture
Team	1	2	3	4	5	6	7	8	9	10	11	12	R	H	E
Lotte	2	0	0	1	3	0	1	0	0	0	0	1	8	16	0
Chunichi	3	1	2	0	0	0	0	0	1	0	0	0	7	13	1
WP: Yoshihiro Ito (1-1) LP: Takuya Asao (0-1)

The victory parade was held on 21 November in Makuhari.

== See also ==
- 2010 Korean Series
- 2010 World Series
