= 2016 Pacific League Climax Series =

Japanese baseball series

First stage
| Team (Wins) | | Manager | Season |
| Fukuoka SoftBank Hawks (2) | | Kimiyasu Kudo | 83–54–6 (.606), 2½ GB |
| Chiba Lotte Marines (0) | | Tsutomu Ito | 72–68–3 (.514), 15 GB |
- Dates: October 8–9

Final stage
| Team (Wins) | | Manager | Season |
| Hokkaido Nippon-Ham Fighters (4) | | Hideki Kuriyama | 87–53–3 (.621), 2½ GA |
| Fukuoka SoftBank Hawks (2) | | Kimiyasu Kudo | 83–54–6 (.606), 2½ GB |
- Dates: October 12–16
- MVP: Sho Nakata (Nippon-Ham)

The 2016 Pacific League Climax Series (PLCS) consisted of two consecutive series, Stage 1 being a best-of-three series and Stage 2 being a best-of-six with the top seed being awarded a one-win advantage. The winner of the series advanced to the 2016 Japan Series, where they competed against the 2016 Central League Climax Series winner. The top three regular-season finishers played in the two series. The PLCS began on with the first game of Stage 1 on October 10 and ended with the final game of Stage 2 on October 16.

== First stage ==
=== Summary ===
Fukuoka SoftBank Hawks won the series, 2–0.

| Game | Date | Score | Location | Time | Attendance |
|---|---|---|---|---|---|
| 1 | October 8 | Chiba Lotte Marines – 3, Fukuoka SoftBank Hawks – 4 | Yafuoku Dome | 3:10 | 36,077 |
| 2 | October 9 | Chiba Lotte Marines – 1, Fukuoka SoftBank Hawks – 4 | Yafuoku Dome | 3:16 | 38,500 |

=== Game 1 ===
Saturday, October 8, 2016, 1:00 pm (JST) at Fukuoka Yahuoku! Dome in Fukuoka, Fukuoka Prefecture
| Team | 1 | 2 | 3 | 4 | 5 | 6 | 7 | 8 | 9 | R | H | E |
|---|---|---|---|---|---|---|---|---|---|---|---|---|
| Lotte | 2 | 0 | 0 | 0 | 0 | 0 | 0 | 0 | 1 | 3 | 6 | 1 |
| SoftBank | 1 | 0 | 1 | 0 | 0 | 0 | 0 | 2 | X | 4 | 8 | 0 |
WP: Robert Suárez (1–0) LP: Tatsuya Uchi (0–1) Sv: Dennis Sarfate (1); Home runs: LOT: Ikuhiro Kiyota (1), Alfredo Despaigne 2 (2); SOF: Seiichi Uchikawa (1)

=== Game 2 ===
Sunday, October 9, 2016, 1:01 pm (JST) at Fukuoka Yahuoku! Dome in Fukuoka, Fukuoka Prefecture
| Team | 1 | 2 | 3 | 4 | 5 | 6 | 7 | 8 | 9 | R | H | E |
|---|---|---|---|---|---|---|---|---|---|---|---|---|
| Lotte | 1 | 0 | 0 | 0 | 0 | 0 | 0 | 0 | 0 | 1 | 5 | 1 |
| SoftBank | 0 | 0 | 0 | 1 | 1 | 0 | 0 | 2 | X | 4 | 8 | 0 |
WP: Rick van den Hurk (1–0) LP: Ayumu Ishikawa (0–1) Sv: Dennis Sarfate (2); Home runs: LOT: Ikuhiro Kiyota (2); SOF: None

== Final stage ==
=== Summary ===
Hokkaido Nippon-Ham Fighters won the series, 4–2*.

| Game | Date | Score | Location | Time | Attendance |
|---|---|---|---|---|---|
| 1 | October 12 | Fukuoka SoftBank Hawks – 0, Hokkaido Nippon-Ham Fighters – 6 | Sapporo Dome | 2:55 | 36,633 |
| 2 | October 13 | Fukuoka SoftBank Hawks – 6, Hokkaido Nippon-Ham Fighters – 4 | Sapporo Dome | 3:40 | 26,548 |
| 3 | October 14 | Fukuoka SoftBank Hawks – 1, Hokkaido Nippon-Ham Fighters – 4 | Sapporo Dome | 3:17 | 39,456 |
| 4 | October 15 | Fukuoka SoftBank Hawks – 5, Hokkaido Nippon-Ham Fighters – 2 | Sapporo Dome | 3:07 | 41,138 |
| 5 | October 16 | Fukuoka SoftBank Hawks – 4, Hokkaido Nippon-Ham Fighters – 7 | Sapporo Dome | 3:15 | 41,138 |

* The Pacific League regular season champion is given a one-game advantage in the Final Stage.

=== Game 1 ===
Wednesday, October 12, 2016, 6:00 pm (JST) at Sapporo Dome in Sapporo, Hokkaido
| Team | 1 | 2 | 3 | 4 | 5 | 6 | 7 | 8 | 9 | R | H | E |
|---|---|---|---|---|---|---|---|---|---|---|---|---|
| SoftBank | 0 | 0 | 0 | 0 | 0 | 0 | 0 | 0 | 0 | 0 | 1 | 1 |
| Nippon-Ham | 0 | 0 | 0 | 0 | 6 | 0 | 0 | 0 | X | 6 | 9 | 0 |
WP: Shohei Ohtani (1–0) LP: Shota Takeda (0–1); Home runs: SOF: None; NIP: Sho Nakata (1)

=== Game 2 ===
Thursday, October 13, 2016, 6:00 pm (JST) at Sapporo Dome in Sapporo, Hokkaido
| Team | 1 | 2 | 3 | 4 | 5 | 6 | 7 | 8 | 9 | R | H | E |
|---|---|---|---|---|---|---|---|---|---|---|---|---|
| SoftBank | 0 | 2 | 0 | 0 | 0 | 0 | 0 | 1 | 3 | 6 | 11 | 0 |
| Nippon-Ham | 0 | 0 | 0 | 1 | 1 | 2 | 0 | 0 | 0 | 4 | 8 | 0 |
WP: Sho Iwasaki (1–0) LP: Chris Martin (0–1) Sv: Dennis Sarfate (1); Home runs: SOF: Nobuhiro Matsuda (1); NIP: Brandon Laird (1)

=== Game 3 ===
Friday, October 14, 2016, 6:00 pm (JST) at Sapporo Dome in Sapporo, Hokkaido
| Team | 1 | 2 | 3 | 4 | 5 | 6 | 7 | 8 | 9 | R | H | E |
|---|---|---|---|---|---|---|---|---|---|---|---|---|
| SoftBank | 0 | 0 | 1 | 0 | 0 | 0 | 0 | 0 | 0 | 1 | 7 | 0 |
| Nippon-Ham | 4 | 0 | 0 | 0 | 0 | 0 | 0 | 0 | X | 4 | 7 | 0 |
WP: Kohei Arihara (1–0) LP: Kodai Senga (0–1) Sv: Anthony Bass (1); Home runs: SOF: Akira Nakamura (1); NIP: Brandon Laird (2)

=== Game 4 ===
Saturday, October 15, 2016, 2:00 pm (JST) at Sapporo Dome in Sapporo, Hokkaido
| Team | 1 | 2 | 3 | 4 | 5 | 6 | 7 | 8 | 9 | R | H | E |
|---|---|---|---|---|---|---|---|---|---|---|---|---|
| SoftBank | 0 | 1 | 1 | 2 | 0 | 1 | 0 | 0 | 0 | 5 | 12 | 0 |
| Nippon-Ham | 0 | 0 | 0 | 0 | 0 | 2 | 0 | 0 | 0 | 2 | 6 | 2 |
WP: Rick van den Hurk (1–0) LP: Hirotoshi Takanashi (0–1) Sv: Dennis Sarfate (2); Home runs: SOF: Yuya Hasegawa (1), Kenta Imamiya (1), Nobuhiro Matsuda (2); NIP: None

=== Game 5 ===
Sunday, October 16, 2016, 2:00 pm (JST) at Sapporo Dome in Sapporo, Hokkaido
| Team | 1 | 2 | 3 | 4 | 5 | 6 | 7 | 8 | 9 | R | H | E |
|---|---|---|---|---|---|---|---|---|---|---|---|---|
| SoftBank | 4 | 0 | 0 | 0 | 0 | 0 | 0 | 0 | 0 | 4 | 5 | 1 |
| Nippon-Ham | 0 | 1 | 1 | 3 | 2 | 0 | 0 | 0 | X | 7 | 8 | 1 |
WP: Anthony Bass (1–0) LP: Nao Higashihama (0–1) Sv: Shohei Ohtani (1); Home runs: SOF: Nobuhiro Matsuda (3); NIP: Sho Nakata (2)
