= 2010 Korean Series =

Baseball competition in South Korea

The 2010 Korean Series began on Friday, 15 October, at the Munhak Baseball Stadium in Incheon. It featured the SK Wyverns, who had claimed home ground advantage by finishing in first place at the end of the season, and the Samsung Lions, who had finished second and had defeated the Doosan Bears in a best-of-5 playoff series (3 games to 2) to advance to the next round. The SK Wyverns won the series in four games, sweeping the Samsung Lions to collect their third Korean Series championship in four seasons and their third overall.

== Matchups ==
=== Game 1 ===
Friday, October 15, 2010, at Munhak Baseball Stadium in Incheon

Team	1	2	3	4	5	6	7	8	9	R	H	E
Samsung Lions	0	0	0	0	3	1	0	1	0	5	5	1
SK Wyverns	1	0	1	0	3	4	0	0	X	9	11	0
WP: Jung Woo-ram (1-0) LP: Kwon Hyuk (0-1); Home runs: Samsung: Kang Bong-kyu (1, 6th inning off Jung Woo-ram, 0 on, 2 out), Park Sok-min (1, 8th inning off Chong Tae-hyon, 0 on, 0 out); SK: Park Jung-kwon (1, 6th inning off Lee Woo-sun, 1 on, 1 out)

- Kim Kwang-hyun (SK) struck out a new record 6 consecutive batters in Korean Series. (previous record: Kim Soo-kyung (Hyundai) record 5 struck out consecutive batters in 2004)

=== Game 2 ===
Saturday, October 16, 2010, at Munhak Baseball Stadium in Incheon

Team	1	2	3	4	5	6	7	8	9	R	H	E
Samsung Lions	0	1	0	0	0	0	0	0	0	1	5	0
SK Wyverns	0	0	0	2	0	1	0	1	X	4	9	0
WP: Jun Byung-doo (1-0) LP: Cha Woo-chan (0-1) Sv: Song Eun-bum (1); Home runs: Samsung: None; SK: Choi Jeong (1, 4th inning off Cha Woo-chan, 1 on, 0 Out), (2, 6th inning off Cha Woo-chan, 0 on, 0 Out) Park Kyung-oan (1, 8th inning off Kwon Hyuk, 0 on, 1 out)

- Choi Jeong (SK, 23 years and 230 days) set a record of youngest back-to-back home run in Korean Series and five overall. (previous record: Lee Jong-beom(Haitai) 27 years and 68 days in 1997)
- Park Kyung-oan (SK, 38 years and 97 days) set a record of the oldest home run in Korean Series. (previous record: Park Jae-hong(SK) 36 years and 43 days in 2009)

=== Game 3 ===
Monday, October 18, 2010, at Daegu Baseball Stadium in Daegu

Team	1	2	3	4	5	6	7	8	9	R	H	E
SK Wyverns	2	0	0	0	0	0	0	2	0	4	8	0
Samsung Lions	1	0	0	0	0	0	0	0	1	2	7	0
WP: Lee Seung-ho (1-0) LP: Bae Young-soo (0-1) Sv: Lee Seung-ho (1)

=== Game 4 ===
Tuesday, October 19, 2010, at Daegu Baseball Stadium in Daegu

Team	1	2	3	4	5	6	7	8	9	R	H	E
SK Wyverns	0	0	0	3	0	1	0	0	0	4	8	2
Samsung Lions	0	0	0	0	0	0	0	1	1	2	5	0
WP: Jun Byung-doo (2-0) LP: Jang Won-sam (0-1) Sv: Kim Kwang-hyun (1)

First baseman/Right fielder Park Jung-kwon was named the series MVP.
