= Kwon Hyuk =

Kwon Hyuk may refer to:

- Kwon Hyuk (baseball)
- Kwon Hyuk (actor)
- Dean (South Korean singer) (Kwon Hyuk)
