= Tomoya Satozaki =

Japanese baseball player

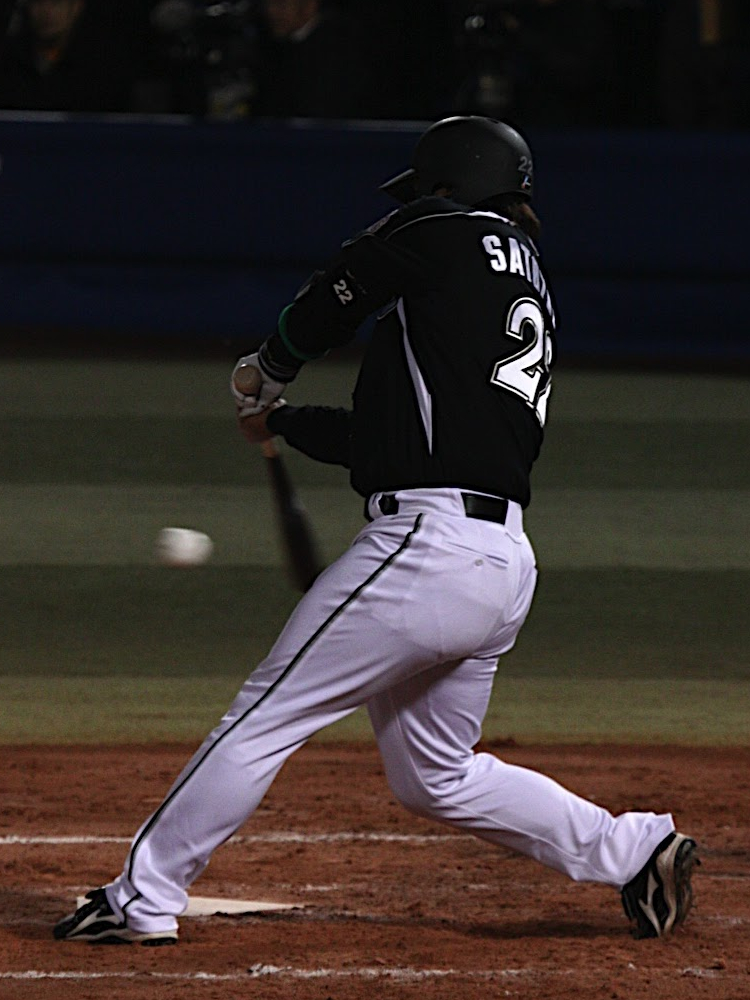
- Catcher
- Born: May 20, 1976 (age 50); Naruto, Tokushima, Japan
- Batted: Right Threw: Right

NPB debut
- April 6, 2000, for the Chiba Lotte Marines

Last appearance
- September 28, 2014, for the Chiba Lotte Marines

NPB statistics
- Batting average: .256
- Home runs: 108
- Runs batted in: 458
- Stats at Baseball Reference

Teams
- Chiba Lotte Marines (1999–2014)

Career highlights and awards
- 2x Japan Series champion (2005, 2010); 2010 PLCS First Stage MVP
Medals
Representing Japan
Men's baseball
World Baseball Classic
Gold medal – first place	2006 San Diego	Team

Tomoya Satozaki (里崎 智也, Satozaki Tomoya; born May 20, 1976, in Naruto, Tokushima, Japan) is a former Japanese professional baseball catcher. He played his entire career in Nippon Professional Baseball (NPB) for the Chiba Lotte Marines. He played for Japan in the 2006 World Baseball Classic, and made the 2006 All-World Baseball Classic team.

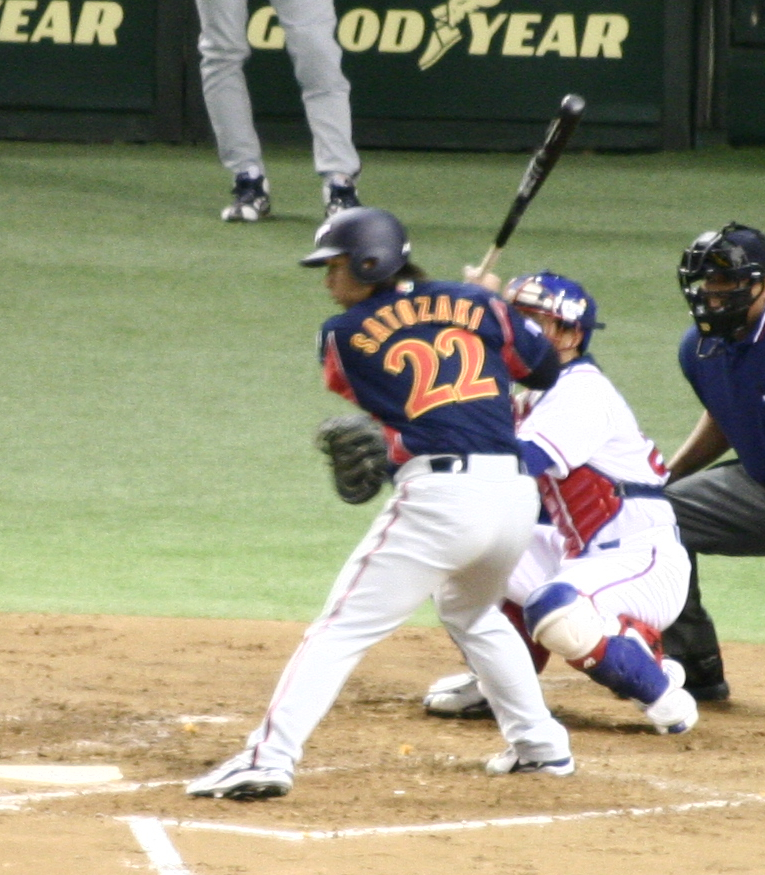
Satozaki batting for Japan in the 2006 World Baseball Classic
