= Yoshifumi Okada =

Japanese baseball player (born 1984)

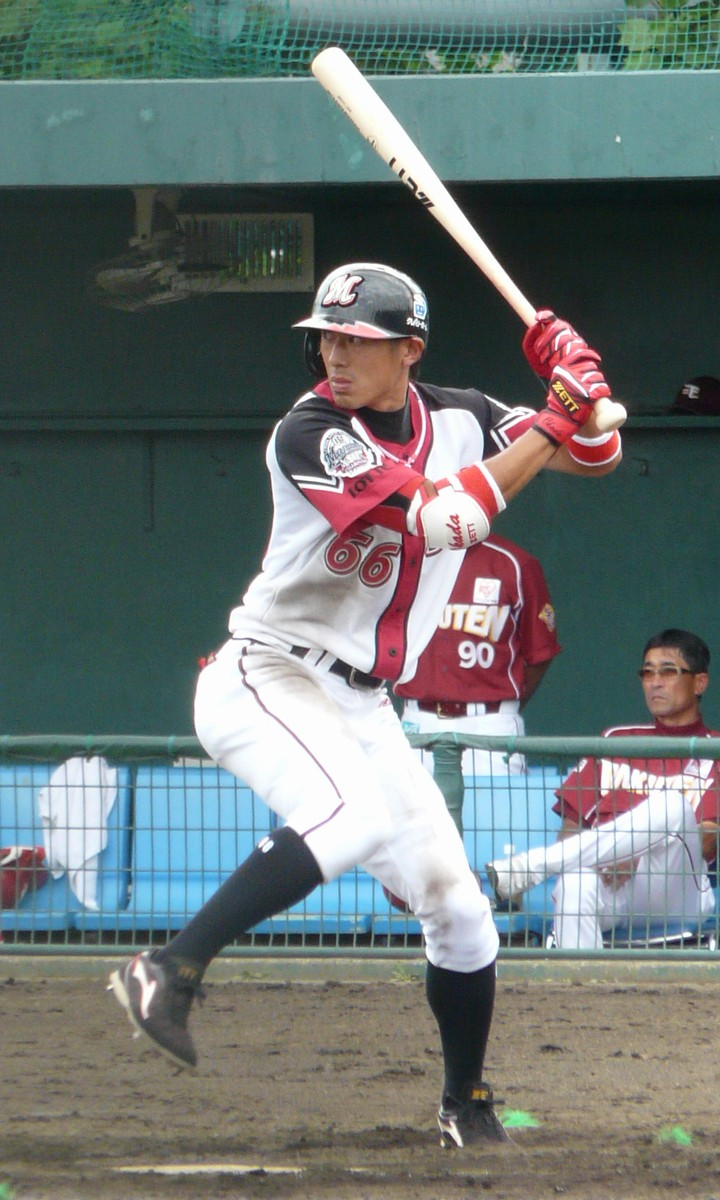
- Okada with the Chiba Lotte Marines
- Outfielder / Coach
- Born: July 6, 1984 (age 42)
- Batted: Left Threw: Left

NPB debut
- June 1, 2010, for the Chiba Lotte Marines

Last appearance
- October 8, 2018, for the Chiba Lotte Marines

NPB statistics
- Batting average: .255
- Hits: 573
- RBI: 119
- Stolen Bases: 142
- Home runs: 0
- Stats at Baseball Reference

Teams
- As player: Chiba Lotte Marines (2010–2018); As coach: Tochigi Golden Braves (2019–2020); Tohoku Rakuten Golden Eagles (2021–2024)

Career highlights and awards
- 2× Pacific League Golden Glove Award (2011, 2012); Japan Series champion (2010)

Yoshifumi Okada (岡田 幸文, born July 6, 1984, in Takanezawa, Tochigi) is a Japanese former professional baseball outfielder. He played for the Chiba Lotte Marines in Japan's Nippon Professional Baseball from 2010 to 2018.
