= Yoshihisa Naruse =

Japanese baseball player

Naruse Yoshihisa
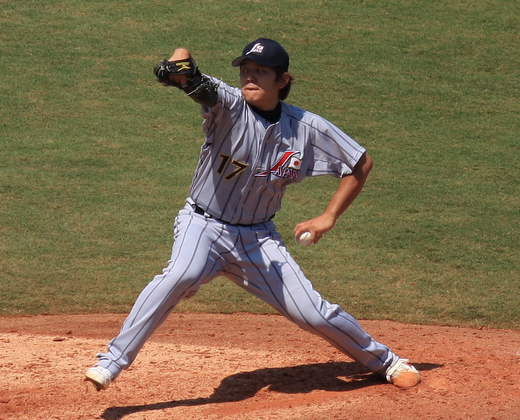
- Naruse pitching for Japan in the 2008 Summer Olympics.

Tochigi Golden Braves – No. 60
- Pitcher
- Born: October 13, 1985 (age 41); Tochigi, Japan
- Bats: Left Throws: Left

NPB debut
- May 17, 2006, for the Chiba Lotte Marines

NPB statistics (through 2016 season)
- Win–loss: 96-76
- Earned run average: 3.36
- Strikeouts: 1188
- Stats at Baseball Reference

Teams
- Chiba Lotte Marines (2004–2014); Tokyo Yakult Swallows (2015–2018); Orix Buffaloes (2019); Tochigi Golden Braves (2020–present)

Career highlights and awards
- 3× NPB All-Star (2007-2008, 2012); 1× NPB ERA Champion (2007); Japan Series champion (2010); 2010 PLCS Final Stage MVP
- Last updated on: 9 January 2019

Yoshihisa Naruse (Japanese:成瀬 善久, born, October 13, 1985 in Tochigi, Japan) is a Japanese baseball player. He is a pitcher for the Nippon Professional Baseball League team Orix Buffaloes. He made his debut in the 2006 season. In 2007, Naruse had his best season as a professional in his short career. All season long he was competing with Hokkaido Nippon-Ham Fighters superstar Yu Darvish for the Eiji Sawamura Award, the award for best pitcher in all of Japan. In 24 starts, Naruse was 16–1 with a 1.82 ERA, with 138 strikeouts and only 27 walks in 173 and 1/3 innings.

Darvish, by comparison, was 15–5 in 26 starts, also compiling a 1.82 ERA, but not only did he throw more complete games than Naruse (12 for Darvish, 6 for Naruse), but Darvish also threw more innings (207 and 2/3), but he struck out more batters, with 210 punch-outs.

The two ended up facing each other in the 2007 Pacific League Championship Series' deciding Game 5. Darvish triumphed over Naruse at Sapporo Dome, and the Fighters won Game 5 and the series 3–2, setting up a rematch of the 2006 Japan Series with the Chunichi Dragons. Naruse ultimately lost out to Darvish for the Sawamura Award in 2007.

Since that season, he has remained solid and was selected to the 2008 Japanese National Olympic baseball team, where he was one of the best players of what turned out to be a disappointing tournament for Team Japan, as the heavily favored Japanese failed to medal. Naruse gave up no earned runs over 12 innings, outperforming his more famous counterpart Darvish.

In 2007, Naruse's number was 60, but the next season he had it changed to 17.

Over his career, Naruse has a record of 63–40, with an ERA of 3.02.
