= 2006 World Baseball Classic =

Tournament between national baseball teams

Tournament details
- Countries: Japan; Puerto Rico; United States
- Dates: March 3–20, 2006
- Teams: 16

Final positions
- Champions: Japan (1st title)
- Runners-up: Cuba
- Third place: South Korea
- Fourth place: Dominican Republic

Tournament statistics
- Games played: 39
- Attendance: 737,112 (18,900 per game)

Awards
- MVP: (Japan) Daisuke Matsuzaka

The 2006 World Baseball Classic (WBC) was the inaugural tournament between national baseball teams that included players from Major League Baseball. It was held from March 3 to 20 in stadiums in or around Tokyo, Japan, and the American cities of San Juan, Puerto Rico; Lake Buena Vista, Florida; Phoenix, Arizona; Scottsdale, Arizona; Anaheim, California; and San Diego, California.

The first two rounds had a round-robin format, which led to two teams being eliminated on run difference tiebreakers: in the first round, Canada was eliminated despite its 2–1 record, due to a blowout loss to Mexico as well as failing to run up the score on South Africa; and in the second round, eventual champion Japan advanced despite its 1–2 record, due to a blowout win over Mexico and losing more narrowly to South Korea than did the United States. The higher-seeded teams generally advanced to the second round, including Puerto Rico and Venezuela, as well as the teams mentioned elsewhere in this summary.

Although South Korea defeated Japan twice in the earlier rounds, they were matched against each other again in the semifinals as the two teams emerging from the same second round pool, and Japan won that game to advance to the final against Cuba (which had defeated the Dominican Republic in the other semifinal). Japan defeated Cuba 10–6 to be crowned the first champion of the World Baseball Classic.

Daisuke Matsuzaka, a Nippon Professional Baseball veteran who was little-known outside Japan at the time, was crowned the Most Valuable Player of the tournament. The following year, he made his debut in the Major Leagues with the Boston Red Sox.

== Format ==
The first World Baseball Classic featured 16 teams in a round-robin. Each team played the other three teams in their pool once. Teams were ranked by winning percentage in the first round, with the top two teams in each pool advancing to the second round, where the teams from Pools A and B (in Pool 1) and the teams from Pools C and D (in Pool 2) competed against each other in another round-robin.

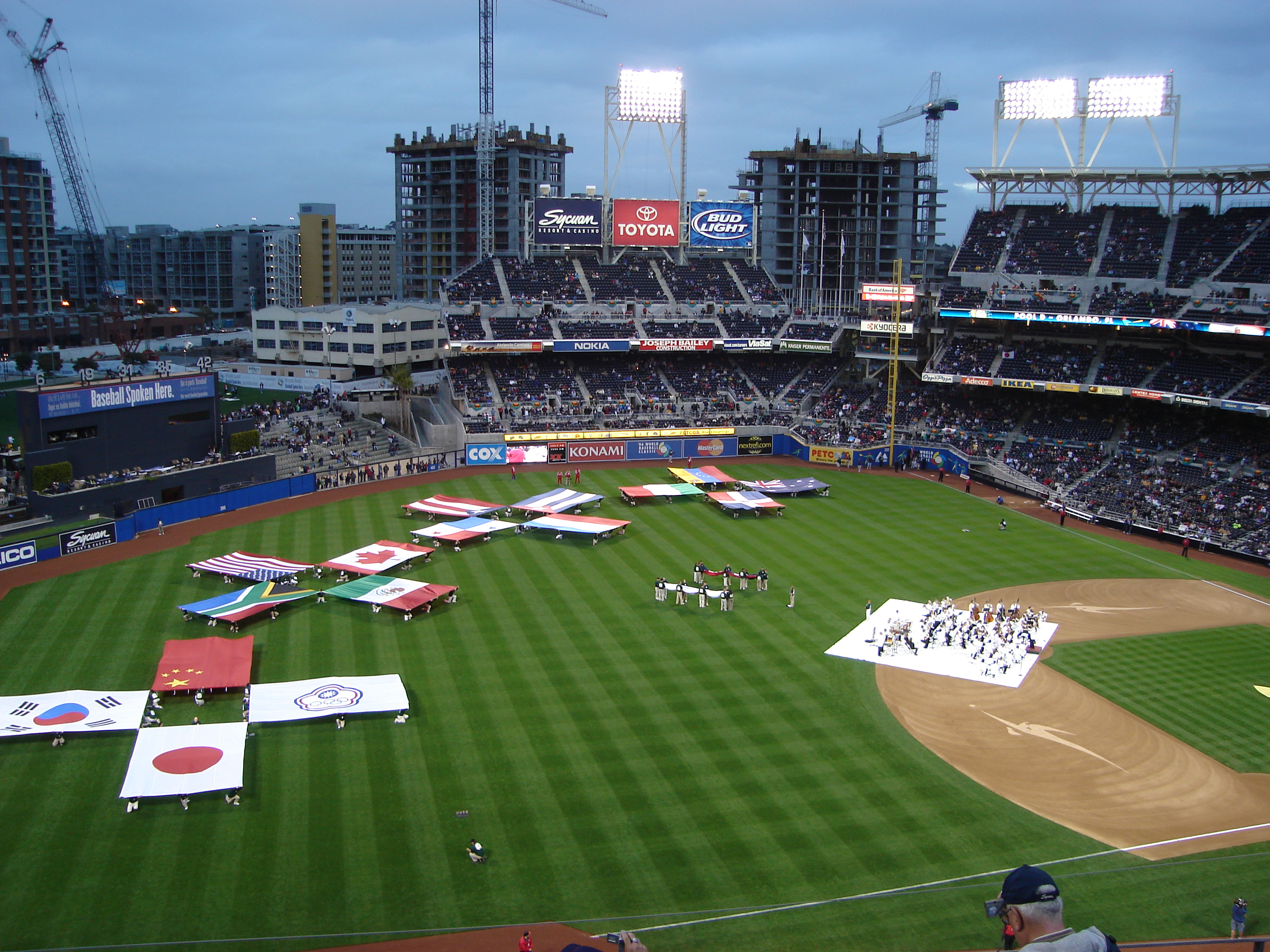
Flags of all the nations of the 2006 WBC at Petco Park

Teams were ranked by winning percentage in the second round, without regard to the results of the first round, with the top two teams from each pool entered a four-team single-elimination bracket, with the pool winners and runners-up from each pool facing each other in the semifinals. The winners of the semifinals then met to determine the World Baseball Classic Champions.

In the final, the team with the higher winning percentage of games in the tournament were to be the home team. If the teams competing in the final had identical winning percentages in the tournament, then World Baseball Classic Inc. (WBCI) would conduct a coin flip or draw to determine the home team.

In the first two rounds, ties were to be broken in the following order of priority:

1. The winner of head-to-head games between the tied teams;
2. The team allowing the fewest runs per nine innings (RA/9) in head-to-head games between the tied teams;
3. The team allowing the fewest earned runs per nine innings (ERA) in head-to-head games between the tied teams;
4. The team with the highest batting average (AVG) in head-to-head games between the tied teams;
5. Drawing of lots, conducted by World Baseball Classic, Inc. (WBCI).

== Rosters ==
Each participating national federation initially submitted a 45-man provisional roster. Final rosters of 28 players, which also must include a minimum of 13 pitchers and two catchers, were later submitted. If a player on the submitted roster was unable to play, usually due to injury, he could be substituted at any time before the start of the tournament.

== Venues ==
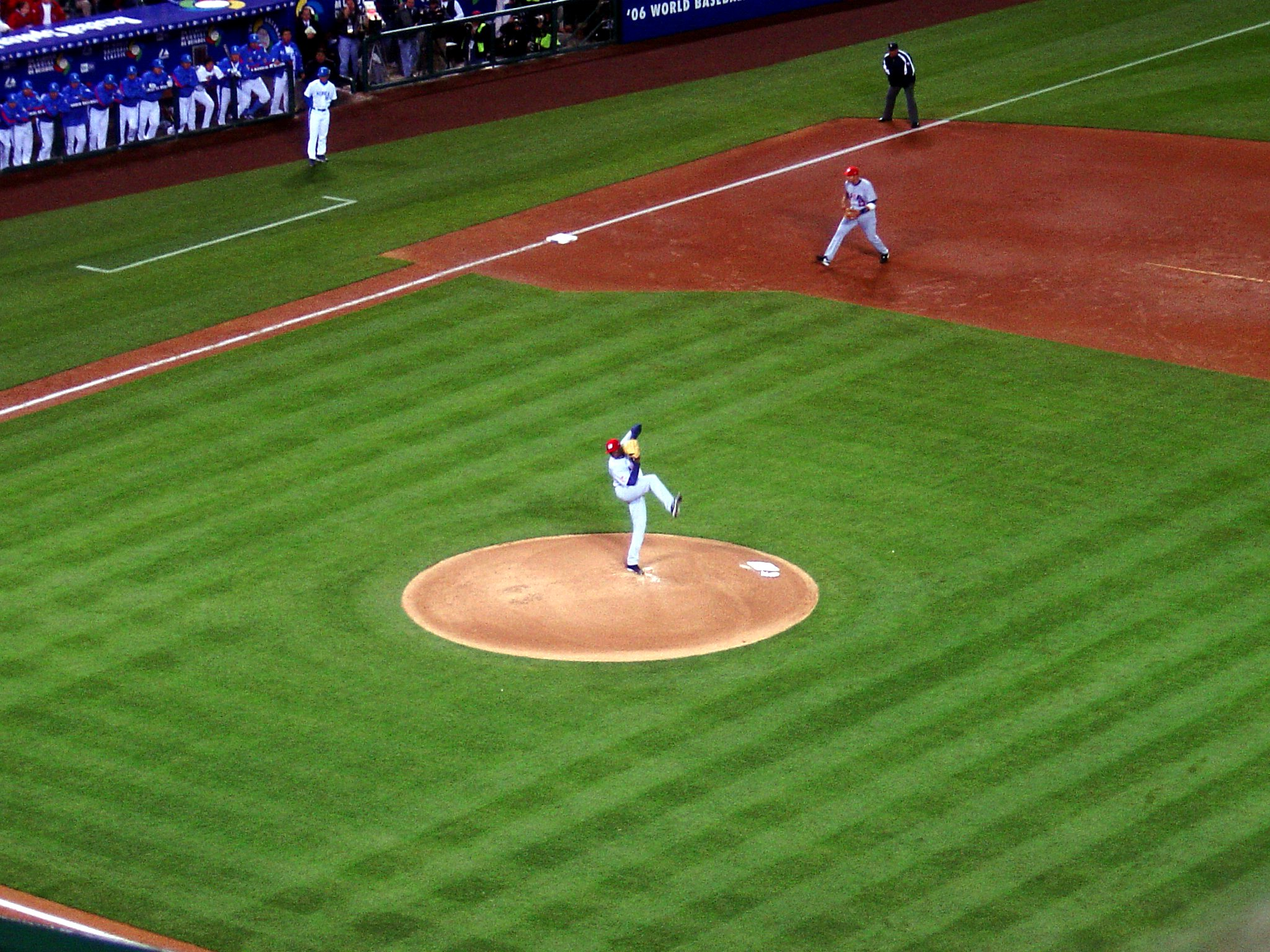
A game on March 13, 2006, Angel Stadium, Anaheim, USA

Seven stadiums were used during the tournament:

Pool A	Pool B	Pool B	Pool C & 2
Tokyo, Japan	Phoenix, United States	Scottsdale, United States	San Juan, Puerto Rico
Tokyo Dome	Chase Field	Scottsdale Stadium	Hiram Bithorn Stadium
Capacity: 42,000	Capacity: 49,033	Capacity: 8,500	Capacity: 18,264

Pool D	Pool 1	Championship
Lake Buena Vista, United States	Anaheim, United States	San Diego, United States
Champion Stadium at Disney's Wide World of Sports	Angel Stadium of Anaheim	Petco Park
Capacity: 9,500	Capacity: 45,037	Capacity: 42,445

== Pools composition ==
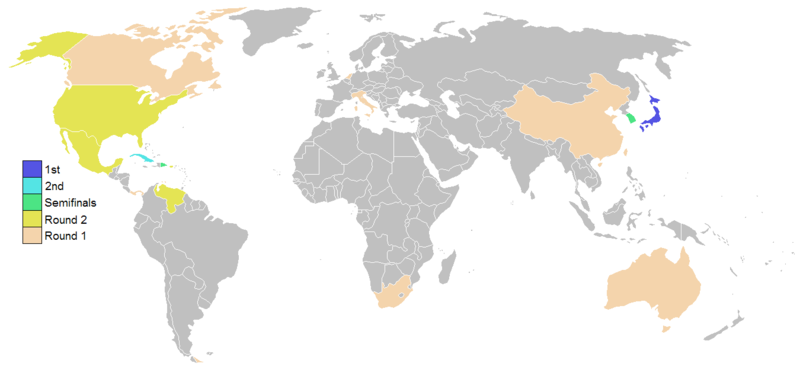
Countries that participated

The teams selected for the inaugural World Baseball Classic were chosen because they were judged to be the "best baseball-playing nations in the world and provide global representation for the event." There was no official qualifying competition. In addition, there were no world rankings by the International Baseball Federation to determine the strength of the countries.

Pool A	Pool B	Pool C	Pool D
China	Canada	Cuba	Australia
Chinese Taipei	Mexico	Netherlands	Dominican Republic
Japan	South Africa	Panama	Italy
South Korea	United States	Puerto Rico	Venezuela

== First round ==
=== Pool A ===
Pos	Team	Pld	W	L	RF	RA	RD	PCT	GB	Qualification
1	South Korea	3	3	0	15	3	+12	1.000	—	Advance to second round
2	Japan (H)	3	2	1	34	8	+26	.667	1	Advance to second round
3	Chinese Taipei	3	1	2	15	19	−4	.333	2	
4	China	3	0	3	6	40	−34	.000	3	

(H) Hosts

Date	Local time	Road team	Score	Home team	Inn.	Venue	Game duration	Attendance	Boxscore
Mar 3, 2006	11:30	South Korea	2–0	Chinese Taipei		Tokyo Dome	3:19	5,193	Boxscore
Mar 3, 2006	18:30	Japan	18–2	China	8	Tokyo Dome	3:04	15,869	Boxscore
Mar 4, 2006	11:00	China	1–10	South Korea		Tokyo Dome	2:52	3,925	Boxscore
Mar 4, 2006	18:00	Japan	14–3	Chinese Taipei	7	Tokyo Dome	3:10	31,047	Boxscore
Mar 5, 2006	11:00	Chinese Taipei	12–3	China		Tokyo Dome	3:31	4,577	Boxscore
Mar 5, 2006	18:00	South Korea	3–2	Japan		Tokyo Dome	3:02	40,353	Boxscore

=== Pool B ===
Pos	Team	Pld	W	L	RF	RA	RD	PCT	GB	Qualification
1	Mexico	3	2	1	19	7	+12	.667 (Note: Mexico 1.59 RA/9, United States 4.00 RA/9, Canada 7.50 RA/9.)	—	Advance to second round
2	United States (H)	3	2	1	25	8	+17	.667	—	Advance to second round
3	Canada	3	2	1	20	23	−3	.667	—	
4	South Africa	3	0	3	12	38	−26	.000	2	

(H) Hosts
Notes:

Date	Local time	Road team	Score	Home team	Inn.	Venue	Game duration	Attendance	Boxscore
Mar 7, 2006	14:00	Mexico	0–2	United States		Chase Field	2:06	32,727	Boxscore
Mar 7, 2006	19:00	Canada	11–8	South Africa		Scottsdale Stadium	3:38	5,829	Boxscore
Mar 8, 2006	14:00	Canada	8–6	United States		Chase Field	3:02	16,993	Boxscore
Mar 8, 2006	19:00	South Africa	4–10	Mexico		Scottsdale Stadium	3:17	7,937	Boxscore
Mar 9, 2006	18:00	Mexico	9–1	Canada		Chase Field	3:00	15,744	Boxscore
Mar 10, 2006	13:00	United States	17–0	South Africa	5	Scottsdale Stadium	1:47	11,975	Boxscore

=== Pool C ===
Pos	Team	Pld	W	L	RF	RA	RD	PCT	GB	Qualification
1	Puerto Rico (H)	3	3	0	22	6	+16	1.000	—	Advance to second round
2	Cuba	3	2	1	21	20	+1	.667	1	Advance to second round
3	Netherlands	3	1	2	15	19	−4	.333	2	
4	Panama	3	0	3	7	20	−13	.000	3	

(H) Hosts

Date	Local time	Road team	Score	Home team	Inn.	Venue	Game duration	Attendance	Boxscore
Mar 7, 2006	20:00	Panama	1–2	Puerto Rico		Hiram Bithorn Stadium	2:47	19,043	Boxscore
Mar 8, 2006	14:00	Cuba	8–6	Panama	11	Hiram Bithorn Stadium	4:11	6,129	Boxscore
Mar 8, 2006	20:30	Puerto Rico	8–3	Netherlands		Hiram Bithorn Stadium	3:29	15,570	Boxscore
Mar 9, 2006	20:00	Cuba	11–2	Netherlands		Hiram Bithorn Stadium	3:19	7,657	Boxscore
Mar 10, 2006	14:00	Netherlands	10–0	Panama	7	Hiram Bithorn Stadium	2:18	6,337	Boxscore
Mar 10, 2006	20:30	Puerto Rico	12–2	Cuba	7	Hiram Bithorn Stadium	3:01	19,736	Boxscore

=== Pool D ===
Pos	Team	Pld	W	L	RF	RA	RD	PCT	GB	Qualification
1	Dominican Republic	3	3	0	25	12	+13	1.000	—	Advance to second round
2	Venezuela	3	2	1	13	11	+2	.667	1	Advance to second round
3	Italy	3	1	2	13	14	−1	.333	2	
4	Australia	3	0	3	4	18	−14	.000	3	

Date	Local time	Road team	Score	Home team	Inn.	Venue	Game duration	Attendance	Boxscore
Mar 7, 2006	13:00	Dominican Republic	11–5	Venezuela		Cracker Jack Stadium	3:16	10,645	Boxscore
Mar 7, 2006	20:00	Australia	0–10	Italy	7	Cracker Jack Stadium	2:16	8,099	Boxscore
Mar 8, 2006	19:00	Italy	0–6	Venezuela		Cracker Jack Stadium	2:48	10,101	Boxscore
Mar 9, 2006	13:00	Italy	3–8	Dominican Republic		Cracker Jack Stadium	2:39	9,949	Boxscore
Mar 9, 2006	20:00	Venezuela	2–0	Australia		Cracker Jack Stadium	2:45	10,111	Boxscore
Mar 10, 2006	19:00	Australia	4–6	Dominican Republic		Cracker Jack Stadium	2:52	11,083	Boxscore

== Second round ==
=== Pool 1 ===
Pos	Team	Pld	W	L	RF	RA	RD	PCT	GB	Qualification
1	South Korea	3	3	0	11	5	+6	1.000	—	Advance to championship round
2	Japan	3	1	2	10	7	+3	.333 (Note: Japan 2.55 RA/9, United States 2.65 RA/9, Mexico 3.50 RA/9)	2	Advance to championship round
3	United States (H)	3	1	2	8	12	−4	.333	2	
4	Mexico	3	1	2	4	9	−5	.333	2	

(H) Hosts
Notes:

Date	Local time	Road team	Score	Home team	Inn.	Venue	Game duration	Attendance	Boxscore
Mar 12, 2006	13:00	Japan	3–4	United States		Angel Stadium of Anaheim	3:09	32,896	Boxscore
Mar 12, 2006	20:00	Mexico	1–2	South Korea		Angel Stadium of Anaheim	2:57	42,979	Boxscore
Mar 13, 2006	19:00	United States	3–7	South Korea		Angel Stadium of Anaheim	3:27	21,288	Boxscore
Mar 14, 2006	16:00	Japan	6–1	Mexico		Angel Stadium of Anaheim	2:36	16,591	Boxscore
Mar 15, 2006	19:00	South Korea	2–1	Japan		Angel Stadium of Anaheim	2:44	39,679	Boxscore
Mar 16, 2006	16:30	United States	1–2	Mexico		Angel Stadium of Anaheim	2:50	38,284	Boxscore

=== Pool 2 ===
Pos	Team	Pld	W	L	RF	RA	RD	PCT	GB	Qualification
1	Dominican Republic	3	2	1	10	11	−1	.667 (Note: Dominican Republic defeated Cuba 7–3.)	—	Advance to championship round
2	Cuba	3	2	1	14	12	+2	.667	—	Advance to championship round
3	Venezuela	3	1	2	9	9	0	.333 (Note: Venezuela defeated Puerto Rico 6–0.)	1	
4	Puerto Rico (H)	3	1	2	10	11	−1	.333	1	

(H) Hosts
Notes:

Date	Local time	Road team	Score	Home team	Inn.	Venue	Game duration	Attendance	Boxscore
Mar 12, 2006	14:00	Cuba	7–2	Venezuela		Hiram Bithorn Stadium	2:56	13,697	Boxscore
Mar 12, 2006	21:00	Puerto Rico	7–1	Dominican Republic		Hiram Bithorn Stadium	3:01	19,692	Boxscore
Mar 13, 2006	14:00	Dominican Republic	7–3	Cuba		Hiram Bithorn Stadium	3:48	6,594	Boxscore
Mar 13, 2006	20:00	Venezuela	6–0	Puerto Rico		Hiram Bithorn Stadium	3:09	19,400	Boxscore
Mar 14, 2006	20:00	Venezuela	1–2	Dominican Republic		Hiram Bithorn Stadium	3:02	13,007	Boxscore
Mar 15, 2006	20:00	Cuba	4–3	Puerto Rico		Hiram Bithorn Stadium	3:56	19,773	Boxscore

== Championship round ==
Semifinals
2R	Cuba	3
2W	Dominican Republic	1
1R	Japan	6
1W	South Korea	0

Final
SF1W	Cuba	6
SF2W	Japan	10

=== Semifinals ===
Date	Local time	Road team	Score	Home team	Inn.	Venue	Game duration	Attendance	Boxscore
Mar 18, 2006	12:00	Cuba	3–1	Dominican Republic		Petco Park	3:42	41,268	Boxscore
Mar 18, 2006	19:00	Japan	6–0	South Korea		Petco Park	2:40	42,639	Boxscore

==== Semifinal 1 – Cuba 3, Dominican Republic 1 ====
March 18 12:00 at Petco Park
Team	1	2	3	4	5	6	7	8	9	R	H	E
Cuba	0	0	0	0	0	0	3	0	0	3	12	3
Dominican Republic	0	0	0	0	0	1	0	0	0	1	8	1
WP: Pedro Luis Lazo (1–0) LP: Odalis Pérez (2–1); Attendance: 41,268 (97.2%); Umpires: HP − Bob Davidson, 1B − Tom Hallion, 2B − Chris Guccione, 3B − Neil Poulton, LF − Carlos Rey, RF − Ed Hickox; Boxscore

==== Semifinal 2 – Japan 6, South Korea 0 ====
March 18 19:00 at Petco Park
Team	1	2	3	4	5	6	7	8	9	R	H	E
Japan	0	0	0	0	0	0	5	1	0	6	11	0
South Korea	0	0	0	0	0	0	0	0	0	0	4	0
WP: Koji Uehara (2–0) LP: Byung-doo Jun (0–1); Home runs: JPN: Kosuke Fukudome (1), Hitoshi Tamura (1); KOR: None; Attendance: 42,639 (100.5%); Umpires: HP − Ed Hickox, 1B − Chris Guccione, 2B − Bob Davidson, 3B − Carlos Rey, LF − Tom Hallion, RF − Neil Poulton; Boxscore

=== Final ===
Date	Local time	Road team	Score	Home team	Inn.	Venue	Game duration	Attendance	Boxscore
Mar 20, 2006	18:00	Japan	10–6	Cuba		Petco Park	3:40	42,696	Boxscore

== Final standings ==
Organizer WBCI has no interest in the final standings and did not compute. So, it was calculated by IBAF.

In the final standings, ties were to be broken in the following order of priority:

1. The team allowing the fewest runs per nine innings (RA/9) in all games;
2. The team allowing the fewest earned runs per nine innings (ERA) in all games;
3. The team with the highest batting average (AVG) in all games;

Rk	Team	W	L	Tiebreaker
1	Japan	5	3	–
Lost in Final
2	Cuba	5	3	–
Lost in Semifinals
3	South Korea	6	1	–
4	Dominican Republic	5	2	–
Eliminated in Second Round
5	Puerto Rico	4	2	–
6	Mexico	3	3	2.77 RA/9
7	Venezuela	3	3	3.40 RA/9
8	United States	3	3	3.75 RA/9
Eliminated in First Round
9	Canada	2	1	–
10	Italy	1	2	5.48 RA/9
11	Netherlands	1	2	6.84 RA/9, 6.48 ERA
12	Chinese Taipei	1	2	6.84 RA/9, 6.84 ERA
13	Australia	0	3	6.85 RA/9
14	Panama	0	3	6.92 RA/9
15	China	0	3	14.40 RA/9
16	South Africa	0	3	15.55 RA/9

2006 World Baseball Classic champions

Japan
First title

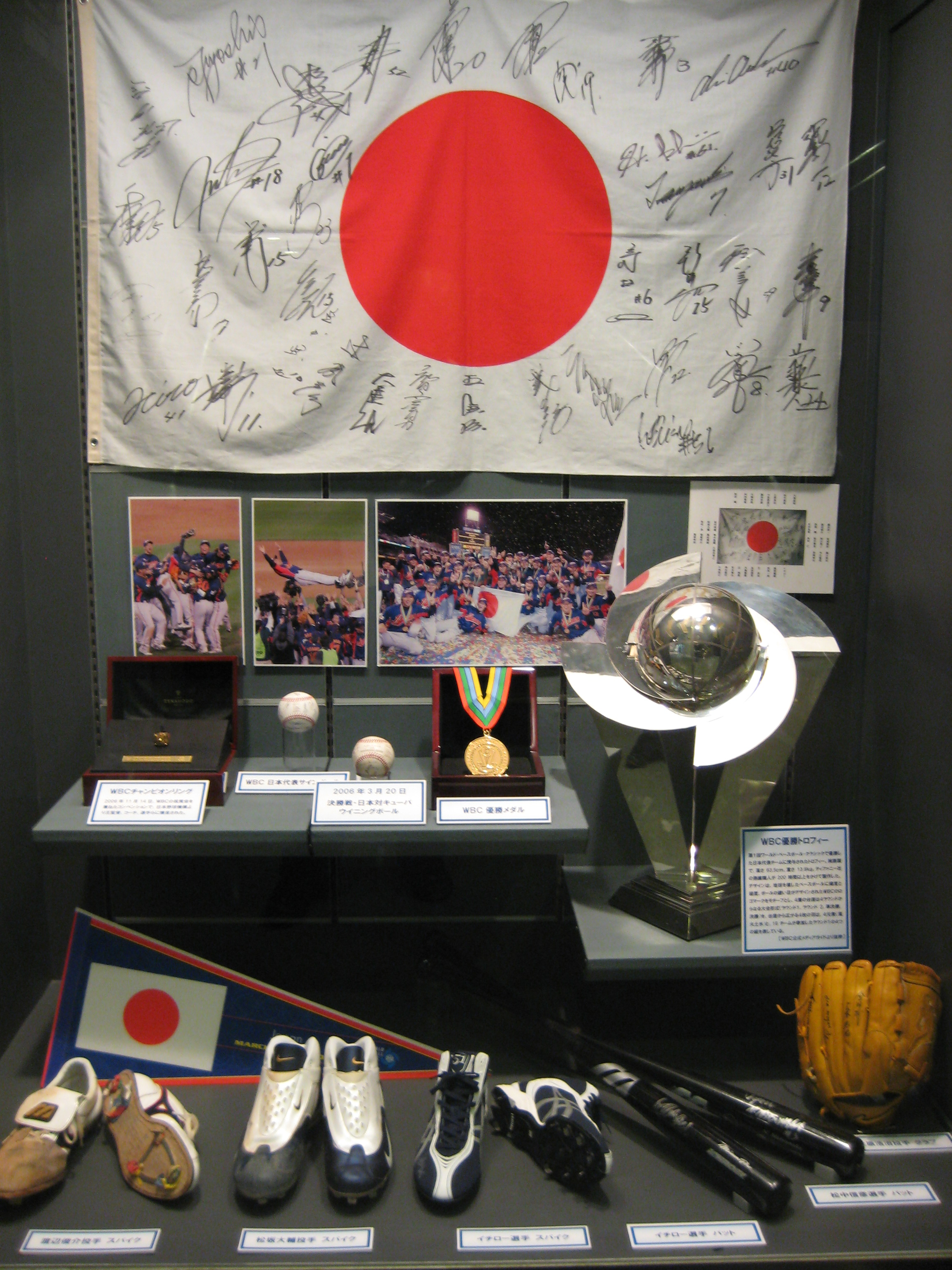
Championship Trophy

== Attendance ==
737,112 (avg. 18,900; pct. 67.1%)

=== First round ===
326,629 (avg. 13,610; pct. 55.3%)

- Pool A – 100,964 (avg. 16,827; pct. 40.1%)
- Pool B – 91,205 (avg. 15,201; pct. 52.8%)
  - Chase Field – 65,464 (avg. 21,821; pct. 44.5%)
  - Scottsdale Stadium – 25,741 (avg. 8,580; pct. 100.9%)
- Pool C – 74,472 (avg. 12,412; pct. 68.0%)
- Pool D – 59,988 (avg. 9,998; pct. 105.2%)

=== Second round ===
283,880 (avg. 23,657; pct. 74.7%)

- Pool 1 – 191,717 (avg. 31,953; pct. 70.9%)
- Pool 2 – 92,163 (avg. 15,361; pct. 84.1%)

=== Championship round ===
126,603 (avg. 42,201; pct. 99.4%)

- Semifinals – 83,907 (avg. 41,954; pct. 98.8%)
- Final – 42,696 (avg. 42,696; pct. 100.6%)

== 2006 All-World Baseball Classic team ==
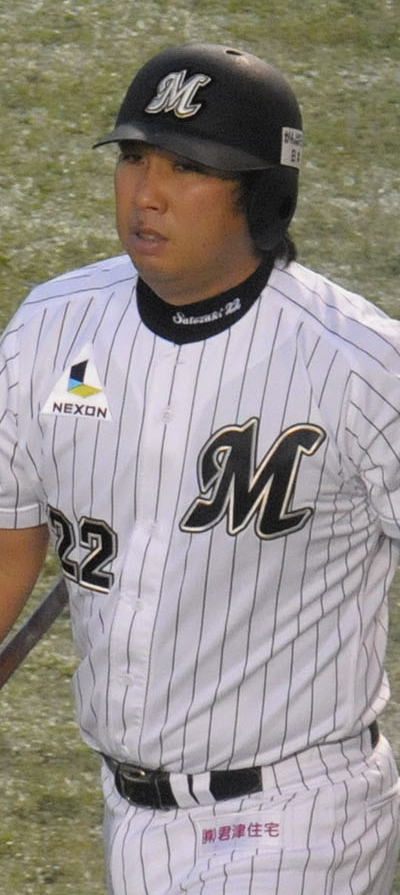
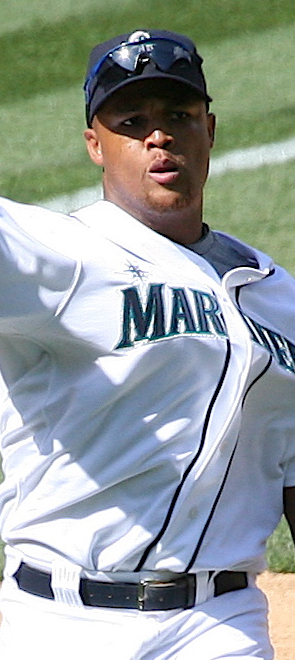
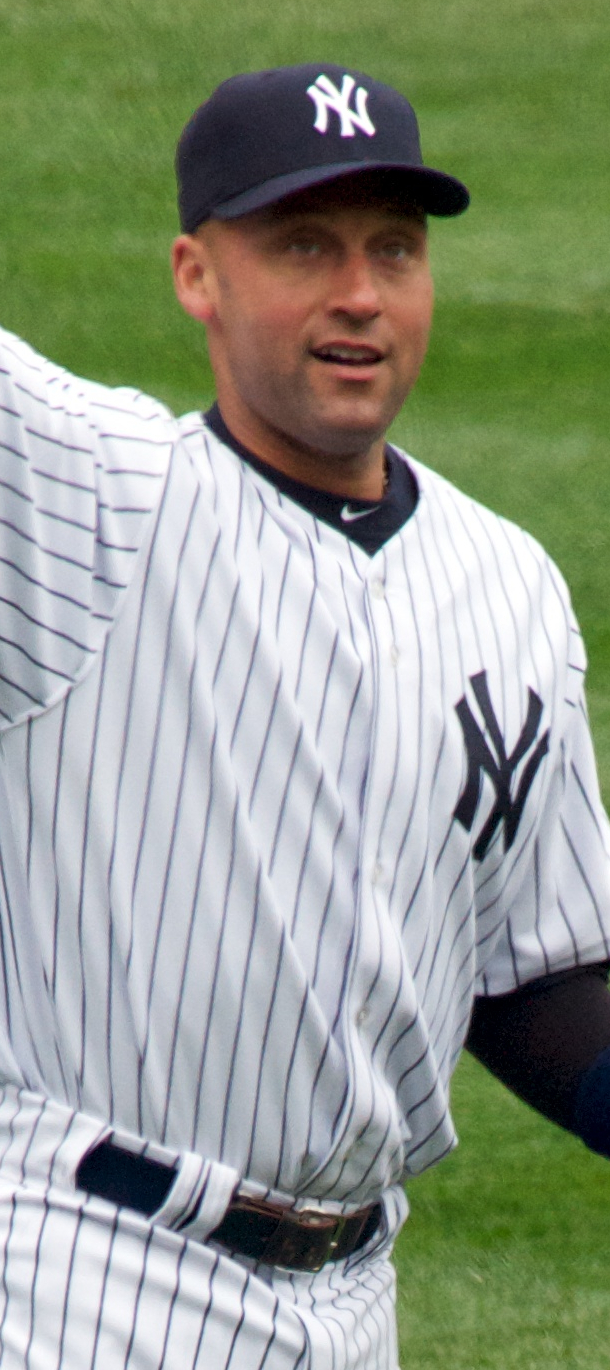
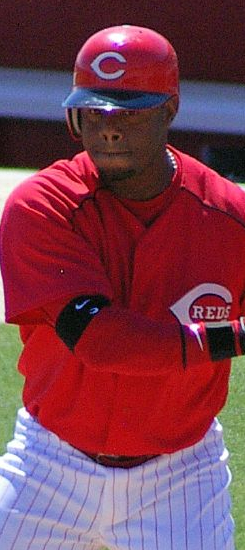
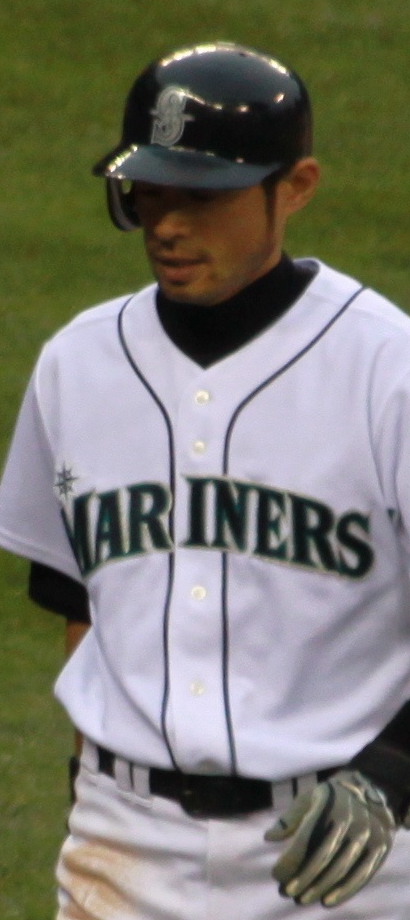
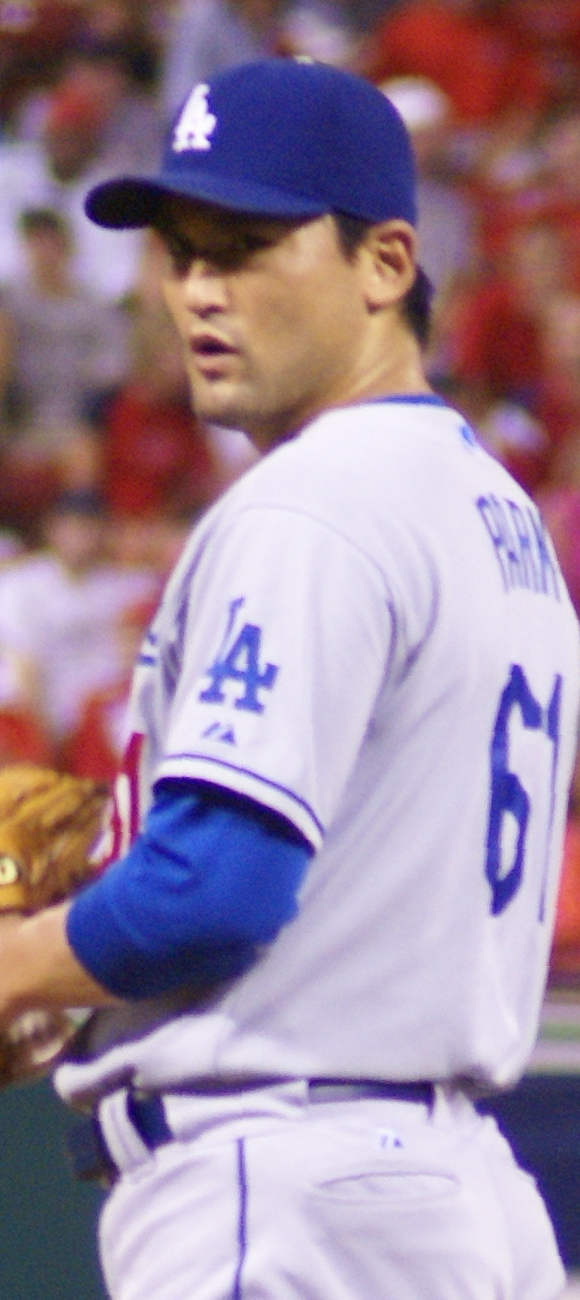
Players named to the All-WBC Team (from left to right);
Catcher – Tomoya Satozaki of Japan
Third baseman – Adrián Beltré of the Dominican Republic
Shortstop – Derek Jeter of the United States
Outfielder – Ken Griffey Jr. of the United States
Outfielder – Ichiro Suzuki of Japan
Pitcher – Chan Ho Park of South Korea

Note: The tournament Most Valuable Player was Daisuke Matsuzaka.

Position	Player
C	(Japan) Tomoya Satozaki
1B	(South Korea) Seung-yuop Lee
2B	(Cuba) Yulieski Gourriel
3B	(Dominican Republic) Adrián Beltré
SS	(United States) Derek Jeter
OF	(United States) Ken Griffey Jr.
OF	(South Korea) Jong-beom Lee
OF	(Japan) Ichiro Suzuki
DH	(Cuba) Yoandy Garlobo
P	(Cuba) Yadel Martí
P	(Japan) Daisuke Matsuzaka
P	(South Korea) Chan Ho Park

== Statistics leaders ==
=== Batting ===
Statistic	Name	Total/Avg
Batting average*	(Canada) Adam Stern	.667
Hits	(Japan) Nobuhiko Matsunaka	13
Runs	(Japan) Nobuhiko Matsunaka	11
Home runs	(South Korea) Seung-yuop Lee	5
RBI	(United States) Ken Griffey Jr. (South Korea) Seung-yuop Lee	10
Walks	(Dominican Republic) David Ortiz	8
Strikeouts	(Japan) Hitoshi Tamura	9
Stolen bases	(Japan) Tsuyoshi Nishioka	5
On-base percentage*	(Canada) Adam Stern	.727
Slugging percentage*	(Canada) Adam Stern	1.333
OPS*	(Canada) Adam Stern	2.061

* Minimum 2.7 plate appearances per game

=== Pitching ===
Statistic	Name	Total/Avg
Wins	(Japan) Daisuke Matsuzaka	3
Losses	(Mexico) Rodrigo López (Venezuela) Johan Santana (United States) Dontrelle Willis	2
Saves	(South Korea) Chan Ho Park	3
Innings pitched	(Japan) Koji Uehara	17.0
Hits allowed	(Japan) Koji Uehara	17
Runs allowed	(South Africa) Carl Michaels	10
Earned runs allowed	(South Africa) Carl Michaels	10
ERA*	(Cuba) Yadel Martí	0.00**
Walks	(United States) Dontrelle Willis	6
Strikeouts	(Japan) Koji Uehara	16
WHIP*	(Netherlands) Shairon Martis	0.14

* Minimum 0.8 innings pitched per game
** Martí is tied with 10 others with a 0.00 ERA but he pitched the most innings with 12.2

== Additional rules ==
There were several rule changes from normal major league play. Pitchers were held to a pitch count of 65 in the first round, 80 in the second round, and 95 in the championship round. (Netherlands pitcher Shairon Martis used exactly 65 pitches to throw a seven inning no-hitter of the tournament, a 10–0 win over Panama stopped by the mercy rule [see below].) If a pitcher reached his maximum pitch count in the middle of an at-bat, he could continue to pitch to that batter, but was required to be replaced once that at-bat ended. A 30–pitch outing needed to be followed by one day off, and a 50–pitch outing by four days off. No one would be allowed to pitch on three consecutive days.

A mercy rule came into effect when one team led by either fifteen runs after five innings, or ten runs after seven innings in the first two rounds. In addition, ties could be called after fourteen innings of play.

The designated hitter rule was in place for all games.

== Controversies ==
Format

South Korea completed the first two rounds undefeated (6–0) but was still forced to play Japan, a team it had beaten twice, in the semifinal round. South Korea lost and thus placed 3rd, even though South Korea's final standings were 6–1, with the most wins. Other international sporting competitions, such as the FIFA World Cup, are formatted so teams cannot play each other three times but can only face each other twice at most – in round robin group play and again for the championship or 3rd-place match. In addition, the regional grouping of teams was questioned because the groups were perceived as unevenly distributed, and the four-team pool system and subsequent three-way tiebreakers were widely seen as awkward.

Umpires

Tournament organizers could not reach an agreement with the MLB umpires' union and so the Classic was overseen by umpires from the minor leagues.

South Korea

When South Korea beat Japan, they planted South Korean national flags into a pitcher's mound at Angels Stadium at Anaheim.

Chinese Taipei

The Chinese Taipei team was originally listed as "Taiwan" and bearing the ROC national flag, but following pressure from the People's Republic of China the listing was later changed to Chinese Taipei with the Chinese Taipei Olympic flag.

Drug testing

The World Anti-Doping Agency criticized IBAF's drug testing program and threatened to withdraw sanction of the event under claims the MLB was attempting to "brush the issue under the carpet." South Korean pitcher Myung-hwan Park tested positive for a banned substance during the event, and he was subsequently kicked out of the WBC.. Venezuelan pitcher Freddy García tested positive for marijuana.

Player participation

Numerous MLB players pulled out of the competition for various reasons, such as Barry Bonds, Vladimir Guerrero, and Manny Ramírez, among others. Cuba in particular barred players such as Orlando Hernández, his half-brother Liván Hernández, and José Contreras from its team as Cubans who had previously defected.

== Success of tournament ==
Many members of the United States press were skeptical of the Classic since its inception. The event proved to be quite popular, however, providing many memorable moments including a first-round game between Venezuela and the Dominican Republic. Attendance was higher than expected at several sites, including the 18,000-seat Hiram Bithorn Stadium in San Juan, which was sold out for every Puerto Rico game in the first two rounds. In addition, 4,000 media credentials were issued – more than the World Series – which bodes well for the stated goal of internationalizing the sport. Sports Illustrated writer Tom Verducci reported that "more merchandise was sold in the first round than organizers projected for the entire 17-day event." He also reported that, at one point, jerseys for the Venezuelan team were selling at the rate of one every six seconds.

The U.S. television ratings on ESPN were stronger than initially expected, drawing more than one million television sets for some games, more than almost any other ESPN program in the month of March. This occurred despite less than stellar airing times for the games. Most were not aired live but taped, and sometimes with innings cut, as the WBC was organized well after ESPN had committed to much of its programming.

Outside the U.S. TV ratings were very high. In Latin America, a first-round game between the United States and Mexico, was the third-most-watched game in the history of ESPN Dos, one of the three Spanish-language channels of ESPN in Latin America.

== The allocation of earnings ==
The total earnings of the World Baseball Classic is divided into net profit (53%) and prize money (47%).

=== Net profit (53%) ===
- World Baseball Classic Inc.: 17.5%
- Baseball Players Union: 17.5%
- Japanese Baseball Organization: 7%
- Korea Baseball Organization: 5%
- International Baseball Federation: 5%
- Miscellaneous expenses: 1%

=== Prize money (47%) ===
- Japan (champions): 10%
- Cuba (runners-up): 7%
- South Korea and Dominican Republic (semifinalists): 5% each
- The four teams that lost out in Round 2: 3% each
- The eight teams that lost out in Round 1: 1% each
