= Hiroyuki Kobayashi (baseball) =

Japanese baseball player

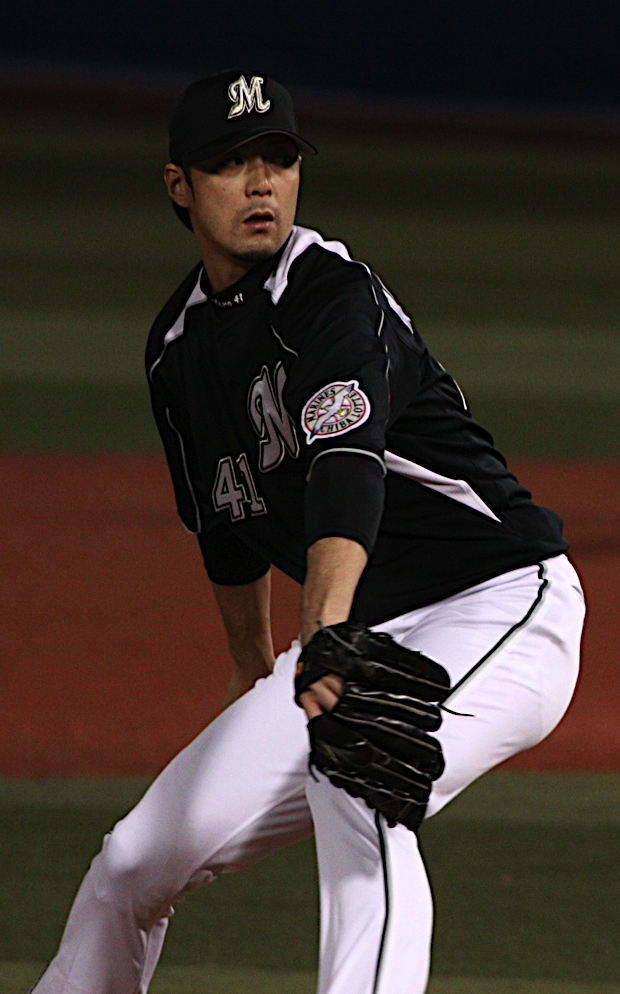
- Kobayashi during his tenure with the Chiba Lotte Marines in 2010

Chiba Lotte Marines – No. 71
- Pitcher/Manager
- Born: June 4, 1978 (age 47); Sōka, Saitama, Japan
- Bats: Right Throws: Right

NPB debut
- July 4, 1998, for the Chiba Lotte Marines

NPB statistics
- Win–loss: 75–74
- Saves: 29
- Earned run average: 3.57
- Strikeouts: 1135
- Stats at Baseball Reference

Teams
- As player: Chiba Lotte Marines (1998–2010); Hanshin Tigers (2011–2012); Saitama Seibu Lions (2014); As manager: Musashi Heat Bears (2015–2017); Chiba Lotte Marines (2026–present)
Medals
Representing Japan
Men's baseball
World Baseball Classic
Gold medal – first place	2006 San Diego	Team

Hiroyuki Kobayashi (小林 宏之, 小林宏, Kobayashi Hiroyuki, Kobayashi-Hiro; born June 4, 1978) is a Japanese professional baseball right-handed pitcher. He played in the 2006 World Baseball Classic for Japan.

As a relief pitcher Kobayashi throws a fastball that sits in 87-91 mph (tops out at 93 mph), silder, change-up, and an effective forkball as his out pitch.

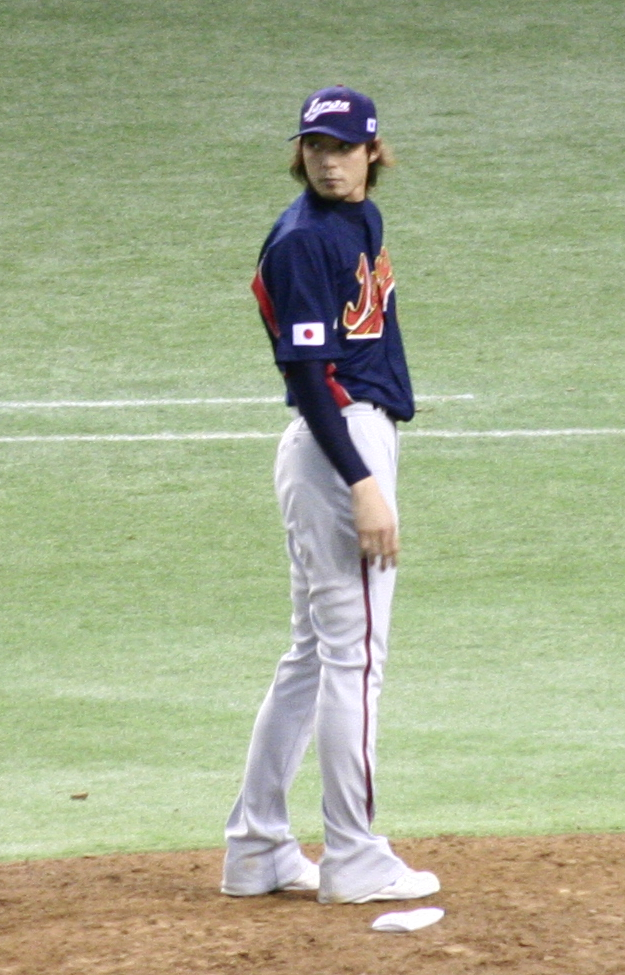
Kobayashi pitched for Japan in the 2006 World Baseball Classic.
