= Bill Murphy (pitcher) =

American baseball player (born 1981)

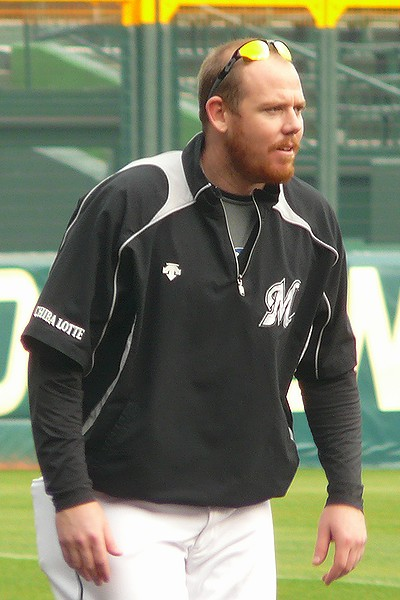
- Murphy with the Chiba Lotte Marines
- Pitcher
- Born: May 9, 1981 (age 45); Anaheim, California, U.S.
- Batted: Left Threw: Left

Professional debut
- MLB: September 3, 2007, for the Arizona Diamondbacks
- NPB: March 26, 2010, for the Chiba Lotte Marines
- CPBL: August 30, 2014, for the Uni-President 7-Eleven Lions

Last appearance
- MLB: May 13, 2009, for the Toronto Blue Jays
- NPB: September 10, 2011, for the Chiba Lotte Marines
- CPBL: September 30, 2014, for the Uni-President 7-Eleven Lions

MLB statistics
- Win–loss record: 0–0
- Earned run average: 4.08
- Strikeouts: 8

NPB statistics
- Win–loss record: 14–11
- Earned run average: 3.81
- Strikeouts: 158

CPBL statistics
- Win–loss record: 1–3
- Earned run average: 3.38
- Strikeouts: 22
- Stats at Baseball Reference

Teams
- Arizona Diamondbacks (2007); Toronto Blue Jays (2009); Chiba Lotte Marines (2010–2011); Uni-President 7-Eleven Lions (2014)

Career highlights and awards
- Japan Series champion (2010)

William R. W. Murphy (born May 9, 1981) is an American professional baseball left-handed pitcher. He played in Major League Baseball (MLB) for the Arizona Diamondbacks and Toronto Blue Jays, and in Nippon Professional Baseball (NPB) for the Chiba Lotte Marines being one of the most highly known pitchers in Japan during the 2010 season.

Murphy and Yu Darvish were both the top leading Aces in Japan for the 2010 season, yet Murphy being the dominant force for his team, the Chiba Lotte Marines to win the 2010 Japan Series. He has also played in the Chinese Professional Baseball League (CPBL) for the Uni-President 7-Eleven Lions. Bill Murphy is the only player in Major League Baseball history to be traded three times in less than a 24-hour time period, in the Paul Lo Duca, Brad Penny, Hee-seop Choi, Juan Encarnacion and Guillermo Mota trade.

Murphy attended Arlington High School in Riverside, California. After graduating from high school, Murphy was granted a baseball scholarship to CSU Northridge. Before attending college, he was drafted by the San Francisco Giants in the 24th round (738th overall) in the 1999 Major League Baseball draft, but did not sign with them.

After attending California State University, Northridge for three years, Murphy was selected as the 98th overall pick in the third-round of the 2002 famous Moneyball draft.

== Career ==
=== Oakland Athletics ===
He was drafted again by the Oakland Athletics in the third round (98th overall) of the 2002 "Moneyball" draft. He spent two seasons in the Athletics organization, pitching for the Vancouver Canadians (2002), Kane County Cougars (2003) and Midland RockHounds (2003). On June 10, 2003, Bill pitched a no-hitter for the Kane County Cougars.

=== Florida Marlins ===
On December 23, 2003, he was sent to the Florida Marlins as the player to be named later that had sent Mark Redman to the Athletics and Mike Neu to the Marlins in a trade on December 16, 2003.

Murphy began the 2004 season with the Carolina Mudcats, the Marlins Double-A affiliate. In 20 starts with the Mudcats, he was 6–4 with a 4.08 ERA.

=== Arizona Diamondbacks ===
On July 30, 2004, Murphy was traded along with Hee-Seop Choi and Brad Penny to the Los Angeles Dodgers for Paul Lo Duca, Juan Encarnación, and Guillermo Mota. The next day, on July 31, 2004, he was traded once again, this time to the Arizona Diamondbacks along with Koyie Hill and Reggie Abercrombie for Steve Finley and Brent Mayne. He finished the season with the Double-A El Paso Diablos.

Murphy spent the whole 2005 season with the Triple-A Tucson Sidewinders but performed poorly as he had a 5.65 ERA in 23 games (21 starts). He began the 2006 season back in Double-A with the Tennessee Smokies. He was later promoted back up to Triple-A.

In 2007, Murphy once again began the year in Triple-A. He started nine games in which he went 2–2 with a 4.05 ERA. He was mainly a relief pitcher however as he pitched 45 games out of the bullpen. He went 1–1 with a 3.35 ERA with 1 save out of the bullpen. His good performance earned him a September 1 call-up by the big league club.

He made his Major League debut against the San Diego Padres on September 3, working 1.2 innings in relief and allowing three earned runs on 3 hits and 3 walks. In 10 games for the Diamondbacks in 2007, he had a 5.68 ERA.

In 2008, during spring training, the Diamondbacks designated Murphy for assignment and placed him on waivers.

=== Toronto Blue Jays ===
The Toronto Blue Jays claimed Murphy off waivers on March 17.

Murphy did not make the 25-man Toronto 2009 roster out of spring training, and was assigned to Triple-A Las Vegas 51s. On April 14, 2009, Murphy was called up to the Toronto Blue Jays to replace the injured Jesse Litsch. Murphy made his Toronto debut on April 15 in relief, in a win over the Minnesota Twins. On November 3, 2009, he was designated for assignment to make room for Jarrett Hoffpauir. In 8 games with the Blue Jays, he worked in 11 1/3 innings with a 3.18 ERA.

=== Chiba Lotte Marines ===
On November 15, 2009, it was announced that Murphy would take a tryout for the Chiba Lotte Marines of Nippon Professional Baseball. In 2010, Murphy led the Marines to the Japan Series helping the team to win the championship along with being one of the top pitchers starting off the year undefeated 6-0 until his first loss against Yu Darvish. On the year, Murphy eventually held one of the best records finishing with 12 wins and 6 losses, with a better record than most in Japan including pitchers like Darvish, with a 3.75 ERA on the season. He played with the Marines in 2010 and 2011, appearing in 48 games (30 starts). In both seasons with the Marines, Murphy finished with a combined 14–11 record and an overall 3.81 ERA. He made history in 2010 by winning six consecutive games in Japan without a loss.

=== Toronto Blue Jays (second stint) ===
Murphy returned to the Toronto Blue Jays on a minor league contract on January 17, 2012, and was assigned to the Triple-A Las Vegas 51s. Murphy spent the entire 2012 season with the Las Vegas 51s with another winning record of 8-5 and an overall 4.38 ERA. Being one of the top pitchers with innings pitched in the PCL that season, Murphy was not granted a September call-up though his performance as starter/reliever is difficult in itself in the Triple-A Pacific Coast League.

=== Long Island Ducks/Camden Riversharks/7-Eleven Lions ===
Murphy played the 2013 season for the Long Island Ducks of the Atlantic League of Professional Baseball, helping lead them to yet another championship. In August 2014, it was announced that Murphy signed with the Camden Riversharks of the Atlantic League of Professional Baseball. In 2 starts of the 2014 season, Murphy has started 2 games, pitched 10 innings with 0 runs, 0.00 ERA and is 1–0 on the year in the 2014 Atlantic League.

After performing 2 scoreless starts with the Riversharks, going 1–0 with 10 scoreless innings, the Uni-President 7-Eleven Lions of Taiwan purchased his contract for the remainder of the 2014 season in hopes of obtaining another championship.
