= Ikuhiro Kiyota =

Japanese baseball player (born 1986)

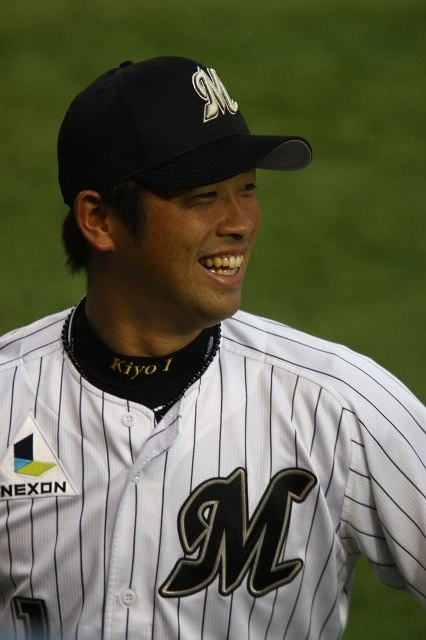
- Kiyota with the Chiba Lotte Marines in 2011
- Outfielder
- Born: February 11, 1986 (age 40); Kamagaya, Chiba, Japan
- Bats: Right Throws: Right

NPB debut
- May 24, 2010, for the Chiba Lotte Marines

NPB statistics
- Batting average: .258
- Hits: 716
- Home runs: 58
- RBI: 333
- Stolen Bases: 36
- Stats at Baseball Reference

Teams
- Chiba Lotte Marines (2010–2020)

Career highlights and awards
- Pacific League Best Nine Award (2015); Pacific League Golden Glove Award (2015); Japan Series champion (2010); NPB All-Star (2015)

Ikuhiro Kiyota (清田 育宏, born February 11, 1986) is a Japanese former professional baseball outfielder who played in Nippon Professional Baseball (NPB) for the Chiba Lotte Marines.

== Professional career ==
Kiyota began his professional career in 2010 with the Chiba Lotte Marines. He made his NPB debut on May 24, 2010, and won the Japan Series with the club that year. In 2011, Kiyota batted .244/.293/.370 with 3 home runs and 25 RBI. The next year, he had improved production, batting .281/.363/.391 with 3 home runs and 29 RBI. He regressed a bit in 2013, batting .255/.359/.375 with 3 home runs and 18 RBI. He struggled in 2014, batting just .170/.316/.511 in 24 games. In 2015, Kiyota had a breakout season, slashing .317/.387/.503 with career-highs in home runs (15) and RBI (67). He was named a Pacific League All-Star, won a Gold Glove Award, and won a Pacific League Best Nine Award.

Kiyota batted .225 with 6 home runs and 38 RBI on the year in 2016, but his production wavered the next year, as he hit only .203/.287/.286 with 3 home runs and 21 RBI. In 2018, Kiyota batted .226/.306/.295 with 2 home runs and 27 RBI. He improved the next year, posting a .253/.325/.378 batting line with 10 home runs and 57 RBI. In 2020, he continued to produce, hitting .278/.363/.467 with 7 home runs and 23 RBI in 70 games. On May 23, 2021, Kiyota was released by the Marines after he violated COVID-19 protocols in 2020 and had illicit relations with a woman after that.
