= Jun Byung-doo =

South Korean baseball player (born 1984)

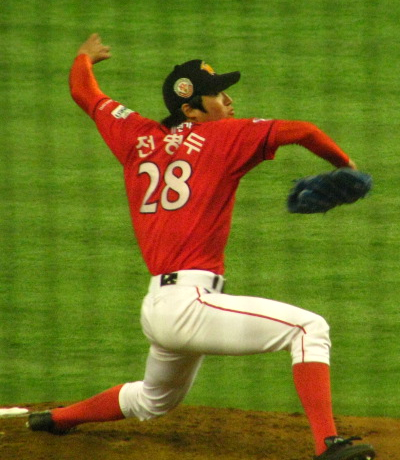
- Pitcher
- Born: October 14, 1984 (age 41)
- Bats: Left Throws: Left

KBO debut
- September 2, 2003, for the Doosan Bears

KBO statistics
- Win–loss record: 29-29
- Saves: 16
- Earned run average: 3.86
- Strikeouts: 512
- Stats at Baseball Reference

Teams
- Doosan Bears (2003–2005); Kia Tigers (2005–2008); SK Wyverns (2008–2011, 2016)

Jun Byung-doo
Medal record

Men's baseball

World Baseball Classic
Bronze medal – third place	2006 San Diego	Team

Jun Byung-doo (Korean: 전병두; Hanja: 全炳斗; born October 14, 1984 in Busan, South Korea) is a South Korean former left-handed starting pitcher. He pitched in the KBO League for the Doosan Bears, Kia Tigers, and SK Wyverns

== Professional career ==
Drafted by the Doosan Bears with the 1st pick in the second round of the 2003 KBO Draft, Jun made his pro debut on September 2, 2003. In 2005, Jun was traded to the Kia Tigers for Daniel Rios, and had his statistically outstanding season as a setup man and closer, going 3-2 with 5 saves and a 3.00 ERA in 57 innings pitched. After the 2005 KBO season, he was called up to the South Korea national baseball team for the inaugural World Baseball Classic held in March 2006. At the 2006 WBC, he played an important role as a left-handed specialist, appearing in the last three games for the South Korean team.

In the 2006 KBO season, he pitched 101.1 innings as a starter and long reliever with 94 strikeouts.

In 2007, however, Jun spent much of his time on the disabled list because of elbow trouble.

In the middle of the 2008 season, Jun was traded to the SK Wyverns. Sidelined by injuries, he only appeared in 10 games during the season, going 2-4 with a 4.64 ERA and 29 strikeouts in 33 innings pitched.

In 2009, Jun had the most productive season, establishing career-highs in almost every single pitching category. He was runner-up in ERA (3.11) behind Wyverns ace Kim Kwang-Hyun and fifth in strikeouts (136), going 8-4 with 8 saves. Jun became a fixture in the starting rotation until the All-Star break after being one of the Wyverns' most consistent pitchers in spring training, and appeared in games as a utility pitcher in the second half of the season. On May 23 against the Doosan Bears, Jun struck out 9 consecutive batters with a total of 13 strikeouts as a starter, falling one shy of Lee Dae-Jin's KBO record of 10 consecutive strikeouts.
