= Norifumi Nishimura =

Japanese baseball player and manager (born 1960)

Norifumi Nishimura 西村 徳文
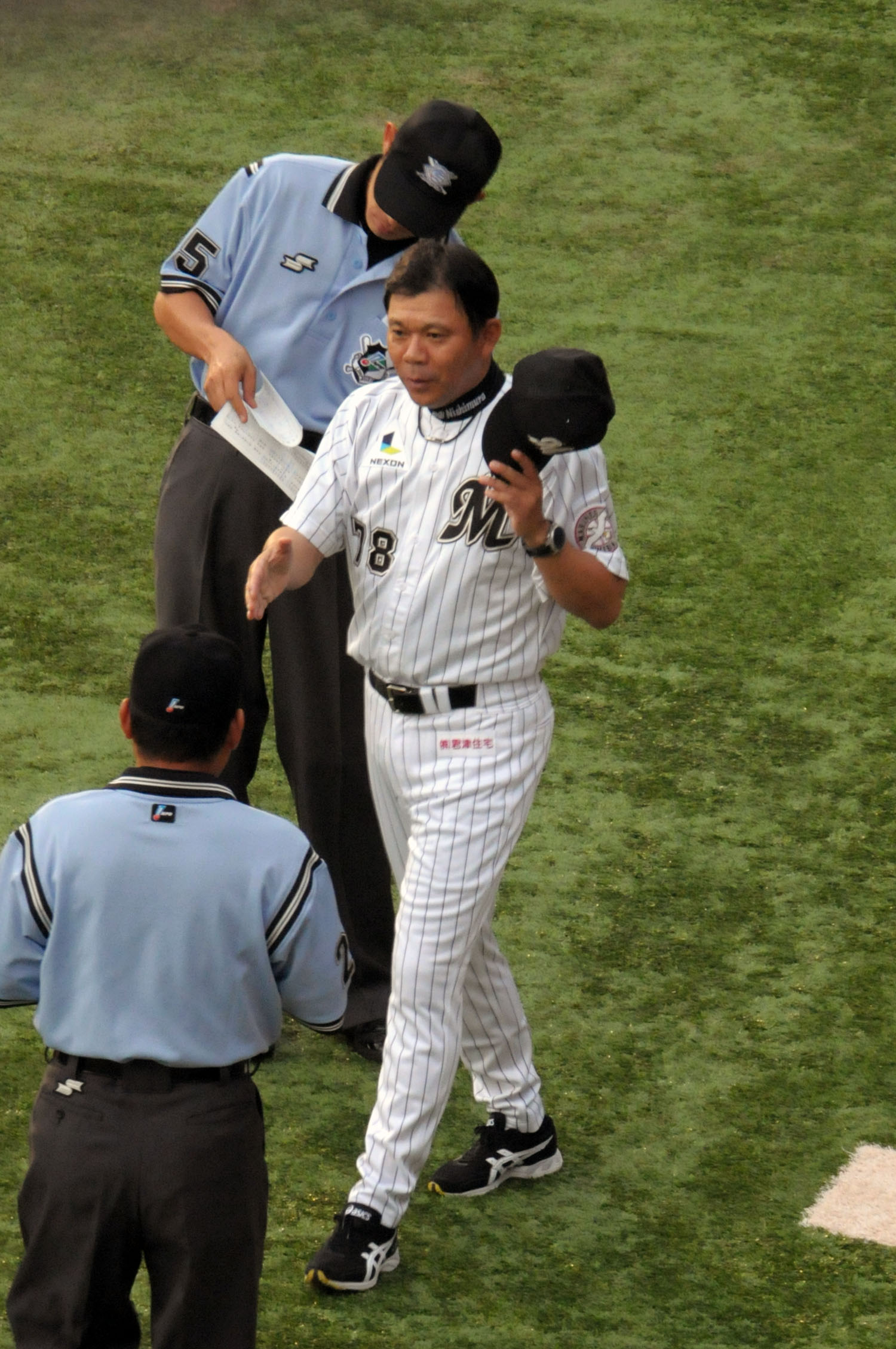
- Nishimura in 2011
- Infielder, Outfielder, Manager
- Born: January 9, 1960 (age 66); Kushima, Miyazaki
- Batted: Switch Threw: Right

NPB debut
- September 14, 1982, for the Lotte Orions

Last NPB appearance
- October 12, 1997, for the Chiba Lotte Marines

NPB statistics
- Batting average: .272
- Hits: 1,298
- Stolen bases: 363
- Managerial record: 268–321–39
- Winning %: .455

Teams
- As player: Lotte Orions/Chiba Lotte Marines (1982–1997); As manager: Chiba Lotte Marines (2010–2012); Orix Buffaloes (2019–2020); As coach: Chiba Lotte Marines (1998–2009); Orix Buffaloes (2016–2018)

Career highlights and awards
- 2× Pacific League Best Nine Award (1985, 1990); 2× Pacific League Golden Glove Award (1985, 1990); 4× Pacific League stolen base leader (1986–1989); 1× Pacific League Batting Champion (1990); 5× NPB All-Star (1985, 1987, 1988, 1990, 1993); 1× Matsutaro Shoriki Award (2010)
- Last updated on: 9 November 2024

Norifumi Nishimura (西村 徳文, Nishimura Norifumi; born January 9, 1960 in Kushima, Miyazaki) is a former Nippon Professional Baseball player and current manager. Nishimura spent the entirety of his 16-year playing career with the Chiba Lotte Marines. After retiring, he coached for the team until being named the successor to former Marines-manager Bobby Valentine in late 2009.

Sporting positions
Preceded by Bobby Valentine	Chiba Lotte Marines manager 2010–2012	Succeeded by Tsutomu Ito
Preceded by Junichi Fukura	Orix Buffaloes manager 2019–2020	Succeeded by Satoshi Nakajima
