= Cha Woo-chan =

South Korean baseball player (born 1987)

Cha Woo-chan 차우찬
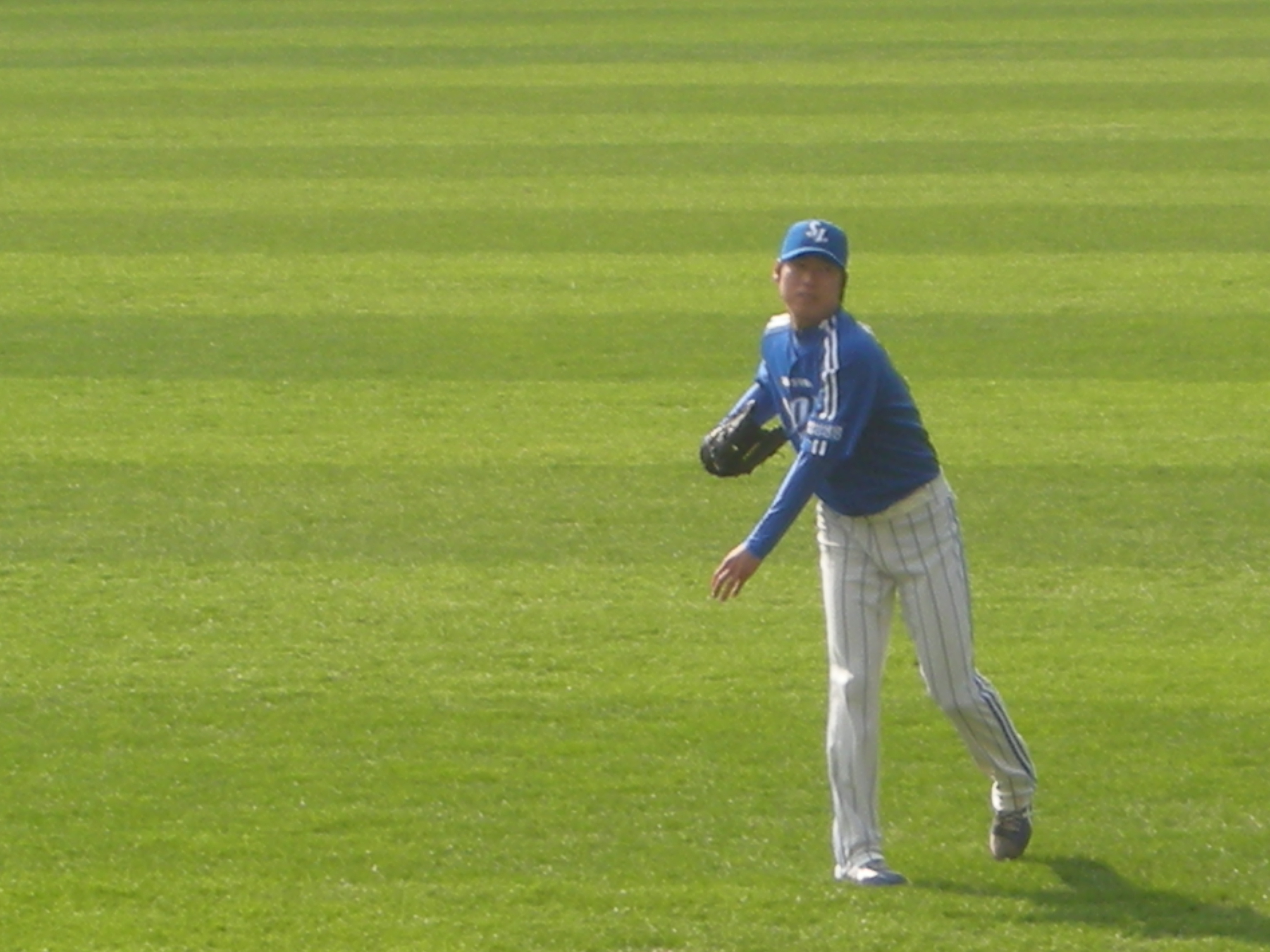
- Cha with the Samsung Lions (KBO) during a game in 2010
- Pitcher
- Born: May 31, 1987 (age 39); Gunsan, North Jeolla
- Batted: Left Threw: Left

KBO debut
- April 9, 2006, for the Samsung Lions

Last KBO appearance
- July 5, 2021, for the LG Twins

KBO statistics
- Win–loss record: 112–79
- Earned run average: 4.51
- Strikeouts: 1,413
- Stats at Baseball Reference

Teams
- Samsung Lions (2006–2016); LG Twins (2017–2021)

Career highlights and awards
- KBO Strikeout leader (2015)
Medals
Men's baseball
Representing South Korea
2015 WBSC Premier12
Gold medal – first place	2015 Tokyo	Team

Cha Woo-chan (born May 31, 1987) is a South Korean former professional baseball pitcher who played for the LG Twins of KBO League.

He played for Samsung until the 2016 season and moved to Samsung on December 14, 2016, signing a free agent contract on the condition of 9.5 billion won in total four years. The team explained that he had recruited him to set the stage for future championship challenges.

== Personal life ==
In May 2017, it was revealed that he is in a relationship with top model and TV personality Han Hye-jin. However, it was announced that the two broke up after six months of dating.
