= Adam Stern =

Canadian baseball player (born 1980)

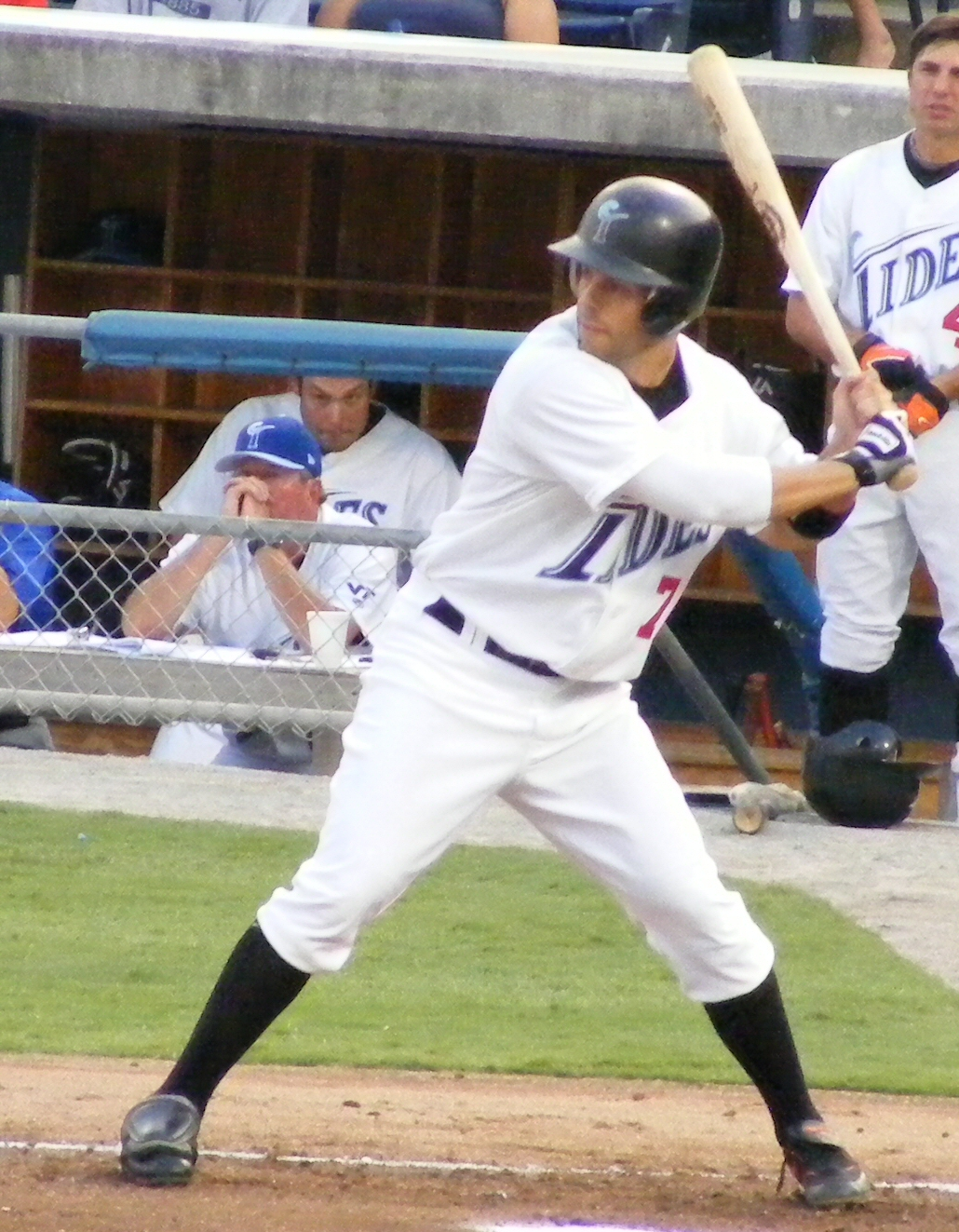
- Stern with the Norfolk Tides
- Outfielder
- Born: February 12, 1980 (age 46); London, Ontario, Canada
- Batted: Left Threw: Right

MLB debut
- July 7, 2005, for the Boston Red Sox

Last MLB appearance
- May 31, 2010, for the Milwaukee Brewers

MLB statistics
- Batting average: .116
- Home runs: 1
- Runs batted in: 7
- Stats at Baseball Reference

Teams
- Boston Red Sox (2005–2006); Baltimore Orioles (2007); Milwaukee Brewers (2010)
Medals
Men's baseball
Representing Canada
Baseball World Cup
Bronze medal – third place	2009 Nettuno	Team

Adam James Stern (born February 12, 1980) is a Canadian former professional baseball outfielder. He played in Major League Baseball (MLB) for the Boston Red Sox, Baltimore Orioles, and Milwaukee Brewers from 2005 to 2010.

Stern is the second Jewish player from Canada in major league history (following Goody Rosen). He, Kevin Youkilis, and Gabe Kapler set a record for most Jewish players on a team at once since the expansion era.

== Early life and college career ==
Stern was born in London, Ontario. He is Jewish on his father's side. In his youth, Stern participated in baseball, track and field, and volleyball.

Stern played for the London Badgers Baseball Club in London, Ontario from the age of 16 to the age of 18.

Stern played three years on a baseball scholarship at the University of Nebraska–Lincoln, from which he graduated with a Sociology degree. He hit .356 as a sophomore in 2000 to earn 2nd-Team All-Big 12 honors. After the 2000 season, he played collegiate summer baseball with the Harwich Mariners of the Cape Cod Baseball League and was named a league all-star. In 2001, he appeared in the College World Series, and was named First-Team Academic All-Big 12, as well as an All-Big 12 Honorable Mention, after hitting .292 with 68 runs and 27 stolen bases in 64 games.

Stern was drafted twice: first, by the Toronto Blue Jays in the 22nd round (651st overall) of the 1998 MLB draft, and then by the Atlanta Braves in the 3rd round (105th overall) of the 2001 MLB draft, before moving to the Boston Red Sox in 2004 as a Rule 5 draft pick.

== Minor league career ==
In 2002, Stern stole 40 bases in 48 attempts for Myrtle Beach in the Carolina League.

In 2004, while playing for the Greenville Braves, Stern started in left field for the Southern League's Eastern Division All-Star team, and was named an outfielder on the league's year-end All-Star club. He hit .322 with 64 runs, 26 doubles, and 27 stolen bases in 102 games. He ranked 3rd in the league in hitting, 8th with a .378 on-base percentage, and 9th with a .480 slugging percentage. His 27 steals were 3rd-most in the Braves system, and he had 41 multi-hit games in 99 starts. He was named Atlanta's Double-A Player of the Year. Stern missed 26 games to play for Team Canada at the 2004 Summer Olympics in Athens, where he hit .250 (8-for-32) with 4 RBIs and 9 runs in 9 games.

The Boston Red Sox made Stern a Rule 5 draft selection from the Braves in 2004. In 2005, he batted .321 (26-for-81) with 8 doubles, 14 RBIs, and 3 steals during a pair of rehab stints with Pawtucket, including a 21-game hitting streak.

In 2009, while playing for the Huntsville Stars, as of July 9 Stern was second in the Southern League in steals (27), runs (58), and triples (6), and third in hits (95). Stern was selected to be a starting right fielder for the Southern League North Division All Star team, with the game to be played July 14 in Birmingham. Promoted to Nashville, he batted .310.

In 2010, he batted .325/.399/.462 for Nashville, in 86 games.

== Major league career ==
=== Boston Red Sox (2005–06) ===
Stern made his major league debut with the Red Sox on July 7, 2005. His debut was delayed first by a fractured right thumb he sustained while sliding in spring training, then by a hamstring injury.

On August 8, 2005, while playing for the Red Sox, Stern took the field in the 9th inning along with Kevin Youkilis and Gabe Kapler, setting a "record" for the most Jewish players on the field at one time in American League history and the most in Major League Baseball history since four Jews took the field for the New York Giants in a game in 1941.

He played all three outfield positions in 2005, but was used primarily in right field. Due to injuries in 2005, Stern fell short of the time Rule 5 picks are required to be on a 25-man major league roster. After spending 18 days on the roster to start the 2006 season (during which he made a game-saving catch against the Devil Rays), as required to fulfill his Rule 5 obligations, Stern was optioned to Pawtucket on April 20. With the Red Sox, he again played all three outfield positions in 2006, but was used primarily in center field.

Over the first two years of his major league career, he played errorless defense with better than average range at each position.

=== Baltimore Orioles (2007–08) ===
On October 3, 2006, Stern passed through waivers and was traded by the Red Sox to the Baltimore Orioles to complete a deal for catcher Javy López and cash.

In January 2007, Stern reached a one-year deal with the Orioles. Limited to 14 games in spring training, because of a strained right oblique muscle and a bout of food poisoning, Stern was 5–18 with 3 walks, 3 strikeouts, and 3 stolen bases in 3 attempts. On March 28, the Orioles optioned Stern to the Triple-A Norfolk Tides. Norfolk vice president Jim Duquette noted, "With Stern, we didn't feel like we had the opportunity to see an awful lot of him, and we feel like he needs more time down in the minor leagues. He was one of the guys we were talking about all spring."

Stern was called up to the Orioles on April 17 to replace Corey Patterson, who was placed on the bereavement list. He appeared in two games, playing three innings in the outfield with no plate appearances. He was released by the Orioles on June 10, 2008.

=== Milwaukee Brewers (2009–10) ===
Stern signed a minor league contract with the Milwaukee Brewers in January 2009. Stern had an excellent spring, batting .432 with 12 RBI and six stolen bases in 42 at-bats. Stern said: "You try to put together a good spring so they'll notice." "He had a good spring for us", said general manager Doug Melvin. "He was swinging the bat good (in Nashville). He can do a lot of things. He gets after it pretty good."

Stern was called up to the active roster on May 11, 2010, from the Triple-A Nashville Sounds, where he was batting .349 in 12 games when Carlos Gómez was placed on the disabled list. He said: "Any time you get to put a big league uniform on you look forward to it. I'm excited for the opportunity." Stern made his first appearance for the Brewers on May 14. It was his first appearance playing in the majors since the 2007 season, and his first at-bat since the 2006 season. Stern said: "I'm just happy that they gave me an opportunity to get back to the big leagues. I know how tough it is to get back here, and that makes me appreciate it that much more." Stern filed for free agency following the conclusion of the 2010 season.

== Team Canada ==
On March 8, 2006, Stern had a superb game for Team Canada against the United States in the first World Baseball Classic, just a double short of hitting for the cycle, including an inside-the-park home run, and driving in 4 runs. He also made a couple of excellent catches in center field. Canada won the game 8–6, pulling off the biggest upset of the tournament. In the series, he batted 6 for 9.

In January 2007, he was awarded the first Stubby Clapp Award at the fifth annual Baseball Canada fund raiser.

In March 2008, he played for Team Canada in Taiwan as they competed in an 8-team tournament for a berth in the 2008 Summer Olympics. They won one of the three tickets to the Summer Games, joining Taiwan and South Korea. Stern played center field for Team Canada in all seven of their games at the Olympics, contributing four runs, four hits and three RBIs.

In March 2009, Stern played for Team Canada in the 2009 World Baseball Classic.

== Post-playing career ==
In 2013, Stern re-joined the Red Sox organization as a scout, and is now scouting for the Kansas City Royals. He owns Centrefield Sports, a multi-purpose facility and is the Director of Player Development for the Great Lake Canadians.

== See also ==
- List of Jewish Major League Baseball players
- Rule 5 draft results
