= Kwon Hyuk (baseball) =

South Korean baseball player

- Relief pitcher
- Born: November 6, 1983 (age 42)
- Batted: Left Threw: Left

KBO debut
- October 14, 2002, for the Samsung Lions

Last KBO appearance
- August 18, 2020, for the Doosan Bears

KBO statistics
- Win–loss record: 58–47
- Earned run average: 3.79
- Strikeouts: 762
- Stats at Baseball Reference

Teams
- Samsung Lions (2002–2014); Hanwha Eagles (2015–2018); Doosan Bears (2019–2020)
Medals
Men's baseball
Representing South Korea
Gold medal – first place	2008 Beijing	Team

- Kwon Hyuk
- Hangul: 권혁
- Hanja: 權赫
- RR: Gwon Hyeok
- MR: Kwŏn Hyŏk

Kwon Hyuk (Korean: 권혁; Hanja: 權赫; born November 6, 1983, in Daegu, South Korea) is a baseball player from South Korea who won a gold medal at the 2008 Summer Olympics.
