= Shoitsu Omatsu =

Japanese baseball player (born 1982)

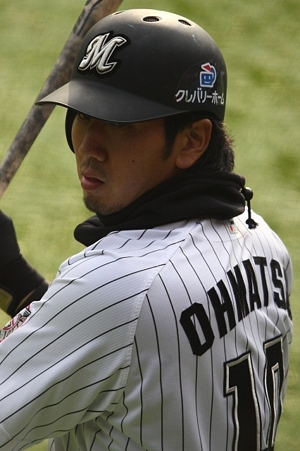
- Omatsu with the Chiba Lotte Marines

Tokyo Yakult Swallows – No. 78
- Outfielder / First baseman / Coach
- Born: June 16, 1982 (age 44)
- Batted: Left Threw: Left

NPB debut
- September 12, 2005, for the Chiba Lotte Marines

Last NPB appearance
- October 3, 2017, for the Tokyo Yakult Swallows

NPB statistics (through 2017)
- Batting average: .245
- Hits: 650
- Home runs: 84
- RBI: 367
- Stolen bases: 3
- Stats at Baseball Reference

Teams
- As player: Chiba Lotte Marines (2005–2015); Tokyo Yakult Swallows (2017); Fukui Miracle Elephants (2019); As coach: Tokyo Yakult Swallows (2020–)

Shoitsu Omatsu (大松 尚逸, born June 16, 1982, in Kanazawa, Ishikawa) is a Japanese former professional baseball outfielder in Japan's Nippon Professional Baseball. He played with the Chiba Lotte Marines from 2005 to 2015 and with the Tokyo Yakult Swallows in 2017. He has been a coach since 2020.
