= Tatsuya Uchi =

Japanese baseball player (born 1985)

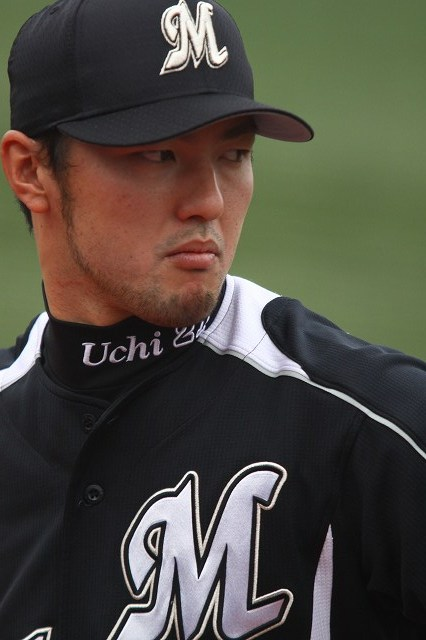
- Uchi with the Chiba Lotte Marines

Free agent
- Pitcher
- Born: July 13, 1985 (age 41); Kawasaki, Kanagawa
- Bats: Right Throws: Right

NPB debut
- June 15, 2004, for the Chiba Lotte Marines

NPB statistics (through 2018 season)
- Win–loss record: 20–12
- Earned run average: 3.33
- Strikeouts: 311
- Stats at Baseball Reference

Teams
- Chiba Lotte Marines (2004, 2006, 2009-2018)

Career highlights and awards
- NPB All-Star (2018)

Tatsuya Uchi (内 竜也, born July 13, 1985, in Kawasaki, Kanagawa) is a Japanese professional baseball pitcher who is a free agent. He has previously played in Nippon Professional Baseball (NPB) for the Chiba Lotte Marines.

== Career ==
Chiba Lotte Marines selected Uchi with the first selection in the 2003 NPB draft.

On June 15, 2004, Uchi made his NPB debut.

He selected 2018 NPB All-Star game. On November 4, 2020, Chiba Lotte announced that Uchi's contract would not be renewed for the 2021 season.

On December 2, 2020, he became a free agent.
