= 2010 Nippon Professional Baseball season =

2010 NPB season
- League: Nippon Professional Baseball
- Sport: Baseball
- Duration: March 20 – November 7

Central League pennant
- League champions: Chunichi Dragons
- Runners-up: Hanshin Tigers
- Season MVP: Kazuhiro Wada (Chunichi)

Pacific League pennant
- League champions: Fukuoka SoftBank Hawks
- Runners-up: Saitama Seibu Lions
- Season MVP: Tsuyoshi Wada (SoftBank)

Climax Series
- CL champions: Chunichi Dragons
- CL runners-up: Yomiuri Giants
- PL champions: Chiba Lotte Marines
- PL runners-up: Fukuoka SoftBank Hawks

Japan Series
- Venue: Chiba Marine Stadium, Chiba City, Chiba; Vantelin Dome Nagoya, Nagoya, Aichi
- Champions: Chiba Lotte Marines
- Runners-up: Chunichi Dragons
- Finals MVP: Toshiaki Imae (Lotte)

NPB seasons
- ← 2009 2011 →

The 2010 Nippon Professional Baseball season was the 61st season since the NPB was reorganized in 1950.

== Final standings ==
=== Central League ===
2010 Central League standings
Team	Pld	W	L	T	PCT	GB
Chunichi Dragons	144	79	62	3	.559	—
Hanshin Tigers	144	78	63	3	.552	1
Yomiuri Giants	144	79	64	1	.552	1
Tokyo Yakult Swallows	144	72	68	4	.514	6.5
Hiroshima Carp	144	58	84	2	.410	21.5
Yokohama BayStars	144	48	95	1	.337	32

Source: https://npb.jp/bis/eng/2010/stats/

=== Pacific League ===
2010 Pacific League standings
Team	Pld	W	L	T	PCT	GB
Fukuoka SoftBank Hawks	144	76	63	5	.545	—
Saitama Seibu Lions	144	78	65	1	.545	—
Chiba Lotte Marines	144	75	67	2	.528	2.5
Hokkaido Nippon-Ham Fighters	144	74	67	3	.524	3
Orix Buffaloes	144	69	71	4	.493	7.5
Tohoku Rakuten Golden Eagles	144	62	79	3	.441	15

Source: https://npb.jp/bis/eng/2010/stats/

== Climax Series ==
Note: All of the games that are played in the first two rounds of the Climax Series are held at the higher seed's home stadium. The team with the higher regular-season standing also advances if the round ends in a tie.

First stage
Central League
2	Hanshin Tigers	0
3	Yomiuri Giants	2
Pacific League
2	Saitama Seibu Lions	0
3	Chiba Lotte Marines	2

Final stage
1	Chunichi Dragons	4
3	Yomiuri Giants	1
1	Fukuoka SoftBank Hawks	3
3	Chiba Lotte Marines	4

Japan Series
CL1	Chunichi Dragons	2
PL3	Chiba Lotte Marines	4

=== Central League first stage ===
Game	Score	Date	Location	Attendance
1	Hanshin Tigers 1 – 3 Yomiuri Giants	October 16	Koshien Stadium	46,868
2	Hanshin Tigers 6 – 7 Yomiuri Giants	October 17	Koshien Stadium	46,875

Yomiuri Giants win series 2–0

=== Central League final stage ===
Chunichi Dragons have one-win advantage

Game	Score	Date	Location	Attendance
1	Chunichi Dragons 5 – 0 Yomiuri Giants	October 20	Nagoya Dome	37,659
2	Chunichi Dragons 2 – 0 Yomiuri Giants	October 21	Nagoya Dome	37,298
3	Chunichi Dragons 2 – 3 Yomiuri Giants	October 22	Nagoya Dome	38,432
4	Chunichi Dragons 4 – 3 Yomiuri Giants	October 23	Nagoya Dome	38,432

Chunichi Dragons win series 4–1.

=== Pacific League first stage ===
Game	Score	Date	Location	Attendance
1	Saitama Seibu Lions 5 – 6 Chiba Lotte Marines	October 9	Seibu Dome	33,918
2	Saitama Seibu Lions 4 – 5 Chiba Lotte Marines	October 10	Seibu Dome	33,911

Chiba Lotte Marines win series 2–0

=== Pacific League final stage ===
Fukuoka SoftBank Hawks have one-win advantage

Game	Score	Date	Location	Attendance
1	Fukuoka SoftBank Hawks 1 – 3 Chiba Lotte Marines	October 14	Fukuoka Yahoo! Japan Dome	35,118
2	Fukuoka SoftBank Hawks 3 – 1 Chiba Lotte Marines	October 15	Fukuoka Yahoo! Japan Dome	35,876
3	Fukuoka SoftBank Hawks 1 – 0 Chiba Lotte Marines	October 16	Fukuoka Yahoo! Japan Dome	36,664
4	Fukuoka SoftBank Hawks 2 – 4 Chiba Lotte Marines	October 17	Fukuoka Yahoo! Japan Dome	36,235
5	Fukuoka SoftBank Hawks 2 – 5 Chiba Lotte Marines	October 18	Fukuoka Yahoo! Japan Dome	33,108
6	Fukuoka SoftBank Hawks 0 – 7 Chiba Lotte Marines	October 19	Fukuoka Yahoo! Japan Dome	33,515

Chiba Lotte Marines win series 4–3.

== Japan Series ==
Game	Score	Date	Location	Attendance
1	Chunichi Dragons 2 – 5 Chiba Lotte Marines	October 30	Nagoya Dome	38,066
2	Chunichi Dragons 12 – 1 Chiba Lotte Marines	October 31	Nagoya Dome	38,065
3	Chiba Lotte Marines 7 – 1 Chunichi Dragons	November 2	Chiba Marine Stadium	26,923
4	Chiba Lotte Marines 3 – 4 Chunichi Dragons	November 3	Chiba Marine Stadium	27,197
5	Chiba Lotte Marines 10 – 4 Chunichi Dragons	November 4	Chiba Marine Stadium	27,209
6	Chunichi Dragons 2 – 2 Chiba Lotte Marines	November 6	Nagoya Dome	38,094
7	Chunichi Dragons 7 – 8 Chiba Lotte Marines	November 7	Nagoya Dome	38,075

Chiba Lotte Marines win series 4–2

== League leaders ==
=== Central League ===
Batting leaders
Stat	Player	Team	Total
Batting average	Norichika Aoki	Tokyo Yakult Swallows	.358
Home runs	Alex Ramirez	Yomiuri Giants	49
Runs batted in	Alex Ramirez	Yomiuri Giants	129
Runs	Hayato Sakamoto	Yomiuri Giants	107
Hits	Matt Murton	Hanshin Tigers	214
Stolen bases	Eishin Soyogi	Hiroshima Toyo Carp	43

Pitching leaders
Stat	Player	Team	Total
Wins	Kenta Maeda	Hiroshima Toyo Carp	15
Earned run average	Kenta Maeda	Hiroshima Toyo Carp	2.21
Strikeouts	Kenta Maeda	Hiroshima Toyo Carp	174
Innings pitched	Kenta Maeda	Hiroshima Toyo Carp	215.2
Saves	Hitoki Iwase	Chunichi Dragons	42
Holds	Takuya Asao	Chunichi Dragons	47
Winning percentage	Yasutomo Kubo	Hanshin Tigers	.737

=== Pacific League ===
Batting leaders
Stat	Player	Team	Total
Batting average	Tsuyoshi Nishioka	Chiba Lotte Marines	.346
Home runs	Takahiro Okada	Fukuoka SoftBank Hawks	33
Runs batted in	Eiichi Koyano	Hokkaido Nippon-Ham Fighters	109
Runs	Tsuyoshi Nishioka	Chiba Lotte Marines	121
Hits	Tsuyoshi Nishioka	Chiba Lotte Marines	206
Stolen bases	Yuichi Honda; Yasuyuki Kataoka	Fukuoka SoftBank Hawks; Saitama Seibu Lions	59

Pitching leaders
Stat	Player	Team	Total
Wins	Tsuyoshi Wada; Chihiro Kaneko	Fukuoka SoftBank Hawks; Orix Buffaloes	17
Earned run average	Yu Darvish	Hokkaido Nippon-Ham Fighters	1.78
Strikeouts	Yu Darvish	Hokkaido Nippon-Ham Fighters	222
Innings pitched	Chihiro Kaneko	Orix Buffaloes	204.1
Saves	Brian Sikorski	Saitama Seibu Lions	33
Holds	Brian Falkenborg	Fukuoka SoftBank Hawks	39
Winning percentage	Toshiya Sugiuchi	Fukuoka SoftBank Hawks	.696

== See also ==
- 2010 Korea Professional Baseball season
- 2010 Major League Baseball season
