= Lin An-ko =

Taiwanese baseball player (born 1997)

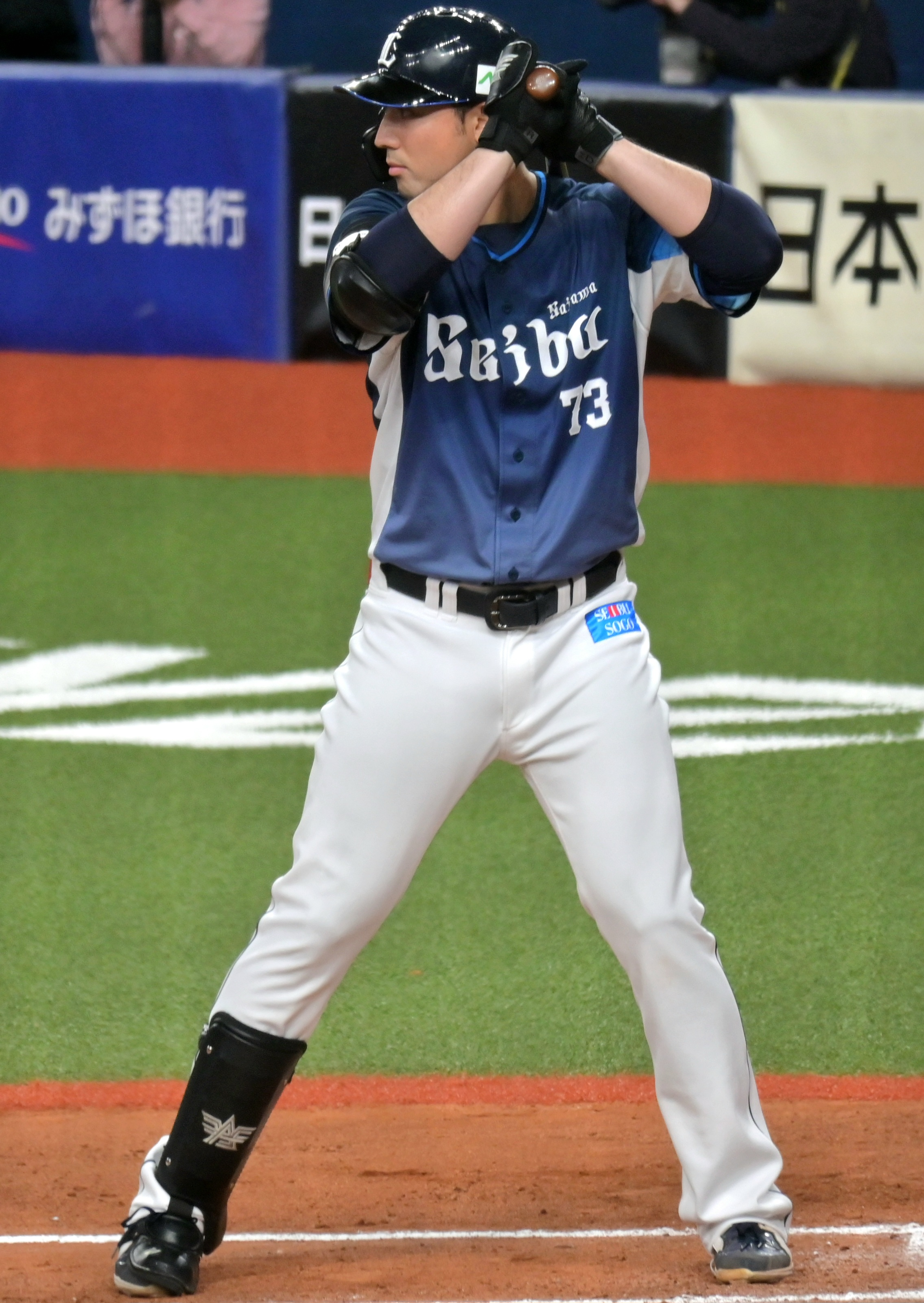
- Lin batting at the Kyocera Dome on April 16, 2026

Saitama Seibu Lions – No. 73
- Outfielder
- Born: May 19, 1997 (age 29); Tainan, Taiwan
- Bats: Left Throws: Left
- NPB: March 28, 2026, for the Saitama Seibu Lions

CPBL statistics (through 2025 season)
- Batting average: .287
- Home runs: 112
- Runs batted in: 399

NPB statistics (through August 28, 2026)
- Batting average: .237
- Home runs: 7
- Runs batted in: 22
- Stats at Baseball Reference

Teams
- Uni-President 7-Eleven Lions (2019–2025); Saitama Seibu Lions (2026–present)
Medals
Representing Chinese Taipei
Men's baseball
WBSC Premier12
Gold medal – first place	2024 Tokyo	Team
Asian Games
Silver medal – second place	2022 Hangzhou	Team

Lin An-ko (Chinese: 林安可; born May 19, 1997) is a Taiwanese professional baseball outfielder for the Saitama Seibu Lions of Nippon Professional Baseball (NPB). He previously played in the Chinese Professional Baseball League (CPBL) for the Uni-President 7-Eleven Lions.

== Early life ==
Lin was born on May 19, 1997, in Tainan, Taiwan to a Taiwanese father and an Argentinian mother. He started playing baseball in fourth grade, and attended Jiansing Junior High School and Nan Ying Vocational School, where he played as a two-way player. He went to Chinese Culture University, where he played as a pitcher; only having one at-bat as a hitter. In 2018, Lin participated in a week-long tryout organized by the Tohoku Rakuten Golden Eagles of Nippon Professional Baseball, but ultimately failed to sign a contract because of issues with his medical examination.

== Career ==
=== Uni-President 7-Eleven Lions ===
On July 1, 2019, the Uni-President 7-Eleven Lions selected Lin as the 4th overall pick in the 2019 CPBL Draft as a two-way player. On August 10, he debuted against the Lamigo Monkeys, starting at right field and batting third. He went 0-for-4, striking out twice. On the next day, August 11, Lin got his first hit: a single in the second inning against Matthew Grimes. He then hit his first home run in the 5th inning in the same game.

Before the start of the 2020 season, Lin and his coaches decided to give up on pitching to focus on hitting, citing the fact that Lin could not reach 145 km/h. On September 29, Lin hit his 30th home run of the season and broke the record of the most home runs by a rookie in a single season, previously set by Wang Po-jung. Lin finished the 2020 season with a .310 batting average, 32 home runs, and 99 RBIs. He was the home run leader and RBI leader, resulting in him being selected as outfielder for the Best 10 Award and his selection as the 2020 CPBL Rookie of the Year.

On March 8, 2022, Lin fractured his right hamate bone in a preseason game against the Fubon Guardians, ruling him out for three months.

On July 30, 2023, Lin won the CPBL Home Run Derby after defeating teammate Su Chih-chieh 8–7 in the final round.

On June 28, 2025, Lin hit his 100th career home run off Roenis Elías in the 4th inning of a game against the Fubon Guardians, making him the 27th player in CPBL history to do so.

On November 3, 2025, Lin was posted by the Lions.

=== Saitama Seibu Lions ===
On November 17, 2025, the Saitama Seibu Lions of the Nippon Professional Baseball officially acquired the right to negotiate Lin's contract, and on November 21, Lin signed with the Lions on a two-year contract with a one-year team option, worth around ¥150 million yen.

On March 28, 2026, Lin made his NPB debut in a 11–0 loss to the Chiba Lotte Marines, going 1-for-4 with a single off Haruya Tanaka. On April 8, Lin faced off against fellow Taiwanese national Hsu Jo-hsi of the Fukuoka SoftBank Hawks, a match-up highly anticipated in Taiwan. Lin went 1-for-3 with a single, extending his streak of 9 consecutive game with a hit. This streak ended the next day, on the 9th, where Lin was only able to draw a walk and go 0-for-2. On April 12, Lin hit his first NPB home run, a walk-off homer off Sam Long of the Marines in the 10th inning. On April 25, Lin hit his second NPB home run off Masaya Nishigaki of the Tohoku Rakuten Golden Eagles, going 3-for-4 with 4 RBIs. After a stint with the second team, Lin hit his first home run in 77 days on July 11, against Sachiya Yamasaki of the Hokkaido Nippon-Ham Fighters. The following day, Lin hit two home runs, both coming against Ren Fukushima of the Fighters, earning him his first multi-homer game in Japan.

== International career ==
Lin represented Chinese Taipei at the 2015 U-18 Baseball World Cup and the 2016 U-23 Baseball World Cup.

On September 2, 2022, Lin was invited to play for Argentina in the 2023 World Baseball Classic qualifiers, but he declined, citing that he had just healed from an injury.

On January 13, 2023, Lin was selected on Chinese Taipei's 36-man preliminary roster for the 2023 World Baseball Classic, but was dropped for the final 30-man roster, with the Chinese Taipei's manager citing Lin's defensive issues.

Lin played for Chinese Taipei in the 2022 Asian Games, where on October 2, 2023, he hit a crucial triple against Moon Dong-ju to score Chinese Taipei's first run of a 4–0 win against South Korea. Chinese Taipei eventually lost to South Korea in the championship game on October 7, resulting in a second-place finish.

On October 7, 2024, Lin was selected to play for Chinese Taipei in the 2024 WBSC Premier12. On November 23, in a game against Japan, Lin came off the bench in the sixth inning, and hit a home run off Rikuto Yokoyama in the 9th. However, Chinese Taipei lost the game 6–9. On November 24, in the sixth inning of the championship game against Japan's Chihiro Sumida, Lin hit a fly ball into the right-field stands near the foul pole, but the ball was confirmed to be foul. Lin subsequently struck out.

Lin played in the 2026 World Baseball Classic, but struggled to a 1-for-15 record and 4 strikeouts.
