= Pingtan =

Pingtan may refer to:

- Suzhou pingtan (苏州评弹), a variety of traditional Chinese storytelling

== Places in China ==
- Pingtan County (平潭县), Fuzhou, Fujian
- Pingtan Island (平潭岛), main island of Pingtan County, Fuzhou
- Pingtan Township (坪坦乡), Tongdao Dong Autonomous County, Hunan

=== Towns ===
- Pingtan, Chongqing (平滩)
- Pingtan, Guangdong (平潭), in Huizhou, Guangdong
- Pingtan, Shanxi (平坦), in Yangquan, Shanxi
- Pingtan, Dazhou (平滩), Sichuan
- Pingtan, Neijiang (平坦), Sichuan
- Pingtan, Yuechi County (坪滩), Sichuan
