= Kim Dong-heon (baseball) =

South Korean baseball player

Kiwoom Heroes – No. 44
- Catcher
- Born: July 15, 2004 (age 22); Seoul, South Korea
- Bats: Right Throws: Right

KBO debut
- April 4, 2023, for the Kiwoom Heroes

KBO statistics (through 2026)
- Batting average: .204
- Home runs: 2
- Runs batted in: 19
- Stats at Baseball Reference

Teams
- Kiwoom Heroes (2023–present)
Medals
Men's baseball
Representing South Korea
Asian Games
Gold medal – first place	2022 Hangzhou	Team

Kim Dong-heon (Korean: 김동헌; born July 15, 2004) is a South Korean professional baseball catcher for the Kiwoom Heroes of the KBO League. He appeared in two baseball contests during the 2022 Asian Games, and won a gold medal for South Korea.
