= Baseball at the 2022 Asian Games =

Baseball competition

- Venue: Shaoxing Baseball & Softball Sports Center
- Dates: 26 September – 7 October 2023
- Competitors: 207 from 9 nations

Baseball at the 2022 Asian Games was held in Shaoxing, China from 26 September to 7 October 2023. The top six ranked teams advanced to the main draw. The bottom three teams competed, with the top two qualifiers advancing to the main draw.

== Schedule ==
Q	Qualification	P	Preliminary round	S	Super round	F	Finals

Event↓/Date →	26th Tue	27th Wed	28th Thu	29th Fri	30th Sat	1st Sun	2nd Mon	3rd Tue	4th Wed	5th Thu	6th Fri	7th Sat
Men	Q	Q	Q			P	P	P		S	S	F

== Medalists ==
Event	Gold	Silver	Bronze
Men	South Korea; Moon Dong-ju; Park Seong-han; Kim Hye-seong; Kim Ju-won; Roh Si-hwan; Kim Seong-yoon; Moon Bo-gyeong; Jang Hyun-seok; Jung Woo-young; Kim Young-kyu; Won Tae-in; Go Woo-suk; Park Se-woong; Kim Dong-heon; Kim Hyung-jun; Choi Won-jun; Choi Ji-min; Na Gyun-an; Gwak Been; Kang Baek-ho; Choi Ji-hoon; Kim Ji-chan; Park Yeong-hyun; Yoon Dong-hee	Chinese Taipei; Chen Min-sih; Lin Tzu-hao; Lin Tzu-wei; Li I-wei; Liao Chun-kai; Cheng Tsung-che; Lyle Lin; Gu Lin Ruei-yang; Liu Chih-jung; Wu Sheng-feng; Wang Yan-cheng; Shen Hao-wei; Wu Nien-ting; Lee Hao-yu; Chen Po-yu; Lin Yu-min; Cheng Hao-chun; Lai Po-wei; Yang Chen-yu; Wang Cheng-hao; Lin An-ko; Lin Li; Dai Pei-fong; Pan Wen-hui	Japan; Kazuya Shimokawa; Toshifumi Kaneko; Shoji Kitamura; Naoya Mochizuki; Hisaya Nammoku; Hiroki Nakagawa; Motoki Mukoyama; Jin Nakamura; Masashi Maruyama; Mizuki Kato; Yoshiki Fuchigami; Kisho Iwamoto; Makoto Hori; Yuki Katayama; Katsutoshi Satake; Shuichiro Kayo; Shunya Morita; Takehiro Tsujino; Kohei Sasagawa; Tatsuhiko Sato; Seifu Suzuki; Ryo Kinami; Ryuga Ihara; Junichi Tazawa

== Draw ==
The top six ranked teams advanced to the main draw. The bottom three teams competed in the first stage, with the top two advancing to the main draw. The teams were distributed according to their position at the WBSC World Rankings.

Group A

- Japan
- China
- Philippines
- First stage – Team 2

Group B

- South Korea
- Chinese Taipei
- Hong Kong
- First stage – Team 1

First stage

- Thailand
- Laos
- Singapore

== Squads ==
Squads

China	Chinese Taipei	Hong Kong	Japan
Zhang Wentao; Lu Yun; Wang Shuai; Liang Pei; Yang Jin; Zheng Chaoqun; Suo Xudi; Li Ning; Wang Weiyi; Yi Jian; Huadancairang; Chen Chen; Cao Jie; Gan Quan; Wang Xiang; Chen Jiaji; Li Ningji; Kou Yongkang; Luo Jinjun; Wang Bin; Du Nan; Li Yuyang; Su Changlong; Cui Enting	Chen Min-sih; Lin Tzu-hao; Lin Tzu-wei; Li I-wei; Liao Chun-kai; Cheng Tsung-che; Lyle Lin; Gu Lin Ruei-yang; Liu Chih-jung; Wu Sheng-feng; Wang Yan-cheng; Shen Hao-wei; Wu Nien-ting; Lee Hao-yu; Chen Po-yu; Lin Yu-min; Cheng Hao-chun; Lai Po-wei; Yang Chen-yu; Wang Cheng-hao; Lin An-ko; Lin Li; Dai Pei-fong; Pan Wen-hui	Chan Cheuk Kiu; Ashley Ma; Mok Chun Lam; Andy Lo; Ansun Fung; Lee Ho Chi; Jordan Wen; Alexander Chan; Leung Chung Hei; Mok Chun Pui; Lam Lai Him; Cheng Hoi Ting; Tsang Kin Nam; York Sze; Matthew Andrew Holliday; Benny Tam; Sam Leung; Ryan Cheung; Connor Kwok; Leung Ho Nam; Yung Tsun Wai; Ng Yau Pang; Kenneth Chiu; Wong Yui Fung	Kazuya Shimokawa; Toshifumi Kaneko; Shoji Kitamura; Naoya Mochizuki; Hisaya Nammoku; Hiroki Nakagawa; Motoki Mukoyama; Jin Nakamura; Masashi Maruyama; Mizuki Kato; Yoshiki Fuchigami; Kisho Iwamoto; Makoto Hori; Yuki Katayama; Katsutoshi Satake; Shuichiro Kayo; Shunya Morita; Takehiro Tsujino; Kohei Sasagawa; Tatsuhiko Sato; Seifu Suzuki; Ryo Kinami; Ryuga Ihara; Junichi Tazawa
Laos	Philippines	Singapore	South Korea
Mung Chuevakham; Vansana Chansana; Mong Lee; Yayua Wa; Hue Thor; Bee Sengsoulin; Soulapixa Khounchaleun; Chinu Va; Yer Her; Youtthasat Herpaoyang; Choy Phiboualom; Yohanh Xayaphone; Souksumlary Phonthamard; Xaisana Thammavong; To Tava; Chounia Phothipanya; Natpakone Phialouanglath; Payia Wa	Jennald Pareja; Carlos Muñoz; Ben Sarmiento; Renato Samuel; Kyle Soberano; Junmar Diarao; Lord de Vera; Ignacio Escaño; Kennedy Torres; Vladimir Eguia; Clarence Caasalan; Erwin Bosito; Paulo Macasaet; Mark Steven Manaig; Adriane Bernardo; Romeo Jasmin; Jonhil Carreon; Raymond Nerosa; Alfredo De Guzman; Ferdinand Liguayan; Mark Beronilla; Jon-Jon Robles; Joshua Pineda; Harper Sy	Oscar Tay; Kohei Wong; Daniel Tam; Mikhail Ming Tan Sabri; Danis Azminin; Ody Tay; Eleazar Ng; Naeem Zahrin; Jared Ng; Edward Chuang; Joshua Aloysius Ang; Gideon Lim; Jeremy Chua; Hans Benno Pereira; Afi Idraki Niza; Ryota Wong; Ryan How; Baek In-jae; Shane Sebastian Lee; Aaron Toh; Sean Tan; Caleb Tan	Moon Dong-ju; Park Seong-han; Kim Hye-seong; Kim Ju-won; Roh Si-hwan; Kim Seong-yoon; Moon Bo-gyeong; Jang Hyun-seok; Jung Woo-young; Kim Young-kyu; Won Tae-in; Go Woo-suk; Park Se-woong; Kim Dong-heon; Kim Hyung-jun; Choi Won-jun; Choi Ji-min; Na Gyun-an; Gwak Been; Kang Baek-ho; Choi Ji-hoon; Kim Ji-chan; Park Yeong-hyun; Yoon Dong-hee
Thailand			
Naruephol Muangkasem; Nirawit Bunnam; Suepsak Somsuai; Sek Sitthikaew; Joe Daru; Sitthichok Aunmueang; Yodsaphan Saewa; Nutdanai Pingti; Phoomwut Wutthikorn; Siraphop Nadee; Setthawut Bucha; Kiattisak Chutongrat; Pakorn Chaikaew; Kittipong Thonglor; Anuchat Chanto; Jake Chaisongkram; Sakai Phraechai; Suppakorn Lin; Phongsathon Nituthon; Yotsaphol Artdee; Kevin Irwin; Yuthai Ryoto; Chanatip Thongbai			

== Results ==
All times are China Standard Time (UTC+08:00)

=== First stage ===
Pos	Team	Pld	W	L	RF	RA	PCT	GB	Qualification
1	Thailand	2	2	0	21	1	1.000	—	Second stage
2	Laos	2	1	1	9	11	.500	1	Second stage
3	Singapore	2	0	2	7	25	.000	2	

Source: OCA

26 September; 18:30	Laos	1–4	Thailand	Baseball & Softball Sports Center, Shaoxing; Umpires: Chen Te-jung (TPE)
26 September; 18:30	LP: Mung Chuevakham	Boxscore	WP: Siraphop Nadee	Baseball & Softball Sports Center, Shaoxing; Umpires: Chen Te-jung (TPE)

Team	1	2	3	4	5	6	7	8	9	R	H	E
Laos	0	0	0	0	0	0	1	0	0	1	2	5
Thailand	0	1	1	2	0	0	0	0	X	4	7	3

27 September; 18:30	Singapore	7–8	Laos	Baseball & Softball Sports Center, Shaoxing; Umpires: Wen Yu-chun (TPE)
27 September; 18:30	LP: Eleazar Ng	Boxscore	WP: Hue Thor	Baseball & Softball Sports Center, Shaoxing; Umpires: Wen Yu-chun (TPE)

Team	1	2	3	4	5	6	7	8	9	R	H	E
Singapore	0	2	0	0	0	2	2	1	0	7	11	2
Laos	0	0	2	0	1	5	0	0	X	8	5	4

28 September; 18:30	Thailand	17–0 (F/7)	Singapore	Baseball & Softball Sports Center, Shaoxing; Umpires: Chen Te-jung (TPE)
28 September; 18:30	WP: Siraphop Nadee	Boxscore	LP: Eleazar Ng	Baseball & Softball Sports Center, Shaoxing; Umpires: Chen Te-jung (TPE)

Team	1	2	3	4	5	6	7	8	9	R	H	E
Thailand	1	0	3	0	0	0	13	—	—	17	6	0
Singapore	0	0	0	0	0	0	0	—	—	0	1	0

=== Second stage ===
==== Group A ====
Pos	Team	Pld	W	L	RF	RA	PCT	GB	Qualification
1	China	3	3	0	18	0	1.000	—	Super round
2	Japan	3	2	1	24	1	.667	1	Super round
3	Philippines	3	1	2	7	8	.333	2	Placement round
4	Laos	3	0	3	0	40	.000	3	Placement round

Source: OCA

1 October; 12:00	Laos	0–15 (F/5)	China	Baseball & Softball Sports Center, Shaoxing; Umpires: Wen Yu-chun (TPE)
1 October; 12:00	LP: To Tava	Boxscore	WP: Su Changlong	Baseball & Softball Sports Center, Shaoxing; Umpires: Wen Yu-chun (TPE)

Team	1	2	3	4	5	6	7	8	9	R	H	E
Laos	0	0	0	0	0	—	—	—	—	0	2	3
China	2	4	0	0	9	—	—	—	—	15	11	0

1 October; 12:00	Japan	6–0	Philippines	Baseball & Softball Sports Center, Shaoxing; Umpires: Wang Tianyi (CHN)
1 October; 12:00	WP: Mizuki Kato	Boxscore	LP: Paulo Macasaet	Baseball & Softball Sports Center, Shaoxing; Umpires: Wang Tianyi (CHN)

Team	1	2	3	4	5	6	7	8	9	R	H	E
Japan	3	0	0	0	1	0	1	1	0	6	10	0
Philippines	0	0	0	0	0	0	0	0	0	0	3	0

2 October; 12:00	Philippines	0–2	China	Baseball & Softball Sports Center, Shaoxing; Umpires: Chen Te-jung (TPE)
2 October; 12:00	LP: Romeo Jasmin	Boxscore	WP: Li Ningji	Baseball & Softball Sports Center, Shaoxing; Umpires: Chen Te-jung (TPE)

Team	1	2	3	4	5	6	7	8	9	R	H	E
Philippines	0	0	0	0	0	0	0	0	0	0	2	3
China	0	0	0	0	0	1	1	0	X	2	4	0

2 October; 18:30	Laos	0–18 (F/5)	Japan	Baseball & Softball Sports Center, Shaoxing; Umpires: Cho Min-jun (KOR)
2 October; 18:30	LP: Soulapixa Khounchaleun	Boxscore	WP: Kisho Iwamoto; Sv: Yoshiki Fuchigami	Baseball & Softball Sports Center, Shaoxing; Umpires: Cho Min-jun (KOR)

Team	1	2	3	4	5	6	7	8	9	R	H	E
Laos	0	0	0	0	0	—	—	—	—	0	0	0
Japan	3	0	6	9	X	—	—	—	—	18	11	0

3 October; 18:30	China	1–0	Japan	Baseball & Softball Sports Center, Shaoxing; Umpires: Li Chih-hao (TPE)
3 October; 18:30	WP: Wang Xiang; Sv: Zheng Chaoqun	Boxscore	LP: Shunya Morita	Baseball & Softball Sports Center, Shaoxing; Umpires: Li Chih-hao (TPE)

Team	1	2	3	4	5	6	7	8	9	R	H	E
China	0	1	0	0	0	0	0	0	0	1	5	2
Japan	0	0	0	0	0	0	0	0	0	0	2	0

3 October; 18:30	Philippines	7–0	Laos	Baseball & Softball Sports Center, Shaoxing; Umpires: Lee Seung-chul (KOR)
3 October; 18:30	WP: Raymond Nerosa	Boxscore	LP: Mung Chuevakham	Baseball & Softball Sports Center, Shaoxing; Umpires: Lee Seung-chul (KOR)

Team	1	2	3	4	5	6	7	8	9	R	H	E
Philippines	2	1	1	1	0	1	0	0	1	7	12	2
Laos	0	0	0	0	0	0	0	0	0	0	3	3

==== Group B ====
Pos	Team	Pld	W	L	RF	RA	PCT	GB	Qualification
1	Chinese Taipei	3	3	0	31	1	1.000	—	Super round
2	South Korea	3	2	1	27	4	.667	1	Super round
3	Hong Kong	3	1	2	8	25	.333	2	Placement round
4	Thailand	3	0	3	1	37	.000	3	Placement round

Source: OCA

1 October; 18:30	Hong Kong	0–10 (F/8)	South Korea	Baseball & Softball Sports Center, Shaoxing; Umpires: Hironori Yoshino (JPN)
1 October; 18:30	LP: Leung Chung Hei	Boxscore	WP: Choi Ji-min	Baseball & Softball Sports Center, Shaoxing; Umpires: Hironori Yoshino (JPN)

Team	1	2	3	4	5	6	7	8	9	R	H	E
Hong Kong	0	0	0	0	0	0	0	0	—	0	2	3
South Korea	1	0	0	2	0	0	0	7	—	10	14	0

1 October; 18:30	Thailand	1–12 (F/7)	Chinese Taipei	Baseball & Softball Sports Center, Shaoxing; Umpires: Kim Dae-nam (KOR)
1 October; 18:30	LP: Suppakorn Lin	Boxscore	WP: Wu Sheng-feng	Baseball & Softball Sports Center, Shaoxing; Umpires: Kim Dae-nam (KOR)
1 October; 18:30		Boxscore	HR: Lin Li (1)	Baseball & Softball Sports Center, Shaoxing; Umpires: Kim Dae-nam (KOR)

Team	1	2	3	4	5	6	7	8	9	R	H	E
Thailand	1	0	0	0	0	0	0	—	—	1	5	3
Chinese Taipei	0	0	7	1	2	2	X	—	—	12	10	0

2 October; 12:00	Hong Kong	8–0	Thailand	Baseball & Softball Sports Center, Shaoxing; Umpires: Wu Ding (CHN)
2 October; 12:00	WP: Leung Chung Hei	Boxscore	LP: Siraphop Nadee	Baseball & Softball Sports Center, Shaoxing; Umpires: Wu Ding (CHN)

Team	1	2	3	4	5	6	7	8	9	R	H	E
Hong Kong	2	0	1	1	1	3	0	0	0	8	12	1
Thailand	0	0	0	0	0	0	0	0	0	0	3	5

2 October; 18:30	South Korea	0–4	Chinese Taipei	Baseball & Softball Sports Center, Shaoxing; Umpires: Shunichi Fukuzawa (JPN)
2 October; 18:30	LP: Moon Dong-ju	Boxscore	WP: Lin Yu-min	Baseball & Softball Sports Center, Shaoxing; Umpires: Shunichi Fukuzawa (JPN)

Team	1	2	3	4	5	6	7	8	9	R	H	E
South Korea	0	0	0	0	0	0	0	0	0	0	6	0
Chinese Taipei	1	0	0	1	0	0	0	2	X	4	7	0

3 October; 12:00	Chinese Taipei	15–0 (F/6)	Hong Kong	Baseball & Softball Sports Center, Shaoxing; Umpires: Masataka Mino (JPN)
3 October; 12:00	WP: Lai Po-wei	Boxscore	LP: Sam Leung	Baseball & Softball Sports Center, Shaoxing; Umpires: Masataka Mino (JPN)

Team	1	2	3	4	5	6	7	8	9	R	H	E
Chinese Taipei	2	0	2	1	5	5	—	—	—	15	9	1
Hong Kong	0	0	0	0	0	0	—	—	—	0	1	2

3 October; 12:00	Thailand	0–17 (F/5)	South Korea	Baseball & Softball Sports Center, Shaoxing; Umpires: Fan Jie (CHN)
3 October; 12:00	LP: Phoomwut Wutthikorn	Boxscore	WP: Na Gyun-an	Baseball & Softball Sports Center, Shaoxing; Umpires: Fan Jie (CHN)
3 October; 12:00		Boxscore	HR: Choi Ji-hoon (1), Yoon Dong-hee (1), Kim Ju-won (1)	Baseball & Softball Sports Center, Shaoxing; Umpires: Fan Jie (CHN)

Team	1	2	3	4	5	6	7	8	9	R	H	E
Thailand	0	0	0	0	0	—	—	—	—	0	4	2
South Korea	2	4	1	10	X	—	—	—	—	17	11	0

=== Placement round ===
- The results of the matches between the same teams that were already played during the second stage shall be taken into account for the placement round.

Pos	Team	Pld	W	L	RF	RA	PCT	GB
1	Philippines	3	3	0	23	2	1.000	—
2	Hong Kong	3	2	1	20	5	.667	1
3	Thailand	3	1	2	7	19	.333	2
4	Laos	3	0	3	0	24	.000	3

Source: OCA

5 October; 12:00	Laos	0–6	Thailand	Baseball & Softball Sports Center, Shaoxing; Umpires: Cheung Sui Man (HKG)
5 October; 12:00	LP: Yayua Wa	Boxscore	WP: Phoomwut Wutthikorn	Baseball & Softball Sports Center, Shaoxing; Umpires: Cheung Sui Man (HKG)

Team	1	2	3	4	5	6	7	8	9	R	H	E
Laos	0	0	0	0	0	0	0	0	0	0	2	2
Thailand	0	0	0	0	6	0	0	0	X	6	5	1

5 October; 18:30	Hong Kong	1–5	Philippines	Baseball & Softball Sports Center, Shaoxing; Umpires: Wang Tianyi (CHN)
5 October; 18:30	LP: Lam Lai Him	Boxscore	WP: Junmar Diarao; Sv: Romeo Jasmin	Baseball & Softball Sports Center, Shaoxing; Umpires: Wang Tianyi (CHN)

Team	1	2	3	4	5	6	7	8	9	R	H	E
Hong Kong	0	0	0	1	0	0	0	0	0	1	9	3
Philippines	2	0	0	0	0	0	2	1	X	5	7	0

6 October; 12:00	Thailand	1–11 (F/8)	Philippines	Baseball & Softball Sports Center, Shaoxing; Umpires: Hironori Yoshino (JPN)
6 October; 12:00	LP: Siraphop Nadee	Boxscore	WP: Kennedy Torres	Baseball & Softball Sports Center, Shaoxing; Umpires: Hironori Yoshino (JPN)

Team	1	2	3	4	5	6	7	8	9	R	H	E
Thailand	0	0	0	0	0	1	0	0	—	1	4	1
Philippines	3	0	2	3	0	0	2	1	—	11	17	0

6 October; 18:30	Laos	0–11 (F/7)	Hong Kong	Baseball & Softball Sports Center, Shaoxing; Umpires: Chen Te-jung (TPE)
6 October; 18:30	LP: Mung Chuevakham	Boxscore	WP: Sam Leung	Baseball & Softball Sports Center, Shaoxing; Umpires: Chen Te-jung (TPE)
6 October; 18:30		Boxscore	HR: York Sze (1)	Baseball & Softball Sports Center, Shaoxing; Umpires: Chen Te-jung (TPE)

Team	1	2	3	4	5	6	7	8	9	R	H	E
Laos	0	0	0	0	0	0	0	—	—	0	3	3
Hong Kong	0	2	7	0	2	0	X	—	—	11	9	1

=== Super round ===
- The results of the matches between the same teams that were already played during the second stage shall be taken into account for the super round.

Pos	Team	Pld	W	L	RF	RA	PCT	GB	Qualification
1	Chinese Taipei	3	2	1	8	3	.667 (Note: Head-to-head result: TPE 4–0 KOR.)	—	Gold medal match
2	South Korea	3	2	1	10	5	.667	—	Gold medal match
3	China	3	1	2	3	12	.333 (Note: Head-to-head result: CHN 1–0 JPN.)	1	Bronze medal match
4	Japan	3	1	2	2	3	.333	1	Bronze medal match

Source: OCA
Notes:

5 October; 12:00	Japan	0–2	South Korea	Baseball & Softball Sports Center, Shaoxing; Umpires: Wen Yu-chun (TPE)
5 October; 12:00	LP: Shuichiro Kayo	Boxscore	WP: Park Se-woong; Sv: Park Yeong-hyun	Baseball & Softball Sports Center, Shaoxing; Umpires: Wen Yu-chun (TPE)

Team	1	2	3	4	5	6	7	8	9	R	H	E
Japan	0	0	0	0	0	0	0	0	0	0	5	0
South Korea	0	0	0	0	0	1	0	1	X	2	6	1

5 October; 18:30	Chinese Taipei	4–1	China	Baseball & Softball Sports Center, Shaoxing; Umpires: Shunichi Fukuzawa (JPN)
5 October; 18:30	WP: Chen Po-yu; Sv: Gu Lin Ruei-yang	Boxscore	LP: Gan Quan	Baseball & Softball Sports Center, Shaoxing; Umpires: Shunichi Fukuzawa (JPN)

Team	1	2	3	4	5	6	7	8	9	R	H	E
Chinese Taipei	2	0	0	0	1	0	0	1	0	4	6	1
China	0	0	0	0	1	0	0	0	0	1	6	1

6 October; 12:00	South Korea	8–1	China	Baseball & Softball Sports Center, Shaoxing; Umpires: Li Chih-hao (TPE)
6 October; 12:00	WP: Won Tae-in	Boxscore	LP: Wang Weiyi	Baseball & Softball Sports Center, Shaoxing; Umpires: Li Chih-hao (TPE)
6 October; 12:00	HR: Kim Ju-won (1), Kang Baek-ho (1)	Boxscore		Baseball & Softball Sports Center, Shaoxing; Umpires: Li Chih-hao (TPE)

Team	1	2	3	4	5	6	7	8	9	R	H	E
South Korea	0	3	1	2	0	0	0	2	0	8	16	0
China	0	0	0	0	0	0	0	1	0	1	6	2

6 October; 18:30	Japan	2–0	Chinese Taipei	Baseball & Softball Sports Center, Shaoxing; Umpires: Cho Ji-hyun (KOR)
6 October; 18:30	WP: Yoshiki Fuchigami	Boxscore	LP: Wang Yan-cheng	Baseball & Softball Sports Center, Shaoxing; Umpires: Cho Ji-hyun (KOR)

Team	1	2	3	4	5	6	7	8	9	R	H	E
Japan	0	1	0	1	0	0	—	—	—	2	8	0
Chinese Taipei	0	0	0	0	0	0	—	—	—	0	3	1

- The game was stopped at the top of the 7th inning, due to heavy rains. The game was eventually called off after 60 minutes, with the score after 6 innings only taken into consideration.

=== Final round ===
==== Bronze medal match ====
7 October; 12:00	Japan	4–3	China	Baseball & Softball Sports Center, Shaoxing; Umpires: Kim Dae-nam (KOR)
7 October; 12:00	WP: Shuichiro Kayo; Sv: Katsutoshi Satake	Boxscore	LP: Wang Xiang	Baseball & Softball Sports Center, Shaoxing; Umpires: Kim Dae-nam (KOR)
7 October; 12:00		Boxscore	HR: Kou Yongkang (1)	Baseball & Softball Sports Center, Shaoxing; Umpires: Kim Dae-nam (KOR)

Team	1	2	3	4	5	6	7	8	9	R	H	E
Japan	0	2	0	0	0	0	0	2	0	4	6	0
China	1	0	2	0	0	0	0	0	0	3	7	2

==== Gold medal match ====
7 October; 18:00	South Korea	2–0	Chinese Taipei	Baseball & Softball Sports Center, Shaoxing; Umpires: Masataka Mino (JPN)
7 October; 18:00	WP: Moon Dong-ju; Sv: Go Woo-suk	Boxscore	LP: Lin Yu-min	Baseball & Softball Sports Center, Shaoxing; Umpires: Masataka Mino (JPN)

Team	1	2	3	4	5	6	7	8	9	R	H	E
South Korea	0	2	0	0	0	0	0	0	0	2	6	0
Chinese Taipei	0	0	0	0	0	0	0	0	0	0	5	0

== Final standing ==
Rank	Team	Pld	W	L
1st place, gold medalist(s)	South Korea	6	5	1
2nd place, silver medalist(s)	Chinese Taipei	6	4	2
3rd place, bronze medalist(s)	Japan	6	4	2
4	China	6	3	3
5	Philippines	5	3	2
6	Hong Kong	5	2	3
7	Thailand	7	3	4
8	Laos	7	1	6
9	Singapore	2	0	2
