= Jung Woo-young (baseball) =

South Korean baseball player (born 1999)

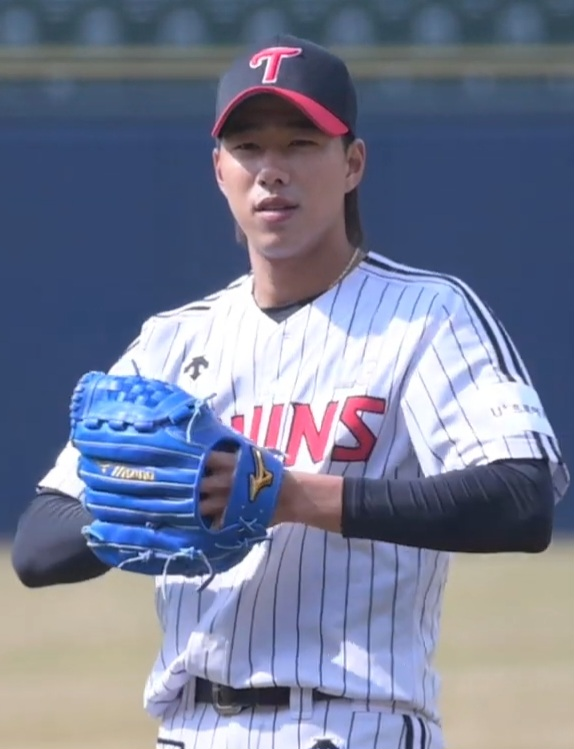

LG Twins – No. 18
- Pitcher
- Born: August 19, 1999 (age 26); Gapyeong County, Gyeonggi Province, South Korea
- Bats: Left Throws: Right

KBO debut
- March 24, 2019, for the LG Twins

KBO statistics (through 2025)
- Win–loss record: 7–7
- Earned run average: 2.81
- Strikeouts: 157
- Stats at Baseball Reference

Teams
- LG Twins (2019–present)

Career highlights and awards
- KBO Rookie of the Year (2019)
Medals
Men's baseball
Representing South Korea
Asian Games
Gold medal – first place	2022 Hangzhou	Team

Jung Woo-young (Korean: 정우영; born August 19, 1999) is a South Korean professional baseball player for the LG Twins of the KBO League. He won the KBO League Rookie of the Year Award in 2019.

== Career ==
Kim appeared in two baseball contests during the 2022 Asian Games, and winning a gold medal for South Korea.

He represented the South Korea national baseball team at the 2023 World Baseball Classic.
