= Kim Hyeong-jun (disambiguation) =

Kim Hyeong-jun, Kim Hyung-joon or Kim Hyong-jun (김형준) is the name of:

- Kim Hyong-jun (born 1949), North Korean diplomat
- Jonathan Kim (born 1960), South Korean film producer
- Kim Hyeong-jun (born 1968), South Korean film director
- Kim Hyung-jun (born 1987), South Korean singer
- Kim Hyung-jun (baseball) (born 1999), South Korean baseball player
