= Kim Seong-yoon =

Kim Seong-yoon may refer to:

- Kim Seong-yoon (baseball)
- Kim Seong-yoon (director)
