= Choi Won-jun =

South Korean baseball player (born 1997)

KT Wiz – No. 3
- Outfielder
- Born: March 23, 1997 (age 29); Gwangmyeong, Gyeonggi Province, South Korea
- Bats: Left Throws: Right

KBO debut
- May 31, 2016, for the Kia Tigers

KBO statistics (through 2025 season)
- Batting average: .279
- Home runs: 31
- Runs batted in: 283
- Stats at Baseball Reference

Teams
- Kia Tigers (2017–2025); Sangmu Phoenix (2022–2023); NC Dinos (2025); KT Wiz (2026–present)
Medals
Men's baseball
Representing South Korea
Asian Games
Gold medal – first place	2022 Hangzhou	Team
U-18 Baseball World Cup
Gold medal – first place	2015 Osaka	Team
U-18 Asian Baseball Championship
Gold medal – first place	2014 Bangkok	Team

Choi Won-jun (Korean: 최원준; born March 23, 1997) is a South Korean professional baseball outfielder for the KT Wiz of the KBO League. He appeared in baseball contest during the 2022 Asian Games, winning a gold medal for South Korea.
