= Park Seong-han =

South Korean baseball player (born 1998)

SSG Landers – No. 2
- Infielder
- Born: March 30, 1998 (age 28); Suncheon, South Jeolla Province, South Korea
- Bats: Left Throws: Right

KBO debut
- September 30, 2017, for the SK Wyverns

KBO statistics (through 2025 season)
- Batting average: .283
- Home runs: 34
- Runs batted in: 272
- Stats at Baseball Reference

Teams
- SK Wyverns/SSG Landers (2017–present)

Career highlights and awards
- KBO All-Star (2022); Korean Series champion (2022); KBO Defensive Award (2026)
Medals
Men's baseball
Representing South Korea
Asian Games
Gold medal – first place	2022 Hangzhou	Team

Park Seong-han (Korean: 박성한; born March 30, 1998) is a South Korean professional baseball outfielder currently playing for the SSG Landers of the KBO League. He appeared in baseball contest during the 2022 Asian Games, winning a gold medal for South Korea.
