= Kim Young-kyu (baseball) =

South Korean baseball player (born 2000)

NC Dinos – No. 17
- Pitcher
- Born: February 10, 2000 (age 26); Damyang County, South Jeolla Province, South Korea
- Bats: Left Throws: Left

KBO debut
- March 27, 2019, for the NC Dinos

KBO statistics (through 2025 season)
- Win–loss record: 24–25
- Earned run average: 4.21
- Strikeouts: 320
- Stats at Baseball Reference

Teams
- NC Dinos (2018–present)
Medals
Men's baseball
Representing South Korea
Asian Games
Gold medal – first place	2022 Hangzhou	Team

Kim Young-kyu (Korean: 김영규; born February 10, 2000) is a South Korean professional baseball pitcher currently playing for the NC Dinos of the KBO League.

== Career ==
He appeared in one baseball contests during the 2022 Asian Games, and won a gold medal for South Korea.

He represented the South Korea national baseball team at the 2026 World Baseball Classic.
