= Park Se-woong =

South Korean baseball player (born 1995)

Lotte Giants – No. 21
- Starting pitcher
- Born: November 30, 1995 (age 30); South Korea
- Bats: Right Throws: Right

KBO debut
- April 1, 2015, for the KT Wiz

KBO statistics (through July 22, 2026)
- Win–loss record: 79–96
- Earned run average: 4.56
- Strikeouts: 1,208
- Stats at Baseball Reference

Teams
- KT Wiz (2015); Lotte Giants (2015–present)

- Park Se-woong
- Hangul: 박세웅
- Hanja: 朴世雄
- RR: Bak Seung
- MR: Pak Seung

Park Se-woong (Korean: 박세웅; born November 30, 1995) is a South Korean starting pitcher who plays for the Lotte Giants in the KBO League. He throws right-handed. He was selected by the kt Wiz in the 2014 Draft and made his KBO debut in 2015 before being traded to the Giants.

== Professional career ==
Park was selected by the expansion team kt Wiz in the 2014 Draft (held in 2013). He played in the KBO Futures League in 2014 and was on the opening day roster of the 2015 kt Wiz, before being traded to the Lotte Giants. After two seasons, Park became one of the best starting pitchers in the KBO in 2017.

He was selected to represent South Korea at the 2017 Asia Professional Baseball Championship, and started the final against Japan. He was the losing pitcher in a game he pitched 3+ innings and allowed one earned run.

In 2018, he didn't prepare properly for the season due to elbow injuries and won one game in 14 games, with a 9.92 earned run average (ERA). After the season, he underwent a bone removal operation on his elbow.

In 2019, he returned in June and had a 4.20 ERA in 12 games. He recovered his pre-injury form and showed better performance in the second half, making him look forward to next season.

In 2020, he became a starting pitcher, replacing Noh Kyung-eun. Although he continued his sluggish performance in the first half without showing the performance of the exhibition game in the early stages, he was hidden by So Hyung-joon and Koo Chang-mo, but he showed performance in the top five fingers among the native starters in the league. At the beginning of the season, when the control of the four-seam was not good, he showed a new pitching pattern that lowered his BB/9 to two points by increasing the ratio of changeups and two-seam pitching in the past. In addition, he played his first full-time starting rotation after returning from injury, proving his health without any side effects, and being sluggish at the beginning of the season and then improving in the second half of the season seemed to see Song Seung-joon in the past when he was Royster. By late August and early September, his ERA was 4.18 and he was second in domestic selection. His performance declined in October.
