= Choi Ji-min =

South Korean baseball player (born 2003)

Kia Tigers – No. 39
- Pitcher
- Born: September 10, 2003 (age 23); Gangneung, Gangwon Province, South Korea
- Bats: Left Throws: Left

KBO debut
- April 22, 2022, for the Kia Tigers

KBO statistics (through 2026)
- Win–loss record: 1–0
- Earned run average: 7.50
- Strikeouts: 29
- Stats at Baseball Reference

Teams
- Kia Tigers (2022–present)
Medals
Men's baseball
Representing South Korea
Asian Games
Gold medal – first place	2022 Hangzhou	Team

Choi Ji-min (Korean: 최지민; born September 10, 2003) is a South Korean professional baseball pitcher for the Kia Tigers of the KBO League. He appeared in four baseball contests during the 2022 Asian Games, and won a gold medal for South Korea.
