= Na Gyun-an =

South Korean baseball player (born 1998)

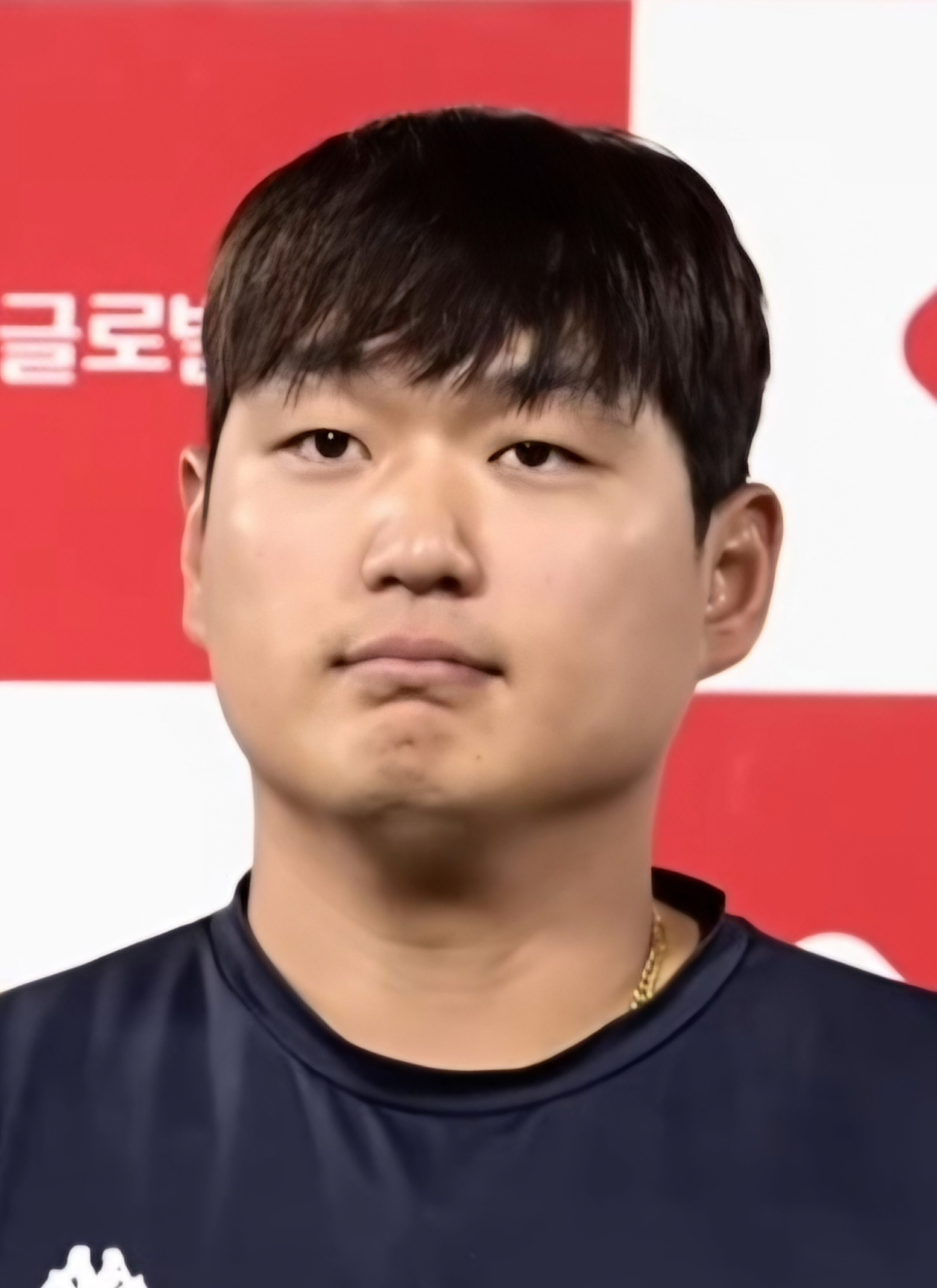

Lotte Giants – No. 43
- Catcher / Pitcher
- Born: March 16, 1998 (age 28); Changwon, South Gyeongsang Province, South Korea
- Bats: Right Throws: Right

KBO debut
- March 24, 2017, for the Lotte Giants

KBO statistics (through July 8, 2024)
- Win–loss record: 12–25
- Earned run average: 5.10
- Strikeouts: 320
- Stats at Baseball Reference

Teams
- Lotte Giants (2017–present)
Medals
Men's baseball
Representing South Korea
Asian Games
Gold medal – first place	2022 Hangzhou	Team

Na Gyun-an (Korean: 나균안; born March 16, 1998) is a South Korean professional baseball player for the Lotte Giants of the KBO League. Na appeared in one baseball contest during the 2022 Asian Games, and winning a gold medal for South Korea.
