= Lyle Lin =

Taiwanese baseball player (born 1997)

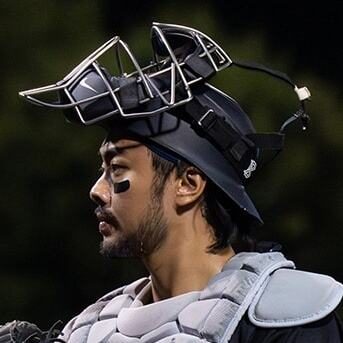
- Lin with the Southern Maryland Blue Crabs in 2025

Hokkaido Nippon-Ham Fighters – No. 38
- Catcher
- Born: 26 June 1997 (age 29); Taipei County, Taiwan
- Bats: Right Throws: Right
- Stats at Baseball Reference
Medals
Representing Chinese Taipei
Men's baseball
WBSC Premier12
Gold medal – first place	2024 Tokyo	Team
Asian Games
Silver medal – second place	2022 Hangzhou	Team

Lyle Lin
- Chinese: 林家正
Transcriptions
Standard Mandarin
- Wade–Giles: Lin^{2} Chia^{1}-cheng^{4}

Lin Chia-cheng (Chinese: 林家正; Wade–Giles: Lin^{2} Chia^{1}-cheng^{4}; born 26 June 1997), also known as Lyle Lin, is a Taiwanese professional baseball catcher for the Hokkaido Nippon-Ham Fighters of Nippon Professional Baseball (NPB). He became the first Taiwanese-born player to be drafted by a Major League Baseball (MLB) team in 2016 and the first to join an MLB team through the draft in 2019.

Born in Taipei County (now New Taipei), Taiwan, Lin moved to California to attend high school. He was recruited to play baseball at Arizona State University (ASU) before being drafted by and signing with the Arizona Diamondbacks.

== Amateur career ==
Lin started playing baseball in third grade. He attended Er-Chong Junior High School and Ku-Pao Home Economics and Commercial High School in New Taipei City. In his junior high school years, he was a utility player at first base, second base, catcher, and even pitcher. As a pitcher, his fastball reached 130 kilometers per hour (80.8 mph).

After his sister moved to the United States to study at the University of California, Santa Barbara, Lin followed suit and moved to San Juan Capistrano, California, for high school in 2013. He did not speak much English at the time and attended JSerra Catholic High School.

In 2016, Lin was named a Rawlings-Perfect Game honorable mention All-American. That year, he was drafted by the Seattle Mariners in the 16th round, becoming the first Taiwanese-born player to be a major league draft pick, but chose to go on to college.

Lin was recruited by the Arizona State Sun Devils and described the day Arizona State (ASU) reached out as the "best moment ever," citing his desire to play NCAA Division I baseball and get a good education. In his freshman season, Lin batted .290, totaling 61 hits, 9 doubles, 1 triple and 2 home runs. The next year, he batted .312 with 2 home runs and 18 RBIs. In 2017, he played collegiate summer baseball with the Bourne Braves of the Cape Cod Baseball League. In 2018, Lin was drafted by the Houston Astros in the 29th round and decided to return to ASU.

In 2019, as a junior, he was the team's designated hitter. He batted .299 with 9 home runs and 50 RBIs. In a game against the UC Davis Aggies, Lin became the first Sun Devil to hit a grand slam since 2014. He was one of four Sun Devils to be named a first team selection on the All-Pac-12 team. He majored in international business at ASU.

== Professional career ==
=== Arizona Diamondbacks ===
Lin was selected by the Arizona Diamondbacks in the 14th round, with the 422nd overall pick, of the 2019 Major League Baseball draft. He signed with the Diamondbacks and became the first Taiwanese player to enter Major League Baseball through the draft, with a signing bonus of US$125,000. He made his professional debut with the Low-A Hillsboro Hops, hitting .205/.274/.223 with eight RBI over 31 games. Lin did not play in a game in 2020 due to the cancellation of the minor league season because of the COVID-19 pandemic.

Lin returned to action in 2021 with the Single-A Visalia Rawhide and Double-A Amarillo Sod Poodles, playing in 55 total games and slashing .222/.322/.298 with one home run and 17 RBI. He split the 2022 season between Hillsboro, Amarillo, and the Triple-A Reno Aces. In 42 appearances for the three affiliates, Lin batted .183/.255/.204 with no home runs and 15 RBI.

Lin briefly spent time in Australia with the Auckland Tuatara as he rehabilitated a hand injury. On March 22, 2023, Lin was released by the Diamondbacks organization in order to pursue a contract from a different team.

=== Toronto Blue Jays ===
On April 10, 2023, Lin signed a minor league contract with the Toronto Blue Jays organization. He played 28 games for the High-A Vancouver Canadians, batting .214/.333/.286 with one home run and six RBI. Lin elected free agency following the season on November 6.

=== Arizona Diamondbacks (second stint) ===
On February 8, 2024, Lin returned to the Arizona Diamondbacks organization on a minor league contract. He played in only 20 games on the year for the High-A Hillsboro Hops and Double-A Amarillo Sod Poodles, batting .368/.438/.491 with one home run and eight RBI. Lin elected free agency following the season on November 4.

=== Athletics ===
On February 17, 2025, Lin announced that he had signed a minor league contract with the Athletics and was invited to the team's spring training facilities in Phoenix. In 32 appearances for the Double-A Midland Rockhounds, Lin batted .183/.284/.204 with nine RBI and one stolen base. He was released by the Athletics organization on July 28.

=== Southern Maryland Blue Crabs ===
On August 5, 2025, Lin announced on Facebook that he had signed with the Southern Maryland Blue Crabs of the Atlantic League of Professional Baseball. Lin made 22 appearances for Southern Maryland, batting .153/.244/.167 with four RBI.

=== Hokkaido Nippon-Ham Fighters ===
On March 2, 2026, Lin signed with the High Point Rockers of the Atlantic League of Professional Baseball. However, on March 12, 2026, the Hokkaido Nippon-Ham Fighters announced they reached an agreement with Lin. He will wear the number 38.

== International career ==
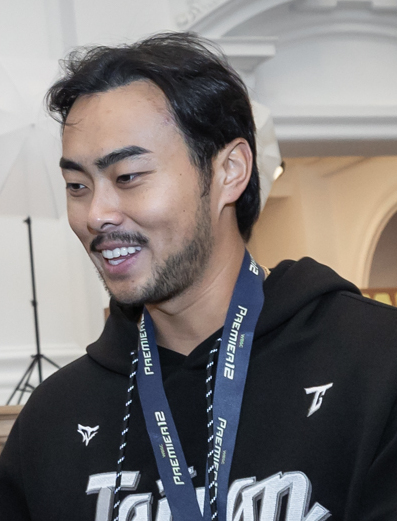
Lin in 2024

In 2016, manager Kuo Lee Chien-fu invited Lin to play on the Taiwanese national U-23 baseball team, but Lin forwent the opportunity due to injuries and scheduling with school.

Lin was selected to play on the Taiwanese national team in the 2022 Asian Games in Hangzhou, China, where the team earned a silver medal.

In 2024, Lin again represented Taiwan in the 2024 WBSC Premier12 tournament. His selection provoked controversy, because he was still recovering from an injury on his left hand and had not competed in a baseball game in over a month. He hit the go-ahead solo home run off Shosei Togo in the championship game against Japan.

Lin was named on Taiwan's 36-man training roster for the 2026 World Baseball Classic qualifiers. After signing with the Athletics, he announced his withdrawal from the national team. He urged his fans to continue supporting the team, writing, "I am proud to be a part of Team Taiwan. We are Team Taiwan." Lin was rostered for the 2026 World Baseball Classic. Stuart Fairchild credited Lin with convincing him to join Taiwan for the tournament.
