= Wang Weiyi =

Wang Weiyi can refer to:

- Wang Weiyi (physician) (王惟一, 987-1067), Chinese physician
- Wang Weiyi (filmmaker) (王为一, 1912—2013), Chinese film director and screenwriter
- Wang Weiyi (biathlete) (born 1967), Chinese biathlete
- Wang Weiyi (sport shooter) (王炜一, born 1974), Chinese sport shooter
- Wang Weiyi (volleyball) (born 1995), Chinese volleyball player
