= Moon Bo-gyeong =

South Korean baseball player (born 2000)

LG Twins – No. 2
- Infielder
- Born: July 19, 2000 (age 26); Seoul, South Korea
- Bats: Left Throws: Right

KBO debut
- May 1, 2021, for the LG Twins

KBO statistics (through 2025 season)
- Batting average: .289
- Home runs: 73
- Runs batted in: 376
- Stats at Baseball Reference

Teams
- LG Twins (2019–present)
Medals
Men's baseball
Representing South Korea
Asian Games
Gold medal – first place	2022 Hangzhou	Team

Moon Bo-gyeong (Korean: 문보경; born July 19, 2000) is a South Korean professional baseball infielder for the LG Twins of the KBO League. He appeared in baseball contest during the 2022 Asian Games, winning a gold medal for South Korea.

== International career ==
Moon's two-run homer over Australia at the 2026 World Baseball Classic propelled the national team to its first quarterfinal appearance in 17 years. Moon also set WBC's first-round RBI record.

== Public image ==
Moon's popularity in South Korea gained him the nicknames "Jamsil Arena's Park Bo-gum" and "Moon Bo-mul" which translates to "Moon Treasure" in English.
