= Ko Young-pyo =

South Korean baseball player (born 1991)

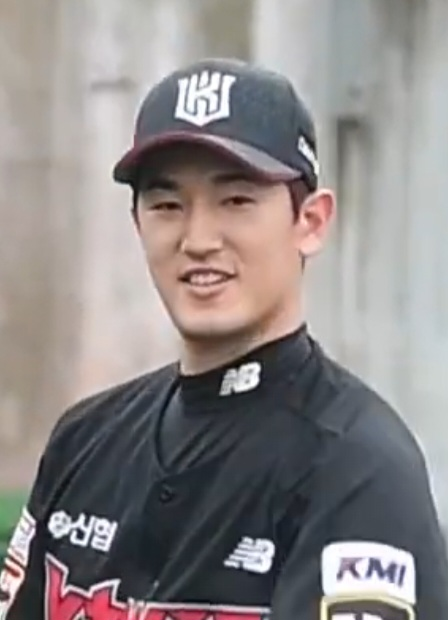

KT Wiz – No. 1
- Pitcher
- Born: September 16, 1991 (age 35); Naju, South Korea
- Bats: Right Throws: Right

KBO debut
- March 28, 2015, for the KT Wiz

Career statistics (through April 2, 2024)
- Win–loss record: 70-62
- Earned run average: 3.96
- Strikeouts: 967
- Stats at Baseball Reference

Teams
- KT Wiz (2015–present)

Career highlights and awards
- Korean Series champion (2021); KBO Awards - Win Award (2026)

Ko Young-pyo (Korean: 고영표; born September 16, 1991) is a South Korean pitcher for the KT Wiz in the KBO League.

== Career ==
=== KT Wiz ===
Ko was drafted by the KT Wiz in the 2nd round of the 2013 KBO Draft. He debuted against the Lotte Giants on March 28, 2015, where he pitched for 1 inning and gave up 2 runs.

== International career ==
Ko was selected to play in the 2023 World Baseball Classic for South Korea by manager Lee Kang-chul, where he gave up 2 runs across 4.1 innings including a home run by Tim Kennelly against Australia. South Korea later went on to lose the game 8–7. South Korea were eliminated from the group stage. Ko was also selected for South Korea to play in the 2024 WBSC Premier12, where he appeared in 2 games against Chinese Taipei and Australia, losing 1 game, giving up 6 runs over 5.2 innings and recording 4 strikeouts. South Korea were knocked out of the competition after the Opening Round after 3 wins and 2 losses.
