= Nien-Ting Wu =

Taiwanese baseball player (born 1993)

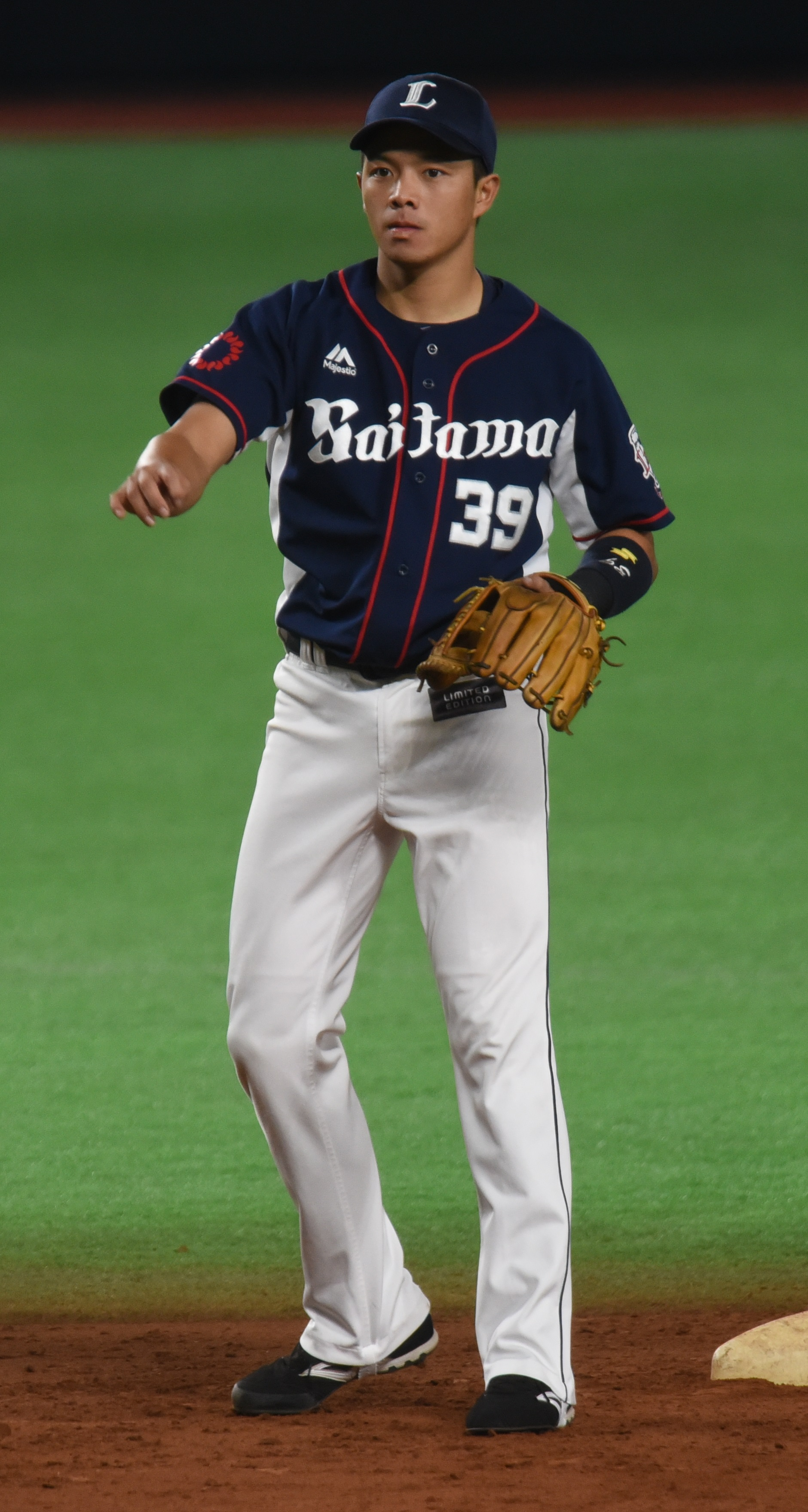

TSG Hawks – No. 39
- Infielder
- Born: June 7, 1993 (age 32); Taipei, Taiwan
- Bats: Left Throws: Right

Professional debut
- NPB: July 10, 2016, for the Saitama Seibu Lions
- CPBL: July 1, 2024, for the TSG Hawks

NPB statistics (through 2023 season)
- Batting average: .224
- Home runs: 16
- Runs batted in: 108

CPBL statistics (through April 16, 2026)
- Batting average: .307
- Home runs: 4
- Runs batted in: 63
- Stats at Baseball Reference

Teams
- Saitama Seibu Lions (2016–2023); TSG Hawks (2024–present)
Medals
Men's baseball
Representing Chinese Taipei
Asian Games
Silver medal – second place	2022 Hangzhou	Team

Nien-Ting Wu (Chinese: 呉念庭; born June 7, 1993) is a Taiwanese professional baseball infielder for the TSG Hawks of the Chinese Professional Baseball League (CPBL). He has previously played in Nippon Professional Baseball (NPB) for the Saitama Seibu Lions.

== Career ==
=== Saitama Seibu Lions ===
Wu made his NPB debut for the Saitama Seibu Lions on July 10, 2016 as the starting shortstop against the Orix Buffaloes. Wu went 1-for-4 with a strikeout. The Lions lost the game 8-2.

In 2023, Wu played in 41 games for the Lions, batting .205/.319/.295 with one home run and 11 RBI. On December 1, 2023, Wu announced that he would be leaving the NPB to pursue other opportunities in Taiwan.

=== XPORTS ===
On January 11, 2024, Wu signed with XPORTS, a team in Taiwan's industrial baseball league, with the intention to enter the 2024 CPBL mid–season draft.

=== TSG Hawks ===
On June 28, 2024, Wu was drafted by the TSG Hawks with their first–round selection of the 2024 CPBL mid–season draft.

== International career ==
He was selected to play for the Chinese Taipei national baseball team in the 2023 World Baseball Classic. Later that year, Wu appeared in the postponed 2022 Asian Games, competing in six baseball games, batting .286/.429/.476 in 14 at-bats, and winning a silver medal with Chinese Taipei.
