= Pingtan, Yuechi County =

Pingtan 坪滩镇
- Town
- Location in Sichuan
- Coordinates: 30°29′32″N 106°12′0″E
- Country: People's Republic of China
- Province: Sichuan
- Prefecture-level city: Guang'an
- County: Yuechi County
- Time zone: UTC+8 (China Standard)

Pingtan (Chinese: 坪滩; pinyin: Píngtān) is a town in Yuechi County, Sichuan province, China. As of 2020, it administers three residential neighborhoods and 18 villages:

Neighborhoods

- Xingping Community (兴坪社区)
- Yuejiang Community (越江社区)
- Jialing Community (嘉陵社区)

Villages

- Wulangmiao Village (五郎庙村)
- Lujiaqiao Village (陆家桥村)
- Majiagou Village (马家沟村)
- Cheduhe Village (扯渡河村)
- Shuanghekou Village (双河口村)
- Jiaodingpo Village (轿顶坡村)
- Ma'anzhai Village (马鞍寨村)
- Qilongzhai Village (七龙寨村)
- Renhezhai Village (仁和寨村)
- Dikeng Village (低坑村)
- Shichuangou Village (石船沟村)
- Lianhua Village (莲花村)
- Baohua Village (保华村)
- Shipanyan Village (石盘堰村)
- Liaojie'an Village (了解庵村)
- Baishatuo Village (白沙坨村)
- Fuxingsi Village (福兴寺村)
- Baiyanggai Village (白羊盖村)

== See also ==
- List of township-level divisions of Sichuan
