= Kim Seong-yoon (baseball) =

South Korean baseball player (born 1999)

Samsung Lions – No. 39
- Outfielder
- Born: February 2, 1999 (age 27); South Korea
- Bats: Left Throws: Left

KBO debut
- June 4, 2017, for the Samsung Lions

KBO statistics (through June 29, 2025)
- Batting average: .300
- Home runs: 6
- Runs batted in: 69
- Stats at Baseball Reference

Teams
- Samsung Lions (2017–present)

Career highlights and awards
- Korean Series champion (2026); 2× KBO Defensive Award (2025–2026); 4× Real Glove Award (2017–2018, 2020–2021)
Medals
Representing South Korea
Men's Baseball
Gold medal – first place	2022 Hangzhou	Team

- Kim Seong-yoon
- Hangul: 김성윤
- Hanja: 金盛閏
- RR: Gim Seongyun
- MR: Kim Sŏngyun

Kim Seong-yoon (also transliterated as Kim Sung-yoon, born February 2, 1999) is a South Korean professional baseball outfielder for the Samsung Lions of the KBO League. At 5 ft 4 in (1.63 m), he over-took Kim Sun-bin of Kia Tigers, who stands at 5 ft 5 in (1.65 m), to be the shortest player in the KBO when he debuted for the Lions in 2017. He is 4 in (20 cm) shorter than the average players in KBO and tied with Daichi Mizuguchi of Seibu Lions to be the shortest among Major League Baseball (MLB), Nippon Professional Baseball (NPB), and KBO players. In 2020, Kim was joined by fellow Samsung Lions second baseman Kim Ji-chan, who also stands at 5 ft 4 in (1.63 m).

== Career ==
=== Samsung Lions ===
Kim joined the Samsung Lions as a fourth round, 39th overall draft pick in 2017, right after graduating from Posco High School. In his sixth KBO game, against the SK Wyverns, Kim hit a two-run home run despite never hitting any home run in his high school career.

In 2023, he had a career-high batting average of .314 and 18 steals.

=== International ===
Kim appeared in six baseball contests during the 2022 Asian Games, batting .222/.278/.333 in 18 at-bats, and winning a gold medal for South Korea.
