= Pingtan, Neijiang =

Pingtan 平坦镇
- Town
- Location in Sichuan
- Coordinates: 29°36′30″N 105°17′56″E
- Country: People's Republic of China
- Province: Sichuan
- Prefecture-level city: Neijiang
- District: Dongxing District
- Time zone: UTC+8 (China Standard)

Pingtan (Chinese: 平坦; pinyin: Píngtǎn) is a town in Dongxing District, Neijiang, Sichuan province, China. As of 2020, it administers Pingtan Residential Community (平滩社区) and the following nine villages:

- Chengxin Village (成新村)
- Shili Village (十里村)
- Qingliang Village (清凉村)
- Lizi Village (利子村)
- Baijia Village (白家村)
- Baota Village (宝塔村)
- Shaiyu Village (晒鱼村)
- Shuili Village (水梨村)
- Lanjia Village (兰家村)

== See also ==
- List of township-level divisions of Sichuan
