= Wang Weiyi (physician) =

Chinese physician and writer

- Chinese: 王惟一
Transcriptions
Standard Mandarin
- Hanyu Pinyin: Wáng wéiyī

Wang Weide
- Chinese: 王惟德
Transcriptions
Standard Mandarin
- Hanyu Pinyin: Wáng Wéidé

Wang Weiyi (pinyin: Wáng wéiyī; 987–1067), also known as Wang Weide (王惟德), was a Chinese physician and writer of the Song dynasty. He was as an expert on acupuncture famous for creating bronze figure models and compiling a book on the subject. He was the imperial physician of two emperors: Renzong and Yingzong.

== Career ==
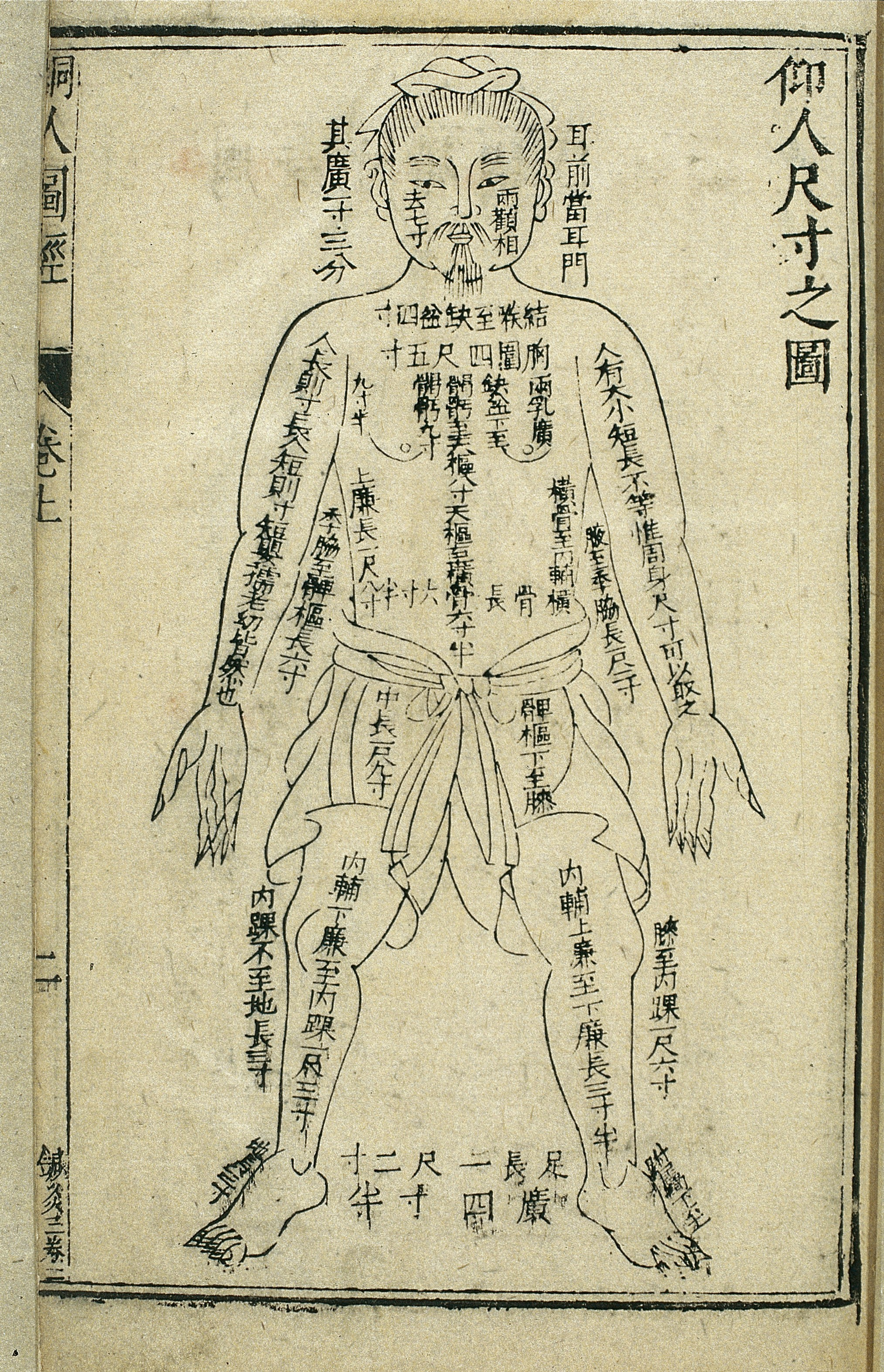
Woodcut from a 1443 (Ming dynasty) edition of Wang Weiyi's book.

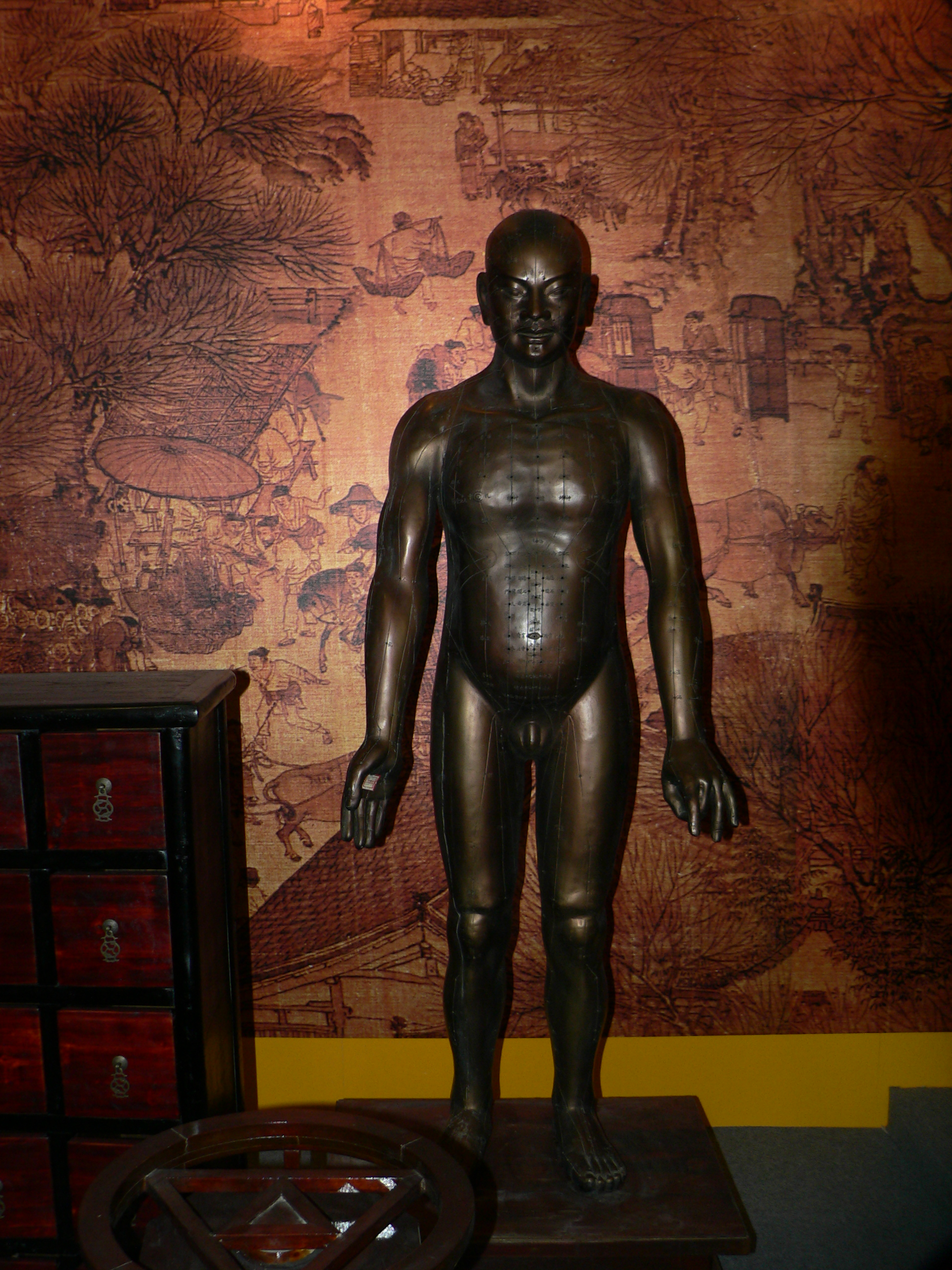
A later bronze figure inspired by the Song dynasty original.

Wang Weiyi was a chief physician at the Hanlin Academy, held the title of Chaosan Dafu (朝散大夫) and a post in the Department of the Palace (殿中省). From 1026, by an imperial edict, he presided over the works on forging two bronze acupuncture models (针灸铜人) and editing of a book on the subject, the three-volume Tongren Shuxue Zhenjiu Tujing (Illustrated Manual of Acupuncture Points on a Bronze Figure; 铜人腧穴针灸图经). (Note: Later editors extended it to five volumes. The book, in its Yuan dynasty edition, is available at the World Digital Library website: "The Newly Illustrated Manual of Acupuncture Points on a Bronze Figure". 1280.)

Acupuncture has been known since at least several centuries prior, and body models were being created earlier too (e.g. lacquer figurines excavated from a Han dynasty tomb), but the ones created by Wang Weiyi were much more precise and of human size. They are sometimes called Tiansheng Bronze Figures (天聖銅人; 天圣铜人) after the era name in which they were constructed. (Note: Tiansheng era of Emperor Renzong's reign lasted between 1023 and 1032 (traditional Chinese: 天聖; simplified Chinese: 天圣; pinyin: Tiānshèng)) The two man-sized bronze figures were designed with care about the actual human body proportion. They were engraved with 354 acupoints – 4 millimeter deep, marked with names and connected according to the twelve meridians. The limbs were movable and disassemblable. Inside the bronze trunk, there were internal organs and skeleton made of wood. Replacing paper models with this three-dimensional apparatus was a great improvement in teaching and examination: the outside of the bronze statue was first covered with wax to seal the acupoints and water (or mercury) was poured inside the dummy. If the needle was inserted by the examinee into the correct acupoint, water or mercury would ooze out.

Wang also participated in the revision of a Han dynasty classic medical work, The Yellow Emperor's Canon of Eighty-One Difficult Issues.

In 1030, he overlooked engraving of his treatise on stone tablets placed in a temple in Kaifeng (the capital of the empire, that time known as Bianjing, 汴京).

Wang Weiyi's achievements re-enabled the development and popularization of acupuncture, which has been in decline since the Tang dynasty physician Wang Xi discouraged its use.

== Modern depictions ==
A 2014 film produced by CCTV6 (Note: The full film is available on CCTV6's official YouTube channel: "《天下第一针》". YouTube.) and directed by Fang Junliang, Master of Needles (天下第一针), depicts Wang Weiyi's life, with actor Zhai Xiaoxing in the main role.
