= South Korea national baseball team =

Information
- Country: South Korea
- Federation: Korea Baseball Softball Association
- Confederation: Baseball Federation of Asia
- Manager: (South Korea) Ryu Ji-hyun (2025–present)
- Captain: Jung Hoo Lee
- Team Colors: Navy Blue, White, Light Blue, Blue, Red

WBSC ranking
- Current: 5 ▼1 (18 November 2026)
- Highest: 2 (first in August 2021)
- Lowest: 8 (first in December 2014)

Uniforms

Olympic Games
- Appearances: 4 (first in 1996)
- Best result: Gold: 1 - 2008

World Baseball Classic
- Appearances: 6 (first in 2006)
- Best result: (silver) 2nd (2009)

WBSC Premier12
- Appearances: 3 (first in 2015)
- Best result: (gold) 1st (1 time, in 2015)

World Cup
- Appearances: 14 (first in 1976)
- Best result: 1st (1982)

Intercontinental Cup
- Appearances: 14 (first in 1975)
- Best result: 1st (1977)

Asian Games
- Appearances: 8 (first in 1994)
- Best result: 1st (7: 1998, 2002, 2010, 2014, 2018, 2023, 2026)

Asian Championship
- Appearances: 27 (first in 1954)
- Best result: 1st (8: 1963, 1971, 1975, 1983, 1989, 1997, 1999, 2015)

The South Korean national baseball team (Korean: 대한민국 야구 국가대표팀), also known as the Blue Wave (Korean: 푸른물결), is the national baseball team of South Korea. It has participated in every edition of the World Baseball Classic (WBC), reaching the finals in 2009, and won the WBSC Premier12 in 2015. South Korea also hosted and won the Baseball World Cup in 1982, and has participated in several Summer Olympic Games (winning gold over Cuba in 2008).

Currently, South Korean baseball is ranked fifth in the WBSC World Rankings. South Korea's main rival is Japan, which it has met in several WBC, Olympic, and Asian Baseball Championship games.

== History ==
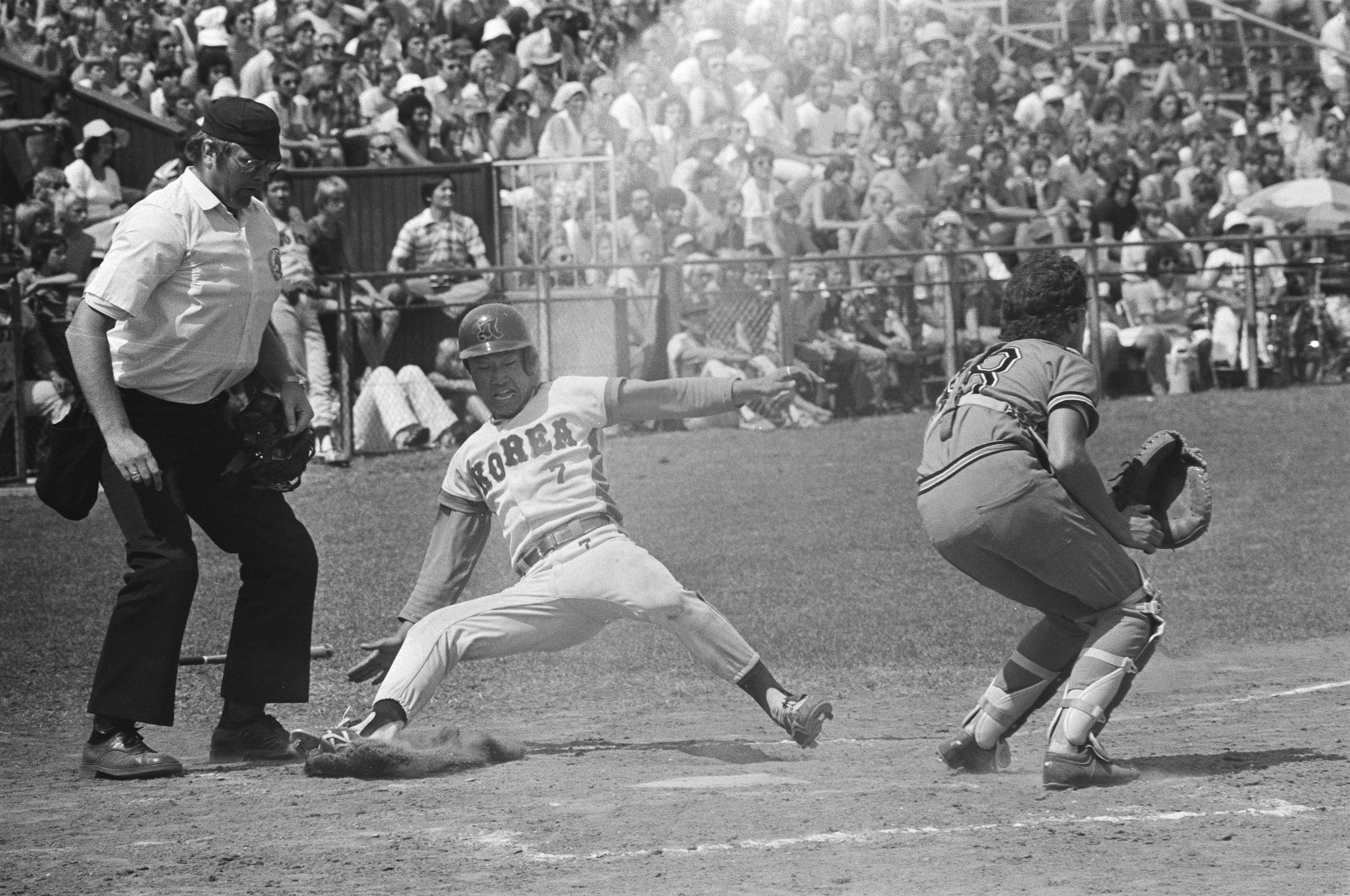
Kim Jae-bak scores for South Korea at the 1976 Haarlem Baseball Week.

South Korea was a founding member of the Baseball Federation of Asia in 1954. It played at the inaugural Asian Baseball Championship in Manila, which was also the team's first meeting with archrival Japan (suffering an 0–6 loss). Korea won its first victory in the rivalry nine years later, defeating Japan 5–2 at the 1963 Asian Baseball Championship in Seoul.

South Korea debuted at the 1976 Amateur World Series. With the country hosting the 1982 Amateur World Series, the South Korean team scored a dramatic victory over Japan when, trailing 0–2 in the bottom of the eighth, Kim Jae-bak hit a three-run homer off a foul pole. South Korea became the first Asian country to win the amateur baseball competition, finishing with an 8–1 record.

=== 2000 Sydney Olympics ===
Since the 2000 Summer Olympic Games in Sydney, professional baseball players have been permitted to play and the South Korean team that was formed was often called the "Korean Dream Team". This team won the bronze medal. At that time, the top four teams (Cuba, United States, South Korea and Japan) advanced to the semi-finals. In the semi-final game, the South Koreans faced the United States team and lost. In the bronze medal match, the South Koreans played against the Japanese and won the game 3–1.

=== 2008 Beijing Olympics ===
After losing 4–3 to Japan at the 2007 Asian Baseball Championships, the South Koreans finished with a 2–1 record and were forced to seek entrance to the 2008 Olympics via the Final Olympic Qualifying Tournament to be held March 7–14, 2008 in Taichung, Taiwan.

The South Korean roster, for the qualifying, is mainly professional players from the Korea Baseball Organization and is not subjected to the scheduling conflicts that troubled the teams from Australia, Canada, and Mexico.

Going into the tournament rated by the experts as an outsider, or a dark horse at most, South Korea surprised everybody by finishing the group stage in first place with a perfect 7–0 record. The team began its run with come from behind win against heavily favored United States, scoring the winning run in the bottom of the 9th inning with a sacrifice fly. Disappointment soon followed the next game, however, as China (undeniably the weakest team in the tournament) stymied South Korea for most of the game before the game was suspended because of rain in the 6th inning with a 0–0 score. South Korea bounced back the following day with a tightly contested 1–0 victory over Canada, with Ryu Hyun-Jin recording a complete-game shutout. After dispatching their rivals Japan 5–3 in the next game, South Korea finished off China in the continuation of the aforementioned suspended game by winning 1–0 in the extra innings. South Korea then clinched their place in the final four by beating Chinese Taipei 9–8, followed by another surprise victory over heavily favored Cubans, 7–4 (which guaranteed them finishing first place in the group round). The team finished their Round Robin Tournament in style, hammering the Netherlands 10–0 and beating them on mercy rule.

In the Semifinal match, the team was once again matched up against their arch-rivals Japan. The first half of the game was very tight as Japan was leading 2–1 going into the 7th inning. South Korea soon tied the ballgame at 2 apiece in the bottom half, then took the lead in the 8th thanks in large part to Lee Seung-Yeop's clutch 2-run home run. South Korea added 2 more runs that inning. South Korea eventually ended with a 6–2 victory. In the finals they overcame the perennial favorites Cuba for the second time in the tournament, surviving a bases-loaded 9th inning situation with a double play to win the game 3–2, allowing South Korea to obtain their gold medal for Baseball. South Korea also earned 12 other gold medals during the Olympics making them the second highest gold medalist country after China in Asia.

=== 2006 World Baseball Classic ===
The South Korean team playing in the 2006 World Baseball Classic included not just South Korean players based in South Korea, but South Korean players in the U.S. from Major League Baseball. In the Classic, the team played in and won every game they played in Pool A. They advanced to round two, again winning all three games to secure a place in the semifinals. Upon reaching the semifinals, the South Korean government announced that it would waive for the players on the team the mandatory two-year military service required of all young South Korean men. However, at the semifinals, the South Korean team lost to Japan, whom they had beaten twice previously. This led to controversy over the regulations of the WBC concerning the fact that South Korea had to face Japan three times and that it was Japan that was allowed to go to the finals, when it had four victories and three losses up to that point, two of those losses to South Korea, while the South Korean team, which had only one loss and had already beaten Japan twice, was eliminated from the finals.

=== 2009 World Baseball Classic ===
South Korea competed in the 2009 World Baseball Classic, playing the first round in Pool A in Tokyo. South Korea opened the tournament with a 7–0 rout of Chinese Taipei. South Korea then lost to Japan in a 14–2 contest shortened to 7 innings by the WBC's early termination rule. In its third game, South Korea soundly defeated China 14–0 in a similarly shortened contest, securing advancement to the second round and ousting China from the tournament. South Korea won the final Pool A game by a 1–0 win over Japan in order to advance as the Pool A winner. In Pool 1, the round 2 of the WBC, South Korea beat Mexico 8–2 and then went on to beat Japan again 4–1, securing advancement to the semifinals. South Korea beat Venezuela 10–2 to secure a spot on the finals. In the final game however, South Korea lost to Japan 5–3.

=== 2013 World Baseball Classic ===
South Korea competed in the 2013 World Baseball Classic for the third time, playing the first round in Pool B at the Taichung Intercontinental Baseball Stadium in Taichung, Taiwan, facing the Netherlands, Chinese Taipei and Australia. The Korean team lost the first game against the Netherlands 5–0, but won two next games against Chinese Taipei and Australia. Despite this, South Korea was eliminated in the first round for the first time since advancing to the semi-finals in the 2009 World Baseball Classic. However, even after elimination, South Korea earned their direct qualification to the upcoming 2017 World Baseball Classic.

=== 2015 WBSC Premier12 ===
Team South Korea won the 2015 WBSC Premier12 Tournament.

=== 2017 World Baseball Classic ===
South Korea lost the first game in the first round to surprising newcomers Israel, 2–1 in 10 innings. They also lost their second game against the Netherlands 5–0. They were eliminated for the second time ever, after their poor performance at the 2013 World Baseball Classic, as Israel and the Netherlands advanced to the next round. South Korea took third place in the pool, as it beat Taiwan in 10 innings, 11–8.

South Korea is facing Israel, the Netherlands, and Taiwan in the 2017 World Baseball Classic.

=== 2019 WBSC Premier12 ===
Team South Korea came in second in the 12-team 2019 WBSC Premier12 Tournament, which was held in November 2019. Two quota spots were allocated from the Tournament, of the spots for six baseball teams at the 2020 Olympic Games, with South Korea qualifying as the top finisher from the Asia/Oceana territory (other than Japan, which already qualified as host).

=== 2023 World Baseball Classic ===
In January 2020, the WBC announced the 16 national teams which participated at the 2017 World Baseball Classic, which included South Korea, that automatically qualified for that tournament.

=== 2026 World Baseball Classic ===
South Korea competed in the 2026 World Baseball Classic in March 2026. In a group with Japan, Australia, Chinese Taipei (Taiwan) and the Czech Republic, they advanced to the quarterfinals for the first time since 2009 before falling 10-0 to the Dominican Republic.

== Results and fixtures ==
The following is a list of professional baseball match results currently active in the latest version of the WBSC World Rankings, as well as any future matches that have been scheduled.

Legend

Win Lose Void or postponed Fixture

=== 2019 ===
Asian Championship GS	October 14	South Korea	4–5 (F/10)	China	Taichung Stadium, Taiwan
Asian Championship GS	12:00 NST		Boxscore		Attendance: 200

Asian Championship GS	October 15	Pakistan	1–12 (F/7)	South Korea	Douliu Stadium, Taiwan
Asian Championship GS	12:00 NST		Boxscore		Attendance: 350

Asian Championship GS	October 16	Philippines	2–12 (F/7)	South Korea	Douliu Stadium, Taiwan
Asian Championship GS	12:00 NST		Boxscore		Attendance: 166

Asian Championship SR	October 18	South Korea	1–7	Chinese Taipei	Taichung Stadium, Taiwan
Asian Championship SR	18:30 NST		Boxscore		Attendance: 1,250

Asian Championship SR	October 19	South Korea	3–11	Japan	Taichung Stadium, Taiwan
Asian Championship SR	12:00 NST		Boxscore		Attendance: 362

Asian Championship 3rd	October 20	South Korea	6–8	China	Taichung Stadium, Taiwan
Asian Championship 3rd	12:00 NST		Boxscore		Attendance: 0

WBSC Premier12 GS	November 6	Australia	0–5	South Korea	Gocheok Dome, South Korea
WBSC Premier12 GS	19:00 KST		Boxscore		Attendance: 5,899

WBSC Premier12 GS	November 7	South Korea	3–1	Canada	Gocheok Dome, South Korea
WBSC Premier12 GS	19:00 KST		Boxscore		Attendance: 6,000

WBSC Premier12 GS	November 8	Cuba	0–7	South Korea	Gocheok Dome, South Korea
WBSC Premier12 GS	19:00 KST		Boxscore		Attendance: 13,600

WBSC Premier12 SR	November 11	United States	1–5	South Korea	Tokyo Dome, Japan
WBSC Premier12 SR	19:00 JT		Boxscore		Attendance: 3,012

WBSC Premier12 SR	November 12	Chinese Taipei	7–0	South Korea	ZOZO Marine Stadium, Japan
WBSC Premier12 SR	19:00 JT		Boxscore		Attendance: 4,056

WBSC Premier12 SR	November 15	Mexico	3–7	South Korea	Tokyo Dome, Japan
WBSC Premier12 SR	19:00 JT		Boxscore		Attendance: 5,121

WBSC Premier12 SR	November 16	South Korea	8–10	Japan	Tokyo Dome, Japan
WBSC Premier12 SR	19:00 JT		Boxscore		Attendance: 44,224

WBSC Premier12 F	November 17	South Korea	3–5	Japan	Tokyo Dome, Japan
WBSC Premier12 F	19:00 JT		Boxscore		Attendance: 44,960

=== 2021 ===
Summer Olympics GS	July 29	Israel	5–6 (F/10)	South Korea	Yokohama Stadium, Japan
Summer Olympics GS	19:00 JT	LP: Jeremy Bleich; HR: Ian Kinsler (1), Ryan Lavarnway (2)	Boxscore	WP: Oh Seung-hwan; HR: Oh Ji-hwan (1), Lee Jung-hoo (1), Hyun-soo Kim (1)	Attendance: 0

Summer Olympics GS	July 31	South Korea	2–4	United States	Yokohama Stadium, Japan
Summer Olympics GS	19:00 JT	LP: Ko Young-pyo	Boxscore	WP: Nick Martinez; Sv: David Robertson; HR: Triston Casas (1), Nick Allen (1)	Attendance: 0

Summer Olympics R1	August 1	Dominican Republic	3–4	South Korea	Yokohama Stadium, Japan
Summer Olympics R1	19:00 JT	LP: Luis Felipe Castillo; HR: Juan Francisco (1)	Boxscore	WP: Oh Seung-hwan	Attendance: 0

Summer Olympics R2	August 2	Israel	1–11 (F/7)	South Korea	Yokohama Stadium, Japan
Summer Olympics R2	12:00 JT	LP: Joey Wagman	Boxscore	WP: Cho Sang-woo; HR: Oh Ji-hwan (2), Hyun-soo Kim (2)	Attendance: 0

Summer Olympics SF	August 4	South Korea	2–5	Japan	Yokohama Stadium, Japan
Summer Olympics SF	19:00 JT	LP: Go Woo-suk	Boxscore	WP: Hiromi Itoh; Sv: Ryoji Kuribayashi (2)	Attendance: 0

Summer Olympics SFR	August 5	South Korea	2–7	United States	Yokohama Stadium, Japan
Summer Olympics SFR	19:00 JT	LP: Lee Eui-lee	Boxscore	WP: Ryder Ryan; HR: Jamie Westbrook	Attendance: 0

Summer Olympics 3rd	August 7	Dominican Republic	10–6	South Korea	Yokohama Stadium, Japan
Summer Olympics 3rd	12:00 JT	WP: Cristopher Mercedes; Sv: Jumbo Díaz (1); HR: Juan Francisco (2), Julio Rodríguez (1), Johan Mieses (2)	Boxscore	LP: Oh Seung-hwan; HR: Hyun-soo Kim (3)	Attendance: 0

=== 2023 ===
World Baseball Classic GS	March 9	Australia	8–7	South Korea	Tokyo Dome, Japan
World Baseball Classic GS	12:00 JT	WP: Jon Kennedy (1–0); Sv: Josh Guyer (1); HR: Tim Kennelly (1), Robbie Glendinning (1), Robbie Perkins (1)	Boxscore	LP: Kim Won-jung (0–1); HR: Yang Eui-ji (1)	Umpires: HP – Ramon De Jesus, 1B – Fabrizio Fabrizzi, 2B – Adam Hamari, 3B – Chan-Jung Chang

World Baseball Classic GS	March 10	South Korea	4–13	Japan	Tokyo Dome, Japan
World Baseball Classic GS	19:00 JT	LP: Kwang-hyun Kim (0–1); HR: Yang Eui-ji (2), Park Kun-woo (1)	Boxscore	WP: Yu Darvish (1–0); HR: Kensuke Kondo (1)	Attendance: 41,629; Umpires: HP: Laz Díaz, 1B: Stu Scheurwater, 2B: Delfin Colon, 3B: Cuti Suárez

World Baseball Classic GS	March 12	Czech Republic	3–7	South Korea	Tokyo Dome, Japan
World Baseball Classic GS	12:00 JT	LP: Lukas Ercoli (0–1)	Boxscore	WP: Park Se-woong (1–0); Sv: Lee Yong-chan (1); HR: Ha-seong Kim (2)	Umpires: HP – Delfin Colon, 1B – Laz Diaz, 2B – Fabrizio Fabrizzi, 3B – Ben May

World Baseball Classic GS	March 13	South Korea	22–2 (F/5)	China	Tokyo Dome, Japan
World Baseball Classic GS	19:00 JT	WP: Hyeong Jun So (1–0); HR: Park Kun-woo (2), Ha-seong Kim (3)	Boxscore	LP: Alan Carter (0–1)	Attendance: 14,142; Umpires: HP – Stu Scheurwater, 1B – Adam Hamari, 2B – Chan-Jung Chang, 3B – Cuti Suarez

2022 Asian Games – Group B	October 1	Hong Kong	0–10 (F/8)	South Korea	Baseball & Softball Sports Center, Shaoxing, China
2022 Asian Games – Group B	18:30 CST	LP: Leung Chung Hei (0–1)	Boxscore	WP: Choi Ji-min (1–0); Sv: Park Yeong-hyun	Umpires: HP – Hironori Yoshino (JPN), 1B – Chih-Hao Li (TPE), 2B – Sheng Zhu (CHN), 3B – Ricky Bernabe (PHI)

2022 Asian Games – Group B	October 2	South Korea	0–4	Chinese Taipei	Baseball & Softball Sports Center, Shaoxing, China
2022 Asian Games – Group B	18:30 CST	LP: Moon Dong-ju (0–1)	Boxscore	WP: Lin Yu-min (1–0)	Umpires: HP – Shunichi Fukazawa (JPN), 1B – Tianyi Wang (CHN), 2B – Jie Fan (CHN), 3B – Masataka Mino (JPN)

2022 Asian Games – Group B	October 3	Thailand	0–17 (F/5)	South Korea	Baseball & Softball Sports Center, Shaoxing, China
2022 Asian Games – Group B	12:00 CST	LP: Wutthikorn Phoomwut (0–1)	Boxscore	WP: Na Gyun-an (1–0); HR: Choi Ji-hoon (1), Yoon Dong-hee (1), Kim Ju-won (1)	Umpires: HP – Jie Fan (CHN), 1B – Shunichi Fukazawa (JPN), 2B – Ding Wu (CHN), 3B – Ricky Bernabe (PHI)

2022 Asian Games – Super Round	October 5	South Korea	2–0	Japan	Baseball & Softball Sports Center, Shaoxing, China
2022 Asian Games – Super Round	18:30 CST	WP: Park Se-woong (1–0); Sv: Park Yeong-hyun	Boxscore	LP: Kayo Shuichiro (0–1)	Umpires: HP – Tim Wen (TPE), 1B – Jie Fan (CHN), 2B – Te-Jung Chen (TPE), 3B – Ding Wu (CHN)

2022 Asian Games – Super Round	October 6	South Korea	8–1	China	Baseball & Softball Sports Center, Shaoxing, China
2022 Asian Games – Super Round	12:00 CST	WP: Won Tae-in (1–0); HR: Kim Ju-won (1), Kang Baek-ho (1)	Boxscore	LP: Wang Weiyi (0–1)	Umpires: HP – Chih-Hao Li (TPE), 1B – Masataka Mino (JPN), 2B – Tim Wen (TPE), 3B – Shunichi Fukazawa (JPN)

2022 Asian Games – Gold Medal Game	October 7	South Korea	2–0	Chinese Taipei	Baseball & Softball Sports Center, Shaoxing, China
2022 Asian Games – Gold Medal Game	18:00 CST	WP: Moon Dong-ju (1–1); Sv: Woo-suk Go		LP: Lin Yu-min (1–1)	Umpires: HP – Masataka Mino (JPN), 1B – Jie Fan (CHN), 2B – Shunichi Fukazawa (JPN), 3B – Tianyi Wang (CHN), LF – Ding Wu (CHN), RF – Hironori Yoshino (JPN)

2023 Asia Professional Baseball Championship	November 16	South Korea	3–2	Australia	Tokyo Dome, Tokyo, Japan
2023 Asia Professional Baseball Championship	12:00 JST		Boxscore

2023 Asia Professional Baseball Championship	November 17	Japan	2–1	South Korea	Tokyo Dome, Tokyo, Japan
2023 Asia Professional Baseball Championship	19:00 JST		Boxscore

2023 Asia Professional Baseball Championship	November 18	South Korea	6–1	Chinese Taipei	Tokyo Dome, Tokyo, Japan
2023 Asia Professional Baseball Championship	19:00 JST		Boxscore

2023 Asia Professional Baseball Championship – Gold Medal Game	November 19	Japan	4–3	South Korea	Tokyo Dome, Tokyo, Japan
2023 Asia Professional Baseball Championship – Gold Medal Game	18:00 JST		Boxscore

2023 Asian Baseball Championship – Group A	December 3	Chinese Taipei	4–0	South Korea	Taipei Dome, Taipei, Taiwan
2023 Asian Baseball Championship – Group A	18:00 TST	WP: Hsu Jo-Hsi (1–0)	Boxscore	LP: Shin Heon-min (0–1)	Attendance: 16,647; Umpires: HP – Yasuhiro Shimizu (JPN), 1B – Kazuyuki Miura (JPN), 2B – Cheung Sui Man (HKG), 3B – Sandy Wijaya Kusuma (INA)

2023 Asian Baseball Championship – Group A	December 5	Hong Kong	0–9	South Korea	Taipei Dome, Taipei, Taiwan
2023 Asian Baseball Championship – Group A	12:30 TST	LP: Tsang Kin-nam (0–1)	Boxscore	WP: Kang Dong-hun (1–0); HR: Yoo Ro-gyeol	Attendance: 75; Umpires: HP – Jan Chung-Chi (TPE), 1B – Chen Te-Jung (TPE), 2B – Chen Chao-Chieh (TPE), 3B – Sandy Wijaya Kusuma (INA)

2023 Asian Baseball Championship – Group A	December 6	Palestine	1–19 (F/5)	South Korea	Taipei Dome, Taipei, Taiwan
2023 Asian Baseball Championship – Group A	12:30 TST	LP: Abdelfattah Muhammad (0–1)	Boxscore	WP: Lee Byeong-heon (1–0)	Attendance: 168; Umpires: HP – Chen Chao-Chieh (TPE), 1B – Sandy Wijaya Kusuma (INA), 2B – Chen Te-Jung (TPE), 3B – Jan Chung-Chi (TPE)

2023 Asian Baseball Championship – Super Round	December 8	Philippines	2–8	South Korea	Taipei Dome, Taipei, Taiwan
2023 Asian Baseball Championship – Super Round	12:30 TST	LP: Kennedy Torres (0–1)	Boxscore	WP: Shin Heon-min (1–1)	Attendance: 763; Umpires: HP – Chen Te-Jung (TPE), 1B – Chen Chao-Chieh (TPE), 2B – Jan Chung-Chi (TPE), 3B – Kazuyuki Miura (JPN)

2023 Asian Baseball Championship – Super Round	December 9	Japan	5–2	South Korea	Taipei Dome, Taipei, Taiwan
2023 Asian Baseball Championship – Super Round	12:30 TST	WP: Sho Akiyama (2–0); Sv: Tetsuyuki Fujimura	Boxscore	LP: Lee Byeong-heon (0–1); HR: Kim Beom-seok (1)	Attendance: 8,563; Umpires: HP – Hsu Jie (TPE), 1B – Tim Wen (TPE), 2B – Te-Jung Chen (TPE), 3B – Sandy Wijaya Kusuma (INA)

2023 Asian Baseball Championship – Bronze Medal Game	December 10	Philippines	0–7	South Korea	Taipei Dome, Taipei, Taiwan
2023 Asian Baseball Championship – Bronze Medal Game	12:30 TST	LP: Romeo Jasmin Jr.	Boxscore	WP: Kim Dong-hyeok (1–0)	Attendance: 3,008; Umpires: HP – Tim Wen (TPE), 1B – Kazuyuki Miura (JPN), 2B – Te-Jung Chen (TPE), 3B – Hsu Jie (TPE), LF – Hsing-Feng Lin (TPE), RF – Jirapat Lapikun (THA)

=== 2024 ===
Friendly	November 1	Cuba	0-2	South Korea	Gocheok Dome, South Korea
Friendly	18:35 KST	LP: Yoennis Yera		WP: Kim Taek-yeon; Sv: Park Yeong-hyun	Attendance: 15,783

Friendly	November 2	South Korea	13-3	Cuba	Gocheok Dome, South Korea
Friendly	14:00 KST	WP: Ko Young-pyo; HR: Yoon Dong-hee (1)		LP: Yusniel Padron; HR: Yoelkis Guibert (1)	Attendance: 16,100

WBSC Premier12 GS	November 13	South Korea	3-6	Chinese Taipei	Taipei Dome, Taiwan
WBSC Premier12 GS	18:30 NST	LP: Ko Young-pyo; HR: Na Seung-yeop (1)	Boxscore	WP: Chang Yi; Sv: Wu Chun-Wei; HR: Chen Chen-Wei (1), Chen Chieh-hsien (1)	Attendance: 39,000

WBSC Premier12 GS	November 14	Cuba	4-8	South Korea	Tianmu Baseball Stadium, Taiwan
WBSC Premier12 GS	18:00 NST	LP: Liván Moinelo; HR: Yoelkis Guibert (1), Rafael Viñales(1)	Boxscore	WP: So Hyeong-jun; HR: Kim Do-yeong (2)	Attendance: 2,225

WBSC Premier12 GS	November 15	South Korea	3-6	Japan	Taipei Dome, Taiwan
WBSC Premier12 GS	18:00 NST	LP: Kwak Do-kyu; HR: Park Dong-won (1)	Boxscore	WP: Chihiro Sumida; Sv: Taisei Ota; HR: Shōta Morishita (1)	Attendance: 20,028

WBSC Premier12 GS	November 16	Dominican Republic	6-9	South Korea	Tianmu Baseball Stadium, Taiwan
WBSC Premier12 GS	18:30 NST	LP: Diego Castillo; HR: Arismendy Alcántara (1)	Boxscore	WP: Park Yeong-hyun	Attendance: 3,387

WBSC Premier12 GS	November 18	Australia	2-5	South Korea	Tianmu Baseball Stadium, Taiwan
WBSC Premier12 GS	12:00 NST	LP: Steven Kent	Boxscore	WP: So Hyeong-jun; Sv: Park Yeong-hyun; HR: Kim Do-yeong (1)	Attendance: 1,799

=== 2025 ===
2025 Asian Baseball Championship – Group B	September 22	Hong Kong	1–16 (F/6)	South Korea	Pingtan Baseball Stadium, Pingtan, China
2025 Asian Baseball Championship – Group B	13:30 CST	LP: Mok Chun-pui	Boxscore	WP: Woo Kang-hun (1–0)	Attendance: 58; Umpires: HP – Hsing-Feng Lin (TPE), 1B – Tianyi Wang (CHN), 2B – Haonan Yuan (CHN), 3B – Zexin Niu (CHN)

2025 Asian Baseball Championship – Group B	September 23	Chinese Taipei	10–0 (F/7)	South Korea	Pingtan Baseball Stadium, Pingtan, China
2025 Asian Baseball Championship – Group B	18:30 CST	WP: Chen Mu-heng (1–0)	Boxscore	LP: Kim Jong-un (0–1)	Attendance: 500; Umpires: HP – Tianyi Wang (CHN), 1B – Katsutoshi Takahashi (JPN), 2B – Leyu Guan (CHN), 3B – Patrick Ng (SGP)

2025 Asian Baseball Championship – Group B	September 24	Palestine	0–9	South Korea	Pingtan Baseball Stadium, Pingtan, China
2025 Asian Baseball Championship – Group B	12:30 CST	LP: Harajli Ahmad	Boxscore	WP: Hong Ming-yu (1–0)	Attendance: 150; Umpires: HP – Leyu Guan (CHN), 1B – Weiwu Wang (CHN), 2B – Hsing-Feng Lin (TPE), 3B – Heng Mao (CHN)

2025 Asian Baseball Championship – Super Round	September 26	South Korea	8–6	China	Pingtan Baseball Stadium, Pingtan, China
2025 Asian Baseball Championship – Super Round	12:30 CST	WP: Kim Jong-un (1–1)	Boxscore	LP: Wu Haizheng (0–2)	Attendance: 800; Umpires: HP – Hsing-Feng Lin (TPE), 1B – Katsutoshi Takahashi (JPN), 2B – Te-Jung Chen (TPE), 3B – Patrick Ng (SGP)

2025 Asian Baseball Championship – Super Round	September 27	South Korea	1–0	Japan	Pingtan Baseball Stadium, Pingtan, China
2025 Asian Baseball Championship – Super Round	18:30 CST	WP: Hong Ming-yu (2–0); Sv: Yang Jae-hun	Boxscore	LP: Masui Shota (1–1)	Attendance: 1,300; Umpires: HP – Te-Jung Chen (TPE), 1B – Tianyi Wang (CHN), 2B – Hsing-Feng Lin (TPE), 3B – Zexin Niu (CHN)

2025 Asian Baseball Championship – Bronze Medal Game	September 28	China	3–4	South Korea	Pingtan Baseball Stadium, Pingtan, China
2025 Asian Baseball Championship – Bronze Medal Game	12:30 CST	LP: Suo Xudi (0–1)	Boxscore	WP: Yang Jae-hun (1–0)	Attendance: 2,000; Umpires: HP – Te-Jung Chen (TPE), 1B – Katsutoshi Takahashi (JPN), 2B – Hsing-Feng Lin (TPE), 3B – Miyauchi Kazuyoshi (JPN), LF – Roland Siacor (PHI), RF – Patrick Ng (SGP)

Friendly	November 8	Czech Republic	0–3	South Korea	Gocheok Dome, South Korea
Friendly	14:03 KST	LP: Jan Novák	Boxscore	WP: Kim Keon-woo; Sv: Jo Byeong-hyeon

Friendly	November 9	South Korea	11–1	Czech Republic	Gocheok Dome, South Korea
Friendly	14:00 KST	WP: Lee Min-seok; HR: Lee Jae-won (1)	Boxscore	LP: Thomas Ondra

Friendly	November 15	South Korea	4–11	Japan	Tokyo Dome, Japan
Friendly	18:36 JST	LP: Kim Taek-yeon; HR: Ahn Hyun-min (1), Song Sung-mun (1)	Boxscore	WP: Yuki Matsumoto; HR: Yukinori Kishida (1)

Friendly	November 16	Japan	7–7	South Korea	Tokyo Dome, Japan
Friendly	19:08 JST		Boxscore	HR: Ahn Hyun-min (2), Kim Ju-won (1)

=== 2026 ===
World Baseball Classic GS	March 5	Czech Republic	4–11	South Korea	Tokyo Dome, Tokyo, Japan
World Baseball Classic GS	19:00 JST	LP: Daniel Padyšák (0–1); HR: Terrin Vavra (1)	Boxscore	WP: So Hyeong-jun (1–0); HR: Moon Bo-gyeong (1), Shay Whitcomb 2 (2), Jahmai Jones (1)	Attendance: 19,920; Umpires: HP – David Rackley (USA), 1B – Edward Pinales (DOM), 2B – Ryan Additon (USA), 3B – Edwin Louisa (CUR)

World Baseball Classic GS	March 7	South Korea	6–8	Japan	Tokyo Dome, Tokyo, Japan
World Baseball Classic GS	19:00 JST	LP: Park Yeong-hyun (0–1); HR: Hyeseong Kim (1)	Boxscore	WP: Atsuki Taneichi (1–0); Sv: Taisei Ota; HR: Shohei Ohtani (2), Seiya Suzuki 2 (2), Masataka Yoshida (1)	Attendance: 42,318; Umpires: HP – Todd Tichenor (USA), 1B – Jordan Baker (USA), 2B – Edward Pinales (DOM), 3B – Edwin Louisa (CUR)

World Baseball Classic GS	March 8	Chinese Taipei	5–4 (F/10)	South Korea	Tokyo Dome, Tokyo, Japan
World Baseball Classic GS	12:00 JST	WP: Yi Chang (1–0); Sv: Jyun-Yue Tseng; HR: Yu Chang (1), Tsung-Che Cheng (1), Stuart Fairchild (2)	Boxscore	LP: Woo-suk Go (0–1); HR: Kim Do-yeong (1)	Attendance: 40,584; Umpires: HP – Manny Gonzalez (USA), 1B – David Rackley (USA), 2B – Ruben Ramos (PAN), 3B – Omar Peralta (MEX)

World Baseball Classic GS	March 9	South Korea	7–2	Australia	Tokyo Dome, Tokyo, Japan
World Baseball Classic GS	19:00 JST	WP: Son Ju-young (1–0); HR: Moon Bo-gyeong (2)	Boxscore	LP: Lachlan Wells (0–1); HR: Robbie Glendinning (1)	Attendance: 32,908; Umpires: HP – David Rackley (USA), 1B – Todd Tichenor (USA), 2B – Edwin Louisa (CUR), 3B – Edward Pinales (DOM)

World Baseball Classic QF	March 13	South Korea	0–10 (F/7)	Dominican Republic	LoanDepot Park, Miami, United States
World Baseball Classic QF	18:30 EDT	LP: Hyun-jin Ryu (0–1)	Boxscore	WP: Cristopher Sánchez (1–0); HR: Austin Wells (2)	Attendance: 30,805; Umpires: HP – Dan Iassogna (USA), 1B – Chris Segal (USA), 2B – Tim Meyer (USA), 3B – Maikol Tibibijo (DOM)

== Tournament record ==
=== World Baseball Classic ===
World Baseball Classic record							Qualification record			
Year	Round	Position	W	L	RS	RA	W	L	RS	RA
(Japan) (United States) 2006	Third place	3rd	6	1	26	14	No qualifiers held			
(Japan) (United States) 2009	Runners-up	2nd	6	3	53	30	No qualifiers held			
(Taiwan) 2013	Group stage	9th	2	1	9	7	Automatically qualified			
(South Korea) 2017	Group stage	10th	1	2	12	15	Automatically qualified			
(Japan) 2023	Group stage	11th	2	2	40	26	Automatically qualified			
(Japan) (United States) 2026	Quarterfinals	8th	2	3	28	29	Automatically qualified			
Total	Runners-up	6/6	19	12	168	121	—	—	—	—

=== Olympic Games ===
Summer Olympics record							Qualification record
Year	Round	Position	W	L	RS	RA	Method
(United States) 1984	Finals	4th (Note: No medals awarded; tournament was a demonstration sport only)	2	3	12	17	(gold) 1982 Amateur World Series
(South Korea) 1988	Finals	4th	2	3	11	19	Qualified as hosts
(Spain) 1992	Did not qualify						1987 Asian Baseball Championship
(United States) 1996	Preliminary	8th	1	6	40	59	1995 Asian Baseball Championship
(Australia) 2000	Bronze medal	3rd	5	4	45	30	1999 Asian Baseball Championship
(Greece) 2004	Did not qualify						2003 Asian Baseball Championship
(China) 2008	Gold medal	1st	9	0	50	26	Final Qualifying Tournament
(Japan) 2020	Fourth Place	4th	3	4	33	35	2019 WBSC Premier12
(United States) 2028	To be determined						
Total (Note: Totals only include years 1992 to 2020, during which baseball was an official medal sport.)	1 Title	4/6	18	14	168	150	

=== WBSC Premier12 ===
WBSC Premier12 record
Year	Round	Position	W	L	RS	RA	Ranking
(Japan) (Taiwan) 2015	Champions	1st	6	2	48	19	8th
(South Korea) (Japan) 2019	Runners-up	2nd	5	3	38	25	3rd
(Japan) (Taiwan) 2024	Opening Round	5th	3	2	28	24	4th
2027	To be determined						
Total	1 Title	3/3	14	7	114	68	

=== Asian Games ===
Asian Games record
Year	Round	Position	W	L	# of teams
(Japan) 1994	Runners-up	2nd	3	1	6
(Thailand) 1998	Champions	1st	6	0	6
(South Korea) 2002	Champions	1st	6	0	5
(Qatar) 2006	Third Place	3rd	3	2	6
(China) 2010	Champions	1st	5	0	8
(South Korea) 2014	Champions	1st	5	0	8
(Indonesia) 2018	Champions	1st	5	1	10
(China) 2022	Champions	1st	5	1	9
(Japan) 2026	Champions	1st	5	1	8
Total	7 Titles	8/8	43	6	

==== 2010 Asian Games ====
2010 Asian Games Baseball was held in Guangzhou, China from November 13 to 19, 2010. Only a men's competition was held. All games were played at the Aoti Baseball Field. South Korea beat Chinese Taipei 9–3 in the final to win the gold medal.

==== 2014 Asian Games ====
2014 Asian Games Baseball was held in Incheon, South Korea from September 22 to 28, 2014. All games were played at the Munhak Baseball Stadium and Mokdong Baseball Stadium. South Korea beat Chinese Taipei 6–3 in the final to win the gold medal.

=== Other tournaments ===
Baseball World Cup
Year	Host	Position	W	L	# of teams
1976	Cartagena	6	5	5	11
1978	Rome	3	9	2	11
1980	Tokyo	2	9	2	12
1982	Seoul	1	8	1	10
1984	Havana	5	5	7	13
1986	Amsterdam	2	8	3	12
1988	Rome	8	5	6	12
1990	Edmonton	3	5	4	12
1994	Managua	2	7	3	16
1998	Rome	2	6	4	16
2001	Taipei	6	6	4	16
2003	Havana	8	3	6	16
2005	Rotterdam	2	7	4	18
2007	Taipei	5	6	4	16
2009	Nettuno	9	4	6	22
2011	Panama	6	6	6	16

Intercontinental Cup
Year	Host	Position	W	L	# of teams
1975	Canada	5	3	4	8
1977	Managua	1	10	4	9
1981	Edmonton	4	5	4	8
1983	Belgium	5	3	3	7
1985	Edmonton	2	6	3	8
1987	Havana	6	6	7	10
1989	San Juan	4	3	5	8
1991	Barcelona	5	6	3	10
1993	Italy	5	5	4	10
1995	Havana	4	5	4	12
1999	Australia	7	2	5	8
2002	Havana	2	7	3	10
2006	Taichung	7	3	6	8
2010	Taichung	6	3	5	10

Asian Baseball Championship

- 1954 : (bronze) 3rd
- 1955 : (bronze) 3rd
- 1959 : (silver) 2nd
- 1962 : (silver) 2nd
- 1963 : (gold) 1st
- 1965 : (silver) 2nd
- 1967 : (silver) 2nd
- 1969 : 4th
- 1971 : (gold) 1st
- 1973 : (silver) 2nd
- 1975 : (gold) 1st
- 1983 : (gold) 1st
- 1985 : (silver) 2nd
- 1987 : (bronze) 3rd
- 1989 : (gold) 1st
- 1991 : (bronze) 3rd
- 1993 : (silver) 2nd
- 1995 : (silver) 2nd
- 1997 : (gold) 1st
- 1999 : (gold) 1st
- 2001 : (silver) 2nd
- 2003 : (bronze) 3rd
- 2005 : 4th
- 2007 : (silver) 2nd
- 2009 : (bronze) 3rd
- 2012 : (bronze) 3rd
- 2015 : (gold) 1st
- 2017 : (bronze) 3rd
- 2019 : 4th
- 2023 : (bronze) 3rd
- 2025 : (bronze) 3rd

== Players ==
=== Roster ===
The following players are called up to participate in the 2026 World Baseball Classic:

Manager: 6 Ryu Ji-hyun

Coaches: Bench 21 Kang In-kwon, Hitting 89 Lee Jin-young, Pitching 77 Kim Kwang-sam, First base 85 Lee Dong-wook, Third base 72 Kim Jae-gul, Bullpen 88 Ryu Taek-hyun, Quality control 92 Choi Won-ho, Training 75 Kim Yong-il

Player	No.	Pos.	Date of birth (age)	Team	League	Birthplace
Dane Dunning	33	RHP	December 20, 1994 (aged 31)	(United States) Seattle Mariners (minors)	Minor League Baseball	(United States) Orange Park, Florida
Go Woo-suk	19	RHP	August 6, 1998 (aged 27)	(United States) Detroit Tigers (minors)	Minor League Baseball	(South Korea) Incheon
Gwak Been	47	RHP	May 28, 1998 (aged 27)	(South Korea) Doosan Bears	KBO League	(South Korea) Seoul
Jeong Woo-joo	61	RHP	November 7, 2006 (aged 19)	(South Korea) Hanwha Eagles	KBO League	(South Korea) Namyangju
Jo Byeong-hyeon	11	RHP	May 8, 2002 (aged 23)	(South Korea) SSG Landers	KBO League	(South Korea) Asan
Kim Taek-yeon	63	RHP	June 3, 2005 (aged 20)	(South Korea) Doosan Bears	KBO League	(South Korea) Incheon
Kim Young-kyu	14	LHP	February 10, 2000 (aged 26)	(South Korea) NC Dinos	KBO League	(South Korea) Gwangju
Ko Young-pyo	1	RHP	September 16, 1991 (aged 34)	(South Korea) KT Wiz	KBO League	(South Korea) Naju
Noh Kyung-eun	38	RHP	March 11, 1984 (aged 41)	(South Korea) SSG Landers	KBO League	(South Korea) Hampyeong
Park Yeong-hyun	60	RHP	October 11, 2003 (aged 22)	(South Korea) KT Wiz	KBO League	(South Korea) Gurye
Ryu Hyun-jin	99	LHP	December 25, 1987 (aged 38)	(South Korea) Hanwha Eagles	KBO League	(South Korea) Incheon
So Hyeong-jun	30	RHP	September 16, 2001 (aged 24)	(South Korea) KT Wiz	KBO League	(South Korea) Uijeongbu
Son Ju-young	29	LHP	December 2, 1998 (aged 27)	(South Korea) LG Twins	KBO League	(South Korea) Ulsan
Song Seung-ki	66	LHP	April 10, 2002 (aged 23)	(South Korea) LG Twins	KBO League	(South Korea) Siheung
You Young-chan	54	RHP	March 7, 1997 (aged 28)	(South Korea) LG Twins	KBO League	(South Korea) Ansan
Kim Hyung-jun	25	C	November 2, 1999 (aged 26)	(South Korea) NC Dinos	KBO League	(South Korea) Seoul
Park Dong-won	27	C	May 7, 1990 (aged 35)	(South Korea) LG Twins	KBO League	(South Korea) Busan
Kim Do-yeong	5	IF	October 2, 2003 (aged 22)	(South Korea) Kia Tigers	KBO League	(South Korea) Gwangju
Kim Hye-seong	3	IF	January 27, 1999 (aged 27)	(United States) Los Angeles Dodgers	Major League Baseball	(South Korea) Goyang
Kim Ju-won	7	IF	July 30, 2002 (aged 23)	(South Korea) NC Dinos	KBO League	(South Korea) Gunpo
Moon Bo-gyeong	2	IF	July 19, 2000 (aged 25)	(South Korea) LG Twins	KBO League	(South Korea) Seoul
Roh Si-hwan	8	IF	December 3, 2000 (aged 25)	(South Korea) Hanwha Eagles	KBO League	(South Korea) Ulsan
Shin Min-jae	4	IF	January 21, 1996 (aged 30)	(South Korea) LG Twins	KBO League	(South Korea) Incheon
Shay Whitcomb	10	IF	September 28, 1998 (aged 27)	(United States) Houston Astros	Major League Baseball	(United States) Thousand Oaks, California
Ahn Hyun-min	23	OF	August 22, 2003 (aged 22)	(South Korea) KT Wiz	KBO League	(South Korea) Gimhae
Jahmai Jones	15	OF	August 4, 1997 (aged 28)	(United States) Detroit Tigers	Major League Baseball	(United States) Roswell, Georgia
Koo Ja-wook	65	OF	February 12, 1993 (aged 33)	(South Korea) Samsung Lions	KBO League	(South Korea) Daegu
Lee Jung-hoo	22	OF	August 20, 1998 (aged 27)	(United States) San Francisco Giants	Major League Baseball	Nagoya, Japan
Moon Hyun-bin	51	OF	April 20, 2004 (aged 21)	(South Korea) Hanwha Eagles	KBO League	(South Korea) Daejeon
Park Hae-min	17	OF	February 24, 1990 (aged 36)	(South Korea) LG Twins	KBO League	(South Korea) Seoul

=== Roster list ===
World Baseball Classic

- 2026 World Baseball Classic roster
- 2023 World Baseball Classic roster
- 2017 World Baseball Classic roster
- 2013 World Baseball Classic roster
- 2009 World Baseball Classic roster
- 2006 World Baseball Classic roster

Olympic Games

- 2020 Summer Olympics roster
- 2008 Summer Olympics roster
- 2000 Summer Olympics roster
- 1996 Summer Olympics roster
- 1988 Summer Olympics roster
- 1984 Summer Olympics roster

WBSC Premier12

- 2024 WBSC Premier12 roster
- 2019 WBSC Premier12 roster
- 2015 WBSC Premier12 roster

Asian Games

- 2018 Asian Games roster
- 2014 Asian Games roster
- 2010 Asian Games roster
- 2006 Asian Games roster
- 2002 Asian Games roster

== Notable record ==
Date	Venue	Score	Opponent	Competition	Final result
Jun 27, 1975	Seoul, South Korea	28–0	Philippines	1975 Asian Baseball Championship	(gold) 1st
Nov 23, 1977	Managua, Nicaragua	13–3	Nicaragua	1977 Intercontinental Cup	(gold) 1st
Sep 6, 1982	Seoul, South Korea	11–0	Netherlands	1982 Baseball World Cup	(gold) 1st
Aug 7, 1984	Los Angeles, California	0–3	Chinese Taipei	1984 Olympic	4th
Aug 9, 1985	Edmonton, Canada	12–2	Japan	1985 Intercontinental Cup	(silver) 2nd
July 1986	Rotterdam, Netherlands	26–2	Belgium	1986 Baseball World Cup	(silver) 2nd
Aug 10, 1994	Managua, Nicaragua	16–0	Sweden	1994 Baseball World Cup	(silver) 2nd
Dec 10, 1994	Hiroshima, Japan	21–0	Mongolia	1994 Asian Games	(silver) 2nd
Sep 18, 1995	Kurashiki, Japan	27–0	Thailand	1995 Asian Baseball Championship	(silver) 2nd
May 26, 1997	Taipei, Taiwan	26–1	Philippines	1997 Asian Baseball Championship	(gold) 1st
Jul 22, 1998	Parma, Italy	11–1	Russia	1998 Baseball World Cup	(silver) 2nd
Dec 11, 1998	Bangkok, Thailand	13–1	Japan	1998 Asian Games	(gold) 1st
Sep 18, 2000	Sydney, Australia	3–5	Australia	2000 Summer Olympics	(bronze) 3rd
Sep 27, 2000	Sydney, Australia	3–1	Japan	2000 Summer Olympics	(bronze) 3rd
Nov 12, 2002	Matanzas, Cuba	10–0	Mexico	2002 Intercontinental Cup	(silver) 2nd
May 22, 2005	Miyazaki, Japan	3–4	China	2005 Asian Championship	4th
Mar 13, 2006	Anaheim, California	7–3	United States	2006 World Baseball Classic	(bronze) 3rd
Nov 9, 2007	Tianmu, Taiwan	18–2	Thailand	2007 Baseball World Cup	5th
Mar 26, 2008	Sinjhuang, Taiwan	16–2	Australia	2008 Final Olympic Qualification Tournament	(silver) 2nd (Qualified)
Aug 6, 2008	Seoul, South Korea	15–3	Cuba	Exhibition Game	
Aug 20, 2008	Beijing, China	10–0	Netherlands	2008 Summer Olympics	(gold) 1st
Aug 23, 2008	Beijing, China	3–2	Cuba	2008 Summer Olympics	(gold) 1st
Mar 8, 2009	Tokyo, Japan	14–0	China	2009 World Baseball Classic	(silver) 2nd
Mar 21, 2009	Los Angeles, California	10–2	Venezuela	2009 World Baseball Classic	(silver) 2nd
Nov 19, 2010	Guangzhou, China	9–3	Chinese Taipei	2010 Asian Games	(gold) 1st
Mar 3, 2013	Taichung, Taiwan	0–5	Netherlands	2013 World Baseball Classic	9th
Mar 4, 2013	Taichung, Taiwan	6–0	Australia	2013 World Baseball Classic	9th
Mar 5, 2013	Taichung, Taiwan	3-2	Chinese Taipei	2013 World Baseball Classic	9th
Sep 27, 2014	Incheon, South Korea	7-2	China	2014 Asian Games	(gold) 1st
Sep 28, 2014	Incheon, South Korea	6–3	Chinese Taipei	2014 Asian Games	(gold) 1st
Nov 19, 2015	Tokyo, Japan	4–3	Japan	2015 WBSC Premier 12	(gold) 1st

== See also ==
- South Korea national under-18 baseball team
