= Yu-Min Lin =

Taiwanese baseball player (born 2003)

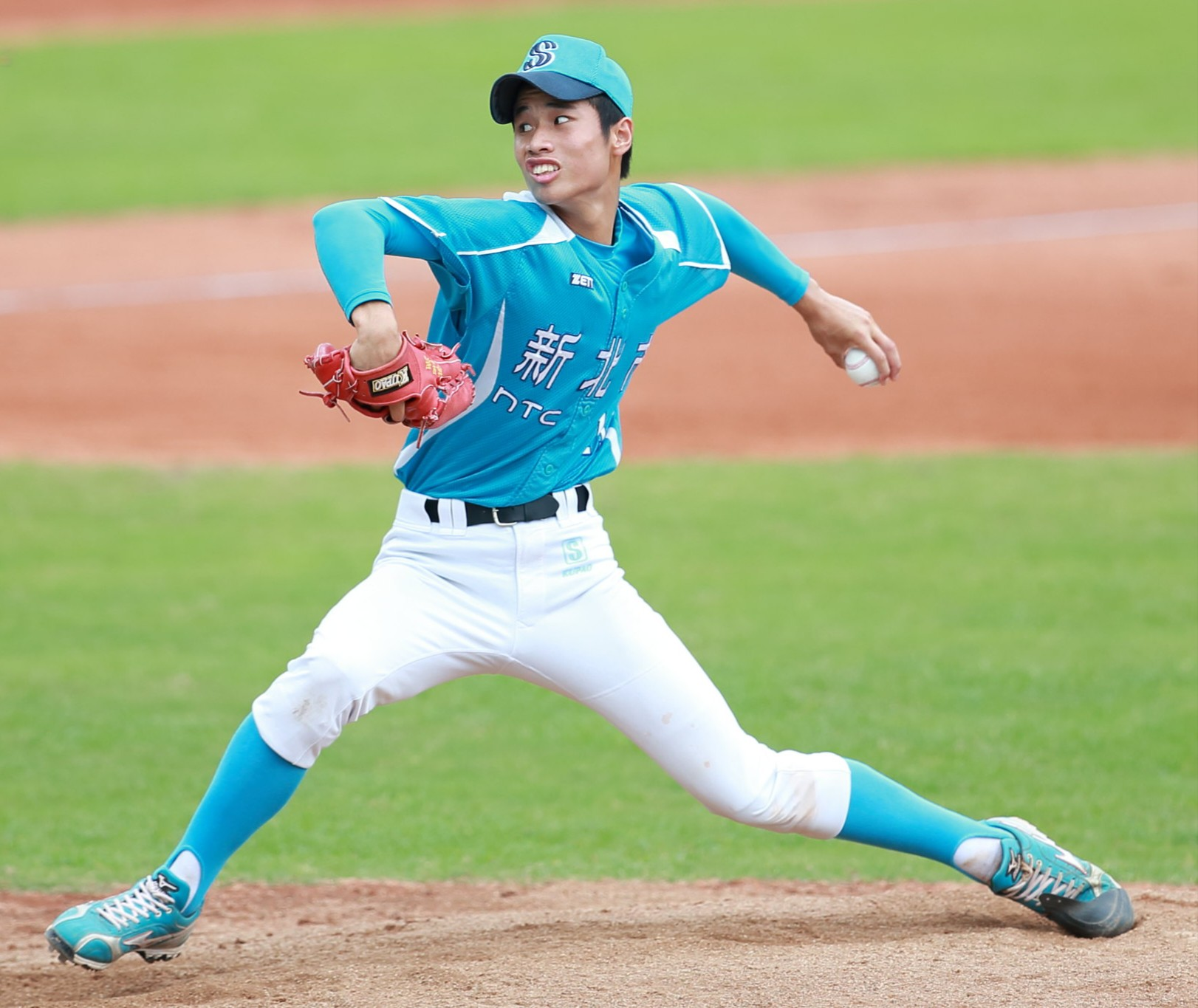
- Lin pitching for Ku-Pao Home Economics & Commercial High School in 2019

Arizona Diamondbacks – No. 89
- Pitcher
- Born: July 12, 2003 (age 23); Taitung County, Taiwan
- Bats: Left Throws: Left
- Stats at Baseball Reference
Medals
Men's baseball
Representing Chinese Taipei
Asian Games
Silver medal – second place	2022 Hangzhou	Team
WBSC Premier12
Gold medal – first place	2024	Team
U-15 Baseball World Cup
Bronze medal – third place	2018 Panama	Team

Yu-Min Lin (Chinese: 林昱珉; born July 12, 2003) is a Taiwanese professional baseball pitcher in the Arizona Diamondbacks organization.

== Personal life ==
Lin was born in Taitung County on July 12, 2003. He is of Amis descent. His older brother, Chen Wei-hao, plays for the Wei Chuan Dragons of the Chinese Professional Baseball League (CPBL).

== Career ==
Lin was signed by the Arizona Diamondbacks on February 16, 2022. He made his professional debut with the Rookie-level Arizona Complex League Diamondbacks and was promoted to the Low-A Visalia Rawhide and finished the season with a 2–2 record and a 2.72 ERA with 91 strikeouts over 14 starts. Lin began the 2023 season with the High-A Hillsboro Hops, and was the youngest player on the Hops roster. Prior to the 2024 season, Lin was invited to spring training for the first time in his career. Lin joined the Glendale Desert Dogs of the Arizona Fall League at the end of the regular season.

== International career ==
He has played on the Taiwanese national team (Chinese Taipei) in multiple international tournaments, including the World Baseball Softball Confederation U-12 Baseball World Cup, U-15 Baseball World Cup, U-18 Baseball World Cup, and U-23 Baseball World Cup. He started two games for Taiwan's silver-medal run during the 2022 Asian Games, pitching to a 1–1 record with a 1.64 ERA and eleven strikeouts to three walks in eleven innings.

Lin started in the 2024 WBSC Premier12 final in a 4–0 against Japan, where he pitched 4 scoreless innings, ending Japan's 27-game-win streak and winning Taiwan their first ever major international tournament.

Lin was selected to play in the 2026 World Baseball Classic, where he pitched 2.1 scoreless innings of relief against the Czech Republic.

== Pitching style ==
As of the 2023 season, Lin throws a soft slider, a mid- to upper 80s fastball with arm side precision, and a changeup.
