= Kim Hyung-jun (baseball) =

South Korean baseball player (born 1999)

NC Dinos – No. 25
- Catcher
- Born: November 2, 1999 (age 26); Seoul, South Korea
- Bats: Right Throws: Right

KBO debut
- June 28, 2018, for the NC Dinos

KBO statistics (through 2025)
- Batting average: .219
- Home runs: 46
- Runs batted in: 140
- Stats at Baseball Reference

Teams
- NC Dinos (2018–present)
Medals
Men's baseball
Representing South Korea
Asian Games
Gold medal – first place	2022 Hangzhou	Team

Kim Hyung-jun (Korean: 김형준; born November 2, 1999) is a South Korean professional baseball player for the NC Dinos of the KBO League. Kim appeared in five baseball contests during the 2022 Asian Games, and won a gold medal for South Korea. In 2026, he appeared in two games in the 2026 World Baseball Classic, in which South Korea was defeated by the Dominican Republic in the quarterfinal round.
