= Moon Dong-ju =

South Korean baseball player (born 2003)

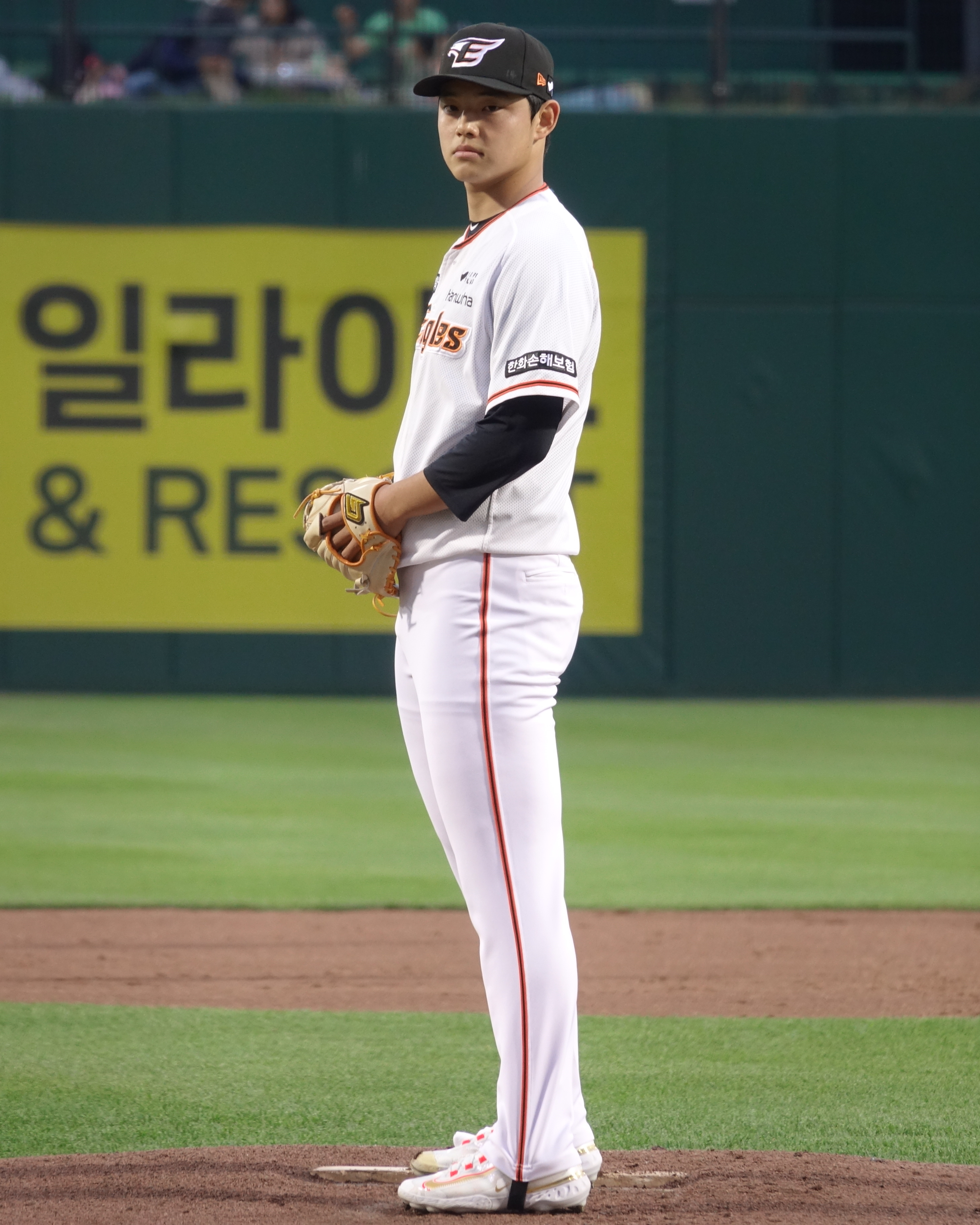

Hanwha Eagles – No. 1
- Pitcher
- Born: December 23, 2003 (age 22); Gwangju, South Korea
- Bats: Right Throws: Right

KBO debut
- May 10, 2022, for the Hanwha Eagles

KBO statistics (through 2025 season)
- Win–loss record: 27–23
- Earned run average: 4.39
- Strikeouts: 362
- Stats at Baseball Reference

Teams
- Hanwha Eagles (2022–present)

Career highlights and awards
- KBO Rookie of the Year (2023)
Medals
Men's baseball
Representing South Korea
Asian Games
Gold medal – first place	2022 Hangzhou	Team

Moon Dong-ju (Korean: 문동주; born December 23, 2003) is a South Korean professional baseball player for the Hanwha Eagles of the KBO League. Moon appeared in one baseball contest during the 2022 Asian Games, winning a gold medal for South Korea.
