= Park Yeong-hyun =

South Korean baseball player (born 2003)

KT Wiz – No. 60
- Pitcher
- Born: October 11, 2003 (age 22); Gurye, South Korea
- Bats: Right Throws: Right

KBO debut
- April 3, 2022, for the KT Wiz

KBO statistics (through 2025 season)
- Win–loss record: 18–12
- Earned run average: 3.30
- Strikeouts: 298
- Stats at Baseball Reference

Teams
- KT Wiz (2022–present)

Park Yeong-hyun (Korean: 박영현; born October 11, 2003, in Gurye, South Jeolla) is a South Korean pitcher for the KT Wiz in the Korea Baseball Organization (KBO).

Park appeared in four baseball contests during the 2022 Asian Games, recording 5 1/3 innings pitched, eight strikeouts, two saves, and winning a gold medal for South Korea.
