= Pingtan, Dazhou =

Pingtan 平滩镇
- Town
- Location in Sichuan
- Coordinates: 30°56′12″N 107°30′26″E
- Country: People's Republic of China
- Province: Sichuan
- Prefecture-level city: Dazhou
- District: Dachuan District
- Time zone: UTC+8 (China Standard)

Pingtan (Chinese: 平滩; pinyin: Píngtān) is a town in Dachuan District, Dazhou, Sichuan province, China.

As of 2020, it administers Pingtan Residential Community and the following five villages:

- Beiyakou Village (碑垭口村)
- Dinglong Village (定龙村)
- Shuitongba Village (水桐坝村)
- Shifeng Village (石峰村)
- Jingu Village (金鼓村)

== See also ==
- List of township-level divisions of Sichuan
