= Noh Kyung-eun =

South Korean baseball player

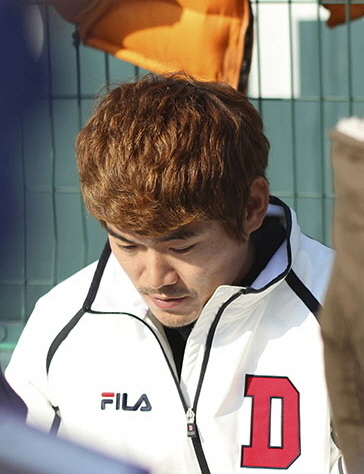

SSG Landers – No. 38
- Pitcher
- Born: March 11, 1984 (age 41); Hampyeong, South Korea
- Bats: Right Throws: Right

KBO debut
- 2003, for the Doosan Bears

KBO statistics (through 2025)
- Win–loss record: 89–101
- Earned run average: 4.71
- Strikeouts: 1064
- Stats at Baseball Reference

Teams
- Doosan Bears (2003–2016); Lotte Giants (2016–2021); SSG Landers (2022–present)

- Noh Kyung-eun
- Hangul: 노경은
- Hanja: 盧景銀
- RR: No Gyeongeun
- MR: No Kyŏngŭn

Noh Kyung-eun (born March 11, 1984) is a South Korean professional baseball pitcher for the SSG Landers of the KBO League. He has previously played for the Doosan Bears and Lotte Giants.

== Career ==
He represented the South Korea national baseball team at the 2013 World Baseball Classic.

After the end of the 2018 season, he qualified for the FA, but failed to save the team for a year after breaking up with his team. Then, he signed with Lotte Giants for two years and 1.1 billion won ahead of the 2020 season.

Noh was named a KBO All-Star for the first time in his career in 2023.

== Filmography ==
=== Television show ===
Year	Title	Role	Ref.
2023	Golf Match Swing Star	Contestant	
