= Baseball at the 2006 Asian Games =

- Venue: Al-Rayyan Baseball & Softball Venue
- Dates: 29 November – 7 December 2006
- Competitors: 125 from 6 nations

Baseball was one of the many sports which was held at the 2006 Asian Games in Al-Rayyan, Qatar beginning on November 29, 2006. Six East and Southeast Asian nations participated in the tournament. Chinese Taipei won its first ever baseball gold medal in the Asian Games when they mounted a ninth inning comeback against Japan in the final game of round robin play. All games in the baseball competition were held at the Al-Rayyan Sports Club.

== Schedule ==
●	Round	●	Last round

Event↓/Date →	29th Wed	30th Thu	1st Fri	2nd Sat	3rd Sun	4th Mon	5th Tue	6th Wed	7th Thu
Men	●	●		●	●	●	●	●	●

== Medalists ==
Event	Gold	Silver	Bronze
Men	Chinese Taipei; Yu Hsien-ming; Hu Chin-lung; Yang Chung-shou; Chen Yung-chi; Lee Chen-chang; Lin Yueh-ping; Pan Wei-lun; Lin Wei-chu; Yeh Chun-chang; Wang Chuan-chia; Lin Chih-sheng; Shih Chih-wei; Chen Feng-min; Tseng Sung-wei; Chang Tai-shan; Chen Chin-feng; Hsieh Chia-hsien; Kuo Hong-chih; Chang Chien-ming; Chiang Chien-ming; Keng Po-hsuan; Lin Ko-chien	Japan; Koichi Fukuda; Kanya Suzuki; Hisayoshi Chono; Yosuke Shinomiya; Yasuyuki Saigo; Keiji Ikebe; Kei Nomoto; Kenichi Yokoyama; Takeshi Koyama; Yasutaka Hattori; Naoki Miyanishi; Takuya Ishiguro; Shoji Saeki; Kentaro Takasaki; Hideto Isomura; Satoshi Komatsu; Kohei Hasebe; Daisuke Tanaka; Kenji Suzuki; Kosuke Ueyama; Shigeki Nakano; Takashi Yoshiura	South Korea; Jang Sung-ho; Park Jin-man; Jeong Keun-woo; Lee Byung-kyu; Lee Dae-ho; Lee Yong-kyu; Park Ki-hyuk; Yoon Suk-min; Oh Seung-hwan; Shin Chul-in; Lee Taek-keun; Lee Jin-young; Jung Min-hyuk; Cho In-sung; Kang Min-ho; Ryu Hyun-jin; Jang Won-sam; Lee Hei-chun; Son Min-han; Park Jae-hong; Cho Dong-chan; Woo Kyu-min

== Squads ==
Squads

China	Chinese Taipei	Japan	Philippines
Li Lei; Zhang Yufeng; Zhao Quansheng; Hou Fenglian; Lü Jiangang; Li Tao; Sun Wei; Zhang Li; Guo Youhua; Yang Shuo; Chen Kun; Liu Guangbiao; Zhu Wanyun; Wang Wei; Chen Junyi; Zhang Wanjun; Zhang Hongbo; Bu Tao; Lai Guojun	Yu Hsien-ming; Hu Chin-lung; Yang Chung-shou; Chen Yung-chi; Lee Chen-chang; Lin Yueh-ping; Pan Wei-lun; Lin Wei-chu; Yeh Chun-chang; Wang Chuan-chia; Lin Chih-sheng; Shih Chih-wei; Chen Feng-min; Tseng Sung-wei; Chang Tai-shan; Chen Chin-feng; Hsieh Chia-hsien; Kuo Hong-chih; Chang Chien-ming; Chiang Chien-ming; Keng Po-hsuan; Lin Ko-chien	Koichi Fukuda; Kanya Suzuki; Hisayoshi Chono; Yosuke Shinomiya; Yasuyuki Saigo; Keiji Ikebe; Kei Nomoto; Kenichi Yokoyama; Takeshi Koyama; Yasutaka Hattori; Naoki Miyanishi; Takuya Ishiguro; Shoji Saeki; Kentaro Takasaki; Hideto Isomura; Satoshi Komatsu; Kohei Hasebe; Daisuke Tanaka; Kenji Suzuki; Kosuke Ueyama; Shigeki Nakano; Takashi Yoshiura	Charlie Labrador; Junnifer Pinero; Alejandro Velasquez; Rommel Roja; Ferdinand Recto; Roy Baclay; Ruben Angeles; Wilfredo Hidalgo; Ernesto Binarao; Virgilio Roxas; Jonash Ponce; Nino Tator; Joseph Orillana; Ruel Batuto; Darwin dela Calzada; Edmer del Socorro; Roel Empacis; Fulgencio Rances
South Korea	Thailand		
Jang Sung-ho; Park Jin-man; Jeong Keun-woo; Lee Byung-kyu; Lee Dae-ho; Lee Yong-kyu; Park Ki-hyuk; Yoon Suk-min; Oh Seung-hwan; Shin Chul-in; Lee Taek-keun; Lee Jin-young; Jung Min-hyuk; Cho In-sung; Kang Min-ho; Ryu Hyun-jin; Jang Won-sam; Lee Hei-chun; Son Min-han; Park Jae-hong; Cho Dong-chan; Woo Kyu-min	Ekkapong Kaewnun; Wachira Tongthong; Tibbadin Arjarayangkool; Nathaphong Phosringam; Nirun Jaroenkitsiriwong; Apichat Ngamying; Jatsada Kampitug; Panya Prayonghom; Jirapod Srisaipet; Chidsanu Janrak; Anukul Sudsawad; Kamolphan Kanjanavisut; Nattapong Sampahangsit; Teerasak Kongsabai; Arthit Changthed; Chanatip Thongbai; Suthikiat Bunnam; Krissada Heebthong; Sakda Nontachai; Yannapat Arpornsiri; Suparach Teepakakorn; Kittiphon Mekmahasachan		

== Results ==
All times are Arabia Standard Time (UTC+03:00)

Pos	Team	Pld	W	L	RF	RA	PCT	GB
1	Chinese Taipei	5	5	0	47	11	1.000	—
2	Japan	5	4	1	56	17	.800	1
3	South Korea	5	3	2	45	19	.600	2
4	China	5	2	3	23	37	.400	3
5	Thailand	5	1	4	10	39	.200	4
6	Philippines	5	0	5	9	67	.000	5

Source: Official website

29 November; 9:00	China	4–1	Thailand	Al-Rayyan Baseball & Softball Venue, Al-Rayyan; Umpires: Hwang Suk-man (KOR)
29 November; 9:00	WP: Lai Guojun		LP: Krissada Heebthong	Al-Rayyan Baseball & Softball Venue, Al-Rayyan; Umpires: Hwang Suk-man (KOR)
29 November; 9:00	HR: Zhang Yufeng (1)			Al-Rayyan Baseball & Softball Venue, Al-Rayyan; Umpires: Hwang Suk-man (KOR)

Team	1	2	3	4	5	6	7	8	9	R	H	E
Thailand	0	0	0	0	0	1	0	0	0	1	5	1
China	0	0	0	3	0	0	0	1	X	4	8	3

29 November; 13:30	Philippines	2–17 (F/5)	Japan	Al-Rayyan Baseball & Softball Venue, Al-Rayyan; Umpires: Chen Minggao (CHN)
29 November; 13:30	LP: Charlie Labrador		WP: Takuya Ishiguro	Al-Rayyan Baseball & Softball Venue, Al-Rayyan; Umpires: Chen Minggao (CHN)
29 November; 13:30			HR: Kenji Suzuki (1)	Al-Rayyan Baseball & Softball Venue, Al-Rayyan; Umpires: Chen Minggao (CHN)

Team	1	2	3	4	5	6	7	8	9	R	H	E
Japan	8	1	1	7	0	—	—	—	—	17	14	0
Philippines	0	0	0	2	0	—	—	—	—	2	3	1

30 November; 9:00	South Korea	2–4	Chinese Taipei	Al-Rayyan Baseball & Softball Venue, Al-Rayyan; Umpires: Keisuke Kotani (JPN)
30 November; 9:00	LP: Son Min-han		WP: Kuo Hong-chih	Al-Rayyan Baseball & Softball Venue, Al-Rayyan; Umpires: Keisuke Kotani (JPN)
30 November; 9:00			HR: Chen Yung-chi (2), Hsieh Chia-hsien (1)	Al-Rayyan Baseball & Softball Venue, Al-Rayyan; Umpires: Keisuke Kotani (JPN)

Team	1	2	3	4	5	6	7	8	9	R	H	E
Chinese Taipei	0	0	0	2	1	0	0	1	0	4	10	2
South Korea	0	0	0	1	0	1	0	0	0	2	11	0

30 November; 13:30	Philippines	4–15 (F/7)	China	Al-Rayyan Baseball & Softball Venue, Al-Rayyan; Umpires: Katsuhito Koyama (JPN)
30 November; 13:30	LP: Ernesto Binarao		WP: Zhang Wanjun	Al-Rayyan Baseball & Softball Venue, Al-Rayyan; Umpires: Katsuhito Koyama (JPN)
30 November; 13:30			HR: Wang Wei (1)	Al-Rayyan Baseball & Softball Venue, Al-Rayyan; Umpires: Katsuhito Koyama (JPN)

Team	1	2	3	4	5	6	7	8	9	R	H	E
China	0	4	3	2	6	0	0	—	—	15	17	1
Philippines	0	0	0	2	0	2	0	—	—	4	8	2

2 December; 9:00	Japan	10–7	South Korea	Al-Rayyan Baseball & Softball Venue, Al-Rayyan; Umpires: Huang Po-sung (TPE)
2 December; 9:00	WP: Hideto Isomura		LP: Oh Seung-hwan	Al-Rayyan Baseball & Softball Venue, Al-Rayyan; Umpires: Huang Po-sung (TPE)
2 December; 9:00	HR: Hisayoshi Chono (1), Takashi Yoshiura (1), Yasuyuki Saigo (1)		HR: Lee Dae-ho (1)	Al-Rayyan Baseball & Softball Venue, Al-Rayyan; Umpires: Huang Po-sung (TPE)

Team	1	2	3	4	5	6	7	8	9	R	H	E
South Korea	0	0	4	0	1	0	0	2	0	7	9	2
Japan	0	0	5	2	0	0	0	0	3	10	11	2

2 December; 14:00	Thailand	0–16 (F/5)	Chinese Taipei	Al-Rayyan Baseball & Softball Venue, Al-Rayyan; Umpires: Sim Tae-seuk (KOR)
2 December; 14:00	LP: Chanatip Thongbai		WP: Lin Yueh-ping	Al-Rayyan Baseball & Softball Venue, Al-Rayyan; Umpires: Sim Tae-seuk (KOR)
2 December; 14:00			HR: Chang Chien-ming (1), Chen Chin-feng (1), Chen Feng-min (1)	Al-Rayyan Baseball & Softball Venue, Al-Rayyan; Umpires: Sim Tae-seuk (KOR)

Team	1	2	3	4	5	6	7	8	9	R	H	E
Chinese Taipei	3	0	9	0	4	—	—	—	—	16	21	0
Thailand	0	0	0	0	0	—	—	—	—	0	0	3

3 December; 9:00	South Korea	12–2 (F/7)	Philippines	Al-Rayyan Baseball & Softball Venue, Al-Rayyan; Umpires: Chainarong Nootsuphap (THA)
3 December; 9:00	WP: Jang Won-sam		LP: Darwin dela Calzada	Al-Rayyan Baseball & Softball Venue, Al-Rayyan; Umpires: Chainarong Nootsuphap (THA)
3 December; 9:00	HR: Cho Dong-chan (1), Lee Dae-ho (1), Lee Jin-young (1)			Al-Rayyan Baseball & Softball Venue, Al-Rayyan; Umpires: Chainarong Nootsuphap (THA)

Team	1	2	3	4	5	6	7	8	9	R	H	E
Philippines	0	0	1	0	0	0	1	—	—	2	2	0
South Korea	3	4	2	2	0	0	1	—	—	12	12	1

3 December; 13:30	China	0–16 (F/5)	Japan	Al-Rayyan Baseball & Softball Venue, Al-Rayyan; Umpires: Hwang Suk-man (KOR)
3 December; 13:30	LP: Chen Junyi		WP: Takuya Ishiguro	Al-Rayyan Baseball & Softball Venue, Al-Rayyan; Umpires: Hwang Suk-man (KOR)
3 December; 13:30			HR: Kosuke Ueyama (1)	Al-Rayyan Baseball & Softball Venue, Al-Rayyan; Umpires: Hwang Suk-man (KOR)

Team	1	2	3	4	5	6	7	8	9	R	H	E
Japan	0	2	9	0	5	—	—	—	—	16	16	0
China	0	0	0	0	0	—	—	—	—	0	0	0

4 December; 9:00	Chinese Taipei	4–2	China	Al-Rayyan Baseball & Softball Venue, Al-Rayyan; Umpires: Sim Tae-seuk (KOR)
4 December; 9:00	WP: Tseng Sung-wei		LP: Guo Youhua	Al-Rayyan Baseball & Softball Venue, Al-Rayyan; Umpires: Sim Tae-seuk (KOR)
4 December; 9:00	HR: Chang Tai-shan (1), Chen Chin-feng (1)		HR: Zhang Hongbo (1)	Al-Rayyan Baseball & Softball Venue, Al-Rayyan; Umpires: Sim Tae-seuk (KOR)

Team	1	2	3	4	5	6	7	8	9	R	H	E
China	0	0	1	0	0	0	1	0	0	2	6	1
Chinese Taipei	0	1	2	0	0	0	0	1	X	4	8	0

4 December; 13:30	Thailand	1–12 (F/8)	South Korea	Al-Rayyan Baseball & Softball Venue, Al-Rayyan; Umpires: Hsu Ching-hsiang (TPE)
4 December; 13:30	LP: Chanatip Thongbai		WP: Lee Hei-chun	Al-Rayyan Baseball & Softball Venue, Al-Rayyan; Umpires: Hsu Ching-hsiang (TPE)
4 December; 13:30			HR: Jang Sung-ho (1)	Al-Rayyan Baseball & Softball Venue, Al-Rayyan; Umpires: Hsu Ching-hsiang (TPE)

Team	1	2	3	4	5	6	7	8	9	R	H	E
South Korea	1	4	1	1	1	0	2	2	—	12	14	2
Thailand	0	0	0	0	0	0	1	0	—	1	5	2

5 December; 9:00	Japan	6–0	Thailand	Al-Rayyan Baseball & Softball Venue, Al-Rayyan; Umpires: Catalino Leron (PHI)
5 December; 9:00	WP: Naoki Miyanishi		LP: Krissada Heebthong	Al-Rayyan Baseball & Softball Venue, Al-Rayyan; Umpires: Catalino Leron (PHI)

Team	1	2	3	4	5	6	7	8	9	R	H	E
Thailand	0	0	0	0	0	0	0	0	0	0	4	2
Japan	0	2	0	0	0	0	4	0	X	6	9	1

5 December; 13:30	Chinese Taipei	15–0 (F/5)	Philippines	Al-Rayyan Baseball & Softball Venue, Al-Rayyan; Umpires: Katsuhito Koyama (JPN)
5 December; 13:30	WP: Lin Ko-chien		LP: Charlie Labrador	Al-Rayyan Baseball & Softball Venue, Al-Rayyan; Umpires: Katsuhito Koyama (JPN)
5 December; 13:30	HR: Chen Yung-chi (1), Lin Chih-sheng (1)			Al-Rayyan Baseball & Softball Venue, Al-Rayyan; Umpires: Katsuhito Koyama (JPN)

Team	1	2	3	4	5	6	7	8	9	R	H	E
Philippines	0	0	0	0	0	—	—	—	—	0	4	2
Chinese Taipei	7	1	0	5	2	—	—	—	—	15	17	1

6 December; 9:00	Philippines	1–8	Thailand	Al-Rayyan Baseball & Softball Venue, Al-Rayyan; Umpires: Hsu Ching-hsiang (TPE)
6 December; 9:00	LP: Darwin dela Calzada		WP: Krissada Heebthong	Al-Rayyan Baseball & Softball Venue, Al-Rayyan; Umpires: Hsu Ching-hsiang (TPE)

Team	1	2	3	4	5	6	7	8	9	R	H	E
Thailand	0	0	0	1	0	0	0	0	7	8	11	2
Philippines	0	0	0	0	0	1	0	0	0	1	8	1

6 December; 13:30	South Korea	12–2 (F/7)	China	Al-Rayyan Baseball & Softball Venue, Al-Rayyan; Umpires: Catalino Leron (PHI)
6 December; 13:30	WP: Woo Kyu-min		LP: Chen Junyi	Al-Rayyan Baseball & Softball Venue, Al-Rayyan; Umpires: Catalino Leron (PHI)
6 December; 13:30			HR: Wang Wei (1)	Al-Rayyan Baseball & Softball Venue, Al-Rayyan; Umpires: Catalino Leron (PHI)

Team	1	2	3	4	5	6	7	8	9	R	H	E
China	0	0	0	2	0	0	0	—	—	2	5	4
South Korea	3	3	2	0	1	1	2	—	—	12	15	0

7 December; 11:15	Chinese Taipei	8–7	Japan	Al-Rayyan Baseball & Softball Venue, Al-Rayyan; Umpires: Hwang Suk-man (KOR)
7 December; 11:15	WP: Tseng Sung-wei		LP: Kentaro Takasaki	Al-Rayyan Baseball & Softball Venue, Al-Rayyan; Umpires: Hwang Suk-man (KOR)
7 December; 11:15			HR: Takashi Yoshiura (1)	Al-Rayyan Baseball & Softball Venue, Al-Rayyan; Umpires: Hwang Suk-man (KOR)

Team	1	2	3	4	5	6	7	8	9	R	H	E
Japan	1	2	0	0	0	1	1	2	0	7	11	2
Chinese Taipei	0	0	2	0	0	0	4	0	2	8	13	0

== Final standing ==
Rank	Team	Pld	W	L
1st place, gold medalist(s)	Chinese Taipei	5	5	0
2nd place, silver medalist(s)	Japan	5	4	1
3rd place, bronze medalist(s)	South Korea	5	3	2
4	China	5	2	3
5	Thailand	5	1	4
6	Philippines	5	0	5
