= Chang Chien-ming =

Taiwanese baseball player (born 1980)

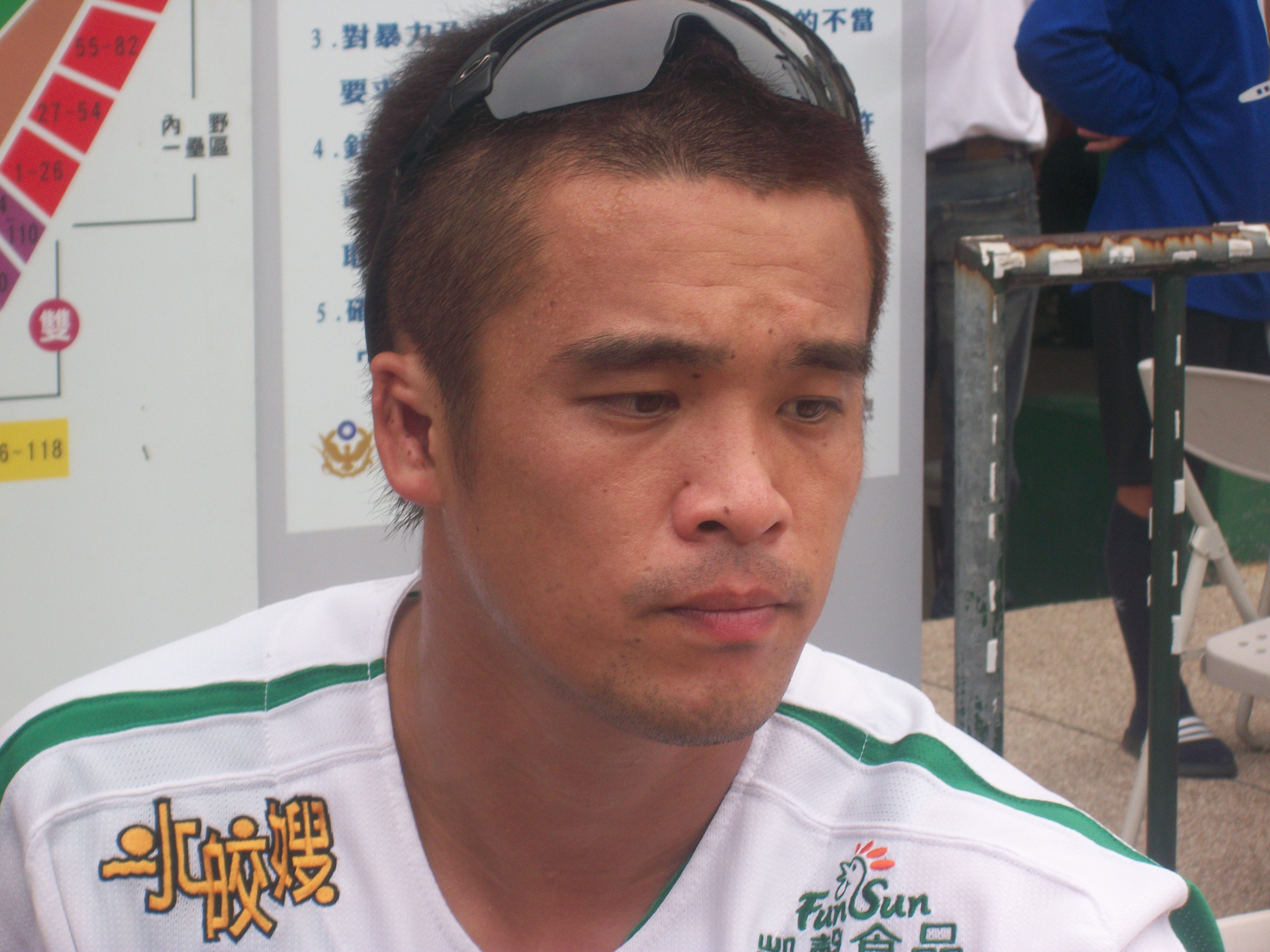

Wei Chuan Dragons – No. 66
- Outfielder / Coach
- Born: 27 July 1980 (age 45); Hualien County, Taiwan
- Bats: Left Throws: Left
- Stats at Baseball Reference

Teams
- As player: Sinon Bulls/EDA Rhinos/Fubon Guardians (2004–2019); As coach: Wei Chuan Dragons (2020–present)

Chang Chien-ming (Chinese: 張建銘; pinyin: Zhāng Jiànmíng; born 27 July 1980) is a Taiwanese former professional baseball outfielder. He played in the Chinese Professional Baseball League (CPBL) for the Sinon Bulls / EDA Rhinos / Fubon Guardians from 2004 to 2019.

== Career ==
Chang debuted with the Taiwan national baseball team when he was a teenager, going 4 for 20 with a double as the starting third baseman for Chinese Taipei in the 1999 Intercontinental Cup. He helped Taiwan win Gold in the 2001 Asian Baseball Championship. In the 2001 World Port Tournament, he hit .222/.243/.250 and was thrown out stealing in both attempts. He batted .294/.294/.294 in the 2002 Haarlem Baseball Week. In the 2002 World University Baseball Championship, he again played for Taiwan, hitting .286/.333/.357, stole 2 bases in 2 tries and had one outfield assist in four games. Chang hit .115/.258/.154 in the 2002 Intercontinental Cup as a regular corner outfielder.

In 2004, Chang made his professional debut with the Sinon Bulls and hit .291/.331/.366. He batted .283/.325/.364 and stole 21 bases in 28 tries in 2005; he was with Sinon as they won the CPBL title. He appeared in the first Konami Cup.

Chang made the Taiwan roster for the 2006 World Baseball Classic and went 4 for 11 with a walk and a double as one of their better performers. In the 2006 CPBL campaign, he hit .284/.335/.365 and only stole 3 bases; the 21 in 2005 was the only time in his first four seasons that he reached double digits in swipes. He was with Taiwan for the 2006 Asian Games and 2006 Intercontinental Cup. In the latter event, he hit .405/.463/.595 with 8 runs, 7 RBI and a surprising 2 home runs in nine games for Taiwan, acting as their main right fielder; Chang only has hit 8 home runs in his first 1,107 at-bats in the CPBL. He tied Sharnol Adriana and Yoandry Urgellés for third in the 2006 Intercontinental Cup with 15 hits, trailing only Alexander Mayeta and Yung-Chi Chen. He tied 8 others, including former major leaguer Ivanon Coffie for second in home runs, trailing only Brad Harman. He failed to make the All-Tournament outfield as Urgellés, Giorvis Duvergel and Frederich Cepeda were chosen.

In the 2007 CPBL campaign, the outfielder batted .343/.389/.582 in 21 games for Sinon, his playing time limited by left elbow surgery early in the year. He was back in action for the 2007 Asian Baseball Championship, going 2 for 11. He was one of the top hitters in the 2008 Final Olympic Qualification Tournament, batting .480/.581/.640 to help Taiwan earn a spot in the 2008 Summer Olympics. He tied Tom Brice and Matt Rogelstad for third in the event with 9 runs, trailing Yong-kyu Lee and Young-min Ko. He was 4th in average behind Joo-chan Kim, Jimmy Van Ostrand and Luke Hughes.

As the starting Taiwan right fielder, Chang hit .154/.233/.192 in the 2008 Olympics and made a throwing error that allowed Wei Sun to score the winning run in Taiwan's stunning loss to China.

He also played for Taiwan in the 2013 World Baseball Classic.
