= Lee Jin-young =

South Korean baseball player and coach

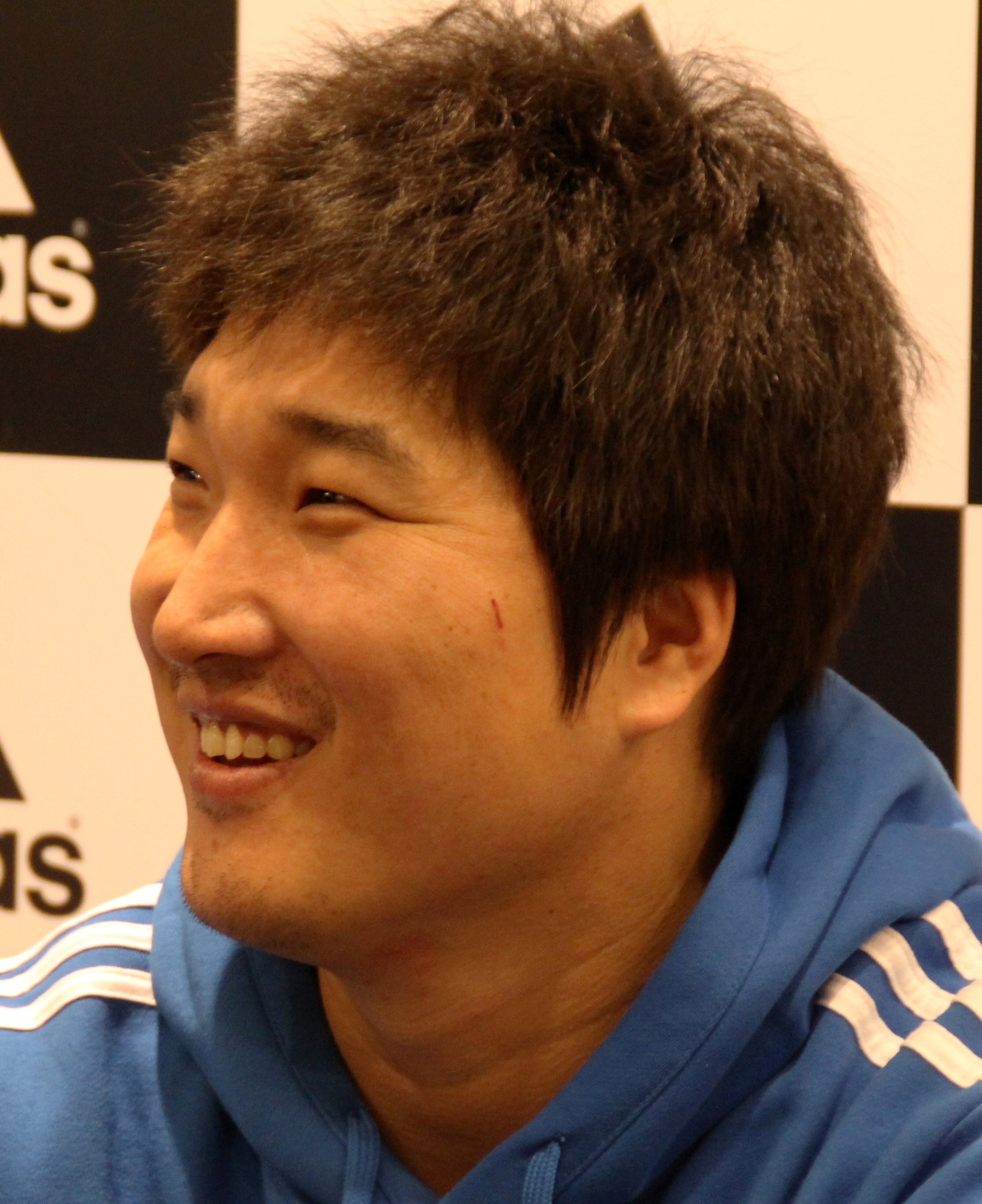

Doosan Bears – No. 75
- Right fielder
- Born: June 15, 1980 (age 46); Gunsan, North Jeolla Province, South Korea
- Batted: Left Threw: Left

KBO debut
- May 10, 1999, for the Ssangbangwool Raiders

Last KBO appearance
- October 13, 2018, for the KT Wiz

KBO statistics (through 2011)
- Batting average: .302
- Home runs: 132
- RBI: 616
- Stats at Baseball Reference

Career highlights and awards
- KBO League Golden Glove Award (2004); As player: Ssangbangwool Raiders (1999); SK Wyverns (2000–2008); LG Twins (2009–2015); KT Wiz (2016–2018); As coach: Tohoku Rakuten Golden Eagles (2019); SSG Landers (2020-2023); Samsung Lions (2024-2025); Doosan Bears (2026-)
Medals
Representing South Korea
Men's baseball
World Baseball Classic
Silver medal – second place	2009 Los Angeles	Team
Olympics
Gold medal – first place	2008 Beijing	Team
Intercontinental Cup
Silver medal – second place	2002 Havana	Team
Asian Games
Bronze medal – third place	2006 Al-Rayyan	Team
Asian Baseball Championship
Bronze medal – third place	2003 Sapporo	Team
Asian Junior Baseball Championship
Bronze medal – third place	1998 Japan	Team

- Lee Jin-young
- Hangul: 이진영
- Hanja: 李晋暎
- RR: I Jinyeong
- MR: I Chinyŏng

Lee Jin-young (Korean: 이진영; Hanja: 李晋暎; born June 15, 1980 in Gunsan, North Jeolla Province, South Korea) is a South Korean former right fielder. He batted and threw left-handed. He is now a coach for the Doosan Bears.

== Career ==
=== Amateur career ===
Attending Gunsan Commerce High School in Gunsan, North Jeolla Province, Lee was considered the best high school hitter. He was also a highly regarded left-handed power pitcher who threw in the mid-90s as a starter. In 1997, he was selected for the South Korea national junior team that finished in 5th place at the 1997 World Junior Baseball Championship held in Moncton, New Brunswick, Canada.

=== Professional career ===
==== SK Wyverns ====
Upon graduation from Gunsan High School, Lee was drafted by the Ssangbangwool Raiders, which became the SK Wyverns after the 1999 season, in the first round of the 1999 KBO Draft. Lee made his debut in the pro league against the Hanwha Eagles in Gunsan on May 10, 1999. Appearing in 65 games, he finished his rookie year in 1999 with a .258 batting average, 4 home runs and 13 RBIs.

Next season, Lee became a fixture in right field for the SK Wyverns, appearing in 105 games. However, his batting average dipped to .245, stealing a career-low 2 bases.

In 2001, Lee bounced back from the sophomore slump, batting a respectable .280 with 90 hits, 7 home runs, 16 doubles and 9 stolen bases.

From 2002 through 2004, he notched three consecutive seasons batting .300+, and won his first KBO League Golden Glove Award in 2004.

In addition to his batting, Lee a left-handed player and former pitching prospect has been noted for his defensive work in right field, regularly recording outfield assists. During the 2006 World Baseball Classic, his fielding received broader attention, including several difficult catches and assists during the tournament.

In the 2007 KBO season, he missed over 40 regular-season games due to injuries, but batted a career-high .350 with 77 hits in 220 at-bats.

In 2008, Lee was placed on the disabled list again and missed 30 games during the season, but batted .300-plus again (.315) with 102 hits in 324 at-bats, compiling 8 home runs, 53 RBIs and a career-high 12 stolen bases.

==== LG Twins ====
Lee became a free agent after the 2008 season and signed a one-year deal with the LG Twins on November 20, 2008.

=== Coaching career ===
On April 5, 2019, he joined the Tohoku Rakuten Golden Eagles of Nippon Professional Baseball (NPB) as a trainee coach.

== International career ==
Lee was selected South Korea national baseball team at the 1998 Asian Junior Baseball Championship, 2002 Intercontinental Cup, 2003 Asian Baseball Championship, 2006 2006 Asian Games, 2008 Summer Olympics and 2009 World Baseball Classic.

At the 2009 World Baseball Classic, Lee batted .250 and drove in 7 runs, appearing in all 9 games. In the Team Korea's first game against Chinese Taipei, he smacked a grand slam in the first inning off the Cleveland Indians’ prospect Lee Chen-Chang to power Olympic champions Korea to a 9-0 win. In Round 2, Lee smacked a 2-RBI single off Yu Darvish in the top of the first inning to lead his team to a 4-1 victory over Japan, which assured South Korea a spot in the semifinals.
