= Park Ki-hyuck =

South Korean baseball player (born 1981)

KT Wiz – No. 76
- Shortstop
- Born: June 4, 1981 (age 45)
- Batted: Right Threw: Right

KBO debut
- April 11, 2000, for the Lotte Giants

Last appearance
- October 13, 2018, for the KT Wiz

KBO statistics
- Batting average: .244
- Home runs: 22
- RBI: 337
- Stats at Baseball Reference

Teams
- As player: Lotte Giants (2000–2014); KT Wiz (2015–2018); As coach: KT Wiz (2019–present)

Career highlights and awards
- KBO League Golden Glove Award (2008)

Park Ki-hyuck
Medal record

Men's baseball

Representing South Korea

World Baseball Classic
Silver medal – second place	2009 Los Angeles	Team

Asian Games
Bronze medal – third place	2006 Doha	Team

- Park Ki-hyuck
- Hangul: 박기혁
- Hanja: 朴基赫
- RR: Bak Gihyeok
- MR: Pak Kihyŏk

Park Ki-hyuck (Korean: 박기혁; Hanja: 朴基赫; born June 4, 1981, in Daegu, South Korea) is a retired South Korean shortstop. He was considered one of the top defensive shortstops (along with Park Jin-man) in the KBO League.

== Amateur career ==
Park attended Daegu Commerce High School in Daegu, South Korea. In 1999, he was named in South Korea national junior team's roster for the 1999 World Junior Baseball Championship. There Park led the attack alongside Choo Shin-soo and Jeong Keun-woo.

=== Notable international careers ===
Year	Venue	Competition	Team	Individual Note
1999	Chinese Taipei	World Junior Baseball Championship	5th	

== Professional career ==
Park made his pro debut in 2000, drafted by the Lotte Giants in the 2nd round (2nd pick) of the 2000 KBO draft. He had several mediocre seasons, but earned a starting position in the Giants' infield in the 2003 season, playing in 95 games.

Park participated in the 2006 KBO All-Star Game and 2006 Asian Games.

Though predominantly known as a light-hitting defensive infielder, Park had his most offensively productive season in 2008, when he hit .291 and posted career-highs in RBI (36), runs (47) and hits (102). After the end of the 2008 season, he won his first Golden Glove Award at shortstop.

In addition to achieving a level of personal success, Park was called up to the South Korea national baseball team for the 2009 World Baseball Classic. He was expected to serve as backup to another defensive wizard, Park Jin-man, for Team Korea. Park Jin-man, however, did not make the team because of an inflamed shoulder, and Park Ki-hyuck took over as the starting shortstop. Appearing in all nine games for South Korea, Park Ki-hyuck struggled at the plate, going just 3-for-26 with 3 walks, but he filled Park Jin-man's void at shortstop perfectly, making numerous acrobatic defensive plays in the field.

=== Awards and honors ===
- 2008 Golden Glove Award (SS)

=== Notable international careers ===
Year	Venue	Competition	Team	Individual Note
2006	Qatar	Asian Games	Bronze medal	.500 BA (3-for-6), 2 RBI, 5 R, 5 BB
2009	United States	World Baseball Classic	Silver medal	.115 BA (3-for-26), 4 RBI, 1 R, 3 BB
