= Chin-Feng Chen =

Taiwanese baseball player (born 1977)

Chen Chin-Feng
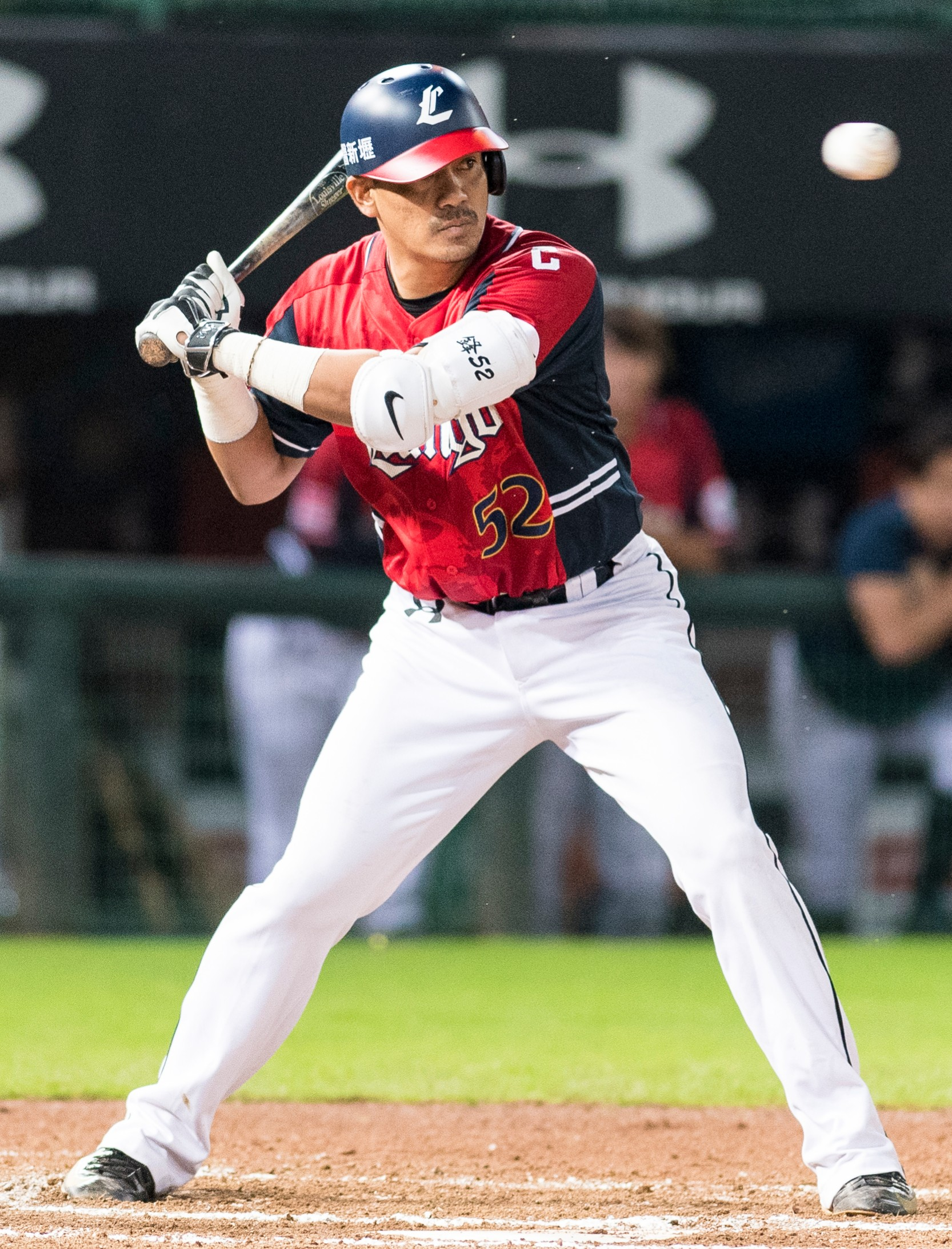
- Chen batting in his final CPBL game
- Outfielder
- Born: 28 October 1977 (age 48); Danei, Tainan, Taiwan
- Batted: Right Threw: Right

Professional debut
- MLB: September 14, 2002, for the Los Angeles Dodgers
- CPBL: March 21, 2006, for the La New Bears

Last appearance
- MLB: July 20, 2005, for the Los Angeles Dodgers
- CPBL: September 18, 2016, for the Lamigo Monkeys

MLB statistics
- Batting average: .091
- Hits: 2
- Runs batted in: 2

CPBL statistics
- Batting average: .304
- Home runs: 132
- Runs batted in: 490
- Stats at Baseball Reference

Teams
- Los Angeles Dodgers (2002–2005); La New Bears / Lamigo Monkeys (2006–2016)

Career highlights and awards
- MLB: First Taiwan-born player in Major League Baseball; CPBL: 4x Taiwan Series champion (2006, 2012, 2014–2015)
Medals
Representing Chinese Taipei
Men's baseball
Baseball World Cup
Bronze medal – third place	2001 Taipei	Team
Asian Games
Gold medal – first place	2006 Doha	Team
Asian Baseball Championship
Bronze medal – third place	1999 Seoul	Team
Silver medal – second place	2003 Sapporo	Team
Bronze medal – third place	2007 Taichung	Team

Chen Chin-feng (Chinese: 陳金鋒; pinyin: Chén Jīnfēng; Wade–Giles: Ch'en^{2} Chin^{1}-Feng^{1}; born 28 October 1977) is a former professional baseball outfielder. A Taiwanese aborigine of Siraya tribal ancestry, in 2002, he became the first player born in Taiwan to play in Major League Baseball. He is currently the manager for the Fubon Guardians of the Chinese Professional Baseball League.

== Playing career ==
In 1999 in the Cal League with Single-A San Bernardino Stampede in 1999, he batted .316/.404/.580 with 31 homers, 31 steals, 123 RBIs, and 75 walks. Along with outfielder Joc Pederson, who achieved the same feat in the Triple-A in 2014, Chen is one of only two Los Angeles Dodgers minor leaguers to have a 30 home run, 30 stolen bases season.

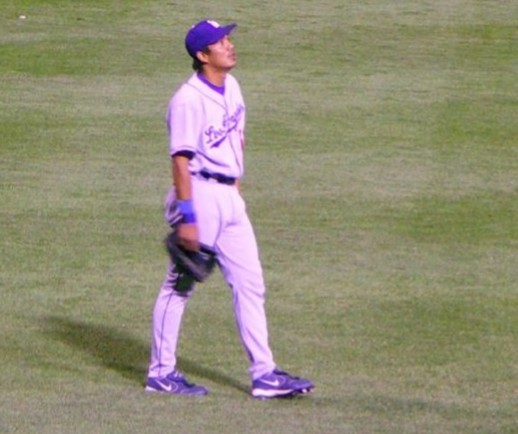
Chen playing for Los Angeles Dodgers in 2005

Chen became the first Taiwanese baseball player to play in Major League Baseball (MLB) when he made his debut on September 14, 2002. He played sparingly for the Los Angeles Dodgers in parts of the 2002–05 seasons. In 2005, Chen was reluctant to accept a designation for assignment back to the Dodgers' Las Vegas 51s Triple-A team and try out with another major league team.

In 2005, Chen was the first Taiwanese position player to ever get a hit in MLB, a 2-run RBI single off Colorado Rockies' reliever Bobby Seay. Pitcher Chin-hui Tsao had earlier become the first Taiwanese player to get a hit in the majors, with the Colorado Rockies on August 18, 2003.

After his contract with the Dodgers expired after the 2005 season, Chen announced on December 26, 2005, that he would not return to North America for the 2006 season but would instead enter the CPBL draft. In 2006, after struggling to make the 25-man roster with the Dodgers, Chen tried out for the Japanese professional league (NPB), and eventually decided to play in the Chinese Professional Baseball League (CPBL) in Taiwan.

He was promptly selected by the La New Bears as a designated hitter. Chen completed his first complete baseball season back home in Taiwan in 2006. He ranked first in many statistics, including batting average and 81 RBIs. He also led the Bears to the championship, and won his first MVP title for the final series matches.

In the 2007 Asian Baseball Championship, Chen homered off Yu Darvish of Japan, briefly giving Chinese Taipei a lead. Chen played well in the tournament and gained attention from several Japanese and Korean teams, including the Orix Buffaloes. However, Chen did not sign with them, and remained in Taiwan.

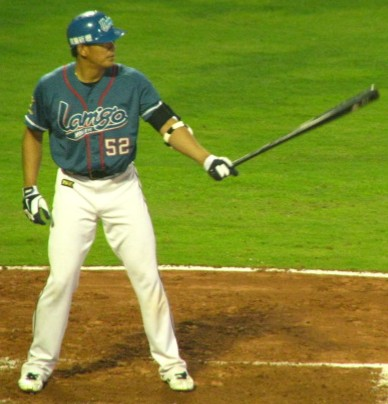
Chen in 2013

Chen announced his retirement from the CPBL on September 18, 2016. Following the end of his final match that day, Lamigo Monkeys retired his number, #52.

== Post-playing career ==
On March 24, 2017, the Fubon Guardians of the Chinese Professional Baseball League hired Chen as their vice general manager.

On December 30, 2023, the Guardians named Chen their manager.

== International career ==
Chen was selected to the Chinese Taipei national baseball team at the 1999 Asian Baseball Championship, 2001 Baseball World Cup, 2003 Asian Baseball Championship, 2004 Summer Olympics, 2006 Asian Games, 2007 Asian Baseball Championship, 2008 Summer Olympics Qualification Final Qualifying Tournament and 2016 exhibition games against Japan.

== Achievements ==
Chen was inducted into the Taiwan Baseball Hall of Fame in 2022.

Chen had two uniform numbers retired by professional teams. Lamigo Monkeys retired his number #52 in 2016, at the conclusion of his CPBL career. San Bernardino retired his number #43 in honor of his 30–30 season in 1999.

Chen hit the first grand slam in Konami Cup history in 2006.

== See also ==
- List of Major League Baseball players from Taiwan
