= Shim Soo-chang =

South Korean baseball player

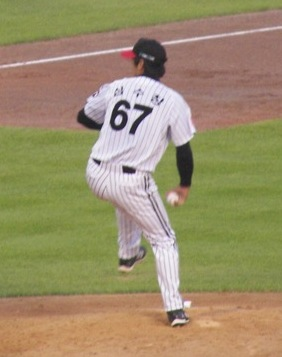
- 2004 in Jamsil Baseball Stadium

Hanwha Eagles – No. 1
- Relief pitcher
- Born: February 9, 1981 (age 44)
- Bats: Right Throws: Right

KBO debut
- May 10, 2004, LG Twins

KBO statistics (through 2019)
- Win–loss record: 42-68
- Saves: 14
- Holds: 24
- Earned run average: 5.37
- Strikeouts: 536

Teams
- LG Twins (2004–2011); Nexen Heroes (2011–2012); Lotte Giants (2014–2015); Hanwha Eagles (2016–2018)

- Shim Soo-chang
- Hangul: 심수창
- Hanja: 沈秀昶
- RR: Sim Suchang
- MR: Sim Such'ang

Shim Soo-chang (born February 9, 1981, in Seoul, South Korea) is a South Korean relief pitcher for the Hanwha Eagles of the KBO League. He bats and throws right-handed.

== Amateur career ==
Shim attended Baemyung High School in Seoul, South Korea. In 1999, as the team's ace pitcher he led his team to runners-up in the President's Cup National Championship. During the competition, Shim drew attention from MLB scouts, and then negotiated a contract with a few Major League teams. However, he eventually failed in his attempt to secure the contract with any team.

Upon graduation from the school in 2000, he was selected by the LG Twins with the 11th pick in the 2nd round of the 2000 KBO Draft, but chose to play college baseball at Hanyang University instead of turning pro.

In August 2002, as a junior Shim was called up to the South Korea national baseball team and competed in the inaugural World University Baseball Championship held in Messina, Italy. Shim started for South Korea in the 5th place game against Italy. He earned the win in that game, racking up 5 strikeouts and giving up just an earned run in 4 innings pitched.

In November 2003, as a senior Shim was named as a member of the South Korean national team for the 2003 Asian Baseball Championship in Sapporo, Japan. He was the only amateur player in the Team Korea's roster but was omitted from the roster a week before the start of the competition due to injuries.

=== Notable international careers ===
Year	Venue	Competition	Team
2002	Italy	World University Baseball Championship	5th

== Professional career ==
After graduating from Hanyang University in 2004, Shim began his professional career in the LG Twins. He picked up his first professional league win on October 9, 2004, beating the Lotte Giants in relief at home. However, Shim finished his rookie season with a disappointing record of 2-1 and a 4.55 ERA, appearing in only 16 games as a setup man.

In 2005, Shim had another disappointing season with a record of 0-1 and an ERA of 4.22 in 32 innings pitched in relief, spending most of the year pitching for the Twins reserve team.

Shim had a very solid season in 2006, when he finished the season with a record of 10-9 and an ERA of 4.38 in 135.2 innings pitched, amassing 56 strikeouts as a starting pitcher. In July, Shim was elected to the 2006 KBO All-Star Game for the first time.

Following the double-digit win season, Shim was shifted back to the middle relief role to fill a void in the Twins' bullpen in the 2007 season. He posted a record of 3-5 and an ERA of 4.31 with a career-high 10 holds and 2 saves, appearing in a career-high 56 games as a utility pitcher.

In 2008, Shim spent most of the season in the reserve team, failing to earn his spot either in the starting rotation or in the bullpen due to the decrease of ball velocity and the absence of command. He finished with a 6–5 record as a starter, recovering from the slump later in the season, but had a 5.16 ERA, which was the highest ERA of his pro career.

While with the Twins, from June 26, 2009 to July 21, 2011, Shim lost 17 consecutive decisions as a starter and reliever. This losing streak is the longest in the Korean professional baseball history, breaking the record of 16 losing streak set by Kim Jong-Seok in 1987–91. On July 31, 2011, Shim was traded to the Nexen Heroes along with Park Byung-ho for Kim Seong-hyun and Song Shin-young. On August 3, Shim lost a record 18th straight game, allowing 3 earned runs in six innings pitched against the Samsung Lions. On August 9, Shim finally won to break a streak of 18 consecutive games lost, hurling 6.1 innings of one-run ball in a 3–1 victory over the Lotte Giants.

In 2012, however, Shim had one of his worst seasons, posting a 7.30 ERA as a long reliever and mop-up man. He claimed no wins but earned five losses, continuing another 9 losing streak including four consecutive losses in the 2011 season.

== Filmography ==
=== Television show ===
Year	Title	Role	Notes	Ref.
2022	Strongest Baseball	Cast Member		
2023	Golf Match Swing Star	Contestant		
