= Takesaki =

Takesaki (written: 竹崎) is a Japanese surname. Notable people with the surname include:

- Hironobu Takesaki (竹崎 博允, born 1944), Japanese lawyer
- Masamichi Takesaki (竹崎 正道, born 1933), Japanese mathematician

== See also ==
- Takasaki (surname)
