= Lin Yueh-ping =

Taiwanese baseball player and manager

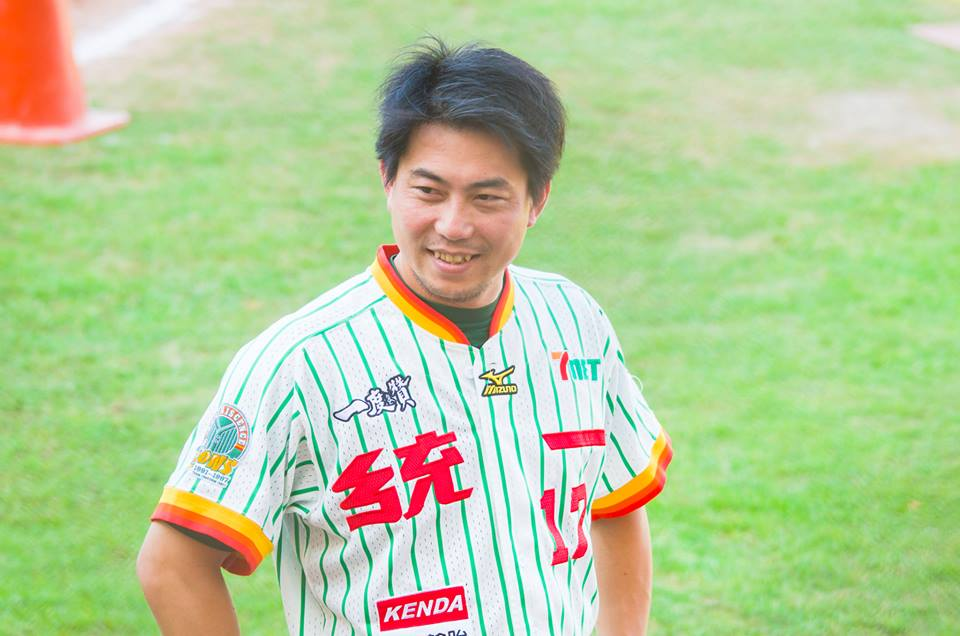

Uni-President Lions – No. 11
- Pitcher / Manager
- Born: 28 January 1982 (age 44); Kaohsiung, Taiwan
- Batted: Right Threw: Right

CPBL debut
- 13 March, 2005, for the Uni-President Lions

Last CPBL appearance
- 30 September, 2017, for the Uni-President Lions

Career statistics
- Record: 33-43
- Saves: 129
- Holds: 21
- ERA: 3.88
- Strikeouts: 517
- Stats at Baseball Reference

Teams
- Uni-President Lions (2005–2017)
Medals
Representing Chinese Taipei
Men’s Baseball
Intercontinental Cup
Silver medal – second place	2002 Havana	Team
Bronze medal – third place	2006 Taichung	Team
Asian Games
Silver medal – second place	2002 Busan	Team
Gold medal – first place	2006 Doha	Team
Asian Baseball Championship
Silver medal – second place	2003 Sapporo	Team

Lin Yueh-ping (Chinese: 林岳平; pinyin: Lín Yuèpíng; Wade–Giles: Lin^{2} Yüeh^{4} Ping^{2}; born 28 January 1982 in Kaohsiung, Taiwan) is a Taiwanese baseball manager and former pitcher for the Uni-President Lions of the Chinese Professional Baseball League (CPBL).

Lin is among the fastest Taiwanese pitchers of the CPBL. He consistently throws around 145 km/h (90 mph), and when needed can reach back for more and has been clocked as fast as 154 km/h (96 mph). He features a slider as his out pitch.

At the end of the 2006 season, he was diagnosed with aortic regurgitation and underwent surgical aortic valve replacement in May 2007. He made a full recovery and was able to continue his career with the Lions until retiring in the 2017 season.

== Family ==
He married footballer Chen Hui-shan in April 2009.

He has two children.

== Career statistics ==
=== Playing career ===
Season	Team	G	W	L	H	S	GF	CG	BB	K	ER	IP	ERA
2005	Uni-President Lions	36	7	3	3	0	2	0	54	111	58	135.0	3.87
2006	Uni-President Lions	46	5	6	0	1	1	0	51	82	36	100.2	3.22
2007	Uni-President Lions	5	0	0	0	0	0	0	4	3	2	2.1	7.71
2008	Uni-President 7-Eleven Lions	43	7	4	0	17	0	0	46	73	44	102.1	3.87
2009	Uni-President 7-Eleven Lions	63	4	5	1	26	0	0	24	40	22	66.2	2.96
2010	Uni-President 7-Eleven Lions	39	1	6	3	14	0	0	25	32	23	56.1	3.67
2011	Uni-President 7-Eleven Lions	50	0	4	4	28	0	0	27	53	19	58.2	2.91
2012	Uni-President 7-Eleven Lions	34	1	4	0	23	0	0	20	31	17	34.0	4.50
2013	Uni-President 7-Eleven Lions	44	2	4	2	20	0	0	27	26	12	40.2	2.66
2014	Uni-President 7-Eleven Lions	43	3	4	9	0	0	0	19	21	21	38.0	4.97
2015	Uni-President 7-Eleven Lions	18	0	1	0	0	0	0	11	12	12	18.2	5.79
2016	Uni-President 7-Eleven Lions	9	0	0	0	0	0	0	6	4	9	5.0	16.20
2017	Uni-President 7-Eleven Lions	38	3	2	4	0	0	0	15	29	23	33.2	6.15
TOTAL	13 YEARS	468	33	43	36	129	3	0	329	517	298	692.0	3.88

== See also ==
- Chinese Professional Baseball League
- Uni-President 7-Eleven Lions
