= Hisayoshi Chōno =

Japanese baseball player (born 1984)

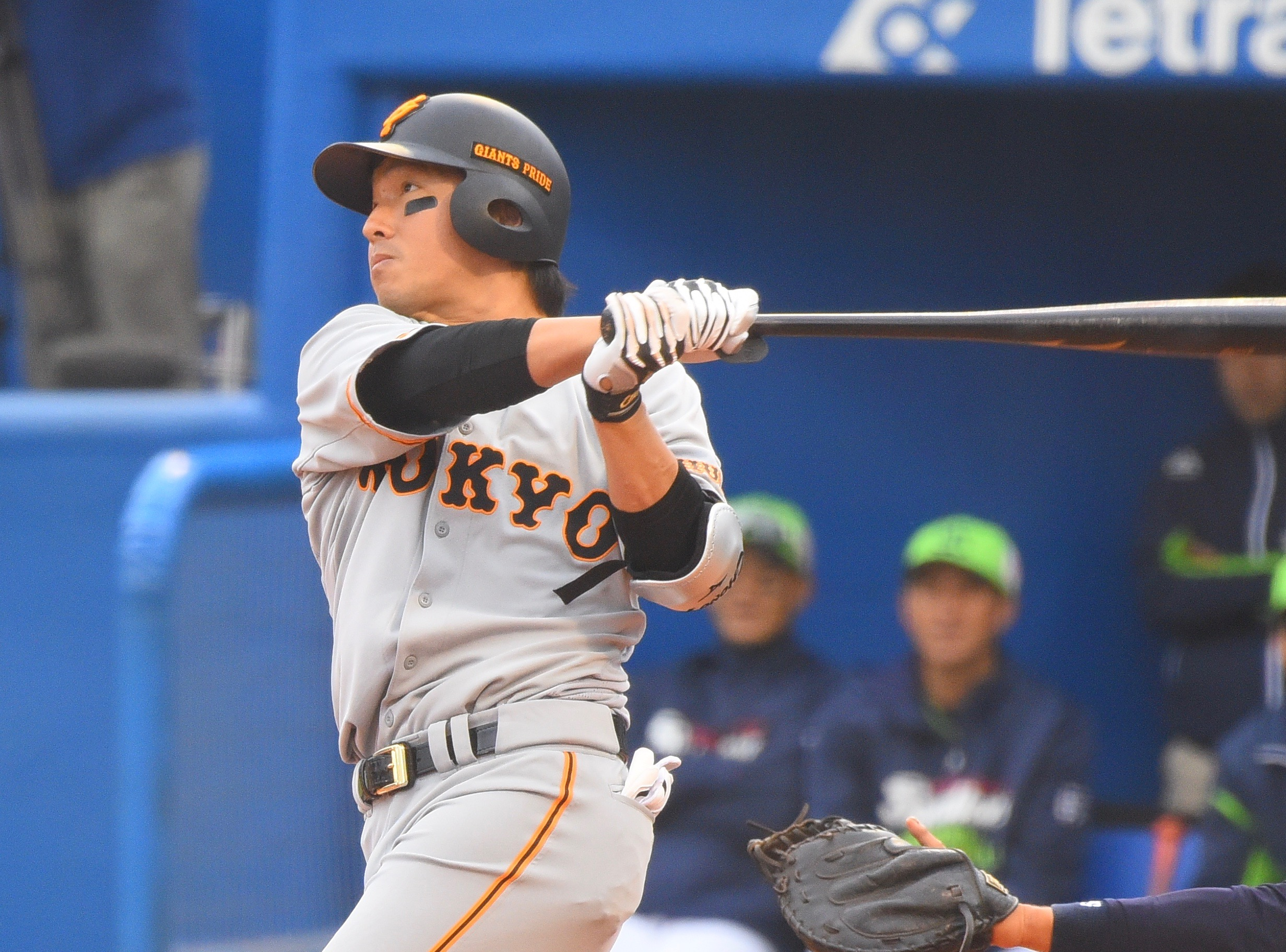
- Chōno with the Yomiuri Giants
- Outfielder
- Born: December 6, 1984 (age 41); Kiyama, Saga, Japan
- Batted: Right Threw: Right

NPB debut
- March 26, 2010, for the Yomiuri Giants

Last NPB appearance
- September 14, 2025, for the Yomiuri Giants

NPB statistics
- Batting average: .280
- Home runs: 163
- Runs batted in: 623
- Hits: 1,509
- Stats at Baseball Reference

Teams
- Yomiuri Giants (2010–2018); Hiroshima Toyo Carp (2019–2022); Yomiuri Giants (2023–2025)

Career highlights and awards
- 2× NPB All-Star (2011–2012); 2× Best Nine Award (2011–2012); 2× Mitsui Golden Glove Award (2011–2012); Central League batting champion (2011); 2010 Central League Rookie of the Year

Hisayoshi Chōno (長野 久義, Chōno Hisayoshi ; born December 6, 1984) is a Japanese former professional baseball outfielder. He played in Nippon Professional Baseball (NPB) for the Yomiuri Giants and Hiroshima Toyo Carp from 2010 to 2025.

== Career ==
Chōno was named the 2010 Central League Rookie of the Year.

In 2009 NPB draft, Yomiuri Giants selected him with the first selection. On November 23, he agreed to terms with the team on a one-year contract.

On December 20, 2018, Chōno was sent to Hiroshima Toyo Carp during a trade for Yoshihiro Maru.

On October 14, 2025, Chōno announced that he would be retiring from professional baseball.

== International career ==
He represented Japan national baseball team at the 2006 Asian Games in Doha and 2013 World Baseball Classic. And also, on November 16, 2018, he was selected Yomiuri Giants roster at the 2018 MLB Japan All-Star Series exhibition game against MLB All-Stars.
