= Chiang Chien-ming =

Taiwanese baseball player

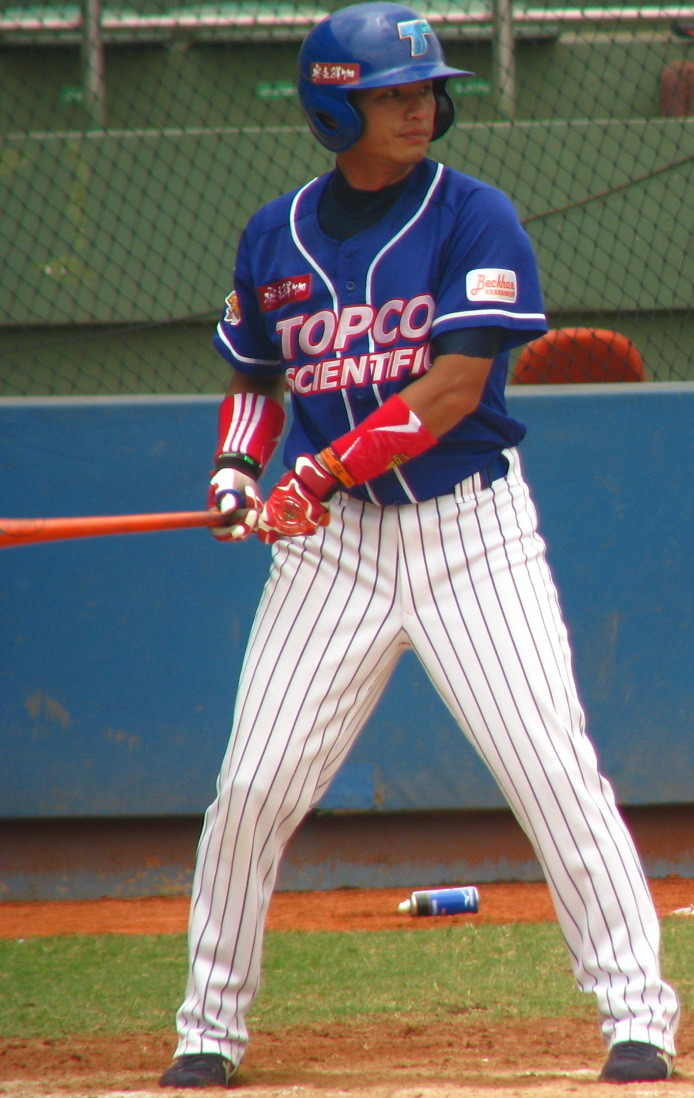
- Pitcher
- Born: May 27, 1985 (age 40)
- Batted: Right Threw: Right

Professional debut
- NPB: June 14, 2006, for the Yomiuri Giants
- NPB: April 2, 2009, for the Sinon Bulls

Last appearance
- NPB: August 11, 2007, for the Yomiuri Giants
- NPB: August 15, 2010, for the Sinon Bulls

NPB statistics
- Win–loss record: 5–6
- Earned run average: 3.20
- Strikeouts: 61

CPBL statistics
- Win–loss record: 0–0
- Earned run average: 4.66
- Strikeouts: 13
- Stats at Baseball Reference

Teams
- Yomiuri Giants (2006–2007); Sinon Bulls (2009–2010)
Medals
Representing Chinese Taipei
Men's baseball
Asian Games
Gold medal – first place	2006 Doha	Team
Asian Baseball Championship
Silver medal – second place	2005 Miyazaki	Team

Chiang Chien-ming (Chinese: 姜建銘; pinyin: Jiáng Jiànmíng; Wade–Giles: Chiang^{1} Chien^{4} Ming^{2}; born May 27, 1985, in Taiwan) is a Taiwanese former professional baseball starting pitcher who played for the Yomiuri Giants of Nippon Professional Baseball. He was initially signed in 2005, becoming the fifth Taiwanese player to ever play for the Yomiuri Giants. His NPB debut was on June 14, 2006, first start was on August 22, on which day he got his first win.

== Early life and education ==
Born in Taipei County, Taiwan, Chiang played baseball at Qiang Shu High School in Taipei.

== Playing career ==
In 2005, Chiang joined the Yomiuri Giants in Japan at age 20.

== Post-playing career ==
In February 2023, Chiang retired from his playing career and became an assistant hitting coach. He attended a 2023 coaching seminar held by the Yomiuri Giants.

== International career ==
Chiang played for the Taiwanese national team in the 2006 World Baseball Classic and the 2006 Asian Games, winning a gold medal at the Asian Games.
