= Jang Sung-ho =

Jang Sung-ho may refer to:

- Jang Sung-ho (baseball) (born 1977), South Korean first baseman/outfielder
- Jang Sung-ho (judoka) (born 1978), South Korean judoka
