= Cho Dong-chan =

South Korean baseball player

Cho Dong-chan 조동찬 趙東贊
- Second baseman
- Born: July 27, 1983 (age 42); Gongju, South Chungcheong
- Batted: Right Threw: Right

KBO debut
- September 10, 2002, for the Samsung Lions

Last appearance
- June 16, 2018, for the Samsung Lions

KBO statistics
- Batting average: .258
- Home runs: 92
- Runs batted in: 426
- Stats at Baseball Reference

Teams
- Samsung Lions (2002–2014, 2016–2018)

Cho Dong-chan (born July 27, 1983) is a South Korean former professional baseball player, who played 16 seasons with the Samsung Lions of the Korea Baseball Organization. His elder brother Cho Dong-hwa is also a professional baseball player for the SK Wyverns. He represented the South Korea national baseball team at the 2006 and 2010 Asian Games.
