= Woo Kyu-min =

South Korean baseball player (born 1985)

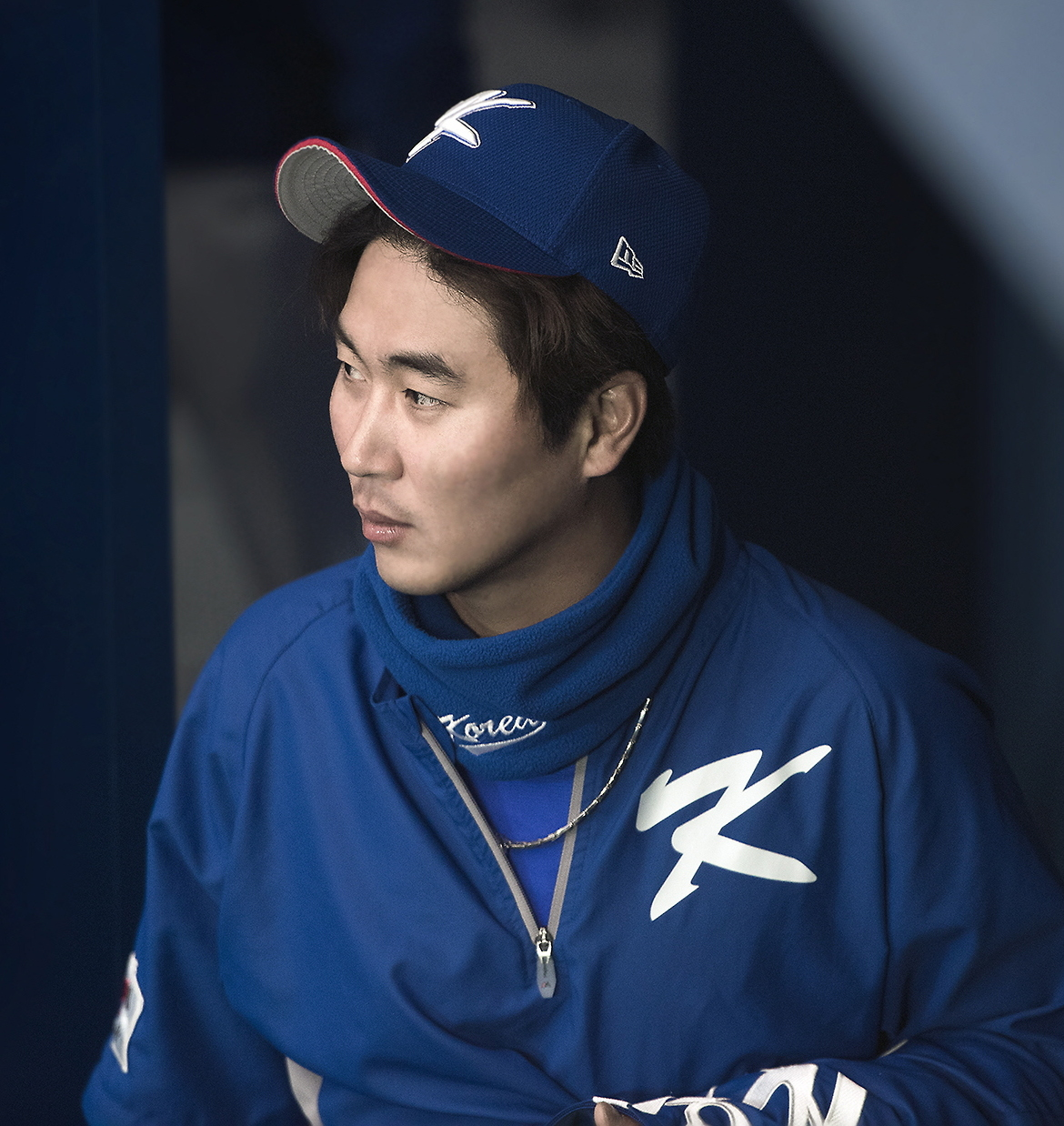

KT Wiz – No. 21
- Pitcher
- Born: January 21, 1985 (age 41); Daegu
- Bats: Right Throws: Right

KBO debut
- March 13, 2004, for the LG Twins

KBO statistics (through May 29, 2024)
- Win–loss record: 82–87
- Earned run average: 3.95
- Strikeouts: 876
- Saves: 90
- Stats at Baseball Reference

Teams
- LG Twins (2004–2009, 2012–2016); Samsung Lions (2017–2023); KT Wiz (2024–present)
Medals
Men's baseball
Representing South Korea
Asian Games
Bronze medal – third place	2006 Doha	Team
2015 WBSC Premier12
Gold medal – first place	2015 Tokyo	Team

- Woo Kyu-min
- Hangul: 우규민
- Hanja: 禹奎珉
- RR: U Gyumin
- MR: U Kyumin

Woo Kyu-min (Korean: 우규민; born January 21, 1985) is a South Korean professional baseball pitcher for the KT Wiz of the KBO League.

After the 2016 season, he became a free agent and transferred on December 5, 2016, under the terms of a total of 6.5 billion won, including four years of contract period, 3.7 billion won of down payment, and 700 million won of annual salary.
