= Krissada Heebthong =

Thai baseball player

- Pitcher
- Born: April 17, 1986 (age 39); Chiang Mai, Thailand
- Bats: Right Throws: Right

Teams
- Honda Suzuka (–2010)

Krissada Heebthong (白倉キッサダー, Shirakura Kissada; born April 17, 1986 in Bangkok, Thailand) is a Thai baseball pitcher. Heepthong is listed as 5'9" tall (175 cm) and 159 pounds (72 kg). He pitched for Thailand national baseball team in the 2006 Asian games, which was held in Doha, Qatar, as well as the 2007 Baseball World Cup. His fastball can reach approximately 142~144 km/h(about 88.2~89.5MPH) with good command.

== Early life and career ==
Heebthong was born in Chiang Mai, Thailand to a Japanese father and Thai mother. He moved to Japan as a child and began playing baseball in elementary school. He later became a standout pitcher at Ueda Nishi High School and at Asia University, earning recognition in collegiate competition before joining Honda Suzuka.

== Royal decoration ==
- 2008 – Silver Medalist (Seventh Class) of The Most Admirable Order of the Direkgunabhorn
