= Chen Yung-chi =

Taiwanese baseball player (born 1983)

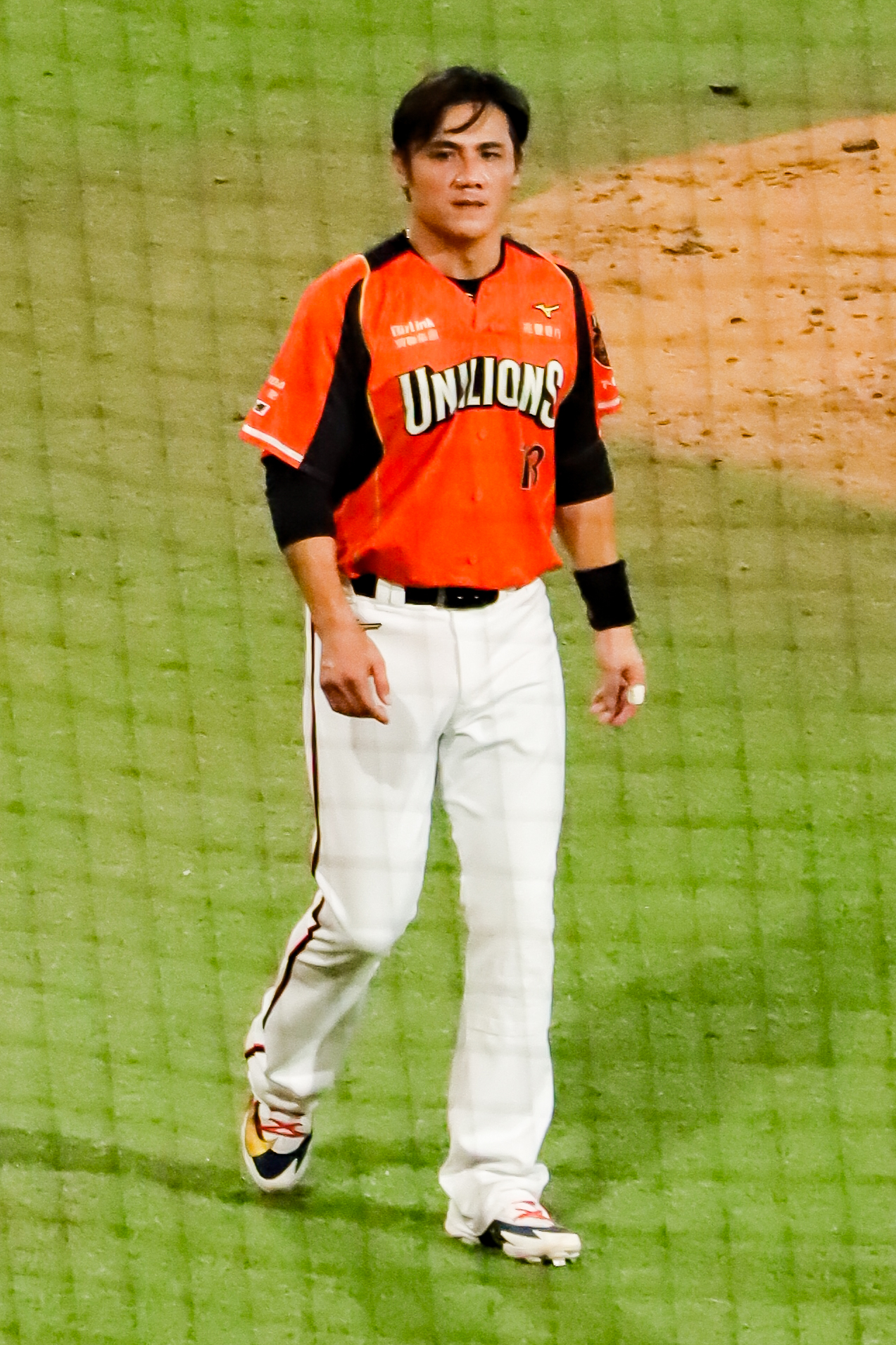
- Chen in 2026

Uni-President Lions – No. 13
- Infielder
- Born: July 13, 1983 (age 43); Taitung County, Taiwan
- Bats: Right Throws: Right

CPBL debut
- March 20, 2011, for the Uni-President Lions

CPBL statistics (through 2025 season)
- Batting average: .304
- Hits: 1,324
- Home runs: 136
- Runs batted in: 735
- Stolen bases: 119
- Stats at Baseball Reference

Teams
- Uni-President Lions (2011–present)

Career highlights and awards
- 3× Taiwan Series champion (2011, 2013, 2020)
Medals
Representing Chinese Taipei
Men's baseball
Intercontinental Cup
Silver medal – second place	2002 Havana	Team
Bronze medal – third place	2006 Taichung	Team
Asian Games
Gold medal – first place	2006 Doha	Team
Silver medal – second place	2010 Guangzhou	Team
Asian Baseball Championship
Silver medal – second place	2003 Sapporo	Team
Silver medal – second place	2009 Sapporo	Team

Chen Yung-chi (Chinese: 陳鏞基; pinyin: Chén Yōngjī; Wade–Giles: Chen² Yung¹ Chi¹; known in Amis language as Mayaw Ciru; born July 13, 1983) is a Taiwanese professional baseball infielder for the Uni-President Lions of the Chinese Professional Baseball League (CPBL).

== Professional career ==
=== Seattle Mariners ===
Chen signed with the Seattle Mariners organization as an international free agent on January 15, 2004. In April 2007, while playing for the Triple-A Tacoma Rainiers, Chen underwent surgery on his left shoulder and missed the rest of the season. On November 21, 2007, the Mariners selected Chen's contract to the 40-man roster. On April 13, 2008, Chen was hit in the head by Josh Towers and suffered a mild concussion.

=== Oakland Athletics ===
On November 12, 2008, Chen was claimed off waivers by the Oakland Athletics. On March 6, 2009, Chen was outrighted off of the 40-man roster. He was assigned to the Double-A Midland RockHounds to begin the season and was later promoted to the Sacramento River Cats. Chen began 2010 in Midland but was released on June 2, 2010. On June 24, Chen signed a minor league contract with the Pittsburgh Pirates organization and was assigned to the Double-A Altoona Curve. On November 6, Chen elected free agency.

=== Uni-President Lions ===
On November 23, 2010, after entering the Chinese Professional Baseball League draft and being drafted by the Uni-President Lions, Chen signed with the team. in January 2026, Chen announced that he would retire at season’s end.

== International career ==
In 2006, he competed in the World Baseball Classic for Chinese Taipei, ranked 3rd in most doubles hit, and hit the first grand slam of WBC (Taiwan vs. China). He played in the All-Star Futures Game during the All-Star break in 2006, with another Taiwanese player Chin-Lung Hu. After the season ended, he competed in the 2006 Intercontinental Cup and Baseball games of 2006 Asian Games. He won the best second baseman award of 2006 Intercontinental Cup, and gold medal of Asian Games.
