= Takasaki (surname) =

Takasaki (written: 高崎 or 高嵜) is a Japanese surname. Notable people with the surname include:

- Akira Takasaki (高崎 晃, born 1961), Japanese musician and songwriter
- Chikaaki Takasaki (高崎 親章, 1853–1920), Japanese politician
- Hiroyuki Takasaki (高崎 寛之, born 1986), Japanese footballer
- Kentaro Takasaki (高崎 健太郎, born 1985), Japanese baseball player
- Riki Takasaki (高嵜 理貴, born 1970), Japanese footballer
- Ryusui Takasaki (born 1976), Japanese sumo wrestler and coach
- Tatsunosuke Takasaki (高碕 達之助, 1885–1964), Japanese businessman and politician
