= Cho In-sung =

South Korean baseball player (born 1975)

Doosan Bears – No. 75
- Catcher / Battery coach
- Born: May 25, 1975 (age 51)
- Batted: Right Threw: Right

KBO debut
- April 15, 1998, for the LG Twins

Last KBO appearance
- May 23, 2017, for the Hanwha Eagles

KBO statistics
- Batting average: .252
- Home runs: 186
- Runs batted in: 801
- Stats at Baseball Reference

Teams
- LG Twins (1998–2011); SK Wyverns (2012–2014); Hanwha Eagles (2014–2017)

- Cho In-sung
- Hangul: 조인성
- Hanja: 趙寅成
- RR: Jo Inseong
- MR: Cho Insŏng

Cho In-sung
Medal record

Men's baseball

Representing South Korea

World Baseball Classic
Bronze medal – third place	2006 San Diego	Team

Cho In-sung (Korean: 조인성; Hanja: 趙寅成; born May 25, 1975) is a South Korean retired catcher. He batted and threw right-handed.

== Amateur career ==
In November 1993, as a junior at Shinil High School in Seoul, South Korea, Cho was selected as a member of the South Korea junior national baseball team and competed in the annual friendly baseball series against the Japan junior national baseball team in Okinawa, Japan.

In 1994, Cho started his collegiate career playing for Yonsei University. Regarded as the nation's top catching prospect in college baseball, he regularly participated in international events during his four years at the college.

In 1996, Cho was called up to the South Korea national baseball team for the 1996 Summer Olympics in Atlanta, United States. At the Olympics, he hit two home runs, including a two-run home run off of Masanori Sugiura, with a .263 batting average and 5 RBIs.

=== Notable international careers ===
Year	Venue	Competition	Team	Individual note
1995	Japan	Universiade	Silver medal	.333 BA (1-for-3)
1995	Japan	Asian Baseball Championship	Silver medal	
1995	Cuba	Intercontinental Cup	4th	.000 BA (0-for-8), 1 RBI
1996	United States	Olympic Games	8th	.263 BA (5-for-19), 2 HR, 5 RBI, 3 R
1997	Chinese Taipei	Asian Baseball Championship	Gold medal	

== Professional career ==
Cho was selected by the LG Twins in the first round of the 1998 KBO Draft. In his rookie season, he played 84 games as a backup catcher for the Twins, hitting .269 with 36 hits in 134 at-bats. After the season, Cho was named to the South Korea national baseball team that won the gold medal at the Asian Games held in Bangkok, Thailand in December 1998. Cho received a military exemption for winning the gold medal, alongside the fellow gold medalists Park Chan-ho, Seo Jae-weong and Kim Byung-hyun.

After the 1999 season, All-Star veteran catcher Kim Dong-soo became a free agent and signed with the Samsung Lions for the 2000 season. Upon Kim Dong-soo's departure through free agency to the Samsung Lions, Cho earned the full-time position behind the plate for the Twins in the 2000 season.

In 2000, his first season as the full-time catcher for the Twins, Cho struggled at the plate, batting .225 with 5 home runs but exhibited strong defensive skills, leading the league in caught-stealing percentage, as he threw out 24 of 50 runners.

In 2003, Cho hit a career-high 19 home runs with a 257 batting average and 58 RBIs, playing in a career-high 132 games as the club's full-time catcher.

Prior to the 2006 season, Cho played for the South Korea at the inaugural World Baseball Classic in March 2006. He led his team to the bronze medal, going 2-for-9 at the plate and splitting the position behind the plate with Hong Sung-heon and Jin Kab-yong.

In 2007, Cho had his most offensively productive season when he posted career-highs in batting (.282), hits (118), RBI (73), runs (44) and doubles (24) in 124 games.

During a televised pennant game in August 2009, Cho and one of his teammate pitcher Shim Soo-chang arguing on the mound was caught on camera. The next day, Cho and Shim were both sent to the LG Twins minor league system.

=== Notable international careers ===
Year	Venue	Competition	Team	Individual note
1998	Thailand	Asian Games	Gold medal	.353 BA (6-for-17), 6 RBI, 2 R
2003	Japan	Asian Baseball Championship	Bronze medal	.000 BA (0-for-3)
2006	United States	World Baseball Classic	Bronze medal	.222 BA (2-for-9)
2006	Qatar	Asian Games	Bronze medal	.286 BA (2-for-7)
2007	Chinese Taipei	Asian Baseball Championship	Silver medal	.400 BA (4-for-10), 1 RBI, 1 R
2008	Chinese Taipei	Final Olympic Qualification Tournament	Silver medal	.222 BA (2-for-9), 1 RBI, 2 R
