= Satoshi Komatsu =

Japanese baseball player and coach

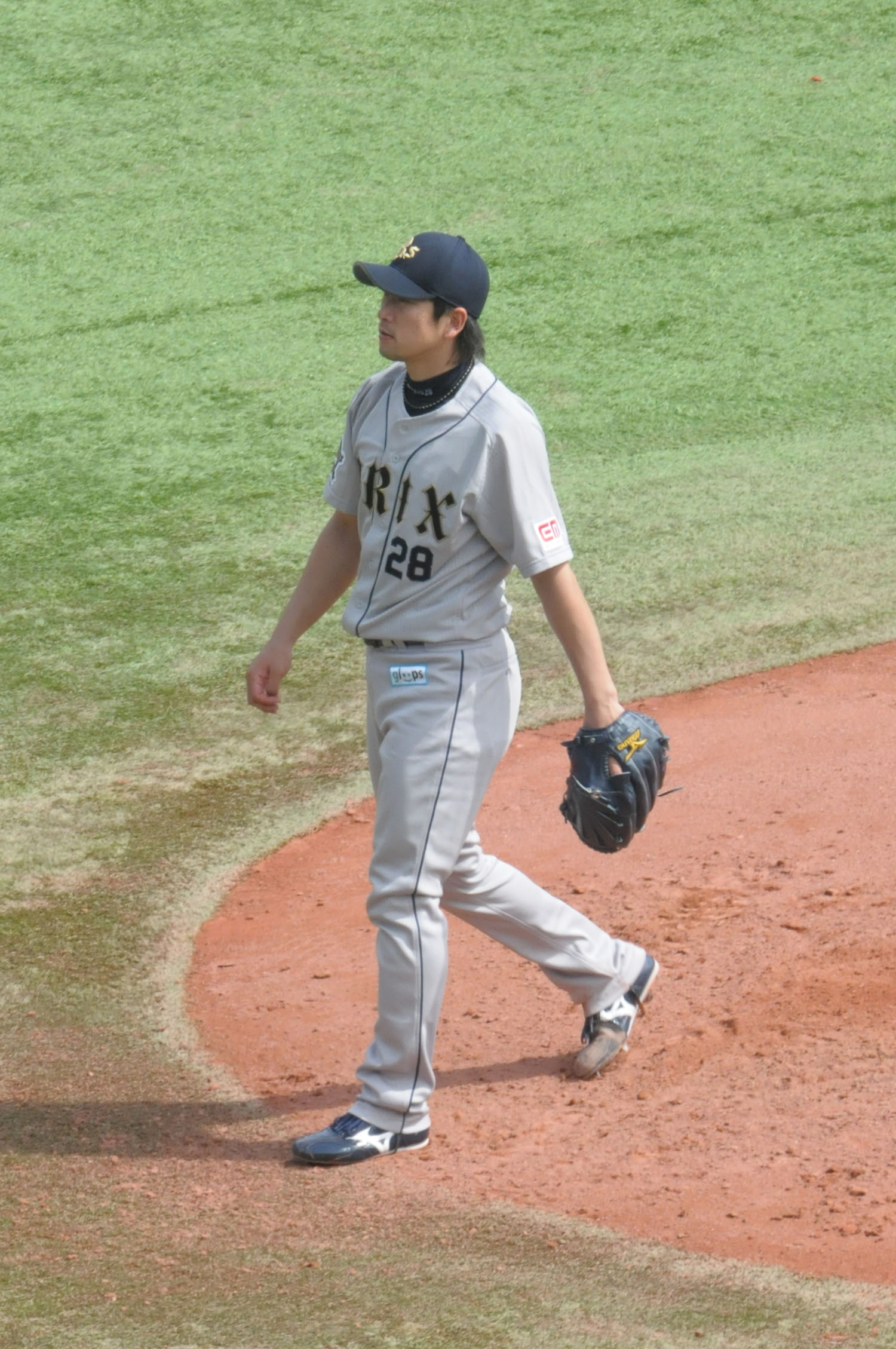
- Komatsu with the Orix Buffaloes
- Pitcher / Coach
- Born: October 29, 1981 (age 43); Iwaki, Fukushima, Japan
- Batted: Right Threw: Right

NPB debut
- July 16, 2007, for the Orix Buffaloes

Last appearance
- September 29, 2016, for the Orix Buffaloes

NPB statistics (through 2016)
- Win–loss record: 25-26
- ERA: 4.38
- Strikeouts: 388

Teams
- As player: Orix Buffaloes (2007–2016); As coach: Orix Buffaloes (2017–2020)

Career highlights and awards
- 2008 Pacific League Rookie of the Year
Medals
Representing Japan
Men's baseball
World Baseball Classic
Gold medal – first place	2009 Los Angeles	Team
Asian Games
Silver medal – second place	2006 Doha	Team

Satoshi Komatsu (小松 聖, Komatsu Satoshi; born October 29, 1981 in Iwaki, Fukushima) is a retired Japanese pitcher who played his entire career in Nippon Professional Baseball for the Orix Buffaloes in Japan's Pacific League.

== Career ==
He was drafted in the 2006 NPB Draft by the Orix Buffaloes after pitching for Japan in the 2006 Asian Games.

In 2007, Komatsu was 1-0 with a 2.53 ERA in eight relief appearances, striking out 13 in 10 2/3 IP. He had a huge year in 2008, going 15-3 for a team that was otherwise under .500; he had a 2.51 ERA and allowed 134 hits in 172 1/3 IP. He finished third in the Pacific League in ERA and wins, behind Hisashi Iwakuma and Yu Darvish in both categories. His 151 strikeouts placed him 5th and was named Rookie of the Year that season, being a unanimous pick.
