= Chen Hui-shan =

Chinese football player from Taiwan

Personal information
- Full name: Chen Hui-shan (陳惠珊)
- Date of birth: 18 March 1985 (age 41)
- Place of birth: Republic of China (Taiwan)
- Position: Goalkeeper

International career
| Years | Team | Apps | (Gls) |
- Chinese Taipei

Chen Hui-shan (Chinese: 陳惠珊; pinyin: Chén Huìshān; born 18 March 1985) is a Taiwanese female football goalkeeper. She has represented Chinese Taipei in the 2010 East Asian Football Championship.

== Personal life ==
Chen's husband is former professional baseball player Lin Yueh-ping. They married in April 2009.
