= Park Jae-hong (baseball) =

South Korean baseball player (born 1973)

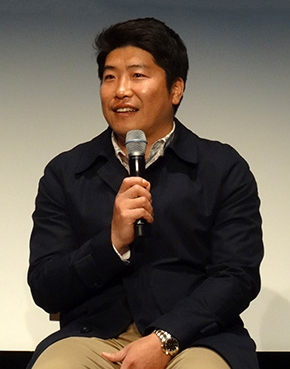
- Outfielder
- Born: September 7, 1973 (age 52); Gwangju, South Korea
- Batted: Right Threw: Right

KBO debut
- April 2, 1996, for the Hyundai Unicorns

Last appearance
- October 6, 2012, for the SK Wyverns

KBO statistics
- Batting average: .284
- Home runs: 300
- Runs batted in: 1,081
- Stolen bases: 267
- Stats at Baseball Reference

Teams
- Hyundai Unicorns (1996–2002); Kia Tigers (2003–2004); SK Wyverns (2005–2012)

Career highlights and awards
- 4× KBO Golden Glove Award winner (1996, 1997, 1998, 2000); 4× Korean Series winner (1998, 2000, 2007, 2008); KBO Rookie of the Year (1996); KBO All-Star Game MVP (2002)
Medals
Representing South Korea
Men's baseball
Olympic Games
Bronze medal – third place	2000 Sydney	Team
Korean name
Hangul	박재홍
Hanja	朴栽弘
RR	Bak Jaehong
MR	Pak Chaehong

Park Jae-hong (Korean: 박재홍; born September 7, 1973, in Gwangju, South Korea) is a retired South Korean outfielder in the KBO League. Park was considered one of the best five-tool players in the KBO. He was the first player in KBO history to have 30 home runs and 30 stolen bases (in 1996) and the only player to have more than two seasons of 30 home runs and 30 stolen bases, doing so a record three times: (1996, 1998 and 2000). He was a 30-30 player in his debut season (1996), the only person to do so until Mike Trout, who did it in 2012.

Park competed in the 2000 Summer Olympics, and led his team to the bronze medal in the baseball tournament.

== Amateur career ==
While attending Gwangju Jeil High School, Park was a highly regarded right-handed power pitcher. In 1991, he was selected for the South Korean national junior baseball team as a pitcher to compete against the Japan and USA national junior teams at the 3-nation friendly baseball series in California, United States. The Korean team swept all the games with a record of 4-0 and Park drew attention from MLB scouts along with fellow pitchers Park Chan-ho and Lim Sun-dong.

In 1992, upon graduation from high school, Park started to play college baseball at Yonsei University, converting his position to third base. While at Yonsei University, Park led his team to five college championships in four years alongside Lim Sun-dong and Cho In-sung.

In 1993, as a sophomore Park was selected for the South Korea national baseball team and competed in the Asian Baseball Championship held in Perth, Australia. The South Korean team won silver and Park was named to the All-Star Team as a third baseman.

As a senior in 1995, Park helped Yonsei University win the 1995 National College Championship (Spring Season) and was named MVP with Home Run, RBI and Stolen Bases titles. After the 1995 college season, he signed with the Hyundai Phoenix in the Korea Baseball Association amateur league, refusing to join the KBO pro league in order to participate in the 1996 Summer Olympics the following year.

=== Notable international careers ===
Year	Venue	Competition	Team	Individual note
1993	Australia	Asian Baseball Championship	Silver medal	All-Star (3B)
1993	United States	Universiade	Silver medal	
1994	Japan	Asian Games	Silver medal	
1994	Nicaragua	Baseball World Cup	Silver medal	.293 BA (12-for-41), 11 R
1995	Japan	Universiade	Silver medal	.125 BA (2-for-16), 2 SB
1995	Japan	Asian Baseball Championship	Silver medal	

== Professional career ==
=== Hyundai Unicorns ===
After the 1995 KBO season, the Pacific Dolphins based in Incheon was purchased by Hyundai Group due to financial difficulties, and the team was moved before the 1996 season to Suwon and renamed the Hyundai Unicorns. Due to the business relationship between the Phoenix and the Unicorns, five players in the Hyundai Phoenix roster moved to the Hyundai Unicorns and Park eventually decided to join the pro league, signing with the Unicorns in March 1996. In the 1996 KBO season, as a rookie Park become the first player in KBO history to join the 30–30 club. He also won the home run and RBI titles and Golden Glove Awards as an outfielder. After the season, Park was named Rookie of the Year in unanimous vote and runner-up behind Koo Dae-sung of the Hanwha Eagles in the MVP balloting.

Park joined his second 30–30 club in 1998 when he hit 30 home runs and stole a career-high 43 bases. After the season, Park was selected for the South Korea national baseball team and led his team to their first Asian Games gold medal in the baseball tournament, batting .455 with 3 home runs and 12 RBI.

Park joined his third 30–30 club in the 2000 KBO season when he hit 32 home runs and stole 30 bases. Park also won his second RBI title, driving in 115 runs. In September 2000, he competed for South Korea in the 2000 Summer Olympics where they won the bronze medal in the baseball tournament.

=== Kia Tigers ===
Prior to the 2003 season, Park was traded to the Kia Tigers for third baseman Jeong Seong-hoon. In 2003, he had his third .300 plus batting average (.301) season, accumulating 19 home runs, 66 RBI and 14 stolen bases.

In 2004, Park hit his 200th career home run on May 11 to become the tenth player in 22-year KBO history to reach the milestone. However, he had his worst pro season due to injuries, batting a career-low .253 and hitting only 7 home runs and 47 hits in 73 games played.

=== SK Wyverns ===
After the 2004 season, Park was traded to the SK Wyverns where he played center field and batted cleanup or 5th in the order.

On July 23, 2005, Park joined the 200-200 club as its first member in KBO history, getting his 200th stolen base of his career.

In the 2007 season, Park had 17 home runs, and led the Wyverns to their first Korean Series championship.

On April 23, 2009, Park stole his 250th base of his career, and this made him the first member of KBO's 250-250 club.

After the 2011 season, Wyverns offered him the coaching job but he wanted to stay as a player. On November 25, 2011, Wyverns confirmed that he would play for the team one more year.

On October 3, 2012, Park became the seventh player ever to hit 300 home runs. He also became the oldest player to slug 300 home runs when he accomplished the feat at the age of 39 years and 26 days.

On January 23, 2013 Park announced his retirement as a pro baseball player. After his retirement he acted as a baseball TV commentator.

=== Notable international careers ===
Year	Venue	Competition	Team	Individual note
1998	Thailand	Asian Games	Gold medal	.455 BA (10-for-22), 3 HR, 12 RBI, 9 R
1999	South Korea	Asian Baseball Championship	Gold medal	.438 BA (7-for-16), 7 RBI, 3 R All-Star (OF), RBI title
2000	Australia	Olympic Games	Bronze medal	.182 BA (4-for-22), 1 HR, 5 RBI, 5 R
2002	South Korea	Asian Games	Gold medal	.364 BA (8-for-22), 3 RBI, 4 R
2003	Japan	Asian Baseball Championship	Bronze medal	.455 BA (5-for-11), 3 RBI
2006	Qatar	Asian Games	Bronze medal	.000 BA (0-for-7)

== See also ==
- List of KBO career home run leaders
- List of KBO career stolen bases leaders
