= Chen Feng-min =

Taiwanese baseball player (born 1977)

- Catcher
- Born: 29 October 1977 (age 48)
- Batted: Right Threw: Right

CPBL debut
- 2003, for the First Financial Holdings Agan

Last CPBL appearance
- 2009, for the La New Bears

Career statistics
- Batting average: .245
- Home runs: 19
- Runs batted in: 196
- Stats at Baseball Reference

Teams
- First Financial Holdings Agan / La New Bears (2003–2009)

Chen Feng-Min (born 29 October 1977) is a Taiwanese baseball player who competed in the 2008 Summer Olympics.
