= Yasutaka Hattori =

Japanese baseball player

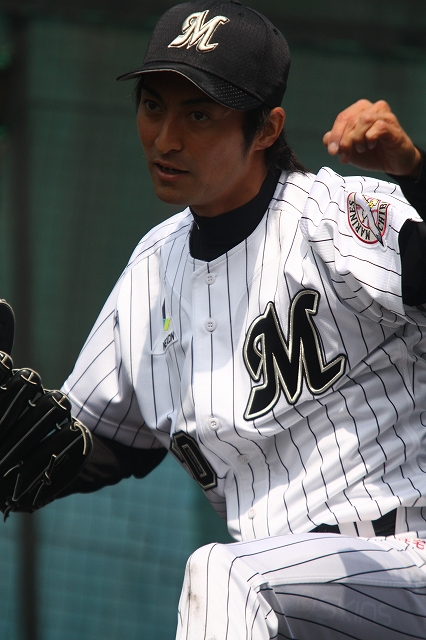
- Hattori with the Chiba Lotte Marines
- Pitcher
- Born: September 10, 1982 (age 43)
- Bats: Left Throws: Left

NPB debut
- 2010, for the Chiba Lotte Marines

NPB statistics (through 2014)
- Win–loss record: 2–1
- ERA: 5.81
- Strikeouts: 30
- Stats at Baseball Reference

Teams
- Chiba Lotte Marines (2010–2011, 2013–2014)

Yasutaka Hattori (服部 泰卓, born September 10, 1982, in Mima, Tokushima) is a former Japanese professional baseball pitcher. He played with the Chiba Lotte Marines from 2010 to 2011 and from 2013 to 2014.
