= Kei Nomoto =

Japanese baseball player (born 1984)

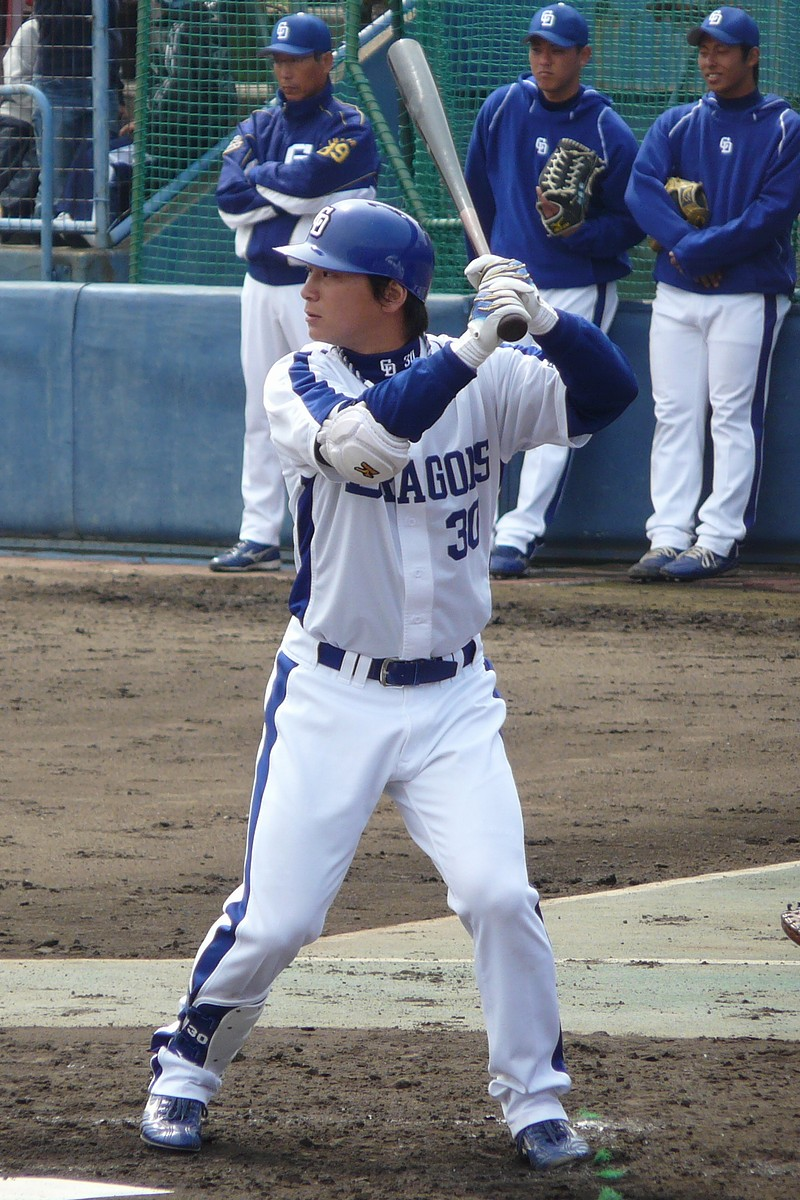

Chunichi Dragons
- Outfielder/Scout
- Born: July 7, 1984 (age 41)
- Batted: Left Threw: Left

NPB debut
- 3 April, 2009, for the Chunichi Dragons

Last NPB appearance
- 9 October, 2018, for the Chunichi Dragons

NPB statistics (through 2018)
- Batting average: .224
- Home runs: 9
- RBI: 83

Teams
- Chunichi Dragons (2009–2018)

Kei Nomoto (野本 圭, Nomoto Kei; born July 7, 1984) is a retired Japanese professional baseball outfielder who played for the Chunichi Dragons in Japan's Nippon Professional Baseball. He is now part of scouting department with the Dragons.
