= Song Shin-young =

South Korean baseball player

- Pitcher
- Born: March 1, 1977 (age 49); Seoul
- Bats: Right Throws: Right

KBO debut
- April 19, 2001, for the Hyundai Unicorns

KBO statistics (through 2016)
- Win–loss record: 60–51
- Earned run average: 4.25
- Strikeouts: 811
- Holds: 77
- Saves: 47
- Stats at Baseball Reference

Teams
- Hyundai Unicorns (2001–2007); Nexen Heroes (2008–2011); LG Twins (2011); Hanwha Eagles (2012); NC Dinos (2013); Nexen Heroes (2013–2015); Hanwha Eagles (2016–2017)

- Song Shin-young
- Hangul: 송신영
- Hanja: 宋臣永
- RR: Song Sinyeong
- MR: Song Sinyŏng

Song Shin-young (born March 1, 1977) is a South Korean professional baseball pitcher for the Hanwha Eagles of the KBO League.
