= Lin Wei-chu =

Taiwanese baseball player (born 1979)

Lin Wei-Chu
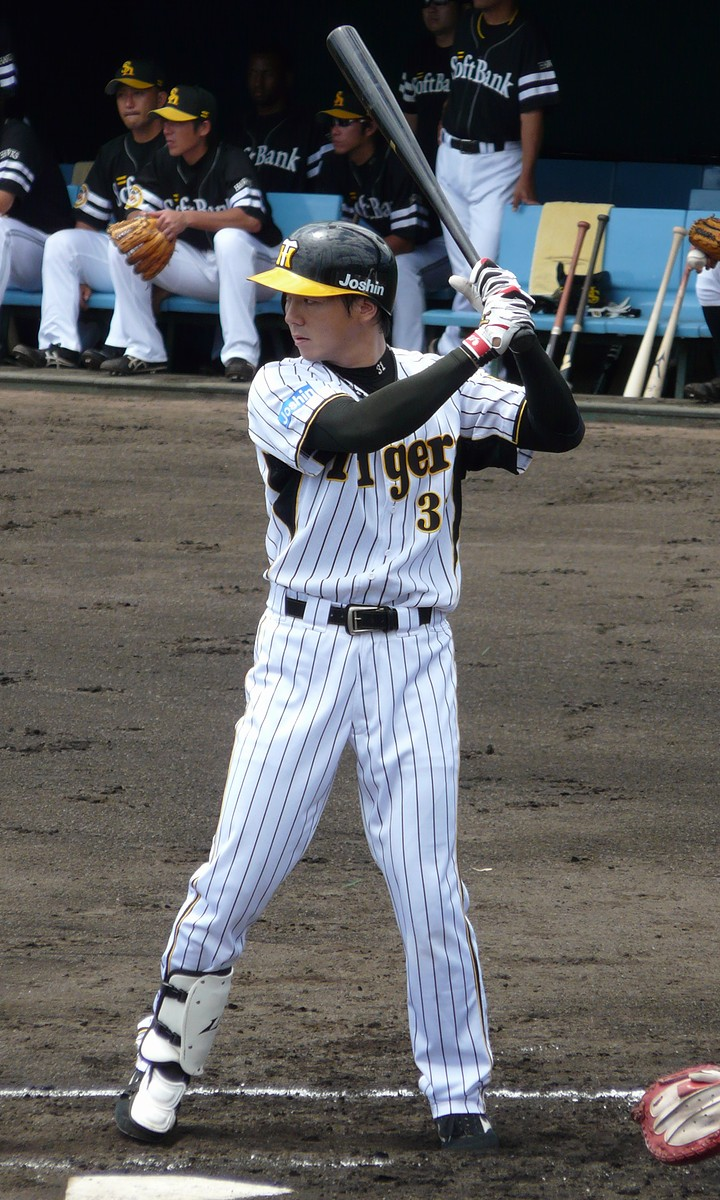
- Outfielder, Designated hitter
- Born: January 22, 1979 (age 47); Taiwan
- Batted: Left Threw: Left

Professional debut
- NPB: 10 October, 2004, for the Hanshin Tigers
- CPBL: 23 March, 2014, for the Chinatrust Brothers

Last appearance
- NPB: 2013, for the Hanshin Tigers
- CPBL: 29 June, 2017, for the Chinatrust Brothers

NPB statistics
- Batting average: .264
- Home runs: 31
- Runs batted in: 125
- Managerial record: 144–111–10
- Winning %: .565

CPBL statistics
- Batting average: .288
- Home runs: 12
- Runs batted in: 109
- Stats at Baseball Reference

Teams
- As player: Hanshin Tigers (2003–2013); Chinatrust Brothers (2014–2017); As manager: CTBC Brothers (2021–2023)

Career highlights and awards
- 2x Taiwan Series champion (2021, 2022)

Lin Wei-Chu (born 22 January 1979) is a Taiwanese former professional baseball outfielder. He played in Nippon Professional Baseball (NPB) for the Hanshin Tigers and in the Chinese Professional Baseball League (CPBL) for the Chinatrust Brothers. He competed in the 2004 Summer Olympics. He also spent time as the manager of the CTBC Brothers, winning two Taiwan Series.

== Career ==
Lin played for the Hanshin Tigers of Nippon Professional Baseball (NPB) from 2004 to 2013.

He then played for the Chinatrust Brothers of the Chinese Professional Baseball League (CPBL) from 2014 to 2017. On September 27, 2017, Lin announced his retirement from professional baseball.

On 10 May 2023, Lin stepped down as manager of the CTBC Brothers and was assigned to the role of "overseas development consultant". In 2 years and 5 months as manager, Lin had 144 wins, 111 losses, and 10 draws, as well as two Taiwan Series championships. On 20 October 2024, Lin was hired by the Fubon Guardians to serve as the team's farm director and assistant general manager.
