= Zhang Hongbo =

Chinese baseball player

Zhang Hongbo (simplified Chinese: 张洪波; traditional Chinese: 張洪波; pinyin: Zhāng Hóngbō; born 6 June 1980 in Panzhihua, Sichuan, China) is a Chinese baseball player who is a member of Team China at the 2008 Summer Olympics.

== Sports career ==
- 1989 Sichuan Panzhihua Sports School (Baseball);
- 1997 Guangdong Provincial Team;
- 1998 National Youth Team;
- 1999 National Team

== Major performances ==
- 1997/2001 National Games - 3rd/2nd;
- 2006/2007 National League - 2nd;
- 2006 Asian Games - 4th
