= Chen Junyi =

Chinese baseball player (born 1981)

- Pitcher
- Born: August 26, 1981 (age 44); Guangzhou, China
- Bats: Left Throws: Left

Chen Junyi (simplified Chinese: 陈俊毅; traditional Chinese: 陳俊毅; pinyin: Chén Jùnyì; Cantonese: Chan4 Jeun3 Ngai6; born 26 August 1981 in Tianjin, China) is a Chinese baseball player who was a member of Team China at the 2008 Summer Olympics. He is nicknamed "The Little Unit" due to his slender body and mullet that resembles Randy Johnson.

== Sports career ==
- 1998 Guangdong Provincial Team;
- 2006 National Team

== Major performances ==
- 2005 National Games - 5th;
- 2006/2007 National League - 2nd;
- 2006 National Championship - 4th
