= Wang Wei (baseball) =

Chinese baseball player (born 1978)

Beijing Tigers
- Catcher
- Born: December 25, 1978 (age 47); Beijing, China
- Bats: Right Throws: Right
- Stats at Baseball Reference

Wang Wei (simplified Chinese: 王伟; traditional Chinese: 王偉; pinyin: Wáng Wěi; born 25 December 1978 in Beijing, China) is a professional baseball catcher from the People's Republic of China. He holds the distinction of having hit the first home run ever in the World Baseball Classic, when China played eventual champion Japan in the first round. On June 20, 2007, he signed a minor league contract with the Seattle Mariners of Major League Baseball (MLB).

While playing for China in the 2008 Summer Olympics, Wang injured his knee in a collision with USA player Matt LaPorta. He had to have surgery on it.
