= Keng Po-hsuan =

Taiwanese baseball player

Po-Hsuan Keng
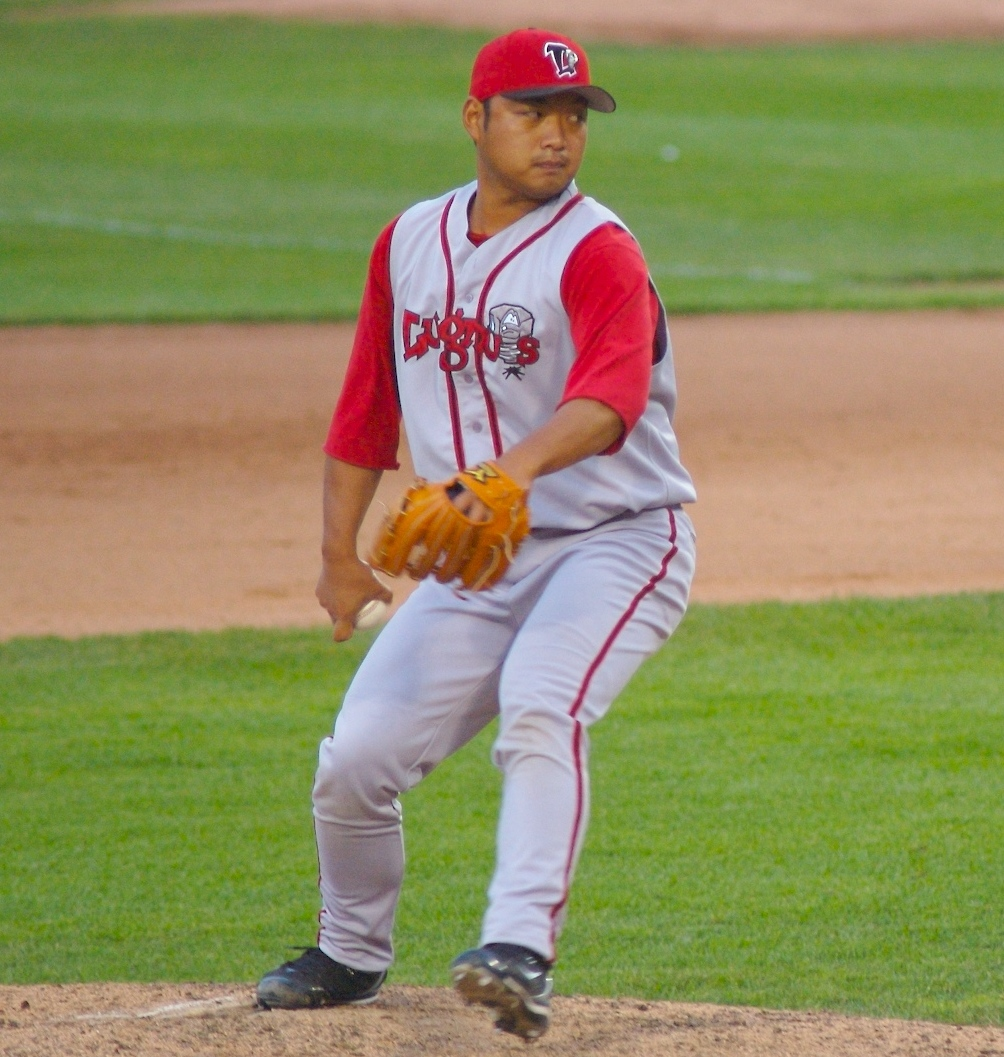
- Keng with the Lansing Lugnuts in 2007
- Pitcher
- Born: October 15, 1984 (age 41); Taipei, Taiwan
- Bats: Right Throws: Right

CPBL debut
- April 2, 2009, for the Lamigo Monkeys

CPBL statistics
- Win–loss record: 12–12
- Earned run average: 4.27
- Strikeouts: 87
- Stats at Baseball Reference

Teams
- Lamigo Monkeys (2009–2012); Chinatrust Brothers (2013–2015)

Keng Po-Hsuan (Chinese: 耿伯軒; pinyin: Gěng Bóxuān; born 15 October 1984) is a Taiwanese baseball player who competed for the Chinese Taipei national baseball team in the 2004 Summer Olympics and the 2006 and 2009 World Baseball Classic.
