= C. C. Lee =

Taiwanese baseball player (born 1986)

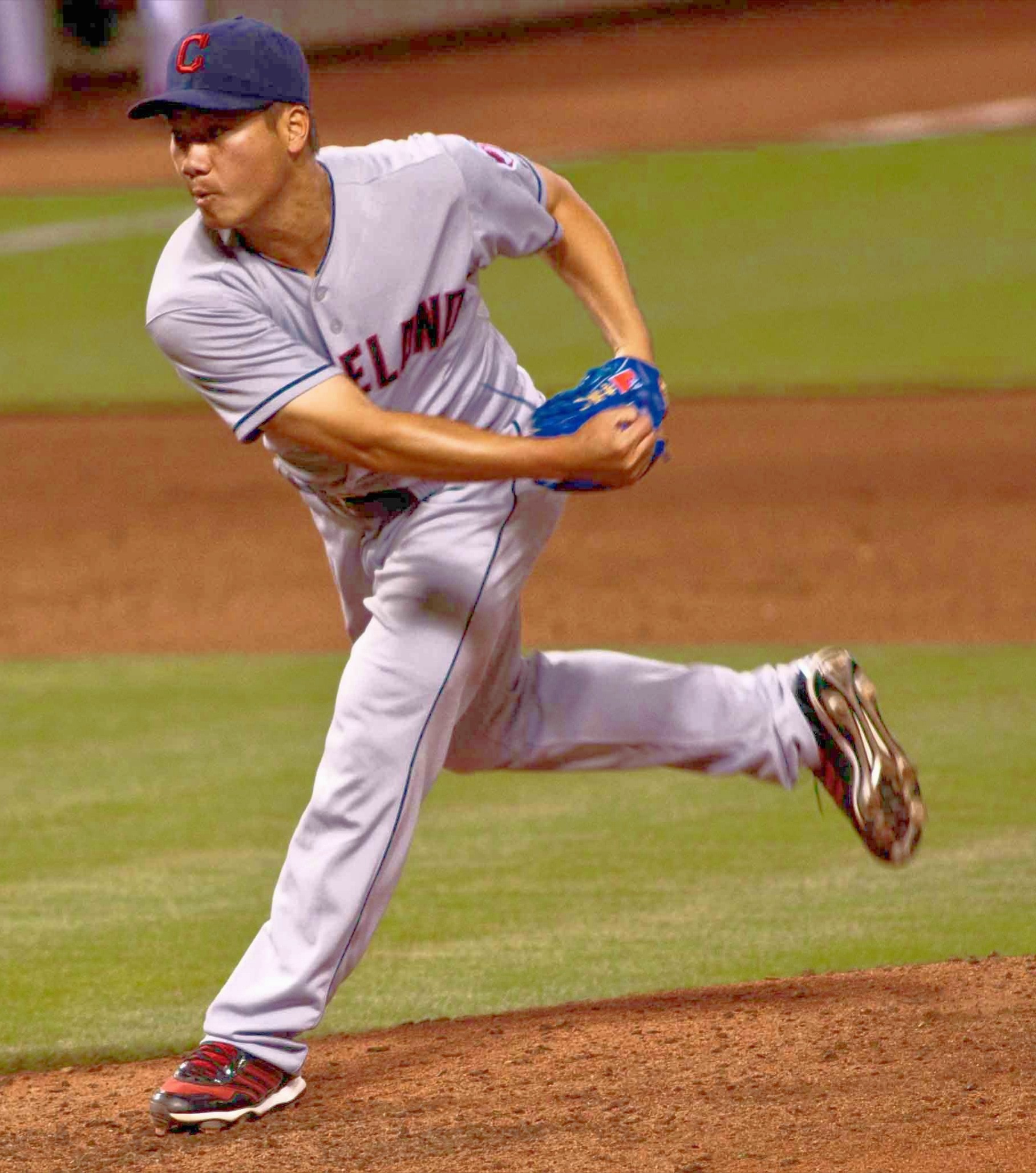
- Lee pitching for the Cleveland Indians in 2014

CTBC Brothers – No. 21
- Pitcher
- Born: October 21, 1986 (age 39); Penghu, Taiwan
- Bats: Right Throws: Right

Professional debut
- MLB: July 14, 2013, for the Cleveland Indians
- NPB: March 26, 2016, for the Saitama Seibu Lions
- CPBL: July 25, 2018, for the Chinatrust Brothers

MLB statistics (through 2015 season)
- Win–loss record: 1–1
- Earned run average: 4.50
- Strikeouts: 33

NPB statistics (through 2016 season)
- Win–loss record: 0–0
- Earned run average: 6.48
- Strikeouts: 13

CPBL statistics (through 2025 season)
- Win–loss record: 18–12
- Earned run average: 3.01
- Strikeouts: 333
- Saves: 82
- Stats at Baseball Reference

Teams
- Cleveland Indians (2013–2015); Saitama Seibu Lions (2016); Chinatrust Brothers / CTBC Brothers (2018–present)

Career highlights and awards
- CPBL: 3x Taiwan Series champion (2021, 2022, 2024)
Medals
Men's baseball
Representing Chinese Taipei
Intercontinental Cup
Bronze medal – third place	2006 Taichung	Team competition
Asian Games
Gold medal – first place	2006 Doha	Team competition

C. C. Lee
- Traditional Chinese: 李振昌
- Simplified Chinese: 李振昌
Transcriptions
Standard Mandarin
- Hanyu Pinyin: Lǐ Zhènchāng
- Bopomofo: ㄌㄧˇ ㄓㄣˋㄔㄤ
- Wade–Giles: Li³ Chen⁴-Ch'ang¹
Southern Min
- Hokkien POJ: Lí Chìn-chhiong

Lee Chen-ch'ang (Chinese: 李振昌; pinyin: Lǐ Zhènchāng; Wade–Giles: Li³ Chen⁴-Ch'ang¹; born October 21, 1986) is a Taiwanese professional baseball pitcher for the CTBC Brothers of the Chinese Professional Baseball League (CPBL). He has previously played in Major League Baseball (MLB) for the Cleveland Indians and in Nippon Professional Baseball (NPB) for the Saitama Seibu Lions.

== Career ==
=== Cleveland Indians ===
Lee began playing baseball while a student at National Pingtung Senior High School. He competed for the Chinese Taipei national baseball team in the 2008 Summer Olympics, and had a 2.00 earned run average (ERA) and 11 strikeouts in two appearances. After appearing in the Olympics, the Cleveland Indians signed him as a free agent.

After joining the Indians organization, Lee competed in the 2009 World Baseball Classic. He began his stateside professional career with the Kinston Indians in 2009, finishing the year with a 4–6 win–loss record and a 3.35 ERA in 45 appearances. He spent 2010 with the Akron Aeros, and had a 4–5 record and a 3.22 ERA in 44 games. The following year, Lee split the season between the Aeros and Columbus Clippers. With the Clippers, he had a 4–0 record and a 2.21 ERA in 25 appearances.

After five games with the Clippers in 2012 and 19 in 2013, Lee was called up by the Cleveland Indians from their Triple-A affiliate Columbus Clippers on July 12, 2013, and became the 10th Taiwanese player to play in the MLB. In his debut on July 14, Lee pitched 1.1 innings in relief of Ubaldo Jiménez, allowing no hits and 1 walk. He was optioned back to Columbus on July 23 and finished the season there, ending it with a 2.37 ERA. Lee started the 2014 season in Columbus, but was brought up to the majors and had several stints with the Indians during the 2014 season.

=== Saitama Seibu Lions ===
On November 20, 2015, the Indians sold Lee's contract to the Saitama Seibu Lions of Nippon Professional Baseball.

On November 8, 2016, he became a free agent.

=== Colorado Rockies ===
On December 23, 2016, Lee signed a minor league contract with the Colorado Rockies that included an invitation to 2017 spring training. In 27 appearances for the Triple-A Albuquerque Isotopes, Lee registered a 5.54 ERA with 53 strikeouts in 37 1/3 innings pitched. He elected free agency following the season on November 6.

=== Los Angeles Dodgers ===
On January 1, 2018, Lee signed a minor league contract with the Los Angeles Dodgers organization. In 22 appearances for the Triple-A Oklahoma City Dodgers, Lee had a 3.91 ERA with 41 strikeouts in 25 1/3 innings pitched. On June 1, Lee exercised an opt-out clause in his contract in order to return to his home country of Taiwan and declare himself eligible for the 2018 Chinese Professional Baseball League (CPBL) draft.

=== Chinatrust / CTBC Brothers ===
Lee was selected first overall in the 2018 CPBL draft by the CTBC Brothers, and on July 10, 2018, signed to a 3.5 year deal with an annual salary of $248,000 USD plus $34,000 USD per season in incentives.

On May 3, 2023, Lee suffered a broken collarbone after being involved in a traffic collision, and later underwent successful surgery. He only made 11 appearances on the year, and struggled to a 6.75 ERA over 8 innings. Lee made 42 appearances out of the bullpen for the Brothers in 2024, compiling a 3–1 record and 4.70 ERA with 27 strikeouts across 38 1/3 innings pitched. With the Brothers, Lee won the 2024 Taiwan Series.

== International career ==
Lee was selected for Chinese Taipei national baseball team at the 2006 Intercontinental Cup, 2006 Asian Games, 2008 Summer Olympics, and 2009 World Baseball Classic.

== See also ==
- List of Major League Baseball players from Taiwan
