= Guo Youhua =

Chinese baseball player

Guo Youhua (born September 29, 1983, in Gansu) is a Chinese baseball player who was a member of Team China at the 2008 Summer Olympics.

== Sports career ==
- 1997-2000 Lanzhou Sports School;
- 2000-2005 Gansu Provincial Sports Team B;
- 2004 National Team;
- 2005–Present Army Team

== Major performances ==
- 2005 National League - 1st;
- 2006 Asian Games - 4th
