= Tseng Sung-wei =

Taiwanese baseball player

Sung-Wei Tseng
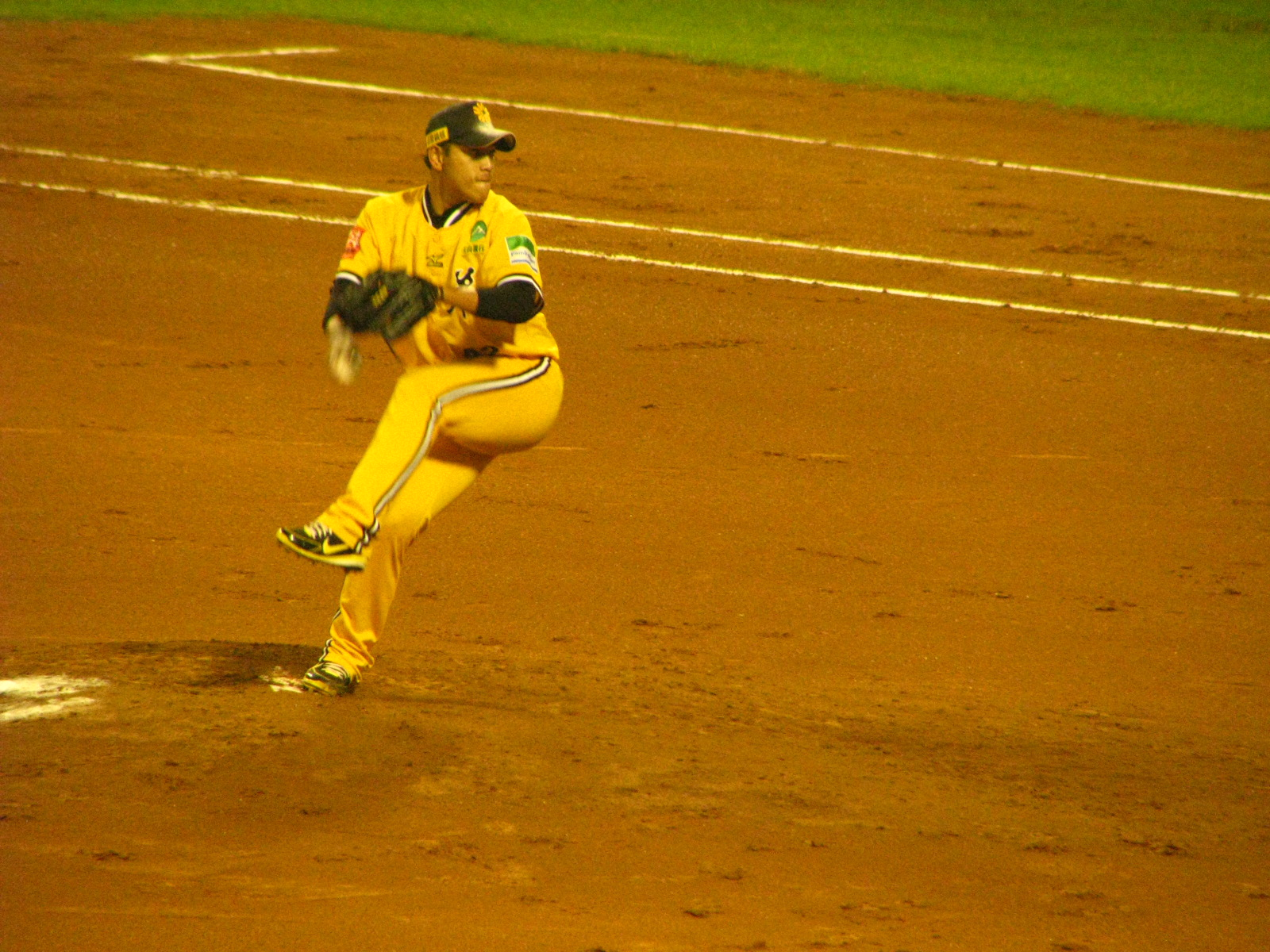
- Pitcher
- Born: December 28, 1984 (age 41); Taitung County, Taiwan
- Batted: Right Threw: Right

CPBL debut
- 2011, for the Brother Elephants

Last CPBL appearance
- 2017, for the Fubon Guardians

CPBL statistics
- Win–loss record: 15–21
- Earned run average: 4.32
- Strikeouts: 131
- Stats at Baseball Reference

Teams
- Brother Elephants/Chinatrust Brother Elephants (2011–2014); Fubon Guardians (2017)
Medals
Men's baseball
Representing Chinese Taipei
World Junior Baseball Championship
Silver medal – second place	2002 Sherbrooke	Team

Sung-Wei Tseng (Chinese: 增菘瑋; born December 28, 1984) is a Taiwanese former professional baseball player.

A pitcher, he played minor league baseball in the United States for the Cleveland Indians organization. In 2008, he played for the Akron Aeros and Kinston Indians.

Tseng also played for the Chinese Taipei baseball team in the 2009 World Baseball Classic.
