= Kentaro Takasaki =

Japanese baseball player

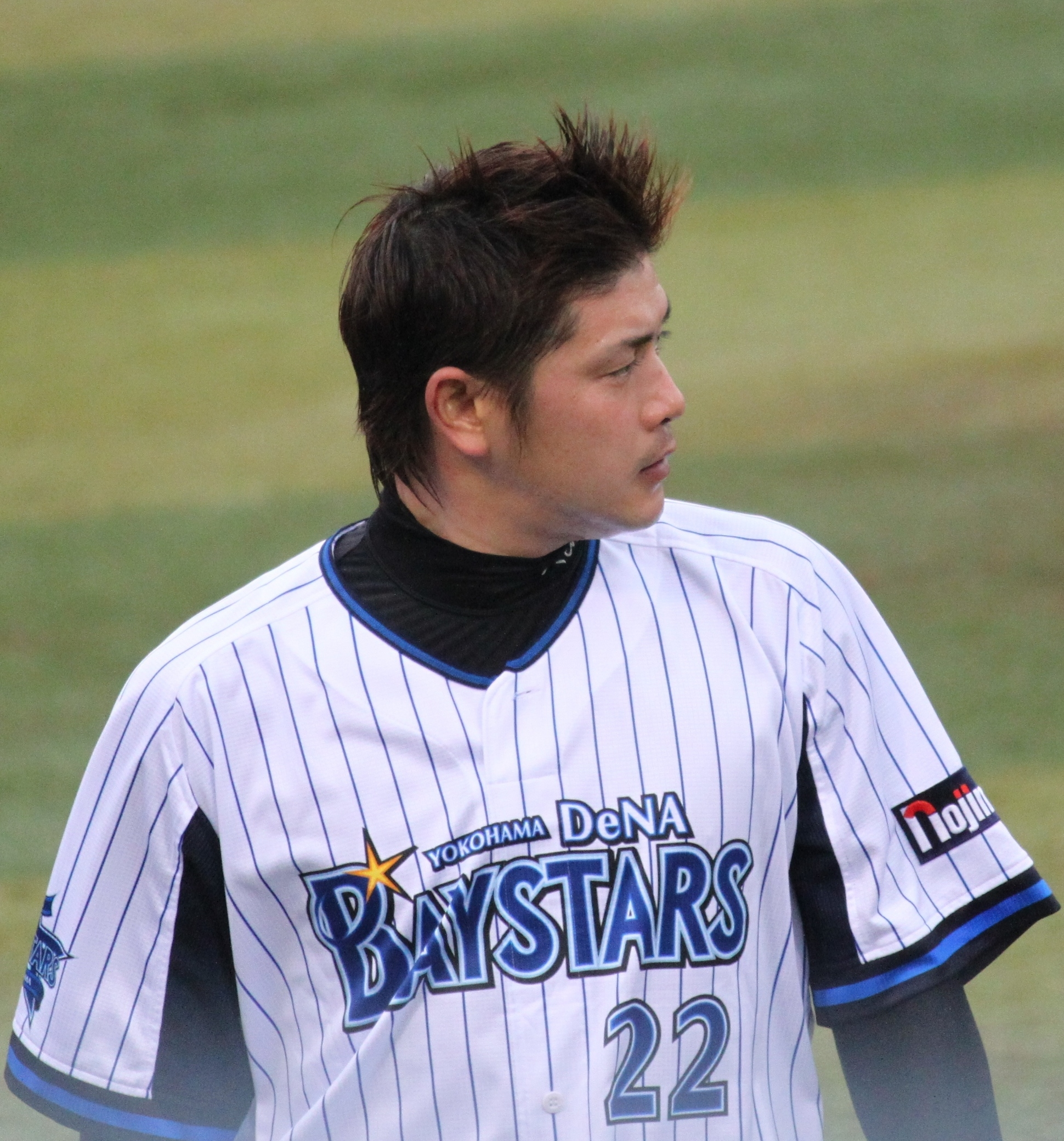
- Takasaki with the Yokohama DeNA BayStars
- Pitcher
- Born: June 24, 1985 (age 40); Kamimashiki District, Kumamoto, Japan
- Bats: Right Throws: Right

debut
- April 25, 2007, for the Yokohama BayStars
- Stats at Baseball Reference

Teams
- Yokohama BayStars Yokohama DeNA BayStars (2007–2017)

Kentaro Takasaki (高崎 健太郎, Takasaki Kentarō; born July 24, 1985) is a professional Japanese baseball player. He plays pitcher for the Yokohama DeNA BayStars.
