= Park Jin-man =

South Korean baseball player (born 1976)

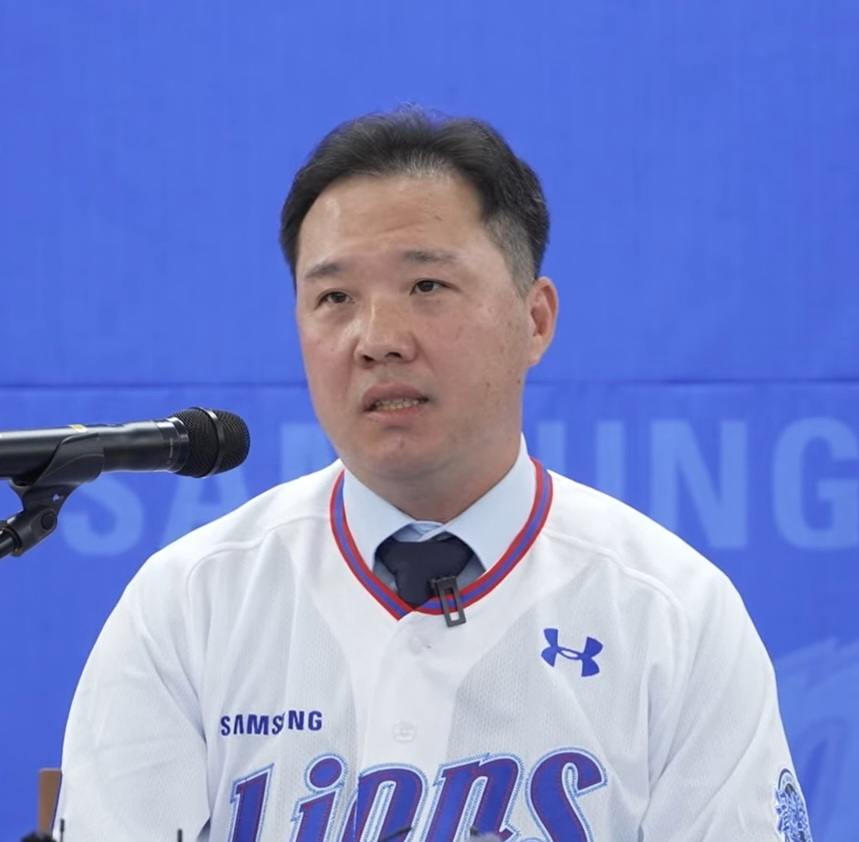

Samsung Lions – No. 70
- Shortstop / Manager
- Born: November 30, 1976 (age 49); Incheon, South Korea
- Bats: Right Throws: Right

KBO debut
- 1996, for the Hyundai Unicorns

KBO statistics
- Batting average: .261
- Home runs: 153
- RBI: 781
- Stats at Baseball Reference

Teams
- As player: Hyundai Unicorns (1996–2004); Samsung Lions (2005–2010); SK Wyverns (2011–2015); As coach: SK Wyverns (2016); Samsung Lions (2017–2021); As manager: Samsung Lions 2nd Team (2022); Samsung Lions Acting Manager (2022); Samsung Lions (2023–present)

Career highlights and awards
- As player: 6× Korean Series champion (1998, 2000, 2003-2006); 5× KBO Golden Glove Award (2000-2001, 2004, 2006-2007); KBO Korean Series MVP (2006); As manager: 40 Legend All-Stars (2022); Korean Series champion (2026); Korean Series manager of the year (2026)
Medals
Representing South Korea
Olympic Games
Gold medal – first place	2008 Beijing	Team
Bronze medal – third place	2000 Sydney	Team
Asian Games
Gold medal – first place	2002 Busan	Team

- Park Jin-man
- Hangul: 박진만
- Hanja: 朴鎮萬
- RR: Bak Jinman
- MR: Pak Chinman

Park Jin-man (born November 30, 1976) is a retired South Korean baseball shortstop. He batted and threw right-handed. He won the KBO League Golden Glove Award five times, and was also the 2006 Korean Series MVP.

He competed for the South Korea national baseball team at the 2000 Summer Olympics, where they won the bronze medal. He was also a member of the team that won the gold medal at the 2008 Olympic Games.

== Managerial career ==
He hired as the new manager of Samsung Lions in 2022.

He renewed his contract as manager with Samsung on November 3, 2025 for up to 2.3 billion won.
