= Sun Wei (baseball) =

Chinese baseball player

Hou Fenglian
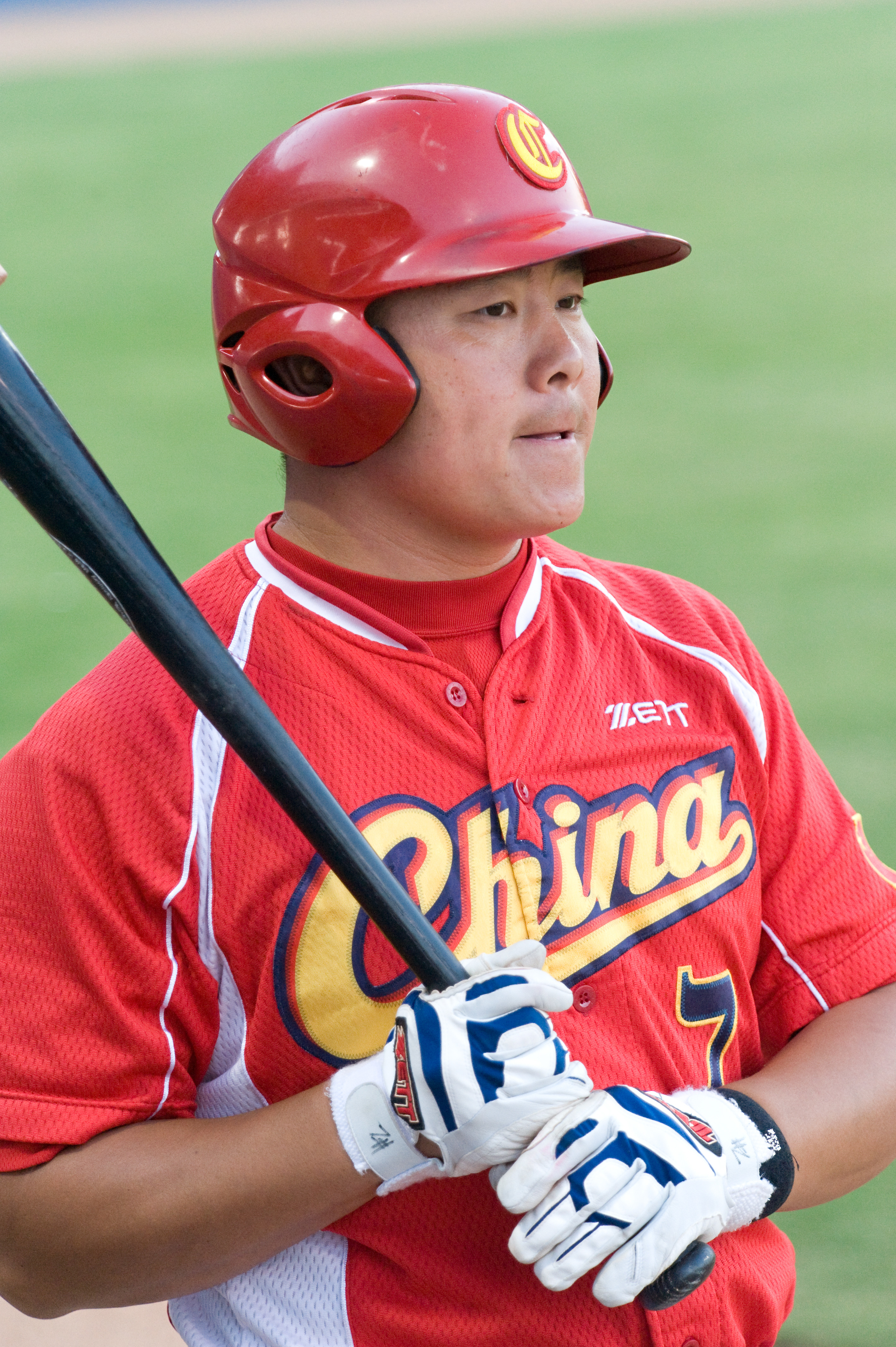
- Sun with the China national baseball team in 2008
- Third baseman
- Born: 11 September 1976 (age 48); Beijing, China
- Bats: Right Throws: Right

Sun Wei (born 11 September 1976) is a Chinese baseball player who was a member of Team China at the 2008 Summer Olympics.

== Sports career ==
- 1994 Beijing Municipal Team;
- 1995 National Team

== Major performances ==
- 1997 National Games - 1st;
- 2003-2005 National League - 1st
