= 2003 Asian Baseball Championship =

Tournament details
- Country: Japan
- Dates: 31 October – 7 November 2003
- Teams: 7

Final positions
- Champions: Japan (12th title)
- Runners-up: Chinese Taipei
- Third place: South Korea
- Fourth place: China

Tournament statistics
- Games played: 12

The 2003 Asian Baseball Championship was the 22nd edition of the Asian Baseball Championship. The tournament was contested in the Sapporo Dome in Sapporo, Japan from 31 October to 7 November 2003. The tournament was sanctioned by the Asian Baseball Federation. The top two teams of the tournament, Japan and Chinese Taipei, gained automatic entry into the 2004 Olympic Games in Athens.

== Participating teams ==
Entry in preliminary round

- China
- Indonesia
- Pakistan
- Philippines

Entry in final round

- Chinese Taipei
- Japan
- South Korea

== Preliminary round ==
| Pos | Team | Pld | W | L | RF | RA | RD | PCT | GB | Qualification |
|---|---|---|---|---|---|---|---|---|---|---|
| 1 | China | 3 | 3 | 0 | 41 | 1 | +40 | 1.000 | — | Advance to Final round |
| 2 | Philippines | 3 | 1 | 2 | 13 | 14 | −1 | .333 | 2 | |
| 3 | Indonesia | 3 | 1 | 2 | 12 | 26 | −14 | .333 | 2 | |
| 4 | Pakistan | 3 | 1 | 2 | 11 | 36 | −25 | .333 | 2 | |

Source: International Baseball Federation

| 31 October 2003; 11:00 (UTC+9) | Indonesia | 5 – 11 | Pakistan | Sapporo Dome, Sapporo |
| 31 October 2003; 11:00 (UTC+9) | | Boxscore | | Sapporo Dome, Sapporo |

| 31 October 2003; 15:30 (UTC+9) | China | 7 – 1 | Philippines | Sapporo Dome, Sapporo |
| 31 October 2003; 15:30 (UTC+9) | | Boxscore | | Sapporo Dome, Sapporo |

| 1 November 2003; 11:00 (UTC+9) | Indonesia | 0 – 15 | China | Sapporo Dome, Sapporo |

| 1 November 2003; 15:30 (UTC+9) | Pakistan | 0 – 12 | Philippines | Sapporo Dome, Sapporo |
| 1 November 2003; 15:30 (UTC+9) | | Boxscore | | Sapporo Dome, Sapporo |

| 2 November 2003; 11:00 (UTC+9) | Philippines | 0 – 7 | Indonesia | Sapporo Dome, Sapporo |
| 2 November 2003; 11:00 (UTC+9) | | Boxscore | | Sapporo Dome, Sapporo |

| 2 November 2003; 15:30 (UTC+9) | Pakistan | 0 – 19 (F/7) | China | Sapporo Dome, Sapporo |
| 2 November 2003; 15:30 (UTC+9) | | Boxscore | | Sapporo Dome, Sapporo |

== Final round ==
| Pos | Team | Pld | W | L | RF | RA | RD | PCT | GB |
|---|---|---|---|---|---|---|---|---|---|
| 1 | Japan (H) | 3 | 3 | 0 | 24 | 1 | +23 | 1.000 | — |
| 2 | Chinese Taipei | 3 | 2 | 1 | 8 | 14 | −6 | .667 | 1 |
| 3 | South Korea | 3 | 1 | 2 | 10 | 8 | +2 | .333 | 2 |
| 4 | China | 3 | 0 | 3 | 3 | 22 | −19 | .000 | 3 |

Source: International Baseball Federation
(H) Hosts

| 5 November 2003; 12:00 (UTC+9) | Chinese Taipei | 5 – 4 | South Korea | Sapporo Dome, Sapporo |
| 5 November 2003; 12:00 (UTC+9) | | Boxscore | | Sapporo Dome, Sapporo |

| 5 November 2003; 18:30 (UTC+9) | China | 1 – 13 | Japan | Sapporo Dome, Sapporo |
| 5 November 2003; 18:30 (UTC+9) | | Boxscore | | Sapporo Dome, Sapporo |

| 6 November 2003; 12:00 (UTC+9) | South Korea | 6 – 1 | China | Sapporo Dome, Sapporo |
| 6 November 2003; 12:00 (UTC+9) | | Boxscore | | Sapporo Dome, Sapporo |

| 6 November 2003; 18:30 (UTC+9) | Japan | 9 – 0 | Chinese Taipei | Sapporo Dome, Sapporo |
| 6 November 2003; 18:30 (UTC+9) | | Boxscore | | Sapporo Dome, Sapporo |

| 7 November 2003; 12:00 (UTC+9) | Chinese Taipei | 3 – 1 | China | Sapporo Dome, Sapporo |

| 7 November 2003; 18:30 (UTC+9) | South Korea | 0 – 2 | Japan | Sapporo Dome, Sapporo |

== Final ranking ==
| Rank | Team |
|---|---|
| 1 | Japan |
| 2 | Chinese Taipei |
| 3 | South Korea |
| 4 | China |
| 5 | Philippines |
| 6 | Indonesia |
| 7 | Pakistan |

== Awards ==
Asian Championship Awards
| Award | Player |
|---|---|
| Most Valuable player | (Japan) Shinya Miyamoto |
| Best Pitcher | (Japan) Daisuke Matsuzaka |
| Leading Hitter | (Japan) Yoshinobu Takahashi |
| Most Runs Batted In | (Japan) Kosuke Fukudome |
