= List of Asian Games medalists in baseball =

This is the complete list of Asian Games medalists in baseball from 1994 to 2026.

== Men ==
Games	Gold	Silver	Bronze
1994 Hiroshima	Japan (JPN); Masaaki Daito; Masao Fujii; Norimasa Fujimine; Toshio Fukudome; Naoki Matsumoto; Nobuhiko Matsunaka; Masahiko Mori; Daishin Nakamura; Toshihisa Nishi; Hideaki Okubo; Hitoshi Ono; Minoru Saeki; Tomoaki Sato; Kazuki Sawada; Masanori Sugiura; Takayuki Takabayashi; Taisei Takagi; Jiro Toyoda; So Tsutsui; Masahiro Yamada	South Korea (KOR); An Hee-bong; Baek Jae-ho; Cha Myeong-ju; Cho Kyung-hwan; Cho Sung-min; Choi Ki-moon; Hong Won-ki; Jeon Byeong-ho; Jin Kab-yong; Kang Hyuk; Kim Jae-gul; Kim Jong-kook; Kwon O-yeong; Lee Byung-kyu; Lee Young-woo; Lim Sun-dong; Moon Dong-hwan; Park Jae-hong; Son Min-han; Wi Jae-yeong	Chinese Taipei (TPE); Chen Chun-hung; Chen Kai-fa; Ho Chih-fan; Hsieh Fu-guey; Hsu Sheng-chieh; Huang Ching-ching; Huang Hsin-fu; Huang Kan-lin; Huang Kuei-yu; Hung Chi-feng; Kao Chien-san; Liang Ju-hao; Lin Hung-yuan; Lin Sheng-hsiung; Lin Yueh-liang; Liu Chih-sheng; Wu Chun-liang; Wu Wen-yu; Yang Fu-chun; Yeh Chun-chang
1998 Bangkok	South Korea (KOR); Baek Jae-ho; Chang Young-kyoon; Cho In-sung; Choi Won-ho; Hong Sung-heon; Hwang Woo-gu; Jin Kab-yong; Kang Bong-kyu; Kang Chul-min; Kang Hyuk; Kim Byung-hyun; Kim Dong-joo; Kim Won-hyong; Kyung Hun-ho; Lee Byung-kyu; Lim Chang-yong; Park Chan-ho; Park Han-yi; Park Jae-hong; Seo Jae-weong; Shim Jae-hak; Shin Myung-chul	Japan (JPN); Shinnosuke Abe; Kokichi Akune; Mitsutaka Goto; Shoji Hirota; Tomohiro Iizuka; Yoshihiko Kajiyama; Satoshi Kashibuchi; Timmy Keenan; Masahiro Kimura; Naoki Matoba; Hitoshi Miyata; Koji Okumura; Yosuke Sunazuka; Kinji Tagashira; Hisanori Takahashi; Kenji Takahashi; Hideo Tamura; Naoyuki Tateishi; Yoshihito Uenaka; Michinao Yamamura	Chinese Taipei (TPE); Chang Tai-shan; Chen Chih-yuan; Chen Chin-feng; Cheng Chang-ming; Chuan Chin-her; Chueh Chuang-chen; Feng Sheng-hsien; Hsu Ming-chieh; Huang Chiung-lung; Huang Chung-yi; Kuo Lee Chien-fu; Lin Kun-han; Liu Yi-chuan; Pan Chung-wei; Shen Po-tsang; Tsai Wei-ting; Tsao Chun-yang; Tseng Chih-chen; Wang Kuang-huei; Wu Chao-hui; Wu Chun-liang; Yang Sung-hsien
2002 Busan	South Korea (KOR); Jang Sung-ho; Park Jin-man; Kim Han-soo; Lee Jong-beom; Lee Byung-kyu; Kim Dong-joo; Kim Min-jae; Kim Jong-kook; No Jang-jin; Lee Seung-ho; Song Jin-woo; Hong Sung-heon; Park Myung-hwan; Lee Young-woo; Lee Seung-yuop; Lim Chang-yong; Kim Jin-woo; Kim Sang-hoon; Lee Sang-hoon; Cho Yong-jun; Jung Jae-bok; Park Jae-hong	Chinese Taipei (TPE); Wang Chien-ming; Hong I-chung; Tsai Feng-an; Yang Sung-hsien; Chen Jui-cheng; Chen Chien-wei; Lin Yueh-ping; Chang Chia-hao; Liang Ju-hao; Huang Chin-chih; Huang Chung-yi; Tsai Chung-nan; Pan Wei-lun; Peng Cheng-min; Sun Chao-chi; Wang Chuan-chia; Cheng Chang-ming; Kao Chih-kang; Kuo Hong-chih; Chen Chih-yuan; Hsieh Chia-hsien; Wu Chao-hui	Japan (JPN); Daisuke Mori; Go Kida; Yosuke Shinomiya; Kenta Kurihara; Kazunari Tsuruoka; Satoshi Kubota; Keiichi Hirano; Takeshi Koyama; Takayuki Goto; Hiroya Tani; Kazuhiro Semba; Koji Onuma; Koji Yamamoto; Kanehisa Arime; Masanori Yasuda; Toshiyuki Kitagawa; Shingo Maeda; Takashi Yoshiura; Kazuhiro Hatakeyama; Hisao Arakane; Shiro Teramoto; Katsuhiro Nishiura
2006 Doha	Chinese Taipei (TPE); Yu Hsien-ming; Hu Chin-lung; Yang Chung-shou; Chen Yung-chi; Lee Chen-chang; Lin Yueh-ping; Pan Wei-lun; Lin Wei-chu; Yeh Chun-chang; Wang Chuan-chia; Lin Chih-sheng; Shih Chih-wei; Chen Feng-min; Tseng Sung-wei; Chang Tai-shan; Chen Chin-feng; Hsieh Chia-hsien; Kuo Hong-chih; Chang Chien-ming; Chiang Chien-ming; Keng Po-hsuan; Lin Ko-chien	Japan (JPN); Koichi Fukuda; Kanya Suzuki; Hisayoshi Chono; Yosuke Shinomiya; Yasuyuki Saigo; Keiji Ikebe; Kei Nomoto; Kenichi Yokoyama; Takeshi Koyama; Yasutaka Hattori; Naoki Miyanishi; Takuya Ishiguro; Shoji Saeki; Kentaro Takasaki; Hideto Isomura; Satoshi Komatsu; Kohei Hasebe; Daisuke Tanaka; Kenji Suzuki; Kosuke Ueyama; Shigeki Nakano; Takashi Yoshiura	South Korea (KOR); Jang Sung-ho; Park Jin-man; Jeong Keun-woo; Lee Byung-kyu; Lee Dae-ho; Lee Yong-kyu; Park Ki-hyuk; Yoon Suk-min; Oh Seung-hwan; Shin Chul-in; Lee Taek-keun; Lee Jin-young; Jung Min-hyuk; Cho In-sung; Kang Min-ho; Ryu Hyun-jin; Jang Won-sam; Lee Hei-chun; Son Min-han; Park Jae-hong; Cho Dong-chan; Woo Kyu-min
2010 Guangzhou	South Korea (KOR); An Ji-man; Cho Dong-chan; Jeong Keun-woo; Kim Kang-min; Lee Dae-ho; Son Si-hyun; Choi Jeong; Lee Yong-kyu; Kang Jung-ho; Choo Shin-soo; Chong Tae-hyon; Park Kyung-oan; Kim Myung-sung; Yoon Suk-min; Im Tae-hoon; Ko Chang-seong; Lee Jong-wook; Song Eun-beom; Kang Min-ho; Kim Hyun-soo; Bong Jung-keun; Kim Tae-kyun; Yang Hyeon-jong; Ryu Hyun-jin	Chinese Taipei (TPE); Hu Chin-lung; Lee Bing-yen; Lin Yi-chuan; Chen Yung-chi; Lin Ying-chieh; Lo Ching-lung; Pan Wei-lun; Hsiao Yi-chieh; Lin Kun-sheng; Kuo Yen-wen; Peng Cheng-min; Lin Che-hsuan; Lo Kuo-hui; Chen Chun-hsiu; Lin Chih-sheng; Kao Chih-kang; Yang Chien-fu; Chen Kuan-yu; Chang Tai-shan; Chang Chien-ming; Yang Yao-hsun; Lin Yi-hao; Huang Chih-lung; Chen Hung-wen	Japan (JPN); Mitsugu Kitamichi; Yusuke Ueda; Takuya Hashimoto; Ken Kume; Tomohisa Iwashita; Yuichi Tabata; Sho Ueno; Keiji Ikebe; Kenichi Yokoyama; Hidenori Watanabe; Yusuke Ishida; Takashi Fujita; Hirofumi Yamanaka; Koichi Kotaka; Kota Suda; Daiki Enokida; Manabu Mima; Atsushi Kobayashi; Yasuyuki Saigo; Ryo Saeki; Nariaki Kawasaki; Toshiyuki Hayashi; Hayata Ito; Tsugio Abe
2014 Incheon	South Korea (KOR); An Ji-man; Kim Min-sung; Kim Sang-su; Lee Jae-hak; Lim Chang-yong; Hwang Jae-gyun; Kang Jung-ho; Oh Jae-won; Lee Jae-won; Yoo Won-sang; Lee Tae-yang; Cha Woo-chan; Na Ji-wan; Kim Kwang-hyun; Son Ah-seop; Hong Seong-moo; Kang Min-ho; Na Sung-bum; Min Byung-hun; Kim Hyun-soo; Bong Jung-keun; Park Byung-ho; Yang Hyeon-jong; Han Hyun-hee	Chinese Taipei (TPE); Yang Hsien-hsien; Yu Meng-hsiung; Lin Ken-wei; Hsiao Po-ting; Wang Po-jung; Chen Pin-chieh; Chiang Chih-hsien; Lin Yi-hsiang; Chen Kuan-yu; Hu Chih-wei; Cheng Kai-wen; Lin Kun-sheng; Kuo Yen-wen; Wang Yao-lin; Chu Li-jen; Chen Chun-hsiu; Pan Chih-fang; Sung Chia-hao; Lo Kuo-hua; Jhang Jin-de; Lo Chia-jen; Chiang Shao-ching; Kuo Chun-lin; Lin Han	Japan (JPN); Takuya Fujishima; Issei Endo; Shun Ishikawa; Masahiro Nishino; Ryota Ishioka; Yuichi Tabata; Ken Tanaka; Toshihiko Kuramoto; Yusuke Ueda; Masataka Iryo; Tetsu Yokota; Takayuki Kato; Tsukasa Komatsu; Koshiro Imamura; Reo Moriyasu; Katsutoshi Satake; Takuaki Iguchi; Ryota Sekiya; Takeshi Kunimoto; Akira Matsumoto; Toshiyuki Hayashi; Shigeki Nakano; Taihei Fukuda; Ryota Ito
2018 Jakarta–Palembang	South Korea (KOR); Im Chan-kyu; Oh Ji-hwan; Kim Ha-seong; An Chi-hong; Hwang Jae-gyun; Park Min-woo; Lee Jung-hoo; Lee Jae-won; Kim Hyun-soo; Yang Eui-ji; Choi Won-tae; Son Ah-seop; Kim Jae-hwan; Im Gi-yeong; Jang Pill-joon; Lee Yong-chan; Park Jong-hun; Choi Chung-yeon; Park Byung-ho; Yang Hyeon-jong; Jung Woo-ram; Park Hae-min; Ham Deok-ju; Park Chi-guk	Japan (JPN); Koji Chikamoto; Junpei Horimai; Sho Aoyagi; Shoji Kitamura; Momotaro Matsumoto; Asahi Sato; Tsuyoshi Tamura; Michiori Okabe; Shohei Morishita; Junya Kino; Yuichiro Okano; Yuki Jibiki; Yudai Aranishi; Isamu Usui; Makoto Hori; Takumi Takahashi; Katsutoshi Satake; Akiyoshi Katsuno; Takehiro Tsujino; Kohei Sasagawa; Ryo Kinami; Ryoga Tomiyama; Takeshi Hosoyamada	Chinese Taipei (TPE); Lin Tzu-chieh; Hsiao Po-ting; Chen Jui-mu; Lin Han; Lin Chen-fei; Tai Ju-liang; Lin Chia-yu; Wu Sheng-feng; Lin Hua-ching; Tang Chia-chun; Wang Yu-pu; Shen Hao-wei; Tsai Wei-fan; Chan Tzu-hsien; Huang Chia-wei; Wang Tsung-hao; Chiang Chien-ming; Chen Wei-chih; Lin Yu-hsiang; Wang Cheng-hao; Chen Hsiao-yun; Chen Bo-hao; Lin Cheng-hsien; Huang Chien-lung
2022 Hangzhou	South Korea (KOR); Moon Dong-ju; Park Seong-han; Kim Hye-seong; Kim Ju-won; Roh Si-hwan; Kim Seong-yoon; Moon Bo-gyeong; Jang Hyun-seok; Jung Woo-young; Kim Young-kyu; Won Tae-in; Go Woo-suk; Park Se-woong; Kim Dong-heon; Kim Hyung-jun; Choi Won-jun; Choi Ji-min; Na Gyun-an; Gwak Been; Kang Baek-ho; Choi Ji-hoon; Kim Ji-chan; Park Yeong-hyun; Yoon Dong-hee	Chinese Taipei (TPE); Chen Min-sih; Lin Tzu-hao; Lin Tzu-wei; Li I-wei; Liao Chun-kai; Cheng Tsung-che; Lyle Lin; Gu Lin Ruei-yang; Liu Chih-jung; Wu Sheng-feng; Wang Yan-cheng; Shen Hao-wei; Wu Nien-ting; Lee Hao-yu; Chen Po-yu; Lin Yu-min; Cheng Hao-chun; Lai Po-wei; Yang Chen-yu; Wang Cheng-hao; Lin An-ko; Lin Li; Dai Pei-fong; Pan Wen-hui	Japan (JPN); Kazuya Shimokawa; Toshifumi Kaneko; Shoji Kitamura; Naoya Mochizuki; Hisaya Nammoku; Hiroki Nakagawa; Motoki Mukoyama; Jin Nakamura; Masashi Maruyama; Mizuki Kato; Yoshiki Fuchigami; Kisho Iwamoto; Makoto Hori; Yuki Katayama; Katsutoshi Satake; Shuichiro Kayo; Shunya Morita; Takehiro Tsujino; Kohei Sasagawa; Tatsuhiko Sato; Seifu Suzuki; Ryo Kinami; Ryuga Ihara; Junichi Tazawa
2026 Aichi–Nagoya	South Korea (KOR); Bae Chan-seung; Cho Hyeong-woo; Choi Jun-yong; Choi Min-seok; Gwak Been; Jeong Jun-jae; Jo Byeong-hyeon; Kim Do-yeong; Kim Geon-hee; Kim Ji-chan; Kim Jin-uk; Kim Ju-won; Kim Young-woo; Lee Jae-hyeon; Moon Bo-gyeong; Moon Hyun-bin; Oh Won-seok; Park Jae-hyun; Park Jun-soon; Park Yeong-hyun; Roh Si-hwan; So Hyeong-jun; Sung Yeong-tak; Yoon Dong-hee	Japan (JPN); Ryosuke Aizawa; Ryo Arima; Yoshiki Fuchigami; Ryosuke Fujisawa; Shogo Fukui; Shin Higuchi; Mizuki Kato; Shuichiro Kayo; Kazuki Kondo; Toyo Kumada; Masashi Maruyama; Wataru Matsuda; Shohei Mizutani; Motoki Mukoyama; Kento Nagano; Yuki Sato; Masato Shibasaki; Manami Soeda; Koki Taniwaki; Yuki Tsujimoto; Keita Wada; Kenta Yamada; Yukiya Yano	Chinese Taipei (TPE); Chang Hsiang; Chen Chen-wei; Chen Hsiao-yun; Chen Min-sih; Chu Chia-en; Guo Dinghong; Hsu Siang-sheng; Huang Chieh-han; Huang Wei-sheng; Kao Yu-wei; Kuo Tzu-chuan; Li I-wei; Lin Yi-wei; Lin Yu-li; Lin Yu-min; Liu Chih-jung; Liu Ji-hong; Tsai Wei-tai; Wang Cheng-hao; Wang Yan-cheng; Wang Yu-chieh; Yang Chen-yu; Yang Po-hsiang; Yu Tsung-ju
