= 2026 Asia Professional Baseball Championship rosters =

Team rosters

The following contains the team rosters for the 2026 Asia Professional Baseball Championship in Tokyo, Japan.

== Japan ==
- Manager: 66 Tadahito Iguchi
- Coaches: 99 So Taguchi, 40 Akinori Otsuka, 94 Shinji Kurano, 72 Yoshinori Murata, 80 Yuichi Honda, 74 Yusuke Kawada

Pos.	No.	Player	Date of birth (age)	Bats	Throws	Club
P	11	Yoshida Seiya	May 23, 2002 (aged 24)			(Japan) Chunichi Dragons
P	12	Kazuyuki Takemaru	February 26, 2002 (aged 24)			(Japan) Yomiuri Giants
P	14	Yutaro Ishida	January 22, 2002 (aged 24)			(Japan) Yokohama DeNA BayStars
P	16	Natsuki Takeuchi	July 21, 2001 (aged 25)			(Japan) Saitama Seibu Lions
P	19	Hiroto Takahashi	August 9, 2002 (aged 24)			(Japan) Chunichi Dragons
P	21	Yumeto Kanemaru	February 1, 2003 (aged 23)			(Japan) Chunichi Dragons
P	22	Taka Taichi	July 26, 2001 (aged 25)			(Japan) Hiroshima Toyo Carp
P	26	Suzuki Gota	August 31, 2003 (aged 23)			(Japan) Fukuoka SoftBank Hawks
P	28	Matsumoto Kengo	April 14, 1999 (aged 27)			(Japan) Tokyo Yakult Swallows
P	45	Kutani Ryu	November 5, 1999 (aged 26)			(Japan) Tohoku Rakuten Golden Eagles
P	47	Morita Shunya	February 11, 1997 (aged 29)			(Japan) Yomiuri Giants
P	52	Shinohara Hibiki	September 20, 2006 (aged 20)			(Japan) Saitama Seibu Lions
P	56	Nakamori Shunsuke	May 19, 2002 (aged 24)			(Japan) Chiba Lotte Marines
C	5	Shion Matsuo	July 16, 2004 (aged 22)			(Japan) Yokohama DeNA BayStars
C	7	Taiga Kojima	October 27, 2003 (aged 22)			(Japan) Saitama Seibu Lions
C	33	Yūya Shintō	March 10, 2002 (aged 24)			(Japan) Hokkaido Nippon-Ham Fighters
IF	1	Rui Muneyama	February 27, 2003 (aged 23)			(Japan) Tohoku Rakuten Golden Eagles
IF	8	Watanabe Seiya	August 31, 2002 (aged 24)			(Japan) Saitama Seibu Lions
IF	10	Sasaki Tai	December 24, 2002 (aged 23)			(Japan) Hiroshima Toyo Carp
IF	25	Shoji Yudai	October 2, 2002 (aged 24)			(Japan) Fukuoka SoftBank Hawks
IF	31	Tomoya Masaki	November 5, 1999 (aged 26)			(Japan) Fukuoka SoftBank Hawks
IF	51	Koki Yamaguchi	August 18, 2000 (aged 26)			(Japan) Chiba Lotte Marines
IF	54	Shū Yamagata	May 1, 2002 (aged 24)			(Japan) Hokkaido Nippon-Ham Fighters
OF	4	Ryūki Watarai	October 4, 2002 (aged 24)			(Japan) Yokohama DeNA BayStars
OF	6	Mishō Nishikawa	March 25, 2003 (aged 23)			(Japan) Chiba Lotte Marines
OF	44	Shunsuke Sasaki	November 6, 1999 (aged 26)			(Japan) Yomiuri Giants
OF	63	Shinya Hasegawa	May 17, 2002 (aged 24)			(Japan) Saitama Seibu Lions
OF	69	Tatsumi Konosuke	November 24, 2000 (aged 25)			(Japan) Hiroshima Toyo Carp

== Chinese Taipei ==
- Manager: 34 Kao Chih-kang
- Coaches: 31 Chen Chiang-ho, 40 Wang Chien-ming, 18 Pan Wei-lun, 28 Kuo-Hui Kao , 66 Chang Chien-ming, 94 Liu Chia-hao

Pos.	No.	Player	Date of birth (age)	Bats	Throws	Club
P	0	Lee Chao	October 23, 1999 (aged 26)			(Taiwan) Wei Chuan Dragons
P	17	Chen Mu-heng	March 23, 2006 (aged 20)			(Japan) Orix Buffaloes
P	19	Chen Ke-Yi	October 27, 1999 (aged 26)			(Taiwan) Rakuten Monkeys
P	27	Chung Yun-hua	September 27, 2003 (aged 23)			(Taiwan) Uni-President 7-Eleven Lions
P	29	Hsu Siang-sheng	December 17, 2005 (aged 20)			(Japan) Tokyo Yakult Swallows
P	30	Huang Chun	March 18, 2003 (aged 23)			(Taiwan) TSG Hawks
P	46	Chiu Chun-wei	November 10, 2002 (aged 23)			(Taiwan) Rakuten Monkeys
P	51	Lai Yin-hao	March 26, 2005 (aged 21)			(Taiwan) Rakuten Monkeys
P	54	Lin Tzu-wei	March 22, 2002 (aged 24)			(Taiwan) Rakuten Monkeys
P	62	Lee Chun	March 28, 2006 (aged 20)			(Taiwan) Uni-President 7-Eleven Lions
P	63	Kao Wei-chiang	September 18, 1999 (aged 27)			(Taiwan) Uni-President 7-Eleven Lions
P	71	Lu Meng-yang	May 19, 2004 (aged 22)			(Taiwan) CTBC Brothers
P	93	Chang Cheng-en	September 17, 2004 (aged 22)			(Taiwan) TSG Hawks
C	4	Chang Hsiang	January 22, 2003 (aged 23)			(Taiwan) Uni-President 7-Eleven Lions
C	7	Lin Wu Chen-wei	February 4, 2002 (aged 24)			(Taiwan) CTBC Brothers
C	91	Sung Jia-xiang	July 22, 2004 (aged 22)			(Taiwan) Rakuten Monkeys
IF	5	Wang Nian-hao	April 29, 2005 (aged 21)			(Taiwan) Fubon Guardians
IF	8	Chang Shr-lun	March 16, 2005 (aged 21)			(Taiwan) CTBC Brothers
IF	9	Chang Jen-wei	May 1, 2003 (aged 23)			(Taiwan) CTBC Brothers
IF	23	Liu Chun-wei	September 17, 2004 (aged 22)			(Taiwan) Wei Chuan Dragons
IF	24	Yang Po-hsiang	January 23, 2005 (aged 21)			(Japan) Tohoku Rakuten Golden Eagles
IF	47	Liu Tzu-hao	March 29, 2002 (aged 24)			(Taiwan) Uni-President 7-Eleven Lions
IF	67	Lin Hung-hsien	August 11, 2005 (aged 21)			(Taiwan) Uni-President 7-Eleven Lions
IF	78	Tung Tzu-en	February 28, 2003 (aged 23)			(Taiwan) Fubon Guardians
IF	95	Ma Chieh-sen	May 15, 2002 (aged 24)			(Taiwan) Rakuten Monkeys
OF	2	Kuo Tien-hsin	April 15, 2000 (aged 26)			(Taiwan) Wei Chuan Dragons
OF	20	Lin Chia-wei	January 11, 2005 (aged 21)			(Taiwan) Uni-President 7-Eleven Lions
OF	50	Zeng Sheng-an	March 28, 2006 (aged 20)			(Taiwan) Wei Chuan Dragons

== South Korea ==
- Manager: 92 Choi Won-ho
- Coaches: 99 Jeong Kyung-bae, 72 Cho Sung-hwan, 71 Park Jung-jin, 73 Choi Ki-moon, 82 Kim Jae-gul, 53 Lee Dae-hyung

Pos.	No.	Player	Date of birth (age)	Bats	Throws	Club
P	10	Kim Tae-hyeong	December 15, 2006 (aged 19)			(South Korea) Kia Tigers
P	11	Park Si-won	April 12, 2006 (aged 20)			(South Korea) LG Twins
P	14	Woo Kang-hoon	October 3, 2002 (aged 24)			(South Korea) LG Twins
P	15	Kim Jin-uk	July 5, 2002 (aged 24)			(South Korea) Lotte Giants
P	16	Lee Ro-un	September 11, 2004 (aged 22)			(South Korea) SSG Landers
P	36	Park Jeong-min	September 26, 2003 (aged 23)			(South Korea) Lotte Giants
P	39	Kim Keon-woo	July 12, 2002 (aged 24)			(South Korea) SSG Landers
P	40	Lee Jun-hyeok	June 30, 2003 (aged 23)			(South Korea) NC Dinos
P	41	Kim Min-jun	April 8, 2006 (aged 20)			(South Korea) SSG Landers
P	56	Choi Jun-yong	October 10, 2001 (aged 24)			(South Korea) Lotte Giants
P	57	Cho Dong-uk	November 2, 2004 (aged 21)			(South Korea) Hanwha Eagles
P	62	Jhun Jun-pyo	May 7, 2005 (aged 21)			(South Korea) Kiwoom Heroes
P	65	Sung Yeong-tak	July 28, 2004 (aged 22)			(South Korea) Kia Tigers
P	67	Kim Young-woo	January 14, 2005 (aged 21)			(South Korea) LG Twins
C	20	Cho Hyeong-woo	April 4, 2002 (aged 24)			(South Korea) SSG Landers
C	59	Heo In-seo	July 11, 2003 (aged 23)			(South Korea) Hanwha Eagles
IF	1	Kim Whee-jip	January 1, 2002 (aged 24)			(South Korea) NC Dinos
IF	5	Kim Do-yeong	October 2, 2003 (aged 23)			(South Korea) Kia Tigers
IF	7	Kim Ju-won	July 30, 2002 (aged 24)			(South Korea) NC Dinos
IF	13	Lee Jae-hyeon	February 4, 2003 (aged 23)			(South Korea) Samsung Lions
IF	22	Moon Jeong-bin	August 15, 2003 (aged 23)			(South Korea) LG Twins
IF	25	Han Dong-hui	June 1, 1999 (aged 27)			(South Korea) Lotte Giants
IF	52	An Jae-seok	February 15, 2002 (aged 24)			(South Korea) Doosan Bears
OF	2	Kim Min-suk	May 9, 2004 (aged 22)			(South Korea) Doosan Bears
OF	23	Ahn Hyun-min	August 22, 2003 (aged 23)			(South Korea) KT Wiz
OF	47	Park Jae-hyun	December 8, 2006 (aged 19)			(South Korea) Kia Tigers
OF	51	Moon Hyun-bin	April 20, 2004 (aged 22)			(South Korea) Hanwha Eagles
OF	53	Kim Ji-chan	March 8, 2001 (aged 25)			(South Korea) Samsung Lions

== Australia ==
- Manager: 14 Dave Nilsson
- Coaches: 21 Josh Tols, 33 Jim Bennett, 12 Damian Shanahan, 4 Andrew Kyle

Pos.	No.	Player	Date of birth (age)	Bats	Throws	Club
P	8	Jordan Power	September 26, 1998 (aged 28)			(Australia) Perth Heat
P	9	Koskei Partington-Hopes	January 22, 2003 (aged 23)			(Australia) Perth Heat
P	15	Rubens Romero	April 4, 2007 (aged 19)			(Canada) Toronto Blue Jays
P	19	Luke Krkovski	September 5, 2002 (aged 24)			(Australia) Brisbane Bandits
P	20	Aidan Torpey	June 25, 2001 (aged 25)			(Australia) Sydney Blue Sox
P	23	Matt Beattie	January 5, 1999 (aged 27)			(Australia) Brisbane Bandits
P	26	Ky Hampton	April 10, 2000 (aged 26)			(Australia) Adelaide Giants
P	27	Jackson Grounds	July 13, 2004 (aged 22)			(Australia) Brisbane Bandits
P	30	Liam Doolan	October 11, 1998 (aged 27)			(Australia) Sydney Blue Sox
P	36	Adam Bates	August 8, 2005 (aged 21)			(United States) Boston Red Sox
P	38	Ben Walmsley	February 12, 2004 (aged 22)			(Australia) Brisbane Bandits
P	41	Joshua Bishopp	October 3, 2001 (aged 25)			(Australia) Sydney Blue Sox
P	46	Kieren Hall	May 10, 2001 (aged 25)			(Australia) Perth Heat
P	51	Conor Myles	June 14, 2001 (aged 25)			(Australia) Melbourne Aces (Ind League)
P	54	Brodie Cooper-Vassalakis	December 5, 2000 (aged 25)			(Australia) Brisbane Bandits
P	65	Cooper Morgan	November 8, 2001 (aged 24)			(Australia) Adelaide Giants
C	10	Alex Hall	August 6, 1999 (aged 27)			(Australia) Perth Heat
C	11	Zak Skinner	November 8, 2001 (aged 24)			(Australia) Melbourne Aces (Ind League)
IF	1	Jaylin Rae	May 15, 2001 (aged 25)			(Australia) Sydney Blue Sox
IF	2	Byron Armstrong	January 23, 2001 (aged 25)			(Australia) Perth Heat
IF	3	Jo Stevens	April 9, 2001 (aged 25)			(Australia) Sydney Blue Sox
IF	6	Jayden Kim	June 8, 2006 (aged 20)			(United States) Pittsburgh Pirates
IF	16	Brent Iredale	December 17, 2003 (aged 22)			(United States) Pittsburgh Pirates
IF	17	Blake Cavill	April 5, 2002 (aged 24)			(Australia) Sydney Blue Sox
IF	18	Alex Skepton	May 10, 2001 (aged 25)			(Australia) Brisbane Bandits
IF	25	Clayton Campbell	September 11, 2003 (aged 23)			(United States) Detroit Tigers
OF	7	Max Durrington	February 13, 2007 (aged 19)			(United States) Athletics
OF	34	Chris Burke	August 16, 2001 (aged 25)			(Australia) Melbourne Aces (Ind League)
