= Baseball at the 2026 Asian Games =

- Venue: Okazaki Municipal Baseball Stadium; Toyohashi Municipal Baseball Stadium
- Dates: 21 – 27 September 2026
- Competitors: 189 from 8 nations

Medalists
gold medal	South Korea
silver medal	Japan
bronze medal	Chinese Taipei

Men's baseball at the 2026 Asian Games was held between 21 and 27 September 2026 at two locations in Aichi Prefecture. Featuring 8 teams in two groups, it marked the first baseball event at the Asian Games with a one-stage preliminary round since 2014.

== Schedule ==
The schedule is as follows:

P	Preliminary round	S	Super round	F	Finals

Event↓/Date →	21st Mon	22nd Tue	23rd Wed	24th Thu	25th Fri	26th Sat	27th Sun
Men	P	P	P		S	S	F

== Venues ==
Okazaki	Toyohashi
Okazaki Municipal Baseball Stadium	Toyohashi Municipal Baseball Stadium
Capacity: 20,000	Capacity: 15,895

== Squads ==
Squads

China	Hong Kong	Japan	South Korea
Luan Chenchen; Sun Guangxuan; Wu Anjun; Suo Xudi; Jing Hui; Sun Yicong; Wang Weiyi; Wang Lizi; Ju Haoyu; Zhang Yinfan; Fu Huachen; Cao Jie; Wang Lei; Fu Wenlong; Zhu Xudong; Zhang Mingxin; Li Xiaoyang; Li Ningji; Wang Xiang; Chen Chen; Han Xiao; Li Yanen; Zhou Yi; Huadan Cairang	Chan Cheuk Kiu; Ma Hon Man Ashley; Mok Chun Lam; Fung Anson; Lee Ho Chi Ryan; Chan Alexander Cheuk Hei; Hung Wang Chak; Mok Chun Pui; Lam Lai Him; Cheng Hoi Ting; Lee Long Ching; Tsui Chak Pui; Wen Tsz Yin Jordan; Wu Tsz Tung; Tam Ho Yin Benny; Chan Sze Yue; Leung Ka Ho Sam; Tsang Kin Nam; Kwok Ching Connor; Yung Tsun Wai; Fong Chun Hei; Ng Yau Pang; Wong Yui Fung; Cheng Yu Hin Oscar	Yukiya Yano; Keita Wada; Masato Shibasaki; Manami Soeda; Toyo Kumada; Kenta Yamada; Yuki Sato; Motoki Mukoyama; Ryo Arima; Ryosuke Aizawa; Kazuki Kondo; Shin Higuchi; Koki Taniwaki; Shuichiro Kayo; Mizuki Kato; Yoshiki Fuchigami; Kento Nagano; Wataru Matsuda; Ryosuke Fujisawa; Masashi Maruyama; Yuki Tsujimoto; Shogo Fukui; Shohei Mizutani	Moon Bo-gyeong; Jeong Jun-jae; Kim Do-yeong; Kim Ju-won; Roh Si-hwan; Kim Geon-hee; Lee Jae-hyeon; Park Jae-hyun; Kim Jin-uk; Kim Young-woo; Jo Byeong-hyeon; Cho Hyeong-woo; Oh Won-seok; So Hyeong-jun; Gwak Been; Moon Hyun-bin; Park Jun-soon; Bae Chan-seung; Choi Jun-yong; Kim Ji-chan; Park Yeong-hyeon; Sung Yeong-tak; Choi Min-seok; Yoon Dong-hee
Philippines	Palestine	Thailand	Chinese Taipei
Jennald Pareja; Renato Samuel Jr.; Junmar Diarao; Mar-joseph Carolino; James Vincent Nisnisan; John Reymond Vargas; Erwin Bosito; Mark Steven Manaig; Romeo Jasmin Jr.; Liam Alexei de Vera; Raymond Nerosa; Cer Gio Gorpido; Mark John Philip Beronilla; Amiel de Guzman; Nigel Paule; Joshua Pineda; Razhley Santos; John Leonel Matanguihan; Joven Kenneth Maulit; Ferdinand Liguayan Jr.; Francis Thomas Gonzaga; Kent Joerend Altarejos	Dylan Ahmad; Yousef Abbasi; Faris Thabata; Tripp Haddad; Steven Mufareh; Patrick Khoury; Ahmad Ghouleh; Luke Shahinkubty; Kyle Bader; David Powres; Yacoub Rayan; Syam Lafi; Rumsey Yasin; Adnan Jaber; Nicolas Barksdale; Yunis Shehab Rezeq Haleem; Hasan Ammar; Ahmad Harjli; Paul Baba; Joseph Yabbour; Tarik Elabour; Tariq Suboh; Abdelraheem Dolah; Omar Shublaq	Naruephol Muangkasem; Oliver Dunn; Ryan Kehoe; Anuchit Lungloek; Nattapon Chaichuay; Joseph Daru; Nattapat Uamwilai; Alexander Clark; Teetat Suwannasang; Gabriel Buranasiri; Setthawut Bucha; Yuri Kayanuma; Phuriphat Promma; Suppakorn Lin; Linus Oudom; Nanthawat Maneesiri; Jake Chaisongkram; Phuttabut Petsunthad; Piyathat Saibuakaew; Phongsathon Nituthon; Porrawit Wongsuwan; Yusuke Ryoto; Yuthai Ryoto; Jiraphat Saengnak	Chen Min-sih; Lin Yu-li; Li I-wei; Chu Chia-en; Kuo Tzu-chuan; Liu Chih-jung; Wang Yu-chieh; Wang Yan-cheng; Guo Dinghong; Huang Wei-sheng; Yang Po-hsiang; Hsu Siang-sheng; Kao Yu-wei; Chang Hsiang; Lin Yu-min; Liu Ji-hong; Yang Chen-yu; Chen Chen-wei; Lin Yi-wei; Wang Cheng-hao; Chen Hsiao-yun; Huang Chieh-han; Yu Tsung-ju; Tsai Wei-tai

== Draw ==
The participating teams and their groups were decided on 10 July 2026. The teams were distributed according to their position at the WBSC World Rankings.

Group A

- Japan
- China
- Philippines
- Palestine

Group B

- Chinese Taipei
- South Korea
- Hong Kong
- Thailand

== Results ==
All times are local Japan Standard Time (UTC+9).

=== Preliminary round ===
==== Group A ====
Pos	Team	Pld	W	L	RF	RA	PCT	GB	Qualification
1	Japan	3	3	0	33	3	1.000	—	Super round
2	China	3	2	1	27	20	.667	1	Super round
3	Philippines	3	1	2	20	22	.333	2	Placement round
4	Palestine	3	0	3	1	36	.000	3	Placement round

21 September; 12:00	Philippines	12–0 (F/7)	Palestine	Toyohashi Municipal Baseball Stadium, Toyohashi; Attendance: 674; Umpires: Atsushi Daito (JPN)
21 September; 12:00	WP: Romeo Jasmin Jr.	Boxscore	LP: Steven Mufareh	Toyohashi Municipal Baseball Stadium, Toyohashi; Attendance: 674; Umpires: Atsushi Daito (JPN)
21 September; 12:00	HR: Mark Beronilla, Ferdinand Liguayan	Boxscore		Toyohashi Municipal Baseball Stadium, Toyohashi; Attendance: 674; Umpires: Atsushi Daito (JPN)

Team	1	2	3	4	5	6	7	8	9	R	H	E
Philippines	4	0	0	0	0	5	3	—	—	12	14	0
Palestine	0	0	0	0	0	0	0	—	—	0	2	3

21 September; 18:30	Japan	11–3	China	Toyohashi Municipal Baseball Stadium, Toyohashi; Attendance: 5,230; Umpires: Kim Minseo (KOR)
21 September; 18:30	WP: Shin Higuchi	Boxscore	LP: Wang Xiang	Toyohashi Municipal Baseball Stadium, Toyohashi; Attendance: 5,230; Umpires: Kim Minseo (KOR)
21 September; 18:30		Boxscore	HR: Luan Chenchen	Toyohashi Municipal Baseball Stadium, Toyohashi; Attendance: 5,230; Umpires: Kim Minseo (KOR)

Team	1	2	3	4	5	6	7	8	9	R	H	E
Japan	0	0	0	3	1	6	0	0	1	11	12	0
China	0	1	0	0	0	0	0	2	0	3	9	7

22 September; 12:00	China	15–8	Philippines	Okazaki Municipal Baseball Stadium, Okazaki; Attendance: 784; Umpires: Fukazawa Shunichi (JPN)
22 September; 12:00	WP: Wu Anjun	Boxscore	LP: Amiel de Guzman	Okazaki Municipal Baseball Stadium, Okazaki; Attendance: 784; Umpires: Fukazawa Shunichi (JPN)

Team	1	2	3	4	5	6	7	8	9	R	H	E
China	0	6	0	1	5	3	0	0	0	15	16	1
Philippines	0	0	0	3	1	2	0	2	0	8	12	4

22 September; 18:30	Palestine	0–15 (F/5)	Japan	Okazaki Municipal Baseball Stadium, Okazaki; Attendance: 4,500; Umpires: Yang Jae-man (KOR)
22 September; 18:30	LP: Ahmad Harajli	Boxscore	WP: Wataru Matsuda	Okazaki Municipal Baseball Stadium, Okazaki; Attendance: 4,500; Umpires: Yang Jae-man (KOR)
22 September; 18:30		Boxscore	HR: Kenta Yamada	Okazaki Municipal Baseball Stadium, Okazaki; Attendance: 4,500; Umpires: Yang Jae-man (KOR)

Team	1	2	3	4	5	6	7	8	9	R	H	E
Palestine	0	0	0	0	0	—	—	—	—	0	0	3
Japan	5	6	3	0	1	—	—	—	—	15	11	0

23 September; 12:00	Philippines	0–7	Japan	Toyohashi Municipal Baseball Stadium, Toyohashi; Attendance: 7,928; Umpires: Tsung-Hsin Chen (TPE)
23 September; 12:00	LP: Raymond Nerosa	Boxscore	WP: Kento Nagano	Toyohashi Municipal Baseball Stadium, Toyohashi; Attendance: 7,928; Umpires: Tsung-Hsin Chen (TPE)

Team	1	2	3	4	5	6	7	8	9	R	H	E
Philippines	0	0	0	0	0	0	0	0	0	0	3	3
Japan	0	2	3	0	0	2	0	0	X	7	6	0

23 September; 18:30	Palestine	1–9	China	Okazaki Municipal Baseball Stadium, Okazaki; Attendance: 188; Umpires: Shinya Takahashi (JPN)
23 September; 18:30	LP: Brent Powers	Boxscore	WP: Sun Yicong	Okazaki Municipal Baseball Stadium, Okazaki; Attendance: 188; Umpires: Shinya Takahashi (JPN)

Team	1	2	3	4	5	6	7	8	9	R	H	E
Palestine	0	0	0	0	0	0	1	0	0	1	11	5
China	0	0	1	0	1	0	0	7	X	9	13	1

==== Group B ====
Pos	Team	Pld	W	L	RF	RA	PCT	GB	Qualification
1	South Korea	3	3	0	36	1	1.000	—	Super round
2	Chinese Taipei	3	2	1	26	5	.667	1	Super round
3	Thailand	3	1	2	11	40	.333	2	Placement round
4	Hong Kong	3	0	3	7	34	.000	3	Placement round

21 September; 12:00	Hong Kong	7–10	Thailand	Okazaki Municipal Baseball Stadium, Okazaki; Attendance: 1,568; Umpires: Chen Te-jung (TPE)
21 September; 12:00	LP: Ho Chi Ryan Lee	Boxscore	WP: Promma Phuriphat	Okazaki Municipal Baseball Stadium, Okazaki; Attendance: 1,568; Umpires: Chen Te-jung (TPE)

Team	1	2	3	4	5	6	7	8	9	R	H	E
Hong Kong	0	0	0	0	1	0	6	0	0	7	10	1
Thailand	0	0	0	0	2	0	1	7	X	10	12	2

21 September; 18:30	Chinese Taipei	0–5	South Korea	Okazaki Municipal Baseball Stadium, Okazaki; Attendance: 3,168; Umpires: Masaoki Ichiki (JPN)
21 September; 18:30	LP: Lin Yi-Wei	Boxscore	WP: Gwak Been	Okazaki Municipal Baseball Stadium, Okazaki; Attendance: 3,168; Umpires: Masaoki Ichiki (JPN)
21 September; 18:30		Boxscore	HR: Yoon Dong-hee	Okazaki Municipal Baseball Stadium, Okazaki; Attendance: 3,168; Umpires: Masaoki Ichiki (JPN)

Team	1	2	3	4	5	6	7	8	9	R	H	E
Chinese Taipei	0	0	0	0	0	0	0	0	0	0	2	1
South Korea	0	1	0	0	0	0	2	2	X	5	6	0

22 September; 12:00	Thailand	0–15 (F/6)	Chinese Taipei	Toyohashi Municipal Baseball Stadium, Toyohashi; Attendance: 737; Umpires: Wang Tianyi (CHN)
22 September; 12:00	LP: Suppakorn Lin	Boxscore	WP: Yu Tsung-JU	Toyohashi Municipal Baseball Stadium, Toyohashi; Attendance: 737; Umpires: Wang Tianyi (CHN)
22 September; 12:00		Boxscore	HR: Liu Ji-Hong, Chen Min-Sih	Toyohashi Municipal Baseball Stadium, Toyohashi; Attendance: 737; Umpires: Wang Tianyi (CHN)

Team	1	2	3	4	5	6	7	8	9	R	H	E
Thailand	0	0	0	0	0	0	—	—	—	0	2	4
Chinese Taipei	6	2	2	3	0	2	—	—	—	15	10	0

22 September; 18:30	South Korea	13–0	Hong Kong	Toyohashi Municipal Baseball Stadium, Toyohashi; Attendance: 1,277; Umpires: Chieh Hsu (TPE)
22 September; 18:30	WP: Kim Jin-uk	Boxscore	LP: Mok Chun Pui	Toyohashi Municipal Baseball Stadium, Toyohashi; Attendance: 1,277; Umpires: Chieh Hsu (TPE)
22 September; 18:30	HR: Roh Si-hwan, Cho Hyeong-woo	Boxscore		Toyohashi Municipal Baseball Stadium, Toyohashi; Attendance: 1,277; Umpires: Chieh Hsu (TPE)

Team	1	2	3	4	5	6	7	8	9	R	H	E
South Korea	2	1	4	0	3	0	3	—	—	13	14	0
Hong Kong	0	0	0	0	0	0	0	—	—	0	0	1

23 September; 12:00	Thailand	1–18 (F/5)	South Korea	Okazaki Municipal Baseball Stadium, Okazaki; Attendance: 520; Umpires: Guan Leyu (CHN)
23 September; 12:00	LP: Alexander Clark	Boxscore	WP: Oh Won-seok	Okazaki Municipal Baseball Stadium, Okazaki; Attendance: 520; Umpires: Guan Leyu (CHN)
23 September; 12:00		Boxscore	HR: Park Jae-hyun, Moon Bo-gyeong, Park Jun-soon	Okazaki Municipal Baseball Stadium, Okazaki; Attendance: 520; Umpires: Guan Leyu (CHN)

Team	1	2	3	4	5	6	7	8	9	R	H	E
Thailand	0	0	0	0	1	–	–	–	–	1	2	1
South Korea	3	4	3	8	–	–	–	–	–	18	14	1

23 September; 18:30	Hong Kong	0–11 (F/7)	Chinese Taipei	Toyohashi Municipal Baseball Stadium, Toyohashi; Attendance: 781; Umpires: Naoya Yamashita (JPN)
23 September; 18:30	LP: Kwok Ching	Boxscore	WP: Kuo Tzu-Chuan	Toyohashi Municipal Baseball Stadium, Toyohashi; Attendance: 781; Umpires: Naoya Yamashita (JPN)

Team	1	2	3	4	5	6	7	8	9	R	H	E
Hong Kong	0	0	0	0	0	0	0	–	–	0	2	1
Chinese Taipei	1	1	0	0	5	4	–	–	–	11	8	0

=== Placement round ===
- The results of the matches between the same teams that were already played during the preliminary round shall be taken into account for the placement round.

Pos	Team	Pld	W	L	RF	RA	PCT	GB
1	Philippines	3	2	1	35	14	.667	—
2	Thailand	3	2	1	18	25	.667	—
3	Hong Kong	3	1	2	16	22	.333	1
4	Palestine	3	1	2	7	15	.333	1

25 September; 12:00	Philippines	18–7 (F/7)	Thailand	Okazaki Municipal Baseball Stadium, Okazaki; Attendance: 1,199; Umpires: Patrick Ng (HKG)
25 September; 12:00	WP: Liam Alexei De Vera	Boxscore	LP: Phuriphat Promma	Okazaki Municipal Baseball Stadium, Okazaki; Attendance: 1,199; Umpires: Patrick Ng (HKG)

Team	1	2	3	4	5	6	7	8	9	R	H	E
Philippines	2	3	6	1	4	2	0	—	—	18	16	3
Thailand	0	1	1	4	0	0	1	—	—	7	12	1

25 September; 12:00	Palestine	7–2	Hong Kong	Toyohashi Municipal Baseball Stadium, Toyohashi; Attendance: 273; Umpires: Roland Siacor (PHI)
25 September; 12:00	WP: Rayan Yacoub	Boxscore	LP: Chun Hei Fong	Toyohashi Municipal Baseball Stadium, Toyohashi; Attendance: 273; Umpires: Roland Siacor (PHI)
25 September; 12:00		Boxscore	HR: Tsun Wai Yung	Toyohashi Municipal Baseball Stadium, Toyohashi; Attendance: 273; Umpires: Roland Siacor (PHI)

Team	1	2	3	4	5	6	7	8	9	R	H	E
Palestine	1	0	0	0	0	0	3	2	1	7	9	2
Hong Kong	0	0	1	0	0	0	1	0	0	2	8	1

26 September; 12:00	Palestine	0–1 (F/10)	Thailand	Okazaki Municipal Baseball Stadium, Okazaki; Attendance: 368; Umpires: Shunichi Fukazawa (JPN)
26 September; 12:00	LP: Brent Powers	Boxscore	WP: Gabriel Pongsiri Buranasiri	Okazaki Municipal Baseball Stadium, Okazaki; Attendance: 368; Umpires: Shunichi Fukazawa (JPN)

Team	1	2	3	4	5	6	7	8	9	10	R	H	E
Palestine	0	0	0	0	0	0	0	0	0	0	0	3	1
Thailand	0	0	0	0	0	0	0	0	0	1	1	5	1

26 September; 12:00	Hong Kong	7–5	Philippines	Toyohashi Municipal Baseball Stadium, Toyohashi; Attendance: 580; Umpires: Jirapat Lapikun (THA)
26 September; 12:00	WP: Alexander Cheuk-Hei Chan; Sv: Chun Hei Fung	Boxscore	LP: Romeo Jasmin Jr.	Toyohashi Municipal Baseball Stadium, Toyohashi; Attendance: 580; Umpires: Jirapat Lapikun (THA)

Team	1	2	3	4	5	6	7	8	9	R	H	E
Hong Kong	0	0	0	2	3	0	2	0	0	7	8	4
Philippines	0	2	0	0	0	0	3	0	0	5	4	2

=== Super round ===
The results of the matches between the same teams that were already played during the preliminary round shall be taken into account for the super round.

Pos	Team	Pld	W	L	RF	RA	PCT	GB	Qualification
1	Japan	3	3	0	23	6	1.000	—	Gold medal game
2	South Korea	3	2	1	14	7	.667	1	Gold medal game
3	Chinese Taipei	3	1	2	12	13	.333	2	Bronze medal game
4	China	3	0	3	6	29	.000	3	Bronze medal game

25 September; 18:30	Chinese Taipei	9–1	China	Okazaki Municipal Baseball Stadium, Okazaki; Attendance: 900; Umpires: Kim Minseo (KOR)
25 September; 18:30	WP: Wang Yan-cheng	Boxscore	LP: Xudi Suo	Okazaki Municipal Baseball Stadium, Okazaki; Attendance: 900; Umpires: Kim Minseo (KOR)
25 September; 18:30		Boxscore	HR: Chenchen Luan	Okazaki Municipal Baseball Stadium, Okazaki; Attendance: 900; Umpires: Kim Minseo (KOR)

Team	1	2	3	4	5	6	7	8	9	R	H	E
Chinese Taipei	2	0	0	1	0	0	0	4	2	9	13	1
China	0	0	0	0	0	1	0	0	0	1	9	1

25 September; 18:30	South Korea	0–5	Japan	Toyohashi Municipal Baseball Stadium, Toyohashi; Attendance: 2,759; Umpires: Chieh Hsu (TPE)
25 September; 18:30	LP: So Hyeong-jun	Boxscore	WP: Shin Higuchi	Toyohashi Municipal Baseball Stadium, Toyohashi; Attendance: 2,759; Umpires: Chieh Hsu (TPE)

Team	1	2	3	4	5	6	7	8	9	R	H	E
South Korea	0	0	0	0	0	0	0	0	0	0	4	1
Japan	0	0	3	0	0	2	0	0	X	5	9	0

26 September; 18:30	Chinese Taipei	3–7	Japan	Okazaki Municipal Baseball Stadium, Okazaki; Attendance: 3,100; Umpires: Yang Jaeman (KOR)
26 September; 18:30	LP: Shiang-Sheng Hsu	Boxscore	WP: Kazuki Kondo	Okazaki Municipal Baseball Stadium, Okazaki; Attendance: 3,100; Umpires: Yang Jaeman (KOR)
26 September; 18:30		Boxscore	HR: Masashi Maruyama	Okazaki Municipal Baseball Stadium, Okazaki; Attendance: 3,100; Umpires: Yang Jaeman (KOR)

Team	1	2	3	4	5	6	7	8	9	R	H	E
Chinese Taipei	1	0	0	0	0	0	1	0	1	3	11	1
Japan	0	0	2	0	1	0	2	2	X	7	13	3

26 September; 18:30	China	2–9	South Korea	Toyohashi Municipal Baseball Stadium, Toyohashi; Attendance: 1,100; Umpires: Chen Te-jung (TPE)
26 September; 18:30	LP: Wu Anjun	Boxscore	WP: Choi Min-seok	Toyohashi Municipal Baseball Stadium, Toyohashi; Attendance: 1,100; Umpires: Chen Te-jung (TPE)

Team	1	2	3	4	5	6	7	8	9	R	H	E
China	1	0	0	0	0	0	0	0	1	2	10	3
South Korea	2	2	0	0	0	2	2	1	X	9	14	0

=== Final round ===
==== Bronze medal match ====
27 September; 12:00	China	1–5	Chinese Taipei	Okazaki Municipal Baseball Stadium, Okazaki; Attendance: 2,530; Umpires: Masashi Ichiki (JPN)
27 September; 12:00	LP: Yicong Sun	Boxscore	WP: Yu-Min Lin	Okazaki Municipal Baseball Stadium, Okazaki; Attendance: 2,530; Umpires: Masashi Ichiki (JPN)

Team	1	2	3	4	5	6	7	8	9	R	H	E
China	0	0	0	0	0	0	0	0	1	1	3	0
Chinese Taipei	0	0	2	0	0	0	3	0	X	5	13	0

==== Gold medal match ====
27 September; 18:30	South Korea	3–1	Japan	Toyohashi Municipal Baseball Stadium, Toyohashi; Attendance: 6,153; Umpires: Chen Tsung-Hsin (TPE)
27 September; 18:30	WP: Jo Byeong-hyeon; Sv: Park Yeong-hyun	Boxscore	LP: Kazuki Kondo	Toyohashi Municipal Baseball Stadium, Toyohashi; Attendance: 6,153; Umpires: Chen Tsung-Hsin (TPE)

Team	1	2	3	4	5	6	7	8	9	R	H	E
South Korea	0	1	0	0	0	0	0	2	0	3	12	1
Japan	0	0	0	0	0	0	1	0	0	1	7	0

== Final standing ==
Rank	Team	Pld	W	L
1st place, gold medalist(s)	South Korea	6	5	1
2nd place, silver medalist(s)	Japan	6	5	1
3rd place, bronze medalist(s)	Chinese Taipei	6	4	2
4	China	6	2	4
5	Philippines	5	2	3
6	Thailand	5	2	3
7	Palestine	5	1	4
8	Hong Kong	5	1	4

== Medalists ==
Event	Gold	Silver	Bronze
Men	South Korea; Bae Chan-seung; Cho Hyeong-woo; Choi Jun-yong; Choi Min-seok; Gwak Been; Jeong Jun-jae; Jo Byeong-hyeon; Kim Do-yeong; Kim Geon-hee; Kim Ji-chan; Kim Jin-uk; Kim Ju-won; Kim Young-woo; Lee Jae-hyeon; Moon Bo-gyeong; Moon Hyun-bin; Oh Won-seok; Park Jae-hyun; Park Jun-soon; Park Yeong-hyun; Roh Si-hwan; So Hyeong-jun; Sung Yeong-tak; Yoon Dong-hee	Japan; Ryosuke Aizawa; Ryo Arima; Yoshiki Fuchigami; Ryosuke Fujisawa; Shogo Fukui; Shin Higuchi; Mizuki Kato; Shuichiro Kayo; Kazuki Kondo; Toyo Kumada; Masashi Maruyama; Wataru Matsuda; Shohei Mizutani; Motoki Mukoyama; Kento Nagano; Yuki Sato; Masato Shibasaki; Manami Soeda; Koki Taniwaki; Yuki Tsujimoto; Keita Wada; Kenta Yamada; Yukiya Yano	Chinese Taipei; Chang Hsiang; Chen Chen-wei; Chen Hsiao-yun; Chen Min-sih; Chu Chia-en; Guo Dinghong; Hsu Siang-sheng; Huang Chieh-han; Huang Wei-sheng; Kao Yu-wei; Kuo Tzu-chuan; Li I-wei; Lin Yi-wei; Lin Yu-li; Lin Yu-min; Liu Chih-jung; Liu Ji-hong; Tsai Wei-tai; Wang Cheng-hao; Wang Yan-cheng; Wang Yu-chieh; Yang Chen-yu; Yang Po-hsiang; Yu Tsung-ju
