= 2026 Asia Professional Baseball Championship =

- ラグザス アジアプロ野球チャンピオンシップ2026

Tournament details
- Country: Japan
- City: (Japan) Tokyo
- Dates: November 12–15
- Teams: 4
- Defending champions: Japan

Final positions
- Champions: Japan (3rd title)
- Runners-up: South Korea
- Third place: Australia
- Fourth place: Chinese Taipei

Tournament statistics
- Games played: 8
- Attendance: 160,021 (20,003 per game)

Awards
- MVP: (Japan) Rui Muneyama

The 2026 Asia Professional Baseball Championship (APBC 2026), sanctioned by the World Baseball Softball Confederation (WBSC) and organized by the three professional east asian baseball leagues (NPB, KBO and CPBL) alongside Baseball Australia, is the third edition of APBC, and is being held at the Tokyo Dome in Japan from November 12 to 15. It was sponsored by RAXUS and held under the name (Asia Professional Baseball Championship 2026 presented by RAXUS)

== Participating teams ==
- Chinese Taipei
- Japan
- South Korea
- Australia

=== Rosters ===
Only players born in 1993 or later, or that have less than three years of professional experience are eligible for the competition. However, teams are also allowed up to three wild cards which do not meet either of these criteria.

== Format ==
Each of the three teams participated in a round-robin series, playing each other team once. The two teams with the best win-loss percentage faced each other in the final, with the team finishing higher considered the "home team", meaning that they had the advantage of batting last.

== Standings ==
All times are local Japan Standard Time (UTC+9).

Pos	Team	Pld	W	L	RF	RA	PCT	GB	Qualification
1	Japan (H)	3	3	0	30	6	1.000	—	Final Match
2	South Korea	3	1	2	18	21	.333	2	Final Match
3	Chinese Taipei	3	1	2	10	15	.333	2	3rd Place Match
4	Australia	3	1	2	13	29	.333	2	3rd Place Match

Source: APBC
(H) Hosts

== Summary ==
Date	Local time	Road team	Score	Home team	Inn.	Venue	Game duration	Attendance	Boxscore
Sep 12, 2026	12:00 JST	Australia	8–7	South Korea		Tokyo Dome	3:37	4,273	Boxscore
Sep 12, 2026	19:00 JST	Japan	5–0	Chinese Taipei		Tokyo Dome	2:26	26,210	Boxscore
Sep 13, 2026	12:00 JST	Chinese Taipei	6–4	Australia		Tokyo Dome	3:23	4,527	Boxscore
Sep 13, 2026	19:00 JST	South Korea	5–9	Japan		Tokyo Dome	3:22	38,385	Boxscore
Sep 14, 2026	12:00 JST	Japan	16–1	Australia	7	Tokyo Dome	2:37	33,711	Boxscore
Sep 14, 2026	19:00 JST	Chinese Taipei	4–6	South Korea		Tokyo Dome	2:54	10,772	Boxscore

== Games ==
=== Australia vs. South Korea ===
November 12, 2026 12:00 PM JST at Tokyo Dome in Tokyo, Japan
Team	1	2	3	4	5	6	7	8	9	R	H	E
Australia	3	0	1	0	0	0	0	2	2	8	10	1
South Korea	0	0	0	0	0	6	0	0	1	7	7	1
WP: Kieren Hall (1–0) LP: Choi Jun-yong (0–1); Home runs: AUS: Blake Cavill (1), Clayton Campbell (1); KOR: Kim Ju-won (1); Attendance: 4,273; Umpires: Shinya Nagakawa, Chi Hua-wen, Takuya Mizuguchi, Chu Qingyan; Boxscore

=== Japan vs. Chinese Taipei ===
November 12, 2026 19:00 PM JST at Tokyo Dome in Tokyo, Japan
Team	1	2	3	4	5	6	7	8	9	R	H	E
Japan	2	0	1	0	0	0	1	0	1	5	11	0
Chinese Taipei	0	0	0	0	0	0	0	0	0	0	2	1
WP: Yumeto Kanemaru (1–0) LP: Lin Tzu-wei (0–1); Home runs: JPN: Tomoya Masaki (2), Rui Muneyama (1); TPE: None; Attendance: 26,210; Umpires: Yun Tae-su, Brett Robson, Bae Byeong-du, Trent Thomas; Boxscore

=== Chinese Taipei vs. Australia ===
November 13, 2026 12:00 PM JST at Tokyo Dome in Tokyo, Japan
Team	1	2	3	4	5	6	7	8	9	R	H	E
Chinese Taipei	2	1	0	0	1	0	1	1	0	6	7	2
Australia	4	0	0	0	0	0	0	0	0	4	6	2
WP: Chang Cheng-en (1–0) LP: Cooper Morgan (0–1) Sv: Chung Yun-hua (1); Home runs: TPE: Chang Jen-wei (1); AUS: None; Attendance: 4,527; Umpires: Bae Byeong-du , Mizuguchi Takuya, Yun Tae-su , Nakagawa Shinya; Boxscore

=== South Korea vs. Japan ===
November 13, 2026 19:00 PM JST at Tokyo Dome in Tokyo, Japan
Team	1	2	3	4	5	6	7	8	9	R	H	E
South Korea	0	0	1	0	0	0	0	4	0	5	7	0
Japan	0	0	2	0	0	1	2	4	x	9	10	0
WP: Shunya Morita (1–0) LP: Kim Young-woo (0–1); Home runs: KOR: Han Dong-hui (1), Kim Whee-jip (1); JPN: Tomoya Masaki (1), Taiga Kojima (1), Rui Muneyama (2); Attendance: 38,385; Umpires: Brett Robson, Chu Qingyan, Trent Thomas, Chi Huawen; Boxscore

=== Japan vs. Australia ===
November 14, 2026 12:00 PM JST at Tokyo Dome in Tokyo, Japan
Team	1	2	3	4	5	6	7	R	H	E
Japan	11	2	2	0	1	0	0	16	11	0
Australia	0	0	0	1	0	0	0	1	2	1
WP: Taka Taichi (1–0) LP: Liam Doolan (0–1); Home runs: JPN: Rui Muneyama (1), Tomoya Masaki (1), Seiya Watanabe (1); AUS: Brent Iredale (1); Attendance: 33,711; Umpires: Chu Qingyan, Bae Byeong-du, Chi Huawen, Yun Tae-su; Boxscore

=== Chinese Taipei vs. South Korea ===
November 14, 2026 19:00 PM JST at Tokyo Dome in Tokyo, Japan
Team	1	2	3	4	5	6	7	8	9	R	H	E
Chinese Taipei	0	0	0	0	3	0	1	0	0	4	4	0
South Korea	0	0	3	0	1	1	1	0	x	6	9	1
WP: Lee Ro-un (1–0) LP: Chen Mu-heng (0–1) Sv: Park Jeong-min (1); Home runs: TPE: Zeng Sheng-an (2), Chang Jen-wei (1); KOR: Park Jae-hyun (1), Kim Do-yeong (1), Moon Jeong-bin (1); Attendance: 10,772; Umpires: Takuya Mizuguchi, Trent Thomas, Shinya Nakagawa, Brett Robson; Boxscore

== Final ==
=== Australia vs. Chinese Taipei ===
November 15, 2026 11:00 AM JST at Tokyo Dome in Tokyo, Japan
Team	1	2	3	4	5	6	7	8	9	R	H	E
Australia	0	0	0	0	6	0	0	0	0	6	7	1
Chinese Taipei	0	1	0	0	3	0	0	0	0	4	7	0
WP: Ky Hampton (1–0) LP: Kao Wei-chiang (0–1) Sv: Kieren Hall (1); Attendance: 6,121; Umpires: Shinya Nakagawa, Yun Tae-su, Takuya Mizuguchi, Bae Byeong-du; Boxscore

=== South Korea vs. Japan ===
November 15, 2026 19:00 PM JST at Tokyo Dome in Tokyo, Japan
Team	1	2	3	4	5	6	7	8	9	R	H	E
South Korea	0	0	0	0	0	0	1	0	0	1	5	2
Japan	1	0	1	0	3	0	0	0	x	5	10	0
WP: Hiroto Takahashi (1–0) LP: Kim Keon-woo (0–1); Home runs: KOR: None; JPN: Micho Nishikawa (1), Tomoya Masaki (1); Attendance: 36,022; Umpires: Brett Robson, Chu Qingyan, Trent Thomas, Chi Huawen; Boxscore

== Final standings ==
Rk	Team	W	L	R	RA
1	Japan	4	0	35	7
2	South Korea	1	3	19	26
3	Australia	2	2	19	33
4	Chinese Taipei	1	3	14	21

APBC 2026

Japan
Third title

== Awards ==
The APBC 2026 organization announced MVP as follows.

MVP
Award	Player
MVP	(Japan) Rui Muneyama
