= 2025 Badminton Asia Junior Championships – Boys' doubles =

Tournament details
- Dates: 23 – 27 July 2025
- Edition: 25th
- Level: International
- Nations: 19
- Venue: Manahan Indoor Sports Hall
- Location: Surakarta, Central Java, Indonesia

The boys' doubles tournament of the 2025 Badminton Asia Junior Championships was held from 23 to 27 July. Lin Xiangyi and Hu Keyuan from China clinched this title in the last edition in 2024.

== Seeds ==
Seeds were announced on 24 June. Click on the seed number of a player to go to their draw section.

1. (India) Bhargav Ram Arigela / Viswa Tej Gobburu (third round)
2. (China) Chen Junting / Liu Junrong (champion)
3. (Thailand) Krith Praphasiri / Tanatphong Tiansirilert (second round)
4. (Malaysia) Loh Ziheng / Tan Zhi Yang (second round)
5. (Indonesia) Muhammad Vito Annafsa / Grendly Alkatib Lumintang (quarter-finals)
6. (India) Bhavya Chhabra / C Lalramsanga (withdrew)
7. (South Korea) Cho Hyeong-woo / Lee Hyeong-woo (final)
8. (South Korea) Hyun Su-min / Kim Min-seung (quarter-finals)

== Draw ==
=== Finals ===
Quarter-finals
(China) Wen Xin (China) Zheng Weigang	21	21
5	(Indonesia) Muhammad Vito Annafsa (Indonesia) Grendly Alkatib Lumintang	14	18
(Indonesia) Faizal Pangestu (Indonesia) Anju Siahaan	12	10
7	(South Korea) Cho Hyeong-woo (South Korea) Lee Hyeong-woo	21	21
(Japan) Kazuma Kawano (Japan) Shuji Sawada	21	21
(China) Feng Yilang (China) Tu Yichen	16	19
8	(South Korea) Hyun Su-min (South Korea) Kim Min-seung	22	20	9
2	(China) Chen Junting (China) Liu Junrong	20	22	21

Semi-finals
(China) Wen Xin (China) Zheng Weigang	15	21	13
7	(South Korea) Cho Hyeong-woo (South Korea) Lee Hyeong-woo	21	17	21
(Japan) Kazuma Kawano (Japan) Shuji Sawada	15	16
2	(China) Chen Junting (China) Liu Junrong	21	21

Final
7	(South Korea) Cho Hyeong-woo (South Korea) Lee Hyeong-woo	11	12
2	(China) Chen Junting (China) Liu Junrong	21	21

=== Top half ===
==== Section 1 ====
First round
(Vietnam) Le M S (Vietnam) Nguyen T D L	15	10
(Japan) H Masuda (Japan) S Miyashita	21	21
(Singapore) Tan W D (Singapore) Tan X D E	11	11
(China) Wen X (China) Zheng WG	21	21

Second round
1	(India) B R Arigela (India) V T Gobburu	21	21
(Japan) H Masuda (Japan) S Miyashita	15	15
(Macau) Chio C S (Macau) Ou K H	7	10
(China) Wen X (China) Zheng WG	21	21

Third round
1	(India) B R Arigela (India) V T Gobburu	19	16
(China) Wen X (China) Zheng WG	21	21

==== Section 2 ====
First round
(South Korea) Jeong D-h (South Korea) Kim T-h	21	21
(Sri Lanka) N Munasinghe (Sri Lanka) M T Wijegunawardana	8	10
(Chinese Taipei) Hung B-f (Chinese Taipei) Li M-c	21	21
(Myanmar) Y L Htet (Myanmar) Y N Tun	7	7
(Thailand) T Jintamuttha (Thailand) A Sreepeaw	19	21	21
(Malaysia) U Ameer (Malaysia) K Z Pang	21	18	16

Second round
5	(Indonesia) M V Annafsa (Indonesia) G A Lumintang	21	21
(South Korea) Jeong D-h (South Korea) Kim T-h	16	16
(Chinese Taipei) Hung B-f (Chinese Taipei) Li M-c	17	21	21
(Thailand) T Jintamuttha (Thailand) A Sreepeaw	21	19	13

Third round
5	(Indonesia) M V Annafsa (Indonesia) G A Lumintang	21	17	21
(Chinese Taipei) Hung B-f (Chinese Taipei) Li M-c	18	21	13

==== Section 3 ====
First round
(Malaysia) D A I Datu Asrah (Malaysia) D Ling	20	19
(Hong Kong) Cheung S S (Hong Kong) Deng C F	22	21
(Chinese Taipei) Chou Y-h (Chinese Taipei) Hsu C-j	13	21	22
(Indonesia) F Pangestu (Indonesia) A Siahaan	21	13	24

Second round
3	(Thailand) K Praphasiri (Thailand) T Tiansirilert	22	17	9
(Hong Kong) Cheung S S (Hong Kong) Deng C F	20	21	21
(Philippines) L C Javier (Philippines) R M Ramos	11	14
(Indonesia) F Pangestu (Indonesia) A Siahaan	21	21

Third round
(Hong Kong) Cheung S S (Hong Kong) Deng C F	18	21	9
(Indonesia) F Pangestu (Indonesia) A Siahaan	21	15	21

==== Section 4 ====
First round
(Myanmar) M M Moe (Myanmar) K K Zaw	11	12
(Sri Lanka) P Attanayake (Sri Lanka) Y Weragoda	21	21
(China) Wei JZ (China) Xue ZY	21	21
(Vietnam) Hoang A M (Vietnam) Le D C	19	19
(Japan) S Nemoto (Japan) N Yoshitsugu	17	13
(Indonesia) M R Mubarrok (Indonesia) R D E Pramono	21	21

Second round
7	(South Korea) Cho H-w (South Korea) Lee H-w	21	21
(Sri Lanka) P Attanayake (Sri Lanka) Y Weragoda	8	5
(China) Wei JZ (China) Xue ZY	15	15
(Indonesia) M R Mubarrok (Indonesia) R D E Pramono	21	21

Third round
7	(South Korea) Cho H-w (South Korea) Lee H-w	21	23
(Indonesia) M R Mubarrok (Indonesia) R D E Pramono	11	21

=== Bottom half ===
==== Section 5 ====
First round
(Japan) K Kawano (Japan) S Sawada	21	21
(Hong Kong) Cheng Y K (Hong Kong) Chung C C	13	12
(Chinese Taipei) Huang T-y (Chinese Taipei) Lin P-y	21	21
(Thailand) W Saengvanich (Thailand) T Sanitpong	9	16
(Singapore) Ng M Z (Singapore) Tan J H	17	16
(South Korea) Bak H (South Korea) Na S-j	21	21

Second round
(Japan) K Kawano (Japan) S Sawada	21	21
(Chinese Taipei) Huang T-y (Chinese Taipei) Lin P-y	9	16
(South Korea) Bak H (South Korea) Na S-j	w	/	o
6	(India) B Chhabra (India) C Lalramsanga

Third round
(Japan) K Kawano (Japan) S Sawada	21	21
(South Korea) Bak H (South Korea) Na S-j	14	17

==== Section 6 ====
First round
(Sri Lanka) T Ganewatta (Sri Lanka) J Sethuhewa	14	4
(China) Feng YL (China) Tu YC	21	21
(Philippines) J V Lanuza (Philippines) R Mendoza	11	12
(Indonesia) A O Subagio (Indonesia) A E K Tangka	21	21

Second round
(China) Feng YL (China) Tu YC	21	21
(Vietnam) Dang K D K (Vietnam) Nguyen V Q H	17	13
(Indonesia) A O Subagio (Indonesia) A E K Tangka	14	21	21
4	(Malaysia) Loh Z H (Malaysia) Tan Z Y	21	19	16

Third round
(China) Feng YL (China) Tu YC	22	21
(Indonesia) A O Subagio (Indonesia) A E K Tangka	20	19

==== Section 7 ====
First round
(Macau) Kou S I (Macau) Wong P K	17	13
(Vietnam) Hoang T D (Vietnam) Nguyen Q B	21	21
(Myanmar) N M Htet (Myanmar) P H Zaw	21	21
(Kazakhstan) T Burkhanov (Kazakhstan) A Tapishev	10	10
(Malaysia) I M Shazmir (Malaysia) A Redzuan	24	9	13
(Indonesia) R Harianto (Indonesia) A Nurrahman	22	21	21

Second round
(Vietnam) Hoang T D (Vietnam) Nguyen Q B	21	17	18
(Myanmar) N M Htet (Myanmar) P H Zaw	16	21	21
(Indonesia) R Harianto (Indonesia) A Nurrahman	14	21
8	(South Korea) Hyun S-m (South Korea) Kim M-s	21	23

Third round
(Myanmar) N M Htet (Myanmar) P H Zaw	1	7
8	(South Korea) Hyun S-m (South Korea) Kim M-s	21	21

==== Section 8 ====
First round
(Indonesia) I L Pramudya (Indonesia) D A Wahyudi	21	21
(Japan) S Hagiwara (Japan) M Matsumoto	15	9
(Sri Lanka) K Aruggoda (Sri Lanka) D Wimalaratne	6	11
(Chinese Taipei) Chen Y-a (Chinese Taipei) Lin Y-y	21	21

Second round
(Indonesia) I L Pramudya (Indonesia) D A Wahyudi	21	16	19
(Thailand) S Nadee (Thailand) C Piboon	12	21	21
(Chinese Taipei) Chen Y-a (Chinese Taipei) Lin Y-y	16	16
2	(China) Chen JT (China) Liu JR	21	21

Third round
(Thailand) S Nadee (Thailand) C Piboon	17	12
2	(China) Chen JT (China) Liu JR	21	21
