= Baseball at the 1998 Asian Games =

- Venue: Queen Sirikit Stadium
- Dates: 7–16 December 1998
- Nations: 6

Baseball was one of the many sports which was held at the 1998 Asian Games in Bangkok, Thailand beginning on 7 December 1998.

== Schedule ==
P	Preliminary round	½	Semifinals	F	Finals

Event↓/Date →	7th Mon	8th Tue	9th Wed	10th Thu	11th Fri	12th Sat	13th Sun	14th Mon	15th Tue	16th Wed
Men	P	P	P		P	P	P		½	F

== Medalists ==
Event	Gold	Silver	Bronze
Men	South Korea; Baek Jae-ho; Chang Young-kyoon; Cho In-sung; Choi Won-ho; Hong Sung-heon; Hwang Woo-gu; Jin Kab-yong; Kang Bong-kyu; Kang Chul-min; Kang Hyuk; Kim Byung-hyun; Kim Dong-joo; Kim Won-hyong; Kyung Hun-ho; Lee Byung-kyu; Lim Chang-yong; Park Chan-ho; Park Han-yi; Park Jae-hong; Seo Jae-weong; Shim Jae-hak; Shin Myung-chul	Japan; Shinnosuke Abe; Kokichi Akune; Mitsutaka Goto; Shoji Hirota; Tomohiro Iizuka; Yoshihiko Kajiyama; Satoshi Kashibuchi; Timmy Keenan; Masahiro Kimura; Naoki Matoba; Hitoshi Miyata; Koji Okumura; Yosuke Sunazuka; Kinji Tagashira; Hisanori Takahashi; Kenji Takahashi; Hideo Tamura; Naoyuki Tateishi; Yoshihito Uenaka; Michinao Yamamura	Chinese Taipei; Chang Tai-shan; Chen Chih-yuan; Chen Chin-feng; Cheng Chang-ming; Chuan Chin-her; Chueh Chuang-chen; Feng Sheng-hsien; Hsu Ming-chieh; Huang Chiung-lung; Huang Chung-yi; Kuo Lee Chien-fu; Lin Kun-han; Liu Yi-chuan; Pan Chung-wei; Shen Po-tsang; Tsai Wei-ting; Tsao Chun-yang; Tseng Chih-chen; Wang Kuang-huei; Wu Chao-hui; Wu Chun-liang; Yang Sung-hsien

== Results ==
=== Preliminary round ===
==== Level A ====
Pos	Team	Pld	W	L	RF	RA	PCT	GB	Qualification
1	South Korea	4	4	0	43	19	1.000	—	Semifinals
2	Japan	4	1	3	24	34	.250 (Note: Head-to-head result: JPN 14–12 TPE.)	3	Semifinals
3	Chinese Taipei	4	1	3	21	35	.250	3	Semifinals

Source: Results
Notes:

7 December	South Korea	16–5 (F/7)	Chinese Taipei	Queen Sirikit Stadium, Pathum Thani

8 December	Chinese Taipei	1–4	Japan	Queen Sirikit Stadium, Pathum Thani

9 December	Japan	8–13	South Korea	Queen Sirikit Stadium, Pathum Thani

11 December	Chinese Taipei	4–5	South Korea	Queen Sirikit Stadium, Pathum Thani

12 December	Japan	10–11	Chinese Taipei	Queen Sirikit Stadium, Pathum Thani

13 December	South Korea	9–2	Japan	Queen Sirikit Stadium, Pathum Thani

==== Level B ====
Pos	Team	Pld	W	L	RF	RA	PCT	GB	Qualification
1	China	4	4	0	65	16	1.000	—	Semifinals
2	Philippines	4	1	3	28	39	.250 (Note: Head-to-head result: PHI 20–11 THA.)	3	
3	Thailand	4	1	3	19	57	.250	3	

Source: Results
Notes:

7 December	Thailand	6–5	Philippines	Queen Sirikit Stadium, Pathum Thani

8 December	Philippines	7–17	China	Queen Sirikit Stadium, Pathum Thani

9 December	China	24–5	Thailand	Queen Sirikit Stadium, Pathum Thani

11 December	Philippines	15–5	Thailand	Queen Sirikit Stadium, Pathum Thani

12 December	China	11–1	Philippines	Queen Sirikit Stadium, Pathum Thani

13 December	Thailand	3–13	China	Queen Sirikit Stadium, Pathum Thani

=== Final round ===
Semifinals
15 December
South Korea	9
China	2
15 December
Japan	9
Chinese Taipei	8

Final
16 December
South Korea (F/7)	13
Japan	1
Bronze medal game
16 December
China	6
Chinese Taipei	10

==== Semifinals ====
15 December	South Korea	9–2	China	Queen Sirikit Stadium, Pathum Thani

15 December	Japan	9–8	Chinese Taipei	Queen Sirikit Stadium, Pathum Thani

==== Bronze medal game ====
16 December	Chinese Taipei	10–6	China	Queen Sirikit Stadium, Pathum Thani

==== Final ====
16 December	South Korea	13–1 (F/7)	Japan	Queen Sirikit Stadium, Pathum Thani

Team	1	2	3	4	5	6	7	8	9	R
Japan	1	0	0	0	0	0	0	—	—	1
South Korea	2	4	3	0	4	0	X	—	—	13

== Final standing ==
Rank	Team	Pld	W	L
1st place, gold medalist(s)	South Korea	6	6	0
2nd place, silver medalist(s)	Japan	6	2	4
3rd place, bronze medalist(s)	Chinese Taipei	6	2	4
4	China	6	4	2
5	Philippines	4	1	3
6	Thailand	4	1	3
