= Toyohashi Municipal Baseball Stadium =

Baseball venues in Toyohashi , Aichi, Japan

- 豊橋市民球場

- Location within Aichi Prefecture Location within Japan
- Location: Iwata Sports Park, Toyohashi, Aichi, Japan
- Coordinates: 34°45′26.17″N 137°25′30.17″E
- Owner: Toyohashi
- Capacity: 15,895

Construction
- Opened: 1980

Toyohashi Municipal Baseball Stadium (豊橋市民球場), is a baseball stadium in Toyohashi, Aichi Prefecture, Japan. It opened in 1980.

This stadium was used as the venue for baseball at the 2026 Asian Games.
