= Chang Shr-lun =

Taiwanese baseball player (born 2005

CTBC Brothers – No. 4
- Infielder
- Born: March 16, 2005 (age 21); Kaohsiung, Taiwan
- Bats: Left Throws: Right

CPBL debut
- June 26, 2024, for the CTBC Brothers

CPBL statistics (through October 7, 2026)
- Batting average: .319
- Hits: 101
- Home runs: 2
- Runs batted in: 40
- Stats at Baseball Reference

Teams
- CTBC Brothers (2023–present)

Career highlights and awards
- Taiwan Series champion (2024); All-Star (2026); CPBL Batter of the Month (2026/08)

Chang Shr-lun (Chinese: 張士綸; pinyin: Zhāng Shì Lún; born March 16, 2005) is a Taiwanese professional baseball infielder for the CTBC Brothers of the Chinese Professional Baseball League (CPBL).

== Early life ==
Chang was born in Kaohsiung, Taiwan, on March 16, 2025. He is the youngest brother of Chang Cheng-yu, who is also a professional baseball infielder for the Wei Chuan Dragons of the CPBL.

== Career ==
=== CTBC Brothers ===
Chang was selected by the CTBC Brothers as their 3rd pick in the 2023 Chinese Professional Baseball League draft. He received a signing bonus of NT$2.8 million and a monthly salary of NT$60,000, along with an additional NT$800,000 in incentive bonuses.

He made his professional debut on 26 June 2024, entering as a substitute in a game against the Rakuten Monkeys at the Taichung Intercontinental Baseball Stadium. He recorded a sacrifice bunt in his debut appearance.

On 9 October 2024, Chang hit a triple in the top of the seventh inning against the Rakuten Monkeys at Rakuten Taoyuan Baseball Stadium, driving in a run to record the first hit and first RBI of his professional career.

On 16 March 2025, during a spring training game against the Uni-President 7-Eleven Lions at Taichung Intercontinental Baseball Stadium, Chang hit a solo home run in the sixth inning, becoming the first player to hit a home run in a spring training game on his birthday. He also became the first player in CPBL history to hit a birthday home run during a spring training game.

He hit his first home run on 2 July 2026, against the Rakuten Monkeys at the Taichung Intercontinental Baseball Stadium.

== International career ==
Chang was part of the roster for the 2026 Asia Professional Baseball Championship.
