= Okazaki Municipal Baseball Stadium =

Baseball venues in Okazaki, Aichi, Japan

- 岡崎市民球場

- Location within Aichi Prefecture Location within Japan
- Location: Okazaki Central General Park, Okazaki, Aichi, Japan
- Coordinates: 34°56′50.58″N 137°12′50.46″E
- Owner: Okazaki, Aichi
- Capacity: 20,000

Construction
- Opened: June 1, 1991

Okazaki Municipal Baseball Stadium (岡崎市民球場), also known as Okazaki Red Diamond Stadium (岡崎レッドダイヤモンドスタジアム), is a baseball stadium in Okazaki, Aichi Prefecture, Japan.

This stadium was used as the venue for baseball at the 2026 Asian Games.
