= Yoon Dong-hee =

South Korean baseball player (born 2003)

Lotte Giants – No. 91
- Right fielder
- Born: September 18, 2003 (age 23); Goyang, South Korea
- Bats: Right Throws: Right

KBO debut
- May 31, 2022, for the Lotte Giants

KBO statistics (through 2026)
- Batting average: .241
- Home runs: 5
- Runs batted in: 60
- Stats at Baseball Reference

Teams
- Lotte Giants (2022–present)
Medals
Men's baseball
Representing South Korea
Asian Games
Gold medal – first place	2022 Hangzhou	Team
Gold medal – first place	2026 Aichi–Nagoya	Team
U-23 Baseball World Cup
Silver medal – second place	2022 Taiwan	Team

Yoon Dong-hee (Korean: 윤동희; born September 8, 2003) is a South Korean professional baseball player for the Lotte Giants of the KBO League. He competed for the South Korean national baseball team at the 2022 and 2026 Asian Games, winning gold medals.
