= Kang Bong-kyu =

South Korean baseball player (born 1978)

Kang Bong-Kyu
- Outfielder
- Born: January 12, 1978 (age 48)
- Bats: Right Throws: Right

KBO debut
- 2000, for the Doosan Bears

KBO statistics (through 2011)
- Batting average: .267
- Home runs: 43
- RBI: 219

Teams
- Doosan Bears (2000–2005); Samsung Lions (2006–2015)
Medals
Men's baseball
Asian Games
Gold medal – first place	1998 Bangkok	Team

Kang Bong-Kyu (Korean: 강봉규; Hanja: 康奉珪; born January 12, 1978, in Busan, South Korea) is an outfielder who played for the Samsung Lions in the Korea Baseball Organization. He bats and throws right-handed. From 2017, he is the batting coach for the Samsung Lions

== Amateur career ==
While attending Kyungnam High School, Kang was considered one of the best hitting pitchers in the Korean high school baseball league. As an ace pitcher and cleanup hitter in Kyungnam High School, he led his team to runners-up at the Golden Lion Flag national championship in 1994 and the Hwarang Flag national championship in 1995. In September 1995, Kang was selected for the South Korea national junior baseball team to compete at the 3-Nation Junior Baseball Championship in Seoul, South Korea, along with Kim Sun-Woo, Seo Jae-Weong and Park Jin-Man.

Upon graduation from high school in 1996, Kang chose to play college baseball at Korea University instead of turning pro directly and completely quit pitching to focus on hitting. However, in August 1996 he was called up to the South Korea national junior baseball team again as a pitcher for the World Junior Baseball Championship held in Sancti Spiritus, Cuba.

In July 1997, as a sophomore at Korea University, Kang got his first call-up to the South Korea national baseball team for the team's five annual friendly matches against the USA national baseball team in California, United States.

In July 1998, as a junior, Kang was selected as a member of the South Korea national baseball team and led his team to runner-up at the 1998 Baseball World Cup as a starting third baseman.

In December 1998, as an amateur player, Kang was selected for the South Korea national team that won the gold medal in the baseball tournament of the 1998 Asian Games in Bangkok, Thailand. In the tourney, he served as a backup to KBO star Kim Dong-Joo at third base.

=== Notable international careers ===
Year	Venue	Competition	Team	Individual note
1996	Cuba	World Junior Baseball Championship	4th	
1998	Italy	Baseball World Cup	Silver medal	
1998	Thailand	Asian Games	Gold medal	.250 BA (1-for-4)

== Professional career ==
Kang was signed by the Doosan Bears in 2000, playing mostly as a backup outfielder against left-handed pitchers. He was traded to the Samsung Lions in 2006 with Kim Chang-Hee in exchange for Kang Dong-Woo. Over his career in the Bears Kang compiled a .240 batting average and 10 home runs.

=== 2009 ===
In 2009, Kang had the most brilliant season in his pro career. He played in 126 games, batted .310 with 20 home runs, 139 hits and 78 RBI, and posted career-highs in all the offensive categories, finishing in the top 10 of the league in 4 different offensive categories (sixth in runs and tenth in batting, on-base percentage and slugging percentage).

On September 25, Kang stole his 20th bases of the season in the first inning of Lions' final game of the 2009 season against Hanhwa Eagles to become a member of the 20-20 club.

Kang was selected as Samsung Lions' MVP of the year.

On December 11, 2009, at the 2009 Golden Gloves Award Ceremony, Kang was awarded "The Fair Play Trophy" and "Most Improved Player" by the KBO.

=== 2010 ===
Kang was selected as captain of Samsung Lions.

=== 2011 ===
On Oct. 31, 2011 in 5th game of 2011 Korean Series against SK Wyverns, Kang hit a solo home run to lead Samsung Lions to Korean Series Championship and was awarded the MVP of Game 5.
