= Gwak Been =

South Korean baseball player (born 1999)

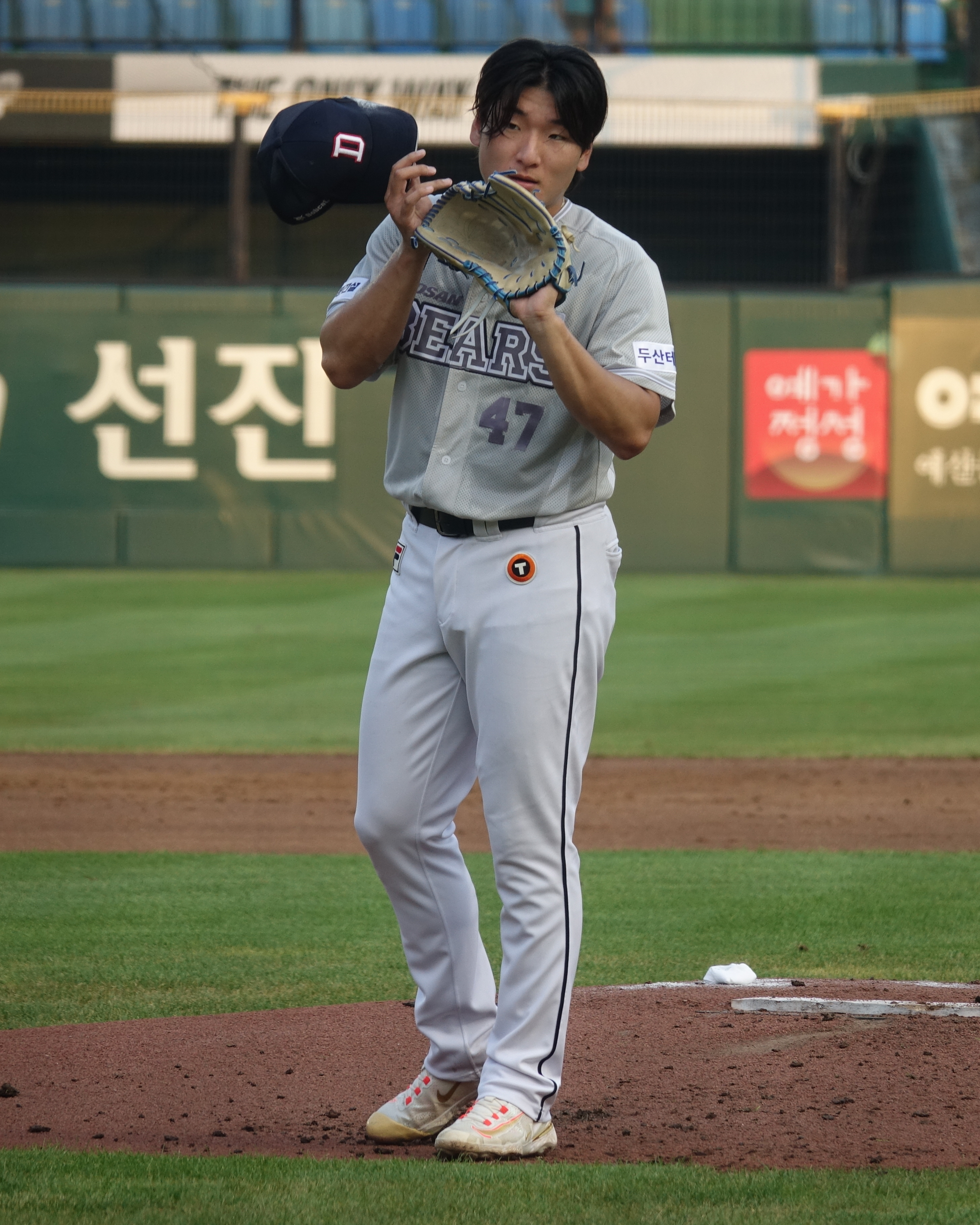

Doosan Bears – No. 47
- Pitcher
- Born: May 28, 1999 (age 27); Seoul, South Korea
- Bats: Right Throws: Right

KBO debut
- March 24, 2018, for the Doosan Bears

KBO statistics (through 2026 season)
- Win–loss record: 58–47
- Earned run average: 3.67
- Strikeouts: 824
- Stats at Baseball Reference

Teams
- Doosan Bears (2018–present)

Career highlights and awards
- KBO Award - Win Award (2024); Choi Dong-won Award (2026); 2× KBO All-Star (2024, 2026); KBO double leader (2026); KBO Defensive Award (2026)
Medals
Men's baseball
Representing South Korea
Asian Games
Gold medal – first place	2022 Hangzhou	Team
Gold medal – first place	2026 Aichi-Nagoya	Team
U-18 Baseball World Cup
Silver medal – second place	2017 Thunder Bay	Team

Gwak Been (Korean: 곽빈; born May 28, 1999) is a South Korean professional baseball pitcher for the Doosan Bears of the KBO League. He graduated from Baemyung High School and was selected by the Bears as the first pick in the 2018 draft.

== Career ==
Gwak made 23 starts for Doosan in 2023, compiling a 12-7 record and 2.90 ERA with 106 strikeouts across 127 1/3 innings pitched.
