= Yūya Shintō =

Japanese baseball player (born 2002)

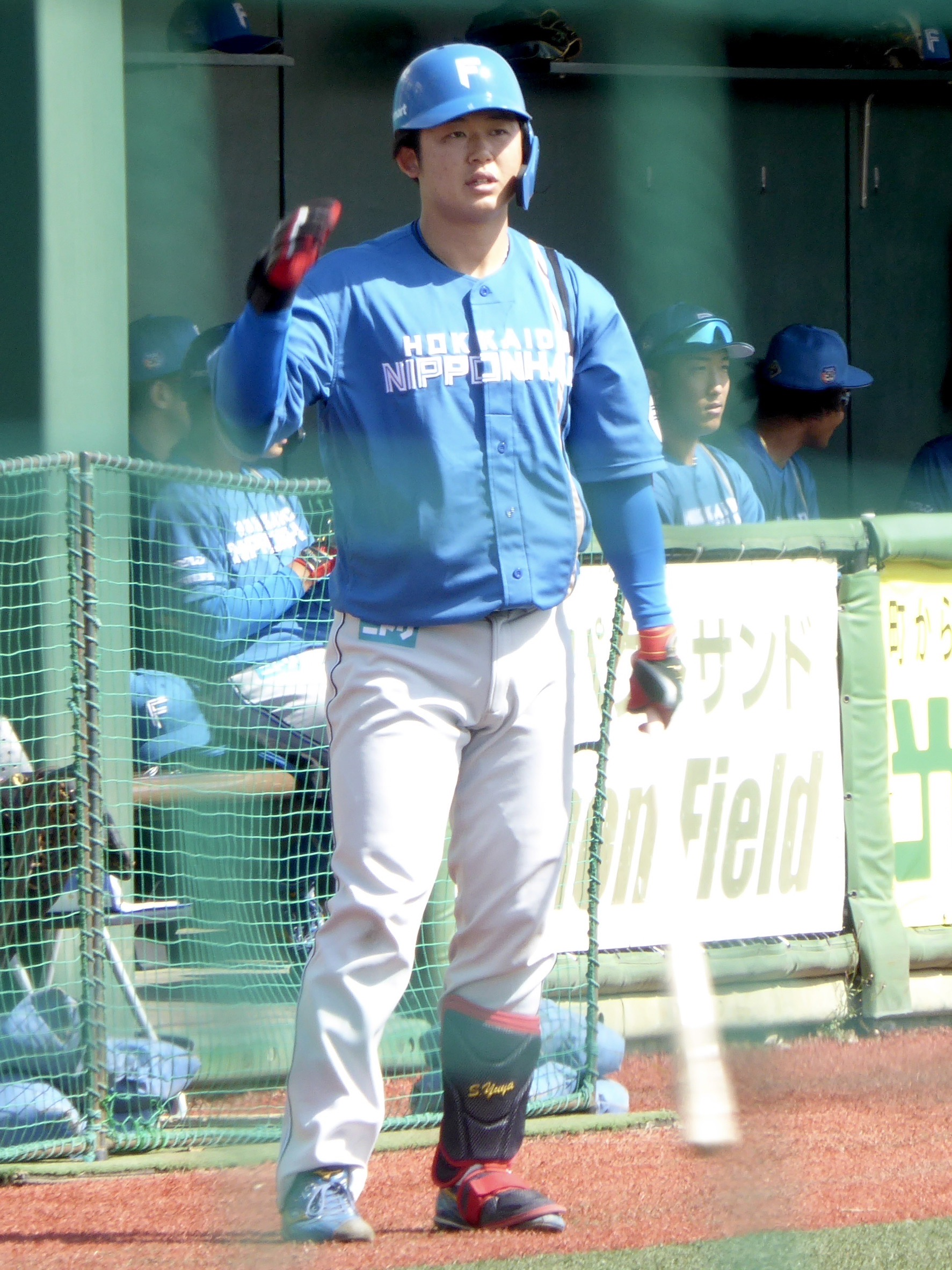

Hokkaido Nippon-Ham Fighters – No. 33
- Catcher
- Born: March 10, 2002 (age 24); Fukuoka, Fukuoka, Japan
- Bats: Right Throws: Right

NPB debut
- June 18, 2024, for the Hokkaido Nippon-Ham Fighters

NPB statistics (through 2025 season)
- Batting average: .069
- Hits: 2
- Home runs: 0
- Runs batted in: 0
- Stolen base: 0

Teams
- Hokkaido Nippon-Ham Fighters (2024–present)

Yūya Shintō (進藤 勇也, Shintō Yūya; born March 10, 2002) is a Japanese professional baseball catcher for the Hokkaido Nippon-Ham Fighters in Nippon Professional Baseball.
