= Shin Myung-chul =

South Korean baseball player

KT Wiz – No. 91
- Second baseman
- Born: August 6, 1978 (age 47)
- Bats: Right Throws: Right

KBO debut
- 2001, for the Lotte Giants

KBO statistics (through 2013)
- Batting average: .242
- Home runs: 52
- RBI: 316
- Stats at Baseball Reference

Teams
- Player Career: Lotte Giants (2001–2006); Samsung Lions (2007–2013); KT Wiz (2014–2015); Coach Career: KT Wiz (2015–)
Medals
Men's baseball
Representing South Korea
Asian Games
Gold medal – first place	1998 Bangkok	Team

- Shin Myung-chul
- Hangul: 신명철
- Hanja: 申命澈
- RR: Sin Myeongcheol
- MR: Sin Myŏngch'ŏl

Shin Myung-chul (Korean: 신명철; Hanja: 申命澈; born August 6, 1978, in Masan, South Korea) is a second baseman who plays for the KT Wiz in the Korea Baseball Organization. He bats and throws right-handed.

== Amateur career ==
Upon graduation from high school in 1997, he chose to play college baseball at Yonsei University instead of turning pro directly. In July 1997, as a freshman Shin was selected to play for South Korea in the 8th Korea–USA College Baseball Championship Series. Team Korea eventually had a record of 2–3 and Shin played in all five games as a starting second baseman.

In April 1998, Yonsei University captured the 32nd President's Flag College Championship, and Shin dominated the competition by winning the batting and stolen base titles and earning the MVP honors. Shin spent much of the summer of 1998 overseas with the South Korean national team, taking part in a tour of Japan and United States and competing in the Baseball World Cup held in Italy. In December 1998, he was selected for the South Korea national team again that finished in 1st place at the 1998 Asian Games in Bangkok, Thailand.

=== Notable international careers ===
Year	Venue	Competition	Team	Individual note
1998	Italy	Baseball World Cup	Silver medal	
1998	Thailand	Asian Games	Gold medal	.368 BA, 1 HR
1999	South Korea	Asian Baseball Championship	Gold medal	
1999	Australia	Intercontinental Cup	7th	

== Professional career ==
Shin started his professional career in Lotte Giants in 2001, but was traded to Samsung Lions in 2007.

In the 2009 season, Shin currently has a .293 batting average with 120 hits.

He joined the 20–20 club with 20 home runs and 21 stolen bases in 2009 with a 2-run on September 23, 2009, against SK Wyverns.
