= Jeong Jun-jae =

South Korean baseball player

SSG Landers – No. 3
- Second baseman
- Born: January 3, 2003 (age 23); Incheon, South Korea
- Bats: Left Throws: Right

KBO debut
- May 3, 2024, for the SSG Landers

KBO statistics (through 2026)
- Batting average: .271
- Home runs: 1
- Runs batted in: 124
- Stats at Baseball Reference

Teams
- SSG Landers (2024–present)

Career highlights and awards
- KBO Defensive Award (2026)
Medals
Men's baseball
Representing South Korea
Asian Games
| Gold medal – first place | 2026 Aichi–Nagoya | Team |
Asia Baseball Championship
| Bronze medal – third place | 2023 Taipei | Team |

Jeong Jun-jae (Korean: 정준재; born January 3, 2003) is a South Korean professional baseball player for the Doosan Bears of the SSG Landers. He appeared in six baseball contests during the 2026 Asian Games, and won a gold medal for South Korea.
