= Choi Min-seok =

South Korean baseball player (born 2006)

Doosan Bears – No. 68
- Pitcher
- Born: July 2, 2006 (age 20); Seoul, South Korea
- Bats: Right Throws: Right

KBO debut
- May 21, 2025, for the Doosan Bears

KBO statistics (through 2026)
- Win–loss record: 14–4
- Earned run average: 2.73
- Strikeouts: 121

Teams
- Doosan Bears (2025–present)
Medals
Men's baseball
Representing South Korea
Asian Games
| Gold medal – first place | 2026 Aichi–Nagoya | Team |

Choi Min-seok (Korean: 최민석; born July 2, 2006) is a South Korean professional baseball pitcher for the Doosan Bears of the KBO League. He appeared in two baseball contests during the 2026 Asian Games, and won a gold medal for South Korea.
