= Sung Yeong-tak =

South Korean baseball player (born 2004)

Kia Tigers – No. 65
- Pitcher
- Born: July 28, 2004 (age 22); Busan, South Korea
- Bats: Left Throws: Left

KBO debut
- May 20, 2025, for the Kia Tigers

KBO statistics (through 2025)
- Win–loss record: 3–1
- Earned run average: 2.96
- Strikeouts: 39
- Stats at Baseball Reference

Teams
- Kia Tigers (2025–present)
Medals
Men's baseball
Representing South Korea
Asian Games
Gold medal – first place	2026 Aichi–Nagoya	Team

Bae Chan-seung (Korean: 성영탁; born July 28, 2004) is a South Korean professional baseball pitcher for the Kia Tigers of the KBO League. He appeared in two baseball contests during the 2026 Asian Games, and won a gold medal for South Korea.
