= Bae Chan-seung =

South Korean baseball player (born 2006)

Samsung Lions – No. 55
- Pitcher
- Born: January 1, 2006 (age 20); Gyeonggi Province, South Korea
- Bats: Left Throws: Left

KBO debut
- March 23, 2025, for the Samsung Lions

KBO statistics (through 2025)
- Win–loss record: 4–2
- Earned run average: 2.58
- Strikeouts: 33
- Stats at Baseball Reference

Teams
- Samsung Lions (2025–present)

Career highlights and awards
- Korean Series champion (2026)
Medals
Men's baseball
Representing South Korea
Asian Games
Gold medal – first place	2026 Aichi–Nagoya	Team

Bae Chan-seung (Korean: 배찬승; born January 1, 2006) is a South Korean professional baseball pitcher for the Samsung Lions of the KBO League. He appeared in two baseball contests during the 2026 Asian Games, and won a gold medal for South Korea.
