= Park Jun-soon =

South Korean baseball player (born 2006)

Doosan Bears – No. 52
- Infielder
- Born: July 13, 2006 (age 20); Seoul, South Korea
- Bats: Right Throws: Right

KBO debut
- April 23, 2025, for the Doosan Bears

KBO statistics (through 2026)
- Batting average: .299
- Home runs: 16
- Runs batted in: 107

Teams
- Doosan Bears (2025–present)
Medals
Men's baseball
Representing South Korea
Asian Games
Gold medal – first place	2026 Aichi–Nagoya	Team

Park Jun-soon (Korean: 박준순; born July 13, 2006) is a South Korean professional baseball player for the Doosan Bears of the KBO League. He appeared in six baseball contests during the 2026 Asian Games, and won a gold medal for South Korea.
