= Wang Yan-cheng =

Taiwanese baseball player (born 2001)

Wang Yan-Cheng
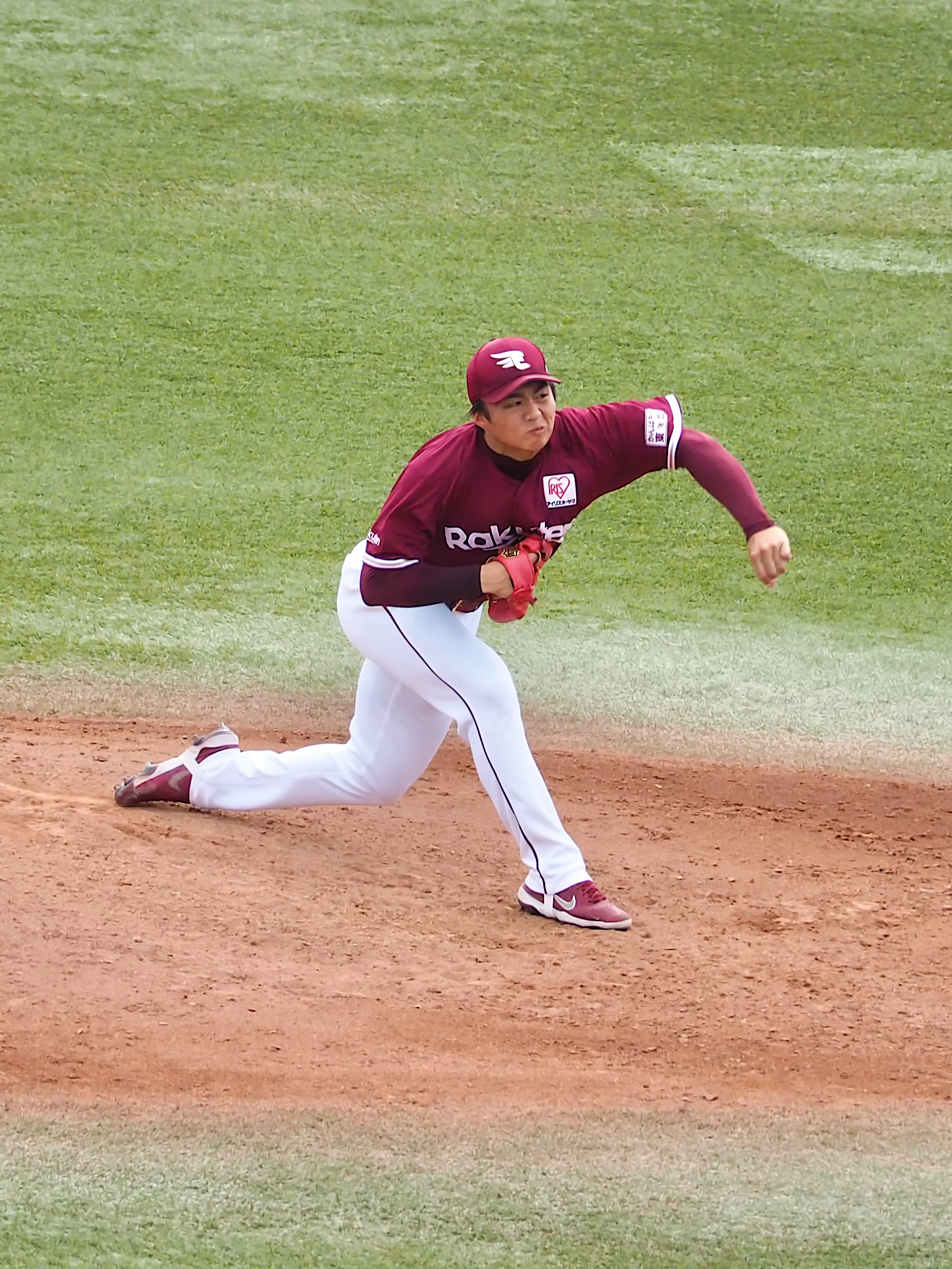
- Wang pitching for the Tohoku Rakuten Golden Eagles' farm team in 2021

Hanwha Eagles – No. 19
- Pitcher
- Born: February 14, 2001 (age 25); Hualien County, Taiwan
- Bats: Left Throws: Left

KBO debut
- March 29, 2026, for the Hanwha Eagles

KBO statistics (through August 18, 2026)
- Win–loss record: 10-5
- Earned run average: 3.52
- Strikeouts: 95
- Stats at Baseball Reference

Teams
- Tohoku Rakuten Golden Eagles (2020–2025); Hanwha Eagles (2026–present)
Medals
Men's baseball
Representing Chinese Taipei
Asian Games
Silver medal – second place	2022 Hangzhou	Team
Bronze medal – third place	2026 Aichi-Nagoya	Team

Wang Yan-Cheng (Chinese: 王彥程; born February 14, 2001) is a Taiwanese professional baseball pitcher for the Hanwha Eagles of the KBO League.

== Career ==
=== Tohoku Rakuten Golden Eagles ===
On August 20, 2019, Wang signed with the Tohoku Rakuten Golden Eagles of Nippon Professional Baseball. From 2020 to 2025, Wang made 85 appearances for Rakuten's farm team, compiling a 20–21 record and 3.62 ERA with 248 strikeouts over 343 innings of work.

=== Hanwha Eagles ===
On November 13, 2025, Wang signed a one-year, $100,000 contract with the Hanwha Eagles of the KBO League, and became the second Taiwanese player to be registered with a KBO team. He finished the season with a 3.97 ERA, a record of 11-6 and 100 strikeouts.

On October 13, 2026, Wang re-signed with the Eagles on a one-year contract.
