= Kim Geon-hee (baseball) =

South Korean baseball player (born 2004)

Kiwoom Heroes – No. 12
- Catcher
- Born: November 7, 2004 (age 21); Daejeon, South Korea
- Bats: Right Throws: Right

KBO debut
- April 4, 2023, for the Kiwoom Heros

KBO statistics (through 2026)
- Batting average: .271
- Home runs: 8
- Runs batted in: 99
- Stats at Baseball Reference

Teams
- Kiwoom Heroes (2023–present)
Medals
Men's baseball
Representing South Korea
Asian Games
Gold medal – first place	2026 Aichi–Nagoya	Team

Kim Geon-hee (Korean: 김건희; born November 7, 2004) also known as Kim Gun-hee, is a South Korean professional baseball player for the Kiwoom Heroes of the KBO League. He appeared in four baseball contests during the 2026 Asian Games, and won a gold medal for South Korea.
