= Oh Won-seok =

South Korean baseball player (born 2001)

KT Wiz – No. 47
- Pitcher
- Born: April 23, 2001 (age 25); Seongnam, South Korea
- Bats: Left Throws: Left

KBO debut
- April 19, 2020, for the SK Wyverns

Career statistics (through 2025)
- Win–loss record: 38–42
- Earned run average: 4.84
- Strikeouts: 529
- Stats at Baseball Reference

Teams
- SK Wyverns / SSG Landers (2020–2024); KT Wiz (2025–present)

Oh Won-seok (Korean: 오원석; born April 23, 2001, in Seongnam, Gyeonggi) is a South Korean pitcher for the KT Wiz in the Korea Baseball Organization (KBO).

== Amateur career ==
He played as a key player in the second grade. He started in the 73rd game against [Golden Lion] [Seongnam High School] in his third year of Yatap High School and received attention from scouts with one run and seven strikeouts.

== Professional career ==
=== 2020 season ===
Joined 2020. 2020 August 19 Hanwha Eagles He played his first game in the match, and scored one run (non-earned) in one inning in the game. Since then, he has shown considerable performance as a bullpen and has a season that has been impressive, such as receiving a chance to start against 2020 September 6 Doosan Bears.

=== 2021 season ===
At the beginning of the season, he played as a bullpen and pitched well, but joined the starting rotation due to an injury to Ati Lewiki in 2021. he performed well in the first half and played as the team's second starter and first native starter. However, in the second half of the season, he lost his physical strength and was sluggish, ranking fifth overall in the Rookie of the Year vote that year.

=== 2022 season ===
He joined the starting rotation from 2021 and started playing as a fourth starter, meeting the regulation innings for the first time in his debut. The team won the regular season title with a solid starting lineup, and then started Game 3 of the Korean Series with 5 2/35 hits, 1 walk, and 1 run, and the team won Game 3. Since then, based on Oh Won-seok's good pitching, the team has been on a roll to win the Korean Series, experiencing KBO's first wire-to-wire victory and his first individual victory.
