= Kokichi Akune =

Japanese baseball player (born 1974)

- Infielder
- Born: June 22, 1974 (age 51); Tokyo, Japan
- Bats: Left Throws: Right
- Stats at Baseball Reference

Teams
- Nippon Ham Fighters Hokkaido Nippon Ham Fighters (1999–2005)

Kokichi Akune (阿久根 鋼吉, Akune Kokichi; born June 22, 1974) is a retired Nippon Professional Baseball infielder with the Hokkaido Nippon Ham Fighters.
