= Roh Si-hwan =

South Korean baseball player (born 2000)

Hanwha Eagles – No. 8
- First baseman / Third baseman / Shortstop
- Born: December 3, 2000 (age 25); Ulsan, South Korea
- Bats: Right Throws: Right

KBO debut
- March 24, 2019, for the Hanhwa Eagles

KBO statistics (through 2025 season)
- Batting average: .264
- Home runs: 124
- Runs batted in: 490
- Stats at Baseball Reference

Teams
- Hanwha Eagles (2019–present)
Medals
Men's baseball
Representing South Korea
Asian Games
Gold medal – first place	2022 Hangzhou	Team

Roh Si-hwan (Korean: 노시환; born December 3, 2000) is a South Korean professional baseball infielder for the Hanwha Eagles of the KBO League. Roh appeared in six baseball contests during the 2022 Asian Games, and winning a gold medal for South Korea.

On November 1, 2026, the Eagles posted Roh to Major League Baseball (MLB) as a free agent.
