= Kim Jae-gul =

South Korean baseball player and coach

Kim Jae-gul 김재걸 金在杰

Hanwha Eagles – No. 82
- Third base / operation coach
- Born: September 7, 1972 (age 53); Seoul
- Batted: Right Threw: Right

KBO debut
- April 15, 1995, for the Samsung Lions

Last appearance
- 2009, for the Samsung Lions

KBO statistics
- Batting average: .230
- Home runs: 14
- Runs batted in: 170
- Stats at Baseball Reference

Teams
- As player: Samsung Lions (1995–2009); As coach: Samsung Lions (2010–2018, 2021–2023); LG Twins (2019–2020); Hanwha Eagles (2024–present)

Kim Jae-gul (born September 7, 1972) is a South Korean professional baseball coach for the Samsung Lions of the Korea Baseball Organization. He represented the South Korea national baseball team at the 1994 Asian Games and 2006 World Baseball Classic.
