= Kao Chih-kang =

Taiwanese baseball player (born 1981)

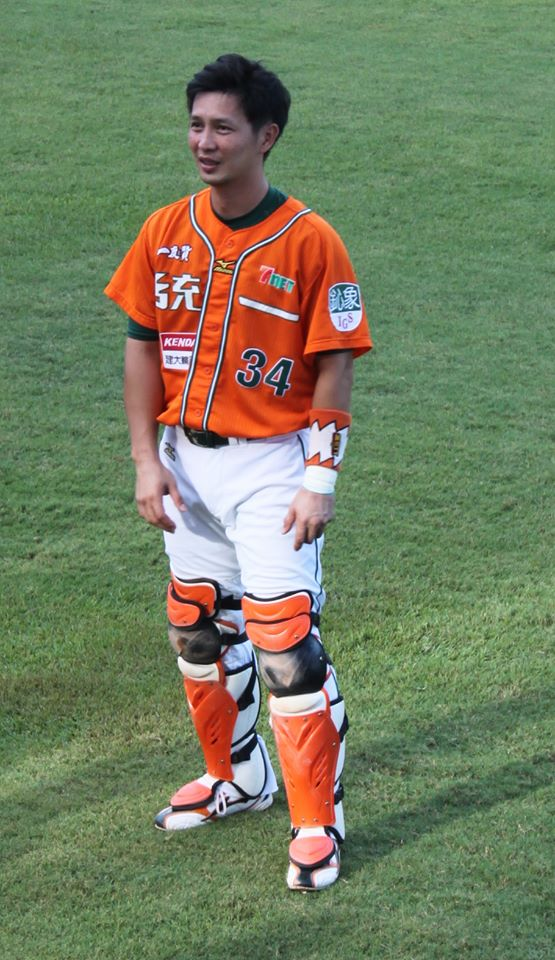

Uni-President Lions – No. 34
- Catcher / Coach
- Born: 7 February 1981 (age 45); Taoyuan, Taiwan
- Batted: Right Threw: Right

CPBL debut
- March 13, 2005, for the Uni-President Lions

Last CPBL appearance
- August 26, 2018, for the Uni-President Lions

Career statistics
- Batting average: .278
- Home runs: 21
- Runs batted in: 363
- Stolen bases: 49
- Stats at Baseball Reference

Teams
- Uni-President Lions (2005–2018)

Career highlights and awards
- CPBL Gold Glove (2009, 2010)

Medal record

Men’s baseball

Representing Chinese Taipei

Baseball World Cup
| Bronze medal – third place | 2001 Taipei | Team |

Intercontinental Cup
| Silver medal – second place | 2002 Havana | Team |
| Bronze medal – third place | 2006 Taichung | Team |

Asian Games
| Silver medal – second place | 2002 Busan | Team |
| Silver medal – second place | 2010 Guangzhou | Team |

Asian Baseball Championship
| Gold medal – first place | 2001 Taipei | Team |
| Silver medal – second place | 2003 Sapporo | Team |
| Bronze medal – third place | 2007 Taichung | Team |

Kao Chih-kang (Chinese: 高志綱; pinyin: Gāo Zhìgāng; Wade–Giles: Kao^{1} Chih^{4} Kang^{1}; born 7 February 1981) is a Taiwanese former professional baseball catcher. He played in the Chinese Professional Baseball League (CPBL) for the Uni-President Lions from 2005 to 2018.

== Career ==
After a brief amateur career in the Taiwan Cooperative Bank he was drafted by the Uni-President Lions of Chinese Professional Baseball League in early 2005 and stayed in this team to date. Kao is widely regarded as the best Taiwanese catcher of his generation, and has been a frequent member of the Chinese Taipei national baseball team since 2001.

Kao is best known for hitting the game-winning RBI in the Chinese Taipei versus South Korea match in the 2003 Asian Baseball Championship series. This victory qualified the Taiwan national baseball team for the 2004 Olympics.

He has competed at both the 2004 and 2008 Summer Olympic Games.

Before the 2012 season, Kao signed his second two-year contract with the Uni-President Lions.

In November 2011, Kao was appointed as the representative of players by the IBAF Asia Department.

== See also ==
- Chinese Professional Baseball League
- Uni-President Lions
