= Kim Ji-chan =

South Korean baseball player (born 2001)

Samsung Lions – No. 64
- Outfielder
- Born: March 8, 2001 (age 25); Iowa, United States
- Bats: Left Throws: Right

KBO debut
- May 5, 2020, for the Samsung Lions

KBO statistics (through 2026)
- Batting average: .320
- Home runs: 0
- Runs batted in: 133
- Stats at Baseball Reference

Teams
- Samsung Lions (2020–present)

Career highlights and awards
- Korean Series champion (2026)
Medals
Men's baseball
Representing South Korea
Asian Games
| Gold medal – first place | 2022 Hangzhou | Team |
| Gold medal – first place | 2026 Aichi–Nagoya | Team |

Kim Ji-chan (Korean: 김지찬; born March 8, 2001) is a South Korean professional baseball player for the Samsung Lions of the KBO League. He competed for the South Korean national baseball team at the 2022 and 2026 Asian Games, winning gold medals.
