= Liu Chih-jung =

Taiwanese baseball player (born 1999)

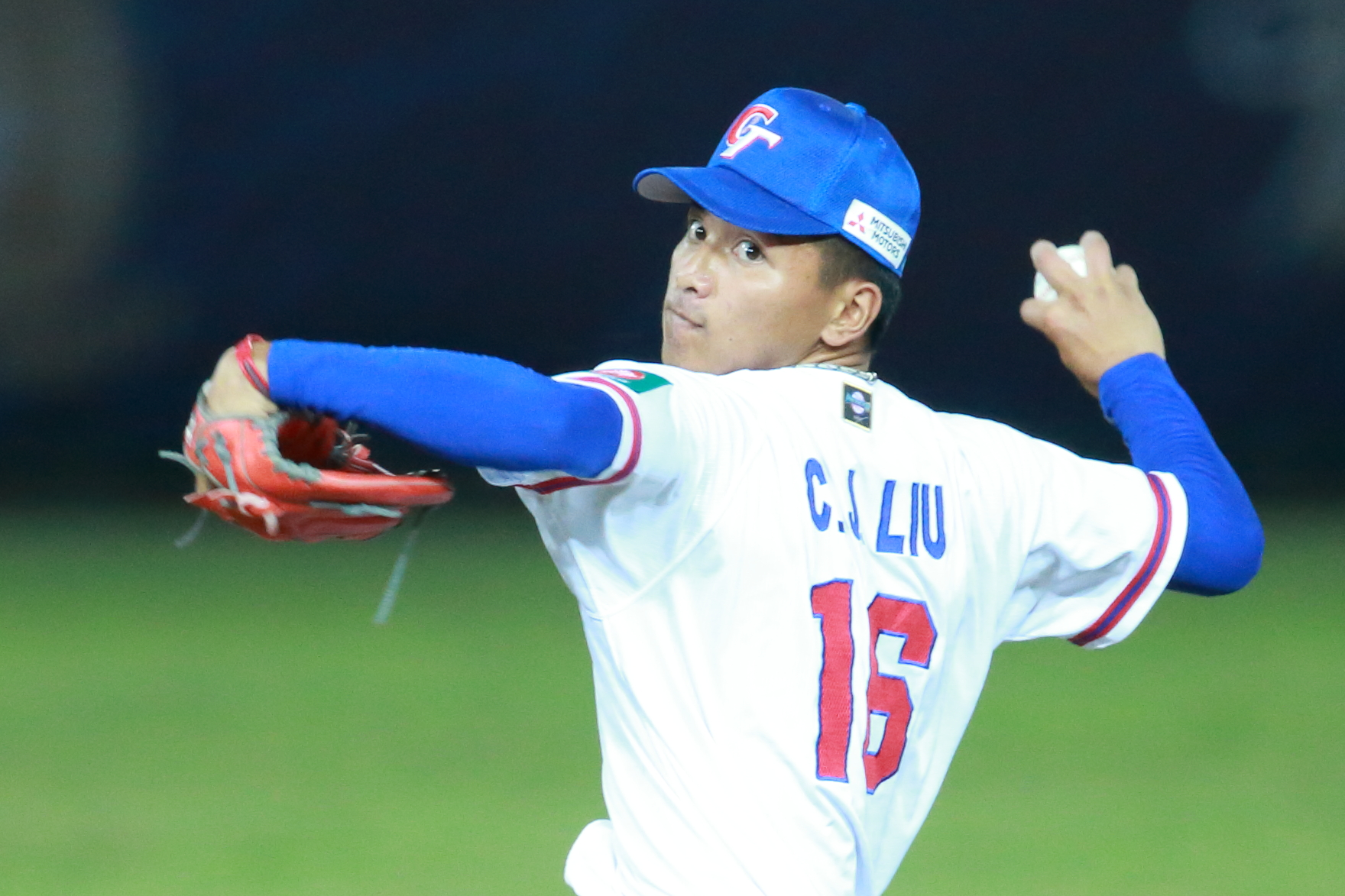

Free agent
- Pitcher
- Born: April 7, 1999 (age 27); Tainan, Taiwan
- Bats: Switch Throws: Right
- Stats at Baseball Reference
Medals
Men's baseball
Representing Chinese Taipei
Asian Baseball Championship
Gold medal – first place	2019 Taichung	Team
Asian Games
Silver medal – second place	2022 Hangzhou	Team

Liu Chih-jung (Chinese: 劉致榮; born April 7, 1999) is a Taiwanese professional baseball pitcher who is a free agent.

Liu was a shortstop and pitcher in high school. Due to a heavy pitching load in high school, his coaches at Chinese Culture University utilized his skills solely as a position player during his first season of collegiate baseball. He returned to pitching in 2019.

== Professional career ==
Liu signed with the Boston Red Sox as a pitcher on October 23, 2019, for US$750,000. Liu arrived in the United States for spring training with the Red Sox in February 2020. After the 2020 minor league season was cancelled due to the COVID-19 pandemic, Liu was invited to participate in the Red Sox' fall instructional league. Liu began the 2021 season in extended spring training, was first assigned to the Florida Complex League Red Sox where he made a single start, and was then promoted to the Salem Red Sox in early July. Overall during the 2021 season, he compiled a 4.23 earned run average (ERA) and 5–1 win–loss record in 13 starts while striking out 60 batters in 55 1/3 innings pitched.

Liu began the 2022 season in High-A with the Greenville Drive. In 25 games (21 starts) with the Drive, he had a 4–11 record with a 6.10 ERA. He also made one start in Double-A for the Portland Sea Dogs, resulting in a no decision after allowing two earned runs in 3 2/3 innings. Liu spent the 2023 season with Portland, pitching to a 7–8 record in 26 games (24 starts) with a 5.35 ERA.

Liu did not appear for the Red Sox organization during the regular season prior to his release on June 11, 2026.

== International career ==
Liu participated in the 2017 U-18 Baseball World Cup for Chinese Taipei as a pitcher and position player. He pitched in the 2019 Asian Baseball Championship, in which he was named the most valuable player, and the Chinese Taipei national baseball team won the gold medal. He was to appear in the 2019 WBSC Premier12, but sat out the tournament due to injuries. Liu competed in baseball at the 2022 Asian Games (the 2022 Asian Games were played in 2023); appearing in two games, he pitched five innings while yielding two hits and striking out eight batters, and won a silver medal with Chinese Taipei.
