= So Hyeong-jun =

South Korean baseball player (born 2001)

KT Wiz – No. 30
- Pitcher
- Born: September 16, 2001 (age 25); Uijeongbu, Gyeonggi Province, South Korea
- Bats: Right Throws: Right

KBO debut
- May 8, 2000, for the KT Wiz

KBO statistics (through 2025)
- Win–loss record: 45–26
- Earned run average: 3.68
- Strikeouts: 424
- Stats at Baseball Reference

Teams
- KT Wiz (2020–present)

Career highlights and awards
- KBO Rookie of the Year (2020); Korean Series champion (2021); KBO Awards - WPCT Award (2026)
Medals
Men's baseball
Representing South Korea
U-18 Baseball World Cup
Bronze medal – third place	2019 Busan	Team

So Hyeong-jun (Korean: 소형준; born September 16, 2001) is a South Korean professional baseball player for the KT Wiz of the KBO League. He won the KBO League Rookie of the Year Award in 2020.

== Career ==
He represented the South Korea national baseball team at the 2026 World Baseball Classic.
