= Jo Byeong-hyeon (baseball) =

South Korean baseball player (born 2002)

SSG Landers – No. 19
- Pitcher
- Born: May 8, 2002 (age 24); Asan, South Chungcheong Province, South Korea
- Bats: Right Throws: Right

KBO debut
- September 24, 2021, for the SSG Landers

KBO statistics (through 2025 season)
- Win–loss record: 9–10
- Earned run average: 2.88
- Strikeouts: 183
- Stats at Baseball Reference

Teams
- SSG Landers (2021–present)

Jo Byeong-hyeon (Korean: 조병현; born May 8, 2002) is a South Korean professional baseball pitcher currently playing for the SSG Landers of the KBO League.

== Career ==
He represented the South Korea national baseball team at the 2026 World Baseball Classic and 2026 Aichi Nagoya Asian Games

Holds the KBO League record for most consecutive strikeouts, 10 in a row
