= Taiga Kojima =

Japanese baseball player (born 2003)

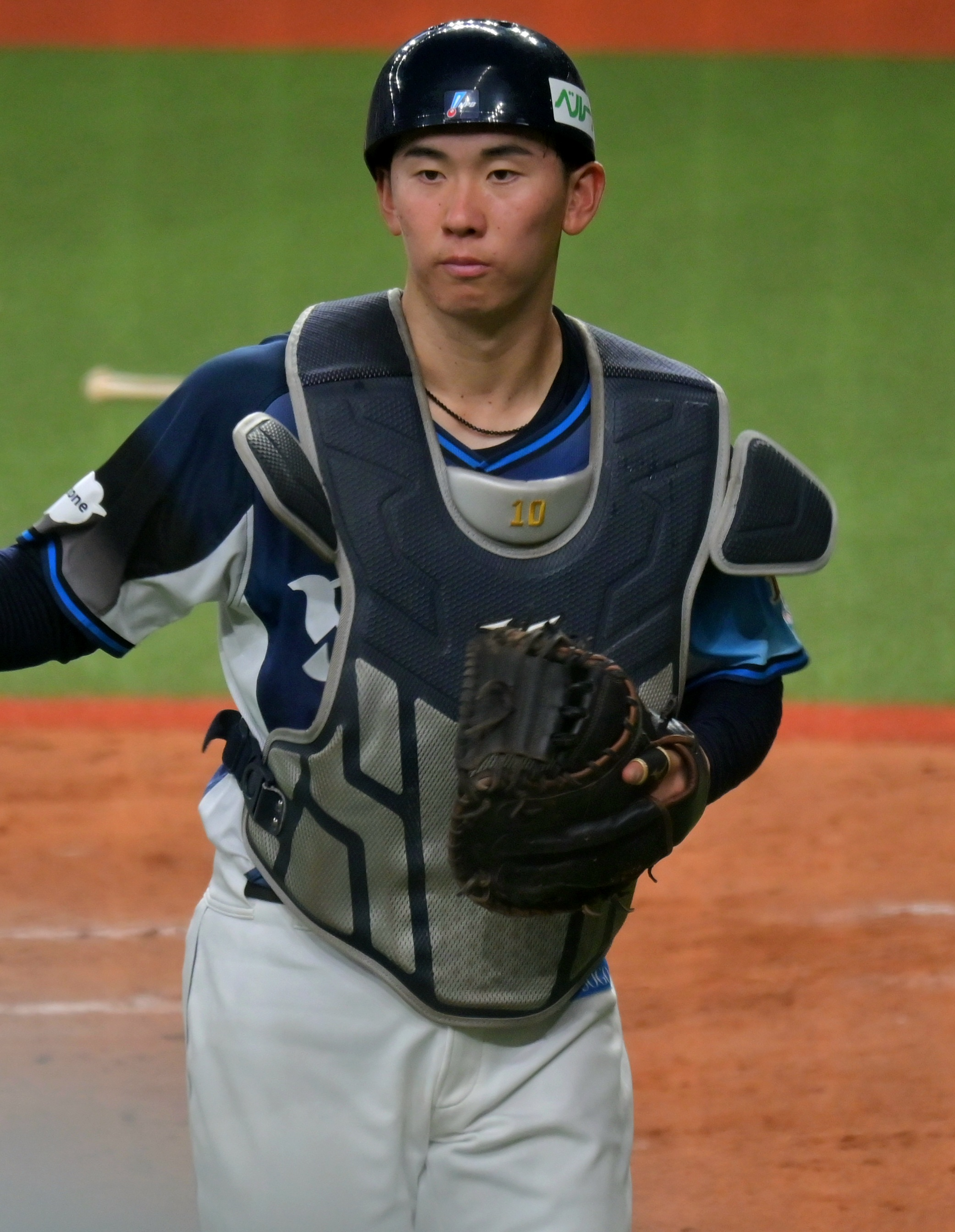

Saitama Seibu Lions – No. 10
- Catcher
- Born: October 27, 2003 (age 22); Isehara, Kanagawa, Japan
- Bats: Left Throws: Right

NPB debut
- March 27, 2026, for the Saitama Seibu Lions

Teams
- Saitama Seibu Lions (2026–present)

Taiga Kojima (小島 大河, Kojima Taiga; born October 27, 2003) is a Japanese professional baseball catcher for the Saitama Seibu Lions of Nippon Professional Baseball (NPB).
