= Lee Jae-hyeon =

South Korean baseball player (born 2003)

Samsung Lions – No. 7
- Shortstop
- Born: February 4, 2003 (age 23); Seoul, South Korea
- Bats: Right Throws: Right

KBO debut
- April 2, 2022, for the Samsung Lions

KBO statistics (through May 26, 2024)
- Batting average: .253
- Home runs: 23
- Runs batted in: 103
- Stats at Baseball Reference

Teams
- Samsung Lions (2022–present)

Career highlights and awards
- Korean Series champion (2026)
Medals
Men's baseball
Representing South Korea
Asian Games
| Gold medal – first place | 2026 Aichi–Nagoya | Team |

Lee Jae-hyeon (Korean: 이재현; born February 4, 2003, in Seoul) is a South Korean shortstop for the Samsung Lions in the Korea Baseball Organization (KBO). He appeared in three baseball contests during the 2026 Asian Games, and won a gold medal for South Korea.
