= Moon Hyun-bin =

South Korean baseball player (born 2004)

Hanwha Eagles – No. 51
- Outfielder
- Born: April 20, 2004 (age 22); Daejeon, South Korea
- Bats: Left Throws: Right

KBO debut
- April 1, 2023, for the Hanwha Eagles

KBO statistics (through 2025 season)
- Batting average: .320
- Home runs: 0
- Runs batted in: 80
- Stats at Baseball Reference

Teams
- Hanwha Eagles (2023–present)
Medals
Men's baseball
Representing South Korea
Asian Games
Gold medal – first place	2026 Aichi–Nagoya	Team

Moon Hyun-bin (Korean: 문현빈; born April 20, 2004) is a South Korean professional baseball outfielder currently playing for the Hanwha Eagles of the KBO League.

== Career ==
He represented the South Korea national baseball team at the 2026 World Baseball Classic.
