= Pan Chung-wei =

Taiwanese baseball player

- First baseman
- Born: August 10, 1976 (age 49); Pingtung County, Taiwan
- Bats: Right Throws: Right

debut
- March 7, 2003, for the First Financial Holdings Agan

Career statistics (through 2008)
- Batting average: .279
- Home run: 35
- Runs batted in: 200
- Stats at Baseball Reference

Teams
- First Financial Holdings Agan (2003); La New Bears (2004–2010)

Pan Chung-wei (simplified Chinese: 潘忠韦; traditional Chinese: 潘忠韋; born August 10, 1976) is a Taiwanese former baseball player who had played for the La New Bears.
