= Kim Young-woo (baseball) =

South Korean baseball player (born 2005)

LG Twins – No. 67
- Pitcher
- Born: January 14, 2005 (age 21); Seoul, South Korea
- Bats: Left Throws: Left

KBO debut
- March 23, 2025, for the LG Twins

KBO statistics (through 2025)
- Win–loss record: 3–0
- Earned run average: 4.36
- Strikeouts: 34
- Stats at Baseball Reference

Teams
- LG Twins (2025–present)
Medals
Men's baseball
Representing South Korea
Asian Games
Gold medal – first place	2026 Aichi–Nagoya	Team

Kim Young-woo (Korean: 김영우; born January 14, 2005) is a South Korean professional baseball pitcher for the LG Twins of the KBO League. He appeared in two baseball contests during the 2026 Asian Games, and won a gold medal for South Korea.
