= Park Jae-hyun (baseball) =

South Korean baseball player (born 2006)

Kia Tigers – No. 15
- Outfielder
- Born: December 8, 2006 (age 19); Incheon, South Korea
- Bats: Left Throws: Right

KBO debut
- March 22, 2025, for the Kia Tigers

KBO statistics (through 2026)
- Batting average: .293
- Home runs: 17
- Runs batted in: 137
- Stats at Baseball Reference

Teams
- KIA Tigers (2025–present)
Medals
Men's baseball
Representing South Korea
Asian Games
Gold medal – first place	2026 Aichi–Nagoya	Team

Park Jae-hyun (Korean: 박재현; born December 8, 2006) is a South Korean professional baseball player for the Kia Tigers of the KBO League. He appeared in five baseball contests during the 2026 Asian Games, and won a gold medal for South Korea.
