= Choi Jun-yong (baseball) =

South Korean baseball player (born 2006)

Lotte Giants – No. 56
- Pitcher
- Born: October 10, 2001 (age 24); Seoul, South Korea
- Bats: Right Throws: Right

KBO debut
- July 15, 2020, for the Lotte Giants

KBO statistics (through 2020)
- Win–loss record: 4–3
- Earned run average: 4.19
- Strikeouts: 57
- Stats at Baseball Reference

Teams
- Lotte Giants (2020–present)
Medals
Men's baseball
Representing South Korea
Asian Games
Gold medal – first place	2026 Aichi–Nagoya	Team

Choi Jun-yong (Korean: 최준용; born January 1, 2006) is a South Korean professional baseball pitcher for the Lotte Giants of the KBO League. He appeared in two baseball contests during the 2026 Asian Games, and won a gold medal for South Korea.
