= Kim Jin-uk =

South Korean baseball player (born 2002)

Lotte Giants – No. 15
- Pitcher
- Born: July 5, 2002 (age 24); Pyeongtaek, Gyeonggi, South Korea
- Bats: Left Throws: Left

KBO debut
- April 9, 2021, for the Lotte Giants

KBO statistics (through May 31, 2024)
- Win–loss record: 9–12
- Earned run average: 6.20
- Strikeouts: 139
- Stats at Baseball Reference

Teams
- Lotte Giants (2021–present)

- Kim Jin-uk
- Hangul: 김진욱
- RR: Gim Jinuk
- MR: Kim Chinuk

Kim Jin-uk (born July 5, 2002) is a Korean professional baseball pitcher for the Lotte Giants of the KBO League.

The Lotte Giants selected Kim with the first selection of the 2021 KBO League draft, and he made his debut for Lotte that year. He was selected for the South Korean national baseball team for the 2020 Summer Olympics, which begin in July 2021.
