= Kim Ju-won (baseball) =

South Korean baseball player (born 2002)

NC Dinos – No. 7
- Shortstop / Second baseman
- Born: July 30, 2002 (age 24); Gunpo, Gyeonggi Province, South Korea
- Bats: Switch Throws: Right

KBO debut
- June 26, 2021, for the NC Dinos

KBO statistics (through 2025)
- Batting average: .254
- Home runs: 49
- Runs batted in: 231
- Stats at Baseball Reference

Teams
- NC Dinos (2021–present)

Career highlights and awards
- 2× KBO All-Star (2023, 2026); KBO Golden Glove Award (2025); KBO Defensive Award (2025)
Medals
Men's baseball
Representing South Korea
Asian Games
Gold medal – first place	2022 Hangzhou	Team
Gold medal – first place	2026 Aichi–Nagoya	Team

Kim Ju-won (Korean: 김주원; born July 30, 2002) is a South Korean professional baseball player for the NC Dinos of the KBO League. Kim appeared in six baseball contests during the 2022 Asian Games, and winning a gold medal for South Korea.
