= Kim Do-yeong =

South Korean baseball player (born 2003)

Kia Tigers – No. 5
- Third baseman
- Born: October 2, 2003 (age 23); Gwangju, South Korea
- Bats: Right Throws: Right

KBO debut
- April 2, 2022, for the Kia Tigers

KBO statistics (through 2025)
- Batting average: .311
- Home runs: 55
- Runs batted in: 202
- Stats at Baseball Reference

Teams
- Kia Tigers (2022–present)

Career highlights and awards
- Korean Series champion (2024); KBO MVP (2024); 3× KBO All-Star (2024–2026); KBO Golden Glove Award (2024); KBO Defensive Award (2026)
Medals
Men's baseball
Representing South Korea
Asian Games
| Gold medal – first place | 2026 Aichi–Nagoya | Team |

Kim Do-yeong (Korean: 김도영; pronounced [kimto̞jʌ̹ŋ]; born October 2, 2003) is a South Korean professional baseball third baseman for the Kia Tigers of the KBO League.

== Career ==
Kim made his KBO debut with the Kia Tigers in 2022. In 2024, he became the youngest player in KBO history to have a 30 home run / 30 stolen base season.

In the 2026 season, he became the youngest player in KBO League history to achieve 40 home runs, 100 RBIs, and 100 runs scored.
