= Cho Hyeong-woo =

South Korean baseball player (born 2006)

SSG Landers – No. 20
- Catcher
- Born: April 4, 2002 (age 24); Gwangju, South Korea
- Bats: Right Throws: Right

KBO debut
- June 15, 2021, for the SSG Landers

KBO statistics (through 2026)
- Batting average: .257
- Home runs: 8
- Runs batted in: 79
- Stats at Baseball Reference

Teams
- SSG Landers (2021–present); Geelong-Korea (2022–2023)
Medals
Men's baseball
Representing South Korea
Asian Games
| Gold medal – first place | 2026 Aichi–Nagoya | Team |

Cho Hyeong-woo (Korean: 조형우; born April 4, 2002) is a South Korean professional baseball catcher for the SSG Landers of the KBO League. He appeared in five games for South Korea at the 2026 Asian Games, where the team won the gold medal.
