= Baseball at the 2002 Asian Games =

- Venue: Sajik Baseball Stadium
- Dates: 2–9 October 2002
- Competitors: 102 from 5 nations

Baseball was one of the many sports which was held at the 2002 Asian Games in Busan, South Korea beginning on October 2, 2002. Five East and Southeast Asian nations participated in the tournament. The competition took place at Sajik Baseball Stadium.

== Schedule ==
P	Preliminary round	½	Semifinals	F	Finals

Event↓/Date →	2nd Wed	3rd Thu	4th Fri	5th Sat	6th Sun	7th Mon	8th Tue	9th Wed
Men	P	P	P	P	P	P	½	F

== Medalists ==
Event	Gold	Silver	Bronze
Men	South Korea; Jang Sung-ho; Park Jin-man; Kim Han-soo; Lee Jong-beom; Lee Byung-kyu; Kim Dong-joo; Kim Min-jae; Kim Jong-kook; No Jang-jin; Lee Seung-ho; Song Jin-woo; Hong Sung-heon; Park Myung-hwan; Lee Young-woo; Lee Seung-yuop; Lim Chang-yong; Kim Jin-woo; Kim Sang-hoon; Lee Sang-hoon; Cho Yong-jun; Jung Jae-bok; Park Jae-hong	Chinese Taipei; Wang Chien-ming; Hong I-chung; Tsai Feng-an; Yang Sung-hsien; Chen Jui-cheng; Chen Chien-wei; Lin Yueh-ping; Chang Chia-hao; Liang Ju-hao; Huang Chin-chih; Huang Chung-yi; Tsai Chung-nan; Pan Wei-lun; Peng Cheng-min; Sun Chao-chi; Wang Chuan-chia; Cheng Chang-ming; Kao Chih-kang; Kuo Hong-chih; Chen Chih-yuan; Hsieh Chia-hsien; Wu Chao-hui	Japan; Daisuke Mori; Go Kida; Yosuke Shinomiya; Kenta Kurihara; Kazunari Tsuruoka; Satoshi Kubota; Keiichi Hirano; Takeshi Koyama; Takayuki Goto; Hiroya Tani; Kazuhiro Semba; Koji Onuma; Koji Yamamoto; Kanehisa Arime; Masanori Yasuda; Toshiyuki Kitagawa; Shingo Maeda; Takashi Yoshiura; Kazuhiro Hatakeyama; Hisao Arakane; Shiro Teramoto; Katsuhiro Nishiura

== Squads ==
Squads

China	Chinese Taipei	Japan	Philippines
Sun Lingfeng; Li Bin; Chen Zhe; Li Qinghua; Liu Jianzhong; Bai Baoliang; Liu Guangbiao; Ye Mingqiang; Jia Yubing; Hou Fenglian; Wang Nan; Sun Wei; Ren Min; Yang Guogang; Zhang Jianwang; Lai Guojun; Li Chenhao; Lü Jiangang	Wang Chien-ming; Hong I-chung; Tsai Feng-an; Yang Sung-hsien; Chen Jui-cheng; Chen Chien-wei; Lin Yueh-ping; Chang Chia-hao; Liang Ju-hao; Huang Chin-chih; Huang Chung-yi; Tsai Chung-nan; Pan Wei-lun; Peng Cheng-min; Sun Chao-chi; Wang Chuan-chia; Cheng Chang-ming; Kao Chih-kang; Kuo Hong-chih; Chen Chih-yuan; Hsieh Chia-hsien; Wu Chao-hui	Daisuke Mori; Go Kida; Yosuke Shinomiya; Kenta Kurihara; Kazunari Tsuruoka; Satoshi Kubota; Keiichi Hirano; Takeshi Koyama; Takayuki Goto; Hiroya Tani; Kazuhiro Semba; Koji Onuma; Koji Yamamoto; Kanehisa Arime; Masanori Yasuda; Toshiyuki Kitagawa; Shingo Maeda; Takashi Yoshiura; Kazuhiro Hatakeyama; Hisao Arakane; Shiro Teramoto; Katsuhiro Nishiura	Charlie Labrador; Junnifer Pinero; Alejandro Velasquez; Ferdinand Recto; Roy Baclay; Ernesto Binarao; Andro Cuyugan; Ruben Angeles; Wilfredo Hidalgo; Fernando Badrina; Virgilio Roxas; Christopher Jimenez; Manolito Binarao; Christian Canlas; Joel Binarao; Ruel Batuto; Roel Empacis; Ricardo Jimenez
South Korea			
Jang Sung-ho; Park Jin-man; Kim Han-soo; Lee Jong-beom; Lee Byung-kyu; Kim Dong-joo; Kim Min-jae; Kim Jong-kook; No Jang-jin; Lee Seung-ho; Song Jin-woo; Hong Sung-heon; Park Myung-hwan; Lee Young-woo; Lee Seung-yuop; Lim Chang-yong; Kim Jin-woo; Kim Sang-hoon; Lee Sang-hoon; Cho Yong-jun; Jung Jae-bok; Park Jae-hong			

== Results ==
All times are Korea Standard Time (UTC+09:00)

=== Preliminary ===
Pos	Team	Pld	W	L	RF	RA	PCT	GB	Qualification
1	South Korea	4	4	0	39	0	1.000	—	Semifinals
2	Japan	4	3	1	30	13	.750	1	Semifinals
3	Chinese Taipei	4	2	2	18	18	.500	2	Semifinals
4	China	4	1	3	15	29	.250	3	Semifinals
5	Philippines	4	0	4	2	44	.000	4	

Source: Official website

2 October; 14:00	China	0–8	South Korea	Sajik Baseball Stadium, Busan
2 October; 14:00	LP: Bai Baoliang		WP: Kim Jin-woo	Sajik Baseball Stadium, Busan

Team	1	2	3	4	5	6	7	8	9	R	H	E
South Korea	4	0	0	1	1	1	1	0	0	8	13	0
China	0	0	0	0	0	0	0	0	0	0	4	1

2 October; 18:00	Japan	8–3	Chinese Taipei	Sajik Baseball Stadium, Busan
2 October; 18:00	WP: Koji Onuma		LP: Wang Chien-ming	Sajik Baseball Stadium, Busan
2 October; 18:00	HR: Takeshi Koyama (1)			Sajik Baseball Stadium, Busan

Team	1	2	3	4	5	6	7	8	9	R	H	E
Chinese Taipei	1	0	0	1	0	0	0	0	1	3	9	1
Japan	0	0	0	0	0	5	0	3	X	8	8	0

3 October; 14:00	Philippines	0–12 (F/7)	Japan	Sajik Baseball Stadium, Busan
3 October; 14:00	LP: Roy Baclay		WP: Kanehisa Arime	Sajik Baseball Stadium, Busan
3 October; 14:00			HR: Go Kida (1), Kazunari Tsuruoka (1)	Sajik Baseball Stadium, Busan

Team	1	2	3	4	5	6	7	8	9	R	H	E
Japan	1	1	5	2	0	2	1	—	—	12	18	1
Philippines	0	0	0	0	0	0	0	—	—	0	2	1

3 October; 18:00	South Korea	7–0	Chinese Taipei	Sajik Baseball Stadium, Busan
3 October; 18:00	WP: Park Myung-hwan		LP: Liang Ju-hao	Sajik Baseball Stadium, Busan

Team	1	2	3	4	5	6	7	8	9	R	H	E
Chinese Taipei	0	0	0	0	0	0	0	0	0	0	4	3
South Korea	1	0	2	0	3	1	0	0	X	7	11	0

4 October; 14:00	Chinese Taipei	11–1 (F/8)	China	Sajik Baseball Stadium, Busan
4 October; 14:00	WP: Tsai Chung-nan		LP: Li Chenhao	Sajik Baseball Stadium, Busan

Team	1	2	3	4	5	6	7	8	9	R	H	E
China	0	0	1	0	0	0	0	0	—	1	8	2
Chinese Taipei	3	1	1	0	4	1	0	1	—	11	13	0

4 October; 18:00	Philippines	0–15 (F/7)	South Korea	Sajik Baseball Stadium, Busan
4 October; 18:00	LP: Fernando Badrina		WP: Jung Jae-bok	Sajik Baseball Stadium, Busan

Team	1	2	3	4	5	6	7	8	9	R	H	E
South Korea	3	1	1	0	1	5	4	—	—	15	22	0
Philippines	0	0	0	0	0	0	0	—	—	0	5	0

5 October; 14:00	Chinese Taipei	4–2	Philippines	Sajik Baseball Stadium, Busan
5 October; 14:00	WP: Lin Yueh-ping		LP: Roy Baclay	Sajik Baseball Stadium, Busan

Team	1	2	3	4	5	6	7	8	9	R	H	E
Philippines	0	0	0	0	0	0	0	1	1	2	4	1
Chinese Taipei	0	0	1	0	3	0	0	0	X	4	6	2

5 October; 18:00	Japan	10–1	China	Sajik Baseball Stadium, Busan
5 October; 18:00	WP: Hiroya Tani		LP: Lai Guojun	Sajik Baseball Stadium, Busan
5 October; 18:00	HR: Kenta Kurihara (1), Hisao Arakane (1)			Sajik Baseball Stadium, Busan

Team	1	2	3	4	5	6	7	8	9	R	H	E
China	1	0	0	0	0	0	0	0	0	1	5	2
Japan	1	2	2	1	1	1	0	2	X	10	16	0

6 October; 18:55	South Korea	9–0	Japan	Sajik Baseball Stadium, Busan
6 October; 18:55	WP: Song Jin-woo		LP: Kazuhiro Semba	Sajik Baseball Stadium, Busan
6 October; 18:55	HR: Kim Dong-joo (1)			Sajik Baseball Stadium, Busan

Team	1	2	3	4	5	6	7	8	9	R	H	E
Japan	0	0	0	0	0	0	0	0	0	0	3	2
South Korea	1	0	6	2	0	0	0	0	X	9	12	0

7 October; 14:00	China	13–0 (F/7)	Philippines	Sajik Baseball Stadium, Busan
7 October; 14:00	WP: Li Chenhao		LP: Ernesto Binarao	Sajik Baseball Stadium, Busan
7 October; 14:00	HR: Sun Wei (1)			Sajik Baseball Stadium, Busan

Team	1	2	3	4	5	6	7	8	9	R	H	E
Philippines	0	0	0	0	0	0	0	—	—	0	3	6
China	0	1	2	0	7	3	X	—	—	13	15	0

=== Final round ===
Semifinals
8 October
South Korea	7
China	2
8 October
Japan	5
Chinese Taipei (F/10)	6

Final
9 October
South Korea	4
Chinese Taipei	3
3rd–4th
9 October
China	4
Japan	7

==== Semifinals ====
8 October; 14:00	South Korea	7–2	China	Sajik Baseball Stadium, Busan
8 October; 14:00	WP: Cho Yong-jun		LP: Bai Baoliang	Sajik Baseball Stadium, Busan

Team	1	2	3	4	5	6	7	8	9	R	H	E
China	0	0	2	0	0	0	0	0	0	2	8	0
South Korea	0	0	1	1	0	1	3	1	X	7	12	0

8 October; 18:00	Japan	5–6 (F/10)	Chinese Taipei	Sajik Baseball Stadium, Busan
8 October; 18:00	LP: Koji Yamamoto		WP: Wang Chien-ming	Sajik Baseball Stadium, Busan
8 October; 18:00	HR: Go Kida (1)		HR: Chen Chih-yuan (1), Chen Chien-wei (1)	Sajik Baseball Stadium, Busan

Team	1	2	3	4	5	6	7	8	9	10	R	H	E
Chinese Taipei	0	0	0	0	0	4	0	0	1	1	6	9	0
Japan	0	2	3	0	0	0	0	0	0	0	5	9	1

==== 3rd–4th ====
9 October; 14:00	Japan	7–4	China	Sajik Baseball Stadium, Busan
9 October; 14:00	WP: Kanehisa Arime		LP: Ye Mingqiang	Sajik Baseball Stadium, Busan
9 October; 14:00	HR: Go Kida (1), Satoshi Kubota (1)			Sajik Baseball Stadium, Busan

Team	1	2	3	4	5	6	7	8	9	R	H	E
China	0	2	0	0	0	2	0	0	0	4	10	0
Japan	0	0	0	3	2	0	0	2	X	7	9	2

==== Final ====
9 October; 18:00	South Korea	4–3	Chinese Taipei	Sajik Baseball Stadium, Busan
9 October; 18:00	WP: Lim Chang-yong		LP: Tsai Chung-nan	Sajik Baseball Stadium, Busan

Team	1	2	3	4	5	6	7	8	9	R	H	E
Chinese Taipei	0	0	2	0	0	0	0	1	0	3	8	2
South Korea	0	1	0	3	0	0	0	0	X	4	4	0

== Final standing ==
Rank	Team	Pld	W	L
1st place, gold medalist(s)	South Korea	6	6	0
2nd place, silver medalist(s)	Chinese Taipei	6	3	3
3rd place, bronze medalist(s)	Japan	6	4	2
4	China	6	1	5
5	Philippines	4	0	4
