= Gyeonggi-do Independent Baseball League =

South Korean independent baseball league

- Sport: Baseball
- Founded: 2019
- No. of teams: 9 (2026 season)
- Country: South Korea
- Most recent champion: Yeoncheon Miracle
- Website: www.gibl.kr

The Gyeonggi-do Independent Baseball League (Korean: 독립야구단 경기도리그), also known as the Gyeonggi-do League or by its English initialism GIBL, is an independent baseball league in Gyeonggi Province, South Korea.

Organized by the Gyeonggi Baseball Softball Association with financial support from the provincial government, it has operated continuously since 2019 and has been described in Korean press coverage as the only independent baseball league currently active in the country. The league gives players who were not drafted by, or who were released from, KBO League organizations a venue to continue competing in hopes of a professional contract.

== History ==
The league was launched by Gyeonggi Province in 2019 following months of coordination among the provincial sports council, the Gyeonggi Baseball Softball Association, and representatives of the independent clubs themselves. The inaugural season opened on April 23, 2019, with a game between Seongnam Blue Panthers and Yangju Revolution, and featured six founding clubs: Seongnam Blue Panthers, Goyang Winners, Yangju Revolution, Yeoncheon Miracle, Paju Challengers, and Uijeongbu Shinhan University Phoenix. Games were played roughly once or twice a week through September 26 at Team Up Campus, a multi-field sports complex in Gwangju.

In July 2021, the provincial government enacted the "Ordinance on Fostering and Supporting Independent Baseball in Gyeonggi Province," giving the league a formal legal and budgetary basis. The following year, the province added allowances for team managers and coaches on top of existing league operating funds and per-game appearance payments, citing a goal of more stable league operations.

By 2024, provincial officials said the league had produced a cumulative total of 34 players who went on to sign with KBO organizations since its 2019 founding, including a league-record 15 in the 2023 season alone — among them Jin Woo-young of Paju Challengers, Choi Su-bin of Goyang Winners, and Hwang Young-muk of Yeoncheon Miracle.

As of the 2026 season, marking the league's eighth year of play, the competition featured nine clubs.

== Format ==
The league has historically run a regular season followed by a postseason among the top three finishers. As of the 2022 season, each of the six participating teams played 40 games (120 total across the league) over a roughly seven-month season running from late March to October. In the postseason, the second- and third-place regular-season finishers meet in a best-of-three series, with the winner advancing to face the first-place team in a best-of-five series for the league championship.

== Teams ==
=== Current teams (2026 season) ===
Teams in the Gyeonggi-do Independent Baseball League, 2026 season
Team	Hometown
Yeoncheon Miracle	Yeoncheon
Seongnam Magpies	Seongnam
Pocheon Monsters	Pocheon
Gapyeong Whales	Gapyeong
Suwon Pine Eagles	Suwon
Goyang PIC	Goyang
Hwaseong Koryo	Hwaseong
Ansan Waves	Ansan
Dongducheon Prius	Dongducheon

Source: Seoul Economic Daily, May 21, 2026.

=== League membership by season ===
League membership by season, as reported in contemporary news coverage
Season	Teams	Source
2019 (founding)	Seongnam Blue Panthers, Goyang Winners, Yangju Revolution, Yeoncheon Miracle, Paju Challengers, Uijeongbu Shinhan University Phoenix	
2022	Yeoncheon Miracle, Goyang Winners, Paju Challengers, Seongnam Macpies, Pocheon Monsters, Gapyeong Whales	
2024	Yeoncheon Miracle, Seongnam Macpies, Paju Challengers, Gapyeong Whales, Suwon Pine Eagles, Pocheon Monsters, Goyang Wonders	
2026	Yeoncheon Miracle, Seongnam Magpies, Pocheon Monsters, Gapyeong Whales, Suwon Pine Eagles, Goyang PIC, Hwaseong Koryo, Ansan Waves, Dongducheon Prius	

Some club names have changed between the seasons for which press coverage is available — for example, Goyang's franchise has appeared as "Winners," "Wonders," and "PIC" in different years, and Seongnam's as "Blue Panthers" and later "Magpies"/"Macpies" (spelling varies between English-language sources). No independent source confirms whether these represent continuous franchises under new names or separate club foldings and foundings, so this should not be presented as settled fact without further sourcing. Paju Challengers and Uijeongbu Shinhan University Phoenix, both founding members in 2019, do not appear in 2026 coverage; the circumstances and timing of their departure from the league are not confirmed by any source found.

=== KBO Dream Cup ===
In June 2023, teams from the league took part in the inaugural KBO Dream Cup, a tournament hosted by the Korea Baseball Organization with support from the Ministry of Culture, Sports and Tourism and Hoengseong County, and sponsorship from Dong-A Otsuka. Paju Challengers defeated Yeoncheon Miracle 6–3 in the final, played at the KBO Baseball Center in Hoengseong, after trailing 1–2 before scoring four runs in the bottom of the fifth inning. Paju starter Jin Woo-young, a former Kansas City Royals minor league pitcher, was named tournament MVP after allowing two runs over five innings with seven strikeouts. The champions received a trophy and a prize of 20 million won, with KBO commissioner Huh Koo-yeon in attendance at the final.

=== Exhibition games with Choi Kang Monsters ===
The league's all-star team has played televised exhibition games against the Choi Kang Monsters (Korean: 최강 몬스터즈), a team from the JTBC variety program A Clean Sweep (Korean: 최강야구), managed by Kim Sung-keun. The first meeting was announced by the Gyeonggi Baseball Softball Association on July 4, 2023, for a game at Gocheok Sky Dome on July 9; tickets sold out immediately upon release. Choi Kang Monsters won the game in front of a crowd of roughly 16,000, with Yeoncheon Miracle's Hwang Young-muk — on loan to the league all-star roster for the exhibition despite also being a Choi Kang Monsters player — recording two extra-base hits against former teammates.

=== Player eligibility controversy ===
In March 2025, Yongin Dragons, a club in the league, moved to register pitcher Seo Jun-won, who had been permanently disqualified by the KBO after a conviction for soliciting sexually explicit images from a minor. (Note: Seo had been drafted by the Lotte Giants in 2019 and pitched four KBO seasons before his release and subsequent prosecution.) Dragons representative Kim Seok-won told Yonhap that the club had completed Seo's league registration and that the league office had issued an interpretation finding no eligibility barrier to his registration, though consent from other clubs had not yet been secured. Kim said he wanted to give Seo "one last chance" to redeem himself through baseball. The move drew criticism from baseball commentators; one opinion piece argued that an individual club could not unilaterally decide to forgive Seo on behalf of the league and its fans. Amid continuing controversy, the Dragons withdrew the registration attempt without ever filing it formally with the Korea Baseball Softball Association, with Kim citing a wish to avoid further disruption.

== See also ==
- Baseball in South Korea
- KBO Futures League
- KBO League
- Korea Baseball Organization
