= Success of tournament in the World Baseball Classic =

Television show ratings

The WBC championship game was televised in the United States on Fox in English and on Fox Deportes in Spanish. Play-by-play announcer Joe Davis and color analyst John Smoltz called the English language broadcast of the games for Fox, and were joined by Ken Rosenthal and Tom Verducci as field reporters. The game averaged 10.8 million viewers on Fox and Fox Deportes combined, peaking at 12.1 million during the later stages of the game.

The Japan v. South Korea game averaged 62 million viewers in Japan.

The Korean rating in that game was the second-most-watched WBC game in South Korea, after the 2009 Japan-South Korea final.

In Puerto Rico, the final was the most watched sporting event for the past year with nearly three-fourths of all households tuning in.

In Latin America, a first-round game between the United States and Mexico, was the third-most-watched game in the history of ESPN Dos, one of the three Spanish-language channels of ESPN in Latin America.

In the Czech Republic, about 840,000 people watched the WBC games through ČT, marking a significant milestone as the country's first-ever live terrestrial broadcast of baseball.

In Italy, the 2026 WBC sparked an unprecedented baseball boom, culminating in a historic milestone where over 7 million viewers watched the semifinal match against Venezuela.

== Viewership records ==
Most watched World Baseball Classic games in the United States

| Rank | Date | Matchup | | | | Network | Viewers (millions) | Round |
|---|---|---|---|---|---|---|---|---|
| 1 | Tuesday, March 17, 2026 | Venezuela | 3 | United States | 2 | Fox Fox Deportes | 10.87 | Final |
| 2 | Sunday, March 15, 2026 | United States | 2 | Dominican Republic | 1 | Fox Sports 1 Fox Deportes | 7.37 | Semifinal |
| 3 | Monday, March 9, 2026 | United States | 5 | Mexico | 3 | Fox; Fox Deportes | 5.02 | Group Play |
| 4 | Tuesday, March 21, 2023 | Japan | 3 | United States | 2 | Fox; Fox Deportes | 4.97 | Final |
| 5 | Friday, March 13, 2026 | United States | 5 | Canada | 3 | Fox; Fox Deportes | 4.30 | Quarterfinal |
| 6 | Wednesday, March 22, 2017 | United States | 8 | Puerto Rico | 0 | MLB Network; ESPN2; ESPN Deportes | 3.05 | Final |
| 7 | Saturday, March 7, 2026 | United States | 9 | (United Kingdom) Great Britain | 1 | Fox; Fox Deportes | 2.98 | Pool Play |
| 8 | Sunday, March 22, 2009 | Japan | 9 | United States | 4 | ESPN; ESPN Deportes | 2.95 | Semifinal |
| 9 | Saturday, March 14, 2026 | Venezuela | 8 | Japan | 5 | Fox; Fox Deportes | 2.80 | Quarterfinal |
| 10 | Friday, March 6, 2026 | United States | 15 | Brazil | 5 | Fox; Fox Deportes | 2.69 | Pool Play |

World Baseball Classic television ratings in Japanese archipelago showing network(s) broadcast on and average viewership, 2023
| Classic | Date | | | | |
| Classic | Date | Network(s) | Avg. viewers(Millions) | Rating | Share |
|---|---|---|---|---|---|
| Quarterfinals | Mar 16, 2023 | TBS; TV Asahi | 38.16 | 48.0 | Unknown |
| Game 2 | Mar 10, 2023 | TBS; TV Asahi | 29.86 | 44.4 | Unknown |
| Game 4 | Mar 12, 2023 | TBS; TV Asahi | 34.25 | 43.2 | Unknown |
| Game 3 | Mar 11, 2023 | TBS; TV Asahi | 34.25 | 43.1 | Unknown |
| Semifinals | Mar 20, 2023 | TBS; TV Asahi | 27.02 | 42.5 | Unknown |
| Finals | Mar 22, 2023 | TBS; TV Asahi | 27.61 | 42.4 | Unknown |
| Game 1 | Mar 9, 2023 | TBS; TV Asahi | 28.56 | 41.9 | Unknown |

== See also ==
- World Series television ratings
