= Kenta Kurihara =

Japanese baseball player (born 1982)

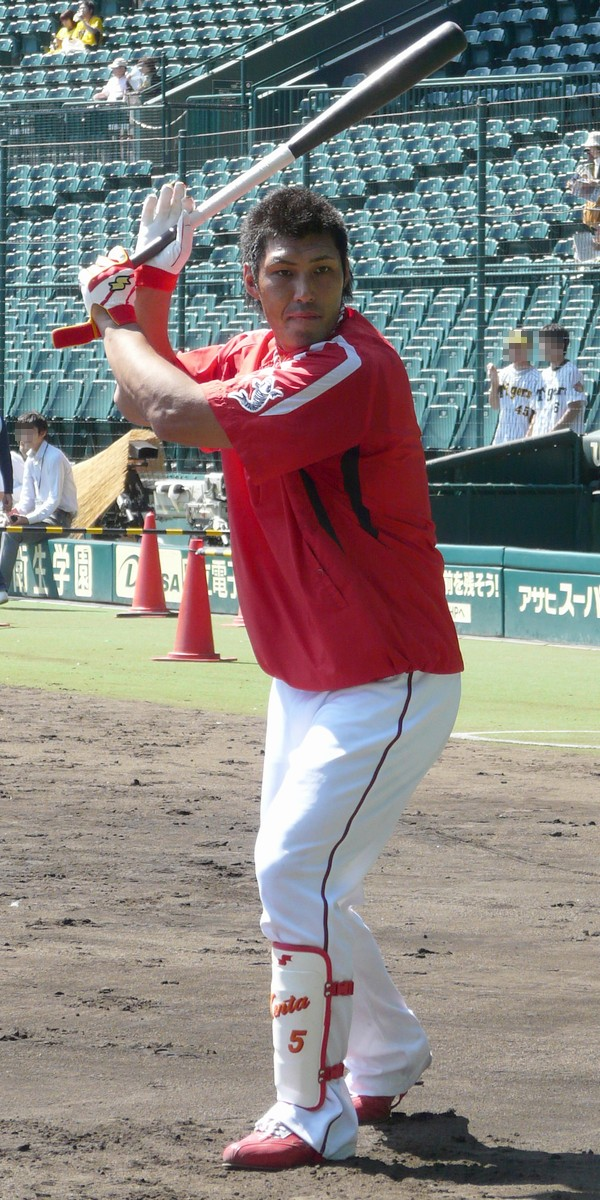
- Kurihara with the Hiroshima Toyo Carp in 2009

Chiba Lotte Marines – No. 77
- First baseman / Coach
- Born: January 8, 1982 (age 44); Tendō, Yamagata, Japan
- Batted: Right-handed Threw: Right

NPB debut
- August 31, 2002, for the Hiroshima Toyo Carp

Last NPB appearance
- May 5, 2013, for the Hiroshima Toyo Carp

NPB statistics
- Batting average: .293
- Home runs: 153
- Runs batted in: 586
- Stats at Baseball Reference

Teams
- As player: Hiroshima Toyo Carp (2000–2013); As coach: Tohoku Rakuten Golden Eagles (2017–2019); Chunichi Dragons (2020–2021); Chiba Lotte Marines (2023–present)

Career highlights and awards
- 3× Golden Glove Award winner (2008, 2009, 2011); Best Nine Award (2011); 3× NPB All-Star (2007, 2009, 2011)
Medals
Representing Japan
Men's baseball
World Baseball Classic
Gold medal – first place	2009 Los Angeles	Team

Kenta Kurihara (栗原 健太, Kurihara Kenta; born January 8, 1982) is a Japanese former professional baseball infielder who played for the Hiroshima Toyo Carp and the Tohoku Rakuten Golden Eagles. He was last a batting coach for the Chunichi Dragons.

The Carp's main cleanup hitter during the early 2000s, Kurihara blossomed into one of the most feared power threats in the Central League. He played in the 2009 World Baseball Classic as an emergency replacement for Shuichi Murata, who suffered an injury in the second round of the tournament.

== Early life ==
Kurihara was born in Tendō, a small city in northern Yamagata Prefecture. He began playing baseball as a third grader, quickly working his way into his Little League team's cleanup spot and becoming their ace pitcher as well. He remained a pitcher throughout junior high but was also noted for winning the high jump, 100-meter dash and shot put in the citywide track and field event.

Kurihara went on to Nihon University Yamagata Senior High School, a private affiliate school of Nihon University. Though the school's then-baseball coach Yoshiya Shibuya had scouted him since Kurihara's junior high days and planned to continue using him as a pitcher, Shibuya was astonished by the bat speed as well as bat control with which Kurihara effortlessly drove ball after ball over the fence in batting practice. Kurihara was converted to the infield and made the team's No. 5 hitter in the summer of his first year (the equivalent of tenth grade in the United States) and had become the cleanup hitter by the fall.

Kurihara hit over .700 with two home runs in the Tohoku Regional Tournament held in the spring of 1998, his junior year, and led his team to a berth in the 80th National High School Baseball Championship that summer, but they lost to Seiryo High School, the Ishikawa champions, 10-1 in the first round (Kurihara went 1-for-4 with the team's lone RBI).

Though that appearance ended up being his first and only on the national stage, Kurihara was a highly coveted position player with plus-power and speed by his senior year (1999) and was being scouted by 11 different NPB teams. He hit 39 home runs for his high school career and lifted a maximum of 120 kg (260 lb) on the bench press, squatted a maximum of 330 kg (730 lb) and ran the 50- and 100-meter sprints in 6.0 and 11.7 seconds, respectively. Despite rumors that the Yakult Swallows were looking to take him in the upper rounds, Kurihara was picked in the third round of the 1999 NPB amateur draft by the Hiroshima Toyo Carp, becoming the only active player from Yamagata Prefecture in all of Japanese professional baseball (he remained so until the end of the 2002 season).

== Professional career ==
=== Early years: 2000–2003 ===
Kurihara spent the entirety of his first two seasons in the pros with the Carp's nigun team (Japanese for "minor league" or "farm team"), often battling with various injuries. He managed to hit .306 in his second season (2001) in the Western League.

=== 2002 ===
Kurihara became the nigun team's cleanup hitter for his third season in the pros and was chosen to play in the 2002 Fresh All-Star Game (the Japanese equivalent of the All-Star Futures Game) that summer, starting in the cleanup spot for the Western League (minors) team in the game held on July 11 (though he went 0-for-4 with two strikeouts). He was called up to the ichigun ("major league") team in late August, making his professional debut as a pinch hitter in a game against the Chunichi Dragons on August 31 (he grounded out to short against right-hander Daisuke Yamai). He made his first start on September 4 against the Hanshin Tigers as the team's No. 7 hitter and third baseman and hitting a home run off Tigers right-hander (and current closer) Kyuji Fujikawa for the first hit of his career the following day (September 5).

Kurihara hit .305 with six home runs and 50 RBIs in the Western League that season, leading the league in RBIs and finishing third in batting average among all qualifying players. He was chosen to play in the 14th Asian Games held in Busan as a member of the Japanese national team along with other industrial league and minor league players (one from each of the twelve NPB teams) after the regular season.

=== 2003 ===
Despite high expectations by the Carp organization for the 2003 season, Kurihara struggled to secure a permanent spot on the ichigun team's roster, going back and forth between the majors and minors. He hit .315 with 13 home runs and 53 RBIs in the Western League, leading the league in homers and RBIs and finishing second in batting average (marking the third straight year he had hit over .300). He also improved his slugging percentage from .446 to .586 and struck out just 24 times. However, he played in just 26 games at the ichigun level, hitting .276 (but with a meager .286 on-base percentage) with three homers and six RBI. He recorded his first career stolen base on April 16 against the Yomiuri Giants.

=== 2004 ===
Kurihara played well in the 2004 pre-season, hitting .250 with three home runs but knocking in a team-high 16 RBI. He made his first start in the season opener of his career as the Carp's No. 6 hitter and first baseman, starting the season off slowly but going on to make 61 starts at the ichigun level (often over teammate and fellow corner infielder Takahiro Arai, who was both older and more experienced at the time) and hitting .267 with 11 homers and 32 RBIs in 90 total games.

On October 2, with the Carp finding themselves tied in the ninth inning with two outs and runners on second and third in a close game against the Tigers, Kurihara swung and missed with two strikes but failed to realize that catcher Akihiro Yano had failed to catch the pitch. Though outfielder Shigenobu Shima came racing home to score the game-winning run, Kurihara failed to run to first, resulting in his being tagged out and costing his team a win (the game ended a 4-4 tie in extra innings as per NPB regulations). Though the Carp were already far out of title contention at the time, the baserunning blunder drew the ire of then-manager Koji Yamamoto, who removed Kurihara from the active roster and sent him down to the minors, declining to use him at all for the remaining eight games of the season despite opting to rest many of his starters and use other young players in place of them.

Kurihara married a batgirl who worked at Hiroshima Municipal Stadium, the Carp's home ballpark, at the end of the year.

=== 2005 ===
Despite hopes that he would cement his place in the Carp's starting lineup, Kurihara missed the opener of the 2005 season due to injuries. While he did not play at the ichigun level until June 21 in a game against the Swallows and did not see his first start until June 28 against the Tigers, he hit .275 with five home runs and 18 RBIs and slugged .551 in a 20-game rehab stint in the minors, leading then-nigun team manager Tomio Kinoshita to say that it would be last time Kurihara would ever play at Yū Baseball Ground, the home of the Carp's farm team. Kurihara replaced teammate Kenjiro Nomura at first base after the veteran got his 2000th career hit and went on to play in 77 games, making 66 starts and hitting .323 with 15 homers and 43 RBI. He hit .352 with 10 homers and 21 RBIs in the month of August alone and his .366 on-base and .563 slugging percentage were all career highs, as were his numbers in all three Triple Crown categories.

Kurihara had his uniform number changed from 50 to 5 during the off-season. His wife gave birth to their first child (a daughter) that July and held their wedding reception in December.

=== 2006 ===
Kurihara spent much of January 2006 in Arizona to prepare for the coming 2006 season, reducing his body fat percentage from 10 to 9 percent and bulking up until he weighed 100 kg (220 lb). He saw his first start in the cleanup spot on May 24 in an interleague game against the Orix Buffaloes (though he went 0-for-3 with a pair of strikeouts and a walk) and hit .379 with five home runs and 23 RBIs that month. He got hot in July as well, hitting .305 with seven homers and 19 RBIs and winning the first Central League monthly Most Valuable Player award of his career.

Kurihara experienced pain in his lower back in August and was found to have a spinal disc hernia upon further diagnosis, forcing him to undergo surgery on August 23 and miss the remainder of the season. (Ironically, right-hander and then-staff ace Hiroki Kuroda, who was the co-winner of the monthly MVP award along with Kurihara, also suffered an injury that same month and ended up missing much of the season.) Regardless, Kurihara played in 109 games until his season-ending injury, hitting .295 with 20 homers and 69 RBI.

=== 2007 ===
Kurihara began his off-season workout in Arizona for the second straight year alongside teammates Shima and Kei Yoshida, bringing his body fat percentage back down to 9 percent (from its peak of 13 percent while he was out due to injury) and his weight to 92 kg (203 lb). He played in all 144 games for the first time in his career despite bone spurs in his elbow and finished the 2007 season with a .310 batting average (fifth in the league), 25 home runs and 92 RBI. He was the only right-handed hitter in the league that finished with a slugging average of over .500 and less than 100 strikeouts that year. He was also equally effective against left-handed and right-handed pitchers, hitting .307 with 10 homers and a .564 slugging percentage against lefties and .311 with 15 homers and a .490 slugging percentage against righties. In particular, his two-run home run off Tigers closer Kyuji Fujikawa (who was then on pace to set an NPB record for most saves in a single season) on September 13 was the first home run that Fujikawa had allowed all season.

=== 2008 ===
With the Takahiro Arai's departure via free agency to the Tigers, Kurihara was officially appointed the team's cleanup hitter for the 2008 season. While he struggled in the opening weeks of the season, hitting .290 but with just two home runs and six RBIs for the month of April, he hit .347 with three homers and 17 RBIs (slugging .505) in 24 games in interleague play and .408 with six homers and 18 RBIs in the month of July. He started all 144 games in the cleanup spot, hitting .332 with 23 homers and 103 RBI and keeping the Carp in playoff contention for much of the season. He marked career highs in batting average (third in the league), hits (185; second), RBIs (fourth) and had the third-most plate appearances (616) of any player in the league. His 68 strikeouts were the fewest in any season in which he had played more than 100 games thus far and the second-fewest of any player in the league who had hit more than 20 homers (Giants catcher Shinnosuke Abe hit 24 homers and struck out a mere 66 times).

Following the regular season, Kurihara and Arai (now with the Tigers) were both presented the Central League Golden Glove award at first base, marking the first time two players were chosen at the same position since then-Giants right-hander Masumi Kuwata and then-Dragons left-hander Shinji Imanaka won the award as pitchers in 1993. He underwent endoscopic surgery to remove articular cartilage fragments (the largest some 1.5 cm (0.59 in) in diameter) in his elbow during the off-season.

== Coaching career ==
After retirement, Kurihara was installed as coach for the Eagles before joining former colleague, Tsuyoshi Yoda at the Chunichi Dragons as 2-gun hitting coach from the 2020 season.

== International career ==
=== 2002 Asian Games ===
Kurihara saw his first stint on the international stage in 2002, playing in the 14th Asian Games as a member of the Japanese national team (consisting entirely of industrial league and minor league players). He hit a home run against China in the preliminary round on October 5 as the starting first baseman and No. 6 hitter and contributed to Japan's bronze medal finish.

=== 2009 World Baseball Classic ===
Though Kurihara was named to the national team's provisional roster for the 2009 World Baseball Classic and took part in the training camp held in Miyazaki in mid-February, he was ultimately cut from the final 28-man team, perhaps partly due to the condition of his elbow, which he had had surgery on during the off-season). However, he was named one of the team's primary backup players and got his chance when Yokohama BayStars slugger Shuichi Murata, the team's cleanup hitter, tore his hamstring while rounding first base in the second-round seeding match against South Korea, held in San Diego on March 19. National team manager Tatsunori Hara immediately called upon Kurihara to join the team. Hara later said that he contacted Kurihara, whose dedication and commitment had impressed him during the Miyazaki camp, within five minutes of learning of the seriousness of Murata's injury.

Kurihara arrived in San Diego on March 21, the day before the semi-finals against the United States, and struggled to overcome the jet lag and fatigue due to travel, going 0-for-3, striking out twice and grounding into a double play. However, Japan won anyway, defeating the United States 9-4 in the semi-finals on March 22 and South Korea 5-3 in the finals on March 23 to earn their second consecutive title.

== Playing style ==
=== Hitting ===
Listed at 183 cm (72 in) and 97 kg (214 lb), Kurihara is a burly right-handed pull hitter. While he does not have exceptional plate discipline (.352 career on-base percentage as of May 16, 2009), he strikes out less often than other power hitters. He is particularly adept at hitting breaking balls but has gradually improved on his ability to hit fastballs from year to year. He also has no trouble going the opposite way and remains one of the few players in Japanese professional baseball that has power to all fields. He has commented that he modeled his swing after Hiromitsu Ochiai, who played for the Lotte Orions, Dragons, Giants and Nippon-Ham Fighters and won Triple Crown honors in 1982, 1985, and 1986.

=== Fielding ===
Though Kurihara entered the pros as a third baseman, he switched to first base during his days in the minors and has played that position almost exclusively since 2006. Kurihara was never regarded as being particularly skilled defensively, winning the Gold Glove award at first base in 2008 but becoming the subject of criticism by many who believed he was chosen largely on merit of his offensive production. He was also plagued by a chronically loose shoulder joint earlier in his career, so much so that he was once prohibited from diving for balls by the nigun coaching staff upon dislocating his shoulder in a minor league game.
