= Kim Jong-kook (disambiguation) =

- Hangul: 김종국
- RR: Gim Jongguk
- MR: Kim Chongguk

Kim Jong-kook, born 1976, is a South Korean singer.

Kim Jong-kook or Kim Jong-gook may also refer to:

- Kim Jong-gook (comedian) (born 1963), South Korean comedian
- Kim Jong-kook (baseball) (born 1973), South Korean baseball player
- Kim Jong-kook (footballer) (born 1989), South Korean football player
