= Kim Jin-woo =

Kim Jin-woo may refer to:

- Kim Jin-woo (footballer) (born 1975), South Korean footballer
- Kim Jin-woo (baseball) (born 1983), South Korean baseball player
- Kim Jin-woo (swimmer) (born 1983), Kenyan swimmer
- Kim Jin-woo (actor) (born 1983), South Korean actor
- Kim Jin-woo (musician) (born 1991), South Korean singer, member of boy band Winner
- Stephen Jin-Woo Kim (born 1967), American man of Korean descent imprisoned for disclosing classified information to a journalist
- Kim Jinu (born 1971), South Korean singer, member of duo Jinusean
