= Canoeing at the 2026 Asian Games – Mixed K-2 500 metres =

Mixed K-2 500 metres at the 2026 Asian Games
- Venue: Miyoshi Lake
- Date: 24–26 September 2026
- Competitors: 20 from 10 nations

Medalists
gold medal	Li Chenhao; Zhang Luxi	China
silver medal	Choi Min-kyu; Seon Min-ju	South Korea
bronze medal	Rin Fukuda; Akihiro Inoue	Japan

The mixed sprint K-2 (kayak double) 500 metres competition at the 2026 Asian Games was held on 24 and 26 September 2026.

== Schedule ==
All times are Japan Standard Time (UTC+09:00)

Date	Time	Event
Thursday, 24 September 2026	15:00	Heats
Saturday, 26 September 2026	10:20	Semifinal
Saturday, 26 September 2026	12:00	Final A

== Results ==
=== Heats ===
- Qualification: 1–3 → Final (FA), Rest → Semifinal (SF)

==== Heat 1 ====
Rank	Team	Time	Notes
1	China (CHN); Li Chenhao; Zhang Luxi	1:40.782	FA
2	Vietnam (VIE); Huỳnh Cao Minh; Đỗ Thị Thanh Thảo	1:43.591	FA
3	Indonesia (INA); Subhi; Stevani Maysche Ibo	1:48.988	FA
4	Thailand (THA); Panwad Thongnim; Nathaworn Waenphrom	1:51.411	SF
5	Mongolia (MGL); Khuslenbayar Sainjargal; Rina Batgerel	3:21.933	SF

==== Heat 2 ====
Rank	Team	Time	Notes
1	South Korea (KOR); Choi Min-kyu; Seon Min-ju	1:40.959	FA
2	Kazakhstan (KAZ); Olga Shmelyova; Artyom Terechshenko	1:40.991	FA
3	Japan (JPN); Rin Fukuda; Akihiro Inoue	1:41.202	FA
4	Iran (IRI); Narjes Kargarpoor; Peyman Ghavidel	1:43.614	SF
5	India (IND); Parvathy Geetha; Prasanna Kumar C. S.	1:52.676	SF

=== Semifinal ===
- Qualification: 1–3 → Final (FA)

Rank	Team	Time	Notes
1	Iran (IRI); Narjes Kargarpoor; Peyman Ghavidel	1:48.132	FA
2	India (IND); Parvathy Geetha; Prasanna Kumar C. S.	1:53.031	FA
3	Thailand (THA); Panwad Thongnim; Nathaworn Waenphrom	1:55.896	FA
4	Mongolia (MGL); Khuslenbayar Sainjargal; Rina Batgerel	3:10.038	X

=== Final ===
Rank	Team	Time	Notes
1st place, gold medalist(s)	China (CHN); Li Chenhao; Zhang Luxi	1:39.444	
2nd place, silver medalist(s)	South Korea (KOR); Choi Min-kyu; Seon Min-ju	1:40.349	
3rd place, bronze medalist(s)	Japan (JPN); Rin Fukuda; Akihiro Inoue	1:40.720	
4	Kazakhstan (KAZ); Olga Shmelyova; Artyom Terechshenko	1:41.272	
5	Iran (IRI); Narjes Kargarpoor; Peyman Ghavidel	1:44.415	
6	Vietnam (VIE); Huỳnh Cao Minh; Đỗ Thị Thanh Thảo	1:45.312	
7	Indonesia (INA); Subhi; Stevani Maysche Ibo	1:46.871	
8	Thailand (THA); Panwad Thongnim; Nathaworn Waenphrom	1:47.514	
9	India (IND); Parvathy Geetha; Prasanna Kumar C. S.	1:53.994	
