= Ryokan Kobayashi =

Japanese baseball player

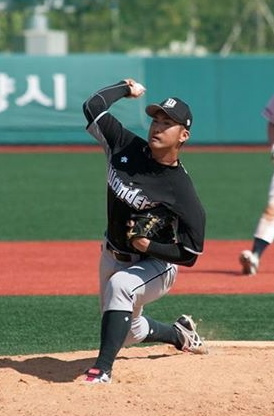
- Pitcher
- Born: April 28, 1979 (age 47); Fukuoka Prefecture, Japan
- Batted: Right Threw: Right

CPBL debut
- March 28, 2008, for the Brother Elephants

Last CPBL appearance
- 2009, for the Brother Elephants

CPBL statistics (through 2009)
- Record: 19-15
- Saves: 1
- Earned run average: 4.06
- Strikeouts: 188
- Stats at Baseball Reference

Teams
- Brother Elephants (2008–2009)

Career highlights and awards
- CPBL: Gold Glove Award (2008)

Ryokan Kobayashi (小林 亮寛, Kobayashi Ryōkan; born April 28, 1979) is a Japanese former professional baseball pitcher. Over his 16-year career, he played professional baseball in Japan, Canada, Taiwan, Mexico, and South Korea. He was used primarily as a starting pitcher.

Kobayashi graduated from famed baseball-focused PL Gakuen High School in Osaka, where he was a teammate of Kosuke Fukudome, who played for the Chicago Cubs in Major League Baseball.

Drafted in the fifth round of the 1997 draft by the Chiba Lotte Marines, Kobayashi played five seasons for their minor league "ni-gun" affiliate, from 1998 to 2002, but his 6.39 ERA prevented him from being promoted to the NPB club. Froom 2003 to 2005, he was on the "team staff" of the Chunichi Dragons, but never appeared in a game.

In 2006, Kobayashi left Japan for Canada to play for the Calgary Vipers of the independent North American League, going 0–2 with a 5.32 ERA for the season.

Returning to Japan in 2007, Kobayashi played for the Kagawa Olive Guyners of the independent Shikoku Island League. Appearing mostly as a reliever, he had a 2.59 ERA in just over 31 innings pitched.

Kobayashi had his greatest success in 2008–2009, playing for the Brother Elephants of the Chinese Professional Baseball League. In 2008 he compiled a 10–6 record, with a 2.66 ERA and 110 strikeouts. He was also the Player of the Month of October 2008. To top it off, he won the 2008 CPBL Gold Glove award.

Kobayashi moved on to Mexico in 2010–2010, first playing for the Chileros de Xalapa and Gallos de Santa Rosa in the Liga Invernal Veracruzana Mexican winter league, and then the Marineros de Ensenada of Liga Norte de México. He was selected to play in the 2011 LNM All-Star Game.

Kobayashi moved to South Korea in 2012 to pitch as a closer for the Goyang Wonders of the KBO Futures League. He played for the Wonders from 2012 to 2013, compiling an 8–5 record with a 2.95 ERA and 17 saves.

After his playing career was over, Kobayashi opened a baseball academy in Fukuoka.

== Career statistics ==
=== NPB Eastern League (Japan) ===
Season	Team	G	W	L	IP	H	BB	HBP	SO	R	ER	ERA	WHIP
1998	Chiba Lotte Marines (AAA)	11	3	2	35	37	14	2	16	16	15	3.86	1.46
1999	Chiba Lotte Marines (AAA)	13	1	1	37.2	39	--	--	22	20	20	4.77	1.03
2000	Chiba Lotte Marines (AAA)	12	1	0	18.1	20	16	2	8	19	17	8.35	1.97
2001	Chiba Lotte Marines (AAA)	24	2	2	55.2	74	30	3	45	48	43	6.95	1.87
2002	Chiba Lotte Marines (AAA)	18	1	2	33.2	41	19	1	11	34	33	8.81	1.78
Total	5 year	78	8	7	180.1	211	79	8	102	137	128	6.39	1.61

=== North American League (Ind. Canadian) ===
Season	Team	G	GS	W	L	IP	H	HR	BB	IBB	HBP	SO	R	ER	ERA	WHIP
2006	Calgary Vipers	40	2	0	2	69.1	76	6	27	3	2	47	47	41	5.32	1.48
Total	1 year	40	2	0	2	69.1	76	6	27	3	2	47	47	41	5.32	1.48

=== Shikoku Island League (Ind. Japan) ===
Season	Team	G	GS	W	L	SV	IP	H	HR	BB	IBB	HBP	SO	R	ER	ERA	WHIP
2007	Kagawa Olive Guyners	15	3	1	2	1	31.1	28	0	3	0	0	--	9	9	2.59	0.99
Total	1 year	15	3	1	2	1	31.1	28	0	3	0	0	--	9	9	2.59	0.99

=== CPBL (Taiwan) ===
Season	Team	G	GS	W	L	IP	SV	CG	SHO	H	HR	BB	IBB	SO	R	ER	ERA	WHIP
2008	Brother Elephants	27	23	10	6	169.0	1	3	1	156	11	42	1	110	61	50	2.66	1.18
2009	Brother Elephants	23	23	9	9	127.2	0	0	0	160	15	45	0	78	101	84	5.92	1.61
Total	2 years	50	46	19	15	296.2	1	3	1	316	26	87	1	188	162	134	4.06	1.36

=== Liga Invernal Veracruzana (Mex. Winter Baseball) ===
Season	Team	DATE
2010	Chileros de Xalapa	NO DATE
2010	Gallos de Santa Rosa	NO DATE

=== Liga Norte de México (Mex.) ===
Season	Team	G	GS	W	L	IP	SV	CG	CGL	SHO	H	HR	BB	IBB	SO	R	ER	ERA	WHIP
2011	Marineros de Ensenada	14	14	6	4	87.2	0	3	1	0	93	6	15	1	69	43	30	3.08	1.23
Total	1 years	14	14	6	4	87.2	0	3	1	0	93	6	15	1	69	43	30	3.08	1.23

=== KBO Futures League (Freedom Division) ===
Season	Team	G	GS	W	L	SV	IP	H	HR	BB	IBB	HBP	SO	R	ER	ERA	WHIP
2012	Goyang Wonders	28	0	4	1	7	81.0	82	7	20	2	4	65	34	33	3.67	1.33
2013	Goyang Wonders	29	0	4	4	10	48.2	42	2	4	3	3	40	16	10	1.85	1.006
Total	2 seasons	57	0	8	5	17	129.2	124	9	24	5	7	105	50	43	2.98	1.141

== See also ==
- Chinese Professional Baseball League
- Brother Elephants
