= Lee Sang-hoon (baseball) =

South Korean baseball player (born 1971)

- Pitcher
- Born: March 11, 1971 (age 55); Seoul, South Korea
- Batted: Left Threw: Left

Professional debut
- KBO: April 10, 1993, for the LG Twins
- NPB: 1998, for the Chunichi Dragons
- MLB: June 29, 2000, for the Boston Red Sox

Last appearance
- NPB: 1999, for the Chunichi Dragons
- MLB: October 1, 2000, for the Boston Red Sox
- KBO: May 18, 2004, for the SK Wyverns

KBO statistics
- Win–loss record: 71–40
- Earned run average: 2.56
- Strikeouts: 781
- Saves: 98

NPB statistics
- Win–loss record: 7–5
- Earned run average: 3.30
- Strikeouts: 98
- Saves: 3

MLB statistics
- Win–loss record: 0–0
- Earned run average: 3.09
- Strikeouts: 6
- Stats at Baseball Reference

Teams
- As player: LG Twins (1993–1997); Chunichi Dragons (1998–1999); Boston Red Sox (2000); LG Twins (2002–2003); SK Wyverns (2004); As coach: Goyang Wonders (2013–2014); Doosan Bears (2014–2015); LG Twins (2016–2018)

Career highlights and awards
- KBO Korean Series champion (1994); KBO Golden Glove Award winner (1995); NPB Central League champion (1999)
Medals
Representing South Korea
Asian Games
Gold medal – first place	2002 Busan	Team

- Lee Sang-hoon
- Hangul: 이상훈
- Hanja: 李尙勳
- RR: I Sanghun
- MR: I Sanghun

Lee Sang-hoon (Korean: 이상훈; Hanja: 李尙勳; Korean pronunciation: [i.saŋ.ɦun]; born March 11, 1971), nicknamed "Samson" for his long hair, is a retired professional baseball player who played in Major League Baseball, Nippon Professional Baseball, and the KBO League.

Lee graduated from Korea University in 1993, and after graduation he joined the LG Twins. Beginning his career as a starting pitcher, his best two years were 1994 and 1995, when he won 18 and 20 games, respectively. His record of 20-5 with a 2.01 ERA, 12 complete games, and 142 strikeouts in 1995 earned him a KBO League Golden Glove Award.

He converted to a closer following the 1995 season.

Lee was posted in 1998, but became the first player whose Korean team rejected the bid for the right to negotiate with him. Lee eventually did make it to the Major Leagues, pitching in nine games for the Boston Red Sox in the 2000 MLB season, recording no decisions and a 3.09 ERA in 11.2 innings pitched.

Lee was at one time the highest-paid player in the KBO after he signed a 600-million-won contract in his second stint with the LG Twins in 2003.

Since his retirement, he has coached in the KBO Futures League and the KBO.
