= Goyang National Baseball Training Stadium =

Baseball stadium in Goyang, South Korea

- Interactive map of Goyang National Baseball Training Stadium
- Location: 2325 Daehwa-dong, Ilsanseo-gu, Goyang, Gyeongi-do, South Korea
- Coordinates: 37°40′52.8″N 126°44′30.0″E
- Owner: City of Goyang
- Operator: Goyang Facility Management Corporation
- Capacity: 1,251
- Surface: Artificial turf
- Field size: Left Field – 98 metres (322 ft); Center – 121 metres (397 ft)

Construction
- Opened: 8 August 2011

Tenants
- Goyang Wonders (2012–2014); Goyang Dinos (2015–present)

Goyang National Baseball Training Stadium (Korean: 고양 국가대표 야구훈련장) is a baseball stadium in Goyang, South Korea. The stadium is used by the Goyang Dinos of the KBO Futures League.

The construction started on December 8, 2009, and was finished on August 8, 2011. It is also a temporary home stadium and club training center for Goyang Dinos.

It is also used as a training ground for the national baseball team of Korea. From 2012 to 2014, it was used as the home stadium of the first independent baseball team in Korea and the training ground for the club.
