= Kia Challengers Field =

Baseball stadium in Hampyeong, South Korea

KIA Challengers Field
- Interactive map of KIA Challengers Field
- Location: Hakgyo-myeon, Hampyeong, Jeollanam-do, South Korea
- Coordinates: 34.991087°N 126.556779°E
- Owner: KIA Tigers
- Operator: Kia Tigers
- Capacity: 50
- Surface: Artificial turf
- Field size: Left Field – 100 metres (328 ft); Center – 120 metres (394 ft)

Construction
- Groundbreaking: October 2010
- Opened: 28 August 2013
- Architect: SUH Architects

Tenant
- Kia Tigers (KBO Futures)

Kia Challengers Field (기아 챌린저스 필드) is a baseball stadium in Hampyeong, South Korea and home to the Kia Tigers (affiliated with the Kia Tigers) and participate in the KBO Futures League.

Throughout 2010 to 2013, the Kia Tigers constructed the Kia Challengers Field with the purpose to develop upcoming athletes, which would strengthen the players in the Kia Tigers team in the KBO League. The new team and stadium would open on July 13, 2016.
