= Kazuhiko Ishimine =

Japanese baseball player (born 1961)

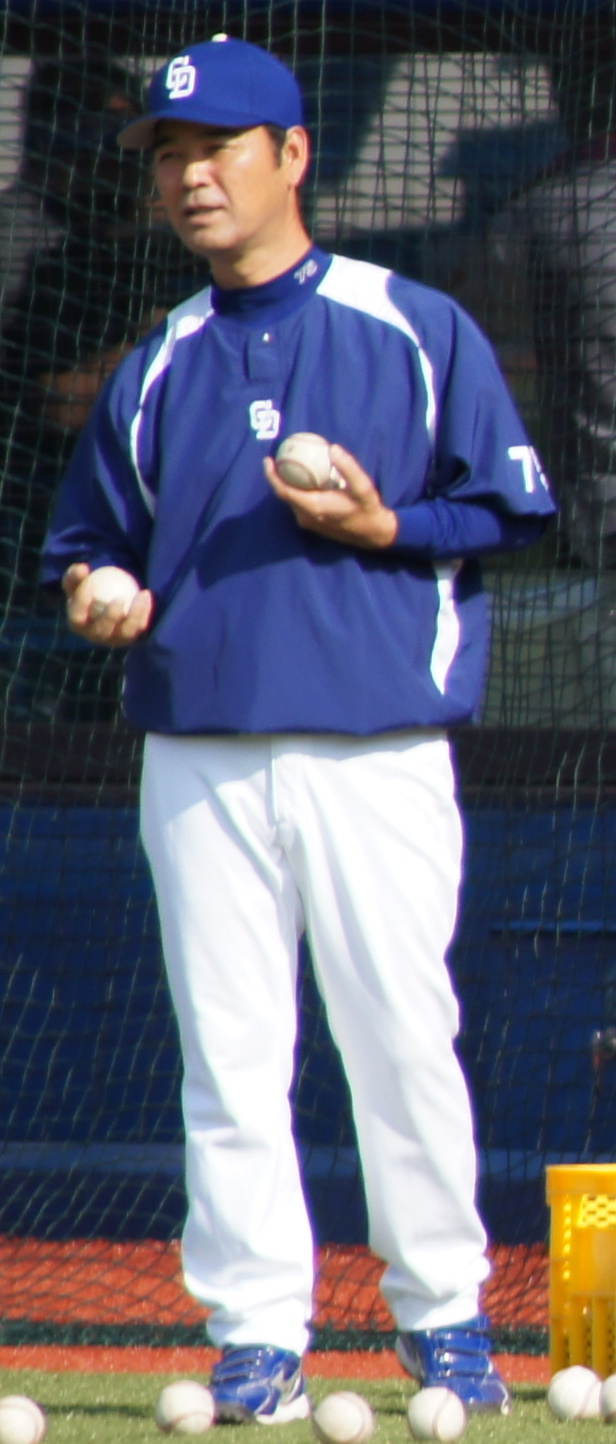
- Outfielder, Designated hitter/ Coach
- Born: January 10, 1961; Naha, Okinawa, Japan
- Batted: Right Threw: Right

NPB debut
- April 6, 1981, for the Hanyu Braves

Last appearance
- October 5, 1996, for the Hanshin Tigers

NPB statistics (through 1996)
- Batting average: .273
- Hits: 1,419
- Home runs: 269
- Runs batted in: 875
- Stolen base: 13
- Stats at Baseball Reference

Teams
- As player: Hanyu Braves / Orix Braves / Orix BlueWave (1979–1993); Hanshin Tigers (1994–1996); As coach: Chunichi Dragons (2018–2011); Yokohama DeNA BayStars (2012); Orix Buffaloes (2013); Goyang Wonders (2014); KT Wiz (2015)

Career highlights and awards
- 1× Leader of RBI in Pacific League (1990); 3× Pacific League Best Nine Award (1986, 1987, 1990); 4× NPB All-Star (1986, 1987, 1990, 1991)

Kazuhiko Ishimine (石嶺 和彦, Ishimine Kazuhiko; born January 10, 1961) is a Japanese former Nippon Professional Baseball outfielder.
