= Goyang Wonders =

Goyang Wonders 고양 원더스
Logo
Cap insignia

Information
- League: Korea Baseball Futures League (2012–2014)
- Ballpark: Goyang Training Stadium (2011–2014)
- Established: December 2011; 14 years ago
- Folded: 2014; 12 years ago
- Nickname: Wonders
- 2014: .613 (43-25-12)
- Colors: Black and silver
- Ownership: Hur Min, We Make Price
- Manager: Kim Sung-keun

Current uniforms
Home	Away

The Goyang Wonders (Korean: 고양 원더스) was a South Korean professional baseball team based in Goyang. They were a member of the unaffiliated Freedom Division of the KBO Futures League, and played games from 2012 to 2014. The team was managed by legendary KBO League manager Kim Sung-keun.

The Goyang Wonders succeeded in producing five players who made it to the top-tier KBO League before they were dissolved in 2014. Altogether, the Wonders produced 23 players who ended up being signed by KBO League franchises.

Kim Sung-keun, fresh off five straight Korean Series appearances with the SK Wyverns, was hired to manage the Wonders in late 2011. Long-time professional pitcher Lee Sang-hoon coached for the Wonders in 2013–2014. Long-time Nippon Professional Baseball outfielder Kazuhiko Ishimine coached for the Wonders in 2014.

The Wonders played 80 unofficial "friendly" games a year against Futures League teams. The franchise continuously applied to become officially part of the Futures League but were never accepted. The team's record during its final season, in 2014, was 43 wins, 25 losses, and 12 draws.

== Notable Goyang Wonders players ==
- Sendy Rleal
- Ryokan Kobayashi
- Shin Seong-hyun
