= Shin Seong-hyun =

South Korean baseball player

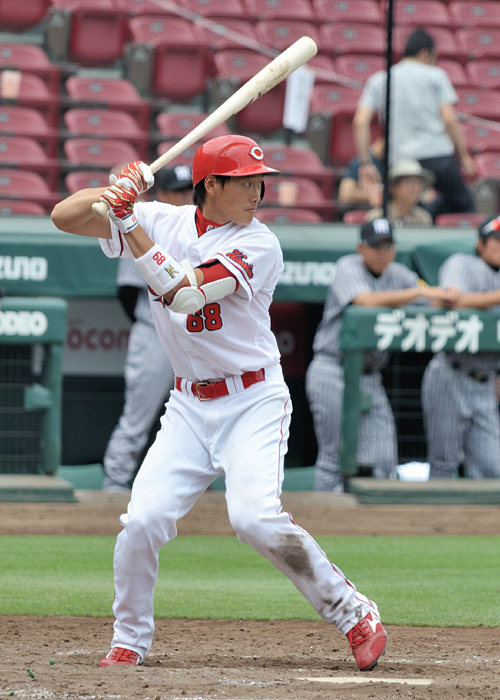
- Infielder
- Born: 19 October 1990 (age 35); Seoul, South Korea
- Batted: Right Threw: Right

KBO debut
- March 30, 2015, for the Hanwha Eagles

Last KBO appearance
- April 28, 2023, for the Doosan Bears

KBO statistics
- Batting average: .217
- Home runs: 16
- Runs batted in: 59
- Stats at Baseball Reference

Teams
- Hiroshima Toyo Carp (2009–2013); Goyang Wonders (2013–2014); Hanwha Eagles (2015–2017); Doosan Bears (2017–2023)

Shin Seong-hyun (Korean: 신성현; Hanja: 申成鉉; born October 19, 1990) is a South Korean infielder who played for the Doosan Bears of the KBO League. He joined the Hanwha Eagles in 2015. He played in the Hanwha Eagles from 2015 to 2017. He transferred baseball team through trade from Hanwha Eagles to Doosan Bears in 2017.
