= Keisuke Kaneko =

Japanese baseball player (born 1985)

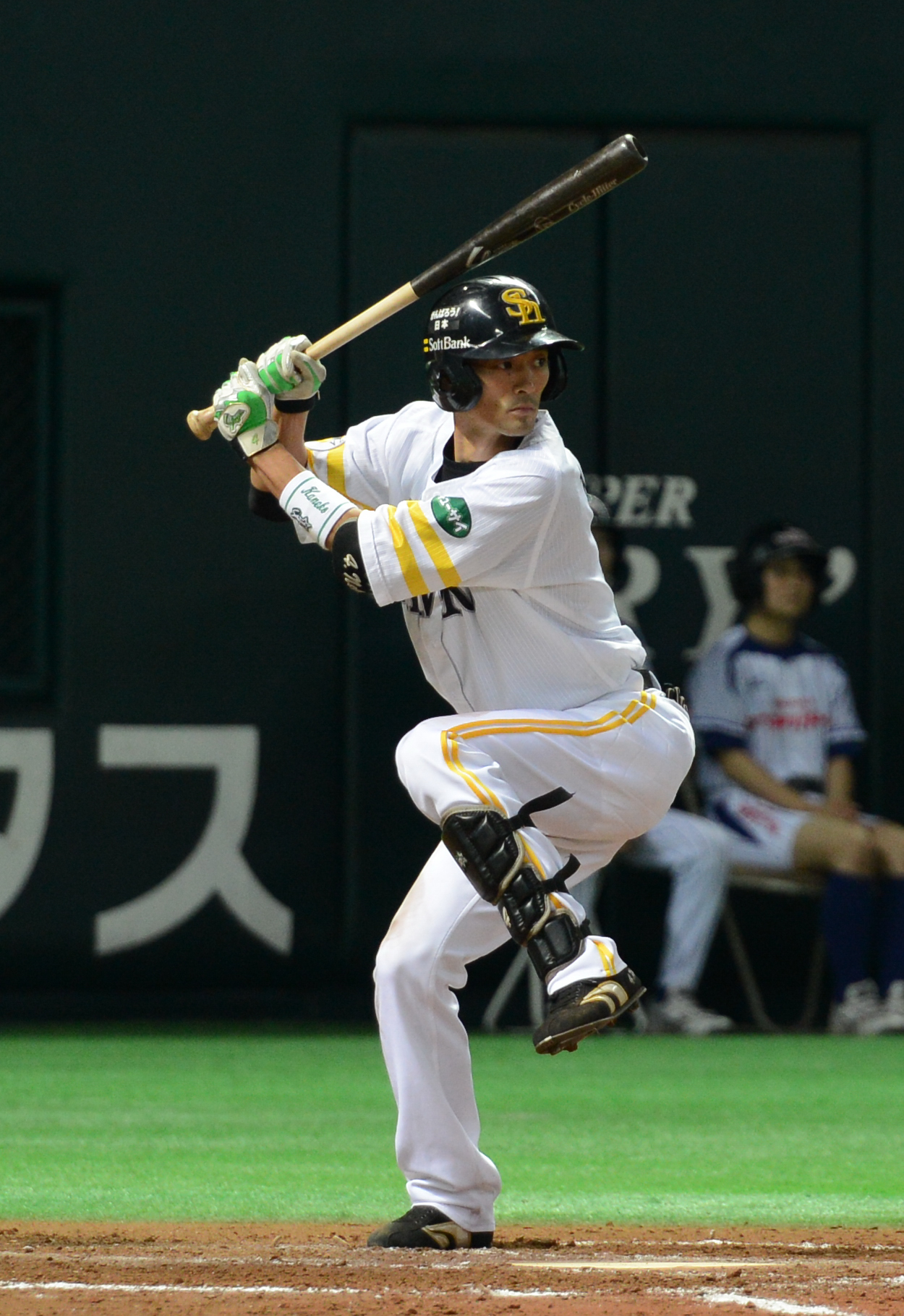
- Kaneko with the Fukuoka SoftBank Hawks.

Fukuoka SoftBank Hawks – No. 91
- Infielder / Coach
- Born: July 23, 1985 (age 40)
- Batted: Right Threw: Right

NPB debut
- 2006, for the Fukuoka SoftBank Hawks

Last NPB appearance
- 2016, for the Fukuoka SoftBank Hawks

NPB statistics
- Batting average: .197
- Home runs: 0
- Run batted in: 17
- Stats at Baseball Reference

Teams
- As player: Fukuoka Daiei Hawks/Fukuoka SoftBank Hawks (2006–2009); Orix Buffaloes (2010–2011); Fukuoka SoftBank Hawks (2012–2016); As coach: Fukuoka SoftBank Hawks (2023–present)

Career highlights and awards
- As coach: Japan Series champion (2025)

Keisuke Kaneko (金子 圭輔, Kaneko Keisuke; born July 23, 1985) is a Japanese former professional baseball infielder, and current third squad inside defense and base running coach for the Fukuoka SoftBank Hawks of Nippon Professional Baseball (NPB). He played in NPH for the Hawks and Orix Buffaloes.

== Professional career ==
=== Active player era ===
==== Fukuoka Daiei / SoftBank Hawks ====
On November 19, 2003, Kaneko was drafted 6th round pick by the Fukuoka Daiei Hawks in the 2003 Nippon Professional Baseball draft.

During Kaneko's first era with the Hawks, he appeared in 32 games in the Pacific League in the 2008 season, but was only able to play in 54 games over six seasons.

On April 30, midway through the 2010 season, Kaneko and Hisao Arakane were traded to the Orix Buffaloes exchange to Takehito Kanazawa.

==== Orix Buffaloes ====
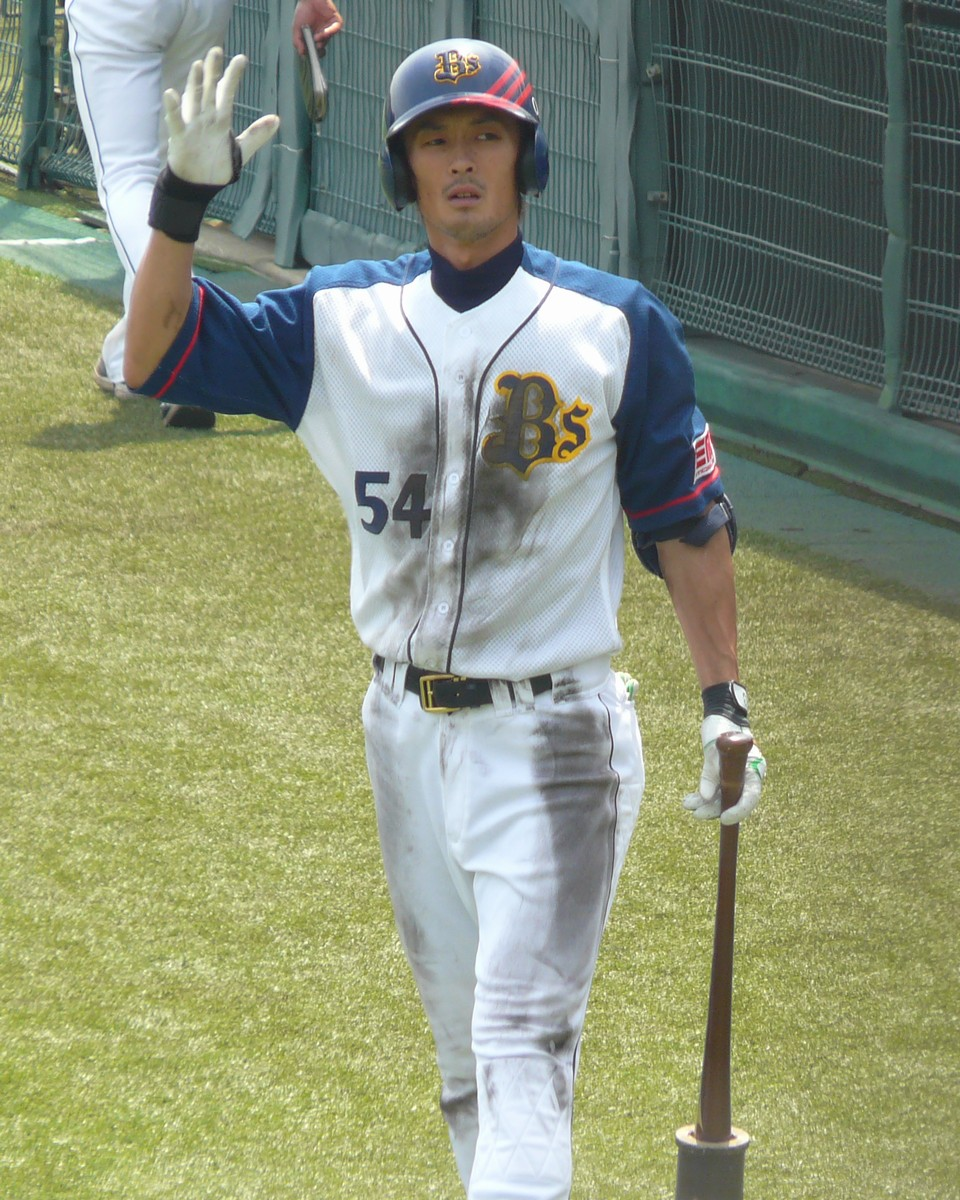
Kaneko with the Orix Buffaloes.

In 2010 season, Kaneko appeared in 31 games and recorded a batting average of .217, two RBIs, and four stolen bases.

On January 24, 2012, after Kaneko played two seasons with the Buffaloes, he returned to the Fukuoka SoftBank Hawks in a trade exchange to Hideaki Takahashi.

==== Fukuoka SoftBank Hawks ====
After returning to the Hawks, Kaneko contributed to the team with his high defensive ability, able to defend all positions in the infield.

He appeared in 157 games from the 2012 - 2016 season, but announced his retirement on November 30, 2016.

Kaneko played 13 seasons, appearing in 253 games and a batting average of .197, a 42 hits, a RBI of 17, a 10 stolen bases, and a 18 sacrifice bunts.

=== After retirement ===
Kaneko worked as a team staff member as a public relations officer for the Fukuoka SoftBank Hawks.

He also served as a leading scorer starting in the 2021 season.

On October 31 2022, The Fukuoka SoftBank Hawks announced that Kaneko will inauguration as coach from the 2023 season.
