= SK Futures Park =

Baseball stadium

- Interactive map of SK Futures Park
- Former names: SK Dream Park
- Location: Gilsang-myeon, Ganghwa, Incheon, South Korea
- Coordinates: 37°38′12.3″N 126°29′58.4″E
- Owner: SK Group
- Operator: SK Wyverns
- Capacity: 500
- Surface: Natural grass
- Field size: Left Field – 98 metres (322 ft); Center – 120 metres (394 ft)

Construction
- Groundbreaking: 8 April 2013
- Opened: 1 April 2015
- Cost: 45 billion won

Tenant
- SK Wyverns (2015–present)

SK Futures Park is a baseball stadium in Incheon, South Korea. The stadium was completed in 2015 and is used by the KBO Futures League team SK Wyverns. The original training stadium of the SK Wyverns was located in the Nam District of Incheon and was named SK Dream Park. It was built in 2001 and demolished in 2006.
