= Sendy Rleal =

Dominican baseball player (born 1980)

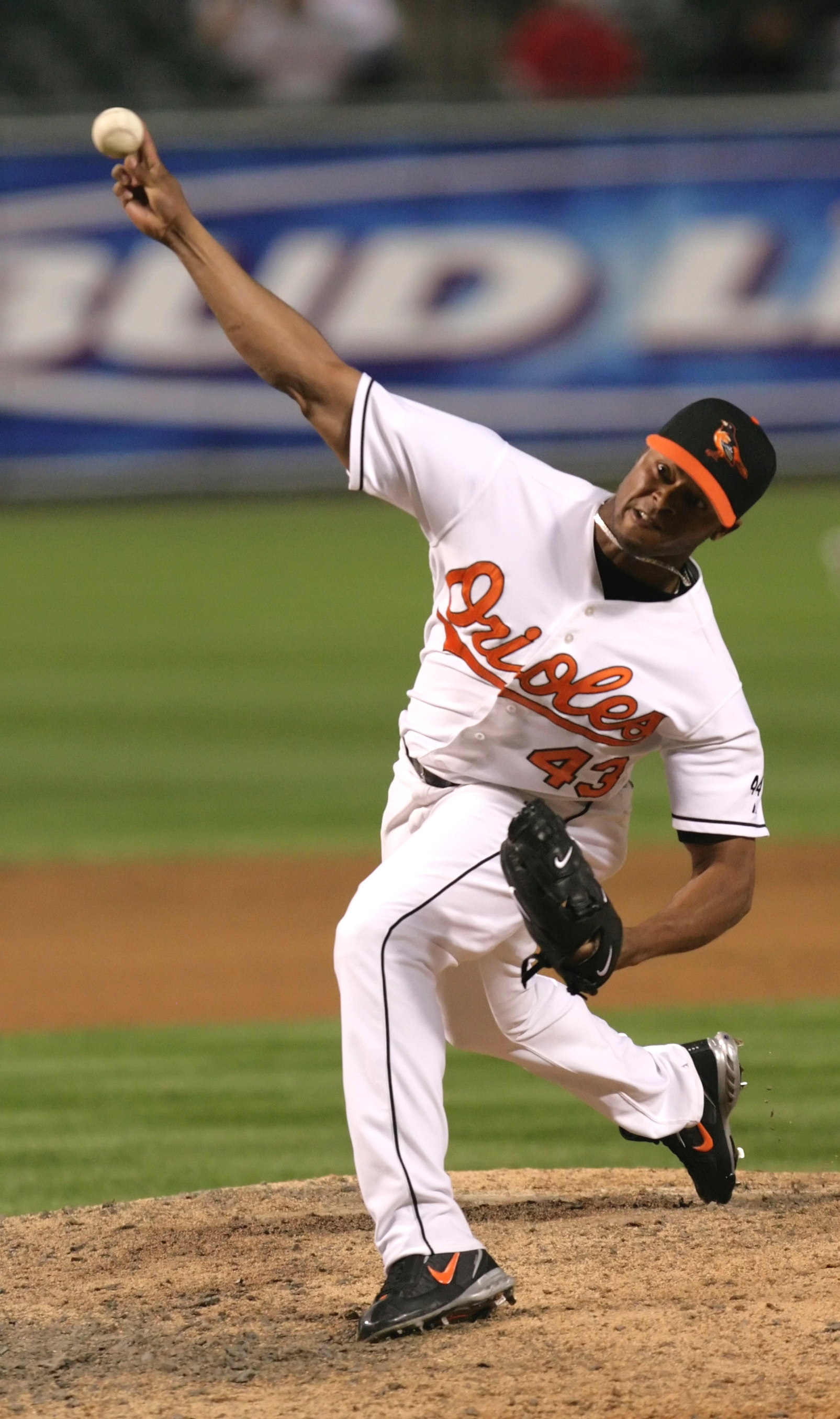
- Rleal with the Baltimore Orioles in 2006
- Relief pitcher
- Born: June 21, 1980 (age 46); San Pedro de Macorís, Dominican Republic
- Batted: Right Threw: Right

Professional debut
- MLB: April 5, 2006, for the Baltimore Orioles
- CPBL: March 28, 2010, for the Sinon Bulls

Last appearance
- MLB: September 27, 2006, for the Baltimore Orioles
- CPBL: March 28, 2010, for the Sinon Bulls

MLB statistics
- Win–loss record: 1–1
- Earned run average: 4.44
- Strikeouts: 19

CPBL statistics
- Win–loss record: 0–0
- Earned run average: 15.43
- Strikeouts: 3
- Stats at Baseball Reference

Teams
- Baltimore Orioles (2006); Sinon Bulls (2010)

Sendy Rleal Aquino (/reɪˈæl/ ray-AL; born June 21, 1980) is a Dominican former professional baseball pitcher. He played in Major League Baseball (MLB) for the Baltimore Orioles in 2006, and in the Chinese Professional Baseball League (CPBL) for the Sinon Bulls in 2010.

== Career ==
In 2007, Rleal pitched in the minor leagues for the Baltimore Orioles' Double-A affiliate, the Bowie Baysox. In 2008, Rleal played with the Lancaster Barnstormers of the Atlantic League of Professional Baseball. He pitched for the Newark Bears of the Atlantic League in 2009. He next pitched for the Petroleros de Minatitlan of the Mexican League in 2011. In May 2012 Rleal pitched for Goyang Wonders in the South Korean Futures League.
