= Kim Sung-keun =

South Korean baseball player (born 1941)

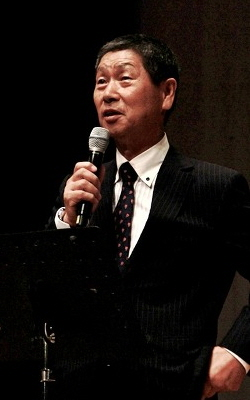
- Manager
- Born: 30 October 1941 (age 85)
- Bats: Left Throws: Left

Teams
- As coach: OB Bears (1982–1983); Haitai Tigers (1994–1995); Samsung Lions (2000); LG Twins (2001); Chiba Lotte Marines (2005–2006); Fukuoka SoftBank Hawks (2022); As manager: Choongam high school (1976-1979); Shinil high school (1979-1981); OB Bears (1984–1988); Pacific Dolphins (1989–1990); Samsung Lions (1991–1992); Ssangbangwool Raiders (1996–1999); LG Twins (2002); SK Wyverns (2007–2011); Goyang Wonders (2012–2014); Hanwha Eagles (2015–2017)

Career highlights and awards
- 3× Korean Series champion (2007, 2008, 2010); 4× KBO Manager of the Year (1986, 2007, 2008, 2010)

- Kim Sung-keun
- Hangul: 김성근
- Hanja: 金星根
- RR: Gim Seonggeun
- MR: Kim Sŏnggŭn

Kim Sung-keun (Korean: 김성근; Hanja: 金星根; born October 30, 1941, in Kyoto, Japan) is a retired South Korean left-handed baseball pitcher and KBO League manager. Over the course of his managerial career, Kim managed seven different KBO League teams, and is only the second manager in the history of the league to record 1,000 victories. He is a four-time KBO Manager of the Year, and as manager of the SK Wyverns led the team to victory in the Korean Series three times. His nickname is the "Baseball God."

== Biography ==
Kim spent his childhood as a resident of Japan and adopted a Japanese name, Seikon Kanebayashi, but remains a Korean citizen, thus making him a Zainichi Korean.

He began in the newly formed KBO as the pitching coach of the OB Bears from 1982 to 1983. Elevated to manager in 1984, Kim managed the Bears through the 1988 season, making the playoffs twice. He was given the KBO Manager of the Year award in 1986. Kim then moved on to the Pacific Dolphins in 1989-1990, where he won his first playoff series in the 1989 season. Kim managed the Samsung Lions in 1991–1992.

After taking a year off, Kim returned to the KBO in 1994–1995 as a coach for the Haitai Tigers. He was re-hired as a manager in 1996, by the Ssangbangwool Raiders, where he lasted until part-way through the 1999 season.

After being fired by the Raiders, Kim returned to the Lions as a coach in 2000, and to the LG Twins in 2001. Elevated to Twins manager in 2002, Kim took the team to his first Korean Series, where they eventually lost to Samsung four-games-to-two.

Kim returned to Japan in 2005–2006 as a coach for Nippon Professional Baseball's Chiba Lotte Marines.

Kim was hired by the SK Wyverns in 2007 and led the team to victories in the 2007, 2008, and 2010 Korean Series. In 2008, Kim reached the 1,000-victory milestone in the KBO League, only the second manager to ever do so. Between 2009 and 2010, the Wyverns had a 23-game winning streak that ended in April 2010.

In 2011, Kim was ousted near the end of the season after a long-standing disagreement between him and the SK front office. This led to bench coach Lee Man-soo taking over the reins – a move that brought a lot of protests from the SK Wyverns fans, as Kim had led SK to the Korean Series in every year that he had been at the helm.

Immediately after leaving the Wyverns, Kim was hired by Hur Min to manage the independent minor league team the Goyang Wonders, which ended up playing in the KBO Futures League. He managed the team for all three seasons of its existence.

After the disbanding of the Wonders, Kim returned to the KBO in 2015 to manage the Hanwha Eagles. He left a game in 2016 due to dizziness. His stint as the Eagles manager did not yield much success — he was fired by the team in May 2017, 43 games into the 2017 season, with a record of 18 wins and 25 losses.

== Controversy ==
In 2002, Kim was fined ₩5,000 during that season for a beanball war that erupted between the Twins and Tigers. (The Tigers' manager was similarly fined.) In 2015, after another beanball incident, "Kim was fined ₩3 million for failing to manage the team properly, the first time in KBO history that only one manager was punished in a beanball incident."

== KBO League managerial record ==
Year	Team	Finish	Games	W	L	D	Win %	Notes
1984	OB Bears	3	100	58	41	1	.585	
1985	OB Bears	4	110	51	57	2	.473	
1986	OB Bears	4	108	56	40	4	.580	Lost Playoff vs. Samsung (2–3)
1987	OB Bears	3	108	54	52	2	.509	Lost Playoff vs. Haitai (2–3)
1988	OB Bears	5	108	54	52	2	.509	
1989	Pacific Dolphins	3	120	62	54	4	.533	Won Semi-Playoffs vs. Samsung (2-1); Lost Playoffs vs. Haitai (0-3)
1990	Pacific Dolphins	5	120	58	59	3	.496	
1991	Samsung Lions	3	126	70	55	1	.560	Won Semi-playoff vs. Lotte (2–1–1); Lost Playoff vs. Eagles (1–3)
1992	Samsung Lions	3	126	67	57	2	.540	Lost Semi-playoff vs. Lotte (0–2)
1996	Ssangbangwool Raiders	3	126	70	54	2	.563	Lost Playoffs to Hyundai (2-3)
1997	Ssangbangwool Raiders	3	126	71	53	2	.571	Lost Semi-Playoffs to Samsung (1-2)
1998	Ssangbangwool Raiders	3	126	58	66	2	.468	
2002	LG Twins	2	133	66	61	6	.520	Won Semi-playoff vs. Hyundai (2–0); Won Playoff vs. Kia (3–2); Lost Korean Series vs. Samsung (2–4)
2007	SK Wyverns	1	126	73	48	5	.603	Won Korean Series vs. Doosan Bears (4–2)
2008	SK Wyverns	1	126	83	43	0	.659	Won Korean Series vs. Doosan Bears (4–1)
2009	SK Wyverns	2	133	80	47	6	.602	Won Playoff vs. Doosan (3–2); Lost Korean Series vs. Kia (3–2)
2010	SK Wyverns	1	133	84	47	2	.632	Won Korean Series vs. Samsung Lions (4–1)
2011	SK Wyverns	3	133	71	59	3	.546	Won Semi-playoff vs. Kia (3–1); Won Playoff vs. Lotte (3–2); Lost Korean Series vs. Samsung (1–4)
2015	Hanwha Eagles	6	144	68	76	0	.472	
2016	Hanwha Eagles	7	144	66	75	3	.469	
2017	Hanwha Eagles	8	43	18	25	0	.431	
Overall record			2511	1,338	1,121	52	.539	Won 3 Korean Series; lost 3 Korean Series
