= Bears Park =

Baseball stadium in Icheon, South Korea

- Interactive map of Bears Park
- Former names: Bears Field (2005–2013)
- Location: 174-3 Gyeongsa-ri, Baeksa-myeon, Icheon, Gyeongi-do, South Korea
- Coordinates: 37°19′53.5″N 127°27′27.2″E
- Owner: City of Icheon
- Operator: Doosan Bears
- Capacity: 400
- Surface: Natural grass
- Field size: Left Field – 100 metres (328 ft); Center Field – 125 metres (410 ft)

Construction
- Opened: 1983
- Renovated: 2005, 2013–2014
- Cost: 55 billion won (2013 reconstruction)

Tenant
- Doosan Bears (KBO Futures)

Bears Park is a baseball stadium in Icheon, South Korea. The stadium is used by the farm team of the Doosan Bears.
