= Sangdong Baseball Stadium =

Baseball stadium in Gimhae, South Korea

Coordinates: 35°13′14.87″N 128°34′51.81″E

Sangdong Baseball Stadium is a baseball stadium in Gimhae, South Korea. The land area totals 135,000 square meters, while the construction of the stadium cost over 25 billion South Korean won. The facilities include the main stadium, the game management hall, the Giants Hall, and the Giants Dome. The left and right fences are 97 meters away from the plate, and the center fence 120 meters away. The stadium complex is currently utilized as the home field of the Lotte Giants in the Korea Baseball Futures League.
