= Tsai Chung-nan =

Taiwanese baseball player

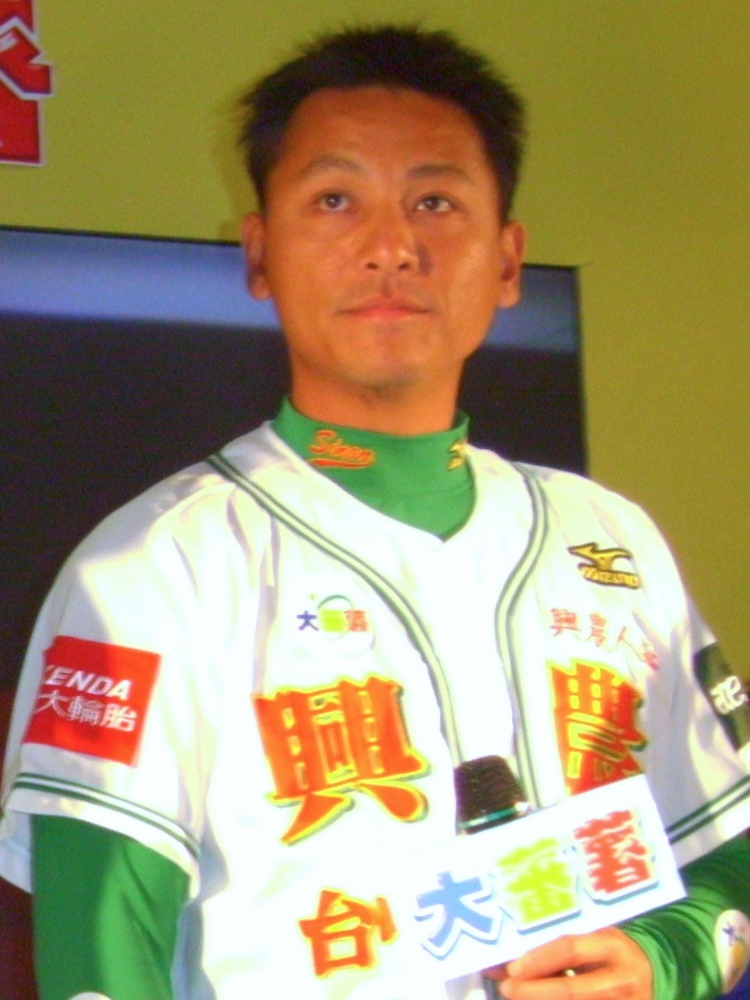
- Pitcher
- Born: 7 March 1979 (age 46); Xizhi, Taipei County, Taiwan
- Bats: Right Throws: Right

CPBL debut
- March 8, 2002, for the Sinon Bulls

CPBL statistics (through 10 October 2008)
- Win–loss record: 35–28
- Earned run average: 3.98
- Strikeouts: 304

Teams
- As player: Sinon Bulls (2002–2009); As coach: Sinon Bulls pitching coach (2011–2012); EDA Rhinos pitching coach (2012–?); Nanhua University head coach (2016–present)

Career highlights and awards
- CPBL Rookie of the Year (2002)
Medals
Representing Chinese Taipei
Men's baseball
Asian Games
Silver medal – second place	2002 Busan	Team

Tsai Chung-nan (Chinese: 蔡仲南; Wade–Giles: Tsai^{4} Chung^{4}-nan^{2}; born 7 March 1979 in Taipei County, Taiwan), sometimes nicknamed Ah-Gan (Chinese: 阿甘), is a Taiwanese former baseball starting pitcher who played for the Sinon Bulls in Taiwan's Chinese Professional Baseball League (CPBL) from 2002 to 2009. He is currently the head coach for the Nanhua University baseball team.

== Early life and education ==
Born in Xizhi Township, Taipei County, Tsai attended Xizhi Elementary School and Xiufeng Senior High School prior to entering Taipei Physical Education College, a junior college in Taipei. He joined the Taiwanese military as part of Taiwan's compulsory service.

== Playing career ==
In 1999, Tsai represented Taiwan and faced off against Japanese ace Daisuke Matsuzaka in the 1999 Asian Baseball Championship, becoming a household name. In the 2001 Baseball World Cup, he recorded a win against the Netherlands and led the team to the semifinals.

In discontinued magazine Baseball World's October 1999 issue, Tsai was featured in the cover story and dubbed the "Prince of the Forkball." The cover bore, in large English lettering, "Now You Know Who I Am!" After Tsai’s performance in the Asian Baseball Championship, he was recruited by or in dialogue with Nippon Professional Baseball, Taiwan Major League, and CPBL teams.

Tsai was the No. 1 overall pick by the Sinon Bulls in the 2002 CPBL draft, signing a historic NT$6 million contract. In his rookie season, Tsai posted 14 wins and 9 losses with a 3.49 earned run average, receiving the CPBL Rookie of the Year Award.

Tsai represented Taiwan in the 2002 Asian Games held in Busan, South Korea. He was the team's ace pitcher, and recorded a loss in the championship game against the South Korean team.

In his second year in the CPBL, he posted 11 wins.

== Coaching career ==
Following his playing career, Tsai became pitching coach for the Simon Bulls. During his injury-ridden years, he was reportedly encouraged by the Bulls organization to transition into a coaching role.

In October 2016, Nanhua University announced the establishment of its baseball team and hired Tsai to be its first head coach.

== Personal life ==
Tsai's nickname Ah-Gan is derived from the Taiwanese translation of film character Forrest Gump. His classmates at junior college coined the nickname based on anecdotes that Tsai often continued running after the team's conditioning drills had ended.
