= Tsai Feng-an =

Taiwanese baseball player

- First baseman
- Born: November 20, 1975 (age 50)
- Bats: Right Throws: Right

CPBL statistics
- Batting average: .262
- Home runs: 71
- Runs batted in: 369
- Stats at Baseball Reference

Teams
- Mercuries Tigers (1997–1999); Brother Elephants (2000–2006)

Tsai Feng-an (born 20 November 1975) is a Taiwanese baseball player who competed in the 2004 Summer Olympics.
