= Kazunari Tsuruoka =

Japanese baseball player and coach (born 1977)

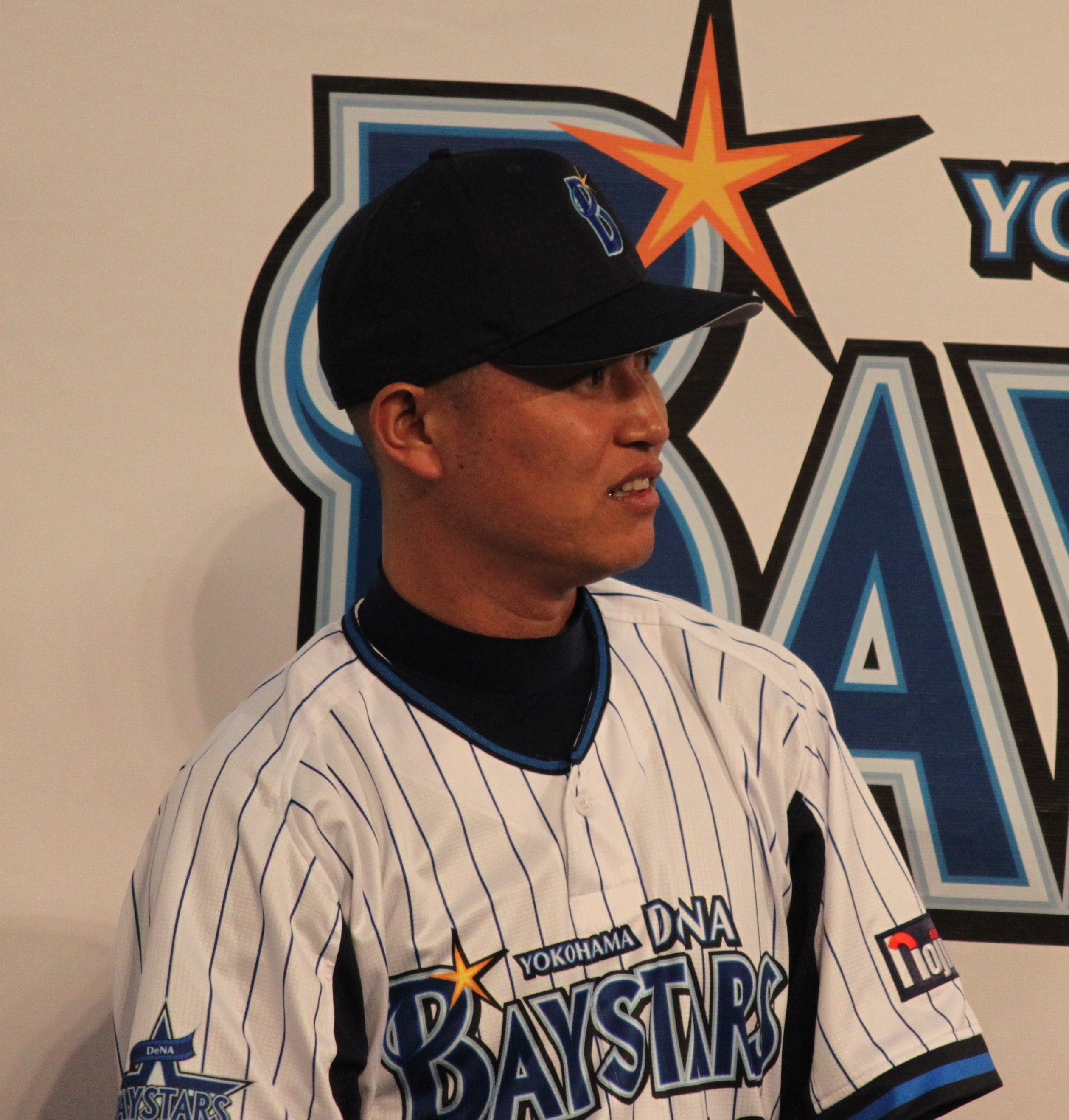
- Tsuruoka with the Yokohama DeNA BayStars

Hanwha Eagles – No. 70
- Catcher / Coach
- Born: May 30, 1977 (age 48); Takasago, Hyōgo, Japan
- Batted: Right Threw: Right

NPB debut
- September 1, 2000, for the Yokohama BayStars

Last NPB appearance
- September 18, 2016, for the Yokohama BayStars

NPB statistics
- Batting average: .235
- Home runs: 18
- Runs batted in: 140
- Stats at Baseball Reference

Teams
- As player: Yokohama BayStars (1996–2008); Yomiuri Giants (2008–2011); Yokohama DeNA BayStars (2012–2013); Hanshin Tigers (2014–2016); As coach: Chiba Lotte Marines (2017–2018); Yokohama DeNA BayStars (2019–2024); Hanwha Eagles (2025–present)

Kazunari Tsuruoka (鶴岡 一成, Tsuruoka Kazunari; born May 30, 1977) is a Japanese former professional baseball player. He played catcher.
