= Kanehisa Arime =

Japanese baseball player (born 1978)

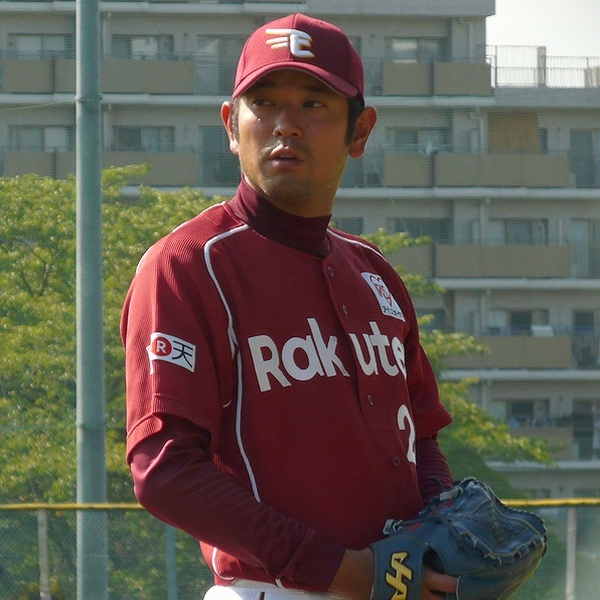
- Pitcher / Coach
- Born: September 27, 1978 (age 48); Naha, Okinawa, Japan
- Batted: left Threw: left

NPB debut
- July 18, 2003, for the Osaka Kintetsu Buffaloes

Last NPB appearance
- June 5, 2012, for the Tohoku Rakuten Golden Eagles

NPB statistics
- Win–loss record: 9–34
- Earned run average: 4.53
- Strikeouts: 394

Teams
- As player: Osaka Kintetsu Buffaloes (2002–2004); Tohoku Rakuten Golden Eagles (2005–2012); As coach: Tohoku Rakuten Golden Eagles (2025)

Kanehisa Arime (有銘 兼久, Arime Kanehisa; born September 27, 1978) is a Japanese Nippon Professional Baseball pitcher.
