= Kim Jin-woo (baseball) =

South Korean baseball player

- Starting pitcher
- Born: March 7, 1983 (age 42)
- Bats: Right Throws: Right

KBO debut
- 2002, for the Kia Tigers

KBO statistics (through 2015)
- Win–loss record: 70-54
- Saves: 6
- Earned run average: 3.93
- Strikeouts: 925

Teams
- Kia Tigers (2002–2007, 2011–2017)

Kim Jin-woo (Korean: 김진우; Hanja: 金珍友; born March 7, 1983, in Gwangju, South Korea) is a right-handed starting pitcher who played for the Kia Tigers from 2002 to 2007, then from 2011 to 2017. He also participated in the 2002 Asian Games for South Korea.

== Filmography ==
=== Television show ===
Year	Title	Role	Notes	Ref.
2022	Over the Top	Contestant		
