= Jong Hyun-wook =

South Korean baseball player (born 1978)

Jong Hyun-Wook
- Relief pitcher
- Born: December 2, 1978 (age 47)
- Batted: Right Threw: Right

KBO debut
- September 2, 1998, for the Samsung Lions

Last KBO appearance
- 2016, for the LG Twins

KBO statistics
- Win–loss record: 51–44
- Earned run average: 3.80
- Strikeouts: 641
- Stats at Baseball Reference

Teams
- As a player: Samsung Lions (1998–2000, 2002–2004, 2007–2012); LG Twins (2013–2014, 2016); As a coach: Samsung Lions (2017–2024)
Medals
Men's baseball
World Baseball Classic
| Silver medal – second place | 2009 Los Angeles | Team |

Jong Hyun-Wook (Korean: 정현욱; Hanja: 鄭現旭; born December 2, 1978, in Goryeong, North Gyeongsang Province, South Korea), nicknamed "Slave Jong (정노예)", is a former South Korean relief pitcher in the KBO League.

== Amateur career ==
Jong attended Dongdaemoon Commerce High School in Seoul, South Korea. In 1995, he was selected to the South Korea national junior team, and participated in the 1995 World Junior Baseball Championship in Boston, United States, along with future Major League pitchers Kim Sun-Woo, Seo Jae-Weong and Kim Byung-Hyun.

=== Notable international careers ===
| Year | Venue | Competition | Team | Individual note |
|---|---|---|---|---|
| 1995 | United States | World Junior Baseball Championship | 4th | |

== Professional career ==
Signed by the Samsung Lions in January 1998, he temporarily left the Samsung Lions for the two-year military service In the 2005 season, and returned to the team in August 2007.

Many baseball fans describe him as a "whatever-is-needed utility pitcher" because of his ability to fill in as a starting pitcher or relief pitcher as needed. In the 2008 season, Jong took a role as a utility pitcher for the Lions, pitching 127 innings in 53 games, starting 7, going 10–4 with an ERA of 3.40 and 11 holds in the process. His 3.40 ERA ranked 9th in the league, pitching over the required innings to qualify for the ERA title.

After the 2008 season, Jong was called up to the South Korea national baseball team for the 2009 World Baseball Classic. Although Jong was expected to garner nothing but mopup duties for the team, he was brought up in the five critical games as a long reliever because of the multiple injuries to the South Korea's bullpen. He emerged as a WBC relief hero, going 1–0 with a 1.74 ERA and 13 strikeouts in 10.1 innings pitched. He tied for third in the Classic in strikeouts. In Round 2, he silenced the Mexican bats, earning the win with two strikeouts and allowing only a hit in 2.2 innings pitched. Jong appeared in the semifinal game against Venezuela, and pitched a 1.1 inning no-hitter, striking out MLB All-Star sluggers Melvin Mora, Carlos Guillén and Magglio Ordóñez.

In the 2009 KBO season, Jong appeared in 62 games, taking a role as a utility pitcher and posting 8 wins, 6 saves and 16 holds. He was pitching a 2.20 ERA for a 5–4 record in 65.1 innings before the All-Star break, but his stats dipped in the second half of the season due to arm fatigue and he finished the year with a 3.42 ERA.

=== Notable international careers ===
| Year | Venue | Competition | Team | Individual note |
|---|---|---|---|---|
| 2009 | United States | World Baseball Classic | Silver medal | 1-0, 1.74 ERA (5 G, 10.1 IP, 2 ER, 13 K) |

== Personal life ==
He is widely known as "Slave Jong" because of him being used as a starter and a long reliever in his team. Due to his good performance in the 2009 World Baseball Classic, many netizens in South Korea called him "Guk-no" which means "national slave".
