= 2009 World Baseball Classic championship =

Baseball game in Los Angeles

2009 World Baseball Classic Final
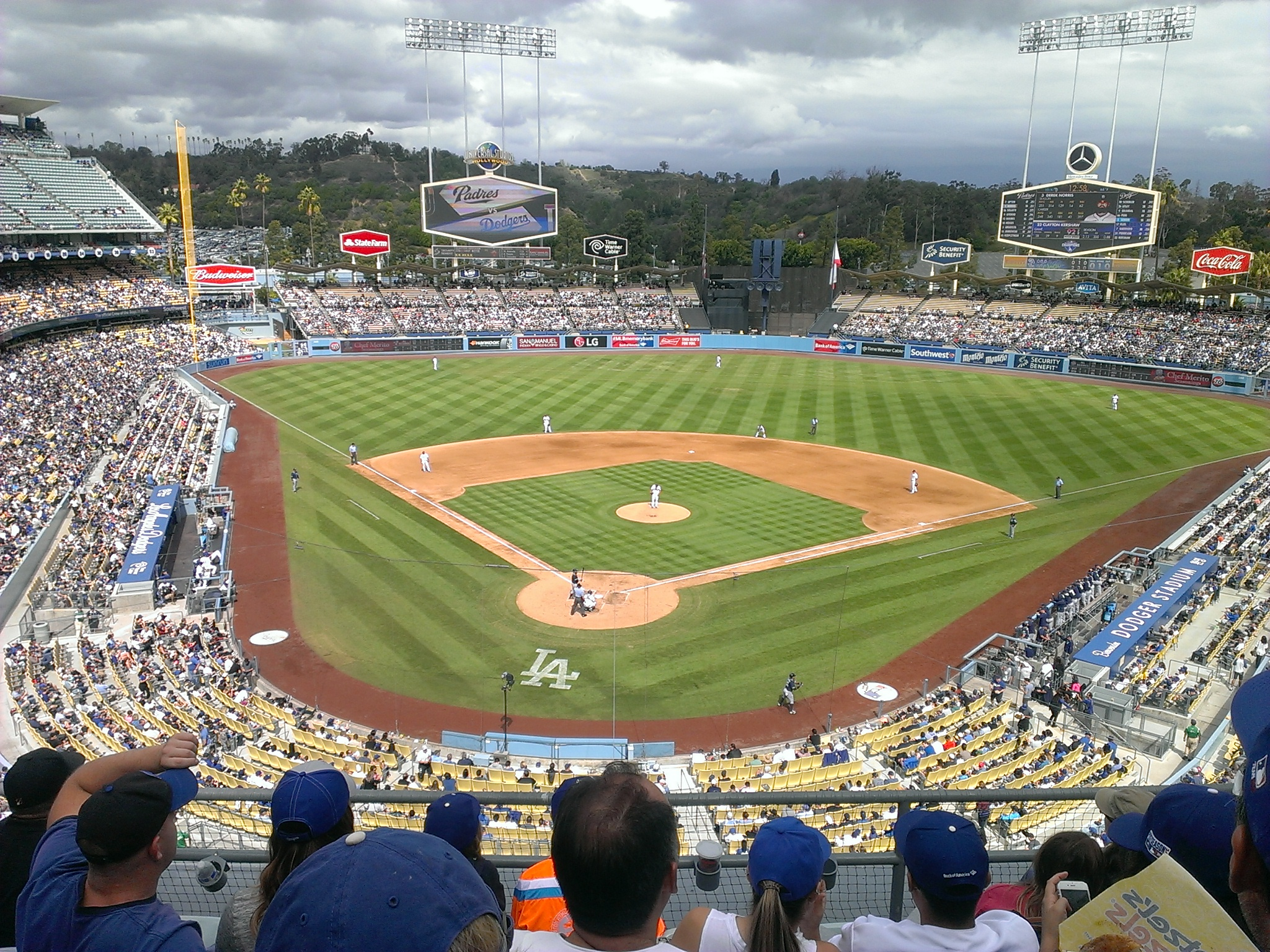
- Dodger Stadium, Los Angeles
Japan	South Korea
(Japan)	(South Korea)
5	3
- Ended after the 10th inning Japan scored 2–0 in extra innings
	1	2	3	4	5	6	7	8	9	10	R	H	E
Japan	0	0	1	0	0	0	1	1	0	2	5	15	0
South Korea	0	0	0	0	1	0	0	1	1	0	3	5	1
- Date: March 23, 2009
- Venue: Dodger Stadium
- City: Los Angeles, California, U.S.
- Managers: Tatsunori Hara (Japan); Kim In-sik (South Korea)
- Umpires: HP: (United States) Derryl Cousins; 1B: (Puerto Rico) Carlos Rey; 2B: (United States) Ron Kulpa; 3B: (Puerto Rico) Willie Rodriguez; LF: (United States) Paul Emmel; RF: (Australia) Paul Hyham
- MVP: Daisuke Matsuzaka (Japan)
- Attendance: 54,846
- Time of game: 6:39 p.m. PDT
- Television: Multiple
- Radio: Multiple

The championship round for the 2009 World Baseball Classic was held at Dodger Stadium in Los Angeles, California, United States, from March 21 to 23, 2009.

The championship round was decided in two semi final games and a final game. In the final, the team with the higher winning percentage of games in the tournament were to be the home team. If the teams competing in the final had identical winning percentages in the tournament, then World Baseball Classic, Inc. (WBCI) would conduct a coin flip or draw to determine the home team.

== Bracket ==
Semifinals
1R	South Korea	10
2W	Venezuela	2
2R	United States	4
1W	Japan	9

Final
SF1W	South Korea	3
SF2W	Japan	5

== Results ==
- All times are Pacific Daylight Time (UTC−07:00).

=== Semifinal 1 − South Korea 10, Venezuela 2 ===
March 21 18:00 at Dodger Stadium
Team	1	2	3	4	5	6	7	8	9	R	H	E
South Korea	5	2	0	1	0	2	0	0	0	10	10	1
Venezuela	0	0	1	0	0	0	1	0	0	2	9	5
WP: Suk-min Yoon (2−0) LP: Carlos Silva (1−1); Home runs: KOR: Shin-Soo Choo (1), Tae-kyun Kim (1); VEN: Carlos Guillén (1); Attendance: 43,378 (77.5%); Umpires: HP − Ron Kulpa, 1B − Willie Rodriguez, 2B − Paul Emmel, 3B − Paul Hyham, LF − Derryl Cousins, RF − Carlos Rey; Boxscore

=== Semifinal 2 − Japan 9, United States 4 ===
March 22 17:00 at Dodger Stadium
Team	1	2	3	4	5	6	7	8	9	R	H	E
United States	1	0	1	0	0	0	0	2	0	4	9	3
Japan	0	1	0	5	0	0	0	3	X	9	10	1
WP: Daisuke Matsuzaka (3−0) LP: Roy Oswalt (1−1); Home runs: USA: Brian Roberts (1); JPN: None; Attendance: 43,630 (77.5%); Umpires: HP − Paul Emmel, 1B − Paul Hyham, 2B − Derryl Cousins, 3B − Carlos Rey, LF − Ron Kulpa, RF − Willie Rodriguez; Boxscore

=== Final − Japan 5, South Korea 3 ===
March 23 18:00 at Dodger Stadium
Team	1	2	3	4	5	6	7	8	9	10	R	H	E
Japan	0	0	1	0	0	0	1	1	0	2	5	15	0
South Korea	0	0	0	0	1	0	0	1	1	0	3	5	1
WP: Yu Darvish (2-1) LP: Chang-yong Lim (0−1); Home runs: JPN: None; KOR: Shin-Soo Choo (1); Attendance: 54,846 (97.9%); Umpires: HP − Derryl Cousins, 1B − Carlos Rey, 2B − Ron Kulpa, 3B − Willie Rodriguez, LF − Paul Emmel, RF − Paul Hyham; Boxscore

South Korea won the coin flip held after the second semifinal between Japan and the United States, designating them as the home team for the final.

Japan drew first blood, scoring on a RBI single by Michihiro Ogasawara in the third inning. Shin-Soo Choo tied the score 1−all with a home run in the fifth inning. With runners on first and third, Hiroyuki Nakajima hit an RBI single to bring Seiichi Uchikawa home to give Japan the lead 2−1. South Korea failed to take advantage of Japanese pitcher Hisashi Iwakuma, who was visibly tired, when they failed to score in the seventh inning, when Iwakuma was relieved by Toshiya Sugiuchi after two outs. Uchikawa hit a single to start the eighth. Atsunori Inaba scored a double to put Uchikawa in scoring position, and Uchikawa scored on Akinori Iwamura's sacrifice fly. Hyun-wook Jong retired the remaining batters to close out the inning.

Japan brought out their closer, Yu Darvish, for the bottom of the ninth with a 3−2 lead. Darvish struck out Keun-woo Jeong, but walked Hyun-soo Kim and Tae-kyun Kim to put South Koreans on first and second with one out. Darvish then struck out Choo and was one out away from saving the game. But Bum-ho Lee singled, driving in Jong-wook Lee for the game-tying run to make it 3–all and send the game into extra innings.

Japan batted first, with Chang-yong Lim pitching for South Korea in the tenth. Uchikawa and Iwamura hit a single to put runners on first and third with two out. Ichiro was one strike away from ending the inning when he hit a line-drive single up the middle that scored Iwamura and Uchikawa. Lim then hit Nakajima with a pitch and intentionally walked Norichika Aoki to face Kenji Johjima who was hitless up to that point. Lim was able to strikeout Johjima and send the game to the bottom of the tenth. Darvish made short work of South Korea, capping with a strikeout of Keun-woo Jeong to clinch Japan's successful defense of their 2006 championship.

Japan's Daisuke Matsuzaka was awarded the tournament MVP for the second consecutive time, with a 3−0 record and 2.45 ERA.
