= Yang Sung-hsien =

Taiwanese baseball player

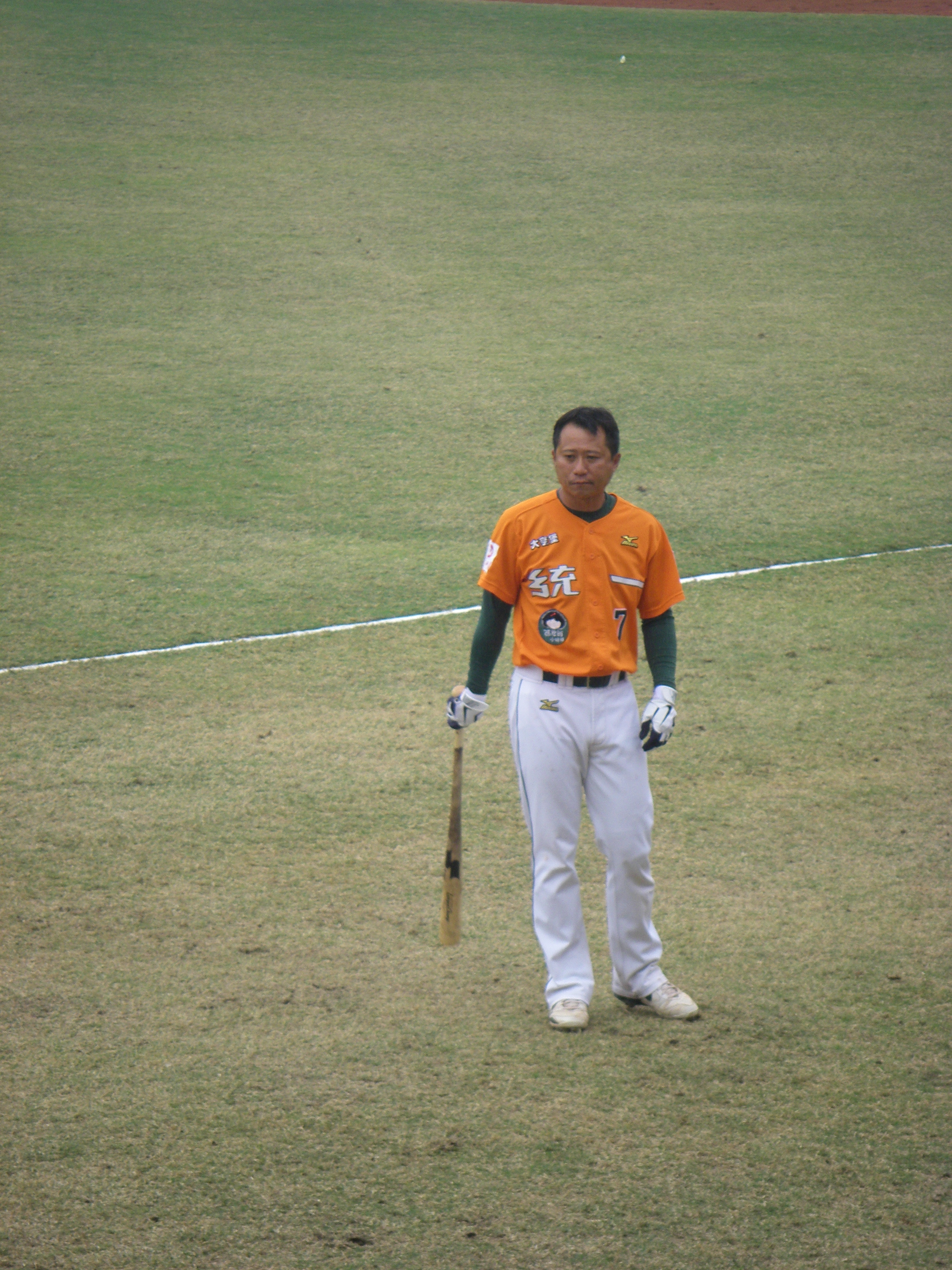

Uni-President 7-Eleven Lions – No. 7
- Center field
- Born: October 6, 1977 (age 48)
- Bats: Left Throws: Left

debut
- July 9, 1999, for the Chinatrust Whales

Career statistics (through June 7, 2008)
- Games: 537
- Batting average: 0.306
- Hits: 538
- Home runs: 18
- RBIs: 153
- Stolen bases: 104
- Stats at Baseball Reference

Teams
- Chinatrust Whales (1999–2003)

Yang Sung-hsien (simplified Chinese: 杨松弦; traditional Chinese: 楊松弦; pinyin: Yáng Sōngxián, born October 6, 1977) is a Taiwanese baseball player who currently plays for Uni-President 7-Eleven Lions of Chinese Professional Baseball League. He currently plays as left fielder for the Lions. Yang was banned from playing in CPBL for protesting the Chinatrust Whales' management in 2003. The ban was lifted in 2005 with the helps of Uni-President Lions, La New Bears, and Chinatrust Whales under a new general manager; the three organization contested the 2003 decision of the league, and successfully lifted the ban.

== See also ==
- Chinese Professional Baseball League
- Uni-President Lions
