= Seosan Baseball Training Center =

Baseball park in Seosan, South Korea

- Interactive map of Seosan Baseball Training Center
- Full name: Seosan Hanwha Eagles Baseball Training Center
- Location: Seosan, South Chungcheong, South Korea
- Coordinates: 36°49′25″N 126°27′19″E
- Owner: Hanwha Eagles
- Operator: Hanwha Eagles
- Capacity: 780
- Surface: ExcelTurf
- Field size: Left Field – 100 metres (328 ft); Center – 120 metres (394 ft)
- Acreage: Total – 36,363.75 m^{2} (8.99 acres)

Construction
- Groundbreaking: December 2011
- Opened: November 2012
- Cost: 30 billion won
- Architects: Gansam Architect & Partners

Tenant
- Hanwha Eagles

Seosan Baseball Training Center is a baseball park and accompanying facilities of Hanwha Eagles in Seosan, South Korea, opened in November, 2012. Located in Seosan Techno Valley area, the training center has one full-scale ballpark with 1,500 seating capacity for second-string team matches, smaller training fields and rehabilitation facilities. It serves as home for the second-string team of Hanwha Eagles and rehabilitation center for injured players.
