= Hisao Arakane =

Japanese baseball player (born 1978)

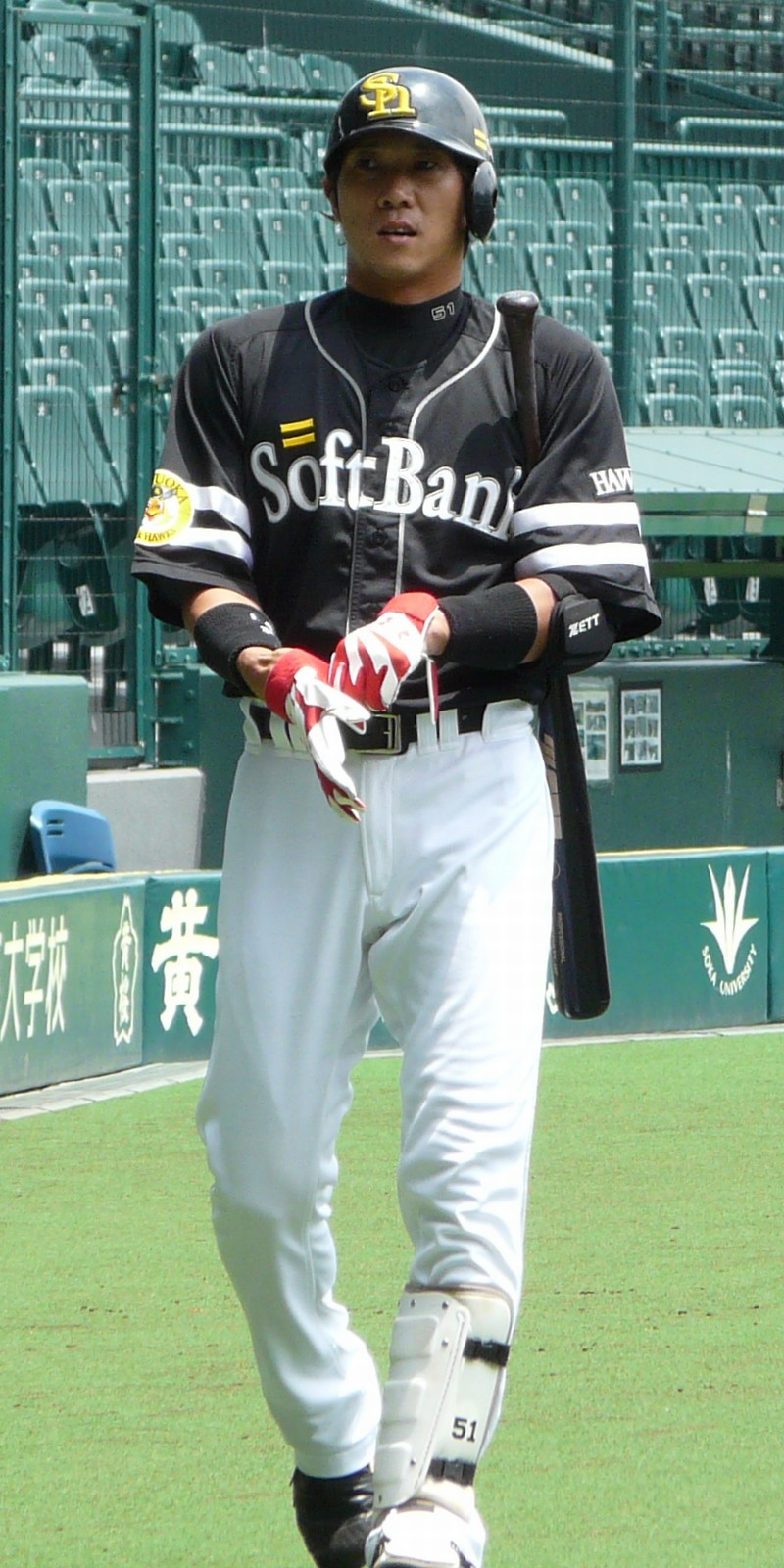
- Arakane with the Fukuoka SoftBank Hawks.

Fukuoka SoftBank Hawks – No. 023
- Outfielder / Coach
- Born: August 1, 1978 (age 48); Beppu, Ōita, Japan
- Batted: Right Threw: Right

NPB debut
- September 30, 2001, for the Fukuoka Daiei Hawks

Last NPB appearance
- May 19, 2012, for the Orix Buffaloes

NPB statistics
- Batting average: .230
- Hits: 148
- Home runs: 10
- Run batted in: 55
- Stats at Baseball Reference

Teams
- As player: Fukuoka Daiei Hawks/Fukuoka SoftBank Hawks (2001–2010); Orix Buffaloes (2010–2012); As coach: Fukuoka SoftBank Hawks (2024–present)

Career highlights and awards
- As coach: Japan Series champion (2025)

Hisao Arakane (荒金 久雄, Arakane Hisao; born August 1, 1978) is a Japanese former professional baseball outfielder, and current fourth squad fielder supervisor and defense and base running coordinator for the Fukuoka SoftBank Hawks of Nippon Professional Baseball (NPB).

He played in NPB for the Fukuoka Daiei Hawks, and Orix Buffaloes.

== Early baseball career ==
Arakane went on to PL Gakuen High School and participated the 78rd Japanese High School Baseball Championship in the summer of his junior year.

He also went on to Aoyama Gakuin University, where he won the 1999 Japan National Collegiate Baseball Championship.

== Professional career ==
=== Active player era ===
==== Fukuoka Daiei / SoftBank Hawks ====
On November 17, 2000, Arakane was drafted fifth round pick by the Fukuoka Daiei Hawks in the 2000 Nippon Professional Baseball draft.

In 2004 season, Arakane appeared in 74 games and recorded a batting average of .213, a 3 home runs, and a 15 RBIs.

During Arakane's era with the Hawks, he appeared in 284 games in the Pacific League in nine seasons.

On April 30, midway through the 2010 season, Arakane and Keisuke Kaneko were traded to the Orix Buffaloes exchange to Takehito Kanazawa.

==== Orix Buffaloes ====
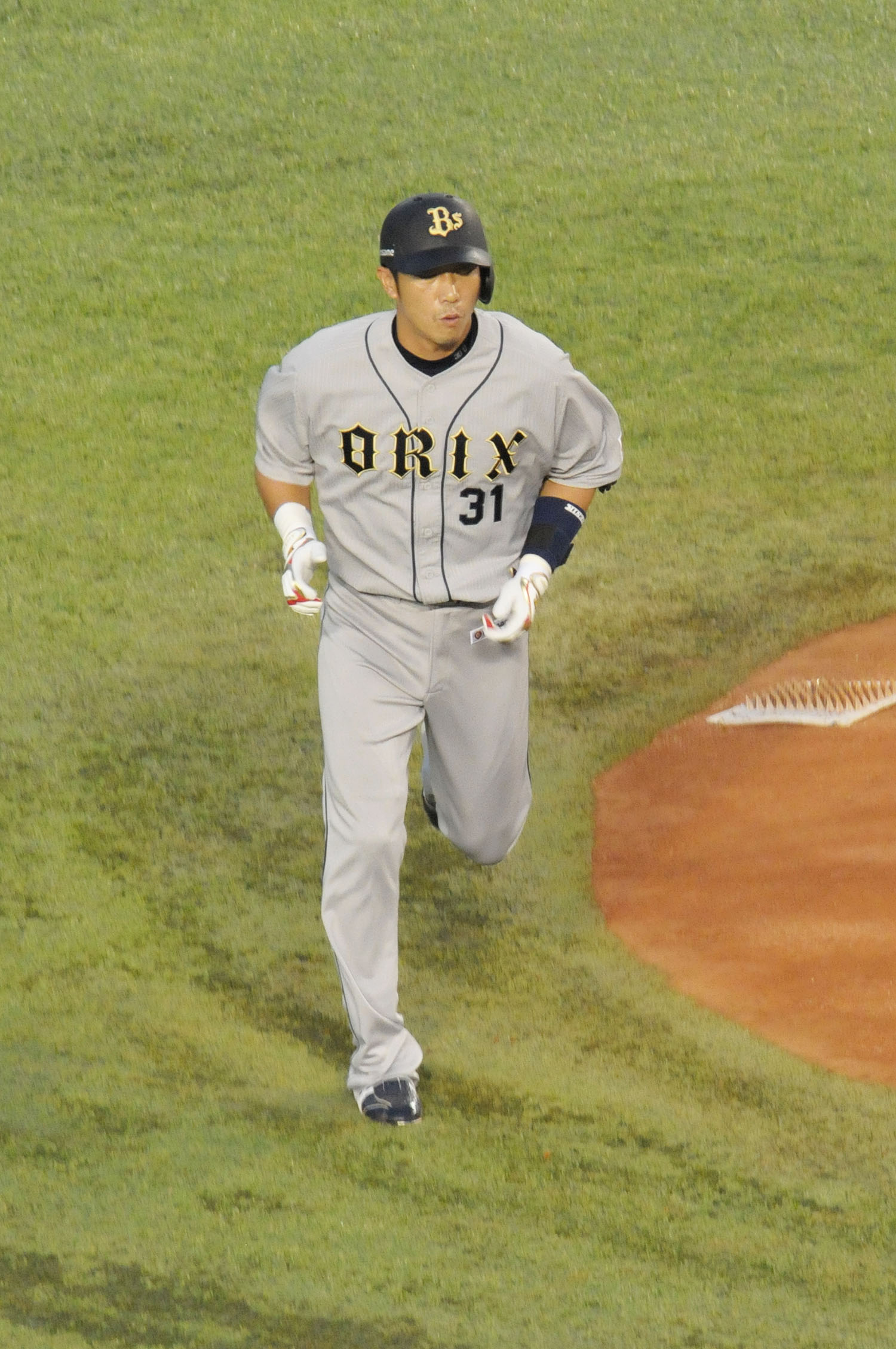
Arakane with the Orix Buffaloes.

In 2010 season, Arakane appeared in 64 games and recorded a batting average of .269, 3 home runs, and a 16 RBIs.

He played three seasons with the Buffaloes before retiring after the 2012 season.

Arakane played 12 seasons, appearing in 389 games and a batting average of .230, a 148 hits, a 10 home runs, a RBI of 55, a 3 stolen bases, and a 16 sacrifice bunts.

=== After retirement ===
After his retirement, Arakane had been appointed as a scout for the Fukuoka Softbank Hawks.

He was also in charge of developing second and third squad fielders starting with the 2021 season.

On December 1, 2023, Arakane was appointed as the fourth squad fielder supervisor and defense and base running coordinator.
