= Kim Jong-kook (baseball) =

South Korean baseball player

- Second baseman, Outfielder, Coach
- Born: September 14, 1973 (age 52)
- Batted: Right Threw: Right

KBO debut
- April 13, 1996, for the Haitai Tigers

Last KBO appearance
- 2009, for the Kia Tigers

KBO statistics (through 2009)
- Batting average: .247
- Home runs: 66
- RBI: 429
- Stats at Baseball Reference

Teams
- Haitai Tigers / Kia Tigers (1996–2009)

Career highlights and awards
- KBO League Golden Glove Award winner (2002); 3x Korean Series champion (1996, 1997, 2009)

Kim Jong-kook
Medal record

Men's baseball

World Baseball Classic
| Bronze medal – third place | 2006 San Diego | Team |

Kim Jong-kook (Korean: 김종국; Hanja: 金鍾國; born September 14, 1973, in Gwangju, South Korea) is a retired South Korean second baseman who played 14 seasons for the Kia Tigers of the KBO League. He batted and threw right-handed.

He joined the Haitai Tigers in 1996. His batting average was not good, but his fielding was excellent. So he was chosen for the South Korea national baseball team a few times, including during the 2006 World Baseball Classic. This characteristic made his nickname “Defender.”
