= Li Chenhao =

Chinese baseball player

Li Chenhao (Chinese: 李晨浩; pinyin: Lǐ Chénhào; born 2 July 1977 in Beijing, China) is a Chinese baseball player who was a member of Team China at the 2008 Summer Olympics.

== Sports career ==
- 1992 Beijing Lucheng Sports School (Baseball)
- 1994 Houston Municipal Baseball Team
- 1994 National Team

== Major performances ==
- 1997/2005 National Games - 1st/2nd
- 1998/2002 Asian Games - 4th
- 2003-2005 National League - 1st
