= KBO Futures League =

Korean minor-league baseball league

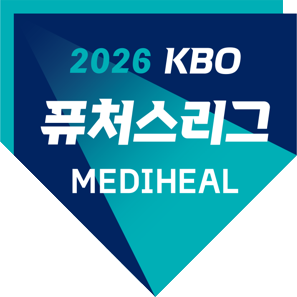
- Sport: Baseball
- Founded: 1990
- Organising body: Korea Baseball Organization (KBO)
- No. of teams: 12
- Country: South Korea
- Streaming partners: YouTube; Sporki
- Related competitions: KBO League (Main League)
- Website: Homepage

KBO Futures League (Korean: KBO 퓨처스리그) or Korea Baseball Futures League is South Korea's second level of baseball, below the KBO League. It serves as a farm league with the purpose to develop professional players on-demand to play in the KBO League. The league consists of two divisions — the Southern League and the Northern League. These leagues are governed by the Korea Baseball Organization (KBO). The league plays an 80-game season.

== History ==
The KBO League was founded in 1982, with the second-tier league being founded in 1990. The initial roster of seven teams in the 1990 season was:

- Binggrae Eagles
- Haitai Tigers
- Lotte Giants
- LG Twins
- Ssangbangwool Raiders
- Samsung Lions
- Pacific Dolphins

The Ssangbangwool Raiders played the initial season in the Futures League; the team moved up to the KBO League in 1991 (although it left behind its minor-league team as well). The Raiders franchise was dissolved after the 1999 season.

The SK Wyverns added a minor-league franchise in 2001, playing their home games at SK Dream Park in the Nam District of Incheon.

Two unaffiliated teams joined the minor leagues in 2005: the Korean Police Baseball Team, operated by the Seoul Metropolitan Police Agency, and the Sangmu Phoenix, part of the Korea Armed Forces Athletic Corps. Many KBO League players serving compulsory military service opted to play for the Police and Sangmu teams, usually for a term of two seasons.

The Hyundai Unicorns (formerly the Pacific Dolphins) — both the KBO League team and the second-tier team — were dissolved after the 2007 season.

The minor league's name was changed to the "Futures League" in 2008. That same year the Hwaseong Heroes joined the league.

In 2012, two teams based in Goyang joined the Futures League: the Goyang Dinos and the Goyang Wonders. (The Wonders' games were considered unofficially "friendly" contests.) Now with 11 teams, the Futures League divided into two divisions: the Northern League and the Southern League. A "Freedom Division" was also created for the Dinos and the Wonders. The Dinos only played the one season in the Futures League before being elevated to the KBO League — as the NC Dinos — prior to the 2013 season.

Also in 2012, the third-level squad of Nippon Professional Baseball's Fukuoka SoftBank Hawks, began playing 12 games a year against Futures League teams.

The Suwon KT Wiz started out in 2013 as a Futures League team and played with Goyang Wonders in the Freedom Division; after two seasons the Wiz were elevated to the KBO (as the KT Wiz) in 2015. (The Goyang Wonders, meanwhile, were dissolved after the 2014 season.)

In 2015, the Futures League reorganized into three divisions: the Red League (Goyang Dinos, Hanwha Eagles, Hwaseong Heroes, SK Wyverns), the Blue League (Doosan Bears, LG Twins, Police, Suwon KT Wiz), and the Yellow League (Kia Tigers, Lotte Giants, Samsung Lions, Sangmu Phoenix). The 2015 Blue League champion was the Police Baseball Team; the Red League champion was the Goyang Dinos; and the Yellow League champion was the Sangmu Phoenix.

The league returned to the Northern and Southern League divisions in 2016.

The Sangmu Phoenix were champions of the Southern League in 2013, 2014, 2016, 2017, 2018, and 2019; the Police baseball team was the champion of the Northern League in 2012, 2013, 2014, 2016, 2017, and 2018. The Police team was disbanded after the 2019 Futures League season.

== Teams ==
Map of independent baseball leagues and teams in South Korea
KBO-affiliated teams
Unaffiliated teams

=== Current ===
Most of the Korean minor league teams carry the same name, and use the same uniforms, as their parent team.

==== Southern League ====
| Team | City | Stadium |
|---|---|---|
| KT Wiz | Iksan | Iksan Stadium |
| Hanwha Eagles | Seosan | Seosan Baseball Training Center |
| KIA Tigers | Hampyeong | Kia Challengers Field |
| Samsung Lions | Gyeongsan | Samsung Lions Ballpark |
| Lotte Giants | Gimhae | Sangdong Baseball Stadium |
| Ulsan Whales (Note: Unaffiliated with a KBO League team.) | Ulsan | Ulsan Munsu Baseball Stadium |

==== Northern League ====
| Team | City | Stadium |
|---|---|---|
| Goyang Heroes (Note: The second level squad of Kiwoom Heroes. The first and second level squads have not shared the team name since 2014. Formerly, Woori Heroes, Seoul Heroes, Nexen Heroes and Hwaseong Heroes.) | Goyang | Goyang National Baseball Training Stadium |
| NC Dinos (Note: The second level squad of the baseball club is called the "C-Team" while the first level squad is known as the "N-Team" and the disabled list is called the "D-Team". The letters N, C and D are from the baseball club's name NC Dinos.) | Changwon | Masan Baseball Stadium |
| SSG Landers (Note: Formerly, SK Wyverns.) | Incheon | SK Futures Park |
| Doosan Bears (Note: Formerly, OB Bears.) | Icheon | Bears Park |
| LG Twins (Note: Formerly, MBC Chungyong.) | Icheon | LG Champion's Park |
| Sangmu Phoenix | Mungyeong | Sangmu Baseball Stadium |

==== Non-regular team ====
- Fukuoka SoftBank Hawks (Note: The third level squad of the Japanese Baseball Club.)

=== Former teams ===
| Team | Years |
|---|---|
| Ssangbangwool Raiders | 1990–1999 |
| Hyundai Unicorns (Note: Until 1995, Pacific Dolphins (태평양 돌핀스).) | 1990–2007 |
| Goyang Wonders (Note: Goyang Wonders was an independent non-regular team and not affiliated with the KBO League.) | 2012–2014 |
| Police (Note: Folded due to change in military system.) | 2005–2019 |

== KBO Fall League ==
In 2022, the KBO started the KBO Futures Education League (later renamed to the Ulsan-KBO Fall League), an off-season fall showcase league that competes solely in the month of October. Similar in structure and purpose to Major League Baseball's Arizona Fall League, it features developmental KBO players, players newly draft eligible, players from South Korea's independent baseball leagues, and teams from outside of South Korea.

=== Teams ===
| Team | City/Home | Years active |
|---|---|---|
| KT Wiz | Iksan | 2022 |
| Hanwha Eagles | Seosan | 2022 |
| Sangmu Phoenix | Mungyeong | 2023 |
| KIA Tigers | Hampyeong | 2023 |
| Samsung Lions | Gyeongsan | 2022 |
| Lotte Giants | Gimhae | 2022–present |
| Goyang Heroes | Goyang | 2024–present |
| NC Dinos | Changwon | 2022–present |
| LG Twins | Icheon | 2022–present |
| Fukuoka SoftBank Hawks (Note: The Fukuoka SoftBank Hawks and Cuban national team only participate for half the month and share a record.) | Fukuoka, Japan | 2022–present |
| Independent All-Stars (Note: All-star team from the independent Gyeonggi Challenge Baseball League) | Gyeonggi | 2024–present |
| Jiangsu Huge Horses | Jiangsu, China | 2024–present |
| Cuba national baseball team | Cuba | 2024–present |
| Team LMB (Note: All-star team from the Mexican Baseball League) | Mexico | 2024–present |
| Melbourne Aces | Melbourne, Australia | 2025–present |

== See also ==
- Eastern League and Western League, similar minor leagues in Japan
- Baseball in South Korea
- Korea Baseball Organization
- KBO League
- All-Star Futures Game
