= KBO League Golden Glove Award =

Korea Baseball Organization annual award

The KBO League Golden Glove Award is an award given out annually by the Korea Baseball Organization (KBO) to the best overall player at each position in the KBO League. It is also commonly known as the KBO Golden Gloves. The award was established in KBO League's inaugural year in 1982.

== Selection format ==
Each year, one award is given to the best player at each position, as voted by baseball writers, analysts and broadcasters. (In the KBO's first year, 1982, the award was given exclusively for defensive prowess, similar to the MLB Gold Glove Award). All outfielders are grouped for three outfielder awards and designated hitters have been included since 1984. League leaders in major offensive and pitching categories earn automatic nominations for the award. Other position players have to appear in a minimal number of defensive innings at the position, while starting pitchers have to appear in sufficient innings to qualify for the ERA title (i.e. 144 innings or average of 1 per game) to be nominated. Relievers can qualify by recording at least 10 wins, 30 saves or 30 holds.

== Award winners ==
Year	Pitcher (P)	Catcher (C)	First Baseman (1B)	Second Baseman (2B)	Third Baseman (3B)	Shortstop (SS)	Outfielder (OF)	Outfielder (OF)	Outfielder (OF)	Designated Hitter (DH)
1982	Hwang Tae-hwan; OB Bears	Kim Yong-oon; MBC Blue Dragons	Kim Yong-dal; MBC Blue Dragons	Cha Yong-hwa; Haitai Tigers	Kim Yong-hee; Lotte Giants	Oh Dae-seok; Samsung Lions	Kim Joon-hwan; Haitai Tigers	Kim Song-kwan; Lotte Giants	Yang Seung-kwan; Sammi Superstars	
1983	Jang Myeong-bu; Sammi Superstars	Lee Man-soo; Samsung Lions	Shin Gyeong-sik; OB Bears	Jeong Koo-seon; Sammi Superstars	Kim Yong-hee; Lotte Giants	Kim Jae-bak; MBC Blue Dragons	Jang Hyo-jo; Samsung Lions	Kim Jong-mo; Haitai Tigers	Park Jong-hoon; OB Bears	
1984	Choi Dong-won; Lotte Giants	Lee Man-soo; Samsung Lions	Kim Yong-cheol; Lotte Giants	Jeong Koo-seon; Sammi Superstars	Lee Kwang-eun; MBC Blue Dragons	Kim Jae-bak; MBC Blue Dragons	Hong Mun-jong; Lotte Giants	Jang Hyo-jo; Samsung Lions	Kim Jong-mo; Haitai Tigers	Yang Se-jong; OB Bears
1985	Kim Si-jin; Samsung Lions	Lee Man-soo; Samsung Lions	Kim Seong-han; Haitai Tigers	Jeong Koo-seon; Chungbo Pintos	Lee Sun-cheol; Haitai Tigers	Kim Jae-bak; MBC Blue Dragons	Jang Hyo-jo; Samsung Lions	Lee Kwang-eun; MBC Blue Dragons	Park Jong-hoon; OB Bears	Kim Yong-hee; Lotte Giants
1986	Sun Dong-yol; Haitai Tigers	Lee Man-soo; Samsung Lions	Kim Seong-han; Haitai Tigers	Kim Seong-rae; Samsung Lions	Han Dae-hwa; Haitai Tigers	Kim Jae-bak; MBC Blue Dragons	Jang Hyo-jo; Samsung Lions	Kim Jong-mo; Haitai Tigers	Lee Kwang-eun; MBC Blue Dragons	Kim Bong-yeon; Haitai Tigers
1987	Kim Si-jin; Samsung Lions	Lee Man-soo; Samsung Lions	Kim Seong-han; Haitai Tigers	Kim Seong-rae; Samsung Lions	Han Dae-hwa; Haitai Tigers	Ryu Jung-il; Samsung Lions	Jang Hyo-jo; Samsung Lions	Kim Jong-mo; Haitai Tigers	Lee Kwang-eun; MBC Blue Dragons	Yu Seung-an; Binggrae Eagles
1988	Sun Dong-yol; Haitai Tigers	Jang Chae-geun; Haitai Tigers	Kim Seong-han; Haitai Tigers	Kim Seong-rae; Samsung Lions	Han Dae-hwa; Haitai Tigers	Chang Jong-hoon; Binggrae Eagles	Lee Gang-don; Binggrae Eagles	Lee Jong-hoon; Binggrae Eagles	Lee Sun-cheol; Haitai Tigers	Kim Yong-cheol; Lotte Giants
1989	Sun Dong-yol; Haitai Tigers	Yu Seung-an; Binggrae Eagles	Kim Seong-han; Haitai Tigers	Gang Gi-ung; Samsung Lions	Han Dae-hwa; Haitai Tigers	Kim Jae-bak; MBC Blue Dragons	Go Won-bu; Binggrae Eagles	Kim Il-kwon; Taepyungyang Dolphins	Lee Gang-don; Binggrae Eagles	Park Cheol-woo; Haitai Tigers
1990	Sun Dong-yol; Haitai Tigers	Kim Dong-soo; LG Twins	Kim Seong-han; Haitai Tigers	Gang Gi-ung; Samsung Lions	Han Dae-hwa; Haitai Tigers	Chang Jong-hoon; Binggrae Eagles	Lee Gang-don; Binggrae Eagles	Lee Ho-seong; Haitai Tigers	Lee Jong-hoon; Binggrae Eagles	Park Sung-ho; Samsung Lions
1991	Sun Dong-yol; Haitai Tigers	Jang Chae-geun; Haitai Tigers	Kim Seong-han; Haitai Tigers	Park Jong-tae; Lotte Giants	Han Dae-hwa; Haitai Tigers	Ryu Jung-il; Samsung Lions	Lee Gang-don; Binggrae Eagles	Lee Ho-seong; Haitai Tigers	Lee Sun-cheol; Haitai Tigers	Chang Jong-hoon; Binggrae Eagles
1992	Yeom Jong-seok; Lotte Giants	Jang Chae-geun; Haitai Tigers	Chang Jong-hoon; Binggrae Eagles	Park Jong-tae; Lotte Giants	Song Gu-hong; LG Twins	Park Gye-won; Lotte Giants	Kim Eung-guk; Lotte Giants	Lee Jong-hoon; Binggrae Eagles	Lee Sun-cheol; Haitai Tigers	Kim Ki-tai; Ssangbangwool Raiders
1993	Sun Dong-yol; Haitai Tigers	Kim Dong-soo; LG Twins	Kim Seong-rae; Samsung Lions	Gang Gi-ung; Samsung Lions	Han Dae-hwa; LG Twins	Lee Jong-beom; Haitai Tigers	Jeon Jun-ho; Lotte Giants	Kim Kwang-rim; Ssangbangwool Raiders	Lee Sun-cheol; Haitai Tigers	Kim Ki-tai; Ssangbangwool Raiders
1994	Jeong Myeong-won; Taepyungyang Dolphins	Kim Dong-soo; LG Twins	Seo Yong-bin; LG Twins	Park Jong-ho; LG Twins	Han Dae-hwa; LG Twins	Lee Jong-beom; Haitai Tigers	Kim Jae-hyun; LG Twins	Park No-joon; Ssangbangwool Raiders	Yoon Deok-kyu; Taepyungyang Dolphins	Kim Ki-tai; Ssangbangwool Raiders
1995	Lee Sang-hoon; LG Twins	Kim Dong-soo; LG Twins	Chang Jong-hoon; Hanwha Eagles	Lee Myeong-su; OB Bears	Hong Hyun-woo; Haitai Tigers	Kim Min-ho; OB Bears	Jeon Jun-ho; Lotte Giants	Kim Kwang-rim; Ssangbangwool Raiders	Kim Sang-ho; OB Bears	Kim Hyeong-seok; OB Bears
1996	Koo Dae-sung; Hanwha Eagles	Park Kyung-oan; Ssangbangwool Raiders	Kim Gyeong-gi; Hyundai Unicorns	Park Jong-tae; Lotte Giants	Hong Hyun-woo; Haitai Tigers	Lee Jong-beom; Haitai Tigers	Kim Eung-guk; Lotte Giants	Park Jae-hong; Hyundai Unicorns	Yang Joon-hyuk; Samsung Lions	Park Jae-yong; Haitai Tigers
1997	Lee Dae-jin; Haitai Tigers	Kim Dong-soo; LG Twins	Lee Seung-yuop; Samsung Lions	Choe Tae-won; Ssangbangwool Raiders	Hong Hyun-woo; Haitai Tigers	Lee Jong-beom; Haitai Tigers	Lee Byung-kyu; LG Twins	Park Jae-hong; Hyundai Unicorns	Yang Joon-hyuk; Samsung Lions	Park Jae-yong; Haitai Tigers
1998	Chung Min-tae; Hyundai Unicorns	Park Kyung-oan; Hyundai Unicorns	Lee Seung-yuop; Samsung Lions	Park Jong-tae; Lotte Giants	Kim Han-soo; Samsung Lions	Yoo Ji-hyun; LG Twins	Jeon Jun-ho; Hyundai Unicorns	Kim Jae-hyun; LG Twins	Park Jae-hong; Hyundai Unicorns	Yang Joon-hyuk; Samsung Lions
1999	Chung Min-tae; Hyundai Unicorns	Kim Dong-soo; Samsung Lions	Lee Seung-yuop; Samsung Lions	Park Jong-tae; Lotte Giants	Kim Han-soo; Samsung Lions	Yoo Ji-hyun; LG Twins	Jung Soo-keun; Doosan Bears	Lee Byung-kyu; LG Twins	Felix Jose; Lotte Giants	Dan Rohrmeier; Hanwha Eagles
2000	Lim Sun-dong; Hyundai Unicorns	Park Kyung-oan; Hyundai Unicorns	Lee Seung-yuop; Samsung Lions	Park Jong-ho; Hyundai Unicorns	Kim Dong-joo; Doosan Bears	Park Jin-man; Hyundai Unicorns	Lee Byung-kyu; LG Twins	Park Jae-hong; Hyundai Unicorns	Song Ji-man; Hanwha Eagles	Tyrone Woods; Doosan Bears
2001	Shin Yoon-ho; LG Twins	Hong Sung-heon; Doosan Bears	Lee Seung-yuop; Samsung Lions	Ahn Kyung-hyun; Doosan Bears	Kim Han-soo; Samsung Lions	Park Jin-man; Hyundai Unicorns	Jung Soo-keun; Doosan Bears	Lee Byung-kyu; LG Twins	Shim Jae-hak; Doosan Bears	Yang Joon-hyuk; LG Twins
2002	Song Jin-woo; Hanwha Eagles	Jin Kab-yong; Samsung Lions	Lee Seung-yuop; Samsung Lions	Kim Jong-kook; Kia Tigers	Kim Han-soo; Samsung Lions	Tilson Brito; Samsung Lions	Lee Jong-beom; Kia Tigers	Shim Jeong-soo; Hyundai Unicorns	Song Ji-man; Hanwha Eagles	Ma Hae-young; Samsung Lions
2003	Chung Min-tae; Hyundai Unicorns	Kim Dong-soo; Hyundai Unicorns	Lee Seung-yuop; Samsung Lions	Ahn Kyung-hyun; Doosan Bears	Kim Han-soo; Samsung Lions	Hong Se-wan; Kia Tigers	Lee Jong-beom; Kia Tigers	Shim Jeong-soo; Hyundai Unicorns	Yang Joon-hyuk; Samsung Lions	Kim Dong-joo; Doosan Bears
2004	Bae Young-soo; Samsung Lions	Hong Sung-heon; Doosan Bears	Yang Joon-hyuk; Samsung Lions	Park Jong-ho; Samsung Lions	Kim Han-soo; Samsung Lions	Park Jin-man; Hyundai Unicorns	Cliff Brumbaugh; Hyundai Unicorns	Lee Byung-kyu; LG Twins	Lee Jin-young/ Park Han-yi; SK Wyverns/ Samsung Lions	Kim Ki-tai; SK Wyverns
2005	Son Min-han; Lotte Giants	Jin Kab-yong; Samsung Lions	Kim Tae-kyun; Hanwha Eagles	Ahn Kyung-hyun; Doosan Bears	Lee Bum-ho; Hanwha Eagles	Son Si-hyun; Doosan Bears	Lee Byung-kyu; LG Twins	Jay Davis; Hanwha Eagles	Larry Sutton; Hyundai Unicorns	Kim Jae-hyun; SK Wyverns
2006	Ryu Hyun-jin; Hanwha Eagles	Jin Kab-yong; Samsung Lions	Lee Dae-ho; Lotte Giants	Jeong Keun-woo; SK Wyverns	Lee Bum-ho; Hanwha Eagles	Park Jin-man; Samsung Lions	Lee Taek-keun; Hyundai Unicorns	Lee Yong-kyu; Kia Tigers	Park Han-yi; Samsung Lions	Yang Joon-hyuk; Samsung Lions
2007	Danny Rios; Doosan Bears	Park Kyung-oan; SK Wyverns	Lee Dae-ho; Lotte Giants	Ko Young-min; Doosan Bears	Kim Dong-joo; Doosan Bears	Park Jin-man; Samsung Lions	Lee Jong-wook; Doosan Bears	Shim Jeong-soo; Samsung Lions	Lee Dae-hyung; LG Twins	Yang Joon-hyuk; Samsung Lions
2008	Kim Kwang-hyun; SK Wyverns	Kang Min-ho; Lotte Giants	Kim Tae-kyun; Hanwha Eagles	Cho Sung-hwan; Lotte Giants	Kim Dong-joo; Doosan Bears	Park Ki-hyuk; Lotte Giants	Karim García; Lotte Giants	Kim Hyun-soo; Doosan Bears	Lee Jong-wook; Doosan Bears	Hong Sung-heon; Doosan Bears
2009	Aquilino López; Kia Tigers	Kim Sang-hoon; Kia Tigers	Choi Hee-seop; Kia Tigers	Jeong Keun-woo; SK Wyverns	Kim Sang-hyun; Kia Tigers	Son Si-hyun; Doosan Bears	Kim Hyun-soo; Doosan Bears	Park Yong-taik; LG Twins	Lee Taek-keun; Seoul Heroes	Hong Sung-heon; Lotte Giants
2010	Ryu Hyun-jin; Hanwha Eagles	Cho In-sung; LG Twins	Choi Joon-suk; Doosan Bears	Cho Sung-hwan; Lotte Giants	Lee Dae-ho; Lotte Giants	Kang Jung-ho; Nexen Heroes	Kim Hyun-soo; Doosan Bears	Kim Kang-min; SK Wyverns	Lee Jong-wook; Doosan Bears	Hong Sung-heon; Lotte Giants
2011	Yoon Suk-min; Kia Tigers	Kang Min-ho; Lotte Giants	Lee Dae-ho; Lotte Giants	An Chi-hong; Kia Tigers	Choi Jeong; SK Wyverns	Lee Dae-soo; Hanwha Eagles	Choi Hyoung-woo; Samsung Lions	Lee Yong-kyu; Kia Tigers	Son Ah-seop; Lotte Giants	Hong Sung-heon; Lotte Giants
2012	Jang Won-sam; Samsung Lions	Kang Min-ho; Lotte Giants	Park Byung-ho; Nexen Heroes	Seo Geon-chang; Nexen Heroes	Choi Jeong; SK Wyverns	Kang Jung-ho; Nexen Heroes	Park Yong-taik; LG Twins	Lee Yong-kyu; Kia Tigers	Son Ah-seop; Lotte Giants	Lee Seung-yuop; Samsung Lions
2013	Son Seung-lak; Nexen Heroes	Kang Min-ho; Lotte Giants	Park Byung-ho; Nexen Heroes	Jeong Keun-woo; SK Wyverns	Choi Jeong; SK Wyverns	Kang Jung-ho; Nexen Heroes	Park Yong-taik; LG Twins	Choi Hyoung-woo; Samsung Lions	Son Ah-seop; Lotte Giants	Lee Byung-kyu; LG Twins
2014	Andy Van Hekken; Nexen Heroes	Yang Eui-ji; Doosan Bears	Park Byung-ho; Nexen Heroes	Seo Geon-chang; Nexen Heroes	Park Seok-min; Samsung Lions	Kang Jung-ho; Nexen Heroes	Na Sung-bum; NC Dinos	Choi Hyung-woo; Samsung Lions	Son Ah-seop; Lotte Giants	Lee Seung-yuop; Samsung Lions
2015	Eric Hacker; NC Dinos	Yang Eui-ji; Doosan Bears	Eric Thames; NC Dinos	Yamaico Navarro; Samsung Lions	Park Seok-min; Samsung Lions	Kim Jae-ho; Doosan Bears	Na Sung-bum; NC Dinos	Kim Hyun-soo; Doosan Bears	Yoo Han-joon; KT Wiz	Lee Seung-yuop; Samsung Lions
2016	Dustin Nippert; Doosan Bears	Yang Eui-ji; Doosan Bears	Eric Thames; NC Dinos	Seo Geon-chang; Nexen Heroes	Choi Jeong; SK Wyverns	Kim Jae-ho; Doosan Bears	Choi Hyoung-woo; Samsung Lions	Kim Joo-chan; Kia Tigers	Kim Jae-hwan; Doosan Bears	Kim Tae-kyun; Hanwha Eagles
2017	Yang Hyeon-jong; Kia Tigers	Kang Min-ho; Samsung Lions	Lee Dae-ho; Lotte Giants	An Chi-hong; Kia Tigers	Choi Jeong; SK Wyverns	Kim Sun-bin; Kia Tigers	Choi Hyoung-woo; Kia Tigers	Roger Bernadina; Kia Tigers	Son Ah-seop; Lotte Giants	Park Yong-taik; LG Twins
2018	Josh Lindblom; Doosan Bears	Yang Eui-ji; Doosan Bears	Park Byung-ho; Nexen Heroes	An Chi-hong; Kia Tigers	Hur Kyoung-min; Doosan Bears	Kim Ha-seong; Nexen Heroes	Kim Jae-hwan; Doosan Bears	Jeon Jun-woo; Lotte Giants	Lee Jung-hoo; Nexen Heroes	Lee Dae-ho; Lotte Giants
2019	Josh Lindblom; Doosan Bears	Yang Eui-ji; NC Dinos	Park Byung-ho; Kiwoom Heroes	Park Min-woo; NC Dinos	Choi Jeong; SK Wyverns	Kim Ha-seong; Kiwoom Heroes	Lee Jung-hoo; Kiwoom Heroes	Mel Rojas Jr. KT Wiz	Jerry Sands; Kiwoom Heroes	José Miguel Fernández; Doosan Bears
2020	Raúl Alcántara; Doosan Bears	Yang Eui-ji; NC Dinos	Kang Baek-ho; KT Wiz	Park Min-woo; NC Dinos	Hwang Jae-gyun; KT Wiz	Kim Ha-seong; Kiwoom Heroes	Mel Rojas Jr. KT Wiz	Kim Hyun-soo; LG Twins	Lee Jung-hoo; Kiwoom Heroes	Choi Hyoung-woo; Kia Tigers
2021	Ariel Miranda; Doosan Bears	Kang Min-ho; Samsung Lions	Kang Baek-ho; KT Wiz	Jung Eun-won; Hanwha Eagles	Choi Jeong; SSG Landers	Kim Hye-seong; Kiwoom Heroes	Lee Jung-hoo; Kiwoom Heroes	Hong Chang-ki; LG Twins	Koo Ja-wook; Samsung Lions	Yang Eui-ji; NC Dinos
2022	An Woo-jin; Kiwoom Heroes	Yang Eui-ji; NC Dinos	Park Byung-ho; KT Wiz	Kim Hye-seong; Kiwoom Heroes	Choi Jeong; SSG Landers	Oh Ji-hwan; LG Twins	Lee Jung-hoo; Kiwoom Heroes	Na Sung-bum; Kia Tigers	José Pirela; Samsung Lions	Lee Dae-ho; Lotte Giants
2023	Erick Fedde; NC Dinos	Yang Eui-ji; Doosan Bears	Austin Dean; LG Twins	Kim Hye-seong; Kiwoom Heroes	Roh Si-hwan; Hanwha Eagles	Oh Ji-hwan; LG Twins	Hong Chang-ki; LG Twins	Koo Ja-wook; Samsung Lions	Park Kun-woo; NC Dinos	Son Ah-seop; NC Dinos
2024	Kyle Hart; NC Dinos	Kang Min-ho; Samsung Lions	Austin Dean; LG Twins	Kim Hye-seong; Kiwoom Heroes	Kim Do-yeong Kia Tigers	Park Chan-ho Kia Tigers	Víctor Reyes; Lotte Giants	Mel Rojas Jr. KT Wiz	Koo Ja-wook; Samsung Lions	Choi Hyoung-woo; Kia Tigers
2025	Cody Ponce Hanwha Eagles	Yang Eui-ji; Doosan Bears	Lewin Díaz Samsung Lions	Shin Min-jae LG Twins	Song Sung-mun Kiwoom Heroes	Kim Ju-Won NC Dinos	Víctor Reyes; Lotte Giants	Ahn Hyun-min KT Wiz	Koo Ja-wook; Samsung Lions	Choi Hyoung-woo; Kia Tigers
2026										

== Records ==
Most total awards:

- Lee Seung-yuop (이승엽; 李承燁). 10 times (1B: 1997–2003 | DH: 2012, 2014–2015)
- Yang Eui-ji (양의지; 梁義智). 10 times (C: 2014–2016, 2018–2020, 2022–23, 2025 | DH: 2021)
- Choi Jeong (최정; 崔廷). 8 times (3B: 2011–2013, 2016–2017, 2019, 2021–2022)
- Yang Joon-hyuk (양준혁; 梁埈赫). 8 times (1B: 2004 | OF: 1996–1997, 2003 | DH: 1998, 2001, 2006–2007)
- Han Dae-hwa (한대화; 韓大化). 8 times (3B: 1986–1991, 1993–1994)

Most awarded pitcher:

- Sun Dong-yol (선동열; 宣銅烈). 6 times (1986, 1988–1991, 1993)

Most awarded catcher:

- Yang Eui-ji (양의지; 梁義智). 9 times (2014–2016, 2018–2020, 2022–23, 2025)

Most awarded first baseman:

- Kim Seong-han (김성한; 金城漢). 7 times (1985–1991)
- Lee Seung-yuop (이승엽; 李承燁). 7 times (1997–2003)

Most awarded second baseman:

- Park Jeong-tae. 5 times (1991–1992, 1996, 1998–1999)

Most awarded third baseman:

- Han Dae-hwa (한대화; 韓大化). 8 times (1986–1991, 1993–1994)
- Choi Jeong (최정; 崔廷). 8 times (2011–2013, 2016–2017, 2019, 2021–2022)

Most awarded shortstop:

- Kim Jae-bak (김재박; 金在博). 5 times (1983–1986, 1989)
- Park Jin-man (박진만; 朴鎮萬). 5 times (2000–2001, 2004, 2006–2007)

Most awarded outfielder:

- Lee Byung-kyu (이병규; 李炳圭). 6 times (1997, 1999–2001, 2004–2005)

Most awarded designated hitter:

- Kim Ki-tai (김기태; 金杞泰). 4 times (1992–1994, 2004)
- Yang Joon-hyuk (양준혁). 4 times (1998, 2001, 2006–2007)
- Hong Sung-heon (홍성흔; 洪性炘). 4 times (2008–2011)

Oldest Golden Glove Award:

- Choi Hyoung-woo(최형우;崔炯宇).41 years, 11 days. 23 days (2025)

== Foreign-born award winners ==
Each KBO team is allowed to sign up to three foreign-born players (two pitchers and one position player). The following is a list of foreign players that have won the KBO Golden Gloves over the years:

- Félix José (1999, outfielder)
- Dan Rohrmeier (1999, designated hitter)
- Tyrone Woods (2000, designated hitter)
- Tilson Brito (2002, shortstop)
- Cliff Brumbaugh (2004, outfielder)
- Jay Davis (2005, outfielder)
- Larry Sutton (2005, outfielder)
- Danny Rios (2007, pitcher)
- Karim García (2008, outfielder)
- Aquilino López (2009, pitcher)
- Andy Van Hekken (2014, pitcher)
- Eric Hacker (2015, pitcher)
- Eric Thames (2015–2016, first baseman)
- Yamaico Navarro (2015, second baseman)
- Dustin Nippert (2016, pitcher)
- Roger Bernadina (2017, outfielder)
- Josh Lindblom (2018–2019, pitcher)
- Mel Rojas Jr. (2019–2020, 2024 outfielder)
- Jerry Sands (2019, outfielder)
- José Miguel Fernández (2019, designated hitter)
- Raúl Alcántara (2020, pitcher)
- Ariel Miranda (2021, pitcher)
- José Pirela (2022, outfielder)
- Austin Dean (2023–2024, first baseman)
- Kyle Hart (2024, pitcher)
- Víctor Reyes (2024-2025, outfielder)
- Cody Ponce (2025, pitcher)
- Lewin Díaz (2025, first baseman)

== See also ==
- List of MLB players from South Korea
- KBO posting system
