= Ho-sung =

- Hangul: 호성
- RR: Hoseong
- MR: Hosŏng

Ho-sung, also spelled Ho-seong, is a Korean given name.

People with this name include:

- Kim Ho-seong (1959-2021), South Korean voice actor
- Lee Ho-seong (baseball) (1967–2008), South Korean baseball player
- Ho-Sung Pak (born 1967), South Korean-born American film actor and martial artist
- Lee Ho-sung (fencer) (born 1968), South Korean fencer
- Kim Sol (born Kim Ho-seong, 1973), South Korean writer
- Choi Ho-sung (born 1973), South Korean golfer
- Cho Ho-sung (born 1974), South Korean track cyclist
- Lee Ho-sung (footballer) (born 1974), South Korean football player

== See also ==
- List of Korean given names
