= List of KBO career RBI leaders =

The following is the current leaderboard for career runs batted in (RBIs) KBO League Korean baseball.

== Players with 1,000 or more RBIs ==
| **Bold** | denotes active player. (Note: A player is considered inactive if he has announced his retirement or not played for a full season.) |

- Stats updated at the end of the 2026 season.

| Rank | Player | RBI |
|---|---|---|
| 1 | **Choi Hyung-woo** | 1,843 (↑106) |
| 2 | **Choi Jeong** | 1,681 (↑57) |
| 3 | **Kim Hyun-soo** | 1,617 (↑95) |
| 4 | Lee Seung-yeop | 1,498 |
| 5 | Lee Dae-ho | 1,425 |
| 6 | Yang Joon-hyuk | 1,389 |
| 7 | **Kang Min-ho** | 1,371 (↑58) |
| 8 | Kim Tae-kyun | 1,358 |
| 9 | **Yang Eui-ji** | 1,274 (↑79) |
| 10 | Lee Ho-joon | 1,265 |
| 11 | Park Byung-ho | 1,244 |
| 12 | **Na Sung-bum** | 1,197 (↑97) |
| 13 | Park Yong-taik | 1,192 |
| 14 | Chang Jong-hoon | 1,145 |
| 15 | Lee Bum-ho | 1,127 |
| 16 | Hwang Jae-gyun | 1,121 |
| 17 | Hong Sung-heon | 1,120 |
| 18 | **Son Ah-seop** | 1,101 (↑15) |
| 19 | Kim Dong-joo | 1,097 |
| 19 | Park Jae-hong | 1,081 |
| 20 | **Jeon Jun-woo** | 1,056 (↑16) |
| 22 | **Kim Jae-hwan** | 1,052 (↑70) |
| 23 | Jang Sung-ho | 1,043 |
| 24 | Park Seok-min | 1,041 |
| 25 | Song Ji-man | 1,030 |
| 26 | Shim Jeong-soo | 1,029 |
| 27 | Ma Hae-yeong | 1,003 |

== See also ==
- List of KBO career strikeout leaders
- List of KBO career win leaders
- List of KBO career home run leaders
- List of KBO career saves leaders
- List of KBO career stolen bases leaders
- List of KBO career hits leaders
