= Jay Davis =

American baseball player

- Center fielder
- Born: October 3, 1970 (age 56); Chicago, Illinois, U.S.
- Batted: Left Threw: Left

KBO debut
- 1999, for the Hanwha Eagles

Last KBO appearance
- 2006, for the Hanwha Eagles

KBO statistics
- Batting average: .313
- Runs scored: 538
- Hits: 979
- Home runs: 167
- Runs batted in: 591
- Stolen bases: 108

Teams
- Hanwha Eagles (1999–2002, 2004–2006)

Career highlights and awards
- KBO: Korean Series champion (1999); Golden Glove Award (2005)

Jay Davis (born October 3, 1970, in Chicago, Illinois) is an American former professional baseball player.

He played seven seasons as an outfielder with the Hanwha Eagles of the Korea Baseball Organization. Davis had the longest career of a foreign player in the KBO League, achieving the highest batting average (minimum 2,000 at-bats) in that category, as well as the most runs scored, the most hits, the most runs batted in, and the most stolen bases of any foreign-born player.

== Career ==
Davis was the 318th pick overall of the 1989 June Amateur Draft, chosen out of Rezin Orr High School by the New York Mets. He spent ten years in the minor leagues, never making it to the Majors.

In 1999, Davis left for Korea and the Hanwha Eagles. He and fellow American import Dan Rohrmeier, as well as Koreans Song Ji-man and Chang Jong-hoon, led the Eagles to the 1999 Korean Series championship; the team had a slugging percentage of .487, the highest team total in KBO League history. Davis contributed with a slash line of .328/.376/.570 with 30 homers, 35 stolen bases, 93 runs, and 106 RBI. His was the seventh-best batting average in the KBO League that year, and tops for all foreign-born players.

In 2000, Davis' .334 batting average was fifth-best in the league; he added 22 home runs and 21 stolen bases. Davis' 2001 season continued the trend, with a slash line of 335/.406/.558 to accompany 30 home runs, 95 runs, and 96 RBI. Davis finished fifth in the KBO League in batting average, and his 166 hits were one behind league leader Lee Byung-kyu. In 2002 Davis hit only .287 with 21 home runs; he still led all American-born players in the KBO in batting average.

After four successful seasons with the Eagles, Davis played the 2003 season in the Mexican League. He returned to Korea and the Eagles for the 2004–2006 seasons. His 2004 season featured a .323 batting average, 24 homers, and a league-leading 90 runs scored (tying Park Yong-taik). With a .323 batting average, 24 home runs, and 86 RBI, Davis earned a 2005 KBO League Golden Glove Award. That year he passed Tyrone Woods for the longest KBO career by a foreigner, and he also broke Woods' record for career RBI by a foreigner. In 2006, Davis hit .284 with 21 home runs.

In Davis' seven seasons with the Eagles, he compiled a .313 batting average, 167 home runs, and 591 runs batted in.
