= Jeong Seong-hun =

- Hangul: 정성훈
- RR: Jeong Seonghun
- MR: Chŏng Sŏnghun

Jeong Seong-hun may refer to:

- Jung Sung-hoon (born 1968), former South Korean footballer
- Jeong Shung-hoon (born 1979), South Korean footballer
- Jeong Seong-hoon (born 1980), South Korean baseball infielder
