= Choi Joon-suk =

South Korean baseball player

- Infielder
- Born: February 15, 1983 (age 43); Daegu, South Korea
- Batted: Right Threw: Right

KBO debut
- October 13, 2002, for the Lotte Giants

Last KBO appearance
- October 2, 2018, for the NC Dinos

KBO statistics
- Batting average: .275
- Home runs: 201
- RBI: 881
- Stats at Baseball Reference

Teams
- Lotte Giants (2002–2006); Doosan Bears (2006–2013); Lotte Giants (2014–2017); NC Dinos (2018)

Career highlights and awards
- KBO League Golden Glove Award (2010)

- Choi Joon-suk
- Hangul: 최준석
- Hanja: 崔俊蓆
- RR: Choe Junseok
- MR: Ch'oe Chunsŏk

Choi Joon-suk (Korean: 최준석; Hanja: 崔俊蓆; born February 15, 1983) is a retired South Korean infielder. He batted and threw right-handed.

After a season in which he hit .321, with 22 home runs and 82 RBI, Choi won the 2010 KBO League Golden Glove Award as a first baseman.

== See also ==
- List of KBO career home run leaders
