= Park Yong-taik =

South Korean baseball player (born 1979)

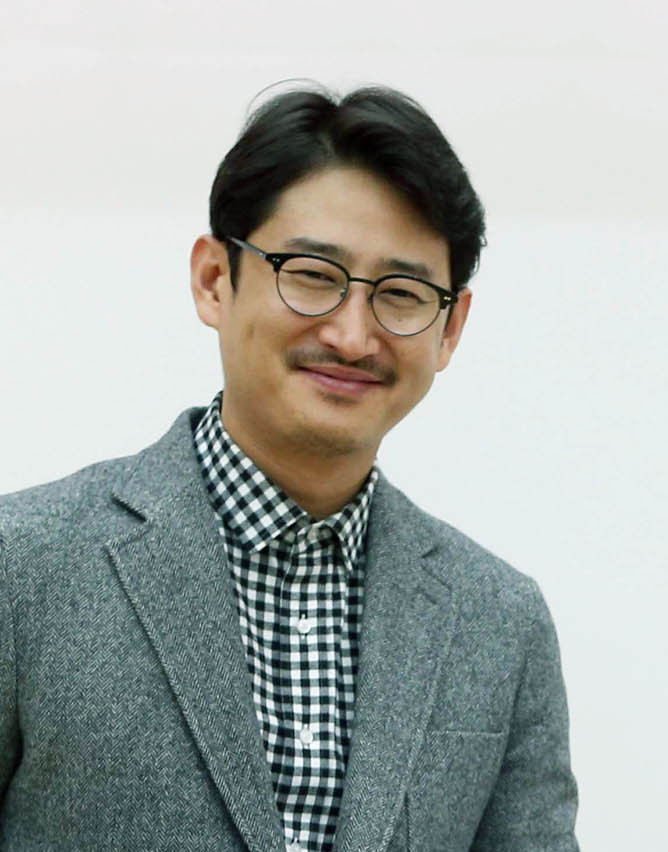

LG Twins – No. 33
- Outfielder
- Born: April 21, 1979 (age 47); Seoul, South Korea
- Bats: Left Throws: Right

KBO debut
- April 2, 2002, for the LG Twins

KBO statistics (through 2020)
- Batting average: .308
- Hits: 2,504
- Home runs: 213
- RBI: 1,192
- Stolen bases: 313
- Stats at Baseball Reference

Teams
- LG Twins (2002–2020, 2022)

Career highlights and awards
- All-time hit leader; 4x Golden Glove Award (2009, 2012, 2013, 2017); 1x stolen base title (2005); 1x runs scored title (2005); 1x batting title (2009)

Park Yong-taik (Korean: 박용택; Hanja: 朴龍澤; born April 21, 1979) is a South Korean outfielder who played his entire career for the LG Twins in the KBO League. With 2,504 career hits, he was the all-time career hit leader in the KBO. He batted left-handed and throws right-handed.

== Amateur career ==
Park attended Whimoon High School in Seoul, South Korea. In 1996, he was selected for the South Korea national junior team that finished in fourth place at the World Junior Baseball Championship in Havana, Cuba.

Upon graduation from high school in 1998, Park entered Korea University instead of turning pro directly.

In 1999, his sophomore year at Korea University, he made his first appearance for the South Korea national baseball team in the Intercontinental Cup held in Sydney, Australia.

In 2001, Park competed in the Asian Baseball Championship in Taiwan. South Korea won the silver medal, and Park was selected to the All-Star team as an outfielder.

=== Notable international careers ===
Year	Venue	Competition	Team	Individual note
1996	Cuba	World Junior Baseball Championship	4th	
1999	Australia	Intercontinental Cup	7th	
2001	Chinese Taipei	Asian Baseball Championship	Silver medal	All-Star (OF)

== Professional career ==
Signed by the LG Twins, Park made his KBO League debut on April 2, 2002. In the 2002 KBO season, he batted .288 which was the highest batting average among the rookie players.

In 2004, He had a .300-plus batting average for the first time (.300), amassing 16 home runs and 58 RBIs.

Park was well known as a base-stealing cleanup hitter. While batting fourth in the order of his team since his rookie season, he stole 40-plus bases in two seasons (2003 and 2005), and won the stolen base title with a career-high 43 in 2005.

In 2006, Park was called up to the South Korea national baseball team for the inaugural World Baseball Classic. He appeared in four games as a pinch hitter, going 1-for-4 with one RBI. In Team Korea's second game of Round 1 against China, Park hit a RBI triple to drive in Lee Bum-Ho as a pinch hitter in the bottom of the seventh.

In 2008, Park fell into a horrendous slump. He batted a career-low .257 with a career-low two home runs, missing 30 games due to injuries.

In 2009, Park had his best career in batting average. He won the KBO batting title with a career-high .372 average and hit 18 home runs. On December 11, 2009, he won the Golden Glove Award as an outfielder.

In 2012, Park received another Golden Glove award.

From 2009 to 2018, Park hit over .300 every season. From 2013 and until 2017, and despite playing in his mid- to late-thirties, Park batted over .320 and reached at least 150 hits in each season, and was widely regarded as one of the best contact hitters in the KBO. With 2,439 career hits at the end of 2019, he is the all-time career hit leader in the KBO, having over-taken Yang Joon-hyuk's mark of 2,318 total hits.

Before the 2020 season, he declared that he would retire after the season.

=== Notable international careers ===
Year	Venue	Competition	Team	Individual note
2006	United States	World Baseball Classic	Bronze medal	.250 BA (1-for-4), 1 RBI

== Filmography ==
=== Television shows ===
Year	Title	Role	Notes	Ref.
2021	Playing Bro 2	Cast Member	Season 2	
2022	Strongest Baseball	Cast Member		

== See also ==
- List of KBO career hits leaders
- List of KBO career home run leaders
- List of KBO career RBI leaders
