= Kim Jae-ho (baseball) =

South Korean baseball player

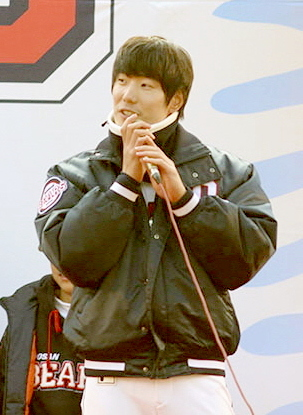

Doosan Bears – No. 52
- Shortstop
- Born: March 21, 1985 (age 40); Seoul, South Korea
- Bats: Right Throws: Right

KBO debut
- April 5, 2004, for the Doosan Bears

KBO statistics (through 2024 season)
- Batting average: .272
- Home runs: 54
- Runs batted in: 600

Teams
- Doosan Bears (2004–2005); Sangmu Phoenix (army) (2006–2007); Doosan Bears (2008–present)

Career highlights and awards
- 2× KBO Golden Glove (2015, 2016)
Medals
Men's baseball
Representing South Korea
2015 WBSC Premier12
Gold medal – first place	2015 Tokyo	Team

Kim Jae-ho (Korean: 김재호; Hanja: 金宰鎬; born March 21, 1985) is a South Korean infielder who plays for the Doosan Bears in the KBO League. Kim graduated from Choong Ang High School and joined the Doosan Bears through the first draft in 2004. His main position is shortstop, however, he sometimes plays as a second baseman. He won the KBO League Golden Glove Award in 2015 and 2016 consecutively.

He handed over his captain's position to Kim Jae-hwan when he was dismissed due to an injury in 2017, and returned to his batting sense, but was dismissed again on August 29, 2017 after being hit by Kim Jae-hwan while defending against the Lotte Giants.

== Career ==
Year	Team	AVG	G	AB	R	H	2B	3B	HR	TB	RBI	SB	CS	BB	HBP	SO	GIDP	E
2004	Doosan Bears	0.000	36	9	4	0	0	0	0	0	0	0	0	0	0	3	0	0
2005	Doosan Bears	0.222	47	27	6	6	1	1	1	12	4	1	0	2	1	5	1	2
2008	Doosan Bears	0.249	112	261	48	65	8	5	1	86	21	12	3	25	2	33	7	14
2009	Doosan Bears	0.239	80	180	27	43	9	4	3	69	36	4	1	20	1	27	5	7
2010	Doosan Bears	0.224	83	85	11	19	3	1	0	24	8	5	1	14	1	15	3	2
2011	Doosan Bears	0.183	57	109	6	20	5	1	0	27	9	1	1	7	2	15	4	5
2012	Doosan Bears	0.215	84	177	23	38	2	2	0	44	11	3	3	16	2	31	5	1
2013	Doosan Bears	0.315	91	248	42	78	10	3	1	97	32	9	6	26	0	24	7	5
2014	Doosan Bears	0.252	122	341	50	86	14	1	3	111	54	2	8	54	2	59	14	11
2015	Doosan Bears	0.307	133	410	63	126	24	3	3	165	50	7	2	54	3	42	18	16
2016	Doosan Bears	0.310	137	416	69	129	27	3	7	183	78	8	4	57	5	52	8	10
		0.269	982	2263	349	610	103	24	19	818	303	52	29	275	19	306	72	73
