= List of KBO career stolen bases leaders =

The following is the current leaderboard for career stolen bases in KBO League Korean baseball.

The first KBO Stolen Base King was Kim Il-kwon, who stole 363 bases in a career that spanned from 1982 to 1991. His record was broken in 1997 by Lee Sun-cheol, who held the record for four years at 371 career steals, until Jeon Jun-ho surpassed him in 2001.

== Players with 250 or more stolen bases ==
**Bold**	denotes active player. (Note: A player is considered inactive if he has announced his retirement or not played for a full season.)

- Stats updated at the end of the 2026 season.

Rank	Player	Stolen bases
1	Jeon Jun-ho	549
2	Lee Jong-beom	510
3	Lee Dae-hyung	505
4	**Park Hae-min**	502 (↑42)
5	Jung Soo-keun	474
6	Lee Yong-kyu	397
7	Kim Joo-chan	388
8	**Jung Soo-bin**	373 (↑20)
9	Jeong Keun-woo	371
	Lee Sun-cheol	371
10	Kim Il-kwon	363
11	**Park Min-woo**	353 (↑50)
12	Lee Jong-wook	340
13	Park Yong-taik	313
14	Yu Ji-hyeon	296
15	Oh Jae-won	289
16	**Oh Ji-hwan**	286 (↑2)
17	Kim Jae-bak	284
19	Park Jae-hong	267
20	**Kim Sang-su**	263 (↑1)
21	Kim Jong-kook	254

== See also ==
- List of KBO career strikeout leaders
- List of KBO career win leaders
- List of KBO career home run leaders
- List of KBO career RBI leaders
- List of KBO career saves leaders
- List of KBO career hits leaders
