= Dan Rohrmeier =

American baseball player (born 1965)

- First baseman
- Born: September 27, 1965 (age 60); Cincinnati, Ohio, U.S.
- Batted: Right Threw: Right

Professional debut
- MLB: September 3, 1997, for the Seattle Mariners
- KBO: April 4, 1999, for the Hanwha Eagles

Last appearance
- MLB: September 28, 1997, for the Seattle Mariners
- KBO: July 11, 2001, for the LG Twins

MLB statistics
- Batting average: .333
- Home runs: 0
- Runs batted in: 2

KBO statistics
- Batting average: .289
- Home runs: 85
- Runs batted in: 252
- Stats at Baseball Reference

Teams
- Seattle Mariners (1997); Hanwha Eagles (1999–2000); LG Twins (2001)

Career highlights and awards
- KBO Golden Glove Award (1999)

Daniel Rohrmeier (born September 27, 1965) is a former professional baseball first baseman. He played in Major League Baseball for the Seattle Mariners in 1997, and in the Korea Baseball Organization from 1999 to 2001 for the Hanwha Eagles and LG Twins.

Rohrmeier attended St. Thomas University, and in 1986 he played collegiate summer baseball with the Hyannis Mets of the Cape Cod Baseball League. He was selected by the Chicago White Sox in the 5th round of the 1987 Major League Baseball draft.

In his first professional season, he batted .329 as a third baseman for the High-A Peninsula White Sox. In both 1988 and 1989, he batted .259 and was sent as part of a conditional deal to the Texas Rangers. While in the Rangers organization, he played three seasons for Double-A Tulsa. Despite having reasonable success, he was released by the Rangers in 1992.

On February 23, 1992, Rohrmeier signed with the Kansas City Royals. Rohrmeier began playing for the Double-A Southern League's Memphis in 1992. Late in the 1994 season, while still playing for the Chicks under manager Ron Johnson, Rohrmeier was approaching Johnson's own single-season Southern League record for doubles. Rohrmeier was released on August 10 by the Royals because, according to the club, he had a physical and verbal altercation with Johnson stemming from his argument with an umpire. According to what The Cincinnati Post called "[o]thers in the Southern League," however, Rohrmeier was let go because he was closing in on Johnson's record. After making some calls, Rohrmeier was offered a roster spot with the Cincinnati Reds' Southern League affiliate within 24 hours of his release. He would end up setting a new Southern League single-season doubles record with 41.

Playing in their minor leagues through 1995 and the Padres minor leagues in 1996, he signed with the Seattle Mariners on December 12, 1996. Rohrmeier had a career year in 1997 with Triple-A Tacoma. He batted .297 with 33 home runs and 120 RBI and earned a September promotion to the majors, going 3 for 9. In 1998, he again played for Triple-A Tacoma and again had a strong season, batting .286 with 25 home runs and 104 RBI.

In 1999, Rohrmeier signed with the Hanwha Eagles, a team in South Korea's KBO League. He and fellow American import Jay Davis, as well as Koreans Song Ji-man and Chang Jong-hoon, led the Eagles to the 1999 Korean Series championship; the team had a slugging percentage of .487, the highest team total in KBO League history. Rohrmeier contributed with 45 home runs and 109 RBI to go with a slash line of .292/.388/.643.

He played two seasons for the Eagles, then one season for the LG Twins, before retiring after the 2001 season.
