= Lee Ho-seong =

Lee Ho-seong may refer to:

- Lee Ho-seong (baseball) (1967–2008), South Korean baseball player and mass murderer
- Lee Ho-seong (fencer) (born 1968)
- Lee Ho-sung (footballer) (born 1974), South Korean football player
