= Jin Kab-yong =

South Korean baseball player

Samsung Lions – No. 96
- Catcher / Coach
- Born: May 8, 1974 (age 51)
- Bats: Right Throws: Right

KBO debut
- April 12, 1997, for the OB Bears

KBO statistics (through 2013)
- Batting average: .275
- Home runs: 151
- RBI: 739
- Stats at Baseball Reference

Teams
- OB Bears / Doosan Bears (1997–1999); Samsung Lions (1999–2015)
Medals
Men's baseball
Representing South Korea
Olympic Games
Gold medal – first place	2008 Beijing	Team

- Jin Kab-yong
- Hangul: 진갑용
- Hanja: 陳甲龍
- RR: Jin Gapyong
- MR: Chin Kabyong

Jin Kab-yong (Korean: 진갑용; born May 8, 1974, in Busan, South Korea) is a retired catcher who last played for the Samsung Lions in the Korea Baseball Organization. He batted and threw right-handed.

== Amateur career ==
In February 1993, while attending Busan High School in Busan, South Korea, Jin was selected for the South Korea national baseball team as a high schooler to compete in the 17th Asian Baseball Championship in Perth, Australia.

After the competition, he began his collegiate career at Korea University in Seoul, South Korea. At Korea University, he led his team to numerous national college titles alongside his battery mates Son Min-han and Cho Sung-min, and did not miss any single international competition that the South Korea national baseball team participated during his four years at college, garnering national attention as a highly regarded baseball prospect.

=== Notable international careers ===
Year	Venue	Competition	Team	Individual note
1992	Mexico	World Junior Baseball Championship	5th	
1993	Australia	Asian Baseball Championship	Silver medal	
1993	United States	Universiade	Silver medal	
1994	Japan	Asian Games	Silver medal	
1994	Nicaragua	Baseball World Cup	Silver medal	.389 BA (7-for-18)
1995	Japan	Universiade	Silver medal	.333 BA (2-for-6), 1 RBI
1995	Japan	Asian Baseball Championship	Silver medal	
1995	Cuba	Intercontinental Cup	4th	
1996	United States	Olympic Games	8th	.346 BA (6-for-29), 3 RBI

== Professional career ==
Jin was selected by the OB Bears with the first pick in the 2nd Round of the 1997 KBO Draft. He entered the league with high expectation, but spent his first Bears career as a backup catcher, appearing in 95 games, hardly showing signs of promise as a starting catcher.

In 1998, Jin was named to the South Korea national baseball team that won the gold medal in the Asian Games in Bangkok, Thailand. Jin received a military exemption for winning the gold medal, along with the fellow gold medalists Park Chan-ho, Seo Jae-weong and Kim Byung-hyun.

In the 1999 season, another catcher prospect Hong Sung-heon was signed by the Bears upon graduation from college, and his arrival provided further fierce competition for the starting catcher position. In July 1999, Jin was eventually traded to the Samsung Lions.

In the 2000 season, the Lions signed All-Star veteran Kim Dong-soo and made Jin return to the backup catcher. But after Kim was put on the disabled list during the season, Jin was the starting catcher for most of 2000. In 2001, Kim came back from the injury, but Jin shared the starting position behind the plate with Kim without being the backup again.

Upon Kim Dong-soo's departure through free agency to the SK Wyverns in the winter of 2001, Jin earned the full-time position behind the plate for the Lions.

As the Lions' No. 1 catcher, Jin led his team to the 2002, 2005 and 2006 Korean Series champions.

He played for South Korea at the 2006 World Baseball Classic, and led his team to the bronze medal, sharing the starting position behind the plate with Hong Sung-heon and Cho In-sung.

In 2008, Jin was selected for the South Korea national baseball team to compete in the Beijing Olympic Games. In Beijing, he played in the first five games as a starting catcher. However, after the game against Chinese Taipei, he was out of the starting lineup because of a hamstring injury. In the gold medal game against Cuba, Jin was unexpectedly sent back behind the plate right after his fellow catcher Kang Min-ho was ejected by the plate umpire for arguing strikes and balls in the bottom of the ninth inning, and contributed to escaping the one-out bases-loaded jam by inducing a game-ending double play along with closer Chong Tae-hyon to edge Cuba 3-2.

=== Notable international careers ===
Year	Venue	Competition	Team	Individual note
1998	Thailand	Asian Games	Gold medal	.250 BA (2-for-8), 1 RBI
2003	Japan	Asian Baseball Championship	Bronze medal	.143 BA (1-for-7), 1 RBI
2006	United States	World Baseball Classic	Bronze medal	.091 BA (1-for-11)
2008	Chinese Taipei	Final Olympic Qualification Tournament	Silver medal	.235 BA (4-for-17), 4 RBI
2008	China	Olympic Games	Gold medal	.100 BA (1-for-10)
