= Jung Eun-won =

South Korean baseball player (born 2000)

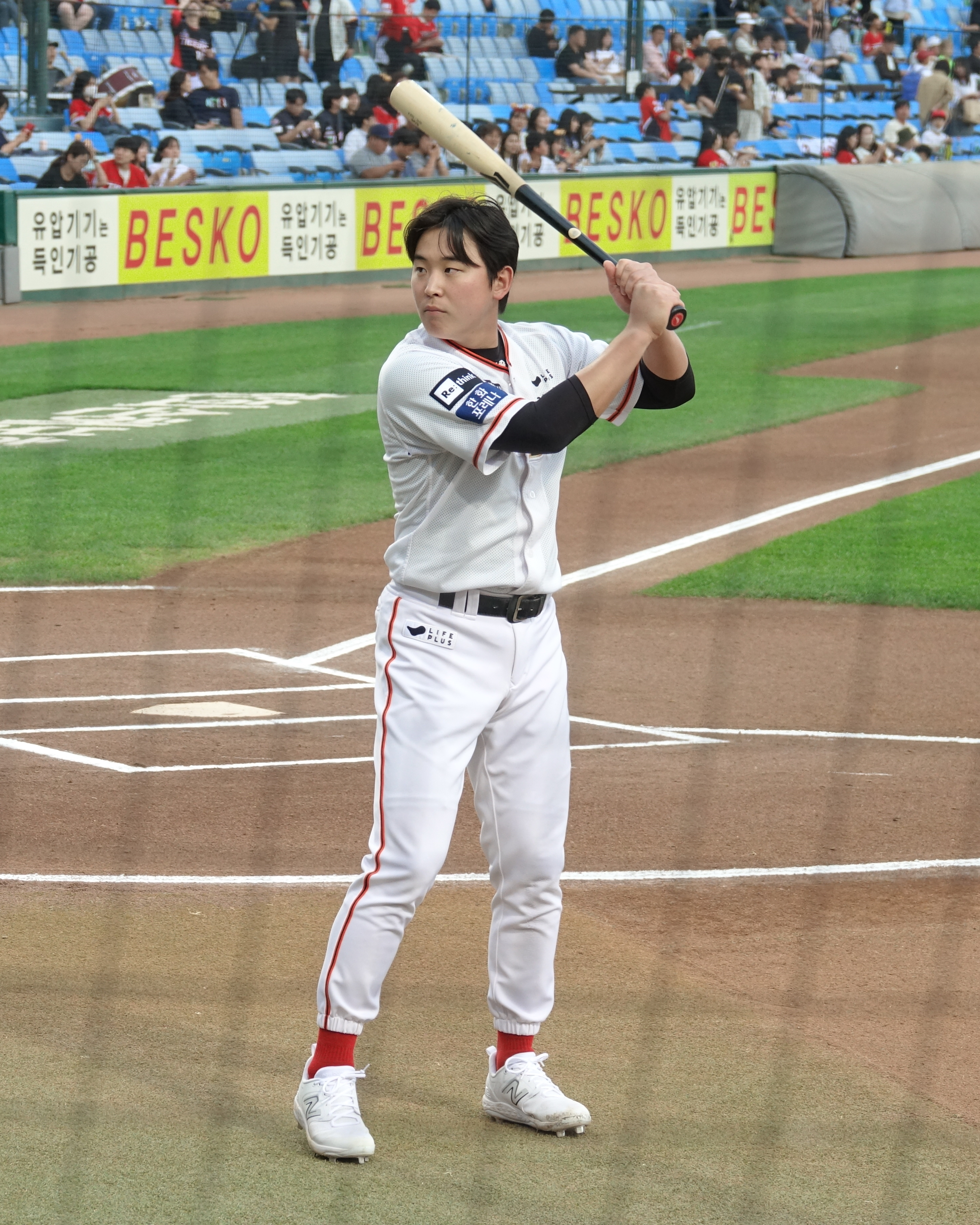

Hanwha Eagles – No. 43
- Second baseman
- Born: January 17, 2000 (age 26); Incheon, South Korea
- Bats: Left Throws: Right

KBO debut
- April 1, 2018, for the Hanwha Eagles

KBO statistics (through May 18, 2024)
- Batting average: .258
- Home runs: 32
- Runs batted ins: 230
- Stats at Baseball Reference

Teams
- Hanwha Eagles (2018–present)

Career highlights and awards
- KBO Golden Glove Award (2021)

Jung Eun-won (Korean: 정은원; born January 17, 2000, in Incheon) is a South Korean second baseman for the Hanwha Eagles of the KBO League.
