= Kim Jae-bak =

South Korean baseball player and manager

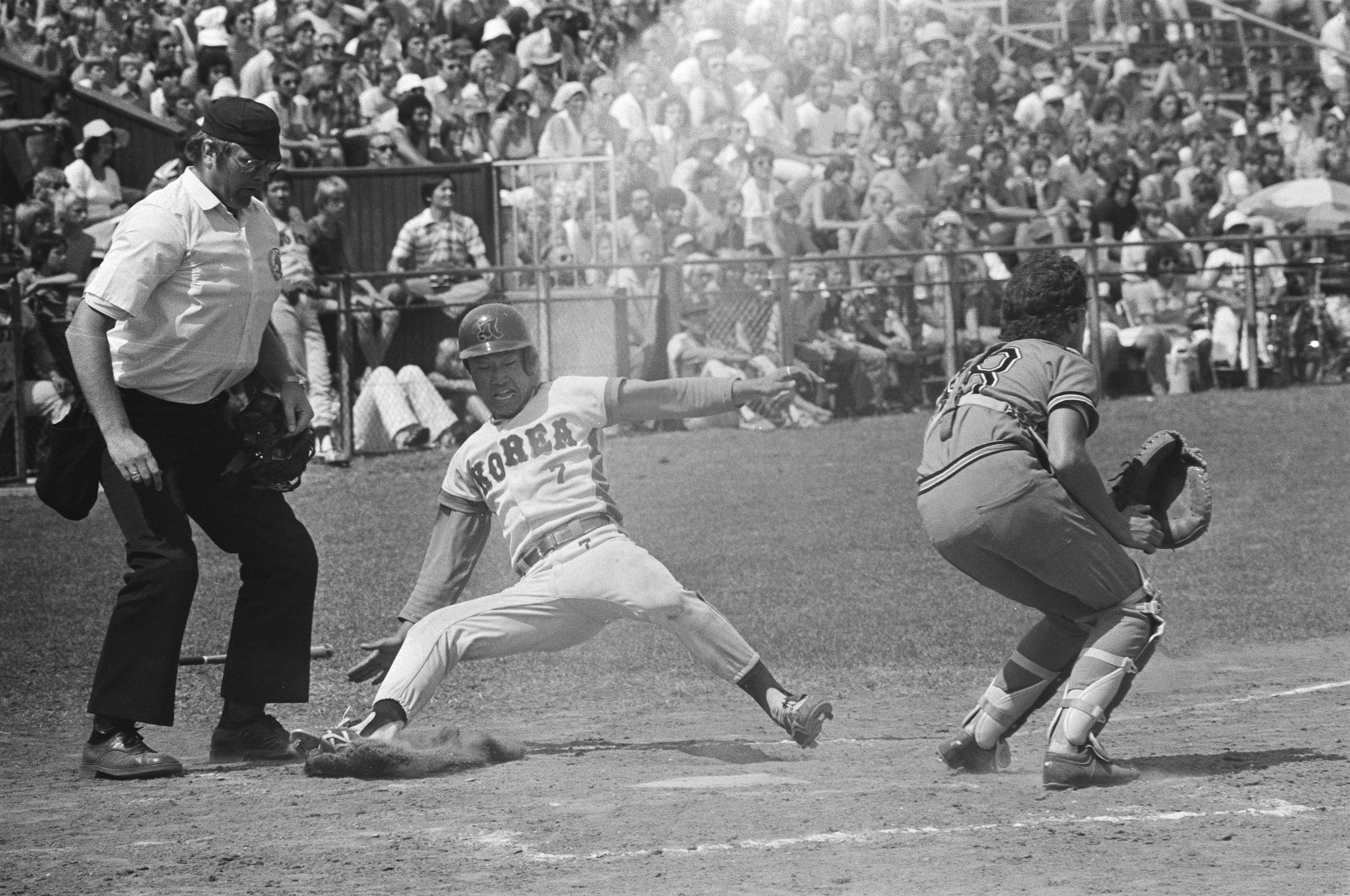
- Shortstop / Manager
- Born: May 23, 1954 (age 72)
- Batted: Right Threw: Right

KBO debut
- 1982, for the MBC Cheongryong

Last appearance
- 1992, for the Pacific Dolphins

KBO statistics
- Batting average: .273
- Home runs: 28
- RBI: 321
- Stolen bases: 284
- Stats at Baseball Reference

Teams
- As player: MBC Cheongryong/LG Twins (1982–1991); Pacific Dolphins (1992); As coach: Pacific Dolphins (1993–1995); As manager: Hyundai Unicorns (1996–2006); LG Twins (2007–2009)

Career highlights and awards
- 5x Golden Glove Award (1983, 1984, 1985, 1986, 1989); 5x Korean Series champion (1990, 1998, 2000, 2003, 2004)
Medals
Representing South Korea
Men's baseball
World Games
Silver medal – second place	1981 San Jose	Team
Baseball World Cup
Gold medal – first place	1982 Seoul	Team

- Kim Jae-bak
- Hangul: 김재박
- Hanja: 金在博
- RR: Gim Jaebak
- MR: Kim Chaebak

Kim Jae-bak (Korean: 김재박; born May 23, 1954, in Seoul, South Korea) is a South Korean former professional baseball shortstop and manager. Nicknamed the "Ground Fox," he batted and threw right-handed. He played ten seasons in the KBO League, for the MBC Cheongryong/LG Twins from 1982 to 1991, and for the Pacific Dolphins in 1992. As manager of the Hyundai Unicorns from 1996 to 2006, he guided the team to four Korean Series championships.

== Biography ==
Kim was born in Seoul, and attended Daegwang High School and Yeungnam University, growing to a height of 5'7" and 170 lbs.

== Playing career ==
=== Amateur career ===
Kim was a legendary amateur player, starting in high school, when his Daegwang High School team won the inaugural Bonghwang High School baseball tournament in 1971. In 1977, Kim led the South Korean amateur league in seven offensive categories — batting average, home runs, RBI, runs, stolen bases, on-base percentage, and slugging. He was on the South Korean team that won the Silver Medal at the 1981 World Games.

In 1982, Kim was called up to the South Korea national baseball team for the 1982 Amateur World Series (the predecessor to the Baseball World Cup), held in his home country. Kim led Team Korea to its first championship in the event, and was named to the tournament's All-Star team at shortstop.

=== Professional career ===
Kim was already 28 years old when the KBO League was formed in 1982. He was a speedy leadoff hitter for the MBC Cheongryong, winning the KBO League Golden Glove Award five times as the league's premier shortstop, from 1983 to 1986, and also in 1989. He led the league in stolen bases with 50 in 1985, and in runs scored in 1986 with 67.

In 1990, the Cheongryong became the LG Twins, and immediately won the Korean Series, with Kim as the starting shortstop. After a couple of down years for Kim, in 1990–1991, however, he was encouraged to retire by the Twins. After indicating he wished to continue playing, however, he was traded to the Pacific Dolphins in 1992. After another poor year, he retired after the '92 season.

Kim finished his career with 284 stolen bases.

== Managing career ==
After his retirement, Kim was immediately hired by the Dolphins as a senior coach, in which position he served from 1993 to 1995. In 1996, the franchise, now known as the Hyundai Unicorns, hired Kim as the team's manager. Kim led the Unicorns to the Korean Series in his first year, but the team lost the series to the Haitai Tigers. The Unicorns finished first in the KBO League in 1998, eventually winning the franchise's first championship. Kim's Unicorns team won the championship three more times, in 2000, 2003, and 2004.

Kim was a coach on the Gold Medal-winning South Korean national team at the 2002 Asian Games. He managed the South Korean national team which won a Bronze Medal in the 2006 Asian Games. Kim served as the hitting coach for the third-place South Korean team in the 2006 World Baseball Classic.

He left the Unicorns after the 2006 season for his original franchise, the LG Twins. At the time, his ₩1.55 billion contract was a record for a manager or coach. Kim managed the LG Twins from 2007 to 2009, but without the success he had with the Unicorns.

== See also ==
- List of KBO career stolen bases leaders
