= 1982 Amateur World Series =

Tournament details
- Country: South Korea
- Teams: 10

Final positions
- Champions: South Korea
- Runners-up: Japan
- Third place: United States
- Fourth place: Chinese Taipei

The 1982 Amateur World Series was the 27th Amateur World Series (AWS), an international men's amateur baseball tournament. The tournament was sanctioned by the International Baseball Federation (which titled it the Baseball World Cup as of the 1988 tournament). The tournament took place, for the only time, in South Korea, from 4 September to 14 September, and was won by South Korea in its first AWS victory.

There were 10 participating countries.

== Standings ==
Pos	Team	P	W	L
1	South Korea	9	8	1
2	Japan	9	7	2
3	United States	9	6	3
4	Chinese Taipei	9	6	3
5	Canada	9	5	4
6	Netherlands	9	3	6
7	Panama	9	3	6
8	Dominican Republic	9	3	6
9	Australia	9	2	7
10	Italy	9	2	7

== Awards ==
The IBAF announced the following awards at the completion of the tournament.

All Star Team
Position	Player
Best right-handed pitcher	(South Korea) Sun Dong-Yeol
Best left-hand pitcher	(Canada) Rod Heisler
Catcher	(Canada) Larry Downes
First Base	(Italy) Edolrdo Orrizzi
Second Base	(Netherlands) Charles Urbanus Jr.
Third Base	(Chinese Taipei) Lin Fua-wei
Shortstop	(South Korea) Kim Jae-bak
Outfield	(United States) Jordan Berge
Outfield	(Chinese Taipei) George Chao
Outfield	(Canada) Doug McPhail
Designated Hitter	(Japan) Kunio Takesue

Tournament Awards
Award	Player
MVP	(South Korea) Sun Dong-Yeol
Leading Batter	(Chinese Taipei) George Chao
Best Earned Run Average (Pitcher)	(South Korea) Lim Ho-Kyun
Most Wins (Pitcher)	(South Korea) Sun Dong-Yeol
Most Runs Batted In	(Japan) Kunio Takesue
Most Home Runs	(Japan) Kunio Takesue
Most Stolen Bases	(Japan) Mitsugu Kobayashi
Most Runs Scored	(United States) Robert Cobb

== Notable players ==
- (United States) Darrel Akerfelds
- (United States) Mike Brumley
- (United States) Mike Capel
- (United States) Wally Joyner
- (United States) Chris Sabo
- (United States) Bill Swift
- (Australia) Philip Dale
- (Dominican Republic) Félix Fermín
- (Dominican Republic) Ramón Peña
- (South Korea) Choi Dong-Won
- (South Korea) Han Dae-hwa
- (South Korea) Kim Jae-bak
- (South Korea) Sun Dong-Yeol
- (Chinese Taipei) Kuo Tai-yuan
