= List of KBO career strikeout leaders =

The following is the current leaderboard for career strikeouts in KBO League Korean baseball.

== Players with 1,200 or more strikeouts ==
**Bold**	denotes active player. (Note: A player is considered inactive if he has announced his retirement or not played for a full season.)

- Stats updated at the end of the 2026 season.

Rank	Player	Strikeouts
1	**Yang Hyeon-jong**	2,270 (↑85)
2	Song Jin-woo	2,048
3	**Kim Kwang-hyun**	2,020 (0)
4	Lee Kang-chul	1,751
5	Sun Dong-yeol	1,698
6	Jung Min-cheul	1,661
7	**Ryu Hyun-jin**	1,610 (↑115)
8	Lim Chang-yong	1,474
9	Bae Young-soo	1,436
10	Park Myung-hwan	1,421
11	Cha Woo-chan	1,413
12	Chang Won-jun	1,385
13	Kim Soo-kyung	1,370
14	Yun Sung-hwan	1,357
15	Han Yong-deok	1,344
16	**Park Se-woong**	1,331 (↑127)
17	Chung Min-tae	1,278
18	Kim Won-hyeong	1,246
19	Song Seung-jun	1,238
20	Kim Sang-jin	1,237
21	Lee Sang-mok	1,231
22	Koo Dae-sung	1,221
23	**Lee Jae-hak**	1,218 (↑13)
24	**Im Chan-kyu**	1,214 (↑102)
25	Ju Hyeong-kwang	1,209
26	Jang Won-sam	1,201

== See also ==
- List of KBO career saves leaders
- List of KBO career win leaders
- List of KBO career home run leaders
- List of KBO career RBI leaders
- List of KBO career stolen bases leaders
- List of KBO career hits leaders
