= Na Sung-bum =

South Korean baseball player (born 1989)

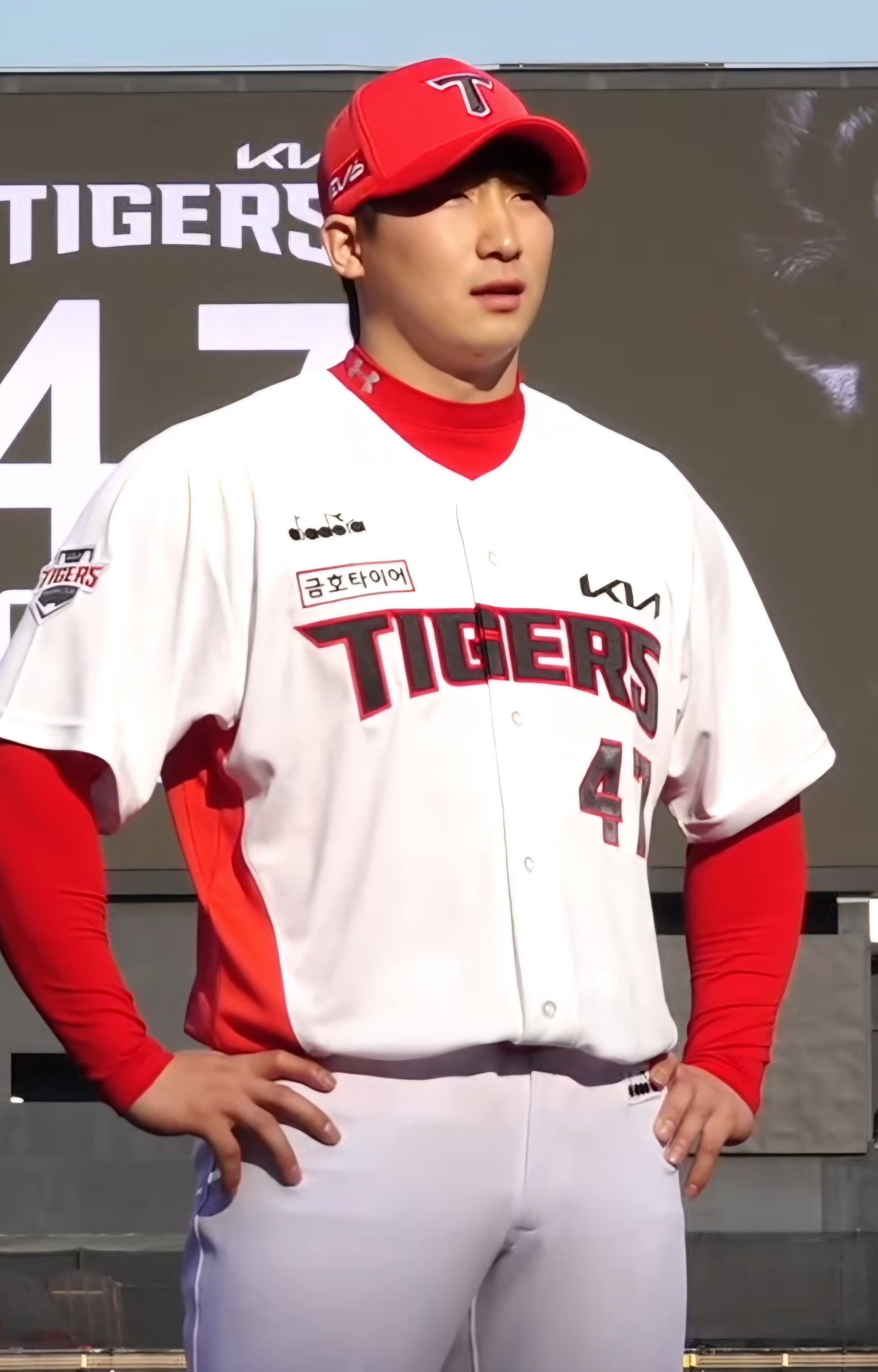
- Na with the Kia Tigers

Kia Tigers – No. 47
- Outfielder
- Born: October 3, 1989 (age 36); Gwangju, South Korea
- Bats: Left Throws: Left

KBO debut
- May 7, 2013, for the NC Dinos

KBO statistics (through 2025 season)
- Batting average: .312
- Home runs: 282
- Runs batted in: 1,100
- Stolen bases: 100
- Stats at Baseball Reference

Teams
- NC Dinos (2013–2021); Kia Tigers (2022–present)

Career highlights and awards
- 6× KBO All-Star (2013–2018); 3× KBO Golden Glove Award (2014–2015, 2022)
Medals
Men's baseball
Representing South Korea
2015 WBSC Premier12
Gold medal – first place	2015 Tokyo	Team

- Na Sung-bum
- Hangul: 나성범
- Hanja: 羅成範
- RR: Na Seongbeom
- MR: Na Sŏngbŏm

Na Sung-bum (Korean: 나성범, born October 3, 1989) is a South Korean outfielder for the Kia Tigers of the KBO League. He bats and throws left-handed. Na was selected tenth overall by the NC Dinos in the 2012 KBO Draft.

== Amateur career ==
While attending Yonsei University, Na was considered the best hitting pitcher in the South Korean collegiate baseball league. As a freshman in 2008 Na batted a team-leading .329 with 11 RBI and posted a 3–1 record and a 1.70 ERA with 83 strikeouts (runner-up in the collegiate league) in 74.0 innings pitched.

As a sophomore in 2009 Na led the collegiate league in home runs (4) as a cleanup hitter and amassed 7 wins (2 complete games – 1 shutout) with a 2.93 ERA as a starting pitcher. Also, he was runner-up in strikeouts (76) and third in RBI (23). After the season, he was selected for the South Korea national baseball team and participated in the 2009 Asian Baseball Championship as a designated hitter and relief pitcher.

As a senior in 2011, Na struggled a bit, posting a career-worst 3.76 ERA, but fanned 68 batters. In September 2011, Na was called up to the South Korean national team again for the 2011 Baseball World Cup held in Panama.

=== Notable international careers ===
Year	Venue	Competition	Team	Individual note
2009	(Japan)	Asian Baseball Championship	Bronze medal	.182 (2-for 11), 1 RBI, 1 R 0–0; 13.50 ERA (2 G, 2.0 IP, 3 ER, 0 K)
2010	(United States)	Korea vs USA Baseball Championship	0W-5L	0–1; 3.38 ERA (3 G, 5.1 IP, 2 ER, 4 K)
2010	(Japan)	World University Baseball Championship	4th	0–1; 11.12 ERA (3 G, 5.2 IP, 7 ER, 9 K)
2011	(Panama)	Baseball World Cup	6th	0–0; 6.48 ERA (5 G, 8.1 IP, 6 ER, 10 K)

== Professional career ==
Na Sung-bum originally was drafted by the NC Dinos as a pitcher, but changed his position to outfielder after a suggestion from Dinos manager Kim Kyung-moon. In 2012, he played 94 games in the farm league, finishing with a .303 batting average, 16 home runs, and 67 RBI. He won RBI leaders and Home Run Title.

In his first full season the next year, when he hit 14 home runs with a .243 batting average and 64 RBI, Na was runner-up in the KBO Rookie of the Year voting, behind team fellow Lee Jae-hak.

Na broke out in 2014 when he hit 30 home runs, batted .329 and drove in 101 runs, and quickly became a favorite of the Dinos' organization and a household name among the team's fans, voted the top competition at the KBO All-Star voting. He garnered 968,013 votes from fans and another 193 votes from KBO coaches and fellow players to lead the 22 All-Star starters.

Na maintained his status as one of the league's elite power-hitting outfielders in 2015, when finished ninth in the league with a .326 batting average, drove in 135 runs (fourth in the league) and slugged 28 home runs (seventh in the league).

Despite getting off to a hot start on the 2016 season, cold streaks in the second half of the year ruined chances of Na putting together a great year. However, he finished the year with respectable offensive numbers, finishing the year with 22 home runs, 113 RBI and a .309 batting average.

He suffered a cruciate ligament injury in the 2019 season.

After the 2021 season, Na signed a six-year contract for ₩15 billion the KIA Tigers.

=== Notable international careers ===
Year	Venue	Competition	Team	Individual note
2014	(South Korea)	Asian Games	Gold medal	.400 (8-for 20), 6 RBI, 7 R, 2 SB
2015	(Japan)	Premier12	Gold medal	.091 (1-for 11), 1 R

== See also ==
- List of KBO career home run leaders
- List of KBO career RBI leaders
