= Han Dae-hwa =

South Korean baseball player and manager

- Third baseman
- Born: July 8, 1960 (age 65)
- Batted: Right Threw: Right

KBO debut
- 1983, for the OB Bears

Last KBO appearance
- 1997, for the Ssangbangwool Raiders

KBO statistics
- Batting average: .279
- Home Runs: 163
- Runs batted in: 712
- Hits: 1,190
- Stats at Baseball Reference

Teams
- As player: OB Bears (1983–1985); Haitai Tigers (1986–1993); LG Twins (1994–1996); Ssangbangwool Raiders (1997); As coach: Samsung Lions (2003–2009); Kia Tigers (2013–2014); As manager: Hanwha Eagles (2010–2012)

Career highlights and awards
- 8× KBO Golden Glove Award winner (1986, 1987, 1988, 1989, 1990, 1991, 1993, 1994); 6× Korean Series winner (1986, 1987, 1988, 1989, 1991, 1994); 1988 KBO All-Star Game MVP; 1990 KBO Batting title

- Han Dae-hwa
- Hangul: 한대화
- Hanja: 韓大化
- RR: Han Daehwa
- MR: Han Taehwa

Han Dae-hwa (Korean: 한대화; Hanja: 韓大化; born July 8, 1960, in Daejeon, South Korea) is a former South Korean third baseman and the former manager of the Hanwha Eagles in the Korea Baseball Organization. Han played 17 years in the KBO League, for the OB Bears, the Haitai Tigers, the LG Twins, and the Ssangbangwool Raiders. He was an eight-time KBO League Golden Glove Award-winner and a six-time Korean Series champion.

== Career ==
Han attended Dongguk University.

Han was part of the Gold Medal-winning South Korea national baseball team in the 1982 Amateur World Series (the predecessor to the Baseball World Cup), held in his home country.

Han was the Most Valuable Player of the 1988 KBO League All Star Game. He won the KBO League batting title in 1990, with an average of .335. That year he finished second in the league in runs, hits, RBI, and walks.

Over his career, Han won eight KBO League Golden Glove Awards — mostly as a member of the Haitai Tigers — the most of any third baseman. His teams won the Korean Series six teams — five times with the Tigers and once with the Twins.

After retiring as a player, Han went on to be a coach for the Samsung Lions from 2003 to 2009. He managed the Hanwha Eagles from 2010 to 2012, but the team never finished higher than sixth-place during his tenure. Han returned to the Kia Tigers as a coach from 2013 to 2014.
