= Kim Yong-hee (baseball) =

South Korean baseball player (born 1955)

- Infielder / Manager
- Born: October 4, 1955 (age 70); Busan
- Batted: Right Threw: Right

KBO debut
- March 28, 1982, for the Lotte Giants

Last appearance
- August 20, 1989, for the Lotte Giants

KBO statistics
- Batting average: .270
- Home runs: 61
- Hits: 482
- RBI: 260
- Stats at Baseball Reference

Teams
- As player: Lotte Giants (1982–1989); As coach: Lotte Giants (1989–1992, 2001–2006); Samsung Lions (1999); SK Wyverns (2012–2013); As manager: Lotte Giants (1994–1998); Samsung Lions (2000); SK Wyverns (2015–2016)

Career highlights and awards
- 3x KBO League Golden Glove Award (1982, 1983, 1985)

- Kim Yong-hee
- Hangul: 김용희
- Hanja: 金用熙
- RR: Gim Yonghui
- MR: Kim Yonghŭi

Kim Yong-hee (born October 4, 1955, in Busan) is a retired player and former manager in the KBO League.

A graduate of Kyungnam High School and Korea University, Kim played for the silver medal-winning South Korea national baseball team at the 1981 World Games.

With the formation of the KBO League in 1982, Kim joined the Lotte Giants, for whom he played all eight seasons of his career. He won the KBO League Golden Glove Award three times, twice at third base and once at designated hitter.

After retiring at age 33 in 1989, Kim got directly into coaching, also for the Giants. He coached for the Giants at the KBO level from 1989 to 1992, and was promoted to the team's manager in 1994. He left the Giants after the 1998 season to coach for the Samsung Lions; he was the Lions' manager for the 2000 season.

Kim returned to Lotte as a coach from 2001 to 2006; he served as caretaker manager for part of 2002.

After leaving the KBO for a while, Kim joined the SK Wyverns as a coach for 2012–2013. He was the manager of the Wyverns in 2015–2016.
