= Baseball at the 1981 World Games =

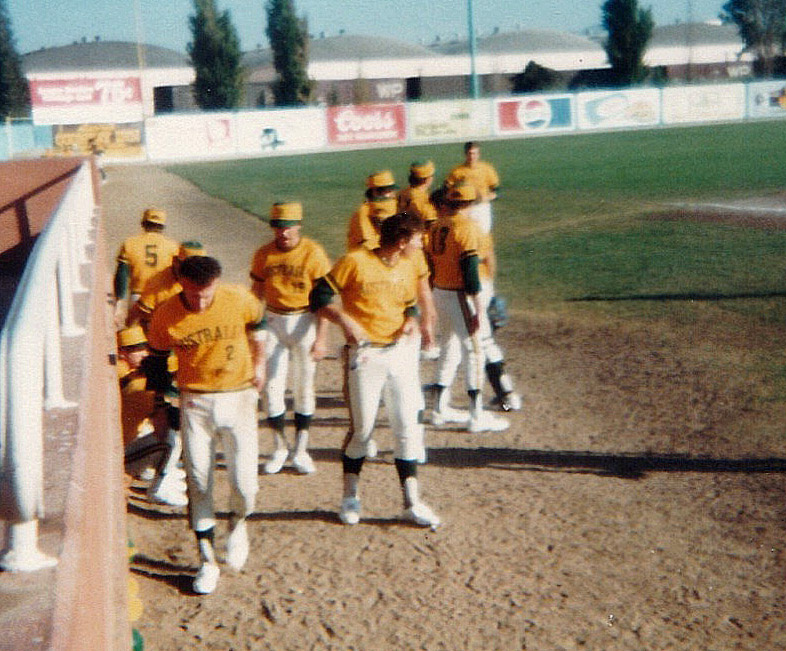
Australia's baseball team at World Games I in 1981 at San Jose Municipal Stadium

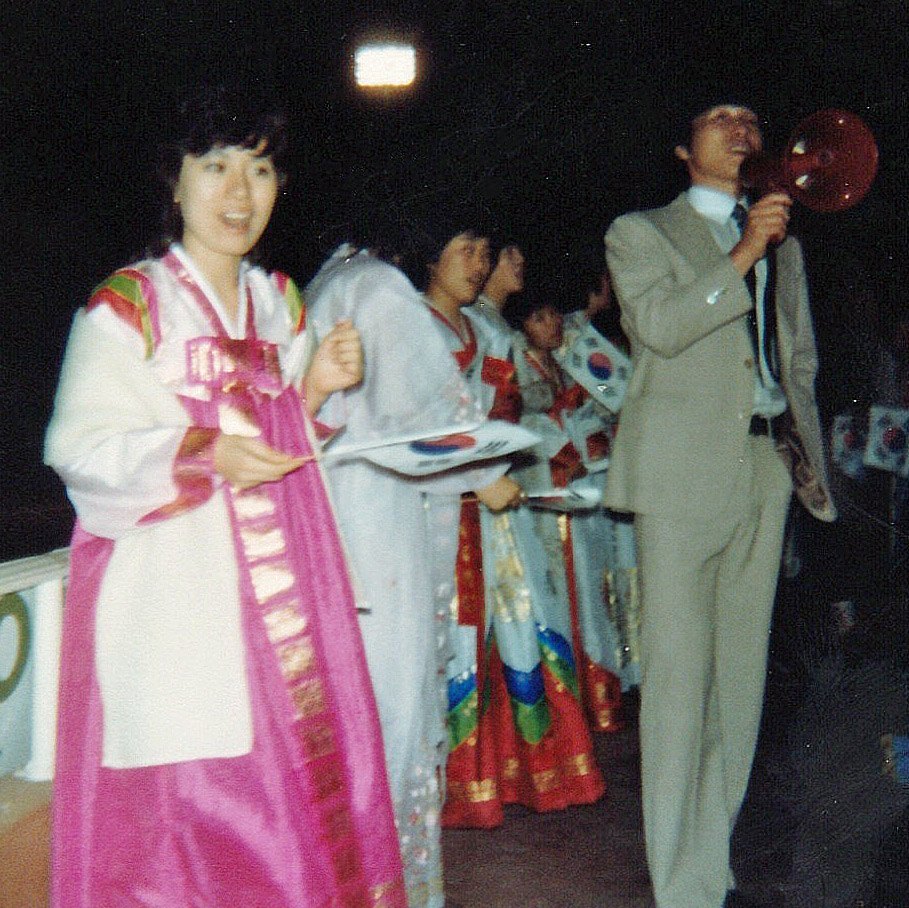
Korean baseball fans cheer for their team at World Games I.

The World Games I baseball competition was held on July 27–30, 1981, at San Jose Municipal Stadium in San Jose, California. The 1981 Games were the first World Games, an international quadrennial multi-sport event, and were held in California's Santa Clara Valley. Teams from the United States, Australia, South Korea and Panama participated.

== Medalists ==
Gold	Silver	Bronze
United States Bob Batesole; Pat Clements; Mike Dotterer; Burk Goldthorn; Bruce Johnson; Dan Jones Jr. Todd Lamb; Gregg Lomnicky; Tony Mack; Oddibe McDowell; Spike Owen; Jim Paciorek; John Russell; Augie Schmidt; Howard Simmons; Dave Stenhouse Jr. Franklin Stubbs; Mike Toothman; Ed Vosberg; Brian Wolcott	South Korea Bae Dae-woong; Cheon Bo-seong; Choi Dong-won; Ha Ki-ryong; Hwang Kyu-bong; Im Ho-kyun; Jang Hyo-jo; Kim Bong-yeon; Kim Il-kwon; Kim Jae-bak; Kim Jeong-soo; Kim Jin-woo; Kim Si-jin; Kim Yong-hee; Lee Hae-chang; Lee Seon-heui; Oh Dae-suk; Ryu Du-yeol; Sim Jae-won; Sunwoo Dae-yeong	Australia Neil Burke; Elkson; Peter Gahan; John Galloway; Hendy; Home; Mark Linger; Mazelian; McIntyre; Ray Mitchell; Orford; Graham Ward; Alan Wignall others......

== Standing ==
Team	W	L	RS	RA
United States	3	0	24	10
South Korea	2	1	19	10
Australia	1	2	13	26
Panama	0	3	12	22

== Details ==
Tuesday, July 28, 1981:

United States 9, Panama 1
South Korea 10, Australia 0

July 28 17:00 San Jose Municipal Stadium
Team	1	2	3	4	5	6	7	8	9	R	H	E
Panama	0	0	0	0	0	0	0	0	1	1	6	3
United States	2	0	2	0	2	0	1	2	X	9	12	1
WP: Todd Lamb LP: L Dominguez

July 28 20:00 San Jose Municipal Stadium
Team	1	2	3	4	5	6	7	8	9	R	H
Australia	0	0	0	0	0	0	0	0	0	0	
South Korea	0	1	1	0	3	1	4	0	X	10	11
WP: Choi Dong-won LP: ? Home runs: AUS: None; KOR: None

Wednesday, July 29, 1981:

United States 11, Australia 7
South Korea 7, Panama 6

July 29 17:00 San Jose Municipal Stadium
Team	1	2	3	4	5	6	7	8	9	R	H	E
United States	0	0	2	2	4	3	0	0	0	11	12	2
Australia	0	0	0	0	0	3	1	3	0	7	13	6
WP: Bruce Johnson LP: Orford; Home runs: USA: John Russell in 6th, 2 on AUS: None

July 29 20:00 San Jose Municipal Stadium
Team	1	2	3	4	5	6	7	8	9	R
Panama	0	0	0	0	0	1	5	0	0	6
South Korea	1	0	0	0	3	0	0	0	3	7
WP: ? LP: ?

Thursday, July 30, 1981:

Australia 6, Panama 5
United States 4, South Korea 2

July 30 17:00 San Jose Municipal Stadium
Team	1	2	3	4	5	6	7	8	9	R
Panama	2	1	0	0	0	2	0	0	0	5
Australia	1	0	0	0	0	0	3	0	2	6
WP: Ray Mitchell LP: Ronaldo Montero; Home runs: PAN: None; AUS: Peter Gahan in 9th, 1 on

July 30 20:00 San Jose Municipal Stadium
Team	1	2	3	4	5	6	7	8	9	R	H	E
South Korea	2	0	0	0	0	0	0	0	0	2	4	3
United States	0	2	0	0	0	1	1	0	X	4	8	0
WP: Ed Vosberg LP: Choi Dong-won; Home runs: KOR: None; USA: Oddibe McDowell

Other known individual participants: PAN – R Dominguez, de Leon, Proveda
