= Yang Eui-ji =

South Korean baseball player (born 1987)

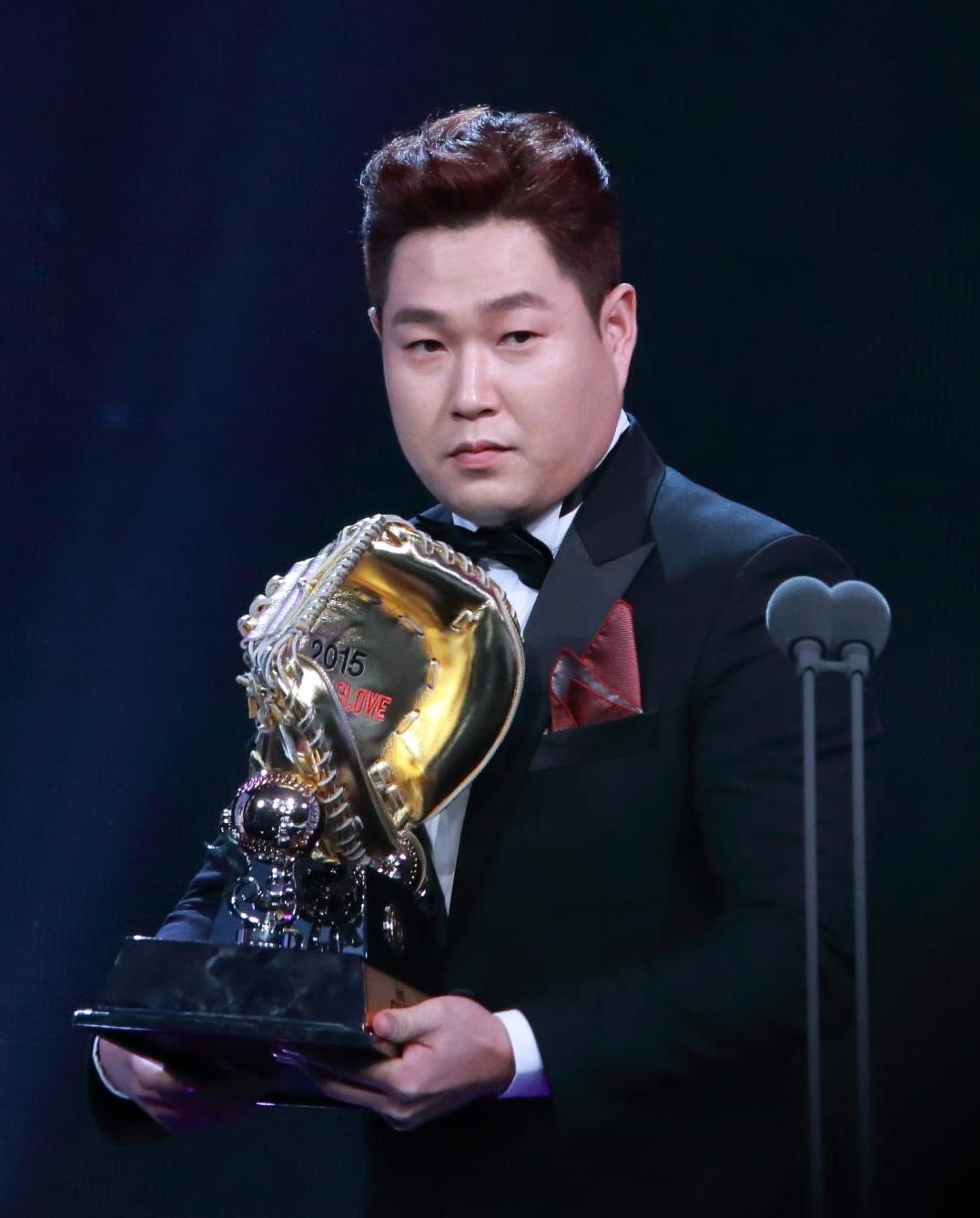
- Yang with his 2015 Golden Glove Award

Doosan Bears – No. 25
- Catcher
- Born: June 5, 1987 (age 39); Gwangju, South Korea
- Bats: Right Throws: Right

KBO debut
- 2007, for the Doosan Bears

KBO statistics (through June 13, 2026)
- Batting average: .308
- Hits: 2,021
- Home runs: 292
- Runs batted in: 1,230
- Stats at Baseball Reference

Teams
- Doosan Bears (2007); Korean Police Baseball Team (2008–2009); Doosan Bears (2010–2018); NC Dinos (2019–2022); Doosan Bears (2023–present)

Career highlights and awards
- 3× Korean Series champion (2015, 2016, 2020); 2× Korean Series MVP (2016, 2020); KBO Rookie of the Year (2010); KBO batting title (2019); 7× KBO All-Star (2016, 2018, 2020-2021, 2023-2024, 2026); KBO Home Run Derby Champion (2020); Mr. All-Star (2020); KBO RBI leader (2021); 9× KBO Golden Glove Award (2014–2016, 2018–2023); KBO Defensive Award (2023)
Medals
Men's baseball
Representing South Korea
Asian Games
Gold medal – first place	2018 Jakarta-Palembang	Team
WBSC Premier12
Gold medal – first place	2015 Tokyo	Team
Silver medal – second place	2019 Seoul	Team

- Yang Eui-ji
- Hangul: 양의지
- Hanja: 梁義智
- RR: Yang Uiji
- MR: Yang Ŭiji

Yang Eui-ji (Korean: 양의지; born June 5, 1987) is a South Korean professional baseball catcher currently playing for the Doosan Bears of the KBO League. He has won the KBO League Golden Glove Award nine times; three consecutive years from 2014 to 2016, and six consecutive years from 2018 to 2023. Yang won the Korean Series Most Valuable Player Award in 2016 and 2020.

== Professional career ==
He graduated from Gwangju Jinheung High School and joined the Doosan Bears in the second draft in 2006 (59th in the 8th round). At the time of the draft, he was not a highly touted prospect. He joined the Police Baseball Team immediately after the 2007 season and was discharged from the Police Baseball Team in 2009.

Yang won the KBO League Rookie of the Year Award in 2010 on the strength of his 20 home runs and 68 RBI.

Yang left the Bears after the 2018 season, signing as a free agent with the NC Dinos. He led the league in hitting in 2019 with a .354 batting average.

After the 2022 season, Yang returned to the Bears as a free agent on a four-year contract.

On May 19, 2026, he became the twenty-first player in KBO history to record 2,000 hits.

== International career ==
Yang represented South Korea at the 2015 WBSC Premier12, 2017 World Baseball Classic, and 2018 Asian Games. He also represented the team at the 2023 World Baseball Classic.

== See also ==
- List of KBO career home run leaders
- List of KBO career RBI leaders
- List of KBO career hits leaders
