= Lee Bum-ho =

South Korean baseball player (born 1981)

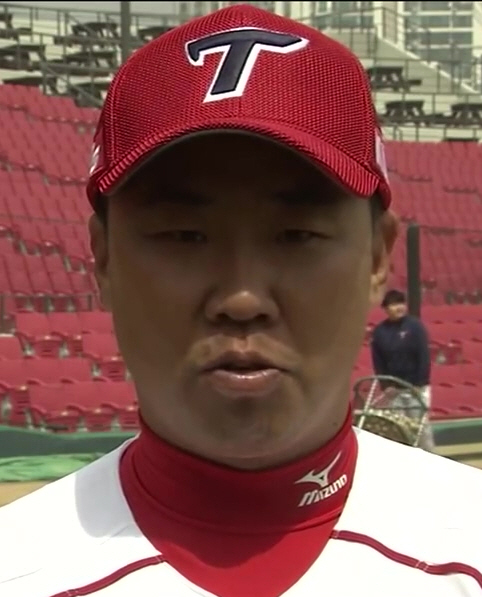

Kia Tigers – No. 25
- Third baseman
- Born: November 25, 1981 (age 44); Taegu, South Korea
- Batted: Right Threw: Right

Professional debut
- KBO: April 5, 2000, for the Hanwha Eagles
- NPB: April, 2010, for the Fukuoka SoftBank Hawks

Last appearance
- NPB: 2010, for the Fukuoka SoftBank Hawks
- KBO: 2019, for the Kia Tigers

KBO statistics
- Batting average: .271
- Home runs: 334
- RBI: 1,127

NPB statistics
- Batting average: .226
- Home runs: 4
- RBI: 8
- Stats at Baseball Reference

Teams
- As player: Hanwha Eagles (2000–2009); Fukuoka SoftBank Hawks (2010); Kia Tigers (2011–2019); As coach: Fukuoka SoftBank Hawks (2019); Philadelphia Phillies (2020); Kia Tigers 2nd Team (2021); Kia Tigers (2022–2023); As manager: Kia Tigers (2024–present)

Career highlights and awards
- KBO As player: Korean Series champion (2017); 2x KBO League Golden Glove Award (2005-2006); As manager: Korean Series champion (2024); International: All-World Baseball Classic Team (2009)
Medals
Men's baseball
Representing South Korea
World Baseball Classic
Silver medal – second place	2009 Los Angeles	Team
Bronze medal – third place	2006 San Diego	Team
Intercontinental Cup
Silver medal – second place	2002 Havana	Team

- Lee Bum-ho
- Hangul: 이범호
- Hanja: 李杋浩
- RR: I Beomho
- MR: I Pŏmho

Lee Bum-ho (Korean: 이범호; born November 25, 1981) is a South Korean former professional baseball third baseman. He played in the KBO League for the Hanwha Eagles and Kia Tigers, and in Nippon Professional Baseball (NPB) for the Fukuoka SoftBank Hawks. He bats and throws right-handed.

Lee is considered one of the best defensive third basemen in the KBO league history. He made great contributions on offense as well. He hit with considerable power, which enabled him to collect 20+ home runs nearly every season.

Lee is currently the operations manager of the Kia Tigers.

== Professional career ==
Lee made his pro debut in 2000, drafted by the Hanwha Eagles in the 2nd round (8th pick, 16th overall) of the 2000 KBO Draft.

He had a couple of mediocre seasons as a backup shortstop, but started to show signs of promise in 2002 when he batted .260 and hit 11 home runs. After the 2002 season, Lee was selected for the South Korea national baseball team for the first time and competed in the 2002 Intercontinental Cup held in Cuba. In the gold medal game, Lee hit a solo home run off Cuba's starter José Ibar in the bottom of the 4th inning to break a scoreless tie.

His stats dipped slightly in 2003, but broke out again in the 2004 season when he batted a career-high .308 with 23 home runs and 74 RBIs, playing in all 126 regular-season games as a shortstop.

In 2005, Lee moved from shortstop to third base, and hit a career-high 26 home runs with 68 RBIs. He won his first KBO League Golden Glove Award at third base, edging out Kim Dong-Joo in the balloting.

Prior to the 2006 season, Lee was called up to the South Korea national baseball team and competed in the inaugural World Baseball Classic.

From 2004 through 2007, Lee had four consecutive seasons with 20 or more home runs. In 2006, Lee won his second KBO League Golden Glove Award.

In 2008, he batted .276, hit 19 home runs, drove in 77 runs and stole a career-high 12 bases.

In March 2009, Lee competed for the South Korean national baseball team for the 2009 World Baseball Classic. For the Classic, Lee went 8-for-20 with 3 home runs, 5 runs and 7 RBIs in six games. He was fifth in RBI and tied for the lead with six others in home runs in the tournament, and named to the All-Star team at third base. In the 2009 KBO season, Lee had another solid performance, batting .284 with 25 home runs (7th in the league), 124 hits and a career-high 79 RBIs in 126 regular-season games as a third baseman.

Lee signed as a free agent with the Fukuoka SoftBank Hawks of the Japanese Pacific League in November 2009. He batted .226 in 48 games for the Hawks in 2010, with 4 home runs and 8 RBI. He hit his first NPB home run on April 9, 2010, against Nippon Ham at Fukuoka Dome in the seventh inning off Hirotoshi Masui.

On January 27, 2011, Lee returned to the KBO League, signing with the Kia Tigers.

In 2020, Lee began training with the Philadelphia Phillies.

=== Career statistics ===
Year	Team	AVG	G	AB	H	2B	3B	HR	RBI	RUN	SB	CS	BB	SO	GIDP	SF	SLG
2000	Hanwha	.162	69	74	12	7	0	1	3	11	1	0	11	21	2	1	.297
2001	Hanwha	.196	71	138	27	7	1	3	16	22	2	4	13	25	3	8	.326
2002	Hanwha	.260	111	296	77	20	2	11	35	41	5	1	27	57	5	6	.453
2003	Hanwha	.238	107	323	77	19	1	11	38	46	2	6	52	63	6	9	.406
2004	Hanwha	.308	133	481	148	35	3	23	74	80	6	3	51	80	8	9	.536
2005	Hanwha	.273	126	444	121	27	1	26	68	69	6	2	62	94	8	7	.514
2006	Hanwha	.257	126	421	108	25	1	20	73	53	0	2	72	87	11	4	.463
2007	Hanwha	.246	126	418	103	14	0	21	63	57	2	0	77	73	14	10	.431
2008	Hanwha	.276	125	434	120	21	3	19	77	80	12	1	70	50	18	4	.470
2009	Hanwha	.284	126	436	124	21	0	25	79	64	3	1	60	70	10	3	.505
Total	10 Season	.265	1120	3465	917	196	12	160	526	523	39	20	495	620	85	61	.467

=== Notable international careers ===
Year	Venue	Competition	Team	Individual note
2002	Cuba	Intercontinental Cup	Silver medal	.303 BA (10-for-33), 1 HR
2006	United States	World Baseball Classic	Bronze medal	.176 BA (3-for-17), 2 RBI, 1 R
2009	United States	World Baseball Classic	Silver medal	.400 BA (8-for-20), 3 HR, 7 RBI, 5 R All-Star (3B), HR title

== See also ==
- List of KBO career hits leaders
- List of KBO career home run leaders
- List of KBO career RBI leaders
