= Kang Min-ho =

South Korean baseball player (born 1985)

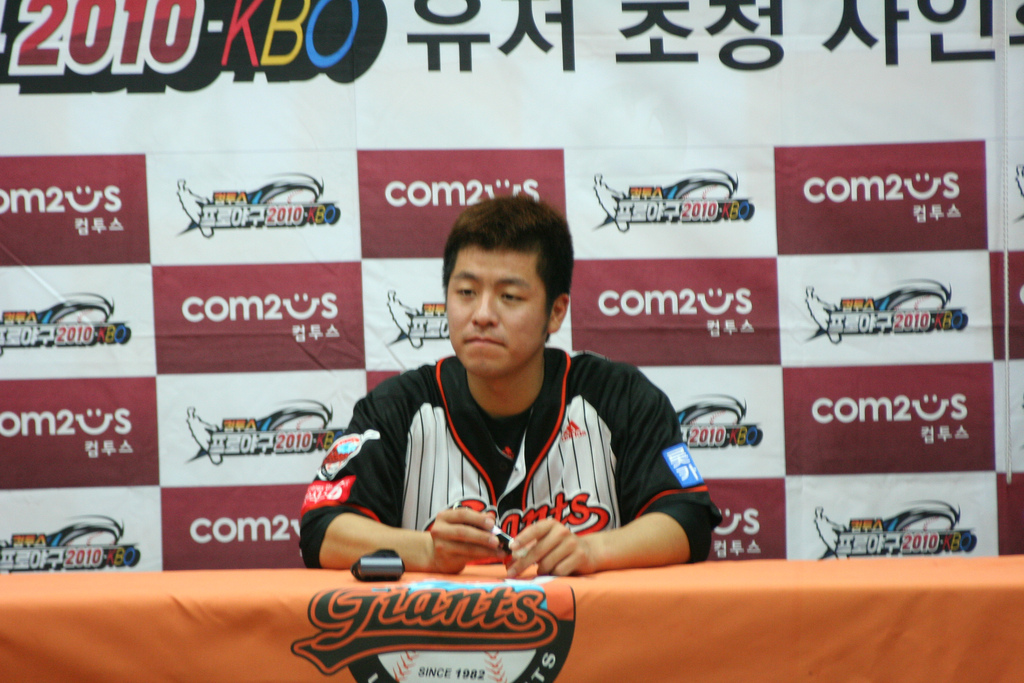

Samsung Lions – No. 47
- Catcher
- Born: August 18, 1985 (age 41)
- Bats: Right Throws: Right

KBO debut
- September 19, 2004, for the Lotte Giants

KBO statistics (through June 6, 2024)
- Batting average: .276
- Home runs: 322
- Runs batted in: 1,187
- Stats at Baseball Reference

Teams
- Lotte Giants (2004–2017); Samsung Lions (2018–present)

Career highlights and awards
- 7× KBO Golden Glove Award (2008, 2011–2013, 2017, 2021, 2024); Korean Series champion (2026)
Medals
Men's baseball
Olympics
Gold medal – first place	2008 Beijing	Team
World Baseball Classic
Silver medal – second place	2009 Los Angeles	Team
2015 WBSC Premier12
Gold medal – first place	2015 Tokyo	Team

- Kang Min-ho
- Hangul: 강민호
- Hanja: 姜珉鎬
- RR: Gang Minho
- MR: Kang Minho

Kang Min-ho (Korean: 강민호; born August 18, 1985) is a South Korean catcher who plays for the Samsung Lions in the Korea Baseball Organization. He previously played with the Lotte Giants. At the conclusion of the 2017 season, he left the Giants to join the Samsung Lions.

== Amateur career ==
Kang attended Pocheol Technical High School in Pohang. In 2003, he was selected for the South Korea national junior team and competed in the 5th Asian Junior Baseball Championship held in Bangkok, Thailand. As a starting catcher, Kang helped South Korea win their second Championship title.

=== Notable international appearances ===
Year	Venue	Competition	Team	Individual Note
2003	Thailand	Asian Junior Baseball Championship	Gold medal	

== Professional career ==
=== Lotte Giants ===
After graduation from high school, Kang made his pro debut in 2004, drafted by the Lotte Giants in the 2nd round (3rd pick, 17th overall) of the 2004 KBO draft.

In the 2006 KBO season, he became a starting catcher, appearing in all 126 regular season games. Kang was the youngest starting catcher to play all regular season games in the KBO history.

Kang offensively broke out in the 2008 season. He finished 19th in batting average (.292), 5th in home runs (19) and 6th in RBI (82), and led the Giants to their first post-season appearance since 2000. He won his first Golden Glove Award. Kang was the first catcher of all time to win a Golden Glove Award as a Giants catcher.

=== Samsung Lions ===
At the end of the 2017 season, Kang signed a contract to join the Samsung Lions. The four-year contract was valued at ₩8 billion (~US$7.3 million).

== International career ==
Kang participated in the 2008 Olympic Games held in Beijing, China, selected for the South Korea national baseball team, where he served as backup to Jin Kab-Yong. However, Jin was injured during a game against the Netherlands, and Kang took over as the starting catcher at the next game. He did a successful job for replacing an injured Jin Kab-Yong during the rest of the competition and eventually leading South Korea to the gold medal.

=== Notable international appearances ===
Year	Venue	Competition	Team	Individual Note
2006	Qatar	Asian Games	Bronze medal	.167 BA (2-for-12)
2008	China	Olympic Games	Gold medal	.273 BA (6-for-22)
2009	United States	World Baseball Classic	Silver medal	.000 BA (0-for-4)
2010	China	Guangzhou Asian Games	Gold medal	
2014	South Korea	Incheon Asian Games	Gold medal	

== Awards and honors ==
- 2008 KBO Golden Glove Award (Catcher)
- 2011 KBO Golden Glove Award (Catcher)
- 2012 KBO Golden Glove Award (Catcher)
- 2013 KBO Golden Glove Award (Catcher)
- 2017 KBO Golden Glove Award (Catcher)
- 2021 KBO Golden Glove Award (Catcher)
- 2024 KBO Golden Glove Award (Catcher)

== See also ==
- List of KBO career hits leaders
- List of KBO career home run leaders
- List of KBO career RBI leaders
