= Kim Seong-han (baseball) =

South Korean baseball player, coach, and manager

- Infielder / pitcher
- Born: May 18, 1958 (age 68); Gunsan, North Jeolla
- Batted: Right Threw: Right

KBO debut
- March 28, 1982, for the Haitai Tigers

Last appearance
- September 24, 1995, for the Haitai Tigers

Career statistics
- Batting average: .286
- Hits: 1,389
- Home runs: 207
- RBI: 781

Career statistics
- Win–loss: 15–10
- Earned run average: 3.02
- Strikeouts: 69
- Stats at Baseball Reference

Teams
- As player: Haitai Tigers (1982–1995); As coach: Haitai Tigers (1996–2000); Hanwha Eagles (2013–2014); As manager: Kia Tigers (2001–2004)

Career highlights and awards
- 2x KBO League MVP (1985, 1988); 6x Golden Glove Award (1985, 1986, 1987, 1988, 1989, 1990, 1991); 3x KBO home run title (1985, 1988, 1989); 7x Korean Series champion (1983, 1986, 1987, 1988, 1989, 1991, 1993)

- Kim Seong-han
- Hangul: 김성한
- Hanja: 金城漢
- RR: Gim Seonghan
- MR: Kim Sŏnghan

Kim Seong-han (Korean: 김성한; born May 18, 1958) is a retired South Korean professional baseball infielder and pitcher who played for the Haitai Tigers of the KBO League. Kim played all 14 seasons for the Tigers, winning the KBO League Most Valuable Player Award twice, in 1985 and 1988. He was the first KBO player to hit 30 home runs in a season. Kim was considered the best first basemen in the KBO from 1985 to 1991, winning the KBO League Golden Glove Award every year at that position. His Haitai Tigers won seven Korean Series titles with him as a player.

Kim attended Dongguk University.

== Playing career ==
An infielder for most of his career, Kim was also a pitcher for his first few seasons. His most frequent appearance as a pitcher was in 1982, his first year in the league (and incidentally the first year of the KBO), when he went 10–5 with a 2.79 ERA. As a hitter that year, he batted .305 with 13 home runs and 69 runs batted in, leading the league in RBI.

In 1985, Kim won his first MVP award, hitting .333 with a league-leading 22 home runs and 75 RBI, second in the league. That year he also led the KBO in hits with 133 and doubles with 29.

In 1988, Kim won his second MVP award, hitting .333 (third in the league), smacking a league-leading 30 home runs and 89 RBI, and leading the Tigers to their fourth KBO championship. His 30 home runs that year was the first time anyone in the KBO League had reached the 30-homer milestone (particularly impressive because the season was only 108 games).

In 1989, Kim won his third home run title, with 26, and also led the league in runs with 93 and walks with 84.

Kim was the first KBO player with multiple MVP Awards and is one of only five players in KBO League history to win the MVP Award more than once.

== Coaching career ==
After retiring as a player in 1995, Kim stayed on as a Tigers coach from 1996 to 2000. He was the Tigers' manager from 2001 to 2004, during which time the team made it to the playoffs three out of four years.

Kim was the bench coach of the runner-up South Korean national team in the 2009 World Baseball Classic.

Kim worked as a coach for the Hanwha Eagles from 2013 to 2014.

== See also ==
- List of KBO career home run leaders
