= Choi Hyoung-woo =

South Korean baseball player (born 1983)

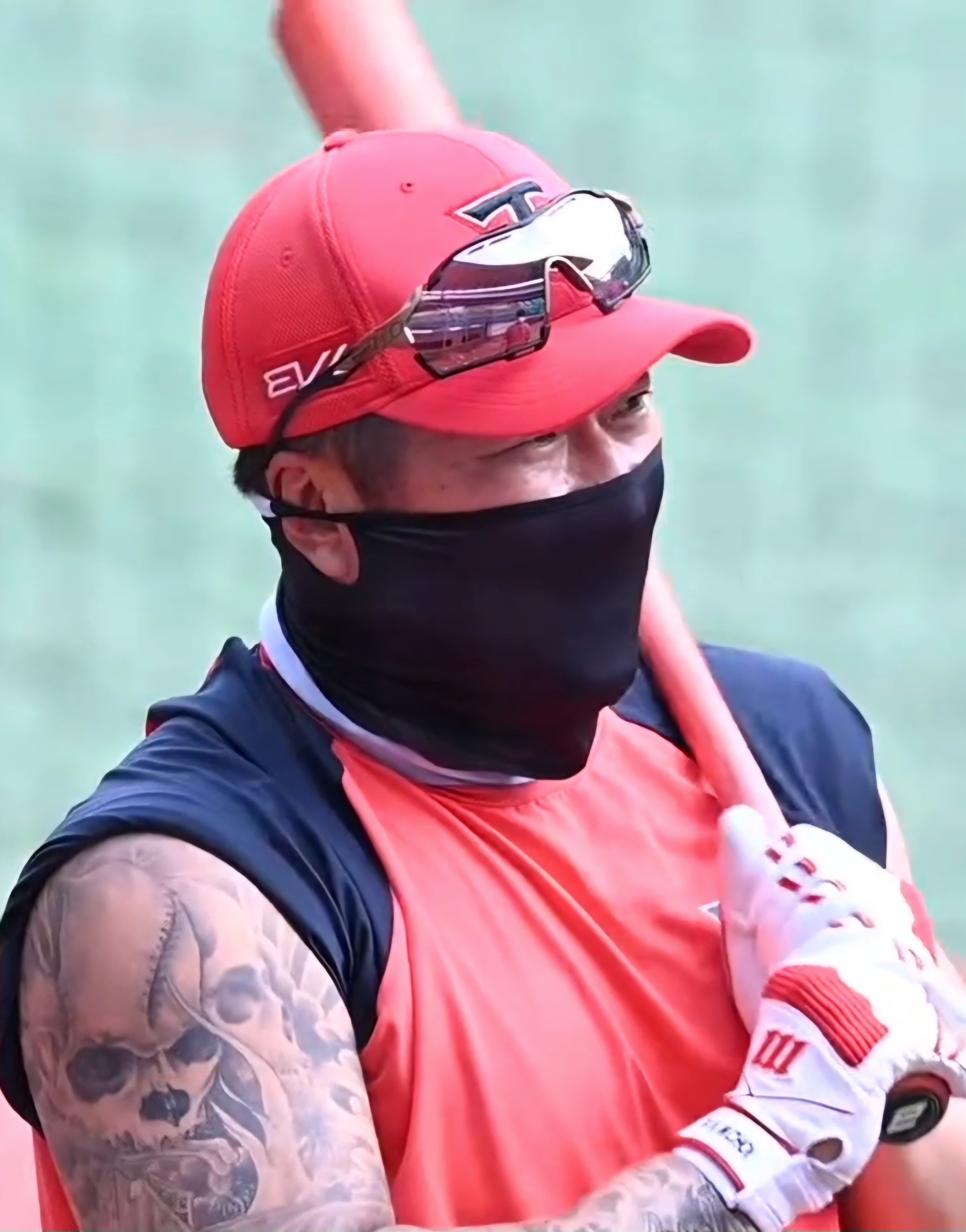
- Choi with the Kia Tigers

Samsung Lions – No. 34
- Outfielder
- Born: December 16, 1983 (age 42); Jeonju, North Jeolla, South Korea
- Bats: Left Throws: Right

KBO debut
- October 14, 2002, for the Samsung Lions

KBO statistics (through July 21, 2026)
- Batting average: .311
- Hits: 2,685
- Home runs: 431
- Runs batted in: 1,804
- Stats at Baseball Reference

Teams
- Samsung Lions (2002, 2004); Police Baseball Team (2006–2007) (army); Samsung Lions (2008–2016); Kia Tigers (2017–2025); Samsung Lions (2026–present)

Career highlights and awards
- 7x Korean Series champion (2011, 2012, 2013, 2014, 2017, 2024, 2026); KBO Rookie of the Year (2008); 9× KBO All-Star (2011, 2015-2017, 2022-2026); 8× KBO Golden Glove Award (2011, 2013–2014, 2016–2017, 2020, 2024-2025); 2× KBO batting champion (2016, 2020); KBO home run leader (2011); 2× KBO RBI leader (2011, 2016); Mr. All-Stars (2024); Cycling Hit (2016); KBO records: First 2,700 Hits (2026); Oldest Stolen base & Homerun (2026); Oldest Hits, RBI, Run & Homerun in postseason (2026)

- Choi Hyoung-woo
- Hangul: 최형우
- Hanja: 崔炯宇
- RR: Choe Hyeongu
- MR: Ch'oe Hyŏngu

Choi Hyoung-woo (born December 16, 1983) is a South Korean professional baseball outfielder who plays for the Samsung Lions of the KBO League.

Choi played for the Samsung Lions from 2002 through 2016. Drafted as a catcher, his career got off to a slow start, as he didn't record an RBI in the KBO until 2008. Released by the Lions after the 2005 season, he played for the KBO Futures League farm league Police Baseball Team in 2006 and 2007. While with the Police, Choi switched from catcher to outfielder.

His professional career truly began when he rejoined Samsung in 2008. That year he was named KBO Rookie of the Year. He led the KBO League in home runs (30) and RBIs (118) in 2011, and in batting average (.376) and RBIs (144) in 2016.

In November 2016, he signed a four-year free-agent contract with the Kia Tigers, becoming the first player in KBO history to receive a 10 billion won ($8.5 million) contract.

After the 2025 season, he returned to the Lions, signing a two-year free-agent contract.

== See also ==
- List of KBO career hits leaders
- List of KBO career home run leaders
- List of KBO career RBI leaders
