= Chung Min-tae =

South Korean baseball player and coach (born 1970)

Hanwha Eagles
- Pitcher / Coach
- Born: March 1, 1970 (age 55); Incheon, South Korea
- Batted: Right Threw: Right

debut
- 1992, for the Pacific Dolphins

Last appearance
- April 18, 2008, for the Kia Tigers

KBO statistics
- Win–loss: 124–96
- Earned run average: 3.48
- Strikeouts: 1,278

Teams
- As player: Pacific Dolphins / Hyundai Unicorns (1992–2000); Yomiuri Giants (2001–2002); Hyundai Unicorns (2003–2007); Kia Tigers (2008); As coach: Nexen Heroes (2008–2012); Lotte Giants (2013–2014); Hanwha Eagles (2015–present)

Career highlights and awards
- 3× KBO Golden Glove Award winner (1998, 1999, 2003); 3× Korean Series champion (2000, 2003, 2004); 2× Korean Series MVP (2000, 2003)
Medals
Representing South Korea
Olympic Games
Bronze medal – third place	2000 Sydney	Team

- Chung Min-tae
- Hangul: 정민태
- Hanja: 鄭珉台
- RR: Jeong Mintae
- MR: Chŏng Mint'ae

Chung Min-tae (Korean: 정민태; Hanja: 鄭珉台; born March 1, 1970) is a former pitcher in the KBO League and Nippon Professional Baseball, and the current pitching coach of the Hanwha Eagles.

While attending Hanyang University, he competed for South Korea national baseball team in numerous international baseball competitions. After the amateur career, Chung played for the Pacific Dolphins / Hyundai Unicorns (1992–2000, 2003–2007) and Kia Tigers (2008) in the Korea Baseball Organization. In 2001, he signed with the Yomiuri Giants to play in Nippon Professional Baseball for two years.

He was one of the top pitchers in the KBO in the period 1998 to 2003, winning the KBO League Golden Glove Award three times during that span. He led the league in victories in three separate years — 1999, 2000, and 2003 — topping 20 victories in 1999. His Unicorns team won the Korean Series championship three times during that period, with Chung winning the Korean Series Most Valuable Player Award twice, in 2000 and 2003.

== See also ==
- List of KBO career win leaders
- List of KBO career strikeout leaders
