= Shim Jeong-soo =

South Korean baseball player

- Outfielder
- Born: May 5, 1975 (age 50); Daejeon
- Batted: Right Threw: Right

KBO debut
- 1994, for the OB Bears

Last appearance
- April 24, 2008, for the Samsung Lions

KBO statistics
- Batting average: .287
- Hits: 1,451
- Home runs: 328
- RBI: 1,029
- Stats at Baseball Reference

Teams
- Doosan Bears (1994–2000); Hyundai Unicorns (2001–2004); Samsung Lions (2005–2008)

Career highlights and awards
- 5x Korean Series champion (1995, 2003, 2004, 2005, 2006); 3x KBO League Golden Glove Award (2002, 2003, 2007)

- Shim Jeong-soo
- Hangul: 심정수
- Hanja: 沈正洙
- RR: Sim Jeongsu
- MR: Sim Chŏngsu

Shim Jeong-soo (born May 5, 1975) is a former South Korean professional baseball outfielder who played for the Doosan Bears, the Hyundai Unicorns, and the Samsung Lions of the KBO League. A power hitter, Shim's teams won the Korean Series five teams — once with the Bears, twice with the Unicorns, and twice with the Lions. In fact, Shim's teams won four consecutive KBO championships from 2003 to 2006.

Shim's two best seasons were in 2002 and 2003 for the Unicorns. In 2002, he belted 46 home runs with 119 RBI to go along with a .321 batting average and 101 runs. He topped that in 2003 when he hit. 335 with 53 home runs and 142 RBI, leading his team to the Korean Series championship. Shim finished second in home runs and RBI in both 2002 and 2003 to the Samsung Lions' Lee Seung-yuop, but was given a KBO League Golden Glove Award both seasons. Shim led the KBO in walks in 2003 with 124, and with 89 in 2005. He led the league in home runs and RBI in 2007, with 31 and 101 respectively, winning his third Golden Glove.

Shim's 328 career home runs rank him 6th all-time in the KBO.

== See also ==
- List of KBO career home run leaders
- List of KBO career RBI leaders
