= Jeon Jun-ho =

South Korean baseball player

- Coach, Outfielder
- Born: February 15, 1969 (age 57); Masan, Changwon, South Gyeongsang
- Batted: Left Threw: Left

KBO debut
- April 5, 1991, for the Lotte Giants

Last appearance
- September 26, 2009, for the Heroes

KBO statistics
- Batting average: .291
- Hits: 2,018
- Home runs: 42
- RBI: 577
- Stolen bases: 550
- Runs: 1,171
- Stats at Baseball Reference

Teams
- As player: Lotte Giants (1991–1996); Hyundai Unicorns (1997–2007); Heroes (2008–2009); As coach: SK Wyverns (2010); NC Dinos (2012–2021); Lotte Giants (2022–2023)

Career highlights and awards
- KBO all-time stolen base leader

- Jeon Jun-ho
- Hangul: 전준호
- Hanja: 田埈昊
- RR: Jeon Junho
- MR: Chŏn Chunho

Jeon Jun-ho (Korean: 전준호; born February 15, 1969) is a retired South Korean professional baseball outfielder who played for the Lotte Giants, the Hyundai Unicorns, and the Heroes in the Korea Baseball Organization.

Jeon is the all-time stolen base leader in the KBO League, with 550 career steals. He led the league in triples five times, in 1995 and 1996, and from 2002 to 2004. He is also one of the few hitters to surpass 2,000 career hits in the KBO League, with 2,018.

== See also ==
- List of KBO career stolen bases leaders
- List of KBO career hits leaders
