= Jeong Seong-hoon =

South Korean baseball player

Jeong Seong-hoon 정성훈 鄭成勳
- First baseman/Third baseman
- Born: June 27, 1980 (age 45); Gwangju
- Batted: Right Threw: Right

KBO debut
- April 5, 1999, for the Haitai Tigers

Last appearance
- October 16, 2018, for the Kia Tigers

KBO statistics
- Batting average: .293
- Home runs: 174
- RBI: 997
- Hits: 2,159
- Stats at Baseball Reference

Teams
- Haitai/Kia Tigers (1999–2002); Hyundai Unicorns (2003–2007); Nexen Heroes (2008); LG Twins (2009–2017); Kia Tigers (2018)

Jeong Seong-hoon (born June 27, 1980) is a South Korean former professional baseball player. He represented the South Korea national baseball team at the 2006 World Baseball Classic.

After nine seasons with the LG Twins, Jeong was released by the team at the end of the 2017 season. He played one more season, for his original franchise, the Kia Tigers, in 2018, before retiring.

His 2,159 career hits makes him one of only 11 players to amass more than 2,000 hits in their KBO League careers.

== Filmography ==
=== Television show ===
Year	Title	Role	Notes	Ref.
2022	Strongest Baseball	Cast Member		

== See also ==
- List of KBO career hits leaders
