= Yang Joon-hyuk =

South Korean baseball player

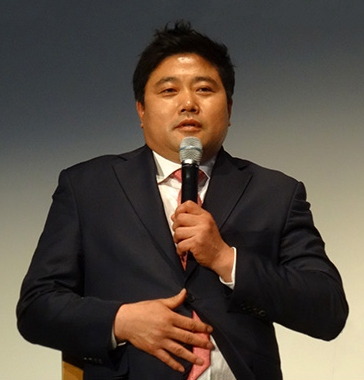
- Outfielder, First baseman, Designated hitter
- Born: Daegu, South Korea
- Batted: Left Threw: Left

KBO debut
- April 10, 1993, for the Samsung Lions

Last KBO appearance
- September 19, 2010, for the Samsung Lions

KBO statistics
- Batting average: .316
- Hits: 2,318
- Home runs: 351
- RBI: 1,389
- Stolen bases: 193
- Stats at Baseball Reference

Teams
- Samsung Lions (1993–1998); Haitai Tigers (1999); LG Twins (2000–2001); Samsung Lions (2002–2010)

Career highlights and awards
- 15× KBO All-Star Game (1993, 1995, 1996, 1997, 1998, 1999, 2000, 2001, 2002, 2003, 2004, 2005, 2006, 2007, 2010); 4× KBO Batting Champion (1993, 1996, 1998, 2001); KBO Rookie of the Year (1993); 8× KBO Golden Glove Award (1996, 1997, 1998, 2001, 2003, 2004, 2006, 2007); 3× Korean Series Champion (2002, 2005, 2006); Samsung Lions #10 retired; KBO Records: 1,278 career walks; 7,332 career at-bats

- Yang Joon-hyuk
- Hangul: 양준혁
- RR: Yang Junhyeok
- MR: Yang Chunhyŏk

Yang Joon-Hyuk's number 10 was retired by the Samsung Lions in 2010.

Yang Joon-hyuk (Korean: 양준혁, born July 10, 1969) is a South Korean retired professional baseball player. A left-handed hitter and outfielder, he spent most of his career with the Samsung Lions. He is known by the nickname "Yangshin" (양신; 梁神), or "God, Yang". He retired from baseball after the 2010 season.

Yang led the league in batting four times, and holds six career batting records (including at one time the home runs record with 351, now surpassed by Lee Seung-yeop). His number 10 was retired by the Lions.

== In popular culture ==
As of April 2011, he is a member of Happy Sunday's Qualifying Men, a Korean reality-variety show on the KBS2 network

In March 2022, Yang signed a contract with Janggoon Entertainment.

== Personal life ==
Yang married his girlfriend, who is 19 years younger, on March 13, 2021. On August 12, 2024, Yang announced his wife's pregnancy. Their daughter was born on December 11, 2024.

== Filmography ==
=== Television show ===
Year	Title	Role	Notes	Ref.
2022	Back to the Ground	Participant		
2022	The First Business in the World	Contestant		
2022	Filial Son's Village	Cast Member		
2023	World's First Merchant	Contestant	Season 2	

== See also ==
- List of KBO career home run leaders
- List of KBO career RBI leaders
- List of KBO career hits leaders
