= Lee Ho-seong (baseball) =

South Korean baseball player (1967–2008)

- Lee in the 2000s
- Outfielder
- Born: July 17, 1967; Suncheon, South Korea
- Died: March 10, 2008 (aged 40); Seoul, South Korea
- Batted: Right Threw: Right

KBO debut
- April 15, 1990, for the Haitai Tigers

Last KBO appearance
- April 15, 2001, for the Haitai Tigers

KBO statistics
- Batting average: .272
- Home runs: 102
- Runs batted in: 526
- Stats at Baseball Reference

Teams
- Haitai Tigers/Kia Tigers (1990–2001)

Career highlights and awards
- 2× KBO Golden Glove Award (1990, 1991)
Korean name
Hangul	이호성
Hanja	李昊星
RR	I Hoseong
MR	I Hosŏng

Lee Ho-seong (Korean: 이호성; Hanja: 李昊星; July 17, 1967 – March 10, 2008) was a South Korean baseball player and mass murderer.

== Baseball ==
During his baseball career, Lee played for Haitai Tigers. He debuted in 1990 and stayed with the Tigers for his 12-year career until retiring in 2001. He batted .272 and had 102 home runs in his KBO career. Ho-seong was team captain in 1999 and 2000 and became president of the league's players union in 2001.

== Murders and deathdeath ==
Police found Lee's body in the Han River on March 10, 2008. One day later, they found the bodies of a 46-year-old woman, Kim Yeon-suk, and her three children, buried together. A graveyard worker noted that Lee had asked to bury four bodies on February 19, about a day after the woman and her children went missing. Police suspected that Lee and the woman had been in a relationship. Lee had apparently borrowed the equivalent of $250,000. He was unable to pay the money back, and police speculated that this was the motive for the killings.

Police said their details about the case were still sketchy because there was no suicide note, but Lee was seen on security video removing four large black duffel bags from the woman's apartment late one evening. He was also put at the scene by a witness who saw him in the parking lot about the time that the woman and her daughters went missing.

A few days later, letters that Lee had sent to his older brother and the new president of the Gwangju Baseball Association were revealed by the police. The letter addressed to Lee's brother described his financial troubles and gave apologies to his mother, brother, wife and son, with a request for the family to look after his son. The second letter congratulated the President on his new appointment to the position, reminisced on his baseball career, and then implied his suicide as Lee signed off "I will go ahead to heaven."

=== Missing business colleague & associated deaths ===
In 2005, a businenamednamed "Mr. Cho" by the police disappeared after meeting Lee in a hotel in Gwangju over financial struggles. According to Lee's testimony, Cho then entered a taxi and disappeared, never to be seen again. Originally, the police attributed his disappearance as an intentional self-disappearance to hide from creditors. However, after the 2008 murders, renewed suspicion arose due to the similarities to the murdered women and the fact that Lee was the last person to see Cho alive.

The police eventually stated they did not find enough evidence linking Lee to the disappearance of Mr. Cho, though the family of Cho stated they believed Lee killed him, citing his love for his children and that the amount of money was not enough to drive someone like Cho to disappear himself.

== Legacy ==
=== Response ===
Upon his naming as the lead suspect in the case of Kim and her daughters, public responses from people who knew him ranged from disbelief to refusing to comment, with former teammate and manager Kim Seong-han stating he was "shocked" to hear of the incident, adding "As a player, he was just a down-to-earth guy... ...I didn’t expect things would come to this. But I think the failed business ventures might have changed him."

Most members and officials in Lee's team,Kia Tigersigers, expressed disbelief. The team commented on his mentoring of younger players and how much they admired him, and stated that they "did not know how something like this could have happened." The Korean Baseball Association also denied being sent an explicit suicide note.

At Lee's funeral, only a few former baseball associates attended, with Lee's family refusing to attend and an acquaintance showing up, but later turning back, stating "Whatever the reason, what Ho-seong did can never be forgiven." and adding "I don't understand how someone who was so polite and kind during his career could do such a thing." A citizen who watched the cremation remarked bitterly "Had Mr. Lee Ho-seong not committed murder, the funeral home would've been packed with people. Alas, for a former baseball star, his final chapter was truly disgraceful."
