= Hong Chang-ki =

South Korean baseball player (born 1993)

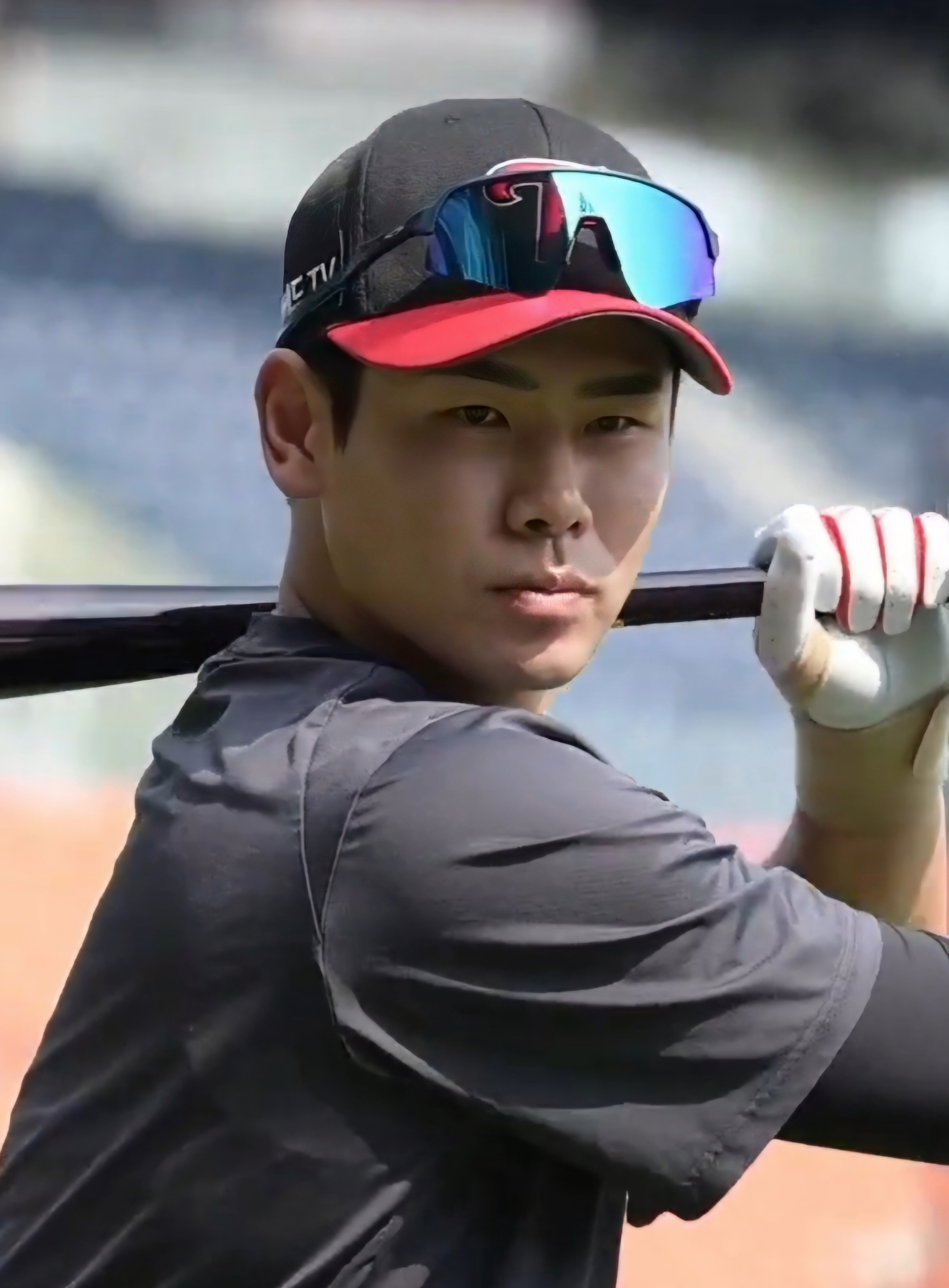

LG Twins – No. 51
- Right fielder / Left fielder / Center fielder / First baseman
- Born: 21 November 1993 (age 32); Seongnam, South Korea
- Bats: Left Throws: Right

KBO debut
- August 9, 2016, for the LG Twins

KBO statistics (through 2025 season)
- Batting average: .311
- Home runs: 17
- Runs batted in: 296
- Stats at Baseball Reference

Teams
- LG Twins (2016–present); Geelong-Korea (2019–2020)
Medals
Men's baseball
Representing South Korea
FISU World University Games
Bronze medal – third place	2015 Gwangju	Team
U-23 Baseball World Cup
Bronze medal – third place	2016 Mexico	Team

Hong Chang-ki (Korean: 홍창기; born 21 November 1993) is a South Korean professional baseball player for the LG Twins of the KBO League.
