= List of KBO career hits leaders =

The following is the current leaderboard for career hits in KBO League Korean baseball.

== Players with 2,000 or more hits ==
**Bold**	denotes active player. (Note: A player is considered inactive if he has announced his retirement or not played for a full season.)

- Stats updated at the end of the 2026 season.

Rank	Player	Hits
1	**Choi Hyung-woo**	2,734 (↑148)
2	**Kim Hyun-soo**	2,691 (↑159)
3	**Son Ah-seop**	2,655 (↑37)
4	Park Yong-taik	2,504
5	**Choi Jeong**	2,430 (↑78)
6	Yang Joon-hyuk	2,318
7	**Kang Min-ho**	2,303 (↑81)
8	Hwang Jae-gyun	2,266
9	Kim Tae-kyun	2,209
10	Lee Dae-ho	2,199
11	Park Han-yi	2,174
12	Jeong Seong-hoon	2,159
13	Lee Seung-yuop	2,156
14	Lee Yong-kyu	2,140
15	Lee Jin-young	2,125
16	**Jeon Jun-woo**	2,109 (↑53)
17	Jang Sung-ho	2,100
18	**Yang Eui-ji**	2,080
19	Hong Sung-heon	2,046
20	Lee Byung-kyu	2,042

== See also ==
- List of KBO career strikeout leaders
- List of KBO career win leaders
- List of KBO career home run leaders
- List of KBO career RBI leaders
- List of KBO career saves leaders
- List of KBO career stolen bases leaders
