= Kim Dong-soo (baseball) =

South Korean baseball player and manager

Seoul High school – No. 80
- Catcher / Coach
- Born: 27 October 1968 (age 57); Seoul
- Batted: Right Threw: Right

KBO debut
- April 8, 1990, for the LG Twins

Last appearance
- 2009, for the Nexen Heroes

KBO statistics
- Batting average: .263
- Hits: 1,556
- Home runs: 202
- RBI: 871
- Stats at Baseball Reference

Teams
- As player: LG Twins (1990–1999); Samsung Lions (2000–2001); SK Wyverns (2002); Hyundai Unicorns (2003–2007); Nexen Heroes (2008–2009); As coach: Nexen Heroes (2010–2014); LG Twins (2015–2017)

Career highlights and awards
- KBO Rookie of the Year (1990)

- Kim Dong-soo
- Hangul: 김동수
- Hanja: 金東洙
- RR: Gim Dongsu
- MR: Kim Tongsu

Kim Dong-soo (born 27 October 1968) is a former professional baseball catcher and current manager of the futures (general 2nd) LG Twins of the KBO League.

== See also ==
- List of KBO career home run leaders
