= Kim Sol =

South Korean writer (born 1973)

Kim Ho-seong (Korean: 김호성; born 1973), also known by his pen name Kim Sol (김솔), is a South Korean writer. He made his literary debut in 2012 when his short story “Naegiui Mokjeok” (내기의 목적 The Goal of a Bet) won the Korea Times New Writer’s Contest. He is the author of the short story collection Amseutereudam garaji seil du beonjjae (암스테르담 가라지 세일 두 번째 Amsterdam Garage Sale Round Two) and the flash fiction collection Mangsang, eo (망상, 어 Language of Delusion). He is the winner of the 3rd Moonji Literary Award, 22nd Kim Jun-seong Literary Award, and 7th Munhakdongne Young Writers' Award.

== Life ==
Kim Sol was born in Gwangju, South Korea in 1973. He received no formal training in writing. He studied mechanical engineering at Korea University and works at the human resources department of a large South Korean company in heavy industries. His work experience is reflected in his debut short story “Naegiui Mokjeok” (내기의 목적 The Goal of a Bet), which features office betting pools and a conflict between a Korean subordinate and foreign boss due to cultural differences. Kim began writing because of his love for Kafka. He won a writing contest when he was in university.

== Writing ==
Kim’s works have been described as “stories that predict the future of fiction in an age when readers of fiction have disappeared.” His lack of formal training in writing has allowed him to deviate from narrative conventions. He rarely specifies narrative details like time, place, and the nationality or gender of characters, focusing instead on the act of storytelling itself.

Kim’s second work Mangsang, eo (망상, 어 Language of Delusion) is a thin volume consisting of 36 flash fiction stories. They are “unbelievable stories around the world” that he collected from newspapers or TV news, his workplace, and years of living abroad. Kim tells these strange, sad anecdotes with brevity, sharp wit, and dreamlike language.

== Works ==
1. 망상, 어(語) (2017)

Language of Delusion (2017)

2. 암스테르담 가라지세일 두번째 (2014)

Amsterdam Garage Sale Round Two (2014)

== Awards ==
1. 2017: Munhakdongne Young Writers' Award

2. 2015: Kim Jun-seong Literary Award

3. 2013: Moonji Literary Award
