= Song Ji-man =

South Korean baseball player

- Outfielder
- Born: March 2, 1973 (age 53)
- Batted: Right Threw: Right

KBO debut
- April 13, 1996, for the Hanwha Eagles

Last KBO appearance
- 2013, for the Nexen Heroes

KBO statistics
- Batting average: .282
- Hits: 1,870
- Home runs: 311
- RBI: 1,030
- Stats at Baseball Reference

Teams
- Hanwha Eagles (1996–2003); Hyundai Unicorns (2004–2007); Woori Heroes · Heroes · Nexen Heroes (2008–2013)

Career highlights and awards
- 2× KBO League Golden Glove Award winner (2000, 2002); 2× Korean Series champion (1999, 2004); 2000 KBO All-Star Game MVP

Song Ji-man
Medal record

Men's baseball

World Baseball Classic
Bronze medal – third place	2006 San Diego	Team

- Song Ji-man
- Hangul: 송지만
- Hanja: 宋志晩
- RR: Song Jiman
- MR: Song Chiman

Song Ji-man (Korean: 송지만; Hanja: 宋志晩; born March 2, 1973, in Incheon, South Korea) is a South Korean former outfielder in the Korea Baseball Organization professional baseball league. He bats and throws right-handed.

== Professional career ==
=== Hanwha Eagles ===
Upon graduation from Inha University in Incheon, Song made himself eligible for the 1996 KBO Draft and was selected in the second round by the Hanwha Eagles.

In 1999, Song joined his first 20-20 club and became a member of the Korean Series championship team. In 2000, he joined his second 20-20 club, batting a career-high .338 and having his first 30+ home run season (32), and won his first KBO League Golden Glove Award after the season.

In 2002, Song posted career-highs in home runs (38) and RBI (104), and won his second Golden Glove Award. However, Song was hampered by arm injuries during the whole 2003 season, batting only .253 and hitting a career-low 9 home runs.

=== Hyundai Unicorns ===
After the 2003 season, Song was traded to the Hyundai Unicorns. In 2004, he smacked 22 home runs and drove in 74 runs, and led his team to their last Korean Series championship. In 2005, Song had another solid season with the Unicorns, batting a respectable .271 and amassing 24 home runs and 74 RBI. After the 2005 season, he was selected as a member of the South Korea national baseball team. He competed in the inaugural World Baseball Classic in March 2006.

=== Nexen Heroes ===
In the early 2000s (decade) Hyundai Group ran into financial problems, and eventually abandoned the Unicorns in 2007. The team was sold and became the Heroes. During a series of "fire sales" for the Unicorns' best players and franchises in the 2007 offseason, the Heroes kept attempting to trade Song for another big deal. However, prior to the 2008 season, Song announced that he would stay with the Heroes, accepting the 60% salary cut offered by the team. In 2008, Song batted .280, accumulating 13 home runs and 62 RBI. On April 20, 2008, he hit his 250th home run, which at that point was good for ninth-place in KBO history. In 2009, Song had an offensively productive season again, batting .289 and posting 22 home runs and 67 RBI. On May 19, 2009, he made the 1700th hit of his career, which at that point was the fifth-highest total in KBO history.

=== Notable international careers ===
Year	Venue	Competition	Team	Individual note
2002	Cuba	Intercontinental Cup	Silver medal	.214 BA (6-for-28), 8 RBI
2006	United States	World Baseball Classic	Bronze medal	.400 BA (2-for-5)

== See also ==
- List of KBO career home run leaders
- List of KBO career RBI leaders
