= Son Ah-seop =

South Korean baseball player (born 1988)

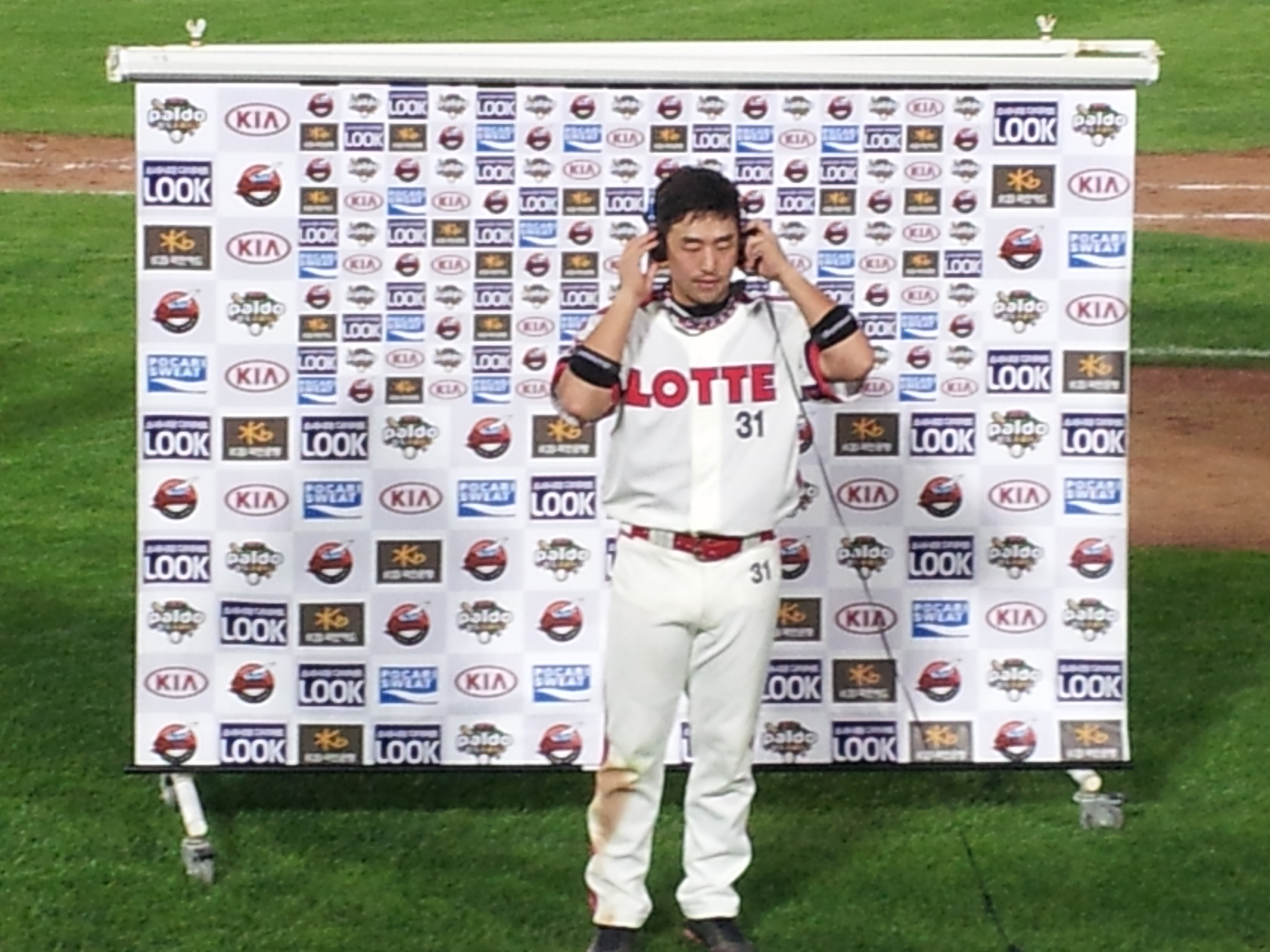

NC Dinos – No. 8
- Outfielder
- Born: March 18, 1988 (age 38); Busan, South Korea
- Bats: Left Throws: Right

KBO debut
- April 7, 2007, for the Lotte Giants

KBO statistics (through July 15, 2026)
- Batting average: .321
- Home runs: 181
- Runs batted in: 1,036
- Stats at Baseball Reference

Teams
- Lotte Giants (2007–2021); NC Dinos (2022–2025); Hanwha Eagles (2025–2026); Doosan Bears (2026); NC Dinos (2027–present)

Career highlights and awards
- 6× KBO Golden Glove Award (2011–2014, 2017, 2023); 4× KBO hits leader (2012, 2013, 2017, 2023); KBO batting champion (2023)
Medals
Men's baseball
Representing South Korea
2015 WBSC Premier12
Gold medal – first place	2015 Tokyo	Team

- Son Ah-seop
- Hangul: 손아섭
- Hanja: 孫兒葉
- RR: Son Aseop
- MR: Son Asŏp

Former name
- Hangul: 손광민
- Hanja: 孫光民
- RR: Son Gwangmin
- MR: Son Kwangmin

Son Ah-seop (born March 18, 1988, in Busan, South Korea) is a South Korean professional baseball player for the NC Dinos of the KBO League.

== Career ==
Son Ah-seop is an outfielder. He is one of the most consistent hitters in the KBO, having hit above .300 ten years in a row (from 2010 to 2018), and winning the KBO League Golden Glove Award four consecutive times. His .322 lifetime batting average ranks in the top ten all-time for the KBO.

Son attended Busan High School. He led the KBO League in hits in 2012 and 2013.

== International career ==
He represented the South Korea national baseball team at the 2013 World Baseball Classic, 2014 Asian Games, 2015 Premier12, 2017 World Baseball Classic and 2018 Asian Games.

== Television appearances ==
- 2021, King of Mask Singer (MBC): Contestant as "DDaeng" (episode 291)
