= List of KBO career home run leaders =

The following is the current leaderboard for career home runs in KBO League Korean baseball.

== Players with 250 or more home runs ==
**Bold**	denotes active player. (Note: A player is considered inactive if he has announced his retirement or not played for a full season.)

- Stats updated at the end of the 2026 season.

Rank	Player	Home runs
1	**Choi Jeong**	538 (↑20)
2	Lee Seung-yeop	467
3	**Choi Hyoung-woo**	437 (↑36)
4	Park Byung-ho	418
5	Lee Dae-ho	374
6	**Kang Min-ho**	363 (↑13)
7	Yang Joon-hyuk	351
8	Chang Jong-hoon	340
9	Lee Ho-joon	337
10	Lee Bum-ho	329
11	Shim Jeong-soo	328
12	Park Kyung-oan	314
13	**Na Sung-bum**	313 (↑31)
14	Kim Tae-kyun	311
	Song Ji-man	311
15	**Yang Eui-ji**	305 (↑23)
16	**Kim Jae-hwan**	300 (↑24)
	Park Jae-hong	300
19	**Kim Hyun-soo**	275 (↑14)
20	Kim Dong-joo	273
21	Park Seok-min	269
22	Ma Hae-yeong	260
23	Lee Man-soo	252

== See also ==
- List of KBO career strikeout leaders
- List of KBO career win leaders
- List of KBO career saves leaders
- List of KBO career RBI leaders
- List of KBO career stolen bases leaders
- List of KBO career hits leaders
