= Kim Jae-hwan (baseball) =

South Korean baseball player (born 1988)

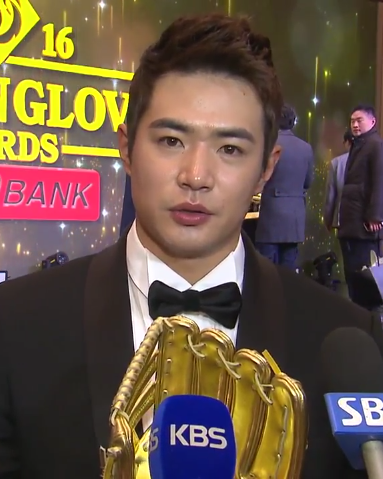

SSG Landers – No. 32
- Left fielder / Designated hitter
- Born: September 22, 1988 (age 38)
- Bats: Left Throws: Right

KBO debut
- April 18, 2008, for the Doosan Bears

KBO statistics (through 2024 season)
- Batting average: .284
- Home runs: 263
- Runs batted in: 932
- Stats at Baseball Reference

Teams
- Doosan Bears (2008, 2011–2012, 2014–2025); SSG Landers (2026–present)

Career highlights and awards
- 2× Korean Series champion (2016, 2019); KBO MVP (2018); 2× KBO Golden Glove Award (2016, 2018); KBO home run leader (2018); KBO RBI leader (2018)

- Kim Jae-hwan
- Hangul: 김재환
- Hanja: 金宰煥
- RR: Gim Jaehwan
- MR: Kim Chaehwan

Kim Jae-hwan (Korean: 김재환; born September 22, 1988) is a South Korean outfielder and designated hitter for the SSG Landers of the KBO League. He bats left-handed and throws right-handed.

== Professional career ==
After graduation from Incheon High School, he was selected by the Doosan Bears as a catcher in the second round of the 2008 KBO Draft.

In 2008, Kim appeared in just 14 games as a pinch hitter and had 3 hits in 21 at-bats.

After the 2008 season, Kim temporarily left the Bears to serve a two-year military service. During that period, he continued to play baseball in the Korea Armed Forces Athletic Corps Baseball Team.

In 2011, Kim was discharged from the military duty and joined the Doosan Bears again. However, he continued to serve as a backup designated hitter, appearing in only 30 games.

He hit his stride in 2016, hitting .325 with 37 home runs and 124 RBI. He repeated his success in 2017, hitting .340 with 35 homers and 115 RBI. In 2018 he won the KBO League Most Valuable Player Award, hitting .334 with 44 home runs and 133, leading the league in both the latter categories.

== International career ==
In November 2010, Kim was selected for the South Korea national baseball team to compete in the 2010 Intercontinental Cup held in Taichung. In the tourney, Kim won the home run title and was named to the All-Star team, smacking 3 home runs and batting .448.

After the 2011 season, he was selected for the South Korean national team again to compete in the 2011 Baseball World Cup.

In 2018, he represented South Korea at the 2018 Asian Games.

Year	Venue	Competition	Team	Individual note
2010	Chinese Taipei	Intercontinental Cup	6th	.448 (13-for-29), 8 RBI, 3 HR, 8 R All-Star (DH)
2011	Panama	Baseball World Cup	6th	.333 (7-for-21), 4 RBI, 3 R, 8 BB

== Doping incident ==
Kim tested positive for testosterone doping after the 2011 Baseball World Cup. He was suspended for 10 games, and apologized to his fans, saying "I will make atonement with my ability."
