= 2008 Korean Series =

The 2008 Korean Series began on Monday, 26 October, at the Munhak Baseball Stadium in Incheon. It featured the SK Wyverns, who had claimed home ground advantage by finishing in first place at the end of the season, and the Doosan Bears, who had finished second and had defeated the Samsung Lions in a best-of-7 playoff series (4 games to 2) to advance to the next round. The SK Wyverns won the series in five games, after defeating Doosan four games straight after dropping the opening game. It pitted the final 2 teams from the 2007 Korean Series in a rematch.

== Game 1, October 26 ==
Munhak Baseball Stadium, Incheon

The first game of the series began at the home stadium of the Wyverns. However, they failed to get the victory on the opening game 2 years straight as Doosan got a decisive 5–2 victory, thanks to the excellent pitching of Matt Randal. Young prodigy Kim Kwang-hyun started for the Wyverns could not shut down Doosan's hitting.

SK struck first, as 2007's MVP Kim Jae-hyun shot a solo home run over the right field fence. Doosan answered back in the 5th, when Chae Sang-byung got onto 1st base with a line drive towards 3rd base. Jeon Sang-ryeol bunt-sacrificed, then Chae advanced to 3rd on a passed ball. Lee Jong-wook hit him home with a single. Doosan went ahead in the 6th, as Kim Dong-joo hit a double, advanced on a sacrifice, then Ko Young-min got a base on balls. Doosan used power hitter Choi Jun-seok as a pinch hitter, and it paid off, as he hammered the ball, allowing Ko to score from first. Doosan added to their lead in the 7th, as Lee Jong-wook scored with help from Oh Jae-won and Ko Young-min. Hong Sung-heon shot a solo home run in the 9th, but it wasn't necessary. SK tried to fight back, but managed to only score one more run in the bottom of the 7th. A combination of Randal's pitching, as well as reliever Lee Jae-woo shut down the Wyverns.

Team	1	2	3	4	5	6	7	8	9	R	H	E
Doosan Bears	0	0	0	0	1	2	1	0	1	5	9	1
SK Wyverns	0	1	0	0	0	0	1	0	0	2	6	1
WP: Matt Randal (1–0) LP: Kim Kwang-hyun (0–1) Sv: Lee Jae-woo (1); Home runs: DOO: Hong Sung-heon (1); SK: Kim Jae-hyun (1)

== Game 2, October 27 ==
Munhak Baseball Stadium, Incheon

SK evened the series with the aid of some strong batting and some poor defensive work by Doosan. The game was an almost total turn-around of game 1, with an identical score of 5–2. Just like last year, SK started Chae Byeong-yong, while Doosan started former major-leaguer Sunny Kim.

The game began well for SK as leadoff hitter Jeong Keun-woo got onto base and advanced with a narrow hit by Park Jae-hong. Lee Jin-young hit Jeong home, and Park scored after the pitcher threw a wild pitch. Doosan responded in the fourth with a double from Kim Dong-joo, then a triple from Hong Sung-heon. Ko Young-min hit a sacrifice fly to bring in the 2nd run. The game winner was in the 5th by Park Jae-sang, and in the 7th, Kim Jae-hyun hit another home run (2 runs), for his second in the series and 2nd in 2 days.

Team	1	2	3	4	5	6	7	8	9	R	H	E
Doosan Bears	0	0	0	4	0	0	0	0	0	2	4	4
SK Wyverns	2	0	0	0	1	0	2	0	0	5	9	0
WP: Jeong Woo-ram (1–0) LP: Sunny Kim (0–1) Sv: Chong Tae-hyon (1); Home runs: DOO: None; SK: Kim Jae-hyun (1)

== Game 3, October 29 ==
Jamsil Baseball Stadium, Seoul

Doosan returned home to their stadium in Jamsil with the series tied at 1–1 series. Doosan started left-handed Lee Hei-chun, and SK answered by starting Lee Jae-won in the place of the designated hitter, as he had a higher hitting average against left-handed pitchers. SK started Kenny Rayburn.

The game started off as a pitcher's duel, with both pitchers striking out several batters. Both teams struck in the 4th inning, putting 1 run on the board each. SK went ahead 3–1 in the 6th, as young 3rd baseman Choi Jeong hit a 2-run home run on the first pitch of reliever Lee Jae-woo. Doosan answered back with a solo home run from relief catcher Choi Seung-hwan in the 7th, but SK held onto their 1-run lead to close the game up and take a 2–1 lead in the series.

Doosan very nearly came back in the 9th inning, as closer Chong Tae-hyon loaded the bases with 1 out, but Hyun-soo Kim hit into a double-play, allowing SK to take the win and giving Chong the save.

Team	1	2	3	4	5	6	7	8	9	R	H	E
SK Wyverns	0	0	0	1	0	2	0	0	0	3	5	0
Doosan Bears	0	0	0	1	0	0	1	0	0	2	11	1
WP: Jeong Woo-ram (2–0) LP: Lee Hei-chun (0–1) Sv: Chong Tae-hyon (2); Home runs: SK: Choi Jeong (1); DOO: Choi Seung-hwan (1)

== Game 4, October 30 ==
Jamsil Baseball Stadium, Seoul

Game 4 saw the return of Matt Randal for Doosan, while SK started sometimes-reliable Song Eun-bum in classic Kim Sung-keun strategy of fast and frequent pitcher changing. SK used 7 pitchers in total, while Doosan used only 3.

Sk struck in the 1st inning with a hit from Park Jae-sang, stole to 2nd, and made it to 3rd after an error from Chae Sang-byung. Kim Jae-hyun sacrificed to bring him home. Doosan struck back with the dangerous combination of Kim Dong-joo and Hong Sung-heon. Oh Jae-won hit into a double-play, but Kim scored from 3rd base.

Game 4 continued a Doosan trend in the series of Doosan creating many scoring opportunities but failing to capitalize on them. Jeon Sang-ryeol managed to hit a lead-off double in the 3rd, but made a critical error. Lee Jong-wook hit a ball just behind the 2nd base that surely looked to be a hit, but some amazing defense from Jeong Keun-woo managed to catch the ball, and merely had to throw the ball to 2nd to tag out Jeon, who ran and never looked back. Also, Doosan managed to load the bases with 0 outs in the 7th, but once again failed to score as reliever Lee Seung-ho struck out 2 Doosan hitters, walked the next one, but the 4th one grounded out.

SK decided to use Chae Byeong-yong as a closer in game 5, and he managed to hold on to the victory, giving him a rare save. He loaded the bases in the 8th, but struck out pinch-hitter Yoo Jae-woong. Doosan managed to get 1 runner to 2nd base in the 9th, but could not get any closer to scoring. SK went up 3–1, only one win away from claiming their 2nd consecutive Korean Series victory.

Team	1	2	3	4	5	6	7	8	9	R	H	E
SK Wyverns	1	0	0	1	0	0	1	0	1	4	10	1
Doosan Bears	0	1	0	0	0	0	0	0	0	1	7	2
WP: Ka Deuk-yeom (1–0) LP: Matt Randal (1–1) Sv: Chae Byeong-yong (1)

== Game 5, October 31 ==
Jamsil Baseball Stadium, Seoul

Game 5 was yet another pitcher's duel, this time between Kim Kwang-hyun and Kim Sun-woo, both vying for a win in this year's series. It was do or die for Doosan, and neither team allowed any runs until the 7th inning.

Doosan had scoring opportunities almost every inning, but failed. However, SK rarely was able to get runners on base, shut down by the superb pitching of Kim Sun-woo. A reversal of fortunes came about in the 7th inning, as Sk was able to load the bases. Catcher Park Kyung-oan, who has hitless in the series, hammered a linedrive towards 3rd, hurting Kim Dong-joo's hand, and causing him to drop the ball. Sk would add one more to the scoreboard in the 8th, as Park Jae-sang hit a single, and came home with a hit from Choi Jeong.

SK starter Kim Kwang-hyun allowed 0 runs in 6 1/3 innings, and was followed by 4 relievers in an attempt to shut down the hungry and now desperate Doosan hitters.

Doosan once again got multiple runners on base in the 8th, but failed to score as Sk outfielder Cho Dong-hwa made an amazing catch against Hong Sung-heon. Once again reliever Lee Seung-ho saved the team, striking out Yoo Jae-woong. This performance earned Lee the MVP nomination, but he did not win.

The 9th inning was the most pivotal moment of the game, as Doosan had the game but failed completely to capitalize on the situation. Once again, SK put Chae Byeong-yong on the mound as a closer. Doosan managed to load the bases with 0 outs. It looked like a Doosan comeback was inevitable. Amazingly, Chae put away Ko Young-min and Hyun-soo Kim hit into a double-play, handing SK their 2nd consecutive Korean Series victory.

Twenty-one-year-old third baseman Choi Jeong was named the series MVP.

Team	1	2	3	4	5	6	7	8	9	R	H	E
SK Wyverns	0	0	0	0	0	0	1	1	0	2	5	0
Doosan Bears	0	0	0	0	0	0	0	0	0	0	8	1
WP: Kim Kwang-hyun (1–1) LP: Kim Sun-woo (0–2) Sv: Chae Byeong-yong (2)
