= 2007 Korean Series =

Baseball series

The 2007 Korean Series began on Monday, 22 October, at the Munhak Baseball Stadium in Incheon. It featured the SK Wyverns, who had claimed home ground advantage by finishing in first place at the end of the season, and the Doosan Bears, who had finished second and had swept the Hanhwa Eagles in a best-of-5 playoff series to advance to the next round. The SK Wyverns won the series in six games, after becoming the first team in Korean Series history to claim victory after losing the first two games. The series was also notable for the inability of teams to win at their home grounds (just one home victory out of the six games) and for some unsavory and aggressive incidents between the two teams that marred the first three games.

== Game 1, 22 October ==
Munhak Baseball Stadium, Incheon

The first game of the series began at the home stadium of the Wyverns, but they failed to take advantage as Doosan completed a 2–0 shutout victory, thanks to the pitching of their ace Daniel Rios. Kenny Rayburn started for the Wyverns but was unable to emulate Rios's feat of giving up only 4 hits and 1 walk. The game also saw two instances of Doosan batters being struck by pitches, which would become an issue in the next game.

Doosan scored their first run in the first inning. Lee Jong-wook was the lead-off runner, and Ko Young-min drove him in with a double. They added to their score in the fifth, when Lee walked in again off a Kim Dong-joo sacrifice fly with the bases loaded. Rayburn lasted six innings, with five more pitchers coming out of the bullpen over the next three innings to try to keep the score at 2–0. Rios, with a superb performance, pitched the full nine innings, throwing 99 pitches to get the win.

Team	1	2	3	4	5	6	7	8	9	R	H	E
Doosan Bears	1	0	0	0	1	0	0	0	0	2	6	0
SK Wyverns	0	0	0	0	0	0	0	0	0	0	4	1
WP: Daniel Rios (1–0) LP: Kenny Rayburn (0–1)

== Game 2, 23 October ==
Munhak Baseball Stadium, Incheon

Doosan took a 2–0 lead in the series with the aid of some strong batting and some sloppy Wyverns defensive work. An incident occurred before the game started, with Doosan officials suspecting that the Wyverns had hidden a camera beneath the first base fence to steal signs, which was later proven false as the 'camera' turned out to be a sewer. Tensions spilled onto the field as three more Doosan batters were struck by pitches, making a total of five over the two games. Benches cleared in the sixth inning when Doosan batter Kim Dong-joo was struck by a pitch from starter Chae Byeong-yong, delaying the game for six minutes. The incident proved to be a turning point, as Doosan scored three more runs in the inning to achieve the final scoreline of 6–3.

The game began well for SK as first-baseman Lee Ho-jun hit a two-run home run in the first to put the score at 2–0. Doosan responded in the third with a two-run shot of their own from second-baseman Ko Young-min. They took the lead in the fifth with another home run when catcher Chae Sang-byung scored with two out to give Doosan a slender advantage. SK fought back almost immediately with the fourth and final home run of the game off the bat of left-fielder Cho Dong-hwa. In the top of the sixth, Ko Young-min reached first with a lead-off single, and advanced to second after Kim Dong-joo was struck by the bench-clearing pitch. A single from former Wyverns shortstop Lee Dae-su got both of them home and Chae Sang-byung added a sixth when his double scored Lee. Doosan's starter Matt Randel came away with the win.

Team	1	2	3	4	5	6	7	8	9	R	H	E
Doosan Bears	0	0	2	0	1	3	0	0	0	6	10	0
SK Wyverns	2	0	0	0	1	0	0	0	0	3	7	0
WP: Matt Randel (1–0) LP: Chae Byeong-yong (0–1) Sv: Im Tae-hoon (1); Home runs: DOO: Ko Young-min (1), Chae Sang-byung (1); SK: Lee Ho-jun (1), Cho Dong-hwa (1)

== Game 3, 25 October ==
Jamsil Baseball Stadium, Seoul

Doosan returned home to their stadium in Jamsil with a 2–0 series lead. This was significant as no team in Korean Series history had won after losing the first two games. Based on the form of the teams in the first two games, it looked as though a sweep was inevitable. In this game, however, there was a remarkable reversal of fortunes as SK struck back significantly to win 9–1. Doosan, who had been confident and aggressive in the first two games, suddenly looked hesitant and ineffective.

The Wyverns put slugger Kim Jae-hyun back into the batting order as their DH, and it immediately paid dividends. Wyverns shortstop Jeong Keun-woo got on with a lead-off single, and Kim scored him with a double to right field. Park Jae-hong got Kim home with a single to put the Wyverns up 2–0, the way they had begun in the last game. The pitching duel continued between Wyverns starter Michael Romano and Doosan's Kim Myeong-jae as neither of them allowed any more runs up until the top of the sixth. There, Doosan suddenly imploded, as shortstop Lee Dae-su, who had been hailed for his efforts in the previous two games, made a string of bad errors including dropped catches and mis-judged base throws to allow multiple SK batters to score or get on base. An attempted home steal by Jeong Keun-woo was also successful as keeper Chae Sang-byung mishandled a pitch by reliever Lee Hei-chun, also allowing Cho Dong-hwa to score from second.

Doosan pulled a run back when Ko Young-min scored Lee Jong-wook with a single in the bottom of the sixth, but they would not manage to post another run after that, and SK ran out winners with the scoreline substantially in their favor.

Team	1	2	3	4	5	6	7	8	9	R	H	E
SK Wyverns	2	0	0	0	0	7	0	0	0	9	16	1
Doosan Bears	0	0	0	0	0	1	0	0	0	1	6	4
WP: Michael Romano (1–0) LP: Kim Myeong-jae (0–1)

== Game 4, 26 October ==
Jamsil Baseball Stadium, Seoul

Game 4 saw the return of Daniel Rios for Doosan, and it was widely assumed that his return would restore stability to the team. Meanwhile, SK announced the shock appointment of rookie pitcher Kim Kwang-hyun in place of expected pitcher Kenny Rayburn who had competed admirably with Rios in the first game. It appeared that SK were going to throw the game, take a 3–1 series deficit against a seemingly un-hittable Rios and fight back with a fresher pitching rotation.

But Kim managed to stage what must be one of the most remarkable performances in the history of the Korean Series, giving up only one hit in 7 1/3 innings. On the other hand, Rios only lasted for five innings, giving up nine hits and three earned runs. Doosan's bullpen reclaimed a hold on the game, but they were unable to score any runs and suffered their first shutout loss of the series.

SK continued their habit of scoring early as Kim Jae-hyun again opened the scoring with a double to bring in Jeong Keun-woo in the first. Doosan's bats struggled, only managing to get on base with two walks and a hit over five innings. SK were getting runners most innings, but were unable to take advantage until the fifth, when back-to-back home runs from Cho Dong-hwa and Kim Jae-hyun put them up 3–0. Wyverns third baseman Choi Jeong made it four when his single brought in Jeong Kyeong-bae who had walked to first and advanced on a bunt from Park Kyung-oan.

Doosan were unable to fare any better against the Wyverns relievers Cho Woong-cheon and Ka Deuk-yeom, and their hit in the sixth inning remained their only hit for the night.

Team	1	2	3	4	5	6	7	8	9	R	H	E
SK Wyverns	1	0	0	0	2	1	0	0	0	4	13	0
Doosan Bears	0	0	0	0	0	0	0	0	0	0	1	0
WP: Kim Kwang-hyun (1–0) LP: Daniel Rios (1–1); Home runs: SK: Cho Dong-hwa (2), Kim Jae-hyun (1); DOO: None

== Game 5, 27 October ==
Jamsil Baseball Stadium, Seoul

Game 5 was played on a beautiful Saturday afternoon at the Jamsil stadium. Kenny Rayburn returned for the Wyverns; he faced Matt Randall. This game turned out to be the most competitive since the first game. Rayburn and Randall each pitched 6 innings giving up no runs; Rayburn had only 3 hits to Randall's 5 but he did give up 6 walks compared to Randall's 2. The game was to be decided by the bullpens, with Cho Woong-cheon coming on for the Wyverns and Im Tae-hoon for the Bears. Both got through the seventh unscathed, but an error in the top of the eight by second-baseman Ko Young-min with a misjudged throw to first base allowed leadoff batter Cho Dong-hwa to get onto second. Kim Jae-hyun continued his excellent post-season form with a massive triple to open the scoring for SK. He was brought in by another Lee Ho-jun double to make the score 2–0. Speedy Kim Kang-min made it three with yet another double, and after managing to advance to third, walked in for an easy fourth run after a wild pitch from new reliever Lee Hei-chun rounded out the scoring for the game. SK was now positioned to win the series up three games to two, and with the next two games to be played at their home ground in Incheon. They had completely swung the momentum in their favour, and Doosan had scored only once during the whole three games they had played at home.

Team	1	2	3	4	5	6	7	8	9	R	H	E
SK Wyverns	0	0	0	0	0	0	0	4	0	4	10	0
Doosan Bears	0	0	0	0	0	0	0	0	0	0	5	1
WP: Cho Woong-cheon (1–0) LP: Im Tae-hoon (0–1)

== Game 6, 29 October ==
Munhak Baseball Stadium, Incheon

Game 6 was to prove the final game of the series as SK became the first team of the 2007 Korean Series to win a home game. SK went with Chae Byeong-yong, the losing pitcher of game 2, to start, while Doosan went with rookie reliever Im Tae-hoon in a somewhat surprising role as starting pitcher. Doosan needed a major form reversal to win the game and force a series decider.

They showed their intentions early, managing a run after Hyun-soo Kim was brought home from second by a Kim Dong-joo double. They held the lead until the third innings, when the Wyverns young third-baseman Choi Jeong, who had had a quiet series, managed to get to first, and then a two-run home run by shortstop Jeong Keun-woo put them in front 2–1. Kim Jae-hyun turned his great post-season form into spectacular post-season form by adding another with a solo shot in the same innings. The scoreline remained 3-1 when Chae Byeong-yong was taken off after 5 1/2 innings of service to bring in their main post-season reliever Cho Woong-cheon, as Doosan tried to claw back the lead. But they struggled for hits, with only a Hong Sung-heon double between innings six to eight to show for their efforts, and things got worse for them in the bottom of the eighth as SK added two more runs. Na Ju-hwan got on base and advanced to second with a Part Kyung-oan grounder, and Choi Jeong's single was enough to bring him home. The next batter, Jeong Keun-woo, walked, and a Cho Dong-hwa double brought home Choi and gave a four-run lead to SK, now up 5–1.

Closer Chong Tae-hyon, who had been brought on in the previous inning, was given the task of closing out the game for the championship win. Doosan rallied though, Hong Sung-heon leading-off to first and then scoring on a hit from pinch-hitter Yoo Jae-woong. Another pinch-hitter, Jeon Sang-ryeol, scored a double which only got Yoo as far as third, and that brought Lee Jong-wook to the plate. A home run would have tied up the game and sent it into extra innings, but Chong struck him out to bring the Wyverns their first Korean Series victory in the history of the franchise. Designated hitter Kim Jae-hyun was named the series MVP.

Team	1	2	3	4	5	6	7	8	9	R	H	E
Doosan Bears	1	0	0	0	0	0	0	0	1	2	8	0
SK Wyverns	0	0	3	0	0	0	0	2	0	5	10	1
WP: Chae Byeong-yong (1–1) LP: Im Tae-hoon (0–2) Sv: Chong Tae-hyon (1); Home runs: DOO: None; SK: Jeong Keun-woo (1), Kim Jae-hyun (2)
