= List of Nippon Professional Baseball players (R) =

The following is a list of Nippon Professional Baseball players with the last name starting with R, retired or active.

== R ==
- Brian Raabe
- Brady Raggio
- Alex Ramirez
- Enrique Ramirez
- Felix Ramirez
- Ramón Ramírez
- Roberto Ramírez
- Santiago Ramírez
- Alex Ramirez
- Matthew Randel
- Gary Rath
- Kenny Rayborn
- Randy Ready
- Kevin Reimer
- Chris Resop
- Michael Restovich
- Tuffy Rhodes
- Keiichi Ri
- Jerrod Riggan
- Adam Riggs
- Daniel Rios
- Ben Rivera
- Dave Roberts
- Boi Rodriguez
- Nerio Rodríguez
- Mike Romano
- Carlos Rosa
- Robert Rose
- Ryan Rupe
