= Chae =

- Hangul: 채
- Hanja: 蔡; 菜; 采
- RR: Chae
- MR: Ch'ae

Chae (Korean: 채), also less commonly spelled Chai, Chea, or Chei is a Korean family name. Its meaning differs based on the hanja used to write it.

== Overview ==
The 2000 South Korean Census found 119,251 people with the family name Chae. It could be written with any of three hanja, indicating different lineages. In a study by the National Institute of the Korean Language based on year 2007 application data for South Korean passports, it was found that 87.8% of people with this surname spelled it in Latin letters as Chae in their passports. Another 7.5% spelled it as Chai, 2.8% as Che, and 1.7% as Chea.

=== Most common (蔡) ===
蔡 (성씨 채 songssi chae) is by far the most common of the three Chae surnames. This character is also used to write the Chinese family name pronounced Cài ([t͡sʰai̯˥˩]) in Mandarin. The 2000 Census found 114,069 people and 35,099 households with this surname, divided among seventeen reported bon-gwan (clan hometowns, not necessarily the actual residence of clan members), as well as eighty-six people whose bon-gwan was not stated:

- Pyonggang, Kangwon (today in North Korea): 69,256 people and 21,373 households They claim descent from Chae Song-nyeon (채송년; 蔡松年), an official under Gojong of Goryeo.
- Incheon, Gyeonggi (today in South Korea): 37,391 people and 11,415 households They claim descent from Chae Seon-mu (채선무; 蔡先茂), who lived sometime during mid-Goryeo Dynasty.
- Other or unreported bon-gwan: 7,422 people and 2,311 households

=== Second-most common (菜) ===
菜 (나물 채 namul chae) is the second-most common of the three Chae surnames. The 2000 Census found 3,516 people and 1,067 households with this surname, divided among two reported bon-gwan:

- Yeongyang, North Gyeongsang (today in South Korea): 1,816 people and 576 households
- Jinju, South Gyeongsang: 1,627 people and 483 households
- Other or unreported bon-gwan: 73 people and eight households

=== Least common (采) ===
采 (풍채 채 pungchae chae, 캘 채 kael chae) is the least common of the three Chae surnames. The 2000 Census found 1,666 people and 566 households with this surname, with one reported bon-gwan:

- Yeosan: 1,637 people and 562 households
- Other or unreported bon-gwan: 29 people and two households

=== People ===
People with these family names include:

- John Minkyu Chae (born 1981), Korean American oral and maxillofacial surgeon
- Chae Bo-hun (born 1992), South Korean singer-songwriter
- Chae Byong-duk (1916–1950), South Korean army general
- Chei Byung-yong (born 1982), South Korean baseball player
- Chan-Byoung Chae (born 1976), South Korean computer scientist, electrical engineer, academic
- Esther K. Chae (born 1971), Korean American actress
- Chae Eui-jin (born 1973), South Korean voice actress
- Chae Eun-hee (born 1982), South Korean marathon runner
- Chae Eun-seong (born 1990), South Korean baseball player
- Chae Gwang-jin (also known as Piglet, born 1994), South Korean League of Legends coach
- Chae Gwang-seok (born 1962), South Korean gymnast
- Chae Ho-ki (born 1957), South Korean poet
- Chae Hong-nak (born 1961), South Korean long-distance runner
- Chae Hyeon-il (born 1970), South Korean politician
- Chae Hyun-woo (born 2004), South Korean footballer
- Chae Hyung-won (born 1994), South Korean singer, member of boy band Monsta X
- Ch'ae Chegong (1720–1799), Joseon scholar, writer, politician
- Chae Ji-hoon (born 1974), South Korean short track speed skater
- Ji Young Chae (born 1993), South Korean ballet dancer
- Chae Jong-hyeop (born 1993), South Korean actor
- Junseok Chae (?–2020), South Korean engineer and academic administrator
- Chae Keun-bae (born 1970), South Korean sport shooter
- Chae Kyung-yee (born 1980), South Korean former tennis player
- Chae Man-sik (1902–1950), Korean novelist
- Chae Myung-shin (1926–2013), South Korean army general
- Nelson Chai (born 1965), American investment banker
- Chae Sang-byung (born 1979), South Korean baseball coach and former player
- Chae Sang-woo (born 1999), South Korean actor
- Chae Seon-ah (born 1992), South Korean volleyball player
- Chae Shi-ra (born 1968), South Korean actress
- Chae Song-hak (born 1955), North Korean politician
- Chea Song-joo (born 1998), South Korean figure skater
- Chae Song-oh (born 1989), South Korean fencer
- Chae Su-chan (born 1955), South Korean academic and politician
- Chae Sung-bae (born 1968), South Korean heavyweight boxer
- Chae Won-bin (born 2001), South Korean actress
- Chae Yoo-jung (born 1995), South Korean badminton player

==== Stage name ====
- Chae Jung-an (born Jang Jung-an, 1977), South Korean actress and singer
- Chae Min-seo (born Jo Soo-jin, 1981), South Korean actress
- Chae Ri-na (born Park Hyun-joo, 1978), South Korean singer
- Chae Seo-jin (born Kim Ko-woon, 1994), South Korean actress
- Chae Soo-bin (born Bae Soo-bin, 1994), South Korean actress

== See also ==
- List of Korean family names
