= Seung-ho =

- Hangul: 승호
- RR: Seungho
- MR: Sŭngho

Seung-ho is a Korean given name.

People with this name include:

- Kim Seung-ho (1917–1968), South Korean film actor
- Choi Seungho (born 1954), South Korean poet
- Lee Seung-ho (born 1976), South Korean baseball relief pitcher
- An Seung-ho (born 1978), stage name Tony An, South Korean singer, member of boy band H.O.T.
- Lee Seung-ho (born 1981), South Korean baseball relief pitcher
- Yang Seung-ho (born 1987), South Korean singer, member of boy band MBLAQ
- Choi Seung-ho (footballer) (born 1992), South Korean football midfielder (K-League Challenge)
- Yoo Seung-ho (born 1993), South Korean actor
- Paik Seung-ho (born 1997), South Korean football midfielder for Birmingham City

== See also ==
- List of Korean given names
- Sungho County
