= Chei =

Chei may refer to:

== People ==
- Chei or Chae, Korean surname
- Chei Byung-yong (born 1982), South Korean baseball player

== Places ==
- Bicaz-Chei, Romania

== Other ==
- Cholinesterase inhibitor
