= Hur Do-hwan =

South Korean baseball player

Hur Do-Hwan
- Catcher
- Born: July 31, 1984 (age 41); Seoul, South Korea
- Batted: Right Threw: Right

KBO debut
- 2007, for the Doosan Bears

Last KBO appearance
- September 28, 2024, for the LG Twins

KBO statistics
- Batting average: .209
- Home runs: 13
- Runs batted in: 142
- Stats at Baseball Reference

Teams
- Doosan Bears (2007); Nexen Heroes (2011–2014); Hanwha Eagles (2015–2017); SK Wyverns (2018–2019); KT Wiz (2020–2021); LG Twins (2022–2024)

Hur Do-hwan (Korean: 허도환; born July 31, 1984) is a South Korean former professional baseball catcher. He played in the KBO League for the Doosan Bears, Nexen Heroes, Hanwha Eagles, SK Wyverns, KT Wiz, and LG Twins. He bats and throws right-handed.

== Amateur career ==
After graduating from Seoul High School, Hur was drafted by the Doosan Bears in the second round (63rd overall) of the 2003 KBO League draft. Hur did not sign with them; instead he opted for college, attending Dankook University. Hur was a four-year starting catcher for Dankook University from 2003 to 2006. As a senior in 2006, Hur was selected for the South Korea national baseball team and competed in the friendly baseball series against the United States national baseball team. In the series, Hur played in two games as a starting catcher. In Game 1, Huh went 2-for-3 with an RBI and 2 runs. In that game, he hit a double in the third inning and a solo home run in the fifth inning off 2006 Collegiate Baseball Player of the Year winner and future Diamondbacks' prospect Wes Roemer.

=== Notable international careers ===
Year	Venue	Competition	Team	Individual note
2006	United States	South Korea vs USA Baseball Series	1W-2L	.400 (2-for-5), 1 RBI, 2 R

== Professional career ==
Signed by the Doosan Bears in 2007 after graduation from Dankook University, Hur began his rookie season in the Bears' second team. He was promoted to the 26-man first team roster in the middle of the season but was relegated to the second team again due to the ligament injury to his elbow, playing in only one game as a substitute catcher.

Hur was waived by the team after the 2007 season, and served his two years of military duty as a public service agent.

In 2011 when he was discharged from military duty, Hur signed a one-year contract as a free agent with the Nexen Heroes. He started his 2011 season playing for the Heroes' second team in the Futures League. On June 1, Hur was called up to the Heroes' first team after a waist injury landed the starting catcher Kang Kwi-Tae on the disabled list. On June 2, he hit an RBI double off reliever Bryan Corey against the Lotte Giants. On June 10, Hur played in his first starting lineup as a catcher. On June 16, Hur went 2-for-4 with 2 RBI against the Bears, and he subsequently earned a regular spot behind the plate for the Heroes.
