= Rayborn =

Rayborn is a surname. Notable people with the surname include:

- Cal Rayborn (1940-1973), American motorcycle racer
- John Rayborn (born 1975), American football player
- Kenny Rayborn (born 1974), American baseball player

== See also ==
- Rayborn, Missouri, a community in the United States
