= Lee Jae-woo =

Lee Jae-woo may refer to:

- Lee Jae-woo (actor) (born 1991), South Korean actor
- Lee Jae-woo (baseball) (born 1980), South Korean relief pitcher
- Lee Jae-woo (handballer) (born 1979), Korean handball player
- Lee Jae-woo (badminton) (born 1992), South Korean badminton player
- Lee Jae-woo (born 1988) is Lee Yi-kyung's real name.
