= Lee Seung-ho =

Lee Seung-ho is the name of:

- Lee Seung-ho (baseball, born 1976), South Korean baseball player
- Lee Seung-ho (baseball, born 1981), South Korean baseball player
- Lee Seong-ho, represented South Korea at the 2007 World Cup (men's golf)
- Lee Seung-ho (actor), South Korean actor and model
