= 2008 Korea Professional Baseball season =

Samsung PAVV Pro Baseball 2008 2008 삼성 PAVV 프로야구
- League: Korea Professional Baseball
- Sport: Baseball
- Duration: March 29–October
- Games: 126 per team
- Teams: 8

Regular Season
- Season champions: SK Wyverns
- Runners-up: Doosan Bears
- Season MVP: Kim Kwang-hyun (SK)

League Postseason
- Semiplayoff champions: Samsung Lions
- Semiplayoff runners-up: Lotte Giants
- Playoff champions: Doosan Bears
- Playoff runners-up: Samsung Lions

Korean Series
- Champions: SK Wyverns
- Runners-up: Doosan Bears
- Finals MVP: Choi Jeong (SK)

KBO seasons
- ← 2007 2009 →

The 2008 Korea Professional Baseball season, officially known as the Samsung PAVV Pro Baseball 2008 (Korean: 2008 삼성 PAVV 프로야구) for sponsorship reasons, was the 27th season in the history of the KBO League, this was the first season with the Heroes, that had replaced the now-folded Hyundai Unicorns.

The champions of the season were the SSG Langers known as SK Wyverns at that time.

== Season structure ==
=== Season format ===
- Regular Season: 126 games for each team
- Semiplayoff: regular-season 3rd place vs. regular-season 4th place – best of 5
- Playoff: regular-season 2nd place vs. Semiplayoff winner – best of 7
- Korean Series: regular-season 1st place vs. Playoff winner – best of 7

=== Final standings ===
- Champion (1st place): Korean Series winner
- Runner-up (2nd place): Korean Series loser
- 3rd–8th place: sort by regular-season record except teams to play in the Korean Series

=== Sponsorship change ===
Hyundai stopped their sponsorship after the 2007 season, and the Unicorns were renamed the Woori Heroes after Centennial Investments sold the naming rights to the Woori Tobacco Company. They also announced possible player salary reductions.

== Standings ==
Rank	Team	W	L	Pct.	GB
1	SK Wyverns	83	43	.659	–
2	Doosan Bears	70	56	.556	13.0
3	Lotte Giants	69	57	.548	14.0
4	Samsung Lions	65	61	.516	18.0
5	Hanwha Eagles	64	62	.508	19.0
6	Kia Tigers	57	69	.452	26.0
7	Heroes	50	76	.397	33.0
8	LG Twins	46	80	.365	37.0

== Postseason ==
=== Semiplayoff ===
Samsung Lions win the series, 3–0

Game	Score	Date	Location	Attendance
1	Samsung Lions – 12, Lotte Giants - 3	October 8	Sajik Baseball Stadium	30,000
2	Samsung Lions – 4, Lotte Giants - 3	October 9	Sajik Baseball Stadium	27,559
3	Lotte Giants – 4, Samsung Lions - 6	October 11	Daegu Baseball Stadium	12,000

=== Playoff ===
Doosan Bears win the series, 4–2

Game	Score	Date	Location	Attendance
1	Samsung Lions – 4, Doosan Bears – 8	October 16	Jamsil Baseball Stadium	30,500
2	Samsung Lions – 7, Doosan Bears – 4 (14 innings)	October 17	Jamsil Baseball Stadium	30,500
3	Doosan Bears – 2, Samsung Lions – 6	October 19	Daegu Baseball Stadium	12,000
4	Doosan Bears – 12, Samsung Lions – 6	October 20	Daegu Baseball Stadium	12,000
5	Doosan Bears – 6, Samsung Lions – 4	October 21	Daegu Baseball Stadium	12,000
6	Samsung Lions – 2, Doosan Bears – 5	October 23	Jamsil Baseball Stadium	30,500

=== Korean Series ===
SK Wyverns win the series, 4–1

Game	Score	Date	Location	Attendance
1	Doosan Bears – 5, SK Wyverns – 2	October 26	Munhak Baseball Stadium	30,400
2	Doosan Bears – 2, SK Wyverns – 5	October 27	Munhak Baseball Stadium	30,400
3	SK Wyverns – 3, Doosan Bears – 2	October 29	Jamsil Baseball Stadium	30,500
4	SK Wyverns – 4, Doosan Bears – 1	October 30	Jamsil Baseball Stadium	30,500
5	SK Wyverns – 2, Doosan Bears – 0	October 31	Jamsil Baseball Stadium	30,500

== Foreign hitters ==
Team	Player	Position	In KBO since	Batting Average	Home runs	RBI	Notes
Doosan Bears	NONE	N/A					
Hanwha Eagles	Doug Clark	OF	2008	.246	22	79	
Kia Tigers	Wilson Valdez	SS	2008	.281	1	16	
LG Twins	Roberto Petagine	1B	2008	.347	7	35	Replaced starting pitcher Jamie Brown on the roster
Lotte Giants	Karim García	OF	2008	.283	30	111	Golden Glove Award
Samsung Lions	Jacob Cruz	OF	2007	.282	2	21	
SK Wyverns	NONE	N/A					Team had 3 foreign pitchers
Woori Heroes	Cliff Brumbaugh	OF	2003	.293	13	61	

== Statistics ==
=== Team statistics ===
Team	Team BA	Team ERA	Runs Scored	Runs Allowed	HR
SK Wyverns	.282	3.22	632	461	89
Lotte Giants	.282	3.64	624	518	93
Doosan Bears	.276	3.89	647	542	68
Heroes	.266	4.43	499	609	70
Kia Tigers	.260	4.08	503	555	48
Samsung Lions	.258	4.40	557	596	92
LG Twins	.256	4.85	468	646	66
Hanwha Eagles	.254	4.43	592	595	120
Totals			4,522	4,522	646
