= Greg LaRocca =

American baseball player (born 1972)

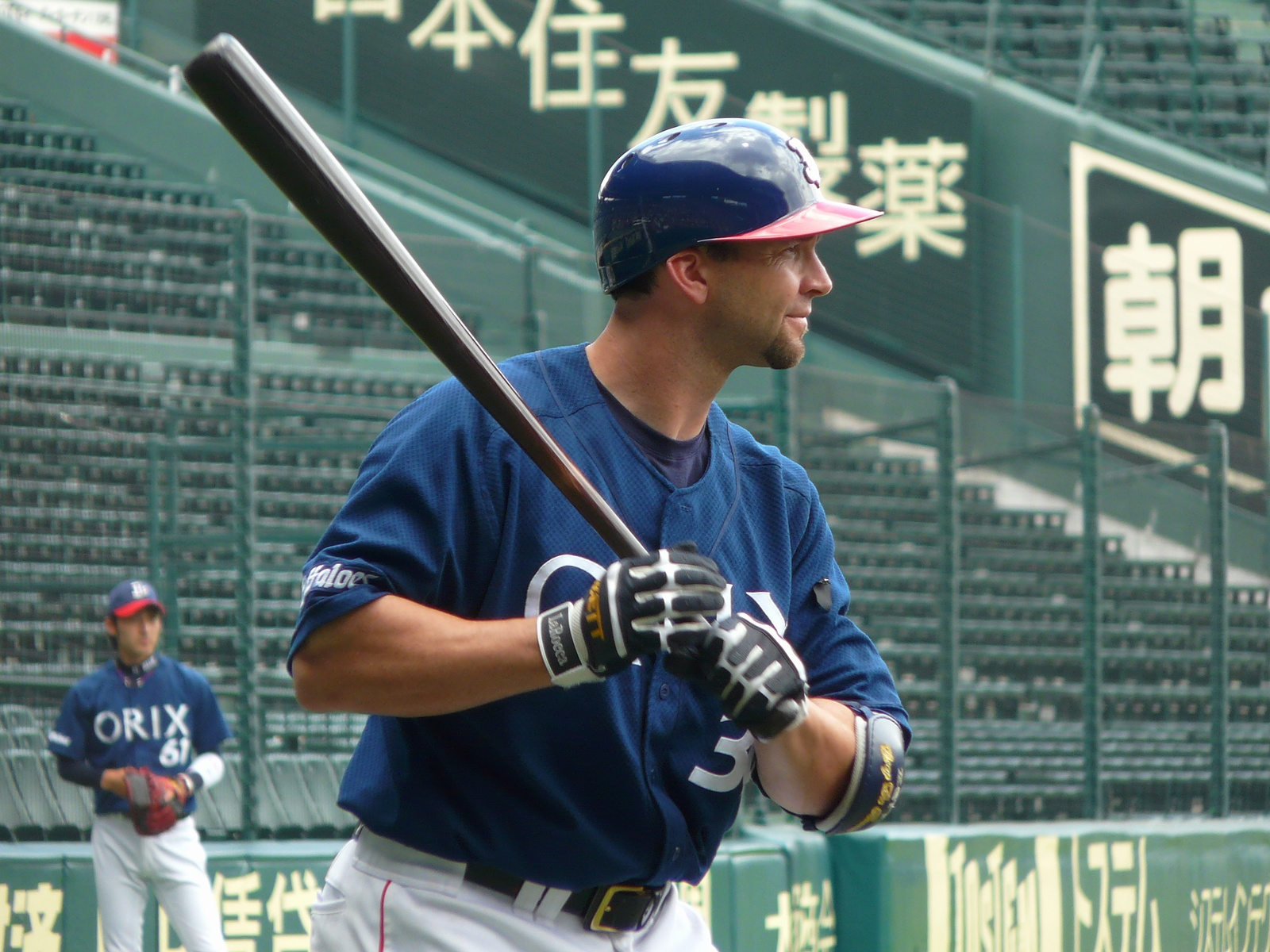
- A picture of Greg LaRocca
- Infielder
- Born: November 10, 1972 (age 54); Oswego, New York, U.S.
- Batted: Right Threw: Right

Professional debut
- MLB: September 7, 2000, for the San Diego Padres
- NPB: April 2, 2004, for the Hiroshima Toyo Carp

Last appearance
- MLB: September 7, 2000, for the San Diego Padres
- NPB: May 2, 2010, for the Orix Buffaloes

MLB statistics
- Batting average: .261
- Home runs: 0
- Runs batted in: 6

NPB statistics
- Batting average: .293
- Home runs: 104
- Runs batted in: 372
- Stats at Baseball Reference

Teams
- San Diego Padres (2000); Cleveland Indians (2002–2003); Hiroshima Toyo Carp (2004–2005); Tokyo Yakult Swallows (2006); Orix Buffaloes (2007–2010)

Gregory Mark LaRocca (born November 10, 1972) is an American former Major League Baseball (MLB) second baseman who played for the San Diego Padres and Cleveland Indians between 2000 and 2003. He also played in the Nippon Professional Baseball league from 2004 to 2010.

== Biography ==
LaRocca attended Manchester High School West in Manchester, New Hampshire and the Isenberg School of Management at University of Massachusetts Amherst. In 1993, he played collegiate summer baseball with the Orleans Cardinals of the Cape Cod Baseball League. He was drafted by the San Diego Padres in the 10th round (262nd overall) of the 1994 MLB draft.

== Major League Baseball ==
=== Minor Leagues (1994–1999) ===
LaRocca played for Low-A Spokane Indians and High-A Rancho Cucamonga Quakes. The 1995 season was split between High-A Rancho Cucamonga Quakes and AA Memphis Chicks. The entire 1996 season was played for AA Memphis Chicks. LaRocca played all of 1997 for AA Mobile BayBears. The 1998 season was played for AAA Las Vegas Stars. LaRocca stayed in AAA Las Vegas for all of 1999 as well.

=== San Diego Padres (2000) ===
LaRocca started the 2000 season in AAA Las Vegas. He was a September call-up when MLB rosters expand beyond the traditional 25-man roster. LaRocca made his MLB debut on September 7, 2000. He played 13 games with a total of 27 at-bats. He accumulated 4 singles, 2 doubles, and 1 walk. His batting line for the 2000 season ended with a .222 average, .293 slugging, and .546 On Base + Slugging (OPS). LaRocca played three different infield positions in the 2000 season. 8 games at third base, 4 at shortstop, and 2 at second base with a 0.939 fielding percentage. He was released by the Padres on March 28, 2001.

=== Cleveland Indians (2001–2003) ===
On May 7, 2001, LaRocca signed with the Cleveland Indians. LaRocca did not play in the Majors during the 2001 season. He split the year between the AA Akron Aeros and AAA Buffalo Bisons. During the 2002 season, LaRocca split time between AAA Buffalo and the Indians. In Cleveland, he played over 21 games collecting 14 hits over 52 at bats, collecting a triple and 4 doubles. His batting line for the 2002 season ended with a .269 average, .365 slugging, and .732 OPS. La Rocca played third base, second base, and designated hitter (DH). LaRocca started and ended his 2003 season with the Bisons. He spent the last part of September with Cleveland playing in 5 games at third base and DH. He amassed 3 hits over 9 at-bats, including one double.

== Nippon Professional Baseball ==
=== Hiroshima Carp (2004–2005) ===
In 2004 he joined the Hiroshima Toyo Carp. The contract was not expensive, and the signing did not attract much attention before the opening of the season. TlIn bringing in LaRocca, the Carp obtained a middle of the order bat with the ability to hit the ball to all fields. When the season began, LaRocca maintained a high batting average, to go along with 26 homers in the first half. In the second half LaRocca continued to perform, finishing with a batting average of .328, to go with 40 home runs and 101 RBI. LaRocca's .328 average was second in the league. However, he recorded 66 strikeouts for the season.

In 2005, LaRocca batted cleanup, but an injury to his hand caused his season to be shortened to only 80 games. However, he managed to hit .303, along with 18 home runs and 56 RBI. On November 18, 2005, LaRocca, along with Tom Davey and Kenny Rayborn, were designated for assignment, then traded to the Yakult Swallows.

=== Yakult Swallows (2006) ===
In 2006, Yakult formed a strong central axis with teammates Alex Ramirez, Adam Riggs and LaRocca. The nickname "F-Brothers" was attached to the three foreign fielders by fans. Although the 2006 season was a success, LaRocca was sidelined in August with a knee injury that required surgery. That season, he played 103 games, batted .285, and hit 18 home runs. On December 1, LaRocca became a free agent. He then joined the Orix Buffaloes.

=== Orix Buffaloes (2007–2010) ===
For the 2007 season, LaRocca was appointed the starting third baseman and number 3 hitter in the order. Through the first few weeks of May, he hit .300 with 17 home runs. LaRocca broke the 55-year old NPB record of hit-by-pitches in a single season with 28. In 2008, LaRocca complained of right elbow pain, and did not play after May 5. On May 28, the team announced that LaRocca had undergone reconstructive surgery of his right Ulnar Collateral Ligament, also known as Tommy John surgery. This surgery caused his season to come to an end, and the Buffaloes considered releasing LaRocca.

In 2009, LaRocca renegotiated his contract and took a substantial salary reduction, agreeing to a contract on January 28. The Buffaloes acquired Jose Fernandez to play third base, so LaRocca moved over to first. On opening day against the Lotte, three consecutive home runs were recorded for the first time in three years by himself and two other teammates. With Alex Cabrera and Tuffy Rhodes injured, LaRocca filled the hole of Fernández, who was also injured. LaRocca was bumped to batting 4th, and hit 12 home runs. However, in the game against Softbank on July 28, he was hit by a pitch for the 100th time in his career, thirteenth most in NPB history. On that HBP, thrown by Masahiko Morifuku, LaRocca broke his right hand, knocking him out for the remainder of the season. With LaRocca being repeatedly sidelined, the team once again considered releasing him. However, his contract was affordable, so LaRocca returned for the 2010 season.

In 2010, LaRocca was mostly the DH, playing one game at first base. In a game against Rakuten on March 22, LaRocca hit a two-run home run off of Rei Nagai. However, in a game against Rakuten on April 10, he was again hit by a pitch, fracturing his pinky finger. In an effort to preserve his season, LaRocca covered the affected part of the little finger with a metal plate, attached to a shock absorbing pad from the top of the batting glove. To much success, he hit 4 home runs while the digit was fractured. However, as Aarom Baldiris began to rise, LaRocca mainly played as DH and pinch hitter. He later injured his back, and was put on the disabled list on May 25. After the season, LaRocca retired from professional baseball.

== Retirement ==
LaRocca was a scout for the Orix Buffaloes from 2011–2016. He scouted players from the United States to play for the NPB. LaRocca was the manager for the Granite State Games, a high school showcase in New Hampshire. LaRocca is a hitting and fielding instructor in New Hampshire for both private and team consulting.

== Style of play ==
LaRocca was a middle of the order hitter who pulled the ball to left field. When he signed with Orix, he formed "big boys batting line" with Tuffy Rhodes and Alex Cabrera (including Jose Fernandez in 2009 season). When reporters asked the reasons for the strong showing at Orix, LaRocca replied, "Tuffy hits behind me, I can swing the bat carefully and I can swing the bat hard", placing trust in Rhodes.

LaRocca played second, third, and first base during his career. He had good command of all positions, earning a .945 career fielding percentage at all levels. He excited fans in Japan with many diving stops and throws on the run.

LaRocca was often injured in Japan, in part due to being hit by pitches.

== Hit by pitch ==
LaRocca was known in Japan as a player who was often hit by pitches. In 2007, he was hit 28 times, which is a NPB record. In seven seasons up to 2010, he recorded 109 HBP. During that time, his number of at-bats per HBP was about 21.8 (2375 AB / 109 HBP), more than twice as much as the previous record.

In 2007 he had a remarkable 20 HBP just in the first half of the season. Before the All-Star Game, LaRocca said "I thought that there would be no [hit by pitches] in the All-Star game", but he was struck by Koharu Uehara in his first bat. LaRocca was uninjured, and Uehara spread both hands to appeal for health. On September 17, LaRocca had his 25th HBP of the season, thrown Shibuya Naoyuki of the Lotte Marines, and passing the Japanese record set by Yoshiyuki Iwamoto. LaRocca then waved hands towards the crowd and took a bow. In the same year's salary negotiation, it turned out that LaRocca was hoping for an "unprecedented" incentive at the number of HBP. Among the increase in annual salary, "treatment expenses" of injuries caused by HBP were included.

== Personal life ==
September 28, 2007, the Orix team announced that it would donate 100 million yen to the Research Promotion Foundation for Spina Bifida and Hydrocephalus. LaRocca revealed how he offered the donation. "I want to repay for Japan", he said.

Greg is married to his wife, Amanda. They have two children together. They reside in New Hampshire.

LaRocca has played in the Wounded Warriors Project softball game in 2016 and 2017 as a member of the celebrity team. The game is played as a fundraiser to aid veterans injured in combat.

== Statistics ==
=== Batting Performance by Year ===
Year	Team	Games	Plate Appearances	At-Bats	Runs	Hits	Double	Triple	HomeRuns	Total Bases	RBI	Stolen Bases	Caught Stealing	Sacrifice Hits	Sacrifice Fly	Walks	Intentional Walk	Hit By Pitch	Strikeouts	Ground Into Double Play	Batting average	On Base %	Slugging %	OPS
2000	SD	13	30	27	1	6	2	0	0	8	2	0	0	2	0	1	0	0	4	1	.222	.250	.296	.546
2002	CLE	21	60	52	12	14	3	1	0	19	4	1	0	0	0	6	0	2	6	1	.269	.367	.365	.732
2003	CLE	5	10	9	3	3	1	0	0	4	0	0	0	0	0	1	0	0	1	0	.333	.400	.444	.844
2004	Hiroshima	122	513	436	89	143	28	2	40	295	101	11	7	0	2	52	3	23	66	12	.328	.425	.677	1.102
2005	Hiroshima	80	296	267	40	81	12	1	18	149	56	0	0	0	1	18	0	10	30	8	.303	.368	.558	.926
2006	Yakult	103	436	379	58	108	14	0	18	176	63	2	1	0	3	34	3	20	52	6	.285	.372	.464	.836
2007	Orix	136	576	503	79	144	29	0	27	254	79	2	1	0	6	39	4	28	74	11	.286	.366	.505	.871
2008	Orix	26	105	89	12	15	4	0	1	22	9	0	0	0	1	8	0	7	14	3	.169	.286	.247	.533
2009	Orix	74	291	261	28	75	16	0	12	127	43	0	0	0	1	17	0	12	36	4	.287	.357	.487	.844
2010	Orix	42	158	133	16	34	8	0	7	63	21	0	1	0	1	15	0	9	18	3	.256	.367	.474	.841
MLB : 3 years		39	100	88	16	23	6	1	0	31	6	1	0	2	0	8	0	2	11	2	.261	.337	.352	.689
NPB : 7 years		583	2375	2068	322	600	111	3	123	1086	372	15	10	0	15	183	10	109	290	47	.290	.376	.525	.901

*The bold in each year is the highest in league, the Italics is the highest in NPB

== Records and awards ==
=== Awards ===
- All Star : 2 times (2004: second baseman, 2007: third baseman)

=== Records ===
==== NPB Firsts ====
- First appearance: April 2, 2004, vs. Chunichi Dragons
- First hit: April 2, 2004 vs. Chunichi Dragons
- First Steal Base: April 9, 2004, Yokohama Bay Stars
- First home run: April 9, 2004, Yokohama Bay Stars
- First Hit By Pitch: April 14, 2004, Hanshin Tigers

==== NPB Milestones ====
- 100 homers: August 28, 2007, Fukuoka Softbank Hawks
  - 251st person in history
- 100 HBP: July 28, 2009 Fukuoka SoftBank Hawks
  - 13th in history (the fastest in history)

==== NPB Records ====
- Season 28 HBP (2007, Japan professional baseball record)
- 1 inning 2 home runs: May 11, 2006, Seibu Lions (17th in history)
- All-Star game participation: 2 times (2004, 2007)

=== Jersey numbers ===
- 20 (2000)
- 62 (2002–2003)
- 43 (2004–2005)
- 29 (2006)
- 30 (2007–2010)
