= Im Tae-hoon =

South Korean baseball player

- Relief pitcher
- Born: September 28, 1988 (age 37); Seoul, South Korea
- Batted: Right Threw: Right

KBO debut
- April 8, 2007, for the Doosan Bears

Last KBO appearance
- October 16, 2014, for the Doosan Bears

KBO statistics
- Win–loss record: 39–30
- Earned run average: 4.00
- Strikeouts: 427
- Saves: 19
- Stats at Baseball Reference

Teams
- Doosan Bears (2007–2014)

Career highlights and awards
- 2007 KBO Rookie of the Year
Medals
Men's baseball
Representing South Korea
Asian Games
Gold medal – first place	2010 Guangzhou	Team
World Baseball Classic
Silver medal – second place	2009 Los Angeles	Team

- Im Tae-hoon
- Hangul: 임태훈
- Hanja: 林泰勳
- RR: Im Taehun
- MR: Im T'aehun

Im Tae-hoon (born September 28, 1988) is a South Korean relief pitcher who played for the Doosan Bears in the KBO League. He bats and throws right-handed.

== Amateur career ==
Im attended Seoul High School in Seoul, South Korea. In 2006, he was selected for the South Korea national junior team that won the gold medal at the 2006 World Junior Baseball Championship in Cuba. Im pitched 5 shutout innings, struck out 9, and allowed only 2 hits to win over Panama in the preliminary round. He started another preliminary match against Australia, and allowed 2 runs over 4.1 innings.

=== Notable international careers ===
Year	Venue	Competition	Team	Individual note
2006	Cuba	World Junior Baseball Championship	Gold medal	

== Professional career ==
Im debuted with the 2007 Doosan Bears. In his first KBO season, he pitched 101.1 innings with 7–3, a save, 20 holds (the league's runner-up), 93 strikeouts and a 2.40 ERA. Im eventually won the Rookie of the Year award.

In July 2008, Im was named as a member of the 2008 South Korea Olympic national baseball team together with the fellow 2006 World Junior Baseball champion Kim Kwang-hyun. However, Im, who gave up six earned runs in six innings in his last five KBO games, also struggled during an exhibition game against the Netherlands Olympic team in Seoul on August 3, and on the next day he was finally replaced with Yoon Suk-min of the Kia Tigers by Team Korea manager Kim Kyung-moon.

Im finished the 2008 KBO season as a setup man with a 6–3 record and a 3.41 ERA with 6 saves, 14 holds (5th in the league) and 83 strikeouts (13th in the league) in 83 innings pitched.

In March 2009, Im earned a late slot on the South Korea national baseball team for the 2009 World Baseball Classic, replacing Hwang Doo-sung three days before the start of the WBC. Im, the youngest player on the Korean roster, appeared in 2 games against Japan and Chinese Taipei, and pitched 3.1 innings, allowing one run and five hits.

=== Notable international careers ===
Year	Venue	Competition	Team	Individual note
2007	Chinese Taipei	Asian Baseball Championship	Silver medal	
2009	United States	World Baseball Classic	Silver medal	0-0; 2.70 ERA (2 G, 3.1 IP, 1 ER, 3 K)
2010	China	Guangzhou Asian Games	Gold medal	1-0; 0.00 ERA (1 G, 5.0 IP, 0 ER, 9 K)
