= Kang Kwi-tae =

South Korean baseball player

- Catcher
- Born: August 12, 1979 (age 46); Incheon, South Korea
- Bats: Right Throws: Right

KBO debut
- 2002, for the Hyundai Unicorns

KBO statistics (through 2011)
- Batting average: .256
- Home runs: 31
- Runs batted in: 214

Teams
- Hyundai Unicorns (2002–2007); Nexen Heroes (2008–2012); Kia Tigers (2013)

Career highlights and awards
- 2x Korean Series champion (2003, 2004)

- Kang Kwi-tae
- Hangul: 강귀태
- Hanja: 姜貴太
- RR: Gang Gwitae
- MR: Kang Kwit'ae

Kang Kwi-tae (Korean: 강귀태; Hanja: 姜貴泰; born August 12, 1979) is a South Korean catcher for the Kia Tigers of the KBO League. He bats and throws right-handed.

== Amateur career ==
Upon graduation from high school, Kang, one of the top catching prospects, was drafted by the Hyundai Unicorns in the 2nd round of the 1998 KBO Draft, but he subsequently opted instead to enter Dongguk University and play college baseball.

As a freshman at Dongguk University, Kang shared the playing time behind the plate but showed signs of promise as an offensive catcher, batting .333 with 3 home runs and 14 RBI. In February 1999, Kang was selected for the South Korean collegiate national baseball team and participated in the 3 Nations Invitational Baseball Tournament held in Taiwan.

As a junior at Dongguk University in 2000, Kang batted .277 with 17 RBI, becoming a full-time starter behind the plate. He became the first player of Dongguk University to hit for the cycle, doing so on April 8, 2000. In July 2000, Kang was selected for the South Korea collegiate national team and competed in the Korea–USA Baseball Championship Series.

As a senior in 2001, Kang batted .250 with 3 home runs and 13 RBI. He competed in the Asian Baseball Championship for the South Korean national team, serving a backup catcher to Chae Sang-byung.

=== Notable international careers ===
| Year | Venue | Competition | Team | Individual Note |
|---|---|---|---|---|
| 1999 | Chinese Taipei | 3 Nations Invitational Baseball Tournament | Silver medal | |
| 2000 | United States | South Korea vs USA Baseball Championship | 1W–4L | |
| 2001 | Chinese Taipei | Asian Baseball Championship | Silver medal | |

== Professional career ==
Kang made his pro league debut in 2002 for the Hyundai Unicorns. In that season, he played 74 games, serving as the back-up catcher to Park Kyung-oan and batting a respectable .272 in 147 at-bats. Prior to the 2003 season, Park Kyung-oan was traded to the SK Wyverns. However, Kang remained in the backup role as veteran catcher Kim Dong-soo signed a free-agent contract with the Unicorns.

In 2005, Kang first appeared in over 100 games as a catcher, batting .264 and posting career-highs in RBI (38) and home runs (8).
