= Kwang-hyun Kim =

South Korean baseball player (born 1988)

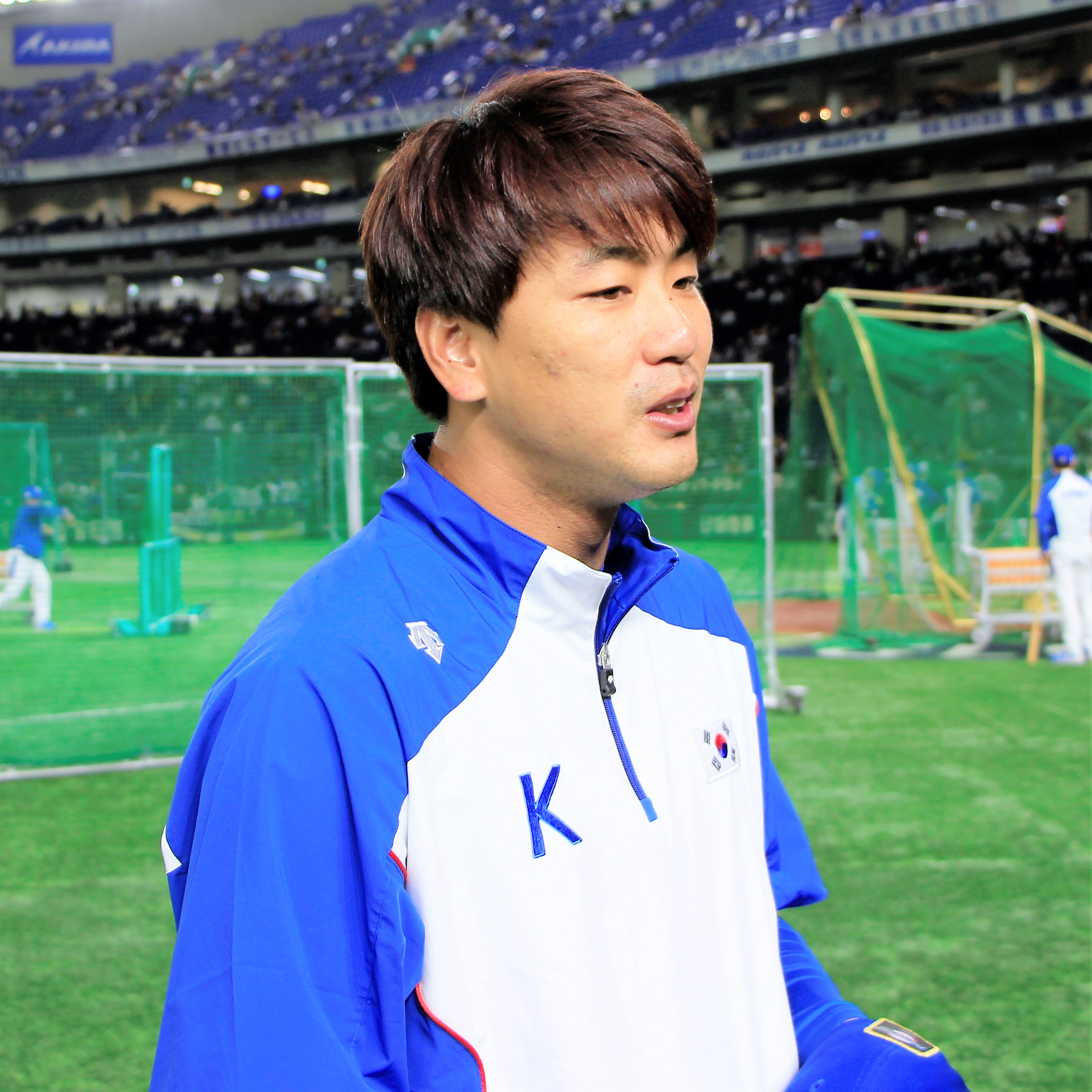
- Kim with Team South Korea at the 2019 WBSC Premier 12

SSG Landers – No. 29
- Pitcher
- Born: July 22, 1988 (age 37); Seoul, South Korea
- Bats: Left Throws: Left

Professional debut
- KBO: April 10, 2007, for the SK Wyverns
- MLB: July 25, 2020, for the St. Louis Cardinals

KBO statistics (through 2025)
- Win–loss record: 180–108
- Earned run average: 3.43
- Strikeouts: 2,020

MLB statistics (through 2021 season)
- Win–loss record: 10–7
- Earned run average: 2.97
- Strikeouts: 104
- Stats at Baseball Reference

Teams
- SK Wyverns (2007–2019); St. Louis Cardinals (2020–2021); SSG Landers (2022–present)

Career highlights and awards
- KBO: Choi Dong-won Award (2022); MVP (2008); Golden Glove Award (2008); 5× Korean Series Champion (2007, 2008, 2010, 2018, 2022)
Medals
Men's baseball
Representing South Korea
World Baseball Classic
Silver medal – second place	2009 Los Angeles	Team
WBSC Premier12
Gold medal – first place	2015 Tokyo	Team
Silver medal – second place	2019 Tokyo	Team
Olympic Games
Gold medal – first place	2008 Beijing	Team
Asian Games
Gold medal – first place	2014 Incheon	Team
World Junior Baseball Championship
Gold medal – first place	2006 Sancti Spíritus	Team

- Kwang-hyun Kim
- Hangul: 김광현
- Hanja: 金廣鉉
- RR: Gim Gwanghyeon
- MR: Kim Kwanghyŏn

Kwang-hyun Kim (Korean: 김광현; born July 22, 1988) is a South Korean professional baseball pitcher for the SSG Landers of the KBO League. He has previously played in Major League Baseball (MLB) for the St. Louis Cardinals.

== Amateur career ==
Kim attended Ansan Technical High School in Ansan, Gyeonggi Province, South Korea. In 2004, he led his team to the first national championship ever, pitching four-consecutive complete game victories in the tournament with a 0.96 ERA, and was named MVP.

== Professional career ==
=== SK Wyverns (2007–2019) ===
Signed by the SK Wyverns, Kim made his professional debut on April 10, 2007. He was in the Wyverns' starting pitching rotation for most of the 2007 KBO League season. Although his performance was inconsistent, he showed signs of promise as a rookie, including pitching a one-hit victory in 7 1/3 innings over the Doosan Bears, facing MVP Daniel Rios in the 2007 Korean Series.

In the 2008 season, Kim had a career year. He went 16–4 with a 2.39 ERA and 150 strikeouts in 162 innings pitched. Kim ended the season as the KBO League leader for both wins and strikeouts.

On August 2, 2009, Kim was hit with a batted ball hit by Hyun-soo Kim when he had one of the worst pitching performances in his KBO League career, allowing 4 runs in just 2 innings against the Doosan Bears. He suffered a fracture on the back of his hand and he was out for the season as the result. However, he won the 2009 ERA title, pitching 138.1 innings which enabled him enough to qualify for the ERA title.

On November 4, 2014, Kim was posted to MLB. The San Diego Padres won the bidding with a bid of $2 million. However, contract negotiations ended without an agreement and Kim returned to the SK Wyverns.

For the 2019 season, Kim went 17–6 with a 2.51 ERA and a 1.24 WHIP over 190.1 innings.

=== St. Louis Cardinals (2020–2021) ===
On December 17, 2019, Kim signed a two-year contract worth $11 million (combined option $3 million) with the St. Louis Cardinals. The SK Wyverns received a $1.6 million posting fee. When the start of the 2020 Major League Baseball season was delayed by the COVID-19 pandemic, Kim considered returning to Korea to be with his family. He was convinced, however, by Cardinals teammate Adam Wainwright to stay in the United States with the Cardinals.

On July 24, 2020, Kim made his MLB debut against the Pittsburgh Pirates, allowing 1 earned run over 1 inning of work. On August 22, he earned his 1st MLB win. Kim finished his first MLB season with a 3–0 record, 24 strikeouts and a 1.62 ERA.

In 2021, Kim appeared in 27 games (21 starts) and posted a 7–7 record with a 3.46 ERA, 80 strikeouts and 39 walks in 106 2/3 innings. He became a free agent following the season.

=== SSG Landers (2022–present) ===
On March 7, 2022, Kim signed a 4-year, $12.3M contract with the SSG Landers, returning to the KBO. His contract was the most valuable in the history of the league.

On June 1, 2023, South Korea baseball began an investigation of Kim and two other WBC pitchers (Lee Yong-chan and Jeong Cheol-won) for violating behavioral codes. The violation was a result of the three pitchers boozing during two nights of the tournament, and Kim was demoted to the minor leagues by SSG as a result of the investigation.

== Awards and honors ==
=== Awards ===
- 2008 KBO MVP
- 2008 Golden Glove Award (Pitcher)

=== Achievements ===
- 2008 Wins Title
- 2008 Strikeouts Title
- 2009 ERA Title
- 2009 Winning Percentage Leader
- 2010 Wins Title

== International career ==
In 2005, Kim was selected for the South Korea national junior team that was runner-up at the 6th Asian Junior Baseball Championship in Seoul, South Korea. He earned two wins against Chinese Taipei, and pitched a five-inning no-hitter against Japan.

In 2006, Kim competed for the South Korea national junior team in the 22nd World Junior Baseball Championship in Havana, Cuba. He led his team to the gold medal, earning four of South Korea's six wins. Kim tossed a five-hit complete game shutout to lead South Korea to a 1–0 victory over Chinese Taipei in the quarterfinals, and pitched two wins over Canada in the semifinals and USA in the final. He posted a solid 0.87 ERA and 22 strikeouts throughout the tournament, and was named the Most Valuable Player.

In January 2008, Kim was selected for the South Korea national baseball team and participated in the Beijing Olympic Qualification Final Tournament held from March 7 through March 14, 2008 in Taichung, Taiwan. There he helped his team win a spot in the Beijing Summer Olympics by starting two times and going 2–0 with a 1.64 ERA. At the 2008 Olympic Games, Kim contributed to his team's victories as results of 1–0 with a 1.26 ERA and 12 strike outs in 3 games. In the semifinal game against Japan, he gave up one earned run and six hits in eight innings for Korea to get the victory. Kim did not allow a runner past first base after the 3rd inning, when Japan scored on a walk, a sacrifice and a single by Norichika Aoki.

In March 2009, Kim competed for the South Korea national baseball team in the 2009 World Baseball Classic, where they finished runner-up. He started against Japan in South Korea's first game in Tokyo, Japan, but suffered one of his worst games, giving up eight runs in just 1.1 innings of a 14–2 loss to Japan. Kim couldn't get over the disastrous start in Tokyo, struggling in the exhibition games against MLB teams before the start of Round 2. Command of his pitches became a trouble spot, and Team Korea manager Kim In-sik pitched him in relief until the end of the competition.

Year	Venue	Competition	Team	Individual note
2005	South Korea	Asian Junior Baseball Championship	Silver medal	2–2, 1.04 ERA (4 G, 11.2 IP, 3 ER, 12 K)
2006	Cuba	World Junior Baseball Championship	Gold medal	4–0, 0.87 ERA (5 G, 20.2 IP, 2 ER, 22 K); Most Valuable Player
2008	Chinese Taipei	Final Olympic Qualification Tournament	Silver medal	2–0, 1.64 ERA (2 G, 11.0 IP, 2 ER)
2008	China	Olympic Games	Gold medal	1–0, 1.26 ERA (3 G, 14.1 IP, 2 ER)
2009	United States	World Baseball Classic	Silver medal	0–1, 21.60 ERA (4 G, 3.1 IP, 8 ER)
2014	South Korea	2014 Asian Games	Gold medal	0–0, 3.52 ERA (2 G, 7.2 IP, 3 ER)
2015	Japan	WBSC Premier12	Gold medal	0–1, 5.14 ERA (2 G, 7.0 IP, 4 ER, 8 K)
2019	Japan	WBSC Premier12	Silver medal	1–1, 2.89 ERA (2 G, 9.1 IP, 3 ER, 10 K)

== Pitching style ==
With an overhand delivery, Kim pitches a fastball averaging 91–92 mph (tops out at 96 mph) as a starter. His slider is considered above-average and usually sits around 85 mph. He also has a curveball and a forkball. When Kim was young, he struggled with his control and command. However, in 2018, he had improved his control and also his command.

== See also ==
- List of KBO career win leaders
- List of KBO career strikeout leaders
