= List of KBO League seasons =

This is a list of KBO League seasons, providing the final ranking of teams in the KBO League at the end of each season, based on the final regular-season standings plus postseason play including the Korea Series. Sections below are divided based on the number of teams in the league and the season format:

No. of Teams

- 1982–1985: 6 teams
- 1986–1990: 7 teams
- 1991–2012: 8 teams
- 2013–2014: 9 teams
- 2015–present: 10 teams

Season format

From 1982 to 1988, the regular season was divided into two — a spring season and a fall season — with a first-half pennant winner and a latter-half pennant winner. In 1999–2000, the KBO had two divisions of four teams each — the Dream League and the Magic League. From 1989 to 1998, and from 2001 onward, the KBO featured a single division.

== 1982–1985: 6 teams, 2 half-seasons ==
The league began play in 1982 with six teams. There were no changes to the league through 1985, except for the Sammi Superstars being renamed as the Chungbo Pintos that season.

Year	Half-season	1	2	3	4	5	6
1982	1st	OB Bears	Samsung Lions	MBC Chungyong	Haitai Tigers	Lotte Giants	Sammi Superstars
1982	2nd	Samsung Lions	OB Bears	MBC Chungyong	Lotte Giants	Haitai Tigers	Sammi Superstars
1982	Overall	OB Bears	Samsung Lions	MBC Chungyong	Haitai Tigers	Lotte Giants	Sammi Superstars
1983	1st	Haitai Tigers	Sammi Superstars	MBC Chungyong	Lotte Giants	Samsung Lions	OB Bears
1983	2nd	MBC Chungyong	Sammi Superstars	Samsung Lions	Haitai Tigers	OB Bears	Lotte Giants
1983	Overall	Haitai Tigers	MBC Chungyong	Sammi Superstars	Samsung Lions	OB Bears	Lotte Giants
1984	1st	Samsung Lions	OB Bears	MBC Chungyong	Lotte Giants	Haitai Tigers	Sammi Superstars
1984	2nd	Lotte Giants	Haitai Tigers	MBC Chungyong	OB Bears	Samsung Lions	Sammi Superstars
1984	Overall	Lotte Giants	Samsung Lions	OB Bears	MBC Chungyong	Haitai Tigers	Sammi Superstars
1985	1st	Samsung Lions	OB Bears	Haitai Tigers	Lotte Giants	MBC Chungyong	Chungbo Pintos
1985	2nd	Samsung Lions	Lotte Giants	Haitai Tigers	MBC Chungyong	OB Bears	Chungbo Pintos
1985	Overall	Samsung Lions	Lotte Giants	Haitai Tigers	OB Bears	MBC Chungyong	Chungbo Pintos

== 1986–1988: 7 teams, 2 half-seasons ==
The league expanded to seven teams in 1986 with the addition of the Binggrae Eagles. In 1988, the Chungbo Pintos were renamed the Pacific Dolphins.

Year	Half-season	1	2	3	4	5	6	7
1986	1st	Samsung Lions	Haitai Tigers	Lotte Giants	MBC Chungyong	OB Bears	Chungbo Pintos	Binggrae Eagles
1986	2nd	OB Bears	Haitai Tigers	MBC Chungyong	Samsung Lions	Lotte Giants	Binggrae Eagles	Chungbo Pintos
1986	Overall	Haitai Tigers	Samsung Lions	MBC Chungyong	OB Bears	Lotte Giants	Chungbo Pintos	Binggrae Eagles
1987	1st	Samsung Lions	OB Bears	Haitai Tigers	Lotte Giants	MBC Chungyong	Binggrae Eagles	Chungbo Pintos
1987	2nd	Samsung Lions	Haitai Tigers	Lotte Giants	OB Bears	MBC Chungyong	Binggrae Eagles	Chungbo Pintos
1987	Overall	Haitai Tigers	Samsung Lions	Lotte Giants	OB Bears	MBC Chungyong	Binggrae Eagles	Chungbo Pintos
1988	1st	Haitai Tigers	Binggrae Eagles	OB Bears	Lotte Giants	Samsung Lions	Pacific Dolphins	MBC Chungyong
1988	2nd	Haitai Tigers	Samsung Lions	Binggrae Eagles	Lotte Giants	OB Bears	MBC Chungyong	Pacific Dolphins
1988	Overall	Haitai Tigers	Binggrae Eagles	Lotte Giants	Samsung Lions	OB Bears	MBC Chungyong	Pacific Dolphins

== 1989–1990: 7 teams ==
The league discontinued half-season schedules for the 1989 season, while maintaining the same teams. In 1990, MBC Chungyong was renamed LG Twins.

Year	1	2	3	4	5	6	7
1989	Haitai Tigers	Binggrae Eagles	Pacific Dolphins	Samsung Lions	OB Bears	MBC Chungyong	Lotte Giants
1990	LG Twins	Samsung Lions	Haitai Tigers	Binggrae Eagles	Pacific Dolphins	Lotte Giants	OB Bears

== 1991–1998: 8 teams ==
The league expanded to eight teams with the addition of the Ssangbangwool Raiders in 1991. In 1994, the Binggrae Eagles were renamed the Hanwha Eagles, and in 1996, the Pacific Dolphins were renamed the Hyundai Unicorns.

Year	1	2	3	4	5	6	7	8
1991	Haitai Tigers	Binggrae Eagles	Samsung Lions	Lotte Giants	Pacific Dolphins	LG Twins	Ssangbangwool Raiders	OB Bears
1992	Lotte Giants	Binggrae Eagles	Haitai Tigers	Samsung Lions	OB Bears	Pacific Dolphins	LG Twins	Ssangbangwool Raiders
1993	Haitai Tigers	Samsung Lions	OB Bears	LG Twins	Binggrae Eagles	Lotte Giants	Ssangbangwool Raiders	Pacific Dolphins
1994	LG Twins	Pacific Dolphins	Hanwha Eagles	Haitai Tigers	Samsung Lions	Lotte Giants	OB Bears	Ssangbangwool Raiders
1995	OB Bears	Lotte Giants	LG Twins	Haitai Tigers	Samsung Lions	Hanwha Eagles	Pacific Dolphins	Ssangbangwool Raiders
1996	Haitai Tigers	Hyundai Unicorns	Ssangbangwool Raiders	Hanwha Eagles	Lotte Giants	Samsung Lions	LG Twins	OB Bears
1997	Haitai Tigers	LG Twins	Ssangbangwool Raiders	Samsung Lions	OB Bears	Hyundai Unicorns	Hanwha Eagles	Lotte Giants
1998	Hyundai Unicorns	LG Twins	Samsung Lions	OB Bears	Haitai Tigers	Ssangbangwool Raiders	Hanwha Eagles	Lotte Giants

== 1999–2000: 8 teams, 2 divisions ==
In 1999, the OB Bears were renamed the Doosan Bears. The Ssangbangwool Raiders dissolved after the 1999 season, and were replaced in 2000 by SK Wyverns. During these two seasons, the league operated with two divisions of four teams each.

Division	Dream League				Magic League			
Year	1	2	3	4	1	2	3	4
1999	Doosan Bears	Lotte Giants	Hyundai Unicorns	Haitai Tigers	Samsung Lions	Hanwha Eagles	LG Twins	Ssangbangwool Raiders
2000	Hyundai Unicorns	Doosan Bears	Samsung Lions	Haitai Tigers	LG Twins	Lotte Giants	Hanwha Eagles	SK Wyverns

== 2001–2012: 8 teams ==
The league discontinued use of divisions in 2001. The Hyundai Unicorns dissolved after the 2007 season, and were replaced in 2008 by the Woori Heroes. Due to issues with sponsorship, the team was known simply as "Heroes" for part of that season and all of the 2009 season, then became the Nexen Heroes in 2010.

Year	1	2	3	4	5	6	7	8
2001	Doosan Bears	Samsung Lions	Hyundai Unicorns	Hanwha Eagles	KIA Tigers	LG Twins	SK Wyverns	Lotte Giants
2002	Samsung Lions	LG Twins	KIA Tigers	Hyundai Unicorns	Doosan Bears	SK Wyverns	Hanwha Eagles	Lotte Giants
2003	Hyundai Unicorns	SK Wyverns	KIA Tigers	Samsung Lions	Hanwha Eagles	LG Twins	Doosan Bears	Lotte Giants
2004	Hyundai Unicorns	Samsung Lions	Doosan Bears	KIA Tigers	SK Wyverns	LG Twins	Hanwha Eagles	Lotte Giants
2005	Samsung Lions	Doosan Bears	SK Wyverns	Hanwha Eagles	Lotte Giants	LG Twins	Hyundai Unicorns	KIA Tigers
2006	Samsung Lions	Hanwha Eagles	Hyundai Unicorns	KIA Tigers	Doosan Bears	SK Wyverns	Lotte Giants	LG Twins
2007	SK Wyverns	Doosan Bears	Hanwha Eagles	Samsung Lions	LG Twins	Hyundai Unicorns	Lotte Giants	KIA Tigers
2008	SK Wyverns	Doosan Bears	Lotte Giants	Samsung Lions	Hanwha Eagles	KIA Tigers	Heroes	LG Twins
2009	KIA Tigers	SK Wyverns	Doosan Bears	Lotte Giants	Samsung Lions	Heroes	LG Twins	Hanwha Eagles
2010	SK Wyverns	Samsung Lions	Doosan Bears	Lotte Giants	KIA Tigers	LG Twins	Nexen Heroes	Hanwha Eagles
2011	Samsung Lions	SK Wyverns	Lotte Giants	KIA Tigers	Doosan Bears	Hanwha Eagles	LG Twins	Nexen Heroes
2012	Samsung Lions	SK Wyverns	Doosan Bears	Lotte Giants	KIA Tigers	Nexen Heroes	LG Twins	Hanwha Eagles

== 2013–2014: 9 teams ==
The league expanded to nine teams in 2013 with the addition of NC Dinos.

Year	1	2	3	4	5	6	7	8	9
2013	Samsung Lions	Doosan Bears	LG Twins	Nexen Heroes	Lotte Giants	SK Wyverns	NC Dinos	KIA Tigers	Hanwha Eagles
2014	Samsung Lions	Nexen Heroes	NC Dinos	LG Twins	SK Wyverns	Doosan Bears	Lotte Giants	KIA Tigers	Hanwha Eagles

== 2015–present: 10 teams ==
The league expanded to 10 teams in 2015 with the addition of KT Wiz. In 2019, the Nexen Heroes we renamed as the Kiwoom Heroes, and in 2021, SK Wyverns were renamed as SSG Landers.

Year	1	2	3	4	5	6	7	8	9	10
2015	Doosan Bears	Samsung Lions	NC Dinos	Nexen Heroes	SK Wyverns	Hanwha Eagles	KIA Tigers	Lotte Giants	LG Twins	KT Wiz
2016	Doosan Bears	NC Dinos	Nexen Heroes	LG Twins	KIA Tigers	SK Wyverns	Hanwha Eagles	Lotte Giants	Samsung Lions	KT Wiz
2017	KIA Tigers	Doosan Bears	Lotte Giants	NC Dinos	SK Wyverns	LG Twins	Nexen Heroes	Hanwha Eagles	Samsung Lions	KT Wiz
2018	SK Wyverns	Doosan Bears	Hanwha Eagles	Nexen Heroes	KIA Tigers	Samsung Lions	Lotte Giants	LG Twins	KT Wiz	NC Dinos
2019	Doosan Bears	Kiwoom Heroes	SK Wyverns	LG Twins	NC Dinos	KT Wiz	KIA Tigers	Samsung Lions	Hanwha Eagles	Lotte Giants
2020	NC Dinos	Doosan Bears	KT Wiz	LG Twins	Kiwoom Heroes	KIA Tigers	Lotte Giants	Samsung Lions	SK Wyverns	Hanwha Eagles
2021	KT Wiz	Doosan Bears	Samsung Lions	LG Twins	Kiwoom Heroes	SSG Landers	NC Dinos	Lotte Giants	KIA Tigers	Hanwha Eagles
2022	SSG Landers	Kiwoom Heroes	LG Twins	KT Wiz	KIA Tigers	NC Dinos	Samsung Lions	Lotte Giants	Doosan Bears	Hanwha Eagles
2023	LG Twins	KT Wiz	SSG Landers	NC Dinos	Doosan Bears	KIA Tigers	Lotte Giants	Samsung Lions	Hanwha Eagles	Kiwoom Heroes
2024	KIA Tigers	Samsung Lions	LG Twins	Doosan Bears	KT Wiz	SSG Landers	Lotte Giants	Hanwha Eagles	NC Dinos	Kiwoom Heroes
2025	LG Twins	Hanwha Eagles	SSG Landers	Samsung Lions	NC Dinos	KT Wiz	Lotte Giants	KIA Tigers	Doosan Bears	Kiwoom Heroes
2026	Samsung Lions	KT Wiz	KIA Tigers	LG Twins	Doosan Bears	SSG Landers	Lotte Giants	NC Dinos	Hanwha Eagles	Kiwoom Heroes
