= Choi Jeong =

South Korean baseball player (born 1987)

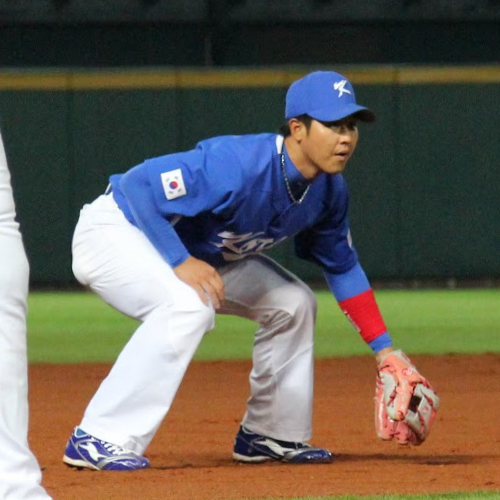
- Choi playing for the South Korea national team in the 2013 World Baseball Classic

SSG Landers – No. 14
- Third baseman
- Born: February 28, 1987 (age 39); Icheon, South Korea
- Bats: Right Throws: Right

KBO debut
- April 2, 2005, for the SK Wyverns

KBO statistics (through 2025)
- Batting average: .286
- Home runs: 518
- Run batted in: 1,624
- Stats at Baseball Reference

Teams
- SK Wyverns / SSG Landers (2005–present)

Career highlights and awards
- 20-20 Club (2012-2013); 5× Korean Series champion (2007, 2008, 2010, 2018, 2022); 8× KBO Golden Glove Award (2011–2013, 2016–2017, 2019, 2021–2022); Korean Series MVP (2008); 10× KBO All-Star (2013, 2017-2020, 2022-2026); Mr. All-Stars (2017); 3× KBO Home Run King (2016–2017, 2021); KBO First 500 Homeruns leader (2025); KBO First 10,000 Appearances (2026)
Medals
Men's baseball
Representing South Korea
World Baseball Classic
Silver medal – second place	2009 Los Angeles	Team
Asian Games
Gold medal – first place	2010 Guangzhou	Team
WBSC Premier12
Silver medal – second place	2019 WBSC Premier12	Team

- Choi Jeong
- Hangul: 최정
- Hanja: 崔廷
- RR: Choe Jeong
- MR: Ch'oe Chŏng

Choi Jeong (Korean: 최정; born February 28, 1987) is a third baseman who has played his whole career for the SK Wyverns (known as the SSG Landers beginning in 2021) in the Korea Baseball Organization. He bats and throws right-handed. Choi is the only member of the 500 home run club to play exclusively in the KBO. His 360 career hit-by-pitches (HBP) is the most in the KBO as well as the world record. He was hit by his 288th pitch in 2021 and surpassed Hughie Jennings' 287 hit-by-pitches.

== Education ==
- Suwon Yushin High School
- Anyang Pyongchon Middle School
- Seongnam Daeil Elementary School

== Amateur career ==
While playing for Yushin High School in Suwon, Gyeonggi-do, South Korea, he batted 4th and threw in the mid-90s, playing all nine positions as a No.1 starting pitcher and position player.

In July 2004, Choi was selected for the South Korea national junior team as a pitcher and participated in the 2004 World Junior Baseball Championship held in Taiwan. Choi started South Korea's first match in the preliminary round, and pitched 5 innings and gave up a run, leading his team to a 5–2 victory over Italy. South Korea eventually won the bronze medal at the competition.

In December 2004, he was named best high school batter of the year.

=== Notable international careers ===
Year	Venue	Competition	Team
2004	Chinese Taipei	World Junior Baseball Championship	Bronze medal

== Professional career ==
Signed by the SK Wyverns, Choi made his pro league debut in the 2005 season. He was successful as both a starting pitcher and a slugger in high school, but finally decided to be a full-time batter for his pro career.

As a third baseman, he had several mediocre seasons, but broke out in 2007 when he had 109 hits, 16 home runs and batted .267.

In 2008, Choi helped his team to become two-time Korean Series Champions, and he was finally named the series MVP.

In 2016 and 2017, Choi became the best power-hitter in the KBO, leading the league in home runs both seasons, with 40 and 46 home runs, respectively.

Choi became a free agent after the 2018 season, staying with the Wyverns at 10.6 billion won in total for six years.

In 2019 Choi led the league in HBP with 26; it was the seventh time he had 20+ HBP in 11 seasons. He was hit by pitch another 20 times in 2020.

On April 24, 2024, Choi hit his 468th career home run, passing Lee Seung-yuop to become the all–time KBO home run leader.

== See also ==
- List of KBO career home run leaders
- List of KBO career RBI leaders
- List of KBO career hits leaders
