= Kim Dong-joo =

South Korean baseball player

Kim Dong-Joo
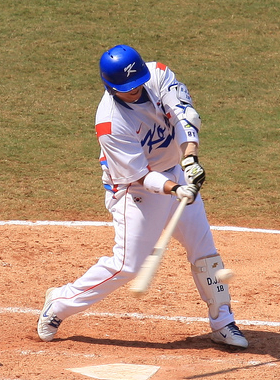
- Kim batting for South Korea in the 2008 Summer Olympics.
- Third baseman
- Born: February 3, 1976 (age 49)
- Batted: Right Threw: Right

KBO debut
- April 11, 1998, for the OB Bears

Last KBO appearance
- 2013, for the Doosan Bears

KBO statistics
- Batting average: .309
- Home runs: 273
- RBI: 1097
- Stats at Baseball Reference

Teams
- OB/Doosan Bears (1997–2014)

Career highlights and awards
- Korea Series champion (2001); 4x KBO League Golden Glove Award (2000, 2003, 2007, 2008)
Medals
Representing South Korea
Men's Baseball
| Bronze medal – third place | 2000 Sydney | Team |
| Gold medal – first place | 2008 Beijing | Team |

Kim Dong-Joo (Korean: 김동주; Hanja: 金東柱; born February 3, 1976, in Seoul, South Korea) is a retired South Korean third baseman, who played his entire career for the Doosan Bears in the KBO League. He batted and threw right-handed.

== Amateur career ==
While attending Baemyung High School in Seoul, South Korea, Kim's main position was shortstop, batting leadoff, but he was considered one of the best high school power pitchers as well. In 1992, Kim swept most of the major individual titles (best pitcher, home run, and runs batted in) in the Phoenix National Championship, the most prestigious annual high school baseball competition in South Korea, pitching to a 0.80 ERA and batting .600 with 10 runs batted in.

Upon graduation from high school in 1994, Kim chose to enter college instead of the Korea Baseball Organization draft, and started his collegiate career at Korea University.

In his freshman year, Kim quit pitching to switch focus to hitting. In the 1994 college season, he batted .308 with 2 home runs and 11 runs batted in, missing half of the season due to injuries.

During his sophomore year in 1995, Kim batted .373 with 4 home runs and 14 runs batted in during the season, and earned the Most Valuable Player award in the national championship. In that same year, Kim was selected for the South Korea national baseball team, and competed in the 1995 Summer Universiade and Intercontinental Cup, manning right field and shortstop.

In 1996, Kim had a true breakout season as a junior. During the season, Kim batted .402 with 11 home runs and 22 runs batted in. He also won the Most Valuable Player award with four home runs and a .625 batting average in the national championship. Prior to the 1996 Summer Olympics in Atlanta, United States, many had expected Kim to be chosen as a key member of the South Korean national team for the first Olympic medal in baseball. However, the manager of Korea University's major rival Yonsei University was named as the manager of the South Korean national team for the Olympics, and Kim was omitted from the final 24-man roster. In part due to the offensive void caused by Kim's absence, South Korea had one of the worst international results, ranked the lowest among the eight teams with a 1–6 record.

As a senior at Korea University in 1997, Kim competed for the South Korea national baseball team in the Asian Baseball Championship. In the round-robin tournament, Kim smacked two home runs off Koji Uehara in the 3–2 loss to Japan. In the final game, Kim hit two home runs off Koji Uehara again to lead South Korea to a 9–8 victory over Japan and win the Asian Championship. In the tournament, Kim batted .538 with an astonishing 9 home runs and 19 runs batted in in only 26 at-bats. Kim finally won the Most Valuable Player award in near-unanimous vote.

=== Notable international careers ===
| Year | Venue | Competition | Team | Individual note |
|---|---|---|---|---|
| 1995 | Japan | Universiade | Silver medal | .333 BA (2-for-6) |
| 1995 | Cuba | Intercontinental Cup | 4th | |
| 1997 | Chinese Taipei | Asian Baseball Championship | Gold medal | .538 BA (14-for-26), 9 HR, 19 RBI, MVP |

== Professional career ==
Upon graduation from Korea University in 1998, Kim made himself eligible for the 1998 Korea Baseball Organization draft, and was selected by the OB Bears in the first round. He made his debut on April 11, 1998, against the Haitai Tigers and got his first hit in that game. In his rookie season, Kim batted a respectable .265 with 24 home runs, 121 hits and 89 runs batted in, appearing in 125 games as a starting right fielder. In November, Kim competed for the South Korea national baseball team in the 1998 Asian Games in Bangkok, Thailand. South Korea won their first Asian Games gold medal, beating Japan 13-1 in the finals, and Kim received a military exemption along with Park Chan-Ho, Seo Jae-Weong and Kim Byung-Hyun by winning gold.

In 1999, Kim switched from right field to third base to focus strictly on hitting. In the 1999 regular season, Kim posted a .321 batting average with 22 home runs, 128 hits and 84 runs batted in. In November, Kim was selected for the South Korean national team again that won the gold medal at the 1999 Asian Baseball Championship in Seoul, South Korea, and helped the team to clinch an Olympic quota slot for 2000, hitting .273 with 2 runs batted in.

In 2000, Kim posted a solid .339 batting average, compiling career-highs in home runs (31), hits (159) and runs batted in. He was runner-up for a batting title, finishing only .001 behind league-leader Park Jong-Ho, 3rd in hits, 4th in runs batted in, and 8th in home runs. He also won his first KBO League Golden Glove Award as a third baseman. In September, Kim competed for the South Korea national baseball team in the 2000 Summer Olympics in Sydney, Australia, where they won their first Olympic medal in baseball by defeating Japan 3-1 in the bronze medal game. In the tournament, he led attack alongside Lee Seung-Yeop and Lee Byung-Kyu, going 7-for-24 with 5 runs batted in.

In 2001, Kim failed to reach the 20 home run club for the first time as a professional, but he managed to hit a grand slam in game 5 of the 2001 Korean Series that helped the Bears beat the Samsung Lions to win their first Korean Series title since 1995.

In 2002, Kim ranked 5th in batting (.318) and 6th in home runs (26), accumulating 132 hits and 79 runs batted in. In October, Kim competed in the 2002 Asian Games in Busan, South Korea, and led his team to their second Asian Game gold medal, hitting .313 with one home run and three runs batted in.

In 2003, Kim had his best year in batting average, hitting .332 in 118 games. He had 137 hits in 401 at-bats, compiling 23 home runs and 89 runs batted in. He won his first career batting title and finished 8th in home runs.

In 2004, Kim failed to post six consecutive seasons with a batting average above .300, finishing the year with a .286 average.

In 2005, Kim batted .300-plus again (.301), but posted only 10 home runs and 81 hits, missing over 30 games due to an injury early in the season.

Prior to the 2006 season, Kim competed for the South Korea national baseball team in the inaugural World Baseball Classic in March 2006. However, he injured his left shoulder while diving into first on an infield single in the top of the 6th inning in Team Korea's first WBC game against Chinese Taipei and thus missed the rest of the tournament. Due to the injury, Kim was sidelined for most of the 2006 season. He eventually came back to play in August, but appeared in only 43 games, posting career lows in nearly every offensive category - a .250 batting average, a .386 slugging percentage, 4 home runs, 16 runs batted in, 19 runs and 35 hits.

In 2007, Kim bounced back from a disappointing previous year, batting .322 with 19 home runs and 78 runs batted in and stealing a career-high 11 bases in the regular season. He ranked 5th in batting, 6th in runs batted in and 7th in home runs, and won his second Golden Glove Award at third base.

Kim enjoyed another solid season in 2008, racking up 104 runs batted in with a .309 batting average, 18 home runs and 112 hits. He was runner-up in runs batted in, 5th in slugging percentage, 4th in on-base percentage, and 9th in home runs. Kim won his third Golden Glove Award at third base, edging out Choi Jeong by 22 votes. In August, Kim competed in the 2008 Summer Olympics in Beijing, China as a member of the South Korean national team that won their first Olympic gold medal. In the tournament, he batted .294 with 5 hits in 17 at-bats, scoring 4 runs as a starting third baseman.

In 2009, Kim posted his best batting average (.353) that ranked 4th best in the league. He was 1st in on-base plus slugging (1.049), 2nd in on-base percentage (.455) and slugging percentage (.593), and eighth for the runs batted in title (86).

=== Notable international careers ===
| Year | Venue | Competition | Team | Individual note |
|---|---|---|---|---|
| 1998 | Thailand | Asian Games | Gold medal | .400 BA (8-for-20), 2 HR, 6 RBI, 6 R |
| 1999 | South Korea | Asian Baseball Championship | Gold medal | .273 BA (3-for-11), 2 RBI |
| 2000 | Australia | Olympic Games | Bronze medal | .292 BA (7-for-24), 5 RBI, 2 R |
| 2002 | South Korea | Asian Games | Gold medal | .313 BA (5-for-16), 1 HR, 3 RBI, 3 R |
| 2003 | Japan | Asian Baseball Championship | Bronze medal | .091 BA (1-for-11) |
| 2006 | United States | World Baseball Classic | Bronze medal | .333 BA (1-for-3) |
| 2007 | Chinese Taipei | Asian Baseball Championship | Silver medal | .167 BA (1-for-6), 1 R, 2 BB |
| 2008 | Chinese Taipei | Final Olympic Qualification Tournament | Silver medal | .400 BA (2-for-5), 1 RBI, 3 R |
| 2008 | China | Olympic Games | Gold medal | .294 BA (5-for-17), 4 R, 4 BB |
