= Ko Young-min =

South Korean baseball player

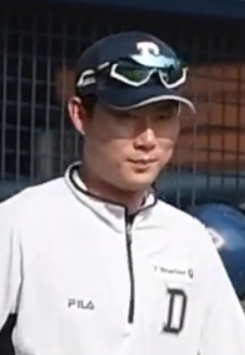
- Ko with the Doosan Bears in 2020

Kia Tigers – No. 90
- Second baseman / Coach
- Born: February 8, 1984 (age 42)
- Batted: Right Threw: Right

KBO debut
- May 4, 2002, for the Doosan Bears

Last appearance
- September 2, 2016, for the Doosan Bears

KBO statistics
- Batting average: .252
- Home runs: 46
- Runs batted in: 292
- Stats at Baseball Reference

Teams
- Doosan Bears (2002–2016)
Medals
Men's baseball
Olympics
Gold medal – first place	2008 Beijing	Team
World Baseball Classic
Silver medal – second place	2009 Los Angeles	Team

Ko Young-min (Korean: 고영민; Hanja: 高永民; born February 8, 1984) is a retired South Korean second baseman who played for the Doosan Bears in the Korea Baseball Organization between 2002 and 2016. He batted and threw right-handed.

== Professional career ==
Upon graduation from Seongnam High School, Ko was drafted by the Doosan Bears in the second round (17th overall) of the 2002 KBO Draft. He had several mediocre season, spending most of his time in the reserve team of the Bears.

In 2006, Ko became a fixture in second base for the Bears as veteran second baseman Ahn Kyung-hyun moved to first base due to deteriorating health. Ko batted a career-high .270 with 85 hits, 29 RBIs, a career-high 5 triples, and 14 stolen bases, appearing 116 games as a starting second baseman.

In 2007, Ko batted .268, compiling a career-high 12 home runs, 119 hits and 66 RBIs while appearing all 126 regular-season games. He led the KBO league in runs (89), and 3rd in stolen bases (36). After the season, he won his first Golden Glove Award at second base.

In 2008, Ko batted .267 with a career-high 70 RBIs, 114 hits, 84 runs, 39 stolen bases and 9 home runs. He led the KBO league in walks (74), and ranked 3rd in runs, 4th in stolen bases and 13th in RBI.

In August 2008, Ko competed for the South Korea national baseball team in the 2008 Summer Olympics, where they won the gold medal in the baseball tournament. Ko's big hit in the Olympics was a three-run homer off of Yang Chien-fu in the 8–7 Korean win over Chinese Taipei.

Prior to the 2009 KBO season, Ko participated in the 2009 World Baseball Classic in March 2009. In the WBC, he batted .308 with 4 hit in 13 at-bats, sharing the starting second base position with Jeong Keun-woo. In Round 2, Ko smacked a solo home run off New York Mets starter Óliver Pérez in the bottom of the 5th inning to lead his team to an 8–2 victory over Mexico.

=== Career stats ===
Year	Team	Pos	G	AB	R	H	2B	3B	HR	RBI	TB	SB	CS	SH	BB	HBP	K	GIDP	E	AVG	OBP	SLG	OPS
2002	Doosan	2B	16	10	1	1	0	0	0	1	1	1	1	0	0	0	1	0	0	.100	.100	.100	.200
2003	Doosan	2B	32	13	2	3	0	0	0	0	3	1	0	0	0	0	3	0	1	.231	.231	.231	.462
2005	Doosan	2B	16	17	2	2	0	0	0	0	2	0	0	0	0	1	9	0	0	.118	.167	.118	.285
2006	Doosan	2B	116	315	38	85	15	5	2	29	116	14	10	8	24	12	59	6	11	.270	.337	.368	.705
2007	Doosan	2B	**126**	444	**89**	119	29	1	12	66	186	36	10	14	61	17	105	9	9	.268	.368	.419	.787
2008	Doosan	2B	**126**	427	84	114	15	3	9	70	162	39	9	13	**74**	14	**109**	10	9	.267	.383	.379	.762
2009	Doosan	2B	85	281	59	66	11	3	6	29	101	12	4	4	33	13	76	3	6	.235	.339	.359	.689
Total		2B	432	1226	216	324	59	9	23	166	470	91	30	35	159	44	286	25	30	.264	.360	.383	.743

Bold = led KBO

=== Notable international careers ===
Year	Venue	Competition	Team	Individual note
2007	Chinese Taipei	Asian Baseball Championship	Silver medal	.462 BA (6-for-13), 2 HR, 5 RBI, 6 R
2008	Chinese Taipei	Final Olympic Qualification Tournament	Silver medal	.368 BA (7-for-19), 4 RBI, 10 R
2008	China	Olympic Games	Gold medal	.208 BA (5-for-24), 1 HR, 3 RBI, 6 R
2009	United States	World Baseball Classic	Silver medal	.308 BA (4-for-13), 1 HR, 1 RBI, 4 R
