= Lee Dae-soo =

South Korean baseball player

SK Wyverns – No. 9
- Infielder
- Born: August 21, 1981 (age 44); Gunsan, North Jeolla
- Bats: Right Throws: Right

KBO debut
- 2002, for the SK Wyverns

KBO statistics (through 2016)
- Batting average: .257
- Hits: 706
- Home runs: 35
- RBI: 295
- Stats at Baseball Reference

Teams
- SK Wyverns (2002–2007); Doosan Bears (2007–2009); Hanwha Eagles (2010–2014); SK Wyverns (2014–present)

- Lee Dae-soo
- Hangul: 이대수
- Hanja: 李大秀
- RR: I Daesu
- MR: I Taesu

Lee Dae-soo (born August 21, 1981) is a South Korean professional baseball infielder for the SK Wyverns of the KBO League.
