= Chong Tae-hyon =

South Korean baseball player

Tae-Hyon Chong

Samsung Lions – No. 73
- Futures team manager
- Born: November 10, 1978 (age 47); Gunsan, South Korea
- Batted: Right Threw: Right

KBO debut
- April 7, 2001, for the SK Wyverns

Last appearance
- 2016, for the Lotte Giants

KBO statistics
- Win–loss record: 46–29
- Saves: 106
- Earned run average: 2.21
- Strikeouts: 559
- Stats at Baseball Reference

Teams
- SK Wyverns (2001–2011); Lotte Giants (2012–2016)

Career highlights and awards
- 2× Korean Series champion (2007, 2008)
Medals
Men's baseball
Olympics
Gold medal – first place	2008 Beijing	Team
Bronze medal – third place	2000 Sydney	Team
World Baseball Classic
Silver medal – second place	2009 Los Angeles	Team
Bronze medal – third place	2006 San Diego	Team
Asian Games
Gold medal – first place	2010 Guangzhou	Team
2015 WBSC Premier12
Gold medal – first place	2015 Tokyo	Team

Tae-Hyon Chong (Korean: 정대현; Hanja: 鄭大炫; born November 10, 1978, in Gunsan, Jeollabuk-do, South Korea) is a retired South Korean underhand pitcher who played 17 years Korea Professional Baseball. He bats and throws right-handed. Chong was considered as a submarine pitcher with an unusual delivery. His primary pitches were a sinking fastball (sinker), usually sitting around 80 mph, and a curveball.

== Amateur career ==
In 1999, as a junior at Kyung Hee University, Chong was selected as a member of the South Korea national baseball team for the 1999 Intercontinental Cup in Sydney. At the Intercontinental Cup, he was 1–1 with a 1.47 ERA and 21 strikeouts in 18.1 innings. In Korea's first game of the round-robin tournament against Cuba, Chong came on to pitch in relief and led his team to a 4–3 victory, which was South Korea's first victory over Cuba at international baseball competitions organized by the IBAF. Besides, he pitched an 8.2 inning shutout victory over the Netherlands with nine strikeouts.

In 2000, as a senior Chong was selected for the South Korea national baseball team for the 2000 Summer Olympics held in Sydney, Australia. As the only amateur player on the 24-man roster, Chong started two critical games against Team USA, facing Roy Oswalt as a starter in both of the games. In the first game against the United States in the round-robin, he pitched seven scoreless innings with five strikeouts, allowing six hits. In the semifinal game against the United States, he gave up only two runs and five hits in 6.1 innings with six strikeouts. Due to his impressive performance, Team South Korea eventually won their first Olympic medal.

=== Notable international careers ===
Year	Venue	Competition	Team	Individual note
1999	Australia	Intercontinental Cup	7th	1-1; 1.47 ERA (3 G, 18.1 IP, 3 ER, 21 K)
2000	Australia	Olympic Games	Bronze medal	0-0; 1.35 ERA (2 G, 13.1 IP, 2 ER, 11 K)

== Professional career ==
In 2001, signed by the SK Wyverns, he had a mediocre rookie season, pitching only 16.2 innings in 18 games as a setup man with a 5.40 ERA and 20 strikeouts, allowing 19 hits and 10 earned runs.

In 2002, Chong had a better season, pitching 42 innings in 24 games with a 3.21 ERA and 30 strikeouts. In November, he was selected for the South Korean national team and led his team to the silver medal at the 2002 Intercontinental Cup. In the round-robin tournament, Chong racked up 11 strikeouts against Panama, allowing 2 runs and 6 hits in 5.2 innings pitched, and pitched a 5-1 complete game victory over Dominican Republic. Chong started for South Korea in the gold medal game, and allowed 2 runs over 6 innings in a 1–2 loss to Cuba. He tied José Ibar of Cuba for the Cup lead in strikeouts.

In the 2003 season, he pitched 51 innings in 37 games, going 4–3 with a 2.29 ERA, 2 saves and 8 holds, allowing 33 hits, 4 home runs and 13 earned runs.

In 2004, Chong appeared in 52 games with 69.1 innings pitched and posted a record of 2–3 with a 2.34 ERA, 2 saves and a career-best 16 holds, allowing 62 hits and 2 home runs.

In 2005, Chong got an injury at his arm and missed the first half of the season, undergoing arthroscopic surgery. He came back from injury in the second half of the season and posted a remarkable ERA of 0.37, racking up 3 saves and 6 holds and allowing only 1 earned run in 24.1 innings pitched.

In 2006, Chong shared the Wyverns' closer role with former Major League Baseball relief pitcher José Cabrera. Chong recorded 15 saves and 11 holds with a 2.57 ERA.

Chong had his career-best season in 2007, when Cabrera left via free agency to the Lotte Giants and Chong became the full-time closer for the Wyverns. Chong posted career-highs in saves (27) and strikeouts (65) with a 0.92 ERA, and allowed only 50 hits and 3 home runs in 78.1 innings pitched. He became the first pitcher to have a sub-1.00 ERA in 70+ innings pitched since 1995, when South Korean pitching legend Sun Dong-Yeol posted a 0.49 ERA in 109.1 innings pitched.

In 2008, Chong was called up for the South Korea national baseball team and participated in the 2008 Summer Olympic Games held in Beijing, China. He led his team to the gold medal, pitching 4 innings with 7 strikeouts, allowing one run and saving two. In the gold medal game, closer Chong contributed to escaping the one-out bases-loaded jam by inducing a game-ending double play along with battery mate Jin Kab-Yong to edge Cuba 3-2.

In 2010, Chong was sidelined in the early part of the season due to a chronic knee problem. He came back to the bullpen in May but was demoted from his role as Wyverns closer, losing the job to Lee Seung-Ho. Chong completed a strong season as a flexible set-up man and an occasional closer as well, posting a 1.40 ERA with 8 holds and 4 saves in 49 games.

=== KBO career statistics ===
Year	Team	ERA	G	W	L	SV	HD	CG	ShO	IP	H	HR	BB	K	R	ER
2001	SK	5.40	18	0	0	0	0	0	0	16.2	19	2	11	20	10	10
2002	SK	3.21	24	1	0	0	0	0	0	42.0	37	2	11	30	15	15
2003	SK	2.29	37	4	3	2	8	0	0	51.0	33	4	20	34	16	13
2004	SK	2.34	52	2	3	2	16	0	0	69.1	62	2	19	50	22	18
2005	SK	0.37	20	1	0	3	6	0	0	24.1	10	0	6	18	1	1
2006	SK	1.94	59	8	4	15	11	0	0	74.1	55	3	26	52	19	16
2007	SK	0.92	60	3	2	27	3	0	0	78.1	50	3	32	65	12	8
2008	SK	2.67	49	4	3	20	0	0	0	60.2	51	4	25	50	18	18
2009	SK	1.20	56	2	3	10	13	0	0	52.2	40	1	21	43	11	7
2010	SK	1.40	49	4	1	4	8	0	0	45.0	31	1	8	47	7	7
2011	SK	1.48	53	3	3	16	11	0	0	52.2	43	1	28	39	12	9
Total		1.93	477	32	22	99	76	0	0	569.0	431	24	207	448	143	122

=== Notable international careers ===
Year	Venue	Competition	Team	Individual note
2002	Cuba	Intercontinental Cup	Silver medal	1-1, 2.18 ERA (3 G, 20.2 IP, 5 ER, 24 K); SO title
2006	United States	World Baseball Classic	Bronze medal	0-0, 5.40 ERA (3 G, 3.1 IP, 2 ER, 6 K)
2007	Chinese Taipei	Asian Baseball Championship	Silver medal	0-0, 1 SV, 0.00 ERA (2 G, 1.2 IP, 0 ER, 2 K)
2008	Chinese Taipei	Final Olympic Qualification Tournament	Silver medal	0-0, 1 SV, 0.00 ERA (2 G, 2.1 IP, 0 ER, 2 K)
2008	China	Olympic Games	Gold medal	0-0, 2 SV, 2.25 ERA (3 G, 4.0 IP, 1 ER, 7 K)
2009	United States	World Baseball Classic	Silver medal	0-0, 0.00 ERA (3 G, 1.2 IP, 0 ER, 2 K)
2010	China	Asian Games	Gold medal	1-0, 0.00 ERA (2 G, 1.1 IP, 0 ER)
