= Junseok Chae =

Korean American engineer (d. 2020)

- 채준석
- Died: 25 March 2020; Phoenix, Arizona, US
- Education: Korea University (BS); University of Michigan (MS, PhD)
- Awards: NSF Career Award
- Scientific career
- Fields: Microelectromechanical systems
- Workplaces: Arizona State University
- Thesis: High-Sensitivity, Low-Noise, Multi-Axis Capacitive Micro-Accelerometers (2003)
- Doctoral advisor: Khalil Najafi

Junseok Chae (Korean: 채준석; died 25 March 2020) was a South Korean engineer and academic administrator specialized in microelectromechanical systems. He was a professor at the Arizona State University (ASU) School of Electrical, Computer, and Energy Engineering and associate dean of research and innovation at ASU Ira A. Fulton Schools of Engineering.

== Life ==
Chae completed a B.S. in metallurgical engineering at Korea University in 1998. He earned a M.S. (2000) and Ph.D. (2003) in electrical engineering and computer science at University of Michigan. His dissertation was titled High-Sensitivity, Low-Noise, Multi-Axis Capacitive Micro-Accelerometers. Chae's doctoral advisor was Khalil Najafi. He was a postdoctoral researcher at the Engineering Research Center for Wireless Integrated Microsystems.

Chae joined Arizona State University (ASU) in 2005 as an assistant professor of engineering. On August 15, 2017, Chae became associate dean of research and innovation at ASU Ira A. Fulton Schools of Engineering. He was a professor in the School of Electrical, Computer, and Energy Engineering. Chae received a National Science Foundation CAREER Award on MEMS protein sensor array.

== Murder ==
Chae went missing after work on 25 March 2020. Police officers in Shreveport, Louisiana contacted Maricopa County Sheriff's Office on 30 March after locating three individuals in possession of Chae's vehicle. Police officers found that Chae was killed in Phoenix, Arizona near the intersection of 7th Street and Arizona State Route 74. On 15 July 2020, police charged 18-year-old Javian Ezell and 18-year-old Gabrielle Austin with first-degree murder, armed robbery, and theft of means of transportation. Chae's remains were found on 17 July 2020 in the Northwest Regional Landfill. He was bludgeoned to death.

Gabrielle Austin entered a plea of guilty to charges of murder in the second degree and abandoning or concealing a dead body on November 2, 2021; subsequently, her co-defendant, Javian Ezell, also entered his plea of guilty to the same charges, on February 25, 2022. They were sentenced on March 25, 2022, in the Maricopa Superior Court. Austin was sentenced to 20 years incarceration for the murder, while Ezell was sentenced to 25 years incarceration.
