= 2007 Korea Professional Baseball season =

Samsung PAVV Pro Baseball 2007 2007 삼성 PAVV 프로야구
- League: Korea Professional Baseball
- Sport: Baseball
- Number of games: 126 per team
- Number of teams: 8

Regular Season
- League champions: SK Wyverns
- Runners-up: Doosan Bears
- Season MVP: Danny Rios (Doosan)

League Postseason
- Semiplayoff champions: Hanwha Eagles
- Playoff champions: Doosan Bears
- Playoff runners-up: Hanwha Eagles

Korean Series
- Champions: SK Wyverns
- Runners-up: Doosan Bears
- Finals MVP: Jae-hyun Kim (SK)

KBO seasons
- ← 2006 2008 →

The 2007 Korea Professional Baseball season, officially known as the Samsung PAVV Pro Baseball 2007 (Korean: 2007 삼성 PAVV 프로야구) for sponsorship reasons, was the 26th season in the history of the Korea Professional Baseball, now known as KBO League.

The champions of the season were the SSG Langers known as SK Wyverns at that time. this was also the last season of the Hyundai Unicorns before their folding at end of the 2007 season.

== Standings ==
	G	W	L	D	Pct.	GB
SK Wyverns	126	73	48	5	0.603	0.0
Doosan Bears	126	70	54	2	0.565	4.5
Hanhwa Eagles	126	67	57	2	0.540	7.5
Samsung Lions	126	62	60	4	0.508	11.5
LG Twins	126	58	62	6	0.483	14.5
Hyundai Unicorns	126	56	69	1	0.448	19.0
Lotte Giants	126	55	68	3	0.447	19.0
Kia Tigers	126	51	74	1	0.408	24.0

== Foreign hitters ==
Team	Player	Position	In KBO since	Batting Average	Home runs	RBI	Notes
Doosan Bears	NONE	N.A.					
Hanwha Eagles	Jacob Cruz	OF	2007	.321	22	85	
Hyundai Unicorns	Cliff Brumbaugh	OF	2003	.308	29	87	
Kia Tigers	Larry Sutton	1B	2005	.274	3	10	
LG Twins	Pedro Valdés	OF	2007	.283	13	72	
Lotte Giants	Félix José	OF	1999	.256	1	12	
Samsung Lions	NONE	N.A.					
SK Wyverns	NONE	N.A.					

== Postseason ==
=== Korean Series ===
The Korean Series involved the SK Wyverns playing against the Doosan Bears in a best-of-seven series. The Bears started the Series well, winning the first two games, but then the Wyverns won the next four to win the Series in six games.
