= Park Jae-sang =

South Korean baseball player

Park Jae-Sang
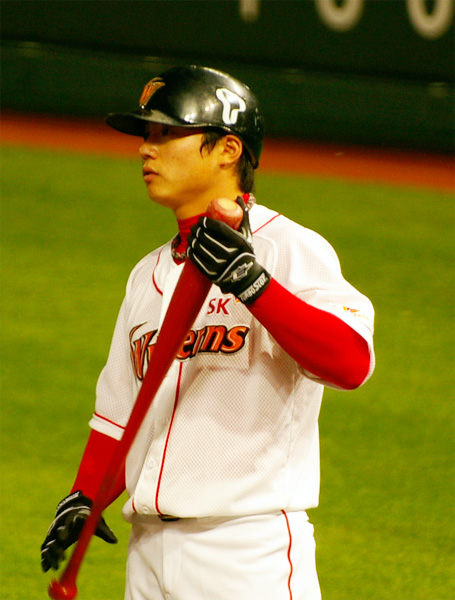

SSG Landers – No. 87
- Second squad third base/ Manager
- Born: July 20, 1982 (age 44)
- Bats: left Throws: left

KBO debut
- 2001 later 2005, for the SK Wyverns

KBO statistics (through 2013)
- Batting Average: 0.261
- Homeruns: 51
- RBI: 316
- Stats at Baseball Reference

Teams
- As player: SK Wyverns (2001–2017); As coach: SK Wyverns (2018–2020); Kiwoom Heroes (2022–2023); Hanwha Eagles (2024); Hanwha Eagles 2nd Team (2025); SSG Landers Reserve Team (2026); As manager: SSG Landers 2nd Team (2027–present)

Park Jae-Sang (Korean: 박재상; Hanja: 朴哉相; born July 20, 1982, in Seongnam, Gyeonggi Province, South Korea) is a South Korean left-handed left fielder who plays for the SK Wyverns in the Korea Baseball Organization.
