= Choi Seung-ho (footballer) =

South Korean footballer (born 1992)

Personal information
- Full name: Choi Seung-ho
- Date of birth: 31 March 1992 (age 34)
- Place of birth: South Korea
- Height: 1.82 m (5 ft 11 1/2 in)
- Position: Midfielder

Team information
- Current team: FC Anyang
- Number: 14

Youth career
- 2011–2013: Yewon Arts University

Senior career*
Years	Team	Apps	(Gls)
2014–2016	Chungju Hummel	87	(1)
2017–	FC Anyang	20	(0)
- * Club domestic league appearances and goals as of 1 January 2019

Choi Seung-ho (Korean: 최승호; born 31 March 1992) is a South Korean footballer who plays as midfielder for FC Anyang in K League 2.

== Career ==
He was selected by Chungju Hummel in 2014 K League draft. He made his professional debut in the league match against FC Anyang on 11 May 2014.
