= Lee Jae-woo (baseball) =

South Korean baseball player

Hanwha Eagles
- Relief pitcher
- Born: February 9, 1980 (age 46)
- Bats: RIght Throws: Right

KBO debut
- 2001, for the Doosan Bears

KBO statistics (through 2011)
- Win–loss record: 33–14
- Saves: 3
- Earned run average: 3.16
- Strikeouts: 344
- Stats at Baseball Reference

Teams
- Doosan Bears (1998–2015); Hanwha Eagles (2016–)
Medals
Men's baseball
Representing South Korea
World Baseball Classic
| Silver medal – second place | 2009 Los Angeles | Team |

- Lee Jae-woo
- Hangul: 이재우
- Hanja: 李載雨
- RR: I Jaeu
- MR: I Chaeu

Lee Jae-woo (Korean: 이재우; Hanja: 李載雨; born February 9, 1980) is a South Korean relief pitcher who plays for the Doosan Bears in the South Korean professional baseball league.

== Career ==
Lee is from Seoul and in 2009, he played on the South Korean national team in the World Baseball Classic.
