= Lee Hei-chun =

South Korean baseball player (born 1979)

Lee Hei-Chun
- Relief pitcher
- Born: March 12, 1979 (age 46); Busan, South Korea
- Bats: Left Throws: Left

NPB debut
- 2009, for the Tokyo Yakult Swallows

KBO statistics (through 2008 season)
- Win–loss record: 53-40
- Earned run average: 4.16
- Strikeouts: 682

Teams
- OB/Doosan Bears (1998–2008, 2011–2013); Tokyo Yakult Swallows (2009–2010); NC Dinos (2014–2015)
- Last updated on: 5 March 2009

Lee Hei-Chun (Korean: 이혜천, born March 12, 1979) is a South Korean former left-handed relief pitcher.
