= Danny Rios =

Spanish baseball player (born 1972)

- Pitcher
- Born: November 11, 1972 (age 53); Madrid, Spain
- Batted: Right Threw: Right

Professional debut
- MLB: May 30, 1997, for the New York Yankees
- KBO: 2002, for the Kia Tigers
- NPB: April 1, 2008, for the Tokyo Yakult Swallows

Last appearance
- MLB: 1998, for the Kansas City Royals
- KBO: 2007, for the Doosan Bears
- NPB: 2008, for the Tokyo Yakult Swallows

MLB statistics
- Win–loss record: 0–1
- Earned run average: 9.31
- Strikeouts: 7

KBO statistics
- Win–loss record: 90–59
- Earned run average: 3.01
- Strikeouts: 807

NPB statistics
- Win–loss record: 2–7
- Earned run average: 5.46
- Strikeouts: 37
- Stats at Baseball Reference

Teams
- New York Yankees (1997); Kansas City Royals (1998); Kia Tigers (2002–2005); Doosan Bears (2005–2007); Tokyo Yakult Swallows (2008)

Career highlights and awards
- 2x KBO Wins Leader (2004, 2007); 1x KBO strikeout Leader (2005); 1x KBO ERA Leader (2007); 1x KBO Golden Gloves Award (2007); KBO MVP (2007)

Daniel Rios (born November 11, 1972) is a former professional baseball player. He played in Major League Baseball (MLB), the KBO League, and Nippon Professional Baseball (NPB). Rios's repertoire included a sharp slider, change-up and fastball around 90 mph.

== Youth ==
Rios's parents were Cuban and he was born in Spain. At age 2, his family immigrated to the United States, where he grew up and went to college at the University of Miami.

== Yankees organization ==
Rios signed as an amateur free agent with the New York Yankees in 1993. He debuted with the GCL Yankees, going 2–1 with a 3.52 ERA and six saves in 24 games. He was the closer on a team that briefly featured Mariano Rivera (who was then a starter). In 1994, Rios had his first year in full-season ball, going 3–2 with 17 saves and a 0.87 ERA in 37 games for the Greensboro Bats and allowing no earned runs (2 runs overall) in 10.1 IP for the Tampa Yankees (2 saves in 9 games). Rios's composite ERA of 0.70 was presumably one of the lowest in all of the minor leagues that year.

Rios remained dazzling in 1995. With Tampa, he had a 2.00 ERA, 0–4 record, 24 saves and 72 strikeouts in 67.1 IP. He finished 53 games, most in the Florida State League.

Rios moved to the cusp of the major leagues in 1996. He went 3–1 with 17 saves and a 2.09 ERA for the Norwich Navigators and 4–1 with a 1.95 ERA in 24 games for the Columbus Clippers. Baseball America rated him as the #9 prospect in the Yankee system, one spot ahead of fellow right-hander Tony Armas Jr.

Rios spent most of 1997 with Columbus, doing an effective job, if not as impressive as his prior three years. In 58 games, he went 7–4 with 3 saves and a 3.08 ERA. He was four games pitched behind teammate Dale Polley for the International League lead. He made his major league debut in rough form on May 30, relieving Ramiro Mendoza with two on and one out against the Boston Red Sox. He promptly served up back-to-back home runs to Wil Cordero and Mo Vaughn, the first two batters he faced. An inning later, Scott Hatteberg added another homer. Rios had allowed 3 runs in 1 2/3 IP, all on homers. He returned to Columbus but came back to the Yankees for a game late in the year, replacing Hideki Irabu with one on and one out in the 7th inning on September 5. He allowed three straight singles, bringing in one inherited runner and one another score. After back-to-back singles to open the 8th, he was replaced by Graeme Lloyd, ending a horrible rookie year in the majors – 9 hits and 5 runs in 2 1/3 innings plus three inherited runners plated.

== Royals system ==
The Yankees waived Rios in March 1998 and he was picked up by the Kansas City Royals. He threw in five games early in the year for Kansas City, but struggled. He went 0–1 with a 6.14 ERA and would never again pitch in the major leagues, though he was just 25. He went 6–7 with one save and a 5.63 ERA for the 1998 Omaha Royals, being used regularly as a starting pitcher for the first time in his professional career.

Rios was moved back to the bullpen in 1999 but the results were not good. He went 10–4 with Omaha to tie for the team lead in wins and saved four games, but had a 6.07 ERA.

== Independent leagues and Mexico ==
In 2000, Rios moved to the Newark Bears, going 2–3 with a 4.26 ERA. He went to the Mexican League, where he was 6–3 with a 3.12 ERA for the Algodoneros de Union Laguna.

Rios was 18–5 with a 2.98 ERA for Union Laguna in 2001, finishing 9th in the Mexican League in ERA. He led the Liga in victories.

== South Korea ==
Rios drew notice overseas and was picked up by the KIA Tigers of the KBO League in 2002. He helped the club finish second in his first season there, going 14–5 with 13 saves and a 3.14 ERA. He was fourth in the Korea Baseball Organization in ERA. He fell to 10–13 in 2003, but his 3.82 ERA still ranked ninth in the KBO.

In 2004, Rios led the KBO with 223 innings pitched. He went 17–8 with a 2.87 ERA, finishing fourth in ERA behind Park Myung-hwan, Gary Rath, and Bae Young-soo. He tied Rath and Bae for the league lead in wins (though Bae had six fewer losses than Rios and Rath).

At age 32, the right-hander was traded mid-season to the Doosan Bears. Cumulatively, he was 15–12 with a 3.51 ERA, third in the KBO in ERA behind Son Min-han and Kim Won-hyeong. He battled control problems, walking 147 in 205 1/3 innings pitched, but also tied Bae for the KBO lead in strikeouts (also 147).

Rios was 12–16 with a 2.90 ERA in 2006 for Doosan.

Rios finished the 2007 season 22–5 with a 2.07 ERA, leading the league in wins and ERA. He became the first 20-game winner in the KBO since Chung Min-tae won that many in 1999 (KBO schedules at that point were only 126 games, making 20-game winners rarer than in the US). He was the first foreigner to win 20 games in a year (not counting Japanese natives of South Korean descent). He won five more games than runners-up Ryu Hyun-jin and Kenny Rayborn, and his ERA was 0.77 was ahead of runner-up Chae Byung-ryong. He whiffed 147, second in the KBO to Ryu, to miss out on the "Pitching Triple Crown". Rios' 22 wins was the highest total by a pitcher since Jang Myeong-bu in 1983. Rios became the fifth pitcher in KBO history to have won 10+ games in six consecutive seasons, following Kim Si-jin (1983–1988), Sun Dong-yeol (1986–1991), Lee Kang-chul (1989–1998), and Jung Min-chul (1992–1999). Rios continued his dominance in the postseason. In game one of the 2007 Korean Series, Rios threw a four-hit shutout against the SK Wyverns. Rios capped off the season by winning the 2007 KBO League Most Valuable Player Award.

Rios finished the 2007 season with a career KBO record of 90–59, an ERA of 3.01, and 807 strikeouts.

== NPB: Doping case, suspension, and retirement ==
In June 2008, while playing for the Yakult Swallows in the Nippon Professional Baseball (NPB), Rios tested positive for a metabolite of the anabolic steroid stanozolol and was subsequently banned from Japanese baseball for a year. He never played professionally again.
