= Hong Sung-heon =

South Korean baseball player

- Designated hitter
- Born: October 21, 1976 (age 49)
- Batted: Right Threw: Right

KBO debut
- 1999, for the Doosan Bears

Last KBO appearance
- August 9, 2016, for the Doosan Bears

KBO statistics
- Batting average: .301
- Home runs: 208
- Runs batted in: 1,120
- Stats at Baseball Reference

Teams
- Doosan Bears (1999–2008); Lotte Giants (2009–2012); Doosan Bears (2013–2016)

Career highlights and awards
- 3x Korean Series champion (2001, 2015, 2016); 2x KBO All-Star Game MVP (2006, 2010); KBO Rookie of the Year (1999); 6x KBO Golden Glove Award winner (2001, 2004, 2008–2011)
Medals
Men's Baseball
Representing South Korea
Bronze medal – third place	2000 Sydney	Team

Hong Sung-heon (Korean: 홍성흔; born October 21, 1976, in Hoengseong County, Gangwon-do, South Korea) is a former South Korean designated hitter. He batted and threw right-handed.

Hong was a catcher, and had been regularly called up to the South Korea national baseball team as a starting catcher until he was converted to a designated hitter in 2007.

== Amateur career ==
In June 1998, as a senior at Kyung Hee University, Hong got his first call-up to the South Korea national baseball team for the 4-Nation Friendly Baseball Championship in Kobe, Japan.

In July 1998, Hong participated in the 1998 Baseball World Cup. South Korea eventually claimed the silver medal two times in a row, and as a starting catcher he led the team attack alongside cleanup hitter Choi Hee-seop and Park Han-yi.

In November 1998, Hong was called up to the South Korean national team for the 1998 Asian Games, which included professional players for the first time ever. He was the only amateur catcher on the roster.

=== Notable international careers ===
Year	Venue	Competition	Team	Individual note
1998	Italy	Baseball World Cup	Silver medal	.229 BA (8-for-35), 7 RBI
1998	Thailand	Asian Games	Gold medal	.143 BA (1-for-7), 1 R

== Professional career ==
=== Doosan Bears ===
Hong was drafted by the Doosan Bears in the first round of the KBO Draft after graduating from Kyung Hee University in 1999. In his first season, he batted a respectable .258 with 16 home runs and 63 RBI, and earned the starting position behind the plate in the Bears. Hong ended up earning KBO Rookie of the Year Award honors, becoming the first Bear since Yoon Suk-Hwan in 1984 to win the award.

In 2000, his batting average rose to .290, leading the league in batting average until the All-Star break. In September, Hong was selected as a member of the South Korea national baseball team that won their first olympic medal at the 2000 Summer Olympics in Sydney, Australia. In the tourney, he batted .240 with a home run and 3 RBI, sharing a starting position behind the plate with Park Kyung-Oan of the Hyundai Unicorns.

In 2004, Hong led the KBO league in hits (165), appearing in 133 all regular season games as a starting catcher. He was third in batting average (.329) and fifth in RBI (86), smacking 14 home runs and stealing 10 bases, and won his second Golden Glove Award as a catcher.

During the 2005 season, due to his hamstring injury and defensive deficiencies, Hong began to split his time between catching and designating hitting. After the season, he announced that he would not give up his catching position in the Bears, and his intention came into conflict with the team's manager Kim Kyung-Moon.

In the beginning of the 2007 season, he was sidelined with hamstring injury, and the Bears' backup catcher Chae Sang-Byung filled Hong's void behind the plate. Hong came back as the starting catcher for the Bears in the middle of the season. His offense, however, did not perform at the level expected, as he spent the majority of the season platooning with Chae Sang-Byung, and amid much controversy the manager Kim eventually named Chae the starter for the end of the season.

In 2008, as a full-time designated hitter, Hong finished runner-up in batting average with .331 and fourth in hits (140). After the season, he won his third Golden Glove Award as a designated hitter. In a broadcast program, which appeared after retirement, he introduced a story of his past experience with Stephen Blas' syndrome. Steven Blass syndrome refers to a syndrome in which a baseball player suffers from poor control, such as a sudden strike. It is a term derived from a real example of Steve Blas, a right-hander who led Pittsburgh to the World Series title in 1971. Hong Sung-heun's frequent defensive errors at the time were also due to skills problems caused by suffering from Steven Blas syndrome.

=== Lotte Giants ===
Hong became a free agent after the 2008 season and signed a four-year deal with the Lotte Giants on November 27, 2008.

In 2009, Hong noyce was runner-up in batting average again with a career-high .371, only .001 behind league-leader Park Yong-Taik of the LG Twins. On December 11, 2009, he won his fourth the Golden Glove Award in Designated hitter nomination for two consecutive years.

In 2010, Hong was runner-up in batting average, hits, RBI, Slugging percentage, OPS, third in On-base percentage and fourth in Homeruns. On July 24, 2010, he became All-star Game MVP. He also became the most voted All-star game player of KBO history. On December 11, 2010, he won his fifth the Golden Glove Award in Designated hitter nomination for three consecutive years.

He announced his retirement from active service on November 21, 2016. He has since moved to the U.S. under Park Chan-ho's introduction to take training as a leader and coach the San Diego Padres Rookie team.

=== Awards and honors ===
- 2001 Golden Glove Award (Catcher)
- 2004 Golden Glove Award (Catcher)
- 2008 Golden Glove Award (Designated hitter)
- 2009 Golden Glove Award (Designated hitter)
- 2010 Golden Glove Award (Designated hitter)
- 2011 Golden Glove Award (Designated hitter)

=== Interesting record ===
No. 2 batting average for the third consecutive year. (2008~2010) First catcher to record the most hits in a season. (2004)

=== Notable international careers ===
Year	Venue	Competition	Team	Individual note
1999	South Korea	Asian Baseball Championship	Gold medal	.125 BA (1-for-8), 1 R
2000	Australia	Olympic Games	Bronze medal	.240 BA (6-for-25), 1 HR, 3 RBI, 3 R
2002	South Korea	Asian Games	Gold medal	.240 BA (4-for-15), 2 RBI, 2 R
2006	United States	World Baseball Classic	Bronze medal	.500 BA (2-for-4), 1 RBI

== Filmography ==
=== Television shows ===
Year	Title	Role	Notes	Ref.
2021–present	Mr. House Husband 2	Cast Member	Season 2	
2021	Wild Cave	Cast Member		
2022	Back to the Ground	Participant		
2022	Round Table	Contestant	Chuseok Special	
2022	The First Business in the World	Contestant		
2023	World's First Merchant	Contestant	Season 2	

== Awards and nominations ==
Name of the award ceremony, year presented, category, nominee of the award, and the result of the nomination
Award ceremony	Year	Category	Nominee / Work	Result	Ref.
KBS Entertainment Awards	2021	Rookie Award in Reality Category	Mr. House Husband 2	Won	
KBS Entertainment Awards	2021	Best Teamwork Award	Mr. House Husband 2	Won	

== Personal life ==
Hong married former model Kim Jung-im in 2004. They have a son and a daughter.

== See also ==
- List of KBO career RBI leaders
- List of KBO career hits leaders
