= Matt Randel =

Matthew Randel
- Pitcher
- Born: February 15, 1977 (age 49); Portland, Oregon, United States
- Batted: Right Threw: Right

Professional debut
- NPB: 2000, for the Fukuoka Daiei Hawks
- KBO: 2005, for the Doosan Bears

Last appearance
- NPB: 2004, for the Yomiuri Giants
- KBO: 2008, for the Doosan Bears

NPB statistics
- Win–loss record: 4–3
- Earned run average: 5.84
- Strikeouts: 48

KBO statistics
- Win–loss record: 49–32
- Earned run average: 3.41
- Strikeouts: 467
- Stats at Baseball Reference

Teams
- Fukuoka Daiei Hawks (2000); Yomiuri Giants (2003–2004); Doosan Bears (2005–2008)

Matthew Randel (born February 15, 1977) is an American- born Korean former professional baseball pitcher. Randel was an unusual American pitcher in that over 80% of his baseball career was played in Asia. He dropped out of college after two seasons at Lewis-Clark State College in 1999. He was invited to tryout for the Fukuoka Daiei Hawks in Japan. He spent two years with the Hawks, playing mostly for their lower-tier team. He went back home to the United States in 2001, returning to baseball in 2002 in Fort Worth, Texas. The following year he returned to Japan where his career fizzled out after two years. His career was revived once again when a former teammate, Gary Rath, mentioned Randel to the Doosan Bears of the KBO League. There he was able to establish himself as a reliable starter for four seasons until an injury forced him to retire.

== Early life ==
As a young child, Randel had no interest in playing baseball, but his father made him join a youth league when he was six and his attitude toward the sport eventually changed. His high school career was in Ridgefield, Washington, where he went to high school at Ridgefield High School. Here, he was a four-year letterman and three-time team MVP. In his Junior and Senior year, he was a dominant pitcher in the 1A Trico League and averaged 15 strike outs each game. Randel was the 84th-round pick of the Los Angeles Dodgers in the 1995 amateur draft. Instead of signing with the Dodgers, he accepted an athletic scholarship with Lewis-Clark State College in Lewiston, ID. In his first year, he was the winning pitcher in the NAIA World Series Championship game. He threw a four hit, 10-strikeout complete game in a 9–0 victory against St. Ambrose, Iowa.

== Playing career ==
=== Fukuoka Daiei Hawks ===
In 2000, Randel made his professional debut in Nippon(Japanese) Professional Baseball with the Fukuoka Daiei Hawks Randel. He faced three batters, gave up two hits and struck out 1 in 0.1 innings. At the end of the season, Randel returned home to the United States and took a year off from baseball.

=== Fort Worth Cats ===
In 2002, Randel was playing in Fort Worth Texas in the (Independent) Central League with the Fort Worth Cats. He started in 5 games, and had a 3.05 ERA with 75 strikeouts; and had a record of 4 wins,5 losses, and 1 save.
