= Jeong Keun-woo =

South Korean baseball player

- Jeong in 2020
- Born: October 2, 1982 (age 43); Pusan, South Korea
- Bats: Right Throws: Right

KBO debut
- April 2, 2005, for the SK Wyverns

KBO statistics (through 2020 season)
- Batting average: .302
- Home runs: 121
- RBI: 722
- Stolen bases: 371
- Stats at Baseball Reference

Teams
- SK Wyverns (2005–2013); Hanwha Eagles (2014-2019); LG Twins (2020)

Career highlights and awards
- 3× Korean Series champion (2007, 2008, 2010); 3× KBO League Golden Glove Award (2006, 2009, 2013)
Medals
Men's baseball
Olympics
Gold medal – first place	2008 Beijing	Team
World Baseball Classic
Silver medal – second place	2009 Los Angeles	Team
2015 WBSC Premier12
Gold medal – first place	2015 Tokyo	Team

- Jeong Keun-woo
- Hangul: 정근우
- Hanja: 鄭根宇
- RR: Jeong Geunu
- MR: Chŏng Kŭnu

Jeong Keun-woo (Korean: 정근우; Hanja: 鄭根宇; born October 2, 1982) is a former second baseman and shortstop who last played for the SK Wyverns, Hanhwa Eagles, and LG Twins in the Korea Baseball Organization. He bats and throws right-handed.

== Amateur career ==
Jeong attended Busan High School in Busan, South Korea. In 1999, he was selected for the South Korea national junior team and participated in the 1999 World Junior Baseball Championship held in Kaohsiung City, Taiwan. In 2000, he was selected again for the South Korea national junior team that won the 2000 World Junior Baseball Championship in Edmonton, Alberta, Canada. He led the attack alongside future pro baseball stars Choo Shin-soo, Kim Tae-kyun and Lee Dae-ho, batting .333 with 3 RBIs as a starting second baseman.

Upon leaving high school, Jeong was considered the top infielder prospect for the 2001 KBO Draft, but went undrafted. Instead, he played college baseball at Korea University.

In his sophomore year at Korea University, he made his first appearance for the South Korea national baseball team at the 2002 Intercontinental Cup, where they claimed the silver medal.

In November 2003, Jeong competed for the South Korean national team as an amateur player again in the 2003 Baseball World Cup. In the tournament, he batted .308 with 2 home runs and 10 RBIs, leading the team in RBI. In Team Korea's second game against Russia, he went 5-for-6 with a home run and 5 RBIs to lead his team to a 26-3 victory.

In 2004, as a senior he participated in the 2nd World University Baseball Championship and led his team to the bronze medal, winning the RBI title.

=== Notable international careers ===
Year	Venue	Competition	Team	Individual note
1999	Chinese Taipei	World Junior Baseball Championship	5th	
2000	Canada	World Junior Baseball Championship	Gold medal	.333 BA (9-for-27), 3 RBI
2002	Cuba	Intercontinental Cup	Silver medal	.294 BA (5-for-15)
2003	Cuba	Baseball World Cup	8th	.308 BA (12-for-39), 2 HR, 10 RBI, 9 R
2004	Chinese Taipei	World University Baseball Championship	Bronze medal	1st in RBI

== Professional career ==
Drafted by the SK Wyverns in the second round (15th overall) of the 2005 KBO Draft, Jeong made his pro league debut on April 2, 2005. He had a disappointing rookie season, managing only a .193 batting average.

However, the next season he batted .284 with 45 stolen bases (2nd in the league) and 122 hits, and won the KBO League Golden Glove Award at second base. After the 2006 KBO season, Jeong was selected for the South Korea national team, and won a bronze medal at the 2006 Asian Games in Doha, Qatar.

Jeong had a .323 batting average (4th in the league) in the 2007 KBO season, the first season of a .300-plus batting average, leading his team to the Korean Series Championship. As a member of the South Korea national team, he competed in the 2007 Asian Baseball Championship and 2008 Final Olympic Qualification Tournament.

In the 2008 KBO season, Jeong hit .300-plus once again (.317), and ranked 2nd in hits (154) and 3rd in stolen bases (40).

On July 16, 2008, Jeong was selected for South Korea national team in the 2008 Olympics. In Beijing, he batted 9-for-29 with 4 runs and a RBI, playing as a utility infielder. In the team's third game of round-robin play against Canada, he smacked a solo home run off Mike Johnson in the third inning that held up for a 1-0 win for South Korea.

On December 11, 2009, he obtained his second Golden Glove Award as a second baseman, and in 2013 he won his third Golden Glove.

He moved through the second draft of the KBO League in 2020.

=== Awards and honors ===
- 2006 Golden Glove Award (Second baseman)
- 2009 Golden Glove Award (Second baseman)
- 2013 KBO Golden Glove 2nd prize
- 2016 1st place in KBO regular league

=== Career statistics ===
Through 2009 season.

Year	Team	G	AB	R	H	2B	3B	HR	RBI	TB	SB	CS	SH	BB	HBP	K	GIDP	E	AVG	OBP	SLG	OPS
2005	SK	52	88	11	17	2	0	0	5	19	4	2	10	4	4	13	3	7	.193	.236	.216	.452
2006	SK	120	430	69	122	19	4	8	42	173	45	10	17	36	4	60	3	8	.284	.333	.402	.735
2007	SK	111	341	62	110	24	2	9	44	165	24	10	9	35	6	44	6	20	.323	.386	.484	.870
2008	SK	124	491	73	154	20	4	8	58	206	40	**20**	10	46	3	53	9	15	.314	.369	.420	.789
2009	SK	127	480	98	168	29	4	9	59	232	53	13	7	55	4		8		.350	.437	.483	.920
Total		534	1850	313	571	94	14	34	208	795	166	65	53	176	21	170	29	50	.312	.352	.434	.753

Bold = led KBO

=== Notable international careers ===
Year	Venue	Competition	Team	Individual note
2006	Qatar	Asian Games	Bronze medal	.350 BA (7-for-20), 3 RBI, 8 R, 3 SB, 4 BB
2007	Chinese Taipei	Asian Baseball Championship	Silver medal	.250 BA (2-for-8), 2 RBI, 2 R
2008	China	Olympic Games	Gold medal	.310 BA (9-for-29), 1 HR, 1 RBI, 5 R
2009	United States	World Baseball Classic	Silver medal	.292 BA (7-for-24), 1 HR, 2 RBI, 7 R
2010	China	Guangzhou Asian Games	Gold medal	.563 BA (9-for-16), 3 RBI, 6 R, 3 BB

== Filmography ==
=== Television shows ===
Year	Title	Role	Notes	Ref.
2021	Game of Blood	Contestant		
2022	All Table Tennis!	Cast Member		
2022	Youth Baseball Team	Head coach		
2022	Strongest Baseball	Cast Member		

== See also ==
- List of KBO career stolen bases leaders
