= Kenny Rayborn =

American baseball player

- Pitcher
- Born: November 22, 1974 (age 51); Hattiesburg, Mississippi, U.S.
- Bats: Right Throws: Right
- Stats at Baseball Reference

Teams
- Hiroshima Toyo Carp (2005); SK Wyverns (2007–2008)

George Kenneth Rayborn (born November 22, 1974, in Hattiesburg, Mississippi) is an American former professional baseball player. Rayborn was drafted by the Seattle Mariners in the 67th round of the 1993 Major League Baseball draft, but did not sign. He was later drafted by the Boston Red Sox in the 17th round of the 1997 Major League Baseball draft, and did sign. Rayborn played in the Red Sox minor league system in 1997 and 1998, then played for the Greenville Bluesmen of the Texas–Louisiana League in 1999.

From 2000 to 2005, he played in the Mariners and Cleveland Indians minor league systems and in Winnipeg Goldeyes. Spending his winter seasons playing for the Caracas Leones in Venezuela. Rayborn played for the Hiroshima Toyo Carp of the Japanese Central League in 2005 and the LaNew Bears of the Taiwan Professional Baseball League in 2006 (winners of the CPBL title). In 2007 and 2008 he pitched for SK Wyverns of the Korea Baseball Organization winning the KBL title both years. He played for the Southern Maryland Blue Crabs in the Atlantic League in 2009 and 2010 finishing each of the seasons in Taiwan for the Uni-Lions. He officially during the 2011 baseball season.
