= Chei Byung-yong =

South Korean baseball player

SK Wyverns – No. 45
- Relief pitcher
- Born: April 25, 1982 (age 43); Gunsan, North Jeolla
- Bats: Right Throws: Right

KBO debut
- April 7, 2002, for the SK Wyverns

KBO statistics (through June 9, 2019)
- Win–loss record: 84–73
- Earned run average: 4.21
- Strikeouts: 968
- Holds: 29
- Saves: 22
- Stats at Baseball Reference

Teams
- SK Wyverns (2002–2023)

- Chei Byung-yong
- Hangul: 채병용
- Hanja: 蔡秉龍
- RR: Chae Byeongyong
- MR: Ch'ae Pyŏngyong

Chei Byung-yong (Korean: 채병용; born April 25, 1982) is a former South Korean professional baseball pitcher for the SK Wyverns of the KBO League.
