= Chae Sang-byung =

South Korean baseball player and coach

- Catcher
- Born: December 18, 1979 (age 46)
- Bats: Right Throws: Right

KBO debut
- April 2, 2002, for the Hanwha Eagles

KBO statistics (through 2012 season)
- Batting average: .212
- Home runs: 18
- RBI: 100
- Stats at Baseball Reference

Teams
- Players Career: Hanwha Eagles (2002–2003); Doosan Bears (2004–2009); Samsung Lions (2009–2014); Coach Career: Samsung Lions (2015–)

Chae Sang-byung (Korean: 채상병; Hanja: 蔡尙秉; born December 18, 1979, in Seoul) is a former South Korean catcher who played for the Hanwha Eagles, Doosan Bears, and Samsung Lions in the Korea Baseball Organization.

== Amateur career ==
Chae attended Yonsei University in Seoul, South Korea. In 1999, as a sophomore, he made his first appearance for the South Korea national baseball team, and competed in international matches for three-consecutive years until graduation.

In 2001, Chae competed in the Asian Baseball Championship held in Taiwan, and led his team to the silver medal. He was finally named to the All-Star team of the competition.

=== Notable international careers ===
Year	Venue	Competition	Team	Individual note
1999	Australia	Intercontinental Cup	7th	
2001	Chinese Taipei	Asian Baseball Championship	Silver medal	All-Star (C)

== Professional career ==
Signed by the Hanwha Eagles in January 2002, Chae remained on the first-team roster in his first professional year. In October 2002, he was selected for the South Korea national baseball team that finished runner-up at the 2002 Intercontinental Cup in Havana, Cuba. In Team Korea's second game in the round robin phase, Chae hit a solo home run in the 4th inning to lead his team to an 11-4 victory over Brazil.

However, he played in only 29 games in his rookie season and 25 games in 2003. At the end of 2003, Chae was traded to the Doosan Bears, but still, he hardly got opportunities to play, serving as backup to Hong Sung-Heon.

After the 2004 season, he temporarily left the Doosan Bears for the military service, and spent two seasons for the duty.

Returned to the Doosan Bears in 2007, Chae filled in as a starting catcher for Hong Sung-Heon who went on the disabled list. In the middle of the 2007 season, Hong came back from his injury, but Bears’ manager Kim Kyung-Moon allowed Chae to compete with Hong for the starting job, and amid much controversy the manager Kim named Chae the starter for the rest of the season. On September 25, Chae hit an inside-the-park grand slam, which was the 3rd in the KBO league history. He finished the 2007 season, his first KBO season as a starting catcher, batting a career-high .237 with 7 home runs and 30 RBIs in 91 games. After the 2007 season, he was selected to be a reserve member of the South Korean national team for the 2007 Asian Baseball Championship.

In the 2008 season, Chae played in 112 games as a starting catcher, setting career-highs in hits (73) and RBI (42), but struggled at the plate, batting .215 with 5 home runs.

Due to the poor offensive performance in the previous year and a persistent shoulder injury, Chae started the 2009 season in the second (reserve) team of the Bears. On July 16, he was eventually traded to the Samsung Lions. Chae finished the 2009 season with a disappointing batting average of .178 and 2 home runs, appearing in only 49 games as a platoon or backup catcher.

=== Notable international careers ===
Year	Venue	Competition	Team	Individual note
2002	Cuba	Intercontinental Cup	Silver medal	.125 BA (1-for-8), 1 HR, 1 RBI, 1 R
