= Lee Seung-ho (baseball, born 1976) =

South Korean baseball player

Lee Seung-Ho
- Relief pitcher
- Born: August 23, 1976 (age 48)
- Batted: Left Threw: Left

KBO debut
- 1999, for the LG Twins

Last KBO appearance
- 2011, for the SK Wyverns

KBO statistics
- Win–loss record: 51–52
- Earned run average: 4.20
- Strikeouts: 721

Teams
- LG Twins (1999–2008); SK Wyverns (2009–2011)

Lee Seung-Ho (Korean: 이승호; Hanja: 李承浩; born August 23, 1976 in Seoul, South Korea) is a South Korean former baseball relief pitcher for the SK Wyverns of the KBO League. He bats and throws left-handed.
