= List of KBO career win leaders =

The following is the current leaderboard for career wins in KBO League Korean baseball.

== Players with 120 or more wins ==
**Bold**	denotes active player. (Note: A player is considered inactive if he has announced his retirement or not played for a full season.)

- Stats updated at the end of the 2026 season.

Rank	Player	Wins
1	Song Jin-woo	210
2	**Yang Hyeon-jong**	198 (↑12)
3	**Kim Kwang-hyun**	180 (0)
4	Jung Min-cheul	161
5	Lee Kang-chul	152
6	Sun Dong-yeol	146
7	Bae Young-soo	138
8	Yun Sung-hwan	135
9	Kim Won-hyeong	134
10	Chang Won-jun	132
11	Lim Chang-yong	130
12	Kim Yong-soo	126
	Cho Kye-Hyeon	126
	**Ryu Hyun-jin**	126 (↑9)
14	Chung Min-tae	124
	Kim Si-jin	124
16	Son Min-han	123
17	Kim Sang-jin	122
18	Jang Won-sam	121
19	Han Yong-deok	120

== See also ==
- List of KBO career strikeout leaders
- List of KBO career saves leaders
- List of KBO career home run leaders
- List of KBO career RBI leaders
- List of KBO career stolen bases leaders
- List of KBO career hits leaders
