= Lee Jae-ik (baseball) =

South Korean baseball player (born 1994)

Samsung Lions – No. 45
- Pitcher
- Born: March 18, 1994 (age 32); Ansan, South Korea
- Bats: Left Throws: Left

KBO debut
- July 10, 2020, for the Samsung Lions

KBO statistics (through March 28, 2024)
- Win–loss record: 6–5
- Earned run average: 6.47
- Strikeouts: 53
- Stats at Baseball Reference

Teams
- Samsung Lions (2020–present)

Lee Jae-ik (Korean: 이재익; born March 18, 1994, in Ansan, Gyeonggi) is a South Korean pitcher for the Samsung Lions in the Korea Baseball Organization (KBO).
