= Yun Sung-hwan =

South Korean baseball player

- Starting pitcher
- Born: October 8, 1981 (age 44); Busan, South Korea
- Batted: Right Threw: Right

KBO debut
- April 4, 2004, for the Samsung Lions

Last KBO appearance
- 2020, for the Samsung Lions

KBO statistics
- Win–loss record: 135–106
- Earned run average: 4.23
- Strikeouts: 1,357
- Stats at Baseball Reference

Teams
- As a player: Samsung Lions (2004, 2007–2020)

- Yun Sung-hwan
- Hangul: 윤성환
- Hanja: 尹盛桓
- RR: Yun Seonghwan
- MR: Yun Sŏnghwan

Yun Sung-hwan (Korean: 윤성환; born October 8, 1981, in Busan, South Korea) was a starting pitcher for the Samsung Lions of the KBO League. His nickname is Yun Taeja (Crown Prince Yun), for being the best pitcher that Sun Dong-yol has trained.

== Amateur career ==
Upon graduation from Busan Commerce High School in 2000, Yun started his collegiate career at Dong-eui University in Busan. He led his team to two consecutive gold medals in the baseball tournament at the Korean National Sports Festival in 2000 and 2001. He also helped his team to win their first national baseball championship as a starter and closer in 2002.

== Professional career ==
Yun was selected by the Samsung Lions in the 2nd round (8th pick, 15th overall) of the 2004 KBO Draft. Yun wanted to join the Lotte Giants, the team from his hometown, however, head coach Sun Dong-yol, currently the manager of Samsung Lions saw great potential in Yun and scouted him.

=== 2009 ===
On July 30, 2009, Yun pitched the whole game for the first time in his pro career against the LG Twins. He won against all 7 teams on August 5 and became the ace of the Samsung Lions.

Yun ranked first among KBO pitchers in total victories with 14 wins in 2009.

=== 2015 ===
After the 2014 season, he broke the record for the best FA contract ever with a four-year, eight billion won contract (4.8 billion won, annual salary 800 million won).
