= Choi Dong-won =

South Korean baseball player (1958–2011)

- Pitcher
- Born: May 24, 1958; Busan, South Korea
- Died: September 14, 2011 (aged 53); Goyang, Gyeonggi-do, South Korea
- Batted: Right Threw: Right

KBO debut
- April 3, 1983, for the Lotte Giants

Last KBO appearance
- 1990, for the Samsung Lions

KBO statistics
- Win–loss: 103–74
- Saves: 26
- Earned Run Average: 2.46
- Strikeouts: 1019
- Stats at Baseball Reference

Teams
- As player: Lotte Giants (1983–1988); Samsung Lions (1989–1990); As coach: Hanwha Eagles (2001, 2005–2008)

Career highlights and awards
- Became the only pitcher to earn 4 wins in a Korean Series in KBO history (1984); Single-season KBO strikeout holder with 223 (1984); KBO MVP (1984); KBO Golden Glove Award winner (1984); Korean Series champion (1984)
Medals
Representing South Korea
Men's baseball
Baseball World Cup
Gold medal – first place	1982 Seoul	Team
Silver medal – second place	1980 Tokyo	Team
Bronze medal – third place	1978 Rome	Team
Intercontinental Cup
Gold medal – first place	1977 Managua	Team

- Choi Dong-won
- Hangul: 최동원
- Hanja: 崔東原
- RR: Choe Dongwon
- MR: Ch'oe Tongwŏn

Choi Dong-won (Korean: 최동원; May 24, 1958 – September 14, 2011) was a South Korean professional baseball pitcher and coach who played for the Lotte Giants and Samsung Lions in the KBO League. Nicknamed "Iron Arm" (Korean: 무쇠팔), Choi is widely considered as one of the greatest Korean pitchers of all time.

== Early life and amateur career ==
Choi was born on May 24, 1958 in Namhae County, South Gyeongsang Province, South Korea. After moving to Busan with his family, Choi attended Gyeongnam High School and played for the school's baseball team. During his high school career, Choi gained national attention at the Champions Invitational Tournament in 1975 when he threw a complete game no-hitter against the defending national champion Kyungbuk High School and took another no-hitter into the ninth inning in his next game before it was broken up by an infield single.

In 1976, he led his team to win the prestigious Blue Dragon Flag National Championship, setting a high-school record for most strikeouts in a major-tournament game with 20 in the semifinal and earning 4 out of the team's 5 wins. In September 1976, Choi was selected for the South Korean junior national team and competed in a 3–game friendly series against Japan where he hurled a one-run complete game victory in the first game, and racked up another victory the following day, coming up on relief in the third inning and throwing seven innings of one-run ball.

Upon graduation from high school, Choi entered Yonsei University and played college baseball from 1977 to 1980. In November 1977, Choi was first called up to the South Korea senior baseball team and played an important role in the team's first world championship at the 1977 Intercontinental Cup held in Nicaragua.

After graduating from Yonsei University in 1981, Choi signed with the amateur company team of Lotte Corporation. In August 1981, Choi competed for South Korea in the 1981 Intercontinental Cup where he posted a 2–0 record and an ERA of 1.32. Choi took a perfect game with 11 strikeouts into the bottom of the ninth inning against Canada in the round-robin phase before giving up a single. However, he was eventually named the tourney's Best Pitcher.

== Professional career ==
=== Toronto Blue Jays ===
After the impressive performances at the 1981 Intercontinental Cup in Canada, the Toronto Blue Jays of Major League Baseball showed a strong interest in Choi, regarding him as having the potential to play as a starter immediately.

The Blue Jays' scouts went to see Choi six times before signing him to a major league contract reportedly worth around $250,000. Meanwhile, South Korea was in the process of forming its own professional baseball league, the KBO League. When the Korean government discovered that Choi was planning on heading to Toronto, it threatened to jail the scouts if they tried to leave the country with the contract. The Blue Jays then planned on bringing him to their spring training for the 1983 season, but the government intervened again. Choi was given the option to first serve in the military before being allowed to leave for Toronto, or to continue his career in South Korea and being waived for the draft. He eventually opted for the latter, and he declared for the 1983 KBO Draft.

=== Lotte Giants ===
Choi was selected by the Lotte Giants in the first round of the 1983 KBO Draft. In his rookie season, he posted a respectable 9–16 record and an ERA of 2.89 with 148 strikeouts, while throwing 9 complete games and one shutout.

Choi established himself in 1984 with a breakout season for the Giants. He had a record of 27–13 and fanned a league-leading 223 batters during the season. Choi also lowered his ERA to 2.40, and posted the second-highest innings pitched total in a season in KBO history with 284.2. In the 1984 Korean Series, the Giants beat the Samsung Lions in seven games. Choi started for the Giants four times and threw four complete-games with a 3–1 record as a starter, with his final outing being in Game 7. Choi accumulated one more win as a long reliever in Game 6, coming up on relief in the fifth inning and hurling five shutout innings with six strikeouts. He still holds the records for the most wins (4) and most innings pitched (40.0) in a single championship series.

The 1986 season ended as one of the finest he had ever posted. He held a 19-14 record and an ERA of 1.55 with 208 strikeouts in 267 innings pitched. Choi pitched a career-high 17 complete games and his 1.55 ERA was the lowest of his eight-season career. He led the league in innings pitched, and was runner-up in wins, ERA and strikeouts (208).

On May 16, 1987, in a game against the Haitai Tigers, Choi completed a game of no-decision through 15 innings - throwing 209 pitches in total. The opposing pitcher Sun Dong-yol, also regarded as one of the finest in the league, also completed the game, ending up pitching 232 pitches. This matchup of the two Korean ace pitchers is often considered as one of the best moments in Korean baseball history.

=== Samsung Lions ===
Prior to the 1989 season, Choi was traded with Kim Yong-chul to the Samsung Lions for Jang Hyo-jo and Kim Si-jin. After the trade, his career quickly spiraled downward. His statistics did not improve while with the Lions. In just over two years with the Lions, he posted a 7–7 record with an ERA of 4.50.

Choi became the first KBO member of the 1,000 strikeout club on May 20, 1990 versus the LG Twins. However, after the 1990 season, Choi announced his retirement from baseball as a player.

== Post-playing career ==
Following his retirement, Choi briefly entered politics. He then left South Korea to study baseball in New York City, working in baseball broadcasting and acting after he came back to Korea two years later. He later returned to baseball as the minor league manager for the Hanwha Eagles and as a supervisor for the KBO.

== Death and memorial ==
Choi Dong-Won's number 11 was retired by the Lotte Giants in 2011.

Choi died of colon cancer at a hospital in Goyang, Gyeonggi-do on September 14, 2011, aged 53. Choi was survived by his wife, one son, mother and two younger brothers.

The Lotte Giants retired Choi's number 11 in a ceremony on September 30, 2011. The number was the club's first-ever retired number in its history. He was portrayed by Cho Seung-woo in the 2011 film, Perfect Game, which dramatizes the rivalry between him and Haitai Tigers pitcher Sun Dong-yol during the 1980s.
