= Jang Hyo-jo =

South Korean baseball player (1956–2011)

Jang Hyo-Jo
- Right fielder
- Born: July 6, 1956; Busan, South Korea
- Died: September 7, 2011 (aged 55); Busan, South Korea
- Batted: Left Threw: Left

KBO debut
- 1983, for the Samsung Lions

Last KBO appearance
- 1992, for the Lotte Giants

KBO statistics
- Batting average: .331
- Home runs: 54
- RBI: 437
- Hits: 1009
- Stats at Baseball Reference

Teams
- Samsung Lions (1983–1988); Lotte Giants (1989–1992)

Career highlights and awards
- KBO MVP (1987); 5× KBO League Golden Glove Award winner (1983, 1984, 1985, 1986, 1987); .331 career batting average (highest ever); Won 4 batting titles, including 3 in a row (1985–1987).; 2x KBO League champion (1985, 1992)
Medals
Representing South Korea
Men's baseball
Baseball World Cup
Gold medal – first place	1982 Seoul	Team
Intercontinental Cup
Gold medal – first place	1977 Managua	Team

Jang Hyo-Jo (Korean: 장효조; Hanja: 張孝祚; July 6, 1956 – September 7, 2011) was a South Korean professional baseball outfielder. He played in the KBO League for the Samsung Lions and Lotte Giants. Jang batted and threw left-handed.

Jang is widely regarded as one of the best KBO hitters for average of all time. He still holds several records as of 2011, including the highest career batting average (.331) and most career batting titles with four.

== Playing career ==
Jang played college baseball at Hanyang University in Seoul. Upon graduation from Hanyang University in February 1979, he joined the POSCO baseball club in the Korean amateur league. In September 1982, Jang competed in the 1982 Amateur World Series as a member of the South Korean national baseball team and helped his team to win its first world championship as a starting right fielder. After the competition, Jang announced his interest to join the KBO Draft, and he was eventually drafted by the Samsung Lions in the third round of the 1983 KBO Draft.

In his first pro season (1983), Jang won the batting title with a .369 batting average, being the first KBO player to win the batting title as a rookie. He posted career-highs in home runs (18) and stolen bases (25) as well. However, he lost the KBO League Rookie of the Year Award to Park Jong-hoon of the OB Bears, which has been considered one of the most controversial KBO elections of all time.

In 1985, Jang won his second batting title with a .373 batting average and led the Lions to their first KBO championship. He won his third batting championship with a .329 average in 1986 and won his fourth title with a career-best .387 batting average in 1987. He is the only player to win three straight batting titles in the KBO.

After the 1988 season, Jang was traded with Kim Si-Jin to the Lotte Giants for Choi Dong-Won and Kim Yong-chul.

In 1991, Jang was runner-up in batting average with .347 and first in on-base percentage with .452. In 1992, his last pro season, Jang earned his first Korean Series ring but he dipped down to batting a career-low .265, with 0 home runs and 25 runs batted in. After the 1992 season with the Giants, Jang announced his retirement.

In a ten-season career, Jang batted .331 with 78 home runs and 437 RBI in 961 games and ended with a .430 on-base percentage. He had 1009 career hits in 3050 at-bats. Jang also topped the KBO in on-base percentage in six seasons and won five straight Golden Gloves from 1983 to 1987 for defensive excellence.

== Coaching career ==
Following his playing career, Jang coached for the Lotte Giants in 1994 and the Samsung Lions in 2000.

Jang was named manager of the Lions' second-tier team in 2010.

== Death ==
Jang died of liver cancer at a hospital in Busan on September 7, 2011.
