= Bae Young-soo =

South Korean baseball player (born 1981)

Bae Young-Soo
- Starting pitcher
- Born: May 4, 1981 (age 44)
- Batted: Right Threw: Right

KBO debut
- April 9, 2000, for the Samsung Lions

Last KBO appearance
- 2019, for the Doosan Bears

KBO statistics
- Win–loss record: 138-122
- Earned run average: 4.46
- Strikeouts: 1,436
- Stats at Baseball Reference

Teams
- Samsung Lions (2000–2014); Hanwha Eagles (2015–2018); Doosan Bears (2019)

Career highlights and awards
- 2004 KBO MVP; 2004 KBO League Golden Glove Award winner; 7× Korean Series champion (2002, 2005, 2006, 2011, 2012, 2013, 2014, 2019)
Medals
Men's baseball
World Baseball Classic
Bronze medal – third place	2006 San Diego	Team

Bae Young-Soo (Korean: 배영수; Hanja: 裵英洙; born May 4, 1981, in Daegu, South Korea) is a former South Korean starting pitcher

== See also ==
- List of KBO career win leaders
- List of KBO career strikeout leaders
