= Perfect Game (2011 film) =

2011 South Korean baseball film

- Film poster
- Hangul: 퍼펙트 게임
- RR: Peopekteu geim
- MR: P'ŏp'ekt'ŭ keim
- Directed by: Park Hee-gon
- Written by: Park Hee-gon
- Produced by: Lee Ho-seong; Kim Seong-tae; Jang Won-seok; Choi Nak-kwon
- Starring: Cho Seung-woo; Yang Dong-geun
- Cinematography: Choi Sang-ho
- Edited by: Kim Chang-ju
- Music by: Kim Tae-seong
- Distributed by: Lotte Entertainment
- Release date: December 21, 2011
- Running time: 127 minutes
- Country: South Korea
- Language: Korean
- Box office: US$10 million

Perfect Game (Korean: 퍼펙트 게임) is a 2011 South Korean biographical sports drama film based on the true story of rivals Sun Dong-yeol of the Haitai Tigers and Choi Dong-won of the Lotte Giants, the top pitchers in the Korea Baseball Organization league during the 1980s. The rivalry between the two was further heated up by regionalism at the time with Sun representing the Jeolla Province and Choi, the Gyeongsang Province.

The sports movie revisits one of the most exciting matches in Korean baseball history on May 16, 1987, which would be the last time the two stars would face each other, and ended in a 15-inning draw, although neither actually pitched a perfect game. It stars Cho Seung-woo as Choi and Yang Dong-geun as Sun.

== Cast ==
- Cho Seung-woo - Choi Dong-won
- Yang Dong-geun - Sun Dong-yol
- Choi Jung-won - Sports writer Seo-hyung
- Juni - Min-kyung
- Cho Jin-woong - Kim Yong-chul
- Ma Dong-seok - Park Man-soo
- Lee Do-kyeong - Coach Sung Ki-young
- Lee Hae-woo - Kang Hyun-soo
- Jo Chan-hyung - Han Moon-yeon
- Son Byong-ho - Kim Eung-ryong
- Kim Young-min - Kang Sung-tae
- Lee Seon-jin - Man-soo's wife
- Kong Jeong-hwan - Yoo Doo-yeol
- Cha Hyeon-woo - Jang Chae-geun
- Kim Dong-hee - Jung Young-ki
- Park Seo-joon - Chil-goo
- Dan Asenlund - Canadian play-by-play commentator
- Lasse Lindh - Canadian color commentator
- Choi Il-hwa - Hyun-soo's father (cameo)
- Kim Byeong-ok - Chief secretary (cameo)
- Lee Byung-joon - Department head Choi (cameo)
- Oh Jung-se - Sports commentator (cameo)
- Choi Won-young - Sportscaster (cameo)
- Jang Kyeong-ah - Reporter (cameo)
- Go Se-won - Jae-suk (cameo)
- Yeo Ho-min - (cameo)
- Lee Si-eon - Member of the national team / MBC Baseball player (cameo)
- Song Sam-dong - Senior (cameo)
- Tae In-ho

== See also ==
- Baseball in South Korea
- Glove (film)
- YMCA Baseball Team
