= Lee Seung-yuop =

South Korean baseball player (born 1976)

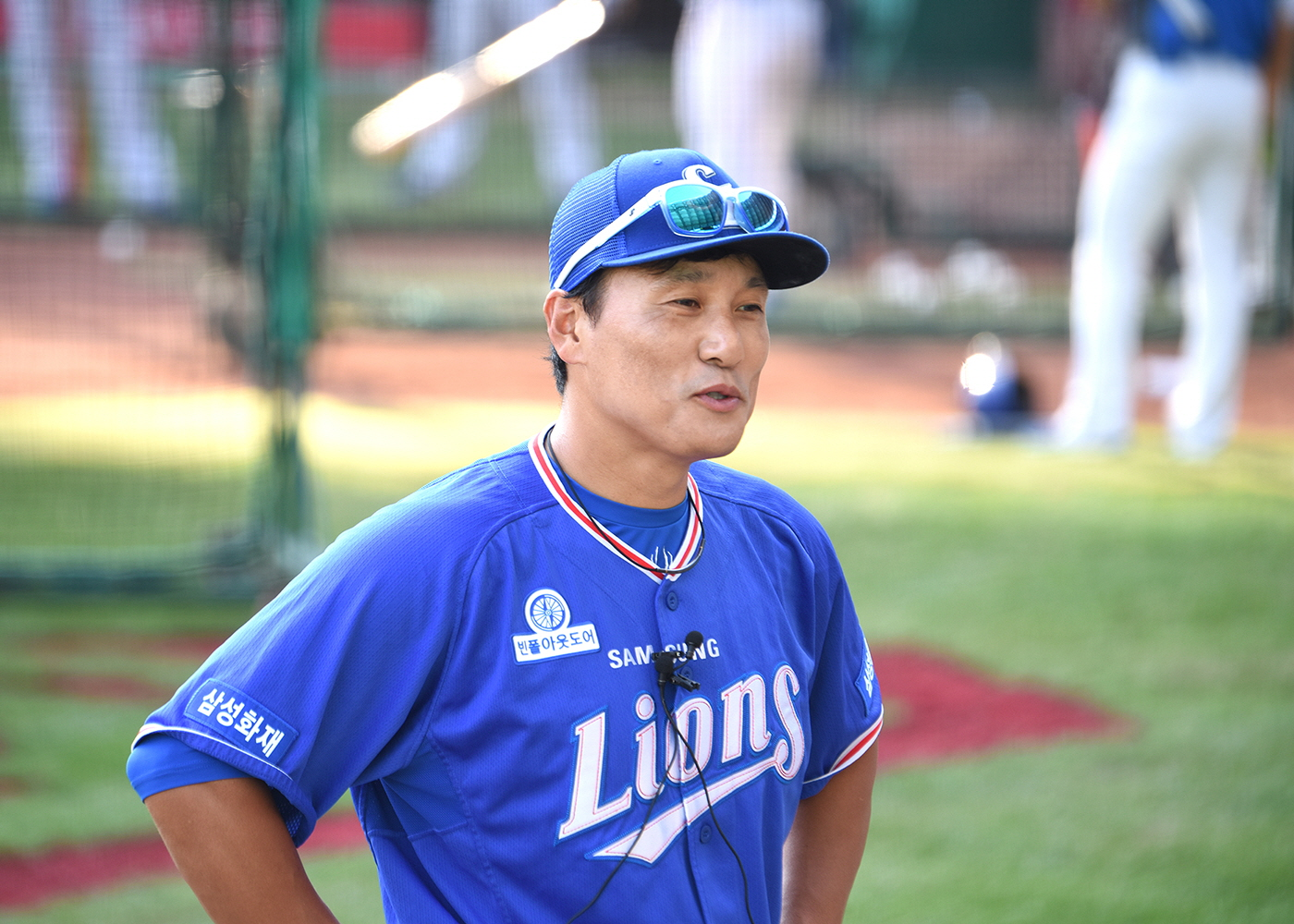
- Lee with the Samsung Lions in 2017

Yomiuri Giants
- First baseman / Manager / Coach
- Born: 18 August 1976 (age 49); Daegu, South Korea
- Batted: Left Threw: Left

Professional debut
- KBO: April 15, 1995, for the Samsung Lions
- NPB: March 27, 2004, for the Chiba Lotte Marines

Last appearance
- KBO: October 3, 2017, for the Samsung Lions
- NPB: October 18, 2011, for the Orix Buffaloes

KBO statistics
- Batting average: .302
- Hits: 2,156
- Home runs: 467
- Runs batted in: 1,498

NPB statistics
- Batting average: .257
- Hits: 686
- Home runs: 159
- Runs batted in: 439
- Stats at Baseball Reference

Teams
- As player: Samsung Lions (1995–2003); Chiba Lotte Marines (2004–2005); Yomiuri Giants (2006–2010); Orix Buffaloes (2011); Samsung Lions (2012–2017); As manager: Doosan Bears (2022–2025); As coach: Yomiuri Giants (2026–present)

Career highlights and awards
- KBO: 5× KBO MVP (1997, 1999, 2001–2003); 10× KBO Golden Glove (1997–2003, 2012, 2014–2015); 11× KBO All-Star (1997–2003, 2013, 2015–2017); 5× KBO home run leader (1997, 1999, 2001–2003); 4× KBO RBI leader (1997, 1999, 2002–2003); KBO career home run leader; 4× Korean Series champion (2002, 2012–2014); Korean Series MVP (2012); NPB: 2× All-Star (2005-2006); 2× Japan Series champion (2005, 2009); International: All-World Baseball Classic Team (2006)
Medals
Men's baseball
Representing South Korea
Olympic Games
Gold medal – first place	2008 Beijing	Team
Bronze medal – third place	2000 Sydney	Team
World Baseball Classic
Bronze medal – third place	2006 San Diego	Team
Asian Games
Gold medal – first place	2002 Busan	Team

- Lee Seung-yuop
- Hangul: 이승엽
- Hanja: 李承燁
- RR: I Seungyeop
- MR: I Sŭngyŏp

Lee Seung-yuop (born 18 August 1976) is a South Korean former professional baseball first baseman who currently serves as a co-hitting coach for the Yomiuri Giants of Nippon Professional Baseball (NPB). He played in the KBO League for the Samsung Lions, and in NPB for the Chiba Lotte Marines, Yomiuri Giants, and Orix Buffaloes.

At the age of 26, he became the youngest professional baseball player in the world to hit 300 career home runs. He formerly held the Asian home run record of 56 homers in a season, established in 2003 while playing for Samsung in the KBO. (The record was broken by Wladimir Balentien of the Tokyo Yakult Swallows, on September 15, 2013, when he hit his 56th and 57th home runs of the season against the Hanshin Tigers. Lee holds the KBO records for career runs scored, RBI, total bases, and slugging percentage. Combined, across the KBO and NPB, Lee has also recorded more hits than any other native-born South Korean player.

== Education ==
Lee graduated from Kyeongbuk High School.

== Professional career ==
Lee started his career with the Samsung Lions of the KBO League in 1995 and played with them for nine seasons. He was the first player in the KBO League to hit 50 home runs in a season when he clubbed 54 in 1999. He set the single-season home run mark with 56 in 2003.

In 2004 Lee signed with the Chiba Lotte Marines of Japan's Pacific League for two years. He signed a one-year contract with the Yomiuri Giants for 210 million yen, including a 50 million yen signing bonus, for the 2006 season. He batted fourth and played first base there. He explicitly showed interest in making a move to Major League Baseball.

He had a slow start in Japan. Lee hit just 14 home runs and drove in 50 runs while batting .240 in 100 games. In the next season, he greatly improved, making 30 home runs and 82 RBI while batting .260 in 117 games.

He was selected to play for the South Korea national baseball team in the inaugural World Baseball Classic in 2006. He batted .333 and led all players in the tournament with 5 home runs and 10 RBI. This has increased speculation that an MLB team might eventually sign him. However, Lee was under contract to play with the Yomiuri Giants for the 2006 season.

On 1 August 2006, Lee became only the third professional baseball player to hit 400 career home runs before the age of 30 (others include Sadaharu Oh and Alex Rodriguez). In the 2006 season, he batted .323 with 41 homers.

On 3 August 2006, a report on MLB Radio on XM satellite radio stated that the New York Yankees and Lee had agreed to start negotiations during the offseason after the 2006 regular season. The South Korean daily Chosun Ilbo had reported on July 19 that the Yankees had expressed interest in the slugger.

After the conclusion of the 2006 season, Lee re-signed with the Yomiuri Giants, citing that he wishes to win a Japan Series with the team. However, a clause allowed him to be a free agent if the Giants won the series.

After being released by the Giants at the end of the 2010 season, Lee joined the Orix Buffaloes of Japan's Pacific League in December 2010.

On 5 December 2011, Lee rejoined his former team Samsung Lions, signing a one-year deal.

He played with the Lions until his retirement at age 41 at the end of the 2017 season. Despite his age, Lee hit 143 home runs between 2012 and 2017. In his retirement game against the Nexen Heroes in October 2017, he hit two home runs.

== Coaching career ==
=== Doosan Bears ===
Beginning in 2022, Lee served as the manager of the Doosan Bears, Lee has two playoff appearances. In 2022, Lee lead the Bears to their first wild card game under his reign against the NC Dinos where they were eliminated from playoff contention after losing their first game. Lee then continued to the playoffs in 2024 where he lost against the KT Wiz that ended their season. He voluntarily resigned from the Bears on June 2, 2025, in the year of his contract expiration.

=== Yomiuri Giants ===
On November 27, 2025, the Yomiuri Giants of Nippon Professional Baseball hired Lee to serve as a co-hitting coach alongside Zelous Wheeler.

== 2008 Summer Olympics ==
Lee played for the South Korean national team in the 2008 Summer Olympic Games in Beijing. Slowed down by an injury to his left thumb, Lee struggled in the preliminary rounds, limited to 3-for-22 (.136) with two runs batted in and no home runs, before coming alive in the medal round games against Japan and Cuba.

In the semifinal game against Japan, Lee hit a go-ahead two-run home run in the bottom of the eighth inning off reliever Hitoki Iwase, which proved to be the winning runs in Korea's 6–2 win.

In the gold medal game against Cuba, Lee hit a two-run home run in the first inning off Cuban starter Norberto González to help Korea defeat Cuba and win the gold medal.

== Career statistics ==
=== Career statistics in KBO League ===
Season	Team	G	AB	R	H	2B	3B	HR	RBI	SB	SF	BB	HBP	K	GIDP	E	AVG	SLG	OBP	OPS
1995	Samsung	121	365	55	104	29	1	13	73	0	9	33	4	54	4	8	.285	.477	.345	.822
1996	Samsung	122	459	57	139	32	6	9	76	4	6	34	5	42	10	5	.303	.458	.354	.812
1997	Samsung	126	517	96	170	37	3	32	114	5	5	49	6	79	10	4	.329	.598	.391	.989
1998	Samsung	126	477	100	146	32	2	38	102	0	8	78	5	97	4	3	.306	.621	.404	1.025
1999	Samsung	132	486	128	157	33	2	54	123	10	4	112	12	114	7	0	.323	.733	.458	1.191
2000	Samsung	125	454	108	133	33	0	36	95	4	3	80	7	113	5	2	.293	.604	.404	1.008
2001	Samsung	127	463	101	128	31	2	39	95	4	3	96	12	130	6	4	.276	.605	.412	1.017
2002	Samsung	133	511	123	165	42	2	47	126	1	2	89	15	109	11	4	.323	.689	.436	1.125
2003	Samsung	131	479	115	144	23	0	56	144	7	6	101	10	89	11	5	.301	.699	.428	1.127
2012	Samsung	126	488	84	150	28	2	21	85	6	6	59	4	101	10	4	.307	.502	.384	.886
2013	Samsung	111	443	62	112	24	8	13	69	3	8	30	2	94	8	0	.253	.395	.298	.693
2014	Samsung	127	506	83	156	30	0	32	101	5	2	40	0	77	10	0	.308	.557	.358	.915
2015	Samsung	122	470	87	156	28	1	26	90	2	6	40	6	71	10	0	.332	.562	.387	.949
2016	Samsung	142	542	91	164	32	2	27	118	5	8	65	8	89	7	0	.303	.518	.380	.899
2017	Samsung	135	472	65	132	30	5	24	87	1	8	47	6	85	7	2	.280	.517	.347	.864
Total		1906	7132	1355	2156	464	28	467	1498	34	76	953	102	1344	120	39	.302	.572	.389	.960

=== Career statistics in NPB ===
Season	Team	G	AB	R	H	2B	3B	HR	RBI	SB	SF	BB	HBP	K	GIDP	E	AVG	OBP	SLG	OPS
2004	Lotte	100	333	50	80	20	4	14	50	1	3	42	3	88	6	4	0.240	0.328	0.450	0.779
2005	Lotte	117	408	64	106	25	2	30	82	5	3	33	1	79	9	2	0.260	0.315	0.551	0.886
2006	Yomiuri	143	524	101	169	30	0	41	108	5	7	56	5	126	5	3	0.323	0.389	0.616	1.003
2007	Yomiuri	137	541	84	148	29	2	30	74	4	1	38	1	119	8	5	0.274	0.322	0.501	0.823
2008	Yomiuri	45	153	21	38	4	0	8	27	1	0	11	6	37	3	0	0.248	0.324	0.431	0.755
2009	Yomiuri	77	223	33	51	9	0	16	36	1	1	28	5	65	1	3	0.229	0.327	0.484	0.811
2010	Yomiuri	56	92	13	15	1	0	5	11	1	0	12	3	26	0	2	0.163	0.280	0.337	0.617
2011	Orix	122	394	28	79	20	0	15	51	0	6	32	0	121	8	4	0.201	0.257	0.365	0.622
Total		797	2668	394	686	138	8	159	439	18	21	252	24	661	40	23	0.257	0.324	0.494	0.818

== Filmography ==
=== Television shows ===
Year	Title	Role	Notes	Ref.
2021–2022	Golf Battle: Birdie Buddies	Cast Member	Season 1–4	
2022	Strongest Baseball	Cast Member		

== Awards and nominations ==
Name of the award ceremony, year presented, category, nominee of the award, and the result of the nomination
Award ceremony	Year	Category	Nominee / Work	Result	Ref.
Blue Dragon Series Awards	2022	Best New Male Entertainer	Golf Battle: Birdie Buddies	Nominated	
SBS Entertainment Awards	2021	Rookie Award in Show and Sports	Golf Battle: Birdie Buddies	Won	

== See also ==
- List of KBO career home run leaders
- List of KBO career RBI leaders
