= Pohang Baseball Stadium =

Baseball stadium in Pohang, South Korea

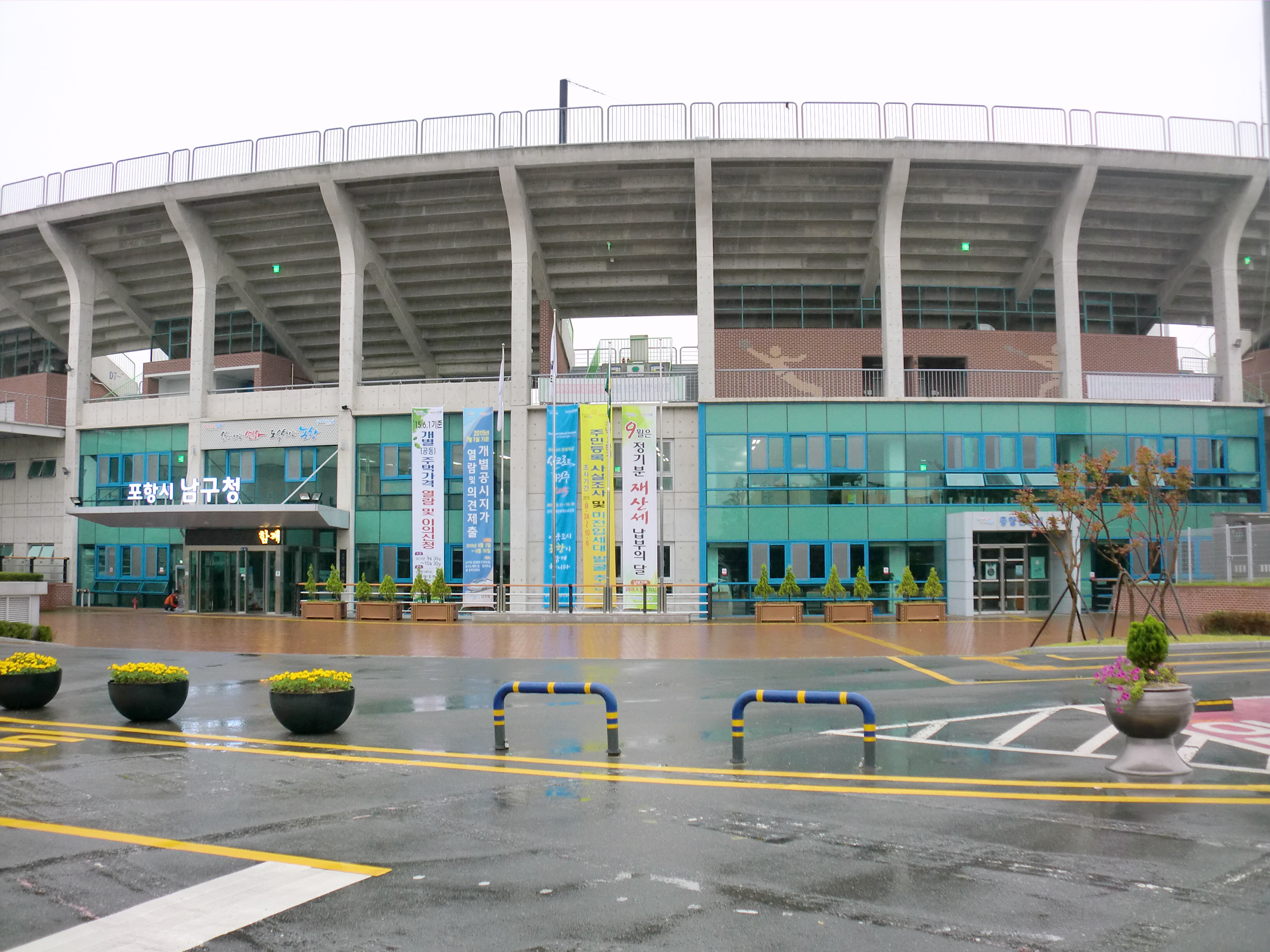
- Interactive map of Pohang Baseball Stadium
- Location: Daedo-dong, Nam-gu, Pohang, South Korea
- Coordinates: 36.007778°N 129.359444°E
- Owner: City of Pohang
- Operator: Samsung Lions
- Capacity: 12,000
- Surface: Artificial turf
- Field size: Left Field – 99 metres (325 ft); Center Field – 122 metres (400 ft); Right Field – 99 metres (325 ft); Outfield Wall Height – 3 metres (10 ft)

Construction
- Groundbreaking: 3 March 2010
- Opened: August 14, 2012
- Cost: 32 billion won

Tenant
- Samsung Lions (KBO) (2012–present)

Pohang Baseball Stadium is a baseball stadium in Pohang, South Korea. The stadium is currently being used as a second home of the KBO League team Samsung Lions.
