= KBO League Most Valuable Player Award =

Korean basketball award

KBO League Most Valuable Player Award (MVP)
- Sport: Baseball
- League: KBO League
- Awarded for: Regular season most valuable player of KBO League
- Country: Korea

History
- First award: 1982
- Most wins: Lee Seung-yuop (5)
- Most recent: Cody Ponce

The KBO League Most Valuable Player Award is given to the player judged the most valuable player in the Korea Baseball Organization (KBO) League. The most recent winner is Cody Ponce of the Hanwha Eagles.

== Award winners ==
Year	Player	Team	Position	Ref
1982	Park Chul-soon	OB Bears	Pitcher	
1983	Lee Man-soo	Samsung Lions	Catcher	
1984	Choi Dong-won	Lotte Giants	Pitcher	
1985	Kim Seong-han	Haitai Tigers	Infielder	
1986	Sun Dong-yol	Haitai Tigers	Pitcher	
1987	Jang Hyo-jo	Samsung Lions	Outfielder	
1988	Kim Seong-han (2)	Haitai Tigers	Infielder	
1989	Sun Dong-yol (2)	Haitai Tigers	Pitcher	
1990	Sun Dong-yol (3)	Haitai Tigers	Pitcher	
1991	Chang Jong-hoon	Binggrae Eagles	Infielder	
1992	Chang Jong-hoon (2)	Binggrae Eagles	Infielder	
1993	Kim Seong-rae	Samsung Lions	Infielder	
1994	Lee Jong-beom	Haitai Tigers	Infielder	
1995	Kim Sang-ho	OB Bears	Outfielder	
1996	Koo Dae-sung	Hanwha Eagles	Pitcher	
1997	Lee Seung-yeop	Samsung Lions	Infielder	
1998	Tyrone Woods	OB Bears	Infielder	
1999	Lee Seung-yeop (2)	Samsung Lions	Infielder	
2000	Park Kyung-oan	Hyundai Unicorns	Catcher	
2001	Lee Seung-yeop (3)	Samsung Lions	Infielder	
2002	Lee Seung-yuop (4)	Samsung Lions	Infielder	
2003	Lee Seung-yeop (5)	Samsung Lions	Infielder	
2004	Bae Young-soo	Samsung Lions	Pitcher	
2005	Son Min-han	Lotte Giants	Pitcher	
2006	Ryu Hyun-jin	Hanwha Eagles	Pitcher	
2007	Danny Rios	Doosan Bears	Pitcher	
2008	Kim Kwang-hyun	SK Wyverns	Pitcher	
2009	Kim Sang-hyeon	Kia Tigers	Infielder	
2010	Lee Dae-ho	Lotte Giants	Infielder	
2011	Yoon Suk-min	Kia Tigers	Pitcher	
2012	Park Byung-ho	Nexen Heroes	Infielder	
2013	Park Byung-ho (2)	Nexen Heroes	Infielder	
2014	Seo Geon-chang	Nexen Heroes	Infielder	
2015	Eric Thames	NC Dinos	Infielder	
2016	Dustin Nippert	Doosan Bears	Pitcher	
2017	Yang Hyeon-jong	Kia Tigers	Pitcher	
2018	Kim Jae-hwan	Doosan Bears	Outfielder	
2019	Josh Lindblom	Doosan Bears	Pitcher	
2020	Mel Rojas Jr.	KT Wiz	Outfielder	
2021	Ariel Miranda	Doosan Bears	Pitcher	
2022	Lee Jung-hoo	Kiwoom Heroes	Outfielder	
2023	Erick Fedde	NC Dinos	Pitcher	
2024	Kim Do-yeong	Kia Tigers	Infielder	
2025	Cody Ponce	Hanwha Eagles	Pitcher	
2026				
