= Triple Crown (baseball) =

Baseball achievement

In baseball, a player earns a Triple Crown when they lead a league in three specific statistical categories in the same season. The term "Triple Crown" generally refers to the batting achievement of leading a league in batting average, home runs, and runs batted in (RBI) over the same season. The term "Pitching Triple Crown" refers to the pitching achievement of leading a league in wins, strikeouts, and earned run average (ERA).

The term "Triple Crown" is typically used when a player leads one league, such as the American League (AL) or the National League (NL), in the specified categories. A tie for a lead in any category, such as home runs, is sufficient to be considered the leader in that category. A "Major League Triple Crown" may be said to occur when a player leads all of Major League Baseball in all three categories.

== Hitting Triple Crown ==
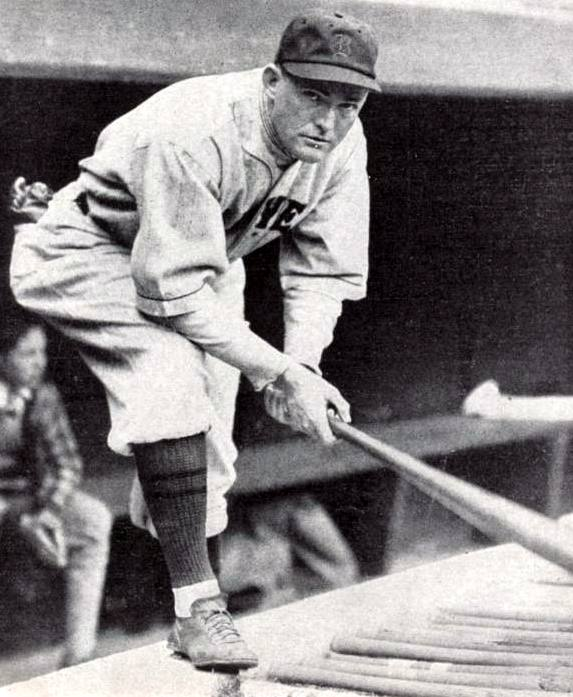
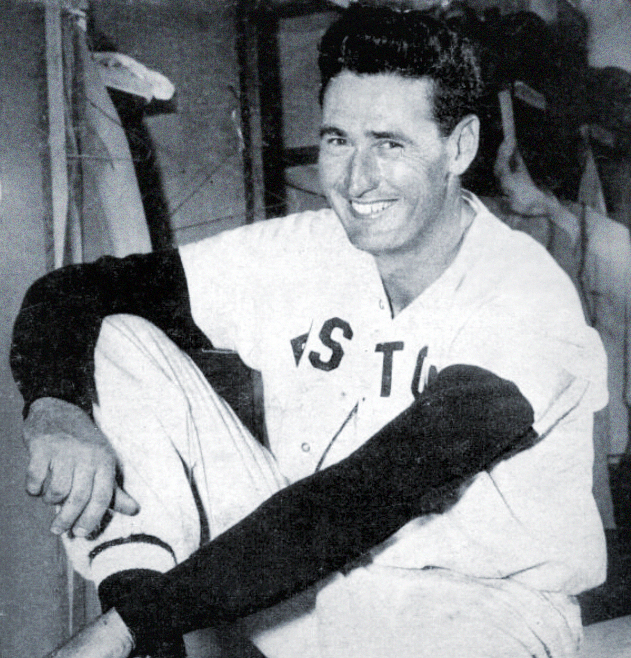
Rogers Hornsby (left) and Ted Williams (right) are the only MLB batters to have won the Triple Crown twice. Hornsby achieved this in 1922 and 1925, while Williams accomplished this in 1942 and 1947.

The term "Triple Crown", unless modified, generally connotes the batting achievement; it is not necessary to refer to it as the "hitting" Triple Crown. A hitter who completes a season leading a league in batting average, home runs, and runs batted in (RBI) may be said to have won the "Triple Crown."

The Triple Crown reflects the ability of a hitter to excel in three important ways: to hit safely a high percentage of the time (batting average); to hit the ball long distances (home runs); and to produce when runners are on base, driving them home to score (RBI). It is an uncommon feat to lead all hitters in each of these categories. It has been accomplished 17 times in major league seasons, most recently in 2012 by Miguel Cabrera. Cabrera's was the first since 1967, when Carl Yastrzemski accomplished the feat. Yastrzemski won the Triple Crown the year after Frank Robinson did, the only time back-to-back Triple Crowns occurred in baseball history.

Hiromitsu Ochiai and Oscar Charleston are the only players to have won three batting Triple Crowns in any league. Ochiai won in 1982, 1985, and 1986 while competing in the Pacific League of Nippon Professional Baseball. Charleston won in 1921 while playing in the Negro National League, and again in 1924 and 1925 while playing in the Eastern Colored League. In the American League and National League, the most batting Triple Crowns won by a player is two. Rogers Hornsby was the first to accomplish it, winning his first in 1922 and then leading both leagues in 1925 en route to his second Triple Crown, both with the St. Louis Cardinals. Ted Williams later matched this mark, leading both leagues in 1942 and the American League in 1947, and narrowly missing a third in 1949, all with the Boston Red Sox. Ochiai and Randy Bass each recorded Triple Crowns in consecutive seasons in the Nippon League, in 1985 and 1986.

The Cardinals have won the most hitting Triple Crowns as a franchise with four. Along with Hornsby's two, Tip O'Neill won in the now-defunct American Association in 1887 while the team was known as the St. Louis Browns, and Joe Medwick added the Cardinals' fourth in 1937. Eleven of the thirteen eligible players who have batting Triple Crowns have been elected to the Hall of Fame. Baseball journalist Tim Kurkjian believes the Triple Crown has become more difficult to win with the advent of more hitters who choose to specialize in either hitting for batting average or power.

== Pitching Triple Crown ==
Sandy Koufax won three Major League pitching Triple Crowns, two consecutively and all three within four seasons.

A pitcher who leads the league in wins, strikeouts, and earned run average (ERA) is said to have won the "Pitching Triple Crown." The term was previously defined as leading the league in wins, ERA, and winning percentage. It was used in that older sense to describe the unsuccessful pursuits of that goal by Bobby Shantz in 1952 and Johnny Antonelli in 1954 as well as Sandy Koufax in 1963. Koufax was first described as having won the Pitching Triple Crown in the current sense after his 1965 season, though the older sense continued to be used.

In contrast to the respective batting statistics, the Pitching Triple Crown statistics are more or less complementary (for example, a pitcher who is especially proficient at striking out batters is likely to give up fewer earned runs, and consequently more likely to win games); therefore, the accomplishment is not as rare as the batting crown.

The Pitching Triple Crown has been accomplished 39 times in the American and National Leagues. The most by one player is three, accomplished by three players. Grover Cleveland Alexander captured his first two in consecutive seasons with the Philadelphia Phillies (1915–1916), and won a third in 1920 with the Chicago Cubs. Alexander is the only pitcher to win a Pitching Triple Crown with more than one major league team. Walter Johnson won his three Triple Crowns with the original Washington Senators, leading the league in all three categories in 1913, 1918, and 1924. Sandy Koufax was the most recent to capture three Triple Crowns, winning his three within four seasons for the Los Angeles Dodgers (1963, 1965–1966); all of Koufax's crowns led both major leagues, the most for any player.

Outside MLB, Yoshinobu Yamamoto and Sun Dong-yol each won three pitching triple crowns and are the only players to earn this achievement in three consecutive seasons. Yamamoto achieved this record in the NPB from 2021 to 2023, and Sun Dong-yol achieved it in the KBO League from 1989 to 1991.

Other major league pitchers who have won multiple Pitching Triple Crowns include Christy Mathewson (1905 and 1908 New York Giants), Lefty Grove (1930 and 1931 Philadelphia Athletics), Lefty Gomez (1934 and 1937 New York Yankees), and Roger Clemens (1997 and 1998 Toronto Blue Jays).

One pitcher, Guy Hecker, won a Triple Crown in a defunct 19th century major league; he led the original American Association in wins, strikeouts, and ERA in 1884 while pitching for the Louisville Colonels.

Eighteen of 24 major league pitchers who have won a Triple Crown and are eligible for the Hall of Fame have been inducted. The Triple Crown winners who most recently became eligible for the Hall are Pedro Martínez and Randy Johnson. Both were elected to the Hall of Fame in 2015, each in their first year of eligibility.

The most recent major league pitchers to achieve the feat are Chris Sale and Tarik Skubal in 2024. As of 2024, every MLB pitcher who has achieved the Triple Crown has concurrently won the Cy Young Award for that season.

== Major league records ==
The first major league pitcher to achieve the pitching Triple Crown was Tommy Bond, in the NL in 1877. The following year, Paul Hines became the first major leaguer to lead the NL in the three batting categories; he, Heinie Zimmerman, and Miguel Cabrera are the only three players to be AL or NL Triple Crown winners and not reach the Hall of Fame, although Cabrera will not be eligible for induction until 2029. The highest home run total reached by a Crown winner was Mickey Mantle, with 52 in 1956. The highest RBI total belongs to Lou Gehrig, with 165 in 1934. Rogers Hornsby has the highest home run total by an NL winner, 42, from his 1922 season. The NL high for RBI is 154, set by Joe Medwick in 1937. Hugh Duffy's .440 average in his 1894 Triple Crown season is the highest batting average by any player in major league history. Nap Lajoie, in 1901, set the all-time AL single-season high in batting average with .426.

Among the major leaguers who earned the pitching Triple Crown, the lowest ERAs belong to Walter Johnson (1.14 in 1913 AL) and Grover Alexander (1.22 in 1915 NL). The highest win total belongs to Charles Radbourn, amassed in 1884, who in that year set a major league single-season record with at least 59 wins. Radbourn struck out 441 batters that season, the highest total for a Triple Crown winner. Walter Johnson holds the highest win total by an AL pitching Triple Crown winner, with 36 in 1913. Among AL pitching Triple Crown winners, Pedro Martínez registered the highest season strikeout total, with 313 in 1999. Since 1901, the major league pitcher with the highest season strikeout total in the course of a Triple Crown season is Sandy Koufax, striking out 382 in 1965.

== Triple Crown winners ==
Key

Year	Links to the article about the corresponding Professional Baseball season
†	Member of the National Baseball Hall of Fame and Museum or Japanese Baseball Hall of Fame
‡	Player is active
*	Denotes "Major League" Triple Crown
§	Player also won the MVP Award in the same year
HR	Home runs
RBI	Runs batted in
AVG	Batting average
W	Wins
K	Strikeouts
ERA	Earned run average
NL	National League
AL	American League
AA	American Association
CL	Central League
PL	Pacific League
NNL	Negro National League (1920–1931)
ECL	Eastern Colored League
NAL	Negro American League
NN2	Negro National League (1933–1948)

=== Major League Baseball ===
==== Batting ====
Research in 2015 restored the Chicago Cubs' Heinie Zimmerman of 1912 to the list. There is doubt over whether Hugh Duffy's 1894 RBI totals were the highest.

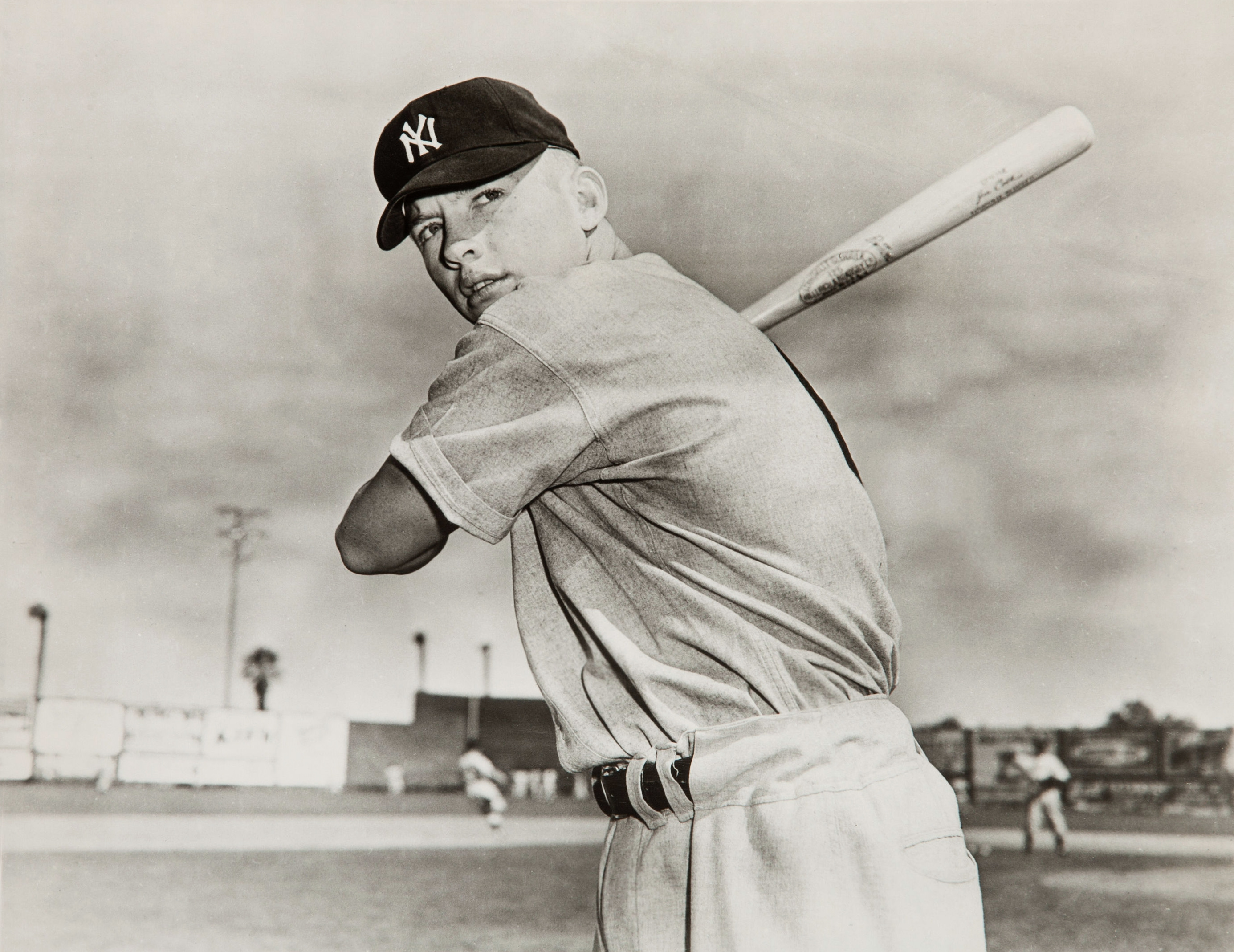
Mickey Mantle is the most recent MLB batting Triple Crown winner to lead both leagues in all three categories, achieving the feat in 1956.

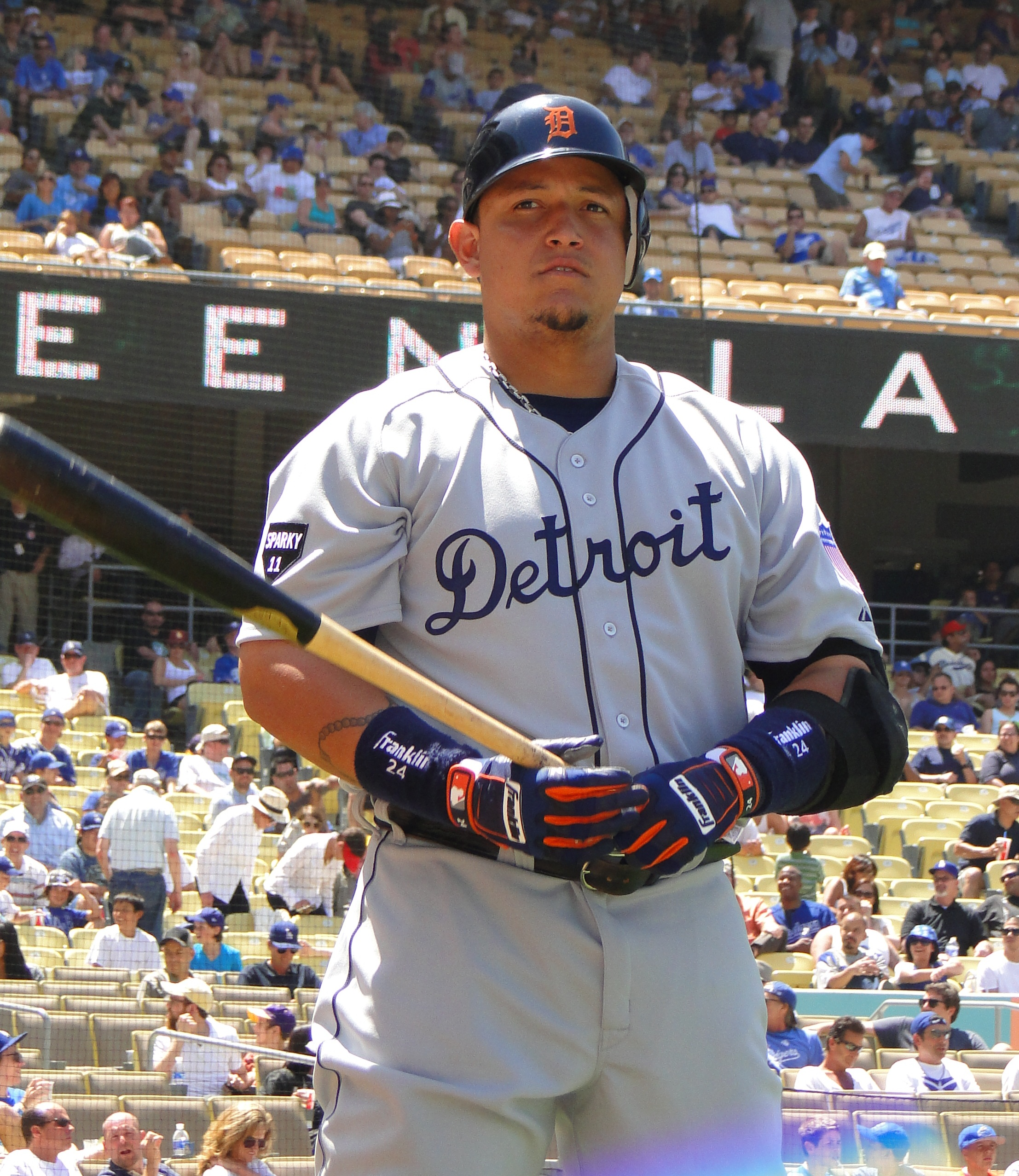
Miguel Cabrera is the most recent AL batting Triple Crown winner, achieving it in 2012; the first since 1967.

Year	Player	Position	Team	League	HR	RBI	AVG	Ref(s)
1878	Paul Hines	Center fielder	Providence Grays	NL	4*	50*	.358*	
1887	Tip O'Neill	Left fielder	St. Louis Browns	AA	14	123	.435	
1894	Hugh Duffy^{†}	Outfielder	Boston Beaneaters	NL	18	145	.440	
1901	Nap Lajoie^{†}	Second baseman	Philadelphia Athletics	AL	14	125	.426	
1909	Ty Cobb^{†}	Right fielder	Detroit Tigers	AL	9*	107*	.377*	
1912	Heinie Zimmerman	Third baseman	Chicago Cubs	NL	14	104	.372	
1922	Rogers Hornsby^{†}	Second baseman	St. Louis Cardinals	NL	42	152	.401	
1925	Rogers Hornsby^{†}	Second baseman	St. Louis Cardinals	NL	39*	143*	.403*	
1933	Jimmie Foxx^{†}^{§}	First baseman	Philadelphia Athletics	AL	48	163	.356	
1933	Chuck Klein^{†}	Right fielder	Philadelphia Phillies	NL	28	120	.368	
1934	Lou Gehrig^{†}	First baseman	New York Yankees	AL	49*	165*	.363*	
1937	Joe Medwick^{†}^{§}	Left fielder	St. Louis Cardinals	NL	31	154	.374	
1942	Ted Williams^{†}	Left fielder	Boston Red Sox	AL	36*	137*	.356*	
1947	Ted Williams^{†}	Left fielder	Boston Red Sox	AL	32	114	.343	
1956	Mickey Mantle^{†}^{§}	Center fielder	New York Yankees	AL	52*	130*	.353*	
1966	Frank Robinson^{†}^{§}	Right fielder	Baltimore Orioles	AL	49	122	.316	
1967	Carl Yastrzemski^{†}^{§}	Left fielder	Boston Red Sox	AL	44	121	.326	
2012	Miguel Cabrera^{§}	Third baseman	Detroit Tigers	AL	44	139	.330	

==== Pitching ====
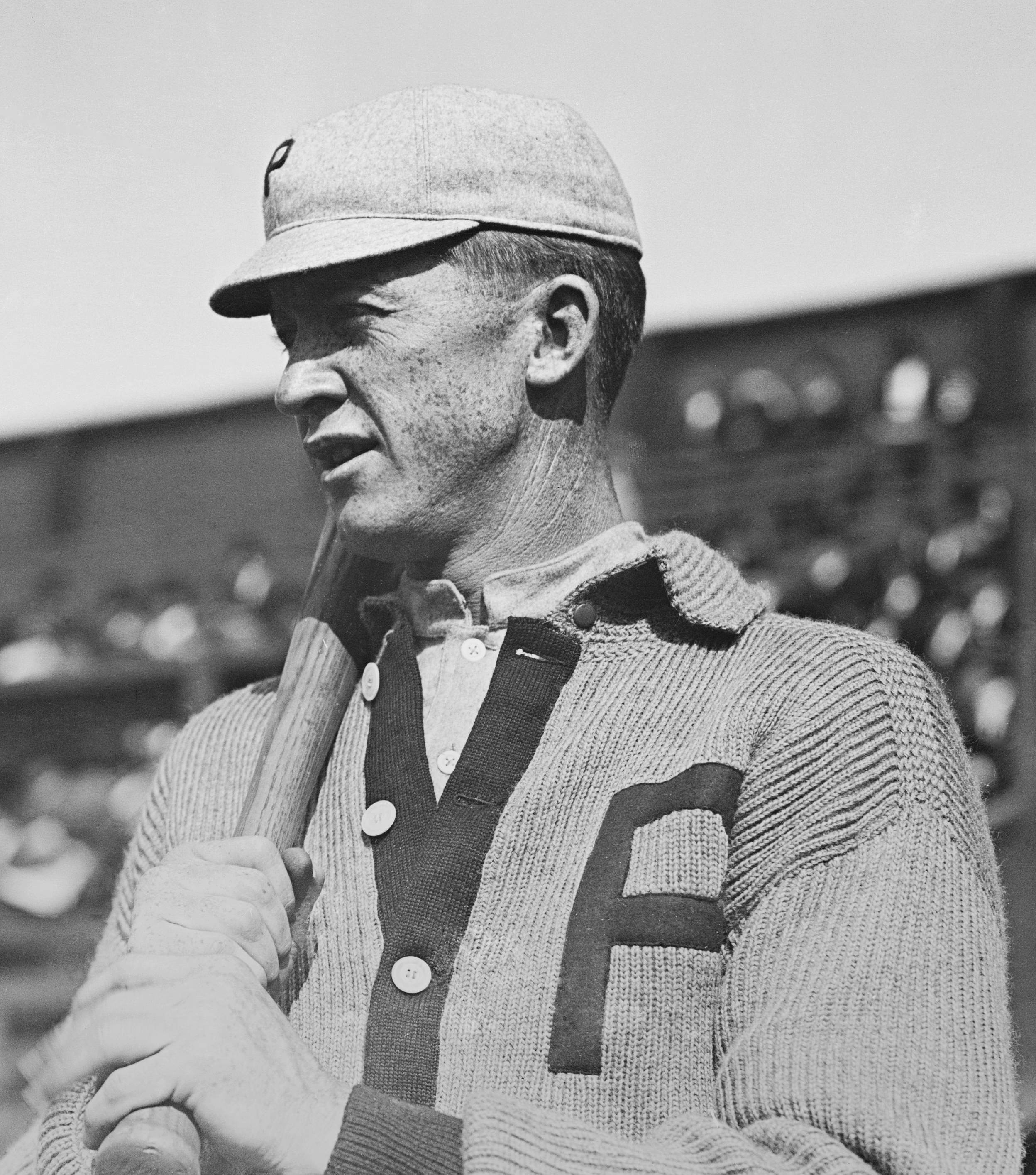
Grover Cleveland Alexander won three National League pitching Triple Crowns (1915–1916, 1920) with two different teams.

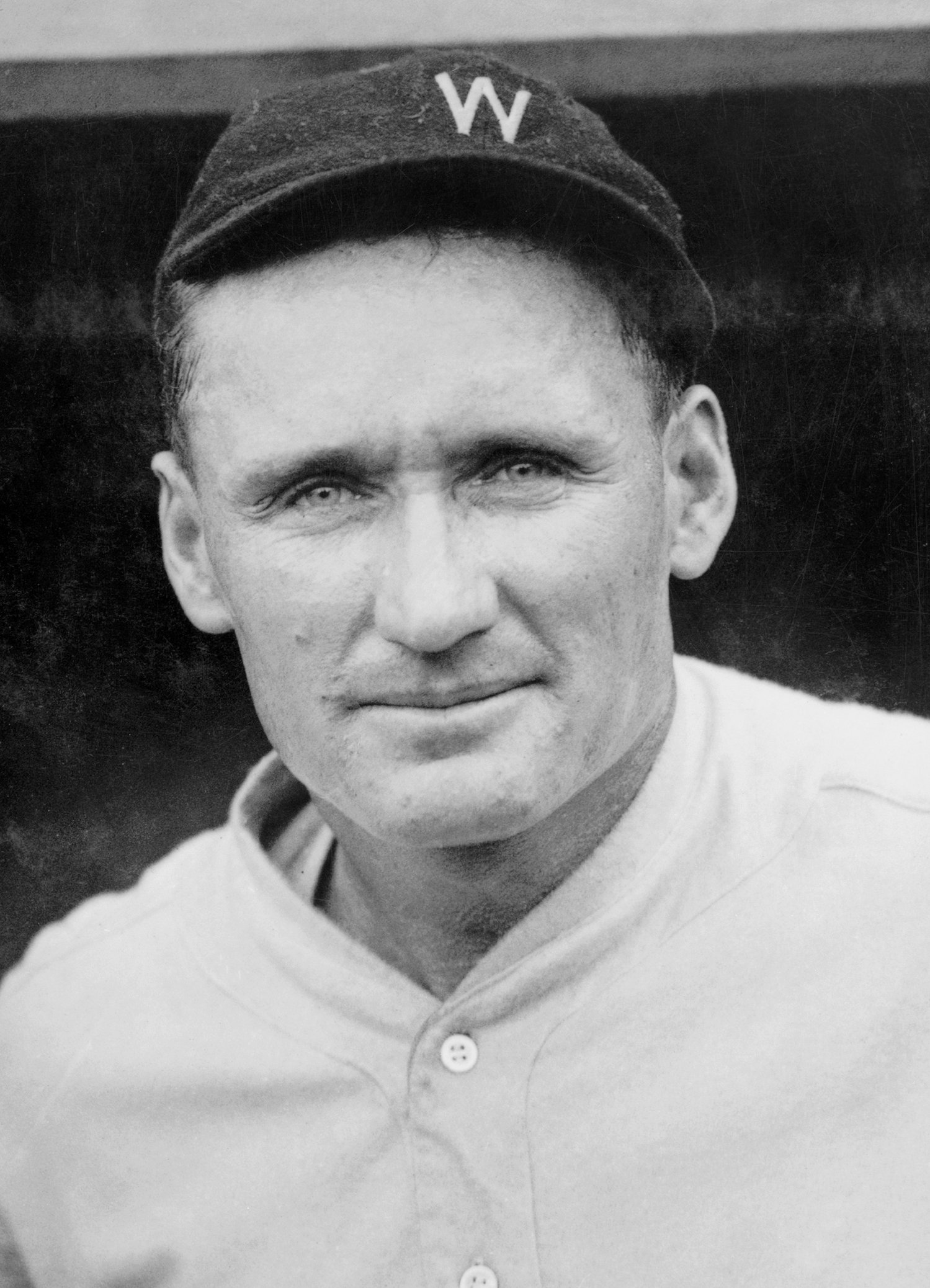
Walter Johnson won three American League pitching Triple Crowns with the Washington Senators.

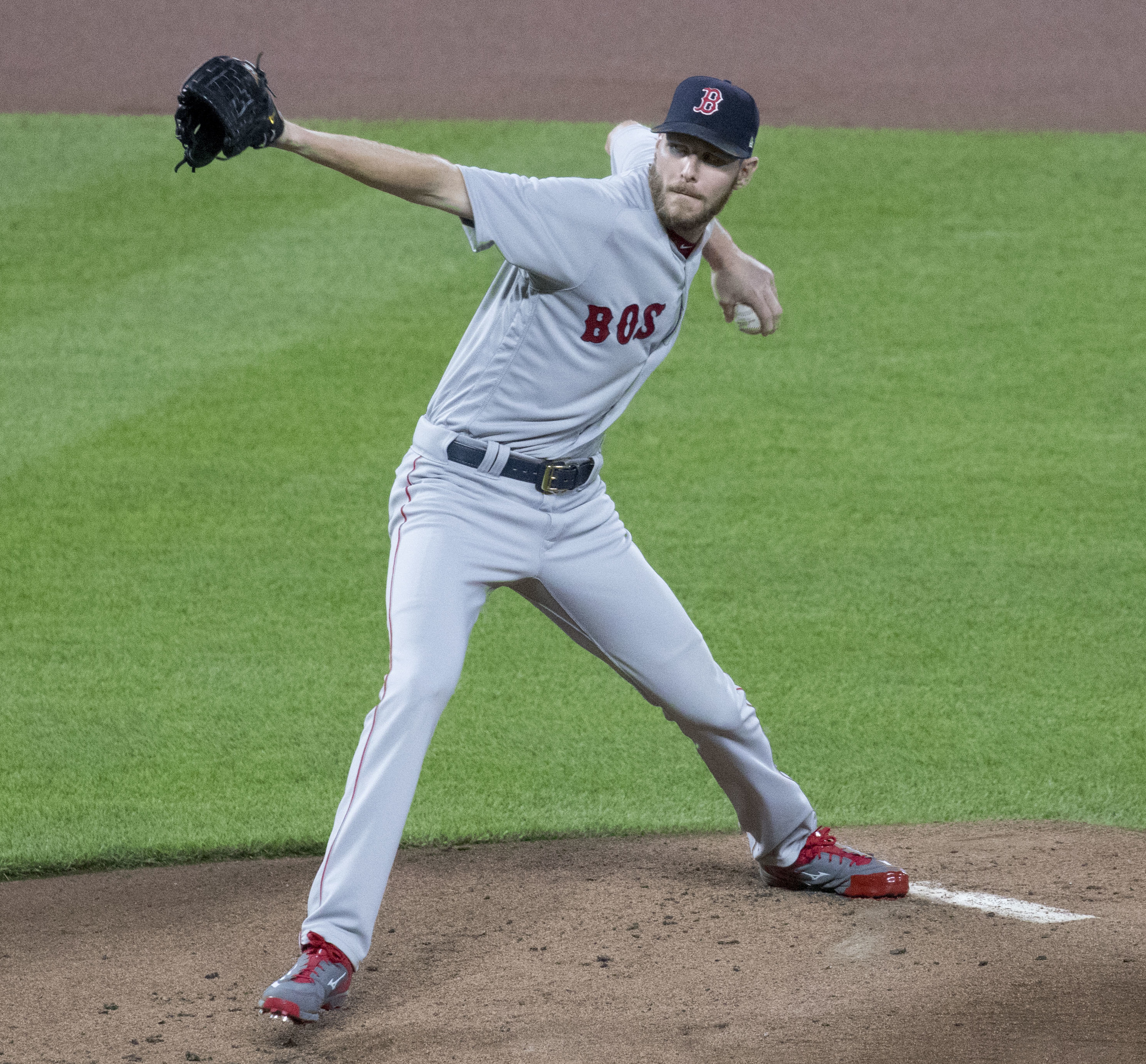
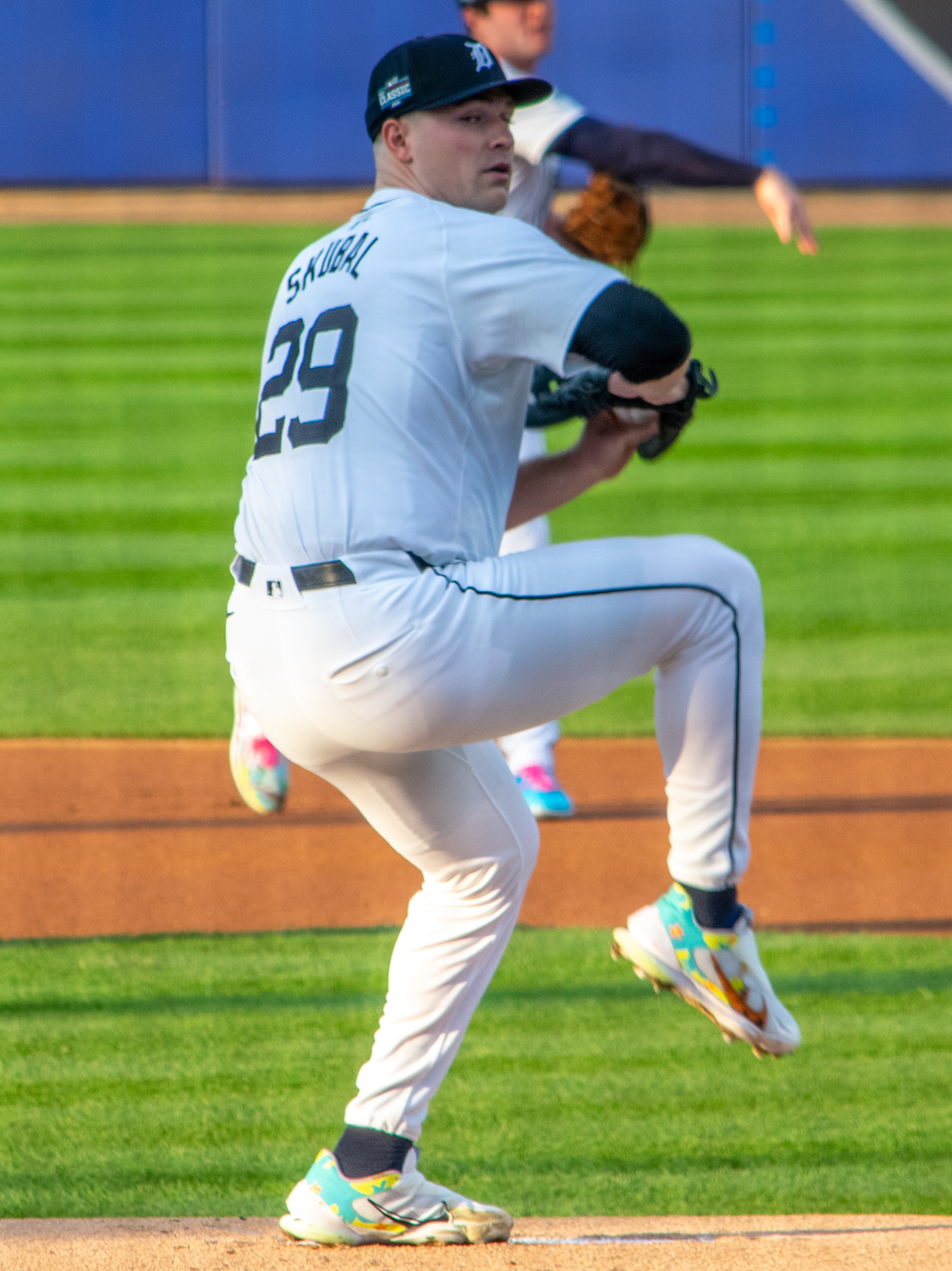
Chris Sale (top) and Tarik Skubal (bottom) are the most recent pitching Triple Crown winners, both achieving the feat in 2024

Year	Player	Team	League	ERA	W	K	Ref(s)
1877	Tommy Bond	Boston Red Caps	NL	2.11	40	170	
1884	Guy Hecker	Louisville Colonels	AA	1.80	52	385	
1884	Charles Radbourn^{†}	Providence Grays	NL	1.38	59	441	
1888	Tim Keefe^{†}	New York Giants	NL	1.74	35	335	
1889	John Clarkson^{†}	Boston Beaneaters	NL	2.73	49	284	
1894	Amos Rusie^{†}	New York Giants	NL	2.78	36	195	
1901	Cy Young^{†}	Boston Americans	AL	1.62	33	158	
1905	Christy Mathewson^{†}	New York Giants	NL	1.27	31	206	
1905	Rube Waddell^{†}	Philadelphia Athletics	AL	1.48	27	287	
1908	Christy Mathewson^{†}	New York Giants	NL	1.43	37	259	
1913	Walter Johnson^{†}	Washington Senators	AL	1.14*	36*	243*	
1915	Grover Cleveland Alexander^{†}	Philadelphia Phillies	NL	1.22*	31*	241*	
1916	Grover Cleveland Alexander^{†}	Philadelphia Phillies	NL	1.55	33	167	
1918	Walter Johnson^{†}	Washington Senators	AL	1.27*	23*	162*	
1918	Hippo Vaughn	Chicago Cubs	NL	1.74	22	148	
1920	Grover Cleveland Alexander^{†}	Chicago Cubs	NL	1.91	27	173	
1924	Walter Johnson^{†}	Washington Senators	AL	2.72	23	158	
1924	Dazzy Vance^{†}	Brooklyn Robins	NL	2.16*	28*	262*	
1930	Lefty Grove^{†}	Philadelphia Athletics	AL	2.54*	28*	209*	
1931	Lefty Grove^{†}^{§}	Philadelphia Athletics	AL	2.06*	31*	175*	
1934	Lefty Gomez^{†}	New York Yankees	AL	2.33	26	158	
1937	Lefty Gomez^{†}	New York Yankees	AL	2.33	21	194	
1939	Bucky Walters^{§}	Cincinnati Reds	NL	2.29	27	137	
1940	Bob Feller^{†}	Cleveland Indians	AL	2.61	27	261	
1945	Hal Newhouser^{†}^{§}	Detroit Tigers	AL	1.81*	25*	212*	
1963	Sandy Koufax^{†}^{§}	Los Angeles Dodgers	NL	1.88*	25*	306*	
1965	Sandy Koufax^{†}	Los Angeles Dodgers	NL	2.04*	26*	382*	
1966	Sandy Koufax^{†}	Los Angeles Dodgers	NL	1.73*	27*	317*	
1972	Steve Carlton^{†}	Philadelphia Phillies	NL	1.97	27	310	
1985	Dwight Gooden	New York Mets	NL	1.53*	24*	268*	
1997	Roger Clemens	Toronto Blue Jays	AL	2.05	21	292	
1998	Roger Clemens	Toronto Blue Jays	AL	2.65	20	271	
1999	Pedro Martínez^{†}	Boston Red Sox	AL	2.07	23	313	
2002	Randy Johnson^{†}	Arizona Diamondbacks	NL	2.32	24	334	
2006	Johan Santana	Minnesota Twins	AL	2.77*	19*	245*	
2007	Jake Peavy	San Diego Padres	NL	2.54	19	240	
2011	Clayton Kershaw	Los Angeles Dodgers	NL	2.28	21	248	
2011	Justin Verlander^{§}	Detroit Tigers	AL	2.40	24	250	
2020 (Note: The major league season in 2020 was less than half the length of a typical season, starting in late July and condensed into 60 games due to the COVID-19 pandemic.)	Shane Bieber^{‡}	Cleveland Indians	AL	1.63*	8*	122*	
2024	Chris Sale^{‡}	Atlanta Braves	NL	2.38	18	225	
2024	Tarik Skubal^{‡}	Detroit Tigers	AL	2.39	18	228	

=== Negro league baseball ===
On December 16, 2020, Major League Baseball announced that the records of Negro league baseball from 1920 to 1948 would be designated as major league status. As such, seven different leagues that existed in that time period are now recognized as being on the same level as MLB. Seven batters and four pitchers achieved the Triple Crown in that era.

==== Batting ====
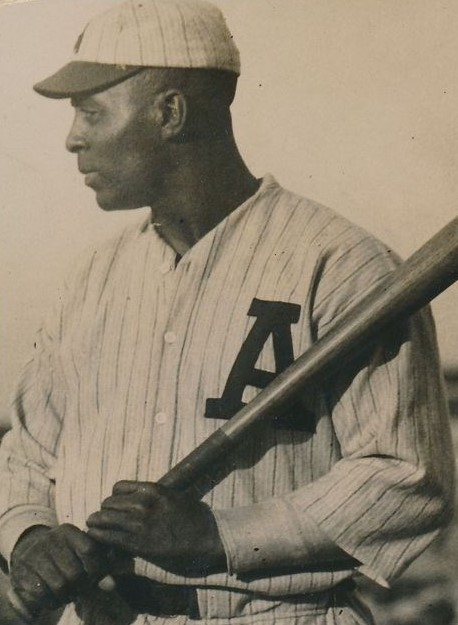
Oscar Charleston won three batting Triple Crowns, the most for any American player

Year	Player	Position	Team	League	HR	RBI	AVG	Ref(s)
1921	Oscar Charleston^{†}	Center fielder	St. Louis Giants	NNL	15	91	.433	
1923	Heavy Johnson	Outfielder	Kansas City Monarchs	NNL	20	120	.406	
1924	Oscar Charleston^{†}	Center fielder	Harrisburg Giants	ECL	15	63	.405	
1925	Oscar Charleston^{†}	Center fielder	Harrisburg Giants	ECL	20	97	.427	
1926	Mule Suttles^{†}	First baseman	St. Louis Stars	NNL	32	130	.425	
1930	Willie Wells^{†}	Shortstop	St. Louis Stars	NNL	17	114	.411	
1936	Josh Gibson^{†}	Catcher	Pittsburgh Crawfords	NNL2	18	66	.389	
1937	Josh Gibson^{†}	Catcher	Homestead Grays	NNL2	20	73	.417	
1942	Ted Strong	Right field	Kansas City Monarchs	NAL	6	32	.364	
1942	Lennie Pearson	First baseman	Newark Eagles	NNL2	11	56	.347	

==== Pitching ====
Year	Player	Team	League	ERA	W	K	Ref(s)
1934	Slim Jones	Philadelphia Stars	Negro National League II	1.24	20	164	
1938	Ray Brown^{†}	Homestead Grays	Negro National League II	1.88	14	70	
1938	Hilton Smith^{†}	Kansas City Monarchs	Negro American League	1.92	9	88	
1943	Johnny Wright	Homestead Grays	National League II	2.54	18	94	

=== Nippon Professional Baseball ===
==== Batting ====
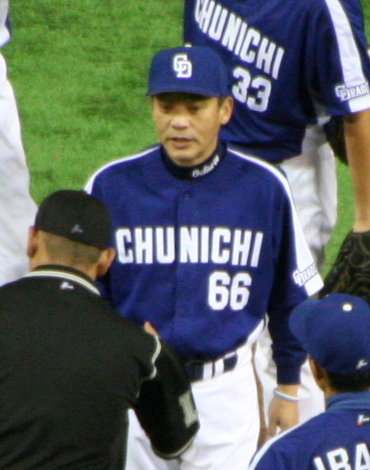
NPB Hall of Famer Hiromitsu Ochiai is tied with Oscar Charleston for the most batting Triple Crowns (three) in any league.

Year	Player	Position	Team	League	HR	RBI	AVG	Ref(s)
1938 Fall	Haruyasu Nakajima ^{†} ^{§}	First Baseman	Tokyo Giants	JPBL	10*	38*	.361*	
1965	Katsuya Nomura ^{†} ^{§}	Catcher	Nankai Hawks	PL	42	110	.320	
1973	Sadaharu Oh ^{†} ^{§}	First Baseman	Yomiuri Giants	CL	51	114	.355	
1974	Sadaharu Oh ^{†} ^{§}	First Baseman	Yomiuri Giants	CL	49	107	.332	
1982	Hiromitsu Ochiai ^{†} ^{§}	Third Baseman	Lotte Orions	PL	32	99	.325	
1984	Greg Wells ^{§}	First baseman	Hankyu Braves	PL	37	130	.355	
1985	Hiromitsu Ochiai ^{†} ^{§}	Third Baseman	Lotte Orions	PL	52	146	.367	
1985	Randy Bass ^{†} ^{§}	First Baseman	Hanshin Tigers	CL	54	134	.350	
1986	Hiromitsu Ochiai ^{†}	Third Baseman	Lotte Orions	PL	50	116	.360	
1986	Randy Bass ^{†}	First Baseman	Hanshin Tigers	CL	47	109	.389	
2004	Nobuhiko Matsunaka ^{§}	Left Fielder	Fukuoka Daiei Hawks	PL	44	120	.358	
2022	Munetaka Murakami ^{§}	Third Baseman	Tokyo Yakult Swallows	CL	56	134	.318	
2026	Teruaki Satō	Third Baseman	Hanshin Tigers	CL	39	106	.306	

==== Pitching ====
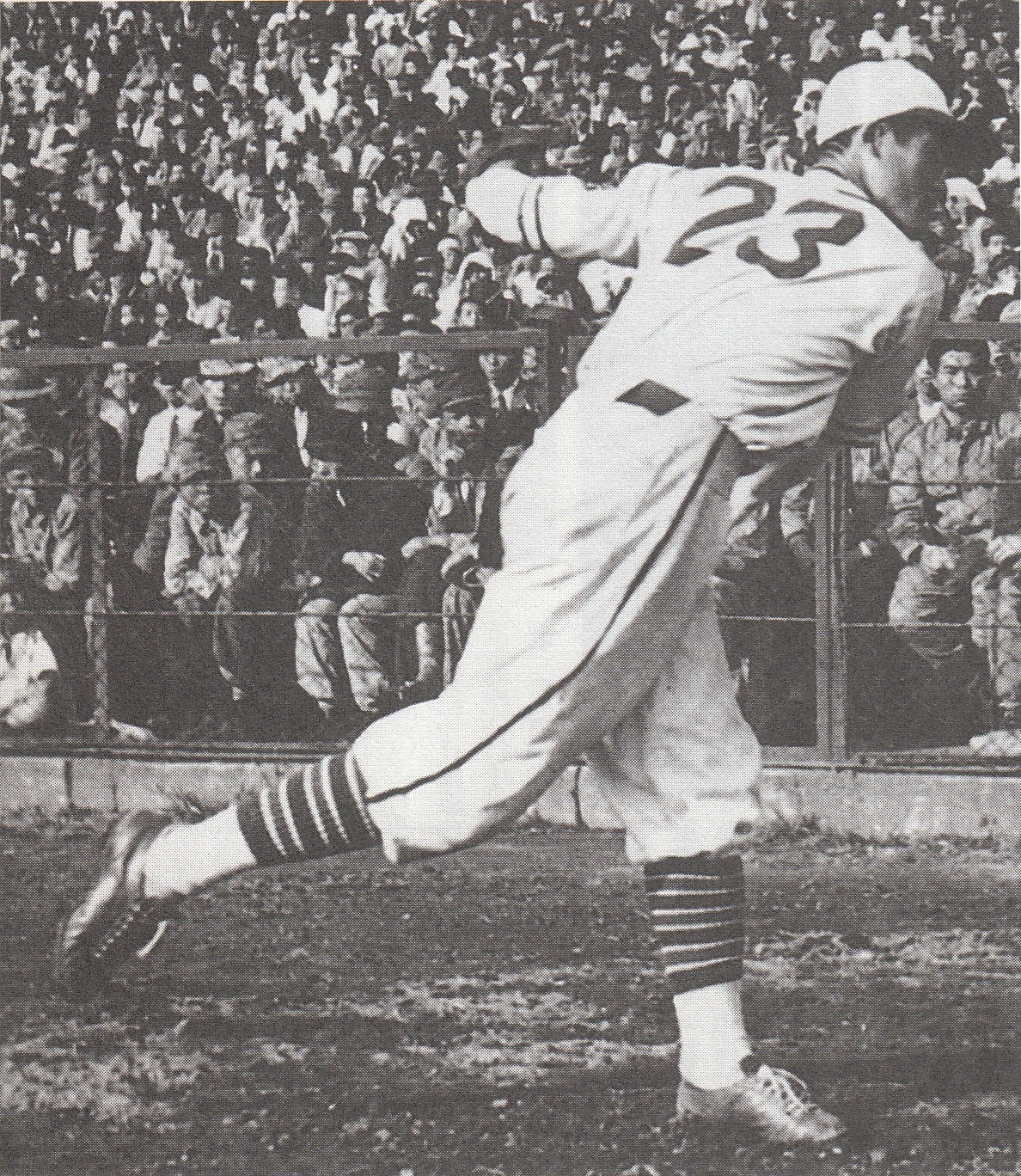
Hideo Fujimoto had the lowest single season ERA of any triple crown winning season, regardless of league, with a 0.73 ERA

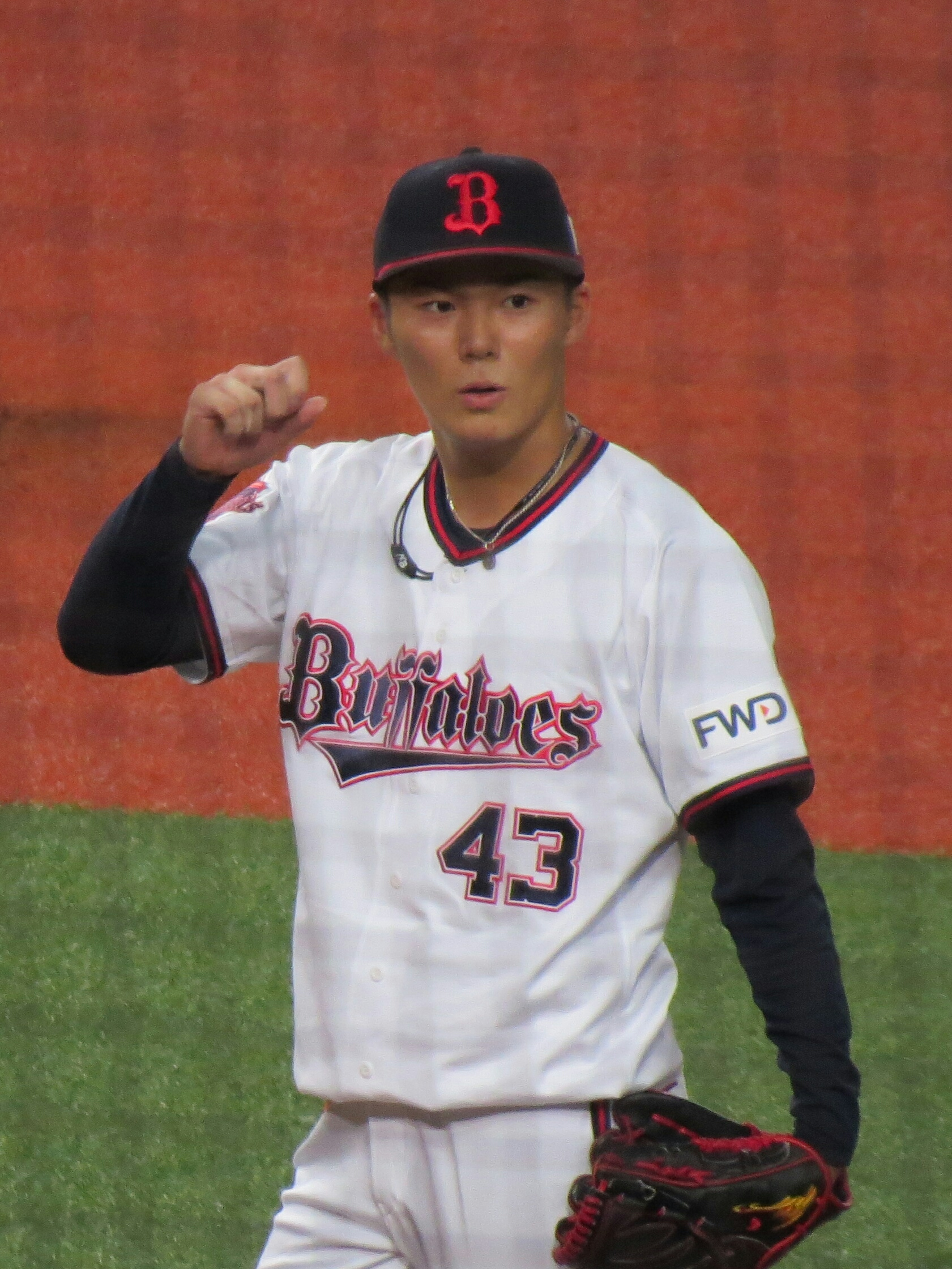
Yoshinobu Yamamoto is the only pitcher in the history of Nippon Professional Baseball to win three pitching Triple Crowns consecutively

Year	Player	Team	League	ERA	W	K	Ref(s)
1937 Spring	Eiji Sawamura ^{†} ^{§}	Tokyo Giants	JPBL	0.81*	24*	196*	
1938 Fall	Victor Starffin ^{†}	Tokyo Giants	JPBL	1.05*	19*	146*	
1943	Hideo Fujimoto ^{†}	Tokyo Giants	JPBL	0.73*	34*	253*	
1948	Hiroshi Nakao	Yomiuri Giants	JPBL	1.84*	27*	187*	
1954	Shigeru Sugishita ^{†} ^{§}	Chunichi Dragons	CL	1.39	32	273	
1954	Motoji Takuwa	Nankai Hawks	PL	1.58	26	275	
1958	Masaichi Kaneda ^{†}	Kokutetsu Swallows	CL	1.30	31	311	
1958	Kazuhisa Inao^{†} ^{§}	Nishitetsu Lions	PL	1.42	33	334	
1959	Tadashi Sugiura ^{†}	Nankai Hawks	PL	1.40	38	336	
1961	Hiroshi Gondo ^{†}	Chunichi Dragons	CL	1.70	35	310	
1961	Kazuhisa Inao ^{†}	Nishitetsu Lions	PL	1.69	42	353	
1978	Keishi Suzuki^{†}	Kintetsu Buffaloes	PL	2.02	25	178	
1980	Isamu Kida	Nippon Ham Fighters	PL	2.28	22	225	
1981	Suguru Egawa	Yomiuri Giants	CL	2.29	20	221	
1985	Tatsuo Komatsu	Chunichi Dragons	CL	2.65	17	172	
1990	Hideo Nomo ^{†}	Kintetsu Buffaloes	PL	2.91	18	287	
1999	Koji Uehara	Yomiuri Giants	CL	2.09	20	179	
2006	Kazumi Saito	Fukuoka SoftBank Hawks	PL	1.75	18	205	
2010	Kenta Maeda ‡	Hiroshima Carp	CL	2.21	15	174	
2018	Tomoyuki Sugano	Yomiuri Giants	CL	2.14	15	200	
2020	Kodai Senga	Fukuoka SoftBank Hawks	PL	2.16	11	149	
2021	Yoshinobu Yamamoto ^{§}	Orix Buffaloes	PL	1.39*	18*	206*	
2022	Yoshinobu Yamamoto ^{§}	Orix Buffaloes	PL	1.68*	15*	205*	
2023	Yoshinobu Yamamoto ^{§}	Orix Buffaloes	PL	1.21	16	169	

=== KBO League ===
==== Batting ====
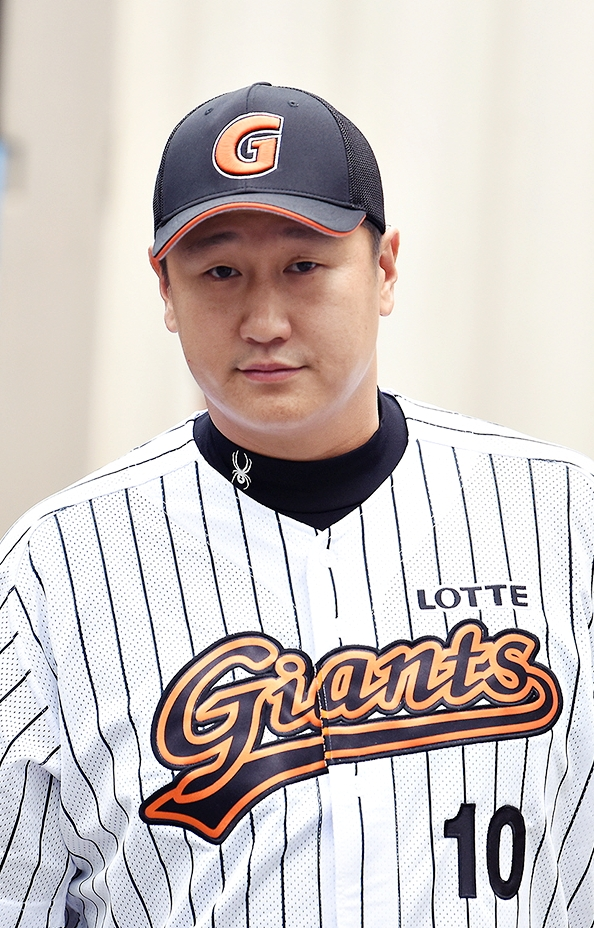
Dae-ho Lee is the only player in KBO League history to achieve the triple crown as a batter twice.

Year	Player	Position	Team	HR	RBI	AVG	Ref(s)
1984	Lee Man-soo	Catcher	Samsung Lions	23	80	.340	
2006	Lee Dae-ho	First Baseman	Lotte Giants	26	88	.336	
2010	Lee Dae-ho ^{§}	Third Baseman	Lotte Giants	44	133	.364	

==== Pitching ====
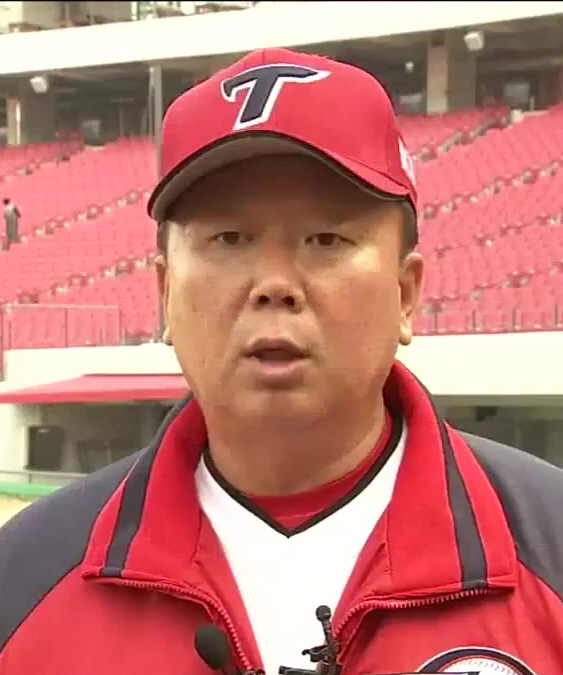
Sun Dong-yol is the only player in KBO league history to achieve the triple crown as a pitcher three times.

Since the KBO League's strikeout titles began to be officially awarded in the 1993 season, the criteria for KBO League pitchers Triple Crown until 1992 are wins, ERA, and a pitcher's winning percentage.

===== The Standard of 1982–1992 =====
Year	Player	Team	WPCT	ERA	W	K	SO Rank	Ref(s)
1982	Park Chul-soon ^{§}	OB Bears	.857	1.84	24	108	2nd	
1989	Sun Dong-yol ^{§}	Haitai Tigers	.875	1.17	21	198	1st	
1990	Sun Dong-yol ^{§}	Haitai Tigers	.786	1.13	22	189	1st	
1991	Sun Dong-yol ^{§}	Haitai Tigers	.826	1.55	19	210	1st	

===== The Standard of 1993–present =====
Year	Player	Team	ERA	W	K	Ref(s)
1986	Sun Dong-yol ^{§}	Haitai Tigers	0.99	24	214	
2006	Ryu Hyun-jin ‡^{§}	Hanwha Eagles	2.23	18	204	
2011	Yoon Suk-min ^{§}	KIA Tigers	2.45	17	178	
2023	Erick Fedde ^{§}	NC Dinos	2.00	20	209	
2025	Cody Ponce ^{§}	Hanwha Eagles	1.89	17	252	

Sun Dong-yol won the MVP of the season in 1986 with getting annual wins, strikeout, and ERA title. But as mentioned above, the KBO League's pitcher triple crown standard at that time was a winning-rate title, not a strikeout, so it is officially considered that Sun Dong-yeol in 1986 did not achieve the triple crown. Sun Dong-yol's winning percentage in the 1986 season was .800, ranking 2nd in the league.

=== Women's Pro Baseball League ===
==== Batting ====
Year	Player	Position	Team	HR	RBI	AVG	Ref(s)
2026	Denae Benites	Catcher	New York Heights	11	38	.552	

== See also ==
- Cy Young Award
- Hank Aaron Award
- List of Major League Baseball awards
- Major League Baseball Most Valuable Player Award
