= Lee Man-soo =

South Korean baseball player and coach

- Catcher, First baseman
- Born: 9 September 1958 (age 67)
- Batted: Right Threw: Right

KBO debut
- March 27, 1982, for the Samsung Lions

Last KBO appearance
- 1997, for the Samsung Lions

Career statistics
- Batting average: .296
- Home runs: 252
- Hits: 1,276
- RBI: 861

Teams
- As player: Samsung Lions (1982–1997); As coach: Chicago White Sox (2000–2007); SK Wyverns (2007–2011); As manager: SK Wyverns (2011–2014)

Career highlights and awards
- First Korean Triple Crown (1984); KBO champion (1985; no Korean Series played); KBO MVP (1983); 5× KBO Golden Glove Award winner (1983–87)

- Lee Man-soo
- Hangul: 이만수
- Hanja: 李萬洙
- RR: I Mansu
- MR: I Mansu

Lee Man-soo's number 22 was retired by the Samsung Lions in 2003.

Lee Man-soo (Korean: 이만수; Hanja: 李萬洙; born September 9, 1958, in Cheorwon, Gangwon Province, South Korea), also spelled as Man Soo Lee, is a former Korea Professional Baseball catcher and First baseman and manager. After a distinguished career as a professional player in South Korea from 1982 to 1997, Lee moved on to coaching in 1998, including positions on the coaching staff of the Chicago White Sox, and came back to South Korea in 2006 to serve as a bench coach for the SK Wyverns.

== Playing career ==
Upon graduation from Hanyang University in 1982, Lee made an agreement with the Korea Baseball Organization to play for one of the new pro league's teams instead of remaining in the amateur league. Prior to the inaugural Korean professional baseball season, Lee was finally signed by the Samsung Lions. In the first game of the KBO pro league on March 27, 1982, Lee hit the first home run in Korean professional baseball history against the MBC Chungyong. Lee was a regular catcher of the Lions during the 1982 season and helped his team to reach to the inaugural Korean Series, where the Lions lost to the OB Bears, 4–1–1.

Lee, nicknamed "Hulk" and "Babe Ruth of Korea" for his power and home run ability, was a full-time catcher and first baseman for 16 seasons with the Samsung Lions, hitting 252 home runs and knocking in 861 RBIs during his career. In 1983, he won his first home run title and was named league MVP, and the next year became the league's first triple crown winner as the leader in three major offensive categories ― home runs (23), runs batted in (80) and batting average (.340). His home run and RBI totals also led the league in 1985. Gold Gloves came in 5 straight years, 1983–1987, and he appeared in 12 All-Star games. Lee's ultimate career home run total, 252, remained the record until Chang Jong-hoon of the Hanwha Eagles hit his 253rd on May 23, 1999.

== Coaching career ==
After retiring in 1997, Lee began his coaching career in the United States as the hitting coach for the Class A Kinston Indians in 1998. He moved to the White Sox organization in 1999, and served as the first base coach for the White Sox AAA affiliate Charlotte Knights until assuming his bullpen position with the big club in 2000. From 2000 to 2006, Lee was a coaching staff for the Chicago White Sox, the first Korean to coach in the major leagues. In 2005, as a coach for the White Sox, he earned a World Series ring following the 2005 World Series.

After the 2006 season, Lee returned to South Korea and signed a two-year contract with the SK Wyverns as the club's bench coach on October 30, 2006. On August 18, 2011, SK Wyverns manager Kim Sung-keun was sacked following his decision to retire from coaching after the 2011 season. Kim's dismissal came just one day after the 68-year-old manager announced his decision to step down from his post at the end of the season, and Lee was named interim manager of the Wyverns on the same day.

== See also ==
- List of KBO career home run leaders
