= Sun Dong-yol =

South Korean baseball player (born 1963)

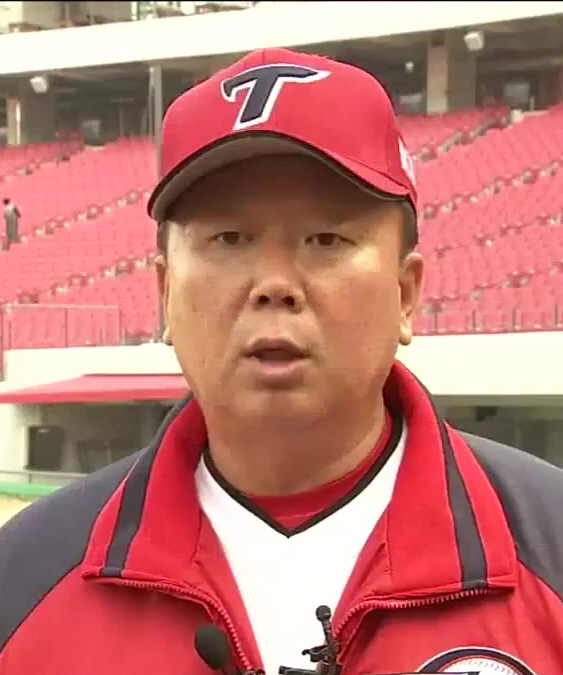
- Sun with the Kia Tigers
- Pitcher / Manager
- Born: January 10, 1963 (age 63); Gwangju, South Korea
- Batted: Right Threw: Right

Professional debut
- KBO: July 2, 1985, for the Haitai Tigers
- NPB: April 5, 1996, for the Chunichi Dragons

Last appearance
- KBO: October, 1995, for the Haitai Tigers
- NPB: October 27, 1999, for the Chunichi Dragons

KBO statistics
- Win–loss record: 146−40
- Earned run average: 1.20
- Strikeouts: 1,698
- Saves: 132
- No-hitters: 1

NPB statistics
- Win–loss record: 10−4
- Earned run average: 2.70
- Strikeouts: 228
- Saves: 98
- Stats at Baseball Reference

Teams
- As player: Haitai Tigers (1985–1995); Chunichi Dragons (1996–1999); As coach: Chunichi Dragons (2003); Samsung Lions (2004); As manager: Samsung Lions (2005–2010); Kia Tigers (2011–2014)

Career highlights and awards
- KBO: 3× KBO MVP (1986, 1989, 1990); 6× KBO Golden Glove (1986, 1988–1991, 1993); 9× KBO All-Star (1986–1994); 4× KBO wins leader (1986, 1989–1991); 8× KBO ERA leader (1985–1991, 1993); 5× KBO strikeout leader (1986, 1988–1991); 2× KBO saves leader (1993, 1995); 4× Korean Triple Crown (1986, 1989–1991); 6× Korean Series champion (1986–1989, 1991, 1993); Kia Tigers No. 18 retired; International: Amateur World Series MVP (1982)
Medals
Men's baseball
Representing South Korea
Amateur World Series
| Gold medal – first place | 1982 South Korea | Team |
World Junior Baseball Championship
| Gold medal – first place | 1981 Newark | Team |
Asian Baseball Championship
| Gold medal – first place | 1983 Seoul | Team |
| Silver medal – second place | 1985 Perth | Team |

- Sun Dong-yol
- Hangul: 선동열
- Hanja: 宣銅烈
- RR: Seon Dongyeol
- MR: Sŏn Tongyŏl

Sun Dong-yol (Korean: 선동열; born January 10, 1963) is a South Korean former professional baseball player and manager. Sun played 15 seasons as a pitcher for the KBO League's Haitai Tigers and NPB's Chunichi Dragons. After retiring as a player, he pursued a career as a manager and coach for the Tigers, Dragons, and the Samsung Lions.

Sun is one of the most celebrated pitchers in the history of the KBO League. He was voted Most Valuable Player of the league three times, won the Pitching Triple Crown four times, was awarded six Golden Gloves, and was a nine-time KBO All-Star. His 1.20 ERA stands as the lowest ever recorded in Korean professional baseball history.

== Amateur career ==
Upon graduating from Gwangju Jeil High School, Sun joined the Korea University collegiate baseball team in 1981. During this time, he also represented South Korea internationally at the 1982 Baseball World Cup, the 1983 Intercontinental Cup, and at the 1984 Summer Olympics in Los Angeles, California.

== Professional career ==
=== KBO League ===
==== Haitai Tigers ====
Signed by the Haitai Tigers, Sun made his debut in the KBO League against the Samsung Lions on July 2, 1985. In his inaugural year, he finished with a 7−4 record, a 1.70 ERA, and 103 strikeouts.

Sun achieved a breakout season in 1986, dominating the league with a record of 24−6 and an ERA of 0.99 with 214 strikeouts in 262.2 innings of work, and became the second KBO pitcher to win the Pitching Triple Crown since Park Chul-soon in 1983.

In 1987, Sun went 14−2 with a 0.89 ERA and 144 strikeouts, and won the ERA title again and finished second in wins and third in strikeouts. During the season, in a game against the Lotte Giants on May 16, Sun and his opponent, the equally as renowned Choi Dong-won, threw a combined 441 pitches over the course of 15 innings which eventually ended in a 2-2 draw. The matchup is now seen as one of the finest performances in KBO history.

In 1988, Sun was 16−5, notching 200 strikeouts and a 1.21 ERA, and won the ERA and strikeout titles.

In 1989, Sun finished the year by winning his second Pitching Triple Crown, leading the league in wins (21), ERA (1.17) and strikeouts (198). On July 6, 1989, he recorded the fifth no-hitter in a complete game shut-out in the KBO history against the Samsung Lions.

In 1990, Sun won his third Pitching Triple Crown, going 22−6 with a 1.13 ERA and 189 strikeouts, allowing only one home run in 190.1 innings pitched.

In 1991, Sun grabbed his fourth Pitching Triple Crown with a 19−4 record, a 1.55 ERA, and 210 strikeouts.

During the 1992 season, Sun was on the disabled list for several months. Meanwhile, Tigers' manager Kim Eung-ryong intended to use him as a long reliever or closer, and Sun was eventually moved into the closer's role as he came back from injury. In 1992, he saved 8 games and compiled a 0.28 ERA in 32.2 innings pitched.

In 1993, his first full season as a relief pitcher, Sun finished with a 10−3 record, a league-leading 31 saves, and 164 strikeouts in 126.1 innings pitched. Though it is very rare for a reliever to get enough innings, he became the first closer relief pitcher to win the ERA title with a 0.78 ERA, pitching more than the required innings to qualify for the title.

In 1994, he had the only mediocre season of his KBO career. He saved only 12 games with a 6-4 record and 94 strikeouts in 102.1 innings pitched, and his 2.73 ERA was the highest of his career.

However, Sun came back strong in 1995, leading the KBO league with 33 saves and recording a 0.49 ERA in 109.1 innings pitched.

=== Nippon Professional Baseball ===
==== Chunichi Dragons ====
After the 1995 KBO season, Sun announced that he would leave the KBO for a move to either MLB or NPB. After the announcement, the Chunichi Dragons and Yomiuri Giants of NPB swiftly attempted to acquire him to fill their bullpen void. In December 1995, Sun managed to sign a contract with the Chunichi Dragons on a four-year loan deal from the Tigers.

Sun made his NPB debut on April 6, 1996 against the Hiroshima Toyo Carp at the Nagoya Dome, but ended up blowing save. During his inaugural NPB season, Sun struggled to adjust himself to the Japanese style of play, and was sent down to the reserve team of the Dragons several times. He finished the worst year of his career with only 3 saves and a 5.50 ERA, never garnering more than mop-up duties.

After the disastrous debut season, Sun bounced back and performed strongly in the 1997 season. He led the Central League in saves, with 38, and posted a 1.28 ERA with 68 strikeouts. During the season, he did not allow any home runs in 63.1 innings of work. Sun also appeared at the 1997 Japan All-Star Game.

Sun continued to dominate the league as an elite closer in 1998, saving 29 games with a 1.48 ERA and 58 strikeouts.

In 1999, Sun notched 28 saves (the league's runner-up) and a 2.61 ERA, and allowed only one home run, appearing in 39 games. As a key member of the Chunichi Dragons, he led his team to their first Central League title since 1988.

After the 1999 season, the Chunichi Dragons attempted to renew the contract with Sun as the contract was expired, but the Dragons didn't reach agreement on the new contract with Sun's former team Haitai Tigers, which required another loan for the contract extension.

Amid controversy, Sun announced retirement on November 22, 1999 after he finally failed to sign with the Dragons.

Meanwhile, the Haitai Tigers in the KBO also planned to set his final game with a ceremony in Gwangju, South Korea. However, Sun decided to play his final game in Nagoya, Japan.

On March 6, 2000, Sun started the Dragons' first 2000 pre-season game against the Yomiuri Giants in Nagoya Dome, and threw two pitches against Hideki Matsui, allowing a single in his final pitch. The game was followed by an elaborate retirement ceremony.

== In popular culture ==
Sun was portrayed in the 2011 film Perfect Game, being played by Yang Dong-geun

== See also ==
- List of KBO career win leaders
- List of KBO career strikeout leaders
- List of KBO career saves leaders
