= Park Chul-soon =

South Korean baseball player (born 1956)

- Pitcher
- Born: March 12, 1956; Pusan, South Korea
- Batted: Right Threw: Right

Professional debut
- MiLB: 1980, for the Stockton Ports
- KBO: 1982, for the OB Bears

Last appearance
- MiLB: 1981, for the El Paso Diablos
- KBO: 1996, for the OB Bears

MiLB statistics
- Win–loss: 11–12
- Earned run average: 4.30
- Strikeouts: 143

KBO statistics
- Win–loss: 76–53
- Earned run average: 2.95
- Strikeouts: 648
- Stats at Baseball Reference

Teams
- As player: OB Bears (1982–1996); As coach: OB Bears (1997–1998)

Career highlights and awards
- KBO League MVP (1982); KBO Pitching Triple Crown (1982); 2× Korean Series champion (1982, 1995); Doosan Bears #21 retired

- Park Chul-soon
- Hangul: 박철순
- Hanja: 朴哲淳
- RR: Bak Cheolsun
- MR: Pak Ch'ŏlsun

Park Chul-soon (Korean: 박철순; Hanja: 朴哲淳; also spelled Cheol Sun Park, Bak Cheol-sun; born March 12, 1956) is a former South Korean pitcher in the KBO League who played for the OB Bears. Park batted and threw right-handed. He was the second South Korean player to sign with a Major League team and play in the minor leagues after Lee Won-Kuk.

== Amateur career ==
Park attended Daeseong High School in Daejeon and Baemyung High School in Seoul. After high school Park went on to pitch for Yonsei University, where in 1979 he excelled in a Korean-American university baseball championship, which led to him being signed to a contract by the Milwaukee Brewers.

== Professional career ==
=== Minor League Baseball ===
Coming to the United States in 1980, Park pitched for the Class-A Stockton Ports and then the Double-A El Paso Diablos. During his two years in the Minor Leagues, Park finished 11–12 with a 4.30 earned run average.

=== KBO League ===
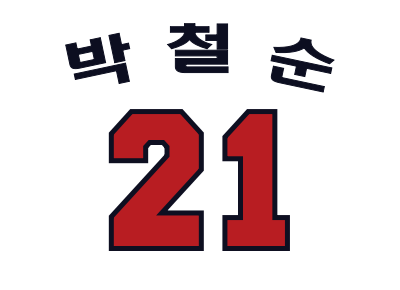
Park Chul-Soon's number 21 was retired by the Doosan Bears in 2002.

Returning to South Korea, Park joined the OB Bears of the newly formed Korea Baseball Organization. He quickly established himself as the best pitcher in the league, at one point winning an all-time record 22 games in a row, and finishing the season with 24 wins, a 1.84 ERA, and 108 strikeouts. He won the inaugural KBO League Most Valuable Player Award as well as the Pitching Triple Crown.

Injuries, however, sidelined Park for most of 1983 and all of 1984. Returning to the league in 1985, he earned the nickname "Phoenix," but never pitched more than 116 2/3 innings in another season. Converted to a reliever, but still injury-plagued, he eventually pitched 13 seasons in all for the Bears. In August 1994, at age 38, he set a KBO record for being the oldest pitcher to throw a shutout when he beat the Taepyeongyang Dolphins. (The record was late broken by Song Jin-woo].)

Park retired after the 1996 season to become the Bears' pitching coach, where he remained until 1998.

Park Chul-Soon's number 21 was retired by the Doosan Bears in 2002.
