= Kim Si-jin =

South Korean baseball player and manager

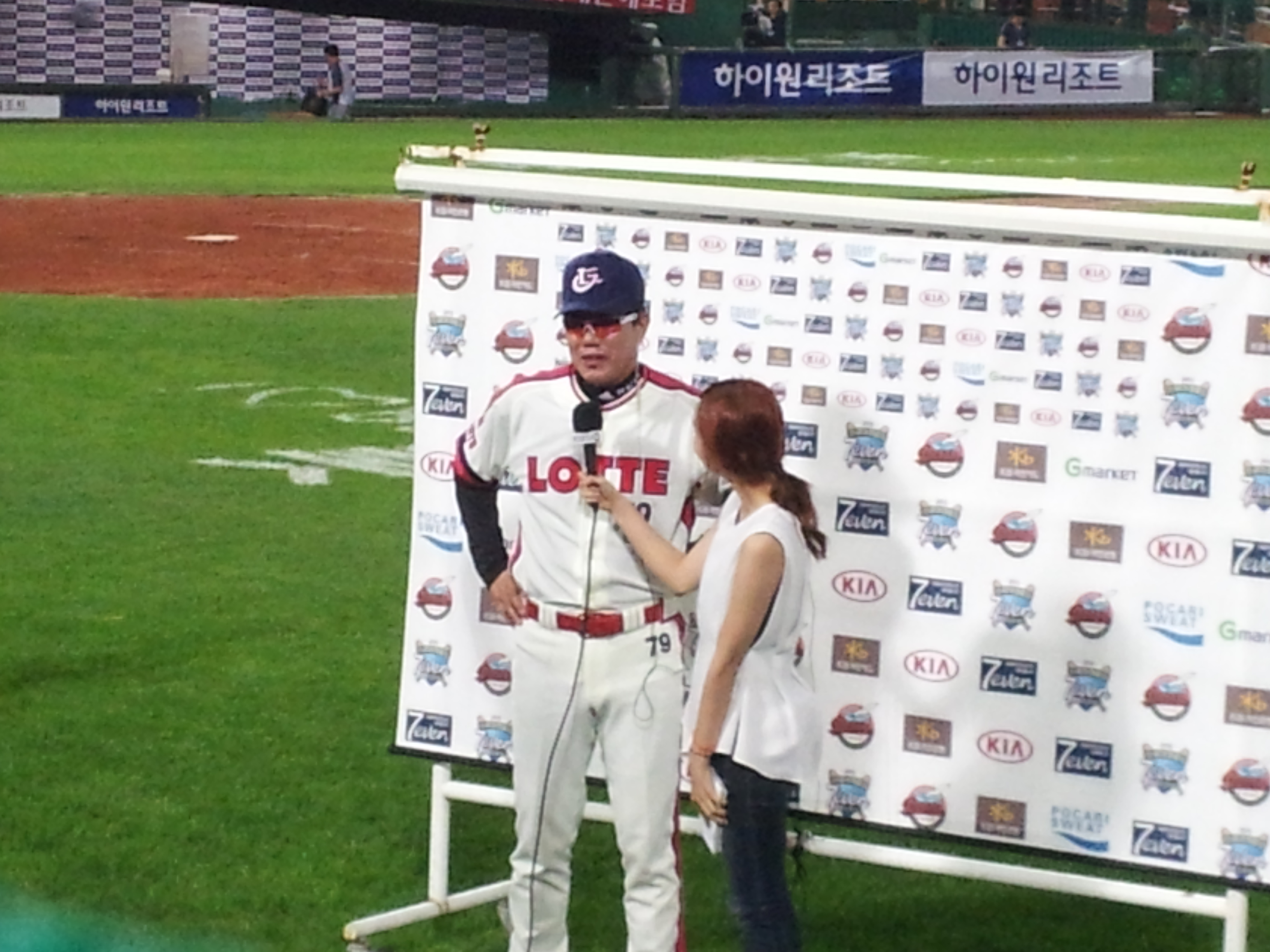
- June 2013 in Sajik Baseball Stadium
- Pitcher
- Born: March 20, 1958 (age 68)
- Batted: Right Threw: Right

KBO debut
- 1983, for the Samsung Lions

Last KBO appearance
- 1992, for the Lotte Giants

KBO statistics (through 1992)
- Win–loss: 124–73
- Saves: 16
- Earned run average: 3.12
- Stats at Baseball Reference

Teams
- As player: Samsung Lions (1983–1988); Lotte Giants (1989–1992); As coach: Pacific Dolphins (1993–1995); Hyundai Phoenices (1996–1997); Hyundai Unicorns (1998–2005); As manager: Hyundai Unicorns (2007); Nexen Heroes (2008–2012); Lotte Giants (2013–2014)

Career highlights and awards
- 2× KBO League Golden Glove Award winner (1985, 1987); KBO All-Star Game MVP (1985); Korean Series champion (1985)

- Kim Si-jin
- Hangul: 김시진
- Hanja: 金始眞
- RR: Gim Sijin
- MR: Kim Sijin

Kim Si-jin (Korean: 김시진; Hanja: 金始眞; born March 20, 1958, in Pohang, North Gyeongsang Province, South Korea) is a retired pitcher and a former manager in the Korea Baseball Organization.

== Playing career ==
=== Amateur career ===
Upon graduation from Daegu Commerce High School, Kim joined the Hanyang University baseball team in 1977.

In 1977, as a freshman at Hanyang University, he was selected for the South Korea national baseball team to compete the 3rd Intercontinental Cup. Kim appeared in the final game as a starting pitcher and hurled two shutout innings to lead his team to a 5–4 victory over United States.

In 1982, Kim was called up to the South Korea national baseball team for the 1982 Baseball World Cup hosted by South Korea. Kim led Team Korea to its first champion in the event, appearing two games as a starting pitcher.

==== Notable international careers ====
Year	Venue	Competition	Team
1977	Nicaragua	Intercontinental Cup	Gold medal
1978	Netherlands	Haarlem Baseball Week	Silver medal
1978	Italy	Baseball World Cup	Bronze medal
1981	Canada	Intercontinental Cup	4th
1982	South Korea	Baseball World Cup	Gold medal

=== Professional career ===
Kim was selected by the Samsung Lions in the second round of the 1983 KBO Draft. Kim finished his rookie season with a 17–12 record and a 2.55 ERA, throwing 17 complete games (runner-up in the league). He led all pitchers in shutouts (5) and was ranked third in wins, strikeouts (154), and innings pitched (229.1). After the season, Kim finished third in the Rookie of the Year voting.

Kim was 25-5 in 1985, with a 2.00 ERA and 201 strikeouts. He was the Most Valuable Player of the 1985 All-Star Game and along with fellow 25-game-winner Kim ll-young, led the Lions to the Korean Series championship. For his efforts that year he was given the Golden Glove Award for the best pitcher in the league.

In 1987 Kim went 23-6 with a 3.12 ERA and again won the Golden Glove Award.

Prior to the 1989 season, Kim and Jang Hyo-jo were traded to the Lotte Giants for Choi Dong-won and Kim Yong-chul.

== Coaching career ==
After retiring from the Lotte Giants, Kim started his coaching career as the pitching coach of Pacific Dolphins. In 1996, Dolphins were bought by Hyundai and Kim kept on coaching the Unicorns. In 2006, after manager Kim Jae-bak left the Unicorns, Kim Si-jin took his place. The club became in 2008 the Woori Heroes. He managed Lotte in 2013–2014.
