= Samsung Lions =

Professional baseball team in South Korea

- 삼성 라이온즈

| Logo | Cap insignia |

Information
- League: KBO League (1982–present)
- Location: Daegu
- Ballpark: Daegu Samsung Lions Park (2016–present); Pohang Baseball Stadium (2012–present)
- Established: 1982; 44 years ago
- Korean Series championships: 1985, 2002, 2005, 2006, 2011, 2012, 2013, 2014, 2026
- League championships: 2001, 2002, 2005, 2006, 2011, 2012, 2013, 2014, 2015
- Former ballpark: Daegu Baseball Stadium (1982–2015)
- Colors: Blue, white and grey
- Retired numbers: 10, 21, 22, 36
- Ownership: Cheil Worldwide (Samsung's subsidiary)
- Manager: Park Jin-man
- Website: www.samsunglions.com

Current uniforms
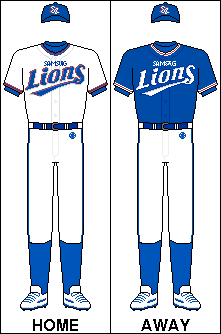

The Samsung Lions (Korean: 삼성 라이온즈) are a South Korean professional baseball club based in Daegu. Founded in 1982 as one of the original franchise members of the KBO League, the team play its home games at Daegu Samsung Lions Park.

The franchise is historically one of the most successful in the league, having won nine Korean Series championships and finished as runners-up on eleven occasions. The Lions holds the distinction of being the first in KBO League history to win four consecutive Korean Series championships (2011–2014) and secure five consecutive regular season league titles (2011–2015).

During the 1980s and 1990s, the team was closely associated with the conservative political identity of their home region of Yeongnam. As a result, they developed a rivalry with the Kia Tigers of the liberal Honam region.

== History ==
The Samsung Lions were founded in 1982 as one of the original six KBO League teams. They won their first championship in 1985, going 40-14-1 in the first half and 37-18 in the second half for a total of 77–32 for the best one-season winning percentage in KBO League history (a record that still stands). The 1985 team had two 25-game-winners on their staff, Kim Si-jin and Kim ll-young; as the Lions were winners of both half-season pennants that year, no Korean Series was held and the Lions were declared champions outright.

The Lions would also win the championship in 2002, 2005 and 2006, having the best record in each one of those years. In 2010, Ryu Jung-il was hired as the new manager of the Samsung Lions. He led the team to the best record in the league and its fifth KBO title in 2011. After the KBO League, the Samsung Lions won the Asian Series championship. The Samsung Lions became the first team to win the pennant race, the Korean Series, and the Asian Series in the same year.

In 2012, one of the most notable players on the team, Lee Seung-yuop, returned to South Korea from Japan. With his help, the Samsung Lions won their sixth championship in the 2012 season. They won another two championships in 2013 and 2014, for a total of eight Korean Series championships. In 2016, Samsung Lions moved to their new stadium, Daegu Samsung Lions Park.

== Team identity, politics and rivalry with Kia Tigers ==
The Samsung Lions, established in 1982, are closely tied to the city of Daegu and the Yeongnam region. The club emerged during a period marked by regional and political divisions in South Korea. In the years that followed, the Lions became a prominent symbol of local pride and conservative identity within Yeongnam, with their growth in the Korea Baseball Organisation reflecting the region’s economic strength, partly backed by the Samsung conglomerate. The team’s rivalry with the Kia Tigers of Gwangju has often been seen in the context of Korea’s broader regional and political divides. The Lions represent the conservative Yeongnam region, while the Tigers are based in the liberal Honam region. Throughout the 1980s and 1990s, matches between the two sides were characterised by intense fan passion and occasional unrest, mirroring deeper social and political tensions. For example, in 1986, the Korean Series between the Samsung Lions and Haitai Tigers was marked by serious fan violence. A Tigers supporter struck Lions pitcher Jin Dong-han with a thrown soju bottle in Game 1, and after later games in Daegu, Lions fans rioted, throwing bottles onto the field and setting fire to the Tigers’ team bus. Police used tear gas to control the crowds on several occasions. In 1987, the two teams met again amid rising political tension linked to South Korea's democratic transition. Although no violence occurred, the lingering memories of the previous year’s riots and the upcoming presidential election gave added significance to the series, which the Tigers won in a four-game sweep. That year, following nationwide pro-democracy protests, conservative presidential candidate Roh Tae-woo, a former general from Daegu in the Yeongnam region, announced the June 29 Declaration, agreeing to implement direct presidential elections. Roh was set to face Kim Dae-jung, a long-standing opposition figure from South Jeolla Province in the Honam region.

== Season-by-season records ==
| Season | Stadium | League | Finish | Regular season | | | | | | | | | Postseason | Awards |
| Season | Stadium | League | Finish | Rank | Games | Wins | Losses | Draws | Win% | BA | HR | ERA | Postseason | Awards |
|---|---|---|---|---|---|---|---|---|---|---|---|---|---|---|
| 1982 | Daegu Baseball Stadium | KBO | 2/6 | 2/6 | 40 | 26 | 14 | 0 | .650 | .266 | 57 | 2.70 | Lost Korean Series vs. OB Bears (1–1–4) | |
| 1982 | Daegu Baseball Stadium | KBO | 2/6 | 1/6 | 40 | 28 | 12 | 0 | .700 | .266 | 57 | 2.70 | Lost Korean Series vs. OB Bears (1–1–4) | |
| 1983 | Daegu Baseball Stadium | KBO | 4/6 | 5/6 | 50 | 21 | 26 | 3 | .447 | .263 | 90 | 3.42 | Did not qualify | Lee Man-soo (MVP) |
| 1983 | Daegu Baseball Stadium | KBO | 4/6 | 2/6 | 50 | 25 | 24 | 1 | .510 | .263 | 90 | 3.42 | Did not qualify | Lee Man-soo (MVP) |
| 1984 | Daegu Baseball Stadium | KBO | 2/6 | 1/6 | 50 | 32 | 18 | 0 | .640 | .270 | 78 | 3.35 | Lost Korean Series vs. Lotte Giants (3–4) | |
| 1984 | Daegu Baseball Stadium | KBO | 2/6 | 5/6 | 50 | 23 | 27 | 0 | .460 | .270 | 78 | 3.35 | Lost Korean Series vs. Lotte Giants (3–4) | |
| 1985 | Daegu Baseball Stadium | KBO | 1/6 | 1/6 | 55 | 40 | 14 | 1 | .741 | .276 | 97 | 2.98 | Not held (Note: The 1985 Korean Series was not played, as the Samsung Lions finished first in both parts of the regular league season and were thus declared champions outright.) | |
| 1985 | Daegu Baseball Stadium | KBO | 1/6 | 1/6 | 55 | 37 | 18 | 0 | .673 | .276 | 97 | 2.98 | Not held | |
| 1986 | Daegu Baseball Stadium | KBO | 2/7 | 1/7 | 54 | 39 | 15 | 0 | .722 | .276 | 74 | 2.95 | Won playoff vs. OB Bears (3–2); Lost Korean Series vs. Haitai Tigers (1–4) | |
| 1986 | Daegu Baseball Stadium | KBO | 2/7 | 4/7 | 54 | 31 | 22 | 1 | .585 | .276 | 74 | 2.95 | Won playoff vs. OB Bears (3–2); Lost Korean Series vs. Haitai Tigers (1–4) | |
| 1987 | Daegu Baseball Stadium | KBO | 2/7 | 1/7 | 54 | 33 | 21 | 0 | .611 | .300 | 105 | 3.58 | Lost Korean Series vs. Haitai Tigers (0–4) | Jang Hyo-jo (MVP) |
| 1987 | Daegu Baseball Stadium | KBO | 2/7 | 1/7 | 54 | 31 | 23 | 0 | .444 | .300 | 105 | 3.58 | Lost Korean Series vs. Haitai Tigers (0–4) | Jang Hyo-jo (MVP) |
| 1988 | Daegu Baseball Stadium | KBO | 3/7 | 5/7 | 54 | 23 | 30 | 1 | .435 | .278 | 85 | 4.18 | Lost playoff vs. Binggrae Eagles (0–3) | |
| 1988 | Daegu Baseball Stadium | KBO | 3/7 | 2/7 | 54 | 33 | 20 | 1 | .620 | .278 | 85 | 4.18 | Lost playoff vs. Binggrae Eagles (0–3) | |
| 1989 | Daegu Baseball Stadium | KBO | 4/7 | | 120 | 57 | 58 | 5 | .496 | .272 | 96 | 4.42 | Did not qualify | |
| 1990 | Daegu Baseball Stadium | KBO | 2/7 | 2/7 | 120 | 66 | 52 | 2 | .558 | .263 | 131 | 4.13 | Won semi-playoff vs. Binggrae Eagles (2–0); Won playoff vs. Haitai Tigers (3–0); Lost Korean Series vs. LG Twins (0–4) | |
| 1991 | Daegu Baseball Stadium | KBO | 3/8 | 3/8 | 126 | 70 | 55 | 1 | .560 | .272 | 108 | 4.23 | Won semi-playoff vs. Lotte Giants (2–1–1); Lost playoff vs. Binggrae Eagles (1–3) | |
| 1992 | Daegu Baseball Stadium | KBO | 4/8 | 4/8 | 126 | 67 | 57 | 2 | .540 | .265 | 124 | 4.55 | Lost semi-playoff vs. Lotte Giants (0–2) | |
| 1993 | Daegu Baseball Stadium | KBO | 2/8 | 2/8 | 126 | 73 | 48 | 5 | .599 | .268 | 133 | 2.95 | Won playoff vs. LG Twins (3–2); Lost Korean Series vs. Haitai Tigers (2–1–4) | Kim Seong-rae (MVP); Yang Joon-hyuk (ROTY) |
| 1994 | Daegu Baseball Stadium | KBO | 5/8 | | 126 | 60 | 64 | 2 | .484 | .260 | 106 | 3.47 | Did not qualify | |
| 1995 | Daegu Baseball Stadium | KBO | 5/8 | | 126 | 60 | 60 | 6 | .500 | .250 | 94 | 3.90 | Did not qualify | Lee Dong-su (ROTY) |
| 1996 | Daegu Baseball Stadium | KBO | 6/8 | | 126 | 54 | 67 | 5 | .448 | .249 | 88 | 4.23 | Did not qualify | |
| 1997 | Daegu Baseball Stadium | KBO | 3/8 | 4/8 | 126 | 66 | 53 | 7 | .552 | .277 | 165 | 4.23 | Won semi-playoff vs. Ssangbangwool Raiders (2–1); Lost playoff vs. LG Twins (2–3) | Lee Seung-yuop (MVP) |
| 1998 | Daegu Baseball Stadium | KBO | 3/8 | 2/8 | 126 | 66 | 58 | 2 | .532 | .268 | 143 | 4.32 | Lost playoff vs. LG Twins (1–3) | |
| 1999 | Daegu Baseball Stadium | Magic League | 4/8 | 1/4 | 132 | 73 | 57 | 2 | .562 | .273 | 207 | 5.16 | Lost playoff vs. Lotte Giants (3–4) | Lee Seung-yuop (MVP) |
| 2000 | Daegu Baseball Stadium | Dream League | 3/8 | 3/4 | 133 | 69 | 59 | 5 | .539 | .269 | 177 | 4.64 | Lost playoff vs. Hyundai Unicorns (0–4) | |
| 2001 | Daegu Baseball Stadium | KBO | 2/8 | 1/8 | 133 | 81 | 52 | 0 | .609 | .277 | 162 | 4.39 | Lost Korean Series vs. Doosan Bears (2–4) | Lee Seung-yuop (MVP) |
| 2002 | Daegu Baseball Stadium | KBO | 1/8 | 1/8 | 133 | 82 | 47 | 4 | .636 | .284 | 191 | 3.92 | Won Korean Series vs. LG Twins (4–2) | Lee Seung-yuop (MVP) |
| 2003 | Daegu Baseball Stadium | KBO | 4/8 | 3/8 | 133 | 76 | 53 | 4 | .589 | .284 | 213 | 4.37 | Lost semi-playoff vs. SK Wyverns (0–2) | Lee Seung-yuop (MVP) |
| 2004 | Daegu Baseball Stadium | KBO | 2/8 | 2/8 | 133 | 73 | 52 | 8 | .584 | .269 | 132 | 3.76 | Won playoff vs. Doosan Bears (3–1); Lost Korean Series vs. Hyundai Unicorns (2–3–4) | Bae Young-soo (MVP) |
| 2005 | Daegu Baseball Stadium | KBO | 1/8 | 1/8 | 126 | 74 | 48 | 4 | .607 | .268 | 111 | 3.83 | Won Korean Series vs. Doosan Bears (4–0) | Oh Seung-hwan (ROTY) |
| 2006 | Daegu Baseball Stadium | KBO | 1/8 | 1/8 | 126 | 73 | 50 | 3 | .593 | .255 | 73 | 3.33 | Won Korean Series vs. Hanwha Eagles (4–1–1) | |
| 2007 | Daegu Baseball Stadium | KBO | 4/8 | 4/8 | 126 | 62 | 60 | 4 | .508 | .254 | 86 | 3.71 | Lost semi-playoff vs. Hanwha Eagles (1–2) | |
| 2008 | Daegu Baseball Stadium | KBO | 4/8 | 4/8 | 126 | 65 | 61 | 0 | .516 | .258 | 92 | 4.42 | Won semi-playoff vs. Lotte Giants (3–0); Lost playoff vs. Doosan Bears (2–4) | Choi Hyoung-woo (ROTY) |
| 2009 | Daegu Baseball Stadium | KBO | 5/8 | | 133 | 64 | 69 | 0 | .481 | .275 | 146 | 4.98 | Did not qualify | |
| 2010 | Daegu Baseball Stadium | KBO | 2/8 | 2/8 | 133 | 79 | 52 | 2 | .594 | .272 | 118 | 3.94 | Won playoff vs. Doosan Bears (3–2); Lost Korean Series vs. SK Wyverns (0–4) | |
| 2011 | Daegu Baseball Stadium | KBO | 1/8 | 1/8 | 133 | 79 | 50 | 4 | .612 | .259 | 95 | 3.35 | Won Korean Series vs. SK Wyverns (4–1) | Bae Young-seop (ROTY) |
| 2012 | Daegu Baseball Stadium | KBO | 1/8 | 1/8 | 133 | 80 | 51 | 2 | .611 | .272 | 89 | 3.44 | Won Korean Series vs. SK Wyverns (4–2) | |
| 2013 | Daegu Baseball Stadium | KBO | 1/9 | 1/9 | 128 | 75 | 51 | 2 | .595 | .283 | 113 | 3.99 | Won Korean Series vs. Doosan Bears (4–3) | |
| 2014 | Daegu Baseball Stadium | KBO | 1/9 | 1/9 | 128 | 78 | 47 | 3 | .624 | .301 | 161 | 4.52 | Won Korean Series vs. Nexen Heroes (4–2) | |
| 2015 | Daegu Baseball Stadium | KBO | 2/10 | 1/10 | 144 | 88 | 56 | 0 | .611 | .302 | 176 | 4.70 | Lost Korean Series vs. Doosan Bears (1–4) | Koo Ja-wook (ROTY) |
| 2016 | Daegu Samsung Lions Park | KBO | 9/10 | | 144 | 65 | 78 | 1 | .455 | .293 | 142 | 5.65 | Did not qualify | |
| 2017 | Daegu Samsung Lions Park | KBO | 9/10 | | 144 | 55 | 84 | 5 | .396 | .280 | 145 | 5.90 | Did not qualify | |
| 2018 | Daegu Samsung Lions Park | KBO | 6/10 | | 144 | 68 | 72 | 4 | .486 | .288 | 146 | 5.19 | Did not qualify | |
| 2019 | Daegu Samsung Lions Park | KBO | 8/10 | | 144 | 60 | 83 | 1 | .420 | .256 | 122 | 4.64 | Did not qualify | |
| 2020 | Daegu Samsung Lions Park | KBO | 8/10 | | 144 | 64 | 75 | 5 | .460 | .268 | 129 | 4.78 | Did not qualify | |
| 2021 | Daegu Samsung Lions Park | KBO | 3/10 | 2/10 | 144 | 76 | 59 | 9 | .563 | .267 | 133 | 4.30 | Lost playoff vs. Doosan Bears (0–2) | |
| 2022 | Daegu Samsung Lions Park | KBO | 7/10 | | 144 | 66 | 76 | 2 | .465 | .270 | 103 | 4.29 | Did not qualify | |
| 2023 | Daegu Samsung Lions Park | KBO | 8/10 | | 144 | 61 | 82 | 1 | .427 | .263 | 88 | 4.60 | Did not qualify | |
| 2024 | Daegu Samsung Lions Park | KBO | 2/10 | 2/10 | 144 | 78 | 64 | 2 | .549 | .269 | 185 | 4.68 | Won playoff vs. LG Twins (3–1); Lost Korean Series vs. Kia Tigers (1–4) | |
| 2025 | Daegu Samsung Lions Park | KBO | 4/10 | 4/10 | 144 | 74 | 68 | 2 | .521 | .271 | 161 | 4.12 | Won wild card vs. NC Dinos (1–1); Won semi-playoff vs. SSG Landers (3–1); Lost playoff vs. Hanwha Eagles (2–3) | |
| 2026 | Daegu Samsung Lions Park | KBO | 1/10 | 2/10 | 144 | 83 | 58 | 3 | .589 | .273 | 140 | 4.31 | Won playoff vs. Kia Tigers (3–2); Won Korean Series vs. KT Wiz (4–1) | |

== Team ==
=== Korean Baseball League MVP ===
- 1983: Lee Man-soo (catcher)
- 1987: Jang Hyo-jo (outfielder)
- 1993: Kim Seong-rae (infielder)
- 1997, 1999, 2001, 2002, 2003: Lee Seung-yuop (infielder)
- 2004: Bae Young-soo (pitcher)

=== Player records ===
==== Batting average ====
1983 Jang Hyo-jo AVG .369
1984 Lee Man-soo AVG .340
1985 Jang Hyo-jo AVG .373
1986 Jang Hyo-jo AVG .329
1987 Jang Hyo-jo AVG .387
1993 Yang Joon-hyuk AVG .341
1996 Yang Joon-hyuk AVG .346
1998 Yang Joon-hyuk AVG .342
2026 Koo Ja-wook AVG .371

==== Home runs ====
1983 Lee Man-soo 27 HR
1984 Lee Man-soo 23 HR
1985 Lee Man-soo 22 HR
1987 Kim Seong-rae 22 HR
1993 Kim Seong-rae 28 HR
1997 Lee Seung-yuop 32 HR
1999 Lee Seung-yuop 54 HR
2001 Lee Seung-yuop 39 HR
2002 Lee Seung-yuop 47 HR
2003 Lee Seung-yuop 56 HR
2007 Shim Jeong-soo 31 HR
2011 Choi Hyoung-woo 30 HR
2025 Lewin Díaz 50 HR

== Retired numbers ==
The first number retired by the Samsung Lions organization was number 22, in honour of catcher and slugger Lee Man-soo, who played for the team from 1982 to 1997, and was later a coach with the Chicago White Sox of the MLB and the SK Wyverns. Lee was a five-time KBO League Golden Glove Award-winner with the Lions, won the KBO League MVP in 1983, and the hitting Triple Crown in 1984. The second number retired by the Samsung Lions organization was number 10, in honour of left-handed batter Yang Joon-hyuk, who played for the team from 1993 to 1998 and from 2002 to 2010. Yang led the league in batting four times, and holds six career batting records (including at one time the home run record with 351, now surpassed by Lee Seung-yeop). The third retired number, 36, was retired in honour of Lee Seung-yuop, who has spent 15 seasons with the club and is the all-time KBO League leader in home runs with 467. Lee also holds the KBO records for runs scored, RBIs, total bases, slugging percentage, and OPS. At the end of the 2025 season, number 21 of Seung-hwan Oh, a closer who has saved 427 games in KBO and 122 games in NPB and MLB, was retired.

| Yang Joon-hyuk; RF, DH | Lee Man-soo; C | Lee Seung-yuop; IF |

== Managers ==
- Seo Young-moo (1982–1983)
- Lee Chung-nam (1983)
- Kim Yeong-duk (1984–1986)
- Jeong Dong-jin (1986) (caretaker)
- Park Young-gil (1987–1988)
- Jeong Dong-jin (1989–1990)
- Kim Sung-keun (1991–1992)
- Woo Yong-deuk (1993–1995)
- Baek In-chun (1996–1997)
- Cho Chang-soo (1997) (caretaker)
- Seo Jeong-hwan (1998–1999)
- Kim Yong-hee (2000)
- Kim Eung-ryong (2001–2004)
- Sun Dong-yol (2005–2010)
- Ryu Joong-il (2011–2016)
- Kim Han-soo (2017–2019)
- Heo Sam-young (2020–2022)
- Park Jin-man (2022–present)
