= 2017 KBO League season =

2017 KBO League
- League: KBO League
- Sport: Baseball
- Duration: March 31 – October 3
- Games: 144 per team
- Teams: 10
- Total attendance: 8,400,688

Regular Season
- Season champions: Kia Tigers
- Season MVP: Yang Hyeon-jong (Kia)

Postseason
- Wild Card champions: NC Dinos
- Wild Card runners-up: SK Wyverns
- Semi-playoffs champions: NC Dinos
- Semi-playoffs runners-up: Lotte Giants
- Playoffs champions: Doosan Bears
- Playoffs runners-up: NC Dinos

Korean Series
- Champions: Kia Tigers
- Runners-up: Doosan Bears
- Finals MVP: Yang Hyeon-jong (Kia)

KBO League seasons
- ← 2016 2018 →

The 2017 KBO League season was the 36th season in the history of the KBO League.

== Standings ==
Rank	Team	W	L	D	Pct.	GB	Postseason
1	KIA Tigers	87	56	1	.608	--	Korean Series
2	Doosan Bears	84	57	3	.596	2.0	Playoff
3	Lotte Giants	80	62	2	.563	6.5	Semi-playoff
4	NC Dinos	79	62	3	.560	7.0	Wild Card
5	SK Wyverns	75	68	1	.524	12.0	Wild Card
6	LG Twins	69	72	3	.489	17.0	Did not qualify
7	Nexen Heroes	69	73	2	.486	17.5	Did not qualify
8	Hanwha Eagles	61	81	2	.430	25.5	Did not qualify
9	Samsung Lions	55	84	5	.396	30.0	Did not qualify
10	KT Wiz	50	94	0	.347	37.5	Did not qualify

== League Leaders ==
Batting leaders
Stat	Player	Team	Total
Batting average	Kim Sun-bin	KIA Tigers	.370
Home runs	Choi Jeong	SK Wyverns	46
Runs batted in	Darin Ruf	Samsung Lions	124
Runs	Roger Bernadina	KIA Tigers	118
Hits	Son Ah-seop	Lotte Giants	192
Stolen Base	Park Hae-min	Samsung Lions	40
On Base Percentage	Choi Hyung-woo	KIA Tigers	.450
Slugging Percentage	Choi Jeong	SK Wyverns	.684

Pitching leaders
Stat	Player	Team	Total
Earned run average	Ryan Feierabend	kt Wiz	3.04
Wins	Yang Hyeon-jong; Hector Noesi	KIA Tigers; KIA Tigers	20
Saves	Son Seung-lak	Lotte Giants	37
Holds	Jin Hae-soo	LG Twins	24
Innings Pitched	Hector Noesi	KIA Tigers	201.2
Winning percentage	Hector Noesi	KIA Tigers	.800
Strikeouts	Merrill Kelly	SK Wyverns	189
WHIP	Ryan Feierabend	kt Wiz	1.15

== Foreign players ==
Each team can sign up to three foreign players. Due to the high proportion of pitchers signed in previous years, beginning in 2014 the league has mandated that at least one of the foreign players must be a position player.

Team	Player	Position	In KBO since	Salary	Notes
Samsung Lions	Anthony Ranaudo	Pitcher	2017	$1,050,000	
Samsung Lions	Zach Petrick	Pitcher	2017	$450,000	
Samsung Lions	Darin Ruf	Infielder	2017	$1,100,000	
NC Dinos	Jeff Manship	Pitcher	2017	$1,600,000	
NC Dinos	Eric Hacker	Pitcher	2014	$600,000	
NC Dinos	Xavier Scruggs	Infielder	2017	$700,000	
Doosan Bears	Dustin Nippert	Pitcher	2011	$2,100,000	KBO All-Star
Doosan Bears	Michael Bowden	Pitcher	2016	$1,100,000	
Doosan Bears	Nick Evans	Infielder	2016	$680,000	KBO All-Star
Nexen Heroes	Sean O'Sullivan	Pitcher	2017	$1,100,000	Released
Nexen Heroes	Andy Van Hekken	Pitcher	2016	$900,000	
Nexen Heroes	Danny Dorn	Outfielder	2016	$650,000	Released
Nexen Heroes	Jake Brigham	Pitcher	2017	$500,000	Signed to replace Sean O'Sullivan
Nexen Heroes	Michael Choice	Outfielder	2017	$200,000	Signed to replace Danny Dorn
SK Wyverns	Merrill Kelly	Pitcher	2015	$850,000	KBO All-Star
SK Wyverns	Scott Diamond	Pitcher	2017	$600,000	
SK Wyverns	Danny Worth	Infielder	2017	$700,000	Released
SK Wyverns	Jamie Romak	Infielder	2017	$500,000	Signed to replace Danny Worth
Hanwha Eagles	Alexi Ogando	Pitcher	2017	$1,300,000	
Hanwha Eagles	Carlos Villanueva	Pitcher	2017	$1,000,000	
Hanwha Eagles	Wilin Rosario	Infielder	2016	$1,500,000	KBO All-Star
Kia Tigers	Héctor Noesí	Pitcher	2016	$1,700,000	
Kia Tigers	Pat Dean	Pitcher	2017	$700,000	
Kia Tigers	Roger Bernadina	Outfielder	2017	$750,000	KBO All-Star
Lotte Giants	Nick Additon	Pitcher	2017	$350,000	
Lotte Giants	Brooks Raley	Pitcher	2015	$850,000	KBO All-Star
Lotte Giants	Parker Markel	Pitcher	2017	$500,000	
Lotte Giants	Andy Burns	Infielder	2017	$600,000	
LG Twins	Henry Sosa	Pitcher	2012	$500,000	
LG Twins	Luis Jimenez	Infielder	2015	$700,000	Released
LG Twins	David Huff	Pitcher	2016	$1,000,000	
LG Twins	James Loney	Infielder	2016	$250,000	signed to replace Luis Jimenez
KT Wiz	Ryan Feierabend	Pitcher	2015	$350,000	KBO All-Star
KT Wiz	Donn Roach	Pitcher	2017	$650,000	
KT Wiz	Johnny Monell	Infielder	2017	$450,000	Released

=== Foreign hitters ===
Team	Player	Batting average	Home runs	RBI	Notes
Doosan Bears	Nick Evans	.297	26	90	KBO All-Star
Hanwha Eagles	Wilin Rosario	.339	37	111	KBO All-Star
Kia Tigers	Roger Bernadina	.320	27	111	32 stolen bases; KBO All-Star, KBO runs scored leader, Golden Glove Award
KT Wiz	Mel Rojas Jr.	.301	18	56	
LG Twins	Luis Jiménez	.276	7	30	
Lotte Giants	Andy Burns	.303	15	57	
NC Dinos	Xavier Scruggs	.300	35	111	
Nexen Heroes	Danny Dorn	.140	1	2	Released by the team
Nexen Heroes	Michael Choice	.307	17	42	Signed to replace Danny Dorn
Samsung Lions	Darin Ruf	.315	31	124	KBO RBI leader
SK Wyverns	Danny Worth	.111	0	0	Released by the team
SK Wyverns	Jamie Romak	.242	31	64	Signed to replace Danny Worth

== Postseason ==
Wild Card
4	NC Dinos	2
5	SK Wyverns	0

Semi-playoff
3	Lotte Giants	2
4	NC Dinos	3

Playoff
2	Doosan Bears	3
4	NC Dinos	1

Korean Series
1	KIA Tigers	4
2	Doosan Bears	1

=== Wild Card ===
The series started with a 1–0 advantage for the fourth-placed team.

NC Dinos won the series, 2–0.

Game	Date	Score	Location	Time	Attendance
1	October 5	SK Wyverns 5 – NC Dinos 10	Masan Baseball Stadium	3:44	9,926

=== Semi-playoff ===
NC Dinos won the series, 3–2.

Game	Date	Score	Location	Time	Attendance
1	October 8	NC Dinos 9 – Lotte Giants 2 (11)	Busan Sajik Baseball Stadium	4:45	26,000
2	October 9	NC Dinos 0 – Lotte Giants 1	Busan Sajik Baseball Stadium	3:17	25,169
3	October 11	Lotte Giants 6 – NC Dinos 13	Masan Baseball Stadium	4:04	11,000
4	October 13	Lotte Giants 7 – NC Dinos 1	Masan Baseball Stadium	2:47	11,000
5	October 15	NC Dinos 9 – Lotte Giants 0	Busan Sajik Baseball Stadium	3:59	25,938

=== Playoff ===
Doosan Bears won the series, 3–1.

Game	Date	Score	Location	Time	Attendance
1	October 17	NC Dinos 13 – Doosan Bears 5	Jamsil Baseball Stadium	3:56	24,354
2	October 18	NC Dinos 7 - Doosan Bears 17	Jamsil Baseball Stadium	4:02	23,037
3	October 20	Doosan Bears 14 – NC Dinos 3	Masan Baseball Stadium	3:55	11,000
4	October 21	Doosan Bears 14 – NC Dinos 5	Masan Baseball Stadium	3:53	11,000

=== Korean Series ===
Kia Tigers won the series, 4–1.

Game	Date	Score	Location	Time	Attendance
1	October 25	Doosan Bears 5 – Kia Tigers 3	Gwangju-Kia Champions Field	3:35	19,600
2	October 26	Doosan Bears 0 – Kia Tigers 1	Gwangju-Kia Champions Field	3:16	19,600
3	October 28	Kia Tigers 6 – Doosan Bears 3	Jamsil Baseball Stadium	3:16	25,000
4	October 29	Kia Tigers 5 – Doosan Bears 1	Jamsil Baseball Stadium	3:33	25,000
5	October 30	KIA Tigers 7 – Doosan Bears 6	Jamsil Baseball Stadium	4:09	25,000

== Attendances ==
Team	Total attendance	Home average	Change vs. 2016
Doosan Bears	1,094,829	15,206	–6 %
LG Twins	1,134,836	15,762	–2 %
SK Wyverns	892,541	12,396	+3.2%
Lotte Giants	1,038,492	14,424	+21.8%
Samsung Lions	704,857	9,790	–17.2 %
Nexen Heroes	699,380	9,714	–10.6 %
KIA Tigers	1,024,830	14,234	+32.5%
KT Wiz	686,541	9,535	+0.6%
Hanwha Eagles	593,251	8,240	–10.2 %
NC Dinos	531,121	7,377	–3.3 %
Total	8,400,688	11,668	+0.7 %
