= 2017 Korean Series =

Team (Wins)	Managers	Season
Kia Tigers (4)	Kim Ki-tae	87–56–1
Doosan Bears (1)	Kim Tae-hyoung	84–57–3
- Dates: October 25–30
- MVP: Yang Hyeon-jong

The 2017 Korean Series was the championship series of the 2017 KBO League season. The Kia Tigers, as the regular season champions, automatically advanced to the Korean Series. They played the winner of the playoff series, the Doosan Bears, who had defeated the NC Dinos in the playoff. Kia won the best-of-seven series, 4–1. Yang Hyeon-jong was named the series' most valuable player

== Summary ==
Kia won the series, 4–1.

Game	Date	Score	Location	Time	Attendance
1	October 25	Doosan Bears 5 – Kia Tigers 3	Gwangju-Kia Champions Field	18:30	19,600
2	October 26	Doosan Bears 0 – Kia Tigers 1	Gwangju-Kia Champions Field	18:30	19,600
3	October 28	Kia Tigers 6 – Doosan Bears 3	Jamsil Baseball Stadium	14:00	25,000
4	October 29	Kia Tigers 5 – Doosan Bears 1	Jamsil Baseball Stadium	14:00	25,000
5	October 30	Kia Tigers 7 – Doosan Bears 6	Jamsil Baseball Stadium	18:30	25,000

== Matchups ==
=== Game 1 ===
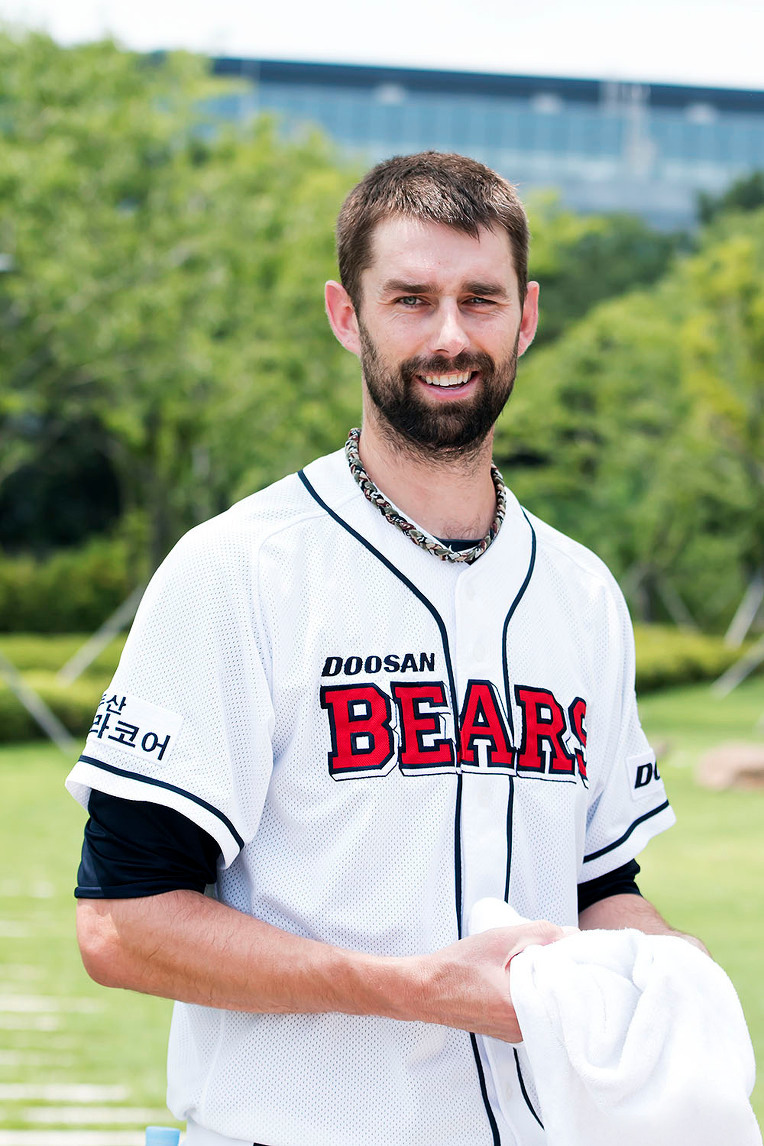
Dustin Nippert won Game 1 for Doosan.

October 25 18:30 KST at Gwangju-Kia Champions Field
Team	1	2	3	4	5	6	7	8	9	R	H	E
Doosan Bears	0	0	0	1	4	0	0	0	0	5	7	1
Kia Tigers	0	0	0	0	3	0	0	0	0	3	6	1
WP: Dustin Nippert (1–0) LP: Héctor Noesí (0–1) Sv: Kim Kang-ryul (1); Home runs: DOO: Kim Jae-hwan (1), Oh Jae-il (1); KIA: Roger Bernadina (1); Boxscore

Moon Jae-in, the President of South Korea, threw the ceremonial first pitch. Dustin Nippert started Game 1 for Doosan and Héctor Noesí started for Kia. Oh Jae-won drew a walk with the bases loaded in the fourth inning to score Doosan's first run. In the fifth inning, Park Kun-woo hit a run batted in (RBI) single, and Kim Jae-hwan and Oh Jae-il hit back-to-back home runs for Doosan in the fifth inning. In their half of the fifth inning, Roger Bernadina hit a three-run home run for Kia, and Doosan held on to win 5–3.

=== Game 2 ===
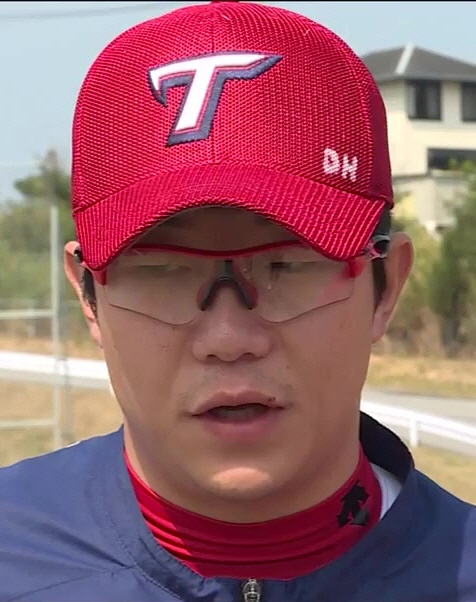
Yang Hyeon-jong pitched a complete game shutout for Kia in Game 2.

October 26 18:30 KST at Gwangju-Kia Champions Field
Team	1	2	3	4	5	6	7	8	9	R	H	E
Doosan Bears	0	0	0	0	0	0	0	0	0	0	4	1
Kia Tigers	0	0	0	0	0	0	0	1	X	1	5	0
WP: Yang Hyeon-jong (1–0) LP: Ham Deok-ju (0–1); Boxscore

Yang Hyeon-jong started Game 2 for the Tigers, while Chang Won-jun started for the Bears. Yang threw a complete game shutout, allowing four hits and recording 11 strikeouts. Kim Joo-chan scored the game's only run in the eighth inning after hitting a double.

=== Game 3 ===
October 28 14:00 KST at Jamsil Baseball Stadium
Team	1	2	3	4	5	6	7	8	9	R	H	E
Kia Tigers	0	0	1	2	1	0	0	0	2	6	9	0
Doosan Bears	0	0	0	1	0	0	1	1	0	3	7	0
WP: Pat Dean (1-0) LP: Michael Bowden (0-1) Sv: Kim Se-hyun (1); Home runs: KIA: Na Ji-wan (1); DOO: Nick Evans (1); Boxscore

Pat Dean threw seven innings for Kia. He pitched aggressively, inducing weak contact from Doosan's hitters. Lee Myung-ki hit an RBI double in the third inning to give Kia a 1–0 lead, and An Chi-hong hit a two RBI single in the fourth inning to increase the lead to 3–0. The Bears scored in the bottom of the fourth inning with a sacrifice fly by Yang Eui-ji, but the Tigers scored again in the fifth inning with an RBI single by Bernadina. Nick Evans hit a home run for the Bears in the seventh inning and Kim Jae-hwan had an RBI for the Bears in the eighth inning to narrow the score to 4–3. Na Ji-wan entered the game as a pinch hitter for Kia in the ninth inning, and hit a two-run home run.

=== Game 4 ===
October 29 14:00 KST at Jamsil Baseball Stadium
Team	1	2	3	4	5	6	7	8	9	R	H	E
Kia Tigers	2	0	0	0	0	0	2	0	1	5	9	1
Doosan Bears	0	0	0	0	0	0	0	1	0	1	9	3
WP: Im Gi-yeong (1-0) LP: Yoo Hee-kwan (0-1) Sv: Kim Se-hyun (2); Boxscore

Im Gi-yeong started for the Tigers, and Yoo Hee-kwan started for the Bears. Bernadina hit an RBI triple in the first inning for Kia, and scored on a single by Choi Hyung-woo. The Tigers scored two more runs in the seventh inning. The Bears scored a run in the eighth inning, but Kia scored a run in the top of the ninth inning. Kim Se-hyun earned his second save of the series for the Tigers, pitching the final 1 1/3 innings.

=== Game 5 ===
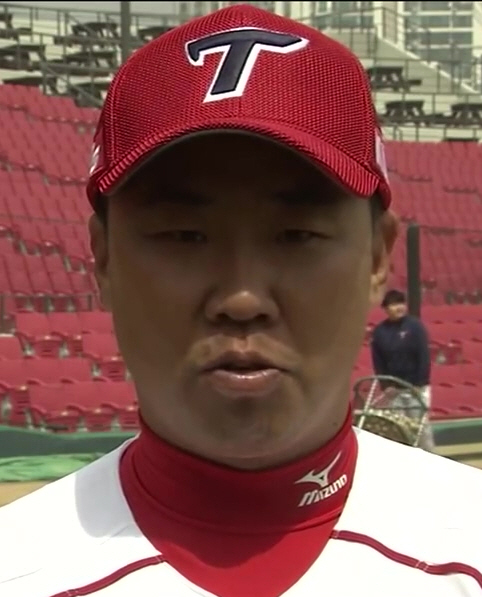
Lee Bum-ho hit a grand slam for Kia in Game 5.

October 30 18:30 KST at Jamsil Baseball Stadium
Team	1	2	3	4	5	6	7	8	9	R	H	E
Kia Tigers	0	0	5	0	0	2	0	0	0	7	10	1
Doosan Bears	0	0	0	0	0	0	6	0	0	6	11	2
WP: Héctor Noesí (1-1) LP: Dustin Nippert (1-1) Sv: Yang Hyeon-jong (1); Home runs: KIA: Lee Bum-ho (1); DOO: None; Boxscore

Game 5 was a rematch of Game 1's starting pitchers, Noesí for Kia and Nippert for Doosan. Lee Bum-ho hit a grand slam for Kia off of Nippert in the third inning. Yang Hyeon-jong earned the save, pitching out of a bases loaded situation in the ninth inning. Kia won their first Korean Series since 2009. Yang won the Korean Series Most Valuable Player Award.

== See also ==
- 2017 Japan Series
- 2017 World Series
