= Jin (Korean surname) =

- Hangul: 진
- Hanja: 陳; 晉; 秦; 眞
- RR: Jin
- MR: Chin

Jin or Chin (진) is the romanization of a number of Korean surnames, written as 陳, 秦, 眞, or 晉 in hanja.

While some earliest figures of the surname date back to the Korean Kingdom of Baekjae and Silla, other figures include the early Chinese who immigrated to Korea during the era of Goryeo dynasty.

Similar to the Korean surname Jin, the Chinese surnames Chen and Qin also use the Chinese characters 陳 and 秦.

== Notable people ==
- Jin Bo-ra (stage name Sunday, born 1987), South Korean singer and musical actress
- Jin Bora (born 1987), South Korean pianist and composer
- Jin Chae-seon (1842–?), Korean pansori singer
- Jin Chang-soo (born 1985), South Korean footballer
- Jin Chang-uk (born 1972), South Korean volleyball player
- Jin Dae-je (born 1952), South Korean businessman and former politician
- Jin Dae-sung (born 1989), South Korean football player
- Jin Deok-san (born 1972), South Korean former field hockey player, Olympic silver medalist
- Jin Eun-young (born 1970), South Korean poet and philosopher
- Jin Goo (born 1980), South Korean actor
- Jin Hae-soo (born 1986), South Korean professional baseball player
- Jin Hee-kyung (born 1968), South Korean actress
- Jin Ho-eun (born 2000), South Korean actor
- Jin Ho-jun (born 2002), South Korean taekwondo practitioner
- Jin Hwan (1913–1951), Korean painter
- Kidoh (born Jin Hyo-sang, 1992), South Korean musician
- Jin Hyuk, South Korean television director
- Jin Ji-hee (born 1999), South Korean actress
- Jin Jong-oh (born 1979), South Korean sports shooter, Olympic gold medalist
- Jin Jun-tak (born 1949), South Korean former volleyball player
- Chin Jung-kwon (born 1963), South Korean critic and professor
- Jin Kab-yong (born 1974), South Korean retired baseball player
- Jin Ki-joo (born 1989), South Korean actress
- Jin Kyung (born 1972), South Korean actress
- Jin Mi-jung (born 1978), South Korean basketball player
- Jin Min-sub (born 1992), South Korean pole vaulter
- Jin Mo-young (born 1970), South Korean documentary filmmaker
- Jin Sang-houn (born 1986), South Korean volleyball player
- Jin Sun-Kyu (born 1977), South Korean actor
- Jin Seong-uk (born 1993), South Korean footballer
- Jin So-yeon (born 1991), South Korean actress and model
- Jin Soon-jin (born 1974), South Korean retired football player
- Jin Sun-kuk (born 1970), South Korean former track and field sprinter
- Jin Sun-mee (born 1967), South Korean politician
- Jin Sun-ryeong (born 1971), South Korean sports shooter
- Jin Sun-yu (born 1988), South Korean speed skater
- Chin Unsuk (born 1961), South Korean composer
- Jin Ye-sol (born 1985), South Korean actress
- Chin Young (born 1950), South Korean politician
- Jin Yun-seong (born 1995), South Korean weightlifter
