= Barret Loux =

American baseball player (born 1989)

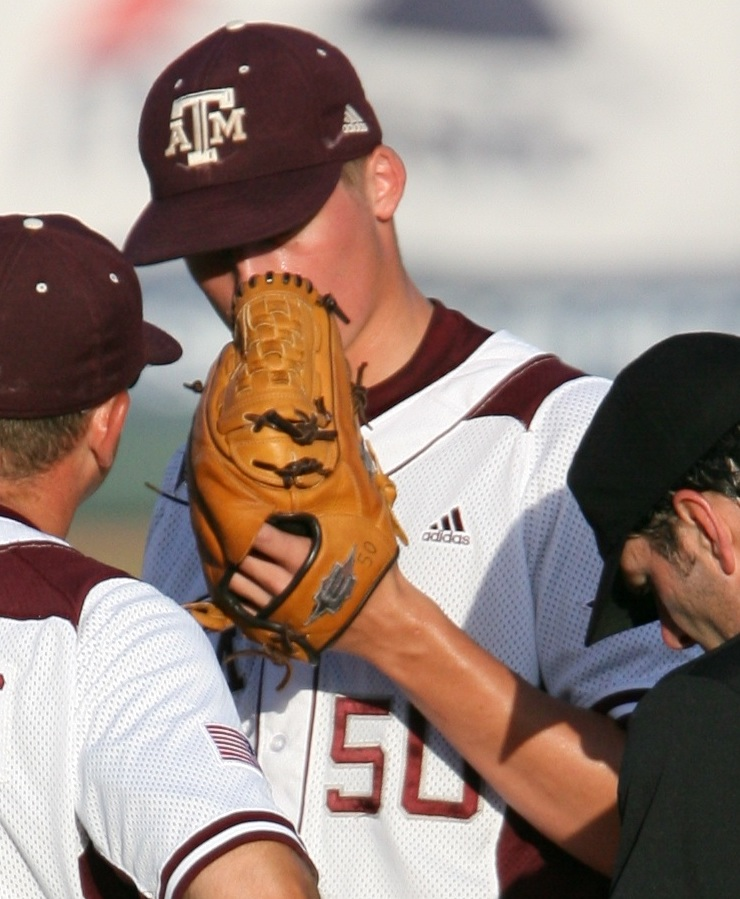
- Loux with Texas A&M in 2008
- Pitcher
- Born: April 6, 1989 (age 36); Houston, Texas, U.S.
- Bats: Right Throws: Right

Barret Christopher Loux (born April 6, 1989) is an American former professional baseball pitcher.

After Loux attended Stratford High School and Texas A&M University, the Arizona Diamondbacks drafted Loux with the sixth overall selection in the Major League Baseball (MLB) 2010 draft. Arizona opted not to sign Loux, due to injury concerns with the shoulder and elbow of his pitching arm. Due to his unique situation, MLB declared Loux a free agent, and he signed with the Texas Rangers. The Rangers later traded Loux to the Chicago Cubs, and he last pitched professionally in 2016, in an independent baseball league.

== Amateur career ==
Loux attended Stratford High School in Houston, Texas, where he played for the school's baseball team. While pitching for Stratford, Loux dealt with arm injuries. He discovered stretching exercises that increased his strength and flexibility.

After his senior season at Stratford, he participated in a scouting combine and all-star games sponsored by the Houston Area Baseball Coaches Association. Out of high school, the Detroit Tigers selected Loux in the 24th round of the 2007 MLB draft. While the Tigers made Loux a strong offer, he did not sign, opting to play college baseball for the Texas A&M Aggies baseball team in the Big 12 Conference of the National Collegiate Athletic Association's (NCAA) Division I.

In 2008, as a true freshman, Loux had an 8–2 win–loss record and led Texas A&M in strikeouts with 81. Loux was named a Second Team NCAA Division I Freshman All-American starting pitcher. As a sophomore, Loux pitched to a 3–3 record with 62 strikeouts. He was named a Second Team Academic All-Big 12 pitcher. After the season, Loux had elbow surgery.

In his junior season, Loux routinely started on Friday nights, traditionally the night when a team's ace pitcher appears. He pitched to an 11–2 win–loss record with a 2.83 earned run average (ERA), while leading the Big 12 Conference with 136 strikeouts. He was named the Big 12 Conference Pitcher of the Week for the weeks ending on March 8 and May 17. He was named a First Team NCAA Division I All-American by Baseball America, a Third Team All-American by the American Baseball Coaches Association, and a Big 12 Conference All-Star starting pitcher. He was also named a semifinalist for the Golden Spikes Award, given to the top amateur baseball player in the United States.

== Professional career ==
=== Arizona Diamondbacks ===
Heading into the 2010 MLB draft, Loux was seen as a potential late-first round pick. Surprising many, the Arizona Diamondbacks drafted Loux with the sixth overall selection, agreeing to a pre-draft deal with Loux with a $2 million signing bonus. However, Loux failed his physical with the Diamondbacks due to a torn labrum and elbow damage that doctors felt might require ligament replacement surgery in the future. As a result, the Diamondbacks did not offer Loux a contract, as the franchise chose to take advantage of compensation rules that instead would grant them the seventh overall pick in the 2011 MLB draft if they did not sign Loux.

=== Texas Rangers ===
Though unsigned draft picks typically cannot begin their professional careers until the next season, MLB declared Loux a free agent in an unprecedented move. After throwing for scouts, Loux signed a contract with the Texas Rangers, receiving a signing bonus of $312,000. In an attempt to prevent this situation from happening again, the new collective bargaining agreement negotiated that winter by MLB and the MLB Players Association added clauses that included mandatory physicals for all top 200 prospects prior to the draft, and a rule that makes all future draft picks who fail a physical and do not receive an offer of at least 40 percent of the assigned value for that pick are to become free agents, with the team facing a reduction in the amount of money they can spend on their draft picks.

The Rangers assigned Loux to pitch for the Myrtle Beach Pelicans of the High–A Carolina League during the 2011 season. With the Pelicans, Loux had an 8–5 win–loss record with a 3.80 earned run average (ERA) in 21 games started. In 2012, with the Frisco RoughRiders of the Double–A Texas League, Loux began the season with a 9–0 record and 2.20 earned run average. After finishing the season with a 14–1 record, a 3.47 ERA and 100 strikeouts, Loux was named the Texas League Pitcher of the Year.

=== Chicago Cubs ===
At the 2012 trade deadline, the Rangers acquired Geovany Soto from the Chicago Cubs for Jake Brigham; however, the Cubs were concerned about Brigham's health and agreed to the trade on the condition that if Brigham was unable to play, the Cubs would send Brigham back to the Rangers and acquire Loux and a player to be named later in his place. On November 20, 2012, with Brigham experiencing an elbow injury, Loux was traded to the Cubs.

Loux pitched for the Iowa Cubs of the Triple–A Pacific Coast League in 2013. He suffered a shoulder injury and underwent Tommy John surgery, which forced him to miss the 2014 season. In 2015, Loux experienced an elbow injury after making three starts for Iowa, and was released on July 17, 2015.

=== Independent baseball ===
In 2016, Loux pitched in two independent baseball leagues. He pitched for the Laredo Lemurs of the American Association of Independent Professional Baseball, and for the Sugar Land Skeeters of the Atlantic League of Professional Baseball. Loux has not pitched professionally since 2016.

== Scouting report ==
Loux throws four pitches, of which he considers his fastball to be his best. It can reach 94 miles per hour (151 km/h). He also throws a curveball, a slider, and a changeup.
