= Jake Brigham =

American baseball player (born 1988)

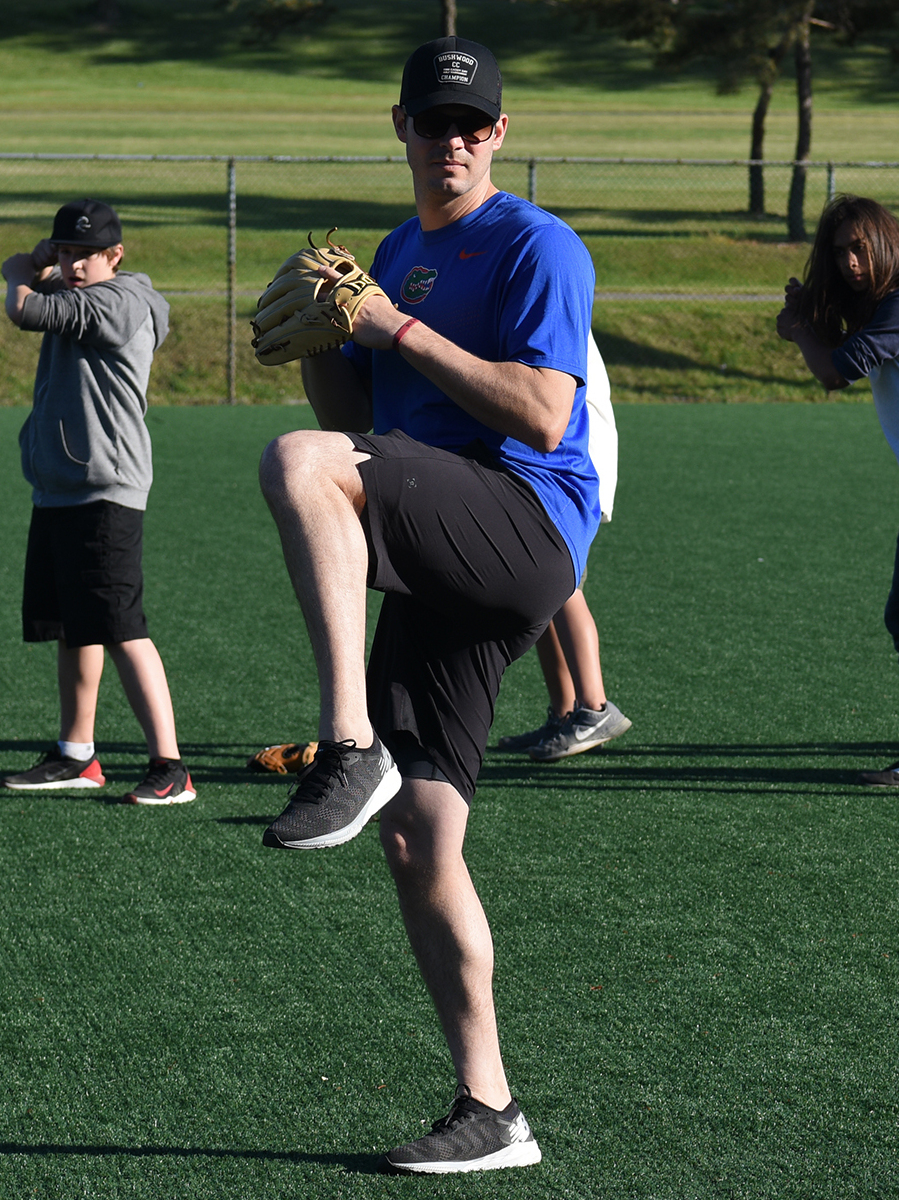
- Brigham at Osan Air Base in 2019
- Starting pitcher
- Born: February 10, 1988 (age 38); Winter Garden, Florida, U.S.
- Batted: Right Threw: Right

Professional debut
- MLB: June 30, 2015, for the Atlanta Braves
- NPB: April 14, 2016, for the Tohoku Rakuten Golden Eagles
- KBO: May 18, 2017, for the Kiwoom Heroes
- CPBL: March 19, 2021, for the Wei Chuan Dragons

Last appearance
- MLB: August 30, 2015, for the Atlanta Braves
- NPB: July 12, 2016, for the Tohoku Rakuten Golden Eagles
- KBO: July 7, 2021, for the Kiwoom Heroes
- CPBL: October 21, 2023, for the Wei Chuan Dragons

MLB statistics
- Win–loss record: 0–1
- Earned run average: 8.64
- Strikeouts: 12

NPB statistics
- Win–loss record: 0–3
- Earned run average: 5.24
- Strikeouts: 27

KBO statistics
- Win–loss record: 50–26
- Earned run average: 3.63
- Strikeouts: 557

CPBL statistics
- Win–loss record: 26–16
- Earned run average: 2.37
- Strikeouts: 227
- Stats at Baseball Reference

Teams
- Atlanta Braves (2015); Tohoku Rakuten Golden Eagles (2016); Nexen / Kiwoom Heroes (2017–2020); Wei Chuan Dragons (2021); Kiwoom Heroes (2021); Wei Chuan Dragons (2022–2023)

Career highlights and awards
- CPBL: Taiwan Series champion (2023)

Jacob Daniel Brigham (born February 10, 1988) is an American former professional baseball pitcher. He made his Major League Baseball (MLB) debut in 2015 with the Atlanta Braves. He also played in Nippon Professional Baseball (NPB) for the Tohoku Rakuten Golden Eagles, in the KBO League for the Nexen / Kiwoom Heroes, and in the Chinese Professional Baseball League (CPBL) for the Wei Chuan Dragons.

== Career ==
=== Texas Rangers ===
Brigham attended Central Florida Christian Academy in Orlando, Florida, where he played for the school's baseball team. He pitched a no-hitter in 2005, his junior season, against West Oak, though he allowed two unearned runs. The Texas Rangers drafted Brigham in the sixth round (178th overall) of the 2006 Major League Baseball draft. They added him to their 40-man roster after the 2011 season to protect him from the Rule 5 draft.

=== Chicago Cubs ===
In July 2012, Brigham was traded to the Chicago Cubs for Geovany Soto.

=== Second Stint with Rangers ===
He was traded back to the Rangers for Barret Loux on November 20, 2012. He was non tendered by the Rangers on November 30 and became a free agent, but re-signed with the Rangers on a minor league contract.

Brigham became a free agent again after the 2013 season.

=== Pittsburgh Pirates ===
He signed a minor league contract with the Pittsburgh Pirates' organization for the 2014 season.

=== Atlanta Braves ===
He signed with the Atlanta Braves' organization prior to the 2015 season. Brigham was called up to the majors for the first time on June 27, 2015. Brigham made his Major League debut on June 30, 2015, pitching three innings against the Washington Nationals while striking out four batters and allowing only one hit. He elected free agency on November 6.

=== Detroit Tigers ===
On December 11, 2015, Brigham signed a minor-league contract with the Detroit Tigers.

=== Tohoku Rakuten Golden Eagles ===
On December 18, 2015, the Tigers sold Brigham's rights to the Tohoku Rakuten Golden Eagles.

=== Detroit Tigers (second stint) ===
On January 10, 2017, Brigham signed a minor-league contract with the Tigers.

=== Nexen/Kiwoom Heroes ===
On May 4, 2017, Brigham signed a contract with the Nexen Heroes of the KBO League. Brigham signed a $650,000 contract for the 2018 season with the Heroes on November 24, 2017. On November 23, 2018, Brigham re-signed to a $900,000 contract with the team, now named the Kiwoom Heroes, for the 2019 season. Brigham posted a 13–5 record with a 2.96 ERA over 158.1 innings in 2019. On December 9, 2019, Brigham re-signed with Kiwoom for the 2020 season on a $950,000 contract. Following the 2020 season, the Heroes announced they would part ways with Brigham, and he became a free agent.

=== Wei Chuan Dragons ===
On December 26, 2020, Brigham signed with the Wei Chuan Dragons of the Chinese Professional Baseball League for the 2021 season. On March 19, 2021, Brigham made his CPBL debut. Through his first four starts with the Dragons, Brigham pitched to a 0.42 ERA and 0.78 WHIP over 21.2 innings of work.

=== Kiwoom Heroes (second stint) ===
On April 15, 2021, Brigham's contract was purchased by the Kiwoom Heroes of the KBO League. In 10 starts, Brigham posted a 7–3 record with a 2.95 ERA. On September 4, 2021, Brigham parted ways with the club for personal reasons.

=== Wei Chuan Dragons (second stint) ===
On January 5, 2022, Brigham re-signed with the Wei Chuan Dragons of the Chinese Professional Baseball League. He made 29 starts for Wei Chuan in 2022, logging a 12-9 record and 2.71 ERA with 110 strikeouts in 182.1 innings pitched.

On May 9, 2023, it was announced that Brigham would miss 6-8 weeks after suffering a hairline fracture in his left foot. He became a free agent following the 2023 season.

== Personal life ==
Brigham and his wife, Taylor, have three daughters and a son He is the nephew of former White Sox catcher Ron Karkovice.
