= Roger Bernadina =

Dutch Curaçaoan baseball player (born 1984)

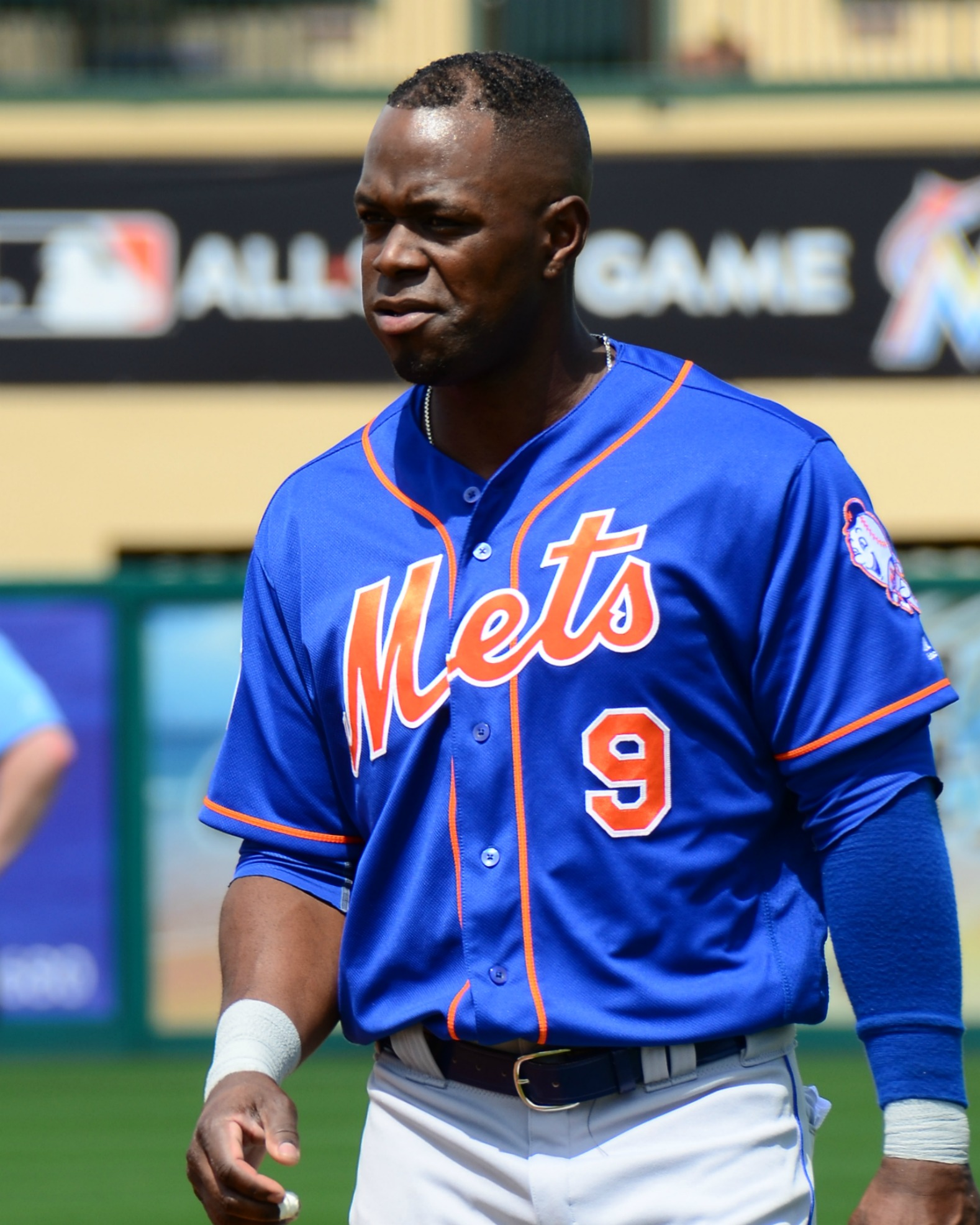
- Bernadina with the New York Mets in 2016
- Outfielder
- Born: June 12, 1984 (age 42); Willemstad, Curaçao
- Batted: Left Threw: Left

Professional debut
- MLB: June 29, 2008, for the Washington Nationals
- KBO: March 31, 2017, for the Kia Tigers
- CPBL: May 22, 2019, for the Lamigo Monkeys

Last appearance
- MLB: September 28, 2014, for the Los Angeles Dodgers
- KBO: October 13, 2018, for the Kia Tigers
- CPBL: June 29, 2019, for the Lamigo Monkeys

MLB statistics
- Batting average: .236
- Home runs: 28
- Runs batted in: 121

KBO statistics
- Batting average: .315
- Home runs: 47
- Runs batted in: 181

CPBL statistics
- Batting average: .256
- Home runs: 2
- Runs batted in: 11
- Stats at Baseball Reference

Teams
- Washington Nationals (2008–2013); Philadelphia Phillies (2013); Cincinnati Reds (2014); Los Angeles Dodgers (2014); Kia Tigers (2017–2018); Lamigo Monkeys (2019)

Career highlights and awards
- KBO Runs leader (2017); KBO League Golden Glove Award (2017); Korean Series champion (2017)
Medals
Men's baseball
Representing Netherlands
European Baseball Championship
Gold medal – first place	2007 Montjuïc	National team
Gold medal – first place	2016 Hoofddorp	National team
Gold medal – first place	2019 Bonn	National team
Gold medal – first place	2021 Turin	Team
Bronze medal – third place	2023 Czechia	National team
France International Baseball Tournament
Gold medal – first place	2014 Sénart	National team

Rogearvin Argelo "Roger" Bernadina (born June 12, 1984), nicknamed "the Shark," is a Dutch Curaçaoan former professional baseball outfielder. He played in Major League Baseball (MLB) for the Washington Nationals, Philadelphia Phillies, Cincinnati Reds, and Los Angeles Dodgers from 2008 to 2014, primarily as a backup outfielder. He then played for the Kia Tigers in the KBO League in 2017, winning a Golden Glove and the Korean Series, and 2018. He joined the Lamigo Monkeys in the Chinese Professional Baseball League (CPBL) in 2019 before playing in Europe. He was a member of the Netherlands national baseball team in the 2013 and 2023 World Baseball Classics and other international tournaments.

== Career ==
=== Washington Nationals ===
Bernadina signed at age 17 with the then-Montreal Expos as an international free agent in 2001. In the minors, he was known as a strong baserunner and defensive center fielder but was raw at the plate, with a low .369 slugging percentage in four consecutive seasons. He suffered a ligament tear in his left ring finger in 2004,. then led the South Atlantic League with 75 walks in 2005. He first reached Double-A in 2006, and the Washington Nationals added him to their 40-man roster after the 2007 season, following a strong showing in an Olympic qualifier tournament in Spain. That year, he led the Nationals' minor league system with 40 stolen bases.

The Nationals called up Bernadina to the major leagues the first time on June 28, 2008 to replace the injured Lastings Milledge. His major league debut came the next day, and, batting leadoff, he hit a single to right field in his first major league at bat. He was sent back to the minors in July, then batted .306 with four steals as a September call-up. He was named the best baserunner in the Eastern League by league managers.

Bernadina started 2009 in Triple-A, but he was called up on April 15. After appearing in two games as a defensive replacement, he started his first game of the season on April 18. In the eighth inning, he made a spectacular catch against the wall against the Florida Marlins and fractured his right ankle. The play earned the nickname "the Shark." Bernadina was placed on the 15-day disabled list (DL) and later transferred to the 60-day DL. His only action the rest of the season was playing in two games for the Gulf Coast League Nationals.

After shuttling between Triple-A and Washington several times in April 2010, Bernadina was recalled on April 28 and remained with the team the rest on the season, playing all three outfield positions. On May 12, he hit his first and second MLB home runs against the New York Mets. The second was a go-ahead homer in the ninth inning off closer Francisco Rodriguez. Bernadina also made a leaping catch in right field that likely robbed Jeff Francoeur of a bases-clearing triple. Bernadina finished the season with career highs of 134 games played and 11 home runs, while batting .246 with 16 steals.

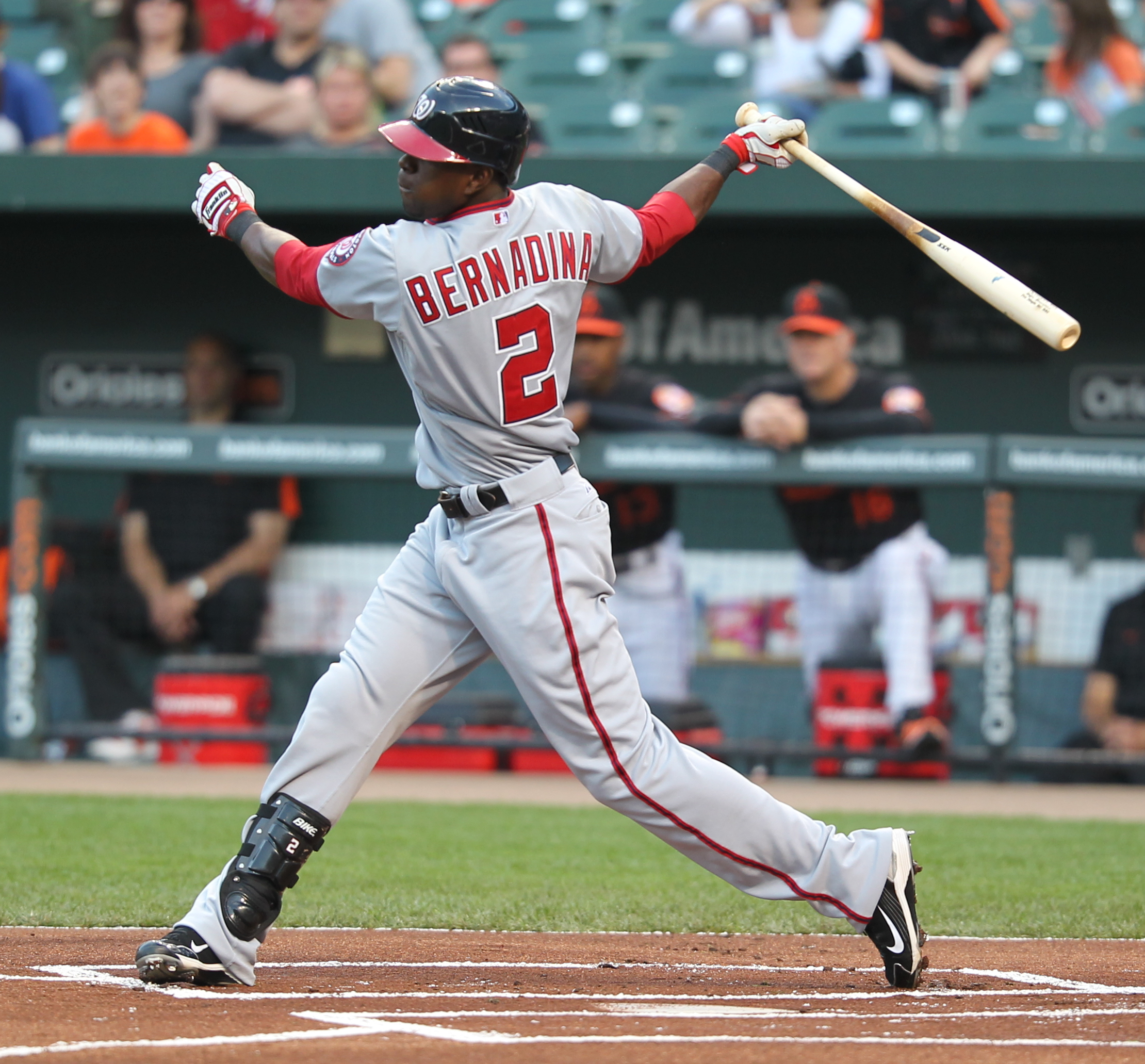
Bernadina with the Nationals in 2011

Bernadina's playing time lessened in 2011, and he shifted to primarily playing in center field. He finished the season with a similar batting line, hitting .243 with 7 home runs and a career-high 17 stolen bases.

2012 was Bernadina’s best offensive season in MLB. He compiled a slash line of .291/.372/.405 and made several highlight defensive plays, including a game-ending catch against the left-center field fence at Minute Maid Park on August 7. Bernadina made his only MLB postseason appearance in 2012, going 0-for-2 with two walks in four pinch hit appearances as the Nationals lost to the St. Louis Cardinals in the National League Division Series.

Bernadina's offensive production dropped off in 2013. On August 19, the Nationals released Bernadina to clear a roster spot for David DeJesus, who was acquired from the Chicago Cubs.

=== Philadelphia Phillies ===
On August 21, 2013, Bernadina signed a major league contract with the Philadelphia Phillies. In 27 games for Philadelphia, he batted .187/.256/.347 with two home runs, five runs batted in (RBI), and one stolen base. On October 16, Bernadina was removed from the 40-man roster and sent outright to Triple-A. He rejected the assignment and elected free agency the following day.

=== Cincinnati Reds ===
On January 31, 2014, Bernadina signed a minor league contract with the Cincinnati Reds that included a spring training invitation. After making the Opening Day roster, he was designated for assignment on May 3 but was called back up to the Reds on May 5 after an injury to Jay Bruce. Bernadina was designated for assignment again on June 21. On June 27, Bernadina refused the assignment to the minors and became a free agent. He hit .153 in 44 games for the Reds.

=== Los Angeles Dodgers ===
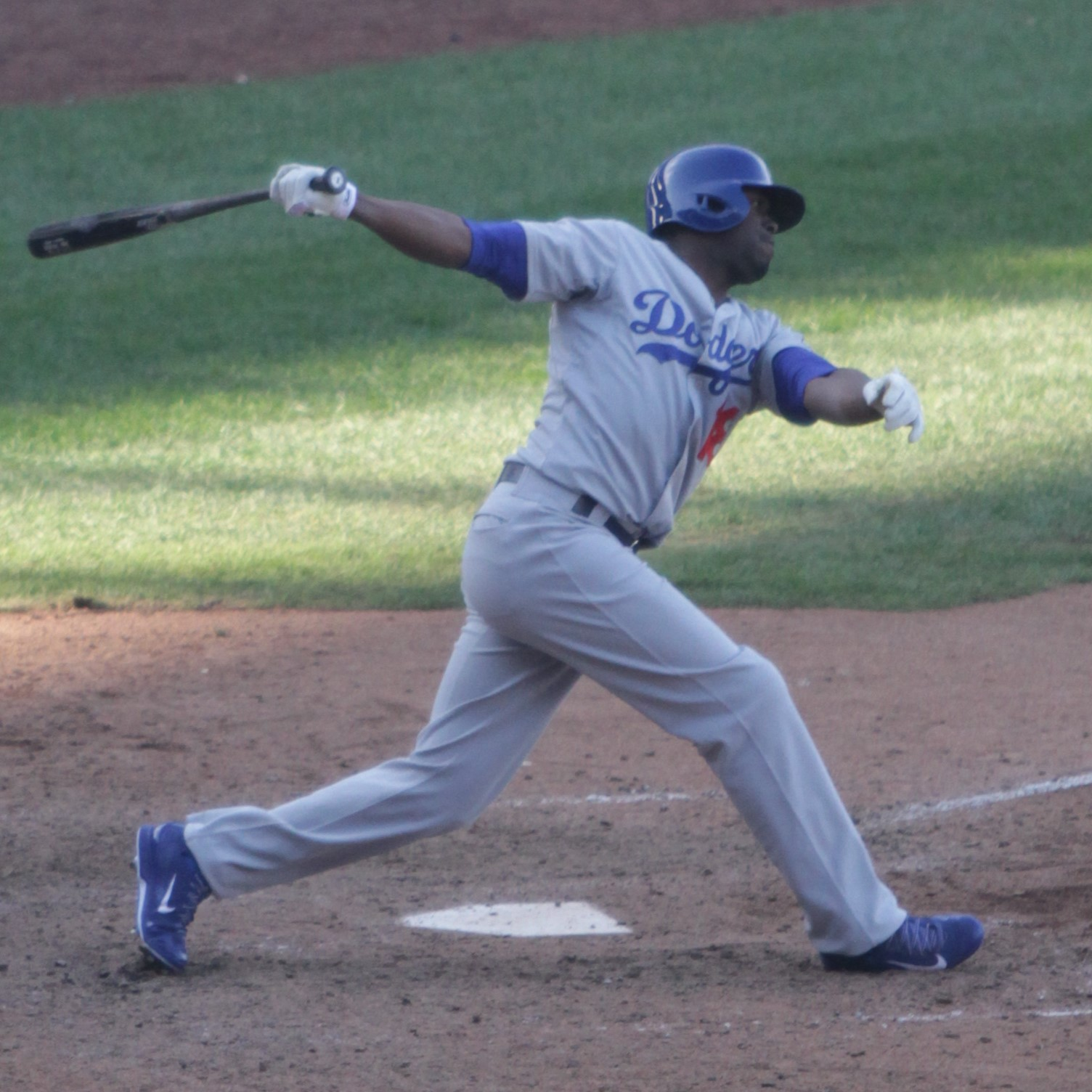
Bernadina with the Dodgers in 2014

On July 7, 2014, Bernadina signed a minor league contract with the Los Angeles Dodgers. He was assigned to the Triple-A Albuquerque Isotopes, where he hit .246 in 23 games. He was called up to the Dodgers on September 6. He was used primarily as a pinch runner for the Dodgers but also had seven pinch hit at-bats. In his final MLB game on September 28, he hit a single and a home run, his only home run of the season. Bernadina was left off the Dodgers' postseason roster. He elected free agency after the season.

=== Colorado Rockies ===
On December 24, 2014, Bernadina signed a minor-league contract with the Colorado Rockies. He played the entire 2015 season with the Isotopes, now the Rockies' Triple-A affiliate. Bernadina led the team with 62 RBI, 20 stolen bases, 58 walks, and tied for the lead with 20 home runs and 62 runs while also being the team's oldest position player. He elected free agency on November 6.

=== New York Mets ===
On February 8, 2016, Bernadina signed a minor league contract with the New York Mets organization. In 114 games for the Triple-A Las Vegas 51s, he batted .292/.376/.465 with 10 home runs, 55 RBI, and 20 stolen bases. Bernadina elected free agency following the season on November 7.

=== Kia Tigers ===
On November 24, 2016, Bernadina signed with the Kia Tigers of the KBO League. He had a .320 batting average, 27 home runs, 111 RBI, and 32 stolen bases in the 2017 season. He led the league in runs, was named a KBO All-Star, and earned a Golden Glove Award. He helped the Tigers win the Korean Series, hitting .529 with one home run five runs batted in during the postseason series. On December 1, 2017, Bernadina signed a one-year, $1.1 million contract with the Tigers. In 2018, he had .310 batting average, 20 home runs, and 70 runs batted in. He became a free agent after the 2018 season.

=== Lamigo Monkeys ===
On March 30, 2019, Bernadina signed with the Ishikawa Million Stars of the Baseball Challenge League. However, Bernadina left the Million Stars and signed with the Lamigo Monkeys of the Chinese Professional Baseball League on April 19. He debuted with the team on May 20 and posted a .256/.365/.378 slash line across 24 games before he was released by the team on June 30. Bernadina was hitless in his final 13 at-bats in Taiwan.

=== Algodoneros de Unión Laguna ===
On July 16, 2019, Bernadina signed with the Algodoneros de Unión Laguna of the Mexican League. He hit .336 with four home runs in 34 games with the team. He was released on February 6, 2020.

=== Quick Amersfoort ===
In August 2020, Bernadina signed with Quick Amersfoort in the Dutch Honkbal Hoofdklasse. He hit .286 in seven games in the regular season.

=== Curaçao Neptunus ===
Bernadina signed with Curaçao Neptunus in the Hoofdklasse for the 2021 season. In 150 games over three seasons with Neptunus, Bernadina hit .336 with 7 home runs, 110 runs batted in, and 24 stolen bases. On November 16, 2023, it was reported that Bernadina had left the club.

=== Hotsand Macerata Angels ===
On May 3, 2024, Bernadina signed with Hotsand Macerata Angels of the Italian Baseball League. In 22 games, he hit .267/.416/.417 with two home runs and 12 RBI.

== International career ==
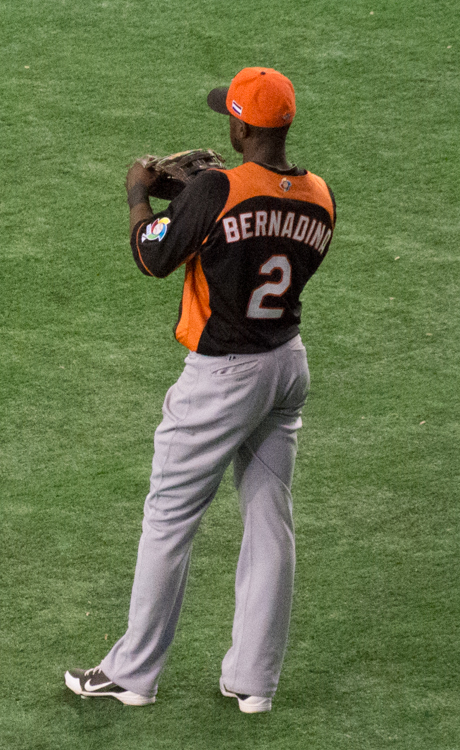
Bernadina playing for the Netherlands national team in the 2013 World Baseball Classic

Bernadina represented the Netherlands national baseball team at the 2013 World Baseball Classic and 2023 World Baseball Classic. He also played for the Dutch at several European Baseball Championships, Olympic qualifier tournaments, the 2019 WBSC Premier12, and Haarlem Baseball Week in 2022 and 2024. He was named to the All-Star team of the 2007 European championship after leading the tournament in stolen bases and runs scored.

== Personal life ==
Bernadina's younger brother, Roderick, played in the minors for the Baltimore Orioles from 2010 to 2013 and later for the Curaçao national team. Another brother, Ludwig, managed Sparta-Feyenoord in the Hoofdklasse from 2009 through July 2011.
