= Yang Hyeon-jong =

South Korean baseball player (born 1988)

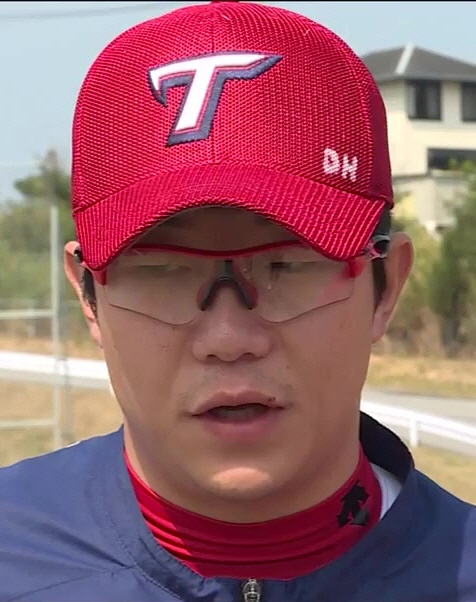
- Yang with the Kia Tigers

Kia Tigers – No. 54
- Starting pitcher
- Born: March 1, 1988 (age 38); Gwangju, South Korea
- Bats: Left Throws: Left

Professional debut
- KBO: April 7, 2007, for the Kia Tigers
- MLB: May 5, 2021, for the Texas Rangers

KBO statistics (through 2025)
- Win–loss record: 186–127
- Earned run average: 3.90
- Strikeouts: 2,185

MLB statistics (through 2021 season)
- Win–loss record: 0–3
- Earned run average: 5.60
- Strikeouts: 25
- Stats at Baseball Reference

Teams
- Kia Tigers (2007–2020); Texas Rangers (2021); Kia Tigers (2022–present)

Career highlights and awards
- 3× Korean Series champion (2009, 2017, 2024); 2× Choi Dong-won Award (2014, 2017); Korean Series MVP (2017); KBO MVP (2017); KBO Wins leader (2017); 2× KBO ERA leader (2015, 2019); KBO records: 2,178 career strikeouts
Medals
Men's baseball
Representing South Korea
World Junior Baseball Championship
Gold medal – first place	2006 Sancti Spíritus	Team
Asian Games
Gold medal – first place	2010 Guangzhou	Team
Gold medal – first place	2014 Incheon	Team
Gold medal – first place	2018 Jakarta	Team
WBSC Premier12
Silver medal – second place	2019 Tokyo	Team

Yang Hyeon-jong (Korean: 양현종; Hanja: 梁玹種; born March 1, 1988) is a Korean professional baseball pitcher for the Kia Tigers of the KBO League. He has previously played in Major League Baseball (MLB) for the Texas Rangers. He made his MLB debut with the Rangers in 2021. He won the Korean Series in 2009, 2017, and 2024, and was the Korean Series MVP and KBO MVP in 2017 as well. He is the KBO all-time leader in strikeouts.

== Amateur career ==
While attending Dongsung High School in Gwangju, South Korea, Yang was considered one of the nation's best high school left-handed pitchers along with Kim Kwang-Hyun. In April 2005, he participated in the 39th President's Cup National High School Baseball Championship and eventually led his school to their first championship since 1988, alongside fellow ace Han Ki-Joo. In April 2006, Yang was 2–1 with a 1.50 ERA at the 40th President's Cup National High School Baseball Championship, leading his team to runner-up as the team's ace. In August 2006, Yang led his team to runner-up at the 36th Phoenix Flag National High School Baseball Championship where he was named best pitcher, going 1–1 with an ERA of 0.90 and leading the tournament with 32 strikeouts.

In September 2006, Yang was selected for the South Korea junior national team alongside lefty rival Kim Kwang-Hyun that won the gold medal at the 2006 World Junior Baseball Championship in Cuba. In the round-robin, he pitched four scoreless innings against the Netherlands as a starting pitcher, racking up eight strikeouts. Yang started for South Korea in the semi-final game against Canada, facing future Mariners' pitching prospect Phillippe Aumont, and hurled three innings of two-hit, one-run ball with two strikeouts to help lead South Korea to a 6–1 victory. Yang posted a 1.04 ERA in 17.1 innings pitched in the tournament, and his 18 strikeouts were the second-highest total on the team after fellow left-hander Kim Kwang-Hyun (22 strikeouts). Yang was named to the All-Star team as the best left-handed pitcher.

== Professional career ==
=== Kia Tigers ===
Upon graduation from Dongsung High School, Yang was selected by the Kia Tigers in the 2nd round (1st pick, 9th overall) of the 2007 KBO Draft. He made his KBO debut on April 7, 2007, against the LG Twins at Jamsil Baseball Stadium in Seoul, coming from the bullpen, but allowed a solo home run in one inning pitched. He made his first start on April 12 against the Hyundai Unicorns and tossed 5.2 scoreless innings of four-hit ball. However, Yang struggled with his command and was never able to regain it to the level he had earlier in the season. At the end of May, Yang was eventually demoted to the reserve team of the Tigers. In August, the young left-hander came back to the Tigers first-team roster and pitched in relief of the Tigers' starters in the second half of the season. On September 29, 2007, Yang recorded his first professional win against the Hanwha Eagles in Daejeon, pitching five innings of two-hit, one-run ball as a starter. Yang finished his rookie season with a record of 1–2 and an ERA of 4.17 in 49.2 innings pitched, appearing in 31 games as a utility pitcher.

Yang had a disappointing sophomore season in 2008, slipping to 0–5 with a 5.83 ERA. He started the season as a starting pitcher, but struggled through five appearances with an ERA of 7.00 and was eventually relegated to the bullpen. Though frequently sent to the mound as a starter to fill a temporary void in the rotation during the season, Yang mainly pitched in relief for the Tigers, garnering 5 holds as a setup man.

In 2009, Yang had a career year. He was 9th in wins (12), 5th in ERA (3.15), 4th in strikeouts (139) and 12th in innings pitched (148.2), all of which were career bests. On August 11, he had one of his best performances of his pro career, hurling 7.1 shutout innings in which he only allowed 5 hits with no walks and struck out 10 batters against the Lotte Giants. On November 14, Yang pitched as the starter for the Tigers in the 2009 KBO-NPB Club Championship game against the Yomiuri Giants. In that game, he allowed only three hits and one run and racked up 6 strikeouts in 5.2 innings.

In 2010, Yang's ERA rose over a full point to 4.25 and gave up the second-highest number of hits in the KBO league with 169, resulting in a .272 batting average against. However, he had four more wins than the previous year, posting a 16–8 record and striking out 145 batters. Yang was runner-up in wins and third in strikeouts among the KBO pitchers in the 2010 season. He pitched his first career complete game shutout against the Samsung Lions on June 2.

In 2011, Yang struggled, recording a 6.18 ERA and 7–9 record with 74 strikeouts. The next year, Yang recorded a 5.05 ERA with 26 strikeouts. In 2013 for the Tigers, Yang pitched to a 9–3 record and 3.10 ERA with 95 strikeouts in 104.2 innings of work. In 2014, Yang led the league with 16 wins on the season to go along with a 4.25 ERA.

Yang was posted to MLB in November 2014. However, the Tigers rejected the winning bid, feeling that it was too low. (It was reported that the Minnesota Twins or the Texas Rangers were possibly the highest bidders with a bid estimated at $1.5 million, though the exact details were never disclosed.) Yang returned to the Tigers for the following season. On July 2, 2015, Yang threw a one-hit shutout against the Doosan Bears, striking out 10 and allowing two walks. On the year, he recorded a 15–6 record and a 2.44 ERA. In 2016, Yang pitched to a 10–12 record and 3.68 ERA with 146 strikeouts.

Yang was named the most valuable player of the 2017 Korean Series and won the KBO League Most Valuable Player Award for the 2017 KBO League season. He had pitched to a 20–6 record and 3.44 ERA with 158 strikeouts. Yang re-signed with the Tigers for the 2018 on a one-year contract. He pitched to a 13–11 record and 4.15 ERA for the Tigers in 2018. In 2019 for the Tigers, Yang pitched in 29 games on the season, pitching to a 16–8 record with a 2.29 ERA and 163 strikeouts over 184.2 innings pitched. In 2020, Yang recorded a 11–10 record and 4.70 ERA with 149 strikeouts in 172.1 innings pitched.

Yang finished his tenure with the Tigers with an overall 147–95 record to go along with a 3.83 ERA and 1,673 strikeouts in 14 seasons with the club.

=== Texas Rangers ===
On January 30, 2021, it was announced that Yang had ended negotiations with the Tigers for a new contract in hopes of landing a major league contract in Major League Baseball (MLB). On February 12, 2021, Yang signed a minor league contract with the Texas Rangers organization that included an invitation to Spring Training. The deal also included a $1.3 million guarantee if Yang made it to MLB.

On April 26, 2021, Yang was selected to the 40-man roster and promoted to the major leagues for the first time. Yang struggled to an 0–3 record and 5.59 ERA in 8 appearances for the team before being designated for assignment on June 17. He was outrighted to the Triple-A Round Rock Express on June 19. After posting a 5.60 ERA with 42 strikeouts through 10 games for Round Rock, the Rangers selected Yang's contract on August 24. On August 30, Yang was returned to Triple-A Round Rock. On September 1, Yang was again selected to the active roster. Yang was again designated for assignment by the Rangers on September 15. Yang made 12 appearances for Texas, posting a 5.60 ERA with 25 strikeouts. On October 4, Yang elected free agency.

=== Kia Tigers (second stint) ===
On December 24, 2021, Yang returned to the KBO League with the Kia Tigers. He achieved various milestone records, including the youngest 2,000 innings, the youngest 150 wins, 100 innings for nine consecutive seasons, 2,100 innings, 9,000 batters, 1,800 strikeouts, eight consecutive double-digit wins, three-digit strikeouts, and 170 innings. Yang was named an All–Star in 2022, a season that saw him accumulate 12–7 record and 3.85 ERA with 141 strikeouts across 175 1/3 innings pitched.

On June 6, 2024, Yang recorded his 2,000th career KBO strikeout, joining longtime Hanwha Eagle Jin-woo Song as the only pitchers to achieve the feat. On August 21 against the Lotte Giants, Yang recorded his 2,049th strikeout, passing Song and becoming the KBO all–time leader in strikeouts. In 29 starts for Kia in 2024, he compiled an 11–5 record and 4.10 ERA with 129 strikeouts across 171 1/3 innings pitched. With Kia, Yang won the 2024 Korean Series.

On December 4, 2025, Yang re-signed with the Tigers on a three-year contract worth 4.5 billion won.

== International career ==
He represented South Korea at the 2010 Asian Games, 2014 Asian Games, 2017 World Baseball Classic, and 2018 Asian Games. He led the 2019 WBSC Premier12 tournament with 17 strikeouts.

== See also ==
- List of KBO career win leaders
- List of KBO career strikeout leaders
