= Dustin Nippert =

American baseball player (born 1981)

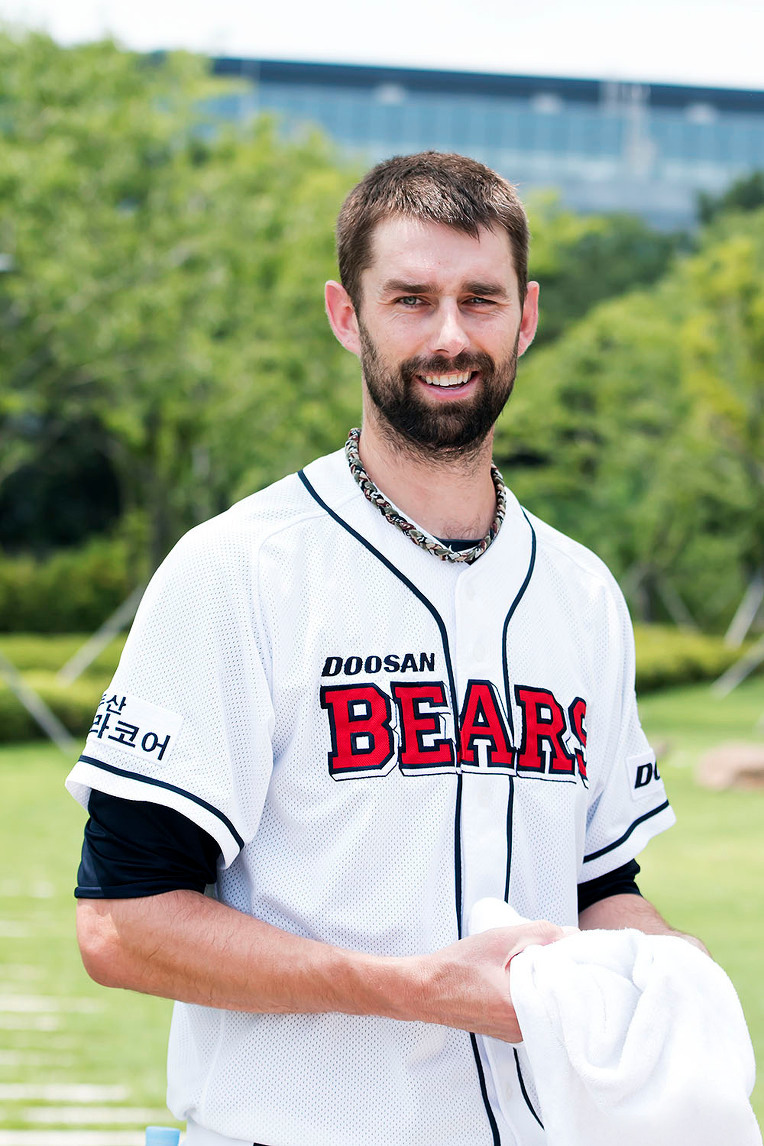
- Nippert with the Doosan Bears in 2015
- Starting pitcher
- Born: May 6, 1981 (age 45); Wheeling, West Virginia, U.S.
- Batted: Right Threw: Right

Professional debut
- MLB: September 8, 2005, for the Arizona Diamondbacks
- KBO: April 2, 2011, for the Doosan Bears

Last appearance
- MLB: July 19, 2010, for the Texas Rangers
- KBO: October 13, 2018, for the KT Wiz

MLB statistics
- Win–loss record: 14–16
- Earned run average: 5.31
- Strikeouts: 214

KBO statistics
- Win–loss record: 102–51
- Earned run average: 3.59
- Strikeouts: 1,082
- Stats at Baseball Reference

Teams
- Arizona Diamondbacks (2005–2007); Texas Rangers (2008–2010); Doosan Bears (2011–2017); KT Wiz (2018)

Career highlights and awards
- KBO MVP (2016); KBO ERA leader (2016); KBO wins leader (2016); KBO Golden Gloves Award (2016); 2× Korean Series champion (2015, 2016)

Dustin David Nippert (born May 6, 1981) is an American former professional baseball pitcher. He played for the Arizona Diamondbacks and Texas Rangers of Major League Baseball, and the Doosan Bears and KT Wiz of the KBO League. Nippert won the KBO League Most Valuable Player Award in 2016. With eight seasons in the KBO, Nippert holds the record for the longest career of any foreign player.

== Early life and education ==
Nippert was born in Wheeling, West Virginia, and grew up in the small Ohio town of Beallsville, where he played baseball for Beallsville High School. He first attended Ohio Valley University before transferring to West Virginia University, where he played college baseball for the Mountaineers in 2002.

== Career ==
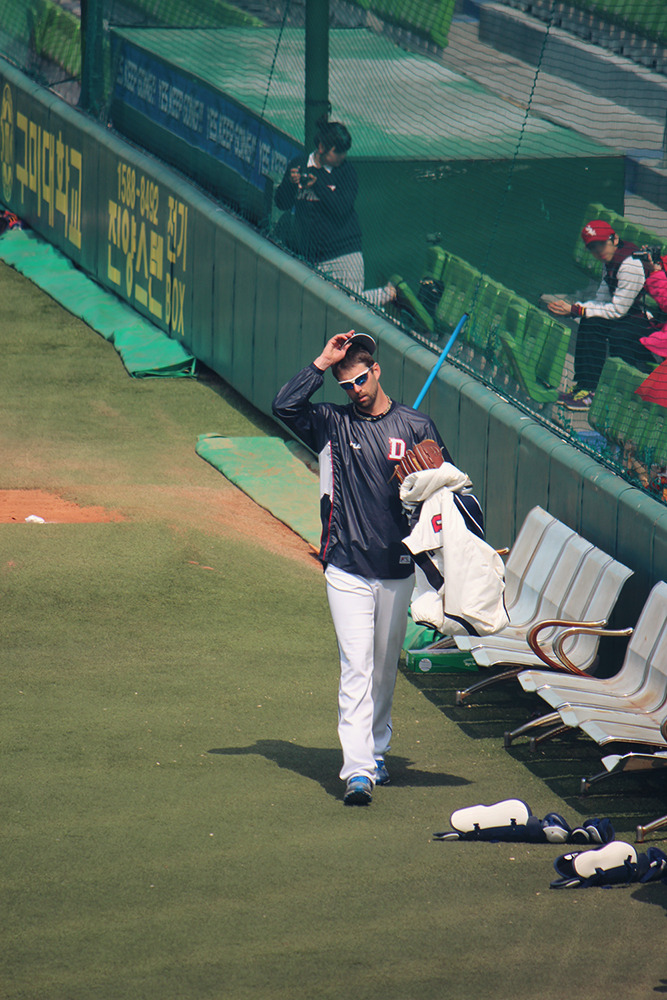
Nippert with the Doosan Bears.

=== Major League Baseball ===
The Arizona Diamondbacks selected Nippert in the 15th round of the 2002 Major League Baseball draft. He made his major league debut against the Pittsburgh Pirates on September 8, 2005. On March 28, 2008, he was traded to the Texas Rangers for Jose Marte.

On June 29, 2008, Nippert threw a seven-inning no-hitter for Triple-A Oklahoma City RedHawks against the Omaha Royals.

The 2009 season is best on record for Nippert in his major league career, when he compiled a 5–3 record with an ERA of 3.88 in 69.2 innings for the Rangers. During the next year, he was able to shake off a scary incident on July 19, 2010, when he was hit on the side of the head by a line drive hit by Austin Jackson against the Detroit Tigers. The ball was hit so hard that it ricocheted off of his head and past third base into left field. Nippert walked off the field smiling to a standing ovation in Detroit but was placed on the 15-day DL after the game.

=== Korea Baseball Organization ===
On March 3, 2011, Nippert signed with the Doosan Bears of the Korea Baseball Organization, after an attempt to sign with a Japanese baseball team had failed. Due to his solid performances in a Doosan uniform, the team's fans have christened him "Ninunim" (Korean: 니느님), with the name being a portmanteau of his last name and the Korean word for God "Hanunim" (하느님). In the 2015 KBO post-season, he pitched 26 2/3 scoreless innings during the Bears run to the fourth Korean Series championship in the team's history. On November 14, 2016, he won KBO League Most Valuable Player Award, becoming the fourth foreign player to be awarded in the 34-year history of the league.

On January 23, 2017, Nippert re-signed with the Doosan Bears for another year, earning $2.1 million per year, which is the highest annual income ever of a foreign player in the Korea Baseball Organization. Nippert pitched to a 14–8 record with a 4.06 ERA during the regular season, and started Game 1 of the 2017 Korean Series.

On January 4, 2018, Nippert signed with the KT Wiz. The Doosan Bears had recommended he retire, but Nippert had a strong will to extend his active service. He signed a $1 million contract with the Wiz. On June 29, 2018, with a victory against the NC Dinos, Nippert became the first foreign pitcher in the KBO league to win 100 games in his career.

== Personal life ==
Nippert has two children, son Caden (born in 2006) and daughter Aubrey (born 2008), from his first marriage. He and his ex-wife Carrie divorced in 2014 after 10 years of marriage.

Since 2015, Nippert is married to a South Korean woman. The couple have two children together, Levi and Owen.

== Filmography ==
=== Television show ===
Year	Title	Network	Role	Ref.
2022	Back to the Ground	MBN	Participant	
2022	United Fathers	MBC	Participant	
2023	Physical: 100	Netflix	Participant	
2024	A Clean Sweep	Netflix	Participant	

== See also ==
- List of KBO career win leaders
