= Danny Dorn =

American baseball player & coach (born 1984)

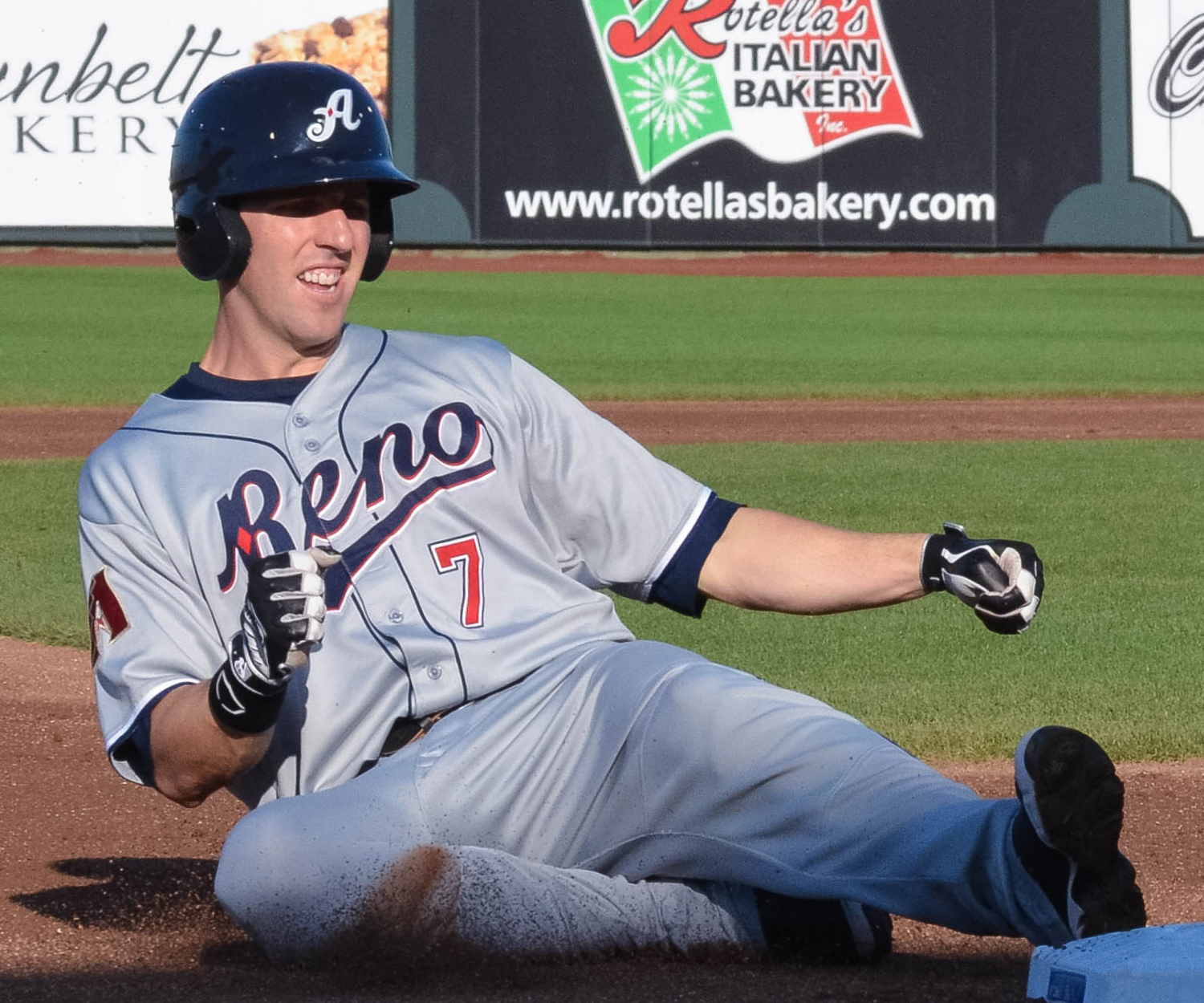
- Dorn playing for the Reno Aces in 2015
- Right fielder / First baseman
- Born: July 20, 1984 (age 42); San Dimas, California, U.S.
- Batted: Left Threw: Left

Professional debut
- MLB: April 21, 2015, for the Arizona Diamondbacks
- KBO: April 1, 2016, for the Nexen Heroes

Last appearance
- MLB: July 19, 2015, for the Arizona Diamondbacks
- KBO: July 11, 2017, for the Nexen Heroes

MLB statistics
- Batting average: .167
- Home runs: 0
- Runs batted in: 3

KBO statistics
- Batting average: .278
- Home runs: 17
- Runs batted in: 72
- Stats at Baseball Reference

Teams
- Arizona Diamondbacks (2015); Nexen Heroes (2016–2017)

Daniel Casey Dorn (born July 20, 1984) is an American former professional baseball right fielder and first baseman. He played in Major League Baseball (MLB) for the Arizona Diamondbacks and in KBO League for the Nexen Heroes.

== Playing career ==
=== Amateur ===
Dorn played college baseball at California State University, Fullerton from 2003 to 2006. In 2005, he played collegiate summer baseball with the Brewster Whitecaps of the Cape Cod Baseball League. After his junior season, he was drafted by the Tampa Bay Devil Rays in the 23rd round of the 2005 Major League Baseball draft. He did not sign and returned for his senior season.

=== Cincinnati Reds ===
Dorn was drafted by the Cincinnati Reds in the 32nd round, with the 954th overall selection, of the 2006 Major League Baseball draft. He made his professional debut with the rookie-level Billings Mustangs, batting .354 with eight home runs, 40 RBI, and three stolen bases across 60 appearances.

Dorn split the 2007 season between the High-A Sarasota Reds and Double-A Chattanooga Lookouts, playing in 118 games and hitting a combined .287/.373/.500 with 20 home runs and 87 RBI. He returned to the two affiliates for the 2008 campaign, batting .275/.363/.537 with 22 home runs and 63 RBI across 103 appearances.

Dorn spent 2009 with the Triple-A Louisville Bats, playing in 112 games and slashing .275/.337/.457 with 14 home runs and 47 RBI. He made 84 appearances for the Bats in 2010, hitting .302/.398/.546 with 13 home runs and 46 RBI. Dorn spent a third consecutive season with Louisville in 2011, playing in 124 contests and batting .248/.310/.440 with 18 home runs and 74 RBI.

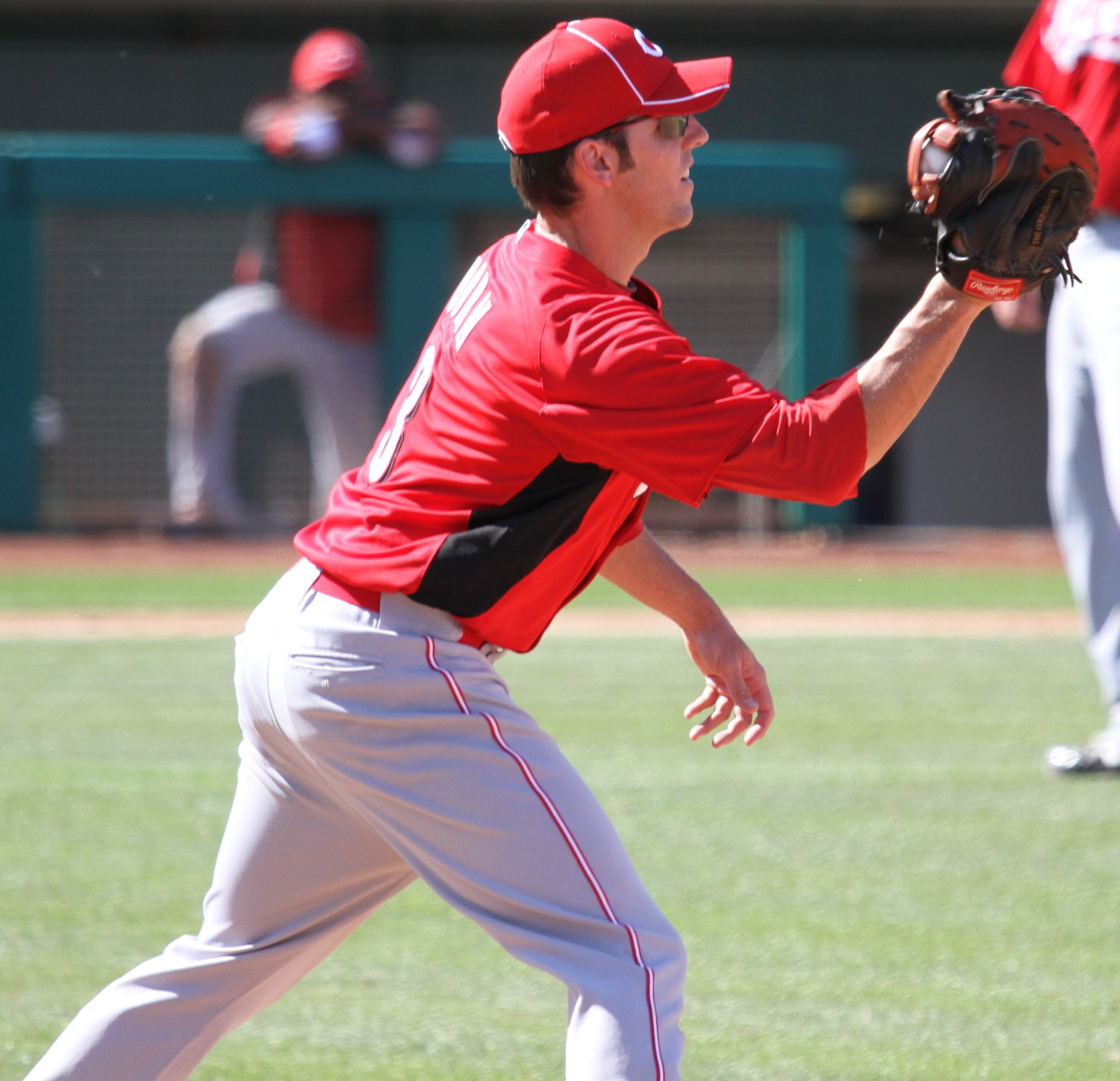
Dorn with the Reds during spring training in 2012

Dorn began the 2012 season back with Louisville; his fourth consecutive year with the affiliate. In 69 appearances for the Bats, he slashed .230/.321/.394 with seven home runs, 24 RBI, and one stolen base. Dorn was released by the Reds organization on June 30, 2012.

=== Detroit Tigers ===
On July 15, 2012, Dorn signed a minor league deal with the Detroit Tigers.

Dorn made 137 appearances for the Triple-A Toledo Mud Hens in 2013, slashing .258/.335/.460 with 25 home runs and 83 RBI. He elected free agency following the season on November 4, 2013.

=== Arizona Diamondbacks ===
On November 27, 2013, Dorn signed with the Arizona Diamondbacks organization. He split the 2014 season between the rookie-level Arizona League Diamondbacks and Triple-A Reno Aces, playing in 75 total games and hitting .310/.382/.557 with 12 home runs and 50 RBI.

Dorn was called up to the majors for the first time on April 21, 2015. In 23 appearances for Arizona, he went 5-for-30 (.167) with 3 RBI and 2 walks. On August 24, Dorn was designated for assignment by the Diamondbacks.

=== Toronto Blue Jays ===
Dorn was claimed off waivers by the Toronto Blue Jays on August 28, 2015, and assigned to the Triple-A Buffalo Bisons. Dorn was designated for assignment following the acquisition of Matt Dominguez on September 6. He cleared waivers and was sent outright to Triple-A Buffalo on September 9. In six games for Buffalo, Dorn went 5-for-22 (.227) with one RBI and one stolen base. He elected free agency following the season on November 6.

=== Nexen Heroes ===
On November 26, 2015, Dorn signed a one-year, $750,000 contract with the Nexen Heroes of the KBO League. He made 129 appearances for Nexen during the 2016 season, hitting .295/.399/.494 with 16 home runs and 70 RBI.

Dorn played in 20 games for the Heroes in 2017, batting .140/.246/.240 with one home run and two RBI. Dorn was released by the Heroes amid continue struggles on July 18, 2017.

=== Somerset Patriots ===
On March 19, 2018, Dorn signed with the Somerset Patriots of the Atlantic League of Professional Baseball. In 51 appearances for Somerset, he batted .246/.310/.298 with one home run and 22 RBI. Dorn became a free agent following the season.

== Coaching career ==
In 2020, Dorn was announced as the manager for the Los Angeles Dodgers Dominican Summer League affiliate. In 2021, Dorn became the manager of the Arizona League Dodgers.

On February 23, 2024, Dorn was announced as the hitting coach, remaining with the rookie–level Arizona Complex League Dodgers.
