= Héctor Noesí =

Dominican baseball player (born 1987)

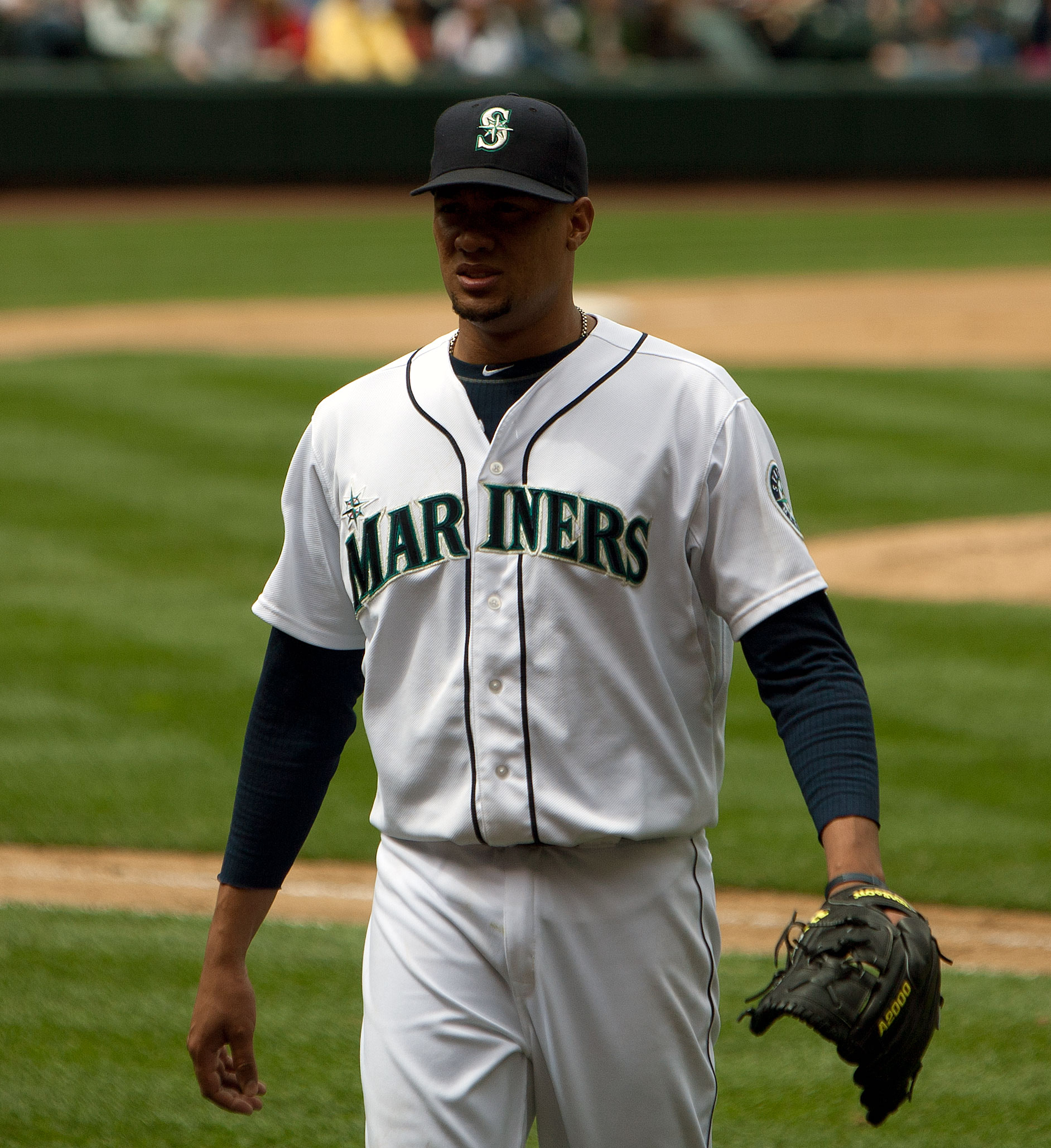
- Noesí with the Seattle Mariners
- Pitcher
- Born: 26 January 1987 (age 39); Esperanza, Dominican Republic
- Batted: Right Threw: Right

Professional debut
- MLB: 18 May, 2011, for the New York Yankees
- KBO: 2 April, 2016, for the Kia Tigers

Last appearance
- MLB: 27 September, 2019, for the Miami Marlins
- KBO: 11 October, 2018, for the Kia Tigers

MLB statistics
- Win–loss record: 12–34
- Earned run average: 5.51
- Strikeouts: 303

KBO statistics
- Win–loss record: 46–20
- Earned run average: 3.79
- Strikeouts: 425
- Stats at Baseball Reference

Teams
- New York Yankees (2011); Seattle Mariners (2012–2014); Texas Rangers (2014); Chicago White Sox (2014–2015); Kia Tigers (2016–2018); Miami Marlins (2019)

Career highlights and awards
- Korean Series champion (2017); KBO Wins leader (2017)

Héctor Noesí (/ˈɛktɔːr noʊɛˈsi/; born 26 January 1987) is a Dominican former professional baseball pitcher. He played in Major League Baseball (MLB) for the New York Yankees, Seattle Mariners, Texas Rangers, Chicago White Sox, and Miami Marlins, and in the KBO League for the Kia Tigers.

== Professional career ==
=== New York Yankees ===
Noesí signed with the New York Yankees as an international free agent in 2004. He made his professional debut in 2006 with the Gulf Coast Yankees. He was assigned to the Single-A Charleston RiverDogs in 2007 but was injured, necessitating Tommy John surgery.

Healthy in 2009, Noesí pitched well for Charleston and the High-A Tampa Yankees. He was named Pitcher of the Week for the week of May 18 and was a South Atlantic League mid-season All-Star. Following the season, Noesí was added to the 40-man roster to protect him from the Rule 5 draft.

Noesí began 2010 with Tampa, where he was named Pitcher of the Week for the week of April 19 and a mid-season All-Star. He was promoted to the Double-A Trenton Thunder, where he was named Eastern League Pitcher of the Week for the week of June 7, and the Triple-A Scranton/Wilkes-Barre Yankees. Noesí pitched in the All-Star Futures Game.

On April 13, 2011, Noesí was called up to the major leagues for the first time in his career, replacing relief pitcher Luis Ayala, who the Yankees put on the disabled list. He was optioned to Triple-A on April 22 without having made his major league debut, briefly becoming a phantom ballplayer. Noesí made his major league debut on May 18, pitching four scoreless innings of relief and earning the win in an extra-innings game against the Baltimore Orioles. He made his first MLB start on September 21.

=== Seattle Mariners ===
On January 23, 2012, the Yankees traded Noesí and Jesús Montero to the Seattle Mariners for Michael Pineda and minor league pitcher José Campos. Noesí performed poorly in the first half of the 2012 season, going 2–11 with a 5.77 ERA. He was demoted to the Triple-A Tacoma Rainiers on July 4. Noesí was recalled on September 4 when rosters expanded.

Noesí spent most of 2013 season shuttling back and forth between Seattle and Tacoma. The Mariners designated Noesí for assignment on April 4, 2014.

=== Texas Rangers ===
On April 12, 2014, Noesi was traded to the Texas Rangers. He made his Rangers debut against the Mariners two days later. He was designated for assignment on April 22.

=== Chicago White Sox ===
On April 25, 2014, Noesi was claimed off waivers by the Chicago White Sox. In 28 games (27 starts) for the White Sox, he had an 8–11 record and 4.39 ERA with 117 strikeouts across 166 innings.

Noesí made 10 appearances for Chicago in 2015, struggling to an 0–4 record and 6.89 ERA with 22 strikeouts over 32 2/3 innings pitched. He was designated for assignment by the White Sox on June 18. Noesí cleared waivers and was sent outright to the Triple-A Charlotte Knights on June 26.

=== Kia Tigers ===
Noesí signed a $1.7 million deal to pitch for the Kia Tigers of the KBO League in 2017. He became the second highest paid player in the KBO. Noesí had a 20–5 record with a 3.48 earned run average during the regular season and started Game 1 of the 2017 Korean Series. On December 1, Noesí signed a one-year, $2 million contract with the Tigers. On December 4, 2018, the Tigers announced that Noesí would not return with the team due to the recent increased tax rate on foreign players.

=== Miami Marlins ===
On January 17, 2019, Noesí signed a minor league contract with the Miami Marlins. On August 6, the Marlins selected Noesí's contract. On October 16, Noesí was removed from the 40-man roster and sent outright to the minors, but he elected free agency the next day.

=== Later career ===
On December 17, 2019, Noesí signed a minor league contract with the Pittsburgh Pirates. On July 8, 2020, Noesí announced he would be opting out of the 2020 season during the COVID-19 pandemic. He became a free agent on November 2.

On December 24, Noesí signed a $500,000 contract with the Fubon Guardians of the Chinese Professional Baseball League for the 2021 season. However, his contract was later terminated prior to the season on February 21, 2021, after he sustained an injury while training in the offseason.

== Pitching style ==
Noesi threw five pitches. He led with a four-seam fastball averaging about 93 mph, a pitch he threw about half the time. He also threw a slider and changeup in the mid 80s, a curveball in the upper 70s, and a two-seam fastball.
