= Kim Joo-chan =

South Korean baseball player

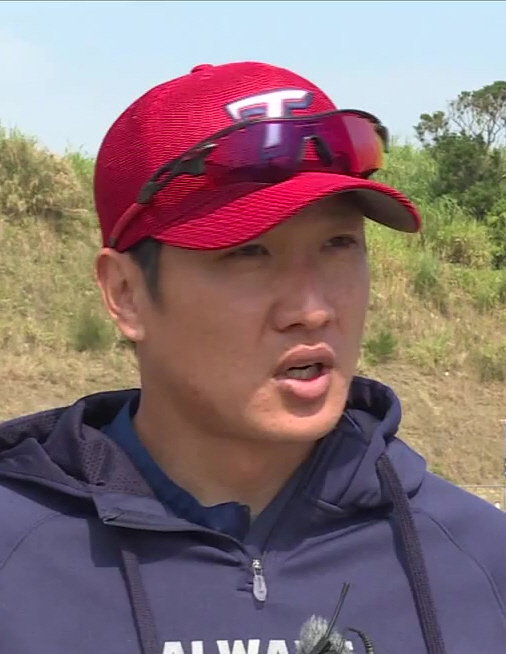

Kia Tigers – No. 16
- Left fielder
- Born: March 25, 1981 (age 45)
- Bats: Right Throws: Right

KBO debut
- 2000, for the Samsung Lions

KBO statistics (through July 27, 2019)
- Batting average: .299
- Hits: 1,848
- Home runs: 135
- RBI: 771
- Stats at Baseball Reference

Teams
- Samsung Lions (2000); Lotte Giants (2001–2012); Kia Tigers (2013–present)

- Kim Joo-chan
- Hangul: 김주찬
- Hanja: 金周璨
- RR: Gim Juchan
- MR: Kim Chuch'an

Kim Joo-chan (born March 25, 1981) is a South Korean professional baseball outfielder for the Kia Tigers of the KBO League.

On January 5, 2021, an article said that he would retire from active duty and start his coaching career at Doosan. Doosan seems to have offered Kim Joo-chan a coaching position without hesitation as there have been cases in which it has recently recruited retired players such as Cho Sung-hwan, Cho In-sung, and Bae Young-soo. Later, on January 8, the team's official announcement confirmed its trip to Doosan with Kim Ji-hoon, Yoo Jae-shin, and Jung Byung-gon. The position is a first-tier base running/outfielder defense coach, and you can see coach Kim Joo-chan next to the first base.

Ahead of the 2022 season, he changed his position from a first-tier base running/outfield defense coach to a first-tier strategy coach, which is Ko Young-min's 21st-season position. Fans' response was not bad as Doosan showed strong scoring chances in April by controlling fast runners such as Cho Soo-haeng and Jung Soo-bin in the third base, but the evaluation is getting worse as runners' bonehead play and brain base begin to be noticeable toward the middle of the season. Even now, in the second half of the year, most of the games are not able to bring an important score as runners continue to be base runners, so the evaluation is second only to Park Jae-sang among the league's third base coaches.

== Award ==
- 2016 KBO Golden Glove
