= Jin Hwan =

Korean painter

- Born: 1913; Mujang-myeon, Gochang, North Jeolla, Korea
- Died: 1951 (aged 37–38); Mujang-myeon, Gochang, North Jeolla, Korea
- Occupations: Painter, high-school principal, professor

Korean name
- Hangul: 진기용
- Hanja: 陳錤用
- RR: Jin Giyong
- MR: Chin Kiyong

Professional name
- Hangul: 진환
- Hanja: 陳瓛
- RR: Jin Hwan
- MR: Chin Hwan

Jin Hwan (1913 – 1951) was a Korean painter. His work was part of the painting event in the art competition at the 1936 Summer Olympics.

In 1946, he served as the principal of Youngsun High School in Gochang founded by his father. In 1948, he served as a professor at Hongik University in Seoul. In 1951, he died in Gochang during the Third Battle of Seoul of the Korean War.
