= Kim Se-hyun =

South Korean baseball player

- Pitcher
- Born: August 7, 1987 (age 38)
- Batted: Right Threw: Right

KBO debut
- August 16, 2007, for the Hyundai Unicorns

Last KBO appearance
- April 29, 2021, for the SSG Landers

KBO statistics
- Win–loss record: 30–41
- Earned run average: 5.18
- Strikeouts: 514
- Saves: 59

Teams
- Hyundai Unicorns (2007); Nexen Heroes (2008–2017); Kia Tigers (2017–2019); SK Wyverns / SSG Landers (2020–2021)

Career highlights and awards
- KBO saves leader (2016)

- Kim Se-hyun
- Hangul: 김세현
- Hanja: 金勢玹
- RR: Gim Sehyeon
- MR: Kim Sehyŏn

Former name
- Hangul: 김영민
- Hanja: 孫榮敏
- RR: Gim Yeongmin
- MR: Kim Yŏngmin

Kim Se-hyun (Korean: 김세현; born Kim Young-min, August 7, 1987) is a South Korean former pitcher who played for the SSG Landers in the KBO League. He bats and throws right-handed.

== Amateur career ==
Kim was born in Seoul, and attended Duksoo High School there. He first gained attention in 2004 when he led his team to the national championship and was named Best Pitcher at the 56th Hwarang Flag National Championship, a major competition for high school baseball in South Korea. The following year he helped his team to win its second consecutive championship at the 57th Hwarang Flag National Championship.

== Professional career ==
Kim made himself eligible for the 2006 KBO Draft and was selected as the 17th overall pick in the draft by the Hyundai Unicorns.

He changed his name to Kim Se-hyun in 2015.
