= Jin Hae-soo =

South Korean baseball player (born 1986)

Lotte Giants – No. 31
- Pitcher
- Born: June 26, 1986 (age 40); Busan, South Korea
- Bats: Left Throws: Left

KBO debut
- 2006, for the Kia Tigers

KBO statistics (through May 17, 2024)
- Win–loss record: 25–31
- Earned run average: 5.02
- Strikeouts: 491
- Holds: 157
- Saves: 2
- Stats at Baseball Reference

Teams
- Kia Tigers (2006–2013); SK Wyverns (2013–2015); LG Twins (2015–2023); Lotte Giants (2024–present)

- Jin Hae-soo
- Hangul: 진해수
- Hanja: 陳該受
- RR: Jin Haesu
- MR: Chin Haesu

Former name
- Hangul: 진민호
- Hanja: 陳敏湖
- RR: Jin Minho
- MR: Chin Minho

Jin Hae-soo (born June 26, 1986) is a South Korean professional baseball pitcher for the Lotte Giants of the KBO League.
