= List of KBO League no-hitters =

In baseball, throwing a no-hitter is a pitching accomplishment in which one or more pitchers does not yield a hit in the course of one game. A no-hitter is rare in the South Korean KBO League, occurring 17 times since Bang Soo-Won's first no hitter in 1984. Among them, no-hitter has been recorded as a shutout 14 times, and combined no-hitter has been recorded three times.

Unlike in Major League Baseball (MLB), combined no-hitters are not considered as official no-hitters by KBO. And in the KBO League, no-hitter recorded in the postseason is treated separately as an unofficial record.

== KBO League no-hitters ==
=== No-hitters with complete game shutout win in pennant race ===
Date	Pitcher	Club	Score	Opponent	Ballpark	Notes
May 5, 1984	Bang Soo-won	Haitai Tigers	5–0	Sammi Superstars	Gwangju Mudeung Baseball Stadium	
June 5, 1986	Kim Jeong-haeng	Lotte Giants	8–0	Binggrae Eagles	Sajik Baseball Stadium	First game of Doubleheader
April 2, 1988	Jang Ho-yeon	OB Bears	4–0	Lotte Giants	Sajik Baseball Stadium	Opening day of the season
April 17, 1988	Lee Dong-seok	Binggrae Eagles	1–0	Haitai Tigers	Gwangju Mudeung Baseball Stadium	
July 6, 1989	Sun Dong-yol	Haitai Tigers	10–0	Samsung Lions	Gwangju Mudeung Baseball Stadium	
August 8, 1990	Lee Tae-il (baseball)	Samsung Lions	8–0	Lotte Giants	Sajik Baseball Stadium	
April 30, 1993	Kim Won-hyeong	Ssangbangwool Raiders	3–0	OB Bears	Jeonju Baseball Stadium	At age 20, Kim was the youngest KBO pitcher to ever throw a no-hitter
September 9, 1993	Kim Tae-won (baseball)	LG Twins	9–0	Ssangbangwool Raiders	Jamsil Baseball Stadium	
May 23, 1997	Jung Min-cheul	Hanwha Eagles	8–0	OB Bears	Jeonju Baseball Stadium	
May 18, 2000	Song Jin-woo	Hanwha Eagles	6–0	Haitai Tigers	Gwangju Mudeung Baseball Stadium	At age 34, Song was the oldest KBO pitcher to throw a no-hitter
June 25, 2014	Charlie Shirek	NC Dinos	6–0	LG Twins	Jamsil Baseball Stadium	First foreign player to throw a KBO League no-hitter
April 9, 2015	Yunesky Maya	Doosan Bears	1–0	Nexen Heroes	Jamsil Baseball Stadium	
June 30, 2016	Michael Bowden	Doosan Bears	4–0	NC Dinos	Jamsil Baseball Stadium	
April 21, 2019	Deck McGuire	Samsung Lions	16–0	Hanwha Eagles	Hanwha Life Insurance Eagles Park	

=== No-hitters in postseason ===
Date	Pitcher	Club	Score	Opponent	Ballpark	Notes
October 20, 1996	Jeong Myeong-won	Hyundai Unicorns	4–0	Haitai Tigers	Sungui Stadium	Game 4 of the Korean Series

=== Combined no-hitters ===
Date	Pitcher	Club	Score	Opponent	Ballpark	Notes
October 6, 2014	Shin Jung-rak; Yoo Won-sang; Shin Jae-Woong	LG Twins	1–0	NC Dinos	Jamsil Baseball Stadium	
April 2, 2022	Wilmer Font; Kim Taek-hyeong	SSG Landers	4–0	NC Dinos	Changwon NC Park	Opening day of the season
August 6, 2023	Aaron Wilkerson; Koo Seung-Min; Kim Won-Jung (baseball)	Lotte Giants	1–0	SSG Landers	Sajik Baseball Stadium	
April 15, 2025	Elieser Hernández; Kim Jin-sung; Park Myung-geun; Jang Hyun-sik	LG Twins	3–0	Samsung Lions	Jamsil Baseball Stadium	

=== Shortened no-hitters ===
Date	Pitcher	Club	Score	Opponent	Ballpark	Notes
May 13, 1993	Park Dong-Heui	Lotte Giants	4–0	Ssangbangwool Raiders	Sajik Baseball Stadium	5 innings, 1BB
