= List of foreign KBO League players =

The following is a list of expatriate players who have played in the KBO League baseball in South Korea.

== Players ==
Current KBO League players
Player	Hangul	Nationality	Position	Debut	Teams	Salary	Games	Ref(s)
					Samsung Lions			
					KT Wiz			
					Kia Tigers			
Austin Dean	오스틴 딘	United States	1B	April 1, 2023	LG Twins	$2,000,000	539	
Tristan Beck	트리스탄 벡	United States	P	–	LG Twins	$878,000	–	
					Doosan Bears			
Takuto Takada	타쿠토 타카다	Japan	P	June 11, 2026	Doosan Bears	$220,000	39	
Pedro Ávila	페드로 아빌라	Venezuela	P	July 16, 2026	SSG Landers	$3,100,000	14	
Lyon Richardson	라이언 리차드슨	United States	P	–	SSG Landers	$1,000,000	–	
					Lotte Giants			
					NC Dinos			
Troy Watson	트로이 왓슨	United States	P	–	Hanwha Eagles	$1,000,000	–	
Wang Yan-cheng	왕옌청	Republic of China	P	March 29, 2026	Hanwha Eagles	$300,000	26	
Raúl Alcántara	라울 알칸타라	Dominican Republic	P	March 30, 2019	Kiwoom Heroes	$900,000	145	
Matt Davidson	맷 데이비슨	United States	1B	March 23, 2024	Kiwoom Heroes	$1,100,000	367	
Keston Hiura	케스턴 히우라	United States	LF	May 3, 2026	Kiwoom Heroes	$800,000	72	
Kōji Fukutani	코지 후쿠타니	Japan	P	–	Kiwoom Heroes	$200,000	–	

- Games section is a count he playing his KBO team at the end of the last season.

Expatriate KBO League players
Player	Hangul	Nationality	Position	Debut	Teams	Final game	Games	Ref(s)
Jon Adkins	애킨스	United States	P	April 4, 2009	Lotte Giants	September 22, 2009	50	
Andrew Albers	앨버스	Canada	P	April 2, 2014	Hanwha Eagles	October 17, 2014	28	
Izzy Alcántara	알칸트라	Dominican Republic	OF	June 13, 2003	LG Twins; Doosan Bears	October 4, 2004	116	
Cory Aldridge	알드리지	United States	OF	April 2, 2011	Nexen Heroes	October 2, 2011	117	
Mike Anderson	앤더슨	United States	P	1998	LG Twins; Ssangbangwool Raiders	1999	64	
Luis Andújar	루이스	Dominican Republic	P	April 10, 2001	Kia Tigers	April 26, 2001	4	
Jairo Asencio	어센시오	Dominican Republic	P	March 29, 2014	Kia Tigers	October 8, 2014	46	
Adrian Burnside	번사이드	Australia	P	March 30, 2010	Woori Heroes	September 17, 2010	29	
Jason Scobie	스코비	United States	P	May 19, 2007	Kia Tigers; Woori Heroes	May 29, 2008	33	
Shingo Takatsu	다카쓰	Japan	P	June 24, 2008	Woori Heroes	October 1, 2008	18	
