= Austin Dean =

American baseball player (born 1993)

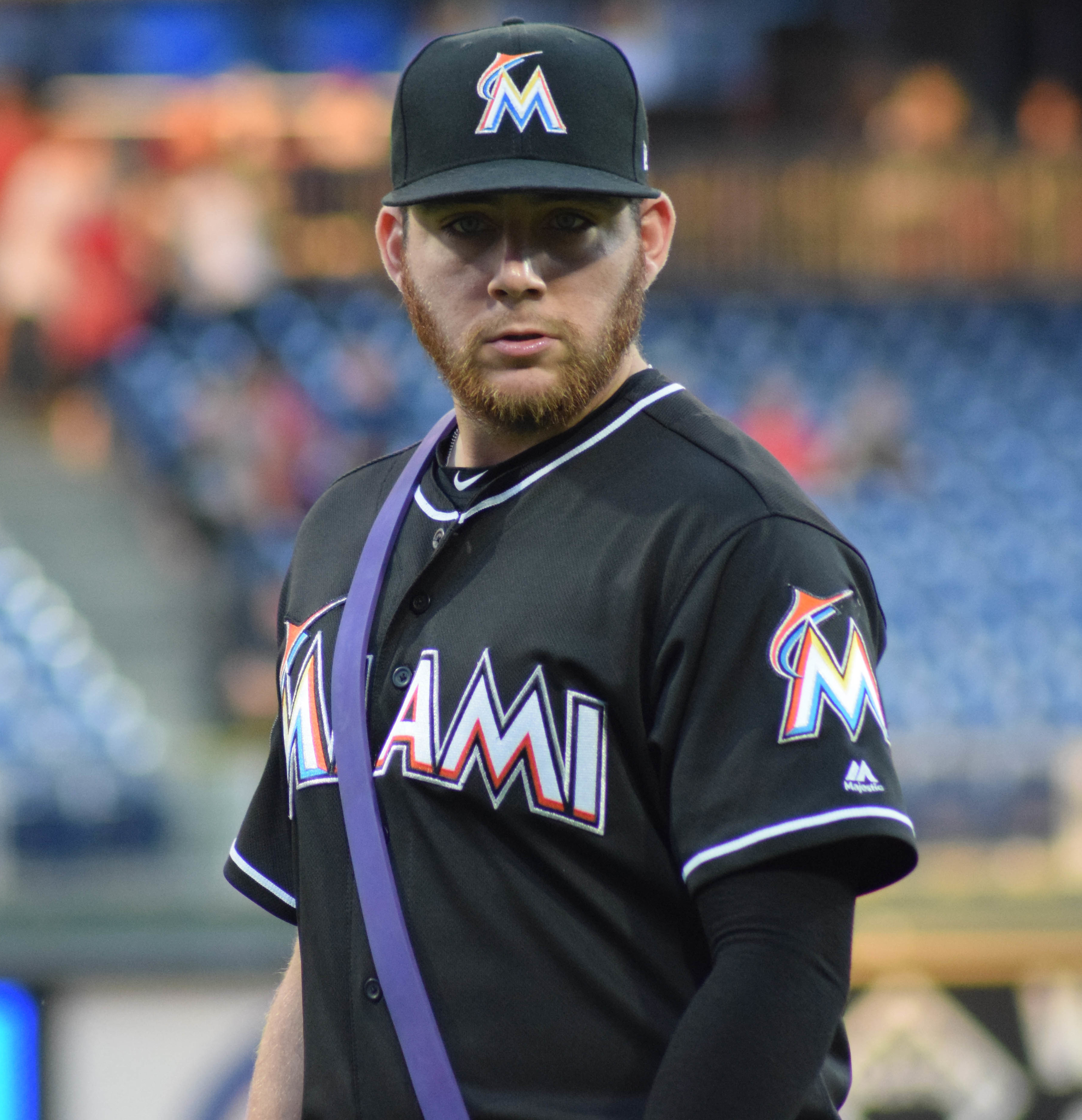
- Dean with the Miami Marlins in 2018

LG Twins – No. 23
- Outfielder / First baseman
- Born: October 14, 1993 (age 33); Spring, Texas, U.S.
- Bats: Right Throws: Right

Professional debut
- MLB: August 15, 2018, for the Miami Marlins
- KBO: April 1, 2023, for the LG Twins

MLB statistics (through 2022 season)
- Batting average: .228
- Home runs: 11
- Runs batted in: 42

KBO statistics (through August 21, 2026)
- Batting average: .319
- Home runs: 118
- Runs batted in: 421
- Stats at Baseball Reference

Teams
- Miami Marlins (2018–2019); St. Louis Cardinals (2020–2021); San Francisco Giants (2022); LG Twins (2023–present)

Career highlights and awards
- KBO: 2× KBO All-Star (2025–2026); KBO Home Run Derby Champion (2024); 2× Korean Series champion (2023, 2025); KBO Golden Glove Award (2023–-2024); KBO Cycles Hit (2026); KBO Defensive Award (2026)

Austin James Dean (born October 14, 1993) is an American professional baseball outfielder and first baseman for the LG Twins of the KBO League. He was drafted by the Miami Marlins in the fourth round of the 2012 Major League Baseball draft. He made his Major League Baseball (MLB) debut in 2018 with the Marlins and has also played for the St. Louis Cardinals and San Francisco Giants.

== Career ==
=== Amateur career ===
Dean was born in Spring, Texas. In his senior year at Klein Collins High School in Spring, Dean hit .379 with 10 doubles, 12 home runs, and 44 RBI, and was a second-team All American selection, while playing third base.

=== Miami Marlins ===
The Miami Marlins selected Dean in the fourth round of the 2012 Major League Baseball draft out of high school. He signed for $367,200, forgoing his commitment to play college baseball at the University of Texas. The Marlins converted him from an infielder to an outfielder.

Dean made his professional debut in 2012 with the rookie-level Gulf Coast Marlins, batting .223/.337/.338 with two home runs and 15 RBI in 148 at bats over 47 games. In 2013, he played for the Low–A Batavia Muckdogs and the Single–A Greensboro Grasshoppers, batted a combined .262/.327/.416 with three home runs and 22 RBI in 233 at–bats over 63 total games.

In 2014, he returned to Greensboro, slashing .308/.371/.444 with nine home runs and 58 RBI in 403 at–bats over 99 games. His 24.7% line drive percentage was third-best in the league. During the season he injured his right hand during a slide, later suffered a nasal fracture when he was hit by a pitch, and later again hit the injured list, this time with a groin strain.

He spent 2015 with the High–A Jupiter Hammerheads where he batted .268/.318/.366 with 67 runs (4th in the Florida State League), a career-high 32 doubles (2nd), five home runs, 52 RBI, 10 sacrifice flies (leading the league), and a career-high 18 stolen bases (though he was caught stealing 10 times) in 515 at–bats over 136 games. In the Arizona Fall League, playing for Mesa he batted .323/.364/.452 with one home run and seven RBI in 62 at–bats. He was an AFL Rising Star in 2015.

Dean spent 2016 with the Double–A Jacksonville Jumbo Shrimp where he compiled a .238/.307/.375 slash line with 11 home runs and 67 RBI in 480 at–bats over 130 games. He was a Southern mid-season All-Star and an MILB.com Organization All-Star in 2016. Dean spent 2017 back with Jacksonville where he batted .282/.323/.427 with four home runs and 30 RBI in 234 at–bats over 61 games. He broke his right hand in an outfield collision and missed almost three months of the season.

Dean made his Major League debut on August 15, 2018, against the Atlanta Braves, going 0–for–3. In his first Major League season, Dean hit .221/.279/.363 with 16 runs scored, four home runs, and 14 RBI in 113 at–bats over 34 games in left field. In 2018 in the minors for Jacksonville and Triple–A New Orleans he batted .345/.410/.511 with 71 runs, 12 homes runs, and 68 RBI in 397 at–bats over 109 games. He was an MILB.com Organization All-Star in 2018.

In 2019 with Miami, Dean batted .225/.261/.404 with six home runs and 21 RBI in 178 at–bats. That season with New Orleans he batted .337/.401/.635 with 18 home runs and 57 RBI in 252 at–bats over 73 games; he also was 1–for–3 for the GCL Marlins.

=== St. Louis Cardinals ===
On January 14, 2020, Dean was traded to the St. Louis Cardinals in exchange for Diowill Burgos. He appeared in only three games during the season, going one-for-four with three walks, while missing time due to injury. During the season he was put on the injured list with a right elbow strain.

In 2021 with the St. Louis Cardinals he batted .233/.342/.400 with one home run and 7 RBI in 30 at–bats in 22 games. In the minors, with the Triple–A Memphis Redbirds and Single–A Palm Beach Cardinals, he batted .246/.368/.456 with two home runs and 10 RBI in 87 at–bats over 18 games. During the season he suffered a fractured left wrist.

Through 2021, in the major leagues, he had played 83 games in left field, 9 in right field, and 6 at first base. In the minors he had played 491 games in left field, 142 in right field, 26 at first base, and 14 in center field.

=== San Francisco Giants ===
On November 5, 2021, Dean was claimed off waivers by the San Francisco Giants. He was designated for assignment on March 20, 2022, to create room for the newly signed Matthew Boyd, and was later sent outright to the Triple–A Sacramento River Cats on March 27. With the Sacramento, he slashed .268/.345/.467 in 392 at–bats, with 68 runs, 5 triples (10th in the Pacific Coast League), 17 home runs, 55 RBI, and 10 stolen bases in 12 attempts. He played 59 games in right field, 27 in left field, 16 at DH, 8 in center field, and 6 at first base.

On September 9, Dean had his contract selected to the active roster. In 3 games for the Giants, he went 3–for–8 with a walk. On November 9, Dean was removed from the 40–man roster and sent outright to Triple–A Sacramento.

=== LG Twins ===
On December 22, 2022, Dean signed with the LG Twins of the KBO League. Dean was named a KBO All-Star in 2023. In 139 games for the Twins, he batted .314/.376/.517 with 23 home runs, 95 RBI, and seven stolen bases.

On November 16, 2023, Dean re–signed with the Twins on a one–year, $1.3 million contract. In 140 games for the Twins in 2024, he slashed .319/.384/.573 with 32 home runs, 132 RBI, and 12 stolen bases.

On November 28, 2024, Dean re–signed with the team on a $1.7 million contract. He played in 116 games for the team in 2025, batting .313/.393/.595 with 31 home runs and 95 RBI. With the Twins, Dean won the 2025 Korean Series.

On December 6, 2025, Dean re-signed with the Twins on a one-year contract. He played in 144 games for the team in 2026, batting .331/.427/.635 with 41 home runs and 127 RBI, and 5 stolen bases.

On November 13, 2026, Dean re-signed with the Twins on a one-year contract with $2 million and he becomes a highest-paid in KBO foreign hitter.
