= Kim Won-hyong =

South Korean baseball player and coach (born 1972)

Doosan Bears
- Pitcher / Coach / Manager
- Born: July 5, 1972 (age 54); Jeonju, South Korea
- Batted: Right Threw: Right

KBO debut
- 1991, for the Ssangbangwool Raiders

Last KBO appearance
- September 24, 2010, for the SK Wyverns

KBO statistics
- Win–loss record: 134–144
- Earned run average: 3.92
- Strikeouts: 1,246
- Stats at Baseball Reference

Teams
- As player: Ssangbangwool Raiders (1991–1999); SK Wyverns (2000–2011); As coach: SK Wyverns (2011, 2014–2016); SK Wyverns Rookie Team (2012–2013); Lotte Giants (2017–2018); Doosan Bears (2019–2020); Fukuoka SoftBank Hawks 2nd Team (2024); As Manager: SK Wyverns/SSG Landers (2021–2023); Doosan Bears (2026–present)

Career highlights and awards
- As player: no-hit no-run (1993); 2x Korean Series champion (2007, 2008); As coach: Korean Series champion (2019); As manager: Korean Series champion (2022); Korean Series manager of the year (2022)
Medals
Asian Games
Representing South Korea
Gold medal – first place	1998 Bangkok	Team

- Kim Won-hyong
- Hangul: 김원형
- Hanja: 金圓衡
- RR: Gim Wonhyeong
- MR: Kim Wŏnhyŏng

Kim Won-hyong (Korean: 김원형; born July 5, 1972) is a South Korean former professional baseball pitcher and coach, who is currently the manager of the Doosan Bears. He is the youngest pitcher in the KBO to ever throw a no-hitter. Over his 20-year playing career, he pitched for the Ssangbangwool Raiders and the SSG Landers. A starting pitcher for most of his career, he converted to a reliever in his last few seasons. He won three Korean Series championships with the Wyverns.

== Career ==
Kim attended Jeonju High School, where he was a teammate of Park Kyung-oan, a future KBO MVP who also joined the Ssangbangwool Raiders the same year Kim did. Kim joined the KBO League in 1991 at age 18, the youngest pitcher in the league.

On April 30, 1993, at age 20, he threw a no-hitter, defeating the OB Bears 3–0 at Jeonju Baseball Stadium. Kim is the youngest KBO pitcher to ever throw a no-hitter.

In 1997 Kim finished in the top ten in the league with a 2.75 earned run average. Kim's best season was 1998, when he was mostly used as a relief pitcher for the Raiders and compiled a record of 12-7 with a 2.52 ERA and 13 saves. That year he finished fifth in the KBO in ERA. He also pitched for the South Korea national baseball team in the 1998 Asian Games, helping the country win the Gold Medal.

Kim played for the Raiders during their entire existence in the KBO League, from 1991 to 1999. When the Raiders were disbanded after the 1999 season, many players, including Kim, joined the newly created team the SK Wyverns. Kim played for the Wyverns for the rest of his career.

2000 was a tough year for Kim as he finished 2-13 with a 5.81 ERA, tying for the league lead in losses. (He may have been suffering from continued effects of being struck in the head by a batted ball in 1999, which knocked him out of commission for much of that season. In addition, that year the Wyverns were a pitiful 44-86-3 for a winning percentage of .338.)

In 2005 Kim finished third in the KBO in victories with 14, and second in ERA. He was tied for fourth in victories in 2008 with 12 wins.

Kim finished his career with 134 victories and 1,246 strikeouts, putting him high on the KBO career lists in both categories. His 121 losses are second all-time in the KBO.

Kim was named head pitching coach of the Doosan Bears starting with the 2019 season.

== See also ==
- List of KBO career win leaders
- List of KBO career strikeout leaders
