= 2023 Korean Series =

Baseball championship series

Team (Wins)	Managers	Season
LG Twins (4)	Youm Kyoung-youb	86–56–2 (.606)
KT Wiz (1)	Lee Kang-chul	79–62–3 (.560)
- Dates: November 7 – 13
- Venue(s): Jamsil Baseball Stadium (LG Twins); Suwon Baseball Stadium (KT Wiz)
- MVP: Oh Ji-hwan (LG Twins)
- Umpires: Park Gi-taik, Park Geun-yeong, Jeon Il-su, Park Jong-cheol, Lee Min-ho, Kim Byeong-joo, Choi Su-won

Broadcast
- Television: KBS (South Korea – Korean); MBC (South Korea – Korean); SBS (South Korea – Korean)
- TV announcers: Kang Seung-hwa, Kwon Seong-wook, Park Yong-taik, Yoon Hee-sang and Jang Seong-ho (KBS); Han Myeong-jae, Kim Na-jin, Lee Sang-hoon, Jung Min-cheul, Park Jae-hong and Kim Sun-woo (MBC); Jeong Woo-yeong, Yoon Seong-ho, Lee Sun-cheol (SBS)

The 2023 Korean Series (known as 2023 Shinhan Bank SOL Korean Series for sponsorship reasons) was the championship series of the 2023 KBO League season. The series started on November 7 and ended on November 13.

The LG Twins clinched the best record of the 2023 season and advanced to the Korean Series. Twins won the regular season in 29 years, which is winning first time since 1994 regular season. Also it is first time to advance Korean Series since 2002 post season. This stage will be challenge for the Korean championship title in 29 years of Twins.

KT Wiz, who defeated the NC Dinos 3–2 in the KBO League playoffs, begun their regular season at near of bottom of the table, but succeed to rise their standing in June. At last the Wiz sealed the 2nd table in regular season before a week of season ending, and showed wizard's magic that directly advance to play off from bottom.

LG Twins won the Korean Series 4–1, for their first title in 29 years.

== Summary ==
LG Twins (4) vs. KT Wiz (1)

Game	Date	Score	Location	Time	Attendance
1	November 7	KT Wiz – 3, LG Twins – 2	Jamsil Baseball Stadium	3:14	23,750
2	November 8	KT Wiz – 4, LG Twins – 5	Jamsil Baseball Stadium	3:07	23,750
3	November 10	LG Twins – 8, KT Wiz – 7	Suwon Baseball Stadium	4:06	17,600
4	November 11	LG Twins – 15, KT Wiz – 4	Suwon Baseball Stadium	3:46	17,600
5	November 13	KT Wiz – 2, LG Twins – 6	Jamsil Baseball Stadium	2:56	23,750

== Matchups ==
=== Game 1 ===
November 7, 2023 18:30 KST at Jamsil Baseball Stadium in Seoul
Team	1	2	3	4	5	6	7	8	9	R	H	E
KT Wiz	1	0	0	1	0	0	0	0	1	3	7	1
LG Twins	2	0	0	0	0	0	0	0	0	2	7	4
WP: Son Dong-hyun (1–0) LP: Go Woo-suk (0–1) Sv: Park Yeong-hyun (1); Attendance: 23,750; Umpires: Park Gi-taik, Park Geun-yeong, Jeon Il-su, Park Jong-cheol, Lee Min-ho, Kim Byeong-joo; Boxscore

Wiz succeed to dominate the first game of the biggest stage. Moon Sang-cheol, the designated hitter of Wiz who flew out into the triple play at 2nd top, hit a 1 RBI double against Twins closer Go Woo-suk. Twins was beaten at their first game of the post season journey with 4 errors and broken closer.

=== Game 2 ===
November 8, 2023 18:30 KST at Jamsil Baseball Stadium in Seoul
Team	1	2	3	4	5	6	7	8	9	R	H	E
KT Wiz	4	0	0	0	0	0	0	0	0	4	8	0
LG Twins	0	0	1	0	0	1	1	2	0	5	10	0
WP: Ham Deok-ju (1–0) LP: Park Yeong-hyun (0–1) Sv: Go Woo-suk (1); Home runs: KT: None; LG: Oh Ji-hwan (Solo, 6th BOT, William Cuevas), Park Dong-won (2-run, 8th BOT, Park Yeong-hyun); Attendance: 23,750; Umpires: Kim Byeong-ju, Park Jong-cheol, Park Geun-yeong, Lee Min-ho, Chio Su-won, Jeon Il-soo; Boxscore

Twins tied the series with great bullpen pitchers and dramatic homer by Park Dong-won, transferred catcher from KIA Tigers before the season. Choi Won-tae, Twins's starting pitcher for 2nd leg conceded 4 scores at 1st top, pitching during 1/3 innings. But 6 Twins bullpenners, Lee Jeong-yong, Jeong Woo-yeong, Kim Jin-seong, Yu Yeong-chan and Ham Deok-ju blocked the Wiz batters without any losing scores in 8.2 innings, while batters constantly score at 3rd, 6th and 7th bot.

At the one-position-game, Park Dong-won hit breathtaking turning-table 2-run homer against Wiz closer Park Yeong-hyun in 8th bot. Go Woo-seok closed the game with 2 strike outs at 9th top, and Twins made their first Korean Series victory in 21 year, 7,670 days.

=== Game 3 ===
November 10, 2023 18:30 KST at Suwon Baseball Stadium in Suwon, Gyeonggi-do
Team	1	2	3	4	5	6	7	8	9	R	H	E
LG Twins	0	0	3	0	0	2	0	0	3	8	11	2
KT Wiz	0	0	1	0	3	0	0	3	0	7	15	1
WP: Go Woo-suk (1–1) LP: Kim Jae-yoon (0–1) Sv: Lee Jeong-yong (1); Home runs: LG: Austin Dean (1, 3-run, 3th TOP, Wes Benjamin), Park Dong-won (2, 2-run, 6th TOP, Son Dong-hyeon), Oh Ji-hwan (2, 3-run, 9th TOP, Kim Jae-yoon); KT: Park Byung-ho (1, 2-run, 8th BOT, Go Woo-seok); Attendance: 17,600; Umpires: Jeon Il-soo, Lee Min-ho, Park Jong-cheol, Chio Su-won, Park Gi-taik, Park Geun-yeong; Boxscore

One of the most memorable match in Korean Series history. Turning games happened 4 times.

Twins opened the scoring in the top of the third, when Austin Dean hit a three-run home run toward the left side pole to put the Twins leads 3–0. Wiz reversed the game with destroying the Twins bullpen which look like the iron wall at game 2. Kim Min-hyeok's 1-RBI single was followed by right-centre 1 RBI double by Anthony Alford that tie the game. After that, Jo Yong-ho's 1 RBI single took the turning game around to Wiz. Responding to Wiz's attack, Park Dong-won gave a one-run lead to Twins with two-run home run toward left outside of the stadium.

Wiz didn't want to make end of the game with the result, and returned the lead with 1 RBI double by Hwang Jae-gyun and dramatic two-run homer by Park Byeong-ho against Go Woo-suk.

At top of 9th, Kim Jae-yoon was sent to record the final three out counts for Wiz. Hong Chang-gi, the leadoff of Twins, hit the infield single, and after 2 out counts by Park Hae-min and Kim Hyeon-soo, Twins batter 2 and 3, the Wiz closer gave a walk to Austin Dean. The runners on first and second base with 2 out counts was loaded for Oh Ji-hwan, the captain of Twins who committed a crucial error on procedure of Wiz's scoring in bottom of the fifth. The captain shot an incredible 3-run homer that serve a lead 8–7 for Twins.

Go Woo-suk conceded hit-by-pitch to Kim Jun-tae, and single on the left field to Jeong Jun-yeong. With runners on first and second base at one out, pitcher was substituted with Lee Jeong-yong, who sent the runners to next bases with wild pitch as soon as appearing. Bae Jeong-dae got intentional walk, which made to face Kim Sang-su at full base. On the crisis of walk off, Lee Jeong-yong success to induce ground ball in front of pitcher, and the memorable game was ended with 1–2–3 double play.

Twins got series lead 2–1, and left only 2 victories to the Korean Series championship in 29 years with the championship rate of 85%.

=== Game 4 ===
November 11, 2023 14:00 KST at Suwon Baseball Stadium in Suwon, Gyeonggi-do
Team	1	2	3	4	5	6	7	8	9	R	H	E
LG Twins	2	0	0	0	1	2	7	3	0	15	17	0
KT Wiz	0	0	0	0	0	1	0	2	1	4	6	0
WP: Kim Yun-sik (1–0) LP: Um Sang-back (0–1); Home runs: LG: Kim Hyun-soo (1, 2-run, 1th TOP, Um Sang-back), Moon Bo-gyeong (1, 2-run, 6th TOP, Kim Jae-yoon), Oh Ji-hwan (3, 3-run, Ju Gwon); KT: None; Attendance: 17,600; Umpires: Park Geun-yeong, Choi Su-won, Lee Min-ho, Park Gi-taik, Kim Byeong-ju, Park Jong-cheol; Boxscore

Twins bombed all Wiz mound members with 17 hits and 15 scores, making their magic number just 1 for returning the Korean Series championship title in 29 years. Kim Yun-sik, the winning pitcher and man of the match who could not show good performance during regular season surprised all Twins fans with perfect pitching during 5 and 2/3 innings conceding only 1 score in bottom of sixth.

Kim Hyun-soo shot two-run homer toward right fence which takes a lead for Twins 2–0. Wiz succeed to prevent additional score conceding until 4th inning, but Hong Chang-gi got a single in front of right fielder against Kim Jae-yoon, which called Moon Seong-ju to home. The pitcher was hit two-run home run against Moon Bo-gyeong at top of 6th, and it made more score gap 5–1 for Twins.

Wiz tried to chase them with Hwang Jae-gyun's 1 RBI single that drove Kim Yoon-sik out from the mound. But Twins took the score pale beside with exploding the batters in top of 7th. Kim Hyun-soo's 1 RBI single, Oh Ji-hwan's three-run homer, Moon Seong-hu's 2 RBI Double and Shin Min-jae's sacrifice 1 RBI ground ball knocked out Wiz pitchers, and the Wiz looked like difficult to rise up from their ruins with Twins' lead 12–1. Twins recorded 8 batters hit in-a-row at the inning and it is the longest record in Korean Series history.

Twins added scores in top of 8th with Oh Ji-hwan's 1 RBI single, Moon Bo-gyeong's 1 RBI sacrifice fly out, and Heo Do-hwan's 1 RBI double toward near of left foul line. Wiz chased them with merry-go-round hit by pitch and walks in bottom of 8th, and Lee Ho-yeon's 1 RBI sacrifice fly out in 9th BOT, but it was too late to make different result of the game.

Twins got a chance to win the Korean Series at their home ground with pinstripe jersey for the first time in their franchise history.

=== Game 5 ===
November 13, 2023 18:30 KST at Jamsil Baseball Stadium, Seoul
Team	1	2	3	4	5	6	7	8	9	R	H	E
KT Wiz	0	0	0	0	1	0	1	0	0	2	7	3
LG Twins	0	0	3	0	2	1	0	0	0	6	11	2
WP: Casey Kelly (1–0) LP: Ko Young-pyo (0–1); Attendance: 23,750; Umpires: Park Jong-cheol, Park Gi-taik, Choi Su-won, Kim Byeong-ju, Jeon Il-soo, Lee Min-ho; Boxscore

Starting pitchers, the aces of both team leaded tie in early of the game. But in bottom of third, the runners was loaded in second and third base for Park Hae-min, who took 2 RBI double toward near of right foul line. Jamsil baseball stadium was in crowd atmosphere, and it was kept with stealing third base by Park Hae-min. He served third score for Twins while Park Byeong-ho committed error while catching Kim Hyun-soo's ground ball.

Kelly pitched wild in top of fifth, which give a score to Wiz. But Twins loaded the runners at first and third base with Hong Chang-gi and Park Hae-min's on-base that sent the starting pitcher to dug out, followed by Kim Hyun-soo's 2 RBI single toward left field and Twins leads 1–5. Moon Seong-ju's 1 RBI single toward right field extended the score gap.

Wiz added a score when Yoo Yeong-chan allowed wild pitch again in 7th TOP, but nothing except it. Go Woo-seok appeared on the mound in 9th TOP to make final of the 2023 season, and he caught Park Gyeong-soo and Jo Yong-ho with third base foul fly out and swung strike out. And on 2–2 pitch count, Shin Min-jae caught the liner ball from Bae Jeong-dae, and it was the moment that Twins waved their championship flag in 29 years.

== See also ==
- 2023 Japan Series
- 2023 World Series
