= Kim Yong-soo =

South Korean baseball player and coach

Kim Yong-soo 김용수

LG Twins – No. 41
- Pitcher
- Born: May 2, 1960 (age 65); Seoul, South Korea
- Batted: Right Threw: Right

KBO debut
- 1985, for the MBC Chungyong

Last appearance
- 2000, for the LG Twins

KBO statistics
- Win–loss record: 126–89
- Earned run average: 2.98
- Strikeouts: 1,146
- Saves: 227
- Stats at Baseball Reference

Teams
- As player: MBC Blue Dragons (1985–1989); LG Twins (1990–2000); As coach: LG Twins (2002–2004, 2006–2009)

Career highlights and awards
- League championships (1990, 1994); Korean Series (1990, 1994)

Kim Yong-soo (Korean: 김용수, born May 2, 1960) is a former South Korean baseball pitcher and coach. Kim was part of the 1984 Olympic team. He won two Korean Series most valuable player awards, and was three times the top saver and once the top winner in the Korea Baseball Organization.

== Biography ==
Kim started his international career at the 1983 Intercontinental Cup. The same year he played the first round of the 1983 draft for MBC Blue Dragons, but did not sign a contract. Next year he took part in the Amateur World Series and 1984 Summer Olympics, where baseball was a demonstration sport. He turned professional in 1985 and played for the Dragons until retiring in 2000. The team changed its name to LG Twins in 1990. Until 2012, he remained a high KBO League scorer in several categories, including saves and saves points (first); number of wins (6th); games pitched, earned run average and innings pitched (8th); and winning percentage (10th).

In retirement, between 2002 and 2009 Kim worked as a pitching coach and scout for the Twins, until becoming the head baseball coach at Chung-Ang University in 2010.

== See also ==
- List of KBO career win leaders
- List of KBO career saves leaders
