= Chuncheon Baseball Stadium =

Baseball stadium in Chuncheon, South Korea

- Interactive map of Chuncheon Baseball Stadium
- Location: Songam-dong, Chuncheon, South Korea
- Coordinates: 37.85329°N 127.68995°E
- Owner: Chuncheon
- Capacity: 10,000
- Surface: Grass
- Field size: Left Field - 95 m Center Field - 120 m Right Field - 95 m

Construction
- Opened: 2004

Tenants
- Sammi Superstars (KBO) (1982-1985), Chungbo Pintos (KBO) (1985-1987)

- Chuncheon Baseball Stadium
- Hangul: 의암야구장
- Hanja: 衣岩野球場
- RR: Uiam yagujang
- MR: Ŭiam yagujang

Chuncheon Baseball Stadium is a baseball stadium in Chuncheon, South Korea. It is used mostly for baseball games and is the second home stadium of Sammi Superstars and Chungbo Pintos.
