= Melqui Torres =

- Pitcher
- Born: May 27, 1977 (age 48); San Pedro de Macorís, Dominican Republic
- Batted: Right Threw: Right

KBO debut
- 2002, for the Hyundai Unicorns

Last KBO appearance
- 2002, for the Hyundai Unicorns
- Stats at Baseball Reference

Teams
- Hyundai Unicorns (2002)

Melquicedec Torres (born May 27, 1977) is a Dominican former professional baseball pitcher. He played one year for the Hyundai Unicorns of the Korea Baseball Organization. He is the younger brother of pitcher Salomón Torres.

== Minor league career ==
Torres was signed as an undrafted free agent by the Seattle Mariners in 1996. He began his career in American baseball in 1997 with their Rookie League AZL Mariners. He advanced to the Class A (Short Season) Everett AquaSox in 1998 and to the Class A Wisconsin Timber Rattlers in 1999. He began 2000 in Wisconsin, but was later promoted to the Class A-Advanced Lancaster JetHawks and then the Triple-A Tacoma Rainiers. He returned to the Mariners' new Class-A Advanced team, the San Bernardino Stampede, 2001. In 2002, Torres pitched in Hyundai Unicorns, Korea.

He signed with the Pittsburgh Pirates organization in 2003, and was assigned to their Class A-Advanced Lynchburg Hillcats. He was granted free agency following the season. Though he signed a minor league contract with the Tampa Bay Devil Rays in 2004, he was released prior to the start of the season. He later signed a minor league contract with the Baltimore Orioles in 2005. That season, he played with their Class-A Advanced Frederick Keys and Double-A Bowie Baysox.

In 2007, Torres played for the Vaqueros Laguna and Piratas de Campeche of the Liga Mexicana de Beisbol. In January 2008, he was signed to a minor league contract by the Milwaukee Brewers organization and was assigned to their Triple-A Nashville Sounds.
