= Gim Jinseong =

Gim Jinseong (Korean: 김진성) may refer to:

- Kim Jin-sung (born 1985), South Korean baseball player
- Kim Jin-seong (born 2001), South Korean actor
