= Baek In-chun =

South Korean baseball player and manager (1942–2026)

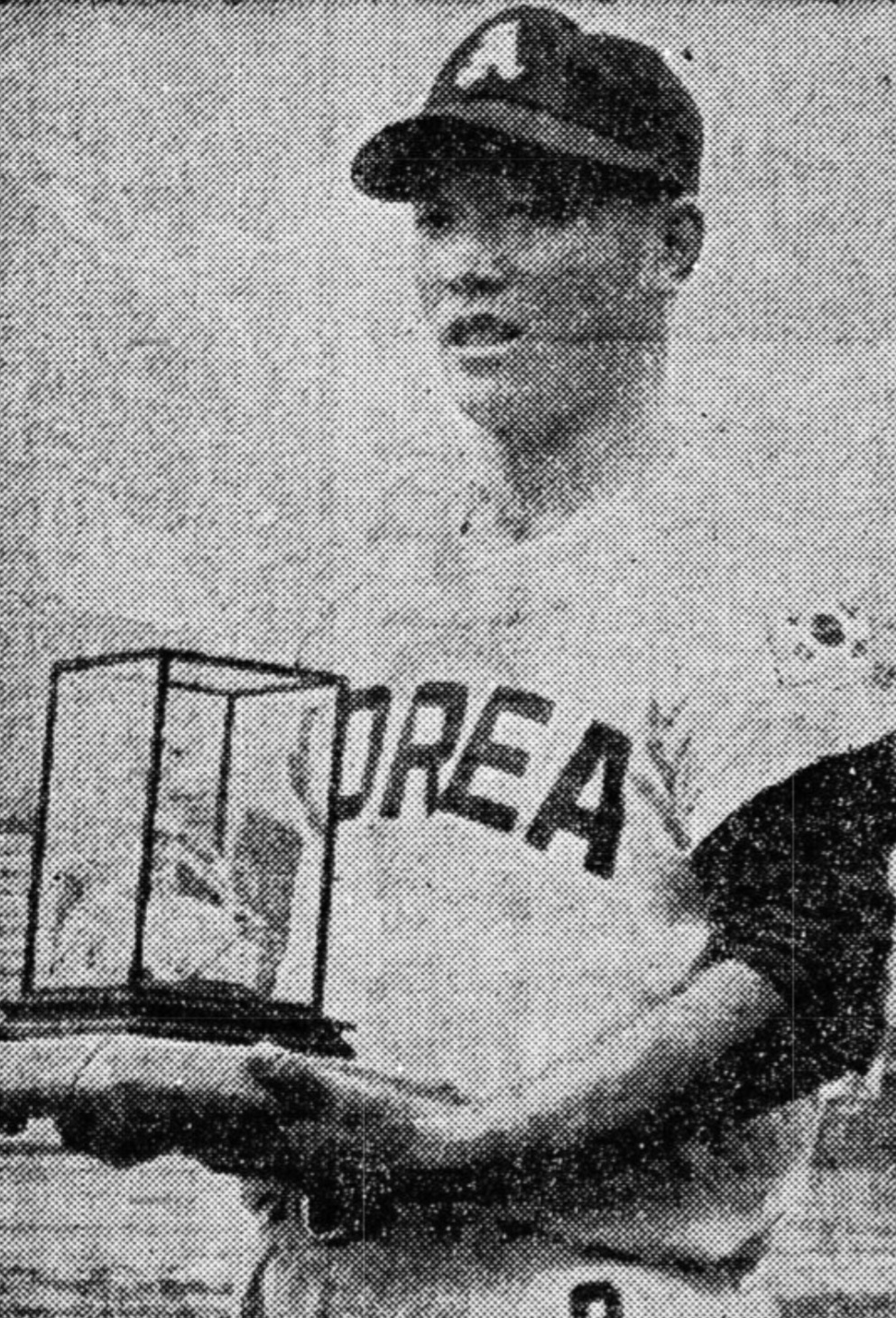
- Baek in 1962
- Catcher, outfielder
- Born: 27 September 1942; Wuxi, Jiangsu, China
- Died: 15 August 2026 (aged 83); Cheonan, South Chungcheong Province, South Korea
- Batted: Right Threw: Right

Professional debut
- NPB: 26 June, 1963, for the Toei Flyers
- KBO: 27 March, 1982, for the MBC Chungyong

Last appearance
- NPB: 1981, for the Kintetsu Buffaloes
- KBO: 1984, for the Sammi Superstars

NPB statistics
- Batting average: .278
- Home runs: 209
- RBI: 776
- Hits: 1831

KBO statistics
- Batting average: .335
- Home runs: 23
- RBI: 91
- Hits: 135
- Stats at Baseball Reference

Teams
- As player: Toei Flyers / Nittaku Home Flyers / Nippon-Ham Fighters (1962–1974); Taiheiyo Club Lions (1975–1976); Lotte Orions (1977–1980); Kintetsu Buffaloes (1981); MBC Chungyong (1982); Sammi Superstars (1983–1984); As coach: Sammi Superstars (1983–1984); Hanwha Eagles (1999); SK Wyverns (2002); As manager: MBC Chungyong (1982, 1989); LG Twins (1990–1991); Samsung Lions (1995–1997); Lotte Giants (2002–2003)

Career highlights and awards
- NPB Pacific League batting champion (1985); KBO batting champion and single-season batting average record: .412 (1982); As manager, winner of the Korean Series (LG Twins, 1990)

- Baek In-chun
- Hangul: 백인천
- Hanja: 白仁天
- RR: Baek Incheon
- MR: Paek Inch'ŏn

Baek In-chun (Korean: 백인천; 13 September 1942 – 15 August 2026) was a South Korean professional baseball catcher, outfielder, player-manager and manager. Baek spent most of his career playing in Nippon Professional Baseball. He finished his career in Korea with the KBO League and then got into managing. Baek held the KBO record for highest batting average in a season; as a manager he led the LG Twins to their first KBO championship.

== Background ==
An ethnic Korean, Baek was born in Wuxi, Jiangsu, Republic of China, but as a youngster emigrated to Japan, where he attended Tokyo High School.

On 14 August 2026, Baek was found in a state of cardiac arrest at his home in Cheonan. He was pronounced dead at around 6:30 AM at a local hospital but revived and underwent medical treatment a few hours later on the same day. He died from complications on the morning of 15 August despite treatment. Baek was 83.

== Career ==
=== NPB ===
In 1962, at age 19, Baek joined Nippon Professional Baseball (NPB) as a catcher for the Toei Flyers. (Baek was one of the first Koreans to play professional baseball in Japan, joining the great Isao Harimoto [birth name Jang Hun], who had joined the Flyers beginning in 1959.) In his first year, the Flyers won their first (and only) Japan Series championship, defeating the Hanshin Tigers. Baek played for the franchise for the next 13 years (the team went through a number of sponsors and name changes, becoming the Nittaku Home Flyers and then the Nippon-Ham Fighters), starting out as a catcher but after a few years converting to a slugging, speedy outfielder.

After being let go by the Fighters after the 1974 season, Baek played seven more seasons in the NPB, for the Taiheiyo Club Lions, the Lotte Orions, and the Kintetsu Buffaloes. For the Lions, he won the 1975 Pacific League batting title with a .319 average and was declared a 1975 Best Nine Award outfielder. He had one of his best seasons in 1979, at age 35, as he hit .340 with 18 home runs and 71 RBI for the Orions.

Over the course of his career in the NPB, Baek hit 209 home runs and stole 212 bases.

=== KBO ===
In 1982, South Korea entered the realm of professional baseball with the KBO League, and the veteran Baek moved to his ethnic homeland to join the league — as the player-manager of MBC Chungyong. (As a new professional league, the KBO was eager to learn from the experiences of those who had played professionally in Japan.) Incredibly, in his first year the 38-year-old led the league in hitting in 1982, with a batting average of .412 — still a KBO record (although in only 298 plate appearances). That year Baek also led the KBO in runs, hits, doubles, and slugging percentage.

After one season as player-manager of the Chungyong, in 1983 Baek joined the Sammi Superstars as a player-coach, lasting through the 1984 season, when he retired as a player.

In 1989, Baek returned to the KBO as a full-time manager, coming back to the Chungyong, which in 1990 became known as the LG Twins. In his second year, he led the Twins to their first KBO championship, defeating the Samsung Lions in the Korean Series. As a result, Baek was named the 1990 KBO Manager of the Year. Baek managed the Chungyong/Twins for three seasons, leaving after the 1991 season.

He managed the Samsung Lions from 1995 to 1997, and served as a coach for the Hanwha Eagles in 1999. He started 2002 as a coach for the SK Wyverns, but mid-way through the season took over as manager of the Lotte Giants, serving there through the 2003 season.
