= Shin Jung-rak =

South Korean baseball player (born 1987)

Lotte Giants – No. 36
- Relief pitcher
- Born: May 13, 1987 (age 39)
- Bats: Right Throws: Right

KBO debut
- March 27, 2010, LG Twins

KBO statistics (through 2023 season)
- Win–loss record: 27–26
- Earned run average: 5.25
- Strikeouts: 392
- Stats at Baseball Reference

Teams
- LG Twins (2010–2019); Hanwha Eagles (2019–2022); Lotte Giants (2023–present)

- Shin Jung-rak
- Hangul: 신정락
- Hanja: 申政洛
- RR: Sin Jeongrak
- MR: Sin Chŏngnak

Shin Jung-rak (Korean: 신정락; Hanja: 申政洛; born May 13, 1987, in Cheonan, Chungcheongnam-do) is a South Korean relief pitcher for the Lotte Giants of the KBO League. He bats and throws right-handed. Shin has an unorthodox style of sidearm delivery with a low-to-mid-90s fastball and a hard slider with extreme downward movement.

== Amateur career ==
Shin attended Bugil High School in Cheonan, Chungcheongnam-do.

Upon graduation from high school in 2006, he entered Korea University in Seoul. During his three-year college career at Korea University, Shin twice helped his team reach the final of the college national championship. His best collegiate season came in 2009, which he finished with a 6–2 record, a 1.32 ERA and three saves as a starter and closer, and was named MVP of the national championship tournament. That year, Shin was selected as a member of the South Korea national baseball team and competed in the Asian Baseball Championship held in Sapporo, Japan.

=== Notable international careers ===
Year	Venue	Competition	Team	Individual note
2009	Japan	Asian Baseball Championship	Bronze medal	1–0; 1.59 ERA (1 G, 5.2 IP, 1 ER, 7 K)

== Pro career ==
After his senior year at Korea University Shin, who did not allow any home run during his collegiate years, was drafted with the first overall pick of the 2010 KBO Draft by the LG Twins. He made his pro league debut on March 27, 2010, against the Samsung Lions. In that game, Shin got his first hold, tossing 0.1 innings of perfect relief.

On July 28, 2019, he and Song Eun-beom, then a member of the LG Twins, moved through a 1:1 trade.
