= 2023 KBO League season =

Professional baseball season in South Korea

2023 KBO League
- League: KBO League
- Sport: Baseball
- Defending champions: SSG Landers (2022)
- Duration: April 1 – October 17
- Number of games: 144 per team
- Number of teams: 10
- TV partner(s): KBS, MBC, SBS

Regular Season
- Season champions: LG Twins
- Season MVP: Erick Fedde (NC Dinos)

Postseason
- Wild Card champions: NC Dinos
- Wild Card runners-up: Doosan Bears
- Semi-playoffs champions: NC Dinos
- Semi-playoffs runners-up: SSG Landers
- Playoffs champions: KT Wiz
- Playoffs runners-up: NC Dinos

Korean Series
- Champions: LG Twins
- Runners-up: KT Wiz
- Finals MVP: Oh Ji-hwan

KBO League seasons
- ← 2022 2024 →

The 2023 KBO League season was the 42nd season in the history of the KBO League. The regular season began on April 1 and concluded on October 17. A postseason followed, culminating with the Korean Series championship. SSG Landers entered the season as the defending champions.

No changes were made to the league's makeup from the prior season, with the same ten teams competing. Each team played 144 games via facing every other team 16 times.

The LG Twins won both the regular season and the Korean Series.

== Transactions ==
=== Retirement ===
- On November 16, 2022, Shin Jae-young retired from professional baseball.
- On September 1, 2022, Na Ji-wan retired from professional baseball.

=== Draft ===
The 2023 Korea Baseball Organization draft took place on September 15, 2022, at Westin Josun Hotel, Jung-gu, Seoul.

== Preseason ==
The preseason began on March 13 and ended on March 28, 2023.

Preseason standings
Rank	Team	GP	W	L	D	PCT	GB	Home	Road
1	Hanwha Eagles	13	9	3	1	0.750	0	5–1–3	4–0–0
2	Samsung Lions	14	10	4	0	0.714	0	6–0–4	4–0–0
3	LG Twins	14	8	6	0	0.571	2	0–0–2	8–0–4
4	SSG Landers	13	5	5	3	0.500	3	0–0–0	5–3–5
4	KT Wiz	14	6	6	2	0.500	3	4–2–2	2–0–4
6	Kia Tigers	13	5	6	2	0.455	3.5	3–2–2	2–0–4
6	Doosan Bears	13	5	6	2	0.455	3.5	0–0–2	5–2–4
8	NC Dinos	13	4	7	2	0.364	4.5	3–1–5	1–1–2
9	Lotte Giants	13	4	8	1	0.333	5	3–1–6	1–0–2
10	Kiwoom Heroes	14	4	9	1	0.308	5.5	2–0–8	2–1–1

== Regular season ==
The regular season schedule was released on April 1, 2023.

Regular season standings
Rank	Team	GP	W	L	D	PCT	GB	Home	Road	Postseason
1	LG Twins	144	86	56	2	.606	—	45–25–1	41–31–1	Korean Series
2	KT Wiz	144	79	62	3	.560	6½	41–30–2	38–32–1	Playoff
3	SSG Landers	144	76	65	3	.539	9½	39–32–2	37–33–1	Semi-playoff
4	NC Dinos	144	75	67	2	.528	11	41–29–1	34–38–1	Wildcard Game
5	Doosan Bears	144	74	68	2	.521	12	37–35–1	37–33–1	Wildcard Game
6	Kia Tigers	144	73	69	2	.514	13	38–31–2	35–38–0	Did not qualify
7	Lotte Giants	144	68	76	0	.472	19	38–35–0	30–41–0	Did not qualify
8	Samsung Lions	144	61	82	1	.427	25½	32–39–0	29–43–1	Did not qualify
9	Hanwha Eagles	144	58	80	6	.420	26	32–40–1	26–40–5	Did not qualify
10	Kiwoom Heroes	144	58	83	3	.411	27½	33–36–2	25–47–1	Did not qualify

Note: Tie results are ignored by the league when computing winning percentage and games behind.

== Postseason ==
Wild Card
4	NC Dinos	2
5	Doosan Bears	0

Semi-playoff
3	SSG Landers	0
4	NC Dinos	3

Playoff
2	KT Wiz	3
4	NC Dinos	2

Korean Series
1	LG Twins	4
2	KT Wiz	1

=== Wild Card ===
The series started with a 1–0 advantage for the fourth-placed team.

NC Dinos (2) vs. Doosan Bears (0)

Game	Date	Score	Location	Time	Attendance
1	October 19	NC Dinos − 14, Doosan Bears − 9	Changwon NC Park	4:05	12,299

=== Semi-playoff ===
SSG Landers (0) vs. NC Dinos (3)

Game	Date	Score	Location	Time	Attendance
1	October 22	NC Dinos – 4, SSG Landers – 3	Incheon SSG Landers Field	2:46	22,500
2	October 23	NC Dinos – 7, SSG Landers – 3	Incheon SSG Landers Field	3:55	19,777
3	October 25	SSG Landers – 6, NC Dinos – 7	Changwon NC Park	4:02	16,649

=== Playoff ===
KT Wiz (3) vs. NC Dinos (2)

Game	Date	Score	Location	Time	Attendance
1	October 30	NC Dinos – 9, KT Wiz – 5	Suwon Baseball Stadium	3:15	16,241
2	October 31	NC Dinos – 3, KT Wiz – 2	Suwon Baseball Stadium	2:49	15,453
3	November 2	KT Wiz – 3, NC Dinos – 0	Changwon NC Park	3:07	17,400
4	November 3	KT Wiz – 11, NC Dinos – 2	Changwon NC Park	3:14	17,400
5	November 5	NC Dinos – 2, KT Wiz – 3	Suwon Baseball Stadium	2:51	17,329

=== Korean Series ===
LG Twins (4) vs. KT Wiz (1)

Game	Date	Score	Location	Time	Attendance
1	November 7	KT Wiz – 3, LG Twins – 2	Jamsil Baseball Stadium	3:14	23,750
2	November 8	KT Wiz – 4, LG Twins – 5	Jamsil Baseball Stadium	3:07	23,750
3	November 10	LG Twins – 8, KT Wiz – 7	Suwon Baseball Stadium	4:06	17,600
4	November 11	LG Twins – 15, KT Wiz – 4	Suwon Baseball Stadium	3:46	17,600
5	November 13	KT Wiz – 2, LG Twins – 6	Jamsil Baseball Stadium	2:56	23,750

== Attendances ==
#	Baseball club	Average attendance
1	LG Twins	16,939
2	SSG Landers	14,633
3	Doosan Bears	13,282
4	Lotte Giants	12,216
5	Samsung Lions	11,912
6	KIA Tigers	10,099
7	KT Wiz	9,553
8	Kiwoom Heroes	8,220
9	NC Dinos	7,854
10	Hanhwa Eagles	7,764
