= Lee Won-guk =

Lee Won-guk (Korean: 이원국) is a Korean name consisting of the family name Lee and the given name Won-guk, and may also refer to:

- Ernesto Carlos (born 1948), South Korean baseball player
- Won Kuk Lee (1907-2002), South Korean karateka
