= Hiroaki Fukushi =

Japanese baseball pitcher (1950–2005)

Hiroaki Fukushi 福士 敬章
- Pitcher
- Born: December 27, 1950; Tottori Prefecture, Japan
- Died: April 13, 2005 (aged 54); Wakayama Prefecture, Japan
- Batted: Right Threw: Right

Professional debut
- NPB: 1970, for the Yomiuri Giants
- KBO: 1983, for the Sammi Superstars

Last appearance
- NPB: 1982, for the Hiroshima Toyo Carp
- KBO: 1986, for the Binggrae Eagles

NPB statistics
- Win–loss record: 91–84
- ERA: 3.68
- Strikeouts: 785

KBO statistics
- Win–loss record: 55–79
- ERA: 3.56
- Strikeouts: 541

Teams
- Yomiuri Giants (1970–1972); Nankai Hawks (1973–1976); Hiroshima Toyo Carp (1977–1982); Sammi Superstars/Chungbo Pintos (1983–1985); Binggrae Eagles (1986)

Career highlights and awards
- NPB: 3× All-Star; 5× Japan Series champion (1970, 1971, 1972, 1979, 1980); KBO: Golden Glove Award (1983); KBO single-season records: Most wins — 30 (1983); Most complete games — 36 (1983); Most losses — 25 (1985)

- Hiroaki Fukushi
- Hangul: 장명부
- RR: Jang Myeongbu
- MR: Chang Myŏngbu

Akio Matsubara, known as Hiroaki Fukushi and Jang Myeong-bu (Korean: 장명부; December 27, 1950 – April 13, 2005) was a Japanese professional baseball pitcher who played Nippon Professional Baseball in Japan and KBO League baseball in South Korea. He holds KBO records for most wins and most complete games in a season, as well as most losses in a season.

== Career ==
Born December 27, 1950, Matsubara and attended Tottori Nishi High School, but was undrafted. Matsubara was signed as a 19-year-old by the Yomiuri Giants but got limited playing time over three seasons.

Before the 1973 season, he was traded to the Nankai Hawks, with whom he played for four years. Matsubara had some good seasons for the Hawks: in 1973 his 2.87 ERA was good for eighth-best in the Pacific League. He pitched in that year's Japan Series, taking the loss in one game against his old team, the Giants. Matsubara's 3.04 ERA in 1974 was tied for eighth-best in the Pacific League. In 1975 Matsubara's four shutouts tied for the Pacific League lead.

He pitched for the Hiroshima Toyo Carp from 1977 to 1982. In 1978, Matsubara made his first NPB All-Star game; his 12 complete games were tied for tops in the Central League, while his 3.60 ERA was ninth-best in the league. (He also allowed 236 hits, the most in the league.)

In 1979, he changed his name to Hiroaki Fukushi. Fukushi's 3.57 ERA in 1979 was eighth-best in the league, and the Carp made it to the Japan Series. He pitched brilliantly in game four of the series and went 1–0 with a 2.19 ERA as Hiroshima won the first title in their 30-year history. His 1980 season also went well, as he won 15 games and made his second All-Star team. He won game six of that year's Japan Series, which the Carp ended up winning to repeat as champions. Fukushi made his third All-Star team in 1981, but led the Central League in walks, runs allowed, and earned runs allowed. His 1982 season was a disappointing 3-13 and he was released afterward by the Carp.

Moving over to Korea to play in the nascent KBO League, he became known as Jang Myeong-bu (a transliteration of Zhang Akio). Pitching for the Sammi Superstars in 1983, Jang had one of the most remarkable seasons in pitching history. He pitched in 60 of the team's 100 games, completing a record 36 of them, with five shutouts. He threw 427-1/3 innings, facing 1,712 batters, allowing 388 hits, walking 106, and striking out 220 (at that point a KBO League record), with a 2.34 ERA. He won a still-league record 30 games, lost 16, and saved an additional six games. He threw 192-2/3 more innings and allowed 155 more hits than the runner-up in those categories. His 30 wins and 6 saves made up more than 69% of the team's 52 wins that year; for his efforts, he was given the 1983 KBO League Golden Glove Award in pitching.

Jang's 1984 season featured a respectable 3.30 ERA but 20 losses to go with 13 victories. His 1985 season included a league-record 25 losses to go with 11 wins and five saves.

Jang signed with the expansion Binggrae Eagles before the 1986 season but went 1–18 with a 4.98 ERA.

== Registered names ==
- 1969–1978 Akio Matsubara
- 1979–1982 Fukushi Hiroaki
- 1983–1986 Akio Zhang / Jang Myeong-bu
