= Jeonju Stadium =

Jeonju Stadium may refer to:

- Jeonju Baseball Stadium
- Jeonju Sports Complex Stadium
- Jeonju World Cup Stadium
