= Lee Byung-kyu =

South Korean baseball player (born 1974)

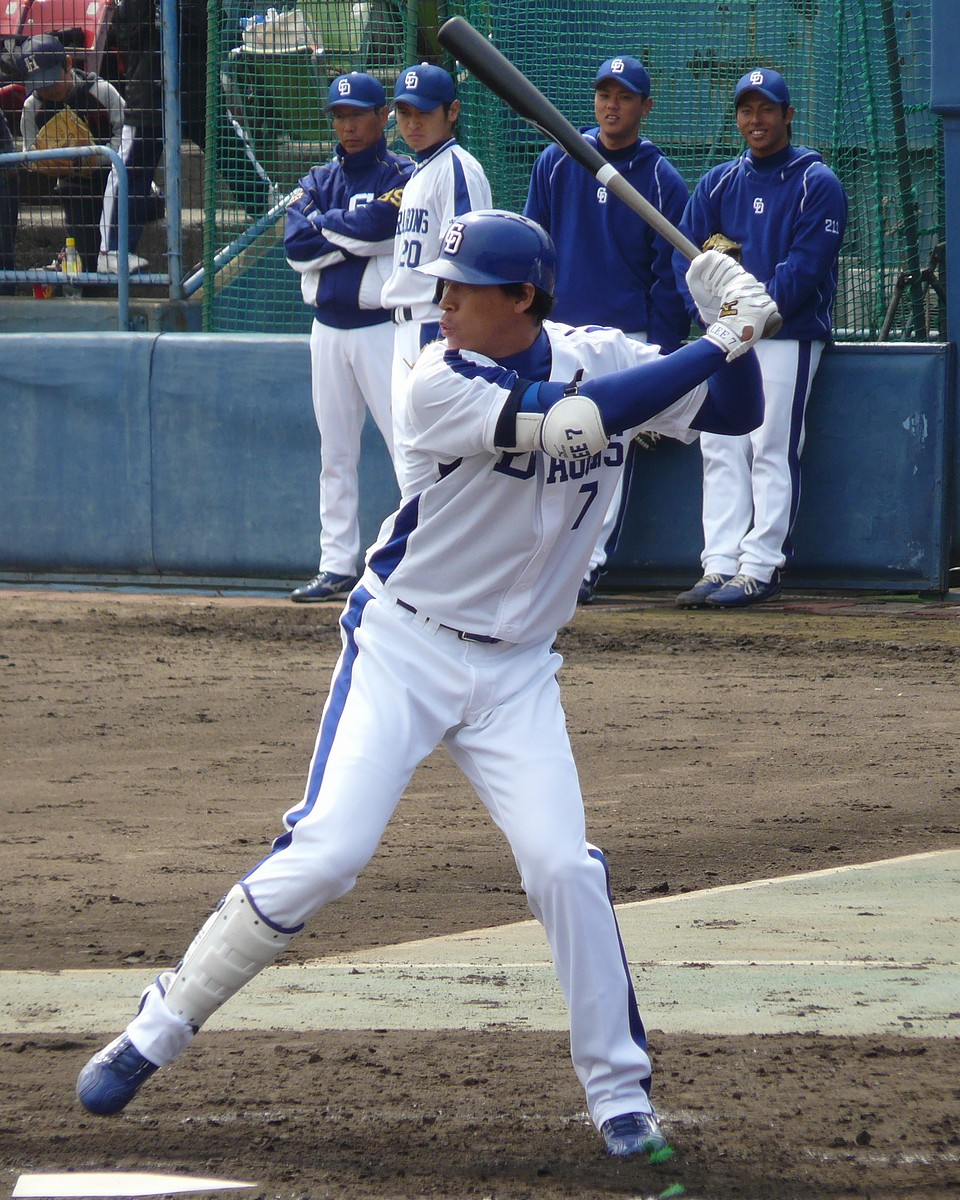
- March 2009

LG Twins – No. 79
- Outfielder
- Born: October 25, 1974 (age 51); Gimje, North Jeolla Province, South Korea
- Batted: Left Threw: Left

KBO debut
- April 12, 1997, for the LG Twins

Last appearance
- October 8, 2016, for the LG Twins

KBO statistics
- Batting average: .311
- Hits: 2,043
- Home runs: 161
- Runs batted in: 972

NPB statistics
- Batting average: .254
- Home runs: 28
- Runs batted in: 119
- Stats at Baseball Reference

Teams
- As player: LG Twins (1997–2006, 2010–2016); Chunichi Dragons (2007–2009); As manager/coach: LG Twins (2018–2022); Samsung Lions (2023–2024); LG Twins (2025–present)

Career highlights and awards
- KBO Rookie of the Year (1997); Japan Series champion (2007); 6x Golden Glove Award winner (1997, 1999–2001, 2004–2005)
Medals
Representing South Korea
Men's baseball
Olympic Games
Bronze medal – third place	2000 Sydney	Team

- Lee Byung-kyu
- Hangul: 이병규
- Hanja: 李炳圭
- RR: I Byeonggyu
- MR: I Pyŏnggyu

Lee Byung-kyu (born October 25, 1974) is a South Korean retired baseball player who played 17 seasons for the LG Twins of the KBO League, as well as three seasons with the Chunichi Dragons of Nippon Professional Baseball. He also competed in the 1996 Summer Olympics and in the 2000 Summer Olympics. He played as an outfielder.

Lee was a member of the South Korean team which finished eighth in the 1996 tournament. Four years later he was part of the South Korean baseball team which won the bronze medal.

Lee played for the LG Twins from 1997 to 2006 and then from 2010 to 2016. His number 9 was retired on July 9, 2017, in a ceremony that took place both before and after the game against the Hanwha Eagles.

== See also ==
- List of KBO career hits leaders
