= Ernesto Carlos =

South Korean-born Mexican baseball player

- Pitcher
- Born: Lee Won-kuk; May 10, 1948 (age 77); Seoul, South Korea
- Batted: Right Threw: Right

Professional debut
- NPB: August 19, 1966, for the Tokyo Orions
- KBO: April 5, 1983, for the MBC Chungyong

Last appearance
- NPB: August 19, 1967, for the Tokyo Orions
- KBO: September 28, 1983, for the MBC Chungyong

NPB statistics
- Win–loss record: 0–0
- Earned run average: 13.52
- Strikeouts: 0

KBO statistics
- Win–loss record: 1–1
- Earned run average: 4.42
- Strikeouts: 6

Teams
- Tokyo Orions (1967); MBC Chungyong (1983)

- Ernesto Carlos
- Hangul: 이원국
- RR: I Wonguk
- MR: I Wŏn'guk

Ernesto Carlos (born May 10, 1948 (Note: There are conflicting sources for the year of Carlos' birth. The Korea Baseball Organization states 1949. Baseball-Reference.com states 1948.)), born as Lee Won-kuk or Lee Won-guk (Korean: 이원국) and known in Japan as Pou Cho (菊茶), is a South Korea-born Mexican professional baseball player. Carlos is probably the first Korean player to be signed by a Major League Baseball franchise, and almost certainly the first person to play professional baseball in Japan, the United States, Mexico, and Korea, with the bulk of his career spent in the Mexican League. (He is a candidate for the Mexican Professional Baseball Hall of Fame.) He is also known as Ernesto Carlos Kuk Lee and Won Lee and Genkoku Lee and Wong Kuk Lee.

== Career ==
=== Amateur career ===
Carlos was born Lee Won-Kuk in Seoul, South Korea, and attended Choong Ang High School in Seoul, where he excelled in baseball. He grew to be 6'0" and 175 pounds.

=== Nippon Professional Baseball ===
With no professional league yet in Korea, Lee was signed in 1966 by the Tokyo Orions of Japan's Nippon Professional Baseball.

=== Minor League Baseball ===
Not finding success, Lee was released by the Orions and signed with the San Francisco Giants' affiliate the Fresno Giants in 1968. He played three seasons of Minor League Baseball, for the Giants and eventually the Jacksonville Suns, finishing with a record of 16-22, a 3.74 ERA, and 310 strikeouts in 378 innings.

=== Mexican League ===
Lee moved on to the Mexican League in 1972 where he found a home for the next ten years. Becoming known as "Ernesto Carlos," he eventually played for the Piratas de Sabinas, the Saraperos de Saltillo, the Mineros de Coahuila, the Águilas de Mexicali, the Acereros de Monclova, and the Petroleros de Poza Rica, spending the bulk of his time with the Mineros (1974-1979).

In 1975 Carlos' 20 losses (despite a 3.33 ERA) led the Mexican League. While with the Mineros in 1977, Carlos engaged in a memorable pitchers' duel with future Major Leaguer Babo Castillo of the Sultanes de Monterrey; the game ended 2-0 for Monterrey with Castillo pitching 18 innings and Carlos pitching 17-1/3. In 1979 Carlos went 19-14 with a 2.83 ERA, leading the league in starts (35) and innings (277), as well as hits allowed (285).

In 1979-1980, he played for Águilas de Mexicali of the Mexican Pacific League, leading the league in shutouts. In 1981, Carlos went 18-11 with an ERA of 2.36 and 3 saves, finishing second in the league in wins behind future Mexican League Hall of Famer Ralph Garcia.

Carlos finished his career with a Mexican League mark of 149-128 and a 2.81 ERA in 336 games. He compiled 1,126 strikeouts while only allowing 80 home runs in 2,103-1/3 innings. His 2.81 career ERA was the fourth-best in the Mexican League among pitchers with at least 2,000 innings. Carlos also holds the Mexican League record for most balks in a career, with 21.

=== KBO League ===
The KBO League was established in 1982, and in 1983, at age 35, Carlos/Lee returned to his homeland for his final season, when he pitched for MBC Chungyong.
