= Incheon Sungui Baseball Stadium =

1934–2008 stadium in South Korea

- Interactive map of Incheon Sungui Baseball Stadium
- Location: Dowon-dong, Jung-gu, Incheon, South Korea
- Coordinates: 37°28′00″N 126°38′34″E
- Owner: City of Incheon
- Operator: Incheon Metropolitan Facility Management Corporation
- Capacity: 12,000
- Field size: Left Field – 91 metres (299 ft); Right Field – 91 metres (299 ft); Center – 110 metres (361 ft)

Construction
- Opened: 1934
- Renovated: 1964, 1978, 1982, 1983, 1996, 1999
- Demolished: 2008

Tenants
- Hyundai Unicorns (1982–1999); SK Wyverns (2000–2001)

Sungui Baseball Stadium was a multi-purpose stadium in Incheon, South Korea. It was used mostly for baseball games. The stadium held 12,000 people and was built in 1934. It was part of Incheon Sungui Sports Complex. It was demolished in late 2008 and was replaced by an Incheon Football Stadium.

== See also ==
- Incheon Football Stadium
