= Kim Jin-sung (baseball) =

South Korean baseball player (born 1985)

LG Twins – No. 42
- Pitcher
- Born: March 7, 1985 (age 41); Seoul, South Korea
- Bats: Right Throws: Right

KBO debut
- April 3, 2013, for the NC Dinos

KBO statistics (through 2025 season)
- Win–loss record: 52–42
- Earned run average: 4.08
- Strikeouts: 761
- Saves: 40
- Stats at Baseball Reference

Teams
- NC Dinos (2013–2021); LG Twins (2022–present)

- Kim Jin-sung
- Hangul: 김진성
- Hanja: 金珍成
- RR: Gim Jinseong
- MR: Kim Chinsŏng

Kim Jin-sung (born March 7, 1985) is a South Korean professional baseball pitcher for the LG Twins of the KBO League.
