= Park Kyung-oan =

South Korean baseball player (born 1972)

- Catcher / Battery coach
- Born: July 11, 1972 (age 54); Jeonju, Jeollabuk-do, South Korea
- Batted: Right Threw: Right

KBO debut
- 1991, for the Ssangbangwool Raiders

Last KBO appearance
- 2013, for the SK Wyverns

KBO statistics
- Batting average: .249
- Home runs: 314
- RBI: 995
- Stats at Baseball Reference

Teams
- As player: Ssangbangwool Raiders (1991–1997); Hyundai Unicorns (1998–2002); SK Wyverns (2003–2013); As coach: SK Wyverns battery coach (2016–2018); LG Twins battery coach (2023–2025); As manager: SK Wyverns bench coach (2019–2020)

Career highlights and awards
- KBO MVP (2000); 4x KBO Golden Glove (1996, 1998, 2000, 2007); 5x Korean Series champion (1998, 2002, 2007, 2008, 2010)
Medals
Representing South Korea
Men's baseball
Olympic Games
| Bronze medal – third place | 2000 Sydney | Team |
World Baseball Classic
| Silver medal – second place | 2009 Los Angeles | Team |

- Park Kyung-oan
- Hangul: 박경완
- Hanja: 朴勍完
- RR: Bak Gyeongwan
- MR: Pak Kyŏngwan

Park Kyung-oan (born July 11, 1972) is a former South Korean baseball catcher and former Olympic bronze medalist. A four-time Golden Glove winner, Park is considered by many to be one of the best catchers in Korean baseball history. Playing for the Ssangbangwool Raiders, the Hyundai Unicorns, and the SK Wyverns during his career, his teams won five Korean Series championships.

== Professional career ==
Park started out his career as a member of the Ssangbangwool Raiders, playing for that team from 1991 to 1997, almost its entire existence. Park was then traded to the Hyundai Unicorns, where he played for the next five seasons. It was there, in the year 2000, where he had arguably the best season of his career, hitting .282 with 40 home runs, and winning the KBO League Most Valuable Player Award.

Park represented the Korean national baseball team in the 2009 World Baseball Classic, leading his team to second place.

In the 2010 season, Park became the first catcher in Korean baseball history to hit 300 career home runs. Park's 166 career hit-by-pitches are second-most in KBO history, after Choi Jeong.

Since 2013, Park has worked as the bench coach for the SK Wyverns.

== See also ==
- List of KBO career home run leaders
