= Um Sang-back =

South Korean baseball player (born 1996)

Hanwha Eagles – No. 11
- Pitcher
- Born: October 4, 1996 (age 29); Seoul, South Korea
- Bats: Right Throws: Right

KBO debut
- April 26, 2015, for the KT Wiz

Career statistics (through 2025 season)
- Win–loss record: 47-51
- Earned run average: 4.98
- Strikeouts: 744
- Stats at Baseball Reference

Teams
- KT Wiz (2015–2024); Hanwha Eagles (2025–present)

Um Sang-back (Korean: 엄상백; born October 4, 1996, in Seoul) is a South Korean pitcher for the Hanwha Eagles in the Korea Baseball Organization (KBO).
