= Sajik Baseball Stadium =

Baseball stadium in Busan, South Korea

- 사직야구장
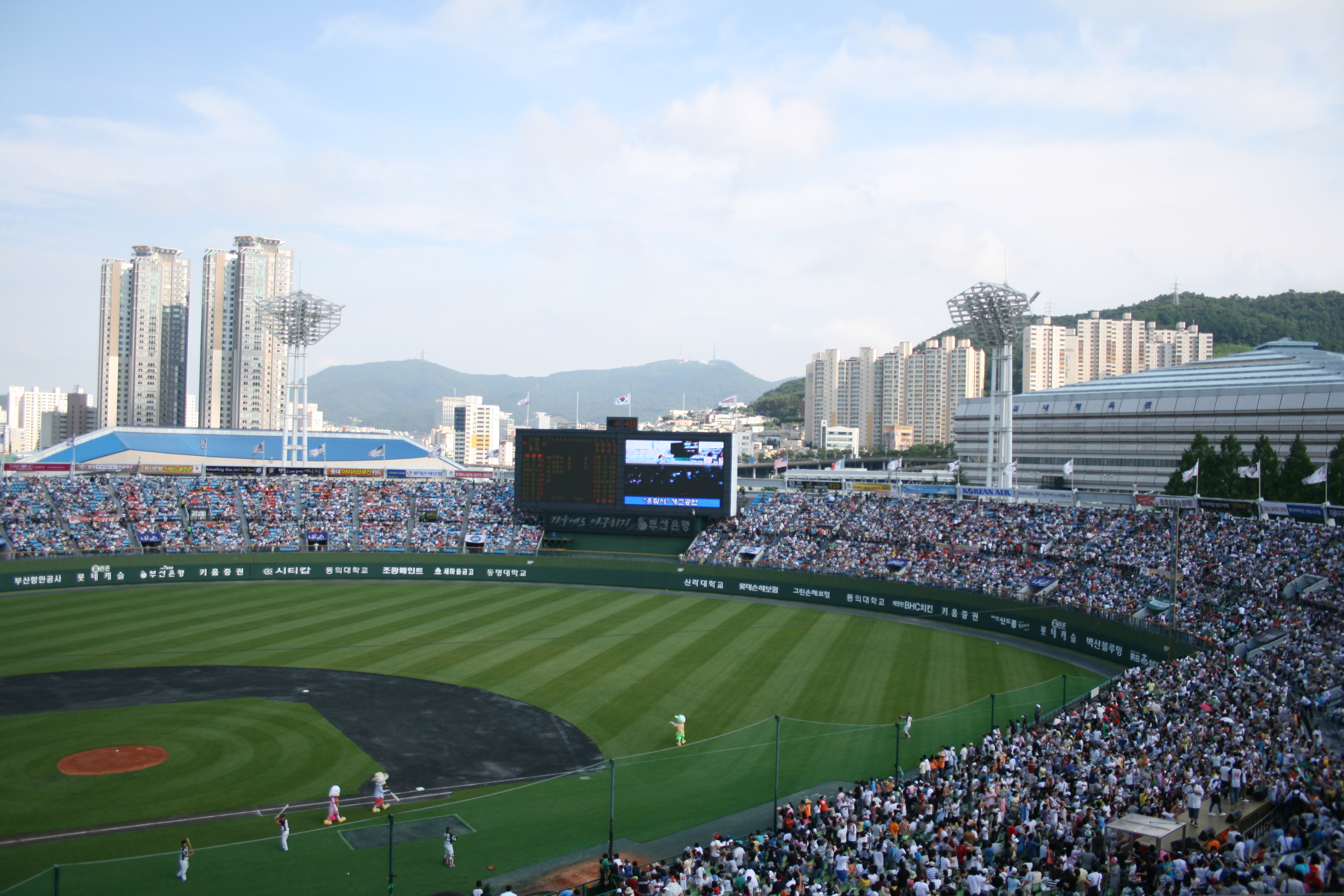
- Sajik Baseball Stadium
- Interactive map of Sajik Baseball Stadium
- Location: Sajik-dong, Dongnae-gu, Busan, South Korea
- Coordinates: 35°11′38.5″N 129°03′41.8″E
- Owner: City of Busan
- Capacity: 24,500
- Surface: Grass
- Field size: Left Field – 95.8 metres (314 ft); Left-Center – 113 metres (371 ft); Center Field – 121 metres (397 ft); Right-Center – 113 metres (371 ft); Right Field – 95.8 metres (314 ft); Outfield Wall Height – 6 metres (20 ft)

Construction
- Groundbreaking: July 1980
- Opened: October 1985

Tenant
- Lotte Giants (KBO League) (1986–present)

- Sajik Baseball Stadium
- Hangul: 사직야구장
- Hanja: 社稷野球場
- RR: Sajik yagujang
- MR: Sajik yagujang

The Sajik Baseball Stadium (Korean: 사직야구장) is a baseball stadium in Sajik-dong, Dongnae-gu, Busan, South Korea. It was built in 1985 and is the home stadium of KBO club Lotte Giants. It has a seating capacity of 24,500. It is known as a mecca for Korean baseball.

The stadium can be accessed via Sajik station which is on Busan Metro Line 3.
