= Changwon NC Park =

Baseball stadium in Changwon, South Korea

- 창원 NC 파크
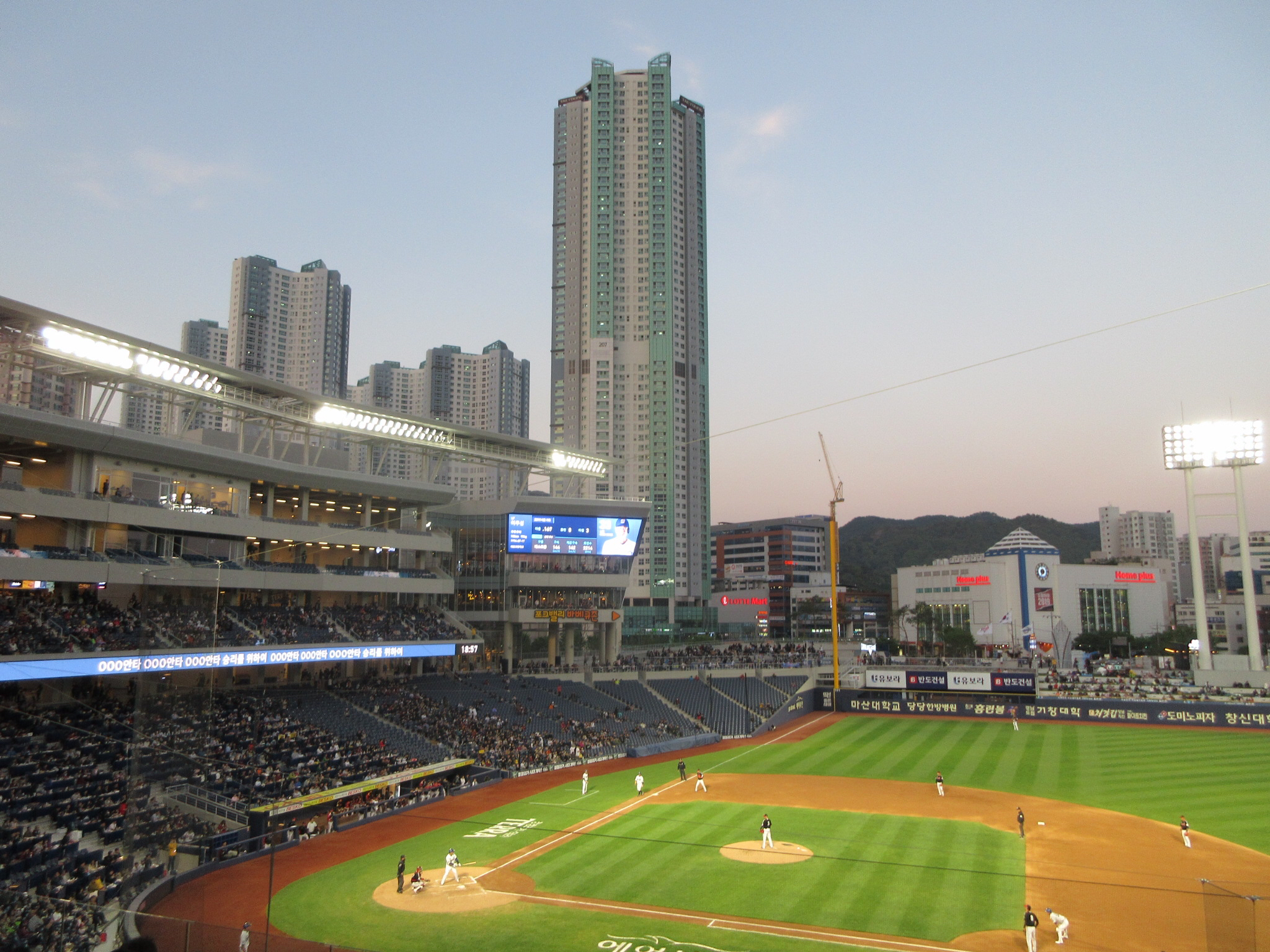
- Changwon NC Park in March 2019
- Interactive map of Changwon NC Park
- Location: Yangdeok-dong Masanhoewon-gu, Changwon, South Korea
- Coordinates: 35°13′20.8″N 128°34′54.6″E
- Owner: City of Changwon
- Capacity: 22,112
- Surface: Natural grass
- Field size: Left Field – 101 metres (331 ft); Left-Center – 123 metres (404 ft); Center Field – 122 metres (400 ft); Right-Center – 123 metres (404 ft); Right Field – 101 metres (331 ft); Outfield Wall Height – 3.3 metres (11 ft)

Construction
- Groundbreaking: June 2016
- Built: 2016–2019
- Opened: March 18, 2019

Tenant
- NC Dinos (KBO)

Changwon NC Park (Korean: 창원NC파크 is a baseball stadium in Changwon, South Korea. The stadium replaced the nearby Masan Baseball Stadium as the home of KBO club NC Dinos. The stadium was designed by architecture firm Populous and hosted its first game on March 23, 2019.
