= Suwon KT Wiz Park =

Stadium in Suwon, South Korea

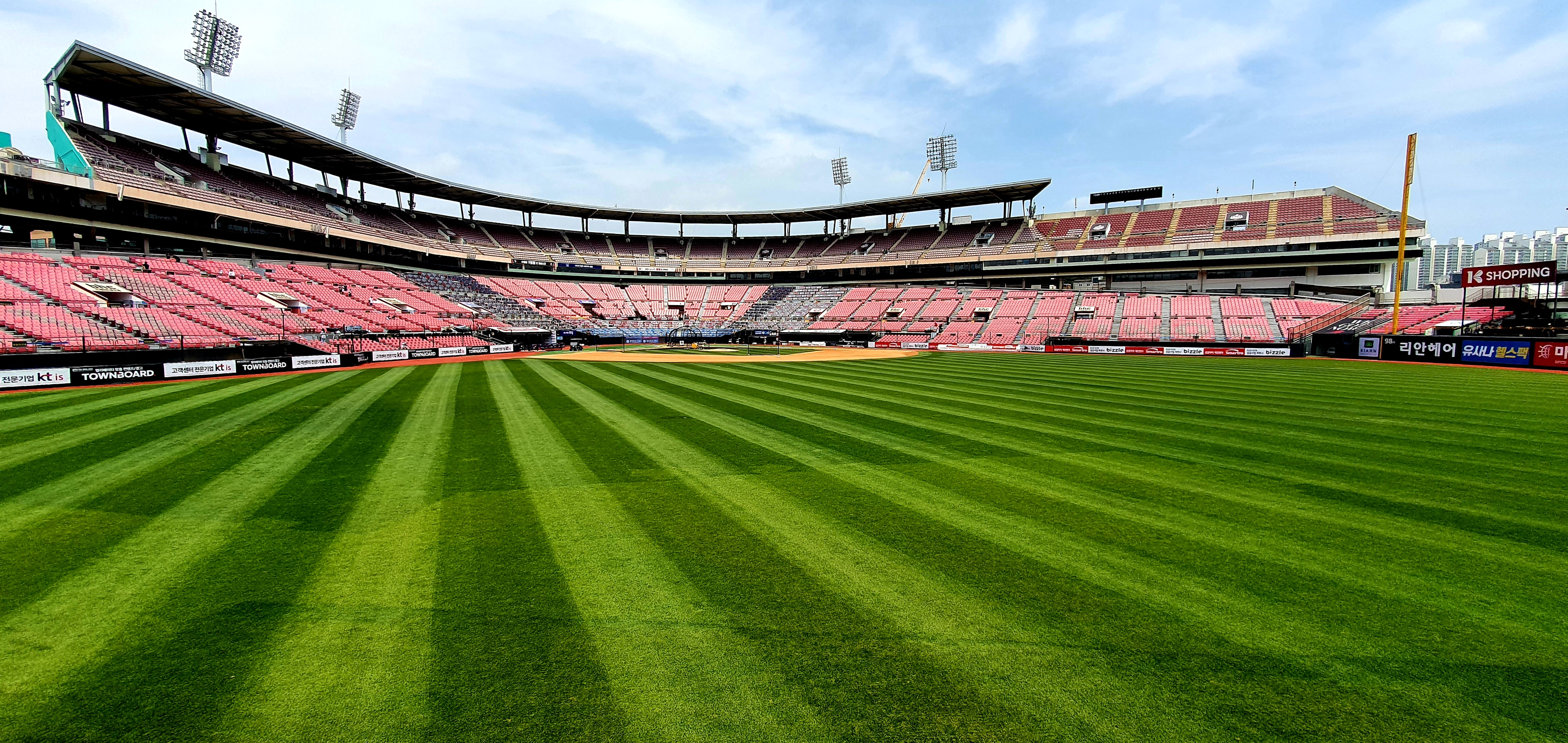
- Suwon kt wiz Park in 2022
- Interactive map of Suwon KT Wiz Park
- Full name: Suwon Sports Complex Baseball Field
- Location: Jowon-dong, Jangan-gu, Suwon, Gyeonggi-do, South Korea
- Coordinates: 37°17′59.2″N 127°00′34.8″E
- Operator: Suwon City Facilities Management Corporation
- Capacity: 20,000
- Surface: Grass
- Field size: Left Field – 98 metres (322 ft); Left-Center – 115 metres (377 ft); Center Field – 120 metres (394 ft); Right-Center – 115 metres (377 ft); Right Field – 98 metres (322 ft); Outfield Wall Height – 4 metres (13 ft)

Construction
- Built: October 1988
- Opened: April 2, 1989
- Renovated: 2013
- Expanded: 2013

Tenants
- Hyundai Unicorns (1989–2007); KT Wiz (2015–present)

The Suwon KT Wiz Park (Korean: 수원 케이티 위즈 파크), also known as the Suwon Baseball Stadium (Korean: 수원야구장), is a baseball stadium in Suwon, South Korea. Since 2015, it has been the home of KBO club KT Wiz. The stadium has a capacity of 20,000, and is part of the Suwon Sports Complex.

The stadium was the home of the Hyundai Unicorns from 1989 to 2007. In 2013, the stadium was renovated and expanded.
