= Ssangbangwool Raiders =

- 쌍방울 레이더스

Information
- League: KBO League (1990–1999)
- Location: Jeonju
- Ballpark: Jeonju Baseball Stadium (1990–1999)
- Established: 1990; 35 years ago
- Folded: 2000; 25 years ago
- Colors: Yellow and black
- Ownership: Ssangbangwool Group

The Ssangbangwool Raiders (Korean: 쌍방울 레이더스) were a South Korean professional baseball team founded in 1990 and dissolved upon bankruptcy of the team's owner after the 1999 season. They were based in the North Jeolla Province and were members of the Korea Baseball Organization. They made the playoffs twice in their nine-year KBO history, losing both times, never making it to the Korean Series.

The two most notable players who spent considerable time with the Raiders were designated hitter Kim Ki-tai, who won a home run title in 1994 and a batting title in 1997 (as well as being a three-time KBO League Golden Glove Award winner with the Raiders), and Park Kyung-oan, considered by many to be one of the best catchers in Korean baseball history.

== History ==
The Raiders played the 1990 season in the KBO Futures League, South Korea's second level of baseball. The team joined the KBO League in 1991.

On April 30, 1993, Raiders pitcher Kim Won-hyeong threw a no-hitter, defeating the OB Bears 3–0 at Jeonju Baseball Stadium. At the age of 20, Kim was the youngest KBO pitcher to ever throw a no-hitter.

Ssangbangwool suffered through a 17-game losing streak in 1999 on their way to a record of 28–97–7 and a winning percentage of .224, one of the worst seasons in KBO history. The Raiders were dissolved after the season because of the bankruptcy of the Ssangbangwool Group, the team's owner. The franchise was subsumed by the KBO, which then awarded a new franchise to the SK conglomerate. The new franchise was named the SK Wyverns and was formed in 2000.

== Season-by-season records ==
Season	Finish	Wins	Losses	Ties	Win%	Postseason	Awards	Manager
1991	6th place	52	71	3	.425	Did not qualify	Cho Kyu-je (P) (Rookie of the Year)	Kim In-sik
1992	8th place	41	84	1	.329	Did not qualify	Kim Ki-tai (DH) (Golden Glove Award)	Kim In-sik
1993	7th place	43	78	5	.361	Did not qualify	Kim Gwang-rim (OF), Kim Ki-tai (DH) (Golden Glove Award)	Shin Yong-kyun
1994	8th place	47	74	5	.393	Did not qualify	Pak No-jun (OF), Kim Ki-tai (DH) (Golden Glove Award)	Han Dong-hwa
1995	8th place	45	78	3	.369	Did not qualify	Kim Gwang-rim (OF) (Golden Glove Award)	Han Dong-hwa (24 games); Kim Woo-yeol (102 games)
1996	3rd place	70	54	2	.563	Lost playoff vs. Hyundai Unicorns (2–3)	Park Kyung-oan (C) (Golden Glove Award)	Kim Sung-keun
1997	3rd place	71	53	2	.571	Lost semi-playoff vs. Samsung Lions (1–2)	Choe Tae-won (2B) (Golden Glove Award)	Kim Sung-keun
1998	6th place	58	66	2	.468	Did not qualify		Kim Sung-keun
1999	4th place (Magic League)	28	97	7	.224	Did not qualify		Kim Sung-keun; Kim Joon-hwan
