= Jeonju Baseball Stadium =

Baseball stadium in Jeonju, South Korea

- Interactive map of Jeonju Baseball Stadium
- Location: Jeonju, South Korea
- Coordinates: 35.837807°N 127.124679°E
- Owner: City of Jeonju
- Capacity: 10,000
- Surface: Grass

Tenants
- Haitai Tigers (KBO) 1982–1989; Ssangbangwool Raiders 1990–1999

- Jeonju Baseball Stadium
- Hangul: 전주 종합 경기장 야구장
- Hanja: 全州 綜合 競技場 野球場
- Revised Romanization: Jeonju jonghab gyeonggijang yagujang
- McCune–Reischauer: Chŏnju chonghap kyŏnggijang yagujang

Jeonju Baseball Stadium was a baseball stadium in the city of Jeonju, South Korea. It was the former home of the Haitai Tigers and Ssangbangwool Raiders and held 10,000 people. The stadium was demolished in 2023.
