= Hyundai Unicorns =

Defunct South Korean professional baseball team

- 현대 유니콘스
- Logo

Information
- League: KBO League (1982–2007)
- Location: Incheon (1982–1999); Suwon (2000–2007)
- Ballpark: Suwon Baseball Stadium (1989–2007)
- Established: 1982; 44 years ago
- Folded: January 2008; 18 years ago
- Korean Series championships: 1998, 2000, 2003, 2004
- League championships: 1998, 2003, 2004
- Former name: Sammi Superstars (1982–1985); Chungbo Pintos (1985–1987); Pacific Dolphins (1988–1995)
- Former ballpark: Sungui Baseball Stadium (1982–1999)
- Ownership: Hyundai

The Hyundai Unicorns (Korean: 현대 유니콘스; RR: Hyeondae Yunikonseu) were a South Korean professional baseball team based in Suwon. They were a member of the KBO League. The Unicorns won the KBO championship four times (1998, 2000, 2003 and 2004).

The Unicorns were dissolved after the 2007 season. Hyundai Unicorns' players and staff were signed in a takeover deal and became the Heroes Baseball Club. The Unicorns and the Heroes have no historical links, although the new team consisted mostly of former Unicorns players.

== History ==
=== Sammi Superstars ===
The franchise was founded in 1982 as one of the original six teams in the Korea Baseball Organization. Owned by Sammi Steel Co., Ltd., the team was called the Sammi Superstars, and was based in Incheon.

The 1983 team featured one of the most remarkable pitching seasons in modern history. Japanese import Hiroaki Fukushi, dubbed "Jang Myeong-bu" in the KBO League, pitched in 60 of the team's 100 games, completing a record 36 of them, with five shutouts. He threw 427-1/3 innings, facing 1,712 batters, allowing 388 hits, walking 106, and striking out 220 (at that point a KBO League record), with a 2.34 ERA. He won a still-league record 30 games, lost 16, and saved an additional six games. He threw 192-2/3 more innings and allowed 155 more hits than the runner-up in those categories. Jang's 30 wins and 6 saves made up more than 69% of the team's 52 wins that year; for his efforts, he was given the 1983 KBO League Golden Glove Award in pitching.

=== Chungbo Pintos ===
The 1985 Superstars team lost a league-record 18 games in a row between 31 March and 29 April. The team was sold to Chungbo on 29 June of that year, and between the two 1985 half-seasons, was renamed the Chungbo Pintos.

=== Pacific Dolphins ===
In 1988, the team was sold again to Pacific Chemicals (now Amore Pacific Group), and renamed as Pacific Dolphins. In 1989 the franchise made the playoffs for the first time, eventually losing to the Haitai Tigers.

The 1993 squad at one point lost 15 games in a row, finishing the season 34–82–10, with a winning percentage of .310. In 1994, the team finished second in the KBO, making it all the way to the franchise's first Korean Series, where they were defeated by the LG Twins four games to none.

=== Hyundai Unicorns ===
After the 1995 KBO season, due to financial difficulties, the team was sold again, this time to the Hynix Semiconductor branch of the Hyundai Group, and renamed the Hyundai Unicorns. Hyundai had previously sponsored the Hyundai Phoenix of the Korea Baseball Association amateur league, and due to the business relationship between the Phoenix and the newly named Unicorns, five players on the Phoenix roster moved to the Unicorns.

In 1996, the team hired Kim Jae-bak as manager, who would eventually guide them to four championships. The Unicorns made it to the Korean Series in their first year under Kim, but lost again, this time to the Tigers. 1998 was a banner year for the Unicorns, as they finished first in the KBO and finally won the Korean Series, against the LG Twins, four games to two.

The Unicorns' Chung Min-tae was one of the top pitchers in the KBO in the period from 1998 to 2003, as he won the KBO League Golden Glove Award three times during that span. Chung led the league in victories in three separate years — 1999, 2000, and 2003 — topping 20 victories in 1999.

In 2000, the team relocated from Incheon to Suwon. That year, the Unicorns finished first in the Dream League division, and again won the Korean Series, defeating Doosan Bears four games to three. In 2000, catcher Park Kyung-oan had arguably the best season of his career, hitting .282 with 40 home runs, and winning the KBO League Most Valuable Player Award.

The Unicorns finished in first place in 2003 and 2004, and won the Korean Series both times, defeating the SK Wyverns and Samsung Lions, respectively. Those teams were led offensively by Shim Jeong-soo and American import Cliff Brumbaugh. In 2003 Shim had a great season, hitting .335 with 53 home runs (second all-time) and 142 RBI, with a then-record OPS of 1.197 (still second all-time). In 2004 Brumbaugh came close to winning the KBO League Triple Crown with a .343 batting average (tops in the league), 33 home runs (second), and 105 RBI (third).

Despite the team's strong record during these years, from 2001 to 2007 the Unicorns faced financial challenges due to the majority owner, Hynix Semiconductor, being in court protection, as well as the team's low attendances. Through these years the Unicorns had to rely on financial assistance from other Hyundai affiliates. At the end of the 2006 season, the team was almost sold to Korea's National Agricultural Cooperative Federation, but the sale fell through.

The team was dissolved in January 2008. After that, Seattle-based Centennial Investments signed Hyundai Unicorns' players and staff in a takeover deal, and founded the Heroes Baseball Club, moving the team to Seoul.

== Season-by-season records ==
Season	Team name	Finish	Wins	Losses	Ties	Win%	Postseason	Awards	Manager
1982	Sammi Superstars	6th (1st half); 6th (2nd half)	15	65	0	0.188	Did not qualify		Park Hyun-sik
1983	Sammi Superstars	2nd (1st half); 2nd (2nd half)	52	47	1	0.525	Did not qualify		Kim Jin-young
1984	Sammi Superstars	6th (1st half); 6th (2nd half)	38	59	3	0.392	Did not qualify		Kim Jin-young
1985	Sammi Superstars	6th (1st half)	39	70	1	0.358	Did not qualify		Kim Jin-young
1985	Chungbo Pintos	6th (2nd half)	39	70	1	0.358	Did not qualify		Kim Jin-young
1986	Chungbo Pintos	6th (1st half); 7th (2nd half)	32	74	2	0.302	Did not qualify		Heo Koo-yeon
1987	Chungbo Pintos	7th (1st half); 6th (2nd half)	41	65	2	0.389	Did not qualify		Kang Tae-jung
1988	Pacific Dolphins	6th (1st half); 7th (2nd half)	34	73	1	0.319	Did not qualify		Kang Tae-jung
1989	Pacific Dolphins	3rd	62	54	4	0.533	Won semi-playoff vs. Samsung Lions (2–1); Lost playoff vs. Haitai Tigers (0–3)	Park Jeong-hyeon (Rookie of the Year)	Kim Sung-keun
1990	Pacific Dolphins	5th	58	59	3	0.496	Did not qualify		Kim Sung-keun
1991	Pacific Dolphins	5th	55	69	2	0.444	Did not qualify		Park Young-gil
1992	Pacific Dolphins	6th	56	67	3	0.456	Did not qualify		Jeong Dong-jin
1993	Pacific Dolphins	8th	34	82	10	0.310	Did not qualify		Jeong Dong-jin
1994	Pacific Dolphins	2nd	68	55	3	0.552	Won playoff vs. Hanwha Eagles (3–0); Lost Korean Series vs. LG Twins (0–4)		Jeong Dong-jin
1995	Pacific Dolphins	7th	48	73	5	0.401	Did not qualify		Jeong Dong-jin
1996	Hyundai Unicorns	2nd	67	54	5	0.552	Won semi-playoff vs. Hanwha Eagles (2–0); Won playoff vs. Ssangbangwool Raiders (3–2); Lost Korean Series vs. Haitai Tigers (2–4)	Park Jae-hong (Rookie of the Year)	Kim Jae-bak
1997	Hyundai Unicorns	6th	51	71	4	0.421	Did not qualify		Kim Jae-bak
1998	Hyundai Unicorns	1st	81	45	0	0.643	Won Korean Series vs. LG Twins (4–2)	Kim Soo-kyung (Rookie of the Year)	Kim Jae-bak
1999	Hyundai Unicorns	3rd (Dream League)	68	59	5	0.535	Did not qualify		Kim Jae-bak
2000	Hyundai Unicorns	1st (Dream League)	91	40	2	0.695	Won playoff vs. Samsung Lions (4–0); Won Korean Series vs. Doosan Bears (4–3)	Park Kyung-oan (MVP)	Kim Jae-bak
2001	Hyundai Unicorns	3rd	72	57	4	0.558	Lost playoff vs. Doosan Bears (1–3)		Kim Jae-bak
2002	Hyundai Unicorns	4th	70	58	5	0.547	Lost semi-playoff vs. LG Twins (0–2)	Cho Yong-jun (Rookie of the Year)	Kim Jae-bak
2003	Hyundai Unicorns	1st	80	51	2	0.611	Won Korean Series vs. SK Wyverns (4–3)	Lee Dong-hak (Rookie of the Year)	Kim Jae-bak
2004	Hyundai Unicorns	1st	75	53	5	0.586	Won Korean Series vs. Samsung Lions (4–2)	Oh Ju-won (Rookie of the Year)	Kim Jae-bak
2005	Hyundai Unicorns	7th	53	70	3	0.431	Did not qualify		Kim Jae-bak
2006	Hyundai Unicorns	3rd	70	55	1	0.560	Lost playoff vs. Hanwha Eagles (1–3)		Kim Jae-bak
2007	Hyundai Unicorns	6th	56	69	1	0.448	Did not qualify		Kim Si-jin
