= KBO League =

Professional baseball league in South Korea

- Current season, competition or edition: 2026 KBO League season
- Formerly: Korea Professional Baseball (1982–2014)
- Sport: Baseball
- Founded: 1982; 44 years ago
- First season: 1982
- Organising body: Korea Baseball Organization
- No. of teams: 10
- Country: South Korea
- Most recent champion: Samsung Lions (9th title) (2026)
- Most titles: Kia Tigers (12 titles)
- Qualification: Asia Series (2005–2013)
- Broadcasters: KBS; MBC; SBS; SPOTV
- Streaming partners: South Korea; TVING; Outside South Korea; SOOP
- Related competitions: KBO Futures League (minor league); KBO Fall League (showcase league)
- Website: koreabaseball.com

The KBO League (Korean: KBO 리그) is the highest level professional baseball league in South Korea, consisting of ten teams. The KBO League was founded with six franchises in 1982 and is the most popular sports league in South Korea. The Kia Tigers are the most successful team, having won 12 of the 45 championships.

In comparison with American Major League Baseball, ESPN reports that the KBO level of play "appears to be somewhere between Double-A and Triple-A, on average, though the best players are more likely to be MLB-quality than your typical Double-A league." Historically, the KBO is known for its vocal and exuberant fan base, as well as the widespread practice of bat flips (ppa-dun (Korean: 빠던), a portmanteau of the "first syllables of the words for 'bat' and 'throw'") by hitters after striking what they think will be a home run. In the KBO, the bat flipping tradition dates to the 1990s.

== League structure ==
=== Regular season ===
Since the 2015 season, each team plays 144 games in the regular season, an increase from 128 games, along with the introduction of the KT Wiz to the league. Each team plays every other team 16 times. In general, Korean teams play six games a week, with every Monday off.

=== KBO All-Star Game ===
In mid-July of every season, the best players participate in the KBO All-Star Game. The franchises participating are divided into two sets of teams: "Dream All-Stars" (Doosan, KT, Lotte, Samsung, and SSG) and "Nanum All-Stars" (Kia, Hanwha, LG, NC and Kiwoom).

=== Post-season ===
The KBO League's season culminates in its championship series, known as the KBO Korean Series. Currently, the top five teams qualify for the post-season based on win–loss records. The lowest-qualifying teams face off in a step-ladder playoff system, where each winner then faces the next-highest team, culminating in the Korean Series against the top-ranked team.

- KBO Wild Card Game: fifth-place team vs. fourth-place team

Fourth-place team starts the series with a 1–0 lead and advances with one win or a tie, while the fifth-place team must win twice to advance.

- KBO Semi-playoffs: KBO Wild Card Game winner vs. third-place team

Best of five series.

- KBO Playoffs: KBO Semi-playoffs winner vs. second-place team

Best of five series.

- KBO Korean Series: KBO Playoffs winner vs. first-place team

Best of seven series.

Any playoff games ending in an official tie are replayed, thereby raising the possibility of a close series containing more than the scheduled five or seven games.

== Rules ==
The KBO League rules are essentially those of the Major League Baseball (MLB). The designated hitter rule is universal in KBO.

Traditionally, South Korean professional baseball games have a maximum number of extra innings before a game is declared an official tie, except in 2008 when unlimited innings were trialed for the season. Until 2025, the extra inning limit was three innings during the regular season (twelve innings overall), and six extra innings (fifteen innings overall) in postseason games. Starting with the 2025 season, the limit was changed to two extra innings in the regular season, for a limit of eleven innings overall.

== History ==
=== Origins ===
The first game was played on March 27, 1982, between the Samsung Lions and the MBC Chungyong at Dongdaemun Baseball Stadium, Seoul. Then-president Chun Doo-hwan threw out the ceremonial first pitch.

The 1982 charter teams of its first season were:

- Haitai Tigers, based in Gwangju
- Lotte Giants, based in Busan
- MBC Chungyong, based in Seoul
- OB Bears, based in Daejeon
- Sammi Superstars, based in Incheon
- Samsung Lions, based in Daegu

The first Korean Series featured the OB Bears versus the Samsung Lions, with the Bears winning the championship 4 games to 1, with a tie.

=== The 1980s ===
The Haitai Tigers dominated the 1980s, winning the Korean Series five times — in 1983, 1986, and 1987 through 1989. They were led by pitcher Sun Dong-yol and infielders Kim Seong-han and Han Dae-hwa. Other KBO stars whose careers took off in the 1980s were sluggers Chang Jong-hoon and Lee Man-soo.

From 1982 to 1988, the regular season was divided into two (a spring season and a fall season), with a first-half pennant winner and a latter-half pennant winner. The two pennant winners then played each other for the Korean Series championship. The 1982 campaign featured an 80-game (in total) season, which expanded to 100 games from 1983 to 1984. Rosters for each team were small (sometimes as few as 14 players), and many players in the league both pitched and batted. Bang Soo-won of the Haitai Tigers pitched the first no-hitter in South Korean professional baseball history, in 1984 against the Sammi Superstars.

Mid-season 1985, the Sammi Superstars were sold and became known as the Chungbo Pintos, and the full season expanded to 110 games. Because the Samsung Lions won both half-season pennants (with a still single-season record .706 winning percentage), the Lions won the title outright so no Korean Series was played that year.

Because of the lack of a postseason in 1985, the next year saw some major changes, with the adoption of a playoff system, in which the top two teams from each half-season played for the right to get to the Korean Series. 1986 also saw the OB Bears moving from Daejeon to share Jamsil Baseball Stadium with MBC Chungyong in Seoul. A new franchise, the Binggrae Eagles, joined the league, replacing the vacancy in Daejeon made by OB's move, and expanding the league to seven teams. From 1986 to 1988, the regular season shrank to a total of 108 games.

1988 saw the Cheongbo Pintos change ownership again, becoming the Pacific Dolphins. In 1989 the KBO eliminated the two half-season pennants, moving to a single season of 120 games.

=== The 1990s ===
In the 1990s the Tigers were again dominant, winning the championship four times in the decade — 1991, 1993, 1996, and 1997. The Tigers were led by hitting-machine Lee Jong-beom and slugger Lee Ho-joon. Other KBO players who starred in the 1990s were Eagles' pitcher Song Jin-woo, who eventually became the all-time KBO leader in wins, strikeouts, and innings pitched; slugging catcher Park Kyung-oan, the first catcher in KBO history to hit 300 home runs; and stolen base king Jeon Jun-ho. But probably the most notable hitters to emerge from the 1990s were the Lions' Lee Seung-yuop and Yang Joon-hyuk, who between them now hold most of the KBO's career offensive records.

In 1990, MBC Chungyong became the LG Twins and an eighth franchise was added, the Ssangbangwool Raiders, who represented the North Jeolla Province region.

From 1991 to 1998, the season increased to 126 games. The Lotte Giants won the Korean Series championship in 1992; the team has not won it since. There was little other change during this period except for a few major sponsors: in 1993 the Binggrae Eagles became the Hanwha Eagles, in 1996 the Pacific Dolphins became the Hyundai Unicorns, and in 1999 the OB Bears became the Doosan Bears.

The 1998 Korean Series was won by the Hyundai Unicorns for the franchise's first championship in 16 years of existence. (The team would go on to win the championship in 2000, 2003, and 2004.)

In 1999 the season was expanded to 132 games, and the KBO separated into two divisions — the Dream League and the Magic League. The 1999 Dream League consisted of the Doosan Bears, the Lotte Giants, the Haitai Tigers, and the Hyundai Unicorns; the 1999 Magic League consisted of the Hanwha Eagles, the LG Twins, the Samsung Lions, and the Ssangbangwool Raiders. That year the Eagles — in their 14th season — won their franchise's first (and only) Korean Series championship, after 14 years in the KBO.

=== The 2000s ===
Bigger changes were made in 2000 when the Hyundai Unicorns moved from Incheon to Suwon, and a new franchise, the SK Wyverns, took their place in Incheon. The Ssangbangwool Raiders became defunct. The league's two-division structure slightly shifted as well, with SK taking Ssangbangwool's place in the Magic Division, and Lotte and Samsung switching divisions. Thus, the 2000 Dream League was composed of Doosan, Haitai, Hyundai, and Samsung; while the 2000 Magic League was composed of Hanwha, LG, Lotte, and SK.

Parity ruled the 2000s, with the Unicorns and Lions each winning three titles, and the upstart Wyverns winning two. The hard-luck Doosan Bears appeared in the Korean Series five times in the decade but only won it once, in 2001. Stars who emerged in the 2000s include all-time KBO hit king Park Yong-taik, the Giants' first-baseman Dae-ho Lee, and the Eagles' first-baseman Kim Tae-kyun. Other notable players from the era include slugging third-basemen Lee Bum-ho and Choi Jeong, the Bears' designated hitter Hong Sung-heon, and the Twins' long-time outfielder Lee Byung-kyu.

In 2001, the KBO returned to a single-division format. The Haitai Tigers became the Kia Tigers. From 2000 to 2012, the length of the regular season fluctuated between 126 and 133 games.

Despite its string of championships in the early 2000s, the Hyundai Unicorns franchise was disbanded in 2008. It was re-founded as the Woori Heroes and moved to Mok-dong in Seoul. In 2010, the team's naming rights were sold to Nexen Tire and the team was renamed the Nexen Heroes until the end of the 2018 season, when its naming rights were sold to Kiwoom Securities.

=== The 2010s ===
The Samsung Lions were a powerful team in the 2010s, winning the championship four times during six straight appearances in the Korean Series (from 2010 to 2015). The Doosan Bears were also a powerhouse, appearing in the Korean Series six times in the decade (including five straight appearances from 2015 to 2019), winning it three times.

Expansion resumed in the 2010s, with the addition of the NC Dinos, located in Changwon, which joined the league in 2013. It is the first team located in Changwon, the city having previously been the second home of the nearby Lotte Giants. The KBO played 128-game seasons in 2013–2014.

In 2015, the KT Wiz became the league's tenth franchise. They play their home games in Suwon, which had not had a team since the Hyundai Unicorns' disbandment. Since 2015 the KBO has played a 144-game season each year, and has added a fifth team to the playoffs, with the introduction of the Wild Card game. In 2015 the league also increased the active roster size of each team, from 26 to 27 (of those, 25 may play in any one game).

After a number of seasons of inflated offensive production, the KBO introduced a new "dejuiced" baseball before the 2019 season. The results showed in a significant decrease in runs per game and home runs per game.

=== The 2020s ===
The 2020 season was delayed by the COVID-19 pandemic, but finally started play in May 2020, with no fans in attendance. In response to the lack of live sports programming due to the pandemic, and the delay of the U.S. MLB season, American broadcaster ESPN notably acquired rights to a package of KBO games during the 2020 season; the games were broadcast remotely, and featured English-language commentary by ESPN Major League Baseball personalities such as Karl Ravech, Jason Benetti, Boog Sciambi, Eduardo Perez, and Jessica Mendoza. The deal was for the 2020 season only and was not renewed for 2021.

== Expatriate baseball players in the KBO ==
As with Nippon Professional Baseball (NPB), the KBO league places a cap on the number of foreign players allowed on club rosters. The foreign player limit is set at three (no more than two of them being pitchers), increased from two players from 2014. Foreign players can only sign single-season contracts, and they are restricted by a salary cap. Since 2019, the total compensation for a foreign player has been capped at $1 million. The foreign hitters on each team are expected to provide power in the middle of the order, while the foreign pitchers are expected to anchor the starting rotation. As with foreign players in the NPB, many of the most celebrated foreign players came to Korea after not finding success in the Major Leagues.

The KBO first began allowing foreign players in 1998, when each team was allowed to sign up to two imports. Traditionally, teams chose one hitter and one pitcher, although there were exceptions. (In 2001 and 2002, KBO teams were allowed three foreign-born players, but only two of them could be on the field at the same time.) By 2012, teams were using all their foreign-player allotments on pitchers, and there were no more foreign hitters in the KBO. After this happened again in 2013, the following season the KBO League raised the foreign-player limit to three for each team, but mandated that at least one foreign player had to be a hitter (again, with only two such players on the field at a time).

American Tyrone Woods was the first notable import. Debuting with the Doosan Bears in 1998, Woods was the first foreign player to hit a home run (as well as the first to be ejected from a game by an umpire). In his first year Woods set a then-KBO record with 42 homers and won the MVP award (becoming the first foreign player to win the award). In five years in Korea, Woods hit 174 homers, drove in 510 runs, and batted .294. (He later found additional success in Nippon Professional Baseball.) Woods left Korea with the longest career of any foreign player in KBO history, a record later eclipsed by hitter Jay Davis and pitcher Dustin Nippert. Davis played seven seasons for Hanwha (1999–2002, 2004–2006), compiling a .313 batting average, 167 home runs, and 591 RBI during that span.

Foreign pitchers with extended careers in the KBO include Dustin Nippert, who compiled a win–loss record of 102–51 and 1,082 strikeouts in eight seasons (a foreign player record); and Danny Rios, who in six seasons was 90–59 with 807 strikeouts and an ERA of 3.01, which is the lowest career ERA of any foreign pitcher in the KBO. Josh Lindblom pitched in the KBO for five seasons, compiling a 63–34 record and 750 strikeouts. Rios was given the 2008 KBO League Most Valuable Player Award, Nippert was KBO MVP in 2016, and Lindblom won the award in 2019.

American Jerry Royster was the first-ever non-Korean to take the helm of one of South Korea's professional baseball clubs when he was signed as manager of the Lotte Giants in 2007. (Royster served as the Giants' manager through the 2010 season.)

Over the league's history, more than 200 Americans have played in the KBO; other countries which have produced many current and former KBO players include the Dominican Republic (with more than 80 players), and Venezuela (with more than 20 players).

== KBO players in Japan and the U.S. ==
Several KBO players have had successful careers in Japan's Nippon Professional Baseball (NPB). Baek In-chun played professionally in Japan from 1963 to 1981, compiling 209 home runs, 776 RBI, and 1,831 hits in the NPB. (He returned to Korea for his final three seasons as a player.) Lee Seung-yuop, who holds the KBO records for career home runs, runs scored, RBIs, total bases, slugging percentage and OPS, also played eight seasons in the NPB, accumulating an additional 159 home runs and 439 RBI. Other KBO hitters who had some success in the NPB include Kim Tae-kyun and Dae-ho Lee. Korean pitchers who have had an impact in the NPB include Sun Dong-yol, Lim Chang-yong, and Seung-hwan Oh (who led the NPB in saves in both 2014 and 2015).

Several Korean players have also successfully transitioned from the KBO to American Major League Baseball, starting in 1994 with pitcher Chan Ho Park. Prior to Park, the South Korea-born Mexican pitcher Ernesto Carlos was signed to an American minor league contract with the San Francisco Giants' organization in 1968 after having found success in the NPB. Similarly, pitcher Park Chul-soon signed a minor league deal with the Milwaukee Brewers organization in 1980. Neither Ernesto Carlos nor Park Chul-soon, however, made it to the Major Leagues. Other Korean players who have had lengthy MLB careers include outfielder Shin-Soo Choo and pitcher Byung-hyun Kim. In 2013, Hanwha Eagles ace Hyun-jin Ryu became the first player from the KBO to join an MLB team through the posting system. Altogether, 28 South Korean players have made it to the MLB as of 2025.

== Teams ==

Team	City	Stadium	Capacity	Founded	Joined
Doosan Bears	Seoul	Jamsil Olympic Stadium	18,000	1982	
Hanwha Eagles	Daejeon	Daejeon Hanwha Life Ballpark	20,000	1985	1986
Kia Tigers	Gwangju	Gwangju-Kia Champions Field	20,500	1982	
Kiwoom Heroes	Seoul	Gocheok Sky Dome	16,744	2008	
KT Wiz	Suwon	Suwon KT Wiz Park	20,000	2013	2015
LG Twins	Seoul	Jamsil Olympic Stadium	18,000	1982	
Lotte Giants	Busan	Sajik Baseball Stadium	24,500	1975	1982
NC Dinos	Changwon	Changwon NC Park	22,112	2011	2013
Samsung Lions	Daegu	Daegu Samsung Lions Park	24,000	1982	
SSG Landers	Incheon	Incheon SSG Landers Field	23,000	2000	

Defunct clubs
Team	City	Stadium	Founded	Joined	Ceased
Hyundai Unicorns	Suwon	Suwon Baseball Stadium	1982		2008
Ssangbangwool Raiders	Jeonju	Jeonju Baseball Stadium	1990	1991	1999

== Broadcasters ==
In South Korea, most of the games are aired free-to-air on MBC, SBS and KBS2, and at pay television on KBS N Sports, MBC Sports+, SBS Sports and SPOTV1/2.

Between 2021 and 2023, SPOTV broadcast selected games in the ASEAN region.

In 2024, streaming platform TVING became the exclusive home of the KBO League, marking the end of the league's free online broadcast era in South Korea. In June that same year, free streaming service SOOP acquired the rights to broadcast all KBO games outside of South Korea through the 2026 season.

== Ballparks ==
Doosan Bears	LG Twins	Hanwha Eagles	Kia Tigers	Kiwoom Heroes
Jamsil Olympic Stadium		Daejeon Hanwha Life Ballpark	Gwangju-Kia Champions Field	Gocheok Sky Dome
Capacity: 18,000		Capacity: 20,000	Capacity: 20,500	Capacity: 16,744
KT Wiz	Lotte Giants	NC Dinos	Samsung Lions	SSG Landers
Suwon KT Wiz Park	Sajik Baseball Stadium	Changwon NC Park	Daegu Samsung Lions Park	Incheon SSG Landers Field
Capacity: 20,000	Capacity: 24,500	Capacity: 22,112	Capacity: 24,000	Capacity: 23,000

In addition to these ballparks, the Lotte Giants play some games at Ulsan Munsu Baseball Stadium, the Samsung Lions at Pohang Baseball Stadium and the Hanwha Eagles at Cheongju Baseball Stadium.

== Attendance figures ==
In the 2016 season, a new national record was set with more than 8 million spectators. There was a big increase of 1 million compared to the previous season.

The record was broken again in the 2017 season with over 8.4 million fans at the regular season games. The Bears, Twins, Giants and Tigers all attracted over 1 million fans, and the average game attendance was above 11,600 fans. This increase in popularity has been accompanied by the building of larger and more modern ballparks to further enhance the fan experience and their expenditures during games, such as the Gwangju-Kia Champions Field (2014), Gocheok Sky Dome (2016), Daegu Samsung Lions Park (2016), Changwon NC Park (2019), and Daejeon Hanwha Life Ballpark (2025).

The record was once again surpassed in the 2025 season, when more than 12 million fans watched the entire regular season.

The KBO League has shown significant growth among female audiences in recent years; data from the early 2024 season showed that approximately 54% of ticket holders were female, with the majority being in their 20s. Survey released after the 2024 season not only confirmed the early season data, but also showed that women in their 30s also had a strong interest in the league and were more interested in financially supporting their favorite teams than their male counterparts. The growth in the number of female fans continued in the 2025 season, with women representing approximately 58% of all tickets sold.

== Associations ==
KBO League players and coaches have formed a number of associations:

- Korea Professional Baseball Players Association (KPBPA)
- Korea Professional Baseball Alumni Association — retired players
- Ilgoo Club — former and active coaches and managers

== Post-season ==
=== Korean Series champions ===
Club	Champions	Runners-up	Seasons won	Seasons runners-up
Kia Tigers	12	0	1983, 1986, 1987, 1988, 1989, 1991, 1993, 1996, 1997, 2009, 2017, 2024	—
Samsung Lions	9	11	1985, 2002, 2005, 2006, 2011, 2012, 2013, 2014, 2026	1982, 1984, 1986, 1987, 1990, 1993, 2001, 2004, 2010, 2015, 2024
Doosan Bears	6	9	1982, 1995, 2001, 2015, 2016, 2019	2000, 2005, 2007, 2008, 2013, 2017, 2018, 2020, 2021
SSG Landers	5	4	2007, 2008, 2010, 2018, 2022	2003, 2009, 2011, 2012
LG Twins	4	4	1990, 1994, 2023, 2025	1983, 1997, 1998, 2002
Hyundai Unicorns (defunct)	4	2	1998, 2000, 2003, 2004	1994, 1996
Lotte Giants	2	3	1984, 1992	1985, 1995, 1999
Hanwha Eagles	1	6	1999	1988, 1989, 1991, 1992, 2006, 2025
KT Wiz	1	2	2021	2023, 2026
NC Dinos	1	1	2020	2016
Kiwoom Heroes	0	3	—	2014, 2019, 2022

== Awards ==
See footnote and Baseball awards#South Korea

- KBO League MVP Award
- KBO League Rookie of the Year Award
- KBO League Golden Glove Award
- Choi Dong-won Award
- KBO League Korean Series MVP Award
- KBO League All-Star Game MVP

== Records ==
- List of KBO career home run leaders
- List of KBO career hits leaders
- List of KBO career RBI leaders
- List of KBO career stolen bases leaders
- List of KBO career win leaders
- List of KBO career strikeout leaders
- List of KBO career saves leaders
- List of KBO League no-hitters

== See also ==
- Baseball in South Korea
- Korea Baseball Organization
- KBO Futures League
- List of current KBO League team rosters
- List of foreign KBO League players
- List of KBO League seasons
- Posting system (KBO)
