= LG Twins =

Korean baseball team in Seoul, South Korea

- LG 트윈스

Logo	Cap insignia

Information
- League: KBO League (1982–present)
- Location: Seoul
- Ballpark: Jamsil Olympic Stadium (2027–present)
- Established: 1982; 44 years ago
- Korean Series championships: 1990, 1994, 2023, 2025
- League championships: 1990, 1994, 2023, 2025
- Former name: MBC Chungyong (1982–1989)
- Former ballpark: Jamsil Baseball Stadium (1982–2026)
- Colors: Black, maroon and grey
- Retired numbers: 9, 33, 41
- Ownership: LG Corporation
- General manager: Cha Myung-suk
- Manager: Youm Kyoung-youb
- Website: www.lgtwins.com

Current uniforms
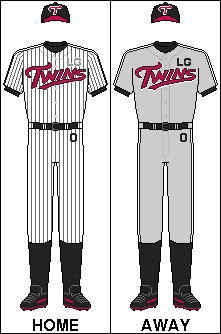

The LG Twins (Korean: LG 트윈스) are a South Korean professional baseball team based in Seoul, South Korea. They are a member of the KBO League. The Twins play their home games at Jamsil Olympic Stadium, which they share with their rivals, the Doosan Bears.

== History ==
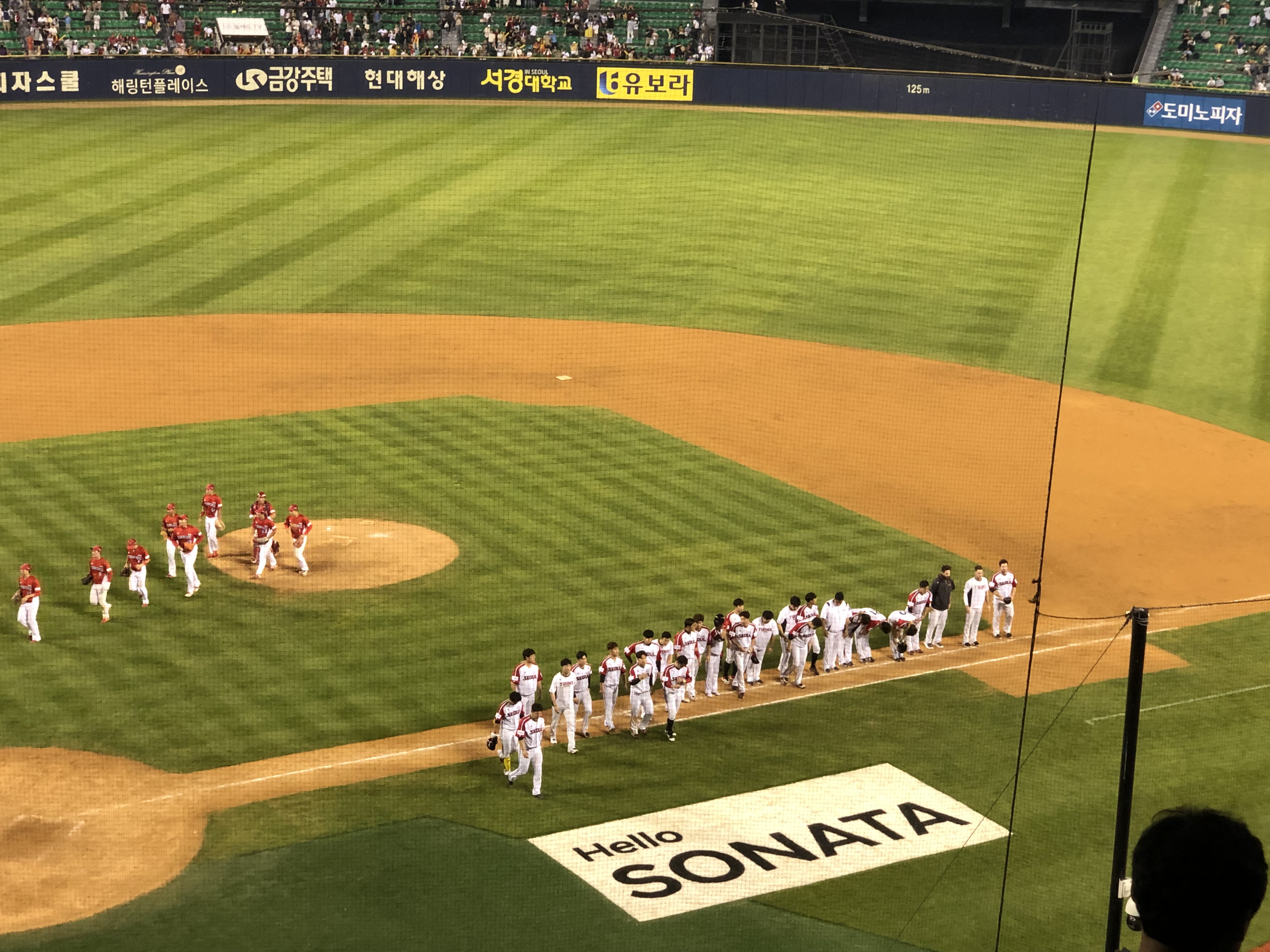
Jamsil Baseball Stadium, home of the LG Twins

The club was established in 1982 as MBC Chungyong, owned by the Munhwa Broadcasting Corporation. In the first part of the 1982 season, the team played at Dongdaemun Baseball Stadium; in the second part of the season, they moved to their current home, Jamsil Baseball Stadium.

The Chungyong were initially led by player-manager Baek In-chun, who had spent 19 seasons in Japan's Nippon Professional Baseball. Aged 38, Baek led the league in hitting in 1982, with a record-setting .412 batting average. As manager, Baek brought the Japanese "small ball" technique to his team, focusing on sacrifice bunts, stolen bases, and sacrifice flies. Although the team finished above .500 in 1982, Baek was dismissed by the team after the season.

In 1989, the franchise was acquired by the LG Corporation, which renamed the team the LG Twins. The following year, the Twins won their first Korean Series title with Baek In-chun as their manager. In 1994, they won their second championship. The Korean Series MVP was Kim Yong-soo in both Series, and his jersey number 41 was later retired. However, after their Korean Series appearance in 2002, the team experienced an unsuccessful streak and did not make the postseason for eleven years. They earned the second seed in the regular season in 2013, qualifying and competing in the playoffs until ultimately being eliminated by the Doosan Bears. Between 2014 and 2022, the Twins made six postseason appearances, but failed to return to the Korean Series. In 2023, they reached their first Korean Series since 2002 by virtue of winning the regular season title. In the finals, the Twins, led by captain and Korean Series MVP Oh Ji-hwan, defeated the KT Wiz 4–1 in five games, ending the club's 29-year championship drought.

== Season-by-season records ==
Season	Stadium	League	Finish	Regular season									Postseason	Awards
Season	Stadium	League	Finish	Rank	Games	Wins	Losses	Draws	Win%	BA	HR	ERA	Postseason	Awards
MBC Chungyong
1982	Dongdaemun Baseball Stadium	KBO	3/6	3/6	40	22	18	0	.550	.282	65	3.51	Did not qualify	
1982	Jamsil Baseball Stadium	KBO	3/6	3/6	40	24	16	0	.600	.282	65	3.51	Did not qualify	
1983	Jamsil Baseball Stadium	KBO	2/6	3/6	50	25	24	1	.510	.256	45	2.72	Lost Korean Series vs. Haitai Tigers (0–1–4)	
1983	Jamsil Baseball Stadium	KBO	2/6	1/6	50	30	19	1	.612	.256	45	2.72	Lost Korean Series vs. Haitai Tigers (0–1–4)	
1984	Jamsil Baseball Stadium	KBO	4/6	3/6	50	27	22	1	.551	.253	47	3.19	Did not qualify	
1984	Jamsil Baseball Stadium	KBO	4/6	3/6	50	24	26	0	.480	.253	47	3.19	Did not qualify	
1985	Jamsil Baseball Stadium	KBO	5/6	5/6	55	24	31	0	.436	.246	37	3.24	Did not qualify	
1985	Jamsil Baseball Stadium	KBO	5/6	6/6	55	20	34	1	.370	.246	37	3.24	Did not qualify	
1986	Jamsil Baseball Stadium	KBO	3/7	4/7	54	28	22	4	.560	.265	37	2.78	Did not qualify	Kim Keon-woo (ROTY)
1986	Jamsil Baseball Stadium	KBO	3/7	3/7	54	31	19	4	.620	.265	37	2.78	Did not qualify	Kim Keon-woo (ROTY)
1987	Jamsil Baseball Stadium	KBO	5/7	5/7	54	24	27	3	.472	.258	36	3.36	Did not qualify	
1987	Jamsil Baseball Stadium	KBO	5/7	4/7	54	26	24	4	.519	.258	36	3.36	Did not qualify	
1988	Jamsil Baseball Stadium	KBO	6/7	7/7	54	17	35	2	.333	.260	42	3.95	Did not qualify	Lee Yong-chul (ROTY)
1988	Jamsil Baseball Stadium	KBO	6/7	6/7	54	23	29	2	.444	.260	42	3.95	Did not qualify	Lee Yong-chul (ROTY)
1989	Jamsil Baseball Stadium	KBO	6/7	6/7	120	49	67	4	.425	.252	42	4.28	Did not qualify	
LG Twins
1990	Jamsil Baseball Stadium	KBO	1/7	1/7	120	71	49	0	.592	.271	61	3.38	Won Korean Series vs. Samsung Lions (4–0)	Kim Dong-soo (ROTY)
1991	Jamsil Baseball Stadium	KBO	6/8	6/8	126	53	72	1	.425	.244	53	4.38	Did not qualify	
1992	Jamsil Baseball Stadium	KBO	7/8	7/8	126	53	70	3	.433	.257	108	4.29	Did not qualify	
1993	Jamsil Baseball Stadium	KBO	4/8	4/8	126	66	57	3	.536	.256	74	3.07	Won semi-playoff vs. OB Bears (2–1); Lost playoff vs. Samsung Lions (2–3)	
1994	Jamsil Baseball Stadium	KBO	1/8	1/8	126	81	45	0	.643	.282	88	3.14	Won Korean Series vs. Pacific Dolphins (4–0)	Yu Ji-hyeon (ROTY)
1995	Jamsil Baseball Stadium	KBO	3/8	2/8	126	74	48	4	.603	.257	79	3.21	Lost playoff vs. Lotte Giants (2–4)	
1996	Jamsil Baseball Stadium	KBO	7/8	7/8	126	50	71	5	.417	.246	98	4.11	Did not qualify	
1997	Jamsil Baseball Stadium	KBO	2/8	2/8	126	73	51	2	.587	.267	83	3.78	Won playoff vs. Samsung Lions (3–2); Lost Korean Series vs. Haitai Tigers (1–4)	Lee Byung-kyu (ROTY)
1998	Jamsil Baseball Stadium	KBO	2/8	3/8	126	63	62	1	.504	.267	100	4.18	Won semi-playoff vs. OB Bears (2–0); Won playoff vs. Samsung Lions (3–1); Lost Korean Series vs. Hyundai Unicorns (2–4)	
1999	Jamsil Baseball Stadium	Magic League	3/8	3/4	132	61	70	1	.466	.281	145	5.49	Did not qualify	
2000	Jamsil Baseball Stadium	Magic League	4/8	1/4	133	67	63	3	.515	.273	122	4.45	Lost playoff vs. Doosan Bears (2–4)	
2001	Jamsil Baseball Stadium	KBO	6/8	6/8	133	58	67	8	.464	.276	85	5.13	Did not qualify	
2002	Jamsil Baseball Stadium	KBO	2/8	4/8	133	66	61	6	.520	.261	100	3.94	Won semi-playoff vs. Hyundai Unicorns (2–0); Won playoff vs. Kia Tigers (3–2); Lost Korean Series vs. Samsung Lions (2–4)	
2003	Jamsil Baseball Stadium	KBO	6/8	6/8	133	60	71	2	.458	.249	106	4.01	Did not qualify	
2004	Jamsil Baseball Stadium	KBO	6/8	6/8	133	59	70	4	.457	.259	102	4.38	Did not qualify	
2005	Jamsil Baseball Stadium	KBO	6/8	6/8	126	54	71	1	.432	.260	105	4.90	Did not qualify	
2006	Jamsil Baseball Stadium	KBO	8/8	8/8	126	47	75	4	.385	.246	81	4.22	Did not qualify	
2007	Jamsil Baseball Stadium	KBO	5/8	5/8	126	58	62	6	.483	.268	78	4.34	Did not qualify	
2008	Jamsil Baseball Stadium	KBO	8/8	8/8	126	46	80	0	.365	.256	66	4.88	Did not qualify	
2009	Jamsil Baseball Stadium	KBO	7/8	7/8	133	54	75	4	.406	.278	129	5.42	Did not qualify	
2010	Jamsil Baseball Stadium	KBO	6/8	6/8	133	57	71	5	.445	.276	121	5.23	Did not qualify	
2011	Jamsil Baseball Stadium	KBO	6/8	6/8	133	59	72	2	.450	.266	94	4.15	Did not qualify	
2012	Jamsil Baseball Stadium	KBO	7/8	7/8	133	57	72	4	.442	.261	59	4.02	Did not qualify	
2013	Jamsil Baseball Stadium	KBO	3/9	2/9	128	74	54	0	.578	.282	59	3.72	Lost playoff vs. Doosan Bears (1–3)	
2014	Jamsil Baseball Stadium	KBO	4/9	4/9	128	62	64	2	.492	.279	90	4.58	Won semi-playoff vs. NC Dinos (3–1); Lost playoff vs. Nexen Heroes (1–3)	
2015	Jamsil Baseball Stadium	KBO	9/10	9/10	144	64	78	2	.451	.271	114	4.62	Did not qualify	
2016	Jamsil Baseball Stadium	KBO	4/10	4/10	144	71	71	2	.500	.290	118	5.10	Won wild card vs. Kia Tigers (1–1); Won semi-playoff vs. Nexen Heroes (3–1); Lost playoff vs. NC Dinos (1–3)	
2017	Jamsil Baseball Stadium	KBO	6/10	6/10	144	69	72	3	.489	.281	110	4.32	Did not qualify	
2018	Jamsil Baseball Stadium	KBO	8/10	8/10	144	68	75	1	.476	.293	148	5.29	Did not qualify	
2019	Jamsil Baseball Stadium	KBO	4/10	4/10	144	79	64	1	.552	.267	94	3.86	Won wild card vs. NC Dinos (1–0); Lost semi-playoff vs. Kiwoom Heroes (1–3)	
2020	Jamsil Baseball Stadium	KBO	4/10	4/10	144	79	61	4	.564	.277	149	4.37	Won wild card vs. Kiwoom Heroes (1–0); Lost semi-playoff vs. Doosan Bears (0–2)	
2021	Jamsil Baseball Stadium	KBO	4/10	3/10	144	72	58	14	.554	.250	110	3.57	Lost semi-playoff vs. Doosan Bears (1–2)	
2022	Jamsil Baseball Stadium	KBO	3/10	2/10	144	87	55	2	.613	.269	118	3.33	Lost playoff vs. Kiwoom Heroes (1–3)	
2023	Jamsil Baseball Stadium	KBO	1/10	1/10	144	86	56	2	.606	.279	93	3.67	Won Korean Series vs. KT Wiz (4–1)	
2024	Jamsil Baseball Stadium	KBO	3/10	3/10	144	76	66	2	.535	.283	115	4.63	Won semi-playoff vs. KT Wiz (3–2); Lost playoff vs. Samsung Lions (1–3)	
2025	Jamsil Baseball Stadium	KBO	1/10	1/10	144	85	56	3	.603	.278	130	3.79	Won Korean Series vs. Hanwha Eagles (4–1)	
2026	Jamsil Baseball Stadium	KBO	4/10	4/10	144	78	65	1	.545	.264	136	4.81	Won wild card vs. Doosan Bears (1–0); Lost semi-playoff vs. Kia Tigers (0–3)	

== Team ==
=== Managers ===
- Baek In-chun (1982)
- Kim Dong-yeop (1983)
- Eo Woo-hong (1984–1985)
- Kim Dong-yeob (1986–1987)
- Yu Baek-man (1988)
- Bae Seong-seo (1989)
- Baek In-chun (1989–1991)
- Lee Kwang-hwan (1992–1994)
- Cheon Bo-seong (1995–1999)
- Lee Gwang-eun (2000–2001)
- Kim Sung-keun (2002)
- Lee Kwang-hwan (2003)
- Lee Sun-cheol (2004–2006)
- Kim Jae-bak (2007–2009)
- Park Jong-hun (2010–2011)
- Kim Ki-tae (2012–2014)
- Yang Sang-moon (2014–2017)
- Ryu Joong-il (2018–2020)
- Ryu Ji-hyun (2021–2022)
- Youm Kyoung-youb (2022–present)

== In popular culture ==
The team featured prominently in the tvN drama Reply 1994, where the team's 1994 head coach is a main character. In the drama, the team is referenced under a different name, "Seoul Twins" (Korean: 서울 쌍둥이), due to trademark issues with the LG Corporation.

In 2023, TVING released the original documentary Our Game: LG Twins, directed by Lee Hyun-hee, covering behind-the-scenes stories inside and outside the stadium. It received praise for its unique documentary and became the best original documentary in TVING's history in terms of paid subscriptions.
