= Lee Yu-chan =

South Korean baseball player (born 1998)

Doosan Bears – No. 7
- Infielder
- Born: August 5, 1998 (age 28); Incheon, South Korea
- Bats: Right Throws: Right

KBO debut
- May 9, 2018, for the Doosan Bears

KBO statistics (through 2025 season)
- Batting average: .254
- Home runs: 6
- Runs batted in: 66
- Stats at Baseball Reference

Teams
- Doosan Bears (2018–2020, 2022–present)

Lee Yu-chan (Korean: 이유찬; born August 5, 1998) is a South Korean professional baseball infielder who is currently playing for the Doosan Bears of the KBO League. His major position is shortstop. He graduated from Bugil Academy and was selected for the Doosan Bears by a draft in 2017 (2nd draft, 5th round).
