= Kim Seung-youn =

South Korean businessman

- Hangul: 김승연
- Hanja: 金昇淵
- RR: Gim Seungyeon
- MR: Kim Sŭngyŏn

Kim Seung-youn (Korean: 김승연; Hanja: 金昇淵; born February 7, 1952) is a South Korean businessman. He is currently the chairman of Hanwha Group. and the eldest son of Kim Chong-hee, the founder of Hanwha. He was the former Head of the Bugil Education Foundation as well as that of Bugil Academy and Bugil Girls' Academy until 2014.

Kim is the owner of the Hanwha Eagles of the KBO.
