= 2022 Korean Series =

Team (Wins)	Managers	Season
SSG Landers (4)	Kim Won-hyong	88–52–4 (.629)
Kiwoom Heroes (2)	Hong Won-ki	80–62–2 (.563)
- Dates: November 1 – 8
- MVP: Kim Kang-min

The 2022 Korean Series was the championship series of the 2022 KBO League season. It was a best-of-seven playoff and began on November 1. The SSG Landers clinched the best record of the 2022 season, and directly advanced to the Korean Series. They faced the Kiwoom Heroes, who defeated the LG Twins in the KBO League playoffs.

== Summary ==
SSG Landers (4) vs. Kiwoom Heroes (2)

Game	Date	Score	Location	Time	Attendance
1	November 1	Kiwoom Heroes – 7, SSG Landers – 6	Incheon SSG Landers Field	4:19	22,500
2	November 2	Kiwoom Heroes – 1, SSG Landers – 6	Incheon SSG Landers Field	3:09	22,500
3	November 4	SSG Landers – 8, Kiwoom Heroes – 2	Gocheok Sky Dome	3:50	16,300
4	November 5	SSG Landers – 3, Kiwoom Heroes – 6	Gocheok Sky Dome	3:39	16,300
5	November 7	Kiwoom Heroes – 4, SSG Landers – 5	Incheon SSG Landers Field	3:14	22,500
6	November 8	Kiwoom Heroes – 3, SSG Landers – 4	Incheon SSG Landers Field	2:37	22,500

== Matchups ==
=== Game 1 ===
November 1, 2022 18:30 KST at Incheon SSG Landers Field
Team	1	2	3	4	5	6	7	8	9	10	R	H	E
Kiwoom Heroes	0	0	0	0	2	2	0	0	2	1	7	8	1
SSG Landers	0	1	1	0	1	1	0	1	1	0	6	12	2
WP: Kim Jae-woong (1-0) LP: Shawn Morimando (0-1); Home runs: KIW: Jeon Byeong-woo (1); SSG: Choi Jeong (1), Kim Kang-min (1); Boxscore

=== Game 2 ===
November 2, 2022 18:30 KST at Incheon SSG Landers Field
Team	1	2	3	4	5	6	7	8	9	R	H	E
Kiwoom Heroes	0	0	1	0	0	0	0	0	0	1	7	0
SSG Landers	3	0	0	0	2	0	1	0	–	6	10	0
WP: Wilmer Font (1-0) LP: Tyler Eppler (0-1); Home runs: KIW: None; SSG: Choi Ji-hoon (1), Han Dong-min (1); Boxscore

=== Game 3 ===
November 4, 2022 18:30 KST at Gocheok Sky Dome
Team	1	2	3	4	5	6	7	8	9	R	H	E
SSG Landers	0	0	0	0	0	0	0	2	6	8	14	0
Kiwoom Heroes	0	0	0	1	0	0	0	0	1	2	8	2
WP: Kim Taek-hyeong (1-0) LP: Kim Dong-hyeok (0-1); Home runs: SSG: Juan Lagares (1); KIW: None; Boxscore

=== Game 4 ===
November 5, 2022 14:00 KST at Gocheok Sky Dome
Team	1	2	3	4	5	6	7	8	9	R	H	E
SSG Landers	1	0	0	0	0	0	2	0	0	3	7	2
Kiwoom Heroes	0	1	5	0	0	0	0	0	–	6	11	2
WP: Yang Hyun (1-0) LP: Shawn Morimando (0-2) Sv: Choi Won-tae (1 Save); Home runs: SSG: None; KIW: None; Boxscore

=== Game 5 ===
November 7, 2022 18:30 KST at Incheon SSG Landers Field
Team	1	2	3	4	5	6	7	8	9	R	H	E
Kiwoom Heroes	2	1	0	0	0	1	0	0	0	4	8	1
SSG Landers	0	0	0	0	0	0	0	2	3	5	6	1
WP: Noh Kyung-eun (1-0) LP: Choi Won-tae (0-1); Home runs: KIW: None; SSG: Choi Jeong (1), Kim Kang-min (1); Boxscore

=== Game 6 ===
November 8, 2022 18:30 KST at Incheon SSG Landers Field
Team	1	2	3	4	5	6	7	8	9	R	H	E
Kiwoom Heroes	0	0	2	0	0	1	0	0	0	3	5	3
SSG Landers	0	0	2	0	0	2	0	0	–	4	6	0
WP: Wilmer Font (2-0) LP: Eric Jokisch (0-1) Sv: Kwang-hyun Kim (1 Save); Home runs: KIW: Lim Dong-hui (1), Lee Jung-hoo (1); SSG: None; Boxscore

== See also ==
- 2022 Japan Series
- 2022 World Series
