= Hyun-jin Ryu =

Korean baseball player (born 1987)

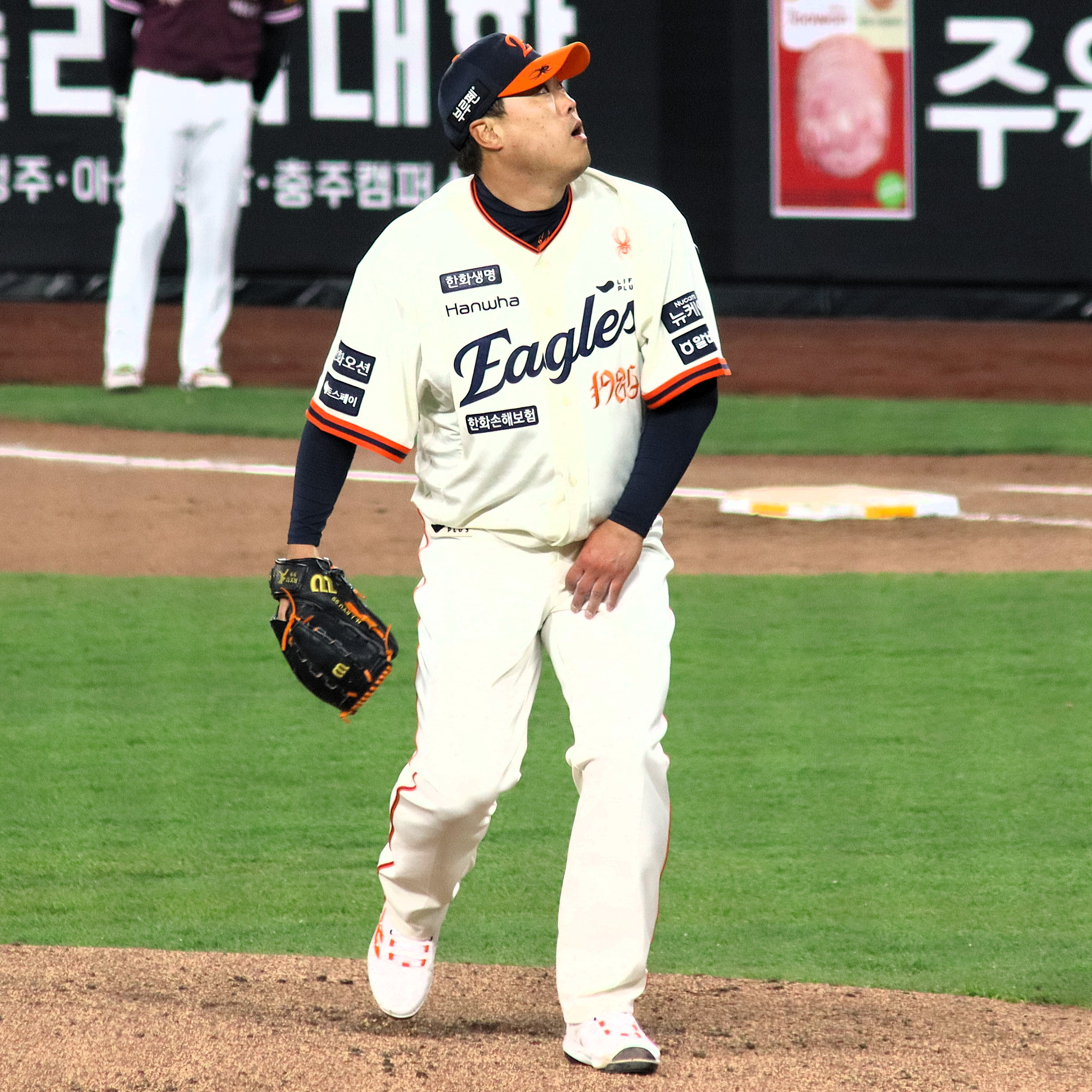
- Ryu with the Hanwha Eagles in 2025

Hanwha Eagles – No. 99
- Pitcher
- Born: March 25, 1987 (age 39); Incheon, South Korea
- Bats: Right Throws: Left

Professional debut
- KBO: April 12, 2006, for the Hanwha Eagles
- MLB: April 2, 2013, for the Los Angeles Dodgers

KBO statistics (through 2025)
- Win–loss record: 117–67
- Earned run average: 2.95
- Strikeouts: 1,495

MLB statistics
- Win–loss record: 78–48
- Earned run average: 3.27
- Strikeouts: 934
- Stats at Baseball Reference

Teams
- Hanwha Eagles (2006–2012); Los Angeles Dodgers (2013–2014, 2016–2019); Toronto Blue Jays (2020–2023); Hanwha Eagles (2024–present)

Career highlights and awards
- KBO: Korean Triple Crown (2006); 7× KBO All-Star (2006–2012); KBO MVP (2006); KBO Rookie of the Year (2006); 2× KBO Golden Glove Award (2006, 2010); 5× KBO strikeout champion (2006–2007, 2009–2010, 2012); 2× KBO ERA champion (2006, 2010); MLB: All-Star (2019); MLB ERA leader (2019)
Medals
Men's baseball
Representing South Korea
World Baseball Classic
Silver medal – second place	2009 Los Angeles	Team
Olympics
Gold medal – first place	2008 Beijing	Team
Asian Games
Bronze medal – third place	2006 Doha	Team
Gold medal – first place	2010 Guangzhou	Team

- Hyun-jin Ryu
- Hangul: 류현진
- Hanja: 柳賢振
- RR: Ryu Hyeonjin
- MR: Ryu Hyŏnjin

Hyun-jin Ryu (Korean: 류현진; Hanja: 柳賢振; pronounced [ɾju.çʌndʑin]; born March 25, 1987) is a South Korean professional baseball pitcher for the Hanwha Eagles of the KBO League. He has previously played in Major League Baseball (MLB) for the Los Angeles Dodgers and Toronto Blue Jays.

In 2013, after spending seven seasons with the Eagles, he became the first player from the KBO to join an MLB team via the posting system. During the 2018 World Series, Ryu became the first Korean pitcher to start in a World Series game. In 2019, he finished second in National League Cy Young Award voting and was named an All-Star for the first time. That year, he led MLB in earned run average (ERA) and had a 1.26 ERA after 14 starts, the lowest by a Dodgers pitcher since the statistic became official in 1912.

After pitching four seasons for the Blue Jays, Ryu returned to Korea in 2024.

== Early life and education ==
Ryu was born in Incheon, South Korea on March 25, 1987, and attended Incheon's Dongsan High School. He is working towards a master's degree in community physical education in Daejeon University. When Ryu was 10, his father bought him a lefthander's glove that goes on the right hand, so Ryu learned to pitch with his left hand.

== Career ==
=== Amateur ===
In 2004, Ryu underwent Tommy John surgery and did not pitch in any official games. In 2005, he led his team to the Blue Dragon Open National High School Championship, pitching 22 consecutive scoreless innings as the team's ace and batting .389 in the tournament. He was named Best Pitcher.

In 2005, Ryu was selected for the South Korea junior national team that was runner-up in the sixth Asian Junior Baseball Championship in Seoul, South Korea. Ryu started the semifinal match against Chinese Taipei, and helped his team reach the final, recording ten strikeouts and giving up one unearned run on four hits in six innings. During the competition, he pitched 8 1/3 innings with 14 strikeouts, and gave up an unearned run on five hits in three games (one start).

He competed at the 60th National High School Baseball Championship in 2005, when as a third-year student in high school. In the game against Seongnam High School in the quarterfinals, he pitched a shutout, striking out 17.

=== Hanwha Eagles (2006–2012) ===
In July 2005, Ryu was selected by the Hanwha Eagles as the 1st pick in the second round of the 2006 KBO League Draft, and made his professional debut on April 12, 2006. In his rookie year of 2006, Ryu finished with an 18–6 win–loss record, a 2.23 ERA and 205 strikeouts in 201.2 innings pitched. He earned the pitching Triple Crown, and was eventually named both Rookie of the Year and Player of the Year. He became the only player in KBO history to win both the Rookie of the Year award and the MVP award in the same season.

In the 2006 season, at the age of 19, he became the first Korean player to win the Rookie of the Year and MVP at the same time in 25 years, and the second pitcher to win the Triple Crown after Sun Dong-yol.

In 2006, he participated in the Asian Games.

In August 2008, Ryu competed for the South Korea national baseball team in the 2008 Summer Olympics, where they won the gold medal in the baseball tournament. In the team's third game of round-robin play, Ryu pitched a 1–0 complete-game shutout victory over Canada, giving up five hits. In the gold medal game against Cuba, he pitched 8 1/3 innings, allowing two earned runs in a 3–2 victory.

In March 2009, he represented the South Korea national baseball team in the 2009 World Baseball Classic, where the team was the runner-up to the eventual champion, Japan. In 2010, Ryu played in the 2010 Asian Games, where South Korea won the gold medal in baseball. On May 11, 2010, Ryu became the first pitcher in history to strike out 17 batters in a nine-inning game, against the LG Twins at Cheongju Sports Complex Baseball Stadium.

In 2012, Ryu finished with a 2.66 ERA and 210 strikeouts, but earned only a 9–9 win–loss record and ten no decisions. Ryu repeatedly expressed his desire to play in the United States for Major League Baseball and scouts from many MLB teams visited Korea to see Ryu's pitching. Finally, on October 29, 2012, the Eagles announced that Ryu would be posted as early as November 1, 2012, to allow MLB teams to bid for the right to negotiate with him.

=== Los Angeles Dodgers (2013–2019) ===
On November 9, 2012, the Eagles accepted the reported bid of $25.7M from the Los Angeles Dodgers, giving them a 30-day period to try to negotiate a contract with Ryu. On December 9, he was signed to a six-year, $36 million deal, that included the option to opt out after the fifth year if certain performance benchmarks were reached (750 innings pitched by year 5, an average of 150 innings/year).

==== 2013 ====
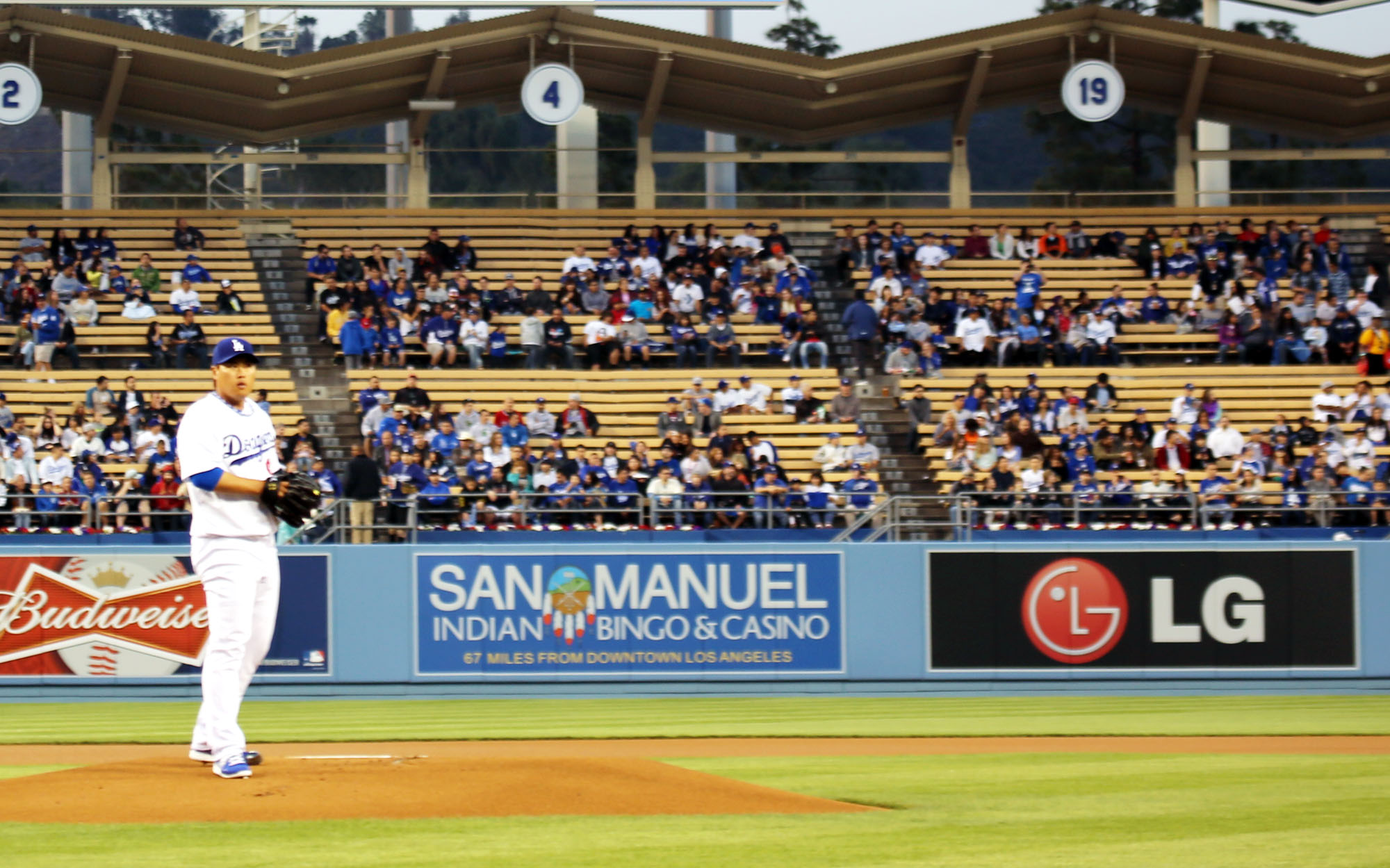
Ryu pitching at Dodger Stadium in April 2013.

On March 17, 2013, Ryu recorded his first win as a Dodger, albeit in a spring training game on St. Patrick's Day. He allowed just one run in 5 2/3 innings, and retired the final 11 men he faced. He struck out six and allowed just five to reach base.

Ryu made his Major League Baseball debut in a start against the San Francisco Giants on April 2, 2013. He allowed 10 hits in 6.1 innings but only one earned run. Ryu picked up his first Major League win on April 7 over the Pittsburgh Pirates. On April 13 against the Arizona Diamondbacks, he recorded his first major league hit with a double in the third inning. He wound up 3 for 3 at the plate in the game, the first Dodgers pitcher to get three hits in a game since Randy Wolf in 2009. This game was also his 100th career win, in South Korea and the U.S. combined.

On May 1, 2013, Ryu pitched six innings against the Colorado Rockies and struck out 12 batters, his highest strikeout count in an MLB game so far.

On May 28, 2013, Ryu pitched a complete-game shutout against the Los Angeles Angels of Anaheim, striking out seven batters, walking none, and conceding only two hits. It was the first shutout in Ryu's MLB career and the first shutout for a Korean-born pitcher since Chan Ho Park and Sun-woo Kim. In 30 starts with the Dodgers in 2013, Ryu was 14–8 with a 3.00 ERA. He was selected by Baseball America to their annual "All-Rookie team".

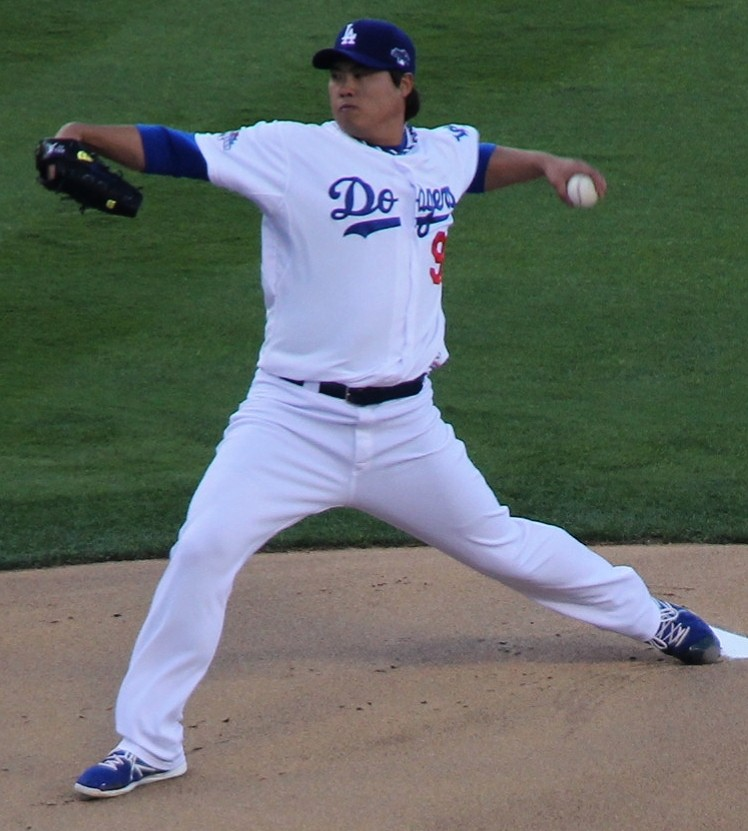
Ryu pitching in October 2013.

On October 6, 2013, Ryu became the first South Korean to serve as the starting pitcher of a Major League Baseball postseason game.

==== 2014 ====
In his first start of the 2014 season in Sydney, Australia, Ryu held the D-backs scoreless in five innings of work. He proceeded to start 26 games for the Dodgers in 2014, despite missing time with various injuries. He finished 14–7 with a 3.38 ERA.

==== 2015 ====
Ryu began spring training with optimism that he would be able to pitch a career high 200 innings in 2015. However, he was shut down early in camp with back tightness, though he said he was not concerned by it. When he started throwing again he experienced a sore shoulder and the Dodgers decided to shut him down for two weeks. Despite report that Ryu was pain free in April, the Dodgers took precautions and placed him on the 60-day disabled list on May 4 in view of his sporadic shoulder pain during the previous season. The Dodgers noted a lack of velocity in his bullpen session soon afterwards, and Ryu decided to have a surgery on his shoulder to alleviate the problem. On May 21, Ryu had a surgery to repair his left shoulder labrum and ended his chances of pitching during the 2015 season.

==== 2016 ====
Ryu eventually rejoined the Dodgers on July 7, 2016, and started against the San Diego Padres. He allowed eight hits, four of them for extra bases in 4 2/3 innings of a 6–0 loss. However, he reported elbow discomfort after the game and was placed back on the disabled list. On September 28, he underwent debridement surgery on his left elbow.

==== 2017 ====
After losing his first four decisions of the season, Ryu picked up his first major league win since the 2014 season on April 30, 2017, in a 5–3 win against the Philadelphia Phillies. On May 25, he pitched four scoreless innings out of the bullpen to pick up his first major league save in a 7–4 win against the St. Louis Cardinals. Ryu made 24 starts in 2017 for the Dodgers (and one relief appearance) and was 5–9 with a 3.77 ERA, 116 strikeouts and 45 walks.

==== 2018 ====
Ryu began the season 3–0 with a 2.12 ERA in 6 starts before landing on the disabled list with a groin injury. He was placed on the 60-day disabled list on June 2, 2018. Overall, Ryu made 15 starts with the team, going 7–3 with 1.97 ERA, posting 85 strikeouts and 15 walks. On October 24, 2018, Ryu became the first Korean pitcher to start in a World Series game when he started in Game 2 of the series at Fenway Park in Boston. Ryu became a free agent after the season, but accepted the Dodgers one-year, $17.9 million, qualifying offer to remain with the club for 2019.

==== 2019 ====
Ryu was named the Dodgers opening day starter for the 2019 season after injuries to Clayton Kershaw and Rich Hill. On May 7, 2019, Ryu pitched his second career complete-game shutout against the Atlanta Braves. He struck out six, walked none, and gave up four hits in the 9–0 victory. In his next start against the Washington Nationals on May 12, 2019, he had a no-hit bid before giving a double to Gerardo Parra in the eighth inning with one out. He finished the game with 8 innings pitched, struck out nine, walked one, and gave up that one hit in a 6–0 win against the Washington Nationals. His two pitching performances earned him NL Player of the Week. He followed this performance with 7 shutout innings against the Cincinnati Reds on May 19, 2019, extending his streak of consecutive scoreless innings pitched to 31. This streak is tied for the tenth longest in Dodgers' history and is 28 fewer than the team record of 59 set by Orel Hershiser in 1988. Ryu won MLB Pitcher of the Month in May, going 5–0 with a 0.59 ERA, striking out 36 batters, walking 3 batters, while allowing three earned runs. He was selected to be the National League's starting pitcher for his first all-star appearance at the 2019 MLB All-Star Game. On September 22, Ryu hit his first career home run off of Antonio Senzatela of the Colorado Rockies. He finished the regular season with a record of 14–5, an MLB season-leading ERA of 2.32 and the lowest walks per nine innings ratio of 1.183. Ryu came in second in voting for the National League Cy Young Award.

=== Toronto Blue Jays (2020–2023) ===
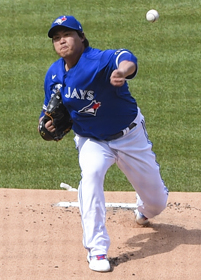
Ryu pitching with the Blue Jays in 2020

On December 27, 2019, Ryu signed a four-year, $80 million contract with the Toronto Blue Jays.

Due to the COVID-19 pandemic, the Blue Jays 2020 season did not begin until July 24. On this day, Hyun-jin made his Blue Jays debut as the Opening Day starting pitcher, throwing 4 2/3 innings in Toronto's 6–4 victory over the Tampa Bay Rays. He went on to finish the regular season with a 5–2 record over 12 starts with a 2.69 ERA over 62 innings pitched with 72 strikeouts and 17 walks. On September 24, 2020, in his final regular season start, Ryu became the first Blue Jays' starting pitcher in that season to pitch into the seventh inning and the second starter to throw 100 pitches, while also yielding zero runs, five hits, and two walks, while compiling four strikeouts and the winning decision in a 4–1 victory over the New York Yankees to help clinch the Blue Jays' first postseason berth since 2016. He finished third in voting for the 2020 American League Cy Young award, and won the Warren Spahn Award, presented each season by the Oklahoma Sports Museum to the best left-handed pitcher in Major League Baseball (MLB).

Hyun-jin made 31 starts for Toronto in 2021, pitching to a 14–10 record and 4.37 ERA with 143 strikeouts and 37 walks in 169.0 innings of work. In 2022, Ryu made six starts for the Blue Jays, limping to a 2–0 record and 5.67 ERA with 16 strikeouts in 27.0 innings pitched. On June 2, 2022, he was pulled from a start against the Chicago White Sox shortly after reaching 1,000 career innings pitched. He was later diagnosed with damage to his ulnar collateral ligament and underwent Tommy John surgery on June 18. On August 1, 2023, Ryu made his season debut and his first start in a year with the Blue Jays in a 3–13 losing effort against the Baltimore Orioles. He became a free agent following the season.

=== Hanwha Eagles (2024–present) ===
On February 20, 2024, Ryu reached an agreement to return to South Korea to play for his old team, the Hanwha Eagles, for eight years and 17 billion won, the largest contract in KBO League history.

== Pitching style ==
Sample of Ryu's pitching motion. Click to expand.

Ryu is a 6 ft 3 in (1.91 m), 255 lb left-handed pitcher. He throws a fastball sitting 89–92 mph (tops out at 95 mph), a cutter, a curveball, a slider, and a change-up. Scouts say that the change-up is his best pitch and is a legitimate out-pitch at the big league level. Ryu has also drawn attention for his ability to locate his pitches within the strike zone. He posted a BB/9 (walks per nine innings rate) of 2.0 in his MLB career.

Through the 2019 season, Ryu is the only pitcher born in Asia with a sub 3.00 career ERA (minimum of 500 innings pitched) in major league history. His MLB career ERA is 3.27 through the 2023 season.

== Popularity ==
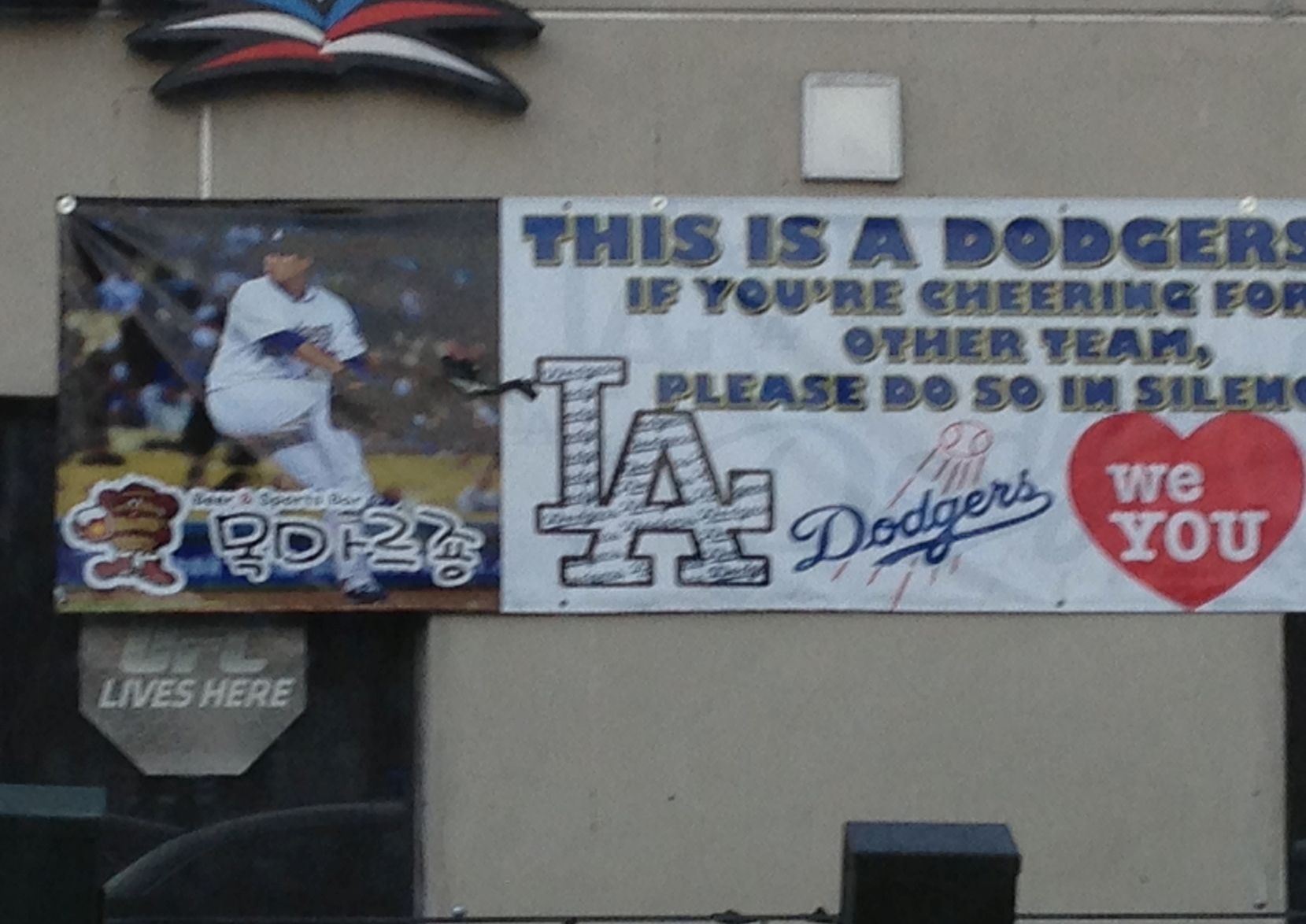
A banner supporting Ryu hangs in Koreatown in Los Angeles in July 2013.

Ryu enjoys a popularity amongst South Korean baseball players, drawing South Korean fans as well as fans of Korean ancestry in nearly every stadium he pitches in. On July 22, 2013, after a 14–5 win against the Toronto Blue Jays played at Rogers Centre, several hundred fans of Korean ancestry stayed after the game to give Ryu a standing ovation, a common practice during the game, but a rarity for an ovation to occur after the game.

Following Ryu's departure to the Major League Baseball in 2012, the Hanwha Eagles informally withdrew his jersey number, 99, and no player has worn it since for the South Korean club.

== Personal life ==
Ryu married Korean sports reporter Bae Ji-hyun on January 5, 2018. The wedding was officiated by Kim In-sik, Ryu's first manager at Hanwha. The couple announced on October 11, 2019, that they were expecting their first child. Their daughter was born on May 17, 2020. Later, on July 24, 2022, Ryu announced his wife was pregnant with their second child. Their second child, a son, was born in Toronto on September 29, 2022. In another story, he appeared on Lee Dae-ho's YouTube channel and revealed that he taught Kershaw the changeup, but mentioned that Kershaw struggled with it due to his pitching form.

== In popular culture ==
- Ryu has appeared in Running Man, with Shin-Soo Choo on episode 119; Bae Suzy on eps 171, 172 and 173; with Kang Jung-ho on ep 227; and with Kwang-hyun Kim on ep 534.
- Ryu made a cameo in Mr. Go, a sport-comedy about a gorilla who becomes a baseball superstar.
- Ryu has appeared in Master in the House (South Korean TV series) on episodes 152 and 153

== International competition ==
Year	Venue	Competition	Team	Individual note
2005	South Korea	Asian Junior Baseball Championship	Silver medal	0–0; 0.00 ERA (3 G, 8.1 IP, 0 ER, 14 K)
2006	Qatar	Asian Games	Bronze medal	0–0; 9.95 ERA (2 G, 6.1 IP, 7 ER, 6 K)
2007	Chinese Taipei	Asian Baseball Championship	Silver medal	1–0; 0.00 ERA (1 G, 5.0 IP, 0 ER, 5 K)
2008	Chinese Taipei	Final Olympic Qualification Tournament	Silver medal	0–1; 3.00 ERA (2 G, 6.0 IP, 2 ER, 7 K)
2008	China	Olympic Games	Gold medal	2–0; 1.04 ERA (2 G, 17.1 IP, 2 ER, 13 K)
2009	United States	World Baseball Classic	Silver medal	1–0; 2.57 ERA (5 G, 7.0 IP, 2 ER, 7 K)
2010	China	Asian Games	Gold medal	1–0; 3.60 ERA (2 G, 10.0 IP, 4 ER, 8 K)

== See also ==
- List of Major League Baseball players from South Korea
- List of World Series starting pitchers
- Los Angeles Dodgers award winners and league leaders
