= Kim Do-hyeon (baseball) =

South Korean baseball player (born 2000)

Kia Tigers – No. 60
- Pitcher
- Born: September 15, 2000 (age 25); Seoul, South Korea
- Bats: Right Throws: Right

KBO debut
- May 4, 2019, for the Hanwha Eagles

KBO statistics (through 2025)
- Win–loss record: 14-25
- Earned run average: 5.46
- Strikeouts: 210
- Stats at Baseball Reference

Teams
- Hanwha Eagles (2019–2022); Kia Tigers (2022, 2024–present)

Kim Do-hyeon (Korean: 김도현; born September 15, 2000, in Seoul) is a South Korean pitcher for the Kia Tigers of the KBO League.
