= Shin-Soo Choo =

South Korean baseball player (born 1982)

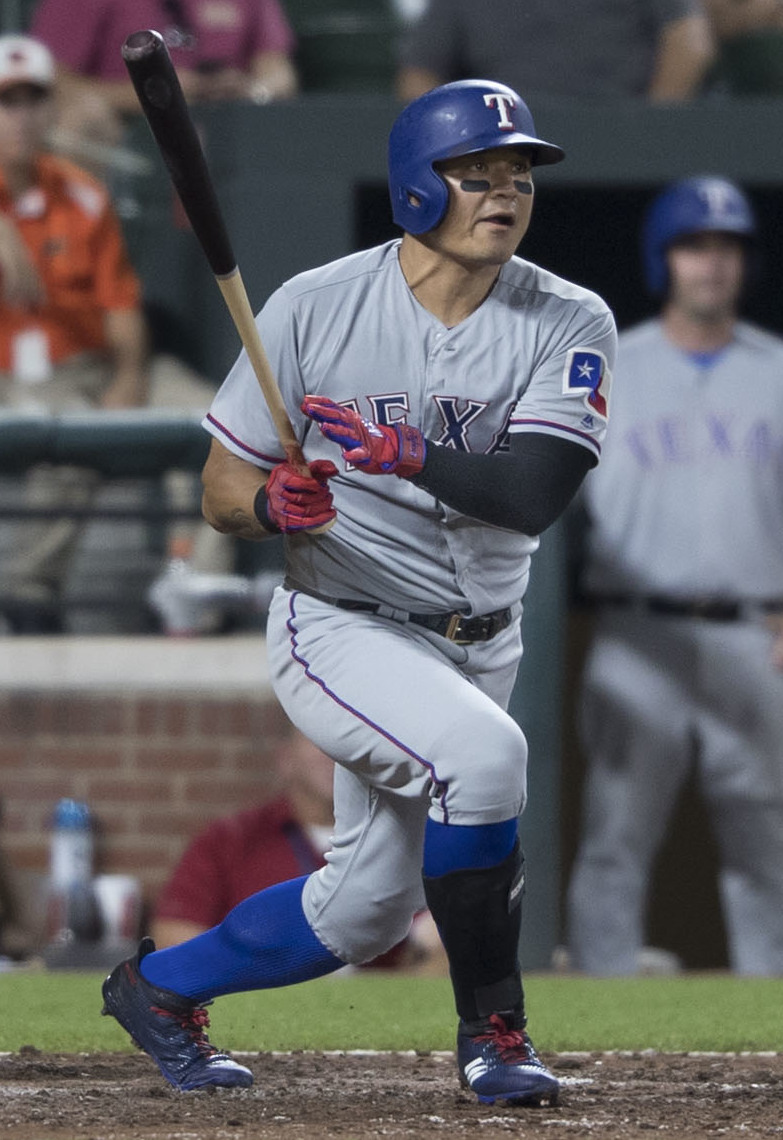
- Choo with the Texas Rangers in 2017
- Outfielder
- Born: July 13, 1982 (age 44); Busan, South Korea
- Batted: Left Threw: Left

Professional debut
- MLB: April 21, 2005, for the Seattle Mariners
- KBO: April 4, 2021, for the SSG Landers

Last appearance
- MLB: September 27, 2020, for the Texas Rangers
- KBO: October 1, 2024, for the SSG Landers

MLB statistics
- Batting average: .275
- Home runs: 218
- Runs batted in: 782

KBO statistics
- Batting average: .263
- Home runs: 54
- Runs batted in: 205
- Stats at Baseball Reference

Teams
- Seattle Mariners (2005–2006); Cleveland Indians (2006–2012); Cincinnati Reds (2013); Texas Rangers (2014–2020); SSG Landers (2021–2024)

Career highlights and awards
- MLB All-Star (2018); Korean Series champion (2022)
Medals
Men's baseball
Representing South Korea
World Baseball Classic
Silver medal – second place	2009 Los Angeles	Team
Asian Games
Gold medal – first place	2010 Guangzhou	Team
World Junior Baseball Championship
Gold medal – first place	2000 Edmonton	Team

- Shin-Soo Choo
- Hangul: 추신수
- Hanja: 秋信守
- RR: Chu Sinsu
- MR: Ch'u Sinsu

Shin-Soo Choo (Korean: 추신수; Hanja: 秋信守; Korean pronunciation: [tɕʰu.ɕin.su]; born July 13, 1982) is a South Korean former professional baseball outfielder. He played in Major League Baseball (MLB) for the Seattle Mariners, Cleveland Indians, Cincinnati Reds, and Texas Rangers before ending his career in the KBO League with the SSG Landers. Choo left MLB as the record holder for most career home runs (218) hit by an Asian-born player in the league, which was later passed by Shohei Ohtani.

Choo was selected as the Most Valuable Player (MVP) and Best Pitcher of the WBSC U-18 Baseball World Cup as South Korea won the event. Choo signed a $1.35 million contract with the Mariners after the championship and converted to the outfield. With the Cleveland Indians, Choo recorded two consecutive seasons of 20 home runs and 20 stolen bases. Before the 2014 season, he signed a $130 million contract with the Texas Rangers. In 2015, Choo became the first Asian-born player to hit for the cycle in MLB.

In 2018, Choo earned a selection to his first career Major League Baseball All-Star Game. During that season, he safely reached base in 52 consecutive games, the longest such single-season streak in Texas Rangers history. He also ranks 24th among all major leaguers in career hit by pitch, with 152. In 2021, Choo returned to South Korea to play in the KBO League, before retiring at the end of the 2024 KBO League season.

== Professional career ==
=== Seattle Mariners ===
On August 14, 2000, the Seattle Mariners signed Choo to a contract with a signing bonus estimated to be worth "between $1.2 million and $1.5 million". He was initially listed as both an outfielder and left-handed pitcher. Mariners scouting director Roger Jongewaard remarked that Choo was "the best kid in Asia that we've seen" and noted that they initially planned to play him in center field.

Choo made his professional debut in 2001 with the Rookie-level AZL Mariners, batting .302 with four home runs and 35 RBI in 51 games. He led the team in stolen bases (12), bases on balls (34), and strikeouts (49). His performance led to a late-season promotion to the Single-A Wisconsin Timber Rattlers, where he hit .462 with 3 RBI in three games.

In 2002, Choo spent most of the season with Wisconsin, batting .302 with six home runs, 48 RBI, and 34 stolen bases (in 55 attempts) in 119 games. On August 22, he was promoted to the Single-A San Bernardino Stampede. In 11 games, Choo hit .308 with a home run and 9 RBI. After the season, the Mariners named Choo as the Most Valuable Player for Single-A Wisconsin. His 37 total stolen bases ranked second in the organization, and his .303 average was tied for the fourth-best among Mariners farmhands.

Choo spent the entire 2003 season with the newly named Single-A Inland Empire 66ers, batting .286 with nine home runs and 55 RBI in 110 games, helping the team to a California League championship.

Making the leap to Double-A in 2004, Choo posted his best minor league season up to that point. He batted .315 with seven triples, 15 home runs, 84 RBI and 40 stolen bases in 132 games for the San Antonio Missions. He ranked among the Texas League leaders in several categories including triples (tied for second), RBI (third), stolen bases (third) and batting average (fifth). After the season, Choo was named Seattle's Minor League Player of the Year.

Choo began 2005 with the Triple-A Tacoma Rainiers. He was recalled to the majors for the first time on April 20 when Scott Spiezio was placed on the disabled list. Choo made his Major League Baseball debut on April 21, pinch hitting for Miguel Olivo and grounding out for the final out of the game. On May 3, he recorded his first career hit and RBI with a pinch hit single off Scot Shields of the Los Angeles Angels of Anaheim. After the game, Choo was optioned back to Tacoma. He was recalled again in September, and played out the remainder of the season with the Mariners. With Tacoma, Choo batted .282 with 11 home runs and 54 RBI in 115 games.

The first half of the 2006 season saw Choo return to Tacoma. In 94 games with the Rainiers, he batted .323 with 13 home runs and 48 RBI. On July 3, he was recalled by the Mariners. During his time in Seattle, Choo appeared in 17 total games, finishing with two hits in 29 at bats (.069 batting average) and one RBI.

=== Cleveland Indians ===
On July 26, 2006, Choo was traded to the Cleveland Indians along with minor leaguer Shawn Nottingham in exchange for first baseman Ben Broussard. Choo made his debut with the Indians two days later against his former team, and hit his first major league home run against Mariners pitcher Félix Hernández in a 1–0 Indians victory. In 45 games with the Indians, he batted .295 (43-for-146) with three home runs and 22 RBI.

Choo spent the first few weeks of the 2007 season with the Buffalo Bisons, Cleveland's Triple-A affiliate in the International League. He was called up on April 23, 2007, to take the place of the injured third baseman Andy Marte. He was optioned back to Buffalo on May 3. Choo missed several months of the 2007 season due to injury, and underwent Tommy John surgery on his left elbow in September 2007.

Choo began the 2008 season on the disabled list as he continued to recover from surgery. After a rehab assignment with Triple-A Buffalo, Choo was activated on May 31 and spent the rest of the season with the Indians. He finished the season (after 317 at-bats) with a .309 batting average, 98 hits, 14 home runs, and 66 RBI in 94 games. His hit and RBI totals were also a new record by a South Korean-born player in MLB. Thanks to a hot September where he put up a .400 batting average, 34 hits, five home runs, and 24 RBI, Choo was named the American League Player of the Month.

In February 2009, Choo signed a one-year contract with the Indians. During that season, he broke his own records for home runs, RBI, stolen bases and hits. On July 3, Choo hit two home runs and drove in a career-high seven runs in a 15–3 victory over the Oakland Athletics. On October 3, 2009, Choo hit his 20th home run of the season against Paul Byrd of the Boston Red Sox, thus making him a member of the 20-20 club. He became the first Asian to accomplish this feat in the Major Leagues. He was also the only player in the AL to have a .300 average, 20 home runs, and 20 stolen bases at the same time. He finished the season with a .300 batting average, 20 home runs, 21 steals, and 86 RBI in 156 games.

In a road game against the Kansas City Royals on September 17, 2010, Choo hit three home runs and recorded 7 RBI in an 11–4 win. He first hit a two-run homer 420 feet to right in the top of the fourth inning. In his next at bat he hit a towering grand slam to deep center. In the top of the eighth, Choo hit a 405-foot solo homer over the right field wall. Choo finished the game a three-run homer away from the elusive "home run cycle". On September 19, 2010, Choo again reached the 20-20 club of 20 home runs and 20 stolen bases for the second straight year. In 144 games, he batted .300 with 22 home runs, and set career-highs with 90 RBI and 22 stolen bases. He also led all AL right fielders in assists with 14.

Choo became eligible for arbitration after the 2010 season, and agreed to a one-year, $3.975 million deal. Choo finished the 2011 season with eight home runs, a .259 batting average, 12 stolen bases, and 36 RBI while accumulating 78 strikeouts and 36 walks in 313 at-bats. On June 24, Choo was hit by San Francisco Giants pitcher Jonathan Sánchez on his left thumb. The resulting fracture kept him out for six weeks. On August 23, during the first game of a double header against his former club, the Seattle Mariners, Choo hit a double in the third inning as an earthquake occurred. In the ninth inning of the same game, he hit his first walk-off home run, giving the Indians a 7–5 win. On September 1, Choo pulled a side muscle and was placed on the disabled list again, ending his season.

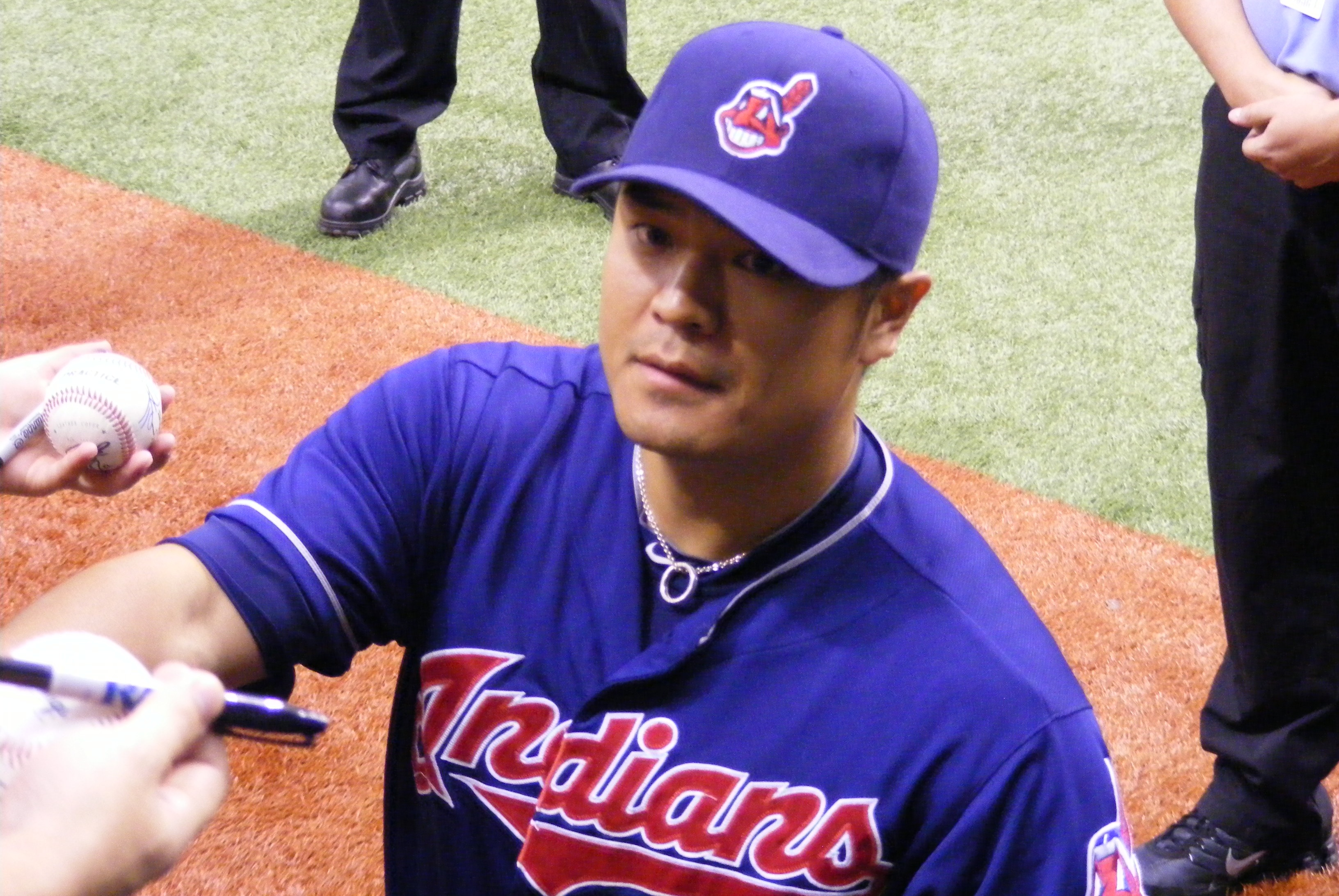
Choo signs autographs for fans prior to a game against the Tampa Bay Rays

On April 14, 2012, in a game against the Kansas City Royals which would see bench clearings by both teams, Choo was hit by Royals starter Jonathan Sánchez on his right knee. It was a pitch from Sánchez that hit Choo in 2011, resulting in a broken thumb and nearly two months on the disabled list. Choo would finish the game and win it for the Indians in the tenth inning when he hit a two-run double. On April 24, Choo left in the eighth inning in a game against the Royals after suffering a mild hamstring strain. Choo would return on May 2 in a 6–3 Indians win versus the Chicago White Sox. On May 24, in the series finale against the Detroit Tigers, Choo hit a second-deck home run off of Tigers starter Justin Verlander in the first inning. That was Choo's first career lead-off home run. The Indians won that game 2–1, finishing the sweep against the Tigers. Choo ended the season batting .283 with 16 home runs, 67 RBI and 21 stolen bases in 155 games.

=== Cincinnati Reds ===
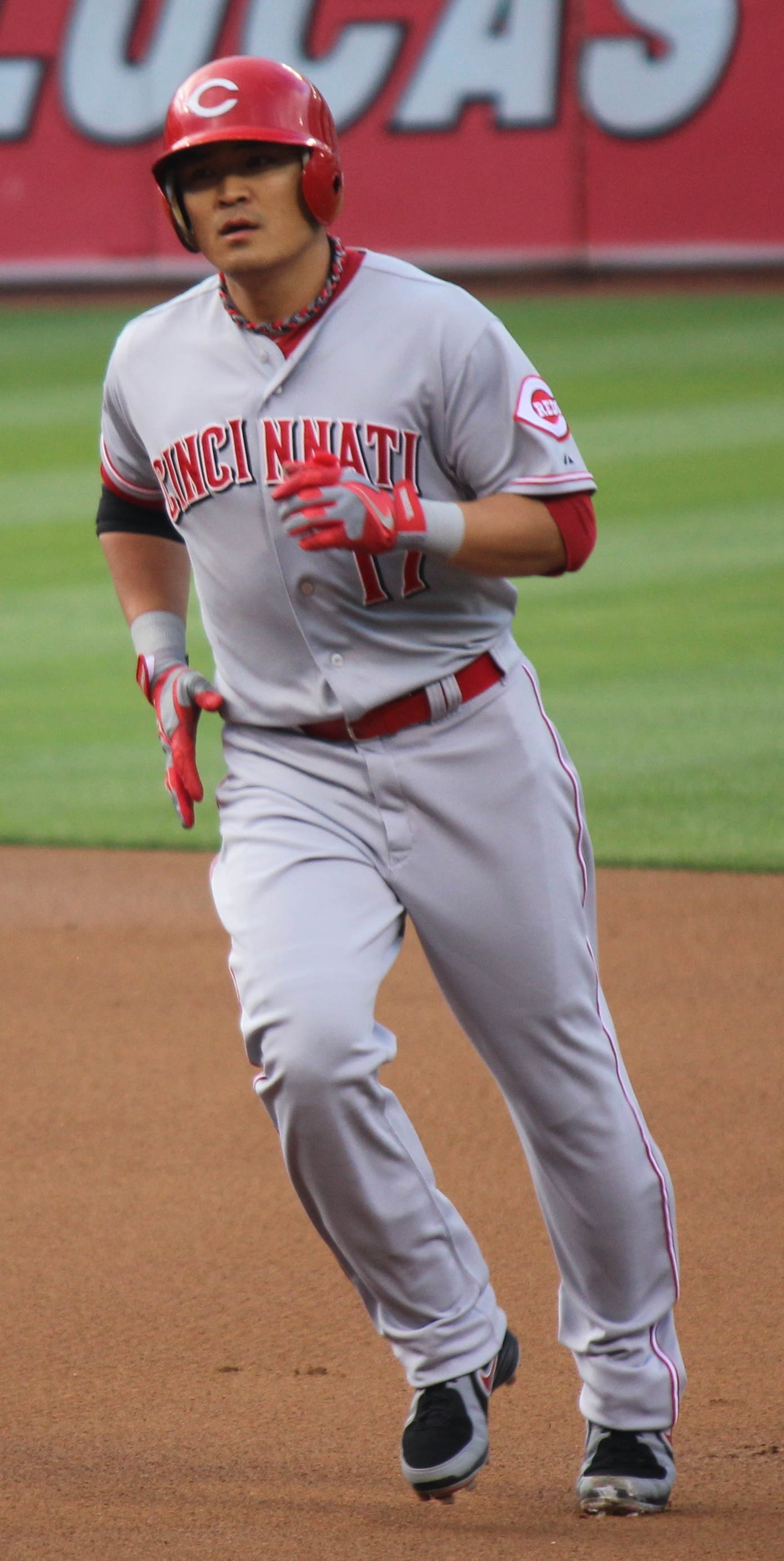
Choo with the Cincinnati Reds in 2013

On December 11, 2012, Choo was traded to the Cincinnati Reds along with Jason Donald in a three team, nine player deal also involving the Arizona Diamondbacks. The trade brought Trevor Bauer, Matt Albers, Bryan Shaw, and Drew Stubbs to the Cleveland Indians. On February 11, 2013, Choo avoided arbitration with his new team, the Reds, by agreeing to a one-year, $7.375 million deal, the exact midpoint between both sides.

On May 8, 2013, Choo hit a walk-off home run in the bottom of the ninth inning in a game with the Atlanta Braves. It was his second walk-off home run in Major League Baseball. On August 27 in a game against the St. Louis Cardinals, Choo hit his 100th career home run. On September 9, 2013, Choo set the Reds' team record for hit by pitches in a season. For the season, he batted .285 with 21 home runs, 54 RBI and 20 stolen bases in 154 games, marking his third career 20–20 season. Choo also led the major leagues in hit by pitch (26), and ranked among the National League leaders in several categories, including runs (107, second), on-base percentage (.423, second), walks (112, second), and on-base plus slugging (.885, eighth).

On October 1, 2013, Choo homered in the top of the eighth inning in the 2013 National League Wild Card Game against the Pittsburgh Pirates. He is the first South Korean batter to hit a home run in Major League Baseball postseason.

=== Texas Rangers ===
On December 21, 2013, it was reported that Choo had agreed to a seven-year, $130 million contract with the Texas Rangers, pending a physical examination. The Rangers officially introduced Choo on December 27. In his first season with the team, he battled ankle injuries and played in only 123 games while putting up a slash line of .242/.340/.374 with 13 home runs and 40 RBI; making 2014 the worst season of his career. It was a major blow to the Rangers as they heavily invested that he and newly acquired Prince Fielder would contribute to help the team win a division title. Instead, Choo was added unto the long list of injuries that kept the Rangers out of contention along with Fielder, Mitch Moreland, Matt Harrison, Derek Holland, and many others.

On July 21, 2015, Choo hit for the cycle against the Colorado Rockies at Coors Field. In doing so, he became the ninth player in Rangers history to hit for the cycle as well as the first Asian player in MLB to accomplish this feat. He vastly improved in 2015 compared to his injury-riddled 2014. In a crucial role, he hit .276 with 22 home runs and 82 RBI to go along with a .375 OBP in 149 games. Brandon Warne of FanGraphs noted that Choo's on-base percentage in 2015 was higher than his slugging percentage in 2014.

During the seventh inning of the deciding Game 5 of the 2015 American League Divisional Series, Choo was involved in a bizarre play which saw a routine throw back to the mound by Toronto Blue Jays catcher Russell Martin deflect off Choo's bat, resulting in an errant ball which then led to the runner on third base score a run. Since Choo was inside the batter's box, he was ruled to have not interfered on the play, thereby allowing the run to stand. This play was one of several notable plays in the seventh inning, which is considered to be among the most dramatic innings in playoff history. The Rangers went on to lose the game and series in five games. Choo hit .238 with four runs scored, a home run, two RBI and a walk in the series.

On April 10, 2016, the Rangers placed Choo on the 15-day disabled list with a strained right calf muscle. He was expected to miss 4–6 weeks. He returned on May 20 after missing 35 games. In his first game back, he left with hamstring tightness and was placed back on the DL. He was activated on June 13, and hit his first home run of the season in his return to lineup that day against the Oakland Athletics. On July 20, Choo was placed on the disabled list for third time in the season, this time for lower back inflammation. He returned on August 4 after a 13-game absence. On August 16, it was announced that Choo would miss the rest of the season when he was placed on the 15-day disabled list (his fourth stint on the DL that season) with a fracture in his left forearm. Limited to 42 games in 2016, he hit .242 with seven home runs and 17 RBI.

Choo managed to stay healthy in 2017, and finished the season slashing .261/.357/.423 with 22 home runs and 78 RBI in 149 games.

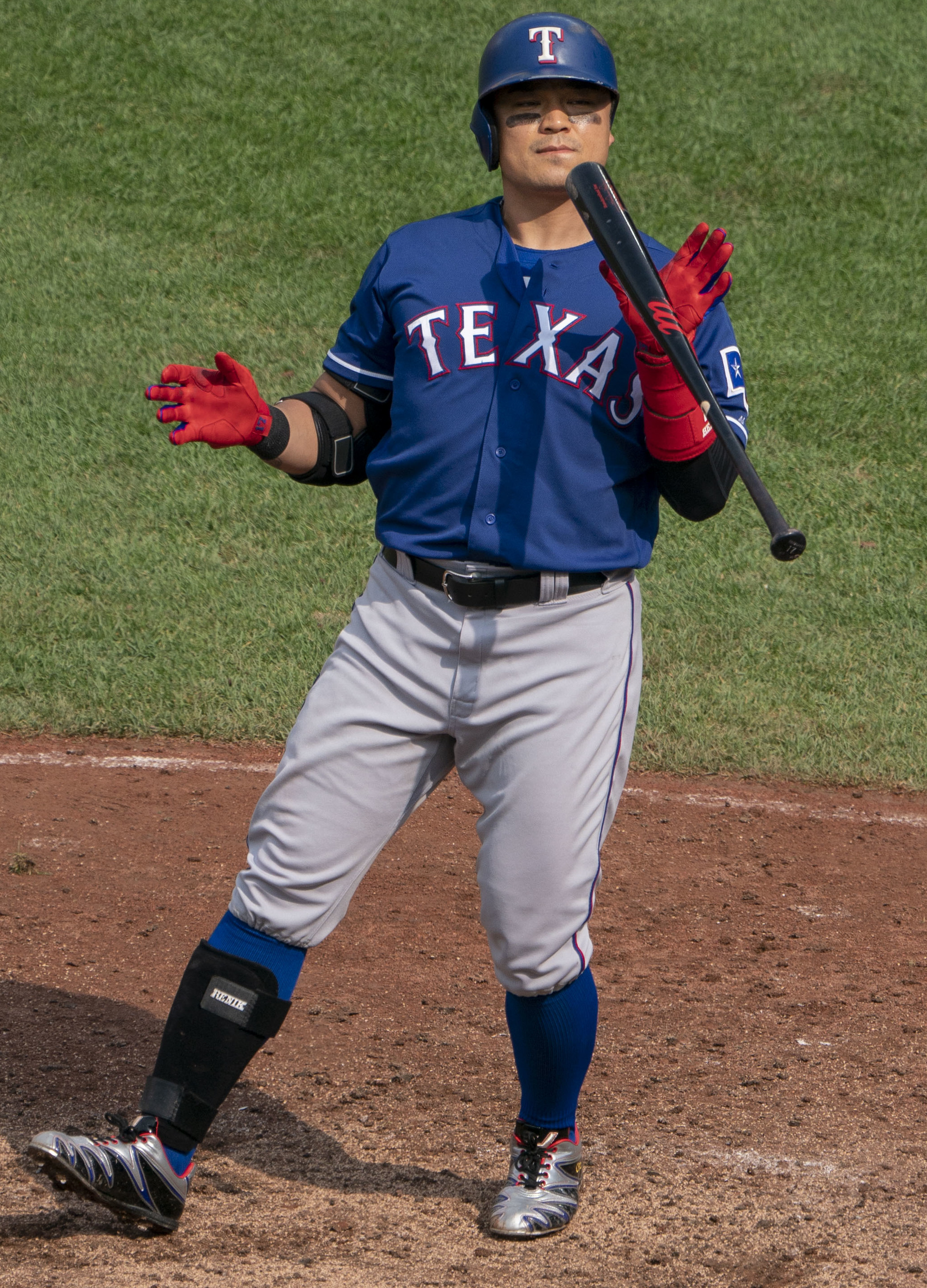
Choo with the Texas Rangers in 2018

On May 26, 2018, Choo hit a walk-off home run against Kevin McCarthy of the Kansas City Royals. With 176 career home runs, Choo surpassed Hideki Matsui for the most career home runs by a player born in Asia. Choo, having set a club record for reaching base in 47 consecutive games, was named to his first career All-Star Game in July. On July 20, Choo extended his on-base streak to 52 games with a lead-off single against the Cleveland Indians; the streak ended on July 21 in a second game against the Indians. Choo's 52-game on-base streak is the longest such single-season streak in Rangers franchise history. He ended the year batting .264 with 21 home runs and 62 RBI in 146 games. After the season, Choo was named the 2018 Texas Rangers Player of the Year by the DFW BBWAA chapter.

On April 4, 2019, Choo recorded his 1,500th career major league hit with a single against Matt Harvey of the Los Angeles Angels. In 2019, he hit .265/.371/.455/.826 with a career-high 24 home runs and 61 RBI in 151 games. He was the eighth-oldest player in the American League. Following the 2019 season, Choo underwent arthroscopic AC joint debridement surgery on his left shoulder.

During the COVID-19 pandemic-shortened season, Choo hit .236/.323/.400 with five home runs and 15 RBI in 33 games.

=== SSG Landers ===
On February 21, 2021, Choo agreed to a one-year, $2.4 million contract with the SSG Landers of the Korea Baseball Organization (KBO). Choo played in 136 games for the team in 2021, slashing .263/.409/.450 with 21 home runs and 69 RBI in 137 games. On November 16, 2021, Choo re-signed with the Landers on a one-year, $2.3 million contract.

On December 14, 2023, Choo announced that he would retire at the conclusion of the 2024 KBO season.

== World Baseball Classic ==
Choo was on the 2009 World Baseball Classic South Korean roster. Cleveland allowed Choo to play under the condition that he play only one game or less as an outfielder in the first round, and only in two non-consecutive games of the second round. Cleveland lifted this restriction from the semifinals on, and Choo started as an outfielder in the semifinal match against Venezuela. He helped South Korea win 10–2 against Venezuela with a three-run home run against Carlos Silva in the first inning. He also contributed a solo home run in the fifth inning in the finals against Hisashi Iwakuma of Japan, where South Korea lost to Japan 5–3.

== Personal life ==
Choo and his wife Won-mi Ha have two sons (b. 2004 and 2010) and a daughter (b. 2011). While playing as a minor leaguer in the U.S. and making just $350 a week, Choo would skip meals to save money to buy diapers for his son. Choo is the nephew of Park Jeong-Tae, a former second baseman for the Lotte Giants. Choo has been a close friend of Lee Dae-Ho, former infielder with the Seattle Mariners organization, since attending the same elementary school together.

In the early morning of Monday, May 2, 2011, Choo was arrested and charged with drunk driving in Sheffield Lake, Ohio. He was pulled over by police around 2:25 a.m. because his vehicle was weaving, and Choo's blood alcohol content (via Breathalyzer test) was reportedly .20%, more than twice the legal limit. He apologized to his team and fans for this incident.

During the COVID-19 pandemic, Choo donated $1,000 to each of the 190 players in the Texas Rangers' minor league system who were unable to work due to MLB's shutdown. He also donated $200,000 to the nonprofit Community Chest of Korea to help the city of Daegu, which was the hardest hit city in Korea during the pandemic.

== In popular culture ==
- Choo has appeared in Running Man, with Hyun-jin Ryu on episode 119.
- Choo has appeared in 2 Days & 1 Night season 3, episodes 422–424, initially wanting to join the show as a short-term intern cast during his off-season. However, due to funding problems, the show's staffs had to eliminate him from being a continuous cast member.
- Choo as a character appeared in Reply 1997, on season 1, episode 8, depicting his days as a high school baseball player in Korea, played by Choo's actual younger brother, actor Min-ki Chu.

== Walk up songs ==
- Gangnam Style – Psy (April 2014)
- International Love – Pitbull (April 2014)
- Turn Down for What – DJ Snake & Lil Jon (April 2014)
- Regulate – Warren G (June 2016)
- Despacito – Remix by Luis Fonsi (July 2017)
- Fire – BTS (April 2018)

== See also ==
- List of Major League Baseball players who hit for the cycle

Achievements
Preceded by Brock Holt	Hitting for the cycle July 21, 2015	Succeeded by Adrián Beltré
