= Ryu Hee-woon =

South Korean baseball player

KT Wiz – No. 29
- Pitcher
- Born: June 19, 1995 (age 30); Cheonan, South Chungcheong, South Korea
- Bats: Right Throws: Right

KBO debut
- June 17, 2016, for the KT Wiz

KBO statistics (through May 25, 2019)
- Win–loss record: 5–6
- Earned run average: 7.23
- Strikeouts: 84

Teams
- KT Wiz (2016–present)

- Ryu Hee-woon
- Hangul: 류희운
- Hanja: 柳熙雲
- RR: Ryu Huiun
- MR: Ryu Hŭiun

Ryu Hee-woon (Korean: 류희운; born June 19, 1995) is the pitcher of KT Wiz of the KBO League. He joined KT Wiz in 2014. He graduated Bugil Academy. He was the national representative of the 26th World Youth Baseball Championships.

On June 14, 2017, he took the mound as a relief pitcher for Samsung Electronics and recorded his first win in his debut.
