= Chang Jong-hoon =

South Korean baseball player and coach

Hanwha Eagles – No. 35
- First baseman, Shortstop, Designated hitter / Coach
- Born: April 10, 1968 (age 58); Yeongdong, North Chungcheong
- Batted: Right Threw: Right

KBO debut
- April 14, 1987, for the Binggrae Eagles

Last KBO appearance
- September 15, 2005, for the Hanwha Eagles

Career statistics (through 2005)
- Batting average: .281
- Hits: 1,771
- Home runs: 340
- Run batted in: 1,145
- Stats at Baseball Reference

Teams
- As player: Binggrae Eagles / Hanwha Eagles (1986–2005); As coach: Hanwha Eagles (2006–2014); Lotte Giants (2015–2017); Hanwha Eagles (2018–2020)

Career highlights and awards
- Korean Series champion (1999); 2× KBO League MVP (1991–1992); 5x KBO League Golden Glove Award (1988, 1990–1992, 1995); 3x led KBO in home runs (1990–1992); 3x led KBO in RBI (1990–1992); 2x led KBO in runs (1991–1992); Led KBO in hits (1991); Led KBO in walks (1991); Hanwha Eagles #35 retired

- Chang Jong-hoon
- Hangul: 장종훈
- Hanja: 張鍾熏
- RR: Jang Jonghun
- MR: Chang Chonghun

Chang Jong-hoon (born April 10, 1968) is a retired former infielder in the KBO League. He spent his entire 20-year career with Binggrae/Hanwha Eagles. He is currently a coach with the team.

Chang was a two-time KBO MVP, and led the league in home runs and RBI three seasons in a row, from 1990 to 1992. He was the first player in the KBO League to reach 40 home runs in a season, the first to score 100 or more runs, and the first to drive in 100 or more runs. Chang was the KBO career Home Run King for ten years until being surpassed by Yang Joon-hyuk. Chang's 340 career home runs currently rank fourth on the KBO all-time list; his 1,145 RBI rank seventh.

== Career ==
Chang entered the league as a shortstop, winning the KBO League Golden Glove Award twice at that position, in 1988 and 1990. In 1990, he blasted 28 home runs and had 91 RBI.

Chang won the KBO League Most Valuable Player Award in both 1991 and 1992. In 1991 he hit .345 with 104 runs scored, 35 home runs, and 114 RBI to go along with an OPS of 1.090. He won the Golden Glove Award again, this time from the designated hitter position. That year he became the first KBO player to score 100 or more runs, as well as becoming the first player to drive in 100 or more runs. Switching to first base in 1992, he topped the previous year's numbers when he .299 with 41 home runs and 119 RBI and an OPS of 1.105, winning his fourth Golden Glove. That year he became the first KBO player to hit 40 or more home runs in a season.

Chang's final KBO Golden Glove Award came in 1995, when he hit .326 with 22 home runs and 78 RBI, with an OPS of .986.

Chang was part of the Eagles' so-called "Dynamite Bats" in the late 1990s to early 2000s, when the team was renowned for its overall slugging percentage, and won the franchise's only KBO championship (in 1999).

Chang hit his 253rd career home run on May 23, 1999, passing Lee Man-soo to become the all-time home run leader in the KBO. His total was later surpassed by Yang Joon-hyuk in 2009.

Chang's number 35 jersey was retired by the Eagles on September 16, 2005.

Immediately after his retirement as a player, Chang was hired as a coach for the Eagles, a position he held from 2006 to 2014. He moved to the Lotte Giants as a coach from 2015 to 2017. In 2018, Chang returned to the Eagles after being selected by manager Han Yong-duk to help rebuild the team.

== See also ==
- List of KBO career home run leaders
- List of KBO career RBI leaders
