= Wilmer Font =

Venezuelan baseball player (born 1990)

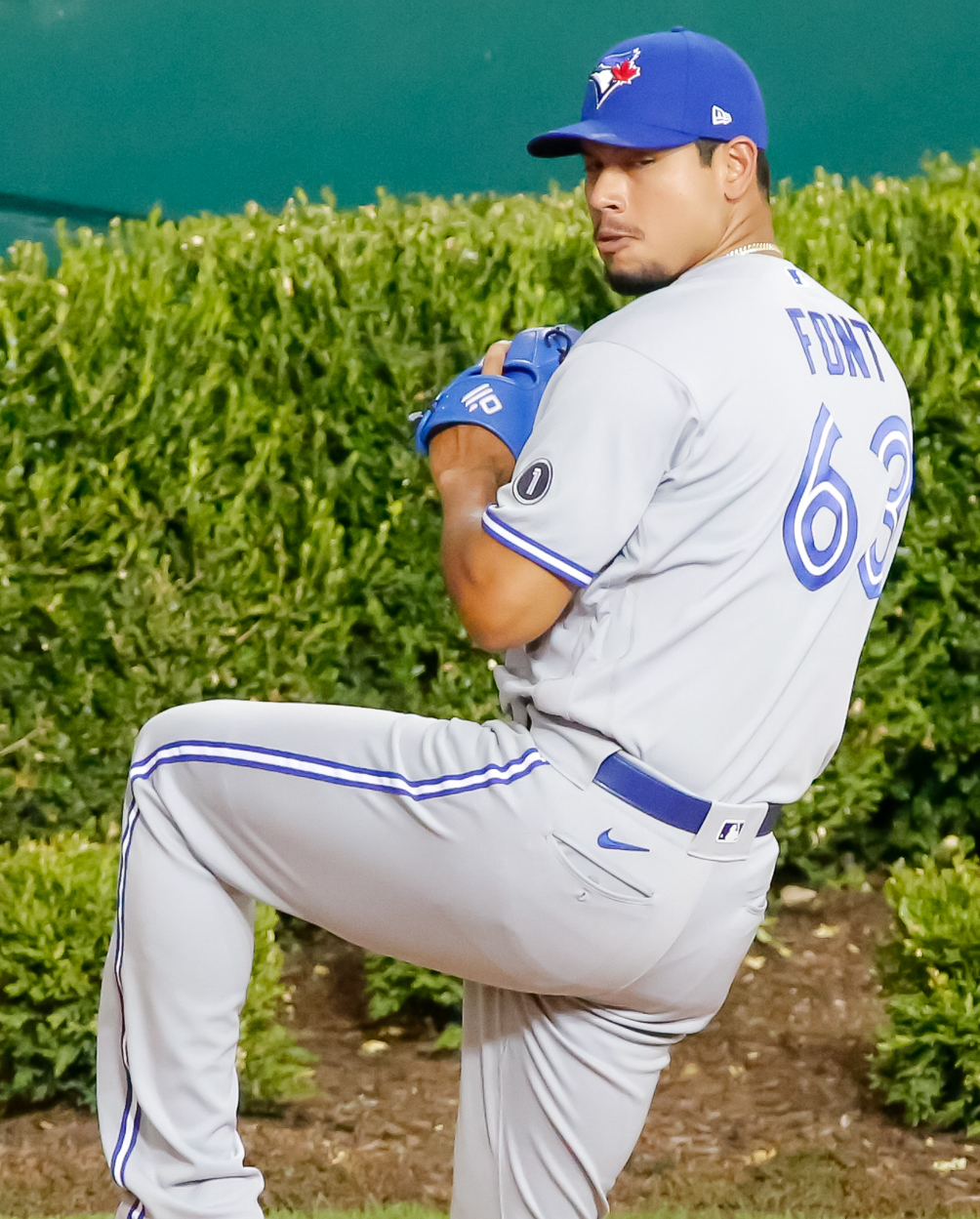
- Font with the Toronto Blue Jays in 2020

TSG Hawks – No. 80
- Pitcher
- Born: May 24, 1990 (age 36); La Guaira, Venezuela
- Bats: Right Throws: Right

Professional debut
- MLB: September 18, 2012, for the Texas Rangers
- KBO: April 7, 2021, for the SSG Landers
- CPBL: September 12, 2026, for the TSG Hawks

MLB statistics (through 2020 season)
- Win–loss record: 7–11
- Earned run average: 5.82
- Strikeouts: 150

KBO statistics (through 2022 season)
- Win–loss record: 21–11
- Earned run average: 3.03
- Strikeouts: 327

CPBL statistics (through September 24, 2026)
- Win–loss record: 2–1
- Earned run average: 3.71
- Strikeouts: 13
- Stats at Baseball Reference

Teams
- Texas Rangers (2012–2013); Los Angeles Dodgers (2017–2018); Oakland Athletics (2018); Tampa Bay Rays (2018–2019); New York Mets (2019); Toronto Blue Jays (2019–2020); SSG Landers (2021–2022); TSG Hawks (2026–present)

Career highlights and awards
- Korean Series champion (2022)

Wilmer Font Gómez (born May 24, 1990) is a Venezuelan professional baseball pitcher for the TSG Hawks of the Chinese Professional Baseball League (CPBL). He has previously played in Major League Baseball (MLB) for the Tampa Bay Rays, Texas Rangers, Los Angeles Dodgers, Oakland Athletics, New York Mets, and Toronto Blue Jays. He has also played in the KBO League for the SSG Landers.

== Professional career ==
=== Texas Rangers ===
The Texas Rangers signed Font as an international free agent on July 11, 2006. He began his professional career in 2007, playing for the Arizona League Rangers. That year, he went 2–3 with a 4.53 ERA in 14 games (10 starts), striking out 61 batters in 45 2/3 innings. In 2008, he again pitched for the AZL Rangers, going 1–0 with a 10.38 ERA in three starts, striking out six batters in 4 1/3 innings (that year he allowed only one hit and one walk, but he hit three batters).

In 2009, Font went 8–3 with a 3.49 ERA in 29 games (24 starts), striking out 105 batters in 108 1/3 innings for the Hickory Crawdads. He split 2010 between the Crawdads and Bakersfield Blaze, going 5–3 with a 4.35 ERA in 16 starts, striking out 85 batters in 78 2/3 innings. His 2010 season ended early when he came down with an elbow injury on July 7 which led to him undergoing Tommy John surgery after the season. He missed the entire 2011 season while recovering from the surgery. He returned in 2012 and pitched in 33 games (19 starts) primarily with the Myrtle Beach Pelicans and Frisco RoughRiders. He had a 4.03 ERA.

Font made his major league debut for the Rangers on September 18, 2012, pitching one scoreless inning of relief against the Los Angeles Angels of Anaheim. He pitched two innings over three games for the Rangers, allowing two earned runs and striking out one batter. His first MLB strikeout was against Mike Trout of the Angels on September 28.

Font spent most of the 2013 season in the minors, pitching in 26 games for Frisco and 16 for the Round Rock Express. In 42 games, he had a 1.90 ERA. He also pitched in two games in the majors for the Rangers in July, and did not allow a run in 1 1/3 innings. He spent the entire 2014 season with Frisco and was 1–2 with a 3.48 ERA in 29 games. Font was designated for assignment on October 2, 2014. He cleared waivers and was sent outright to Round Rock on October 6.

=== Ottawa Champions ===
Font signed with the Cincinnati Reds in the offseason, but was released on March 31, 2015. He then signed with the Ottawa Champions of the Canadian American Association of Professional Baseball for the 2015 season. He made 20 starts for the Champions and was 10–4 with a 4.09 ERA. He returned to Ottawa to start the 2016 season and began 2–2 with a 4.18 ERA in 10 games (9 starts).

=== Toronto Blue Jays ===
On July 4, 2016, Font's contract was purchased by the Toronto Blue Jays organization. He pitched in 12 games (11 starts) split between the Double–A New Hampshire Fisher Cats and Triple–A Buffalo Bisons, compiling a 4–4 record and 3.68 ERA with 55 strikeouts over 66 innings of work. Font elected free agency following the season on November 7.

=== Los Angeles Dodgers ===
Font signed a minor league contract with the Los Angeles Dodgers in December 2016. He was assigned to the Triple-A Oklahoma City Dodgers to begin the season and was selected as the starting pitcher for the Pacific Coast League mid-season all-star team. Font started 25 games for Oklahoma City in 2017 and was 10–8 with a 3.42 ERA and 178 strikeouts, setting a new team franchise record and winning him the Pacific Coast League Pitcher of the Year Award.

Font was promoted to the majors with the Dodgers on September 2. He appeared in just three games for the Dodgers, allowing seven runs in just 3 2/3 innings of work with three strikeouts and four walks. He began 2018 in the Dodgers bullpen and allowed 13 runs and 18 hits in 10 1/3 innings over six games, including picking up the loss in two extra inning games. On April 23, he was designated for assignment and removed from the active roster.

=== Oakland Athletics ===
On April 25, 2018, the Dodgers traded Font to the Oakland Athletics in exchange for minor leaguer Logan Salow. He posted an ERA of 14.85 in 4 appearances before being designated for assignment on May 23.

=== Tampa Bay Rays ===
On May 25, 2018, the Athletics traded Font to the Tampa Bay Rays in exchange for minor league pitcher Peter Bayer. Font found immediate success with the Rays posting a 1.67 ERA in 9 games (4 starts) over 27 innings before being placed on the 60-day disabled list with a right lat strain.

=== New York Mets ===
On May 6, 2019, the Rays traded Font to the New York Mets for cash considerations or a player to be named later. On July 12, Font was designated for assignment. In 15 appearances (3 starts), Font was 1–2 with 24 strikeouts in 31 innings.

=== Toronto Blue Jays (second stint) ===
On July 17, 2019, Font was traded to the Toronto Blue Jays in exchange for cash considerations. Font was used as an opener upon being acquired from the Mets. He appeared in 23 games (14 starts), striking out 53 in 39 1/3 innings. With the 2020 Toronto Blue Jays, Font appeared in 21 games, compiling a 1–3 record with 9.92 ERA and 15 strikeouts in 16.1 innings pitched. On September 24, 2020, Font was designated for assignment. He was outrighted on September 28. Font rejected the outright assignment and elected free agency the next day.

=== SSG Landers ===
On October 31, 2020, Font signed a one-year, $1 million deal with the SK Wyverns of the KBO League. The Wyverns rebranded as the SSG Landers in the offseason. Font posted an 8–5 record with a 3.46 ERA and 157 strikeouts over 25 starts. On December 17, 2021.

Font re-signed with the Landers for the 2022 season on a one-year, $1.5 million deal. In his season debut for the Landers, Font tossed 9.0 perfect innings against the NC Dinos, but was not credited with a perfect game as he was replaced by reliever Kim Taek-hyeong in the bottom of the 10th inning in the 4–0 victory. He became a free agent following the 2022 season.

=== San Diego Padres ===
On January 5, 2023, Font signed a minor league contract with the San Diego Padres. Font did not make an appearance for the Padres organization and elected free agency following the season on November 6.

=== Diablos Rojos del México ===
On December 21, 2023, Font signed with the Diablos Rojos del México of the Mexican League. He was released on June 24, 2024, without appearing in a game. However, Font was re-signed on July 31 and subsequently placed on the reserve list, where he spent the rest of the season and did not appear in a game.

Font made 13 appearances (12 starts) for the Diablos during the 2025 season, registering a 4–1 record and 6.65 ERA with 46 strikeouts across 44 2/3 innings pitched. With the team, he won his second consecutive Serie del Rey.

On February 6, 2026, Font was released by the Diablos.

=== Saraperos de Saltillo ===
On April 20, 2026, Font signed with the Saraperos de Saltillo of the Mexican League. Font made 19 starts for the Saraperos, compiling an 8–4 record and 4.91 ERA with 100 strikeouts over 88 innings of work.

=== TSG Hawks ===
On August 21, 2026, Font signed with the TSG Hawks of the Chinese Professional Baseball League.

== See also ==
- List of Major League Baseball players from Venezuela
