= Kim Do-hyeon =

Kim Do-hyeon may refer to:

- Kim Do-hyeon, better known by his alias Pine (gamer), South Korean Overwatch player
- Kim Do-hyeon (baseball), South Korean baseball player
