= Hanwha Solutions =

Corporation in Seoul, South Korea

Hanwha Solutions Corporation
- Native name: 한화솔루션
- Type: Public
- Traded as: KRX: 009830
- Founded: 1965; 61 years ago
- Headquarters: Seoul, South Korea
- Revenue: ₩13.28 trillion (2023)
- Operating income: ₩604.5 billion (2023)
- Net income: ₩-155.2 billion (2023)
- Total assets: ₩24.49 trillion (2023)
- Total equity: ₩9.01 trillion (2023)
- Number of employees: 6,004 (2023)
- Parent: Hanwha Group
- Divisions: Chemical; Insight; Qcells; Q Energy
- Website: hanwhasolutions.com/en

Hanwha Solutions Corporation (Korean: 한화솔루션) is a multinational energy services, petrochemical, and real estate development company headquartered in Seoul, South Korea. The company is part of the Hanwha Group, a large South Korean business conglomerate. Founded in 1965 as Hanwha Chemical, the company was rebranded as Hanwha Solutions in January 2020 when Hanwha Chemical merged with Hanwha Q Cells & Advanced Materials, which itself was formed out of a 2018 merger. The company added the Hanwha Galleria and Hanwha City Development real estate companies to its portfolio in April 2021. The Galleria division and the Advanced Materials division were spun off. The Electronic Materials business, which had remained part of the Advanced Materials division, was also transferred to a subsidiary of the company.

== Businesses ==
The company operates its business through four divisions:

- Chemical: Produces petrochemical products such as polyolefin (PO, includes polyethylene and polypropylene), polyvinyl chloride (PVC) and toluene diisocyanate (TDI, used in polyurethane), also produces chlorine and sodium hydroxide using the chloralkali process.
- Insight: A newly established division that combines Energy Solution Business Unit, Premium Lifestyle Business Unit and City Development Business Unit. It is primarily a real estate developer that specializes in industrial complexes.
- Qcells: Produces photovoltaic cells and modules, builds solar power plants, operates electricity retailing and conducts other related services.
- Q ENERGY: Targets Europe’s renewables market, including onshore and offshore wind, energy storage and PV parks.

== Products ==
Photovoltaic components

In September 2019, Q CELLS introduced its latest module called Q.PEAK DUO-G9. It combines existing half-cell Q.ANTUM DUO technology with Zero-gap feature, which removes spaces between cells to increase deployment capacity. It launched a consortium with the academics and private entities to develop next-generation tandem cell technology using perovskite.

Its Green Energy Solutions division manages the downstream business. In March 2021,Q CELLS sold an 81-megawatt solar power plant in Texas to US-based solar energy solutions provider Adapture Renewables Inc. The Rippey Solar Project plant is capable of producing electricity for 115,000 people per year.

With Distributed Energy Solutions division, Q CELLS operates an energy retail business in countries like Japan and Germany, where it supplies green electricity from 100 percent renewable sources to households and small-sized companies.

In December 2020, the company raised 1.2 trillion won through rights offerings in an effort to accelerate its expansion into renewable energy. In April 2021, The company issued its first overseas green bonds worth 1 billion yuan.

Petrochemical products

Chemical Division produced PVC (polyvinyl chloride) for the first time in South Korea. Including PVC, It also manufacturers other petrochemical products such as LDPE (low-density polyethylene), LLDPE (linear low-density polyethylene), CA (caustic soda), and TDI (Toluene Diisocyanate).

LDPE is a polymer used in a wide variety of applications from daily consumer goods to high-tech industrial materials. In 1972, Hanwha Solutions succeeded in producing LDPE for the first time in South Korea, and are now producing wire and cable compounds, adhesives for hygiene products, and hydrogenated hydrocarbon resins.

PVC is a general-purpose plastic widely used for applications such as synthetic leather, packaging, flooring, toys, and textiles. In 1966, Hanwha Chemical became the first company in South Korea to produce PVC. Now it focuses on manufacturing eco-friendly plasticizers developed by its own proprietary technology—such as ECO-DEHCH.

CA is an inorganic chemical product represented by caustic soda. It is used in various fields such as inorganic chemical products, paper, textiles, metals, electricity and electronics. TDI is commonly used across a wide array of industries and in everyday life, such as polyurethane foam and paint adhesives.

== Acquisitions and investments ==
RES France

In August 2021, the company acquired a French renewable development company owned by Renewable Energy System, or RES Group, as a part of its efforts to expand green energy business throughout Europe. The acquisition doubles its clean energy project pipeline in Europe to about 10 gigawatts and add wind projects to its portfolio for the first time.

REC Silicon

In November 2021, the company made a strategic investment in polysilicon manufacturer REC Silicon ASA (“REC Silicon”) to secure low-carbon photovoltaic materials in the US. It pledged to make further investments throughout the solar value chain there, once Congress passes the Solar Energy Manufacturing Act (SEMA) before year’s end.

Lancium Technologies

In November 2021, the company invested $100 million in Lancium Technologies, a Texas-based technology startup providing renewable-based electricity management service for energy-heavy devices. Established by Michael McNamara in 2017, the startup has secured 150 million through funding from investing firms focusing on energy sectors.

== Green hydrogen ==
In December 2020, Hanwha Solutions pledged to build a green hydrogen plant in PyeongChang, Gangwon Province, as a part of its plan to create an ecosystem for the cleanest form of energy. Starting from late 2022, the plant aims to produce 290 tons of green hydrogen every year.

Besides building a hydrogen manufacturing complex, the company also aims to develop advanced technology for hydrogen storage. In December 2020, it acquired US high-pressure tank maker Cimarron Composites and planned to invest $100 million through 2025.

The company also seeks to enhance green hydrogen production capability with advanced electrolyte technology.

== See also ==
- renewable energy
- photovoltaic
- green hydrogen
- Economy of South Korea
- Hanwha
