= Jang Si-hwan =

South Korean baseball player

LG Twins
- Pitcher
- Born: November 1, 1987 (age 38); Taean, South Chungcheong
- Bats: Right Throws: Right

KBO debut
- 2007, for the Hyundai Unicorns

KBO statistics (through 2025)
- Win–loss record: 29–74
- Earned run average: 5.31
- Strikeouts: 695
- Holds: 35
- Saves: 34
- Stats at Baseball Reference

Teams
- Hyundai Unicorns (2007); Woori / Nexen Heroes (2008–2009, 2011–2014); KT Wiz (2015–2017); Lotte Giants (2017–2019); Hanwha Eagles (2020–2025); LG Twins (2026–present)

- Jang Si-hwan
- Hangul: 장시환
- Hanja: 張施晥
- RR: Jang Sihwan
- MR: Chang Sihwan

Former name
- Hangul: 장효훈
- Hanja: 張孝訓
- RR: Jang Hyohun
- MR: Chang Hyohun

Jang Si-hwan (born November 1, 1987) is a South Korean professional baseball pitcher for the Hanwha Eagles of the KBO League. He has also played for the Hyundai Unicorns, the Nexen Heroes, and the Lotte Giants.

On November 21, 2019, he and Kim Hyun-woo, who were then members of the Lotte Giants, and Kim Joo-hyun and Ji Sung-joon, who were members of the Hanwha Eagles, moved to a 2:2 trade.
