= An Young-myung =

South Korean baseball player and coach

Hanwha Eagles
- Pitcher / Coach
- Born: November 19, 1984 (age 41); Cheonan, South Chungcheong
- Bats: Right Throws: Right

KBO debut
- May 13, 2003, for the Hanwha Eagles

KBO statistics (through 2022 season)
- Win–loss record: 61–53
- Earned run average: 4.88
- Strikeouts: 673
- Stats at Baseball Reference

Teams
- As player: Hanwha Eagles (2003-2010); Kia Tigers (2010); Hanwha Eagles (2011, 2014-2020); KT Wiz (2021-2022); As coach: KT Wiz (2023-2026); Hanwha Eagles (2027-present)

- An Young-myung
- Hangul: 안영명
- Hanja: 安永命
- RR: An Yeongmyeong
- MR: An Yŏngmyŏng

An Young-myung (Korean: 안영명; Hanja: 安永命; born November 19, 1984) is a South Korean former professional baseball starting pitcher.
