= Kim Kang-min (baseball) =

South Korean baseball player and coach

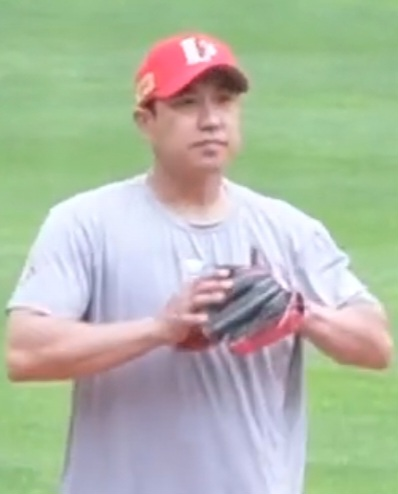
- Kim Kang-min with the SSG Landers

NC Dinos
- Outfielder / Coach
- Born: September 13, 1982 (age 44); Daegu, South Korea
- Batted: Right Threw: Right

KBO debut
- July 21, 2002, for the SK Wyverns

Last KBO appearance
- July 17, 2024, for the Hanwha Eagles

KBO statistics
- Batting average: .273
- Hits: 1,487
- Home runs: 139
- Runs batted in: 681
- Stolen bases: 209
- Stats at Baseball Reference

Teams
- As player: SK Wyverns / SSG Landers (2002–2023); Hanwha Eagles (2024); SSG Landers (2025); As coach: NC Dinos (2027–present); Others: MBC Sports+ Baseball Commentator (2025–2026); KBO Power Enhancement Committee Member (2025–2026)

Career highlights and awards
- 2022 Korean Series MVP; KBO Golden Glove (2010); 5× KBO All-Star (2010, 2012, 2014-2015, 2019); 5× Korean Series champion (2007-2008, 2010, 2018, 2022)
Medals
Asian Games
Gold medal – first place	2010 Guangzhou	Team

- Kim Kang-min
- Hangul: 김강민
- Hanja: 金江珉
- RR: Gim Gangmin
- MR: Kim Kangmin

Kim Kang-min (Korean: 김강민; Hanja: 金江珉; Korean pronunciation: [ȴu.çʌndʑin]; born September 13, 1982) is a former South Korean outfielder who played for the SSG Landers(formerly the SK Wyverns), and Hanwha Eagles in the KBO League.

== Professional career ==
=== Awards and honors ===
- 2010 Golden Glove Award (outfielder)
