= Jung Min-cheul =

South Korean baseball player and manager

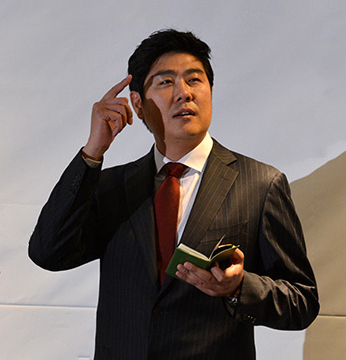
- Jung Min-Chul, 2015

Hanwha Eagles – No. 23
- Pitcher
- Born: March 28, 1972 (age 54); Daejeon, South Korea
- Batted: Right Threw: Right

Professional debut
- KBO: April 5, 1992, for the Binggrae Eagles
- NPB: 2000, for the Yomiuri Giants

Last appearance
- NPB: 2001, for the Yomiuri Giants
- KBO: September 12, 2009, for the Hanwha Eagles

KBO statistics
- Win–loss record: 161−128
- Earned run average: 3.51
- Strikeouts: 1,661

NPB statistics
- Win–loss record: 3–2
- Earned run average: 4.70
- Strikeouts: 44
- Stats at Baseball Reference

Teams
- As player: Binggrae Eagles/Hanwha Eagles (1992–1999); Yomiuri Giants (2000–2001); Hanwha Eagles (2002–2009); As coach: Hanwha Eagles player coach (2009); Hanwha Eagles pitching coach (2010–2014); South Korea national baseball team pitching coach (2017–2019)

Career highlights and awards
- KBO: 2x strikeout leader (1994, 1997); ERA leader (1994); No-hitter (1997); 3x All-Star (1995, 1999, 2007); Korean Series champion (1999)

- Jung Min-cheul
- Hangul: 정민철
- Hanja: 鄭珉哲
- RR: Jeong Mincheol
- MR: Chŏng Minch'ŏl

Jung Min-cheul (Korean: 정민철; born March 28, 1972) is a South Korean former professional baseball pitcher and coach, who is currently the General Manager of the Hanwha Eagles. He played 16 seasons in the KBO League for the Binggrae/Hanwha Eagles, and two seasons in Nippon Professional Baseball for the Yomiuri Giants. He is second all-time in the KBO League in wins and fourth in career strikeouts. Jung won at least ten games for eight straight seasons, from 1992 through 1999.

Jung debuted in the KBO League in 1992, right out of Daejeon High School, winning 14 games to go with a 2.48 earned run average, second in the league among qualified candidates. His 145 strikeouts was also the second-highest total in the league. Jung was stellar in 1994, as his 2.15 ERA led the league among qualified candidates, and he topped the KBO in strikeouts in with 196. He was second in the league in strikeouts in 1996, with 203 (the only season in which he topped 200 strikeouts). Jung again led the league in strikeouts in 1997 with 160. In May of that year, Jung became only the ninth pitcher in the history of the KBO to pitch a no-hitter.

Jung was the ace of the 1999 Korean Series-winning Eagles' pitching staff, going 18–8 with a 3.75 ERA and 151 strikeouts.

Jung left the Eagles for the NPB's Yomiuri Giants in 2000–2001, but he didn't find the success in that league that he did in the KBO, compiling a 3–2 record and a 4.70 ERA in limited action.

Returning to the Eagles in 2002, Jung pitched for nine more seasons, racking up 53 more wins. His final season, 2009, was spent as a player-coach. Jung's #23 jersey was retired by the Hanwha Eagles on September 11, 2009.

Jung's 161 career victories are second in the KBO only to his long-time Eagles teammate Song Jin-woo.

Jung served as the Eagles' pitching coach in 2010–2014.

He was an MBC Sports+ baseball commentator from 2015 to 2019, while also serving as the pitching coach of the South Korean national baseball team from 2017 to 2019.

In October 2019, Jung moved into the front office as the Eagles' general manager.

== See also ==
- List of KBO career strikeout leaders
- List of KBO career win leaders
