= Bugil High School =

School in Cheonan, South Korea

Coordinates: 36.8310848°N 127.1584515°E

Bugil Academy
- 북일고등학교
- Cheonan; South Korea

Information
- Type: Private, Boarding
- Established: 1975
- Founder: Kim Chong-hee
- Website: www.bugil.hs.kr/eng/index/

- Bugil High School
- Hangul: 북일고등학교
- Hanja: 北一高等學校
- RR: Bugil godeunghakgyo
- MR: Pugil kodŭnghakkyo

Bugil Academy (Korean: 북일고등학교; Hanja: 北一高等學校) is a private, independent boarding school located in Cheonan, South Korea.

Bugil Academy (Bugil High School) is one of the most selective and prestigious boarding schools in Korea, renowned for its high academic levels and successful college admission results. Bugil Academy selects half of the students per grade nationwide, and its admissions process is competitive. The school requires prospective students to show academic well-roundedness and other various qualities.

Established in 1975, the school is financed by the Hanwha Group, one of the largest chaebol in Korea.

== Traditions ==
=== Cherry Blossom Festival ===
Bugil Academy is famous for its cherry blossoms that fill the wide campus every spring. Its reputation has even led the Korean indie band Busker Busker to write a popular song "Cherry Blossom Ending". The Cherry Blossom festival is held usually in mid-April when blossoms reach their peak. Since 1976, it has grown to become a festival for the entire Cheonan city and annually attracts hundreds of visitors. The festival is even more famous for the fireworks on the last night. In 2010, the school spent nearly $300,000 on fireworks for commemorating the 25th anniversary of the school's establishment. Unlike what many think, the school's official flower is not cherry blossom but Korean Forsythia.

=== Strict discipline ===
Strict discipline defines the educational style of Bugil Academy. It is based on strong military-style traditions that includes military salute and trainings. As a result, the school is often criticized for being overly stringent, conservative and anachronistic. Whether this discipline helped or not, Bugil Academy has had the highest number of students accepted to Korea Military Academy, Korea Naval Academy and Korea Air Force Academy for many years.

=== Baseball ===
Bugil's baseball team is one of the strongest teams in the Korean High Schools' League. Closely related to the professional KBO League team Hanhwa Eagles, it has achieved notable successes in a wide variety of competitions. Since 1978, it has won 23 championships 15 runners-up and 21 third-bests. Some of the respected players who graduated from Bugil Academy are Kim Tae-kyun, Yoon Hyung-bae and Na Ju-hwan.

== Global Leader Program ==
Bugil Academy's Global Leader Program (GLP) is a "school within a school". The GLP comprises students in the three grades (10–12) of class #12 – students from classes #1~#11 are separate and belong to the Boys' School. Only the GLP is co-educational and has its own specialized American curriculum, whereas classes #1~#11 form the all-boys school and follow the Korean curriculum. GLP's structure and curriculum are completely different from the rest of the Bugil Academy. Much more selective and specialized, the GLP currently has a maximum enrollment of 90 students: 30 seniors, 30 juniors and 30 sophomores.

Despite the overwhelming success of the program in placing students in top-tier American and British universities, the program is to be closed after the 2020 school year (ending in January 2021) due to a discontinuation of funding from the Hanhwa Corp..

=== Academics ===
Featuring a challenging Advanced Placement-oriented curriculum taught in English-only classes, the GLP provides preparation for Korean students to primarily top-tier universities in the United States and the United Kingdom, but also Japan and Hong Kong. The school intends its students to develop their own unique color and character through their experiences at Bugil Academy which will help them to stand out among the increasing number of Korean applicants. Each student takes seven courses including a Directed Research Project (DRP), an individualized, independent graduation research project on his or her topic of interest. The GLP has a 6:1 student-teacher ratio, and each student is assigned one teacher as his or her mentor, thus helping new incoming students to seamlessly assimilate into the school community. The school believes that its academic environment enhances time management skills, diligence, and self-reliance. Since its opening, the GLP has had faculty members with diverse nationalities including the United States, Ecuador, Switzerland, and China. The AP average for 2015 was the highest in school history: 4.6.

=== Exchange programs ===
Bugil Academy GLP participates in numerous exchange programs with many different schools worldwide. Schools involved in the exchange program with Bugil include Hwa Chong Institution in Singapore, Westlake High School (Texas) and Townview Magnet Center. The GLP students are also annually invited to several international events such as Asia-Pacific Youth Leaders' Summit (APYLS) by Hwa Chong Institution, Dominion International Young Leaders' Summit (DIYLS) by Dominion High School and International Young Leaders' Forum (IYLF). Through the international conference experiences, students learn to thrive in foreign environments amongst students who come from diverse backgrounds.

=== Residential life ===
All GLP students must reside in the school dormitory for all three years. Constructed in 1976 and renovated in 2009, Summit Hall has six classrooms, one library with 9,000 volumes (the biggest English library for secondary schools in Korea), student activity room, and a music room. The dormitory for male students is located next to the front gate. Female students share the dormitory building with the Bugil Girls' High School. Both dormitories have dorm parents who inspect students on a regular basis; all students wake up at 7:00 a.m. and attend classes until 4:20 p.m. Mandatory study hours are from 7:10 p.m. to 11:30 pm., and from then to 1:30 a.m., students are free to do independent study and work on individual homework, team projects, or any academic activity that suits their needs and interests.

=== Extracurricular ===
The GLP has its own extracurricular programs separate from the rest of Bugil Academy. It has a student-run weekly newspaper The Headline, which publishes weekly editions to update the school community regarding ongoing events. It also has activities with respect to public speaking, debate, Model United Nations, and stage performance. Many of the students have exhibited great achievements in competitions such as World Individual Debating and Public Speaking Championships, National Forensic League and several Model Congress and Model United Nations conferences. In terms of sports, the newly formed lacrosse team has grown quickly to win a championship in the sophomore division of the National tournament. Some other unique extracurricular includes the volunteering club Interact and Three Cups of Tea, a club for tea mania to socialize and discuss.

=== College entrance ===
In February 2013, the GLP's first graduates attended their graduation ceremony. 23 graduates were accepted to top-tier schools in the United States, France, and Japan. Since then, the GLP has continuously placed most of its students at elite U.S., U.K., and Korean universities.

=== School closing ===
The GLP admitted its final class of students in March 2010. This class will graduate after the 2020 school year, which ends in January 2021. The program will then shut down as the Hanhwa Group will no longer fund the GLP.
