= Han Yong-duk =

South Korean baseball player (born 1965)

- Pitcher / Manager
- Born: June 2, 1965 (age 61); Daegu
- Batted: Right Threw: Right

KBO debut
- July 1, 1988, for the Binggrae Eagles

Last appearance
- April 27, 2004, for the Hanwha Eagles

KBO statistics
- Win–loss record: 120–118
- Earned run average: 3.54
- Strikeouts: 1,344
- Stats at Baseball Reference

Teams
- As player: Binggrae Eagles (1988–1993); Hanwha Eagles (1994–2004); As coach: Hanwha Eagles (2006–2012); Doosan Bears (2015–2017); As manager: Hanwha Eagles (2018–2020)

- Han Yong-duk
- Hangul: 한용덕
- Hanja: 韓容悳
- RR: Han Yongdeok
- MR: Han Yongdŏk

Han Yong-duk (Korean: 한용덕; born June 2, 1965) is a South Korean former professional baseball player and former manager of the Hanwha Eagles of the KBO League. Han was signed to a three-year contract in October 2017 to become Eagle's 11th manager. On June 7, 2020, he resigned from his position after the Eagles' 14th consecutive loss of the season to tie the franchise's longest losing streak.

Preceded by Kim Sung-keun	Hanwha Eagles Manager; 2018–2020	Succeeded by Choi Won-ho
