= Cheongju Baseball Stadium =

Baseball stadium in Cheongju

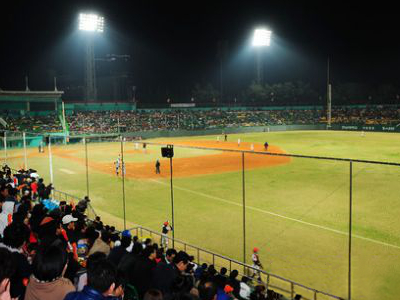
- Interactive map of Cheongju Baseball Stadium
- Location: Cheongju, South Korea
- Coordinates: 36°38′19″N 127°28′12″E
- Owner: Cheongju City
- Operator: Cheongju City / Hanwha Eagles
- Capacity: 10,500
- Surface: Artificial turf
- Field size: Left Field Line – 100 m (328 ft); Center Field – 115 m (377 ft); Right Field Line – 100 m (328 ft)

Construction
- Opened: May 1979

Tenants
- OB Bears (1982–1984); Hanwha Eagles (1986–present)

Cheongju Baseball Stadium (Korean: 청주야구장) is a baseball park in Cheongju, South Korea. The stadium serves as a secondary home of the Hanwha Eagles. It is commonly known as Eagles' Park.
