= Hanwha Group =

South Korean conglomerate

- Native name: 주식회사 한화
- Formerly: Korea Explosives Group
- Type: Public
- Traded as: KRX: 000880
- Industry: Conglomerate
- Founded: October 1952; 74 years ago
- Founder: Kim Chong-hee
- Headquarters: 86, Cheonggyecheon-ro, Jung-gu, Seoul, South Korea
- Area served: Worldwide
- Key people: Kim Seung-youn (chairman)
- Revenue: ▲ ₩62.2784 trillion (2022)
- Operating income: ▼ ₩2.5161 trillion (2022)
- Net income: ▼ ₩2.2433 trillion (2022)
- Total assets: ▲ ₩211.1753 trillion (2022)
- Total equity: ▼ ₩20.8788 trillion (2022)
- Owner: National Pension Service (7.61%); Korea Zinc (7.25%); Treasury stocks (1.51%); Other (0.6%)
- Number of employees: 43,690 (2020)
- Website: Official website in English; Official website in Korean

- Hanwha Group
- Hangul: 한화 그룹
- Hanja: 韓火그룹
- RR: Hanhwa geurup
- MR: Hanhwa kŭrup

Hanwha Group (Korean: 한화그룹) is a South Korean business conglomerate (chaebol). Founded in 1952 as Korea Explosives Co. (한국화약주식회사; 韓國火藥株式會社), the group has grown into a large multi-profile business conglomerate, with diversified holdings stretching from explosives—their original business—to energy, materials, aerospace, mechatronics, finance, retail, and lifestyle services. In 1992, the company adopted its abbreviation as its new name: "Hanwha".

== History ==
=== 1952–1999 ===
Kim Chong-hee founded Korea Explosives Co. in October 1952. Prior to founding the company, Kim worked as a gunpowder engineer for the "Chosun Explosives Factory", a Japanese company. Later, he won the bid for the company and its Incheon factory and started the company there.

From 1952 to 1963, the Korea Explosives Co. produced industrial explosives domestically, which was needed for construction and engineering of infrastructure. In the same time period, the Korea Explosives Co. started producing nitroglycerin, which gave it a monopoly in the field of explosives and gunpowder. In 1959, the Hanwha group started producing domestic dynamite.

From 1964 to 1980 the Hanwha group started to make investments in various fields, starting the foundation of it becoming a chaebol. Later in the mid-1960s, Korea Hwasung industrial Co. was founded (now Hanwha Solutions), and entered the petrochemical market. Hanwha increased its competitiveness in the machinery market by acquiring Shinhan Bearing Industrial. Hanwha founded Kyung-in Energy in 1969, and the Hankook Precision Tools (now Hanwha Corporation/Momentum) followed suit, being founded in 1971.

From 1981 to 1995, Kim Seung-youn became the second chairman of the company, and more investments in diverse markets were initiated. It expanded further into the chemical industry by acquiring both Hanyang Chemicals (now also Hanwha Solutions) and Dow Chemicals Korea in 1982, expanded into the resorts industry by acquiring the Junga group (now Hanwha Hotels & Resorts) in 1985, and expanded into the leisure and distribution industry by acquiring Hanyang Stores (now Hanwha Galleria) in 1986. In the 1990s, the Hanwha Group founded Hanwha BASF Urethane, Hanwha NSK Precision, Hanwha GKN, Hanwha Machinery Hub Eye Bearings, SKF Hanwha Auto Parts, and Hanwha Motors. In 1992, the Korea Explosives Co. changed its name to Hanwha, and Binggrae was separated and made independent from the company.

=== 2000 to present ===
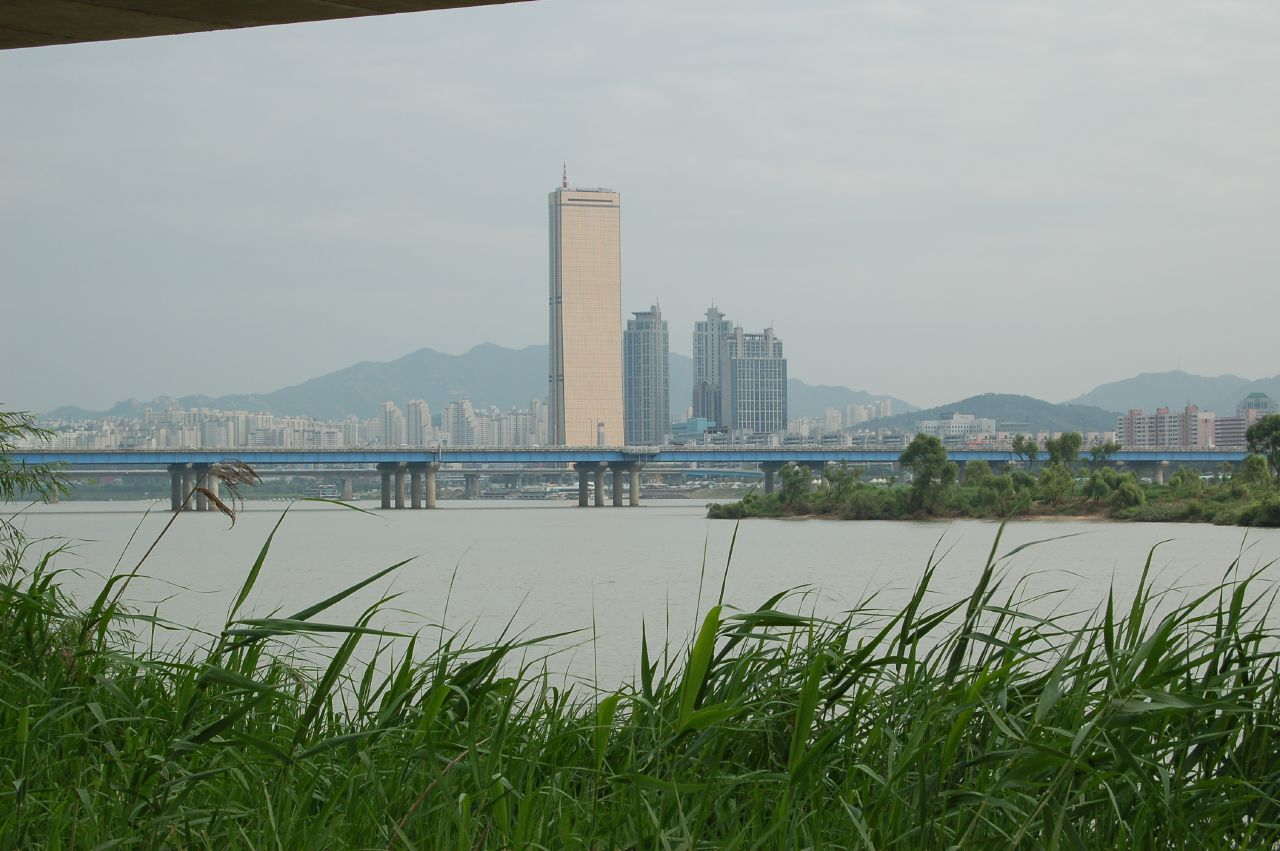
Hanwha 63 City building in Yeouido, Seoul

In 2002, Hanwha expanded into the life insurance industry by acquiring Korea Life Insurance. From 2007–present, Hanwha is undergoing global expansion. Hanwha acquired Azdel, an American company in 2007 and established a PVC plant in Ningbo, Zhejiang, China in 2011. Hanwha Q CELLS was launched in 2012. In 2014, Hanwha acquired Samsung Techwin, Samsung Thales, and Samsung Total. Since 2019, Hanwha is operating the largest solar module plant (1.7 GW) in the United States; It is located in Dalton, Georgia. As of 2019, Hanwha has a total of 466 affiliates, 84 being domestic and 382 overseas. Hanwha completed its take over of Daewoo Shipbuilding & Marine Engineering (DSME), renaming it Hanwha Ocean in 2023.

In April 2026, Hanwha Group rose to fifth place among Korea’s business conglomerates.

==== Controversy ====
In 2011, Kim Seung-yeon, the current chairman of the Hanwha Group, was fined 5.1 billion KRW and was jailed for 4 years on charges of embezzlement and breach of trust.

== Key networks ==
- R&D: Germany, Malaysia, US, China, and South Korea
- Manufacturing: Germany, Czech Republic, Malaysia, China, South Korea, Iraq and US
- Marketing & Sales: Australia, Canada, Japan, US, China, South Korea, and Iraq

== Business areas ==
=== Energy & Materials ===
==== Solar Energy ====
In a meeting held on May 21, 2022, Kim Dong-kwan, the president of Hanwha Solutions, laid down a plan to spend 36.7 trillion KRW on its energy and aerospace sectors. He said he wanted to commit the company to solar energy to reduce its carbon footprint and supply high quality energy. Additionally, he announced plans to build another modular factory in the United States. In order to tackle the problem of stagnating bee populations, Hanwha has created a solar beehive, that helps to protect and maintain a stable bee population. Hanwha QCELLS has launched a new brand that ventures into the electric vehicle charging market called Hanwha Motiev in 2022.

==== Wind Energy ====
Hanwha operates in the onshore and offshore wind power generation sectors, with a focus on Europe through its subsidiary Q Energy, as well as the domestic market.

==== Hydrogen ====
Hanwha develops a hydrogen value chain, which includes production, utilization, and storage services, utilizing renewable energy sources. Hanwha acquired Thomassen Energy/PSM in July 2021, which enables retrofitting of gas turbines for hydrogen use.

==== Materials ====
Hanwha Solutions produces basic petrochemical products, such as PVC (Polyvinyl Chloride), LLDPE (Linear Low-Density Polyethylene), CA (Caustic Soda), ASR (Alkali Water Soluble Resin), and TDI (Toluene Diisocyanate), as well as working on eco-friendly technologies including low-impact plasticizers.

=== Aerospace ===
==== Space ====
Hanwha is also extensively investing in the space market, and jointly established "Space Research Center" with KAIST. Hanwha Aerospace contributes to South Korea's space industry, including satellite observation services and the development of the Nuri space launch vehicle. Hanwha took an 8.8% stake in British company OneWeb, a satellite communication service provider as of 2022.

==== Aircraft Engine ====
Hanwha Aerospace is South Korea's sole aircraft engine producer, partnering with global aviation engine companies for component manufacturing.

==== Vision Solutions ====
Hanwha Vision (formerly Samsung Techwin, before getting acquired by Hanwha) delivers video surveillance services with a focus on optics design, image processing, and AI-based platforms to improve service offerings.

=== Finance ===
Hanwha operates in the financial industry, providing insurance, securities, and asset-management services, and investing in technology-based financial services.

=== Retail & Services ===
Hanwha engages in retail & services such as department stores, hotels, and resorts, as well as developing large-scale complexes.

== Affiliates ==
- Hanwha Group's business area has five types, defence, technologies, energy, finance, and service. On 23 May 2023, Hanwha acquires Daewoo Shipbuilding & Marine Engineering, and renamed Hanwha Ocean.

=== Aerospace·Defence·Maritime ===
- Hanwha Corporation (Holding company)
- Hanwha Aerospace
- Hanwha Ocean
- Hanwha Philly Shipyard (formerly Philadelphia Shipyard)
- Precision Machinery
- Hanwha Systems
- Hanwha Vision
- Hanwha Robotics

=== Energy ===
- Hanwha Advanced Materials
- Hanwha Energy
- Hanwha Impact
- Hanwha Power Systems
- Hanwha Qcells
- Hanwha Solutions
- Hanwha TotalEnergies Petrochemical
- Yeochun NCC

=== Construction ===
- Hanwha Corporation E&C Division

=== Finance ===
- Carrot Insurance
- Hanwha Asset Management
- Hanwha General Insurance
- Hanwha Investment & Securities
- Hanwha Life Insurance
- Hanwha Life Financial Service
- Hanwha Saving Bank

=== Distribution·Hospitality Service ===
- Hanwha Galleria
- Hanwha Hotels & Resorts
- Hanwha Foodtech
- Hanwha Connect

== Awards ==
- Old Tower Industrial Medal, November 1982
- $100 Million Export Tower Award, November 1982
- Silver Tower Industrial Medal and the $1 Billion Export Tower Award, November 1998
- Gold Tower Industrial Medal (45th Annual Trade Day Ceremony), December 2008
- $2 Billion Export Tower Award (45th Annual Trade Day Ceremony), December 2008

== Sports teams ==
- Hanwha Eagles
- Hanwha Life Esports

== See also ==
- List of Korean companies
- Economy of South Korea
- Aqua Planet (aquarium)
- Binggrae
