= 2022 KBO League season =

Professional baseball season in South Korea

2022 KBO League
- League: KBO League
- Sport: Baseball
- Duration: April 2 – October 11 (regular season)
- Number of games: 144 per team
- Number of teams: 10
- TV partner(s): KBS, MBC, SBS, SPOTV

Regular Season
- Season champions: SSG Landers
- Season MVP: Lee Jung-hoo (Kiwoom)

Postseason
- Wild Card champions: KT Wiz
- Wild Card runners-up: Kia Tigers
- Semi-playoffs champions: Kiwoom Heroes
- Semi-playoffs runners-up: KT Wiz
- Playoffs champions: Kiwoom Heroes
- Playoffs runners-up: LG Twins

Korean Series
- Champions: SSG Landers
- Runners-up: Kiwoom Heroes
- Finals MVP: Kim Kang-min

KBO League seasons
- ← 2021 2023 →

The 2022 KBO League season was the 41st season in the history of the KBO League. The regular season began on April 2 and ended on October 11. A postseason then followed, culminating with the championship Korean Series. KT Wiz entered the season as defending champions.

== Season format ==
No changes were made to the league's makeup from the prior season, with the same 10 teams competing. Each team is scheduled to play 144 games, via facing every other team 16 times.

The league announced some operational changes:

- If two teams are tied for the final playoff spot (5th place), the teams will play a single-game tiebreaker.
  - If more than two teams are tied for the final playoff spot, mathematical tiebreakers will be used.
- The number of replay review officials used by the league was increased from three to five (one per game).
- Games will only be canceled (such as due to COVID-19 effects) if a team is unable to dress 28 players.

Additionally, some temporary measures used during the prior season, such as not playing extra innings, were discontinued.

== Standings ==
Last updated October 12, 2022

Regular season standings
| Rank | Team | Record | | GB | Postseason |
| Rank | Team | Won–Lost (Win %) | Tied | GB | Postseason |
|---|---|---|---|---|---|
| 1 | SSG Landers | 88–52 (.629) | 4 | – | Korean Series |
| 2 | LG Twins | 87–55 (.613) | 2 | 2 | Playoff |
| 3 | Kiwoom Heroes | 80–62 (.563) | 2 | 9 | Semi-playoff |
| 4 | KT Wiz | 80–62 (.563) | 2 | 9 | Wildcard Game |
| 5 | Kia Tigers | 70–73 (.490) | 1 | 19½ | Wildcard Game |
| 6 | NC Dinos | 67–74 (.475) | 3 | 21½ | Did not qualify |
| 7 | Samsung Lions | 66–76 (.465) | 2 | 23 | Did not qualify |
| 8 | Lotte Giants | 64–76 (.457) | 4 | 24 | Did not qualify |
| 9 | Doosan Bears | 60–82 (.423) | 2 | 29 | Did not qualify |
| 10 | Hanwha Eagles | 46–96 (.324) | 2 | 43 | Did not qualify |

Note: Regular-season games are limited to 12 innings; tie results are ignored by the league when computing winning percentage and games behind.

== Postseason ==
Wild Card
4 | KT Wiz | 2
5 | Kia Tigers | 0

Semi-playoff
3 | Kiwoom Heroes | 3
4 | KT Wiz | 2

Playoff
2 | LG Twins | 1
3 | Kiwoom Heroes | 3

Korean Series
1 | SSG Landers | 4
3 | Kiwoom Heroes | 2

=== Wild Card ===
The series started with a 1–0 advantage for the fourth-placed team.

KT Wiz (2) vs. Kia Tigers (0)

| Game | Date | Score | Location | Time | Attendance |
|---|---|---|---|---|---|
| 1 | October 13 | Kia Tigers − 2, KT Wiz − 6 | Suwon Baseball Stadium | 3:02 | 17,600 |

=== Semi-playoff ===
Kiwoom Heroes (3) vs. KT Wiz (2)

| Game | Date | Score | Location | Time | Attendance |
|---|---|---|---|---|---|
| 1 | October 16 | KT Wiz – 4, Kiwoom Heroes – 8 | Gocheok Sky Dome | 3:12 | 15,018 |
| 2 | October 17 | KT Wiz – 2, Kiwoom Heroes – 0 | Gocheok Sky Dome | 2:39 | 9,282 |
| 3 | October 19 | Kiwoom Heroes – 9, KT Wiz – 2 | Suwon Baseball Stadium | 3:16 | 9,791 |
| 4 | October 20 | Kiwoom Heroes – 6, KT Wiz – 9 | Suwon Baseball Stadium | 3:35 | 8,464 |
| 5 | October 22 | KT Wiz – 3, Kiwoom Heroes – 4 | Gocheok Sky Dome | 2:58 | 13,028 |

=== Playoff ===
LG Twins (1) vs. Kiwoom Heroes (3)

| Game | Date | Score | Location | Time | Attendance |
|---|---|---|---|---|---|
| 1 | October 24 | Kiwoom Heroes – 3, LG Twins – 6 | Jamsil Baseball Stadium | 3:03 | 23,750 |
| 2 | October 25 | Kiwoom Heroes – 7, LG Twins – 6 | Jamsil Baseball Stadium | 4:19 | 23,750 |
| 3 | October 27 | LG Twins – 4, Kiwoom Heroes – 6 | Gocheok Sky Dome | 3:21 | 16,300 |
| 4 | October 28 | LG Twins – 1, Kiwoom Heroes – 4 | Gocheok Sky Dome | 3:15 | 16,300 |

=== Korean Series ===
SSG Landers (4) vs. Kiwoom Heroes (2)

| Game | Date | Score | Location | Time | Attendance |
|---|---|---|---|---|---|
| 1 | November 1 | Kiwoom Heroes – 7, SSG Landers – 6 | Incheon SSG Landers Field | 4:19 | 22,500 |
| 2 | November 2 | Kiwoom Heroes – 1, SSG Landers – 6 | Incheon SSG Landers Field | 3:09 | 22,500 |
| 3 | November 4 | SSG Landers – 8, Kiwoom Heroes – 2 | Gocheok Sky Dome | 3:50 | 16,300 |
| 4 | November 5 | SSG Landers – 3, Kiwoom Heroes – 6 | Gocheok Sky Dome | 3:39 | 16,300 |
| 5 | November 7 | Kiwoom Heroes – 4, SSG Landers – 5 | Incheon SSG Landers Field | 3:13 | 22,500 |
| 6 | November 8 | Kiwoom Heroes – 3, SSG Landers – 4 | Incheon SSG Landers Field | 2:37 | 22,500 |

== See also ==
- 2022 in baseball
- 2022 Major League Baseball season
