= Kim Chong-hee =

South Korean businessman (1922–1981)

- Born: November 12, 1922; Ten'an, Chūseinan Province, Korea, Empire of Japan
- Died: 1981 (aged 58–59)
- Education: Yonsei University
- Occupation: Chief executive officer
- Website: Hyonam Memorial Hall

- Kim Chong-hee
- Hangul: 김종희
- Hanja: 金鍾喜
- RR: Gim Jonghui
- MR: Kim Chonghŭi

Kim Chong-hee (Korean: 김종희; 1922–1981) was the founder of Hanwha Group and a significant figure in the South Korean explosives industry.

== Korea Explosives Corporation ==
Kim established the Korea Explosives Corporation, a predecessor of the Hanwha Corporation, in 1952. He succeeded in producing dynamite domestically in 1957 and began its commercial production in 1958, contributing to South Korea's industrial growth by supporting the construction of national infrastructure, including bridges, tunnels and highways.

== Expansion ==
Outside the explosives industry, Kim also contributed to the development of the domestic bearing industry by acquiring Shinhan Bearing Industrial in 1964 and advancing it, as well as supporting the growth of the domestic petrochemical industry by establishing Korea Hwasung Industrial (now, Hanwha Chemical and Hanwha L&C). He was also involved in the development of South Korea's dairy industry by acquiring Daeil Dairy in 1973.

== Diplomatic activities ==
Kim was active in private diplomacy in South Korea. He was named an honorary consul-general to Greece in 1968, and in recognition of his contributions to relations between the two countries, he was awarded the Venus Cross Medal of Honor, Greece's highest honorary medal, by the Greek government in 1972.

== Business advocacy ==
Kim was an advocate of business, representing the Korean business community as the vice chairman of the Federation of Korean Industries from 1977 until his death at the age of 59 in 1981. The South Korean government posthumously awarded him a Gold Tower Order of Industrial Service Merit for his contributions to the country's economy.

== Commemorations ==
As a figure in the explosives industry, Kim contributed to South Korea's economic development. His life story was presented by the Korean Chamber of Commerce and Industry in its 2009 publication, Hyeonam Kim Chong-Hee: A Pioneer of the Korean Explosives Industry, as part of its comic book series on the biographies of South Korean CEOs. A commemorative medal was also issued upon his selection as a "Figure of Korea" by the Korea Mint Corporation.
