= Kim Taek-hyeong =

South Korean baseball player (born 1996)

SSG Landers – No. 43
- Pitcher
- Born: October 10, 1996 (age 29); Incheon, South Korea
- Bats: Left Throws: Left

KBO debut
- March 28, 2015, for the Nexen Heroes

Career statistics (through April 6, 2022)
- Win–loss record: 18–19
- Earned run average: 5.49
- Strikeouts: 289

Teams
- Nexen Heroes (2015–2016); SK Wyverns / SSG Landers (2018–present)

Kim Taek-hyeong (Korean: 김택형; born October 10, 1996, in Incheon) is a South Korean pitcher for the SSG Landers in the Korea Baseball Organization. He previously played in KBO for the Nexen Heroes.
