= Hanwha Eagles =

KBO League baseball team in Daejeon, South Korea

- 한화 이글스

Logo	Cap insignia

Information
- League: KBO League (1986–present)
- Location: Daejeon
- Ballpark: Daejeon Hanwha Life Ballpark (2025–present); Cheongju Baseball Stadium (1986–present)
- Established: 1985; 41 years ago
- Korean Series championships: 1999
- League championships: 1989, 1992
- Former name: Binggrae Eagles (1986–1993)
- Former ballpark: Daejeon Hanbat Baseball Stadium (1986–2024)
- Colors: Orange, navy blue, grey and white
- Mascot: Winnie, Vinnie, Soori and Hoodi
- Retired numbers: 21, 23, 35, 52
- Ownership: Kim Seung-youn
- General manager: Seok Jang-hyun
- Manager: Ryu Ji-hyun
- Website: www.hanwhaeagles.co.kr

The Hanwha Eagles (Korean: 한화 이글스) are a South Korean professional baseball team based in Daejeon that competes in the KBO League. The Eagles' home ballpark is Daejeon Hanwha Life Ballpark. As of 2026, they have played in the postseason 14 times. They have won the Korean Series once, in 1999, and the league pennant twice.

== History ==
Founded in 1985 as the Binggrae Eagles (Binggrae was the then-trademark of Hanwha's confectionery branch), they debuted in 1986 as the seventh franchise of the league. Japanese-born pitcher Jang Myeong-bu went 1–18 with a 4.98 ERA in the 1986 season. The team went 31–76 overall in 1986, and Jang retired after the season.

The Eagles made it to the Korean Series four times in their first seven years of existence (in 1988, 1989, 1991, and 1992), losing each time. In 1993, the club changed its name to Hanwha Eagles after Binggrae's separation from Hanwha conglomerate.

Pitchers Song Jin-woo and Jung Min-cheul were the team's one-two punch through the 1990s and much of the 2000s. Song played for the team for 21 seasons, between 1989 and 2009. He currently holds several KBO League pitching records, including his 210 wins, 2,048 strikeouts, and 3,003 innings pitched. He is the only pitcher in KBO League history to win 200 games, and the only one to strike out 2,000 or more batters. Jung, for his part, played 16 seasons for the Eagles (1992–1999 and 2002–2009). He won at least ten games for the team for eight straight seasons, from 1992 through 1999.

The club was renowned for its slugging percentage from the late 1990s to the early 2000s, nicknamed the "Dynamite Bats" in reference to explosive products under one of Hanwha's main business lines. The 1999 championship team was led by American imports Dan Rohrmeier and Jay Davis, as well as Koreans Song Ji-man and Chang Jong-hoon, and had a slugging percentage of .487, the highest team total in KBO League history.

The Eagles made it back to the Korean Series in 2006, again falling short. The Eagles did not make the KBO playoffs for eleven years, from 2008 through 2017, despite going through five managers during that time, including the KBO's two winningest managers, Kim Eung-ryong (2013–2014) and Kim Sung-keun (2015–2017).

Han Yong-duk was hired as Eagles' manager in 2018 (he had been a caretaker manager for the team in 2012), and in his first full season he succeeded in bringing the team to the postseason for the first time since 2007. On 7 June 2020, however, Han resigned as manager after a 14th straight loss, and was replaced by the team's minor league manager (and former television announcer), Choi Won-ho. The team also revamped its roster, sending ten players to the minor-league KBO Futures League team — including veterans An Young-myung, Jang Si-hwan, Lee Tae-yang, Song Kwang-min, and Lee Sung-yul — and bringing up nine players to the KBO League team. After tying the record for the KBO's longest losing streak at 18, on 14 June 2020, the Eagles escaped a 19th-straight defeat after a long struggle: Hanwha won a suspended game against Doosan Bears thanks to Roh Tae-hyung's walk-off hit in the bottom of the ninth inning.

On 27 November 2020, Carlos Subero was announced as the Eagles' new manager. Under his leadership, however, the Eagles finished in last place for two consecutive seasons. After enduring two difficult years, the club sacked Subero midway through the 2023 season and reappointed Choi Won-ho. Choi's second stint as manager was also short-lived, as he resigned in May 2024. Shortly afterward, the Eagles signed a three-year contract with Kim Kyung-moon.

== Logos and uniforms ==
Hanwha Eagles alternative logos (2025–present)
Alternative text logo, also used in the uniforms	Alternative logo, used on some cap hats, uniform details, and website	Alternative text logo, used on the website and "Eagles" used on the uniforms

== Season-by-season records ==
Season	League	Finish	Regular season									Post season	Awards
Season	League	Finish	Rank	Games	Wins	Losses	Draws	Win%	BA	HR	ERA	Post season	Awards
Binggrae Eagles
1986	KBO	7/7	7/7	54	12	42	0	.222	.236	46	3.67	Did not qualify	
1986	KBO	7/7	6/7	54	19	34	1	.358	.236	46	3.67	Did not qualify	
1987	KBO	6/7	6/7	54	24	28	2	.463	.274	48	3.78	Did not qualify	Lee Jong-hoon (ROTY)
1987	KBO	6/7	5/7	54	23	29	2	.444	.274	48	3.78	Did not qualify	Lee Jong-hoon (ROTY)
1988	KBO	2/7	2/7	54	34	20	0	.630	.266	73	3.72	Won playoff vs. Samsung Lions (3–0); Lost Korean Series vs. Haitai Tigers (2–4)	
1988	KBO	2/7	3/7	54	28	25	1	.528	.266	73	3.72	Won playoff vs. Samsung Lions (3–0); Lost Korean Series vs. Haitai Tigers (2–4)	
1989	KBO	2/7	1/7	120	71	46	3	.604	.276	97	3.50	Lost Korean Series vs. Haitai Tigers (1–4)	
1990	KBO	4/7	3/7	120	68	50	2	.575	.270	112	3.41	Lost semi-playoff vs. Samsung Lions (0–2)	
1991	KBO	2/8		126	72	49	5	.591	.274	136	3.35	Won playoff vs. Samsung Lions (3–1); Lost Korean Series vs. Haitai Tigers (0–4)	Chang Jong-hoon (MVP)
1992	KBO	2/8	1/8	126	81	43	2	.651	.267	146	3.68	Lost Korean Series vs. Lotte Giants (1–4)	Chang Jong-hoon (MVP)
1993	KBO	5/8		126	61	61	4	.500	.238	81	3.46	Did not qualify	
Hanwha Eagles
1994	KBO	3/8	3/8	126	65	59	2	.524	.247	68	3.52	Won semi-playoff vs. Haitai Tigers (2–0); Lost playoff vs. Taepyongyang Dolphins (0–3)	
1995	KBO	6/8		126	55	71	0	.437	.249	96	4.04	Did not qualify	
1996	KBO	4/8	3/8	126	70	55	1	.560	.245	90	3.79	Lost semi-playoff vs. Hyundai Unicorns (0–2)	Koo Dae-sung (MVP)
1997	KBO	7/8		126	51	73	2	.413	.253	102	4.06	Did not qualify	
1998	KBO	7/8		126	55	66	5	.455	.250	123	4.26	Did not qualify	
1999	KBO Magic League	1/8	2/4	132	72	58	2	.554	.283	197	4.88	Won playoff vs. Doosan Bears (4–0); Won Korean Series vs. Lotte Giants (4–1)	
2000	KBO Magic League	7/8	3/4	133	50	78	5	.391	.276	180	5.24	Did not qualify	
2001	KBO	4/8	4/8	133	61	68	4	.473	.275	148	4.85	Lost semi-playoff vs. Doosan Bears (0–2)	Kim Tae-kyun (ROTY)
2002	KBO	7/8		133	59	69	5	.461	.256	170	4.79	Did not qualify	
2003	KBO	5/8		133	63	65	5	.492	.254	121	4.38	Did not qualify	
2004	KBO	7/8		133	53	74	6	.417	.268	140	5.24	Did not qualify	
2005	KBO	4/8	4/8	126	64	61	1	.512	.270	159	4.41	Won semi-playoff vs. SK Wyverns (3–2); Lost playoff vs. Doosan Bears (0–3)	
2006	KBO	2/8	3/8	126	67	57	2	.540	.253	110	3.37	Won semi-playoff vs. Kia Tigers (2–1); Won playoff vs. Hyundai Unicorns (3–1); Lost Korean Series vs. Samsung Lions (1–1–4)	Ryu Hyun-jin (ROTY); Ryu Hyun-jin (MVP)
2007	KBO	3/8	3/8	126	67	57	2	.540	.254	104	3.54	Won semi-playoff vs. Samsung Lions (2–1); Lost playoff vs. Doosan Bears (0–3)	
2008	KBO	5/8		126	64	62	0	.508	.254	120	4.43	Did not qualify	
2009	KBO	8/8		133	46	84	3	.354	.269	164	5.71	Did not qualify	
2010	KBO	8/8		133	49	82	2	.374	.244	104	5.43	Did not qualify	
2011	KBO	6/8		133	59	72	2	.450	.255	93	5.11	Did not qualify	
2012	KBO	8/8		133	53	77	3	.408	.249	71	4.55	Did not qualify	
2013	KBO	9/9		128	42	85	1	.331	.259	47	5.31	Did not qualify	
2014	KBO	9/9		128	49	77	2	.389	.283	104	6.35	Did not qualify	
2015	KBO	6/10		144	68	76	0	.472	.271	130	5.11	Did not qualify	
2016	KBO	7/10		144	66	75	3	.468	.289	142	5.76	Did not qualify	
2017	KBO	8/10		144	61	81	2	.430	.287	150	5.28	Did not qualify	
2018	KBO	3/10	3/10	144	77	67	0	.535	.275	151	4.93	Lost semi-playoff vs. Nexen Heroes (1–3)	
2019	KBO	9/10		144	58	86	0	.403	.256	88	4.80	Did not qualify	
2020	KBO	10/10		144	46	95	3	.326	.245	79	5.28	Did not qualify	
2021	KBO	10/10		144	49	83	12	.371	.237	80	4.65	Did not qualify	
2022	KBO	10/10		144	46	96	2	.324	.245	88	4.83	Did not qualify	
2023	KBO	9/10		144	58	80	6	.420	.241	100	4.38	Did not qualify	Moon Dong-ju (ROTY)
2024	KBO	8/10		144	66	76	2	.465	.270	127	4.98	Did not qualify	
2025	KBO	2/10	2/10	144	83	57	4	.593	.266	116	3.55	Won playoff vs. Samsung Lions (3–2); Lost Korean Series vs. LG Twins (1–4)	Cody Ponce (MVP)
2026	KBO	9/10		144	57	83	4	.407	.273	176	5.26	Did not qualify	

== Personnel ==
=== Managers ===
- Bae Seong-seo (1986–1987)
- Kim Yeong-duk (1988–1992)
- Kang Byeong-cheol (1993–1998)
- Lee Hui-su (1998–2000)
- Lee Kwang-hwan (2001–2002)
- Yu Seung-an (2003–2004)
- Kim In-sik (2005–2009)
- Han Dae-hwa (2010–2012)
- Han Yong-duk (2012) (caretaker)
- Kim Eung-ryong (2013–2014)
- Kim Sung-keun (2015–2017)
- Lee Sang-gun (2017) (caretaker)
- Han Yong-duk (2018–2020)
- Choi Won-ho (2020) (caretaker)
- Carlos Subero (2020–2023)
- Choi Won-ho (2023–2024)
- Kim Kyung-moon (2024–2026)
- Ryu Ji-hyun (2026–present)

=== Retired numbers ===
The Eagles have four retired numbers on their roster. Those are for the infielders Chang Jong-hoon (35) and Kim Tae-kyun (52), and the pitchers Jung Min-cheul (23) and Song Jin-woo (21).
