= 2024 Korean Series =

Professional baseball championship in South Korea

- 2024 Shinhan SOL Bank Korean Series
Team (Wins)	Managers	Season
Kia Tigers (4)	Lee Bum-ho	87–55–2 (.613)
Samsung Lions (1)	Park Jin-man	78–64–2 (.549)
- Dates: October 21 – October 28
- Venue(s): Gwangju-Kia Champions Field & Daegu Samsung Lions Park
- MVP: Kim Sun-bin (Kia)
- Umpires: Park Joong-chul, Choi Su-won, Chun Il-soo, Park Ki-taek, Lee Young-jae, Kim Sung-chul, Park Geun-young

Broadcast
- Television: KBS (South Korea – Korean); MBC (South Korea – Korean); SBS (South Korea – Korean)
- TV announcers: Kim Na-jin, Lee Young-eun, Jung Min-cheul and Park Jae-hong (MBC); Kim Jin-woong and Park Yong-taik (KBS); Yoon Seong-ho and Lee Sun-cheol (SBS)

The 2024 Korean Series (known as the 2024 Shinhan SOL Bank Korean Series for sponsorship reasons) was a championship series of the 2024 KBO League season between the Kia Tigers and the Samsung Lions. The Tigers and Lions had the two best win-loss records in the 2024 KBO League season. The Kia Tigers are the 2024 regular season and Korean Series champions.

The Tigers won their record-extending 12th Korean Series title, beating the Lions 4–1. The Tigers also extended their perfect record for Korean Series appearances, going V12 in the team's history.

== Summary ==
Kia Tigers won the series, 4–1.

Game	Date	Score	Location	Time	Attendance
1	October 21–23, 2024	Samsung Lions – 1, Kia Tigers – 5	Gwangju-Kia Champions Field	3:16 (1:48, 1:28)	19,300
2	October 23, 2024	Samsung Lions – 3, Kia Tigers – 8	Gwangju-Kia Champions Field	3:08	19,300
3	October 25, 2024	Kia Tigers – 2, Samsung Lions – 4	Daegu Samsung Lions Park	3:09	23,550
4	October 26, 2024	Kia Tigers – 9, Samsung Lions – 2	Daegu Samsung Lions Park	3:17	23,550
5	October 28, 2024	Samsung Lions – 5, Kia Tigers – 7	Gwangju-Kia Champions Field	3:51	19,300

== Linescores ==
=== Game 1 ===
October 21, 23, 2024 18:30, 16:00 KST at Gwangju-Kia Champions Field
Team	1	2	3	4	5	6	7	8	9	R	H	E
Samsung Lions	0	0	0	0	0	1	0	0	0	1	4	0
Kia Tigers	0	0	0	0	0	0	4	1	X	5	7	3
Starting pitchers: Samsung: Won Tae-in; Kia: James Naile; WP: Kwak Do-Kyu (1–0) LP: Lim Chang-min (0–1); Home runs: Samsung: Kim Hun-gon (1, Solo, 6th TOP, James Naile); Kia: None; Attendance: 19,300; Umpires: Park Joong-chul, Choi Su-won, Chun Il-soo, Park Ki-taek, Lee Young-jae, Kim Sung-chul; Boxscore

The first suspended game in Korean Series history

=== Game 2 ===
October 23, 2024 18:30 KST at Gwangju-Kia Champions Field
Team	1	2	3	4	5	6	7	8	9	R	H	E
Samsung Lions	0	0	0	1	0	1	0	0	1	3	12	3
Kia Tigers	5	1	0	0	1	0	0	1	X	8	10	2
Starting pitchers: Samsung: Hwang Dong-Jae; Kia: Yang Hyeon-jong; WP: Yang Hyeon-jong (1–0) LP: Hwang Dong-Jae (0–1); Home runs: Samsung: None; Kia: Kim Do-yeong (1, Solo, 2nd BOT, Lee Seung-Min); Attendance: 19,300; Umpires: Kim Seong-chul, Park Ki-taek, Choi Su-won, Lee Young-jae, Chun Il-soo; Boxscore

=== Game 3 ===
October 25, 2024 18:30 KST at Daegu Samsung Lions Park
Team	1	2	3	4	5	6	7	8	9	R	H	E
Kia Tigers	0	0	0	0	0	1	0	1	0	2	8	0
Samsung Lions	0	0	1	0	1	0	2	0	X	4	8	1
Starting pitchers: Kia: Eric Lauer; Samsung: Denyi Reyes; WP: Denyi Reyes (1–0) LP: Eric Lauer (0–1) Sv: Kim Jae-yoon (1); Home runs: Kia: None; Samsung: Lee Sung-gyu (1, Solo, 3th BOT, Eric Lauer), Kim Young-Woong (1, Solo, 5th BOT, Eric Lauer), Kim Hun-gon (1, Solo, 7th BOT, Jeon Sang-Hyun), Park Byung-ho (1, Solo, 7th BOT, Jeon Sang-Hyun); Attendance: 23,550; Umpires: Chun Il-soo, Lee Young-jae, Park Ki-taek, Park Joong-chul, Choi Su-won; Boxscore

=== Game 4 ===
October 26, 2024 14:00 KST at Daegu Samsung Lions Park
Team	1	2	3	4	5	6	7	8	9	R	H	E
Kia Tigers	1	0	6	0	0	2	0	0	0	9	13	0
Samsung Lions	0	0	0	1	1	0	0	0	0	2	2	1
Starting pitchers: Kia: James Naile; Samsung: Won Tae-in; WP: James Naile (1–0) LP: Won Tae-in (0–1); Home runs: Kia: Kim Tae-gun (1, Grand Slam, 3rd TOP, Song Eun-beom), Socrates (1, 2-run, 6th TOP, Choi Chae-Heung); Samsung: Lee Jae-hyeon (1, Solo, 5th BOT, James Naile); Attendance: 23,550; Umpires: Choi Su-won, Park Geun-young, Lee Young-jae, Park Joong-chul, Kim Sung-chul, Park Ki-taek; Boxscore

=== Game 5 ===
October 28, 2024 18:30 KST at Gwangju-Kia Champions Field
Team	1	2	3	4	5	6	7	8	9	R	H	E
Samsung Lions	3	0	2	0	0	0	0	0	0	5	5	0
Kia Tigers	1	0	1	0	3	1	0	1	X	7	13	0
Starting pitchers: Samsung: Lee Seung-hyun; Kia: Yang Hyeon-jong; WP: Kwak Do-Kyu (2–0) LP: Lee Sang-Min (0–1) Sv: Jung Hai-Young (1 SV); Home runs: Samsung: Lewin Díaz #1 (1, 2-run, 1st TOP, Yang Hyeon-jong), Kim Young-Woong (2, Solo, 1st TOP, Yang Hyeon-jong), Lewin Díaz #2 (2, 2-run, 3rd TOP, Yang Hyeon-jong); Kia: Choi Hyoung-woo (1, Solo, 6th, Kim Tae-hoon); Attendance: 19,300; Umpires: Park Ki-taek, Park Joong-chul, Park Geun-young, Kim Sung-chul, Lee Young-jae; Boxscore

== See also ==
- 2024 Japan Series
- 2024 World Series
