= Eric Stout =

American baseball player (born 1993)

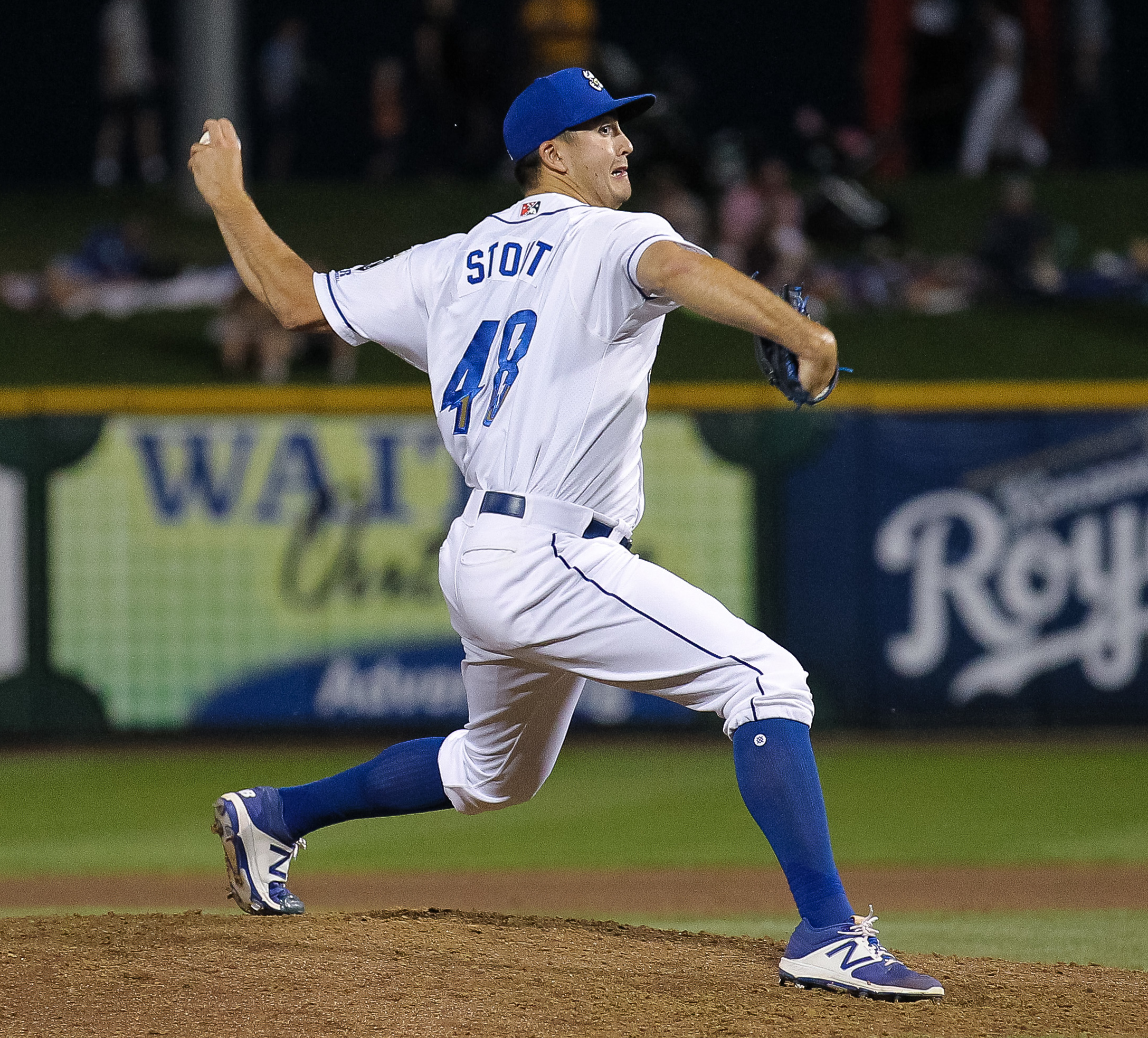
- Stout with the Omaha Storm Chasers in 2017

TSG Hawks – No. 30
- Pitcher
- Born: March 27, 1993 (age 33); Glen Ellyn, Illinois, U.S.
- Bats: Left Throws: Left

Professional debut
- MLB: April 25, 2018, for the Kansas City Royals
- CPBL: August 13, 2023, for the CTBC Brothers
- KBO: September 1, 2024, for the Kia Tigers

MLB statistics (through 2022 season)
- Win–loss record: 0–0
- Earned run average: 7.30
- Strikeouts: 27

CPBL statistics (through April 16, 2026)
- Win–loss record: 28–14
- Earned run average: 2.58
- Strikeouts: 321

KBO statistics (through 2024 season)
- Win–loss record: 1–1
- Earned run average: 5.06
- Strikeouts: 20
- Stats at Baseball Reference

Teams
- Kansas City Royals (2018); Chicago Cubs (2022); Pittsburgh Pirates (2022); CTBC Brothers (2023–2024); Kia Tigers (2024); TSG Hawks (2025–present)

Career highlights and awards
- Korean Series champion (2024)

Eric Joseph Stout (born March 27, 1993) is an American professional baseball pitcher for the TSG Hawks of the Chinese Professional Baseball League (CPBL). He has previously played in Major League Baseball (MLB) for the Kansas City Royals, Chicago Cubs, Pittsburgh Pirates, and in the KBO League for the Kia Tigers.

== Career ==
=== Kansas City Royals ===
Stout was drafted by the Kansas City Royals in the 13th round of the 2014 MLB draft out of Butler University. He signed and was assigned to the Idaho Falls Chukars, where he spent all of his first professional season, going 5–2 with a 3.58 ERA in 32 2/3 innings pitched. In 2015, Stout played for the Arizona League Royals, Lexington Legends, Northwest Arkansas Naturals, and Idaho Falls, posting a combined 0–1 record and 3.15 ERA in 20 games between the four teams. He spent 2016 with Northwest Arkansas, going 6–4 with a 3.86 ERA in 42 games, and 2017 with the Omaha Storm Chasers, pitching to a 5–2 record and 2.99 ERA in 45 games. On November 20, 2017, Royals added Stout to their 40-man roster in order to protect him from the Rule 5 draft.

Stout began 2018 back with Omaha. He was promoted to the Major Leagues for the first time on April 24, 2018. He is the only MLB player to be born in Glen Ellyn, Illinois Stout was designated for assignment on September 5, and later released on September 10.

=== Kansas City T-Bones ===
On January 4, 2019, Stout signed a minor league contract with the San Diego Padres organization. He was released prior to the start of the season on March 27.

On April 1, 2019, Stout signed with the Kansas City T-Bones of the independent American Association of Independent Professional Baseball. He made two starts for Kansas City, posting a 1-1 record and 3.00 ERA with 13 strikeouts over nine innings of work.

=== Cincinnati Reds ===
On May 31, 2019, Stout's contract was purchased by the Cincinnati Reds. He spent the remainder of the year with the Triple–A Louisville Bats, also appearing in one game for the Double–A Chattanooga Lookouts. In 20 contests for Louisville, Stout posted a 6.27 ERA with 52 strikeouts across 60 1/3 innings. He elected free agency following the season on November 4.

=== Chicago Dogs ===
On March 4, 2020, Stout re-signed with the Kansas City T-Bones of the American Association of Independent Professional Baseball. The T-Bones were not selected to compete in the condensed 60-game season due to the COVID-19 pandemic. However, he was later drafted by the Chicago Dogs in the 2020 dispersal draft. Stout was released on July 31.

=== Kansas City Monarchs ===
On January 20, 2021, Stout signed with the Kansas City Monarchs of the American Association of Professional Baseball. Stout recorded a 2–1 record and 1.96 ERA across 4 appearances for Kansas City.

=== Miami Marlins ===
On June 6, 2021, Stout's contract was purchased by the Miami Marlins organization. He was assigned to the Triple-A Jacksonville Jumbo Shrimp. In 7 appearances for Jacksonville, Stout was 0–2 with a 10.19 ERA and 21 strikeouts. On August 12, Stout was released by the Marlins.

=== Kansas City Monarchs (second stint) ===
On August 27, 2021, Stout re-signed with the Kansas City Monarchs of the American Association of Professional Baseball.

=== Chicago Cubs ===
On March 8, 2022, prior to the start of the American Association season, Stout's contract was purchased by the Chicago Cubs organization. Chicago selected Stout's contract on June 13 and designated him for assignment on June 16. During that timespan of June 13 to 16, Stout pitched two games for the Cubs. In his second game on June 15, he struck out four consecutive Padres.

=== Pittsburgh Pirates ===
On June 16, 2022, Stout was claimed off waivers by the Pittsburgh Pirates. On August 10, Stout recorded his first career save. Pitching in relief against the Arizona Diamondbacks, he replaced Wil Crowe and retired the only batter he faced. On November 10, Stout was removed from the 40-man roster and sent outright to the Triple–A Indianapolis Indians; he elected free agency the same day.

=== Seattle Mariners ===
On December 15, 2022, Stout signed a minor league contract to return to the Chicago Cubs. He was released without making an appearance for the organization on April 12, 2023.

On April 13, 2023, Stout signed a minor league contract with the Seattle Mariners. In 21 games (4 starts) for the Triple–A Tacoma Rainiers, he logged a 4.20 ERA with 44 strikeouts in 40 2/3 innings pitched. On July 16, Stout was released by the Mariners organization.

=== CTBC Brothers ===
On July 19, 2023, Stout signed with the CTBC Brothers of the Chinese Professional Baseball League (CPBL). In 12 starts, he logged a 6–5 record and 3.28 ERA with 79 strikeouts across 68 2/3 innings pitched.

Stout made 20 appearances (19 starts) for the Brothers in 2024, compiling a 10–5 record and 2.77 ERA with 109 strikeouts over 113 2/3 innings of work.

=== Kia Tigers ===
On August 28, 2024, Stout signed a contract with the Kia Tigers of the KBO League as an injury replacement for James Naile. In 4 starts for the Tigers, he posted a 1–1 record and 5.06 ERA with 20 strikeouts across 16 innings of work. Stout's season ended prematurely after he suffered a hamstring injury on September 19. Despite his absence, the Tigers would go on to win the 2024 Korean Series.

=== TSG Hawks ===
On January 10, 2025, Stout signed with the TSG Hawks of the Chinese Professional Baseball League. He made 25 starts for the Hawks, compiling a 11-4 record and 2.23 ERA with 124 strikeouts across 141 1/3 innings pitched.

On December 23, 2025, Stout re-signed with the Hawks on a one-year contract.
