= 2021 KBO League season =

2021 KBO League
- League: KBO League
- Sport: Baseball
- Duration: April 3 – October 31
- Games: 144 per team
- Teams: 10
- TV partner(s): KBS, MBC, SBS, SPOTV, ESPN

Regular Season
- Season champions: KT Wiz
- Season MVP: Ariel Miranda (Doosan)

Postseason
- Wild Card champions: Doosan Bears
- Wild Card runners-up: Kiwoom Heroes
- Semi-playoffs champions: Doosan Bears
- Semi-playoffs runners-up: LG Twins
- Playoffs champions: Doosan Bears
- Playoffs runners-up: Samsung Lions

Korean Series
- Champions: KT Wiz
- Runners-up: Doosan Bears
- Finals MVP: Park Kyung-su

KBO League seasons
- ← 2020 2022 →

The 2021 KBO League season, also known by naming rights sponsorship as 2021 Shinhan Bank SOL KBO League (Korean: 2021 신한은행 SOL KBO 리그), was the 40th season in the history of the KBO League.

At the conclusion of the regular season, all five playoff positions were undecided going into the final day of the schedule. The Samsung Lions and KT Wiz met in a tiebreaker game to decide the regular season champion, the first such game since 1985. The NC Dinos became the first defending champion to miss the playoffs since the Kia Tigers in 2010, while the Doosan Bears qualified for the seventh consecutive year. In the postseason, the Korean Series was won by KT Wiz, who defeated the Doosan Bears who had advanced the championship series as a wild card.

2021 also marked the first KBO season for the SSG Landers, formerly known as the SK Wyverns.

== Season format ==
The KBO is a 10-team league. Each team plays 144 games, facing the other nine teams 16 times apiece. Games are declared ties after 12 innings (15 in the postseason), and those contests have no bearing on a team’s winning percentage. Five teams make the playoffs, where the league uses a step-ladder format; the fifth- and fourth-placed teams battle in a Wild Card round, the winner faces the three seed, and so on. Teams are limited to three foreign players each. Only two such players are allowed in the lineup at any one time, so teams generally roster two pitchers and one position player.

== Standings ==
Regular season standings
Rank	Team	GP	W	L	D	Pct.	GB	Postseason
T-1**	KT Wiz	144	76	59	9	.563	—	Korean Series
T-1*	Samsung Lions	144	76	59	9	.563	—	Playoff
3	LG Twins	144	72	58	14	.554	1½	Semi-playoff
4	Doosan Bears	144	71	65	8	.522	5½	Wildcard Game
5	Kiwoom Heroes	144	70	67	7	.511	7	Wildcard Game
6	SSG Landers	144	66	64	14	.508	7½	Did not qualify
7	NC Dinos	144	67	68	9	.496	9	Did not qualify
8	Lotte Giants	144	65	71	8	.478	11½	Did not qualify
9	Kia Tigers	144	58	76	10	.433	17½	Did not qualify
10	Hanwha Eagles	144	49	83	12	.371	25½	Did not qualify

*Samsung Lions hosted tiebreaker game by virtue of head-to-head record with KT Wiz (9-6-1)

**KT Wiz won against Samsung Lions 1-0 in the tiebreaker game

== Postseason ==
Wild Card
4	Doosan Bears	2
5	Kiwoom Heroes	1

Semi-playoff
3	LG Twins	1
4	Doosan Bears	2

Playoff
2	Samsung Lions	0
4	Doosan Bears	2

Korean Series
1	KT Wiz	4
4	Doosan Bears	0

=== Wild Card ===
The series started with a 1–0 advantage for the fourth-placed team.

Doosan Bears (2) vs. Kiwoom Heroes (1)

Game	Date	Score	Location	Time	Attendance
1	November 1	Kiwoom Heroes – 7, Doosan Bears – 4	Jamsil Baseball Stadium	4:09	12,422
2	November 2	Kiwoom Heroes – 8, Doosan Bears – 16	Jamsil Baseball Stadium	3:52	9,425

=== Semi-playoff ===
LG Twins (1) vs. Doosan Bears (2)

Game	Date	Score	Location	Time	Attendance
1	November 4	Doosan Bears – 5, LG Twins – 1	Jamsil Baseball Stadium	4:05	19,846
2	November 5	LG Twins – 9, Doosan Bears – 3	Jamsil Baseball Stadium	4:10	21,679
3	November 7	Doosan Bears – 10, LG Twins – 3	Jamsil Baseball Stadium	3:40	23,800

=== Playoff ===
Samsung Lions (0) vs. Doosan Bears (2)

Game	Date	Score	Location	Time	Attendance
1	November 9	Doosan Bears – 6, Samsung Lions – 4	Daegu Samsung Lions Park	3:28	22,079
2	November 10	Samsung Lions – 3, Doosan Bears – 11	Jamsil Baseball Stadium	3:45	22,109

=== Korean Series ===
KT Wiz (4) vs. Doosan Bears (0)

Game	Date	Score	Location	Time	Attendance
1	November 14	Doosan Bears – 2, KT Wiz – 4	Gocheok Sky Dome	2:51	16,200
2	November 15	Doosan Bears – 1, KT Wiz – 6	Gocheok Sky Dome	2:38	12,904
3	November 17	KT Wiz – 3, Doosan Bears – 1	Gocheok Sky Dome	3:26	13,312
4	November 18	KT Wiz – 8, Doosan Bears – 4	Gocheok Sky Dome	3:45	13,796

== See also ==
- 2021 in baseball
- 2021 Major League Baseball season
- 2021 Nippon Professional Baseball season
