= James Naile =

American baseball player (born 1993)

Kia Tigers – No. 40
- Pitcher
- Born: February 8, 1993 (age 33); Cape Girardeau, Missouri, U.S.
- Bats: Right Throws: Right

Professional debut
- MLB: June 27, 2022, for the St. Louis Cardinals
- KBO: March 27, 2024, for the Kia Tigers

MLB statistics (through 2023 season)
- Win–loss record: 0–0
- Earned run average: 7.40
- Strikeouts: 12

KBO statistics (through August 18, 2026)
- Win–loss record: 29-14
- Earned run average: 2.79
- Strikeouts: 399
- Stats at Baseball Reference

Teams
- St. Louis Cardinals (2022–2023); Kia Tigers (2024–present)

Career highlights and awards
- Korean Series champion (2024)

James Aubrey Naile (born February 8, 1993) is an American professional baseball pitcher for the Kia Tigers of the KBO League. He previously played in Major League Baseball (MLB) for the St. Louis Cardinals.

== Amateur career ==
Naile graduated from Charleston High School in Charleston, Missouri. He attended Parkland College, a junior college, despite receiving offers from Arkansas State University and Southeast Missouri State University, which both play college baseball in NCAA Division I. After spending two years at Parkland, Naile transferred to the University of Alabama at Birmingham (UAB) to play for the UAB Blazers. Naile had Tommy John surgery to repair the ulnar collateral ligament of the elbow in 2013.

== Professional career ==
=== Oakland Athletics ===
The Oakland Athletics drafted Naile in the 20th round, with the 608th overall selection, of the 2015 Major League Baseball draft. He split his first professional season between the rookie–level Arizona League Athletics and Low–A Vermont Lake Monsters. Naile split the 2016 campaign between the Single–A Beloit Snappers, High–A Stockton Ports, Double–A Midland RockHounds, and Triple–A Nashville Sounds, accumulating a 9–11 record and 3.39 ERA with 125 strikeouts across 28 games (26 starts). Following the season, Naile was named the best defensive pitcher in Minor League Baseball.

Naile split 2017 between Midland, Stockton, and the AZL Athletics, compiling a 2–3 record and 3.30 ERA with 57 strikeouts across 18 games (14 starts). He made 26 starts for Midland and Nashville in 2018, registering an 8–10 record and 4.54 ERA with 84 strikeouts across 150 2/3 innings pitched. Naile split the 2019 season between Midland and the Triple–A Las Vegas Aviators. In 27 games (24 starts) for the two affiliates, he compiled a 10–7 record and 5.41 ERA with 92 strikeouts over 141 1/3 innings of work.

Naile did not play in a game in 2020 due to the cancellation of the minor league season because of the COVID-19 pandemic. He spent 2021 with Las Vegas, making 51 appearances out of the bullpen and posting an 8–0 record and 4.04 ERA with 51 strikeouts across 62 1/3 innings pitched. Naile elected free agency following the season on November 7, 2021.

=== St. Louis Cardinals ===
On November 18, 2021, Naile signed a minor league contract with the St. Louis Cardinals. The Cardinals promoted Naile to the major leagues for the first time on June 27, 2022. He made his MLB debut that night versus the Miami Marlins, pitching one scoreless inning of relief. He made seven total appearances for the Cardinals in his rookie campaign, posting a 5.00 ERA with five strikeouts in nine innings pitched.

On February 8, 2023, Naile was designated for assignment by St. Louis following the acquisition of Anthony Misiewicz. On February 10, Naile cleared waivers and was sent outright to the Triple-A Memphis Redbirds. In 6 games with Memphis, Naile posted a 3-1 record and 2.50 ERA with 19 strikeouts. On May 5, his contract was selected to the active roster. In 10 major league contests for St. Louis, Naile struggled to an 8.80 ERA with 7 strikeouts across 15 1/3 innings of work.

=== Kia Tigers ===
On January 19, 2024, the Cardinals sold Naile's contract to the Kia Tigers of the KBO League. On August 24, Naile was struck in the face by a comebacker off the bat of Matt Davidson, and later diagnosed with a fractured jaw. He was temporarily replaced by Eric Stout. In 26 total starts for the Tigers, he compiled a 12–5 record and 2.53 ERA with 138 strikeouts across 149 1/3 innings pitched. With Kia, Naile won the 2024 Korean Series.

On November 26, 2024, Naile re–signed with the Tigers on a $1.6 million contract. He made 27 starts for Kia in 2025, compiling an 8-4 record and 2.25 ERA with 152 strikeouts across 164 1/3 innings pitched.

On November 26, 2025, Naile re-signed with the Tigers on a one-year, $1.8 million contract.

== Personal life ==
Naile grew up as a fan of the Cardinals. His mother died in 2018.
