= 2021 Korean Series =

Team (Wins)	Managers	Season
KT Wiz (4)	Lee Kang-chul	76–59–9 (.563)
Doosan Bears (0)	Kim Tae-hyoung	71–65–8 (.522)
- Dates: November 14 – 18
- MVP: Park Kyung-su (KT Wiz)

The 2021 Korean Series was the championship series for the KBO League for the 2021 KBO League season. The 40th edition of the Korean Series, all games in the best-of-seven series were held at the Gocheok Sky Dome due to the cold weather. The KT Wiz won the series over the Doosan Bears, 4–0. Park Kyung-su won the Korean Series Most Valuable Player Award.

== Summary ==
KT Wiz (4) vs. Doosan Bears (0)

Game	Date	Score	Location	Time	Attendance
1	November 14	Doosan Bears – 2, KT Wiz – 4	Gocheok Sky Dome	2:51	16,200
2	November 15	Doosan Bears – 1, KT Wiz – 6	Gocheok Sky Dome	2:38	12,904
3	November 17	KT Wiz – 3, Doosan Bears – 1	Gocheok Sky Dome	3:26	13,312
4	November 18	KT Wiz – 8, Doosan Bears – 4	Gocheok Sky Dome	3:45	13,796

== Matchups ==
=== Game 1 ===
November 14, 2021 at Gocheok Sky Dome
Team	1	2	3	4	5	6	7	8	9	R	H	E
Doosan Bears	0	0	0	0	1	0	0	0	1	2	9	2
KT Wiz	0	0	0	1	0	0	3	0	X	4	7	1
WP: William Cuevas (1–0) LP: Lee Young-ha (0–1) Sv: Kim Jae-yoon; Home runs: DOO: None; KT: Bae Jung-dae (1); Boxscore

William Cuevas pitched 7 2/3 innings for the KT Wiz in Game 1. With the score tied 1–1 in the seventh inning, Bae Jung-dae hit the go-ahead home run for the Wiz.

=== Game 2 ===
November 15, 2021 at Gocheok Sky Dome
Team	1	2	3	4	5	6	7	8	9	R	H	E
Doosan Bears	0	0	0	0	0	0	0	1	0	1	6	0
KT Wiz	1	0	0	0	5	0	0	0	X	6	8	0
WP: So Hyeong-jun (1–0) LP: Choi Won-joon (0–1); Home runs: DOO: None; KT: Hwang Jae-gyun (1); Boxscore

Kang Baek-ho reached base in eight consecutive plate appearances in Games 1 and 2, tying a Korean Series record.

=== Game 3 ===
November 17, 2021 at Gocheok Sky Dome
Team	1	2	3	4	5	6	7	8	9	R	H	E
KT Wiz	0	0	0	0	1	0	2	0	0	3	8	0
Doosan Bears	0	0	0	0	0	0	0	1	0	1	5	0
WP: Odrisamer Despaigne (1–0) LP: Ariel Miranda (0–1) Sv: Kim Jae-yeon; Home runs: KT: Park Kyung-su (1); DOO: None; Boxscore

KT Wiz' second baseman Park Kyung-su hit a home run in the fifth inning to start the scoring. Later in the game, he tore a muscle in his right calf, forcing him to miss the remainder of the series.

=== Game 4 ===
November 18, 2021 at Gocheok Sky Dome
Team	1	2	3	4	5	6	7	8	9	R	H	E
KT Wiz	3	2	0	0	1	0	2	0	0	8	13	1
Doosan Bears	0	0	0	1	0	2	0	1	0	4	7	0
WP: Bae Je-seong (1–0) LP: Gwak Been (0–1); Home runs: KT: Shin Bon-ki (1), Jared Hoying (1); DOO: Kim Jae-hwan (1); Boxscore

The KT Wiz completed a four-game sweep of the Doosan Bears. Park Kyung-su won the Korean Series Most Valuable Player Award.

== See also ==
- 2021 Japan Series
- 2021 World Series
- 2021 Taiwan Series
