= Eric Lauer =

American baseball player (born 1995)

Free agent
- Pitcher
- Born: June 3, 1995 (age 31); Elyria, Ohio, U.S.
- Bats: Right Throws: Left

Professional debut
- MLB: April 24, 2018, for the San Diego Padres
- KBO: August 11, 2024, for the Kia Tigers

MLB statistics (through 2026 season)
- Win–loss record: 53–46
- Earned run average: 4.28
- Strikeouts: 741

KBO statistics (through 2024 season)
- Win–loss record: 2–2
- Earned run average: 4.93
- Strikeouts: 37
- Stats at Baseball Reference

Teams
- San Diego Padres (2018–2019); Milwaukee Brewers (2020–2023); Kia Tigers (2024); Toronto Blue Jays (2025–2026); Los Angeles Dodgers (2026)

Career highlights and awards
- Korean Series champion (2024)

Eric Lance Lauer (born June 3, 1995) is an American professional baseball pitcher who is a free agent. He has previously played in Major League Baseball (MLB) for the San Diego Padres, Milwaukee Brewers, Toronto Blue Jays, and Los Angeles Dodgers, and in the KBO League for the Kia Tigers. He played college baseball for the Kent State Golden Flashes of Kent State University.

Lauer won the National Pitcher of the Year Award at Kent State and the Padres selected him in the first round of the 2016 MLB draft. He made his MLB debut with the Padres in 2018 and was traded to the Brewers before the 2020 season. Lauer played for Milwaukee through 2023 and pitched for the Tigers in 2024, winning the 2024 Korean Series. He returned to MLB in 2025 with the Blue Jays.

== Early life ==
Lauer was born and raised in Elyria, Ohio. He attended Midview High School in Grafton, Ohio, where he played for the school's baseball team as a pitcher and was a member of the National Honor Society. Lauer took college courses at Lorain County Community College while still in high school. He grew up as a fan of the Cleveland Indians of Major League Baseball (MLB).

== Career ==
=== Amateur career ===
At Midview, Lauer played for the baseball team as a pitcher and first baseman. He received attention from MLB scouts as a result of his 94-mile-per-hour (151 km/h) fastball. He decided to commit to play college baseball for the University of Kentucky, but he rescinded the decision and committed to Kent State University. As a senior at Midview, Lauer pitched to a 7–0 win–loss record and a 0.15 earned run average (ERA), allowing one earned run in 47 innings pitched, while striking out 96 and allowing 12 hits and eight walks. The Cleveland Plain Dealer named Lauer their player of the year for 2013, and he was named Lorain County's Mr. Baseball.

The Toronto Blue Jays selected Lauer in the 17th round of the 2013 MLB draft. Lauer turned down a signing bonus in excess of $1 million to attend college. Playing for the Kent State Golden Flashes, Lauer had a 5–4 win–loss record, a 1.98 ERA, and 103 strikeouts in 2015, in his sophomore year. During the summer, Lauer pitched for the Orleans Firebirds in the Cape Cod Baseball League and was named a league all-star. He finished his junior year with a 0.69 ERA, the lowest in college baseball since 1979. He won the National Pitcher of the Year Award and Mid-American Conference Baseball Pitcher of the Year Award.

=== San Diego Padres ===
The San Diego Padres selected Lauer in the first round, with the 25th overall selection, of the 2016 MLB draft. He signed with the Padres, receiving a $2 million signing bonus. Lauer made his professional debut with the Arizona Padres of the Rookie-level Arizona League, and received promotions to the Tri-City Dust Devils of the Low–A Northwest League and the Fort Wayne TinCaps of the Single–A Midwest League. He finished the 2016 season with a 1–1 record and 2.03 ERA. He also had 37 strikeouts in 31 innings pitched.

Lauer began the 2017 season with the Lake Elsinore Storm of the High–A California League. He pitched to a 2–5 record and a 2.79 ERA with 84 strikeouts in 67 2/3 innings, and was promoted to the San Antonio Missions of the Double–A Texas League in July. In 10 games (nine starts) for the Missions, he was 4–3 with a 3.93 ERA. Lauer began the 2018 season with the El Paso Chihuahuas of the Triple–A Pacific Coast League.

Lauer was promoted to the major leagues on April 24, 2018. He made his debut the same day, pitching three innings against the Colorado Rockies, yielding six earned runs on six hits and four walks in three innings. He was 6–7 in 23 starts for the Padres with a 4.34 ERA, striking out 100 in 112 innings. He led the major leagues in pickoffs, with 10, while giving up only five stolen bases with two caught stealing.

=== Milwaukee Brewers ===
On November 27, 2019, the Padres traded Lauer and Luis Urías to the Milwaukee Brewers in exchange for Trent Grisham, Zach Davies, and cash considerations or a player to be named later. On July 11, 2020, Lauer was placed on the injured list after coming into close contact with somebody who tested positive for COVID-19. On July 26, Lauer was activated from the injured list and appeared in his first game against the Chicago Cubs. Lauer played through a shoulder injury in 2020, recording a 13.09 ERA with 12 strikeouts in 11 innings pitched across four games.

On May 26, 2021, Lauer hit his first career home run, a solo shot off of Chris Paddack of the Padres. He had a 3.19 ERA in 20 games started during the 2021 season. Lauer made 29 starts for Milwaukee during the 2022 campaign, compiling an 11–7 record and 3.69 ERA with 157 strikeouts across 158 2/3 innings pitched.

On January 13, 2023, Lauer agreed to a one-year, $5.075 million contract with the Brewers, avoiding salary arbitration. In 10 games (9 starts) for Milwaukee in 2023, he struggled to a 4–6 record and 6.56 ERA with 43 strikeouts in 46 2/3 innings pitched. Following the season on October 20, Lauer was removed from the 40-man roster and sent outright to the Triple–A Nashville Sounds, but denied the assignment and elected free agency on October 23.

=== Pittsburgh Pirates ===
On March 7, 2024, Lauer signed a minor league contract with the Pittsburgh Pirates. In 8 games (6 starts) for the Triple–A Indianapolis Indians, he compiled a 5.52 ERA with 37 strikeouts across 29 1/3 innings pitched. On May 16, Lauer exercised the opt–out clause in his contract and was granted his release by the Pirates.

=== Houston Astros ===
On May 20, 2024, Lauer signed a minor league contract with the Houston Astros. In 11 games (10 starts) for the Triple–A Sugar Land Space Cowboys, he compiled a 5.09 ERA with 49 strikeouts across 46 innings pitched. Lauer was released by August 1 in order to pursue a playing opportunity in Korea.

=== Kia Tigers ===
On August 1, 2024, Lauer signed with the Kia Tigers of the KBO League. On August 11, he made his debut for the team, starting in a 5–4 loss at home to the Samsung Lions. In 7 starts for the team, he logged a 2–2 record and 4.93 ERA with 37 strikeouts across 34 2/3 innings pitched. With Kia, Lauer won the 2024 Korean Series. On November 30, the Tigers non–tendered Lauer, making him a free agent.

=== Toronto Blue Jays ===
On December 13, 2024, Lauer signed a minor league contract with the Toronto Blue Jays. He began the year with the Triple-A Buffalo Bisons, posting a 1–3 record and 4.50 ERA with 21 strikeouts over his first five starts. On April 30, 2025, the Blue Jays selected Lauer's contract, adding him to their active roster. Lauer had a 9-2 record and 3.18 ERA during the regular season. He also pitched 8 2/3 innings during the Blue Jays run to the 2025 World Series, including 4 2/3 innings in the 18 inning record setting World Series game 3.

Prior to the 2026 season, Lauer and the Blue Jays went to salary arbitration, with the arbiter choosing Toronto's $4.4 million proposal over Lauer's request for $5.75 million. The Blue Jays often had Lauer pitch after an opener, which he said he "can't stand". After pitching to a 6.69 ERA in 36 1/3 innings, Lauer was designated for assignment on May 11, 2026.

=== Los Angeles Dodgers ===
On May 17, 2026, Lauer was traded to the Los Angeles Dodgers in exchange for cash considerations and a player to be named later. He made 12 starts for the Dodgers (and two relief appearances) during the regular season, posting a 7–2 record and 4.50 ERA with 46 strikeouts. Lauer was placed on the injured list with left elbow inflammation on September 2 and remained there the rest of the season.

== Personal life ==
Lauer and his wife, Emily, have a son.
