= Lee Seung-hyun =

Lee Seung-hyun (Korean: 이승현) is a Korean name consisting of the family name Lee and the given name Seung-hyun, and may also refer to:

- Lee Seoung-hyun (born 1990), South Korean basketball player
- Lee Seung-hyun (footballer) (born 1985), South Korean footballer
- Lee Seung-hyun (baseball), South Korean baseball player
- Seungri (born 1990), South Korean singer
- Lee Seung-hyun (esports player) (born 1997), better known as "Life", South Korean StarCraft II player
