= Socrates Brito =

Dominican baseball player (born 1992)

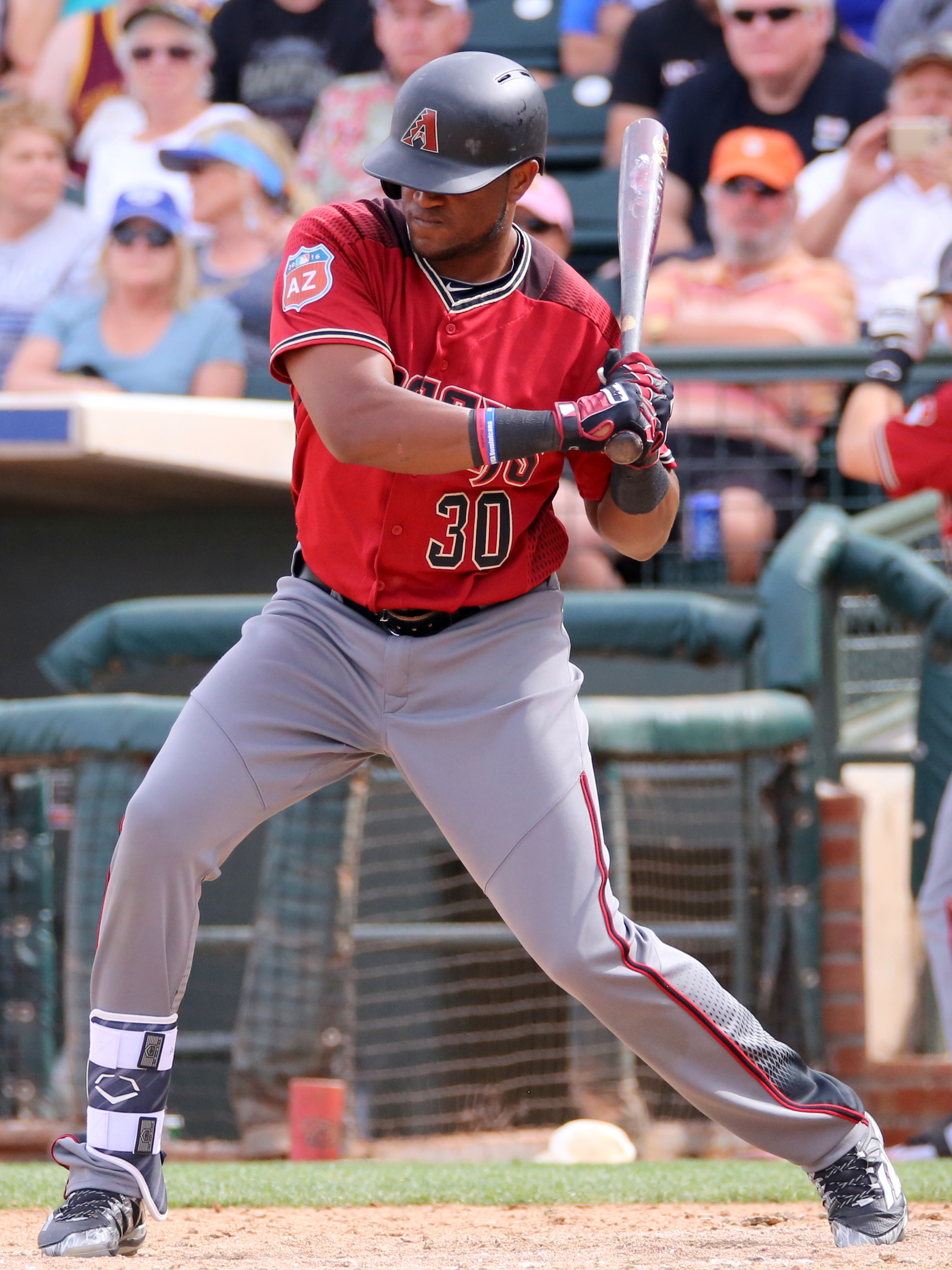
- Brito with the Arizona Diamondbacks

Leones del Escogido – No. 19
- Outfielder
- Born: September 6, 1992 (age 34); Azua, Dominican Republic
- Bats: Left Throws: Left

Professional debut
- MLB: September 8, 2015, for the Arizona Diamondbacks
- KBO: April 2, 2022, for the Kia Tigers

MLB statistics (through 2019 season)
- Batting average: .179
- Home runs: 5
- Runs batted in: 18

KBO statistics (through 2024 season)
- Batting average: .302
- Home runs: 63
- Runs batted in: 270
- Stats at Baseball Reference

Teams
- Arizona Diamondbacks (2015–2016, 2018); Toronto Blue Jays (2019); Kia Tigers (2022–2024)

Career highlights and awards
- KBO: Korean Series champion (2024); 2x KBO All–Star (2022, 2023)

Socrates Orel Brito (born September 6, 1992) is a Dominican professional baseball outfielder for the Sultanes de Monterrey of the Mexican League. He has previously played in Major League Baseball (MLB) for the Arizona Diamondbacks and Toronto Blue Jays, and in the KBO League for the Kia Tigers.

== Career ==
=== Arizona Diamondbacks ===
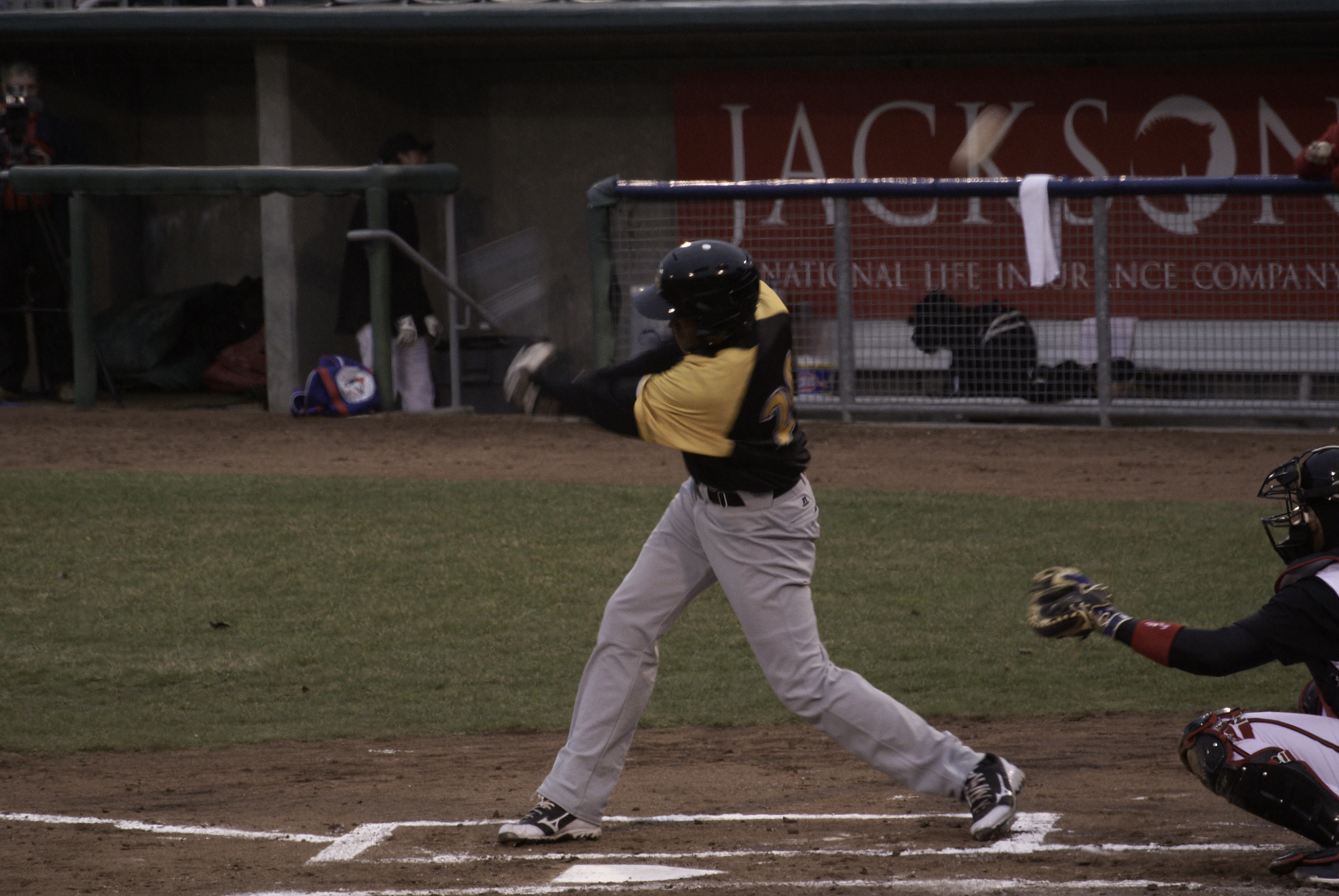
Brito batting for the South Bend Silver Hawks in 2013

Brito was signed by the Arizona Diamondbacks in 2010 out of the Dominican Republic. He was added to their 40-man roster on November 20, 2014, after he batted .293 with 38 stolen bases for the Visalia Rawhide of the High–A California League. Brito began the 2015 season with the Mobile BayBears of the Double–A Southern League. Brito was chosen to represent the Diamondbacks at the 2015 All-Star Futures Game. He made his MLB debut on September 8, 2015. Brito was named the Diamondbacks' Minor League Player of the Year for 2015.

Brito competed with Yasmany Tomas for playing time in 2016, but broke a big toe in June 2016. He injured his hamate bone while playing in winter baseball after the season, and had surgery to repair a dislocated finger on his right hand in the spring in 2017. He again injured a finger during winter baseball after the 2017 season. In 2018, in 40 at bats he hit .196/.358/.554 with two stolen bases. He had the fastest baserunning sprint speed of all major league right fielders, at 29.9 feet/second. Playing for the Reno Aces of the Triple–A Pacific Coast League, he was selected for the Triple-A All-Star Game.

=== Toronto Blue Jays ===
The San Diego Padres claimed Brito off of waivers on March 27, 2019. Brito was designated for assignment on March 30, following the promotion of Nick Margevicius.

On April 2, 2019, Brito was traded to the Toronto Blue Jays in exchange for Rodrigo Orozco. Brito was called up by the Blue Jays on April 4. He was designated for assignment on May 10 after an abysmal start to the season in which he batted .077. Brito spent the rest of the season in Triple–A with the Buffalo Bisons, hitting .282/.328/.510 with 16 home runs, and was named the Bisons MVP for 2019. In 2019 in the major leagues, he again had the fastest sprint speed of all major league right fielders, at 29.8 feet/second. Brito elected free agency following the season on November 4.

=== Pittsburgh Pirates ===
On December 17, 2019, Brito signed a minor league contract with the Pittsburgh Pirates. On July 5, 2020, it was announced that Brito had tested positive for COVID-19. Brito opted out of the 2020 season on September 1, after his brother died from COVID-19. He became a free agent on November 2.

=== New York Yankees ===
On January 1, 2021, Brito signed a minor league contract with the New York Yankees organization. Brito spent the 2021 season with the Triple-A Scranton/Wilkes-Barre Railriders. He played in 107 games, hitting .251 with 9 home runs and 53 RBI. Brito became a free agent.

=== Kia Tigers ===
On December 26, 2021, Brito signed with the Kia Tigers of the KBO League. Brito was named a KBO All-Star for the team in 2022, but did not participate due to injury and was replaced by Kim Hyun-soo.

On November 9, 2022, Brito re-signed a one-year contract for the 2023 season worth $1.1 million. Brito was named a KBO All–Star in 2023. In 142 games for the team, he batted .285/.344/.463 with 20 home runs, 96 RBI, and 15 stolen bases.

On December 18, 2023, Brito again re–signed with the Tigers on a one–year, $800,000 contract. In 140 games for the team in 2024, he slashed .310/.359/.516 with 26 home runs, 97 RBI, and 13 stolen bases. With Kia, Brito won the 2024 Korean Series. He became a free agent following the season.

=== El Águila de Veracruz ===
On February 22, 2025, Brito signed with El Águila de Veracruz of the Mexican League. In 93 appearances for Veracruz, Brito batted .323/.406/.486 with 11 home runs, 60 RBI, and 21 stolen bases.

=== Sultanes de Monterrey ===
On January 9, 2026, Brito was traded on loan to the Sultanes de Monterrey in exchange for Sebastián Elizalde and infielder Roberto Valenzuela.

== Personal life ==
Brito is a second cousin to fellow major leaguer Franchy Cordero.
