= 2024 in baseball =

The following are the baseball events of the year 2024 throughout the world.

== International competition ==
=== National Team tournaments ===
- Baseball United Arab Classic (November 7–10): Pakistan
- Baseball5 World Cup (October 7–12): Cuba
- Caribbean Baseball Cup (October 23–28): Curaçao
- East Asia Baseball Cup (October 29 – November 4): Philippines
- Haarlem Baseball Week (July 12–19): Japan
- U-15 Baseball World Cup (August 16–25): Japan
- U-23 Baseball World Cup (September 6–15): Japan
- WBSC Premier12 (November 9–24): Chinese Taipei
- Women's Baseball World Cup (July 28 – August 3): Japan

=== Club team tournaments ===
- 2024 Caribbean Series (February 1–9): Tiburones de La Guaira
- European Champions Cup: Tenerife Marlins

== North American domestic leagues ==
=== Major League Baseball ===
Wild Card Series (ALWCS, NLWCS)
4	Baltimore	0
5	Kansas City	2
3	Houston	0
6	Detroit	2
4	San Diego	2
5	Atlanta	0
3	Milwaukee	1
6	NY Mets	2

Division Series (ALDS, NLDS)
1	NY Yankees	3
5	Kansas City	1
American League
2	Cleveland	3
6	Detroit	2
1	LA Dodgers	3
4	San Diego	2
National League
2	Philadelphia	1
6	NY Mets	3

Championship Series (ALCS, NLCS)
1	NY Yankees	4
2	Cleveland	1
1	LA Dodgers	4
6	NY Mets	2

World Series
AL1	NY Yankees	1
NL1	LA Dodgers	4

=== Minor League Baseball ===
- Triple–A
  - International League: Omaha Storm Chasers (Kansas City Royals)
  - Pacific Coast League: Sugar Land Space Cowboys (Houston Astros)
    - Triple-A National Championship Game: Sugar Land Space Cowboys (Houston Astros)
- Double–A
  - Eastern League: Erie SeaWolves (Detroit Tigers)
  - Southern League: Birmingham Barons (Chicago White Sox)
  - Texas League: Arkansas Travelers (Seattle Mariners)
- High–A
  - Midwest League: Lake County Captains (Cleveland Guardians)
  - Northwest League: Spokane Indians (Colorado Rockies)
  - South Atlantic League: Bowling Green Hot Rods (Tampa Bay Rays)
- Single–A
  - California League: Modesto Nuts (Seattle Mariners)
  - Carolina League: Fredericksburg Nationals (Washington Nationals)
  - Florida State League: Palm Beach Cardinals (St. Louis Cardinals)
- Rookie
  - Arizona Complex League: AZL Dodgers (Los Angeles Dodgers)
  - Dominican Summer League: DSL Red Sox (Boston Red Sox)
  - Florida Complex League: FCL Tigers (Detroit Tigers)
- Fall League
  - Arizona Fall League: Salt River Rafters

=== Independent baseball leagues ===
- MLB Partner Leagues
  - American Association of Professional Baseball: Kane County Cougars
  - Atlantic League of Professional Baseball: York Revolution
  - Frontier League: Québec Capitales
  - Pioneer League: Yolo High Wheelers
- Non-partner leagues
  - Empire Professional Baseball League: Tupper Lake Riverpigs
  - Pecos League: Alpine Cowboys
  - United Shore Professional Baseball League: Birmingham-Bloomfield Beavers
  - Intercounty Baseball League: Barrie Baycats

=== College Baseball ===
- NCAA
  - 2024 College World Series (Division I): Tennessee
  - Division II: Tampa
  - Division III: Misericordia
- NAIA: Hope International
- USCAA: Cincinnati Clermont
- NCCAA: Southwestern Christian (OK)
- Junior College World Series:
  - NJCAA Division I: Blinn
  - NJCAA Division II: LSU–Eunice
  - NJCAA Division III: Rowan College
  - California: Saddleback
  - Northwest: Linn–Benton

=== Collegiate Summer Baseball Leagues ===
- Appalachian League: Danville Otterbots
- Cape Cod League: Harwich Mariners
- MLB Draft League: Williamsport Crosscutters
- New England Collegiate Baseball League: Newport Gulls

=== Little League ===
- Little League World Series: Lake Mary Little League (Lake Mary, Florida)
- Intermediate League World Series: Eastbank Little League (Kenner, Louisiana)
- Junior League World Series: Shing-Ming Junior Little League (Taoyuan, Taiwan)
- Senior League World Series: Coquivacoa Little League (Maracaibo, Venezuela)

== Other domestic leagues ==
=== Summer leagues ===
- Cuban National Series: Leñadores de Las Tunas
- Dutch League—Holland Series: Neptunus
- Finnish League: Espoo Expos
- French League: Huskies de Rouen
- German League: Bonn Capitals
- Italian Baseball League: Parma Baseball Club
- Irish League: Mariners Baseball
- Korean League—Korean Series: Kia Tigers
- Nippon Professional Baseball—Japan Series: Yokohama DeNA BayStars
- Mexican League: Diablos Rojos del México
- Spanish League: Astros Valencia
- Swedish League: Rättvik Butchers
- Taiwan League—Taiwan Series: CTBC Brothers

=== Winter leagues ===
- Australian Baseball League: Adelaide Giants
- Colombian League: Caimanes de Barranquilla
- Cuban Elite League: Cocodrilos de Matanzas
- Dominican League: Tigres del Licey
- Mexican Pacific League: Naranjeros de Hermosillo
- Nicaraguan League: Gigantes de Rivas
- Panamanian League: Federales de Chiriquí
- Puerto Rican League: Criollos de Caguas
- Venezuelan League: Tiburones de La Guaira

== Events ==
=== January ===
- January 23: The results of the Baseball Writers' Association of America's voting for the 2024 Hall of Fame induction class were announced. Adrián Beltré, Joe Mauer, and Todd Helton were the candidates elected.
- January 27: Baseball Writers' Association Dinner
- January 29–31: 2024 KBO League season spring training begins for most teams.

=== February ===
- February 1: 2024 KBO League season spring training begins for the KT Wiz and the Samsung Lions.
- February 14: Pitchers and Catchers report to spring training
- February 16: 2024 NCAA Division I baseball season begins
- February 19: Spring Training begins for other MLB Players
- February 23: Spring Training begins for a few teams
- February 24: Spring Training begins for all teams

=== March ===
- March 2–7: 2024 KBO League season spring training ends for all teams.
- March 9: 2024 KBO League preseason begins
- March 9–10 Boston Red Sox vs. Tampa Bay Rays in Santo Domingo, Dominican Republic during spring training. The Red Sox won both games against the Rays, 4–0 in the first game, and 7–6 in the second game.
- March 14–17: MLB Spring Breakout: All 30 teams' prospects face off against each other during Spring Training.
- March 19: 2024 KBO League season preseason ends
- March 20–21: The 2024 Major League Baseball season began in Seoul, South Korea with the Los Angeles Dodgers facing the San Diego Padres in the first regular season game in South Korea. The Dodgers defeated the Padres in the first game, 5–2, while the Padres defeated the Dodgers in the second game, 15–11.
- March 23: 2024 KBO League regular season begins
- March 26: Spring Training Ends
- March 28:
  - 2024 Major League Baseball season begins for 24 of 30 MLB teams.
  - Tampa Bay Rays shortstop, Wander Franco will be placed on administrative leave thru June 1. Franco had not played with the Rays since August 13, 2023.
  - The Arizona Diamondbacks scored 14 runs in the third inning against the Colorado Rockies in a 16–1 final, setting a franchise record for most runs scored in a single inning.
  - Tyler O'Neill of the Boston Red Sox set a Major League record for most consecutive home runs with five. Hitting one off of Seattle Mariners reliever Cody Bolton.
- March 29:
  - Atlanta Braves, Milwaukee Brewers, New York Mets, and Philadelphia Phillies begin their seasons due to the Mets and Phillies home openers postponed from March 28 due to inclement weather.
  - The 2024 Nippon Professional Baseball season begins

=== April ===
- April 1: Houston Astros pitcher Ronel Blanco throws a no-hitter against the Toronto Blue Jays in Minute Maid Park. It was the first no-hitter of the 2024 season, the earliest no-hitter in MLB history, Blanco's first career no-hitter, and the 17th no-hitter in franchise history. His only baserunner was former Astro George Springer, which he allowed two walks. Additionally, this was also the Astros first win of 2024 and Joe Espada first managerial win.
- April 4
  - Opening Day for all minor league teams.
  - The Athletics announced an agreement that will temporarily move to West Sacramento, California at Sutter Health Park, the home of the Sacramento River Cats, from 2025 to 2027 until the franchise move to Las Vegas in 2028, after 57 seasons in Oakland and the Oakland Coliseum.
- April 10: Baltimore Orioles top prospect Jackson Holliday made his Major League debut against the Boston Red Sox at Fenway Park. Holliday wears the Number 7 on his jersey, which had not been used since Cal Ripken Sr.'s death in 1999. Holliday went 0-for-4 but recorded his first RBI.
- April 15: Jackie Robinson Day
- April 21: At Dodger Stadium against the New York Mets, Shohei Ohtani of the Los Angeles Dodgers hits his 176th career MLB home run, passing Hideki Matsui for the most home runs by a Japanese born player.
- April 27–28: Houston Astros vs Colorado Rockies in Mexico City, Mexico

=== May ===
- May 12: Mother's Day
- May 27: Memorial Day

=== June ===
- June 8–9: Philadelphia Phillies vs New York Mets in London, England
- June 14–24: The 2024 Men's College World Series takes place in Omaha, Nebraska
- June 16: Father's Day
- June 20: St. Louis Cardinals vs San Francisco Giants at Rickwood Field in Birmingham, Alabama

=== July ===
- July 4: Independence Day (US)
- July 6: 2024 KBO All-Star Game at Incheon, South Korea
- July 7–8: 2024 KBO League season break
- July 16: 2024 MLB All-Star Game in Arlington, Texas
- July 28: Induction Ceremonies for the National Baseball Hall of Fame and Museum in Cooperstown, New York
- July 30: (6 p.m. ET) Trading Deadline

=== August ===
- August 14–25: The 2024 Little League World Series will be held at Williamsport, Pennsylvania
- August 31: MLB's Postseason-eligible deadline for players acquired via waiver claim

=== September ===
- September 1: MLB active rosters expand from 26 to 28 players
- September 2: Labor Day
- September 15: Roberto Clemente Day
- September 29: End of the Major League Baseball season

=== October ===
October 1: 2024 KBO League regular season ends

==== KBO Postseason ====
October 2: 2024 KBO League postseason begins

- October 2: Wild Card Game begins
- October 5: Semi-playoff begins
- Playoff begins
- October 21: 2024 Korean Series begins
- October 28: The Kia Tigers win the Korean Series 4–1 (12).

==== MLB Postseason ====
- October 1: American League Wild Card Series And National League Wild Card Series begins
- October 5: American League Division Series and National League Division Series begins
- October 13: National League Championship Series Begins
- October 14: American League Championship Series Begins
- October 25: 2024 World Series begins
- October 30: The Los Angeles Dodgers defeat the New York Yankees 4–1, winning their eighth World Series championship in franchise history.
- Immediately after World Series: Eligible players become free agents

=== November ===
- Second day After World Series: Trading Window Opens
- Fifth day after the end of the world series: Deadline for clubs to make qualifying offers to their eligible players who become free agents
- Sixth day after the end of the world series: First Day of free agents may sign contracts with a club other than a former club
- 12th day after the end of the world series: Last Day for article xx (B) free agents to accept a qualifying offer from a former club (Midnight ET.)

=== December ===
- December 2–5: Winter Meetings
- December 5: Rule 5 Draft

== Deaths ==
=== January ===
- January 3 – Billy Gardner, 96, played 10 MLB seasons for six teams from 1954 to 1963 beginning with the Giants, Orioles, Senators, Twins, NY Yankees and finished his career in 1963 with the Red Sox. He also managed for six seasons for two teams beginning with the Twins from 1981 to 1985 and the Royals in 1987.
- January 11 – Bud Harrelson, 79, played 16 MLB seasons with the New York Mets, Philadelphia Phillies and Texas Rangers from 1965 to 1980. Served as a coach and later manager with the Mets for two seasons in 1990 and 1991.
- January 19 – Red Swanson, 87, played 43 games (42 as a pitcher) from 1955 to 1957 with the Pittsburgh Pirates.
- January 21 – Steve Staggs, 72, played with the Toronto Blue Jays and Oakland Athletics in 1977 and 1978.
- January 22 – Don Lassetter, 90, played four games with the St. Louis Cardinals before spending the rest of his career in the minor leagues.
- January 26 – Jimy Williams, 80, played with the St. Louis Cardinals in 1966 and 1967. He later served as manager with the Toronto Blue Jays from 1986 to 1989, Boston Red Sox from 1997 to 2001, and Houston Astros from 2002 to 2004.
- January 31
  - Al McBean, 85, played ten MLB seasons with the Pittsburgh Pirates, San Diego Padres, and Los Angeles Dodgers from 1961 to 1970 as a pitcher.
  - John Pregenzer, 91, played two seasons with the San Francisco Giants in 1963 and 1964.

=== February ===
- February 1 – Mike Martin, 79, served as baseball coach for the Florida State Seminoles for 40 seasons from 1980 to 2019. He was inducted into the College Baseball Hall of Fame in the same year
- February 3 – Bill Lachemann, 89, served as a bullpen coach for the California Angels in 1995 and 1996.
- February 4 – Brant Alyea, 83, played six MLB seasons with the Washington Senators, Minnesota Twins, Oakland Athletics, and St. Louis Cardinals from 1965 to 1972. In 1965, he became the ninth player in MLB history to hit a home run on his first MLB pitch.
- February 7 – Carl Iwasaki, 62, served as a baseball coach for the Austin Kangaroos from 2005 to 2010, and the Northern Colorado Bears from 2011 to 2022.
- February 9 – Jim Hannan, 84, played ten MLB seasons with the Washington Senators, Detroit Tigers, and Milwaukee Brewers from 1962 to 1971. He co-founded with the Major League Baseball Players Alumni Association (MLBPAA) and served as its first president from 1982 to 1986.
- February 14 – Don Gullett, 73, played nine MLB seasons with the Cincinnati Reds and the New York Yankees from 1970 to 1978. He won three World Series championships with the Reds in 1975 and 1976, and the Yankees in 1977.
- February 15 – Tom Qualters, 88, played as a pitcher for the Philadelphia Phillies and Chicago White Sox in 1953, 1957, and 1958.
- February 16 – Joe Hindelang, 78, worked as a baseball coach for USciences, Lafayette, and Penn State from 1978 to 2004.
- February 20 – Larry Demery, 67, played as a pitcher for the Pittsburgh Pirates from 1974 to 1977.
- February 24 – John Oldham, 91 played as a pinch runner with the Cincinnati Redlegs in 1956, though he played as a pitcher through his entire career. He later served as a baseball head coach for Campbell High School, Westmont High School, San Jose City College, and Santa Clara University from 1960 to 1997.
- February 25 – José DeLeón, 63, a Dominican pitcher played 13 seasons with the Pittsburgh Pirates, Chicago White Sox, St. Louis Cardinals, Philadelphia Phillies, and Montreal Expos from 1983 to 1995. DeLeón led the National League in strikeouts in 1989 with 201.
- February 28 – Héctor Ortiz, 54, played four seasons with the Kansas City Royals and Texas Rangers from 1998 to 2002 before serving as first base, and bullpen coach for the Rangers from 2015 to 2020.

=== March ===
- March 3 – U.L. Washington, 70, an American shortstop who played 11 Major League seasons for three teams from 1977–87. Started his major league career in 1977 with the Kansas City Royals, and later in 1985 with the Montreal Expos and finished his career in 1987 with the Pittsburgh Pirates before retiring in 1988.
- March 3 – Ed Ott, 72, an American catcher played eight seasons with the Pittsburgh Pirates and California Angels from 1974 to 1981. Ott won a World Series championship with the Pirates in 1979.
- March 12 – Bill Plummer, 76, an American catcher played 11 seasons with the Chicago Cubs, Cincinnati Reds, and Seattle Mariners from 1968 to 1978. Plummer later served as coach and manager for the Mariners in 1982 to 1983, and from 1988 to 1992 and for the Rockies in 1993 and 1994. Plummer won two World Series championships with the Reds in 1975 and 1976.
- March 14 – Mike Lude, 101, served as a baseball coach for the Maine Black Bears, in 1950 and 1951. Lude would later serve as a football coach for the Colorado State Rams from 1962 to 1969.
- March 14 – Jim McAndrew, 80, an American pitcher played seven seasons with the New York Mets and San Diego Padres from 1968 to 1974. McAndrew won a World Series championship with the Mets in 1969.
- March 22 – Chuck Seelbach, 76, an American pitcher played four seasons with the Detroit Tigers from 1971 to 1974.
- March 23 – Peter Angelos, 94, American lawyer and baseball executive, owner of the Baltimore Orioles from 1993 to 2023.

=== April ===
- April 1 – Pete Wilk, 58, served as baseball coach for the Georgetown Hoyas baseball team from 2000 to 2020 before serving as manager for the Vermont Lake Monsters in 2021 and 2022.
- April 2 – Kevin Batiste, 57, played six games with the Toronto Blue Jays in June 1989.
- April 2 – Larry Lucchino, 78, served as baseball executive for the Baltimore Orioles from 1988 to 1993, the San Diego Padres from 1995 to 2001, and the Boston Red Sox from 2002 to 2015. Lucchino had won four World Series championships with the Orioles in 1983 and the Red Sox in 2004, 2007, and 2013.
- April 4 – Pat Zachry, 71, played ten MLB seasons as a pitcher with the Cincinnati Reds in 1976 and 1977, New York Mets from 1977 to 1982, Los Angeles Dodgers in 1983 and 1984, and the Philadelphia Phillies in 1985. Zachry was named an MLB All-Star, won National League Rookie of the Year Award, and won a World Series championship with the Reds in 1976.
- April 5 – Toni Palermo, 91, played with the All-American Girls Professional Baseball League (AAGPBL) in 1949 and 1950.
- April 7 – Jerry Grote, 81, played 16 MLB seasons with the Houston Colt .45s in 1963 and 1964, the New York Mets from 1966 to 1977, the Los Angeles Dodgers in 1977 and 1978, the Kansas City Royals in 1981 and the Los Angeles Dodgers again in the same year. Grote briefly retired from professional baseball after the 1978 season, but came back in 1981. Grote made two All-Star appearances in 1968 and 1974 and won a World Series championship in 1969 with the Mets.
- April 13 – Larry Brown, 84, played as an infielder for the Cleveland Indians from 1963 to 1971, the Oakland Athletics in 1971 and 1972, the Baltimore Orioles in 1973, and the Texas Rangers in 1974.
- April 14 – Ken Holtzman, 78, played as a pitcher for the Chicago Cubs from 1965 to 1971, the Oakland Athletics from 1972 to 1975, the Baltimore Orioles in 1976, the New York Yankees from 1976 to 1978, and his second stint with the Cubs from 1978 to 1979. Holtzman was named an All-Star in 1972 and 1973, won three World Series championships with the Athletics from 1972 to 1974, and pitched two no-hitters, the first on August 19, 1969 against the Atlanta Braves at Wrigley Field and the second on June 3, 1971 against the Cincinnati Reds at Riverfront Stadium.
- April 15 – Whitey Herzog, 92, served as manager for the Texas Rangers in 1973, the California Angels in 1974, the Kansas City Royals from 1975 to 1979, and the St. Louis Cardinals from 1980 to 1990. During his stint with the Cardinals, Herzog won a World Series championship in 1982 and was named National League Manager of the Year in 1985. Herzog was elected into the National Baseball Hall of Fame in 2010 via the Veterans Committee.
- April 16 – Carl Erskine, 97, played as a pitcher with the Brooklyn/Los Angeles Dodgers from 1948 to 1959. Erskine was named an All Star in 1954 and won a World Series championship in 1955. Erskine also pitched two no-htters in 1952 against the Chicago Cubs and in 1955 against the New York Giants.
- April 19 – David McCarty, 54, played as a first baseman and outfielder for the Minnesota Twins from 1993 to 1995, the San Francisco Giants in 1995 and 1996, the Seattle Mariners in 1998, the Kansas City Royals from 2000 to 2002, the Tampa Bay Devil Rays in 2002, the Oakland Athletics in 2003, and the Boston Red Sox from 2003 to 2005. McCarty won a World Series championship with the Red Sox in 2004.

=== May ===
- May 1 – Joe Shipley, 88, former relief pitcher for the San Francisco Giants from 1958–1960 and Chicago White Sox in 1963.
- May 9

- Sean Burroughs, 43, third baseman for the San Diego Padres, Tampa Bay Devil Rays, Arizona Diamondbacks and Milwaukee Brewers from 2002–2006 and 2011–2012, son of former player Jeff Burroughs.
- Buzz Stephen, 79, former pitcher for the Minnesota Twins during the 1968 season.

=== June ===
- June 15 – Mike Brumley, 61, played as a shortstop for the Chicago Cubs, Detroit Tigers, Seattle Mariners, Boston Red Sox, Houston Astros, and Oakland Athletics from 1987 to 1995. Brumley would also coached for Mariners from 2010 to 2013, and the Cubs in 2014.
- June 18 – Willie Mays, 93, played as an outfielder for the Birmingham Black Barons of the Negro leagues in 1948, before playing with the New York/San Francisco Giants from 1951 to 1972 and the New York Mets in 1972 and 1973. Throughout his career, Mays made 24 consecutive All-Star appearances from 1954 to 1973, won National League Rookie of the Year in 1951, a World Series championship in 1954, won two NL MVP Awards in 1954 and 1965, and won 12 Gold Glove awards. Mays was well known for making an over-the-shoulder catch in the 1954 World Series, also known as The Catch. Mays was elected into the National Baseball Hall of Fame in 1979.
- June 28 – Orlando Cepeda, 86, played as a first baseman for the San Francisco Giants, St. Louis Cardinals, Atlanta Braves, Oakland Athletics, Boston Red Sox, and Kansas City Royals from 1958 to 1974. Cepeda made 11 All-Star appearances, won Rookie of the Year in 1961, won an MVP and World Series championship in 1967. Cepeda was elected into the National Baseball Hall of Fame in 1999.

=== July ===
- July 6 – Jimmy Hurst, 52, played as an outfielder for the Detroit Tigers in 1997 and the Hiroshima Toyo Carp in 2003.
- July 17 – Jerry Walker, 85, played as a pitcher for the Baltimore Orioles, Kansas City Athletics, and the Cleveland Indians from 1957 to 1964. At age 20, Walker became the youngest pitcher to start the All-Star Game in 1959.
- July 24 – Denny Lemaster, 85, former pitcher for the Milwaukee and Atlanta Braves, Houston Astros and Montreal Expos from 1962–1972 and 1967 Major League Baseball All-Star Game member.
- July 28 – Reyes Moronta, 31, former relief pitcher for the San Francisco Giants, Los Angeles Dodgers, Arizona Diamondbacks and Los Angeles Angels from 2017–2023.

=== August ===
- August 6 – Billy Bean, 60, openly gay former outfielder for the Detroit Tigers, Los Angeles Dodgers, San Diego Padres, and Kintetsu Buffaloes from 1987–1995. Bean served as Major League Baseball's Senior Vice President of Diversity, Equity and Inclusion.

=== September ===
- September 8 – Ed Kranepool, 79, infielder who spent his entire career with the New York Mets from 1962–1979. Kranepool was also a member of the New York Mets Hall of Fame, inducted in 1990.
- September 29 – Ozzie Virgil Sr., 92, utility infielder for the New York and San Francisco Giants, Detroit Tigers, Kansas City Athletics, Baltimore Orioles and Pittsburgh Pirates from 1956–1969 and the first player born in the Dominican Republic to play in Major League Baseball.
- September 30 – Pete Rose, 83, outfielder and infielder for the Cincinnati Reds, Philadelphia Phillies, and Montreal Expos from 1963–1986. Also managed the Reds from 1984–1989. Rose is the all-time hits leader in MLB, made 17 All-Star appearances, won Rookie of the Year in 1963, MVP in 1973, won the National League batting title three times, and a three-time World Series champion. He was inducted into the Cincinnati Reds Hall of Fame in 2016.

=== October ===
- October 8 – Luis Tiant, 83, pitcher for the Cleveland Indians, Minnesota Twins, Boston Red Sox, New York Yankees, Pittsburgh Pirates, and California Angels from 1964–1982. Tiant made three All-Star appearances and led the American League in ERA twice. He was inducted into the Boston Red Sox Hall of Fame in 1990, and the Venezuelan Baseball Hall of Fame in 2009.
- October 9 – Rudy May, 80, left-handed starting pitcher for the California Angels, New York Yankees, Baltimore Orioles and Montreal Expos from 1965–1983.
- October 22 – Fernando Valenzuela, 63, pitcher for the Los Angeles Dodgers, California Angels, Baltimore Orioles, Philadelphia Phillies, San Diego Padres, and St. Louis Cardinals from 1980–1997. Valenzuela made six All-Star appearances and won a Cy Young, Rookie of the Year, and World Series with the Dodgers all in 1981. He was inducted into the Mexican Professional Baseball Hall of Fame in 2024, and his number 34 was retired by the Dodgers in 2023.

=== November ===
- November 23 – Rico Carty, 85, left fielder from 1963–1979 and the batting champion for the National League in 1970, his solo All-Star season. Carty was also a member of the Ivan Allen Jr. Braves Museum and Hall of Fame.

=== December ===
- December 4 – Al Fitzmorris, 78, right-handed starting pitcher and member of the 1969 Kansas City Royals, the inaugural season. Fitzmorris pitched for the Royals from 1969–1976, the Cleveland Indians from 1977–1978 and the California Angels in 1978.
- December 5 – Bill Melton, 79, third baseman for the Chicago White Sox, California Angels and Cleveland Indians from 1968–1977, and All-Star in 1971, the year he led the American League in home runs. Melton held the franchise record for home runs until being surpassed by Harold Baines in 1987 and worked as a White Sox broadcaster from 1998–2020.
- December 7 – Merv Rettenmund, 81, outfielder for the Baltimore Orioles, Cincinnati Reds, San Diego Padres and California Angels from 1968–1980 and three-time World Series champion. He also served as a coach for several teams from 1983–2007.
- December 10 – Rocky Colavito, 91, outfielder for the Cleveland Indians, Detroit Tigers, Kansas City Athletics, Chicago White Sox, Los Angeles Dodgers and New York Yankees from 1955–1968. A nine-time All-Star, Colavito led the American League in home runs in 1959 and runs batted in in 1965. Colavito later served as a broadcaster and a coach.
- December 20 – Rickey Henderson, 65, outfielder for the Oakland Athletics, New York Yankees, Toronto Blue Jays, San Diego Padres, Anaheim Angels, New York Mets, Seattle Mariners, Boston Red Sox, and Los Angeles Dodgers from 1979 to 2003. Henderson made 10 All-Star appearances, won MVP in 1990, won two World Series championships in 1989 and 1993, and set MLB's career stolen bases record. Henderson was elected into the National Baseball Hall of Fame in 2009.
- December 27 – Charlie Maxwell, 97, outfielder for the Boston Red Sox, Baltimore Orioles, Detroit Tigers and Chicago White Sox from 1950–1964 and two-time All-Star (1956 and 1957). Nicknamed "Sunday Charlie", Maxwell was known for hitting home runs on Sundays.
- December 29 – Jim Campbell, 81, player who appeared in 13 games exclusively as a pinch hitter for the St. Louis Cardinals in 1970.

== See also ==
- 2024 KBO League season
- 2024 Nippon Professional Baseball season
- 2024 Major League Baseball season
