= Kim Jae-yoon =

South Korean baseball player (born 1990)

Samsung Lions – No. 62
- Pitcher
- Born: September 16, 1990 (age 36); Seoul, South Korea
- Bats: Right Throws: Right

KBO debut
- May 17, 2015, for the KT Wiz

KBO statistics (through 2025)
- Win–loss record: 52-48
- Earned Run Average: 3.77
- Strikeouts: 636
- Saves: 193
- Stats at Baseball Reference

Teams
- KT Wiz (2015–2023); Samsung Lions (2024–present)

Career highlights and awards
- Korean Series champion (2021); KBO Awards - Save Award (2026)

Kim Jae-yoon (Korean: 김재윤; Hanja: 金載潤; born September 16, 1990) is a South Korean professional baseball relief pitcher for the Samsung Lions of the KBO League. He has previously played for the KT Wiz.

== Professional career ==
=== Minor leagues ===
After graduating from Whimoon High School, Kim went undrafted and signed with the Arizona Diamondbacks, signing for a $150,000 signing bonus. He played in the team's minor leagues until being released in 2012, after which he completed his active military service.

=== KT Wiz ===
After his military service, Kim participated in the overseas player tryouts and was selected by the KT Wiz as a special priority draft pick. After a two-year grace period, he entered the draft and received no signing bonus. Initially a catcher, the Wiz recognized his potential as a pitcher and converted him to that position in 2015. In his debut, he surprised everyone by striking out three consecutive batters. On July 1, 2015, in a game against the SK Wyverns, with one out and the bases loaded, he utilized his signature fastball, which exceeds 150 km/h (93 mph), a fastball, and a slider, striking out two consecutive batters and forcing out a groundout to avoid giving up a run. He continued to throw around 40 pitches, not allowing a single run. He earned the win that day, marking his first win since his debut.

During the 2021 season, the KT Wiz became regular season champions after defeating the Samsung Lions in an additional tiebreaker and advanced directly to the Korean Series, in which the team won, with Kim himself winning his first (and so far only) Korean Series and posted three saves there.

=== Samsung Lions ===
Kim became a free agent after the 2023 season and signed with the Samsung Lions on a four-year, total contract worth up to 5.8 billion won (2 billion won signing bonus, 2.8 billion won annual salary, and 1 billion won in incentives) on November 22, 2023.

By the end of 2025 season, Kim became the leading active KBO League pitcher with the most saves following the retirement of former teammate Oh Seung-hwan.
