= Yonathan Perlaza =

Venezuelan baseball player (born 1998)

Hanwha Eagles – No. 30
- Outfielder
- Born: November 10, 1998 (age 27); Paramo Tucani, Venezuela
- Bats: Switch Throws: Right

KBO debut
- March 23, 2024, for the Hanwha Eagles

KBO statistics (through August 20, 2026)
- Batting average: .281
- Home runs: 44
- Runs batted in: 135
- Stats at Baseball Reference

Teams
- Hanwha Eagles (2024, 2026–present)

Yonathan Jesús Perlaza (born November 10, 1998) is a Venezuelan professional baseball outfielder for the Hanwha Eagles of the KBO League.

== Career ==
=== Chicago Cubs ===
Perlaza signed with the Chicago Cubs as an international free agent on August 26, 2015. He made his professional debut in 2016 with the Dominican Summer League Cubs, hitting .256 with three home runs, 18 RBI, and 17 stolen bases in 60 games. Perlaza spent the 2017 season with the rookie–level Arizona League Cubs, playing in 25 games and hitting .235/.278/.314 with six RBI and four stolen bases. He returned to the AZL Cubs in 2018, hitting .317/.365/.404 with one home run and 26 RBI.

Perlaza split the 2019 campaign between the Low–A Eugene Emeralds and Single–A South Bend Cubs, accumulating a .268/.333/.388 batting line with two home runs, 20 RBI, and five stolen bases across 52 games. He did not play in a game in 2020 due to the cancellation of the minor league season because of the COVID-19 pandemic.

Perlaza returned to action in 2021 with South Bend, playing in 99 contests and hitting .280/.350/.479 with 15 home runs and 64 RBI. He spent the 2022 season with the Double–A Tennessee Smokies. In 124 games for Tennessee, Perlaza hit .255/.358/.492 with career–highs in home runs (23), RBI (73), and stolen bases (15).

Perlaza played the entirety of the 2023 campaign with the Triple–A Iowa Cubs, appearing in 121 games and batting .284/.389/.534 with 23 home runs, a career–high 85 RBI, and 13 stolen bases. He elected free agency following the season on November 6, 2023.

=== Hanwha Eagles ===
On November 20, 2023, Perlaza signed with the Hanwha Eagles of the KBO League. In 122 games, he slashed .275/.364/.486 with 24 home runs and 70 RBI. On November 30, 2024, the Eagles non–tendered Perlaza, making him a free agent.

=== San Diego Padres ===
On December 4, 2024, Perlaza signed a minor league contract with the San Diego Padres. He made 138 appearances for the Triple-A El Paso Chihuahuas in 2025, slashing .307/.391/.510 with 19 home runs, 113 RBI, and 15 stolen bases. Perlaza elected free agency following the season on November 6, 2025.

=== Hanwha Eagles (second stint) ===
On November 29, 2025, Perlaza signed a one-year, $750,000 contract with the Hanwha Eagles of the KBO League.
