= Park Kyung-su =

South Korean baseball player

KT Wiz – No. 73
- Second baseman / Coach
- Born: March 31, 1984 (age 42); Seoul, South Korea
- Bats: Right Throws: Right

KBO debut
- April 6, 2003, for the LG Twins

KBO statistics (through April 2, 2024)
- Batting average: .249
- Home runs: 161
- Runs batted in: 719
- Stats at Baseball Reference

Teams
- As player: LG Twins (2003–{2014); KT Wiz (2015–2024); As coach: KT Wiz (2025–present)

Career highlights and awards
- Korean Series Most Valuable Player Award (2021)

- Korean name
- Hangul: 박경수
- Hanja: 朴慶洙
- RR: Bak Gyeongsu
- MR: Pak Kyŏngsu

Park Kyung-su (Korean: 박경수; born March 31, 1984) is an infielder of KT Wiz of the KBO League. He graduated from Sungnam High School. He joined the LG Twins in 2003, and in 2014 he transferred to KT Wiz. He made his 100th home run in 2017 in a game against LG Twins.

In 2019, KBO's first second baseman hit double-digit home runs for the fifth consecutive year. He won the Korean Series Most Valuable Player Award for the 2021 Korean Series.

On October 18, 2024, Park Kyung-su, former Korean Series MVP for the KT Wiz, announced his retirement at age 40.
