= Sebastián Elizalde =

Mexican baseball player (born 1991)

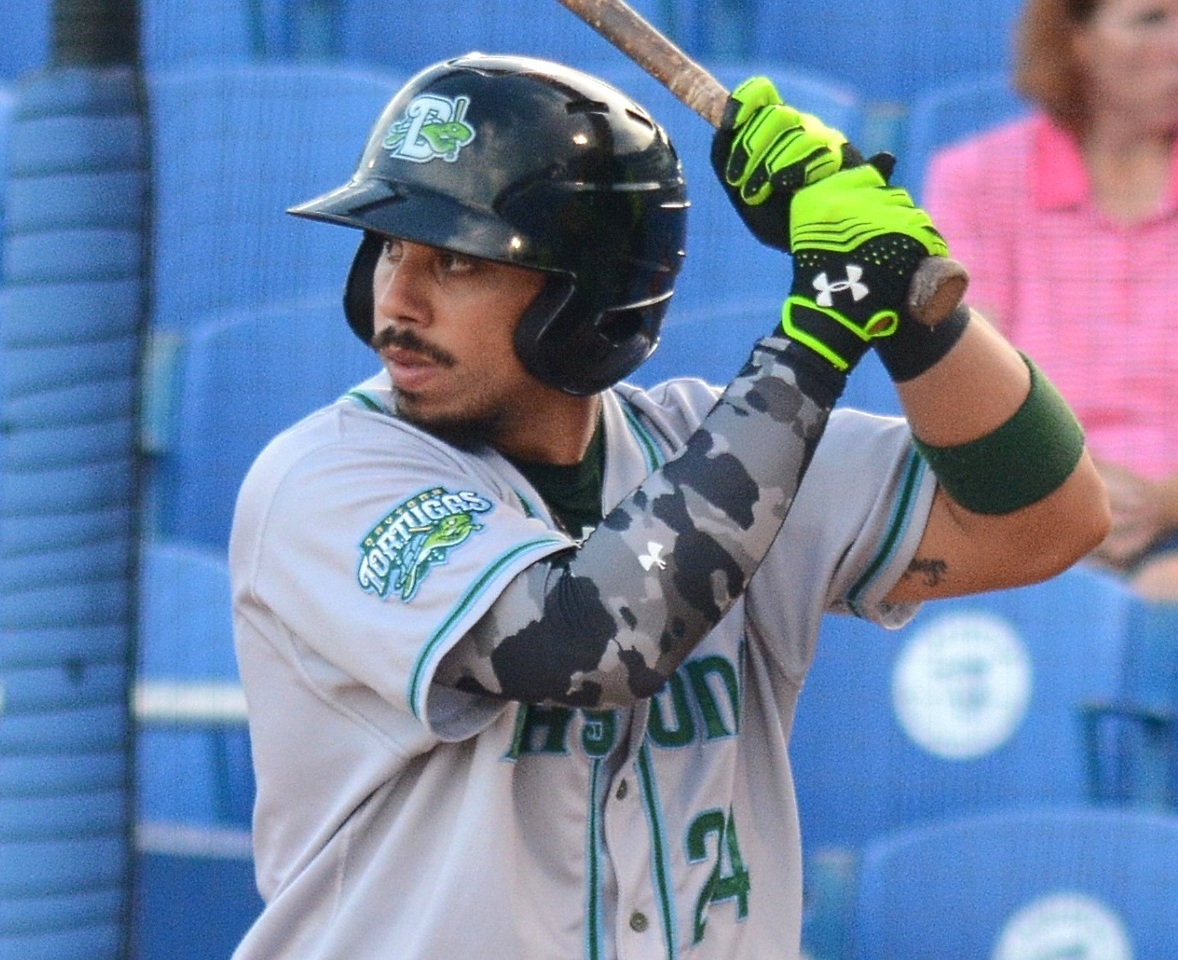
- Elizalde with the Daytona Tortugas in 2015

Pericos de Puebla – No. 50
- Outfielder
- Born: November 20, 1991 (age 34); Guaymas, Sonora, Mexico
- Bats: Left Throws: Right
- Stats at Baseball Reference

Sebastián Elizalde (born November 20, 1991) is a Mexican professional baseball outfielder for the Pericos de Puebla of the Mexican League and the Tomateros de Culiacán of the Mexican Pacific League.

== Career ==
=== Sultanes de Monterrey ===
On April 24, 2010, Elizalde signed with the Sultanes de Monterrey of the Mexican League. Elizalde played with Monterrey through the 2013 season

=== Cincinnati Reds ===
On May 7, 2013, Elizalde signed minor league contract with Cincinnati Reds. In 2014, Elizalde split time between the Single-A Dayton Dragons and the advanced Single-A Bakersfield Blaze, hitting a combined .289 and an OPS of .380 with 16 home runs and 60 walks. He spent the 2015 season with the advanced Single-A Daytona Tortugas and the 2016 season with the Double-A Pensacola Blue Wahoos. Elizalde began the 2017 season as the Triple-A Louisville Bats everyday first baseman.

=== Sultanes de Monterrey (second stint) ===
On May 3, 2018, Elizalde was loaned to the Sultanes de Monterrey of the Mexican League.

=== Cincinnati Reds (second stint) ===
On January 10, 2019, Elizalde signed a minor league contract with the Cincinnati Reds organization.

=== Sultanes de Monterrey (third stint) ===
On June 21, 2019, Elizalde was loaned to the Sultanes de Monterrey. He finished the season in Monterrey slashing .313/.389/.414 in 39 contests. After the 2019 season, he played for Tomateros de Culiacán of the Mexican Pacific League (LMP). He has also played for Mexico in the 2020 Caribbean Series.

=== New York Mets ===
On February 3, 2020, Elizalde signed minor league contract with New York Mets. He did not play in a game in 2020 due to the cancellation of the minor league season because of the COVID-19 pandemic. On May 28, Elizalde released by Mets organization.

After the 2020 season, he played for Tomateros of the LMP. Elizalde enjoyed a great season slashing .282/.344/.553 and was awarded the Mexican Pacific League MVP. He also played for Mexico in the 2021 Caribbean Series.

On March 11, 2021, Elizalde re-signed with the Mets on a minor league contract. After hitting .286 in 9 games with the Double–A Binghamton Rumble Ponies, he was promoted to the Triple–A Syracuse Mets, where he batted .186 with one home run, six RBI, and six stolen bases across 23 contests. Elizalde was released by the organization on June 18.

=== Sultanes de Monterrey (fourth stint) ===
On June 18, 2021, Elizalde signed with the Sultanes de Monterrey of the Mexican League.

In 2023, Elizalde played in 86 games, hitting .305/.408/.484 with 11 home runs, 49 RBI, and 18 stolen bases.

=== Dorados de Chihuahua ===
On February 27, 2024, Elizalde was loaned to the Dorados de Chihuahua of the Mexican League. In 65 games, he batted .318/.385/.465 with six home runs and 35 RBI.

=== Sultanes de Monterrey (fifth stint) ===
On July 1, 2024, Elizalde was returned to the Sultanes de Monterrey of the Mexican League. He played in 21 games down the stretch for Monterrey, hitting .310/.389/.452 with two home runs, nine RBI, and six stolen bases.

Elizalde made 33 appearances for the Sultanes during the 2025 season, slashing .222/.287/.343 with one home run, 12 RBI, and two stolen bases.

=== El Águila de Veracruz ===
On January 9, 2026, Elizalde and Roberto Valenzuela were traded on loan to El Águila de Veracruz in exchange for Socrates Brito. In 78 appearances for Veracruz, he batted .296/.355/.446 with 10 home runs and 43 RBI.

=== Pericos de Puebla ===
On August 4, 2026, Elizalde was traded to the Pericos de Puebla of the Mexican League.

== International career ==
Elizalde was chosen for the Mexico national baseball team at the 2017 World Baseball Classic.
