= Kim Sun-bin (baseball) =

South Korean baseball player (born 1989)

Kia Tigers – No. 3
- Shortstop / Second baseman
- Born: December 18, 1989 (age 36); Hwasun, South Jeolla, South Korea
- Bats: Right Throws: Right

KBO debut
- 2008, for the Kia Tigers

KBO statistics (through 2025 season)
- Batting average: .306
- Hits: 1,732
- Home runs: 44
- Runs batted in: 667

Teams
- Kia Tigers (2008–2014, 2016–present)

Career highlights and awards
- KBO batting champion (2017); 2024 Korean Series MVP

- Kim Sun-bin
- Hangul: 김선빈
- Hanja: 金善彬
- RR: Gim Seonbin
- MR: Kim Sŏnbin

Kim Sun-bin (born December 18, 1989) is a South Korean professional baseball infielder for the Kia Tigers of the KBO League.

After 2019 season, he earned FA qualification and stayed at 4 billion KRW in total for four years

Kim became free agent again after 2023 season and signed a three-year, 3 billion KRW contract with the Kia Tigers.
