= Choi Won-joon =

South Korean baseball player (born 1994)

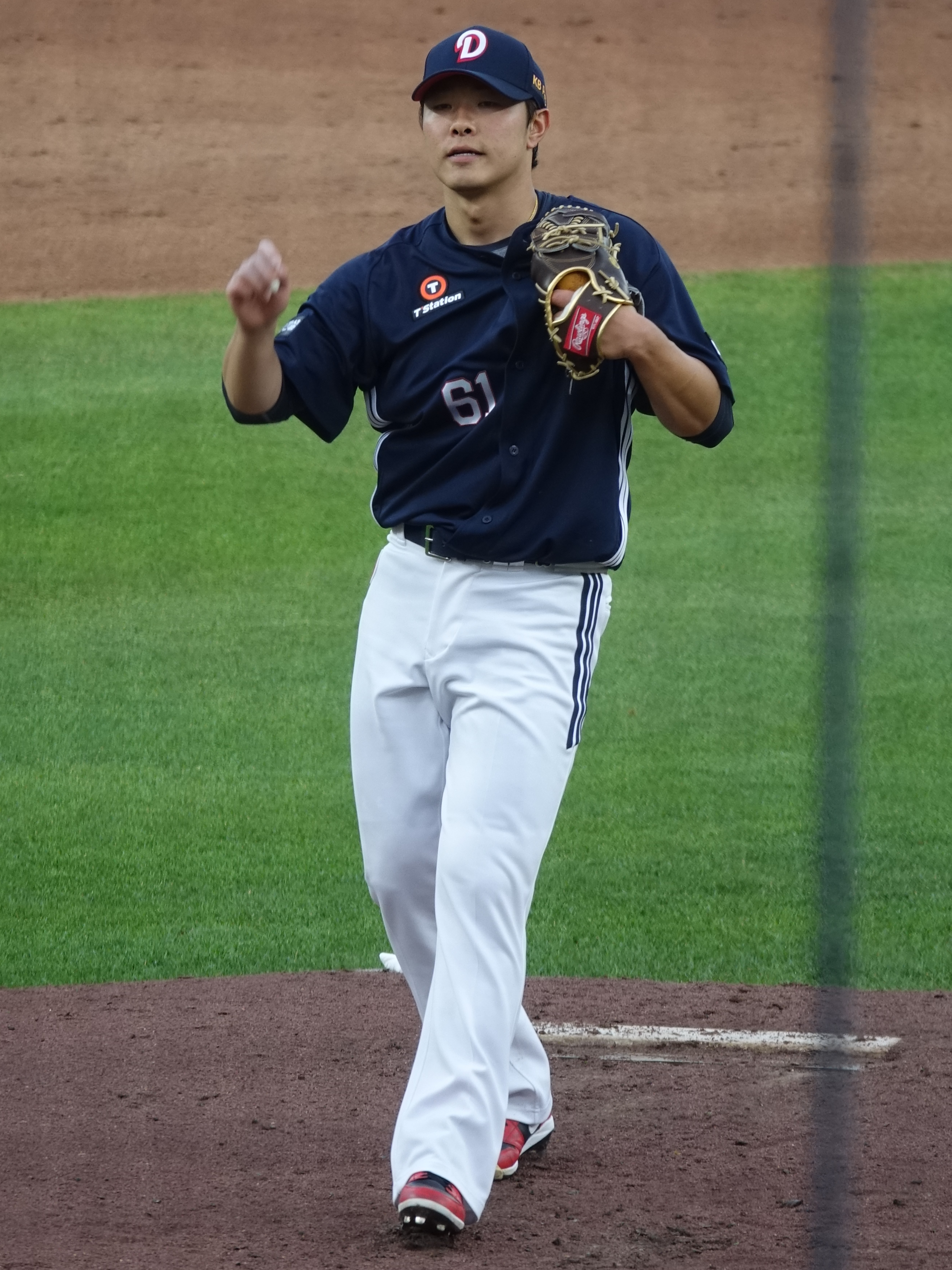

Doosan Bears – No. 61
- Pitcher
- Born: December 21, 1994 (age 31); Seoul, South Korea
- Bats: Right Throws: Right

KBO debut
- July 25, 2018, for the Doosan Bears

KBO statistics (through 2025 season)
- Win–loss record: 44–45
- Earned run average: 4.28
- Strikeouts: 568
- Stats at Baseball Reference

Teams
- Doosan Bears (2018–present)

- Choi Won-joon
- Hangul: 최원준
- RR: Choe Wonjun
- MR: Ch'oe Wŏnjun

Former name
- Hangul: 최동현
- RR: Choe Donghyeon
- MR: Ch'oe Tonghyŏn

Choi Won-joon (Korean: 최원준; born December 21, 1994) is a South Korean professional baseball pitcher currently playing for the Doosan Bears of the KBO League. He competed in the 2020 Summer Olympics.

On November 28, 2025, he signed a remaining contract with Doosan for 3.8 billion won.
