= Gwangju-Kia Champions Field =

Baseball stadium in Gwangju, South Korea

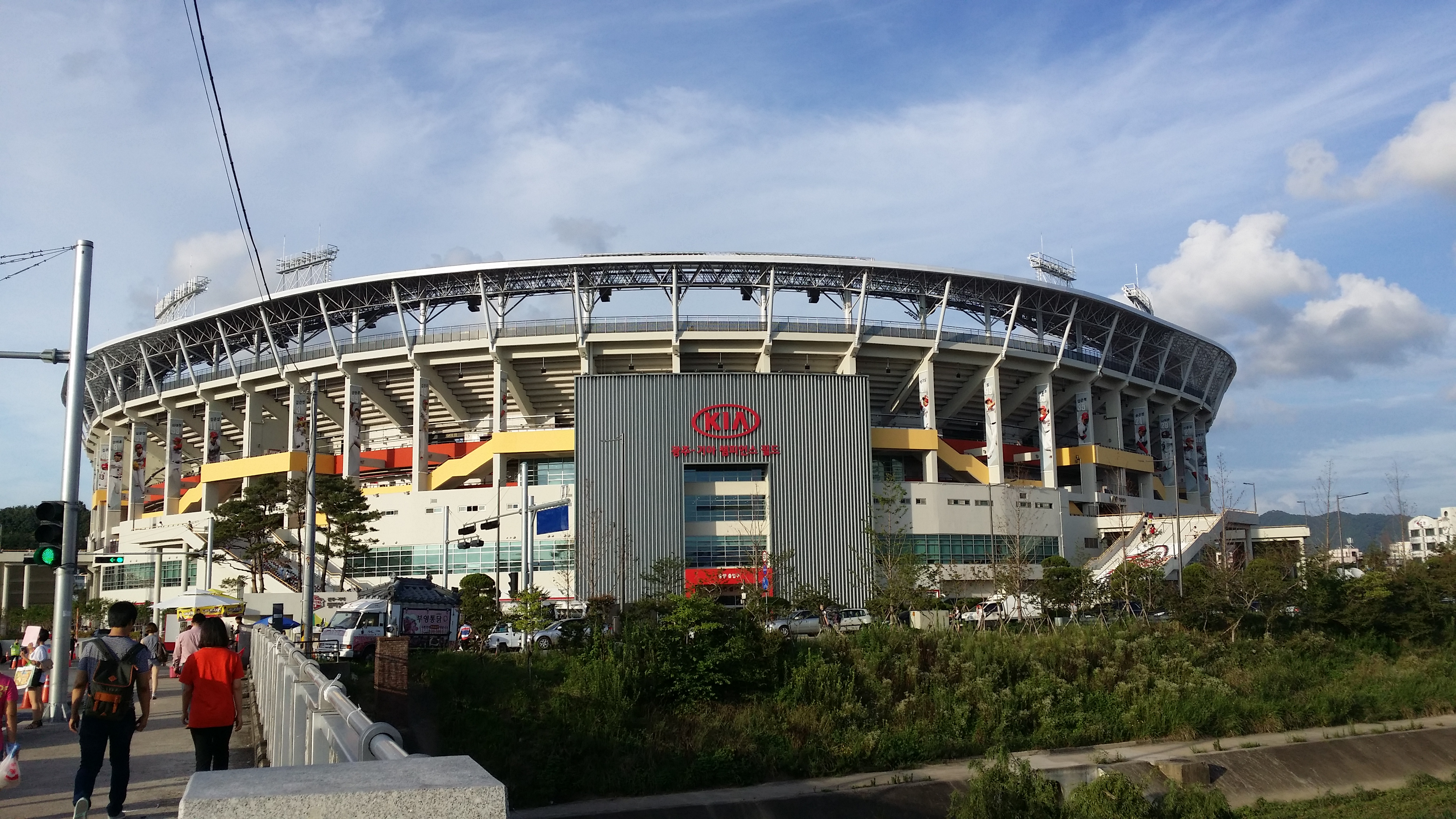
- Interactive map of Gwangju-Kia Champions Field
- Location: 316 Im-dong, Buk-gu, Gwangju, South Korea
- Coordinates: 35°10′05.3″N 126°53′20.8″E
- Owner: City of Gwangju
- Operator: Kia Tigers
- Capacity: 20,500 (seated); 27,000 (total capacity)
- Surface: Grass
- Field size: Left Field – 99 metres (325 ft); Left-Center – 117 metres (384 ft); Center Field – 121 metres (397 ft); Right-Center – 117 metres (384 ft); Right Field – 99 metres (325 ft)

Construction
- Groundbreaking: 24 November 2011
- Built: 2011–2014
- Opened: 8 March 2014
- Cost: 99.4 billion won

Tenant
- Kia Tigers (2014–present)

The Gwangju-Kia Champions Field (Korean: 광주 KIA 챔피언스 필드) is a baseball stadium in Gwangju, South Korea. It has been the home of KBO club Kia Tigers since 2014, replacing Gwangju Mudeung Baseball Stadium.
