= Won Tae-in =

South Korean baseball player (born 2000)

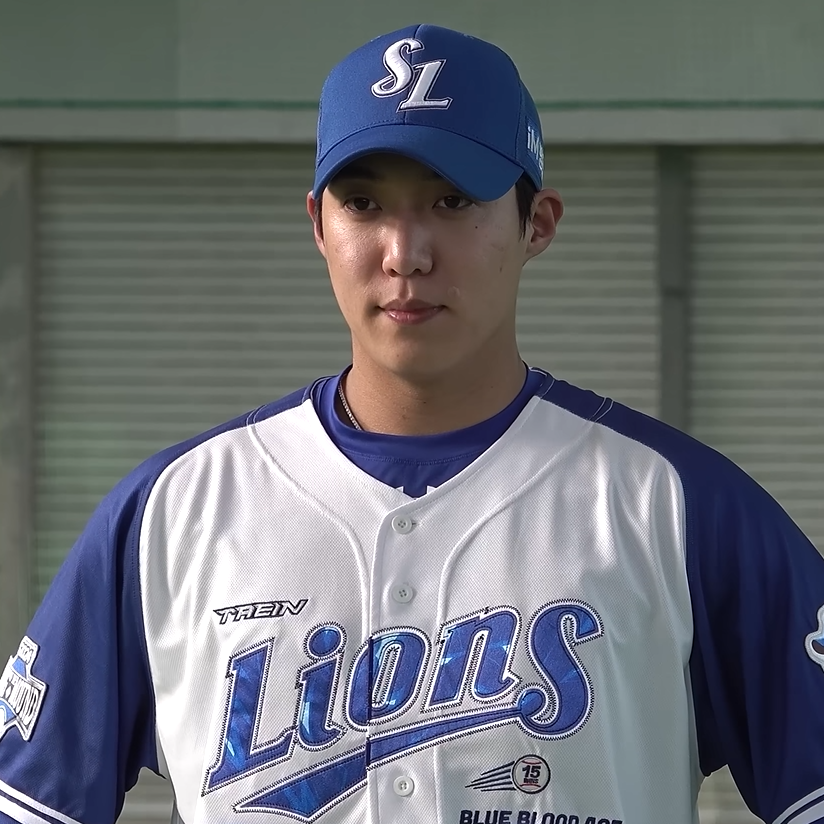
- Won Tae-in in 2025

Free agent
- Pitcher
- Born: April 6, 2000 (age 26); Daegu, South Korea
- Bats: Right Throws: Right

KBO debut
- March 26, 2019, for the Samsung Lions

KBO statistics (through May 18, 2026)
- Win–loss record: 69–53
- Earned run average: 4.08
- Strikeouts: 761
- Stats at Baseball Reference

Teams
- Samsung Lions (2019–present)

Career highlights and awards
- Korean Series champion (2026)

- Won Tae-in
- Hangul: 원태인
- RR: Won Taein
- MR: Wŏn T'aein

Won Tae-in (Korean: 원태인; born April 6, 2000) is a South Korean professional baseball pitcher who is currently a free agent. He competed in the 2020 Summer Olympics, the 2022 Asian Games, and the 2023 World Baseball Classic.
