= 2024 KBO League season =

Professional baseball season in South Korea

2024 KBO League
- Association: KBO
- League: KBO League
- Sport: Baseball
- Defending champions: LG Twins (2023)
- Hosts: Shinhan Bank
- Duration: March 23 – October 1
- Games: 144 per team
- Teams: 10
- Total attendance: 10,731,646
- Average attendance: 15,115
- TV partner(s): KBS, MBC, SBS & SPOTV
- Streaming partner(s): TVING (South Korea); SOOP Live (international)

Regular season
- Season champions: Kia Tigers | 87–55–2 (.613)
- Second place: Samsung Lions | 78–64–2 (.549)
- Third place: LG Twins | 76–66–2 (.535)
- Fourth place: Doosan Bears | 74–68–2 (.521)
- Fifth place: KT Wiz | 72–70–2 (.507)
- Season MVP: Kim Do-yeong (Kia)

Preseason
- First place: Doosan Bears
- Runners-up: LG Twins

All-Star Game
- 2024 KBO All-Stars: Nanum All-Stars
- Runners-up: Dream All-Stars
- Season MVP: Choi Hyoung-woo (Kia)

Postseason
- Wild Card champions: KT Wiz
- Wild Card runners-up: Doosan Bears
- Semi-playoff champions: LG Twins
- Semi-playoff runners-up: KT Wiz
- Playoff champions: Samsung Lions
- Playoff runners-up: LG Twins

Korean Series
- Date: October 21 – 28
- Venue: Gwangju-Kia Champions Field & Daegu Samsung Lions Park
- Champions: Kia Tigers (12th title)
- Runners-up: Samsung Lions
- Finals MVP: Kim Sun-bin (Kia)

KBO League seasons
- ← 2023 2025 →

The 2024 KBO League season, officially known as the 2024 Shinhan SOL Bank KBO League season (Korean: 2024 신한 SOL 뱅크 KBO 리그) for sponsorship reasons, was the 43rd season in the history of the KBO League. The league's format and makeup were not changed in the 2024 season from the previous season, with the same ten teams competing; the Kia Tigers, Doosan Bears, Lotte Giants, NC Dinos, LG Twins, Hanwha Eagles, KT Wiz, Samsung Lions, SSG Landers, and the Kiwoom Heroes. The LG Twins entered the season as the defending champions from the previous season. The Landers updated their team logo and cap insignia before the 2024 season.

The preseason started on March 9 and ended on March 19, with the Doosan Bears holding the top spot in the standings, finishing with a record of 8–0–1. The regular season started on March 23 and ended on October 1, with each team having played 144 games. The Kia Tigers were the regular season champions with a record of 87–55–2.

KT Wiz and SSG Landers finished the regular season with an identical record in fifth place, so they played a game against each other on October 1 to determine the final standings. KT won the tiebreaker game and advanced to the playoffs, while the Landers were eliminated.

In the 2024 Korean Series, the Kia Tigers defeated Samsung Lions 4–1 and clinched their record-extending twelfth title.

== Events ==
=== Retirements ===
Choo Shin-soo, RF – SSG Landers

In December 2023, it was announced that the 2024 season would be Choo Shin-soo's final season in professional baseball. Choo, who spent 15 years in Major League Baseball from 2005 to 2020, played in Seattle, Cleveland, Cincinnati and Texas. He turned 42 on July 13. Due to a shoulder injury, he was limited to playing only 77 of the 144 games played.

=== Draft ===
The 2024 KBO draft took place at Westin Chosun Hotel in Jung District, Seoul at 2 pm on February 14.

== Preseason ==
These are the final preseason standings.

The preseason began on March 9, and ended on March 19, 2024.

Preseason standings
Rank	Team	GP	W	L	D	PCT	GB	Home	Road
1	Doosan Bears	9	8	0	1	1.000	-	4–0–0	4–0–1
2	LG Twins	8	6	2	0	0.750	2	2–0–0	4–2–0
3	Hanwha Eagles	10	5	3	2	0.625	3	3–3–2	2–0–0
4	NC Dinos	10	6	4	0	0.600	3	4–2–0	2–2–0
5	KT Wiz	9	4	4	1	0.500	4	3–2–0	1–2–1
6	Kia Tigers	10	4	6	0	0.400	5	2-2-0	2–4-0
6	Samsung Lions	10	4	6	0	0.400	5	2-3-0	2–3–0
8	Lotte Giants	8	3	5	0	0.375	5	2-3-0	1–2–0
9	SSG Landers	10	3	7	0	0.300	6	2-4-0	1–3-0
10	Kiwoom Heroes	8	1	7	0	0.125	7	0–0–8	1–7–0

== Regular season ==
The regular season of the 2024 season began on March 23 and ended on October 1. Each team played 144 games, facing every other team 16 times. Regular season games were played every day except Mondays.

=== Standings ===
These are the final 2024 KBO League regular season standings.

Regular season standings
Rank	Team	GP	W	L	D	PCT	GB	Home	Road	STRK	Postseason
1	Kia Tigers	144	87	55	2	0.613	-	42-30-1	45-25-1	W2	Korean Series
2	Samsung Lions	144	78	64	2	0.549	9	41-32-0	37-32-2	L1	Playoff
3	LG Twins	144	76	66	2	0.535	11	39-33-1	37-33-1	W2	Semi-Playoff
4	Doosan Bears	144	74	68	2	0.521	13	39-31-1	35-37-1	W4	Wild Card Game
5	KT Wiz	144	72	70	2	0.507	15	34-36-1	38-34-1	W3	Wild Card Game
6	SSG Landers	144	72	70	2	0.507	15	35-35-1	37-35-1	W4	Did not qualify
7	Lotte Giants	144	66	74	4	0.471	20	37-31-3	29-43-1	W1	Did not qualify
8	Hanwha Eagles	144	66	76	2	0.465	21	30-39-2	36-37-0	L2	Did not qualify
9	NC Dinos	144	61	81	2	0.430	26	34-39-0	27-42-2	L2	Did not qualify
10	Kiwoom Heroes	144	58	86	0	0.403	30	32-41-0	26-45-0	L5	Did not qualify

Note: Draw results are ignored by the league when calculating win percentage and games behind.

== All-Star Game ==
On July 6, the KBO hosted an all-star game for the 2024 season. Like in previous all-star games, the ten KBO teams were divided into two All-Star teams: the Nanum All-Stars (나눔) and the Dream All-Stars (드림). The game was hosted at Incheon SSG Landers Field, the SSG Landers' home stadium. The Nanum All-Stars won the match 4–2.

2024 KBO All-Star Teams
Team	All-Star Team
Kia Tigers	Nanum All-Stars
Hanwha Eagles	Nanum All-Stars
LG Twins	Nanum All-Stars
NC Dinos	Nanum All-Stars
Kiwoom Heroes	Nanum All-Stars
Doosan Bears	Dream All-Stars
KT Wiz	Dream All-Stars
Lotte Giants	Dream All-Stars
Samsung Lions	Dream All-Stars
SSG Landers	Dream All-Stars

The best players (candidates) from each team were voted by fans, and the players with the most votes played in the all-star game.

The most voted infielders and pitchers within their position group played in the all-star game. The top 3 outfielders played in the all-star game in available positions, regardless if they are all on the same team.

=== Nanum All-Stars Lineup ===
Manager: Youm Kyoung-youb (LG Twins)

Nanum All-Stars Batting
#	Name	No.	Pos.	Team	BA	AB	R	H	HR	RBI	BB	SO	HBP	Votes	PV	Score
1	Kim Do-yeong	5	3B	Kia	0.200	5	0	1	0	0	0	0	0	1,353,562	160	44.26
2	Kim Hye-seong	3	2B	Kiwoom	0.500	3	1	1	0	0	1	0	0	1,286,124	189	45.50
	Song Sung-mun	24	2B	Kiwoom	0.000	1	0	0	0	0	1	0	0	-		
3	Ronnie Dawson	27	CF	Kiwoom	0.000	2	0	0	0	0	0	1	0	1,012,694	96	30.91
	Hong Chang-ki	51	CF	LG	0.000	2	0	0	0	0	0	0	0	-		
4	Austin Dean	23	1B	LG	0.500	4	2	2	1	2	0	0	0	-		
5	Na Sung-bum	47	RF	Kia	0.250	4	0	1	0	0	0	1	0	1,133,876	114	35.21
6	Choi Hyoung-woo	34	DH	Kia	0.750	4	1	3	1	2	0	1	0	1,167,426	98	34.45
7	Yonathan Perlaza	30	LF	Hanwha	0.000	2	0	0	0	0	0	1	0	1,276,715	142	40.92
	Kim Hyun-soo	22	LF	LG	0.000	2	0	0	0	0	0	0	0	-		
8	Park Dong-won	27	C	LG	0.500	2	0	1	0	0	0	0	0	923,264	130	32.14
	Kim Hyung-jun	25	C	NC	0.000	1	0	0	0	0	0	1	0	-		
	Choi Jae-hoon	13	C	Hanwha	0.000	1	0	0	0	0	0	0	0	-		
9	Park Chan-ho	1	SS	Kia	0.500	4	0	2	0	0	0	0	0	1,130,559	124	36.07

Nanum All-Stars Pitching
Name	No.	Pos.	Team	ERA	IP	NP	R	HR	SO	BB	HB	Votes	PV	Score
Ryu Hyun-jin	99	SP	Hanwha	0.00	1	12	0	0	1	0	0	979,867	155	35.69
Jeon Sang-hyun	51	RP	Kia	0.00	1	15	0	0	0	0	0	1,254,528	111	37.55
Joo Hyun-sang	66	CP	Hanwha	0.00	1	12	0	0	1	0	0	1,396,077	144	43.69

=== Dream All-Stars Lineup ===
Manager: Lee Kang-chul (KT Wiz)

Dream All-Stars Batting
#	Name	No.	Pos.	Team	BA	AB	R	H	HR	RBI	BB	SO	HBP	Votes	PV	Score
1	Koo Ja-wook	5	DH	Samsung	0.000	2	0	0	0	0	0	0	0	1,183,482	74	32.56
2	Jung Soo-bin	31	CF	Doosan	0.000	2	0	0	0	0	0	2	0	1,041,628	87	30.70
3	Yang Eui-ji	25	C	Doosan	0.000	1	0	0	0	0	0	0	0	1,362,773	195	47.72
4	Choi Jeong	14	3B	SSG	0.500	2	1	1	0	0	0	0	0	963,312	159	35.71
5	David MacKinnon	24	1B	Samsung	0.667	3	1	2	1	2	0	0	0	1,167,200	95	34.17
6	Yoon Dong-hee	91	RF	Samsung	0.000	3	0	0	0	0	0	1	0	1,038,735	66	28.68
7	Ryu Ji-hyuk	16	2B	Samsung	0.333	3	0	1	0	0	0	0	0	1,303,367	49	32.83
8	Lee Jae-hyeon	7	SS	Samsung	0.000	3	0	0	0	0	0	0	0	1,178,109	71	32.17
9	Hwang Seong-bin	0	LF	Lotte	0.333	3	0	1	0	0	0	0	0	-		

Dream All-Stars Pitching
Name	No.	Pos.	Team	ERA	IP	NP	R	HR	SO	BB	HB	Votes	PV	Score
Won Tae-in	18	SP	Samsung	0.00	1	21	0	0	1	1	0	1,282,671	111	38.16
Kim Taek-yeon	63	RP	Doosan	9.00	1	10	1	0	1	0	0	1,345,257	211	48.83
Oh Seung-hwan	21	CP	Samsung	0.00	2/3	6	0	0	0	0	0	846,628	112	28.80

=== Result ===
July 6, 2024 6:04 – 8:52 PM KST at Incheon SSG Landers Field
Team	1	2	3	4	5	6	7	8	9	R	H	E
Nanum All-Stars	0	1	2	0	0	0	0	1	0	4	11	1
Dream All-Stars	0	0	0	2	0	0	0	0	0	2	7	0
Starting pitchers: Nanum: Ryu Hyun-jin; Dream: Won Tae-in; WP: Ryu Hyun-jin LP: Kim Min Sv: Joo Hyun-sang; Home runs: Nanum: Choi Hyoung-woo (Top 2nd, solo off Kim Min) & Austin Dean (Top 3rd, 2 run off William Cuevas); Dream: David MacKinnon (Bottom 4th, 2 run off Kim Jae-yeol); Attendance: 22,500; Umpires: Lee Ki-joong, Moon Dong-gyoon, Kim Jun-hui, Lee Yong-hyuck, Jung Jong-soo, Jung Jun-yung

== Postseason ==
The 2024 KBO League postseason began on October 2. The Kia Tigers, Samsung Lions, LG Twins, Doosan Bears and KT Wiz qualified for the playoffs. The Tigers won the pennant race (first place).

=== Qualification ===
In order for a team to qualify for the postseason, they must rank fifth or higher in the regular season. Fifth and fourth place are guaranteed to play in the Wild Card, third in the semi-playoff, second in the playoff, and first in the Korean Series.

In the regular season standings, there is a Postseason column; indicating the postseason status of each team.

=== Postseason bracket ===
Wild Card
4	Doosan Bears	1
5	KT Wiz	2

Semi-playoff
3	LG Twins	3
5	KT Wiz	2

Playoff
2	Samsung Lions	3
3	LG Twins	1

Korean Series
1	Kia Tigers	4
2	Samsung Lions	1

=== Statistics and scores ===
==== Fifth place tiebreaker game ====
This year, the KT Wiz and SSG Landers tied in standings, causing an extra tiebreaker game to be played.

October 1, 2024 17:00 KST at Suwon KT Wiz Park
Team	1	2	3	4	5	6	7	8	9	R	H	E
SSG Landers	0	0	1	0	1	0	0	1	0	3	5	0
KT Wiz	1	0	0	0	0	0	0	3	—	4	5	0
Home runs: SSG: Choi Jeong (#1, 8th inning off Ko Young-pyo, 1 run); KT: Rojas (#1, 1st inning off Elías, 1 run; #2, 8th inning off Kim Kwang-hyun, 3 run); Umpires: Park Joong-chul, Kim Jung-guk, Kim Ik-su, Ham Ji-woong; Boxscore

==== Wild Card ====
The series started with a 1–0 advantage for the Bears. KT won the series 2–1. This was the first time in KBO history that a fifth-placed team advanced to the semi-playoffs.

===== Doosan Bears vs KT Wiz =====
Wild Card
Game	Date	Score	Venue	Time	Duration	Attendance
1	October 2, 2024	KT Wiz – 4, Doosan Bears – 0	Jamsil Baseball Stadium	18:30 KST	3:13	23,750
2	October 3, 2024	KT Wiz – 1, Doosan Bears – 0	Jamsil Baseball Stadium	14:00 KST	2:55	23,750

==== Semi-playoff ====
Quarterfinals – best of 5 series.

The Twins eliminated the Wiz in five games.

===== LG Twins vs KT Wiz =====
Semi-playoff
Game	Date	Score	Venue	Time	Duration	Attendance
1	October 5, 2024	KT Wiz – 3, LG Twins – 2	Jamsil Baseball Stadium	14:00 KST	2:36	23,750
2	October 6, 2024	KT Wiz – 2, LG Twins – 7	Jamsil Baseball Stadium	14:00 KST	3:17	23,750
3	October 8, 2024	LG Twins – 6, KT Wiz – 5	Suwon KT Wiz Park	18:30 KST	3:07	17,600
4	October 9, 2024	LG Twins – 5, KT Wiz – 6	Suwon KT Wiz Park	14:00 KST	4:10	17,600
5	October 11, 2024	KT Wiz – 1, LG Twins – 4	Jamsil Baseball Stadium	18:30 KST	2:42	23,750

==== Playoff ====
Semi-finals – best of 5 series.

Game 2 was rained out, so the game was played on October 15, instead of the 14th.

Game 4 was rained out, so the game was played on October 19, instead of the 18th.

Samsung ultimately won the series 3–1.

===== Samsung Lions vs LG Twins =====
Playoff
Game	Date	Score	Venue	Time	Duration	Attendance
1	October 13, 2024	LG Twins – 4, Samsung Lions – 10	Daegu Samsung Lions Park	14:00 KST	3:15	23,550
2	October 15, 2024	LG Twins – 5, Samsung Lions – 10	Daegu Samsung Lions Park	18:30 KST	3:20	23,550
3	October 17, 2024	Samsung Lions – 0, LG Twins – 1	Jamsil Baseball Stadium	18:30 KST	2:48	23,750
4	October 19, 2024	Samsung Lions – 1, LG Twins – 0	Jamsil Baseball Stadium	14:00 KST	2:54	23,750

==== 2024 Korean Series ====
Finals – best of 7 series.

The Tigers won the 2024 Korean Series in five games.

===== Kia Tigers vs Samsung Lions =====
2024 Korean Series
Game	Date	Score	Venue	Time	Duration	Attendance
1	October 21–23, 2024	Samsung Lions – 1, Kia Tigers – 5	Gwangju-Kia Champions Field	18:30 KST, 16:00 KST	3:16 (1:48, 1:28)	19,300
2	October 23, 2024	Samsung Lions – 3, Kia Tigers – 8	Gwangju-Kia Champions Field	18:30 KST	3:08	19,300
3	October 25, 2024	Kia Tigers – 2, Samsung Lions – 4	Daegu Samsung Lions Park	18:30 KST	3:09	23,550
4	October 26, 2024	Kia Tigers – 9, Samsung Lions – 2	Daegu Samsung Lions Park	14:00 KST	3:17	23,550
5	October 28, 2024	Samsung Lions – 5, Kia Tigers – 7	Gwangju-Kia Champions Field	18:30 KST	3:51	19,300

Legend • WC: Wild Card winner • SPO: Semi-playoff winner • PO: Playoff winner

Note: All dates and times are in KST (Korea Standard Time).
