= Lee Seung-hyun (baseball) =

South Korean baseball player (born 2002)

Samsung Lions – No. 57
- Pitcher
- Born: May 19, 2002 (age 24); Daegu, South Korea
- Bats: Left Throws: Left

KBO debut
- May 14, 2021, for the Samsung Lions

KBO statistics (through 2025)
- Win–loss record: 14–26
- Earned run average: 4.88
- Strikeouts: 282
- Stats at Baseball Reference

Teams
- Samsung Lions (2021–present)

Lee Seung-hyun (Korean: 이승현; born May 19, 2002) is a South Korean pitcher for the Samsung Lions in the Korea Baseball Organization (KBO).

Lee spent the first three seasons of his career in the bullpen but was converted to starting pitching in 2024.
