= Daegu Samsung Lions Park =

Multi-use stadium in Daegu, South Korea

- 대구삼성라이온즈파크

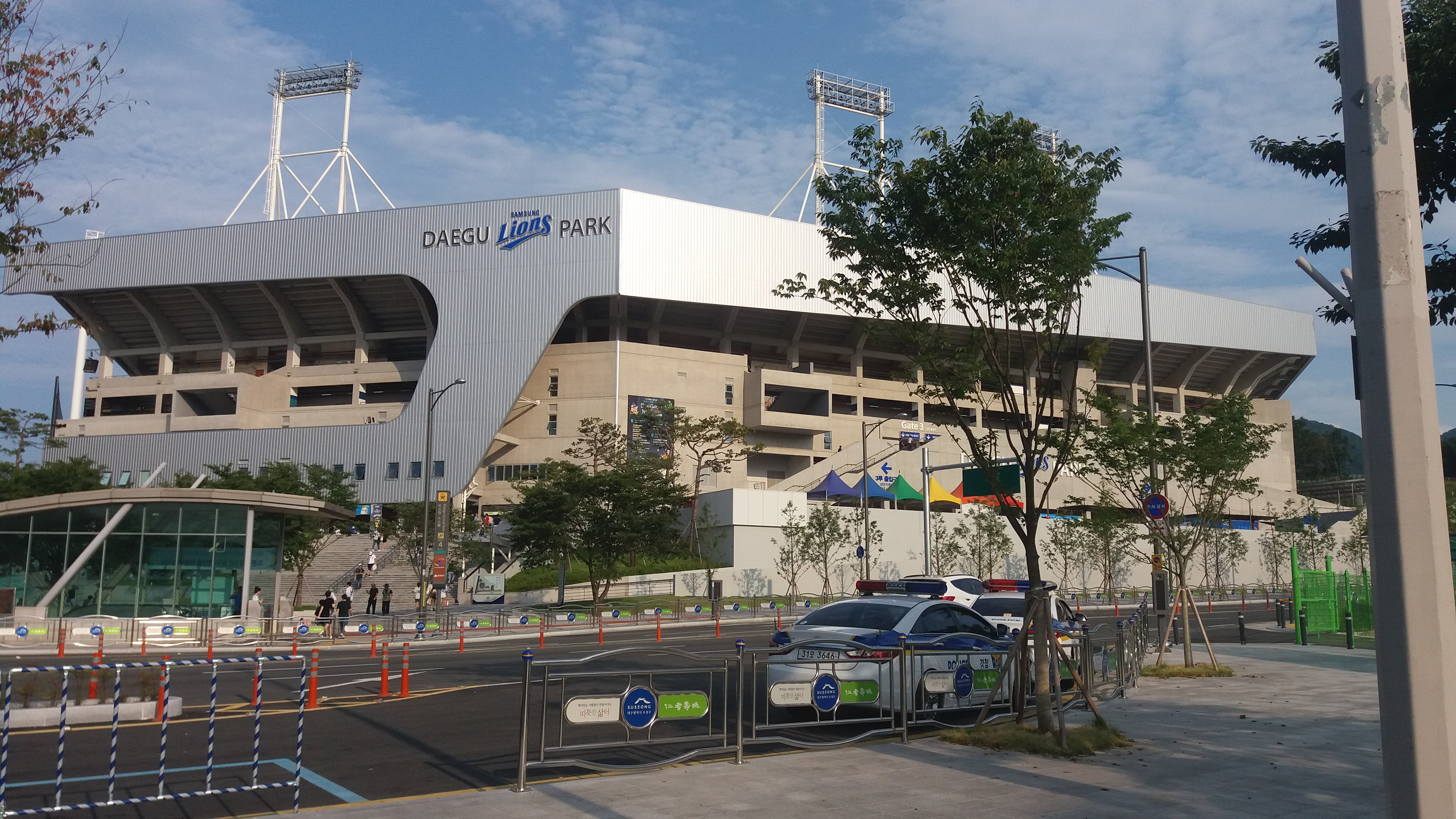
- Interactive map of Daegu Samsung Lions Park
- Location: Suseong-gu, Daegu, South Korea
- Coordinates: 35°50′27.3″N 128°40′53.8″E
- Owner: City of Daegu
- Capacity: 24,000
- Surface: Natural grass
- Field size: Left Field – 99.5 metres (326 ft); Left-Center – 123.4 metres (405 ft); Center Field – 122.5 metres (402 ft); Right-Center – 123.4 metres (405 ft); Right Field – 99.5 metres (326 ft); Outfield Wall Height – 3.6 metres (12 ft)

Construction
- Groundbreaking: 27 December 2012
- Built: 2012–2016
- Opened: 19 March 2016
- Cost: 162 billion won

Tenant
- Samsung Lions (2016–present)

The Daegu Samsung Lions Park (Korean: 대구삼성라이온즈파크) is a multi-use stadium in Daegu, South Korea. It is used mostly for baseball games and is the home stadium of KBO League club Samsung Lions.

The stadium is located adjacent to Suseong Alpha City Station on the Daegu Metro Line 2.
