= Ryan Weiss =

American baseball player (born 1996)

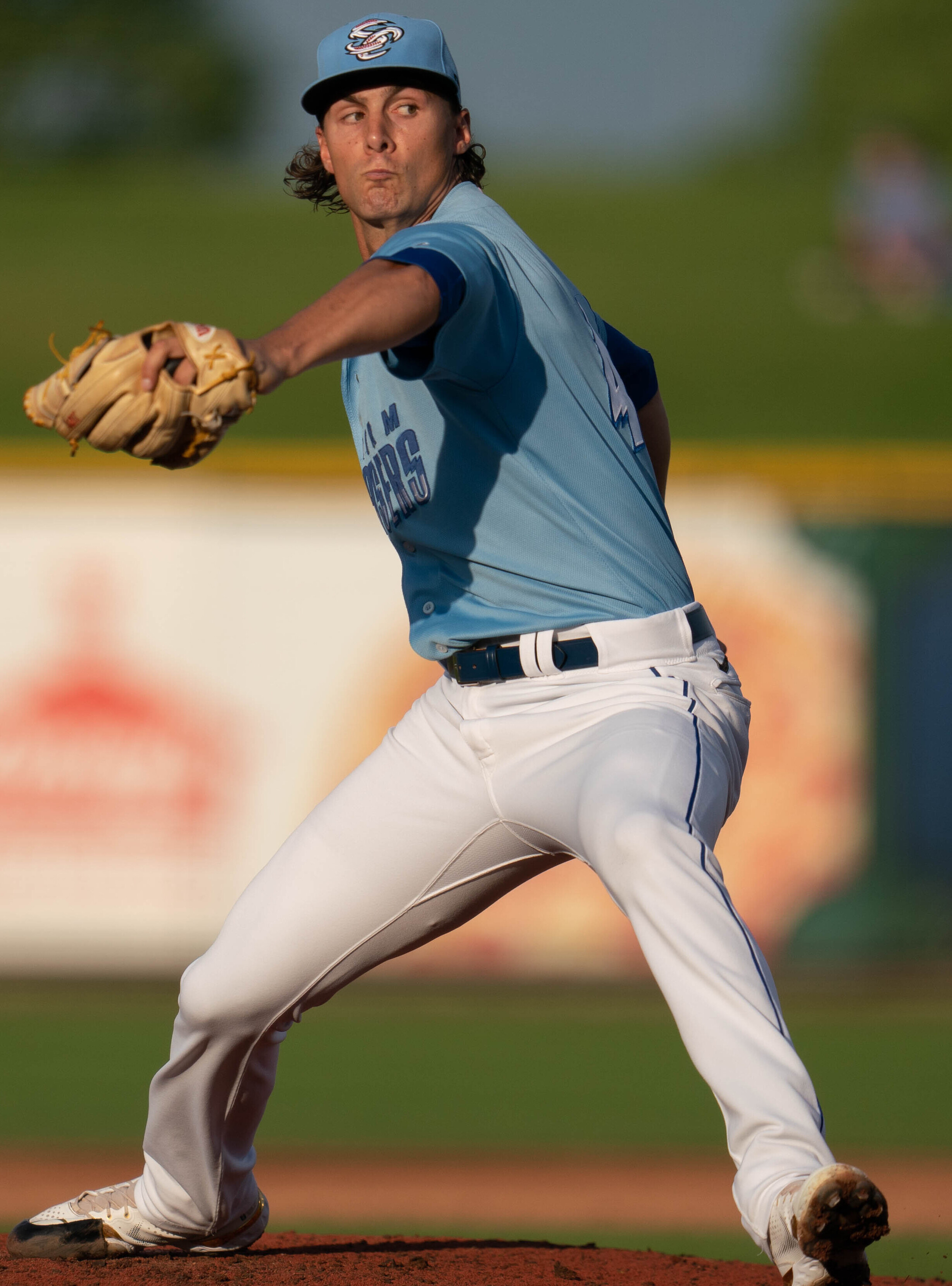
- Weiss with the Omaha Storm Chasers in 2022

San Diego Padres
- Pitcher
- Born: December 10, 1996 (age 29); South Elgin, Illinois, US
- Bats: Right Throws: Right

Professional debut
- CPBL: August 18, 2023, for the Fubon Guardians
- KBO: June 25, 2024, for the Hanwha Eagles
- MLB: March 27, 2026, for the Houston Astros

CPBL statistics (through 2023 season)
- Win–loss record: 4–1
- Earned run average: 2.32
- Strikeouts: 25

KBO statistics (through 2025 season)
- Win–loss record: 21–10
- Earned run average: 3.16
- Strikeouts: 305

MLB statistics (through 2026 season)
- Win–loss record: 0–3
- Earned run average: 7.62
- Strikeouts: 30
- Stats at Baseball Reference

Teams
- Fubon Guardians (2023); Hanwha Eagles (2024–2025); Houston Astros (2026)

Ryan Weiss (born December 10, 1996) is an American professional baseball pitcher for the San Diego Padres of Major League Baseball (MLB). He has previously played in the Chinese Professional Baseball League (CPBL) for the Fubon Guardians, in the KBO League for the Hanwha Eagles, and in Major League Baseball (MLB) for the Houston Astros. While playing in Korea, he gained the affectionate nickname Daejeon Jesus.

== Early life, family, education and amateur career ==
Weiss was born and raised in South Elgin, Illinois. He has a younger sister, Rachel. Both their parents died before his professional baseball career began in 2018: their mother near the beginning of 2018, and their father six years earlier.

Weiss attended South Elgin High School, While playing for its team, his fastball reached 84 mph (135 km/h).

He originally signed to play college baseball at Elgin Community College, but he switched his commitment to Wright State University in June 2015.

Weiss redshirted his freshman year at Wright State in 2016. In 2017, as a redshirt freshman, he appeared in 15 games (14 starts) in which he compiled a 2.13 ERA with 80 strikeouts over 88 2/3 innings and was named the Horizon League Freshman of the Year alongside earning All-American honors. By the end of his freshman season, his fastball had risen to 95 miles per hour (153 km/h). That summer, he played collegiate summer baseball with the Hyannis Harbor Hawks of the Cape Cod Baseball League and was named a league all-star. In 2018, he pitched to a 3.40 ERA over 98 innings. After the season's end, he was selected by the Arizona Diamondbacks in the fourth round of the 2018 Major League Baseball draft.

== Professional baseball career ==
=== Arizona Diamondbacks ===
After signing, Weiss made his professional debut with the Rookie-level Arizona League Diamondbacks before being promoted to the Hillsboro Hops of the Low–A Northwest League. Over 30 1/3 innings, he compiled a 3.86 ERA. Weiss began the 2019 season with the Single–A Midwest League Kane County Cougars and was later promoted to the Visalia Rawhide of the High–A California League, pitching 128 1/3 innings to an 8–7 record and a 4.07 ERA over 26 starts between both teams.

He did not play in a game in 2020 due to the cancellation of the minor league season because of the COVID-19 pandemic. In 2021, Weiss began the year with the Amarillo Sod Poodles of the Double-A Central and was promoted to the Reno Aces of the Triple-A West in July. Over 34 appearances (eight starts) between the two clubs, Weiss went 6–3 with a 4.60 ERA and 88 strikeouts over 78 1/3 innings.

On November 19, 2021, the Diamondbacks selected Weiss' contract and added him to their 40-man roster. He opened the 2022 season with Amarillo and was promoted to Reno in late May. On June 26, he was designated for assignment following the promotion of Dallas Keuchel.

=== Kansas City Royals ===
On July 1, 2022, Weiss was claimed off waivers by the Kansas City Royals and optioned to the Triple-A Omaha Storm Chasers. In 30 games out of the bullpen for Omaha, Weiss registered a 2–2 record and 7.82 ERA with 34 strikeouts in 35 2/3 innings pitched. Following the season, on October 26, he was removed from the 40-man roster and sent outright to Triple–A.

Weiss was assigned to Triple–A Omaha to begin the 2023 season. In 12 appearances, he struggled to a 7.07 ERA with 15 strikeouts in 14.0 innings of work. Weiss was released by the Royals organization on May 20, 2023.

=== High Point Rockers ===
On June 6, 2023, Weiss signed with the High Point Rockers of the Atlantic League of Professional Baseball. He made 9 starts for the Rockers, posting a 5–3 record and 4.61 ERA with 52 strikeouts in 54 2/3 innings pitched. On July 29, Weiss was released by High Point.

=== Fubon Guardians ===
On August 3, 2023, Weiss signed with the Fubon Guardians of the Chinese Professional Baseball League (CPBL). In 5 starts for the Guardians, he registered a 4–1 record and 2.32 ERA with 25 strikeouts across 31 innings. Weiss became a free agent following the season.

=== High Point Rockers (second stint) ===
On April 15, 2024, Weiss signed with the High Point Rockers of the Atlantic League of Professional Baseball. In 9 starts for the Rockers, Weiss compiled a 3–4 record and 4.34 ERA with 73 strikeouts across 45 2/3 innings of work.

=== Hanwha Eagles ===
On June 16, 2024, Weiss' contract was purchased by the Hanwha Eagles of the KBO League. Weiss appeared in his first game for the Eagles on June 25, striking out seven Doosan Bears batters in six scoreless innings of work. Alongside veteran major leaguers Hyun-jin Ryu and Jaime Barría in the starting rotation, Weiss contributed to the team posting a 14–10 record in August and making a surprise late entry into the race for the KBO playoffs.

Weiss notably struck out 12 SSG Landers on August 16, and recorded a win against the champions–to–be Kia Tigers in his final outing of the year on September 27. In 16 total starts for the '24 Eagles, he compiled a 5–5 record and 3.73 ERA with 98 strikeouts across 91 2/3 innings pitched. On November 22, 2024, Weiss re–signed with Hanwha on a one–year, $950,000 contract.

In 2025, the Eagles paired Weiss with international free agent Cody Ponce as the team's front-line starters for the inaugural season at the new Daejeon Hanwha Life Ballpark. Pitching in his first full season in Korea, Weiss appeared on the mound for a full slate of 30 starts, posting a 16–5 record and 2.87 ERA while striking out 207 batters across 178 2/3 innings. He achieved his first 10-win season as a professional in a game against the Kiwoom Heroes at the Gocheok Sky Dome on July 7, where he struck out 11 batters and yielded only 2 hits in 6 innings, turning in the fifth of his eight total double-digit strikeout performances in 2025.

The Eagles finished the regular season in second place, narrowly trailing only the LG Twins. Behind career-high offensive performances by third baseman Roh Si-hwan and left fielder Moon Hyun-bin, their strong rotation secured the team's first postseason berth since 2018. On October 24, the Ponce-Weiss duo defeated the Samsung Lions in the deciding fifth game of the playoff round to earn the first trip to the Korean Series for the Eagles since 2006. Appearing from the bullpen, Weiss was credited with the save as he completed the final 12 outs of the game after Ponce's quality start, sending the Eagles onward to Seoul. In the 2025 Korean Series, the Eagles were defeated 4–1 by the LG Twins. Weiss started game 4 in Daejeon on October 30, facing a 1–2 deficit in the series. In a spirited outing where he threw 117 pitches across 7 2/3 innings, he struck out seven and allowed only four hits, leaving the game in the top of the eighth inning with a 3–0 lead and Twins infielder Shin Min-jae on second base. Shin scored on a hit off of reliever Kim Seo-hyeon, plating the only run charged to Weiss in the Korean Series. The Twins went on to win game 4 in the ninth inning, erasing Weiss as the winning pitcher of record, and won the series in the conclusive fifth game.

=== Houston Astros ===
On December 9, 2025, Weiss signed a one-year, $2.6 million contract with the Houston Astros.

Weiss competed for the starting pitcher role in the Astros' 2026 spring camp. He made his breakout spring performance in an exhibition game against the championship-winning Venezuelan World Baseball Classic team on March 3, where he struck out Ronald Acuña Jr., Jackson Chourio, and Eugenio Suárez, coincidentally appearing in the same inning as Venezuelan pitcher Ricardo Sánchez who Weiss once replaced on the KBO's Hanwha Eagles. Weiss made his first appearance as a starting pitcher in major league spring training on March 14 and was named the winner against the New York Mets and starter Freddy Peralta.

The Astros named Weiss to their Opening Day roster in 2026 as a relief pitcher, and he made his major league debut on March 27 against the Los Angeles Angels in Houston, Texas. He allowed a home run to his first batter faced in the major leagues, Zach Neto, but Weiss recorded his first major league strikeout against Jorge Soler. He made nine appearances (including two starts) for the Astros, registering an 0–3 record and 7.62 ERA with 30 strikeouts over 26 innings of work. Weiss was designated for assignment by Houston on June 12. He cleared waivers and was sent outright to the Triple-A Sugar Land Space Cowboys on June 17. On October 29, 2026, Houston declined a $5 million club option for the following season, making Weiss a free agent.

=== San Diego Padres ===
On November 10, 2026, the San Diego Padres signed Weiss to a one-year contract, with a club option for the 2028 season.

== Personal life ==
Weiss married Hailey Brooke in 2021. The couple announced Hailey's pregnancy in November 2025, when they departed South Korea after the 2025 Korean Series. Days later, Weiss signed a major league deal with the Houston Astros. At his major league debut on March 27, 2026, Weiss was cheered on by more than a dozen friends and family members who were able to attend Houston's home game and who all wore the Astros' number 51 Weiss jersey.
