= 2025 in baseball =

The following are the baseball events of the year 2025 throughout the world.

== International competition ==
=== National Team tournaments ===
- U-12 Baseball World Cup (July 25–August 3): United States
- U-18 Baseball World Cup (September 5–14): United States
- Asian Baseball Championship (September 22–28): Japan
- Copa América (November 13–22): Cancelled
- European Men's U23 Baseball Championship (August 5–9): Great Britain
- European Men's Baseball Championship (September 20–27): Netherlands
- Pacific Mini Games (June 30–July 8): Palau
- Southeast Asian Games – Baseball (December 9–12): Philippines
- Southeast Asian Games – Baseball5 (December 11–14): Thailand
- West Asia Baseball Cup (May 1–8): Palestine
- Women's Baseball Asian Cup (October 26–November 2): Japan
- Women's Baseball Pan American Championship (September 20–26): Venezuela
- Women's European Baseball Championship (August 14–17): Great Britain
- World Baseball Classic Qualifier - Taipei (February 21–25): Nicaragua and Chinese Taipei
- World Baseball Classic Qualifier - Tucson (March 2–6): Colombia and Brazil
- Youth Baseball5 World Cup (September 24–27): Cuba

=== Club team tournaments ===
- Baseball Champions League Americas (April 8–13): Diablos Rojos del México
- Caribbean Series (January 31–February 7): Leones del Escogido
- European Champions Cup (May 17–July 30): Heidenheim Heideköpfe
- Grand Forks International (June 22–29): Alaska Goldpanners
- Serie de las Américas (January 24–30): Águilas Metropolitanas

=== Little League ===
- Little League World Series: Tung-Yuan Little League (Taipei, Taiwan)
- Intermediate League World Series: Flor Amarillo Little League (Valencia, Venezuela)
- Junior League World Series: Chang-Shan Junior Little League (Taichung, Taiwan)
- Senior League World Series: Amelia Baseball Club Little League (Guaynabo, Puerto Rico)

== North American domestic leagues ==
=== Major League Baseball ===
Wild Card Series (ALWCS, NLWCS)
4	NY Yankees	2
5	Boston	1
3	Cleveland	1
6	Detroit	2
4	Chicago Cubs	2
5	San Diego	1
3	LA Dodgers	2
6	Cincinnati	0

Division Series (ALDS, NLDS)
1	Toronto	3
4	NY Yankees	1
American League
2	Seattle	3
6	Detroit	2
1	Milwaukee	3
4	Chicago Cubs	2
National League
2	Philadelphia	1
3	LA Dodgers	3

Championship Series (ALCS, NLCS)
1	Toronto	4
2	Seattle	3
1	Milwaukee	0
3	LA Dodgers	4

World Series
AL1	Toronto	3
NL3	LA Dodgers	4

=== Minor League Baseball ===
- Triple–A
  - International League: Jacksonville Jumbo Shrimp (Miami Marlins)
  - Pacific Coast League: Las Vegas Aviators (Athletics)
    - Triple-A National Championship Game: Jacksonville Jumbo Shrimp (Miami Marlins)
- Double–A
  - Eastern League: Binghamton Rumble Ponies (New York Mets)
  - Southern League: Birmingham Barons (Chicago White Sox)
  - Texas League: Springfield Cardinals (St. Louis Cardinals)
- High–A
  - Midwest League: West Michigan Whitecaps (Detroit Tigers)
  - Northwest League: Everett AquaSox (Seattle Mariners)
  - South Atlantic League: Brooklyn Cyclones (New York Mets)
- Single–A
  - California League: San Jose Giants (San Francisco Giants)
  - Carolina League: Lynchburg Hillcats (Cleveland Guardians)
  - Florida State League: Lakeland Flying Tigers (Detroit Tigers)
- Rookie
  - Arizona Complex League: ACL Angels (Los Angeles Angels)
  - Dominican Summer League: DSL Padres Gold (San Diego Padres)
  - Florida Complex League: FCL Blue Jays (Toronto Blue Jays)
- Fall League
  - Arizona Fall League: Surprise Saguaros

=== Independent baseball leagues ===
- MLB Partner Leagues
  - American Association of Professional Baseball: Kane County Cougars
  - Atlantic League of Professional Baseball: York Revolution
  - Frontier League: Québec Capitales
  - Pioneer League: Oakland Ballers
- Non-partner leagues
  - Empire Professional Baseball League: Malone Border Hounds
  - Pecos League: Tucson Saguaros
  - United Shore Professional Baseball League: Eastside Diamond Hoppers
  - Intercounty Baseball League: Welland Jackfish

=== College baseball ===
- NCAA
  - Division I (Men's College World Series): LSU
  - Division II: Tampa
  - Division III: Wisconsin–Whitewater
- NAIA: LSU–Shreveport
  - The Pilots finished the season 59–0, becoming the first known college team at any level of competition to complete an unbeaten season.
- U Sports
  - OUA: Toronto
- CCAA
  - RSEQ: Limoilou
  - OCAA: Fanshawe
- USCAA: Salem (WV)
- NCCAA: Jessup
- Junior College World Series:
  - NJCAA Division I: Salt Lake
  - NJCAA Division II: Pasco–Hernando State
  - NJCAA Division III: RCSJ–Gloucester
  - California: Mt. San Antonio
  - Northwest: Linn–Benton

=== Collegiate Summer Baseball Leagues ===
- Appalachian League: Bluefield Ridge Runners
- Cape Cod League: Bourne Braves
- MLB Draft League: West Virginia Black Bears
- New England Collegiate Baseball League: Keene Swamp Bats

== Other domestic leagues and tournaments ==
=== Summer leagues ===
- Cuban Elite League: Tigres de Ciego de Ávila
- Dutch League—Holland Series: Neptunus
- Finnish League: Tampere Tigers
- French League: Huskies de Rouen
- German League: Heidenheim Heideköpfe
- Italian Baseball League: San Marino Baseball Club
- Irish League: Dublin Spartans
- Korean League—Korean Series: LG Twins
- Nippon Professional Baseball—Japan Series: Fukuoka SoftBank Hawks
  - Central League: Hanshin Tigers
  - Pacific League: Fukuoka SoftBank Hawks
- Mexican League: Diablos Rojos del México
- Spanish League: Tenerife Marlins
- Swedish League: Rättvik Butchers
- Taiwan League—Taiwan Series: Rakuten Monkeys

=== Winter leagues ===
- Australian Baseball League: Canberra Cavalry
- Baseball United: Mid East Falcons
- Colombian League: Caimanes de Barranquilla
- Dominican League: Leones del Escogido
- Mexican Pacific League: Charros de Jalisco
- Nicaraguan League: Leones de León
- Panamanian League: Águilas Metropolitanas
- Puerto Rican League: Indios de Mayagüez
- Venezuelan League: Cardenales de Lara

=== Japanese Koshien Tournaments ===
- Spring Koshien: Yokohama (Kanagawa)
- Summer Koshien: Okinawa Shogaku (Okinawa)

== Events ==
=== January ===
- January 21: The results of the Baseball Writers' Association of America's voting for the 2025 Hall of Fame induction class were announced. Ichiro Suzuki, CC Sabathia, and Billy Wagner were the candidates elected, with Ichiro missing out on unanimous induction by one vote.

=== February ===
- February 21: The New York Yankees end their appearance policy, in place since 1976, by allowing players to have "well-groomed beards."
- February 23: Nicaragua qualifies for the 2026 WBC, winning the opening round of qualifiers Pool A.
- February 25: Chinese Taipei qualifies for the WBC, defeating Spain in the second-place playoff.

=== March ===
- March 4: Colombia qualifies for the WBC, winning the opening round of qualifiers Pool B.
- March 6: Brazil qualifies for the WBC, defeating Germany in the second-place playoff.
- March 15–16: Exhibition games are held in Tokyo between the MLB's Chicago Cubs and Los Angeles Dodgers and the NPB's Hanshin Tigers and Yomiuri Giants.
- March 18–19: The 2025 Major League Baseball season began with the MLB Tokyo Series 2025, played at the Tokyo Dome between the Los Angeles Dodgers and Chicago Cubs.
- March 22: The 2025 KBO League season begins.
- March 31: The Athletics play their first home game at Sutter Health Park in West Sacramento, California, as part of the franchise's ongoing transition to Las Vegas.

=== April ===
- April 15: Jackie Robinson Day
- April 26: Eugenio Suárez of the Arizona Diamondbacks hits four home runs in a single game against the Atlanta Braves, although the team would ultimately lose 7–8.

=== June ===
- June 13–22: The 2025 Men's College World Series is held at Charles Schwab Field in Omaha, Nebraska.

=== July ===
- July 12: The 2025 KBO All-Star Game is played at Daejeon Hanwha Life Ballpark in Daejeon.
- July 13–14: At the 2025 Major League Baseball draft, first overall pick Eli Willits is selected by the Washington Nationals.
- July 15: The 95th Major League Baseball All-Star Game is played at Truist Park in Cumberland, Georgia. The "swing-off" tiebreaker rule is invoked for the first time, with the National League winning the swing-off 4–3.
- July 25: Nick Kurtz of the Athletics becomes the first rookie in MLB history to hit four home runs in a single game.

=== August ===
- August 3: The MLB Speedway Classic is played at Bristol Motor Speedway in Bristol, Tennessee, between the Atlanta Braves and Cincinnati Reds. The game was suspended due to rain in the first inning the previous night and then it resumed and the rest was played the following day.
- August 28: Kyle Schwarber of the Philadelphia Phillies becomes the third player of the MLB season to hit four home runs in a single game.

=== September ===
- September 24: Cal Raleigh of the Seattle Mariners hits his 60th home run of the season, becoming the first catcher, first switch-hitter, and seventh player in MLB history to join the 60 home run club.
- September 28: The MLB regular season ends, as it becomes the first since the 2005 season in which a no-hitter did not take place.
- September 30: The American League Wild Card Series and National League Wild Card Series begin.

=== October ===
- October 4: The American League Division Series and National League Division Series begin.
- October 12: The American League Championship Series begins.
- October 13: The National League Championship Series begins.
- October 21: The Women's Pro Baseball League announces its inaugural four teams will be hosted by New York City, Boston, Los Angeles, and San Francisco.
- October 24: The 2025 World Series begins.
- October 30: The Fukuoka SoftBank Hawks defeat the Hanshin Tigers in game 5 of the 2025 Japan Series to win their 12th championship.
- October 31: The LG Twins defeat the Hanwha Eagles in game 5 of the 2025 Korean Series to win their fourth championship.

=== November ===
- November 1: The Los Angeles Dodgers defeat the Toronto Blue Jays in game 7 for their ninth World Series championship, becoming the first MLB franchise with consecutive World Series titles since the 2000 New York Yankees.
- November 2: Eligible MLB players become free agents.

=== December ===
- December 7–10: Winter Meetings in Orlando, Florida
- December 10: Rule 5 draft

== Deaths ==
=== January ===
- January 3 – Bob Veale, 89, pitcher from 1962–74 for the Pirates and Red Sox.
- January 6 – Brian Matusz, 37, pitcher from 2009–16 for the Orioles and Cubs.
- January 8 – Jim Lawrence, 85, catcher for the 1963 Indians.
- January 10 – Félix Mantilla, 90, infielder and outfielder from 1956–66 for the Braves, Mets, Red Sox and Astros.
- January 15 – Tommy Brown, 97, utility player from 1944–53 for the Dodgers, Phillies and Cubs.
- January 16 – Bob Uecker, 90, catcher from 1962–67 for the Braves, Cardinals and Phillies and later a broadcaster for the Brewers from 1971–2024.
- January 19 – Jeff Torborg, 83, catcher from 1964–73 for the Dodgers and Angels and later a coach and manager for the Indians, Yankees, White Sox, Mets, Expos and Marlins and broadcaster for the Braves among others.
- January 20 – Bobby Cuellar, 72, pitcher for the Rangers in 1977 and long time coach in the majors and minors.
- January 30 – Don Secrist, 80, pitcher for the 1969–70 White Sox.

=== February ===
- February 1 –
  - Fay Vincent, 86, baseball commissioner from 1989–92.
  - Ángel Torres, 72, pitcher for the 1977 Reds.
- February 3 –
  - Rich Dauer, 72, second baseman from 1976–85 for the Orioles and coach for multiple teams from 1990–2017.
  - Jim Todd, 77, pitcher from 1974–79 for the Cubs, Athletics and Mariners.
- February 4 –
  - Dave Van Gorder, 67, catcher from 1982–87 for the Reds and Oroles.
  - Felipe Montemayor, 96, outfielder for the 1953 and 1955 Pirates.
- February 17 – Eddie Fisher, 88, pitcher from 1959–73 for the Giants, White Sox, Orioles, Indians, Angels and Cardinals.
- February 18 – Scott Sauerbeck, 53, pitcher from 1999–2006 for the Pirates, Red Sox, Indians and Athletics.
- February 23 –
  - Larry Dolan, 94, owner of the Indians/Guardians from 2000–25.
  - Bobby Malkmus, 93, infielder from 1957–62 for the Braves, Senators and Phillies.

=== March ===
- March 3 – Frank Saucier, 98, outfielder for the 1951 St. Louis Browns.
- March 4 – José Valdivielso, 90, shortstop from 1955–61 for the Senators and Twins.
- March 6 – Art Schallock, 100, pitcher from 1951–55 for the Yankees and Orioles.
- March 13 – Jim Breazeale, 75, first baseman from 1969–78 for the Braves and White Sox.
- March 19 – Tommie Reynolds, 83, outfielder from 1963–72 for the Athletics, Mets, Angels and Brewers and coach from 1989–96 for the Athletics and Cardinals.

=== April ===
- April 5 –
  - Nate Oliver, 84, second baseman from 1963–69 for the Dodgers, Giants, Yankees and Cubs and later a minor league coach and manager.
  - Billy Smith, 70, outfielder for the 1981 Astros.
  - Carl Warwick, 88, outfielder from 1961–66 for the Dodgers, Cardinals, Colt .45s, Orioles and Cubs
- April 8 –
  - Tony Blanco, 44, first baseman for the 2005 Nationals and various Japanese teams from 2009–16.
  - Octavio Dotel, 51, pitcher for 13 major league teams from 1999–2013.
- April 13 – Tommy Helms, 83, second baseman from 1964–77 for the Reds, Astros, Pirates and Red Sox and manager for the Reds from 1988–89
- April 15 – Marshall Edwards, 72, outfielder for the 1981–83 Brewers.
- April 20 – Chito Martínez, 59, outfielder for the 1991-1993 Orioles.
- April 24 – Tom Brown, 84, utility player for the 1963 Senators.
- April 25 – Walt Jocketty, 74, baseball executive and general manager for the Cardinals and Reds from 1994–2016.
- April 26 – Vic Harris, 75, utility player from 1972–1983 for the Rangers, Cubs, Cardinals, Giants, Brewers and Kinetsu Buffaloes.

=== May ===
- May 7 – Frank Johnson, 82, outfielder and corner infielder for the 1966–71 Giants and 1972 Lotte Onions.
- May 8 – Chet Lemon, 70, outfielder from 1975–90 for the White Sox and Tigers.
- May 12 –
  - Jack Curtis, 88, pitcher from 1961–63 for the Cubs, Braves and Indians.
  - Mark Esser, 69, pitcher for the 1979 White Sox.
- May 13 – Rich Rollins, 87, third baseman from 1961–70 for the Twins, Brewers and Indians.
- May 14 – Rod Nichols, 60, pitcher from 1988–97 for the Indians, Dodgers, Braves and Fukuoka Daiei Hawks.
- May 17 – Jason Conti, 50, outfielder from 2000–04 for the Diamondbacks, Devil Rays, Brewers and Rangers.
- May 20 – Scott Klingenbeck, 54, pitcher from 1994–98 for the Orioles, Twins and Reds.
- May 26 – Horace Speed, 73, outfielder from 1975–79 for the Giants and Indians.
- May 28 – Verle Tiefenthaler, 87, pitcher for the 1962 White Sox.

=== June ===
- June 3 – Shigeo Nagashima, 89, third baseman from 1958–74 for the Yomiuri Giants and manager 1975–80, 1993–2001 for the Yomiuri Giants.
- June 13 – Johnny O'Brien, 94, second baseman and pitcher from 1953–59 for the Pirates, Cardinals and Braves.
- June 16 – Ron Taylor, 87, pitcher from 1962–72 for the Indians, Cardinals, Astros, Mets and Padres.
- June 22 – Matt Murray, 54, pitcher from 1995–97 for the Braves, Red Sox and Elephants.
- June 24 – Diego Seguí, 87, pitcher from 1962–77 for the Athletics, Senators, Pilots, Cardinals, Red Sox and Mariners.
- June 25 – Bob Heffner, 86, pitcher from 1963–68 for the Red Sox, Indians and Angels.
- June 27 –
  - Hosken Powell, 70, right fielder from 1978–83 for the Twins and Blue Jays.
  - Ed Mickelson, 98, first baseman from 1950–57 for the Cardinals, Browns and Cubs.
- June 28 – Dave Parker, 74, Hall of Fame right fielder from 1973–91 for the Pirates, Reds, Athletics, Brewers, Angels and Blue Jays.

=== July ===
- July 3 – Billy Hunter, 97, shortstop from 1953–58 for the Browns, Orioles, Yankees, Athletics and Indians and coach from 1964–77 for the Orioles.
- July 4 – Bobby Jenks, 44, pitcher from 2005–11 for the White Sox and Red Sox and later a minor league coach.
- July 9 –
  - Joe Coleman, 78, pitcher from 1965–79 for the Senators, Tigers, Cubs, Athletics, Blue Jays, Giants and Pirates.
  - Lee Elia, 87, shortstop from 1966–68 for the White Sox and Cubs and coach and manager for several teams from 1980–2008.
- July 12 – Jim Clancy, 69, pitcher from 1977–91 for the Blue Jays, Astros and Braves.
- July 19 – Jeff Bittiger, 63, pitcher from 1986–89 for the Phillies, Twins and White Sox.
- July 28 – Ryne Sandberg, 65, Hall of Fame second baseman from 1981–97 for the Phillies and Cubs and coach and manager for the Phillies from 2013–15.

=== August ===
- August 7 – Rich Hinton, 78, pitcher from 1971–79 for the White Sox, Yankees, Rangers, Reds and Mariners.
- August 8 – Félix Torres, 93, third baseman for the 1962–64 Angels.
- August 12 – Bill Hepler, 79, pitcher for the 1966 Mets.
- August 19 – Phil Meeler, 77, pitcher for the 1972 Tigers.
- August 24 – Marc Hill, 73, catcher from 1973–86 for the Cardinals, Giants, Mariners and White Sox and later a minor league manager.
- August 28 –
  - Randy Moffitt, 76, pitcher from 1972–83 for the Giants, Astros and Blue Jays.
  - Daryl Patterson, 81, pitcher from 1968–74 for the Tigers, Athletics, Cardinals and Pirates.

=== September ===
- September 5 – Davey Johnson, 82, second baseman from 1965–78 for the Orioles, Braves, Yomiuri Giants, Phillies, and Cubs and manager from 1984–2013 for the Mets, Reds, Orioles, Dodgers, and Nationals.
- September 6 – Carlos Lezcano, 69, outfielder from the 1980–81 Cubs.
- September 7 –
  - Brian Dayett, 68, outfielder from 1983–91 for the Yankees, Cubs and Ham Fighters.
  - Jim Marshall, 94, first baseman from 1958–65 for the Orioles, Cubs, Giants, Mets, Pirates and Dragons and Manager from 1974–76 for the Cubs and for the 1979 Athletics.
- September 8 – Tom Patton, 90, catcher for the 1957 Orioles.
- September 9 – Jim Dickson, 87, pitcher from 1963–66 for the Colt .45s, Reds and Athletics.
- September 15 – Ted Ford, 78, outfielder from 1970–72 for the Indians and Rangers.
- September 18 – Ed Acosta, 81, pitcher from 1970–72 from the Pirates and Padres.
- September 21 – Bob Oldis, 97, catcher from 1953–63 for the Senators, Pirates and Phillies.

=== October ===
- October 9 – Mike Greenwell, 62, outfielder in MLB for the Red Sox from 1985–1996 and for the Tigers of NPB in 1997.
- October 13 – Sandy Alomar Sr., 81, infielder played fourteen seasons from 1964–1978 for six major league teams beginning in 1964 with the Braves, Mets, White Sox, Angels, Yankees and Rangers. He was later a coach in the major leagues from 1986–2009. Father of Hall of Famer Roberto Alomar and Sandy Alomar Jr.
- October 14 –
  - Larry Burright, 88, infielder from 1962–64 for the Dodgers and Mets.
  - Craig Eaton, 71, pitcher for the 1979 Royals.
- October 15 – John Morris, 84, pitcher from 1966–74 for the Phillies, Orioles, Pilots, Brewers and Giants.
- October 17 – Bill Pleis, 88, pitcher from 1961–66 for the Twins.
- October 18 – Bernie Smith, 84, outfielder for the 1970–71 Brewers.
- October 19 –
  - Rob Mallicoat, 60, pitcher from 1987–92 for the Astros.
  - Mickey McGuire, 84, infielder from 1962–74 for the Orioles in MLB and the Carp in NPB.
  - Jesús Montero, 35, catcher from 2011–15 for the Yankees and Mariners.
- October 30 –
  - Steve Hargan, 83, pitcher from 1965–77 for the Indians, Rangers, Blue Jays and Braves.
  - Yoervis Medina, 37, pitcher from 2013–15 for the Mariners and Cubs.

=== November ===
- November 2 – Yoshinori Hirose, 89, outfielder from 1956–77 and manager from 1978–80 for the Nankai Hawks.
- November 9 – Bill Slack, 92, minor league manager and coach from 1961–2003.
- November 11 – Helen Waddell, 95, AAGPBL outfielder from 1949–51 for the Sallies, Peaches, and Belles.
- November 14 – Tom Timmermann, 85, pitcher from 1969–73 for the Tigers and Indians.
- November 18 – Randy Jones, 75, Pitcher from 1973–82 for the Padres. 1976 National League Cy Young Award winner.
- November 19 – Bart Shirley, 85, Infielder from 1964–72 for the Dodgers and Mets in MLB and the Dragons in NPB.
- November 23 – Dave Morehead, 82, pitcher from 1963–70 for the Red Sox and Royals.
- November 24 – George Altman, 92, outfielder from 1959–75 for the Cubs, Cardinals and Mets from MLB and the Orions and Tigers from NPB.
- November 30 – Tim Harkness, 87, first baseman from 1961–64 for the Dodgers and Mets.

=== December ===
- December 4 – Steve Hertz, 80, third baseman for the 1964 Colt .45s.
- December 12 – Greg Thayer, 76, pitcher who played for the 1978 Twins.
- December 15 – Mike Campbell, 61, pitcher from 1987–96 for the Mariners, Rangers, Padres and Cubs.
- December 16 – Albert Hall, 67, outfielder from 1981–89 for the Braves and Pirates.
- December 19 – Andy Kosco, 84, outfielder from 1965–74 for the Twins, Yankees, Dodgers, Brewers, Angels, Red Sox and Reds.

== See also ==
- 2025 KBO League season
- 2025 Nippon Professional Baseball season
- 2025 Major League Baseball season
