= Gwa-jam =

South Korean jumper worn by students

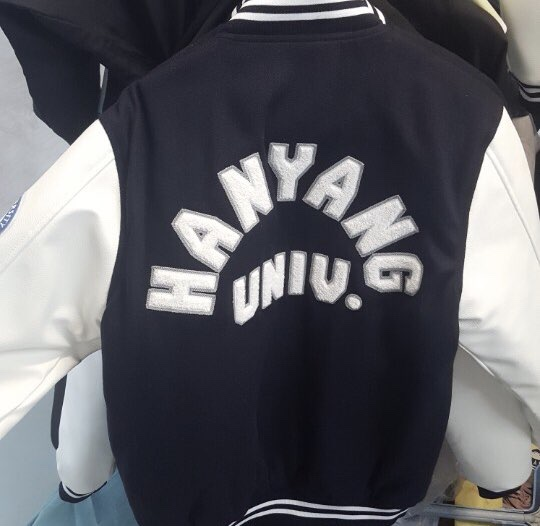
Gwa-jam at Hanyang University

Gwa-jam is a jumper that is usually worn by members of the same major of South Korean universities. There are differences in phrases and colors depending on the major and university. In recent years, there has been a point that it is promoting "academic attention" because it sometimes carries a name of university student's high school. It is a fashion item for university students and plays a role in belonging. Most college students in Korea wear jumpers. the tradition has also spread to high schools themselves, and high school students can be seen wearing them.

== History ==
In the 1860s, the Harvard University baseball team in the United States was wearing jumpers of same design to show solidarity. The university apparel started when other students who saw this were wearing jumpers of their design. The reason why the design of the universal 'gwa-jam' settles in the form of 'baseball jumper' is closely related to this.

In Korea, since the 1980s, they have been making uniforms for the purpose of creating a sense of identity within the department. Especially when the democratization movement in the 1980s peaked, the consciousness of solidarity among the members was so high that they wore uniforms. It was in the late 1990s that it began to be worn as a so-called "Gwa-jam" baseball jumper. It started to wear at the Seoul National University rugby club, and became popular with other athletic and physical education students.

== Composition ==
The universal 'gwa-jam' is a baseball jumper made of artificial leather and melton. 'Gwa-jam' usually shows the name of the university, the major and the student number.

It rarely carries the name of the wearer's high school. The major is distinguished by the color of the sleeve.

Universities, majors, and clubs are slightly different, but the most common design is to put the initial capital letters of the university name on the chest and the student number on the arm. Also, on the back side, write down the name of the Universities in English or scholarly form, then write down 'univ' below it, and write down the name of the major at the bottom. The colors are usually matched in the universities symbol color, but they are sometimes matched to the color of the members' symbols. In recent years, they have been drawing universities flowers on their backs.

== Fashion ==
Spring, the most common season for 'Gwa-jam' is sometimes called 'Gwa-jam season'. 'Gwa-jam' is good to wear on any clothes and warm in the spring weather. In recent years, even long padding for increased warmth. Likewise, the university name, major, and student number are written. In addition to ‘Gwa-jam’ and long padding shape, it also matches with unique design.

'Gwa-jam', a fashion item, goes beyond clubs and clubs to meet clubs and student council. Even a small group like this they wear uniform clothes for belonging feeling.

Recently, high school students also started wearing 'Gwa-jam'. Like universities, they are universally distributed, regardless of their affiliation and singularity / engineering. Starting in 2015, new students started to wear green 'Gwa-jam' at 'Shinil High School', an autonomous private high school in Gangbuk-gu, Seoul. Some students from the student council in 2014 began wearing the red "Gwa-jam" with the school name, and all the students had the same 'Gwa-jam' when they responded well. The 'Gwa-jam' culture, which is worn by university students, is spreading to foreign high schools, independent high schools, and international high schools. It is said that it started from the point of raising the pride of school and strengthening the alliance between the alumni, but it is pointed out that it may fall into 'collective superiority' from high school student.

== Awareness and evaluation ==
=== Positive view ===
'Gwa-jam' is positively evaluated as a sign of belonging and intimacy. Kim Jae-hwi, a professor of psychology at Chung-Ang University, analyzes that 'Gwa-jam' culture is an expression of identity, solidarity, and pride rather than school pride, and a cheap and convenient fashion item. It can also be related to the desire hierarchy theory of "Maslow theory". And that it is the desire to be recognized and belonged to others by wearing 'Gwa-jam' because it is linked to the 'social desire', the third stage of the desire hierarchy theory. In addition, Sungkyunkwan University sociology professor analyzes that it is a natural phenomenon that arises when he is proud of their school.

=== Negative view ===
Since the 2000s, there has been criticism that 'Gwa-jam' promotes culturalism through cultural demonstration and distinction. It is a view that intellectuals who have to act with social consciousness encourage the negative social phenomenon of degreeocracy. In particularly, the prestigious 'Gwa-jam' has a relative deprivation effect on those who do not have a bachelor's degree.
