= Anders Tolhurst =

American baseball player (born 1999)

LG Twins – No. 30
- Pitcher
- Born: September 13, 1999 (age 27); Santee, California, U.S.
- Bats: Right Throws: Right

KBO debut
- August 12, 2025, for the LG Twins

KBO statistics (through August 21, 2026)
- Win–loss record: 17-11
- Earned run average: 4.06
- Strikeouts: 147
- Stats at Baseball Reference

Teams
- LG Twins (2025–present)

Career highlights and awards
- Korean Series champion (2025)

Anders William Tolhurst (born September 13, 1999) is an American professional baseball player. He played in the KBO League as a right-handed pitcher for the LG Twins in 2025.

== College career ==
Tolhurst graduated from Santana High School and attended Grossmont College in El Cajon, California.

== Professional career ==
=== Toronto Blue Jays ===
The Toronto Blue Jays selected Tolhurst in the 23rd round of the 2019 Major League Baseball draft. He did not play in a game in 2020 due to the cancellation of the minor league season because of the COVID-19 pandemic. Prior to the 2021 campaign, Tolhurst suffered a UCL tear, causing him to undergo Tommy John surgery and miss the entirety of the season.

Tolhurst made his professional debut in 2022 with the rookie-level Florida Complex League Blue Jays and the Single-A Dunedin Blue Jays. In 2023, he was with the High-A Vancouver Canadians and the following season, he moved up to the Double-A New Hampshire Fisher Cats. By 2025, Tolhurst played with the Triple-A Buffalo Bisons before being released by the Blue Jays on August 3, 2025. During his time in the Blue Jays organization, he postsed a 4.38 ERA and 92 appearances, including 21 starts with a 15-10 record.

=== LG Twins ===
On August 3, 2025, Tolhurst signed a contract with the LG Twins of the KBO League as a foreign pitcher, replacing Elieser Hernández. In his debut game on August 12, he allowed no runs and seven hits with seven strikeouts to earn his first KBO win as the Twins won against the KT Wiz. He finished the season with a 2.86 ERA, a record of 6-2 and 45 strikeouts as he contributed to the team's regular season title. During the 2025 Korean Series, he was the winning pitcher for Game 1 and 5, contributing to the Twins' Korean Series victory.

On December 6, 2025, Tolhurst re-signed with the Twins on a one-year contract.
