= Yonny Chirinos =

Venezuelan baseball player (born 1993)

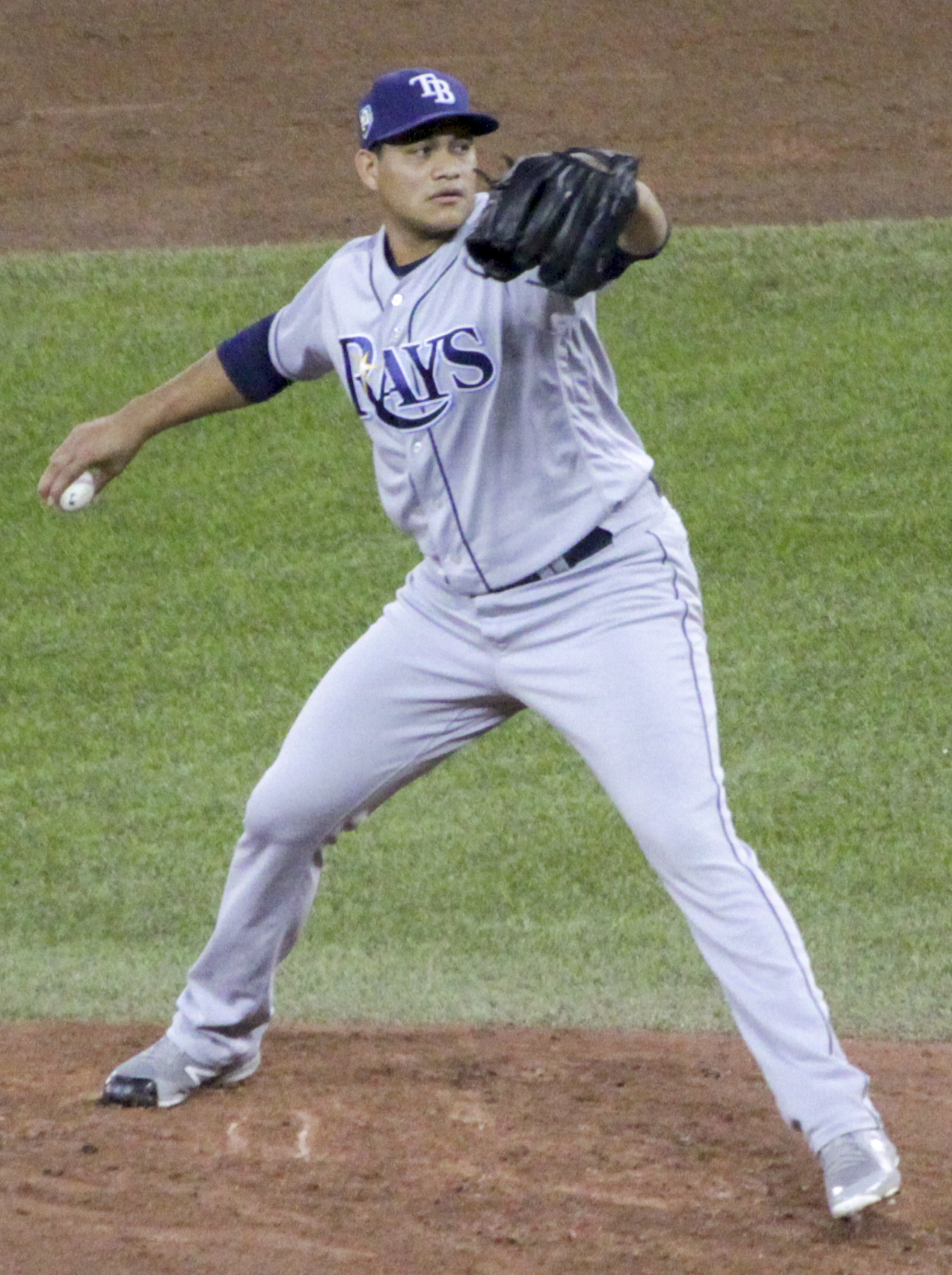
- Chirinos with the Tampa Bay Rays

Free agent
- Pitcher
- Born: December 26, 1993 (age 32); Bachaquero, Venezuela
- Bats: Right Throws: Right

Professional debut
- MLB: April 1, 2018, for the Tampa Bay Rays
- KBO: March 22, 2025, for the LG Twins

MLB statistics (through 2024 season)
- Win–loss record: 20–17
- Earned run average: 4.22
- Strikeouts: 283

KBO statistics (through 2026 season)
- Win–loss record: 15–9
- Earned run average: 3.84
- Strikeouts: 165
- Stats at Baseball Reference

Teams
- Tampa Bay Rays (2018–2020, 2022–2023); Atlanta Braves (2023); Miami Marlins (2024); LG Twins (2025–2026)

Career highlights and awards
- Korean Series champion (2025)

Yonny Enrique Chirinos Mejias (born December 26, 1993) is a Venezuelan professional baseball pitcher who is a free agent. He has previously played in Major League Baseball (MLB) for the Tampa Bay Rays, Atlanta Braves, and Miami Marlins. He has also played in the KBO League for the LG Twins.

== Career ==
=== Tampa Bay Rays ===
==== Minor leagues ====
Chirinos signed with the Tampa Bay Rays for $10,000 as an international free agent from Venezuela on June 29, 2012. He made his professional debut in 2013 with the Venezuelan Summer League Rays and spent the whole season there, pitching to a 3–3 record and 3.27 ERA in 13 games (12 starts). In 2014, he played for the Princeton Rays where he compiled a 3–0 record and 2.09 ERA in 14 games, and in 2015, he pitched for the Charlotte Stone Crabs, Hudson Valley Renegades, and Bowling Green Hot Rods, collecting a combined 5–5 record, 1.82 ERA, and 1.02 WHIP in 15 games (13 starts). Chirinos spent 2016 with Bowling Green, Charlotte, and the Montgomery Biscuits, pitching to a 12–4 record and 3.36 ERA in 29 games. In 2017, Chirinos played for Montgomery and the Durham Bulls. He went 13–5 with a 2.73 ERA and 141 strikeouts and was named the Rays minor league pitcher of the year. On November 20, 2017, the Rays added Chirinos to their 40-man roster to protect him from the Rule 5 draft.

==== Major leagues ====
On March 25, 2018, the Rays announced that Chirinos had made the Opening Day roster. Chirinos made his opening debut in a long relief role against the Boston Red Sox on April 1. He worked four scoreless innings while allowing just one hit. Chirinos set a franchise record by pitching his first 14 2/3 innings without allowing an earned run. On May 1, Chirinos was placed on the 10-day disabled list with a right forearm strain. He was activated from the 10-day disabled list on June 4 but was optioned to Triple-A Durham. On July 24, the Rays recalled Chirinos to start against the New York Yankees. In his return, Chirinos pitched 6 2/3 innings, allowing three runs on six hits. He won for the first time in his major league career on August 9. In 18 games, 7 starts, he finished 5–5 in 89 2/3 innings. The following season, Chirinos split time between the bullpen and the rotation, appearing in 26 games (18 starts). He finished with a 9–5 record in 133 1/3 innings.

On August 21, 2020, it was announced that Chirinos would require Tommy John surgery for an elbow injury, ruling him out for the rest of the 2020 season and likely most of 2021. On August 25, 2020, he underwent the procedure. On February 22, 2021, Chirinos was placed on the 60-day injured list as he continued to recover from the surgery.

On March 22, 2022, Chirinos signed a $1.175 million contract with the Rays, avoiding salary arbitration. Chirinos returned from Tommy John late in the season, and logged two scoreless appearances for the Rays, striking out 6 in 7.0 innings pitched. Chirinos was optioned to the Triple-A Durham Bulls to begin the 2023 season. In 15 appearances (4 starts) for Tampa Bay, he logged a 4–4 record and 4.02 ERA with 31 strikeouts in 62 2/3 innings pitched. On July 17, 2023, Chirinos was designated for assignment by the Rays.

=== Atlanta Braves ===
On July 23, 2023, Chirinos was claimed off waivers by the Atlanta Braves. He made his Braves debut five days later, pitching 3 2/3 innings in a no-decision. Chirinos struggled to a 9.27 ERA across 5 starts for the Braves before he was placed on the injured list with right elbow inflammation on August 21. He was transferred to the 60–day injured list on September 5, ending his season. He was designated for assignment by the Braves on November 14, following the waiver claim of Penn Murfee. He was non-tendered and became a free agent on November 17.

=== Miami Marlins ===
On February 13, 2024, Chirinos agreed to a minor league deal with the Miami Marlins. In 12 starts for the Triple–A Jacksonville Jumbo Shrimp, he compiled a 6–4 record and 3.00 ERA with 47 strikeouts across 66 innings pitched. On June 19, the Marlins selected Chirinos' contract, adding him to their active roster. In 6 starts for Miami, he struggled to a 6.30 ERA with 25 strikeouts across 30 innings of work. Chirinos was designated for assignment by the Marlins on July 23. He cleared waivers and was sent outright to Jacksonville on July 25. Chirinos elected free agency on October 4.

=== LG Twins ===
On November 27, 2024, Chirinos signed a one-year, $1 million contract with the LG Twins of the KBO League. He made 30 starts for the Twins in 2025, posting a 13-6 record and 3.31 ERA with 137 strikeouts over 177 innings of work. With the Twins, Chirinos won the 2025 Korean Series.

On December 6, 2025, Chirinos re-signed with the Twins on a one-year contract. He made eight starts for the team, but struggled to a 2-3 record and 6.68 ERA with 28 strikeouts across 33 2/3 innings pitched. Chirinos was released by the Twins on June 2, 2026.
