= Lee Joon-soo =

South Korean baseball player (born 1988)

Lee Jun-soo
- Catcher
- Born: June 17, 1988 (age 37); Seoul, South Korea
- Bats: Right Throws: Right

KBO debut
- 2012, for the Hanwha Eagles
Korean name
Hangul	이준수
Hanja	李俊秀
RR	I Junsu
MR	I Chunsu

Lee Jun-soo (Korean: 이준수; born June 17, 1988) was the catcher of KT Wiz of the KBO League. He joined Kia Tigers in 2007. After that, he belonged to Hanwha Eagles in 2012, and he moved to KT Wiz in 2017. He graduated Shin-il High school.
