= Hyun-soo Kim =

South Korean baseball player (born 1988)

- Kim with the Orioles 2016

KT Wiz – No. 10
- Left fielder
- Born: January 12, 1988 (age 38); Seoul, South Korea
- Bats: Left Throws: Right

Professional debut
- KBO: September 2, 2006, for the Doosan Bears
- MLB: April 10, 2016, for the Baltimore Orioles

KBO statistics (through May 17, 2026)
- Batting average: .312
- Home runs: 264
- Runs batted in: 1,553

MLB statistics (through 2017 season)
- Batting average: .273
- Home runs: 7
- Runs batted in: 36
- Stats at Baseball Reference

Teams
- Doosan Bears (2006–2015); Baltimore Orioles (2016–2017); Philadelphia Phillies (2017); LG Twins (2018–2025); KT Wiz (2026–present)

Career highlights and awards
- KBO: 5× Golden Glove (2008–2010, 2015, 2020); 2× Batting champion (2008, 2018); 3× Korean Series champion (2015, 2023, 2025); KBO Korean Series MVP (2025); International: All-WBC Team (2009); Premier12 MVP (2015); Premier12 All-World Team (2015); All-Olympic Team (2021)
Medals
Men's baseball
Representing South Korea
Olympic Games
Gold medal – first place	2008 Beijing	Team
World Baseball Classic
Silver medal – second place	2009 Los Angeles	Team
WBSC Premier12
Gold medal – first place	2015 Tokyo	Team

- Hyun-soo Kim
- Hangul: 김현수
- Hanja: 金賢洙
- RR: Gim Hyeonsu
- MR: Kim Hyŏnsu

Hyun-soo Kim (Korean: 김현수; Korean pronunciation: [kim.çʌn.su]; born January 12, 1988) is a South Korean professional baseball outfielder for the KT Wiz of the KBO League. He has previously played in the KBO League for the LG Twins and Doosan Bears, and in Major League Baseball (MLB) for the Baltimore Orioles and Philadelphia Phillies.

== Amateur career ==
Kim attended Shinil High School in Seoul, South Korea. In September 2005, he competed for the South Korea national junior team, that was runner-up at the 6th Asian Junior Baseball Championship in Seoul, South Korea. At the championship, he went 1-for-4 as a backup outfielder in the South Korean roster.

In November 2005, Kim won the Lee Yeong-min Award, given annually to the most outstanding high school hitter in South Korea.

== Professional career ==
=== Doosan Bears ===
Upon graduation from high school, Kim made himself eligible for the 2006 KBO First-Year Player Draft, but went undrafted. Instead, he was signed by the Doosan Bears as an undrafted free agent. He spent the whole 2006 season playing for the reserve team of the Bears.

In the 2007 season, Kim took over the starting job after starting outfielder Yoo Jae-woong was sidelined with a sprained ankle in the beginning of the season. Kim hit .273 with 5 home runs and 32 runs batted in in 99 games, and finished runner-up for Rookie of the Year.

In the 2008 KBO season, Kim won the batting title with an average of .357 and was first in hits with 168. He finished runner-up in MVP voting and won the Golden Glove Award as an outfielder.

In the 2009 KBO season, Kim exploded offensively, batting .357 and smacking 23 home runs. He defended his hit title with 172, and was runner-up in RBI (104) and triples (6), third in batting average, runs (97), doubles (31), on-base percentage (.448) and slugging percentage (.589), and eleventh in home runs.

On December 11, 2009, he won the KBO Golden Glove Award for outfielder for two consecutive years.

=== Baltimore Orioles ===
On December 23, 2015, Kim signed a two-year, $7 million contract with the Baltimore Orioles.

After struggling in spring training, Kim ultimately made the team after refusing a minor league assignment which led to him being booed on Opening Day. On April 10, 2016, Kim played his first career MLB game versus the Tampa Bay Rays. In that game he had two hits and scored a run. Kim finished his first month of Major League baseball having played in only six games, but making an impact, going 9-for-15 (.600), driving in one run, scoring two runs, and having an on-base percentage of .647. He hit his First Major League Career home run on May 29, against the Cleveland Indians that broke a 4–4 tie in the 7th inning.

On June 30, Kim hit the Orioles' 56th home run in the month of June, setting a new Major League record for the month.

On September 25, Kim hit a 2-run home run in the second inning of a game against the Arizona Diamondbacks. The O's would win the game 2–1, proving his homer to be the game winner. Three days later, on September 28, Kim hit a 2-run home run in the ninth inning of a game against the Toronto Blue Jays. The Orioles were facing a 2–1 deficit at the time and Kim hit the go ahead, game-winning home run on the ninth pitch of his at-bat. The Orioles would go on to win the game 3–2. Kim ended his 2016 season with a .302 batting average.

=== Philadelphia Phillies ===
On July 28, 2017, the Orioles traded Kim and Garrett Cleavinger to the Philadelphia Phillies in exchange for Jeremy Hellickson. Kim made 40 appearances for Philadelphia, batting .230/.309/.299 with four RBI.

=== LG Twins ===
On December 19, 2017, Kim signed a four-year, $10.7 million contract with the LG Twins. He made 117 appearances for the team in 2018, batting .362/.415/.589 with 20 home runs and 101 RBI.

Kim made 140 appearances for LG in 2021, hitting .285/.376/.435 with 17 home runs and 96 RBI. On December 17, 2021, Kim re-signed with the Twins on a six-year, $9.7 million contract.

In 2025, Kim played in 140 games for the Twins, slashing .298/.384/.422 with 12 home runs and 90 RBI. With the team, Kim won the 2025 Korean Series, and was named the Series MVP.

=== KT Wiz ===
On November 25, 2025, Kim signed with the KT Wiz of the KBO League.

== International career ==
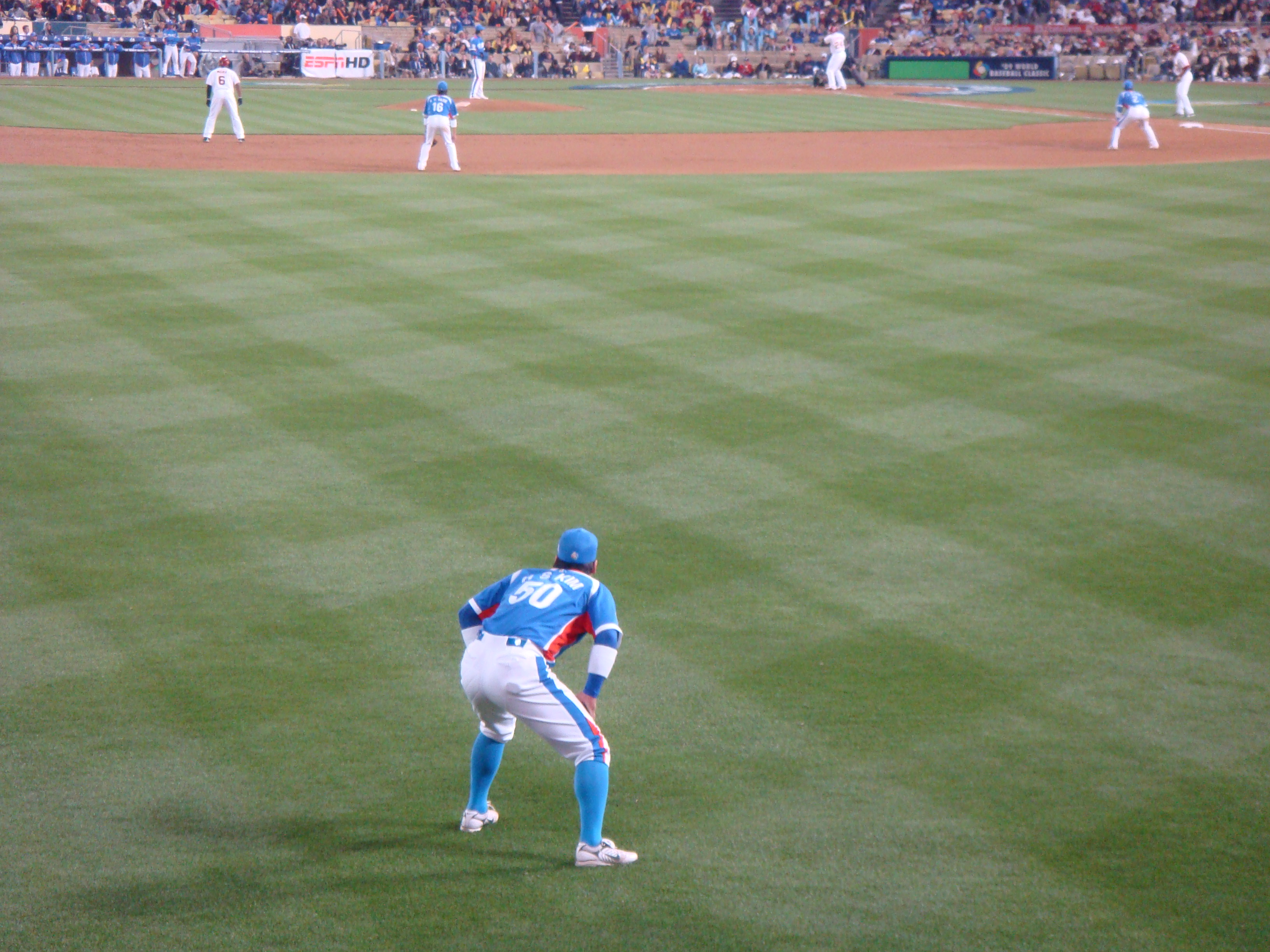
Kim in the outfield during the 2009 World Baseball Classic for the South Korea national baseball team.

In August 2008, Kim competed for the South Korea national baseball team in the 2008 Olympic Games, where they won the gold medal in the baseball tournament. In the preliminary round game against Japan, Kim hit a go-ahead RBI single in the top of the ninth off closer Iwase Hitoki to break a 2–2 tie as a pinch hitter, leading South Korea to a 5–3 win over Japan.

In March 2009, Kim competed for the South Korea national baseball team in the 2009 World Baseball Classic, where they finished runner-up with a 6–3 record. In the tournament, he went 11-for-28 (.393) with 4 RBIs, 6 runs and 7 walks, and was named to the All-Star team at designated hitter. He played for Korea again in the 2013 World Baseball Classic, going 3 for 12 in Korea's three games.

Kim did not play for South Korea national baseball team in the 2017 World Baseball Classic, instead wanting to focus on getting ready for the 2017 MLB season with the Baltimore Orioles.

In 2018, he represented South Korea at the 2018 Asian Games, helping Korea to win Gold.

Year	Venue	Competition	Team	Individual note
2005	South Korea	Asian Junior Baseball Championship	Silver medal	.250 BA (1-for-4)
2008	China	Olympic Games	Gold medal	.370 BA (10-for-27), 4 RBI, 3 R, 2 SB
2009	United States	World Baseball Classic	Silver medal	.393 BA (11-for-28), 4 RBI, 6 R, 7 BB; All-Star (DH)
2010	China	Asian Games	Gold medal	.556 BA (10-for-18), 5 RBI, 2 BB
2013	Chinese Taipei	World Baseball Classic	9th	.250 BA (3-for-12), 2 RBI, 1 BB
2014	South Korea	Asian Games	Gold medal	.421 BA (8-for-19), 4 RBI, 7 R, 4 BB
2015	Japan	Premier12	Gold medal	.344 BA (11-for-32), 13 RBI, 4 R, 1 SB; MVP, All-Star (OF)
2018	Indonesia	Asian Games	Gold medal	.143 BA (3-for-21), 2 RBI, 2 R, 3 BB

== Awards and honors ==
KBO

- 2008 KBO Golden Glove Award (Outfielder)
- 2009 KBO Golden Glove Award (Outfielder)
- 2010 KBO Golden Glove Award (Outfielder)
- 2015 KBO Golden Glove Award (Outfielder)

== Achievements ==
KBO

- 2008 Batting Title
- 2008 On-base Percentage Title
- 2008 Hit Title
- 2009 Hit Title

== See also ==
- List of KBO career hits leaders
- List of KBO career home run leaders
- List of KBO career RBI leaders
