= Southern Miss Golden Eagles baseball seasons =

University of Southern Mississippi sports

The Southern Miss Golden Eagles baseball team has represented The University of Southern Mississippi over 104 seasons, dating back to its inception in 1913. The Golden Eagles are a founding member of Conference USA.

== Year-by-Year ==
Year	Conference	Season Records				Post-Season Appearance	Post-Season Record
Year	Conference	Overall W-L	Win %	Conf. W-L	Conf. %	Post-Season Appearance	Post-Season Record
1913	Independent	1-3	.250				
1914	Independent	1-0	1.00				
1915	Independent	0-1	.000				
1916	Independent	1-1	.500				
1917—1918	Independent	Did Not Play					
1919	Independent	2-3	.400				
1920	Independent	8-2	.800				
1921	Independent	5-1-1	.786				
1922	Independent	11-7-1	.605				
1923	Independent	9-2-1	.792				
1924	Independent	0-3	.000				
1925	Independent	4-2	.667				
1926	Independent	5-2-1	.688				
1927	Independent	4-4	.500				
1928	Independent	6-2	.750				
1929	Independent	1-9	.100				
1930	Independent	2-11	.154				
1931—1933	Independent	Did Not Play					
1934	Independent	3-9	.250				
1935	Independent	0-3	.000				
1936—1946	Independent	Did Not Play					
1947	Independent	9-4	.692				
1948	Independent	11-11	.500				
1949	Gulf States Conference	10-10	.500	6-5	.545		
1950	Gulf States Conference	5-6	.455	5-5	.500		
1951	Gulf States Conference	7-6-1	.536	7-5	.584		
1952	Gulf States Conference	6-5	.545	6-5	.545		
1953	Independent	9-1	.900				
1954	Independent	10-2	.834				
1955	Independent	7-4	.636				
1956	Independent	7-8-1	.469				
1957	Independent	4-8	.333				
1958	Independent	7-7	.500				
1959	Independent	10-5	.667				
1960	Independent	14-3	.824				
1961	Independent	12-7	.632				
1962	Independent	8-7-1	.531				
1963	Independent	10-12-1	.457				
1964	Independent	15-5	.750				
1965	Independent	15-4	.789				
1966	Independent	9-11	.450				
1967	Independent	9-13	.409				
1968	Independent	8-12	.400				
1969	Independent	3-13	.188				
1970	Independent	10-13	.435				
1971	Independent	17-10	.630				
1972	Independent	12-16	.429				
1973	Independent	12-12	.500				
1974	Independent	16-12	.571				
1975	Independent	15-16	.484				
1976	Independent	20-21	.488				
1977	Independent	17-16	.515				
1978	Independent	15-24	.385				
1979	Independent	13-21	.382				
1980	Independent	17-13	.567				
1981	Independent	23-26	.469				
1982	Independent	9-24	.273				
1983	Metropolitan Collegiate Athletic Conference	11-33	.334	0-6	.000		
1984	Metropolitan Collegiate Athletic Conference	13-36-2	.275	1-11	.083		
1985	Metropolitan Collegiate Athletic Conference	28-41	.406	5-12	.294		
1986	Metropolitan Collegiate Athletic Conference	31-30	.508	6-15	.286		
1987	Metropolitan Collegiate Athletic Conference	37-25	.597	7-11	.389		
1988	Metropolitan Collegiate Athletic Conference	36-26	.581	9-6	.600		
1989	Metropolitan Collegiate Athletic Conference	36-26	.581	8-7	.534		
1990	Metropolitan Collegiate Athletic Conference	42-25	.627	16-5	.762	NCAA Regional	1-2
1991	Metropolitan Collegiate Athletic Conference	42-24	.636	15-6	.714	NCAA Regional	0-2
1992	Metropolitan Collegiate Athletic Conference	31-28	.525	9-9	.500		
1993	Metropolitan Collegiate Athletic Conference	33-26	.559	9-6	.600		
1994	Metropolitan Collegiate Athletic Conference	37-24	.607	11-7	.611		
1995	Metropolitan Collegiate Athletic Conference	36-24	.600	11-7	.611		
1996	Conference USA	32-28	.533	14-10	.583		
1997	Conference USA	34-23	.596	16-10	.615		
1998	Conference USA	30-28	.517	12-15	.444		
1999	Conference USA	40-23	.635	18-9	.667	NCAA Regional	2-2
2000	Conference USA	32-26	.552	15-10	.600		
2001	Conference USA	27-32	.458	11-16	.407		
2002	Conference USA	36-22	.621	18-11	.621		
2003	Conference USA	47-16	.750	23-7	.767	Conference Tournament Champion, NCAA Regional Host	2-2
2004	Conference USA	45-19	.703	21-9	.750	NCAA Regional	1-2
2005	Conference USA	41-21	.661	20-10	.667	NCAA Regional	0-2
2006	Conference USA	39-23	.629	13-11	.542	NCAA Regional	1-2
2007	Conference USA	38-21	.644	14-10	.583	NCAA Regional	1-2
2008	Conference USA	42-22	.656	15-9	.625	NCAA Regional	2-2
2009	Conference USA	40-26	.606	12-12	.500	NCAA Regional, NCAA Super Regional, College World Series	3-1, 2-0, 0-2
2010	Conference USA	36-24	.600	14-10	.583	Conference Tournament Champion, NCAA Regional	1-2
2011	Conference USA	39-19	.672	16-8	.667	NCAA Regional	0-2
2012	Conference USA	32-24	.571	14-10	.583		
2013	Conference USA	30-27	.526	15-9	.625		
2014	Conference USA	35-25	.583	19-11	.633		
2015	Conference USA	36-18-1	.667	19-10	.655		
2016	Conference USA	41-20	.672	20-10	.667	Conference Tournament Champion, NCAA Regional	1-2
2017	Conference USA	50-16	.758	25-5	.833	NCAA Regional Host	2-2
2018	Conference USA	44-18	.710	23-6	.793	Conference Champions, NCAA Regional	1-2
2019	Conference USA	40-21	.656	20-10	.667	Conference Champions, NCAA Regional	2-2
2020	Conference USA	12-4	.750	N/A	N/A	N/A	N/A
2021	Conference USA	40-21	.656	22-9	.710	NCAA Regional	3-2
2022	Conference USA	47-19	.712	23-7	.767	NCAA Regional Host, NCAA Super Regional Host	3-1, 0-2
2023	Sun Belt Conference	46-20	.697	22-8	.733	Conference Tournament Champions, NCAA Regional, NCAA Super Regional Host	4-1, 1-2
2024	Sun Belt Conference	43-20	.683	20-10	.667	Conference Tournament Champions, NCAA Regional	2-2
2025	Sun Belt Conference	47-16	.746	24-6	.800	NCAA Regional Host	3-2
