= Park Dong-won =

South Korean baseball player (born 1990)

LG Twins – No. 27
- Catcher
- Born: April 7, 1990 (age 36); Busan, South Korea
- Bats: Right Throws: Right

KBO debut
- May 17, 2010, for the Heroes

KBO statistics (through 2025)
- Batting average: .256
- Home runs: 176
- Runs batted in: 695
- Stats at Baseball Reference

Teams
- Seoul/Nexen/Kiwoom Heroes (2010, 2013–2022); Kia Tigers (2022); LG Twins (2023–present)

Career highlights and awards
- KBO All-Star Game MVP (2025); 2× Korean Series champion (2023, 2025)

Park Dong-won (Korean: 박동원; Hanja: 朴東原; born April 7, 1990) is a South Korean professional baseball catcher for the LG Twins of the KBO League. He has previously played for the Kiwoom Heroes and the Kia Tigers.

== Professional career ==
=== Kiwoom Heroes ===
Park was drafted by the Heroes in 2009 as the third overall pick in the second round, and was first promoted to the first team in 2010. After appearing in seven games for the first team in 2010, he was selected for the Sangmu draft and enlisted in the military.

When he returned from military service in 2012, new manager Youm Kyoung-youb announced before the season that Park would be promoted to starting catcher for the 2013 season. A promising catcher with high expectations for the team, he participated in closing camp, spring training, and exhibition games alongside the existing catchers. On March 9, he hit a two-RBI single in an exhibition game. On April 24, backup catchers Choi Kyung-cheol and Seo Dong-wook were traded, and Park became the team's starting catcher. On May 15, 2013, he hit his first home run in his debut against Yoo Chang-sik in a game against the Hanwha Eagles.

During the 2016 season, Park received rave reviews for his stolen base percentage of over .400. However, he was unable to maintain his strong performance from the beginning of the season and his batting average dropped, recording the lowest batting average among players who met the required plate appearances. After the season, he signed a contract worth 200 million won, a 42.9% increase.

=== Kia Tigers ===
On April 24, 2022, Park was traded to the Kia Tigers in exchange for Kim Tae-jin, in a 1:1 trade that included a second-round pick in the 2023 KBO League Rookie Draft and 1 billion won in compensation.

=== LG Twins ===
On November 21, 2022, Park signed a free agent contract with the LG Twins for a total of 6.5 billion won, including a four-year contract, a signing bonus of 2 billion won, and a total annual salary of 4.5 billion won. In his first season with the team, he won his first Korean Series in 2023, in which the Twins defeated the KT Wiz 4–1 in five games.

In 2025, Park was selected to the All-Star. Representing the winning team Nanum, he played in the All-Star Game with one home run, three hits and RBIs, winning the game's MVP. The Twins won their record-extending 4th Korean Series title, beating the Eagles 4-1, thus giving Park his second Korean Series championship.

== International career ==
Park represented the South Korea national baseball team at the 2026 World Baseball Classic.
