= 2025 Korean Series =

Professional baseball championship in South Korea

- 2025 Shinhan SOL Bank Korean Series
Team (Wins)	Managers	Season
LG Twins (4)	Youm Kyoung-youb	85–56–3 (.603)
Hanwha Eagles (1)	Kim Kyung-moon	83–57–4 (.593)
- Dates: October 26 – October 31
- Venues: Jamsil Baseball Stadium; Daejeon Hanwha Life Ballpark
- MVP: Kim Hyun-soo (LG)
- Umpires: Chun Il-soo, Kim Sung-chul, Park Ki-taek, Park Joong-chul, Park Geun-young, Kim Jeong-guk, Choi Soowon

Broadcast
- Television: KBS (South Korea – Korean); MBC (South Korea – Korean); SBS (South Korea – Korean)
- TV announcers: Lee Ho-geun, Cha Woo-chan and Park Yong-taik (KBS); Jeong Woo-young and Lee Soon-Cheol (SBS); Kim Na-jin, Jung Min-cheul and Park Jae-hong (MBC)

The 2025 Korean Series, (known as the 2025 Shinhan SOL Bank Korean Series for sponsorship reasons) was the championship series of the KBO League for the 2025 season. The 44th edition of the Korean Series, it featured the LG Twins and Hanwha Eagles. The LG Twins, who had best record during the regular season, received three round byes and a direct berth into the Series, while the Hanwha Eagles, who had the second best record, received two round byes and defeated the Samsung Lions in the semifinals to reach the Series. The defending 2024 Korean Series champions Kia Tigers did not qualify for the 2025 postseason tournament.

The Twins won their 4th Korean Series title, beating the Eagles 4–1.

== Summary ==
Twins won the series, 4–1.

Game	Date	Score	Location	Time	Attendance
1	October 26, 2025	Hanwha Eagles – 2, LG Twins – 8	Jamsil Baseball Stadium	2:55	23,750
2	October 27, 2025	Hanwha Eagles – 5, LG Twins – 13	Jamsil Baseball Stadium	3:08	23,750
3	October 29, 2025	LG Twins – 3, Hanwha Eagles – 7	Daejeon Hanwha Life Ballpark	3:14	16,750
4	October 30, 2025	LG Twins – 7, Hanwha Eagles – 4	Daejeon Hanwha Life Ballpark	3:24	16,750
5	October 31, 2025	LG Twins – 4, Hanwha Eagles – 1	Daejeon Hanwha Life Ballpark	3:05	16,750

== Matchups and linescores ==
=== Game 1 ===
October 26, 2025 14:00 KST at Jamsil Baseball Stadium
Team	1	2	3	4	5	6	7	8	9	R	H	E
Hanwha Eagles	0	0	0	0	0	2	0	0	0	2	7	1
LG Twins (Winner)	2	0	0	0	2	4	0	0	X	8	7	0
Starting pitchers: Hanwha: Moon Dong-ju; LG: Anders Tolhurst; WP: Anders Tolhurst (1–0) LP: Moon Dong-ju (0–1); Home runs: Hanwha: None; LG: Park Hae-min (1, Solo, 5th BOT, Moon Dong-ju); Attendance: 23,750; Umpires: Chun Il-soo, Kim Sung-chul, Park Ki-taek, Park Joong-chul, Park Geun-young, Kim Jeong-guk; Boxscore

=== Game 2 ===
October 27, 2025 18:30 KST at Jamsil Baseball Stadium
Team	1	2	3	4	5	6	7	8	9	R	H	E
Hanwha Eagles	4	0	0	1	0	0	0	0	0	5	6	1
LG Twins (Winner)	0	5	2	3	0	0	1	2	X	13	11	1
Starting pitchers: Hanwha: Ryu Hyun-jin; LG: Lim Chan-kyu; WP: Kim Jin-sung (1–0) LP: Ryu Hyun-jin (0–1); Home runs: Hanwha: Moon Hyun-bin (3, 2 Run, 1st TOP, Im Chan-kyu), Roh Si-hwan (3, Solo, 1st TOP, Im Chan-kyu); LG: Park Dong-won (1, 2 Run, 3rd BOT, Ryu Hyun-jin), Moon Bo-gyeong (1, 2 Run, 8rd BOT, Jeong Woo-joo); Attendance: 23,750; Umpires: Kim Jeong-guk, Park Joong-chul, Kim Sung-chul, Park Geun-young, Choi Soowon, Park Ki-taek; Boxscore

=== Game 3 ===
October 29, 2025 18:30 KST at Daejeon Hanwha Life Ballpark
Team	1	2	3	4	5	6	7	8	9	R	H	E
LG Twins	0	0	1	1	0	0	0	1	0	3	6	1
Hanwha Eagles (Winner)	0	1	0	0	0	0	0	6	X	7	10	1
Starting pitchers: LG: Son Ju-young; Hanwha: Cody Ponce; WP: Kim Seo-hyeon (1–0) LP: You Young-chan (0–1); Home runs: LG: Kim Hyun-soo (1, Solo, 4th TOP, Cody Ponce); Hanwha: None; Attendance: 16,750; Umpires: Park Ki-taek, Park Geun-young, Park Joong-chul, Choi Soowon, Chun Il-soo, Kim Sung-chul; Boxscore

=== Game 4 ===
October 30, 2025 18:30 KST at Daejeon Hanwha Life Ballpark
Team	1	2	3	4	5	6	7	8	9	R	H	E
LG Twins (Winner)	0	0	0	0	0	0	0	1	6	7	11	1
Hanwha Eagles	0	0	0	1	0	0	2	1	0	4	8	0
Starting pitchers: LG: Yonny Chirinos; Hanwha: Ryan Weiss; WP: Lee Jung-yong (1–0) LP: Park Sang-won (0–1) Sv: You Young-chan (1); Home runs: LG: Park Dong-won (2, 2 Run, 9th TOP, Kim Seo-hyeon); Hanwha: None; Attendance: 16,750; Umpires: Kim Sung-chul, Choi Soowon, Park Ki-taek, Chun Il-soo, Kim Jeong-guk, Park Joong-chul; Boxscore

=== Game 5 ===
October 31, 2025 18:30 KST at Daejeon Hanwha Life Ballpark
Team	1	2	3	4	5	6	7	8	9	R	H	E
LG Twins (Winner)	1	0	1	0	0	1	0	0	1	4	12	0
Hanwha Eagles	0	1	0	0	0	0	0	0	0	1	5	1
Starting pitchers: LG: Anders Tolhurst; Hanwha: Moon Dong-ju; WP: Anders Tolhurst (2–0) LP: Jeong Woo-joo (0–1) Sv: You Young-chan (2); Home runs: LG: None; Hanwha: None; Attendance: 16,750; Umpires: Park Joong-chul, Chun Il-soo, Choi Soowon, Kim Jeong-guk, Park Ki-taek, Park Geun-young; Boxscore

== See also ==
- 2025 Japan Series
- 2025 World Series
