= 2025 KBO League season =

Professional baseball season in South Korea

2025 KBO League
- 2025 신한 SOL Bank KBO 리그
- Association: KBO
- League: KBO League
- Sport: Baseball
- Defending champions: Kia Tigers (2024)
- Hosts: Shinhan Bank
- Duration: March 22 – September 30
- Games: 144 per team
- Teams: 10
- Total attendance: 12,245,426
- Average attendance: 17,103
- TV partner(s): KBS, MBC, SBS & SPOTV
- Streaming partner(s): TVING (South Korea); SOOP Live (International)

Regular Season
- Season champions: LG Twins | 85–56–3 (.603)
- Second place: Hanwha Eagles | 83–57–4 (.593)
- Third place: SSG Landers | 75–65–4 (.536)
- Fourth place: Samsung Lions | 74–68–2 (.521)
- Fifth place: NC Dinos | 71–67–6 (.514)
- Season MVP: Cody Ponce (Hanwha)

Preseason
- First place: KT Wiz
- Runners-up: Hanwha Eagles

All-Star Game
- 2025 KBO All-Stars: Nanum All-Stars
- Runners-up: Dream All-Stars
- Season MVP: Park Dong-won (LG)

Postseason
- Wild Card champions: Samsung Lions
- Wild Card runners-up: NC Dinos
- Semi-playoff champions: Samsung Lions
- Semi-playoff runners-up: SSG Landers
- Playoff champions: Hanwha Eagles
- Playoff runners-up: Samsung Lions

Korean Series
- Date: October 26 - October 31
- Venue: Jamsil Baseball Stadium; Daejeon Hanwha Life Ballpark
- Champions: LG Twins (4th title)
- Runners-up: Hanwha Eagles
- Finals MVP: Kim Hyun-soo (LG)

KBO League seasons
- ← 2024 2026 →

The 2025 KBO League season, officially known as the 2025 Shinhan SOL Bank KBO League (Korean: 2025 신한 SOL Bank KBO 리그) for sponsorship reasons, was a professional baseball season based in South Korea; the 44th in the history of the KBO League. The league's format and makeup did not change in the 2025 season from the previous season, with the same ten teams competing; the Kia Tigers, Doosan Bears, Lotte Giants, NC Dinos, LG Twins, Hanwha Eagles, KT Wiz, Samsung Lions, SSG Landers, and the Kiwoom Heroes.

The Eagles and Bears changed their branding and cap insignia prior to the season. The Eagles also moved to a new stadium, Daejeon Hanwha Life Ballpark.

The Tigers entered the season as the defending champions from the 2024 season.

== Rules ==
The Korea Baseball Organization announced rule changes for the 2025 season, including the pitch clock and the Automated Ball-Strike System (ABS). The KBO will implement the pitch clock starting in the regular season, with pitchers starting their delivery within 20 seconds with the bases empty and 25 seconds with runners on. The league will also have a 33-second limit between trips to the plate for batters, with only two timeouts per plate appearance. The KBO will not have a limit on the number of disengagements for pitchers, a departure from the MLB's two-pickoffs rule. The ABS was readjusted in 2025, with the top and bottom units lowered without changes to the size of the zone.

== Events ==
=== MLB ===
On January 3, 2025, Hye-seong Kim (2B) of the Heroes signed a three-year, $12.5 million deal with the Los Angeles Dodgers of Major League Baseball. The contract has an option for the 2028-29 season that could increase the amount to $22 million. He was optioned to the Dodgers' AAA affiliate, the Oklahoma City Comets, as he struggled in spring training. On May 3, Kim was called up to the MLB and made his debut as a pinch runner against the Braves.

Kim finished his rookie season with a .280 batting average, three home runs, along with 17 RBIs.

=== Changwon NC Park incident ===
On March 30, a game between the Twins and the Dinos at Changwon NC Park was postponed due to a small collapse of the stadium's structure. A few fans lining up for the game were injured. The next day, a young woman who was treated for a concussion died. The KBO canceled all April 1 league games to mourn. They resumed four games on April 2, but several future games at NC Park were postponed further for stadium repair.

On April 9, the NC Dinos announced a general meeting with the joint task force on the incident. Changwon City and Changwon Facilities Management Corporation were involved.

=== Records ===
On September 25, Lewin Díaz (1B) of the Lions broke South Korean baseball's single season RBI record when he drove in a run with a double against the Heroes in the bottom of the fifth inning a in Daegu for his 147th RBI of the season. With 49 home runs, Díaz set another KBO record: the most home runs by a foreign player in a season. Díaz surpassed former Lion Yamaico Navarro who had 48 in 2015.

On September 30, Díaz achieved the KBO's first 50-home-run, 150-RBI season vs. the Tigers with a three-run home run.

=== Retirements ===
Oh Seung-hwan, RP – Samsung Lions

On August 7, it was announced that the 2025 season would be Oh Seung-hwan's final season in professional baseball. Oh, who spent 21 years in the KBO, NPB, MLB from 2005 to 2025, played with the Samsung Lions, Tigers, Cardinals, Blue Jays and Rockies. The Lions retired his number (21), and announced in his retirement ceremony on September 30 that the entrance gate on the third base side of Daegu Samsung Lions Park would be renamed "Gate 21" to honor his legacy.

== Preseason ==
These are the final preseason standings.

The preseason started on March 8 and ended on March 18.

Preseason standings
Rank	Team	GP	W	L	D	PCT	GB	WS	Home	Road
1	KT Wiz	7	6	1	0	.857	-	W3	4–0–1	4–0–1
2	Hanwha Eagles	8	5	2	1	.714	1	W5	1–0–2	4–1–0
3	Kia Tigers	8	4	2	2	.667	1.5	W4	2–0–0	2–2–2
3	Kiwoom Heroes	10	6	3	1	.667	1	W3	3–1–0	3–0–3
5	LG Twins	9	4	5	0	.444	3	W1	1–0–0	3–0–5
6	Doosan Bears	9	3	4	2	.429	3	L4	0–1–1	3–1–3
7	SSG Landers	8	3	5	0	.375	3.5	W1	2–0–4	1–0–1
8	Samsung Lions	8	3	6	0	.333	4	L4	3–0–3	0–0–3
8	Lotte Giants	8	2	4	2	.333	3.5	L3	2–2–2	0–0–2
10	NC Dinos	8	2	6	0	.250	4.5	L5	2–0–5	0–0–1

== Regular season ==
The regular season of the 2025 season began on March 22 and ended on September 30. Each team played 144 games, facing every other team 16 times. Regular season games were played every day except Mondays.

=== Standings ===
These are the final 2025 KBO League regular season standings.

Regular season standings
Rank	Team	GP	W	L	D	PCT	GB	STRK	Home	Road	Postseason
1	LG Twins	144	85	56	3	0.603	—	L3	41–1–29	44–2–27	Korean Series
2	Hanwha Eagles	144	83	57	4	0.593	1.5	L1	44–2–27	39–2–30	Playoff
3	SSG Landers	144	75	65	4	0.536	9.5	L2	38–4–31	37–0–34	Semi-playoff
4	Samsung Lions	144	74	68	2	0.521	11.5	L1	41–0–30	33–2–38	Wild Card
5	NC Dinos	144	71	67	6	0.514	12.5	W9	36–1–34	35–5–33	Wild Card
6	KT Wiz	144	71	68	5	0.511	13	W1	36–2–35	35–3–33	Did not qualify
7	Lotte Giants	144	66	72	6	0.478	17.5	L3	35–4–34	31–2–38	Did not qualify
8	Kia Tigers	144	65	75	4	0.464	19.5	W2	35–2–34	30–2–41	Did not qualify
9	Doosan Bears	144	61	77	6	0.442	22.5	W2	29–4–40	32–2–37	Did not qualify
10	Kiwoom Heroes	144	47	93	4	0.336	37.5	L5	23–2–46	24–2–47	Did not qualify

Note: Draw results are ignored by the league when calculating win percentage and games behind.

== All-Star Game ==
Like in previous all-star games, the ten KBO teams are divided into two All-Star teams: the Nanum All-Stars (나눔) and the Dream All-Stars (드림). The game will be hosted at Daejeon Hanwha Life Ballpark, the Eagles' new home stadium. The all-star game will be on July 12, and the Futures All-Star Game will be on the 11th.

2025 KBO All-Star Teams
Team	All-Star Team
Samsung Lions	Dream All-Stars
Doosan Bears	Dream All-Stars
KT Wiz	Dream All-Stars
SSG Landers	Dream All-Stars
Lotte Giants	Dream All-Stars
Kia Tigers	Nanum All-Stars
LG Twins	Nanum All-Stars
Hanwha Eagles	Nanum All-Stars
NC Dinos	Nanum All-Stars
Kiwoom Heroes	Nanum All-Stars

The starting players (candidates) from each team are voted by fans and KBO players, which leads to a score. The players with the highest score are selected.

The most voted infielders and pitchers within their position group play in the game. The top 3 outfielders play in available positions, regardless if they are all on the same team.

The teams who appeared in the previous year's Korean Series provide their manager respectively for their all-star team.

Other players in the all-star vote may also appear later in the all-star game.

=== Projected Dream All-Stars Lineup ===
Manager: Park Jin-man (Samsung Lions)

Dream All-Stars Batting
#	Player	No.	Pos.	Team	BA	AB	R	H	HR	RBI	BB	SO	HBP	Votes	PV	Score
1	Koo Ja-wook	5	LF	Samsung	0.500	4	1	2	0	1	0	1	0	1,546,925	160	44.32
	Park Yeong-hyun	60	P	KT	0.000	1	0	0	0	0	0	1	0	-		
2	Víctor Reyes	29	RF	Lotte	0.333	3	1	1	0	1	0	1	0	1,273,504	180	40.60
	Jang Sung-woo	22	PH, LF	KT	0.000	2	0	0	0	0	0	0	0	-		
3	Choi Jeong	14	3B	SSG	1.000	2	1	1	0	0	0	0	1	1,301,246	162	39.62
	Bae Jung-dae	27	PH, CF	KT	0.500	2	0	1	0	0	0	0	0	-		
4	Lewin Díaz	0	1B	Samsung	0.500	4	0	2	0	1	0	0	0	1,485,508	241	50.00
5	Jeon Jun-woo	8	DH	Lotte	0.000	1	0	0	0	0	0	1	0	1,482,247	71	35.45
	Oh Myeong-jin	6	PH, DH, 3B	Doosan	0.333	3	1	1	0	0	0	0	0	-		
6	Ahn Hyun-min	23	CF, RF	KT	0.500	4	1	2	1	2	1	0	0	-		
7	Ryu Ji-hyuk	16	2B	Samsung	0.000	2	0	0	0	0	0	0	0	-		
	Kwon Dong-jin	52	PH, 2B	KT	0.500	2	0	1	0	0	0	0	0	-		
8	Kang Min-ho	47	C	Samsung	0.000	1	0	0	0	0	0	0	0	1,591,268	139	43.41
	Cho Hyeong-woo	20	C	SSG	0.000	3	0	0	0	0	0	1	0	-		
9	Jeon Min-jae	13	SS	Lotte	0.500	4	1	2	0	0	0	0	0	1,579,413	178	46.50

Dream All-Stars Pitching
Player	No.	Pos.	Team	ERA	IP	NP	ER	HR	SO	BB	HB	Votes	PV	Score
Park Se-woong	21	SP	Lotte	36.00	1.0	29	4	1	1	0	8	-		
Bae Chan-seung	55	RP	Samsung	0.00	1.0	10	0	0	1	0	3	1,102,268	129	32.86
Kim Won-jung	34	CP	Lotte	X	X	X	X	X	X	X	X	1,514,509	63	35.41

=== Projected Nanum All-Stars Lineup ===
Manager: Lee Bum-ho (Kia Tigers)

Nanum All-Stars Batting
#	Player	No.	Pos.	Team	BA	AB	R	H	HR	RBI	BB	SO	HBP	Votes	PV	Score
1	Moon Hyun-bin	51	DH	Hanwha	0.333	3	1	1	0	0	0	0	1	-		
	Kim Tae-gun	42	PH, DH	Kia	1.000	1	1	1	1	1	0	0	0	-		
2	Park Min-woo	2	2B	NC	1.000	1	1	1	0	0	0	0	0	1,215,838	171	38.69
	Lee Do-yun	7	PH, 2B	Hanwha	0.500	4	1	2	0	1	0	0	0	-		
3	Park Kun-woo	37	OF	NC	0.500	2	1	1	0	0	1	1	0	1,408,171	165	41.99
	Kim Hyun-soo	22	PH, RF	LG	0.000	1	0	0	0	0	0	0	0	-		
4	Song Sung-mun	24	3B	Kiwoom	0.250	4	0	1	0	1	0	0	0	-		
5	Chae Eun-seong	22	1B	Hanwha	0.333	3	1	1	0	2	0	1	0	-		
	Kim Ju-won	7	1B	NC	0.000	1	0	0	0	0	0	0	0	-		
6	Park Dong-won	27	C	LG	0.750	4	1	3	1	3	0	0	0	1,314,038	206	43.62
	Kim Hyung-jun	25	C	NC	0.000	0	0	0	0	0	0	0	0	-		
7	Lee Ju-hyoung	2	LF	Kiwoom	0.500	4	0	2	0	0	0	0	0	-		
8	Park Hae-min	17	CF	LG	0.000	3	0	0	0	0	0	0	0	1,123,682	164	36.26
	Kim Ho Ryung	27	CF	Kia	0.000	1	0	0	0	0	0	0	0	-		
9	Park Chan-ho	1	SS	Kia	0.250	4	1	1	0	0	0	1	0	937,896	141	30.62

Nanum All-Stars Pitching
Player	No.	Pos.	Team	ERA	IP	NP	ER	HR	SO	BB	HB	Votes	PV	Score
Cody Ponce	30	SP	Hanwha	0.00	1.0	20	1	0	3	1	4	1,625,259	234	52.18
Park Sang-won	58	RP	Hanwha	13.50	0.2	22	1	1	1	0	4	1,340,968	74	32.90
Kim Seo-hyeon	44	CP	Hanwha	0.00	1.0	11	0	0	1	0	3	1,786,837	220	54.19

Statistics last updated on June 25, 2025.

=== Result ===
July 12, 2025 | 18:00 KST at Daejeon Hanwha Life Ballpark, Daejeon, South Korea
Team	1	2	3	4	5	6	7	8	9	R	H	E
Dream All-Stars	1	0	3	0	0	1	0	1	0	6	13	0
Nanum All-Stars	4	3	0	0	0	0	0	1	-	8	14	1
Starting pitchers: Dream: Park Se-woong (Lotte); Nanum: Cody Ponce (Hanwha); WP: Cody Ponce LP: Park Se-woong Sv: Kim Seo-hyeon; Home runs: Dream: Ahn Hyun-min (Top 8th, solo off Park Sang-won); Nanum: Park Dong-won (Bottom 2nd, 2 run Park Se-woong) & Kim Tae-gun (Bottom 8th, solo off Park Yeong-hyun); Attendance: 16,850; Umpires: Yoon Tae-soo, Kim Ik-soo, Oh Hoon-gyu, Koo Myeong-hwan, Ham Ji-woong, Cha Jeong-gu

== Postseason ==
The 2025 KBO League postseason began on October 2. The LG Twins, Hanwha Eagles, SSG Landers, Samsung Lions and NC Dinos qualified for the playoffs. The Twins won the pennant race (first place).

=== Qualification ===
In order for a team to qualify for the postseason, they must rank fifth or higher in the regular season. Fifth and fourth place are guaranteed to play in the Wild Card, third in the semi-playoff, second in the playoff, and first in the Korean Series.

In the regular season standings, there is a Postseason column; indicating the postseason status of each team.

=== Postseason bracket ===
The 2025 KBO postseason started in the fall. The top five teams in the regular season standings qualified: the Twins, Eagles, Landers, Lions, and Dinos.

Wild Card
4	Samsung Lions	1
5	NC Dinos	1

Semi-playoff
3	SSG Landers	1
4	Samsung Lions	3

Playoff
2	Hanwha Eagles	3
4	Samsung Lions	2

Korean Series
1	LG Twins	4
2	Hanwha Eagles	1

==== Wild Card ====
===== (4) Samsung Lions vs (5) NC Dinos =====
The series started with a 1–0 advantage for the Lions.

Lions won the series, 1-1.

Game	Date	Score	Location	Time	Attendance
1	October 6	NC Dinos – 4, Samsung Lions – 1	Daegu Samsung Lions Park	2:48	23,680
2	October 7	NC Dinos – 0, Samsung Lions – 3	Daegu Samsung Lions Park	2:50	23,680

==== Semi-playoff ====
Quarterfinals – best of 5 series.

===== (3) SSG Landers vs (4) Samsung Lions =====
Game 2 was rained out, so the game was played on October 11 instead of October 10. Games 3 and 4 were adjusted as well.

Lions won the series, 3-1.

Game	Date	Score	Location	Time	Attendance
1	October 9	Samsung Lions – 5, SSG Landers – 2	Incheon SSG Landers Field	3:24	22,500
2	October 11	Samsung Lions – 3, SSG Landers – 4	Incheon SSG Landers Field	2:58	22,500
3	October 13	SSG Landers – 3, Samsung Lions – 5	Daegu Samsung Lions Park	2:58	23,680
4	October 14	SSG Landers – 2, Samsung Lions – 5	Daegu Samsung Lions Park	3:03	23,680

==== Playoff ====
Semi-finals – best of 5 series.

===== (2) Hanwha Eagles vs (4) Samsung Lions =====
Game 1 was rained out, so the game was played on October 18 instead of October 17. Games 2 through 5 were adjusted as well.

Eagles won the series, 3-2.

Game	Date	Score	Location	Time	Attendance
1	October 18, 2025	Samsung Lions – 8, Hanwha Eagles – 9	Daejeon Hanwha Life Ballpark	3:35	16,750
2	October 19, 2025	Samsung Lions – 7, Hanwha Eagles – 3	Daejeon Hanwha Life Ballpark	3:16	16,750
3	October 21, 2025	Hanwha Eagles – 5, Samsung Lions – 4	Daegu Samsung Lions Park	3:04	23,680
4	October 22, 2025	Hanwha Eagles – 4, Samsung Lions – 7	Daegu Samsung Lions Park	3:16	23,680
5	October 24, 2025	Samsung Lions – 2, Hanwha Eagles – 11	Daejeon Hanwha Life Ballpark	3:14	16,750

==== 2025 Korean Series ====
Finals – best of 7 series.

===== (1) LG Twins vs (2) Hanwha Eagles =====
Twins won the series, 4-1.

Game	Date	Score	Location	Time	Attendance
1	October 26, 2025	Hanwha Eagles – 2, LG Twins – 8	Jamsil Baseball Stadium	2:55	23,750
2	October 27, 2025	Hanwha Eagles – 5, LG Twins – 13	Jamsil Baseball Stadium	3:08	23,750
3	October 29, 2025	LG Twins – 3, Hanwha Eagles – 7	Daejeon Hanwha Life Ballpark	3:14	16,750
4	October 30, 2025	LG Twins – 7, Hanwha Eagles – 4	Daejeon Hanwha Life Ballpark	3:24	16,750
5	October 31, 2025	LG Twins – 4, Hanwha Eagles – 1	Daejeon Hanwha Life Ballpark	3:05	16,750

Legend • WC: Wild Card winner • SPO: Semi-playoff winner • PO: Playoff winner

Note: All dates and times are in KST (Korea Standard Time).

== Attendance ==
The average home attendances per club as of June 2025:

#	Baseball club	Average attendance
1	Samsung Lions	22,312
2	LG Twins	22,260
3	Lotte Giants	20,301
4	Doosan Bears	19,839
5	SSG Landers	17,706
6	KIA Tigers	17,022
7	Hanhwa Eagles	16,906
8	KT Wiz	12,215
9	NC Dinos	11,289
10	Kiwoom Heroes	11,008

== See also ==
- 2025 Major League Baseball season
- 2025 Nippon Professional Baseball season
- 2025 in baseball
