= Cody Ponce =

American baseball player (born 1994)

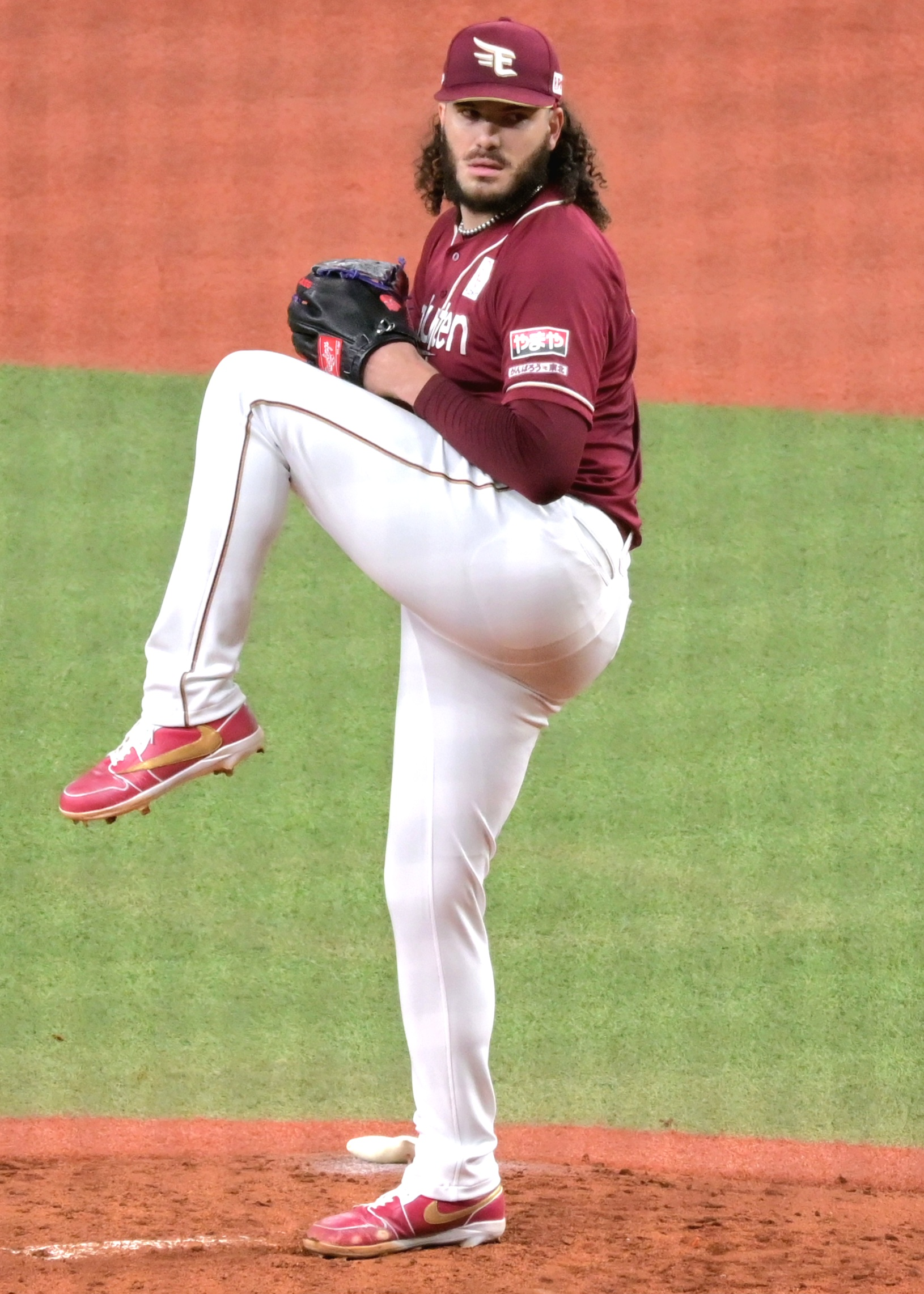
- Ponce with the Tohoku Rakuten Golden Eagles in 2024

Toronto Blue Jays – No. 66
- Pitcher
- Born: April 25, 1994 (age 32); Pomona, California, U.S.
- Bats: Right Throws: Right

Professional debut
- MLB: August 2, 2020, for the Pittsburgh Pirates
- NPB: April 20, 2022, for the Hokkaido Nippon-Ham Fighters
- KBO: March 22, 2025, for the Hanwha Eagles

MLB statistics (through 2026 season)
- Win–loss record: 1–7
- Earned run average: 5.77
- Strikeouts: 51

NPB statistics (through 2024 season)
- Win–loss record: 10–16
- Earned run average: 4.54
- Strikeouts: 165

KBO statistics (through 2025 season)
- Win–loss record: 17–1
- Earned run average: 1.89
- Strikeouts: 252
- Stats at Baseball Reference

Teams
- Pittsburgh Pirates (2020–2021); Hokkaido Nippon-Ham Fighters (2022–2023); Tohoku Rakuten Golden Eagles (2024); Hanwha Eagles (2025); Toronto Blue Jays (2026–present)

Career highlights and awards
- NPB: Pitched a no-hitter on August 27, 2022; KBO: Choi Dong-won Award (2025); KBO All-Star (2025); KBO MVP (2025)

Cody Joe Ponce (born April 25, 1994) is an American professional baseball pitcher for the Toronto Blue Jays of Major League Baseball (MLB). He has previously played in MLB for the Pittsburgh Pirates, in Nippon Professional Baseball (NPB) for the Hokkaido Nippon-Ham Fighters and Tohoku Rakuten Golden Eagles, and in KBO League for the Hanwha Eagles.

Ponce played college baseball for the Cal Poly Pomona Broncos. He was selected by the Milwaukee Brewers in the second round of the 2015 MLB draft, and later traded to the Pirates in 2019. He made his MLB debut with the Pirates in 2020 and played with the team through the 2021 season.

== Early life ==
Ponce was born on April 25, 1994, in Pomona, California. Raised in neighboring Upland, a suburb within the Greater Los Angeles area, Ponce grew up a Los Angeles Dodgers fan and particularly admired pitcher Clayton Kershaw.

== High school career ==
Ponce attended Damien High School in La Verne, graduating in 2012. He was a pitcher for the school's baseball team, the Damien Spartans, and finished his senior season with a 3–3 win–loss record, a 3.09 earned run average (ERA), and 43 strikeouts in 45 1/3 innings pitched across 16 games.

== College career ==
Ponce played college baseball for the Cal Poly Pomona Broncos from 2013 to 2015.

During the summers, Ponce played collegiate summer baseball. He played for the Mat-Su Miners of the Alaska Baseball League (ABL) in 2013 and for the Brewster Whitecaps of the Cape Cod Baseball League (CCBL) in 2014, where he was named an all-star.

== Professional career ==
=== Milwaukee Brewers ===
==== Minor leagues ====
Ponce was selected 55th overall by the Milwaukee Brewers in the second round of the 2015 MLB draft. He signed with the Brewers, receiving a $1,108,000 signing bonus, the full slot value assigned to the pick. Shortly thereafter, Ponce made his professional debut with the Rookie-level Helena Brewers. The Brewers then promoted him to the Class-A Wisconsin Timber Rattlers. Ponce finished the 2015 season with a combined 2–1 win–loss record, a 2.29 earned run average (ERA), and 40 strikeouts in 51 innings pitched across 14 games (nine starts).

Ponce began the 2016 season on the disabled list with the Advanced-A Brevard County Manatees. He made his first appearance for the Manatees in June. Ponce finished the 2016 season with a 2–8 record, a 5.25 ERA, and 69 strikeouts in 72 innings pitched across 17 starts.

Ponce split the 2017 season between the Advanced-A Carolina Mudcats and the Double-A Biloxi Shuckers. He finished the 2017 season with a combined 10–9 record, a 4.45 ERA, and 103 strikeouts in 137 2/3 innings pitched across 25 starts.

Ponce spent the 2018 season with the Shuckers, finishing with a 7–6 record, a 4.36 ERA, and 88 strikeouts in 95 innings pitched across 29 games (11 starts).

=== Pittsburgh Pirates ===
Ponce began the 2019 season with the Shuckers before being traded to the Pittsburgh Pirates in exchange for Jordan Lyles midway through the season on July 29. He split the 2019 season between the Shuckers, the Double-A Altoona Curve, and the Triple-A Indianapolis Indians, finishing with a combined 2–6 record, a 4.14 ERA, and 70 strikeouts in 63 innings pitched across 34 games (five starts). During the off-season, he played for the Peoria Javelinas in the Arizona Fall League (AFL), finishing with a 2–1 record, a 2.35 ERA, and 27 strikeouts in 23 innings pitched across five starts. After the 2019 season, the Pirates added Ponce to their 40-man roster.

==== Major leagues ====
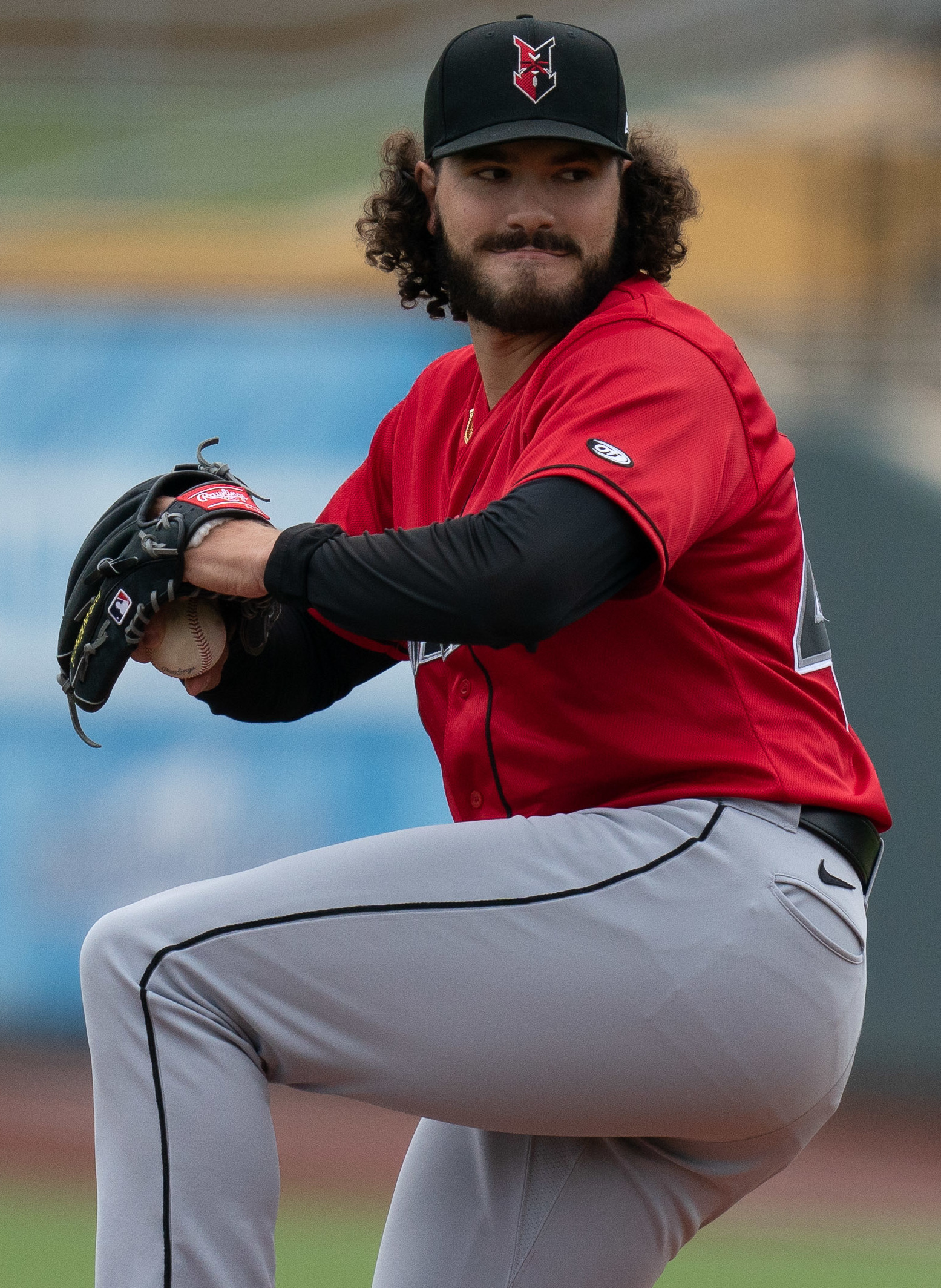
Ponce with the Indianapolis Indians in 2021

Ponce made his Major League Baseball (MLB) debut on August 2, 2020, playing for the Pittsburgh Pirates in an away game against the Chicago Cubs at Wrigley Field in Chicago, Illinois. He entered the game as a reliever in the bottom of the 11th inning with the score tied 1–1. The game resulted in a 2–1 loss to the Cubs after Javier Báez hit a walk-off single off Ponce. He was recorded as the losing pitcher after 1/3 innings pitched, allowing one hit and one unearned run. Ponce finished the 2020 season with a 1–1 record, a 3.18 ERA, and 12 strikeouts in 17 innings pitched across five games (three starts).

Ponce finished the 2021 season with a 0–6 record, a 7.04 ERA, and 36 strikeouts in 38 1/3 innings pitched across 15 games (two starts). Throughout the season, he was frequently optioned to the Indianapolis Indians, the Pirates' Triple-A affiliate, shuttling between the Indians and the Pirates' bullpen. After the 2021 season, the Pirates released Ponce on November 29, to allow him to play in Japan.

=== Hokkaido Nippon-Ham Fighters ===
On December 5, 2021, Ponce signed with the Hokkaido Nippon-Ham Fighters of Nippon Professional Baseball (NPB).

On August 27, 2022, Ponce pitched a no-hitter against the Fukuoka SoftBank Hawks in Sapporo Dome. He became the seventh foreign-born player to achieve the feat since the NPB introduced the two-league system when it was reorganized from the Japanese Baseball League (JBL) in the 1950 season. Ponce finished the 2022 season with a 3–5 record, a 3.35 ERA, and 66 strikeouts in 83 1/3 innings pitched across 14 games.

On April 5, 2023, Ponce was diagnosed with a partially torn quadriceps tendon in his left leg, which sidelined him for four weeks. He finished the 2023 season with a 4–5 record, a 3.66 ERA, and 43 strikeouts in 51 2/3 innings pitched across 10 games. On November 27, it was announced that Ponce and the Fighters could not reach a contract agreement, making him a free agent.

=== Tohoku Rakuten Golden Eagles ===
On December 26, 2023, Ponce signed with the Tohoku Rakuten Golden Eagles of Nippon Professional Baseball (NPB). He finished the 2024 season with a 3–6 record, a 6.72 ERA, and 56 strikeouts in 67 innings pitched across 15 games. On December 2, 2024, the Eagles announced that Ponce would not be brought back in 2025, making him a free agent.

=== Hanwha Eagles ===
On December 12, 2024, Ponce signed with the Hanwha Eagles of the KBO League.

Ponce was named the KBO League's MVP of the Month for March–April 2025. On May 17, 2025, Ponce set a new KBO record with 18 strikeouts in a regulation nine-inning game, the first matchup of a doubleheader against SSG Landers in Daejeon. He surpassed Hyun-jin Ryu's previous mark of 17 strikeouts in a nine-inning game, set on May 11, 2010. On September 3, Ponce recorded a season total of 228 strikeouts, surpassing Ariel Miranda's 225 to set a new KBO League single-season strikeout record. Ponce finished the 2025 season with a 17–1 record, a 1.89 ERA, and 252 strikeouts in 180 2/3 innings pitched across 29 starts. The Eagles finished the 2025 season in second place behind the LG Twins.

Facing the Samsung Lions in the playoff round, Ponce started Game 1 on October 18, striking out eight batters and handing the lead to the bullpen en route to a victory in the team's first playoff game since 2018. In the winner-take-all fifth game on October 24, Ponce neutralized the Lions across five innings, striking out nine and allowing one unearned run, despite being hit on the chest with a sharp line drive off the bat of Lewin Díaz in the third inning. Entering in relief, stablemate Ryan Weiss completed the final four innings to send the Eagles to the Korean Series as Ponce became the winning pitcher in the decisive game. On October 29, with the Twins up 2–0 in the series, Ponce started Game 3 of the Korean Series in Daejeon. He delivered a six-inning quality start, and the Eagles defeated the Twins' bullpen to earn their first win in a Korean Series game since 2006. Despite strong performances in Daejeon by Ponce and Weiss, the Eagles ultimately lost the series 4–1. Due to his performance during the regular season, Ponce was unanimously awarded the Choi Dong-won Award and was named the league MVP.

=== Toronto Blue Jays ===
On December 10, 2025, Ponce signed a three-year, $30 million contract with the Toronto Blue Jays. At the time of signing, it was the largest contract for a pitcher returning to Major League Baseball (MLB) from the KBO League, surpassing the two-year, $15-million deal signed by Erick Fedde with the Chicago White Sox on December 13, 2023. On March 30, 2026, during his first start of the 2026 season, Ponce sustained a leg injury and was carted off the field. The following day, the team placed Ponce on the 15-day injured list and announced that he had suffered an ACL sprain and would miss "significant time". He was transferred to the 60-day injured list on April 5. Ponce underwent knee surgery on April 7, and was given a recovery timetable of six months.

== International career ==
Ponce was selected to play for the United States national baseball team at the 2019 WBSC Premier12. He was the team's ace pitcher and started the bronze medal game against Mexico, which the United States lost 3–2 to finish in fourth place. Ponce finished the tournament with a 1–1 record, a 2.03 ERA, and 11 strikeouts in 13 1/3 innings pitched across three starts.

== Personal life ==
Ponce is of Mexican descent.

Ponce has two sisters named Devan and Jess.

Ponce is married to Emma Kittle, the older sister of NFL player George Kittle, making the two brothers-in-law.
