= Im Chan-kyu =

South Korean baseball player (born 1992)

LG Twins – No. 1
- Pitcher
- Born: November 20, 1992 (age 33); Seoul, South Korea
- Bats: Right Throws: Right

KBO debut
- April 2, 2011, for the LG Twins

KBO statistics (through 2026)
- Win–loss record: 15–7
- Earned run average: 4.46
- Strikeouts: 102
- Stats at Baseball Reference

Teams
- LG Twins (2011–present)
Medals
Men's baseball
Representing South Korea
Asian Games
Gold medal – first place	2018 Jakarta-Palembang	Team

Im Chan-kyu (Korean: 임찬규; born November 20, 1992) is a South Korean professional baseball pitcher for the LG Twins of the KBO League. He appeared in baseball contests during the 2018 Asian Games, and won a gold medal for South Korea.

== Filmography ==
=== TV shows ===
Year	Title	Role	Notes	Ref.
2023	Our Game: LG Twins	Himself	TVING release, documentary	
2026	Baseball Eccentric Im Chan-kyu	Himself	TVING release, 8 episodes	
