= Chae Eun-seong =

South Korean baseball player (born 1990)

Hanwha Eagles – No. 22
- First baseman / Right fielder
- Born: February 6, 1990 (age 36); Suncheon, South Jeolla Province, South Korea
- Bats: Right Throws: Right

KBO debut
- May 27, 2014, for the LG Twins

KBO statistics (through 2025)
- Batting average: .290
- Home runs: 158
- Runs batted in: 850
- Stats at Baseball Reference

Teams
- LG Twins (2009–2022); Hanwha Eagles (2023–present)

Chae Eun-seong (Korean: 채은성; born February 6, 1990) is a South Korean professional baseball player for the Hanwha Eagles of the KBO League. He previously played for the LG Twins. He became the captain of the Eagles starting in 2024.
