= Daejeon Hanwha Life Ballpark =

Baseball stadium in Daejeon, South Korea

- 대전한화생명볼파크
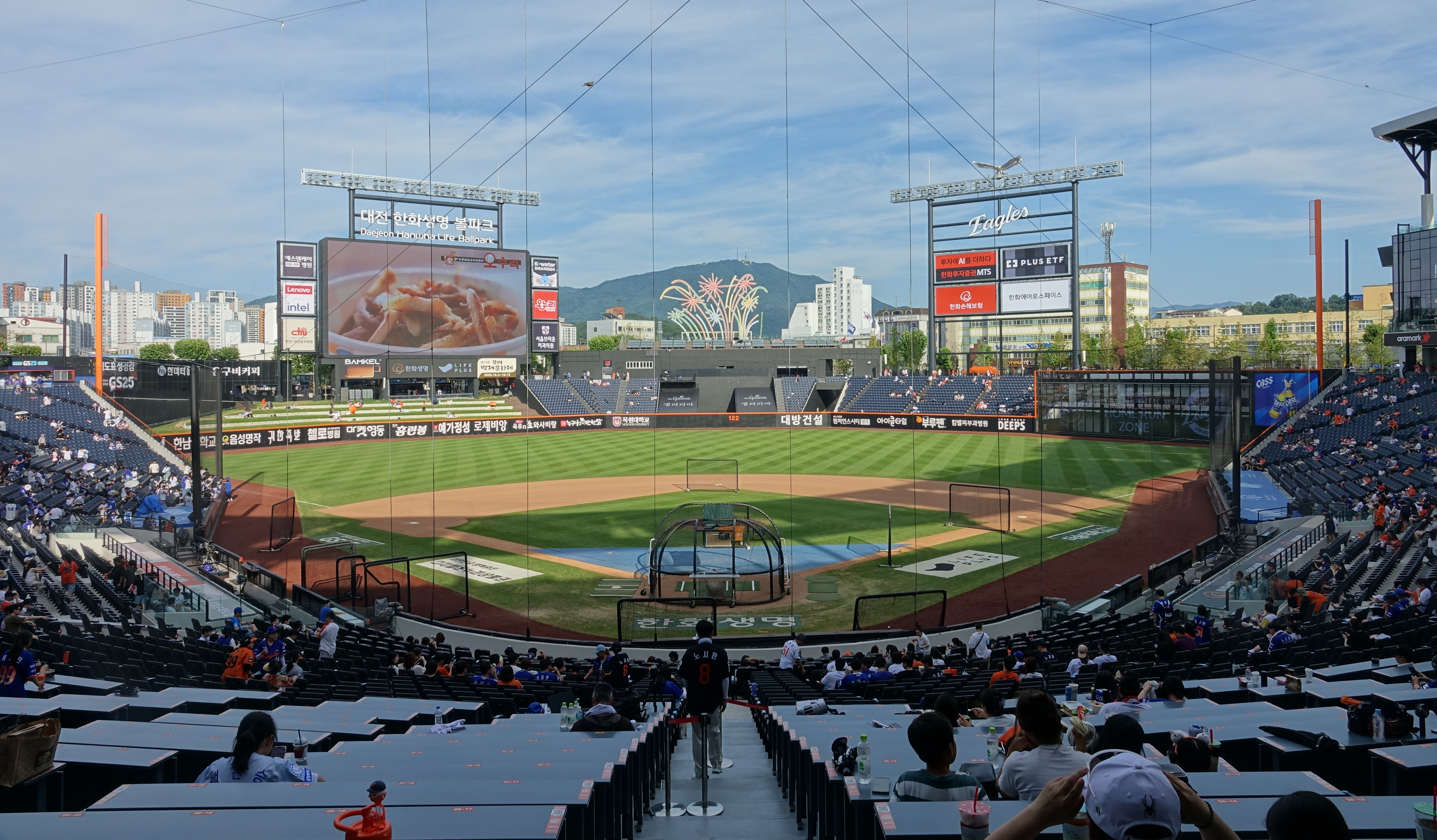
- The ballpark in 2025, during its inaugural season
- Interactive map of Daejeon Hanwha Life Ballpark
- Location: 373 Daejong-ro, Busa-dong; Jung-gu, Daejeon, South Korea
- Coordinates: 36°18′58.5″N 127°25′53.2″E
- Owner: Daejeon Metropolitan City
- Capacity: around 20,000
- Surface: Grass
- Field size: Left Field Line – 99 m (325 ft); Left-Center – 115 m (377 ft); Center Field – 122 m (400 ft); Right-Center – 112 m (367 ft); Right Field Line – 95 m (312 ft); Left/Center OF Wall Height – 2.4 m (7.9 ft); Right OF Wall Height – 8 m (26.2 ft)

Construction
- Built: March 22, 2022 - February 28, 2025
- Opened: March 5, 2025
- Cost: 207.4 billion won

Tenant
- Hanwha Eagles (2025–present)

Daejeon Hanwha Life Ballpark (Korean: 대전 한화생명 볼파크) is a ballpark located in Daejeon, South Korea. It is the home of the Hanwha Eagles of the KBO League and was constructed to replace Hanbat Baseball Stadium.

Construction started in March 2022 and was completed in February 2025, with its opening being on March 5, 2025.

== Features ==
The stadium has a capacity of approximately 20,000 spectators, with around 17,000 seated areas and additional specialty spaces such as grass seating and the infinity pool deck. The field features an asymmetrical outfield with a left-field line measuring 99 meters and a right-field line at 95 meters.

The right-field features the "Monster Wall" an 8-meter translucent glass wall showing the bullpens of both teams, The "Monster Wall", named after Fenway Park's Green Monster, is Asia's first double-decker bullpen. the rest of the outfield fences are 2.4 meters high.

Other features include sports exhibits, indoor practice facilities, children's playgrounds, and upgraded training facilities.

== Background ==
The opening ceremony for Daejeon Hanwha Life Ballpark was held on March 5, 2025, featuring classical performances, DJ sets, laser shows, and fan events, including meet and greet with team members to celebrate the stadium's launch. The first games played at the stadium were exhibition matches against the Samsung Lions on March 17 and 18, 2025, followed by the regular-season home opener against the Kia Tigers on March 28, 2025, which was sold out. The stadium also hosted the 2025 KBO All-Star Game on July 12, 2025.

In the Eagles' first season, the stadium had a total attendance of 1,231,840 spectators and sold out 62 of 73 regular season games, an all-KBO sellout record. in 2025, it also hosted postseason games and the Korean Series for the first time where the Eagles lost the series four games to one versus the LG Twins.
