= Shinil High School =

High school in Seoul, South Korea

Location
- Gangbuk, Seoul; South Korea; 37°37′42″N 127°01′40″E

Information
- Type: Private
- Motto: A free man working in faith믿음으로 일하는 자유인
- Established: 1966
- Faculty: 66
- Enrollment: 1081
- Campus: Urban, 12,000 m^{2} (130,000 sq ft)
- Website: www.shin-il.hs.kr

- Shinil High School
- Hangul: 신일고등학교
- Hanja: 信一高等學校
- RR: Sinil godeunghakgyo
- MR: Sinil kodŭnghakkyo

Shinil High School (Korean: 신일고등학교) is a secondary school in Seoul, South Korea. It was founded in 1966, and has been designated as an autonomous private school by the Ministry of Education since 2009.
