= Posting system (KBO) =

Baseball players transfer scheme

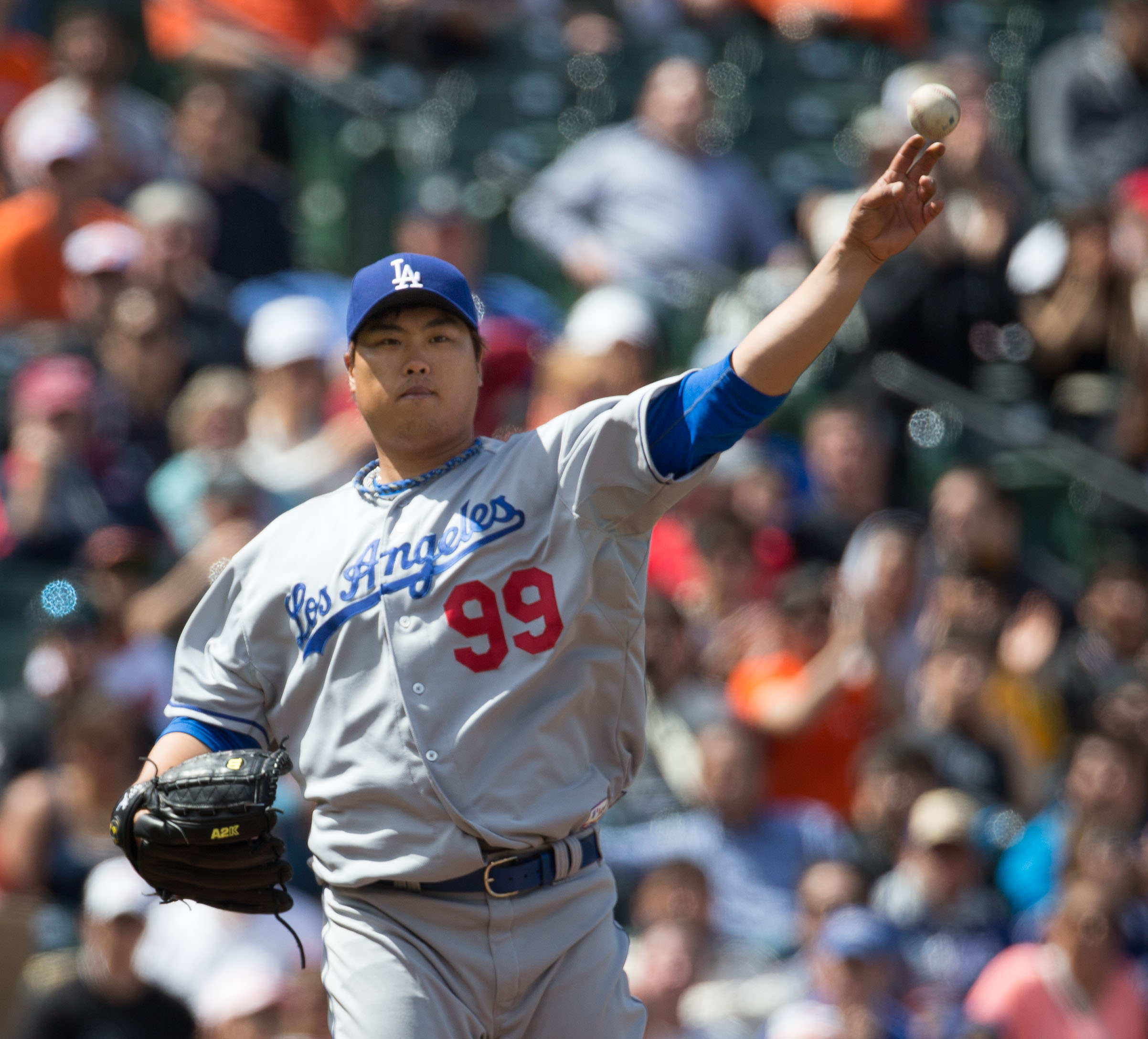
Hyun-jin Ryu was the first KBO player to enter MLB via the posting system.

The posting system is a baseball player transfer system that operates between Korea Baseball Organization (KBO) and the Major League Baseball (MLB). The system is based on the original posting system that was put in place between MLB and Nippon Professional Baseball (NPB) in 1998.

To be eligible for posting, a player must have first played at least seven years in the KBO. Under this system, when a KBO player is "posted," MLB holds a four-day-long silent auction during which MLB teams can submit sealed bids in an attempt to win the exclusive rights to negotiate with the player for a period of 30 days. If the KBO team accepts the winning bid, then the player is free to negotiate with the highest-bidding MLB team. If the MLB team and the KBO player agree on contract terms before the 30-day period has expired, the KBO team receives the bid amount as a transfer fee, and the player is free to play in MLB. If the KBO team rejects the winning bid or if the MLB team cannot come to a contract agreement with the posted player, then no fee is paid, and the player's rights revert to his KBO team.

Up to the end of the 2014–15 posting period, eight KBO players had been posted using the system. Of these, two signed Major League contracts immediately, one signed a minor league contract, four bids were rejected by KBO teams, and one could not come to a contract agreement during the 30-day negotiation period. The eight players that have been acquired by MLB teams through the posting system are Choi Hyang-nam, Hyun-jin Ryu, Jung-ho Kang, Byung-ho Park, Kwang-hyun Kim, Ha-seong Kim, Jung-hoo Lee, Woo-suk Go, and Hyeseong Kim.

== Postings ==
=== Past postings ===
Of the South Korean-born players who have played in MLB, seven have entered the league using the posting system.

Successful postings
Player	Posting date	KBO team	MLB team	Winning bid or posting fee	Date of contract agreement	MLB contract	Notes
Choi Hyang-nam^{P}	January 22, 2009	Lotte Giants	St. Louis Cardinals	$101		Minor league contract	
Ryu Hyun-jin^{P}	November 1, 2012	Hanwha Eagles	Los Angeles Dodgers	$25,737,737.33	December 9, 2012	6 year, $36 million	
Kang Jung-ho	December 15, 2014	Nexen Heroes	Pittsburgh Pirates	$5,002,015	January 16, 2015	4 year, $11 million	
Park Byung-ho	November 2, 2015	Nexen Heroes	Minnesota Twins	$12,850,000	December 1, 2015	4 year, $12 million	
Kim Kwang-hyun^{P}	December 6, 2019	SK Wyverns	St. Louis Cardinals	$1,600,000	December 17, 2019	2 year, $8 million	
Kim Ha-seong	November 25, 2020	Kiwoom Heroes	San Diego Padres	$5,525,000	December 31, 2020	4 year, $28 million	
Lee Jung-hoo	December 4, 2023	Kiwoom Heroes	San Francisco Giants	$18,825,000	December 13, 2023	6 year, $113 million	
Go Woo-suk^{P}	December 4, 2023	LG Twins	San Diego Padres	$900,000	January 3, 2024	2 year, $4.5 million	
Hyeseong Kim	December 4, 2024	Kiwoom Heroes	Los Angeles Dodgers	$2,000,000	January 3, 2025	3 year, $12.5 million	
Sung-mun Song	November 22, 2025	Kiwoom Heroes	San Diego Padres	$3,000,000	December 22, 2025	4 year, $15 million	

^PThis player is a pitcher.

Unsuccessful postings
Player	Posting date	KBO team	Result	Notes
Lee Sang-hoon^{P}	1998	LG Twins	The LG Twins rejected the winning MLB team's highest bid of $600,000.	
Jin Pil-jung^{P}	December 2002	Doosan Bears	The Doosan Bears rejected the winning MLB team's highest bid of $25,000.	
Lim Chang-yong^{P}	December 2002	Samsung Lions	The Samsung Lions rejected the winning MLB team's highest bid of $650,000.	
Kim Kwang-hyun^{P}	November 4, 2014	SK Wyverns	The San Diego Padres were awarded exclusive negotiating rights on November 11, 2014, after bidding $2 million. Contract negotiations ended without an agreement and Kim returned to the Wyverns.	
Yang Hyeon-jong^{P}	November 17, 2014	Kia Tigers	The Kia Tigers rejected the winning MLB team's highest bid. It was reported that the Minnesota Twins or the Texas Rangers were possibly the highest bidders with a bid estimated at $1.5 million, though the exact details were never disclosed.	
Son Ah-seop	November 16, 2015	Lotte Giants		
Hwang Jae-gyun	November 30, 2015	Lotte Giants	The Lotte Giants did not receive any bids.	
Kim Jae-hwan	December 5, 2019	Doosan Bears		
Na Sung-bum	December 10, 2020	LG Twins		

^PThis player is a pitcher.

== See also ==
- Baseball in Korea
- Transfer in association football
