= Greg McCarthy =

American baseball player (born 1968)

- Pitcher
- Born: October 30, 1968 (age 57); Norwalk, Connecticut, U.S.
- Batted: Left Threw: Left

MLB debut
- August 28, 1996, for the Seattle Mariners

Last MLB appearance
- September 23, 1998, for the Seattle Mariners

MLB statistics
- Win–loss record: 2-3
- Earned run average: 4.74
- Strikeouts: 66
- Stats at Baseball Reference

Teams
- Seattle Mariners (1996–1998)

Gregory O'Neil McCarthy (born October 30, 1968) is an American former professional baseball relief pitcher. He played for the Seattle Mariners of Major League Baseball (MLB) from 1996 to 1998.

== Career ==
His journey began when he was selected by the Philadelphia Phillies in the 36th round of the 1987 amateur draft out of Bridgeport Central High School. McCarthy spent the early years of his career grinding through the Phillies minor league system, showing early promise with a sub-1.00 ERA during his first professional season with the Utica Blue Sox.

The path to the Major Leagues was far from near for McCarthy, as he faced hurdles including team changes and a physical setback. After several years in the Phillies' organization, he was selected by the Montreal Expos in the Rule 5 draft. However, his progress was stalled by a shoulder injury that required surgery, preventing him from sticking with the big league club at that time. He eventually moved through the Cleveland Indians and Chicago White Sox organizations, pitching for teams like the Kinston Indians and Birmingham Barons while attempting to recapture the form that had made him a prospect.

McCarthy finally achieved his Major League dream in 1996 after signing with the Seattle Mariners. After nearly a decade in the minor leagues, he made his MLB debut on August 28, 1996, in a game against the New York Yankees. He became a reliable left-handed option out of the bullpen for the Mariners during a high-powered era for the franchise. His most active season came in 1997, when he appeared in 37 games and posted a career-high 34 strikeouts over nearly 30 innings of work. Over the course of three seasons in Seattle, he made 76 total appearances, finishing his Major League tenure with a 4.74 ERA and 66 strikeouts.

Following his final Major League appearance in 1998, McCarthy’s career entered a transition phase marked by further injury struggles and a stint in the independent leagues. He spent time in the organizations of the New York Yankees, Milwaukee Brewers, and Florida Marlins, but a second shoulder surgery and a drop in velocity eventually ended his time in baseball. Rather than retiring, he brought his experience to the independent circuit, playing for teams such as the Atlantic City Surf and the New Haven County Cutters through 2004.

In the final chapter of his career, McCarthy focused on international play and coaching, helping to grow the game across Europe. He played and coached in the Netherlands before moving to the Austrian Baseball Bundesliga in 2009 to serve as the head coach of the Attnang-Puchheim Mosquitoes. He later continued this dual role in the Czech Extraliga with AVG Draci Brno.

== Early life ==
McCarthy graduated from Central High School in Bridgeport, Connecticut
