= Rob Refsnyder =

American baseball player (born 1991)

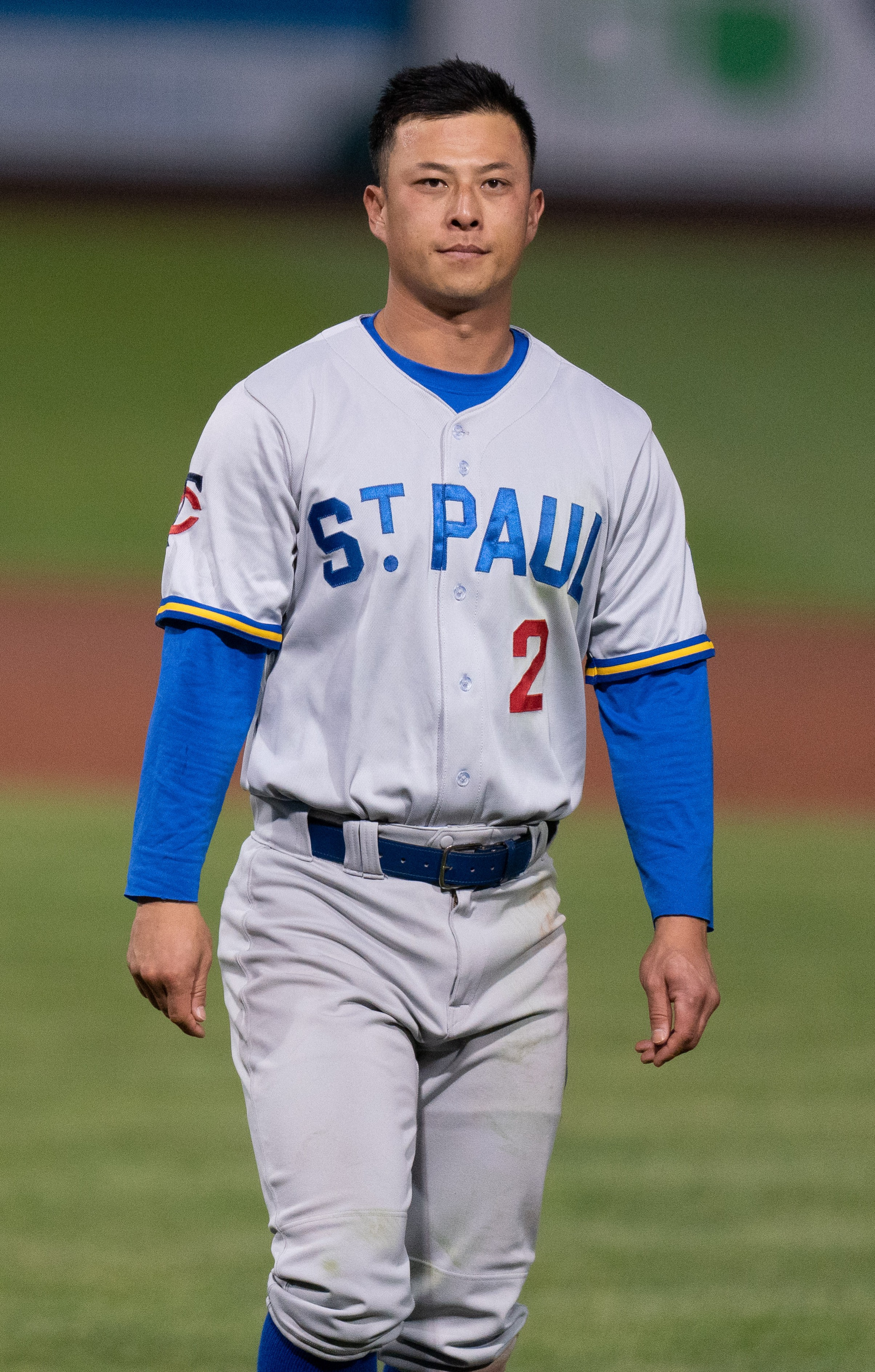
- Refsnyder with the St. Paul Saints in 2021

Free agent
- Outfielder
- Born: Kim Jung-tae 김정태; March 26, 1991 (age 35); Seoul, South Korea
- Bats: Right Throws: Right

MLB debut
- July 11, 2015, for the New York Yankees

MLB statistics (through 2026 season)
- Batting average: .246
- Home runs: 37
- Runs batted in: 165
- Stats at Baseball Reference

Teams
- New York Yankees (2015–2017); Toronto Blue Jays (2017); Tampa Bay Rays (2018); Texas Rangers (2020); Minnesota Twins (2021); Boston Red Sox (2022–2025); Seattle Mariners (2026)

Robert Daniel Refsnyder (born Kim Jung-tae; Korean: 김정태, March 26, 1991) is an American professional baseball outfielder who is a free agent. He has previously played in Major League Baseball (MLB) for the New York Yankees, Toronto Blue Jays, Tampa Bay Rays, Texas Rangers, Minnesota Twins, Boston Red Sox, and Seattle Mariners.

Refsnyder was born in Seoul, South Korea, and was adopted by a couple from Southern California when he was five months old. He became a three-sport star at Laguna Hills High School and enrolled at the University of Arizona, where he played college baseball for the Arizona Wildcats as their right fielder. Winning the 2012 College World Series with the Wildcats, Refsnyder was named the tournament's Most Outstanding Player.

The Yankees selected Refsnyder in the fifth round of the 2012 MLB draft. He began playing second base and became one of the Yankees' top prospects. He made his MLB debut with the Yankees in 2015. New York traded him to Toronto in July 2017, and he played for three other teams over the next four seasons, not playing in the majors in 2019. He signed with the Red Sox ahead of the 2022 season, spending four seasons with the club and becoming a specialist at facing left-handed pitchers. He signed with the Mariners before the 2026 season but was released in early August. In MLB, Refsnyder has played all three outfield positions and every infield position except shortstop.

== Early life ==
Refsnyder was born Kim Jung-tae in Seoul, South Korea. When he was five months old, he was adopted by an American couple from Laguna Hills, California, through Holt International Children's Services. Three years before he was adopted, the Refsnyders adopted a girl from South Korea.

== Amateur career ==
Refsnyder attended Laguna Hills High School in Laguna Hills, California, and he played baseball, basketball, and football. He was a wide receiver and outside linebacker for the football team his junior year and the quarterback his senior year. In his senior season, he was named his division's Offensive Player of the Year for the football team and co-most valuable player of the Pacific Coast League for the baseball team. NCAA Division I college football programs recruited Refsnyder as a quarterback.

Refsnyder played college baseball for the Arizona Wildcats. In his freshman year, in 2010, he batted .344 with two home runs in 57 games. He was an All-Pacific-10 Conference (Pac-10) honorable mention. As a sophomore, Refsnyder played in all 60 Wildcats games and batted .320 with six home runs. He was a first-team All-Pac-10 selection. That summer, Refsnyder played collegiate summer baseball for the Wareham Gatemen of the Cape Cod Baseball League.

As a junior during the 2012 Wildcats season, Refsnyder batted .364, leading the Wildcats with eight home runs, and had 66 runs batted in (RBIs) and 14 stolen bases. In the first game of the College World Series (CWS), Refsnyder hit a home run. He batted 10-for-21 (.476) in the CWS as the Wildcats defeated the South Carolina Gamecocks. He was named the CWS Most Outstanding Player.

During the CWS, Refsnyder said he regularly heard racist taunts from South Carolina fans, later posting on Twitter response that he would never live in South Carolina "because they can't accept Asians playing baseball". He lated deleted that post.

== Professional career ==
=== New York Yankees (2012–2017) ===
The New York Yankees selected Refsnyder in the fifth round, with the 187th overall selection in the 2012 MLB draft. He signed with the Yankees on July 6, receiving a $205,900 signing bonus. He reported to the Charleston RiverDogs of the Single-A South Atlantic League, where he made his professional debut on July 10. He batted .241 for Charleston in 2012.

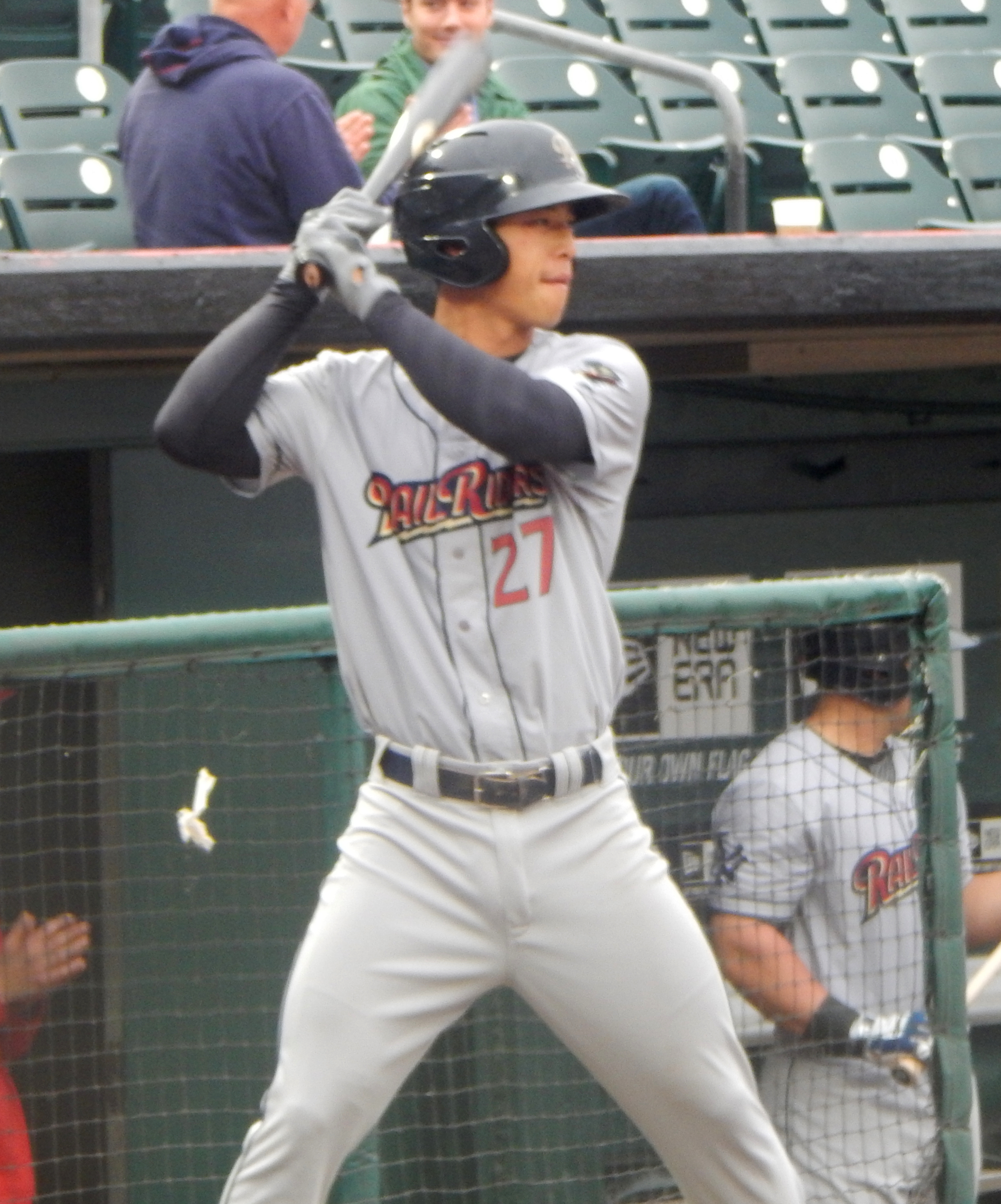
Refsnyder with the Scranton/Wilkes-Barre RailRiders in 2015

The Yankees assigned Refsnyder to Charleston to start the 2013 season. After posting a .370 batting average and a .452 on-base percentage (OBP) in 13 games, he was promoted to the Tampa Yankees of the High-A Florida State League on April 19. He batted .283 with a .408 OBP and a .404 slugging percentage in 117 games for Tampa, hitting six home runs and recording 51 RBIs.

Refsnyder began the 2014 season with the Trenton Thunder of the Double-A Eastern League. With the help of Marcus Thames, the Thunder's hitting coach, Refsnyder changed his swing to increase his power output. He won the Eastern League Player of the Week Award for the week ending June 1. After batting .342 with six home runs in 60 games for Trenton, Refsnyder was promoted to the Scranton/Wilkes-Barre RailRiders of the Triple-A International League on June 10. He finished the season with a .300 average, eight home runs, and 33 RBI in 77 games in Triple-A. Playing second base, he was one of the Yankees' top prospects.

The Yankees gave Refsnyder an opportunity to compete for a spot with the major league team in 2015 but assigned him to Triple-A to start the season so that he could continue to work on his defense. The Yankees promoted Refsnyder to the majors on July 11. With his callup, he became the fourth position player in MLB history to be born in South Korea, following Hee-seop Choi, Shin-Soo Choo, and Jung-ho Kang. Refsnyder made his major league debut that day and recorded his first two major league hits, including a two-run home run, on July 12. After four games, the Yankees optioned him to Scranton/Wilkes-Barre. The Yankees promoted Refsnyder to the majors once again on September 1, as part of their September call-ups. Refsnyder finished the regular season with a .302 average and two home runs in the major league, where he played second base. He started for the Yankees in the American League (AL) Wild Card Game, which they lost.

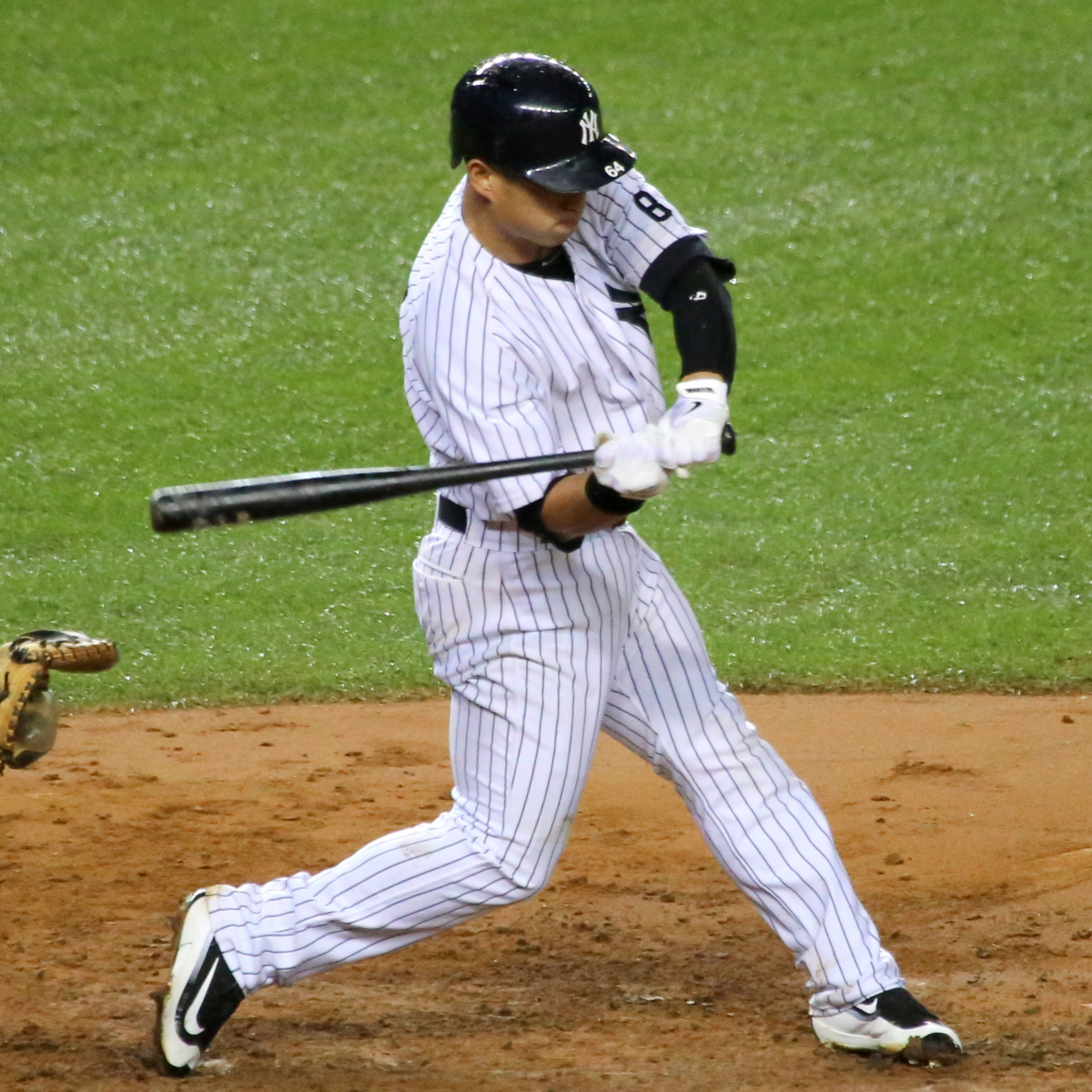
Refsnyder with the Yankees in 2015

In 2016, Refsnyder competed with Ronald Torreyes for a utility infielder role with the Yankees. The Yankees chose Torreyes and optioned Refsnyder to Triple-A on March 27. The Yankees promoted him to the major leagues on May 17. Following injuries to first baseman Mark Teixeira and Dustin Ackley, the Yankees began to play Refsnyder at first base. He batted .262 in 122 at bats before he was optioned back to the RailRiders on August 11. He was again promoted to the major leagues as a September call-up. Refsnynder finished the 2016 season with a .250 average in 58 major league games.

Refsnyder competed for a role on the Yankees' Opening Day roster in 2017, losing out to Pete Kozma. Refsnyder was optioned to Scranton/Wilkes-Barre to start the season. He returned to the majors in May, serving mostly as a bench player. When the Yankees acquired David Robertson, Todd Frazier, and Tommy Kahnle on July 19, Refsnyder was designated for assignment to make room on their 40-man roster. Through July 19, Refsnyder had a .135 batting average in 37 at bats for the Yankees.

=== Toronto Blue Jays (2017) ===
On July 23, 2017, the Yankees traded Refsnyder to the Toronto Blue Jays for Ryan McBroom. The Blue Jays assigned Refsnyder to the Triple-A Buffalo Bisons. The Blue Jays promoted him to the major leagues on July 29 to provide infield depth. Refsnyder received playing time with Toronto as a second baseman, batting .196 in 32 games in the majors in 2017.

=== Tampa Bay Rays (2018) ===
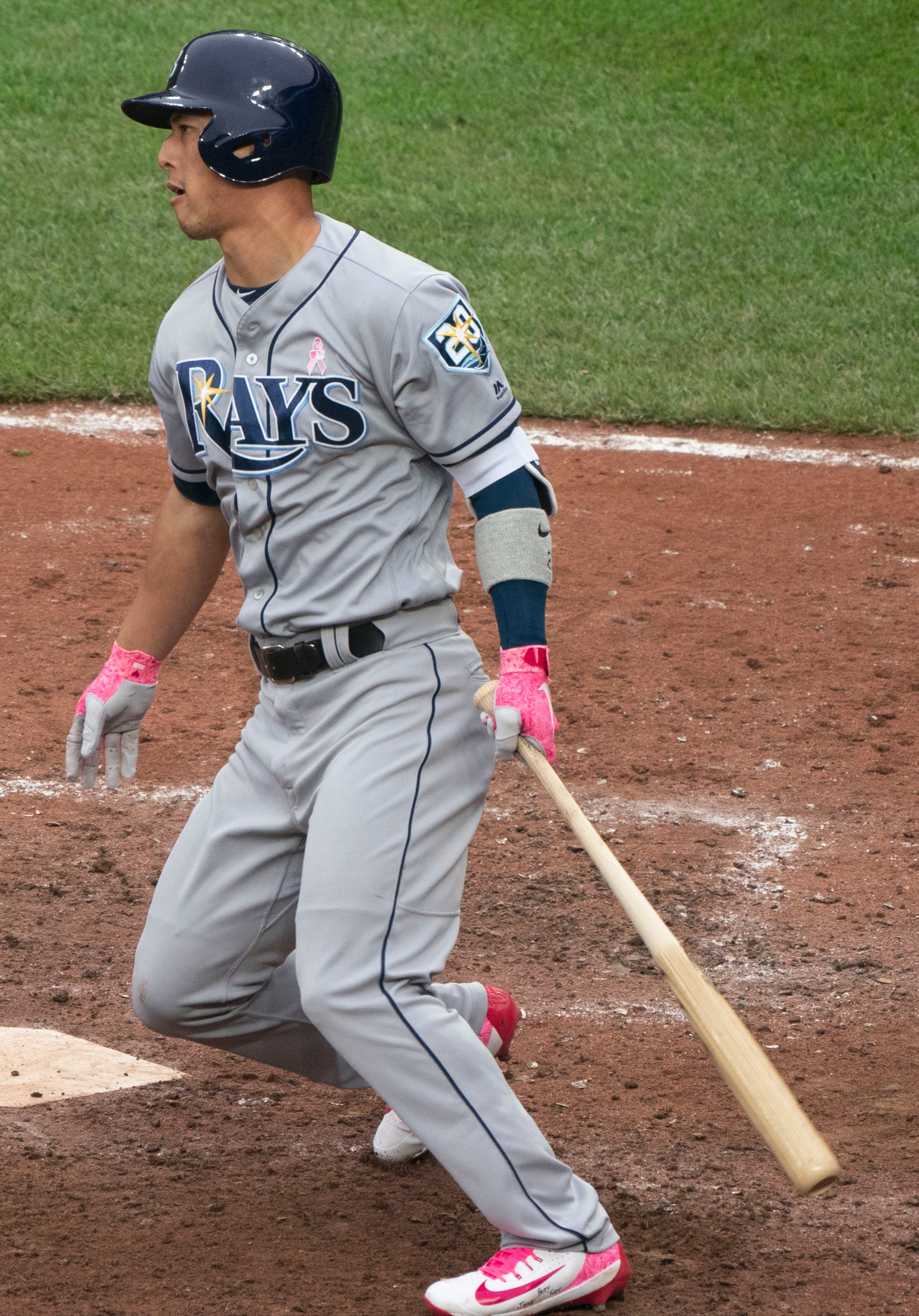
Refsnyder with the Tampa Bay Rays in 2018

After the Cleveland Indians claimed Refsnyder off of waivers on November 20, 2017, the Tampa Bay Rays acquired him from Cleveland for cash on March 27, 2018.

Refsnyder made the Rays Opening Day lineup, hitting ninth in the batting order as the designated hitter (DH). Primarily playing against left-handed pitchers, he batted .167 in 40 games before the Rays designated him for assignment on June 19.

=== Return to the minors (2018–2019) ===
Refsnyder cleared waivers and was sent outright to the Durham Bulls of the International League. he batted .283 in 51 games for Durham in 2018. Durham won the International League championship, and he was named the postseason's most valuable player, as he batted .367 with two home runs and six RBI in the postseason. Refsnyder elected free agency following the season.

Refsnyder signed a minor-league contract with the Arizona Diamondbacks on November 20, 2018. The Diamondbacks assigned him to the Reno Aces of the Triple-A Pacific Coast League to start the 2019 season. He played once for Reno, going 0-for-4 with a strikeout.

On April 7, the Diamondbacks traded Refsnyder to the Cincinnati Reds for a player to be named later or cash considerations. The Reds assigned him to the Louisville Bats of the International League. He batted .315 with 10 home runs and 45 RBI in 85 games in Triple-A. The Reds released him on August 26.

=== Texas Rangers (2020) ===
Refsnyder signed a minor league contract with the Texas Rangers on December 5, 2019. He made the Rangers' Opening Day roster in 2020, which had been delayed due to the COVID-19 pandemic. After hitting .200/.265/.233 without a home run in 34 plate appearances for the Rangers, he was designated for assignment on August 24. He elected to become a free agent.

=== Minnesota Twins (2021) ===
The Minnesota Twins signed Refsnyder to a minor league contract with a non-roster invitation to spring training on December 17, 2020. He began the 2021 season with the Triple-A St. Paul Saints. On May 15, the Twins added Refsnyder to the active roster. Despite having never played center field in the majors, Refsnyder served as the backup center fielder to Max Kepler.

After Kepler went on the injured list, on May 30, Twins manager Rocco Baldelli said that he had no choice but to "ride Refsnyder" in center field. Refsnyder suffered a concussion after he ran into the wall at Camden Yards while chasing a home run on June 2, then a strained left hamstring while running out a double on June 8. He finished the season with a .245 batting average, two home runs, 12 RBIs, and one stolen base in 51 major league games. On November 5, the Twins outrighted him off of the 40-man roster, and he elected for free agency.

=== Boston Red Sox (2022–2025) ===
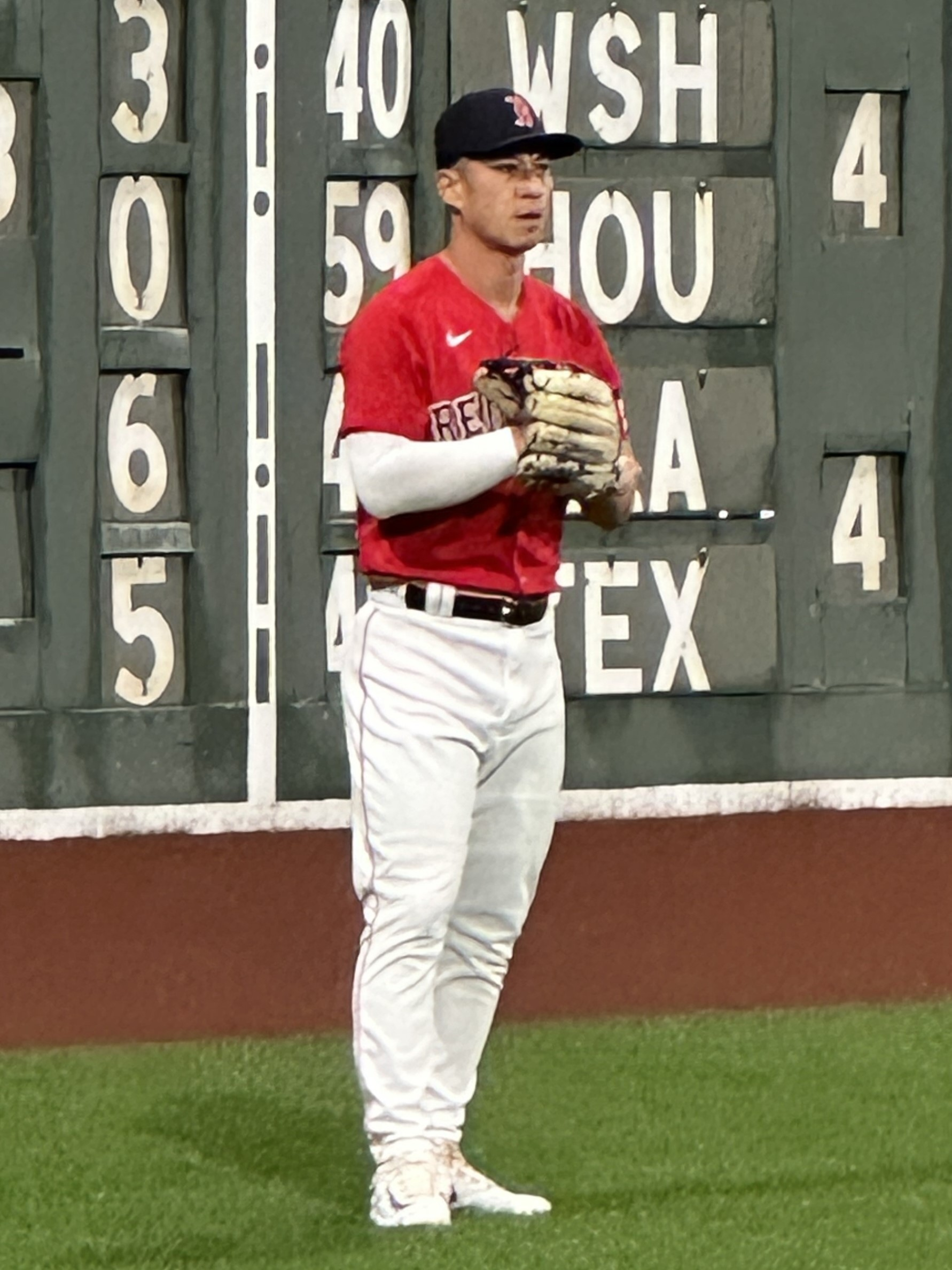
Refsnyder with the Red Sox in 2023

Refsnyder signed a minor league contract with the Boston Red Sox on November 30, 2021. After starting the season batting 14-for-35 (.400) for the Worcester Red Sox of the International League, he was added to Boston's active roster on April 19. Refsnyder made his debut with Boston on April 23 as the team's DH. He returned to Worcester on April 29. On June 10, the Red Sox promoted Refsnyder once again. He served as a fourth outfielder until being placed on the injured list with a right knee sprain on August 2. He rejoined the team on August 16. The Red Sox placed Refsnyder on the injured list due to back spasms on October 3, ending his season with a .307 average, .384 OBP, and six home runs in 177 plate appearances across 57 major league games.

Refsnyder and the Red Sox agreed to a $1.2 million salary for the 2023 season, avoiding salary arbitration. On June 3, he signed a one-year, $1.85 million contract extension with the Red Sox that included a club option for the 2025 season. During the 2023 season, he batted .248 with one home run and 28 RBIs in 89 games.

During spring training in 2024, Refsnyder fractured a toe on his left foot, delaying his availability for the regular season. For the season, he appeared in 93 games and batted .283 with 11 home runs and 40 runs batted in.

After the season, the team exercised its $2.1 million option to bring Refsnyder back for the 2025 season. He batted .269 with nine home runs in 70 games. He missed two weeks in August with an oblique muscle injury. In his first playoff appearance since 2015, he batted 0-for-5 with a walk as Boston lost to the Yankees in the AL Wild Card Series.

=== Seattle Mariners (2026) ===
On December 22, 2025, Refsnyder signed a one-year, $6.25 million contract with the Seattle Mariners. He was added to be a platoon batter, facing left-handed pitchers. Refsnyder became the fourth MLB player born in South Korea to play for Seattle. He started the year 0-for-18, then went on the paternity list. Refsnyder hit a home run on the first pitch he saw in his return to the team, a leadoff home run against the Texas Rangers. Refsnyder was placed on the injured list on June 29 due to inflammation in his right knee. The Mariners activated Refsnyder on July 28. In his return, he hit a home run and double against the Los Angeles Dodgers. Seattle released Refsnyder, along with catcher Mitch Garver, on August 4 following the trade deadline. In 53 games with the Mariners, Refsnyder hit .140 with four home runs.

== Personal life ==
Refsnyder met his wife, Monica (née Drake), while they both attended the University of Arizona in 2012. She is an All-American swimmer and competed in the 2008 and 2012 United States Olympic trials. They married in December 2015. Their first child was born in 2021. Their third child was born in 2026.

Refsnyder's sister, who is also adopted from South Korea, played college softball at Kenyon College. Their father played college basketball at Muhlenberg College. Refsnyder is supportive of adoption. He helped to design a T-shirt with Athletes Brand to raise money for A Kid's Place, an organization in the Tampa Bay area that helps foster children.

== See also ==
- List of Major League Baseball players from South Korea
- International adoption of South Korean children
