= Hyeseong Kim =

South Korean baseball player (born 1999)

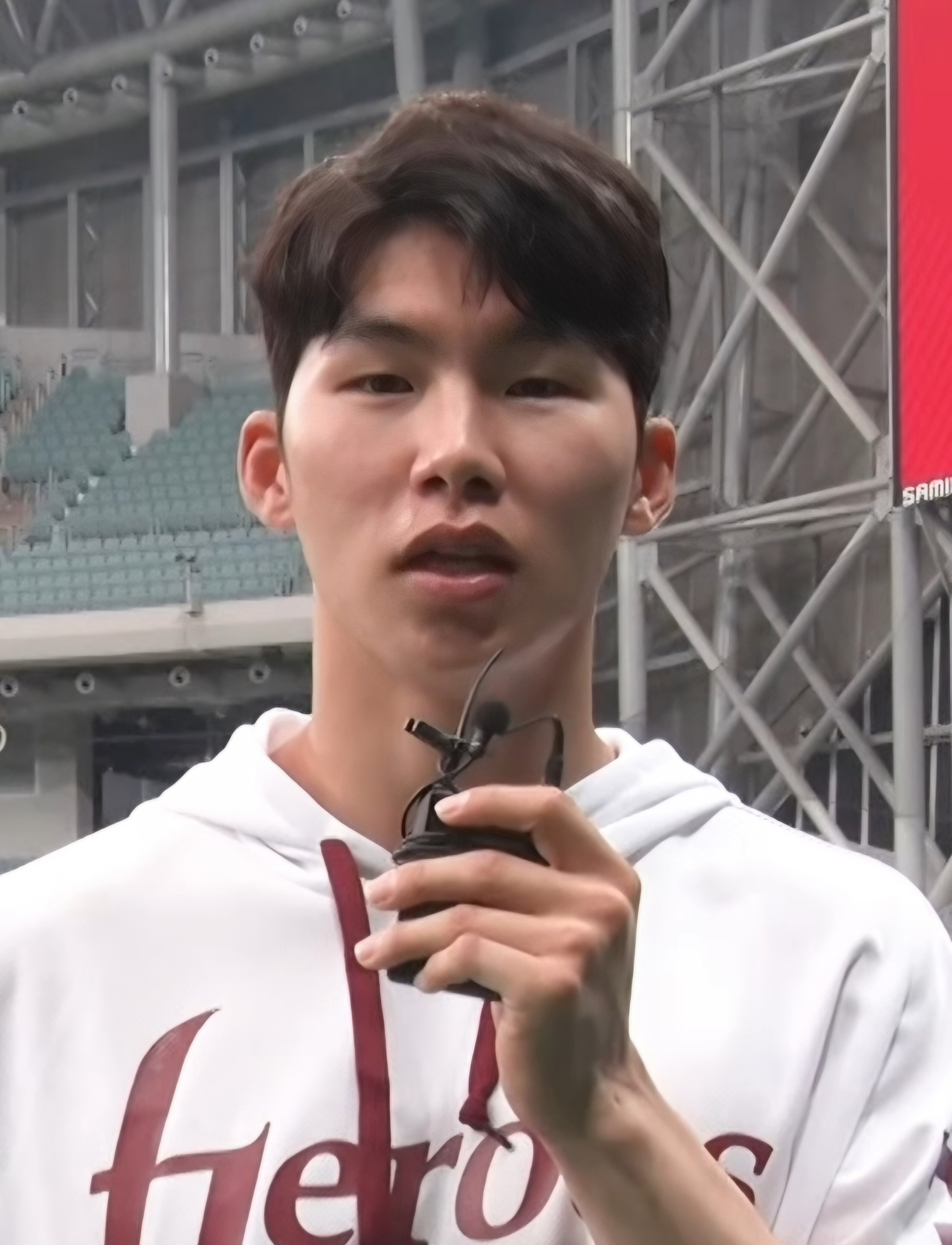
- Kim with the Kiwoom Heroes in 2020

Los Angeles Dodgers – No. 6
- Second baseman, Shortstop & Center fielder
- Born: January 27, 1999 (age 27); Koyang, Kyŏnggi Province, South Korea
- Bats: Left Throws: Right

Professional debut
- KBO: June 28, 2017, for the Nexen Heroes
- MLB: May 3, 2025, for the Los Angeles Dodgers

KBO statistics (through 2024 season)
- Batting average: .304
- Hits: 1,043
- Home runs: 37
- Runs batted in: 386
- Stolen bases: 211

MLB statistics (through 2026 season)
- Batting average: .271
- Home runs: 4
- Runs batted in: 28
- Stolen bases: 18
- Stats at Baseball Reference

Teams
- Nexen / Kiwoom Heroes (2017–2024); Los Angeles Dodgers (2025–present)

Career highlights and awards
- KBO: 4× KBO Golden Glove Award (2021–2024); KBO stolen base leader (2021); MLB: World Series champion (2025)
Medals
Men's baseball
Representing South Korea
Asian Games
Gold medal – first place	2022 Hangzhou	Team

- Hyeseong Kim
- Hangul: 김혜성
- Hanja: 金慧成
- RR: Gim Hyeseong
- MR: Kim Hyesŏng

Hyeseong Kim (Korean: 김혜성; born January 27, 1999) is a South Korean professional baseball second baseman, shortstop, and center fielder for the Los Angeles Dodgers of Major League Baseball (MLB). Nicknamed "The Comet", he is well known for his speed. Kim previously played in the KBO League for the Kiwoom Heroes. He made his MLB debut on May 3, 2025, with the Dodgers.

Kim is the only KBO player to receive the Golden Glove Award at shortstop and second base. In 2025 Kim joined Byung-hyun Kim as the second Korean-born player to win a World Series, and the first position player to do so.

== Early life and education ==
In 2016, Kim received the Lee Young-min Batting Award, given to the top-hitting high school player in South Korea. Kim was drafted by the Nexen Heroes of the KBO league in the second round of the 2017 draft from Dongsan High School in Incheon, South Korea. He was part of the same draft class as Lee Jung-hoo and later came to be teammates and friends with him.

== Career ==
=== Nexen Heroes (Now Kiwoom Heroes) ===
Kim made his debut on June 28, 2017, against the NC Dinos where he had 3 at-bats in 6 games before being sent down to the KBO Futures League, the KBO minor league. He was later called up again on Sept 1. He finished the 2017 season playing 16 games with a batting average of 0.188 and OPS of 0.548.

In the 2018 season, he became a starter for the Heroes and recorded a batting average of 0.270 with OPS of 0.695 in 138 games. His skills, however, continued to go up from there as he ended his KBO career batting .304 with 37 home runs, 386 RBI and 211 stolen bases in 953 games for the Heroes, who became the Kiwoom Heroes in 2019. He also won four KBO Golden Glove Awards for his great defensive ability.

In his final season in the KBO League, Kim played in 127 games for Kiwoom, slashing .326/.383/.458 with 30 stolen bases and career-highs in home runs (11) and RBI (75). On December 4, 2024, the Heroes posted Kim to Major League Baseball (MLB) as a free agent.

=== Los Angeles Dodgers ===
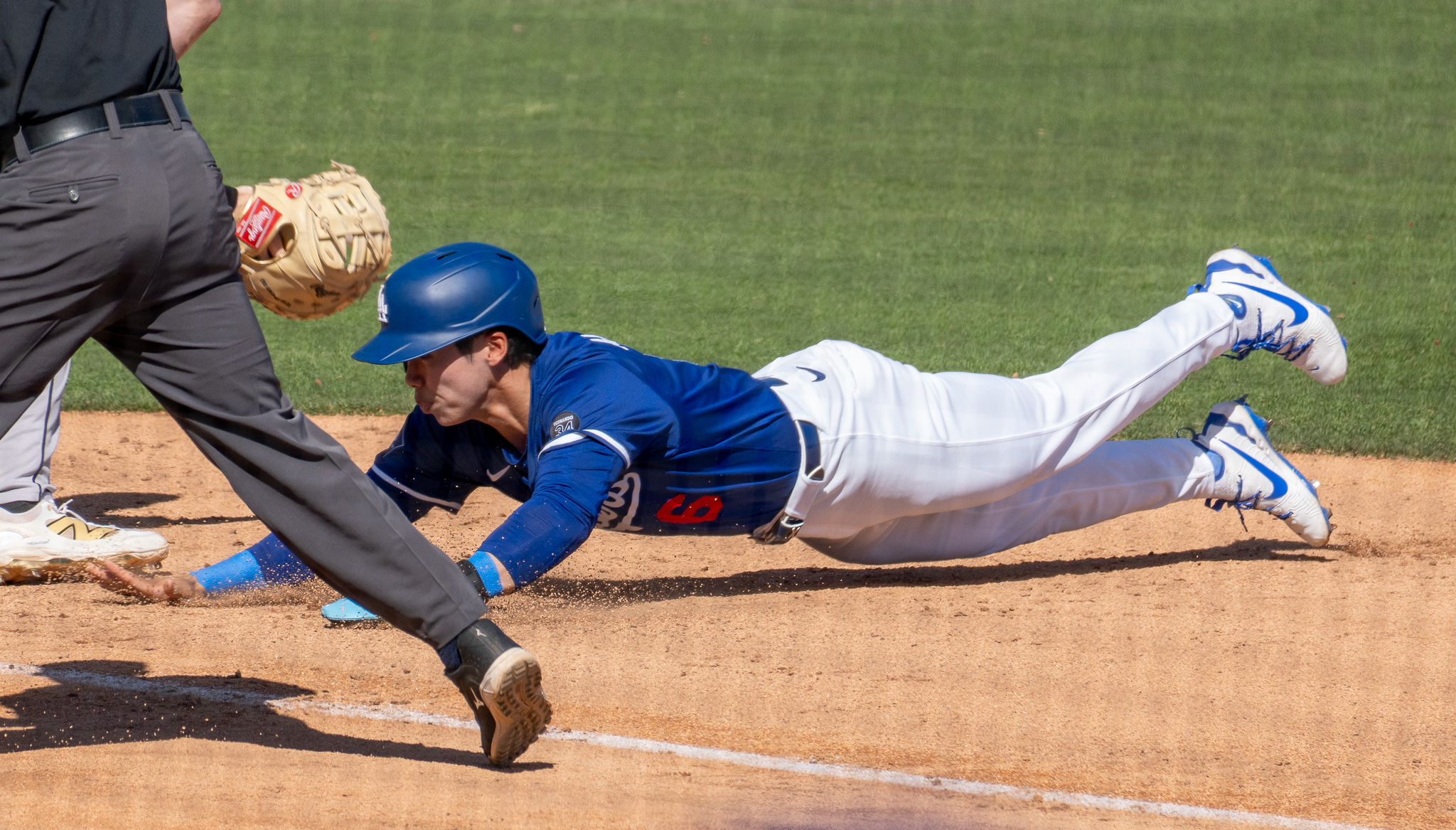
Kim in March 2025

On January 3, 2025, Kim signed a three-year, $12.5 million guaranteed contract, which also contained two additional option years that would increase the value to $22 million, with the Los Angeles Dodgers of Major League Baseball. The Dodgers also had to pay an additional posting fee of $2.5 million to the Heroes. On March 11, the Dodgers announced that Kim, after struggling with the bat in spring training games, would start the season in Triple-A with the Oklahoma City Comets. On May 3, Kim was called up to the major leagues and he made his MLB debut as a defensive replacement that night against the Atlanta Braves. Kim recorded his first MLB hit, against Sandy Alcántara of the Miami Marlins, on May 5 in his first start. He had two hits, an RBI, stole a base and scored a run in the game. His first MLB home run was off Gunnar Hoglund of the Athletics on May 14. He spent all of August on the injured list as a result of left shoulder bursitis and did not rejoin the team until September 2. While he had been the team's primary second baseman before the injury, his playing time was greatly reduced upon his return. He finished the season by batting .280 with three home runs and 17 RBI in 71 games and also stole 13 bases.

Kim was on the Dodgers postseason roster but only appeared in two games. In the bottom of the 11th inning of Game 4 of the National League Division Series, against the Philadelphia Phillies, he replaced Tommy Edman as a pinch runner then scored the series-winning run when relief pitcher Orion Kerkering committed a throwing error. His second appearance was as a defensive replacement, at second base, recording the first putout in the bottom of the 11th and final inning of Game 7 of the World Series, which the Dodgers would go on to win.

On March 22, 2026, the Dodgers announced that Kim would begin the season with Triple-A Oklahoma City. On March 29 with the Comets, he had his career best game going five for five in a single game. This was his first five hit game of his U.S. career. Kim was recalled to the majors by the Dodgers on April 5. He played in 43 games for the Dodgers, batting .259 with one home run and 11 RBI's, before being optioned to Oklahoma City for the rest of the regular season on May 29th. In the minors he played in 85 games and batted .262 with three home runs, 31 RBI and 15 stolen bases. Despite not having appeared with the major league squad for more than four months, he was included on the Dodgers' NLDS roster against the Atlanta Braves. He made one appearance as a defensive replacement and was left off the roster for the subsequent series.

== See also ==
- List of Major League Baseball players from South Korea
