= List of Major League Baseball players from South Korea =

Location of South Korea (green)

This is an alphabetical list of baseball players from South Korea who have played in Major League Baseball since 1994. There have been 31 players in total from South Korea.

== Current players ==
Player	Debut	Position	Teams	Ref
Ji-hwan Bae	September 23, 2022; 23 years, 59 days	Infielder	Pittsburgh Pirates (2022–2025); Milwaukee Brewers (2026–present)	
Ha-seong Kim	April 1, 2021; 25 years, 166 days	Infielder	San Diego Padres (2021–2024); Tampa Bay Rays (2025); Atlanta Braves (2025–present)	
Hye-seong Kim	May 3, 2025; 26 years, 96 days	Infielder	Los Angeles Dodgers (2025–present)	
Jung-hoo Lee	March 28, 2024; 25 years, 221 days	Outfielder	San Francisco Giants (2024–present)	
Rob Refsnyder	July 11, 2015; 24 years, 107 days	Outfielder	New York Yankees (2015–2017); Toronto Blue Jays (2017); Tampa Bay Rays (2018); Texas Rangers (2020); Minnesota Twins (2021); Boston Red Sox (2022–2025); Seattle Mariners (2026–present)	
Sung-mun Song	April 26, 2026; 29 years, 240 days	Infielder	San Diego Padres (2026–present)	

== Former players ==
Player	Debut	Final Game	Games	Position	Teams	Ref
Cha-seung Baek	August 8, 2004; 24 years, 71 days	September 28, 2008	61	Pitcher	Seattle Mariners (2004, 2006–2008); San Diego Padres (2008)	
Jung-keun Bong	April 23, 2002; 21 years, 282 days	June 20, 2004	49	Pitcher	Atlanta Braves (2002–2003); Cincinnati Reds (2004)	
Jin-ho Cho	July 4, 1998; 22 years, 323 days	July 30, 1999	13	Pitcher	Boston Red Sox (1998–1999)	
Hee-seop Choi	September 3, 2002; 23 years, 171 days	October 2, 2005	363	Infielder	Chicago Cubs (2002–2003); Florida Marlins (2004); Los Angeles Dodgers (2004–2005)	
Ji-man Choi	April 5, 2016; 24 years, 322 days	October 1, 2023	525	Infielder	Los Angeles Angels (2016); New York Yankees (2017); Milwaukee Brewers (2018); Tampa Bay Rays (2018–2022); Pittsburgh Pirates (2023); San Diego Padres (2023)	
Shin-soo Choo	April 21, 2005; 22 years, 282 days	September 27, 2020	1,652	Outfielder	Seattle Mariners (2005–2006); Cleveland Indians (2006–2012); Cincinnati Reds (2013); Texas Rangers (2014–2020)	
Woo-suk Go	July 9, 2026; 27 years, 337 days	July 20, 2026	4	Pitcher	Minnesota Twins (2026)	
Jae-gyun Hwang	June 28, 2017; 29 years, 335 days	August 1, 2017	18	Infielder	San Francisco Giants (2017)	
Jung-ho Kang	April 8, 2015; 28 years, 3 days	July 29, 2019	297	Infielder	Pittsburgh Pirates (2015–2016, 2018–2019)	
Byung-hyun Kim	May 29, 1999; 20 years, 128 days	September 28, 2007	394	Pitcher	Arizona Diamondbacks (1999–2003, 2007); Boston Red Sox (2003–2004); Colorado Rockies (2005–2007); Florida Marlins (2007)	
Hyun-soo Kim	April 10, 2016; 28 years, 89 days	September 30, 2017	191	Outfielder	Baltimore Orioles (2016–2017); Philadelphia Phillies (2017)	
Kwang-hyun Kim	July 24, 2020; 32 years, 2 days	October 2, 2021	35	Pitcher	St. Louis Cardinals (2020–2021)	
Sun-woo Kim	June 15, 2001; 23 years, 284 days	September 17, 2006	118	Pitcher	Boston Red Sox (2001–2002); Montreal Expos (2002–2004); Washington Nationals (2005); Colorado Rockies (2005–2006); Cincinnati Reds (2006)	
Dae-sung Koo	April 4, 2005; 35 years, 245 days	August 20, 2005	33	Pitcher	New York Mets (2005)	
Dae-ho Lee	April 4, 2016; 33 years, 288 days	October 2, 2016	104	Infielder	Seattle Mariners (2016)	
Sang-hoon Lee	June 29, 2000; 29 years, 110 days	October 1, 2000	9	Pitcher	Boston Red Sox (2000)	
Chang-yong Lim	September 7, 2013; 37 years, 95 days	September 27, 2013	6	Pitcher	Chicago Cubs (2013)	
Seung-hwan Oh	April 3, 2016; 33 years, 263 days	May 30, 2019	232	Pitcher	St. Louis Cardinals (2016–2017); Toronto Blue Jays (2018); Colorado Rockies (2018–2019)	
Byung-ho Park	April 4, 2016; 29 years, 269 days	June 28, 2016	62	Infielder	Minnesota Twins (2016)	
Chan-ho Park	April 8, 1994; 20 years, 282 days	October 1, 2010	479	Pitcher	Los Angeles Dodgers (1994–2001, 2008); Texas Rangers (2002–2005); San Diego Padres (2005–2006); New York Mets (2007); Philadelphia Phillies (2009); New York Yankees (2010); Pittsburgh Pirates (2010)	
Hoy-jun Park	July 16, 2021; 25 years, 100 days	September 7, 2022	68	Infielder	New York Yankees (2021); Pittsburgh Pirates (2021–2022)	
Hyun-jin Ryu	April 2, 2013; 26 years, 8 days	September 30, 2023	186	Pitcher	Los Angeles Dodgers (2013–2014, 2016–2019); Toronto Blue Jays (2020–2023)	
Jae-kuk Ryu	May 14, 2006; 22 years, 349 days	April 9, 2008	28	Pitcher	Chicago Cubs (2006); Tampa Bay Rays (2007–2008)	
Jae-weong Seo	July 21, 2002; 25 years, 58 days	May 29, 2007	123	Pitcher	New York Mets (2002–2005); Los Angeles Dodgers (2006); Tampa Bay Devil Rays (2006–2007)	
Hyeon-jong Yang	April 26, 2021; 33 years, 56 days	September 13, 2021	12	Pitcher	Texas Rangers (2021)	

== Awards and honors ==
=== All-Star selections ===
Player	Age	Season	League	Team	Position	Note	Ref
Chan-ho Park	28	2001	NL	Los Angeles Dodgers	P	L; 9.00 ERA (1 IP, 1 ER), 1 K	
Byung-hyun Kim	23	2002	NL	Arizona Diamondbacks	P	BS; 54.00 ERA (0.1 IP, 2 ER)	
Shin-soo Choo	36	2018	AL	Texas Rangers	DH	.500 BA (2 AB, 1 H), 1 R	
Hyun-jin Ryu	32	2019	NL	Los Angeles Dodgers	P (SP)	0.00 ERA (1 IP)	

=== Gold Glove Award ===
- Ha-seong Kim: 2023 NL Utility Player (San Diego Padres)

=== Player of the Month ===
- Shin-soo Choo: September 2008 AL (Cleveland Indians)
- Shin-soo Choo (2): September 2015 AL (Texas Rangers)

=== Pitcher of the Month ===
- Chan-ho Park: July 1998 NL (Los Angeles Dodgers)
- Hyun-jin Ryu: May 2019 NL (Los Angeles Dodgers)

=== Rookie of the Month ===
- Hee-seop Choi: April 2003 NL (Chicago Cubs)
- Jung-ho Kang: July 2015 NL (Pittsburgh Pirates)

=== Player of the Week ===
- Chan-ho Park: September 18–24, 2000 NL (Los Angeles Dodgers)
- Byung-hyun Kim: July 8–14, 2002 NL (Arizona Diamondbacks)
- Shin-soo Choo: April 12–18, 2010 AL (Cleveland Indians)
- Shin-soo Choo (2): September 13–19, 2010 AL (Cleveland Indians)
- Jung-ho Kang: September 5–11, 2016 NL (Pittsburgh Pirates)
- Hyun-jin Ryu: May 6–12, 2019 NL (Los Angeles Dodgers)

== Postseason appearances ==
Player	Seasons	Positions	WC		DS		CS		World Series		Refs
Player	Seasons	Positions	Series won	Games played	Series won	Games played	Series won	Games played	Series won	Games played	Refs
Hee-seop Choi	2004 Los Angeles Dodgers	PH			L	1					
Ji-man Choi	2019 Tampa Bay Rays; 2020 Tampa Bay Rays; 2021 Tampa Bay Rays; 2022 Tampa Bay Rays	1B	W W L	1; 2 2	L W L	5; 5; 3	W	5	L	6	
Shin-soo Choo	2013 Cincinnati Reds; 2015 Texas Rangers; 2016 Texas Rangers	CF; RF; RF	L	1	L L	5; 1					
Byung-hyun Kim	2001 Arizona Diamondbacks; 2002 Arizona Diamondbacks; 2003 Boston Red Sox	P			W L W	1; 1; 1	W	3	W	2	
Ha-seong Kim	2022 San Diego Padres; 2026 Atlanta Braves	SS	W W	3; 2	W L	4; 2	L	5			
Hye-seong Kim	2025 Los Angeles Dodgers; 2026 Los Angeles Dodgers	2B			W W	1; 1			W	1	
Hyun-soo Kim	2016 Baltimore Orioles	LF	L	1							
Kwang-hyun Kim	2020 St. Louis Cardinals	P	L	1							
Seung-hwan Oh	2018 Colorado Rockies	P	W	1	L	2					
Chan-ho Park	2006 San Diego Padres; 2008 Los Angeles Dodgers; 2009 Philadelphia Phillies	P			L	1	L W	4; 4	L	4	
Rob Refsnyder	2015 New York Yankees; 2025 Boston Red Sox	2B; DH	L L	1; 2							
Hyun-jin Ryu	2013 Los Angeles Dodgers; 2014 Los Angeles Dodgers; 2018 Los Angeles Dodgers; 2019 Los Angeles Dodgers; 2020 Toronto Blue Jays	P	L	1	W L W L	1; 1; 1; 1	L W	1 2	L	1	

== See also ==
- Lists of Major League Baseball players
- List of current Major League Baseball players by nationality
