= Choi Hyang-nam =

South Korean baseball player

- Relief pitcher
- Born: March 28, 1971 (age 55); Sinan, Jeollanam-do, South Korea
- Bats: Right Throws: Right

KBO debut
- August 17, 1990, for the Haitai Tigers

KBO statistics
- Win–loss record: 50–65
- Saves: 15
- Earned run average: 4.04
- Strikeouts: 701
- Stats at Baseball Reference

Teams
- Haitai Tigers (1990–1996); LG Twins (1997–2003); Kia Tigers (2004–2005); Lotte Giants (2007–2008, 2011); Kia Tigers (2012–2013)

Choi Hyang-nam (born March 28, 1971, in Sinan, Jeollanam-do, South Korea) is a retired professional baseball pitcher.

Choi is a Korean baseball pitcher who played professionally in Korea since his debut in 1990. He pitched for the Haitai Tigers, the LG Twins and the KIA Tigers in Korean baseball from 1990 to 2005 before finally getting a shot in the United States when he signed with the Cleveland Indians in 2006 and played the season with the Buffalo Bisons. He was 8–5 with a 2.37 ERA with Buffalo in 34 games, 11 of them starts and struck out 103 batters while only walking 35.

He returned to Korea with the Lotte Giants in 2007.

In 2009, he joined the St. Louis Cardinals for spring training but failed to make the club and was released. He soon after signed with the Los Angeles Dodgers and was assigned to the AAA Albuquerque Isotopes. Choi pitched great out of the bullpen for Albuquerque, going 9–2 with a 2.34 ERA. He walked only 21 and struck out 77. He was released on June 27, 2010.

He also played for the Algodoneros de Guasave of the Mexican Pacific League during the 2009–10 season. In two appearances for the Algodoneros, Choi recorded a 4.50 ERA and three strikeouts across 4 innings pitched.

In March 2015, Choi joined the Wiener Neustadt Diving Ducks of the Austrian Baseball Bundesliga. He made nine appearances for the team, posting a 4–2 record, with a 2.70 ERA, 47 strikeouts and 12 walks across 60 innings pitched.
