= Sung-mun Song =

South Korean baseball player (born 1996)

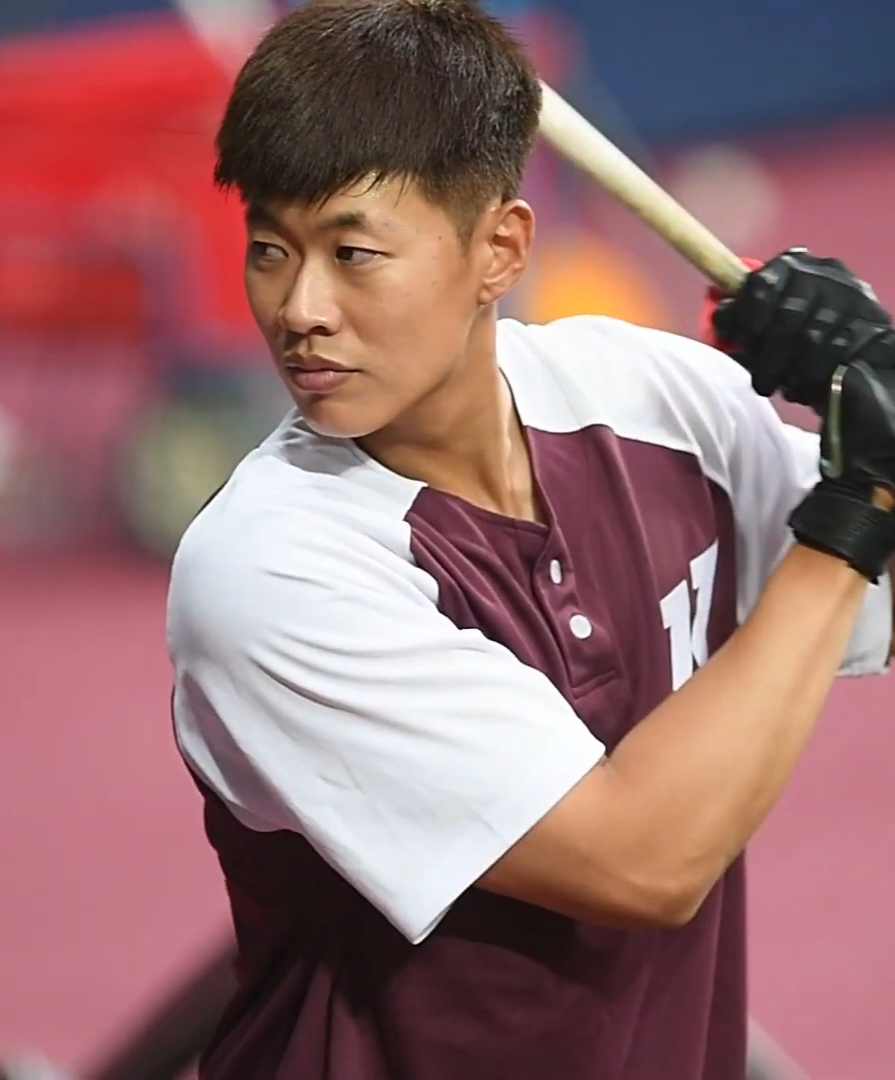
- Song with the Kiwoom Heroes

San Diego Padres – No. 24
- Infielder
- Born: 29 August 1996 (age 30); Seoul, South Korea
- Bats: Left Throws: Right

Professional debut
- KBO: May 6, 2015, for the Nexen Heroes
- MLB: April 26, 2026, for the San Diego Padres

KBO statistics (through 2025 season)
- Batting average: .283
- Home runs: 80
- Runs batted in: 454

MLB statistics (through 2026 season)
- Batting average: .191
- Home runs: 1
- Runs batted in: 17
- Stats at Baseball Reference

Teams
- Nexen / Kiwoom Heroes (2015–2025); San Diego Padres (2026–present)

Sung-mun Song (born 29 August 1996) is a South Korean professional baseball third baseman for the San Diego Padres of Major League Baseball (MLB). He has played in the KBO League for the Nexen / Kiwoom Heroes from 2015 to 2025 and joined the Padres in 2026.

== Career ==
=== Nexen / Kiwoom Heroes ===
Song debuted for the Nexen Heroes in 2015. He did not become a regular for the Heroes until 2019, and missed the 2020 season and beginning of the 2021 season while fulfilling military service. In 2024, Song was named an All-Star for the first time as well as team captain.

On August 4, 2025, the Heroes signed Song to a six-year contract extension worth ₩12 billion. He requested that the Heroes post him to Major League Baseball after the season.

=== San Diego Padres ===
On December 22, 2025, Song signed a four-year, $15 million contract with the San Diego Padres of MLB. The team will also pay for an interpreter and roundtrip tickets from South Korea. Song will receive an additional $1 million signing bonus in two installments.

Song began the 2026 season on the injured list due to a strained oblique muscle. He was activated and optioned to the Triple-A El Paso Chihuahuas on April 16. Song made his MLB debut against the Arizona Diamondbacks on April 26 during the MLB Mexico City Series.
