= Austrian Baseball Bundesliga =

Austrian baseball league

- Sport: Baseball
- Founded: 1985; 41 years ago
- First season: 1985; 41 years ago
- No. of teams: 7
- Country: Austria
- Continent: Europe
- Most recent champion: Wiener Neustadt Diving Ducks (3rd title)
- Most titles: Vienna Metrostars (15)
- Relegation to: Baseball 2. Bundesliga

The Austrian Baseball Bundesliga, or simply Baseball Bundesliga, is the highest level of baseball in Austria. The league was established in 1985 as the Austrian Baseball League with only four teams competing. In 2017, the league was renamed Baseball League Austria, and in 2020, it adopted its current name, Baseball Bundesliga. The league is currently contested by seven teams and the games are played from April to August with the playoffs beginning in September.

== History ==
Baseball was introduced into Austria in the 1940s by United States military personnel stationed in the country after the Second World War. The sport was played at the Hohe Warte Stadium in Vienna and at the Figl Air Base near Tulln an der Donau. However, after the occupation ended in 1955, interest in and development of baseball declined.

Interest in baseball saw a revival in the 1980s. Three baseball clubs were established in Vienna in 1982: Homerunners, Roadrunners and City Boys; only the Homerunners, now the Vienna Metrostars, are still active. The league was established in 1985 as the Austrian Baseball League, with its inaugural season featuring four teams: Linz Bandits, Vienna City Boys, Vienna Homerunners and Vienna Roadrunners. The top two teams from the regular season faced off in a final series to determine the Austrian baseball champion. The City Boys folded after the 1985 season, leaving only three teams to contest the 1986 season.

The number of teams fluctuated between five and eight per season until 1997, when the top flight was set at eight teams, along with the establishment of a four-team playoff system to determine the winner. In 2017, the league changed its name to Baseball League Austria and expanded the playoffs to six teams. In 2020, it adopted its current name, Baseball Bundesliga.

== Current teams ==
Team	City	Field	Established
Dornbirn Indians	(Vorarlberg) Dornbirn	Sportanlage Rohrbach	1990
Hard Bulls	(Vorarlberg) Hard	Ballpark am See	1991
Schwechat Blue Bats	(Lower Austria) Schwechat	Batsfield	1989
Traiskirchen Grasshoppers	(Lower Austria) Traiskirchen	Hoppersfield	1991
Wiener Neustadt Diving Ducks	(Lower Austria) Wiener Neustadt	Ducksfield	1987
Vienna Metrostars	Vienna	Ballpark Freudenau	1982
Vienna Wanderers	Vienna	Ballpark Spenadlwiese	1986

Location of teams in the 2025 Austrian Baseball Bundesliga season

== Winners ==
The following is a list of Austrian Baseball Bundesliga winners from 1985 to 2024.

Team	Champions	Runners-up	Winning seasons	Runners-up seasons
Vienna Metrostars	15	9	1985, 1986, 1987, 1988, 1989, 1992, 1994, 1996, 2005, 2006, 2007, 2011, 2014, 2018, 2020	1990, 1991, 1993, 1997, 2013, 2019, 2021, 2023, 2024
Vienna Wanderers	6	4	1990, 2009, 2012, 2013, 2015, 2022	1992, 2001, 2005, 2017
Attnang-Puchheim Athletics	4	1	2008, 2010, 2016, 2017	2011
Vienna Bulldogs	4	3	1991, 1993, 1997, 2000	1994, 1995, 1998
Dornbirn Indians	3	3	1999, 2003, 2019	2014, 2018, 2022
Wiener Neustadt Diving Ducks	3	5	2021, 2023, 2024	2003, 2004, 2012, 2015, 2016
Schwaz Tigres	2	4	1995, 1998	1989, 1996, 2008, 2009
Kufstein Vikings	2	4	2002, 2004	2000, 2006, 2007, 2008
Hard Bulls	1	1	2001	2002
Vienna Roadrunners	0	2		1985, 1986
Vienna Bucks	0	2		1987, 1988
Linz Bandits	0	1		1999
Traiskirchen Grasshoppers	0	1		2020
