= 2002 World Junior Baseball Championship =

Tournament details
- Country: Canada
- Dates: August 2 – 12
- Teams: 12
- Defending champions: South Korea

Final positions
- Champions: Cuba (10th title)
- Runners-up: Chinese Taipei
- Third place: United States
- Fourth place: Canada

Awards
- MVP: (United States) Delmon Young

The 2002 World Junior AAA Championship was held in Sherbrooke, Quebec, Canada. Games were held at Amedée Roy Stadium in Sherbrooke and Julien Morin Stadium in Coaticook.

== Final standings ==
Classification
1	Cuba
2	Chinese Taipei
3	United States
4	Canada
5	Australia
6	South Korea
7	Venezuela
8	Panama
9	Brazil
10	Netherlands
11	Italy
12	Spain

== Medalists ==
Event	Gold	Silver	Bronze
Tournament	Cuba	Chinese Taipei	United States; Jeff Allison; Chad Billingsley; Tyler Bullock; Allen Craig; Austin Creps; Tim Gustafson; Ian Kennedy; Chris Lubanski; Lastings Milledge; Bryan Opdyke; Michael Rogers; Jarrod Saltalamacchia; Ian Stewart; Philip Stringer; Chuck Tiffany; Justin Tordi; David Uribes; Delmon Young

== Awards ==
Awards	Player
Most Valuable Player	(United States) Delmon Young
Outstanding Defensive Player	(Venezuela) Vicente Cafaro

All-Tournament Team
Position	Player
Catcher	(Australia) Michael Sadler
First Base	(United States) Ian Stewart
Second Base	(Venezuela) Vicente Cafaro
Third Base	(Cuba) Yulieski Gurriel
Shortstop	(Canada) Shawn Bowman
Outfield	(United States) Lastings Milledge
Outfield	(Cuba) Eliu Torres
Outfield	(Canada) Adam Loewen
Designated Hitter	(United States) Delmon Young
Left-handed Pitcher	(Chinese Taipei) Wei-Yin Chen
Right-handed Pitcher	(Cuba) Juan Linares

== See also ==
- World Junior Baseball Championship
