= 2019 U-18 Baseball World Cup =

Tournament details
- Country: South Korea
- City: Busan
- Dates: August 30 - September 8
- Teams: 12
- Defending champions: United States

Final positions
- Champions: Chinese Taipei (3rd title)
- Runners-up: United States
- Third place: South Korea
- Fourth place: Australia

Tournament statistics
- Games played: 50

The 2019 U-18 Baseball World Cup or the XXVIV U-18 Baseball World Cup was an international baseball tournament held by the World Baseball Softball Confederation for players 18-year-old and younger. The 2019 edition was held in Gijang, South Korea from August 30 to September 8, 2019.

== Format ==
First Round: The twelve participating nations were drawn into two groups of 6, in which single round robin will occur. The top 3 nations from each group advances to the Super Round, while the bottom 3 nations from each group advance to the Consolation Round.

Consolation Round: The 6 nations in this round play one game against the teams they have not played yet. (example: The 4th placed team from Group A will play the bottom three teams from Group B)

Super Round: The format in the Super Round is similar to that of the Consolation Round. Each team plays the top three teams from the opposing group. (example: The 1st placed team from Group B will play the top three teams from Group A) The standings for this round will include the 2 games played against the 2 other Second Round qualifiers from the team's First Round group, and the 3 games played in the Second Round, for a total of 5 games. The 3rd and 4th place finishers advance to the Bronze Medal Game, and the 1st and 2nd place finishers advance to the Gold Medal Game.

Finals: The Finals consist of the Bronze Medal Game, contested by the 3rd and 4th place finishers, and the Gold Medal Game, contested by the 1st and 2nd place finishers.

== Qualification ==
=== Qualified teams ===
Team	Qualified as	Qualification date	Appearance in finals	Last appearance	Consecutive streak	Previous best performance
South Korea	Hosts	13 July 2018	20th	2017	16	Champions (1981, 1994, 2000, 2006, 2008)
Netherlands	2018 U-18 European Baseball Championship champions	15 July 2018	–	2017	2	–
Spain	2018 U-18 European Baseball Championship runners-up	15 July 2018	–	–	1	–
Chinese Taipei (Note: Chinese Taipei is the official WBSC designation for the team representing the state officially referred to as the Republic of China, more commonly known as Taiwan. (See also political status of Taiwan for details.))	2018 U-18 Asian Baseball Championship runners-up	10 September 2018	–	–	–	Champions (1983, 2010)
Japan	2018 U-18 Asian Baseball Championship 3rd place	10 September 2018	9th	2017	5	Runners-up (1982, 2004, 2013, 2015)
China	2018 U-18 Asian Baseball Championship 4th place	10 September 2018	–	–	1	–
United States	2018 U-18 Pan American Baseball Championship champions	2 December 2018	29th	2017	29	Champions (1982, 1988, 1989, 1995, 1999, 2012, 2013, 2012, 2017)
Panama	2018 U-18 Pan American Baseball Championship runners-up	2 December 2018	13th	2012	1	Fourth place (1984, 1999)
Canada	2018 U-18 Pan American Baseball Championship 3rd place	2 December 2018	–	–	–	Champions (1991)
Nicaragua	2018 U-18 Pan American Baseball Championship 4th place	2 December 2018	–	2017	2	–
Australia	2019 U-18 Oceania Baseball Championship champions	27 January 2019	–	–	–	Runners-up (2010)
South Africa	2018 U-18 African Baseball Championship champions	–	–	–	–	–

== Round 1 ==
=== Group A ===
==== Standings ====
Pos	Team	Pld	W	L	RF	RA	PCT	GB	Qualification
1	South Korea (H)	5	4	1	29	12	.800	—	Advance to super round
2	Canada	5	3	2	48	18	.600 (Note: Three-way tie decided by TQB)	1	Advance to super round
3	Australia	5	3	2	26	15	.600	1	Advance to super round
4	Netherlands	5	3	2	22	27	.600	1	Advance to consolation round
5	Nicaragua	5	2	3	11	27	.400	2	Advance to consolation round
6	China	5	0	5	16	53	.000	4	Advance to consolation round

Source: WBSC
(H) Hosts
Notes:

Date	Local time	Road team	Score	Home team	Inn.	Venue	Game duration	Attendance	Boxscore
Aug 30, 2019	09:30	China	3-17	Canada	F/7	Gijang-Hyundai Dream Ballpark III	2:13	108	Boxscore
Aug 30, 2019	14:00	Nicaragua	3-2	Australia		Gijang-Hyundai Dream Ballpark III	2:24	168	Boxscore
Aug 30, 2019	19:00	Netherlands	4-5	South Korea		Gijang-Hyundai Dream Ballpark	2:49	5,324	Boxscore
Aug 31, 2019	15:30	Netherlands	0-11	Canada	F/7	Gijang-Hyundai Dream Ballpark II	1:58	100	Boxscore
Aug 31, 2019	18:00	South Korea	0-1	Australia		Gijang-Hyundai Dream Ballpark	2:33	2,165	Boxscore
Aug 31, 2019	18:00	China	3-6	Nicaragua		Gijang-Hyundai Dream Ballpark II	2:26	102	Boxscore
Sep 1, 2019	12:00	Canada	5-8	South Korea		Gijang-Hyundai Dream Ballpark	2:45	700	Boxscore
Sep 1, 2019	12:00	Nicaragua	2-4	Netherlands		Gijang-Hyundai Dream Ballpark II	2:30	84	Boxscore
Sep 1, 2019	15:30	Australia	13-2	China		Gijang-Hyundai Dream Ballpark III	2:19	247	Boxscore
Sep 2, 2019	18:00	Nicaragua	0-9	South Korea	F/6 (rain)	Gijang-Hyundai Dream Ballpark	1:40	120	Boxscore
Sep 3, 2019	10:00	Netherlands	4-3	Australia		Gijang-Hyundai Dream Ballpark III	2:10	80	Boxscore
Sep 3, 2019	12:00	South Korea	7-2	China		Gijang-Hyundai Dream Ballpark	2:46	150	Boxscore
Sep 3, 2019	15:30	Canada	9-0	Nicaragua		Gijang-Hyundai Dream Ballpark III	2:56	93	Boxscore
Sep 4, 2019	11:00	China	6-10	Netherlands		Gijang-Hyundai Dream Ballpark III	2:56	247	Boxscore
Sep 4, 2019	11:00	Australia	7-6	Canada		Gijang-Hyundai Dream Ballpark II	2:39	80	Boxscore

=== Group B ===
==== Standings ====
Pos	Team	Pld	W	L	RF	RA	PCT	GB	Qualification
1	Japan	5	4	1	45	13	.800 (Note: Three-way tie decided by TQB)	—	Advance to super round
2	United States	5	4	1	39	23	.800	—	Advance to super round
3	Chinese Taipei	5	4	1	28	14	.800	—	Advance to super round
4	Spain	5	2	3	37	28	.400	2	Advance to consolation round
5	Panama	5	1	4	25	28	.200	3	Advance to consolation round
6	South Africa	5	0	5	10	78	.000	4	Advance to consolation round

Source: WBSC
Notes:

Date	Local time	Road team	Score	Home team	Inn.	Venue	Game duration	Attendance	Boxscore
Aug 30, 2019	12:00	Panama	1-4	Chinese Taipei		Gijang-Hyundai Dream Ballpark	2:48	1,032	Boxscore
Aug 30, 2019	12:00	Spain	2-4	Japan		Gijang-Hyundai Dream Ballpark II	2:08	230	Boxscore
Aug 30, 2019	19:00	South Africa	0-11	United States	F/7	Gijang-Hyundai Dream Ballpark II	1:56	70	Boxscore
Aug 31, 2019	10:00	Spain	12-3	Panama		Gijang-Hyundai Dream Ballpark III	3:35	80	Boxscore
Aug 31, 2019	12:00	Chinese Taipei	1-8	United States		Gijang-Hyundai Dream Ballpark II	2:44	400	Boxscore
Aug 31, 2019	12:00	Japan	19-0	South Africa	F/6	Gijang-Hyundai Dream Ballpark	2:09	517	Boxscore
Sep 1, 2019	10:00	South Africa	2-17	Panama	F/5	Gijang-Hyundai Dream Ballpark III	1:29	258	Boxscore
Sep 1, 2019	18:00	United States	7-16	Japan		Gijang-Hyundai Dream Ballpark	3:32	400	Boxscore
Sep 1, 2019	18:00	Spain	4-5	Chinese Taipei		Gijang-Hyundai Dream Ballpark II	3:22	70	Boxscore
Sep 2, 2019	18:00	Japan	1-3	Chinese Taipei	F/6 (rain)	Gijang-Hyundai Dream Ballpark II	1:58	75	Boxscore
Sep 3, 2019	12:00	United States	8-3	Spain		Gijang-Hyundai Dream Ballpark II	2:58	112	Boxscore
Sep 3, 2019	18:00	Japan	5-1	Panama	F/6 (rain)	Gijang-Hyundai Dream Ballpark	2:39	90	Boxscore
Sep 3, 2019	18:00	Chinese Taipei	15-0	South Africa	F/5	Gijang-Hyundai Dream Ballpark II	1:36	80	Boxscore
Sep 4, 2019	15:00	Panama	3-5	United States		Gijang-Hyundai Dream Ballpark II	2:52	102	Boxscore
Sep 4, 2019	15:00	South Africa	8-16	Spain		Gijang-Hyundai Dream Ballpark III	3:16	73	Boxscore

== Super round ==
Pos	Team	Pld	W	L	RF	RA	PCT	GB	Qualification
1	United States	5	4	1	35	23	.800	—	Advance to final
2	Chinese Taipei	5	3	2	30	23	.600 (Note: Head-to-head result: Chinese Taipei 12-0 Australia)	1	Advance to final
3	Australia	5	3	2	13	21	.600	1	Advance to third-place game
4	South Korea (H)	5	2	3	20	25	.400 (Note: Head-to-head result: Japan 4-5 South Korea)	2	Advance to third-place game
5	Japan	5	2	3	27	20	.400	2	
6	Canada	5	1	4	24	37	.200	3	

Source: WBSC
(H) Hosts
Notes:

Date	Local time	Road team	Score	Home team	Inn.	Venue	Game duration	Attendance	Boxscore
Sep 5, 2019	12:00	Australia	1-2	United States		Gijang-Hyundai Dream Ballpark II	2:07	285	Boxscore
Sep 5, 2019	12:00	Chinese Taipei	7-2	South Korea		Gijang-Hyundai Dream Ballpark	2:52	787	Boxscore
Sep 5, 2019	18:00	Canada	1-5	Japan		Gijang-Hyundai Dream Ballpark	2:31	687	Boxscore
Sep 6, 2019	12:00	Chinese Taipei	12-0	Australia	F/7	Gijang-Hyundai Dream Ballpark II	1:55	233	Boxscore
Sep 6, 2019	12:00	United States	10-0	Canada	F/7	Gijang-Hyundai Dream Ballpark	1:58	102	Boxscore
Sep 6, 2019	18:00	Japan	4-5	South Korea	F/10	Gijang-Hyundai Dream Ballpark	3:35	4,039	Boxscore
Sep 7, 2019	12:30	United States	8-5	South Korea		Gijang-Hyundai Dream Ballpark	3:23	650	Boxscore
Sep 7, 2019	12:30	Australia	4-1	Japan		Gijang-Hyundai Dream Ballpark II	3:02	469	Boxscore
Sep 7, 2019	18:00	Chinese Taipei	7-12	Canada		Gijang-Hyundai Dream Ballpark	3:04	80	Boxscore

== Consolation round ==
Pos	Team	Pld	W	L	RF	RA	PCT	GB
1	Netherlands	5	5	0	29	10	1.000	—
2	Spain	5	3	2	36	22	.600 (Note: Head-to-head result: Spain 12-3 Panama)	2
3	Panama	5	3	2	26	18	.600	2
4	Nicaragua	5	2	3	22	17	.400 (Note: Head-to-head result: China 3-6 Nicaragua)	3
5	China	5	2	3	24	19	.400	3
6	South Africa	5	0	5	11	62	.000	5

Source: WBSC
Notes:

Date	Local time	Road team	Score	Home team	Inn.	Venue	Game duration	Attendance	Boxscore
Sep 5, 2019	10:00	South Africa	1-11	Nicaragua	F/7	Gijang-Hyundai Dream Ballpark III	2:00	50	Boxscore
Sep 5, 2019	16:00	China	6-0	Spain		Gijang-Hyundai Dream Ballpark II	2:32	45	Boxscore
Sep 5, 2019	18:00	Panama	1-2	Netherlands		Gijang-Hyundai Dream Ballpark II	2:02	80	Boxscore
Sep 6, 2019	10:00	China	8-0	South Africa		Gijang-Hyundai Dream Ballpark III	2:17	32	Boxscore
Sep 6, 2019	16:00	Panama	2-1	Nicaragua		Gijang-Hyundai Dream Ballpark III	1:52	30	Boxscore
Sep 6, 2019	18:00	Netherlands	3-1	Spain		Gijang-Hyundai Dream Ballpark II	2:15	88	Boxscore
Sep 7, 2019	16:00	Nicaragua	2-7	Spain	F/7	Gijang-Hyundai Dream Ballpark III	1:57	51	Boxscore
Sep 7, 2019	19:30	China	1-3	Panama	F/7	Gijang-Hyundai Dream Ballpark III	1:42	42	Boxscore
Sep 8, 2019	10:00	South Africa	0-10	Netherlands	F/6	Gijang-Hyundai Dream Ballpark III	1:29	45	Boxscore

== Finals ==
=== Third-place game ===
Date	Local time	Road team	Score	Home team	Inn.	Venue	Game duration	Attendance	Boxscore
Sep 8, 2019	12:00	South Korea	6-5	Australia		Gijang-Hyundai Dream Ballpark	2:44	1,008	Boxscore

=== Championship ===
Date	Local time	Road team	Score	Home team	Inn.	Venue	Game duration	Attendance	Boxscore
Sep 8, 2019	18:00	Chinese Taipei	2-1	United States		Gijang-Hyundai Dream Ballpark	2:52	3,223	Boxscore

== Final standings ==
Rk	Team	W	L
1st place, gold medalist(s)	Chinese Taipei	7	2
Lost in final
2nd place, silver medalist(s)	United States	7	2
Failed to qualify for the final
3rd place, bronze medalist(s)	South Korea	6	3
Lost in 3rd place game
4	Australia	4	5
Failed to qualify for the finals
5	Japan	5	3
6	Canada	4	4
Failed to qualify for the super round
7	Netherlands	6	2
8	Spain	3	5
9	Panama	3	5
10	Nicaragua	3	5
11	China	2	6
12	South Africa	0	8

== U-18 All-World Team ==
Position	Player
C	(Spain) Juan González
1B	(Japan) Yuya Nirasawa
2B	(South Korea) Ji-chan Kim
3B	(Chinese Taipei) Shun-ho Wang
SS	(Canada) Austin Gomm
OF	(Netherlands) Darryl Collins
OF	(United States) Pete Crow-Armstrong
OF	(United States) Robert Hassell III
DH	(United States) Tyler Soderstrom
P	(Japan) Yasunobu Okugawa
P	(United States) Alejandro Rosario

== Statistics leaders ==
=== Batting ===
Statistic	Name	Total/Avg
Batting average*	(South Korea) Ji-chan Kim	.528
Hits	(South Korea) Ji-chan Kim	19
Runs	(United States) Robert Hassell III	13
Home runs	5 players	2
Runs batted in	(United States) Robert Hassell III	14
Strikeouts	(China) Binbin Lu (Australia) Liam McDonald	14
Walks	(China) Wentao Zhang	12
Stolen bases	(South Korea) Ji-chan Kim	10
On-base percentage*	(Netherlands) Ryson Polonius	.556
Slugging percentage*	(United States) Robert Hassell III	.886
OPS*	(United States) Robert Hassell III	1.434

* Minimum 2.7 plate appearances per game

=== Pitching ===
Statistic	Name	Total/Avg
Wins	(United States) Alejandro Rosario	3
Losses	8 players	2
Saves	3 players	2
Innings pitched	(Spain) Justin Luna	15.0
Hits allowed	(South Africa) Kade Smith	20
Runs allowed	(South Africa) Mila Burger	18
Earned runs allowed	(South Africa) Mila Burger (South Africa) Kade Smith	15
Earned run average*	(United States) Kyle Harrison (Chinese Taipei) Chien Yu	0.00**
Walks allowed	(Spain) Alex Tomé	15
Strikeouts	(Japan) Yasunobu Okugawa	18

* Minimum 0.8 innings pitched per game
** They are tied with others with a 0.00 ERA but they pitched the most innings (10.0)
