= 2025 U-18 Baseball World Cup =

Tournament details
- Country: Japan
- Dates: September 5–14
- Teams: 12

Final positions
- Champions: United States (11th title)
- Runners-up: Japan
- Third place: Chinese Taipei
- Fourth place: South Korea

Tournament statistics
- Games played: 50
- Best BA: (Australia) Ashton Kennedy (.444)
- Most HRs: Five tied (1)
- Most SBs: (Japan) Hyuma Okabe (7)
- Best ERA: (Cuba) Edenis Cruz (0.00)
- Most Ks (as pitcher): (South Korea) Joel Kim & (Japan) Shota Morishita (19)

Awards
- MVP: (United States) Coleman Borthwick

The 2025 U-18 Baseball World Cup or the XXXII U-18 Baseball World Cup is an international baseball tournament held by the World Baseball Softball Confederation for players 18-year-old and younger. The 2025 edition was held in Naha and Itoman, Japan from September 5 to 14, 2025.

== Format ==
First round: The twelve participating nations were drawn into two groups of 6, in which single round robin will occur. The top 3 nations from each group advances to the Super Round, while the bottom 3 nations from each group advance to the consolation round.

Placement round: The 6 nations in this round play one game against the teams they have not played yet. (example: The 4th placed team from Group A will play the bottom three teams from Group B)

Super round: The format in the super round is similar to that of the consolation round. Each team plays the top three teams from the opposing group. (example: The 1st placed team from Group B will play the top three teams from Group A) The standings for this round will include the 2 games played against the 2 other second-round qualifiers from the team's first-round group, and the 3 games played in the second round, for a total of 5 games. The 3rd and 4th-place finishers advance to the bronze-medal game, and the 1st and 2nd-place finishers advance to the gold-medal game.

Finals: The Finals consist of the Bronze Medal Game, contested by the 3rd and 4th-place finishers, and the gold-medal game, contested by the 1st and 2nd-place finishers.

== Teams ==
The following 12 teams qualified for the tournament.

Pool A	Pool B
Japan	Australia
Cuba	China
Italy	Germany
South Korea	Panama
Puerto Rico	Chinese Taipei^{1}
South Africa	United States

^{1}Republic of China, commonly known as Taiwan, due to complicated relations with People's Republic of China, is recognized by the name Chinese Taipei by most of the international organizations in sports competitions. For more information, please see Cross-Strait relations.

== First round ==
=== Group A ===
Pos	Team	Pld	W	L	RF	RA	PCT	GB	Qualification
1	Japan (H)	5	5	0	24	3	1.000	—	Advance to super round
2	South Korea	5	4	1	35	6	.800	1	Advance to super round
3	Puerto Rico	5	3	2	18	11	.600	2	Advance to super round
4	Cuba	5	2	3	18	7	.400	3	Advance to placement round
5	Italy	5	1	4	8	30	.200	4	Advance to placement round
6	South Africa	5	0	5	5	51	.000	5	Advance to placement round

Source: WBSC
(H) Hosts

Date	Local time	Road team	Score	Home team	Inn.	Venue	Game duration	Attendance	Boxscore
Sep 5, 2025	14:30	Puerto Rico	2–5	South Korea	7	Okinawa Cellular Stadium	2:31	237	Boxscore
Sep 5, 2025	14:30	Cuba	10–0	South Africa	F/5	Nishizaki Stadium	1:45	100	Boxscore
Sep 5, 2025	18:30	Italy	1–4	Japan	7	Okinawa Cellular Stadium	2:07	3,400	Boxscore
Sep 6, 2025	10:30	South Africa	1–9	Puerto Rico	7	Nishizaki Stadium	2:25	93	Boxscore
Sep 6, 2025	14:30	Italy	0–8	Cuba	7	Okinawa Cellular Stadium	2:10	250	Boxscore
Sep 6, 2025	18:30	South Korea	2–4	Japan	7	Okinawa Cellular Stadium	2:11	5,067	Boxscore
Sep 7, 2025	10:30	Puerto Rico	6–2	Italy	7	Okinawa Cellular Stadium	2:35	473	Boxscore
Sep 7, 2025	14:00	Japan	3–0	Cuba	7	Okinawa Cellular Stadium	2:07	6,055	Boxscore
Sep 8, 2025	10:30	Cuba	0–1	Puerto Rico	7	Nishizaki Stadium	2:01	184	Boxscore
Sep 8, 2025	18:30	South Africa	0–10	Japan	F/5	Okinawa Cellular Stadium	1:32	2,905	Boxscore
Sep 8, 2025	18:30	Italy	0–8	South Korea	7	Nishizaki Stadium	1:54	227	Boxscore
Sep 9, 2025	14:30	Cuba	0–3	South Korea	7	Okinawa Cellular Stadium	1:48	378	Boxscore
Sep 9, 2025	14:30	South Africa	4–5	Italy	7	Nishizaki Stadium	2:03	130	Boxscore
Sep 9, 2025	18:30	Japan	3–0	Puerto Rico	7	Okinawa Cellular Stadium	2:08	3,556	Boxscore
Sep 10, 2025	10:00	South Korea	17–0	South Africa	F/5	Okinawa Cellular Stadium	1:41	38	Boxscore

=== Group B ===
Pos	Team	Pld	W	L	RF	RA	PCT	GB	Qualification
1	United States	5	5	0	43	4	1.000	—	Advance to super round
2	Chinese Taipei	5	4	1	27	11	.800	1	Advance to super round
3	Panama	5	2	3	28	20	.400 (Note: Three-way tie decided by TQB)	3	Advance to super round
4	Australia	5	2	3	26	30	.400	3	Advance to placement round
5	Germany	5	2	3	21	38	.400	3	Advance to placement round
6	China	5	0	5	11	53	.000	5	Advance to placement round

Source: WBSC
Notes:

Date	Local time	Road team	Score	Home team	Inn.	Venue	Game duration	Attendance	Boxscore
Sep 5, 2025	10:30	United States	9–0	Panama	7	Okinawa Cellular Stadium	2:30	76	Boxscore
Sep 5, 2025	10:30	Germany	5–4	Australia	7	Nishizaki Stadium	2:23	100	Boxscore
Sep 5, 2025	18:30	China	0–7	Chinese Taipei	7	Nishizaki Stadium	2:13	275	Boxscore
Sep 6, 2025	10:30	Australia	4–1	Panama	7	Okinawa Cellular Stadium	2:17	200	Boxscore
Sep 6, 2025	14:30	Germany	9–3	China	7	Nishizaki Stadium	2:28	147	Boxscore
Sep 6, 2025	18:30	Chinese Taipei	0–4	United States	7	Nishizaki Stadium	2:10	657	Boxscore
Sep 7, 2025	10:30	China	3–15	Australia	F/5	Nishizaki Stadium	2:06	153	Boxscore
Sep 7, 2025	14:30	United States	9–3	Germany	7	Nishizaki Stadium	2:19	388	Boxscore
Sep 7, 2025	18:30	Panama	1–2	Chinese Taipei	7	Nishizaki Stadium	2:11	315	Boxscore
Sep 8, 2025	10:30	China	0–10	United States	F/5	Okinawa Cellular Stadium	1:34	200	Boxscore
Sep 8, 2025	14:30	Australia	2–10	Chinese Taipei	7	Okinawa Cellular Stadium	2:12	219	Boxscore
Sep 8, 2025	14:30	Germany	0–14	Panama	F/5	Nishizaki Stadium	1:50	78	Boxscore
Sep 9, 2025	10:30	Australia	1–11	United States	F/6	Okinawa Cellular Stadium	2:04	236	Boxscore
Sep 9, 2025	10:30	Panama	12–5	China	7	Nishizaki Stadium	2:33	54	Boxscore
Sep 9, 2025	18:30	Chinese Taipei	8–4	Germany	F/8	Nishizaki Stadium	2:18	253	Boxscore

== Super round ==
Pos	Team	Pld	W	L	RF	RA	PCT	GB	Qualification
1	Japan (H)	5	5	0	28	10	1.000	—	Advance to final
2	United States	5	4	1	23	6	.800	1	Advance to final
3	South Korea	5	3	2	24	8	.600	2	Advance to third-place game
4	Chinese Taipei	5	2	3	5	22	.400	3	Advance to third-place game
5	Puerto Rico	5	1	4	5	17	.200	4	
6	Panama	5	0	5	7	29	.000	5	

Source: WBSC
(H) Hosts

Date	Local time	Road team	Score	Home team	Inn.	Venue	Game duration	Attendance	Boxscore
Sep 11, 2025	10:30	Puerto Rico	3–1	Panama	7	Okinawa Cellular Stadium	2:23	85	Boxscore
Sep 11, 2025	18:30	Chinese Taipei	1–8	South Korea	7	Nishizaki Stadium	2:38	225	Boxscore
Sep 11, 2025	18:30	Japan	6–2	United States	F/8	Okinawa Cellular Stadium	2:40	5,286	Boxscore
Sep 12, 2025	14:30	Puerto Rico	0–1	Chinese Taipei	F/9	Okinawa Cellular Stadium	2:12	286	Boxscore
Sep 12, 2025	18:30	South Korea	0–1	United States	7	Nishizaki Stadium	1:43	277	Boxscore
Sep 12, 2025	18:30	Panama	5–6	Japan	F/9	Okinawa Cellular Stadium	2:35	2,489	Boxscore
Sep 13, 2025	14:30	Puerto Rico	0–7	United States	7	Okinawa Cellular Stadium	2:00	547	Boxscore
Sep 13, 2025	18:30	Panama	0–9	South Korea	7	Nishizaki Stadium	2:15	150	Boxscore
Sep 13, 2025	18:30	Chinese Taipei	1–9	Japan	7	Okinawa Cellular Stadium	2:02	4,531	Boxscore

== Placement round ==
Pos	Team	Pld	W	L	RF	RA	PCT	GB
1	Cuba	5	5	0	34	4	1.000	—
2	Australia	5	3	2	45	15	.600 (Note: Head-to-head result: Italy 3-12 Australia)	2
3	Italy	5	3	2	18	29	.600	2
4	Germany	5	2	3	23	21	.400	3
5	China	5	1	4	20	43	.200 (Note: Head-to-head result: South Africa 3-11 China)	4
6	South Africa	5	1	4	15	43	.200	4

Source: WBSC
Notes:

Date	Local time	Road team	Score	Home team	Inn.	Venue	Game duration	Attendance	Boxscore
Sep 11, 2025	10:30	China	11–3	South Africa	7	Nishizaki Stadium	2:11	45	Boxscore
Sep 11, 2025	14:30	Germany	2–4	Italy	7	Nishizaki Stadium	1:52	53	Boxscore
Sep 11, 2025	14:30	Australia	1–2	Cuba	F/9	Okinawa Cellular Stadium	2:31	196	Boxscore
Sep 12, 2025	10:30	China	3–6	Italy	7	Nishizaki Stadium	2:18	39	Boxscore
Sep 12, 2025	10:30	Germany	3–4	Cuba	7	Okinawa Cellular Stadium	2:07	39	Boxscore
Sep 12, 2025	14:30	South Africa	2–13	Australia	F/5	Nishizaki Stadium	1:38	55	Boxscore
Sep 13, 2025	10:30	South Africa	6–4	Germany	7	Nishizaki Stadium	2:10	78	Boxscore
Sep 13, 2025	10:30	Italy	3–12	Australia	7	Okinawa Cellular Stadium	2:18	69	Boxscore
Sep 13, 2025	14:30	China	0–10	Cuba	F/6	Nishizaki Stadium	1:59	38	Boxscore

== Finals ==
=== Third-place game ===
Date	Local time	Road team	Score	Home team	Inn.	Venue	Game duration	Attendance	Boxscore
Sep 14, 2025	11:00	Chinese Taipei	3–2	South Korea	7	Okinawa Cellular Stadium	2:25	1,516	Boxscore

=== Championship ===
Date	Local time	Road team	Score	Home team	Inn.	Venue	Game duration	Attendance	Boxscore
Sep 14, 2025	16:00	United States	2–0	Japan	7	Okinawa Cellular Stadium	1:47	16,693	Boxscore

== Final standings ==
Rk	Team	W	L
1st place, gold medalist(s)	United States	8	1
Lost in final
2nd place, silver medalist(s)	Japan	8	1
Failed to qualify for the final
3rd place, bronze medalist(s)	Chinese Taipei	6	3
Lost in 3rd place game
4	South Korea	6	3
Failed to qualify for the finals
5	Puerto Rico	4	4
6	Panama	2	6
Failed to qualify for the super round
7	Cuba	5	3
8	Australia	4	4
9	Italy	3	5
10	Germany	2	6
11	China	1	7
12	South Africa	1	7

== U-18 All-World Team ==
Position	Player
C	(United States) William Brick
1B	(Chinese Taipei) Sheng-En Zeng
2B	(Japan) Ryota Okumura
3B	(United States) Grady Emerson
SS	(United States) Aiden Ruiz
OF	(South Korea) Jiho Park
OF	(Panama) Luis Rivera
OF	(Chinese Taipei) Kai-Qi Li
DH	(Panama) Carlos Castillo
P	(United States) Giovanni Rojas

== Statistical leaders ==
=== Batting ===
Statistic	Name	Total/Avg
Batting average*	(Australia) Ashton Kennedy	.444
Hits	(United States) Aiden Ruiz	11
Runs	(Cuba) Jonathan Moreno	9
Runs	(South Korea) Ji-seok Kim	9
Doubles	4 tied with	3
Triples	(Germany) Alessandro Carrasquilla	2
Triples	(South Korea) Jae-won Oh	2
Triples	(China) Xin Zhao	2
Home runs	5 tied with	1
Runs batted in	(Australia) Josh Nati	12
Walks	(Puerto Rico) Juan Pacheco	10
Stolen bases	(Japan) Hyuma Okabe	7
On-base percentage*	(Chinese Taipei) Ting-Yi Jiang	.565
Slugging percentage*	(United States) Will Brick	.667
OPS*	(Australia) Lachlan Vella	1.063

* Minimum 2.1 plate appearances per team game

=== Pitching ===
Statistic	Name	Total/Avg
Wins	(Japan) Daito Nakano	3
Saves	(Japan) Genki Ishigaki	2
Saves	(Puerto Rico) Yandiel Reyes	2
Innings pitched	(Cuba) Edenis Cruz	16
Earned run average*	9 tied	0.00
Strikeouts	(South Korea) Joel Kim	19
Strikeouts	(Japan) Shōta Morishita	19
Walks allowed*	(Chinese Taipei) Shin-Chan Chen	0
Walks allowed*	(Japan) Shōta Morishita	0
Walks allowed*	(Australia) Damien Wilson	0
BAA*	(United States) Carson Bolemon	.057

* Minimum 1 innings pitched per team game
