= U-18 Asian Baseball Championship =

International baseball tournament

- Sport: Baseball
- No. of teams: 8 (2024)
- Continent: Asia
- Most recent champions: South Korea (2026) (6th title)
- Most titles: South Korea (6 titles)

The U-18 Asian Baseball Championship is an under-18 international baseball tournament sanctioned and created by the Baseball Federation of Asia (BFA). The tournament is prior to the 18U Baseball World Cup which is held every other year.

== Results ==
Year	Host country	Host city	Final			Semifinalists	
Year	Host country	Host city	Champions	Score	Runners-up	3rd place	4th place
1994; Details	Australia	Brisbane	Japan	1–0	Australia	Chinese Taipei	China
1996; Details	Philippines	Manila	South Korea	12–3	Chinese Taipei	Japan	China
1998; Details	Japan	Osaka	Japan	12–3	Chinese Taipei	South Korea	China
2001; Details	Taiwan	Taipei	Chinese Taipei	12–3	Japan	South Korea	Australia
2003; Details	Thailand	Bangkok	South Korea	12–3	Chinese Taipei	Japan	China
2005; Details	South Korea	Incheon	Japan	5–4	South Korea	Chinese Taipei	China
2007; Details	Taiwan	Taichung	Chinese Taipei	1–0	South Korea	Japan	Thailand
2009; Details	South Korea	Seoul	South Korea	9–2	Chinese Taipei	Japan	China
2011; Details	Japan	Yokohama	Japan	6–1	South Korea	Chinese Taipei	Philippines
2014; Details	Thailand	Bangkok	South Korea	2–1	Japan	Chinese Taipei	Philippines
2016; Details	Taiwan	Taichung	Japan	1–0	Chinese Taipei	South Korea	China
2018; Details	Japan	Miyazaki	South Korea	7–5	Chinese Taipei	Japan	China
2024; Details^{1}	Taiwan	Taipei, New Taipei, Taoyuan	Chinese Taipei	6–1	Japan	South Korea	Philippines
2026; Details	Taiwan	Taipei	South Korea	2–0	Japan	Chinese Taipei	Philippines

^{1}The tournament was supposed to take place in 2020, however, due to the COVID-19 pandemic, the competition has been cancelled.

== Medal table ==
Rank	Nation	Gold	Silver	Bronze	Total
1	South Korea	6	3	4	13
2	Japan	5	4	5	14
3	Chinese Taipei	3	6	5	14
4	Australia	0	1	0	1
Totals (4 entries)		14	14	14	42

== U15 ==
(ja:U-15アジア野球選手権大会)

=== Medals (2000-2025) ===
Rank	Nation	Gold	Silver	Bronze	Total
1	Chinese Taipei	8	4	0	12
2	Japan	3	6	4	13
3	South Korea	1	2	8	11
Totals (3 entries)		12	12	12	36

== U12 ==
(ja:12Uアジア野球選手権大会)

=== Medals (2000-2024) ===
Rank	Nation	Gold	Silver	Bronze	Total
1	Chinese Taipei	8	1	2	11
2	Japan	1	6	3	10
3	South Korea	1	3	4	8
4	China	1	0	2	3
5	Hong Kong	0	1	0	1
Totals (5 entries)		11	11	11	33

== Club - Asian City Baseball Tournament ==
(ja:アジア都市対抗野球大会)

Only 3 editions in 2004, 2005 and 2007.

== See also ==
- U-18 Baseball World Cup
- Asian Baseball Championship
