= VIII Baseball World Junior Championship 1988 =

The VIII Baseball World Junior Championship 1988 was a competition for baseballers below the age of 19. It took place in December 1988 in the eastern Australian metropolis Sydney. Venues were Oriole Park in the western suburb of Auburn and the Flat Rock baseball diamond in the northern suburb of Willoughby. Among eight participants, the United States of America won the title ahead of Cuba and Chinese Taipei.

== Medalists ==
Event	Gold	Silver	Bronze
Tournament	United States; Doug Bennett; Greg Blosser; Reid Cornelius; Darin Dreasky; Brent Gates; Tyler Green; Dean Haskins; Charles Johnson; Kiki Jones; Mickey Kerns; Ryan Klesko; Bub Maietta; Rusty Rugg; Chris Sinacori; Steve Solomon; Scott Stahoviak; Troy Tallman; Pat True	Cuba	Chinese Taipei

== Final standings ==
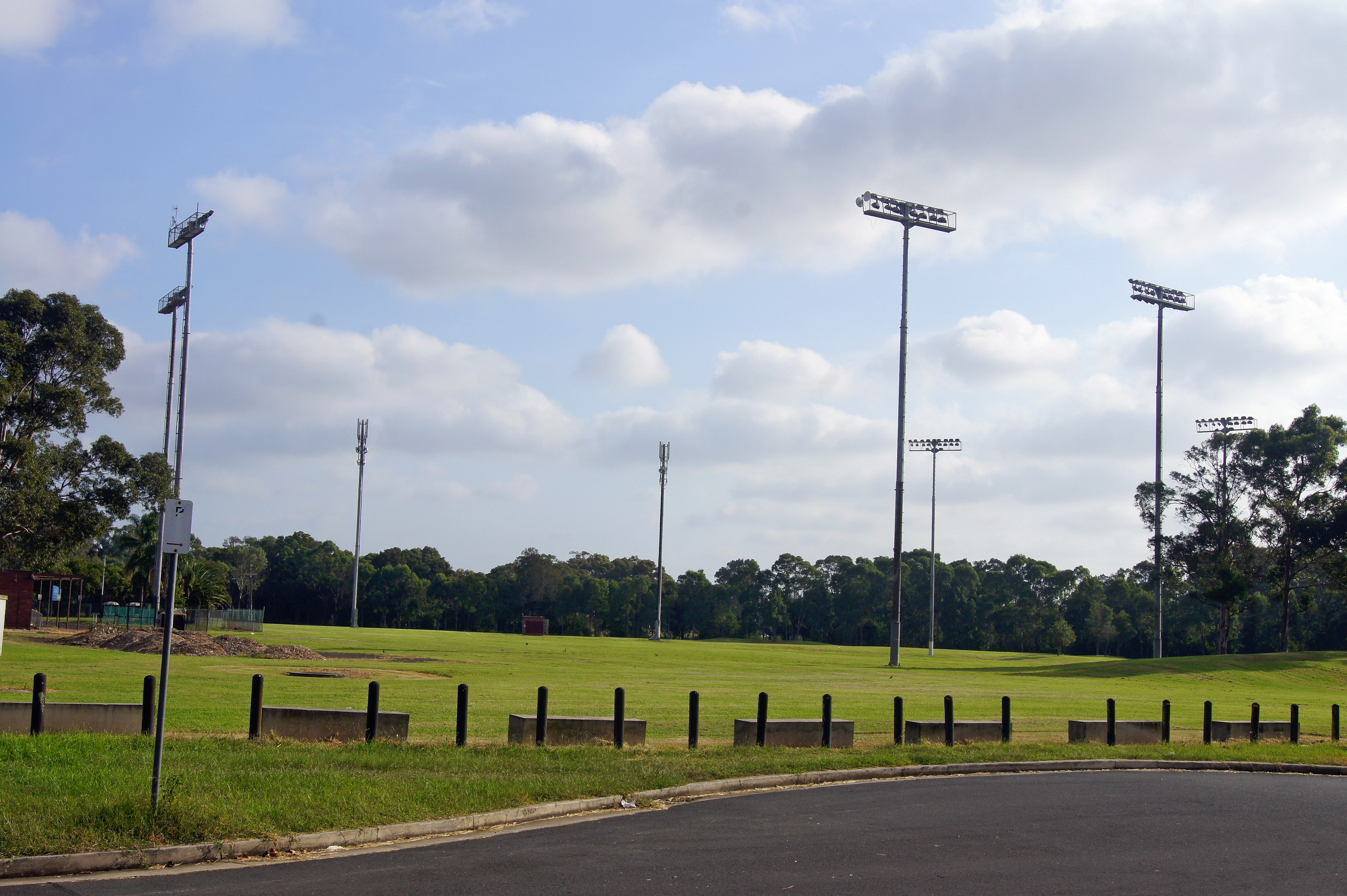
The floodlight masts is all what remains of the Oriole Park stadium

Rk	Team
1st place, gold medalist(s)	United States
Lost in Final
2nd place, silver medalist(s)	Cuba
Failed to qualify for the Final
3rd place, bronze medalist(s)	Chinese Taipei
Lost in 3rd Place Game
4	Australia
Failed to qualify for the semifinals
5	Canada
6	South Korea
7	Italy
8	China
