= Reid Cornelius =

American baseball player & coach (born 1970)

- Pitcher / Coach
- Born: June 2, 1970 (age 56); Thomasville, Alabama, U.S.
- Batted: Right Threw: Right

MLB debut
- April 29, 1995, for the Montreal Expos

Last MLB appearance
- September 30, 2000, for the Florida Marlins

MLB statistics
- Win–loss record: 8–17
- Earned run average: 4.91
- Strikeouts: 101
- Stats at Baseball Reference

Teams
- As player: Montreal Expos (1995); New York Mets (1995); Florida Marlins (1999–2000); As coach: Miami Marlins (2010–2016); Colorado Rockies (2022–2024)
Medals
Men's baseball
Representing United States
World Junior Baseball Championship
Gold medal – first place	1988 Sydney	Team

Jonathan Reid Cornelius (born June 2, 1970) is an American former professional baseball pitcher. He played in Major League Baseball (MLB) for the Montreal Expos, New York Mets, and Florida Marlins.

== Career ==
Cornelius was born in Thomasville, Alabama to Ted, a school principal, and Ila Cornelius, a teacher's aide. His older brother, Pat, played college baseball at Auburn. He maintained a 97.6 grade average at Thomasville High School. He planned to play college baseball at Mississippi State but chose instead to begin a professional career after being taken in the eleventh round of the 1988 Major League Baseball draft by the Montreal Expos and receiving a signing bonus of $225,000 (equivalent to $613,000 in 2025). According to his father, it was the largest contract ever given to a high school draftee. He began his professional career with the Rockford Expos of the Midwest League.

Cornelius was the Miami Marlins' bullpen coach from 2010 to 2016. He was named the pitching coach for the Atlanta Braves' Triple–A affiliate, the Gwinnett Braves, prior to the 2017 season.

Cornelius was named as the pitching coach for the Jupiter Hammerheads of the Miami Marlins organization for the 2019 season.

Cornelius was named the bullpen coach for the Colorado Rockies on December 13, 2021. On October 8, 2024, Cornelius and the Rockies parted ways.

In 2025, Cornelius was named pitching coach for the Louisville Bats the Triple-A affiliate of the Cincinnati Reds.

Preceded by Steve Foster	Miami Marlins bullpen coach 2010–2016	Succeeded by Dean Treanor
