= Greg Blosser =

American baseball player (born 1971)

- Outfielder
- Born: June 26, 1971 (age 55); Manatee County, Florida, U.S.
- Batted: Left Threw: Left

Professional debut
- MLB: September 5, 1993, for the Boston Red Sox
- NPB: April 3, 1999, for the Seibu Lions

Last appearance
- MLB: April 17, 1994, for the Boston Red Sox
- NPB: June 22, 1999, for the Seibu Lions

MLB statistics
- Batting average: .077
- Home runs: 0
- Runs batted in: 2

NPB statistics
- Batting average: .198
- Home runs: 3
- Runs batted in: 9
- Stats at Baseball Reference

Teams
- Boston Red Sox (1993–1994); Seibu Lions (1999)
Medals
Men's baseball
Representing United States
World Junior Baseball Championship
Gold medal – first place	1988 Sydney	Team

Gregory Brent Blosser (born June 26, 1971) is a former outfielder in Major League Baseball (MLB) who briefly played for the Boston Red Sox during the 1993 and 1994 seasons as part of a 15-year career in professional baseball.

== Biography ==
Born in Manatee County, Florida, Blosser attended Sarasota High School. In 2026 he was inducted into its hall of fame. Blosser was taken by Boston with their first-round pick in the 1989 Major League Baseball draft out of Sarasota High School. His brief trial with the 1993–1994 Red Sox came after he slugged 23 homers for Triple–A Pawtucket in 1992. In his 22-game MLB career, he collected two singles and a double and six bases on balls in 45 plate appearances, hitting .077 and collecting two runs batted in.

Following his minor league career, Blosser played in 34 games for Japan's Seibu Lions in 1999. He later appeared in 208 games for two clubs in the independent Atlantic League. He retired from pro baseball in 2008 with 202 career home runs — 155 in the minors, 44 in the independent leagues, and three in Japan.

Blosser batted and threw left-handed, stood 6 feet 3 inches (1.91 m) tall and weighed 200 pounds (91 kg).

In 2000 he and his father started a private detective agency. He has many investments in real estate in both Florida and Japan.
