= Brent Gates =

American baseball player (born 1970)

- Second baseman / Third baseman
- Born: March 14, 1970 (age 56); Grand Rapids, Michigan, U.S.
- Batted: Switch Threw: Right

MLB debut
- May 5, 1993, for the Oakland Athletics

Last MLB appearance
- October 3, 1999, for the Minnesota Twins

MLB statistics
- Batting average: .264
- Home runs: 25
- Runs batted in: 279
- Stats at Baseball Reference

Teams
- Oakland Athletics (1993–1996); Seattle Mariners (1997); Minnesota Twins (1998–1999)
Medals
Men's baseball
Representing United States
World Junior Baseball Championship
Gold medal – first place	1988 Sydney	Team
Goodwill Games
Bronze medal – third place	1990 Seattle	Team

Brent Robert Gates (born March 14, 1970) is an American former professional baseball second and third baseman. He played in Major League Baseball (MLB) for the Oakland Athletics, Seattle Mariners, and Minnesota Twins from 1993 to 1999. Prior to playing professionally, Gates played for the University of Minnesota where he was named the Big Ten Conference Baseball Player of the Year.

== Playing career ==
=== Amateur career ===
Gates attended Grandville High School in Grandville, Michigan, and the University of Minnesota, where he played for the Minnesota Golden Gophers baseball team. In 1991, Gates was named the Big Ten Conference Baseball Player of the Year and was a member of the College Baseball All-America Team. After the 1991 season, he played collegiate summer baseball with the Hyannis Mets of the Cape Cod Baseball League.

Gates played for the United States national under-18 team at the 1988 World Junior Baseball Championship. He hit .333 in seven games for the U.S. He played for the U.S. collegiate national team in 1990, including at the Goodwill Games, where the U.S. finished third, and Baseball World Cup, finishing seventh. In 31 games that summer, Gates hit .373.

=== Professional career ===
The Oakland Athletics drafted Gates in the first round of the 1991 Major League Baseball draft. He made his major league debut with Oakland on May 5, 1993. He finished sixth in American League (AL) Rookie of the Year voting after batting .290 with 7 home runs. He hit a foul ball off his left shin in June 1996, fracturing his tibia and ending his season. Oakland released him in March 1997, and he signed with the Seattle Mariners. He hit .238 in a backup role and made his only postseason appearance, batting 0-for-4 in two AL Division Series games. Gates then signed as a one-year contract with the Minnesota Twins and re-signed with the Twins ahead of the 1999 season. He played in his final game on October 3. In two years with Minnesota, he hit .252 with 6 home runs in 217 games.

== Coaching and scouting career ==
Gates was head coach of the Grand Rapids Christian High School baseball team, leading them to three state championships and was a coach for the Class-A West Michigan Whitecaps during the 2001 season. He was the varsity baseball coach at Byron Center High School in Byron Center, Michigan, through the 2018 season. Gates is based in Grand Rapids and has worked as a professional scout for the Tampa Bay Rays.

== Personal life ==
Gates and his wife reside in Grand Rapids, Michigan. His wife, Tiffanie, played college volleyball at Arizona State University. They has five children. Their son, Brent Jr., played hockey at the University of Minnesota before playing professionally after being drafted by the Anaheim Ducks in the third round in 2015. His daughters played college volleyball together at Grand Valley State.
