= Robert Hassell III =

American baseball player (born 2001)

Free agent
- Outfielder
- Born: August 15, 2001 (age 25); Franklin, Tennessee, U.S.
- Bats: Left Throws: Left

MLB debut
- May 22, 2025, for the Washington Nationals

MLB statistics (through 2025 season)
- Batting average: .223
- Home runs: 3
- Runs batted in: 18
- Stats at Baseball Reference

Teams
- Washington Nationals (2025)
Medals
Men's baseball
Representing United States
U-18 Baseball World Cup
| Silver medal – second place | 2019 Gijang | Team |

Robert Harris Hassell III (born August 15, 2001) is an American professional baseball outfielder who is a free agent. He was selected eighth overall by the San Diego Padres in the 2020 MLB draft. He was traded to the Washington Nationals in 2022 and made his Major League Baseball (MLB) debut in 2025.

== Amateur career ==
Hassell grew up in Franklin, Tennessee, and attended Independence High School, where he was both an outfielder and a starting pitcher on the baseball team. He competed in the Little League World Series in 2013 and 2014 on a team representing Nashville, Tennessee. Recognized as a top collegiate prospect entering high school, Hassell committed to play college baseball at the University of Tennessee in October of his freshman year.

In his freshman season, Hassell hit .407 with 48 hits, 15 doubles, 2 home runs and 29 RBIs with 10 stolen bases and 24 runs scored and was named the Williamson County baseball player of the year. Following the season, he changed his commitment to Vanderbilt University. Hassell was named the Williamson County baseball player of the year again, as well as first team all-State by USA Today and an Underclass All-American by MaxPreps as a sophomore after batting .416 with nine doubles, six home runs and 52 RBIs. As a junior, Hassell was named the Tennessee Gatorade Player of the Year after batting .423 with 14 home runs, eight doubles, 36 RBIs and 22 stolen bases while also posting a 5-2 record with a 1.07 ERA and 113 strikeouts to 21 walks in 59 innings pitched. After the season, Hassell was named to the roster for the United States national baseball team to compete in the 2019 World Baseball Softball Confederation U-18 Baseball World Cup and won the Richard W. "Dick" Case Award as the team's most valuable player after leading the team in 10 different offensive categories. Hassell was named the WBSC International Player of the Year in December 2019. Hassell entered his senior season as one of the top high school prospects for the upcoming MLB draft and was named a preseason All-American by Baseball America.

== Professional career ==
=== San Diego Padres ===
Hassell was selected eighth overall in the 2020 Major League Baseball draft by the San Diego Padres. Hassell signed with the Padres on June 23, 2020, for a $4.3 million bonus. After signing, he was assigned to the Padres' alternate training site as the minor-league season was canceled due to the COVID-19 pandemic.

Hassell was named to the Padres' 2021 spring training roster as a non-roster invitee. He was assigned to the Lake Elsinore Storm of the Low-A West to start the 2021 minor-league season. He was promoted to the Fort Wayne TinCaps of the High-A Central in August. On September 1, in a game versus the Great Lakes Loons, Hassell hit three home runs. Over 110 games between the two teams, he slashed .302/.393/.470 with 11 home runs, 76 RBIs, 33 doubles, and 34 stolen bases. Hassell was assigned to Fort Wayne to begin the 2022 season. He was chosen to represent the Padres at the 2022 All-Star Futures Game.

=== Washington Nationals ===
On August 2, 2022, Hassell, along with CJ Abrams, Luke Voit, MacKenzie Gore, James Wood, and Jarlín Susana were traded to the Washington Nationals in exchange for Juan Soto and Josh Bell. The Nationals assigned him to the Wilmington Blue Rocks of the High-A South Atlantic League. Hassell played in 10 games for Wilmington before being promoted to the Harrisburg Senators of the Double-A Eastern League.

Hassell split the 2024 campaign between Wilmington, Harrisburg, and the Triple–A Rochester Red Wings, slashing a cumulative .241/.319/.328 with five home runs, 28 RBI, and 15 stolen bases over 85 games. On November 19, 2024, the Nationals added Hassell to their 40-man roster to protect him from the Rule 5 draft.

Hassell was optioned to Triple-A Rochester to begin the 2025 season. In 43 appearances for the Red Wings, he hit .288 with four home runs, 24 RBI, and nine stolen bases. On May 20, 2025, Hassell was promoted to the major leagues for the first time. He made his MLB debut on May 22, in a game against the Atlanta Braves. Hassell hit the first pitch thrown to him to right field for a single. He went on to go 2-for-5, with one stolen base, and two runs scored, including the winning run in an 8-7 Nationals walk-off win in the 10th inning. Six days later, Hassell hit his first major league home run off of Blas Castaño of the Seattle Mariners.

Hassell was optioned to Triple-A Rochester to begin the 2026 season. In 63 appearances for the Red Wings, he batted .215/.304/.289 with two home runs, 21 RBI, and eight stolen bases. On July 5, 2026, Hassell was designated for assignment by the Nationals. He cleared waivers after no other team chose to select him and returned to Rochester via outright assignment on July 12.

=== Pittsburgh Pirates ===
On July 16, 2026, Hassell was traded to the Pittsburgh Pirates in exchange for cash or a player to be named later; he was subsequently assigned to their Florida Complex League affiliate. He elected free agency on November 2.

== See also ==
- All-Star Futures Game all-time roster
