= Jacob Lombard =

American baseball player (born 2007)

Miami Marlins
- Shortstop
- Born: September 27, 2007 (age 18); Pinecrest, Florida, U.S.
- Bats: Right Throws: Right
- Stats at Baseball Reference
Medals
Men's baseball
Representing United States
U-18 Baseball World Cup
Gold medal – first place	2025 Naha-Itoman	Team

Jacob Lombard (born September 27, 2007) is an American professional baseball shortstop in the Miami Marlins organization.

== Early life ==
Lombard is the son of former Major League Baseball (MLB) player George Lombard, as well as the brother of first-round MLB draft pick George Lombard Jr. Growing up, he competed in several sports including baseball, soccer, football and gymnastics. His favorite sport was soccer, but he said he began to focus more on baseball after seeing his brother get recruited. Lombard and his brother George Jr. attended Gulliver Preparatory School in Pinecrest, Florida, where they played baseball and soccer. Lombard helped the soccer team to state championship victories in 2023 and 2024. In baseball, he was second-team Class 5A-2A All-Dade as a sophomore after batting .328. He then batted .306 with four home runs during the 2025 season as a junior.

Lombard played for the United States national under-18 baseball team at the 2025 U-18 Baseball World Cup, helping them win the championship over Japan by a score of 2–0. In October 2025, he committed to play college baseball for the Miami Hurricanes.

== Career ==
Lombard was considered a top prospect for the 2026 Major League Baseball draft. The Miami Marlins selected him in the first round, with the 14th overall selection. On July 16, Lombard signed with the Marlins for a $5 million signing bonus deal. On August 4, Lombard made his professional debut with the Single-A Jupiter Hammerheads and hit a home run in the same game. He made his debut on the same day as the Major League debut of his brother, George Jr., with both brothers hitting a home run in their second at bat.
