= Pete Crow-Armstrong =

American baseball player (born 2002)

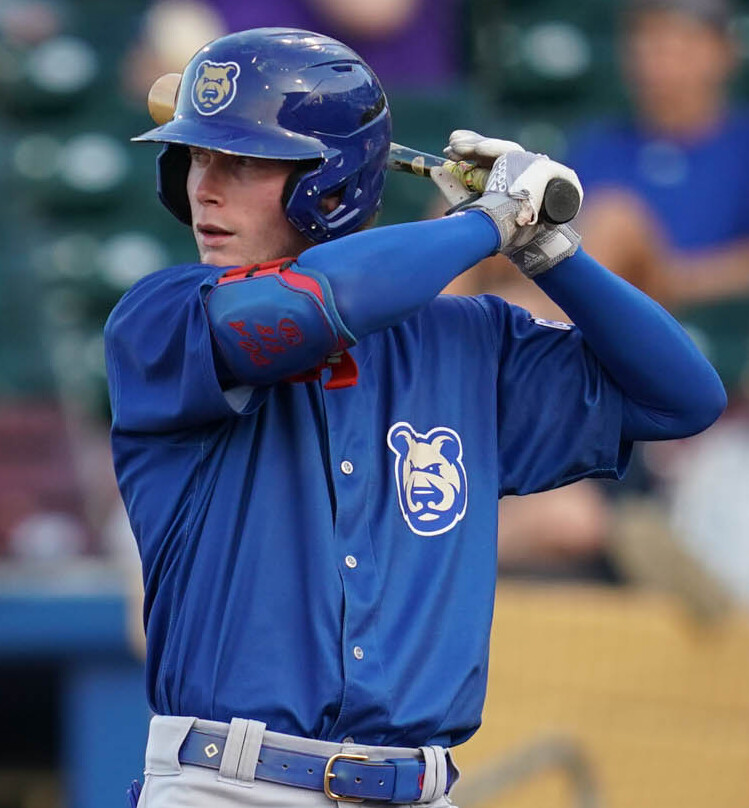
- Crow-Armstrong with the Iowa Cubs in 2023

Chicago Cubs – No. 4
- Center fielder
- Born: March 25, 2002 (age 24); Sherman Oaks, California, U.S.
- Bats: Left Throws: Left

MLB debut
- September 11, 2023, for the Chicago Cubs

MLB statistics (through 2026 season)
- Batting average: .255
- Home runs: 86
- Runs batted in: 250
- Stolen bases: 105
- Stats at Baseball Reference

Teams
- Chicago Cubs (2023–present)

Career highlights and awards
- 2× All-Star (2025, 2026); NL MVP (2026); All-MLB First Team (2026); 2× Gold Glove Award (2025, 2026); Silver Slugger Award (2026); NL Hank Aaron Award (2026); NL home run leader (2026) (Note: Tied with Kyle Schwarber)
Medals
Men's baseball
Representing United States
World Baseball Classic
Silver medal – second place	2026 Miami	Team
U-18 Baseball World Cup
Silver medal – second place	2019 Gijang	Team

Pete Henry Crow-Armstrong (born March 25, 2002), also commonly known by his initials "PCA", is an American professional baseball center fielder for the Chicago Cubs of Major League Baseball (MLB). He made his MLB debut in 2023.

Crow-Armstrong was drafted by the New York Mets with the 19th overall pick of the 2020 MLB draft. During the 2021 trade deadline, he was traded to the Cubs for Javier Báez and Trevor Williams. In 2025, he was named to his first All-Star Game and won the Gold Glove Award. In 2026, he was named to the All-Star Game for the second consecutive time and won the Platinum Glove Award along with the Hank Aaron Award and the Silver Slugger Award and unanimously winning the National League's Most Valuable Player.

== Amateur career ==
Crow-Armstrong attended Harvard-Westlake School in Los Angeles, California, where he played baseball. In 2019, his junior year, he was named the Los Angeles Times Player of the Year after hitting .395 with three home runs, 23 runs batted in (RBIs), and 47 hits over 34 games, striking out only seven times. That summer, he played in the 2019 Under Armour All-America Baseball Game. In 2020, his senior year, he was batting .514 before the baseball season was cut short due to the COVID-19 pandemic. He committed to play college baseball at Vanderbilt University before the 2020 MLB draft.

== Professional career ==
=== New York Mets ===
Crow-Armstrong was considered one of the top prospects for the 2020 Major League Baseball draft. The New York Mets selected him in the first round with the 19th overall selection. He signed with the Mets on June 25 for a bonus of $3.4 million. He did not play a minor league game in 2020 due to the cancellation of the minor league season caused by the pandemic.

Crow-Armstrong began the 2021 season with the St. Lucie Mets of the Low-A Southeast League. On May 18, it was announced that Crow-Armstrong would undergo surgery on his right shoulder for a glenoid labral articular disruption, ending his season. He hit .417 with four RBIs and two stolen bases in 24 at bats prior to the injury.

=== Chicago Cubs ===
==== Minor leagues ====
On July 30, 2021, the Mets traded Crow-Armstrong to the Chicago Cubs for Javier Báez and Trevor Williams. On September 16, 2024, Crow-Armstrong revealed his feelings about the trade, saying, "I didn’t feel like I was a part of any trade talks that I had seen on TV or anything like that." He continued, "I had a sling on my shoulder... I thought it was a joke."

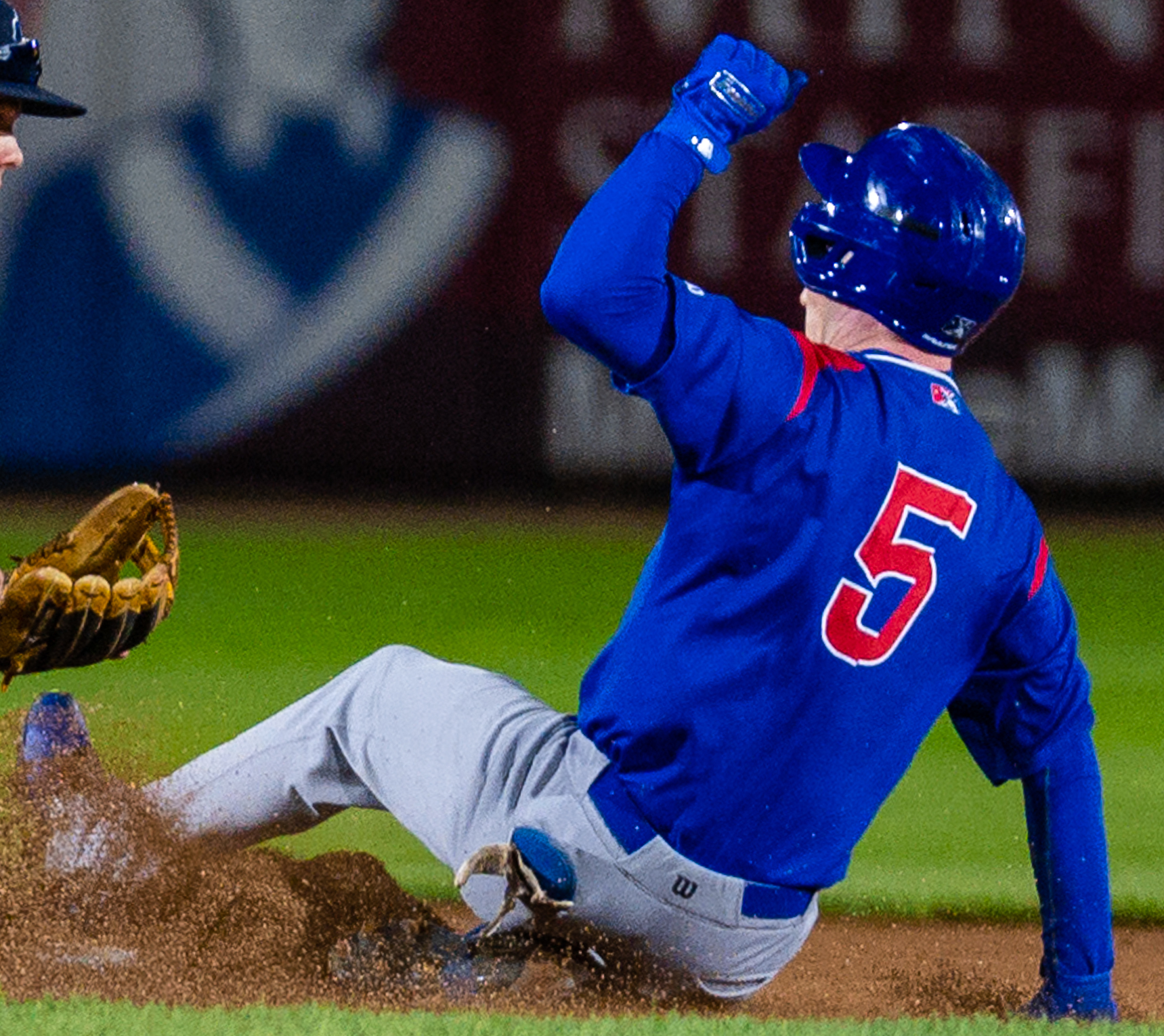
Crow-Armstrong sliding into second base for the South Bend Cubs

Crow-Armstrong began the 2022 season with the Myrtle Beach Pelicans of the Low-A Carolina League and was promoted to the South Bend Cubs of the High-A Midwest League in late May. He was selected to represent the Cubs at the All-Star Futures Game. He was named a MiLB Gold Glove as one of the three best defensive outfielders in the minor leagues. Crow-Armstrong and South Bend won the Midwest League championship.

==== 2023: MLB debut ====
On February 6, 2023, Crow-Armstrong was one of the 32 non-roster players invited to the Cubs' spring training camp. He opened the 2023 season with Tennessee Smokies of the Double-A Southern League, beginning the season as the Cubs' number one prospect and the sixth-ranked outfielder prospect in MLB. He was selected to represent the Cubs at the All-Star Futures Game.

In 73 games in Double-A, Crow-Armstrong batted .289/.371/.527 with 14 home runs, 60 RBI, and 27 steals. On July 31, Crow-Armstrong was promoted to the Triple-A Iowa Cubs. In 34 games for Iowa, he averaged .271/.350/.479 with six home runs, two triples, seven doubles, 30 runs, 38 hits, and 22 RBIs.

On September 11, 2023, after recording a combined .876 OPS in the minors, the Cubs called up Crow-Armstrong to the major leagues for the first time. That day, he made his MLB debut against the Colorado Rockies, entering the game in the seventh inning as a pinch runner but was caught stealing third base. In the ninth inning, he made his first career plate appearance, hitting a sacrifice bunt. Crow-Armstrong made his first MLB start on September 12 in center field. He went 0-for-4 with an RBI fielder's choice and made two highlight-reel plays in the outfield. In 13 games in September, Crow-Armstrong batted 0-for-14 with 3 walks and two stolen bases, coming in as a pinch runner seven times.

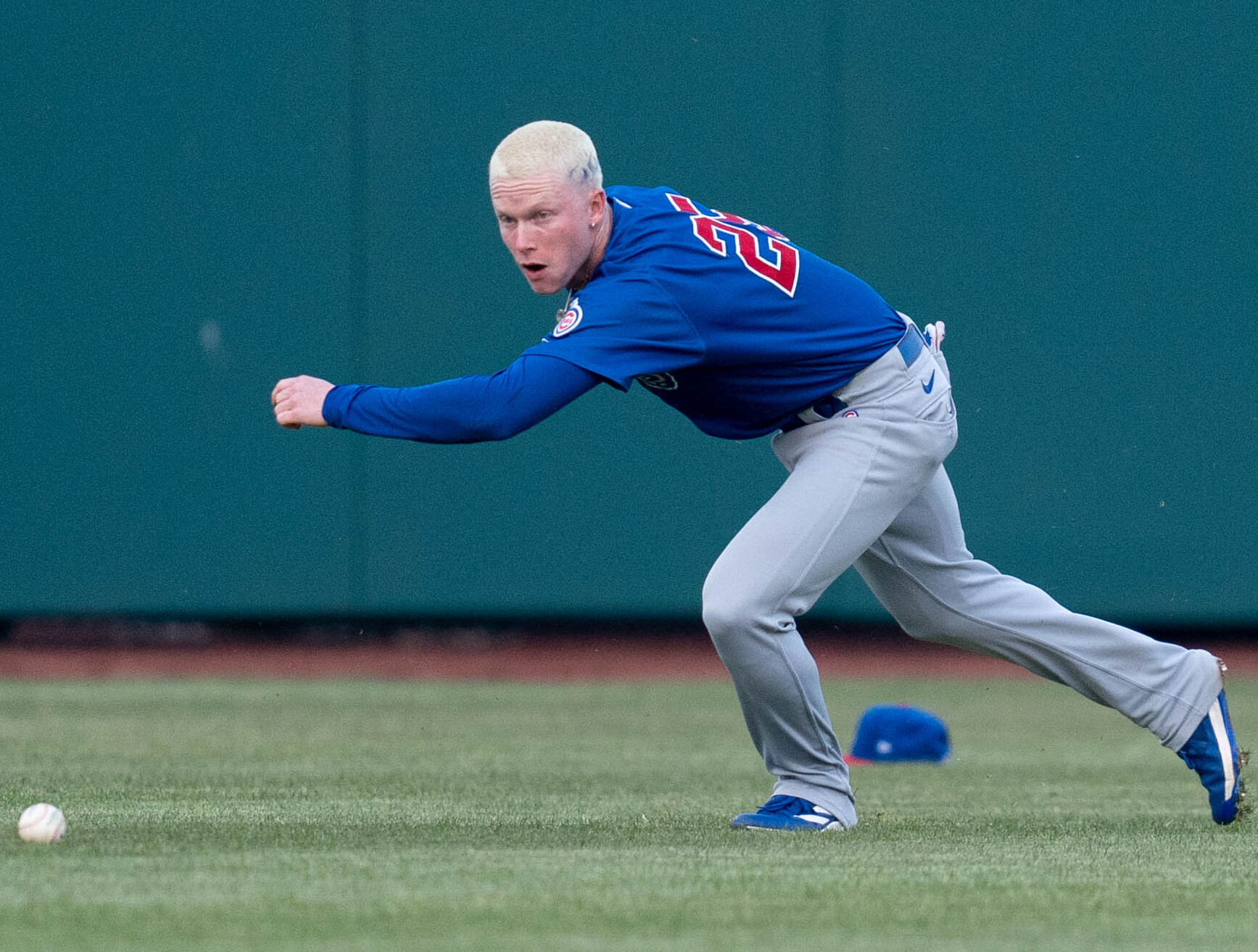
Crow-Armstrong with the Iowa Cubs in 2024

==== 2024: Rookie season ====
Crow-Armstrong was optioned to Triple-A Iowa Cubs to begin the 2024 season after batting .138/.194/.435 with four hits and three stolen bases in spring training. He was recalled to the majors on April 24, after an injury to Cody Bellinger. In the sixth inning of the following game, Crow-Armstrong collected his first career hit, a go-ahead two-run home run off of Bryan Abreu of the Houston Astros. Crow-Armstrong hit an inside-the-park home run on August 23 off Max Meyer of the Miami Marlins. It was noted as being the fastest time to home plate from a base hit since 2017 at 14.08 seconds, with a peak sprint speed of 30.4 ft/s (20.7 mph).

In 123 games for the Cubs, he averaged .237/.286/.384 with 10 home runs, 27 stolen bases, six triples, 13 doubles, 46 runs, and 47 RBIs. He was the second-best defensive outfielder, tied for the third-fastest baserunner, and the ninth most valuable baserunner according to Statcast.

==== 2025: First All-Star selection and 30–30 season ====
Crow-Armstrong was the Cubs' Opening Day center fielder in 2025, as the team began the season in Japan. On May 23, Crow-Armstrong hit a go-ahead grand slam home run in a six-run seventh inning, leading Chicago to a 13–6 road victory over the Cincinnati Reds. It was Crow-Armstrong's first career grand slam. He became the first Cubs player with two six-RBI games in a calendar month since RBIs became official in 1920. On June 3, Crow-Armstrong, who led off the fourth inning of the Cubs’ series opener versus the Washington Nationals with a double, stole third base before coming home to score. With the steal, his 20th of the season, Crow-Armstrong became the fourth-fastest major leaguer in the modern era (since 1900) to record 15 home runs and 20 stolen bases in a season, reaching the milestone in 60 games. On June 19, Crow-Armstrong hit a go-ahead two-run home run in the first inning, becoming the first player to 20 home runs and 20 stolen bases in the 2025 season. Crow-Armstrong was one of six players to receive more than 3 million votes to start in the All-Star Game, being named the National League's starting center fielder on July 2. With two home runs on July 10, Crow-Armstrong became the fourth fastest player in major league history with at least 25 home runs and 25 stolen bases in a season, trailing Eric Davis in 1987 (69 games), and Alfonso Soriano in 2002 and Bobby Bonds in 1973 (both 91 games). Crow-Armstrong took 92 games to reach this milestone.

At the All-Star break, Crow-Armstrong was hitting .265/.302/.544 with 25 home runs, 27 stolen bases, 4 triples, 21 doubles, 67 runs, 99 hits, and 71 RBIs. However, Armstrong slumped in August, batting .160 with one home run and two steals in 28 games. On September 26, Crow-Armstrong joined the 30–30 club with a two-run home run off Cardinals pitcher Miles Mikolas in the fourth inning. He became the second player in Cubs history to record a 30–30 season, joining Sammy Sosa. He finished the season batting .247/.287/.481 with 37 doubles, 31 home runs, 95 RBIs, 35 stolen bases, and an MLB-leading 12 sacrifice flies.

The Cubs made the playoffs as the No. 4 seed, gaining home-field advantage during the 2025 National League Wild Card Series against the San Diego Padres. In the 2025 postseason, Crow-Armstrong had a batting average of .185 with three RBIs and a stolen base. On November 2, 2025, Crow-Armstrong was awarded his first career Gold Glove Award for National League center fielders.

==== 2026: MVP, 40-40 season, Platinum Glove, & Hank Aaron Award ====
Crow-Armstrong with the Cubs in 2026

Before the 2026 season, Crow-Armstrong and the Cubs agreed to a six-year, $115 million extension through the 2032 season. On June 15, 2026, Crow-Armstrong hit for the cycle against the Colorado Rockies, making him the 13th player in Cubs franchise history to achieve the feat. On July 5, Crow-Armstrong was named an All-Star for the second straight season. In the All-Star Game, he went 1-for-1 with a single in the 8th inning.

On August 17, Crow-Armstrong hit a walk-off home run in the 10th inning against the Chicago White Sox (his second of the game and fourth hit of the game) to achieve his second consecutive 30–30 season, the first player in Cubs history to achieve this feat. Against the Cincinnati Reds on August 29, he had his first career three-homer game.

On September 14, Crow-Armstrong tied the Cubs franchise record for most home runs by a lefty, tying with Billy Williams with his 42nd homer of the season. On September 24 against the Marlins, after a leadoff walk in the bottom of the first inning, Crow-Armstrong stole his 40th base of the season to become the seventh player in MLB history to achieve a 40–40 season. After the end of the regular season, Crow-Armstrong tied Kyle Schwarber for the most home runs in the regular season with 45 home runs.

In the 2026 season, he led the league in on base plus slugging percentage (.943), games played (162), and runs scored (119), and batted .280/.372/.570 in 626 at-bats (5th in the NL) with eight triples (5th), 45 home runs (1st, tied with Schwarber), 107 RBI (3rd), 41 stolen bases (2nd), and 189 strikeouts (5th). He drew criticism for his behavior in the 2026 National League Wild Card Series against the San Diego Padres, yelling at an umpire after two separate calls. He did not record any hits as the Cubs were swept in two games.

On November 1, 2026, Crow-Armstrong won the Gold Glove Award for the second consecutive time for center field. On November 2, he was named a finalist for the National League Most Valuable Player Award alongside Shohei Ohtani and Brice Turang. On November 5, he was named the finalist for the Silver Slugger Award in the National League for the outfield. On November 6, he won the National League Platinum Glove Award, marking the first Platinum Glove Award in his career. On November 11, Crow-Armstrong won the Hank Aaron Award alongside American League winner Yordan Alvarez. On November 12, Crow-Armstrong won the Most Valuable Player Award for the first time in his career in the National League, doing so unanimously.

== International career ==
=== Age-group career ===
Crow-Armstrong has played for USA Baseball in several international youth tournaments. In 2014, he joined the Under-12 National Team, which went 7–2 during the COPABE U-12 Pan-American Championship earning a silver medal after losing to Nicaragua. In 2016, he was a member of the Under-14 National Team Development Program, and in 2017, he joined the Under-15 National Team. The team shared the gold medal with the Dominican Republic at the COPABE U-15 Pan-American Championships after the gold medal game was canceled. In 2018, Crow-Armstrong joined the Under-18 National Team. He started every game for the U.S. and helped them earn gold at the COPABE U-18 Pan-American Championships. In 2019, he started in the Under-17 National Team Development Program and was called up to the 18U National Team for the 2019 U-18 Baseball World Cup. Crow-Armstrong finished the tournament with a .364 batting average, 12 hits, nine runs scored, four doubles, three triples, and three stolen bases. Crow-Armstrong was named to the U-18 All-World Team as the U.S. won silver.

=== Senior career ===
Crow-Armstrong represented the United States Senior National Team at the 2026 World Baseball Classic. He appeared in six games during the tournament, reaching base safely in four contests while batting .263/.333/.632 with two home runs and six RBIs. On March 10, he hit two home runs and drove in four runs against Italy, becoming only the third American player to record a multi-home run game in World Baseball Classic history, joining Ken Griffey Jr. and Trea Turner. He finished second on Team USA in RBIs. Team USA reached the championship game before falling to Venezuela, earning a second-place finish in the tournament.

== Career highlights ==
=== Awards and honors ===
==== MLB ====
- 2× All-Star (2025, 2026)
- National League Most Valuable Player (2026)
- Players Choice Award for Player of the Year (2026)
- Players Choice Award for National League Most Outstanding Player (2026)
- Baseball America Major League Player of the Year (2026)
- Baseball Digest Player of the Year (2026)
- The Sporting News MLB Player of the Year (2026)
- All-MLB First Team (2026)
- All-MLB Second Team (2025)
- Fielding Bible Defensive Player of the Year (2026)
- Platinum Glove Award (2026)
- 2× Gold Glove Award (2025, 2026)
- National League Hank Aaron Award (2026)
- National League home run leader (2026)
- 2× 30–30 club (2025, 2026)
- 40–40 club (2026)
- 2× National League Player of the Month (June 2026; August 2026)
- 2× National League Player of the Week (June 7, 2026; June 21, 2026)
- Hit for the reverse natural cycle on June 15, 2026

==== MiLB ====
- Midwest League champion (2022)
- MiLB Awards All-MiLB Prospect Second Team (2023)
- 2× All-Star Futures Game selection (2022, 2023)
- Baseball America Double-A All-Star (2022)
- Southern League Postseason All-Star (2023)
- Midwest League Postseason All-Star (2022)
- 2× MiLB.com Organization All-Star (2022, 2023)
- MiLB Awards Defensive Player of the Year (2023)
- Rawlings MiLB Gold Glove Award (2022)
- Midwest League Player of the Month (August 2022)
- International League Player of the Week (May 26, 2024)
- Carolina League Player of the Week (May 1, 2022)

==== International ====
- World Baseball Classic Silver Medalist (2026)
- U-18 Baseball World Cup Silver Medalist (2019)
- COPABE U-18 Pan-American Championships Gold Medalist (2018)
- COPABE U-15 Pan-American Championships Gold Medalist (2017)
- COPABE U-12 Pan-American Championships Silver Medalist (2014)
- U-18 Baseball World Cup All-World Team (2019)

==== High school ====
- Mission League champion (2018)
- Los Angeles Daily News Baseball Player of the Year (2019)
- Under Armour All-American (2019)
- Perfect Game All-American (2019)
- MaxPreps High School Baseball All-American Second Team (2019)
- MaxPreps Underclass All-American Baseball Junior Team (2019)
- MaxPreps California All-State Baseball Large Schools First Team (2019)
- Prep Baseball Report California All-State First Team (2019)
- All-CIF Southern Section Division I Baseball Team (2019)
- Los Angeles Times All-Star High School Baseball Team (2019)
- Los Angeles Daily News All-Area Baseball Team (2019)

=== Records ===
==== MLB records ====
- Most games with 4+ hits, 2+ extra-base hits, and a home run in a single season: 7 (2026)

==== Cubs franchise records ====
- 13th Cycle in Cubs history (2026)
- Most home runs by a left-handed hitter in a single season: 45 (2026)
- Most home runs by a player at age 24 or younger in a single season: 45 (2026)
- Most games with a home run and a stolen base in a single season: 9 (2026)
- First player in franchise history to have 30+ home runs, 30+ doubles, and 30+ stolen bases in a single season (2026)
- First player in franchise history to achieve back-to-back 30–30 seasons (2025, 2026)
- First player in franchise history to achieve a 40–40 season (2026)

== Personal life ==
Crow-Armstrong played Little League Baseball in the Sherman Oaks Little League. His parents, Matthew John Armstrong and Ashley Crow, are both actors.

Crow-Armstrong bleaches his hair blond. Before the 2025 season, he had blue stars in his hair. Before the 2025 season, Crow-Armstrong changed his uniform number from 52 to 4 after losing a bet to Cubs president of baseball operations Jed Hoyer, after Hoyer made a 12-foot basketball shot.

== See also ==
- 30–30 club
- Chicago Cubs award winners and league leaders
- Chicago Cubs

== Notes ==
Awards and achievements
Preceded by Aaron Judge	Baseball America Major League Player of the Year; 2026	Most recent
Preceded by Cal Raleigh	Baseball Digest Major League Player of the Year; 2026	Most recent
Preceded by JJ Bleday; CJ Abrams	National League Player of the Month; June 2026; August 2026	Succeeded by CJ Abrams; Elly De La Cruz
Preceded by Byron Buxton	Hitting for the cycle June 15, 2026	Succeeded by Bryce Harper
