= Chris Lubanski =

American baseball player

- Outfielder
- Born: March 24, 1985 (age 40); Lansdale, Pennsylvania, U.S.
- Bats: Left Throws: Left
- Stats at Baseball Reference
Medals
Men's baseball
Representing United States
World Junior Baseball Championship
Bronze medal – third place	2002 Sherbrooke	Team

Christopher Sebastian Lubanski (born March 24, 1985) is an American former professional baseball player who played from 2003 to 2011. He was selected by the Kansas City Royals as the 5th overall in the 2003 MLB draft. In 2003, he was selected as the Gatorade High School Baseball National Player of the Year. He is a 2003 graduate of Kennedy-Kenrick Catholic High School in Norristown, Pennsylvania.
