= Aiden Ruiz =

American baseball player (born 2007)

Pittsburgh Pirates
- Shortstop
- Born: March 28, 2007 (age 19); Queens, New York
- Bats: Switch Throws: Switch
Medals
Men's baseball
Representing United States
U-18 Baseball World Cup
Gold medal – first place	2025 Naha-Itoman	Team

Aiden Ruiz (born March 28, 2007) is an American professional baseball shortstop in the Pittsburgh Pirates organization.

== Amateur career ==
Ruiz attended Stony Brook School in New York, where he played baseball, and was coached by Jon Brewer Ruiz helped Stony Brook win the 2024 NYSAIS Baseball State Championship. He committed to play college baseball at the Vanderbilt University for the Commodores. In 2025, the summer before his senior year, Ruiz helped win a gold medal for the United States U-18 baseball team during the 2025 U-18 Baseball World Cup. He was named to the All-World team. Following the end of his high school career, he was invited to attend the 2026 MLB Draft Combine at Chase Field.

== Professional career ==
Ruiz was considered a top prospect for the 2026 Major League Baseball draft. He was drafted in the second round with the 44th pick in the 2026 Major League Baseball draft by the Pittsburgh Pirates. He signed with the Pirates for an over-slot signing bonus of $3.5 million.

== Personal life ==
Ruiz's father, Sam, played minor league baseball for the Chicago White Sox. Ruiz mentioned that he was mentored by Francisco Lindor during his high school career.
