= Chicago Cubs award winners and league leaders =

This is a list of award winners and league leaders for the Chicago Cubs professional baseball team.

== Awards ==
=== World Series Most Valuable Player ===
- 2016 – Ben Zobrist

=== League Championship Series Most Valuable Player ===
- 2016 – Javier Báez & Jon Lester

=== Most Valuable Player ===
- 1911 – Frank Schulte
- 1929 – Rogers Hornsby
- 1930 – Hack Wilson
- 1935 – Gabby Hartnett
- 1945 – Phil Cavarretta
- 1952 – Hank Sauer
- 1958 – Ernie Banks
- 1959 – Ernie Banks
- 1984 – Ryne Sandberg
- 1987 – Andre Dawson
- 1998 – Sammy Sosa
- 2016 – Kris Bryant
- 2026 – Pete Crow-Armstrong

=== Cy Young ===
- 1971 – Ferguson Jenkins
- 1979 – Bruce Sutter
- 1984 – Rick Sutcliffe
- 1992 – Greg Maddux
- 2015 – Jake Arrieta

=== Rookie of the Year ===
- 1961 – Billy Williams
- 1962 – Ken Hubbs
- 1989 – Jerome Walton
- 1998 – Kerry Wood
- 2008 – Geovany Soto
- 2015 – Kris Bryant

=== Gold Glove Award ===
- Pitcher
  - Greg Maddux (1990, 1991, 1992, 2004, 2005)
  - Bobby Shantz (1964)
- Catcher
  - Jody Davis (1986)
  - Randy Hundley (1967)
- First base
  - Mark Grace (1992, 1993, 1995, 1996)
  - Derrek Lee (2005, 2007)
  - Anthony Rizzo (2016, 2018, 2019, 2020)
- Second base
  - Darwin Barney (2012)
  - Glenn Beckert (1968)
  - Nico Hoerner (2023, 2025)
  - Ken Hubbs (1962)
  - Ryne Sandberg (1983, 1984, 1985, 1986, 1987, 1988, 1989, 1990, 1991)
- Shortstop
  - Javier Báez (2020)
  - Ernie Banks (1960)
  - Don Kessinger (1969, 1970)
  - Dansby Swanson (2023)
- Third base
  - Alex Bregman (2026)
  - Ron Santo (1964, 1965, 1966, 1967, 1968)
- Outfield
  - Pete Crow-Armstrong (2025, 2026)
  - Andre Dawson (1987, 1988)
  - Bob Dernier (1984)
  - Ian Happ (2022, 2023, 2024, 2025)
  - Jason Heyward (2016, 2017)

=== Platinum Glove Award ===
- 2016 – Anthony Rizzo
- 2026 – Pete Crow-Armstrong

=== Wilson Defensive Player of the Year Award ===
Note: In its first two years, the award was given to a player on each MLB team; one awardee was then named the Overall Defensive Player of the Year for the American League and another for the National League. Starting in 2014, the award is now given to one player at each position for all of Major League Baseball; one of the nine awardees is then named the Overall Defensive Player of the Year for all of Major League Baseball.

Team (one award for each team; all positions) (2012–2013)

- Darwin Barney (2012, 2013)

MLB (one award for each position) (2014–present)

- First baseman
  - Anthony Rizzo (2016)
- Second baseman
  - none
- Shortstop
  - none
- Third baseman
  - none
- Left fielder
  - none
- Center fielder
  - none
- Right fielder
  - none
- Catcher
  - none
- Pitcher
  - none

=== Silver Slugger Award ===
- Pitcher
  - Jake Arrieta (2016)
  - Carlos Zambrano (2006, 2008, 2009)
- Catcher
  - Michael Barrett (2005)
- First baseman
  - Derrek Lee (2005)
  - Anthony Rizzo (2016)
- Second baseman
  - Javier Báez (2018)
  - Ryne Sandberg (1984, 1985, 1988, 1989, 1990, 1991, 1992)
- Shortstop
  - none
- Third baseman
  - Alex Bregman (2026)
  - Aramis Ramírez (2011)
- Outfielder
  - Pete Crow-Armstrong (2026)
  - Andre Dawson (1987)
  - Leon Durham (1982)
  - Sammy Sosa (1995, 1998, 1999, 2000, 2001, 2002)
  - Kyle Tucker (2025)
- Utility player
  - Cody Bellinger (2023)

=== All-MLB Team ===
==== All-MLB Team First Team ====
- 2020 - SP Yu Darvish
- 2026 - OF Pete Crow-Armstrong

==== All-MLB Team Second Team ====
- 2024 - SP Shota Imanaga
- 2025 - OF Pete Crow-Armstrong
- 2026 - 3B Alex Bregman

=== Manager of the Year ===
- 1984 – Jim Frey
- 1989 – Don Zimmer
- 2008 – Lou Pinella
- 2015 – Joe Maddon

=== Hank Aaron Award (NL) ===
- 1999 - Sammy Sosa
- 2008 - Aramis Ramirez
- 2016 - Kris Bryant
- 2026 - Pete Crow-Armstrong

=== Roberto Clemente Award winners ===
- Rick Sutcliffe – 1987
- Sammy Sosa – 1998
- Anthony Rizzo – 2017

=== MLB All Star Game Most Valuable Player ===
- 1975 - Bill Madlock*

* indicates award was shared

=== Comeback Player of the Year (NL) ===
- 2023 - Cody Bellinger

=== Major League Baseball All-Star Game Winning Pitcher ===
- 1952 - Bob Rush
- 1963 - Larry Jackson
- 1978 - Bruce Sutter
- 1979 - Bruce Sutter
- 1987 - Lee Smith

=== Home Run Derby Champion ===
- 1987 – Andre Dawson
- 1990 – Ryne Sandberg
- 2000 – Sammy Sosa

=== MLB "This Year in Baseball Awards" ===
Note: These awards are voted on by five groups for all of Major League Baseball (i.e., not one per league).
Note: These awards were renamed the "GIBBY Awards" (Greatness in Baseball Yearly) in 2010 and then the "Esurance MLB Awards" in 2015.

==== "Esurance MLB Awards" Best Starting Pitcher ====
- 2015 – Jake Arrieta

==== "Esurance MLB Awards" Best Rookie ====
- 2015 – Kris Bryant

==== "Esurance MLB Awards" Best Breakout Player ====
- 2015 – Jake Arrieta

==== "Esurance MLB Awards" Best Manager ====
- 2015 – Joe Maddon

==== "Esurance MLB Awards" Best Executive ====
- 2016 – Theo Epstein

=== National League Championship Series MVP Award ===
See: National League Championship Series#Most Valuable Player Award

- 2016 – Javier Baez and Jon Lester

=== DHL Hometown Heroes (2006) ===
- Ernie Banks — voted by MLB fans as the most outstanding player in the history of the franchise, based on on-field performance, leadership quality and character value

=== Player of the Month (NL) ===
- 1975
  - September - Andre Thornton
- 1980
  - April - Dave Kingman
- 1982
  - August - Bill Buckner
- 1983
  - August - Mel Hall
- 1984
  - May - Leon Durham
  - June - Ryne Sandberg
  - August - Keith Moreland
- 1987
  - August - Andre Dawson
- 1989
  - July - Mark Grace
- 1990
  - May - Andre Dawson
  - June - Ryne Sandberg
- 1996
  - July - Sammy Sosa
- 1998
  - June - Sammy Sosa
- 1999
  - May - Sammy Sosa
- 2000
  - July - Sammy Sosa
- 2001
  - August - Sammy Sosa
- 2005
  - April - Derrek Lee
- 2007
  - June - Alfonso Soriano
- 2009
  - September - Derrek Lee
- 2016
  - August - Kris Bryant
- 2023
  - July - Cody Bellinger

=== Players Choice Awards NL Outstanding Player ===
- 1998 – Sammy Sosa

=== Players Choice Awards NL Outstanding Pitcher ===
- 2016 – Kyle Hendricks

=== Players Choice Awards NL Outstanding Rookie ===
- 1998 – Kerry Wood
- 2008 – Geovany Soto
- 2015 – Kris Bryant

=== Sporting News NL Rookie of the Year Award ===
- 2015 – Kris Bryant

=== Players Choice Awards Marvin Miller Man of the Year Award ===
- 1999 – Sammy Sosa

=== Sporting News Executive of the Year Award ===
- 2016 – Theo Epstein

== Team award ==
- 1876 – National League pennant
- 1880
- 1881
- 1882
- 1885
- 1886
- 1906
- 1907
- 1907 – World Series championship
- 1908
- 1908 – World Series championship
- 1910
- 1918
- 1929
- 1932
- 1935
- 1938
- 1945
- 2016 – Warren C. Giles Trophy (National League championship)
- 2016 – Commissioner's Trophy (World Series)
- 2016 – Baseball America Organization of the Year
- 2017 (2016 Cubs) – Laureus World Sports Award for Team of the Year

== League Leaders ==
=== NL Batting Champions ===
- 1876 – Ross Barnes
- 1880 – George Gore
- 1881 – Cap Anson
- 1884 – King Kelly
- 1886 – King Kelly
- 1888 – Cap Anson
- 1912 – Heinie Zimmerman
- 1945 – Phil Cavarretta
- 1972 – Billy Williams
- 1975 – Bill Madlock
- 1976 – Bill Madlock
- 1980 – Bill Buckner
- 2005 – Derrek Lee

=== NL Stolen Bases Champions ===
- 1897 – Bill Lange
- 1903 – Frank Chance
- 1906 – Frank Chance
- 1928 – Kiki Cuyler
- 1929 – Kiki Cuyler
- 1930 – Kiki Cuyler
- 1935 – Augie Galan
- 1937 – Augie Galan
- 1938 – Stan Hack
- 1939 – Stan Hack

=== NL Home Run Champions ===
- 1884 – Ned Williamson
- 1885 – Abner Dalrymple
- 1888 – Jimmy Ryan
- 1911 – Frank Schulte
- 1912 – Heinie Zimmerman
- 1916 – Cy Williams
- 1926 – Hack Wilson
- 1927 – Cy Williams
- 1928 – Hack Wilson
- 1930 – Hack Wilson
- 1943 – Bill Nicholson
- 1944 – Bill Nicholson
- 1958 – Ernie Banks
- 1960 – Ernie Banks
- 1979 – Dave Kingman
- 1987 – Andre Dawson
- 1990 – Ryne Sandberg
- 2000 – Sammy Sosa
- 2002 – Sammy Sosa

=== NL Wins Champions ===
- 1876 – Albert Spalding
- 1881 – Larry Corcoran
- 1885 – John Clarkson
- 1887 – John Clarkson
- 1890 – Bill Hutchison
- 1891 – Bill Hutchison
- 1892 – Bill Hutchison
- 1909 – Mordecai Brown
- 1912 – Larry Cheney
- 1918 – Hippo Vaughn
- 1920 – Grover Cleveland Alexander
- 1927 – Charlie Root
- 1929 – Pat Malone
- 1932 – Lon Warneke
- 1938 – Bill Lee
- 1964 – Larry Jackson
- 1971 – Ferguson Jenkins
- 1987 – Rick Sutcliffe
- 1992 – Greg Maddux
- 2006 – Carlos Zambrano
- 2015 – Jake Arrieta
- 2018 – Jon Lester
- 2020 – Yu Darvish

=== NL Strikeout Champions ===
- 1880 – Larry Corcoran
- 1887 – John Clarkson
- 1892 – Bill Hutchison
- 1906 – Fred Beebe
- 1909 – Orval Overall
- 1918 – Hippo Vaughn
- 1919 – Hippo Vaughn
- 1920 – Grover Cleveland Alexander
- 1929 – Pat Malone
- 1938 – Clay Bryant
- 1946 – Johnny Schmitz
- 1955 – Sam Jones
- 1956 – Sam Jones
- 1958 – Sam Jones
- 1969 – Ferguson Jenkins
- 2003 – Kerry Wood

== Other achievements ==
=== Baseball Hall of Famers ===
See: Chicago Cubs#Hall of Famers

=== Retired numbers ===
See: Chicago Cubs#Retired numbers

=== Best Breakthrough Athlete ESPY Award ===
- 2016 – Jake Arrieta

=== NAB Broadcasting Hall of Fame ===
- 1994 – Harry Caray

=== Chicagoland Sports Hall of Fame ===
Cubs in the Chicagoland Sports Hall of Fame
| No. | Player | Position | Tenure | Notes |
| 14 | Ernie Banks | SS/1B | 1953–1971 | |
| 18 | Glenn Beckert | 2B | 1965–1973 | |
| — | Jack Brickhouse | Broadcaster | 1941–1945; 1948–1981 | |
| 39 | Bill Campbell | P | 1982–1983 | |
| — | Harry Caray | Broadcaster | 1982–1997 | |
| 3, 23, 43, 44 | Phil Cavarretta | 1B/OF; Manager | 1934–1953; 1951–1953 | Born in Chicago |
| — | Frank Chance | 1B; Manager | 1898–1912; 1905–1912 | |
| 8 | Andre Dawson | RF/CF | 1987–1992 | |
| — | Paddy Driscoll | IF | 1917 | Born in Evanston, attended Northwestern University |
| — | Johnny Evers | 2B; Manager | 1902–1913; 1921 | |
| 6, 7, 8 | Charlie Grimm | 1B; Manager | 1925–1936; 1932–1938, 1944–1949, 1960 | |
| 6, 20, 25, 31, 34, 39, 49 | Stan Hack | 3B; Manager | 1932–1947; 1954–1956 | |
| 2, 7, 9 | Gabby Hartnett | C Manager | 1922–1940; 1938–1940 | |
| 2, 4 | Billy Herman | 2B | 1931–1941 | |
| 30 | Ken Holtzman | P | 1965–1971; 1978–1979 | |
| 4, 5, 9 | Randy Hundley | C | 1966–1973; 1976–1977 | |
| 31 | Ferguson Jenkins | P | 1966–1973; 1982–1983 | |
| — | Yosh Kawano | Clubhouse Manager | 1981–2008 | |
| 61 | Bob Kennedy | Manager | 1963–1965 | Born in Chicago |
| 11 | Don Kessinger | SS | 1964–1975 | |
| 36 | John Klippstein | P | 1950–1954 | |
| 7 | Fred Lindstrom | 3B/OF | 1935 | Born on Chicago's South Side |
| — | Frank Maloney | Executive | 1981–present | |
| 8, 43 | Bill Nicholson | OF | 1939–1948 | |
| 33, 48 | Andy Pafko | CF | 1943–1951 | |
| 23 | Ryne Sandberg | 2B | 1982–1994, 1996-1997 | |
| 21, 24 | Scott Sanderson | P | 1984–1989 | |
| 10, 15 | Ron Santo | 3B | 1960–1973 | |
| 9, 43 | Hank Sauer | OF | 1949–1955 | |
| 33, 47 | Bob Shaw | P | 1967 | |
| 49 | Tim Stoddard | P | 1984 | |
| — | Joe Tinker | SS; Manager | 1902–1912; 1916 | |
| — | William Veeck, Sr. | Executive | 1919–1933 | |
| 4, 26, 41 | Billy Williams | LF | 1959–1974 | |
| — | Bert Wilson | Broadcaster | 1943–1955 | |
| — | Hack Wilson | OF | 1926–1931 | |
| — | Philip K. Wrigley | Owner | 1932–1977 | Born in Chicago |

== See also ==
- List of MLB awards
- Baseball awards#United States
