= Will Brick =

American baseball player (born 2008)

Toronto Blue Jays
- Catcher
- Born: June 6, 2008 (age 18); Memphis, Tennessee, U.S.
- Bats: Right Throws: Right
Medals
Men's baseball
Representing United States
U-18 Baseball World Cup
Gold medal – first place	2025 Naha-Itoman	Team

William Arthur Brick (born June 6, 2008) is an American professional baseball catcher in the Toronto Blue Jays organization.

== Amateur career ==
Brick attended Christian Brothers High School in Memphis, Tennessee. In September 2025, he played for the United States national under-18 baseball team at the 2025 U-18 Baseball World Cup in Japan and was named to the all-tournament team. The following month, he announced he would be reclassifying from the class of 2027 to the class of 2026. Shortly after, he committed to play college baseball at Mississippi State University. As a senior in 2026, he hit .526 with five home runs, 25 RBI, and nine doubles and was named the Gatorade Tennessee Baseball Player of the Year. He was also named All-Metro Baseball Player of the Year by the The Commercial Appeal. Following the end of his high school career, he was invited to attend the 2026 MLB Draft Combine at Chase Field.

== Professional career ==
Brick was considered a top prospect for the 2026 Major League Baseball draft. He was selected by the Toronto Blue Jays in the fourth round with the 131st overall pick. He signed with the Blue Jays for a $2.5 million signing bonus.
