= Gio Rojas =

American baseball player (born 2007)

Texas Rangers
- Pitcher
- Born: June 29, 2007 (age 19); Denver, Colorado, U.S.
- Bats: Right Throws: Left
Medals
Men's baseball
Representing United States
U-18 Baseball World Cup
Gold medal – first place	2025 Naha-Itoman	Team

Giovanni Anibal Rojas (born June 29, 2007) is an American baseball pitcher in the Texas Rangers organization.

== Amateur career ==
Rojas attends Marjory Stoneman Douglas High School in Parkland, Florida. As a junior in 2025, he was the Florida Gatorade Baseball Player of the Year after going 12–0 with a 0.72 earned run average (ERA) and 128 strikeouts as a pitcher and also hit .375 with two home runs and 32 runs batted in (RBI). He was also named Baseball America's pitcher of the year and the Broward 7A-5A baseball co-player of the year. After the season he played for the United States national under-18 baseball team, winning a gold medal at the U-18 Baseball World Cup. He committed to play college baseball at the University of Miami.

Rojas entered his senior year in 2026 as a top prospect for the 2026 MLB draft.

== Professional career ==
Rojas was drafted with the 16th pick by the Texas Rangers in the 2026 Major League Baseball draft. He became the first pitcher from Stoneman Douglas to get selected in the first round. On July 21, 2026, he signed with the Rangers for an under-slot signing bonus of $4.6 million.
