= United States national under-18 baseball team =

USA national U-18 baseball team

Information
- Country: United States
- Federation: USA Baseball
- Confederation: WBSC Americas

Uniforms
Home	Away	Alternate

Medal record

U-18 World Cup
Gold medal – first place	1982 Knoxville	
Gold medal – first place	1988 Sydney	
Gold medal – first place	1989 Trois-Rivières	
Gold medal – first place	1995 Cape Cod	
Gold medal – first place	1999 Kaohsiung	
Gold medal – first place	2012 Seoul	
Gold medal – first place	2013 Taichung	
Gold medal – first place	2015 Osaka	
Gold medal – first place	2017 Thunder Bay	
Gold medal – first place	2022 Sarasota & Bradenton	
Gold medal – first place	2025 Okinawa	
Silver medal – second place	1981 Newark	
Silver medal – second place	1983 Johnstown	
Silver medal – second place	1984 Saskatoon	
Silver medal – second place	1985 Albany	
Silver medal – second place	1987 Windsor	
Silver medal – second place	1992 Monterrey	
Silver medal – second place	1993 Windsor	
Silver medal – second place	1994 Brandon	
Silver medal – second place	2000 Edmonton	
Silver medal – second place	2006 Sancti Spíritus	
Silver medal – second place	2008 Edmonton	
Silver medal – second place	2019 Gijang	
Bronze medal – third place	1986 Windsor	
Bronze medal – third place	1990 Cuba	
Bronze medal – third place	1991 Brandon	
Bronze medal – third place	1996 Sancti Spíritus	
Bronze medal – third place	2002 Sherbrooke	

The United States national under-18 baseball team is the national under-18 baseball team of United States in international baseball competitions.

The U.S. national U-18 team debuted their international team in the Friendship Series, in 1983. The team has won the U-18 Baseball World Cup and its predecessor tournaments a total of 11 times, recently in 2025.

== Current roster ==
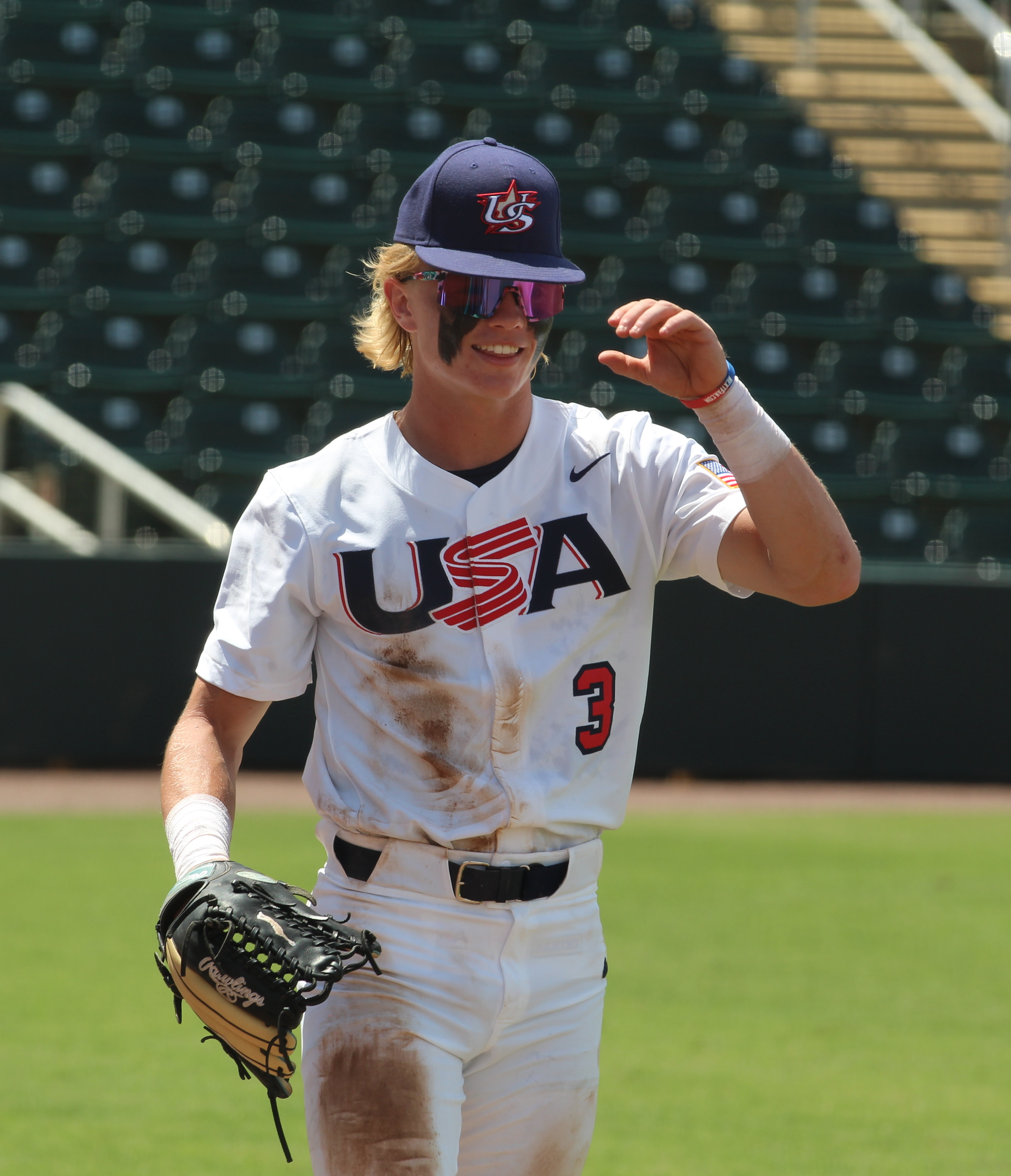
Max Clark with the USA U-18 Baseball team in 2022

The full roster for the 2025 18U National Team is as follows:

2025 18U National Team roster
Players		Coaches
Pitchers: 8 Carson Bolemon; 24 Coleman Borthwick; 15 Brody Crane; 18 Jared Grindlinger; 23 Cole Koeninger; 11 Trey Rangel; 12 Giovanni Rojas; 25 Matthew Sharman; 6 Kaden Waechter	Catchers: 16 Will Brick; 2 Andrew Costello; Infielders: 21 James Clark; 10 Grady Emerson; 7 Jaden Jackson; 9 Jacob Lombard; 1 Aiden Ruiz; 17 CJ Sampson; 4 Brody Schumaker; Outfielders: 13 Jorvorskie Lane Jr.; 14 Anthony Murphy	Manager: Rick Eckstein; Coaches: Brad Penny; David Eckstein; Steve Stone

== Competitive record ==
=== U-18 World Cup ===
U-18 Baseball World Cup record
Year	Result	Position	Pld	W	L	%	RS	RA
(United States) 1981	Runners-up	2nd						
(United States) 1982	Champions	1st						
(United States) 1983	Runners-up	2nd						
(Canada) 1984	Runners-up	2nd						
(United States) 1985	Runners-up	2nd						
(Canada) 1986	Third place	3rd						
(Canada) 1987	Runners-up	2nd	7	4	3	.571		
(Australia) 1988	Champions	1st	8	6	2	.750		
(Canada) 1989	Champions	1st	7	7	0	1.000		
(Cuba) 1990	Third place	3rd						
(Canada) 1991	Third place	3rd	10	8	2	.800		
(Mexico) 1992	Runners-up	2nd	13	9	4	.692		
(Canada) 1993	Runners-up	2nd	9	8	1	.889		
(Canada) 1994	Runners-up	2nd	11	7	4	.636		
(United States) 1995	Champions	1st	9	8	1	.889		
(Cuba) 1996	Third place	3rd	6	5	1	.833		
(Canada) 1997	Fourth Place	4th	6	4	2	.667		
(Taiwan) 1999	Champions	1st	7	6	1	.857		
(Canada) 2000	Runners-up	2nd	8	6	2	.750		
(Canada) 2002	Third place	3rd	8	7	1	.875		
(Taiwan) 2004	Fourth Place	4th	6	4	2	.667		
(Cuba) 2006	Runners-up	2nd	8	5	3	.625		
(Canada) 2008	Runners-up	2nd	8	7	1	.875		
(Canada) 2010	Fifth place	5th	8	7	1	.875	78	18
(South Korea) 2012	Champions	1st	9	7	2	.778	60	22
(Taiwan) 2013	Champions	1st	9	8	1	.889	63	29
(Japan) 2015	Champions	1st	9	8	1	.889	56	23
(Canada) 2017	Champions	1st	9	9	0	1.000	61	5
(South Korea) 2019	Runners-up	2nd	9	7	2	.778	60	31
(United States) 2022 (Note: Originally scheduled to be held in 2021, but due to the COVID-19 pandemic, postponed to September 2022.)	Champions	1st	9	8	1	.889	68	27
(Taiwan) 2023	Fourth Place	4th	9	5	4	.556	30	24
(Japan) 2025	Champions	1st	9	8	1	.889	55	10
(China) 2027	Qualified							
Total	11 Titles	32/33	—					

== Record by team ==
Team	Main tournament				
Team	GP	W	L	RF	RA
Canada	3	3	0	16	7
Italy	1	1	0	8	0
Colombia	2	2	0	23	7
Czech Republic	1	1	0	11	1
Netherlands	1	1	0	17	0
Brazil	1	1	0	5	2
Australia	3	2	1	17	4
Japan	5	4	1	25	15
Mexico	1	1	0	5	1
Venezuela	2	2	0	18	7
Cuba	2	2	0	12	10
Chinese Taipei	2	2	0	12	6
South Korea	3	2	1	11	13
Total	28	16	12		

== See also ==
- United States national baseball team
- United States women's national baseball team
- USA Baseball
- USA Baseball National Training Complex
