= Hank Aaron Award =

Annual Major League Baseball award

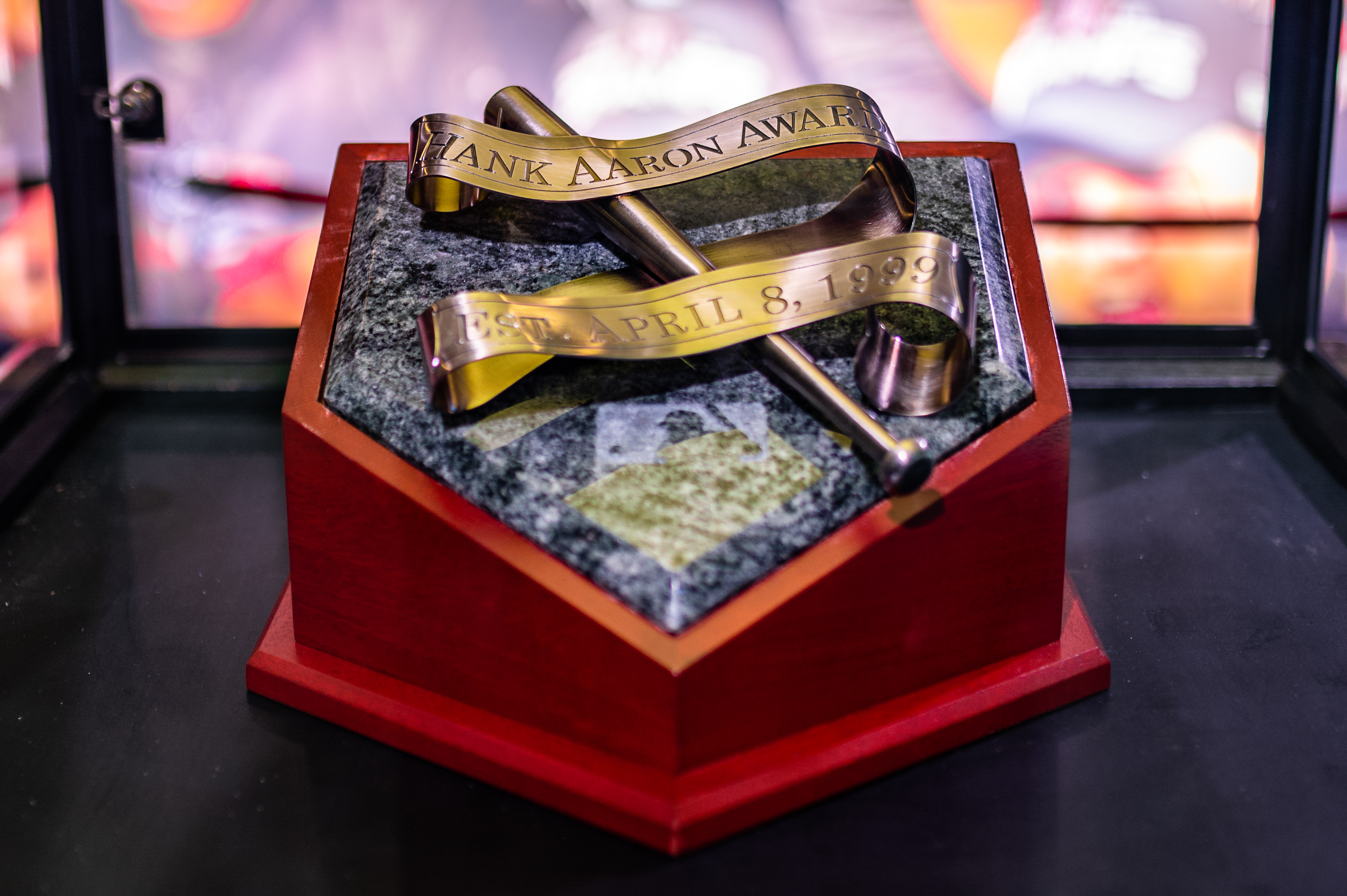
- Sport: Baseball
- League: Major League Baseball
- Awarded for: Top hitter in the American League and National League
- Presented by: Major League Baseball

History
- First award: 1999
- Most wins: Alex Rodriguez (4)
- Most recent: Yordan Alvarez (AL); Pete Crow-Armstrong (NL)

The Hank Aaron Award is given annually to the Major League Baseball (MLB) players selected as the top hitter in each league, as voted on by baseball fans and members of the media. It was introduced in 1999 to commemorate the 25th anniversary of Hank Aaron's surpassing of Babe Ruth's career home run mark of 714 home runs. The award was the first major award to be introduced by Major League Baseball in 19 years.

For the 1999 season, a winner was selected using an objective points system. Hits, home runs, and runs batted in (RBI) were given certain point values and the winner was the player who had the highest tabulated points total.

In 2000, the system was changed to a ballot in which each MLB team's radio and television play-by-play broadcasters and color analysts voted for three players in each league. Their first-place vote receives five points, the second-place vote receives three points, and the third-place vote receives one point. Beginning in 2003, fans were allowed to vote via MLB's official website, MLB.com. Fans' votes account for 30% of the points, while broadcasters' and analysts' votes account for the other 70%.

The award is handed out to the winners of both leagues before Game 4 of the World Series (mostly after Game 2 due to travel to a different venue) each year, with Aaron himself presenting the awards until the 2019 World Series and his death in 2021 (except 2018 when it is handed out in Game 3 and 2019 when it is handed out in Game 2). The first winners of the award were Manny Ramirez and Sammy Sosa in 1999, while the most recent winners are Yordan Alvarez and Pete Crow-Armstrong. Alex Rodriguez won the award four times, the most of any player. Ohtani is the first player to win the award in both leagues. The winner with the most hits was Ronald Acuña Jr. in 2023, Barry Bonds in 2001 had the most home runs, and Manny Ramírez in 1999 had the most RBIs. Players from the New York Yankees have won the award six times, the most of any team.

== Trophy ==
The Hank Aaron Award has a maritaca granite base and an antique bat and banner combination on the top. It weighs 12 pounds (5.4 kg) and sits on a base of cherry wood.

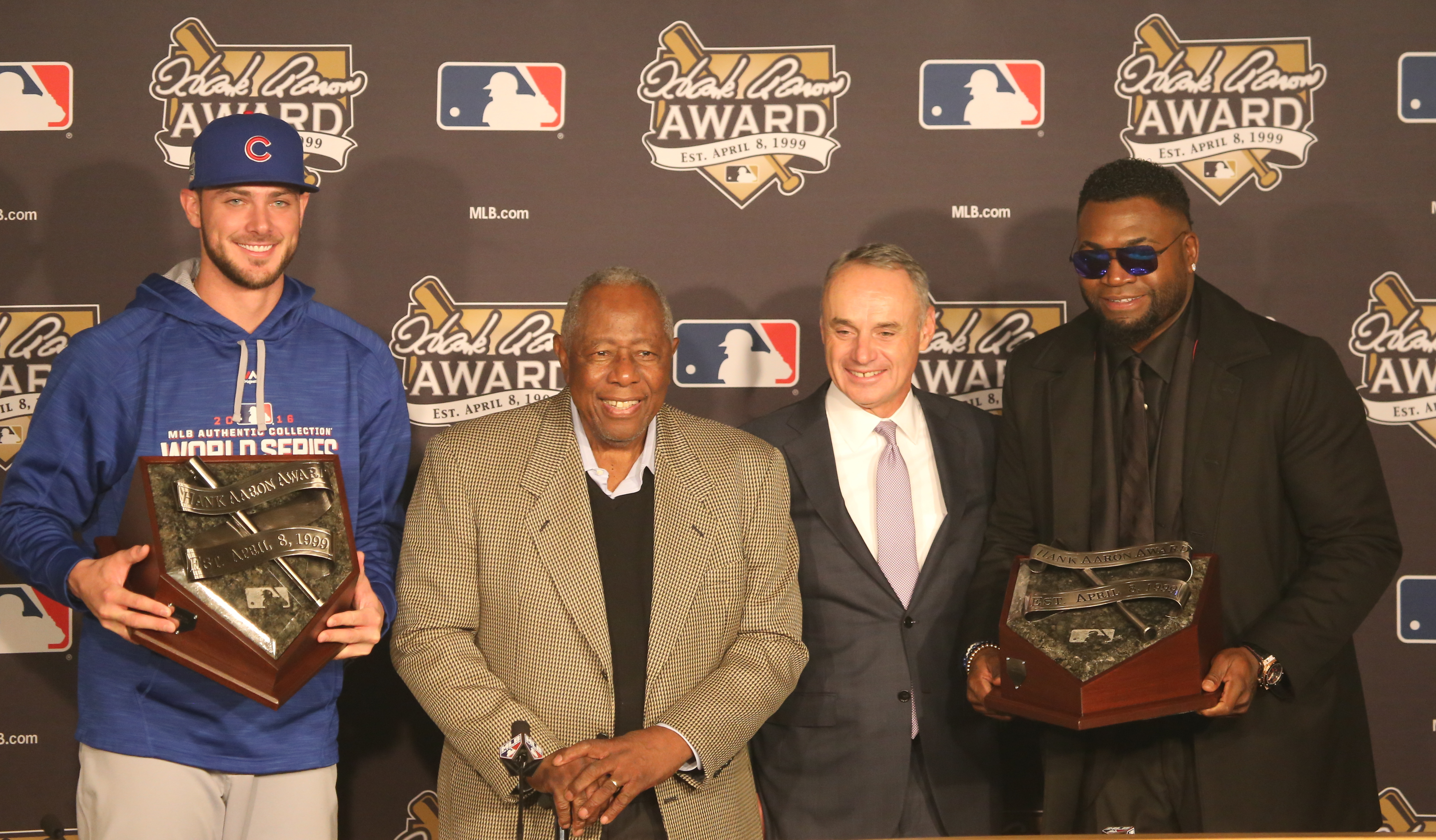
Kris Bryant (far left) and David Ortiz (far right) pose with Hank Aaron (center left) and Rob Manfred (center right) after receiving the 2016 awards

== Key ==
Year	Links to the corresponding Major League Baseball season
Player (X)	Denotes winning player and number of times they had won the award at that point
HR	Home runs
RBI	Runs batted in
*	Also named Most Valuable Player
**Bold**	**Bold** denotes the player is in the Hall of Fame

== Winners ==
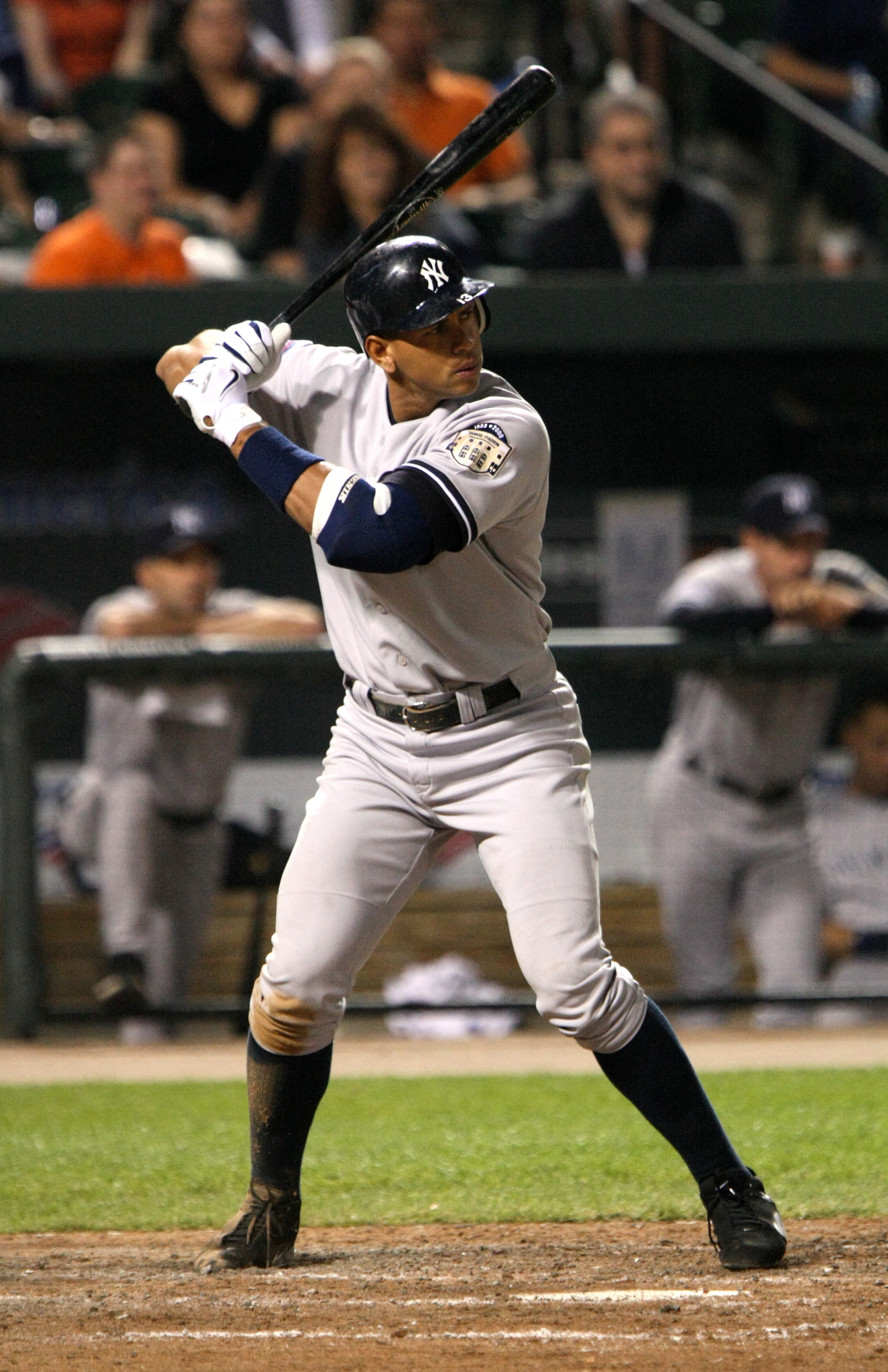
Alex Rodriguez won the award four times.

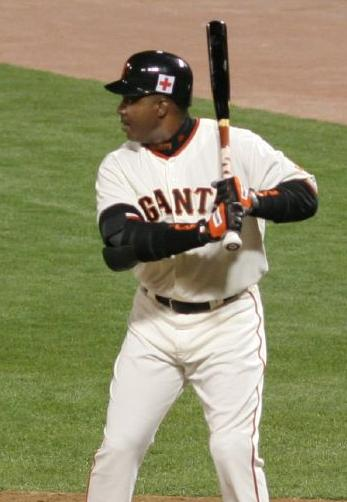
Barry Bonds won the award three times.

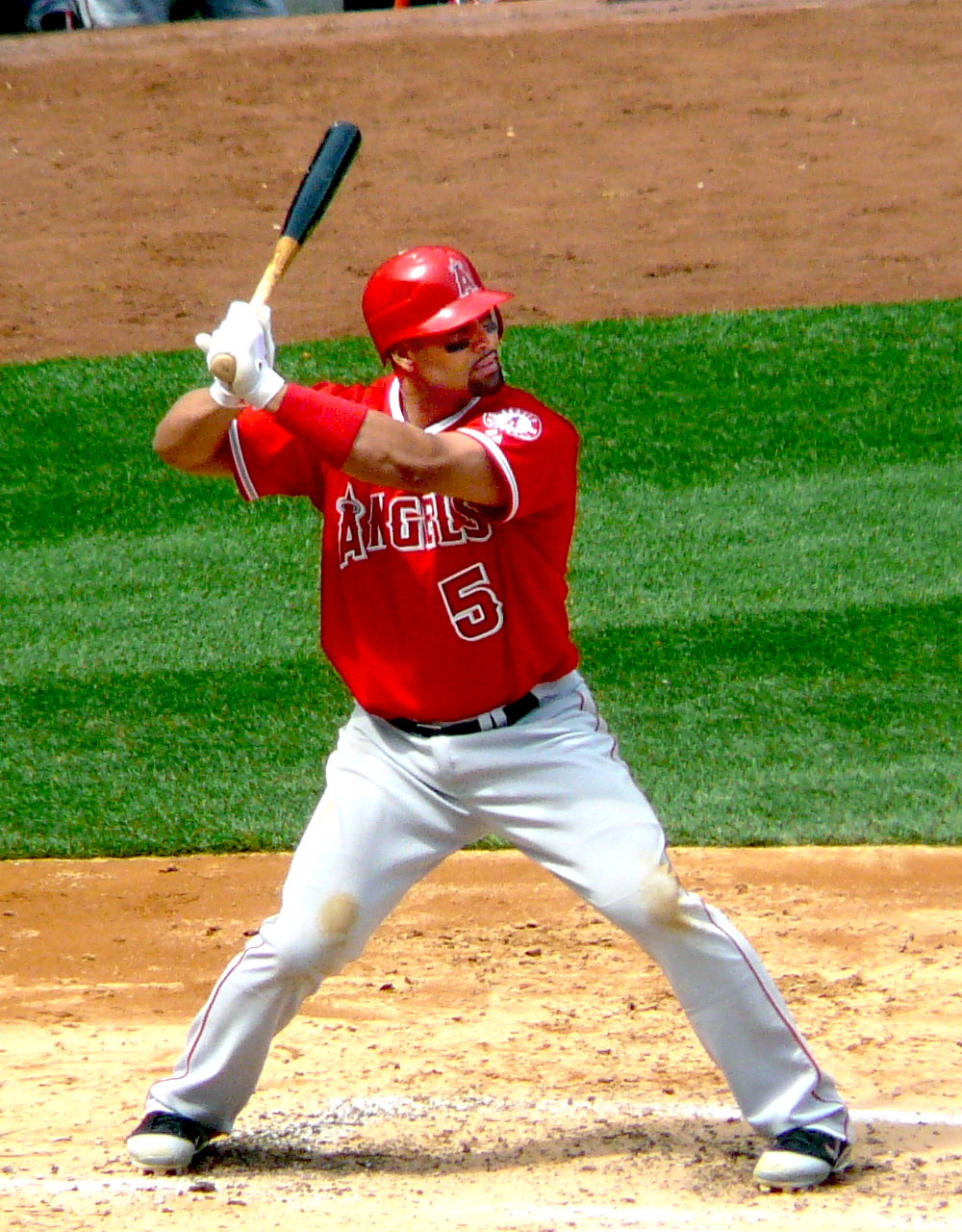
Albert Pujols won the award twice.

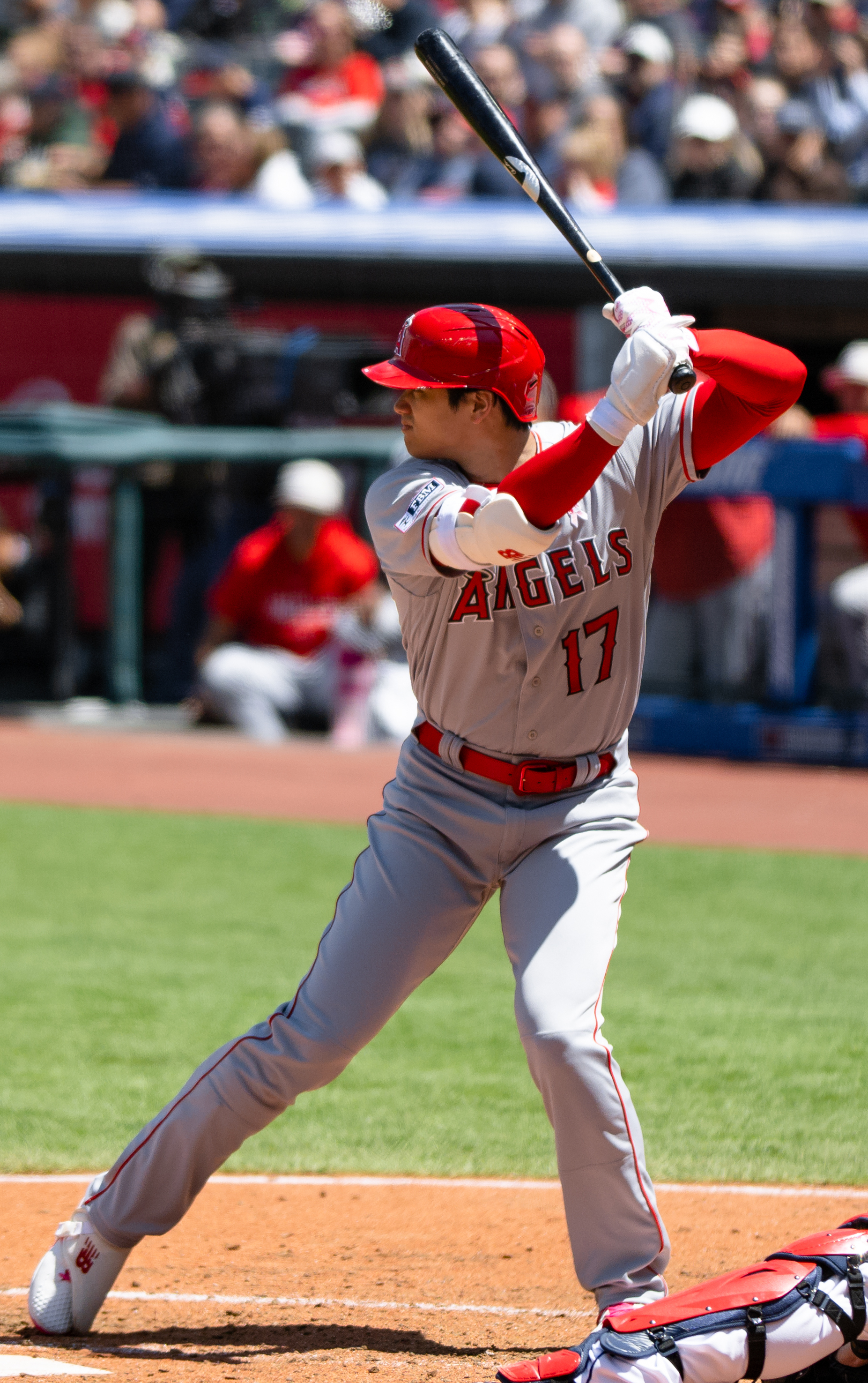
Shohei Ohtani is the only player to win in both leagues (with the Angels in 2023 and Dodgers in 2024 and 2025)

Year	League	Player	Team	Hits	HR	RBI
1999	American	Manny Ramirez	Cleveland Indians	174	44	165
1999	National	Sammy Sosa	Chicago Cubs	180	63	141
2000	American	Carlos Delgado	Toronto Blue Jays	196	41	137
2000	National	**Todd Helton**	Colorado Rockies	216	42	147
2001	American	Alex Rodriguez	Texas Rangers	201	52	135
2001	National	Barry Bonds*	San Francisco Giants	156	73	137
2002	American	Alex Rodriguez (2)	Texas Rangers	187	57	142
2002	National	Barry Bonds (2)*	San Francisco Giants	149	46	110
2003	American	Alex Rodriguez (3)*	Texas Rangers	181	47	118
2003	National	Albert Pujols	St. Louis Cardinals	212	43	124
2004	American	Manny Ramirez (2)	Boston Red Sox	175	43	130
2004	National	Barry Bonds (3)*	San Francisco Giants	135	45	101
2005	American	**David Ortiz**	Boston Red Sox	180	47	148
2005	National	**Andruw Jones**	Atlanta Braves	154	51	128
2006	American	**Derek Jeter**	New York Yankees	214	14	97
2006	National	Ryan Howard*	Philadelphia Phillies	182	58	149
2007	American	Alex Rodriguez (4)*	New York Yankees	183	54	156
2007	National	Prince Fielder	Milwaukee Brewers	165	50	119
2008	American	Kevin Youkilis	Boston Red Sox	168	29	115
2008	National	Aramis Ramírez	Chicago Cubs	160	27	111
2009	American	**Derek Jeter** (2)	New York Yankees	212	18	66
2009	National	Albert Pujols (2)*	St. Louis Cardinals	186	47	135
2010	American	José Bautista	Toronto Blue Jays	148	54	124
2010	National	Joey Votto*	Cincinnati Reds	177	37	113
2011	American	José Bautista (2)	Toronto Blue Jays	155	43	103
2011	National	Matt Kemp	Los Angeles Dodgers	195	39	126
2012	American	Miguel Cabrera*	Detroit Tigers	205	44	139
2012	National	Buster Posey*	San Francisco Giants	178	24	103
2013	American	Miguel Cabrera (2)*	Detroit Tigers	193	44	137
2013	National	Paul Goldschmidt	Arizona Diamondbacks	182	36	125
2014	American	Mike Trout*	Los Angeles Angels of Anaheim	173	36	111
2014	National	Giancarlo Stanton	Miami Marlins	155	37	105
2015	American	Josh Donaldson*	Toronto Blue Jays	184	41	123
2015	National	Bryce Harper*	Washington Nationals	172	42	99
2016	American	**David Ortiz** (2)	Boston Red Sox	169	38	127
2016	National	Kris Bryant*	Chicago Cubs	176	39	102
2017	American	Jose Altuve*	Houston Astros	204	24	81
2017	National	Giancarlo Stanton (2)*	Miami Marlins	168	59	132
2018	American	J. D. Martinez	Boston Red Sox	188	43	130
2018	National	Christian Yelich*	Milwaukee Brewers	187	36	110
2019	American	Mike Trout (2)*	Los Angeles Angels	137	45	104
2019	National	Christian Yelich (2)	Milwaukee Brewers	161	44	97
2020	American	José Abreu*	Chicago White Sox	76	19	60
2020	National	Freddie Freeman*	Atlanta Braves	73	13	53
2021	American	Vladimir Guerrero Jr.	Toronto Blue Jays	188	48	111
2021	National	Bryce Harper (2)*	Philadelphia Phillies	151	35	84
2022	American	Aaron Judge*	New York Yankees	177	62	131
2022	National	Paul Goldschmidt (2)*	St. Louis Cardinals	178	35	115
2023	American	Shohei Ohtani*	Los Angeles Angels	151	44	95
2023	National	Ronald Acuña Jr.*	Atlanta Braves	217	41	106
2024	American	Aaron Judge (2)*	New York Yankees	180	58	144
2024	National	Shohei Ohtani (2)*	Los Angeles Dodgers	197	54	130
2025	American	Aaron Judge (3)*	New York Yankees	179	53	114
2025	National	Shohei Ohtani (3)*	Los Angeles Dodgers	172	55	102
2026	American	Yordan Alvarez*	Houston Astros	179	42	106
2026	National	Pete Crow-Armstrong*	Chicago Cubs	175	45	107

== Multiple-time winners ==
15 players have won the award multiple times, with Alex Rodriguez (4 awards), Barry Bonds (3 awards), Aaron Judge (3 awards), and Shohei Ohtani (3 awards) being the only players to win more than twice. Ohtani is the only player to win in both the American and National League. David Ortiz won two awards 11 years apart (2005 and 2016), the largest gap of any player.

Player	# of Awards	Years
Alex Rodriguez	4	2001, 2002, 2003, 2007
Barry Bonds	3	2001, 2002, 2004
Aaron Judge	3	2022, 2024, 2025
Shohei Ohtani	3	2023, 2024, 2025
Manny Ramirez	2	1999, 2004
Albert Pujols	2	2003, 2009
David Ortiz	2	2005, 2016
Derek Jeter	2	2006, 2009
José Bautista	2	2010, 2011
Miguel Cabrera	2	2012, 2013
Paul Goldschmidt	2	2013, 2022
Giancarlo Stanton	2	2014, 2017
Mike Trout	2	2014, 2019
Bryce Harper	2	2015, 2021
Christian Yelich	2	2018, 2019

== See also ==
- Silver Slugger Award: given to the best offensive player at each position.
- Edgar Martínez Award: given to the best-designated hitter (DH) (American League).
- Major League Baseball Triple Crown
- This Year in Baseball Awards (including hitter)
- Baseball awards
- List of Major League Baseball awards
- Ted Williams Museum and Hitters Hall of Fame (including "500 Homerun Club" exhibit)
