= Okinawa Cellular Stadium =

Baseball stadium in Naha, Japan

Coordinates: 26°12′12.70″N 127°40′23.42″E

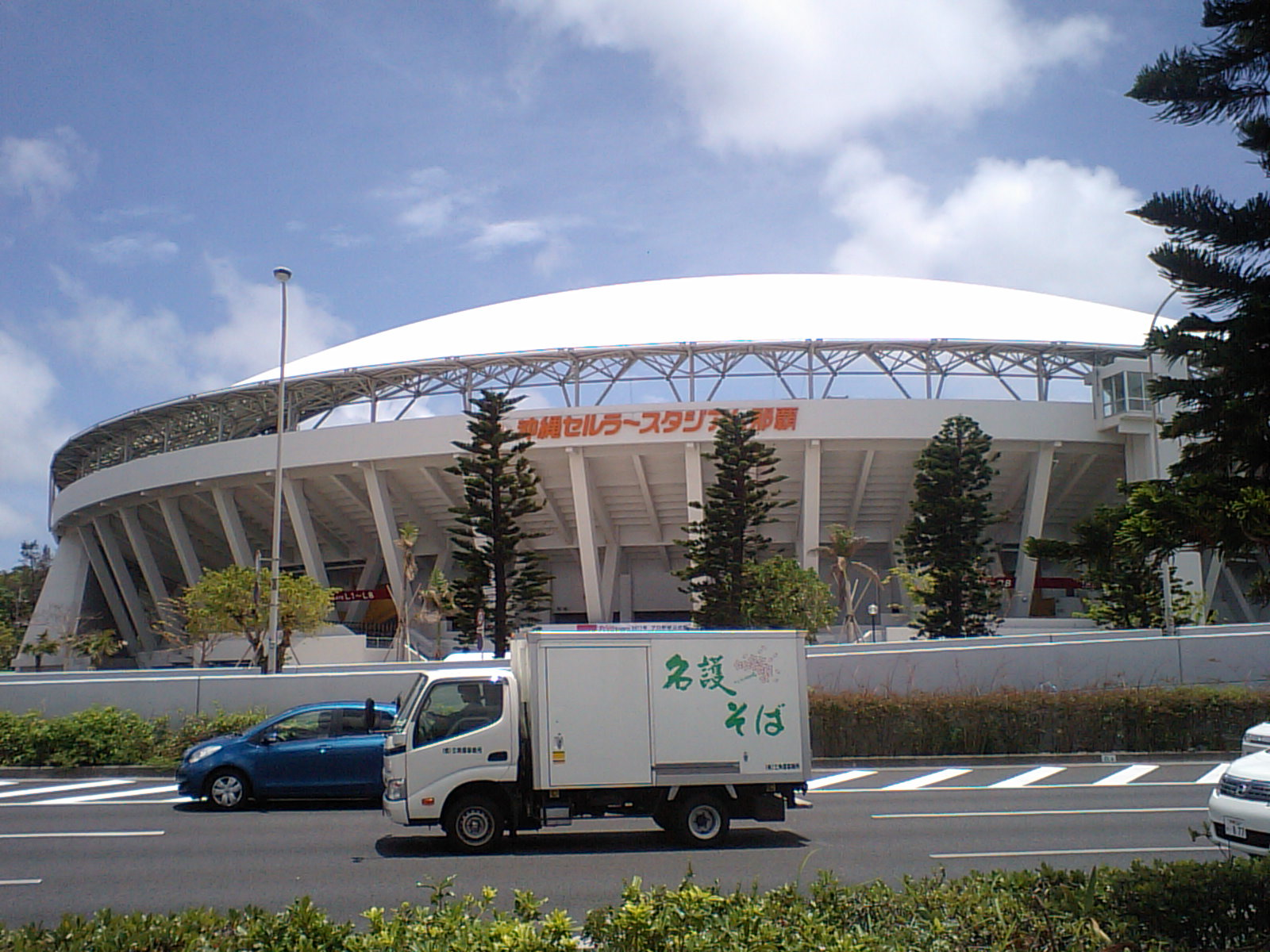
- Interactive map of Okinawa Cellular Stadium
- Location: Naha, Japan
- Owner: Naha City
- Capacity: 30,000

Construction
- Opened: June 1959
- Renovated: March 17, 2010

Okinawa Cellular Stadium, originally known as Naha City Ohnoyama Baseball Stadium, is a multi-purpose stadium in Naha, Japan. It is currently used mostly for baseball matches. The stadium was originally opened in 1959, but was renovated in 2010. It has a capacity of 30,000 spectators.
