= Venezuela national under-18 baseball team =

Venezuela Baseball U-18

Information
- Country: Venezuela
- Confederation: WBSC Americas

WBSC ranking
- Current: 5 (26 October 2026)

The Venezuela national under-18 baseball team is the national under-18 team representing Venezuela in international baseball competitions. The organization is currently ranked 6th in the world by the World Baseball Softball Confederation. They compete in the bi-annual U-18 Baseball World Cup.

== See also ==
- Venezuela national baseball team
- U-18 Baseball World Cup
