= China national under-18 baseball team =

China Baseball U-18

Information
- Country: China
- Confederation: WBSC Asia

WBSC ranking
- Current: 17 (31 December 2025)

The China national under-18 baseball team is the national under-18 team representing China in international baseball competitions. The organization is currently ranked 21st in the world by the World Baseball Softball Confederation. They compete in the bi-annual U-18 Baseball World Cup.

== See also ==
- China national baseball team
- U-18 Baseball World Cup
