= Panama national under-18 baseball team =

Panama Baseball U-18

Information
- Country: Panama
- Confederation: WBSC Americas

WBSC ranking
- Current: 9 (26 October 2026)

The Panama national under-18 baseball team is the national under-18 team representing Panama in international baseball competitions. The organization is currently ranked 13th in the world by the World Baseball Softball Confederation. They compete in the bi-annual U-18 Baseball World Cup.

== See also ==
- Panama national baseball team
- U-18 Baseball World Cup
