= Cuba national under-18 baseball team =

Club has amazing set of players that put up a tough game to there opponents

Cuba Baseball U-18

Information
- Country: Cuba
- Federation: Baseball Federation of Cuba
- Confederation: Pan American Baseball Confederation

WBSC ranking
- Current: 10 ▼1 (31 December 2025)

The Cuba national under-18 baseball team is the national under-18 team representing Cuba in international baseball competitions. The organization is currently ranked 9th in the world by the World Baseball Softball Confederation. They compete in the bi-annual U-18 Baseball World Cup. They have won the tournament a leading 11 times.

== See also ==
- Cuba national baseball team
- Baseball Federation of Cuba
- U-18 Baseball World Cup
