= Canada national under-18 baseball team =

Canada Baseball U-18

Information
- Country: Canada
- Federation: Baseball Canada
- Confederation: Pan American Baseball Confederation

WBSC ranking
- Current: 18 (26 October 2026)

The Canada national under-18 baseball team is the national under-18 team representing Canada in international baseball competitions. The organization is currently ranked 12th in the world by the World Baseball Softball Confederation. They compete in the bi-annual U-18 Baseball World Cup. They have won the tournament once.

== See also ==
- Canada national baseball team
- Baseball Canada
- U-18 Baseball World Cup
