= Chinese Taipei national under-18 baseball team =

Chinese Taipei Baseball U-18

Information
- Country: Taiwan (Representing Chinese Taipei)
- Federation: Baseball Federation of Taiwan
- Confederation: Baseball Federation of Asia

WBSC ranking
- Current: 2 (26 March 2026)

The Chinese Taipei national under-18 baseball team is the national under-18 team representing Taiwan (registered as Chinese Taipei) in international baseball competitions. The organization is currently ranked 2nd in the world by the World Baseball Softball Confederation. They compete in the bi-annual U-18 Baseball World Cup. They have won the tournament three times.

== See also ==
- Chinese Taipei national baseball team
- Chinese Taipei Baseball Association
- U-18 Baseball World Cup
