= Australia national under-18 baseball team =

Australia Baseball U-18

Information
- Country: Australia
- Federation: Australian Baseball Federation
- Confederation: Baseball Confederation of Oceania

WBSC ranking
- Current: 10 ▲1 (5 August 2025)

The Australia national under-18 baseball team is the national under-18 team representing Australia in international baseball competitions. The organization is currently ranked 10th in the world by the World Baseball Softball Confederation. They compete in the bi-annual U-18 Baseball World Cup. They have finished 2nd once and 3rd four times in the tournament.

== See also ==
- Australia national baseball team
- Australian Baseball Federation
- U-18 Baseball World Cup
