= South Korea national under-18 baseball team =

South Korea Baseball U-18

Information
- Country: South Korea
- Federation: Korea Baseball Association
- Confederation: Baseball Federation of Asia

WBSC ranking
- Current: 4 (26 October 2026)

The South Korea national under-18 baseball team is the national under-18 team representing South Korea in international baseball competitions. The organization is currently ranked 3rd in the world by the World Baseball Softball Confederation. They compete in the bi-annual U-18 Baseball World Cup. They have won the tournament five times.

== See also ==
- South Korea national baseball team
- Korea Baseball Association
- U-18 Baseball World Cup
