= U-18 Baseball World Cup =

Sports event

- Current season, competition or edition: 2025 U-18 Baseball World Cup
- Formerly: World Junior Baseball Championship (1981 - 2010); 18U Baseball World Championship (2012); 18U Baseball World Cup (2013)
- Sport: Baseball
- Founded: 1981
- No. of teams: 12
- Continent: International
- Most recent champion: United States (11th title) (2025)
- Most titles: United States; Cuba (11 titles each)
- Website: 2025 WBSC U-18 Baseball World Cup

The U-18 Baseball World Cup is the 18-and-under baseball world championship sanctioned by the International Baseball Federation (IBAF) and its successor, the World Baseball Softball Confederation (WBSC), and was first held in 1981 in the United States. Because it is a world championship, the results of the U-18 Baseball World Cup affect the WBSC World Rankings.

Several players who have participated in the U-18 Baseball World Cup have gone on to stardom at the professional level, including Japan's Yu Darvish, USA's Clayton Kershaw, Francisco Lindor and Buster Posey, and Cuba's Yasiel Puig and Aroldis Chapman, among many others.

Prior to 2010, the IBAF organized the World Junior Baseball Championship. The WBSC was created in 2013 when the IBAF merged with the International Softball Federation.

== Classification ==
With the approved format of 12 national teams, the WBSC has distributed the continental quotas as follows:

- WBSC Africa: 1 spots
- WBSC Americas: 4 spots
- WBSC Asia: 3 spots
- WBSC Europe: 2 spots
- WBSC Oceania: 1 spots
- Wild cards: 1 spots (including hosts if necessary)

The participants will be determined through the continental championships.

== Results ==
Ed.	Years	Hosts	Finalists			Semi-finalists			Teams
Ed.	Years	Hosts	Champions	Score	Runners-up	3rd place	Score	4th place	Teams
World Junior Baseball Championship
1	1981; Details	(United States); Newark	South Korea	9 – 7	United States	Australia		Venezuela	11
2	1982; Details	(United States); Knoxville	United States	10 – 4	Japan	Australia			?
3	1983; Details	(United States); Johnstown	Chinese Taipei		United States	Canada			?
4	1984; Details	(Canada); Saskatoon	Cuba		United States	Chinese Taipei		Panama	10
5	1985; Details	(United States); Albany	Cuba	4 – 1	United States	Chinese Taipei		Venezuela	8
6	1986; Details	(Canada); Windsor	Cuba	13 – 0	Chinese Taipei	United States		Canada	7
7	1987; Details	(Canada); Windsor	Cuba	6 – 5	United States	Canada		Chinese Taipei	7
8	1988; Details	(Australia); Sydney	United States	8 – 1	Cuba	Chinese Taipei		Australia	8
9	1989; Details	(Canada); Trois-Rivières	United States	11 – 3	Cuba	Australia		Chinese Taipei	12
10	1990; Details	Cuba	Cuba		Chinese Taipei	United States		Venezuela	10
11	1991; Details	(Canada); Brandon	Canada	5 – 2	Chinese Taipei	United States		Australia	10
12	1992; Details	(Mexico); Monterrey	Cuba	6 – 1	United States	Chinese Taipei		Mexico	21
13	1993; Details	(Canada); Windsor	Cuba	5 – 1	United States	Chinese Taipei		Canada	8
14	1994; Details	(Canada); Brandon	South Korea	11 – 10	United States	Chinese Taipei		Brazil	10
15	1995; Details	(United States); Cape Cod	United States	10 – 0	Chinese Taipei	Australia		South Korea	8
16	1996; Details	(Cuba); Sancti Spíritus	Cuba	6 – 5	Chinese Taipei	United States		South Korea	10
17	1997; Details	(Canada); Moncton	Cuba	7 – 3	Chinese Taipei	Canada		United States	11
18	1999; Details	(Taiwan); Kaohsiung	United States	10 – 9	Chinese Taipei	Cuba		Panama	12
19	2000; Details	(Canada); Edmonton	South Korea	9 – 7	United States	Cuba		Australia	12
20	2002; Details	(Canada); Sherbrooke	Cuba	9 – 6	Chinese Taipei	United States		Canada	12
21	2004; Details	(Taiwan); Taipei	Cuba	4 – 0	Japan	South Korea		United States	11
22	2006; Details	(Cuba); Sancti Spíritus	South Korea	4 – 3	United States	Canada		Mexico	12
23	2008; Details	(Canada); Edmonton	South Korea	7 – 0	United States	Cuba	6 – 2	Australia	12
24	2010; Details	(Canada); Thunder Bay	Chinese Taipei	8 – 4	Australia	Cuba	8 – 2	Canada	12
18U Baseball World Championship
25	2012; Details	(South Korea); Seoul	United States	6 – 2	Canada	Chinese Taipei	4 – 1	Colombia	12
18U Baseball World Cup
26	2013; Details	(Taiwan); Taichung	United States	3 – 2	Japan	Cuba	6 – 1	Chinese Taipei	12
U-18 Baseball World Cup
27	2015; Details	(Japan); Osaka	United States	2 – 1	Japan	South Korea	8 – 5	Australia	12
28	2017; Details	(Canada); Thunder Bay	United States	8 – 0	South Korea	Japan	8 – 1	Canada	12
29	2019; Details	(South Korea); Gijang	Chinese Taipei	2 – 1	United States	South Korea	6 – 5	Australia	12
30	2022; Details (Note: Originally scheduled to be held in 2021, but due to the COVID-19 pandemic, postponed to September 2022.)	(United States); Sarasota & Bradenton	United States	5 – 1	Chinese Taipei	Japan	6 – 2	South Korea	12
31	2023; Details	(Taiwan); Taipei & Taichung	Japan	2 – 1	Chinese Taipei	South Korea	4 – 0	United States	12
32	2025; Details	(Japan); Naha & Itoman	United States	2 – 0	Japan	Chinese Taipei	3 – 2	South Korea	12
33	2027; Details	(China); Pingtan							12

== Medal table ==
Rank	Nation	Gold	Silver	Bronze	Total
1	United States	11	12	5	28
2	Cuba	11	2	5	18
3	South Korea	5	1	4	10
4	Chinese Taipei	3	10	8	21
5	Japan	1	5	2	8
6	Canada	1	1	4	6
7	Australia	0	1	4	5
Totals (7 entries)		32	32	32	96

- Chinese Taipei is the official WBSC designation for the team representing the state officially referred to as the Republic of China, more commonly known as Taiwan. (See also political status of Taiwan for details.)

== See also ==
- Baseball awards#World
- International Baseball Federation
- World Baseball Softball Confederation
