= List of Kansas City Royals first-round draft picks =

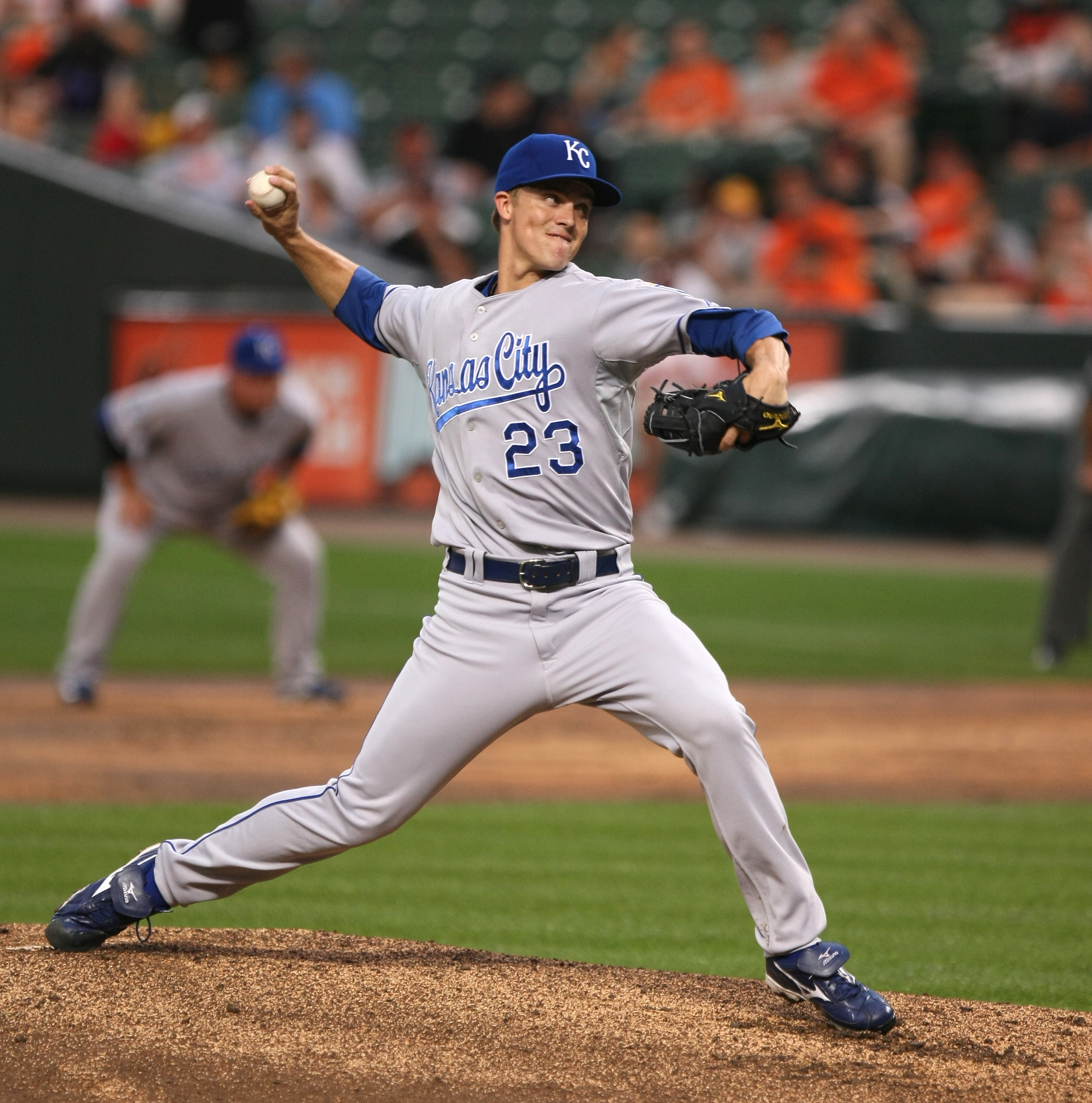
Zack Greinke, drafted in 2002, is the only Royals' first-round pick to win a Cy Young Award with the team.

The Kansas City Royals are a Major League Baseball franchise based in Kansas City, Missouri. The franchise, founded in 1969, plays in the American League Central division. Since the institution of Major League Baseball's Rule 4 Draft, the Royals have selected 57 players in the first round. Officially known as the "First-Year Player Draft", the Rule 4 Draft is Major League Baseball's primary mechanism for assigning amateur players from high schools, colleges, and other amateur baseball clubs to its franchises. The draft order is determined based on the previous season's standings with the team that had the worst record receiving the first pick. In addition, teams that lost free agents in the previous off-season may be awarded compensatory or supplementary picks. The First-Year Player Draft is unrelated to the 1968 expansion draft in which the Royals initially filled their roster.

Of the 57 players first-round draft picks, 31 have been pitchers, the most of any position; 20 of these were right-handed, while 11 were left-handed. Twelve outfielders were selected, and eight shortstops, three catchers, and two third basemen were taken. The team also selected one player at first base, but has never drafted a second baseman. Fifteen of the players came from institutions in the state of California, while Florida and Texas follow with seven players each. The Royals have drafted two players, Luke Hochevar (2006) and Aaron Crow (2009), who were playing in the American Association of Independent Professional Baseball draft. Both had been drafted previously by other major league teams but had chosen to play for the Fort Worth Cats instead. They have also drafted one player from Puerto Rico: Juan Lebron (1995).

Seven of their first-round picks have won World Series championships with the team. Outfielder Willie Wilson (1974) and shortstop Buddy Biancalana (1978) appeared during the Royals' 1985 World Series victory, while Alex Gordon (2005), Luke Hochevar (2006), Mike Moustakas (2007), Eric Hosmer (2008) and Christian Colón (2010) were all part of the winning team in the 2015 World Series. Zack Greinke (2002) is the only first-round pick of the Royals to earn a Cy Young Award with the team, winning in 2009. Royals' first-round picks have never won Rookie of the Year or Most Valuable Player awards, and no pick has been elected to the Hall of Fame. The Royals have made seven selections in the supplemental round of the draft. They have made the first overall selection in the draft once, in 2006. The club has had 13 compensatory picks since the institution of the First-Year Player Draft in 1965. These additional picks are provided when a team loses a particularly valuable free agent in the prior off-season,^{[V]} or, more recently, if a team fails to sign a draft pick from the previous year. The Royals' first-ever pick, John Simmons (1969), did not sign with the club but they received no compensatory pick.

== Key ==
Year	Links to an article about that year's Major League Baseball draft
Position	Indicates the secondary/collegiate position at which the player was drafted, rather than the professional position the player may have gone on to play
Organization (Location)	Indicates the previous high school, university, or other organization the player was drafted from
Pick	Indicates the number of the pick
*	Player did not sign with the Royals
§	Indicates a supplemental pick
'85	Player was a member of Royals' 1985 championship team
'15	Player was a member of Royals' 2015 championship team

== Picks ==
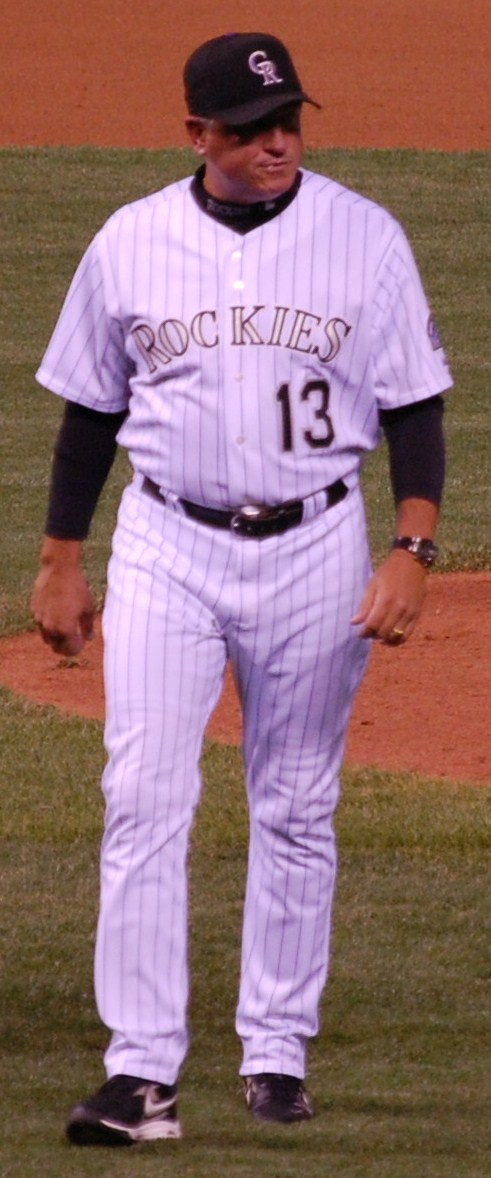
Clint Hurdle (1975) was the first player drafted by the Royals in the first round from Florida, a state which has produced seven first-rounders for the Royals overall.

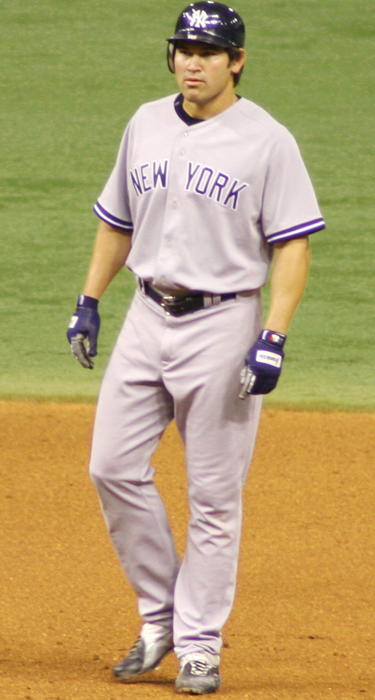
Johnny Damon was the last of four first-round picks by the Royals in 1992 and went on to win World Series championships with the Boston Red Sox and New York Yankees.

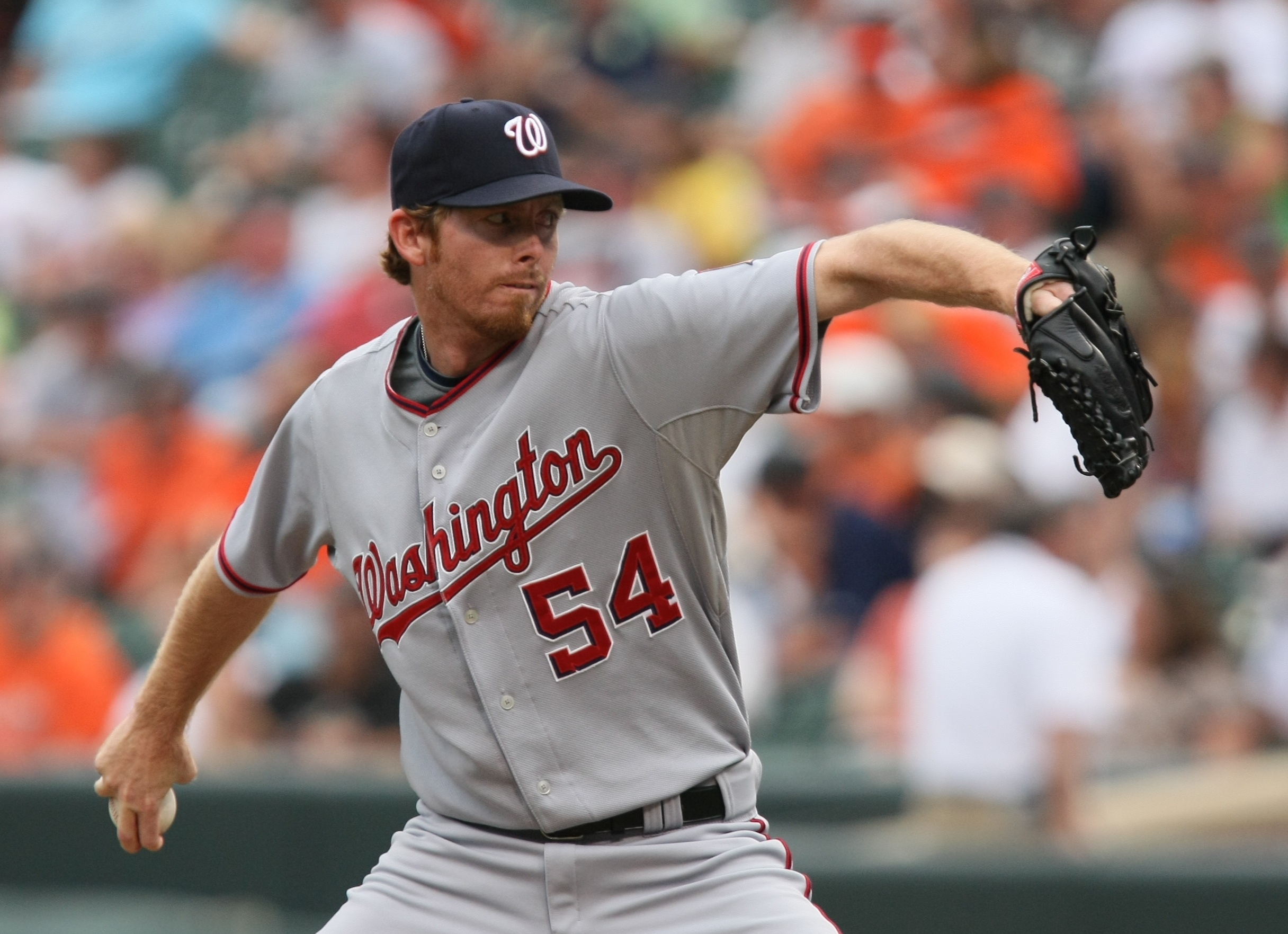
Mike MacDougal was one of two right-handed pitchers from the state of North Carolina taken by the Royals in the first round of the 1999 draft.

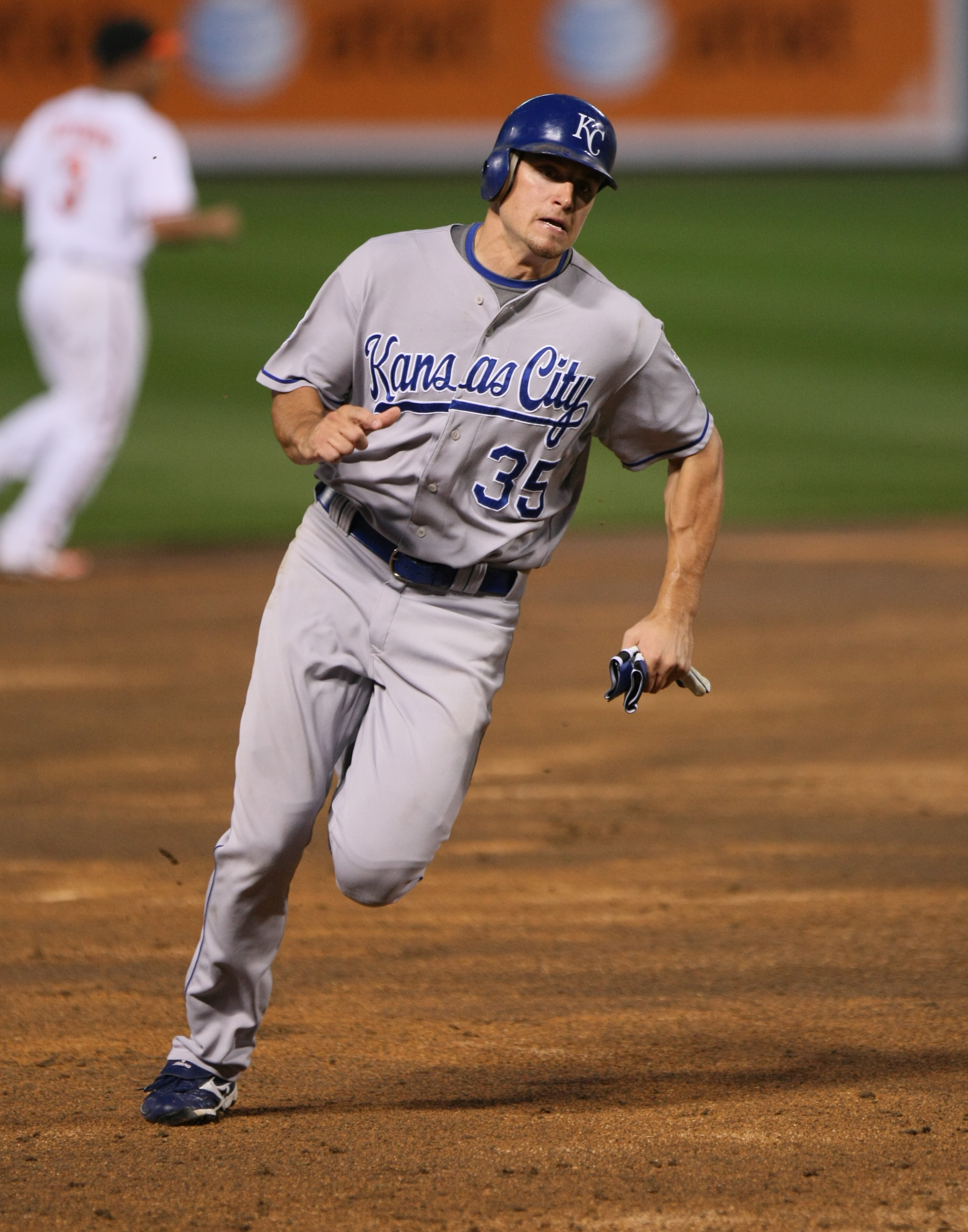
Mitch Maier (2003) was one of three catchers ever drafted by the Royals in the first round of the First-Year Player Draft.

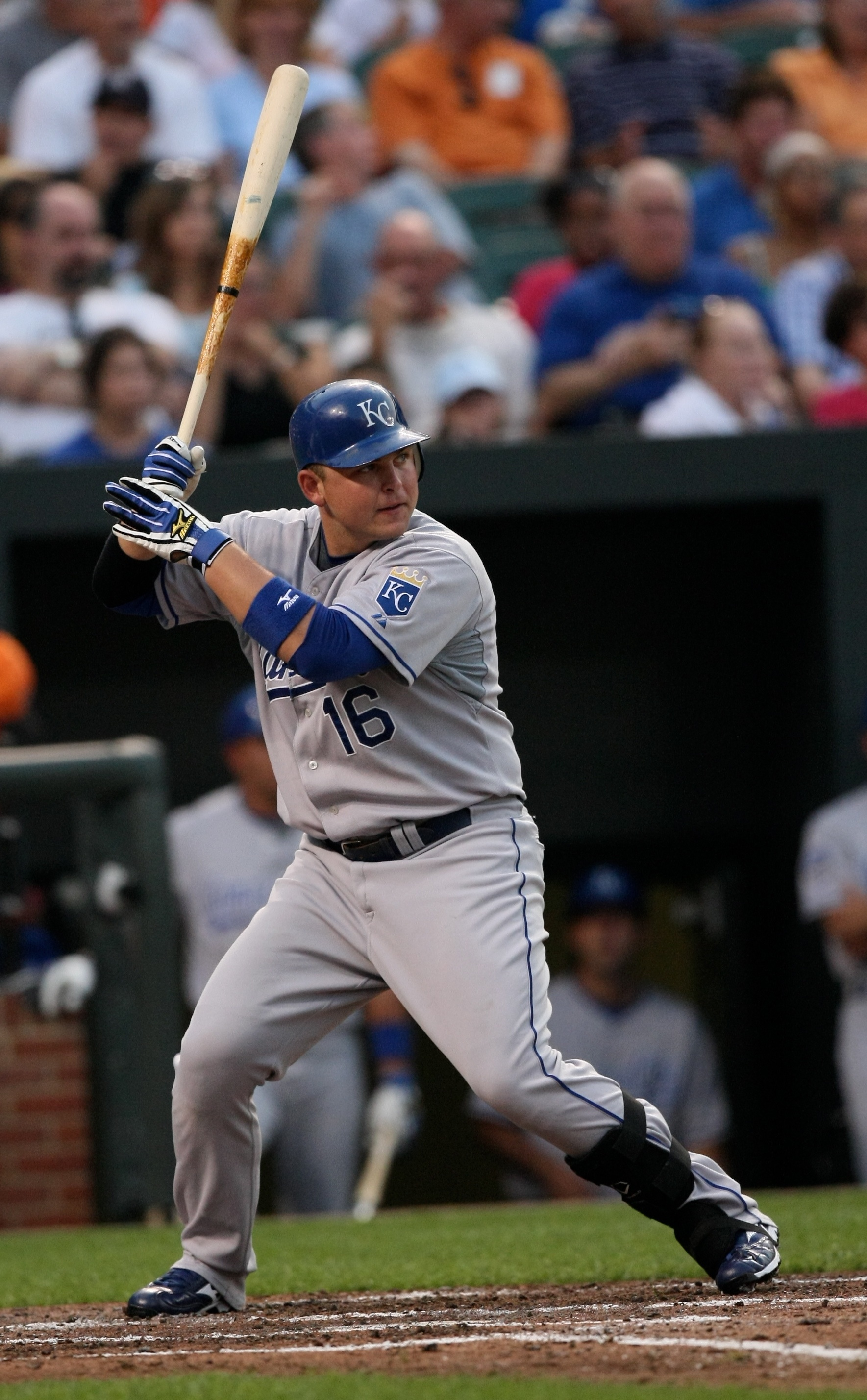
Billy Butler (2004) was one of two third basemen taken by the Royals in the first round.

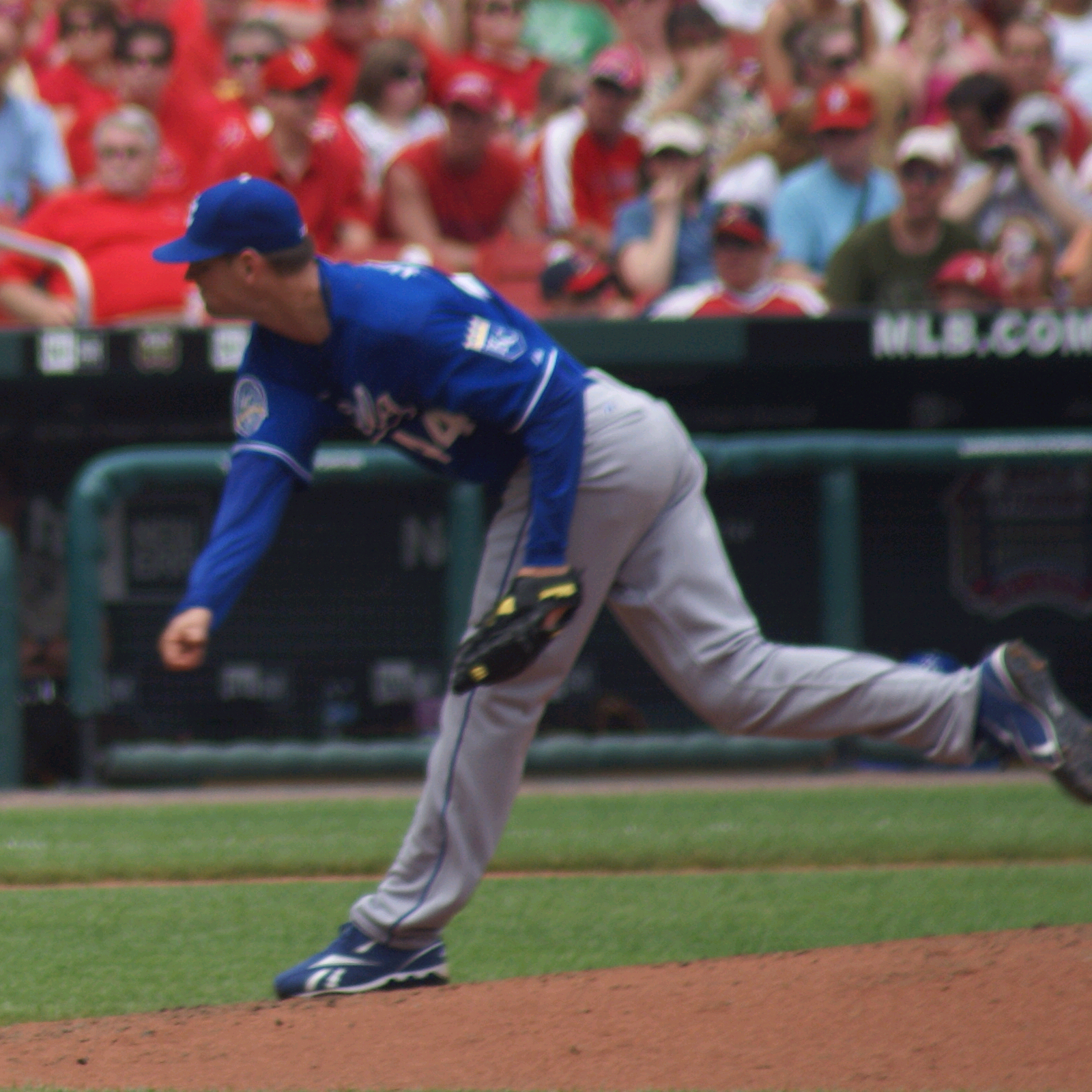
Luke Hochevar (2006) is one of two players the Royals have drafted in the first round from the Fort Worth Cats and was selected with their only first overall pick.

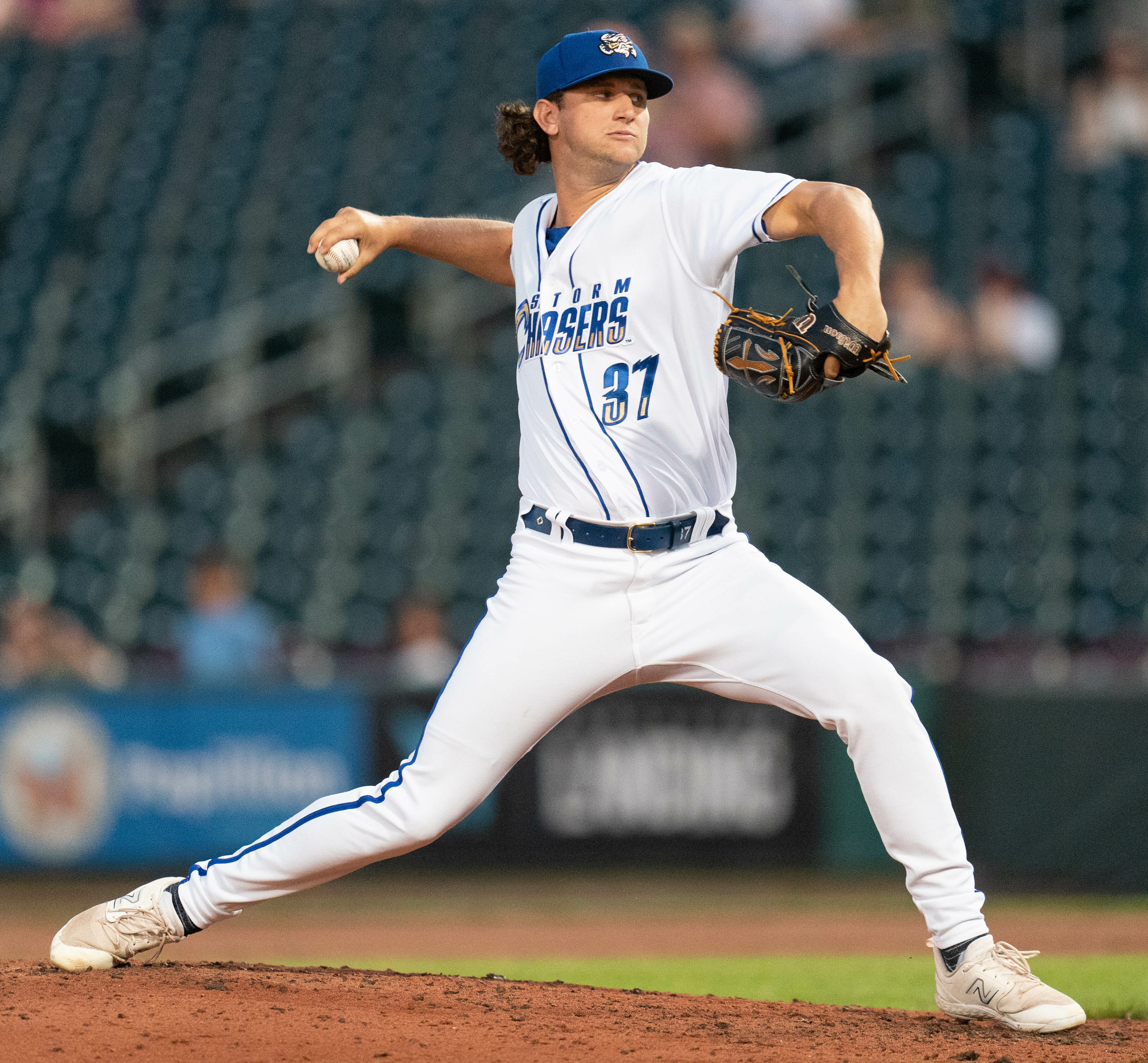
Jackson Kowar was the second of two pitchers the Royals selected from the University of Florida in the first round in 2018.

Year	Name	Position	Organization (Location)	Pick	Ref
1969	John Simmons*	Shortstop	Childersburg High School (Childersburg, Alabama)	23	
1970	Rex Goodson	Catcher	Pine Tree High School (Longview, Texas)	8	
1971	Roy Branch	Right-handed pitcher	Beaumont High School (St. Louis, Missouri)	5	
1972	Jamie Quirk '85	Shortstop	St. Paul High School (Whittier, California)	18	
1973	Lew Olsen	Right-handed pitcher	San Ramon Valley High School (Danville, California)	9	
1974	Willie Wilson '85	Outfielder	Summit High School (Summit, New Jersey)	15	
1975	Clint Hurdle	Outfielder	Merritt Island High School (Merritt Island, Florida)	9	
1976	Ben Grzybek	Right-handed pitcher	Hialeah High School (Hialeah, Florida)	18	
1977	Mike Jones	Left-handed pitcher	Sunderland High School (Pittsford, New York)	21	
1978	Buddy Biancalana '85	Shortstop	Redwood High School (Greenbrae, California)	25	
1979	Atlee Hammaker	Left-handed pitcher	East Tennessee State University (Johnson City, Tennessee)	21	
1980	Frank Wills	Right-handed pitcher	Tulane University (New Orleans, Louisiana)	16	
1981	Dave Leeper	Outfielder	University of Southern California (Los Angeles, California)	23	
1982	John Morris	Outfielder	Seton Hall University (South Orange, New Jersey)	10	
1983	Gary Thurman	Outfielder	North Central High School (Indianapolis, Indiana)	21	
1984	Scott Bankhead	Right-handed pitcher	University of North Carolina at Chapel Hill (Chapel Hill, North Carolina)	16	
1985	Brian McRae	Shortstop	Manatee High School (Bradenton, Florida)	17	
1986	Tony Clements	Shortstop	Don Antonio Lugo High School (Chino, California)	24	
1987	Kevin Appier	Right-handed pitcher	Antelope Valley College (Lancaster, California)	9	
1988	Hugh Walker	Outfielder	Jacksonville High School (Jacksonville, Arkansas)	18	
1989	Brent Mayne	Catcher	California State University, Fullerton (Fullerton, California)	13	
1990	no first-round pick^{[a]}				
1991	Joe Vitiello	Outfielder	University of Alabama (Tuscaloosa, Alabama)	7	
1991	Jason Pruitt	Right-handed pitcher	Rockingham County High School (Wentworth, North Carolina)	30^{§}^{[b]}	
1992	Michael Tucker	Shortstop	Longwood College (Farmville, Virginia)	10	
1992	Jim Pittsley	Right-handed pitcher	DuBois Area High School (DuBois, Pennsylvania)	17^{[c]}	
1992	Sherard Clinkscales	Right-handed pitcher	Purdue University (West Lafayette, Indiana)	31^{§}^{[d]}	
1992	Johnny Damon	Outfielder	Dr. Phillips High School (Orlando, Florida)	35^{§}^{[e]}	
1993	Jeff Granger	Left-handed pitcher	Texas A&M University (College Station, Texas)	5	
1994	Matt Smith	Left-handed pitcher	Grants Pass High School (Grants Pass, Oregon)	16	
1995	Juan Lebron	Outfielder	Carmen Bozello Huyke High School (Arroyo, Puerto Rico)	22	
1996	Dee Brown	Outfielder	Marlboro Central High School (Marlboro, New York)	14	
1997	Dan Reichert	Right-handed pitcher	University of the Pacific (Stockton, California)	7	
1998	Jeff Austin	Right-handed pitcher	Stanford University (Stanford, California)	4	
1998	Matt Burch	Right-handed pitcher	Virginia Commonwealth University (Richmond, Virginia)	30^{[f]}	
1998	Chris George	Left-handed pitcher	Klein High School (Spring, Texas)	31^{§}^{[g]}	
1999	Kyle Snyder	Right-handed pitcher	University of North Carolina at Chapel Hill (Chapel Hill, North Carolina)	7	
1999	Mike MacDougal	Right-handed pitcher	Wake Forest University (Winston-Salem, North Carolina)	25^{[h]}	
1999	Jay Gehrke	Right-handed pitcher	Pepperdine University (Malibu, California)	32^{§}^{[i]}	
1999	Jimmy Gobble	Left-handed pitcher	John S. Battle High School (Bristol, Virginia)	43^{§}^{[j]}	
2000	Mike Stodolka	Left-handed pitcher	Centennial High School (Corona, California)	4	
2001	Colt Griffin	Right-handed pitcher	Marshall High School (Marshall, Texas)	9	
2002	Zack Greinke	Right-handed pitcher	Apopka High School (Apopka, Florida)	6	
2003	Chris Lubanski	Outfielder	Kennedy–Kenrick Catholic High School (Norristown, Pennsylvania)	5	
2003	Mitch Maier	Catcher	University of Toledo (Toledo, Ohio)	30^{[k]}	
2004	Billy Butler	Third baseman	Wolfson High School (Jacksonville, Florida)	14	
2004	Matthew Campbell	Left-handed pitcher	University of South Carolina (Columbia, South Carolina)	29^{[l]}	
2004	J. P. Howell	Left-handed pitcher	University of Texas at Austin (Austin, Texas)	31^{§}^{[m]}	
2005	Alex Gordon '15	Third baseman	University of Nebraska–Lincoln (Lincoln, Nebraska)	2	
2006	Luke Hochevar '15	Right-handed pitcher	Fort Worth Cats (Fort Worth, Texas)	1	
2007	Mike Moustakas '15	Shortstop	Chatsworth High School (Chatsworth, California)	2	
2008	Eric Hosmer '15	First baseman	American Heritage School (Plantation, Florida)	3	
2008	Mike Montgomery	Left-handed pitcher	Hart High School (Newhall, California)	36^{[n]}	
2009	Aaron Crow	Right-handed pitcher	Fort Worth Cats (Fort Worth, Texas)	12	
2010	Christian Colon '15	Shortstop	California State University, Fullerton (Fullerton, California)	4	
2011	Bubba Starling	Outfielder	Gardner Edgerton High School (Gardner, Kansas)	5	
2012	Kyle Zimmer	Right-handed pitcher	University of San Francisco (San Francisco, California)	5	
2013	Hunter Dozier	Shortstop	Stephen F. Austin State University (Nacogdoches, Texas)	8	
2013	Sean Manaea	Left-handed pitcher	Indiana State University (Terre Haute, Indiana)	34^{§}^{[o]}	
2014	Brandon Finnegan	Left-handed pitcher	Texas Christian University (Fort Worth, TX)	17	
2014	Foster Griffin	Left-handed pitcher	The First Academy (Orlando, Florida)	28^{§}	
2014	Chase Vallot	catcher	St. Thomas More High School (Lafayette, Louisiana)	40^{§}	
2015	Ashe Russell	Right-handed pitcher	Cathedral High School (Indianapolis, Indiana)	21	
2015	Nolan Watson	Right-handed pitcher	Lawrence North High School (Indianapolis, Indiana)	33^{§}	
2016	no first-round pick^{[o]}				N/A
2017	Nick Pratto	First baseman	Huntington Beach High School (Huntington Beach, California)	14	
2018	Brady Singer	Right-handed pitcher	University of Florida (Gainesville, Florida)	18	
2018	Jackson Kowar	Right-handed pitcher	University of Florida (Gainesville, Florida)	33^{§}	
2018	Daniel Lynch	Left-handed pitcher	University of Virginia (Charlottesville, Virginia)	34^{§}	
2019	Bobby Witt Jr.	Shortstop	Colleyville Heritage High School (Colleyville, Texas)	2	
2020	Asa Lacy	Left-handed pitcher	Texas A&M University (College Station, Texas)	4	
2021	Frank Mozzicato	Left-handed pitcher	East Catholic High School (Manchester, Connecticut)	7	
2022	Gavin Cross	Outfielder	Virginia Tech (Blacksburg, Virginia)	9	
2023	Blake Mitchell	Catcher	Sinton High School (Sinton, Texas)	8	
2024	Jac Caglianone	Left-handed pitcher / First baseman	University of Florida (Gainesville, Florida)	6	
2025	Sean Gamble	Outfielder	IMG Academy (Bradenton, Florida)	23	
2025	Josh Hammond	Third baseman	Wesleyan Christian Academy (High Point, North Carolina)	28^{§}	
2026	Zion Rose	Outfielder	Louisville (Louisville, Kentucky)	6	
2026	Taylor Rabe	Right-handed pitcher	Ole Miss (Oxford, Mississippi)	30^{§}	

== See also ==
- Kansas City Royals minor league players

== Footnotes ==
- ^{V} Through the 2012 draft, free agents were evaluated by the Elias Sports Bureau and rated "Type A", "Type B", or not compensation-eligible. If a team offered arbitration to a player but that player refused and subsequently signed with another team, the original team was able to receive additional draft picks. If a "Type A" free agent left in this way, his previous team received a supplemental pick and a compensatory pick from the team with which he signed. If a "Type B" free agent left in this way, his previous team received only a supplemental pick. Since the 2013 draft, free agents are no longer classified by type; instead, compensatory picks are only awarded if the team offered its free agent a contract worth at least the average of the 125 current richest MLB contracts. However, if the free agent's last team acquired the player in a trade during the last year of his contract, it is ineligible to receive compensatory picks for that player.
- ^{a} The Royals lost their first-round pick in 1990 to the San Diego Padres as compensation for signing free agent Mark Davis.
- ^{b} The Royals gained a supplemental first-round pick in 1991 for losing free agent Steve Farr.
- ^{c} The Royals gained a compensatory first-round pick in 1992 from the San Diego Padres for losing free agent Kurt Stillwell.
- ^{d} The Royals gained a supplemental first-round pick in 1992 for losing free agent Danny Tartabull.
- ^{e} The Royals gained a supplemental first-round pick in 1992 for losing free agent Kurt Stillwell.
- ^{f} The Royals gained a compensatory first-round pick in 1998 from the Arizona Diamondbacks for losing free agent Jay Bell.
- ^{g} The Royals gained a supplemental first-round pick in 1998 for losing free agent Jay Bell.
- ^{h} The Royals gained a compensatory first-round pick in 1999 from the Boston Red Sox for losing free agent José Offerman.
- ^{i} The Royals gained a supplemental first-round pick in 1999 for losing free agent José Offerman.
- ^{j} The Royals gained a supplemental first-round pick in 1999 for losing free agent Dean Palmer.
- ^{k} The Royals gained a compensatory first-round pick in 2003 from the Atlanta Braves for losing free agent Paul Byrd.
- ^{l} The Royals gained a compensatory first-round pick in 2004 from the San Francisco Giants for losing free agent Michael Tucker.
- ^{m} The Royals gained a supplemental first-round pick in 2004 for losing free agent Raúl Ibañez.
- ^{n} The Royals gained a compensatory first-round pick in 2008 from the Milwaukee Brewers for losing free agent David Riske.
- ^{o} The Royals gained an extra first-round pick in 2013 as a result of the 2012 Competitive Balance Lottery.
