= 2026 Major League Baseball draft =

Major League Baseball Draft

General information
- Sport: Baseball
- Date: July 11–12, 2026
- Location: Pennsylvania Convention Center; Philadelphia, Pennsylvania
- Networks: MLB Network (first three rounds); NBC (first ten picks); MLB.com

Overview
- 613 total selections in 20 rounds
- League: Major League Baseball
- First selection: Roch Cholowsky; Chicago White Sox
- First round selections: 38

The 2026 Major League Baseball draft took place on July 11–12, 2026, in Philadelphia, Pennsylvania. The draft assigns amateur baseball players from the United States, Canada, and Puerto Rico to Major League Baseball (MLB) teams.

The first six selections were set via a lottery, with first round picks belonging to the remaining lottery participants set in reverse order of regular season winning percentage. To complete the first round, playoff teams are in an order that combines postseason finish, revenue sharing status, and reverse order of winning percentage. Reverse order of regular season winning percentage and postseason finish will be used to set the draft order for rounds two through 20.

The Chicago White Sox won the draft lottery and the first overall selection. The Atlanta Braves and Houston Astros were awarded a Prospect Promotion Incentive Pick after Drake Baldwin won the NL Rookie of the Year and Hunter Brown finished in the top three for AL Cy Young.

== Draft lottery ==
The 2026 MLB Draft Lottery was held on December 9, 2025, in Orlando, Florida, during the Winter Meetings. The Colorado Rockies, Washington Nationals and Los Angeles Angels were ineligible to participate in the lottery, as per a rule in the collective bargaining agreement between Major League Baseball (MLB) and MLB Players Association that limits teams in larger markets from winning draft lottery picks in consecutive seasons, as well as limits teams in smaller markets from winning draft lottery picks three seasons in a row. The following table lists the percentage chances for each seed to receive lottery picks as a result of the draft lottery.

Denotes lottery winner
Denotes team that did not win lottery
Ineligible to receive lottery pick

Seed	Team	1st	2nd	3rd	4th	5th	6th
1	Chicago White Sox	27.7%					
2	Minnesota Twins	22.2%					
3	Pittsburgh Pirates	16.8%					
4	Baltimore Orioles	9.2%					
5	Athletics	6.5%					
6	Atlanta Braves	4.5%					
7	Tampa Bay Rays	3.0%					
8	St. Louis Cardinals	2.3%					
9	Miami Marlins	1.8%					
N/A	Colorado Rockies	∅					
N/A	Washington Nationals	∅					
N/A	Los Angeles Angels	∅					
10	Arizona Diamondbacks	1.5%					
11	Texas Rangers	1.3%					
12	San Francisco Giants	1.0%					
13	Kansas City Royals	0.8%					
14	New York Mets	0.6%					
15	Houston Astros	0.3%					

== Draft selections ==
Key
	All-Star
*	Player did not sign

=== First round ===
The Blue Jays, Dodgers, Mets, Phillies, and Yankees exceeded the second competitive-balance tax threshold, which means their first pick will get moved down 10 spots.

Pick	Player	Team	Position	School
1	Roch Cholowsky	Chicago White Sox	Shortstop	UCLA
2	Grady Emerson	Tampa Bay Rays	Shortstop	Fort Worth Christian School (TX)
3	Vahn Lackey	Minnesota Twins	Catcher	Georgia Tech
4	Jackson Flora	San Francisco Giants	Pitcher	UC Santa Barbara
5	Derek Curiel	Pittsburgh Pirates	Outfielder	LSU
6	Zion Rose	Kansas City Royals	Outfielder	Louisville
7	Eric Booth Jr.	Baltimore Orioles	Outfielder	Oak Grove High School (MS)
8	Drew Burress	Athletics	Outfielder	Georgia Tech
9	AJ Gracia	Atlanta Braves	Outfielder	Virginia
10	Tyler Bell	Colorado Rockies	Shortstop	Kentucky
11	Chris Hacopian	Washington Nationals	Second baseman	Texas A&M
12	Jared Grindlinger	Los Angeles Angels	Outfielder	Huntington Beach High School (CA)
13	Trevor Condon	St. Louis Cardinals	Outfielder	Etowah High School (GA)
14	Jacob Lombard	Miami Marlins	Shortstop	Gulliver Preparatory School (FL)
15	Ryder Helfrick	Arizona Diamondbacks	Catcher	Arkansas
16	Gio Rojas	Texas Rangers	Pitcher	Marjory Stoneman Douglas High School (FL)
17	Logan Hughes	Houston Astros	Outfielder	Texas Tech
18	Justin Lebron	Cincinnati Reds	Shortstop	Alabama
19	Liam Peterson	Cleveland Guardians	Pitcher	Florida
20	Jake Schaffner	Boston Red Sox	Shortstop	North Carolina
21	Coleman Borthwick	San Diego Padres	Pitcher	South Walton High School (FL)
22	Cameron Flukey	Detroit Tigers	Pitcher	Coastal Carolina
23	Cade Townsend	Chicago Cubs	Pitcher	Ole Miss
24	Ace Reese	Seattle Mariners	Third baseman	Mississippi State
25	Trey Ebel	Milwaukee Brewers	Shortstop	Corona High School (CA)

=== Prospect Promotion Incentive Picks ===
Pick	Player	Team	Position	School
26	Carter Beck	Atlanta Braves (Note: Received for Drake Baldwin winning National League Rookie of the Year)	Outfielder	Indiana State
27	Carson Wiggins	New York Mets (Note: The Mets exceeded the second competitive-balance tax threshold, which means their first pick will get moved down 10 spots.)	Pitcher	Arkansas
28	Jack Radel	Houston Astros (Note: Received for Hunter Brown finishing in top 3 of Cy Young voting)	Pitcher	Notre Dame

=== Competitive Balance Round A ===
Pick	Player	Team	Position	School
29	Carson Bolemon	San Francisco Giants (from Cleveland) (Note: The San Francisco Giants acquired a Competitive Balance Round A pick from the Cleveland Guardians as a result of a trade on May 9, 2026 that sent catcher Patrick Bailey to Cleveland in exchange for left-handed pitcher Matt Wilkinson and this pick.)	Pitcher	Southside Christian School (SC)
30	Taylor Rabe	Kansas City Royals	Pitcher	Ole Miss
31	Blake Bryant	Arizona Diamondbacks	Pitcher	Citizens Christian High School (GA)
32	Tegan Kuhns	St. Louis Cardinals	Pitcher	Tennessee
33	Taj Marchand	Tampa Bay Rays (from Baltimore) (Note: The Tampa Bay Rays acquired a Competitive Balance Round A pick from the Baltimore Orioles as a result of a trade on December 19, 2025 that sent right-handed pitcher Shane Baz to Baltimore in exchange for catcher Caden Bodine, outfielder Slater de Brun, outfielder Austin Overn, right-handed pitcher Michael Forret and this pick.)	Shortstop	James Island High School (SC)
34	Landon Thome	Chicago White Sox (from Pittsburgh) (Note: The Chicago White Sox acquired a Competitive Balance Round A pick from the Pittsburgh Pirates as a result of a trade on July 10, 2026 that sent infielder Jacob Gonzalez and left-handed pitcher Brandon Eisert to Pittsburgh in exchange for pitcher Jaden Woods and this pick.)	Shortstop	Nazareth Academy High School (IL)
35	Hunter Dietz	New York Yankees (Note: The Yankees exceeded the second competitive-balance tax threshold, which means their first pick will get moved down 10 spots.)	Pitcher	Arkansas
36	Tyler Spangler	Philadelphia Phillies (Note: The Phillies exceeded the second competitive-balance tax threshold, which means their first pick will get moved down 10 spots.)	Shortstop	De La Salle High School (CA)
37	Daniel Jackson	Colorado Rockies	Catcher	Georgia

=== Second round ===
Pick	Player	Team	Position	School
38	Logan Reddemann	Colorado Rockies	Pitcher	UCLA
39	Cole Carlon	Toronto Blue Jays (Note: The Blue Jays exceeded the second competitive-balance tax threshold, which means their first pick will get moved down 10 spots.) (Note: The Blue Jays forfeited their second-round selection as a result of signing Dylan Cease.)	Pitcher	Arizona State
40	Bo Lowrance	Los Angeles Dodgers (Note: The Dodgers exceeded the second competitive-balance tax threshold, which means their first pick will get moved down 10 spots.) (Note: The Dodgers forfeited their second-round selection as a result of signing Kyle Tucker.)	Third baseman	Christ Church Episcopal School (SC)
41	Cole Prosek	Chicago White Sox	Second baseman	Magnolia Heights High School (MS)
42	Chase Brunson	Washington Nationals	Outfielder	TCU
43	Carson Tinney	Minnesota Twins	Catcher	Texas
44	Aiden Ruiz	Pittsburgh Pirates	Shortstop	The Stony Brook School (NY)
45	Jarren Advincula	Los Angeles Angels	Second baseman	Georgia Tech
46	Ty Head	Baltimore Orioles	Outfielder	NC State
47	Mason Edwards	Athletics	Pitcher	USC
48	Kaiden McCarthy	Atlanta Braves	Pitcher	Vermont Academy (VT)
49	Ben Blair	Tampa Bay Rays	Pitcher	Liberty
50	Rocco Maniscalco	St. Louis Cardinals	Shortstop	Oxford High School (AL)
51	Chris Rembert	Pittsburgh Pirates (Note: Compensation for unsigned 2025 No. 50 overall pick Angel Cervantes.)	Second baseman	Auburn
52	Ethan Kleinschmit	Miami Marlins	Pitcher	Oregon State
53	Carson Kerce	Arizona Diamondbacks	Shortstop	Georgia Tech
54	Connor Comeau	Texas Rangers	Shortstop	L. C. Anderson High School (TX)
55	Kaden Waechter	San Francisco Giants	Pitcher	Jesuit High School (FL)
56	Jack Slightom	Kansas City Royals	Pitcher	Lyons Township High School (IL)
57	Wes Mendes	Houston Astros	Pitcher	Florida State
58	Eric Becker	Cincinnati Reds	Shortstop	Virginia
59	Logan Schmidt*	Cleveland Guardians	Pitcher	Ganesha High School (CA)
60	Elliot Lascelles	San Diego Padres	Shortstop	Upper Canada College (ON)
61	Tyson LeBlanc	Detroit Tigers	Shortstop	Kansas
62	Caden Sorrell	Chicago Cubs	Outfielder	Texas A&M
63	Sean Duncan	New York Yankees	Pitcher	Terry Fox Secondary School (BC)
64	Caden Bogenpohl	Philadelphia Phillies	Outfielder	Missouri State
65	Jake Brown	Seattle Mariners	Outfielder	LSU
66	Sawyer Strosnider	Milwaukee Brewers	Outfielder	TCU

=== Competitive Balance Round B ===
Pick	Player	Team	Position	School
67	Owen Hull	Boston Red Sox (from Milwaukee) (Note: The Boston Red Sox acquired a Competitive Balance Round B pick from the Milwaukee Brewers as a result of a six-player trade on February 9, 2026 that sent utility player David Hamilton and pitchers Kyle Harrison and Shane Drohan to Milwaukee in exchange for third baseman Caleb Durbin, infielder Andruw Monasterio, infielder Anthony Seigler and this pick.)	Outfielder	North Carolina
68	Andrew Williamson	St. Louis Cardinals (from Seattle) (Note: The St. Louis Cardinals acquired a Competitive Balance Round B pick from the Seattle Mariners as a result of a three-team trade on February 2, 2026 that sent utility player Brendan Donovan to Seattle in exchange for pitcher Jurrangelo Cijntje, outfielder Tai Peete, outfielder Colton Ledbetter and this pick.)	Outfielder	Central Florida
69	Evan Dempsey	Detroit Tigers	Pitcher	Florida Gulf Coast
70	Mulivai Levu	Cincinnati Reds	First baseman	UCLA
71	Ryan Peterson	Miami Marlins	Pitcher	Sam Houston State
72	Dawson Montesa	St. Louis Cardinals (from Tampa Bay) (Note: The St. Louis Cardinals acquired a Competitive Balance Round B pick from the Tampa Bay Rays as a result of a three-team trade on February 2, 2026 that sent third baseman Ben Williamson to Tampa Bay in exchange for this pick.)	Pitcher	West Virginia
73	Gabe Gaeckle	Athletics	Pitcher	Arkansas
74	Brett Renfrow	Minnesota Twins	Pitcher	Virginia Tech

=== Compensatory round ===
Pick	Player	Team	Position	School
75	Myles Bailey	Chicago Cubs (Note: Compensation pick for the Los Angeles Dodgers signing Kyle Tucker)	First baseman	Florida State

=== Other notable selections ===
Round	Pick	Player	Team	Position	School
3	77	Joey Volchko	Chicago White Sox	Pitcher	Georgia
3	81	Gavin Grahovac	Los Angeles Angels	Third baseman	Texas A&M
3	84	Jensen Hirschkorn	Atlanta Braves	Pitcher	Kingsburg High School (CA)
3	85	Gavin Giese	Tampa Bay Rays	Pitcher	Dana Hills High School (CA)
3	89	Brody Bumila	Texas Rangers	Pitcher	Bishop Feehan High School (MA)
3	90	Peyton Bonds	San Francisco Giants	Outfielder	Rutgers
3	92	Aiden Robbins	New York Mets	Outfielder	Texas
3	99	Brendan Brock	New York Yankees	Catcher	Oklahoma
4	109	Rylan Lujo	Los Angeles Angels	Outfielder	Georgia
4	131	Will Brick	Toronto Blue Jays	Catcher	Christian Brothers High School (TN)
4C	133	Beau Peterson	Houston Astros (Note: Compensation pick for the Detroit Tigers signing Framber Valdez)	Shortstop	Mill Valley High School (KS)
4C	134	Alex Conover	San Diego Padres (Note: Compensation pick for the Toronto Blue Jays signing Dylan Cease)	Outfielder	Oklahoma State
4C	135	Jaxon Jelkin	Philadelphia Phillies (Note: Compensation pick for the Boston Red Sox signing Ranger Suárez)	Pitcher	Kentucky
5	141	Jaxon Willits	Los Angeles Angels	Shortstop	Oklahoma
5	150	Luke Nixon	San Francisco Giants	Second baseman	NC State
5	161	Will Gasparino	Philadelphia Phillies	Outfielder	UCLA
8	235	Rintaro Sasaki	Miami Marlins	First basemen	Stanford
8	248	Luke Pettitte	New York Yankees	Pitcher / Designated hitter	Dallas Baptist
9	258	Tre Phelps	Pittsburgh Pirates	Third baseman	Georgia
11	317	Aidan Teel	Minnesota Twins	Outfielder	Mississippi State
19	559	Jack Salmon	Los Angeles Angels	Outfielder	UNLV
19	583	Luke Bard	Los Angeles Dodgers	Catcher	Houston Christian
20	611	Carsten Sabathia III	Milwaukee Brewers	First baseman	Houston

== Notes ==
Incentive picks

Pick Penalty

Forfeited

Compensation picks

Trades

Incentive picks
