= Jared Grindlinger =

American baseball player (born 2009)

Los Angeles Angels
- Outfielder
- Born: April 16, 2009 (age 17); Huntington Beach, California, U.S.
- Bats: Left Throws: Left

Jared Adam Grindlinger (born April 16, 2009) is an American professional baseball outfielder in the Los Angeles Angels organization.

== Amateur career ==
Grindlinger attended Huntington Beach High School in Huntington Beach, California. He played for the United States national under-15 baseball team in 2024 and for the United States national under-18 baseball team in 2025. On September 6, 2025, he was a part of a combined no-hitter with Carson Bolemon versus Chinese Taipei in a 4-0 win, the fourth no-hitter in 18U National Team history. He had a 5–0 record, a 0.84 ERA, and 34 strikeouts across 32 1/3 innings for Huntington Beach in 2025. Originally set to graduate from high school in 2027, Grindlinger reclassified to the class of 2026. In 2026, he helped lead Huntington Beach to a Southern California Regional Division I title. He finished the season with a .376 batting average with ten doubles alongside pitching to a 6–0 record, a 0.85 ERA and 66 strikeouts. He was invited to attend the 2026 MLB Draft Combine at Chase Field. Grindlinger committed to play college baseball for the Tennessee Volunteers.

== Professional career ==
Grindlinger was selected by the Los Angeles Angels with the 12th overall pick in the 2026 Major League Baseball draft as an outfielder. He later signed with the Angels for a signing bonus of $5.8 million.

== Personal life ==
Grindlinger has two older brothers. His oldest brother, Brad, played college baseball at Long Beach State University. His other brother, Trent, plays college baseball at the University of Tennessee.
