= Coleman Borthwick =

American baseball player (born 2008)

San Diego Padres
- Pitcher
- Born: April 13, 2008 (age 18); South Walton Beach, Florida, U.S.
- Bats: Right Throws: Right
Medals
Men's baseball
Representing United States
U-18 Baseball World Cup
Gold medal – first place	2025 Naha-Itoman	Team

Coleman Borthwick (born April 13, 2008) is an American professional baseball pitcher in the San Diego Padres organization.

== Amateur career ==
Borthwick attended South Walton High School in Santa Rosa Beach, Florida. As a junior, he recorded a .471 batting average with six home runs and 51 RBI. Following his junior year, Borthwick played for the United States national under-18 baseball team at the 2025 U-18 Baseball World Cup, batting .300 with five RBI. He also pitched ten innings, recording 12 strikeouts in nine games, and was named the tournament's MVP. Additionally, he was named the WBSC 2025 Baseball Player of the Year. As a senior in 2026, he had an 11-0 record, a 0.21 ERA, and 121 strikeouts to seven walks in 65 2/3 innings alongside batting .460 with nine home runs. He was named the Florida Gatorade Baseball Player of the Year. He committed to play college baseball at Auburn University.

== Professional career ==
Borthwick was considered a top prospect for the 2026 Major League Baseball draft. He was selected by the San Diego Padres in the first round with the 21st overall pick as a pitcher. On July 24, 2026, he signed with the Padres for a signing bonus of $3.8 million.
