= Ethan Kleinschmit =

American baseball player (born 2005)

Miami Marlins
- Pitcher
- Born: May 6, 2005 (age 21); Silverton, Oregon, U.S.
- Bats: Left Throws: Left

Ethan Edward Kleinschmit (born May 6, 2005) is an American professional baseball pitcher in the Miami Marlins organization.

== Amateur career ==
Kleinschmit attended John F. Kennedy High School in Mt. Angel, Oregon, where he won back-to-back state championships as a junior in 2022 and as a senior in 2023. As a senior, he had a 16–0 win–loss record, a 0.56 earned run average (ERA), and 178 strikeouts across 75 innings pitched.

After graduating from high school, Kleinschmit played his freshman season of college baseball in 2024 at Linn–Benton Community College. He made 13 starts and went 6–1 with a 1.03 ERA and 120 strikeouts. Following the season's end, he transferred to Oregon State University. In his first year at Oregon State, Kleinschmit made 17 starts and had an 8–5 record, a 3.56 ERA and 113 strikeouts over 91 innings. After the season, he was invited to the USA Baseball Collegiate National Team training camp. As a junior for the Beavers in 2026, he started 15 games and went 9–2 with a 3.74 ERA and 97 strikeouts across 77 innings. Following the end of the collegiate season, he was invited to and attended the MLB Draft Combine at Chase Field.

== Professional career ==
Kleinschmit was selected by the Miami Marlins in the second round with the 52nd overall pick of the 2026 Major League Baseball draft. He signed with the Marlins for a $1.9 million signing bonus.
