= Ole Miss Rebels baseball =

Baseball team of the University of Mississippi

Ole Miss Rebels
- 2026 Ole Miss Rebels baseball team
- Founded: 1893 (132 years ago)
- University: University of Mississippi
- Athletic director: Keith Carter
- Head coach: Mike Bianco (26th season)
- Conference: SEC
- Location: Oxford, Mississippi
- Home stadium: Swayze Field (capacity: 11,476)
- Nickname: Rebels
- Colors: Cardinal red and navy blue

College World Series champions
- 2022

College World Series appearances
- 1956, 1964, 1969, 1972, 2014, 2022, 2026

NCAA regional champions
- 2005, 2006, 2007, 2009, 2014, 2019, 2021, 2022, 2026

NCAA tournament appearances
- 1956, 1964, 1969, 1972, 1977, 1995, 1999, 2001, 2003, 2004, 2005, 2006, 2007, 2008, 2009, 2010, 2012, 2013, 2014, 2015, 2016, 2018, 2019, 2021, 2022, 2025, 2026

Conference tournament champions
- 1977, 2006, 2018

Conference regular season champions
- 1959, 1960, 1964, 1969, 1972, 1977, 1982, 2009

Conference division regular season champions
- 1954, 1956, 1959, 1960, 1963, 1964, 1967, 1969, 1972, 1977, 1982, 2005, 2009, 2014, 2018

The Ole Miss Rebels baseball team represents the University of Mississippi in NCAA Division I college baseball. The team participates in the Southeastern Conference (SEC). They are currently coached by Mike Bianco and play at Swayze Field. They have competed in the College World Series seven times, with their first national championship coming in 2022.

== History ==
The University of Mississippi has games recorded as early as 1893. What is commonly referred to as the "modern era" is considered to have started in 1947.

Twenty different coaches have led Ole Miss baseball, but only six of those have done so during the modern era. Mike Bianco became the latest Ole Miss Rebels baseball head coach in June 2000.

Since Bianco's arrival, they have captured four Southeastern Conference Western Division titles, the last in 2018. All-time, the Rebels have won seven Southeastern Conference championships and have made the NCAA tournament 25 times. They have also advanced to the College World Series in Omaha, Nebraska, six times, most recently in 2022.

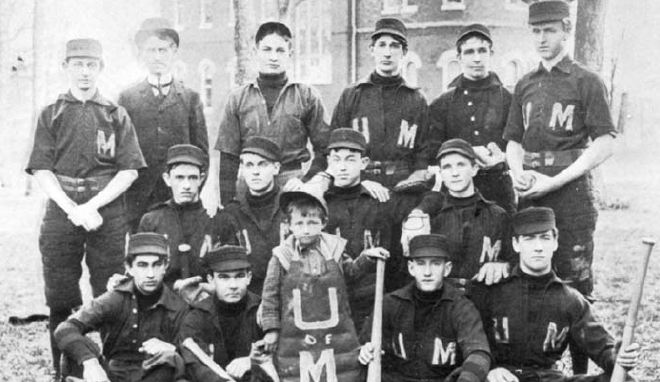
The 1893 Ole Miss baseball team.

=== Early years (1893–1946) ===
The first Ole Miss baseball game on record is a 6–3 loss to Mississippi A&M (now known as Mississippi State University) in Starkville, Mississippi, during 1893.

On the eve of World War I the Rebel baseball team was helmed by future New York Yankee and Hall of Fame member Casey Stengel. He compiled a record of 13–9 as skipper of the Rebels and earned the nickname "The Old Perfessor."

=== Smith-Swayze era (1947–1971) ===
During the Smith-Swayze era, Ole Miss played in three College World Series. The team also won four SEC championships.

=== Jake Gibbs era (1972–1990) ===
After the conclusion of his major league baseball career, Jake Gibbs returned to Oxford to coach the Ole Miss baseball team. His first season demonstrated he was winner as a coach just as he had been as a player. But the 1972 season started slow for Gibbs and the Rebels. Going into the 10th game of the season the team was just 4–5. Ole Miss began a run once conference play began and compiled a 15–3 mark against the other teams in the SEC, including a sweep of rival Mississippi State University. This mark was good enough to secure the SEC title. In the 1972 NCAA University Division baseball tournament the team defeated Jacksonville State but suffered a loss at the hands of ACC Champion Virginia. A subsequent win over Florida State placed them in a rematch with Virginia, a game they won convincingly 9–0. The tournament ended with 2 games against South Alabama, a team that had swept Ole Miss at the beginning of the season. Once again, Ole Miss proved they were the better team when it mattered, winning both and advancing to the College World Series.

The 1977 baseball season saw the Southeastern Conference adopt a conference tournament for the first time. The winner of the conference tournament was extended an automatic invitation to the NCAA tournament. This privilege has continued unbroken to the present. The 1977 Rebel squad, coached by Jake Gibbs, captured the regular season SEC title with a 15–9 record. This gave the Rebels hosting duties for the first conference tournament. Ole Miss turned their home field advantage and #1 seed into a title, winning the inaugural tournament with a record of 4–1.

=== Don Kessinger era (1991–1996) ===
By the middle of the 1990s the Rebel baseball team was consistently winning 30 games each season but had been absent from the post season since 1977. The commitment to baseball remained strong, however. Jake Gibbs retired in 1990 and another former Rebel All-American and Major League star Don Kessinger took over the reins. His 1995 squad won 40 games and ended the team's postseason drought. Led by All-Americans David Delucci and Jamey Price, the Rebels advanced to the championship game of the 1995 NCAA Division I baseball tournament regional but were eliminated by host Florida State.

=== Pat Harrison era (1997–2000) ===
In 1999 the NCAA adopted the current 64-team Regional and Super Regional format for playoffs. Ole Miss, a storied program that had long been slumbering, made an appearance in this inaugural tournament, just their second trip to the postseason in 22 years. They won their first regional game under the new format, a 12–3 drubbing of Monmouth before they were eliminated by host Texas A&M.

=== Mike Bianco era (2001–present) ===
The hiring of Mike Bianco, from McNeese State began a long period of awakening the sleeping giant of Ole Miss baseball. At the helm of the Cowboys program for 3 seasons Bianco won 100 games and appeared in the 2000 post season. He had no trouble finding immediate success in Oxford as he guided the Rebels to the 2001 post season and won the second regional game in school history.

The 2005 Ole Miss Rebels team ascended to heights unseen in Oxford for many years. The team won 48 games that season, won their first SEC Western Division crown, and earned the first national seed in school history. The Rebels went 4–0 in the Regional and Super Regional tournaments defeating Maine, Oklahoma (x2) and Texas before losing 2 straight to Texas by no more than 2 runs. The Longhorns would then continue to Omaha and win the National Title. Their loss to Ole Miss was just one of their two losses the entire post season.

The 2006 campaign was not one of rebuilding but of reloading. The Rebels won 44 games and sprinted through the postseason. During the SEC Conference Tournament in Hoover, Alabama Ole Miss went 4–0 and won their first tournament title since 1977. The next two weekends they won 4 more straight games in Regional and Super Regional competition with wins over Bethune-Cookman, South Alabama, Tulane, and Miami. As with the prior season Ole Miss ended the season in Super Regionals with 2 straight losses after gaining an initial 1–0 lead in the series. Miami would go to deal eventual National Champion Oregon State one of their two losses in Omaha.

The 2007 season cemented Mike Bianco's Rebels as a dominant force in college baseball. The team topped 40 wins for the third consecutive season as well as reached the Super Regional portion of the NCAA tournament for the third consecutive time. Their season ended at the hands of #5 National Seed Arizona State in Tempe.

For the first time since 1977, the Rebels won a share of the Southeastern Conference regular season title in 2009. The team won 20 conference games and 48 total on the season. The Rebels were selected to host a regional in Oxford where they defeated Missouri and Western Kentucky. The regional championship came courtesy of a brilliant pitching performance by Drew Pomeranz in a Monday elimination game. Pomeranz pitched a complete game and struck out 16 Western Kentucky Hilltoppers in the 4–1 win. In super regional play against Virginia, Ole Miss won the first game but were unable to complete the series and fell 1–2 to the Cavaliers.

The Rebels surprised critics in 2014 by capturing the SEC West title (their 3rd under Mike Bianco) and topping 40 wins for the 5th time. Nine players from the 2014 roster were drafted by Major League teams, the most of any team in the nation. Ole Miss went 3–0 in regional play with a win over Jacksonville St. and two over Washington (including an extra-inning second win) to advance to their 5th Super Regional.

The team traveled to Lafayette, Louisiana to face the #1 ranked Ragin' Cajuns in Super Regional action. Despite losing the first game, the Rebels rallied to win games 2 and 3 and advance to the College World Series.

After opening the CWS with a loss to the Virginia Cavaliers, the Rebels reeled off 2 straight wins against Texas Tech and TCU in the losers bracket, advancing to the Semi-Finals and a re-match with the Cavaliers which they lost.

Mike Bianco and his Ole Miss Rebel squad topped 40 wins for the 7th time, won the SEC Western Division title, and also captured the SEC Conference Tournament title played annually in Hoover, Alabama. The tournament proved dramatic as the #2 seeded Rebels lost their first game to Auburn and then faced elimination against Georgia in their second. The match against Georgia went to extra innings prompting a comeback in the 10th inning with Georgia leading 4–3. The team collected the necessary 2-runs in the bottom of the 10th for a walk-off win. This win vaulted the team to three consecutive wins (Auburn, Texas A&M, LSU) and the title as their pitching staff gave up just 2 runs in the remaining 27 innings of play. In the final game of the tournament the Rebels defeated long-time rival LSU by a margin of 9–1 in a rematch of the 2008 final.

The 2018 NCAA Division I baseball tournament opened in Oxford a day late after flooding left Swayze Field underwater. The Rebels fell down early 2–0 to the St. Louis University Billikens and their ace pitcher, Miller Hogan. A 6-run 2nd inning followed by 2 more runs in the 3rd chased Hogan from the game as the Rebels went on to a 9–2 win. However, Ole Miss was subsequently eliminated from the post-season after losing two straight to Tennessee Tech, winner of the Oxford Regional.

In 2019, the decade ended with Ole Miss winning yet another 40 games in a season. They fell one run short of winning the SEC tournament title for the second year in a row against #1 Vanderbilt. The Arkansas Razorbacks proved a key figure in the Ole Miss 2019 run as the Rebels bested the Razorbacks in Fayetteville during the regular season. During the SEC tournament the Razorbacks once again raised their Hog Call as the Rebels met them twice, losing the first match but winning the second. The remarkable SEC tournament run played Ole Miss into a regional host position and a #12 national seed.

The 2019 NCAA Division I baseball tournament saw Illinois, Clemson, and Jacksonville State visiting Oxford for regional play. Ole Miss wasted no time racking up wins and scoring runs. They defeated Clemson between two Jacksonville State wins to take the regional 3–0 with a 41–7 run margin. The next weekend saw the Rebels travel to a well-known destination, Fayetteville, to meet the Arkansas Razorbacks once again. The Super Regional saw Ole Miss and Arkansas play their sixth, seventh, and eighth contests of the season against one another.

The 2020 NCAA baseball season was canceled during the season because of the COVID-19 virus. For Ole Miss, the season ended right before the start of SEC play. Ole Miss ended the season on a 16-game win streak with a key inaugural series win over #1 Louisville. Ole Miss had incredible seasons from two guys that could’ve landed the Golden Spikes Award. Third baseman Tyler Keenan led the nation with a .403 batting average while shortstop Anthony Servideo hit .390 before the season was canceled. The 3 Rebels starters had an average ERA of 2.33 with a bullpen who ranked at the top in the country in almost every stat. Ole Miss finished the season ranked #1 in the D1 Baseball polls, and it ended a season that could’ve seen the Rebels make it to their 7th Omaha appearance and possibly win their first national championship.

Ole Miss began the 2022 NCAA Division I baseball tournament as the No. 3 seed in the Coral Gables Regional. They defeated Arizona, #6 Miami and Arizona to advance to the Hattiesburg Super Regional against in-state competitor Southern Miss. There, the Rebels shut out the No. 11 Eagles (10–0, 5–0) to reach the College World Series for the second time under Bianco and sixth in program history. Ole Miss opened the 2022 College World Series with a 5–1 victory over #14 Auburn before defeating Arkansas 13–5 to leave them one game from the finals. Arkansas would rebound for a 3–2 win in game 2 before the Rebels advanced to the CWS finals for the first time with a 2–0 win in game 3. Matched up against Oklahoma, Ole Miss swept the Sooners with a 10–3 victory in game 1 and a 4–2 victory in game 2 to win the program's first national championship.

== NCAA Regional appearances ==
NCAA Regional Results
1956 NCAA District III playoffs in Gastonia, NC

Defeated Tennessee Tech, 4–3
Defeated Tennessee Tech, 3–2
Lost to Duke, 2–4
Defeated Duke, 6–2
Defeated Duke, 7–1
Regional Championship

1964 NCAA District III playoffs in Gastonia, NC

Defeated West Virginia, 11–0
Defeated North Carolina, 4–3
Defeated North Carolina, 13–1
Regional Championship

1969 NCAA District III playoffs in Gastonia, NC

Defeated Virginia Tech, 7–6^{11}
Defeated North Carolina, 6–5
Defeated North Carolina, 5–2
Regional Championship

1972 NCAA District III playoffs in Gastonia, NC

Defeated Jacksonville, 9–3
Lost to Virginia, 9–3
Defeated Florida State, 8–3
Defeated South Alabama, 8–4
Defeated South Alabama, 12–1
Regional Championship

1977 NCAA South Regional in Miami, FL

Lost to Clemson, 7–8
Defeated Morehead State, 5–2
Lost to Miami (FL), 2–5

1995 NCAA Atlantic I Regional in Tallahassee, FL

Lost to Old Dominion, 3–5
Defeated Troy State, 8–5
Defeated UCF, 10–4
Defeated Old Dominion, 5–4
Lost to Florida State, 1–13

1999 NCAA College Station Regional hosted by Texas A&M

Lost to Long Beach State, 3–4
Defeated Monmouth, 12–3
Lost to Texas A&M, 7–13

2001 NCAA New Orleans Regional hosted by Tulane

Lost to Oklahoma State, 4–5
Defeated Southern, 10–2
Lost to Oklahoma State, 7–16

2003 NCAA Houston Regional hosted by Rice

Lost to Wichita State, 2–4
Defeated McNeese State, 7–1
Lost to Wichita State, 4–5

2004 NCAA Oxford Regional hosted by Ole Miss

Lost to Western Kentucky, 0–1
Lost to Washington, 2–7

2005 NCAA Oxford Regional hosted by Ole Miss

Defeated Maine, 5–0
Defeated Oklahoma, 7–5
Defeated Oklahoma, 20–3
Regional Championship

2006 NCAA Oxford Regional hosted by Ole Miss

Defeated Bethune–Cookman, 3–2
Defeated South Alabama, 9–7
Defeated Tulane, 12–4
Regional Championship

2007 NCAA Oxford Regional hosted by Ole Miss

Defeated Sam Houston State, 14–5
Defeated Southern Miss, 4–0
Defeated Sam Houston State, 21–13
Regional Championship

2008 NCAA Coral Gables Regional hosted by Miami (FL)

Lost to Missouri, 0–7
Defeated Bethune–Cookman, 14–1
Defeated Missouri, 9–6
Lost to Miami (FL), 2–11

2009 NCAA Oxford Regional hosted by Ole Miss

Defeated Monmouth, 8–1
Defeated Western Kentucky, 7–4
Lost to Western Kentucky, 9–10
Defeated Western Kentucky, 4–1
Regional Championship

2010 NCAA Charlottesville Regional hosted by Virginia

Defeated St. John's, 10–5
Lost to Virginia, 7–13
Lost to St. John's, 16–20

2012 NCAA College Station Regional hosted by Texas A&M

Defeated TCU, 6–2
Defeated Texas A&M, 6–3
Lost to TCU, 2–5
Lost to TCU, 4–7

2013 NCAA Raleigh Regional hosted by NC State

Lost to William & Mary, 2–4
Defeated Binghamton, 8–4
Lost to William & Mary, 1–4

2014 NCAA Oxford Regional hosted by Ole Miss

Defeated Jacksonville State, 12–2
Defeated Washington, 2–1
Defeated Washington, 3–2
Regional Championship

2015 NCAA Los Angeles Regional hosted by UCLA

Lost to Maryland, 1–3
Lost to Cal State Bakersfield, 1–2

2016 NCAA Oxford Regional hosted by Ole Miss

Lost to Utah, 5–6
Lost to Tulane, 5–6

2018 NCAA Oxford Regional hosted by Ole Miss

Defeated Saint Louis, 9–2
Defeated Tennessee Tech, 9–8
Lost to Tennessee Tech, 5–15
Lost to Tennessee Tech, 2–3

2019 NCAA Oxford Regional hosted by Ole Miss

Defeated Jacksonville State, 16–2
Defeated Clemson, 6–1
Defeated Jacksonville State, 19–4
Regional Championship

2021 NCAA Oxford Regional hosted by Ole Miss

Defeated Southeast Missouri State, 6–3
Defeated Florida State, 4–3
Lost to Southern Miss, 7–10
Defeated Southern Miss, 12–9
Regional Championship

2022 NCAA Coral Gables Regional hosted by Miami (FL)

Defeated Arizona, 7–4
Defeated Miami (FL), 2–1
Defeated Arizona, 22–6
Regional Championship

2025 NCAA Oxford Regional hosted by Ole Miss
Lost to Murray State, 6–9
Defeated Western Kentucky, 8–6
Defeated Georgia Tech, 11–9
Defeated Murray State, 19–8
Lost to Murray State 11–12
2026 NCAA Lincoln Regional hosted by Nebraska
Defeated Arizona State, 7–6 (14)
Defeated Nebraska, 6-3
Defeated Arizona State, 5-4 (10)
Regional Championship

== NCAA Super Regional appearances ==
NCAA Super Regional Results
2005 Oxford Super Regional hosted by Ole Miss

Defeated Texas, 6–4
Lost to Texas, 1–3
Lost to Texas, 4–6

2006 Oxford Super Regional hosted by Ole Miss

Defeated Miami (FL), 11–9
Lost to Miami (FL), 0–7
Lost to Miami (FL), 9–14

2007 Tempe Super Regional hosted by Arizona State

Lost to Arizona State, 3–4
Lost to Arizona State, 1–7

2009 Oxford Super Regional hosted by Ole Miss

Defeated Virginia, 4–3
Lost to Virginia, 3–4
Lost to Virginia, 1–5

2014 Lafayette Super Regional hosted by Louisiana–Lafayette

Lost to Louisiana–Lafayette, 5–9
Defeated Louisiana–Lafayette, 5–2
Defeated Louisiana–Lafayette, 10–4
Advance to College World Series

2019 Fayetteville Super Regional hosted by Arkansas

Lost to Arkansas, 2–11
Defeated Arkansas, 13–5
Lost to Arkansas, 1–14

2021 Tucson Super Regional hosted by Arizona

Lost to Arizona, 3–9
Defeated Arizona, 12–3
Lost to Arizona, 3–16

2022 Hattiesburg Super Regional hosted by Southern Miss

Defeated Southern Miss, 10–0
Defeated Southern Miss, 5–0
Advance to College World Series

2026 Auburn Super Regional hosted by Auburn
Defeated Auburn, 6-4
Defeated Auburn, 5-3
Advance to College World Series

== NCAA College World Series appearances ==
NCAA College World Series Results
1956 College World Series in Omaha, NE

Defeated New Hampshire, 13–12
Defeated Bradley, 4–0
Lost to Minnesota, 5–13
Lost to Arizona, 3–7

1964 College World Series in Omaha, NE

Lost to USC, 2–3
Lost to Arizona State, 0–5

1969 College World Series in Omaha, NE

Lost to NYU, 3–8
Defeated Southern Illinois, 8–1
Lost to Texas, 1–14

1972 College World Series in Omaha, NE

Lost to USC, 6–8
Lost to Texas, 8–9

2014 College World Series in Omaha, NE

Lost to Virginia, 1–2
Defeated Texas Tech, 2–1
Defeated TCU, 6–4
Lost to Virginia, 1–4

2022 College World Series in Omaha, NE

Defeated Auburn, 5–1
Defeated Arkansas, 13–5
Lost to Arkansas, 2–3
Defeated Arkansas, 2–0
Defeated Oklahoma, 10–3
Defeated Oklahoma, 4–2
National Championship

2026 College World Series in Omaha, NE
Lost to North Carolina, 2-6
Lost to Troy, 8-12

== Stadiums ==
=== Oxford-University Stadium/ Swayze Field ===
Ole Miss baseball plays their home games at Oxford-University Stadium/ Swayze Field, a $3.75 million facility that was completed in October 1988. The first game held there was against Cumberland University on February 19, 1989, in which the Rebels took a doubleheader sweep.

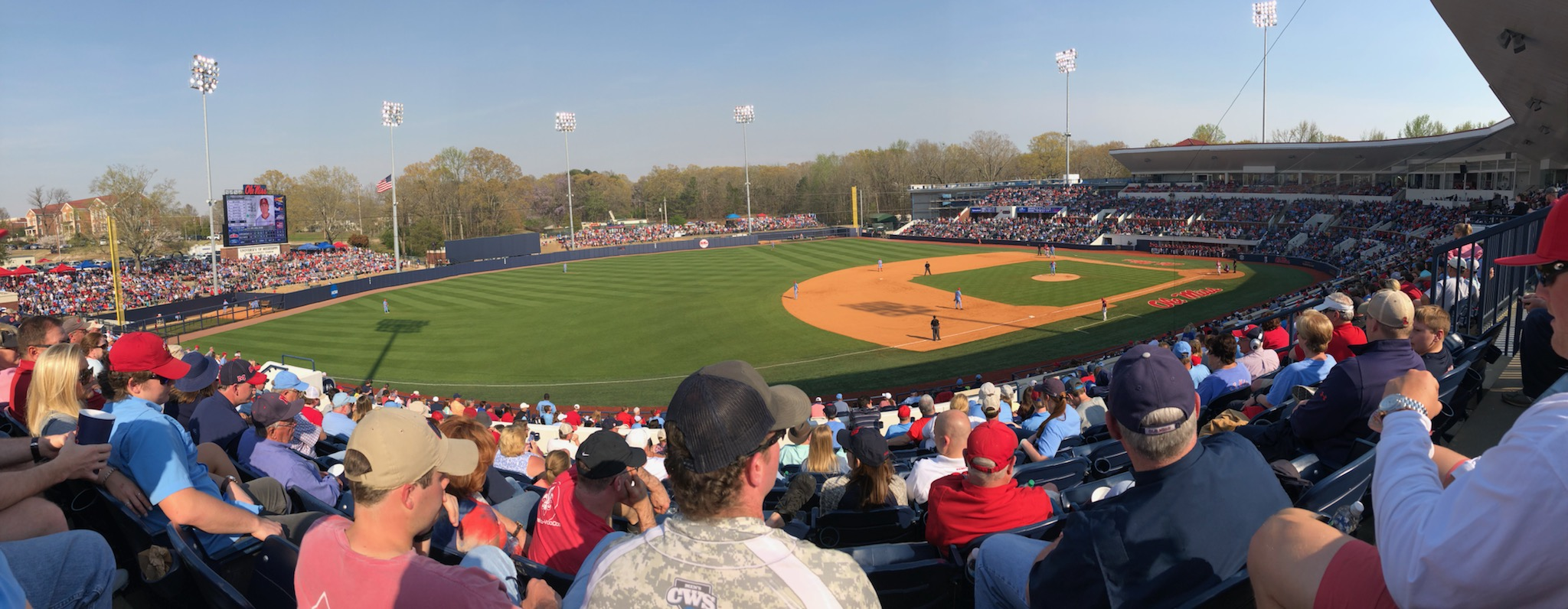
Panoramic view of Oxford-University Stadium/Swayze Field at Ole Miss

==== Attendance milestones ====
Ole Miss commonly draws more than 10,000 fans to a single game. The first crowd in excess of 10,000 (10,323) occurred on June 6, 2009, against Virginia in Super Regional play. The first crowd in excess of 11,000 (11,729) occurred during a regular season game against Alabama on April 13, 2013. The first crowd to top 12,000 (12,117) packed Swayze for an opening day game against East Carolina on February 17, 2017. The current record is 12,151 set against LSU on April 28, 2018.

==== Stadium attendance ====
| Year | Games | Attendance | Average |
|---|---|---|---|
| 2025 | 38 | 367,783 | 9,679 |
| 2024 | 31 | 298,468 | 9,628 |
| 2023 | 32 | 323,047 | 10,095 |
| 2022 | 31 | 309,949 | 9,998 |
| 2021 | 40 | 320,859 | 8,022 |
| 2020† | 12 | 103,818 | 8,652 |
| 2019 | 31 | 276,241 | 8,911 |
| 2018 | 35 | 286,020 | 8,172 |
| 2017 | 32 | 273,448 | 8,545 |
| 2016 | 33 | 284,413 | 8,619 |
| 2015 | 28 | 225,873 | 8,066 |
| 2014 | 34 | 271,920 | 7,997 |
| 2013 | 30 | 239,909 | 7,996 |
| 2012 | 25 | 186,272 | 7,450 |
| 2011 | 32 | 261,006 | 8,156 |
| 2010 | 33 | 223,035 | 6,759 |
| 2009 | 39 | 273,111 | 7,003 |
| 2008 | 33 | 155,489 | 4,712 |
| 2007 | 35 | 173,523 | 4,958 |
| 2006 | 36 | 174,756 | 4,854 |
| 2005 | 39 | 170,152 | 4,363 |
| 2004 | 35 | 122,382 | 3,497 |
| 2003 | 35 | 73,154 | 2,090 |
| 2002 | 36 | 84,910 | 2,359 |
| 2001 | 31 | 58,929 | 1,900 |
| 2000 | 32 | 40,130 | 1,254 |
| 1999 | 26 | 54,606 | 2,100 |

†2020 season was cut short due to Covid

NCAA Baseball Attendance

== Notable players ==
=== National awards ===
- ABCA/Rawlings Gold Glove Catcher

Hayden Dunhurst – 2021

- D1Baseball Freshman of the Year

Jacob Gonzalez – 2021

- Brooks Wallace Award

Grae Kessinger – 2019

- Johnny Bench Award

Stuart Turner – 2013

- Collegiate Baseball Freshman of the Year Award

Stephen Head – 2003

=== SEC awards ===
- Pitcher of the Year

Drew Pomeranz – 2010

- Player of the Year Award

Stephen Head – 2004

- Freshman of the Year Award

Seth Smith – 2002
Stephen Head – 2003
Jordan Henry – 2007

=== 1st Team All-Americans ===
| Player | Position | Year(s) | Selectors |
|---|---|---|---|
| Jake Gibbs | Third baseman | 1960† | ABCA |
| Donnie Kessinger | Shortstop | 1964† | ABCA, SN |
| Dan Adams | Third baseman | 1970 | SN |
| Paul Husband | Outfielder | 1972†, 1973 | ABCA, SN |
| Jamey Price | Pitcher | 1995 | CB |
| David Dellucci | Outfield | 1995 | NCBWA |
| Stephen Head | Utility player | 2004, 2005 | BA, ABCA |
| Scott Bittle | Pitcher | 2008 | BA, NCBWA |
| Drew Pomeranz | Pitcher | 2010† | ABCA, BA, CB, NCBWA |
| Alex Yarbrough | Second baseman | 2012† | ABCA, BA, CB, NCBWA |
| Stuart Turner | Catcher | 2013 | ABCA, BA |
| Austin Bousefield | Outfielder | 2014 | ABCA |
| Tyler Keenan | Third baseman | 2020 | CB |
| Taylor Broadway | Pitcher | 2021 | NCBWA |
| Doug Nikhazy | Pitcher | 2021† | ABCA, BA, CB, NCBWA |

== Ole Miss and MLB ==
=== Active Major League Baseball (MLB) players ===
- Mike Mayers, RHP, Los Angeles Angels
- Drew Pomeranz, LHP, Chicago Cubs
- Nick Fortes, C, Miami Marlins
- Grae Kessinger, 2B, Arizona Diamondbacks
- James McArthur, RHP, Kansas City Royals
- Jacob Waguespack, RHP, Tampa Bay Rays
- Doug Nikhazy, LHP, Cleveland Guardians
- Gunnar Hoglund, RHP, Athletics
- Tim Elko, 1B, Chicago White Sox
- Ryan Rolison, LHP, Chicago Cubs
- Houston Roth, RHP, Baltimore Orioles
- Jacob Gonzalez, SS, Chicago White Sox

=== Top Five Round MLB Draft Picks ===
==== First round ====
- (1970) 8th Overall - Daniel Adams, 3B, Milwaukee Brewers
- (1999) 42nd Overall - Mike Rosamond, OF, Houston Astros
- (2006) 36th Overall - Chris Coghlan, 3B, Florida Marlins
- (2008) 39th Overall - Lance Lynn, RHP, St. Louis Cardinals
- (2010) 5th Overall - Drew Pomeranz, LHP, Cleveland Indians
- (2018) 22nd Overall - Ryan Rolison, LHP, Colorado Rockies
- (2021) 19th Overall - Gunnar Hoglund, RHP, Toronto Blue Jays
- (2023) 15th Overall - Jacob Gonzalez, SS, Chicago White Sox
- (2026) 23rd Overall - Cade Townsend, RHP, Chicago Cubs
- (2026) 30th Overall - Taylor Rabe, RHP, Kansas City Royals

==== Second round ====
- (1969) 34th Overall - Tom Nichols, SS, Minnesota Twins
- (1971) 39th Overall - Archie Manning, SS, Kansas City Royals
- (1972) 40th Overall - Steve Dillard, SS, Boston Red Sox
- (2004) 50th Overall - Seth Smith, OF, Colorado Rockies
- (2005) 62nd Overall - Stephen Head, 1B, Cleveland Indians
- (2007) 79th Overall - Zack Cozart, SS, Cincinnati Reds
- (2007) 65th Overall - Will Kline, RHP, Tampa Bay Rays
- (2008) 67th Overall - Cody Satterwhite, RHP, Detroit Tigers
- (2016) 57th Overall - J. B. Woodman, OF, Toronto Blue Jays
- (2019) 68th Overall - Grae Kessinger, SS, Houston Astros
- (2021) 58th Overall - Doug Nikhazy, LHP, Cleveland Indians
- (2023) 47th Overall - Kemp Alderman, OF, Miami Marlins

==== Third round ====
- (1967) 41st Overall - James Yawn, 2B, New York Yankees
- (1973) 60th Overall - Paul Husband, OF, St. Louis Cardinals
- (1980) 69th Overall - Jeff Calhoun, LHP, Houston Astros
- (2005) 100th Overall - Mark Holliman, RHP, Chicago Cubs
- (2005) 97th Overall - Matt Maloney, LHP, Philadelphia Phillies
- (2005) 86th Overall - Brian Pettway, OF, Toronto Blue Jays
- (2013) 93rd Overall - Mike Mayers, RHP, St. Louis Cardinals
- (2013) 78th Overall - Stuart Turner, C, Minnesota Twins
- (2014) 88th Overall - Chris Ellis, RHP, Los Angeles Angels
- (2020) 74th Overall - Anthony Servideo, SS, Baltimore Orioles
- (2025) 83rd Overall - Mason Morris, RHP, Cincinnati Reds

==== Fourth round ====
- (1992) 112th Overall - Ken Carlyle, RHP, Detroit Tigers
- (2009) 129th Overall - Scott Bittle, RHP, St. Louis Cardinals
- (2012) 147th Overall - Alex Yarbrough, 2B, Los Angeles Angels
- (2018) 117th Overall - Nick Fortes, C, Miami Marlins
- (2020) 107th Overall - Tyler Keenan, 3B, Seattle Mariners
- (2025) 132nd Overall - Luke Hill, 3B, Cleveland Guardians
- (2026) 117th Overall - Hudson Calhoun, RHP, Texas Rangers

==== Fifth round ====
- (2005) 146th Overall - Eric Fowler, LHP, Toronto Blue Jays
- (2009) 145th Overall - Nate Baker, LHP, Pittsburgh Pirates
- (2013) 161st Overall - Bobby Wahl, RHP, Oakland Athletics
- (2014) 147th Overall - Austin Bousfield, OF, San Diego Padres
- (2018) 143rd Overall - Brady Feigl, RHP, Oakland Athletics
- (2019) 159th Overall - Will Ethridge, RHP, Colorado Rockies
- (2019) 163rd Overall - Thomas Dillard, C, Milwaukee Brewers

== See also ==
- List of NCAA Division I baseball programs
