= Kaiden McCarthy =

American baseball player (born 2008)

Atlanta Braves
- Pitcher
- Born: August 6, 2008 (age 18); Springfield, Vermont, U.S.
- Bats: Right Throws: Right

Kaiden Patrick McCarthy (born August 6, 2008) is an American professional baseball pitcher in the Atlanta Braves organization.

== Amateur career ==
McCarthy attended Vermont Academy in Saxtons River, Vermont. Prior to his junior season, McCarthy reclassified to the class of 2026. As a junior, he posted a 0.72 ERA with 72 strikeouts and was named the Gatorade Vermont Baseball Player of the Year. He is committed to play college baseball for the University of Tennessee.

== Professional career ==
McCarthy was selected by the Atlanta Braves in the second round, with the 48th overall selection, of the 2026 Major League Baseball draft. With his selection, he became the highest-drafted player from Vermont in MLB draft history. He signed with Atlanta for a $2.5 million bonus on July 14, 2026.
