= Brody Bumila =

American baseball player (born 2008)

Texas Rangers
- Pitcher
- Born: January 28, 2008 (age 18); Taunton, Massachusetts, U.S.
- Bats: Left Throws: Left

Brody Steven Bumila (born January 28, 2008) is an American professional baseball pitcher in the Texas Rangers organization.

== Amateur career ==
Bumila attended Bishop Feehan High School in Attleboro, Massachusetts. He suffered an UCL injury in the summer of 2024 and was unable to pitch in 2025. He played as a first baseman and designated hitter while recovering. As a senior in 2026 on the basketball court, he was named the MaxPreps Massachusetts Basketball Player of the Year after averaging 30.6 points and 15.2 rebounds across 27 games. In the MIAA Division 1 tournament he helped the Shamrocks clinch the Division 1 title, the program's first. He was named Catholic Central League MVP. He returned to pitching during his senior baseball season after being unable to throw for nearly two years following an elbow injury, which involved the insertion of an elbow brace.

Bumila committed to play college baseball for the Texas Longhorns. During his senior year in 2026, Bumila threw a no-hitter in which he struck out 20 of the 22 batters he faced. Bumila helped lead Bishop Feehan to the Divison 1 State Championship, a game where he gave up two earned runs, two walks, and struck out four batters in a 13-4 loss before being removed as a pitcher after two innings due to what Bumila called a "dead arm." Bumila was named the Gatorade Massachusetts Baseball Player of the Year as well as the MaxPreps Male Athlete of the Year. After the high school season, he was invited and attended the 2026 MLB Draft Combine at Chase Field. On July 8, Bumila informed MLB teams of an UCL injury in his pitching arm.

== Professional career ==
Bumila was considered a top prospect for the 2026 Major League Baseball draft. He was selected in the third round with the 89th overall pick by the Texas Rangers. He signed with the Rangers for $2.75 million. Following Bumila's signing, it was announced that he would undergo Tommy John surgery.
