= Logan Hughes =

American baseball player (born 2005)

Houston Astros
- Outfielder
- Born: April 27, 2005 (age 21); Daytona Beach, Florida, U.S.
- Bats: Left Throws: Left
- Stats at Baseball Reference

Logan James Hughes (born April 27, 2005) is an American professional baseball outfielder in the Houston Astros organization. He played college baseball for the Stetson Hatters and Texas Tech Red Raiders.

== Amateur career ==
Hughes attended Winter Springs High School in Winter Springs, Florida. He committed to play college baseball at Stetson University.

As a freshman at Stetson in 2024, Hughes started 46 of 58 games and hit .292/.398/.515 with eight home runs and 34 runs batted in (RBI) over 171 at bats. After the season he entered the transfer portal and transferred to the Texas Tech University.

In his first season at Texas Tech in 2025, Hughes 52 games and hit .327/.411/.697 with 19 home runs and 58 RBI over 211 at bats. After the season he played in the Cape Cod League for the Bourne Braves. As a junior in 2026, he started all 55 games, hitting .375/.510/.735 with 18 home runs and 70 RBI over 200 at bats. He was named a first team All-Big 12 and an All-American.

== Professional career ==
Hughes was considered a top prospect in the 2026 Major League Baseball draft. He was selected with the 17th pick in the draft by the Houston Astros. On July 22, 2026, he signed with the Astros for an under-slot signing bonus of approximately $3.41 million.

== Personal life ==
Hughes grew up near the Astros spring training complex in Kissimmee, Florida, where his mother, Melissa, frequently sang The Star-Spangled Banner. He idolized Jeff Bagwell as a child.
