= Liam Peterson =

American baseball player (born 2005)

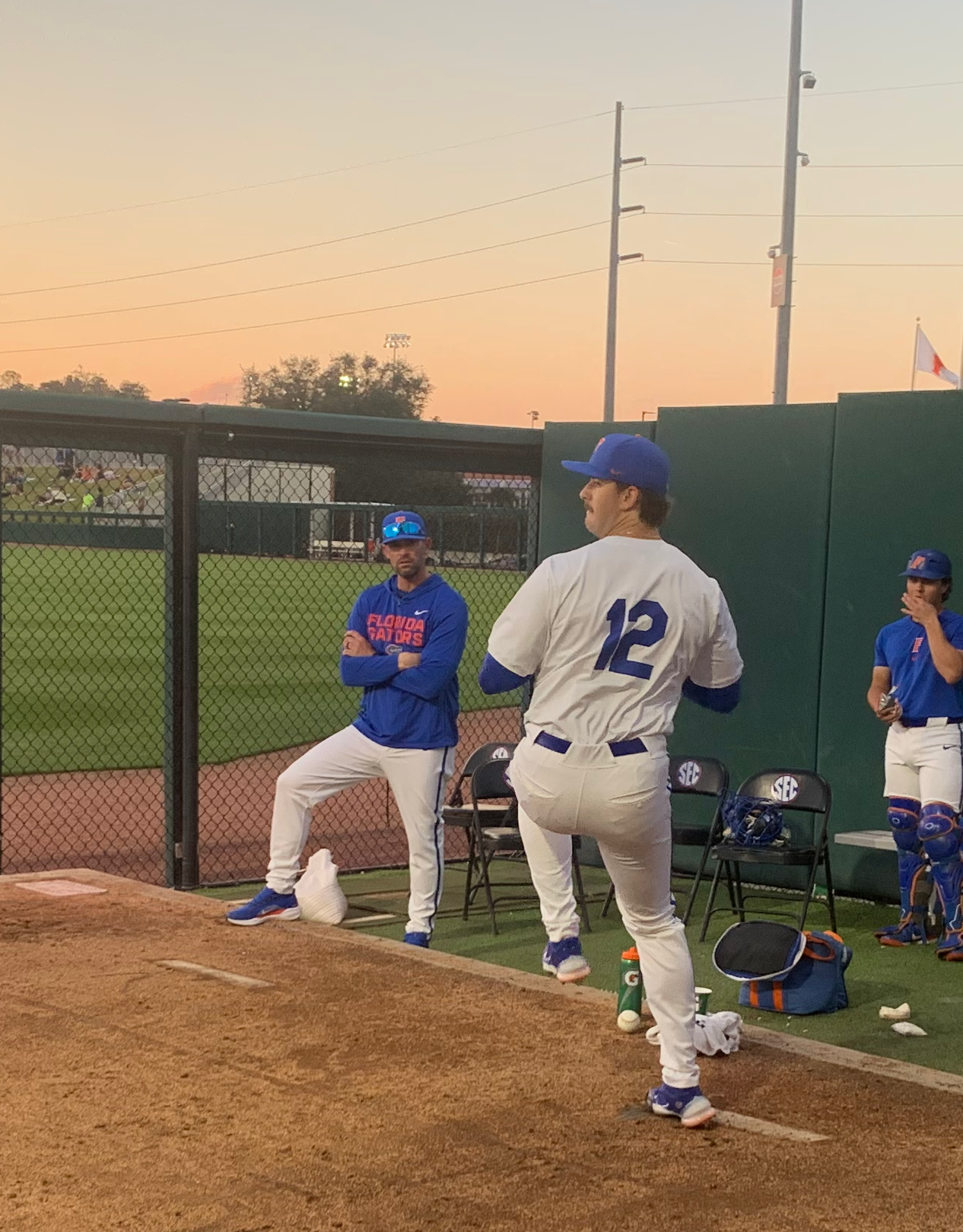
- Peterson with the Florida Gators in 2026

Cleveland Guardians
- Pitcher
- Born: June 10, 2005 (age 21); Clearwater, Florida, U.S.
- Bats: Right Throws: Right
- Stats at Baseball Reference

Liam Scott Peterson (born June 10, 2005) is an American professional baseball pitcher in the Cleveland Guardians organization.

== Amateur career ==
Peterson was born on June 10, 2005, in Clearwater, Florida. His grandfather played college baseball and his mother played volleyball in college. He attended Calvary Christian Academy in Fort Lauderdale, where he played baseball as a pitcher. At Calvary Christian, he posted a record of 10–2 with an earned-run average (ERA) of 1.28 and 141 strikeouts in 76 2/3 innings across his last two years. In his senior season, he also was Calvary Christian's leading hitter with a batting average of .484 and five home runs, helping his team to the Class 3A State Championship while being named the 3A Player of the Year.

Although Peterson was considered a potential top-100 selection in the 2023 Major League Baseball draft, he opted to play college baseball for the Florida Gators rather than turning professional. After his first two starts at Florida in 2024, in which he had seven shutout innings and struck out 13 batters, he was named the Southeastern Conference (SEC) Co-Freshman of the Week. He appeared in 18 games in his freshman season for Florida, pitching 63 innings while posting a record of 3–6 and an ERA of 6.43. Peterson was named to the 2024 SEC All-Freshman team. As a sophomore in 2025, Peterson made 16 appearance and pitched 96 strikeouts in 69 1/3 innings, recording an ERA of 4.28 and a record of 8–4. He was a member of the USA Collegiate National Team in 2024 and 2025. In 2026, his junior season for the Gators, Peterson made 16 starts and had a 3–6 record, a 4.59 ERA, and 111 strikeouts across 84 1/3 innings pitched.

== Professional career ==
Peterson was regarded as a top prospect for the 2026 Major League Baseball draft. He was selected by the Cleveland Guardians in the first round with the 19th overall pick. He signed with the Guardians for a $4.5 million signing bonus.
