= Jarren Advincula =

American baseball player (born 2005)

Los Angeles Angels
- Second baseman
- Born: January 15, 2005 (age 21); Santa Clara, California, U.S.
- Bats: Left Throws: Right

Jarren Kay Advincula (born January 15, 2005) is an American professional baseball second baseman in the Los Angeles Angels organization. He played college baseball for the California Golden Bears and the Georgia Tech Yellow Jackets.

== Amateur career ==
=== High school career ===
Advincula attended Archbishop Mitty High School in San Jose, California. In his 2022 season as a junior, he hit .422 with 26 runs. Following the season, he was named to the 2022 All-Metro Baseball Team and 2022 All-West Catholic Athletic League First Team.

In his prep career, he had a career .412 batting average with 15 doubles, four triples and three home runs across three seasons.

=== College career ===
Advincula began his college baseball career with the California Golden Bears. He was named All-Pac-12 Conference as a freshman after batting .325 with five home runs, 31 RBIs, and 44 runs scored. After the season, Advincula played collegiate summer baseball for the Cotuit Kettleers of the Cape Cod Baseball League and won the league batting with a .392 average.

He was named second-team All-Atlantic Coast Conference as a sophomore after batting .342 with six home runs, 33 RBIs, and 48 runs scored. After the season, Advincula entered the NCAA Transfer Portal. He returned to play for Cotuit in 2025 and won the Outstanding Pro Prospect Award.

Advincula transferred to Georgia Tech before his junior season. He slashed .434/.503/.629 with 10 home runs and 66 RBI, tying Jay Payton for the best batting average in one season with more than 200 at-bats in program history. He led Division I with 111 hits to tie Christian Moore (2024) for the most hits by the Power 4 player in the BBCOR era, and become the player with the third most single season hits in school history following Jay Payton (129) and Nomar Garciaparra (119) in 1994. During the season, he recorded at least one hit in 57 games out of his 61 games and 29 games hitting streak, making it the second longest hitting streak in program history. Also he marked a 4.99 WAR, leading all infielders in the country.

== Professional career ==
Advincula was selected by the Los Angeles Angels in the second round with the 45th overall pick of the 2026 Major League Baseball draft.

== Personal life ==
Advincula's older brother, Jonah Advincula, is a baseball player who was drafted by the Cleveland Guardians in the 8th round of 2023 Major League Baseball draft.
