= Rocco Maniscalco =

American baseball player (born 2009)

St. Louis Cardinals
- Shortstop
- Born: May 1, 2009 (age 17); Birmingham, Alabama, U.S.
- Bats: Switch Throws: Right

Andrew Rocco Maniscalco (born May 1, 2009) is an American professional baseball shortstop in the St. Louis Cardinals organization.

== Amateur career ==
Maniscalco attended Oxford High School in Oxford, Alabama, where he played baseball. Originally set to graduate in 2027, he reclassified to the class of 2026, making him the youngest draft-eligible player for the upcoming MLB draft. As a senior in 2026, he hit .330 with four home runs, 39 RBI, and 45 stolen bases. He committed to play college baseball at Mississippi State University. After the high school season, he participated in the 2026 MLB Draft Combine at Chase Field.

== Professional career ==
Maniscalco was selected by the St. Louis Cardinals in the second round with the 50th overall pick of the 2026 Major League Baseball draft. At age 17 and two months, he became the youngest player ever selected in the MLB draft. He signed with the Cardinals for a $3.2 million signing bonus.

== Personal life ==
Manisalco's father, Matthew, was the first ever Alabama Mr. Baseball and was selected by the Tampa Bay Rays in the 2003 Major League Baseball draft.
