= Zion Rose =

American baseball player (born 2005)

Kansas City Royals
- Outfielder
- Born: May 26, 2005 (age 21); Chicago, Illinois, U.S.
- Bats: Right Throws: Right
- Stats at Baseball Reference

Zion Meki Rose (born May 26, 2005) is an American professional baseball outfielder in the Kansas City Royals organization.

== High school and college career ==
Rose attended Brother Rice High School in Chicago, Illinois before transferring to IMG Academy in Bradenton, Florida for his senior year. A catcher in high school, he was the 2022 Daily Southtown Baseball Player of the Year his junior year at Brother Rice after hitting .496 with four home runs, 39 runs batted in (RBI) and 31 stolen bases. In 2022 Rose competed in the High School All-American Game at Dodger Stadium and in 2023, he competed in the MLB DREAM Series. He committed to the University of Louisville to play college baseball.

As a freshman at Louisville in 2024, Rose started 43 of 44 games and hit .380/.455/.584 with five home runs and 32 RBI. During the summer, he played collegiate summer baseball with the Falmouth Commodores of the Cape Cod Baseball League. As a sophomore, he started 66 games and hit .310/.396/.552 with 13 home runs, 67 RBI and 31 stolen bases. After the season, he played for USA Baseball’s Collegiate National Team.

== Professional career ==
Rose was taken sixth overall by the Royals in the first round of the 2026 Major League Baseball draft and received a signing bonus of $5,809,575, below the $7,746,100 slot value of the pick. Rose was assigned to the High-A Quad Cities River Bandits of the Midwest League in August. In 19 games, he batted .268/.389/.338 with one home run and 11 RBIs, helping the River Bandits to a 2026 Midwest League championship victory over the Dayton Dragons. Rose has shown good plate discipline early in his career, with a low strikeout rate and high walk rate, in addition to the ability to generate high bat speed and exit velocity.

== Personal life ==
Rose is the son of Shaun and Karin Rose. He has two siblings: Cyress and Jahari. Rose is a Christian.
