= Southside Christian School =

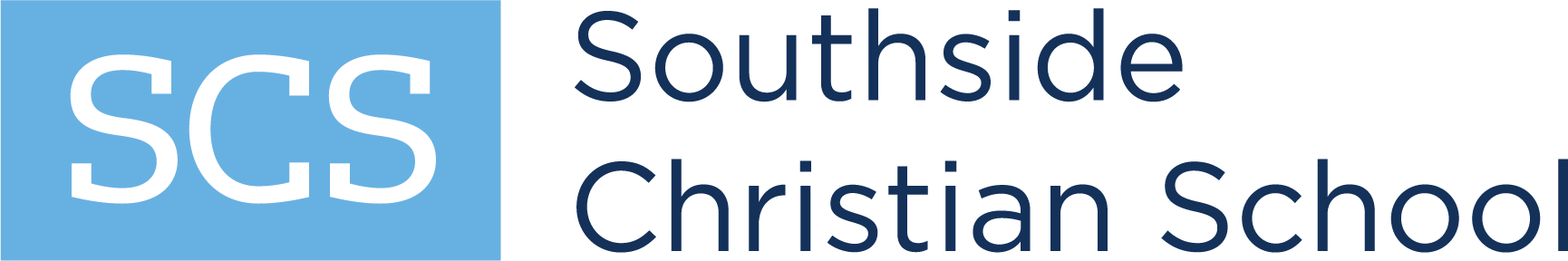

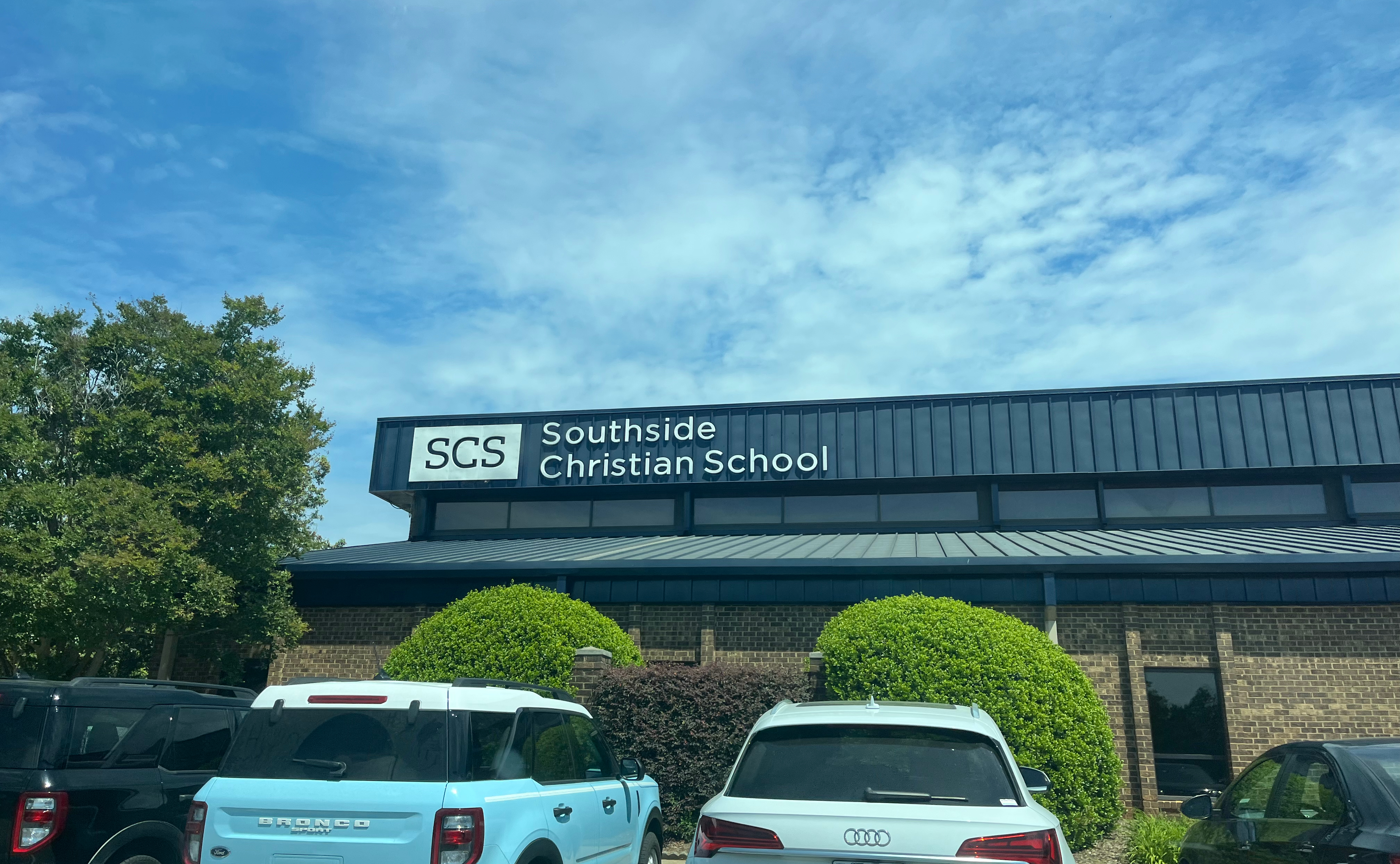

Location
- 2211 Woodruff Road; Simpsonville, South Carolina 29681; United States; 34.8208°N 82.2525°W

Information
- Other name: SCS
- Type: Private Christian
- Motto: Colossians 3:23–24
- Religious affiliation: Christian
- Established: 1967 (59 years ago)
- Founders: Pastor Walt and Libby Handford
- Superintendent: Sam Barfell
- Principal: Brian Smith (high school); Luke Bowers (middle school); Eric Alfrey (elementary); Stephanie Breit (early ed.)
- Faculty: 110
- Grades: K2–12
- Enrollment: 1,402 (2025-26)
- Student to teacher ratio: 12:1
- Campus: 39.1 acres (158,000 m^{2})
- Colors: Columbia blue, navy blue, and white
- Athletics conference: SCHSL 3A
- Nickname: Sabres
- Website: www.southsidechristian.org

Southside Christian School is a private PreK–12 Christian school in Simpsonville, South Carolina. SCS was established in 1967 and is accredited by the Association of Christian Schools International. SCS serves approximately 1,400 students beginning at 24 months of age and continuing through 12th grade on one campus. Students are divided into Early Education (K2–K5), Elementary School (Kindergarten–5th), Middle School (6th–8th), and High School (9th–12th).

== History ==
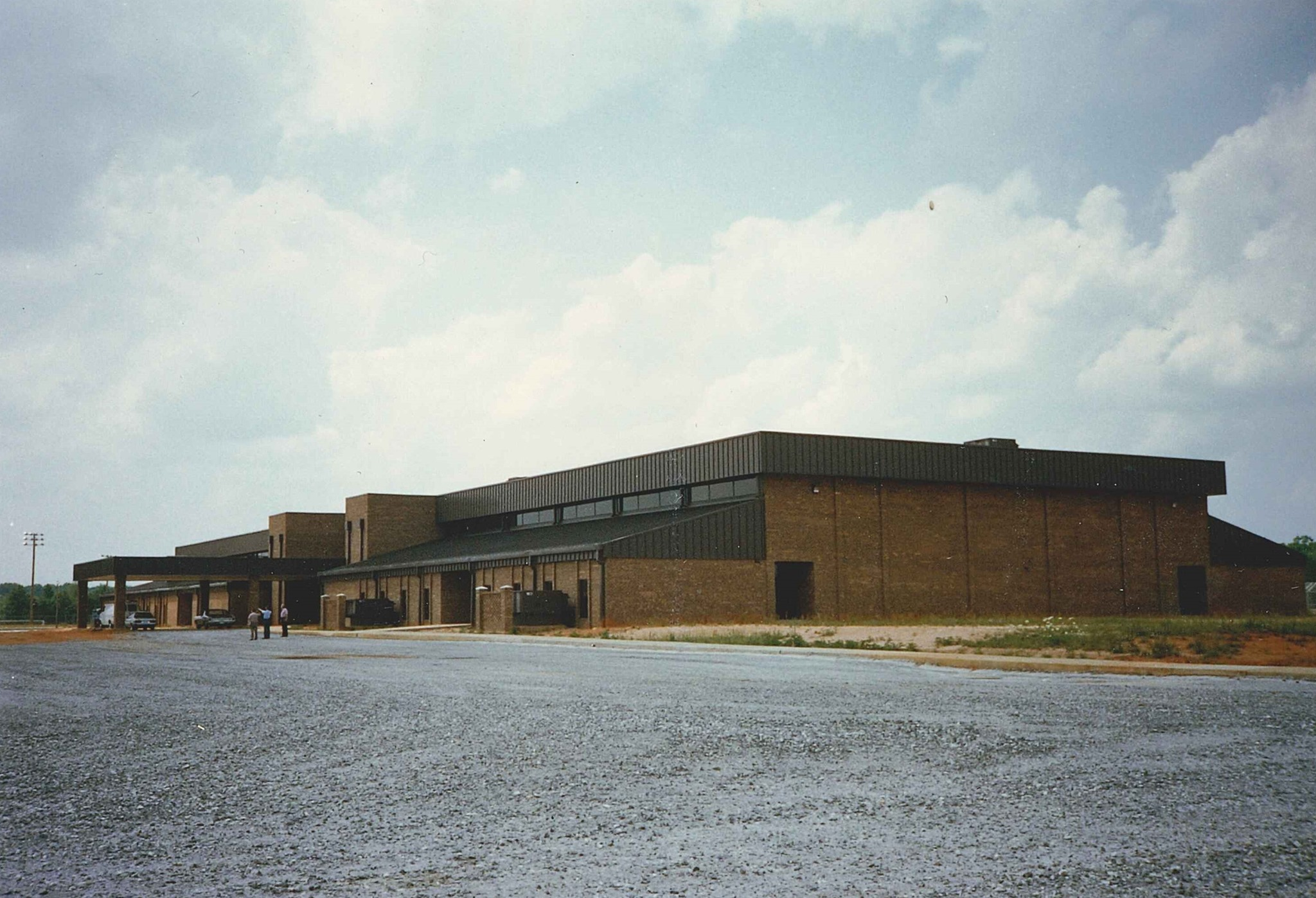
Southside Christian School in the 1970s

Southside Christian School was one of five all-white private schools that were established in Greenville County between 1966 and 1970 when Greenville public schools were being desegregated. Southside Christian School officials, however, have denied that school was established to facilitate racially segregated education.

In 1978, Southside Christian School administrator Ron Brooks spoke at a conference organized by opponents of an IRS regulation that would revoke the tax exemptions of private schools that had significantly different racial composition than the surrounding community. Brooks said that it was "wrong for the government to get involved in our church" and that the school did not "keep track of students by race". Brooks argued that since Southside Christian School was formed before the final court order desegregating Greenville schools, the school was not a discriminatory institution.

In 2002, Southside Christian School received inquiries from parents seeking to withdraw their children from public schools after a racially charged debate on school assignment zone changes.

The school's gymnasium was destroyed in a fire on November 20, 2002.

In April 2022, Southside Christian School broke ground for a $20 million campus expansion of 63,000 square feet (5,900 m^{2}).

== Sports ==
SCS is a 3A member of the South Carolina High School League, with boys and girls teams competing in 19 sports.

- In 2000, 2005, 2009, 2010, 2020, and 2021, the Lady Sabre volleyball team won the Class A State Championship.
- In 2015, 2020, and 2021, the varsity football team won the Class A State Championship.
- In 2022, 2023, 2024, 2025, and 2026, the varsity baseball team won five consecutive State Championships, with the two most recent being 3A titles and the others being Class A.
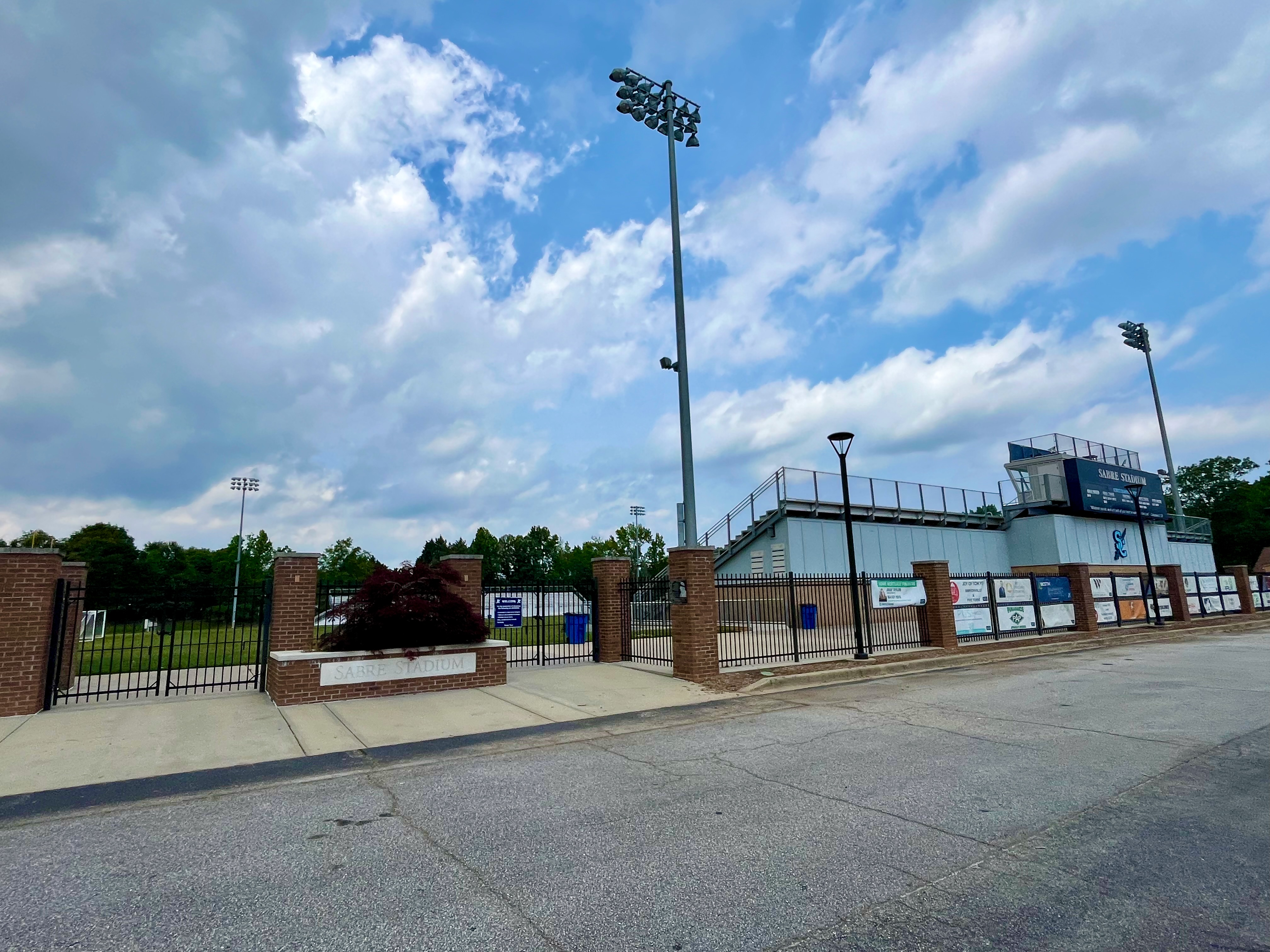
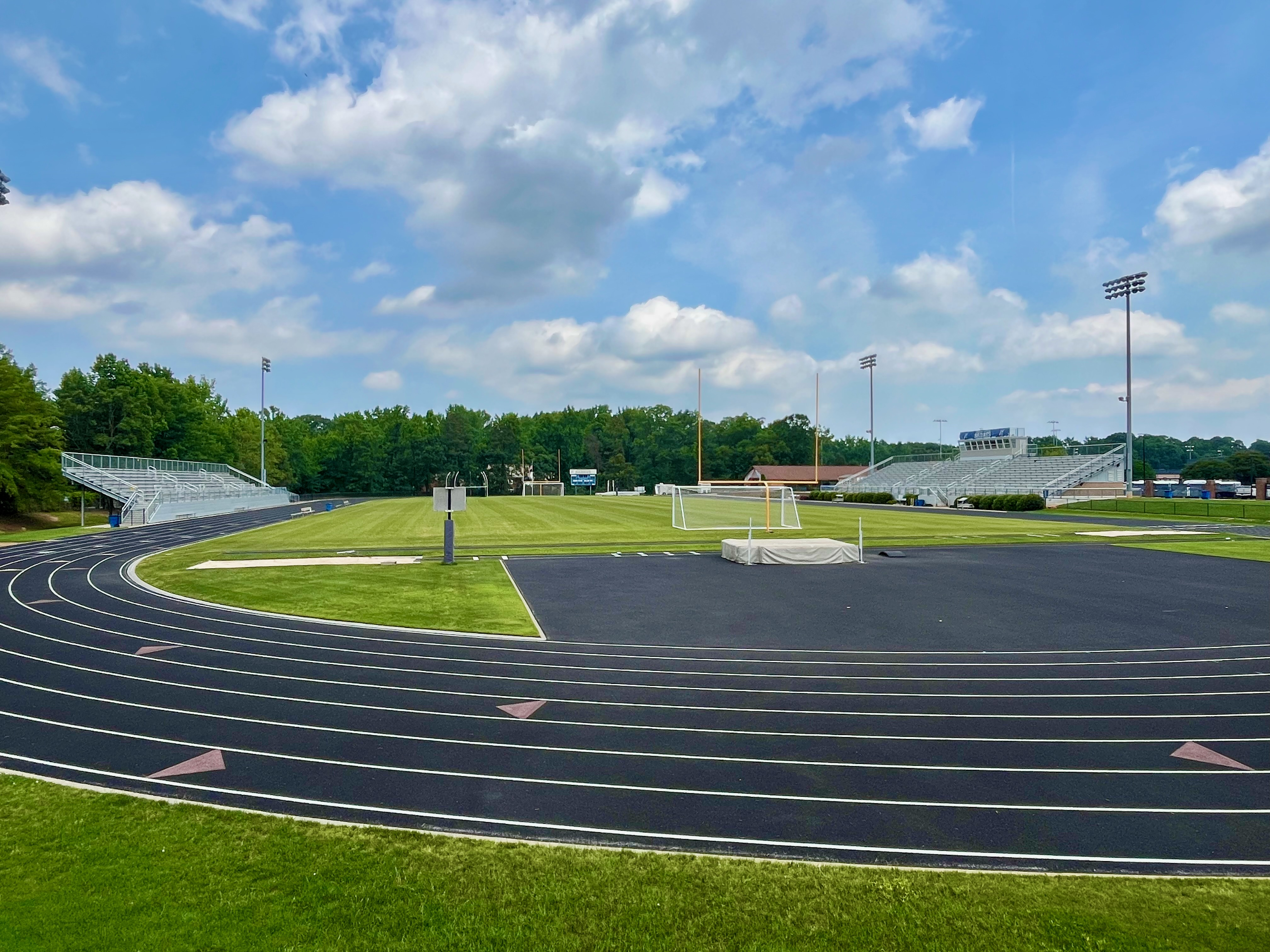
Sabre Stadium

=== Boys ===
- Baseball
- Basketball
- Cross Country
- Football
- Golf
- Soccer
- Swimming
- Tennis
- Track and Field
- Wrestling

=== Girls ===
- Basketball
- Cheerleading
- Cross Country
- Fastpitch Softball
- Golf
- Soccer
- Swimming
- Tennis
- Track and Field
- Volleyball

== Notable alumni ==
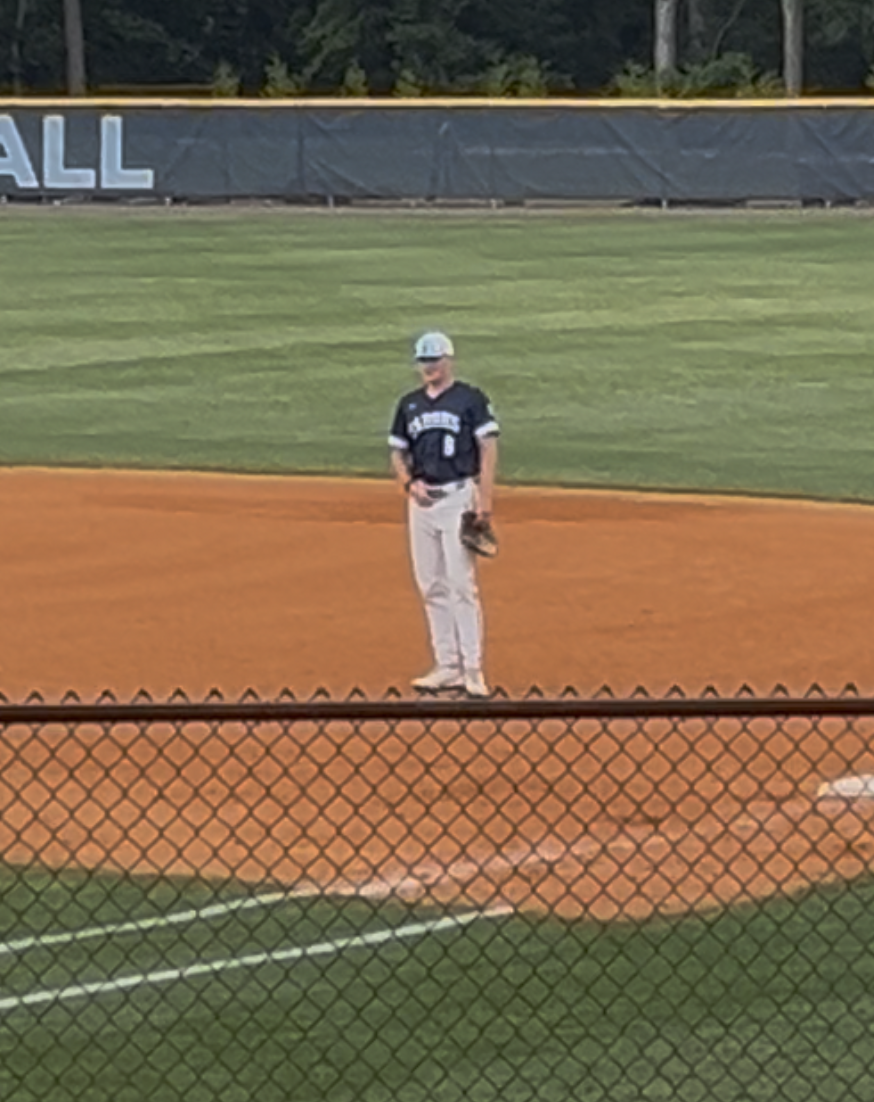
Carson Bolemon playing for the Sabres

- Carson Bolemon (class of 2026) – pitcher for the 2025 U-18 Baseball World Cup and player within the San Francisco Giants organization

== Gallery ==
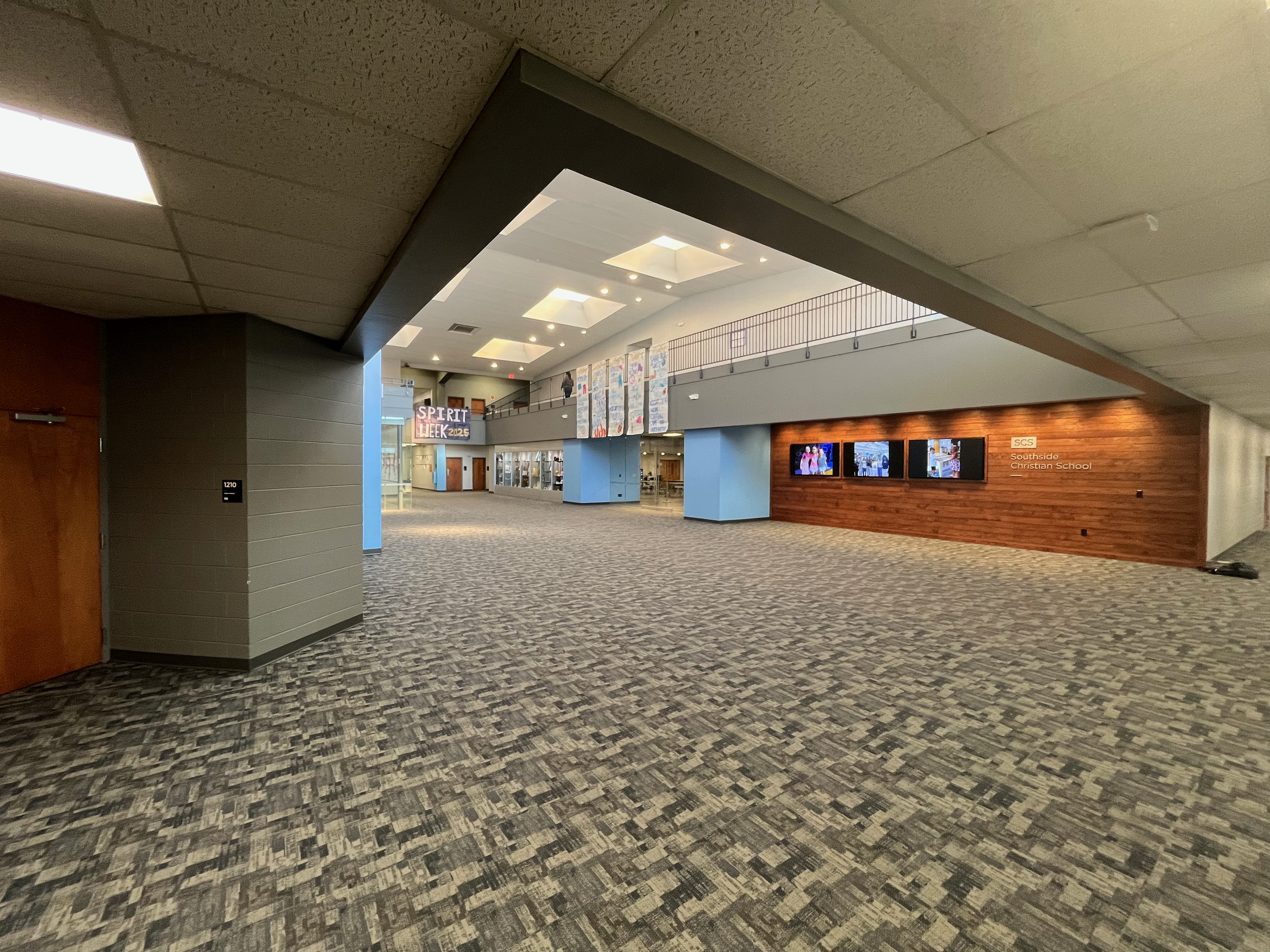
Main lobby

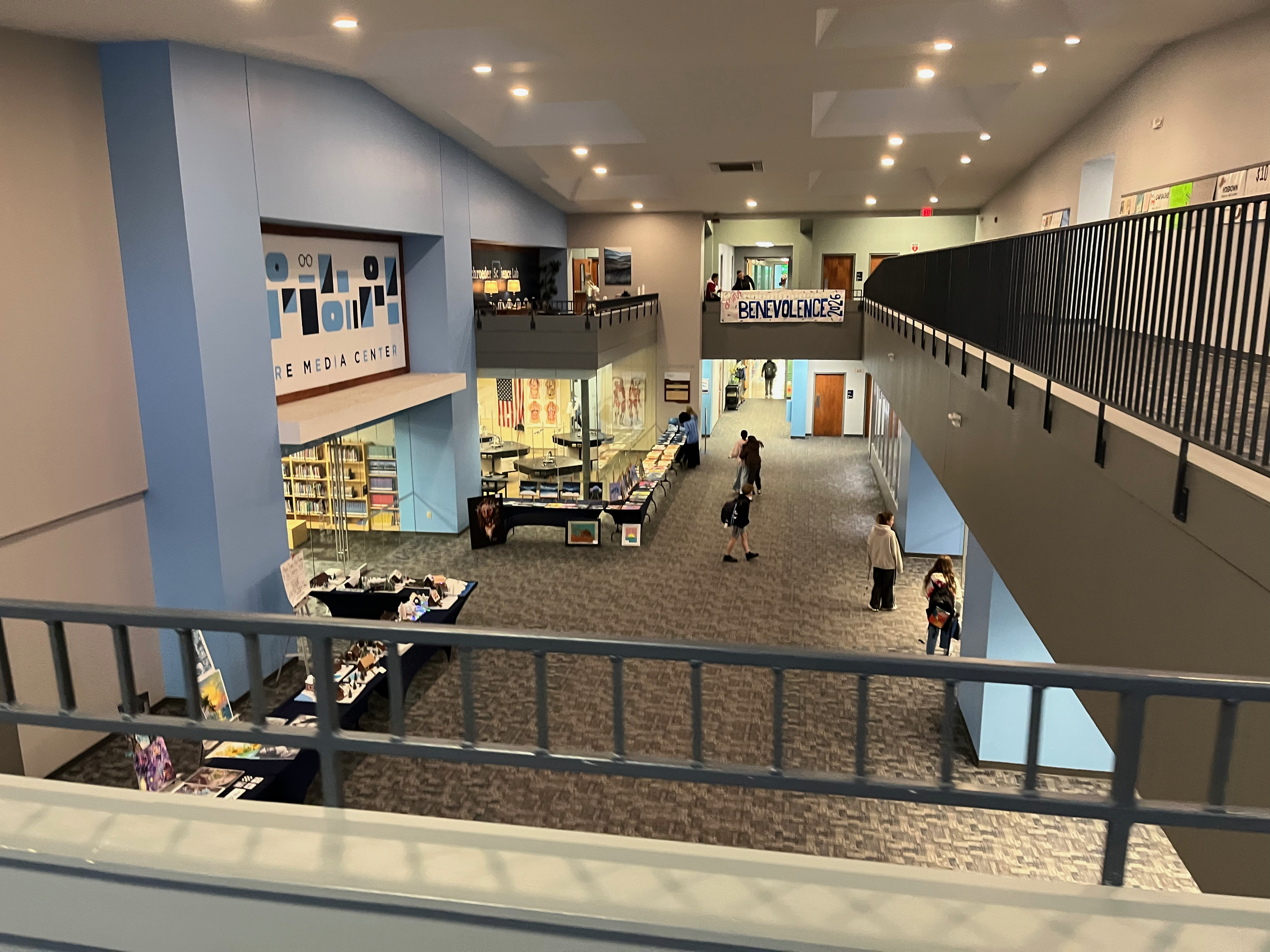
Balcony

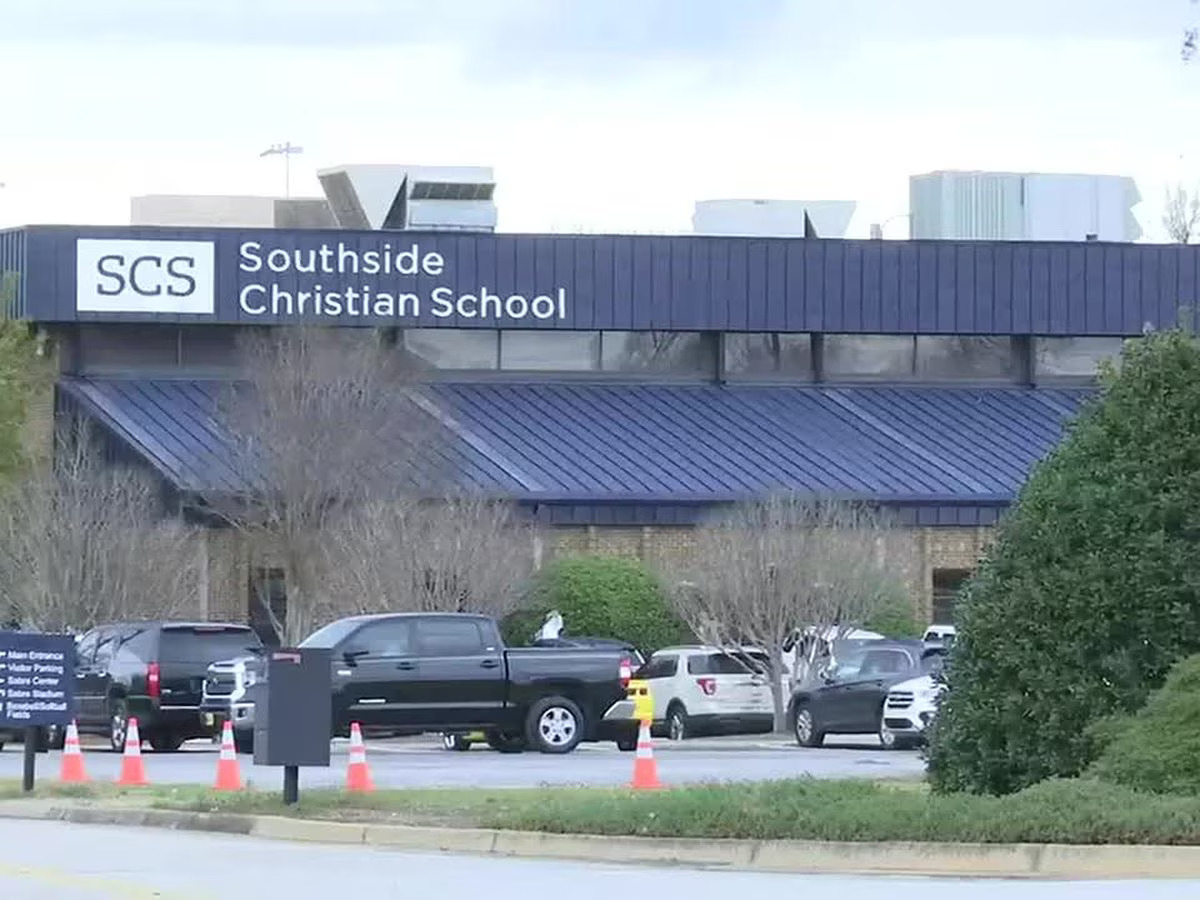
Exterior

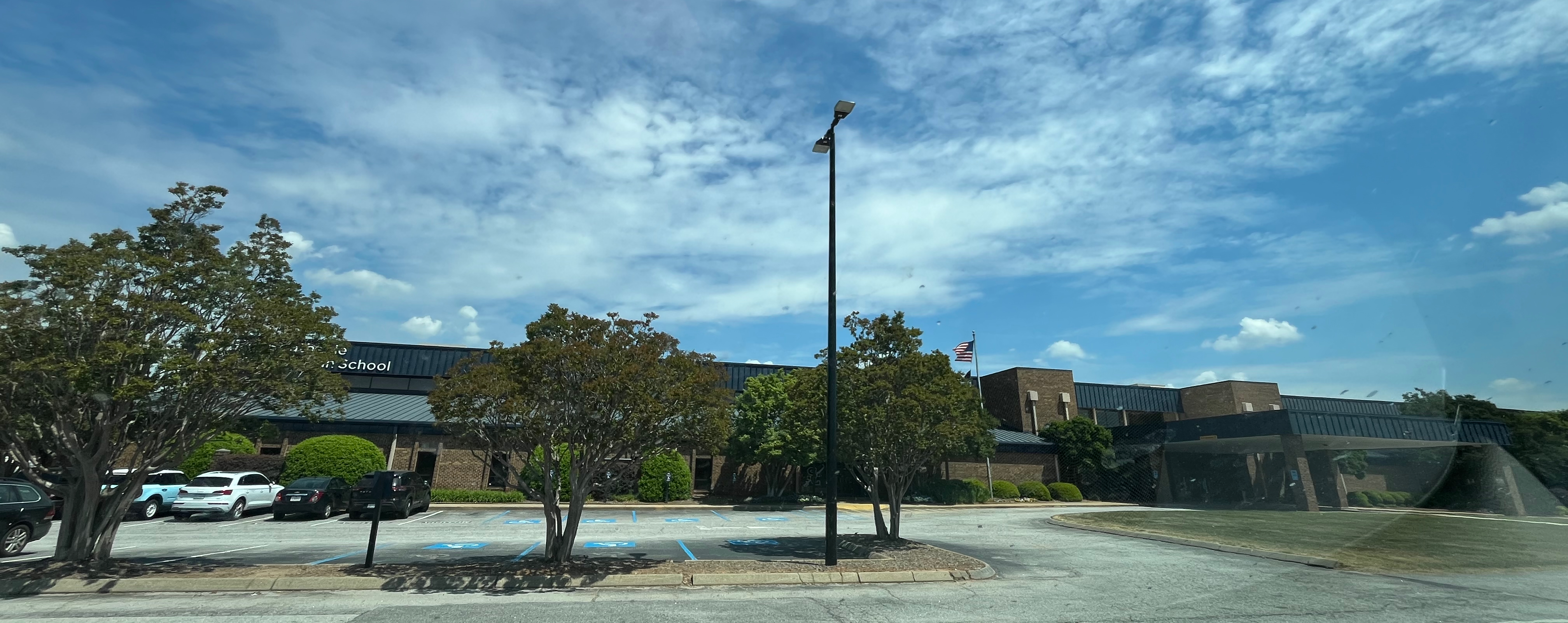
Wide view
