= Cade Townsend =

American baseball player (born 2005)

Chicago Cubs
- Pitcher
- Born: May 5, 2005 (age 21); Newport Beach, California, U.S.
- Bats: Right Throws: Right
- Stats at Baseball Reference

Caden Scott Townsend (born May 5, 2005) is an American professional baseball pitcher in the Chicago Cubs organization.

== Career ==
Townsend attended Santa Margarita Catholic High School in Rancho Santa Margarita, California. As a senior, he was The Orange County Register Pitcher of the Year and Trinity League Pitcher of the Year after going 6–0 with a 1.56 earned run average (ERA) and 96 strikeouts. He committed to the University of Mississippi (Ole Miss) to play college baseball.

As a freshman at Ole Miss, Towsend pitched in 15 games with eight starts and went 1–0 with a 6.35 ERA and 43 strikeouts in 34 innings. He returned to Ole Miss as a starting pitcher his sophomore year in 2026. He missed time during the season due to an injury.

Townsend is a top prospect for the 2026 MLB draft. Townsend was selected by the Chicago Cubs in the first round (23rd overall) of the 2026 Major League Baseball draft. He later signed a signing bonus of $3.1 million with the Cubs.
