= Carson Bolemon =

American baseball player (born 2007)

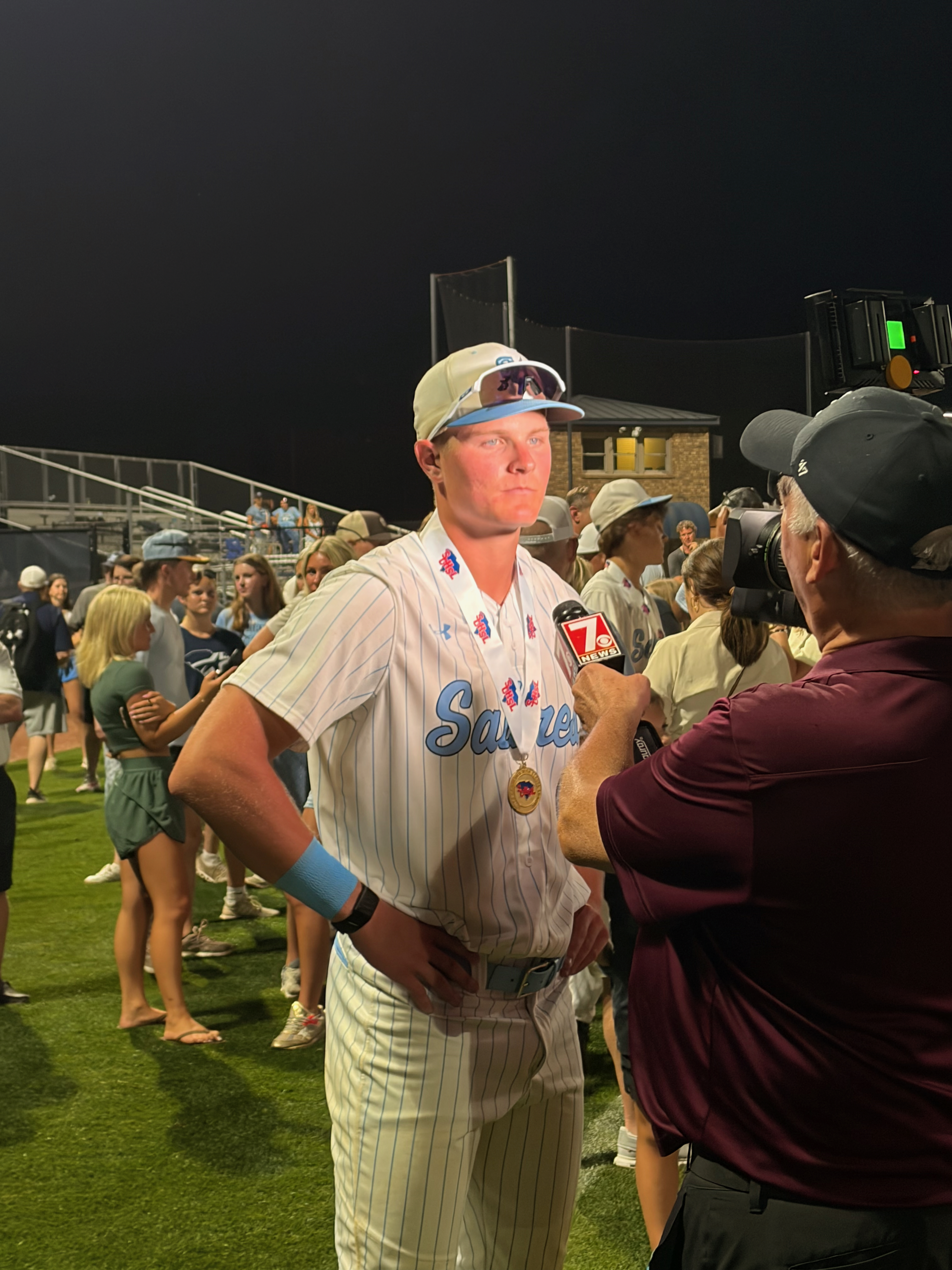
- Bolemon in 2026

San Francisco Giants – No. 6
- Pitcher
- Born: April 5, 2007 (age 19); Simpsonville, South Carolina, U.S.
- Bats: Right Throws: Left

Career highlights and awards
- Gatorade Player of the Year – South Carolina baseball
Medals
Men's baseball
Representing United States
U-18 Baseball World Cup
Gold medal – first place	2025 Naha-Itoman	Team

Carson James Bolemon (born April 5, 2007) is an American professional baseball pitcher. He was selected by the San Francisco Giants with the 29th overall pick in the 2026 MLB draft.

== Career ==
Bolemon played high school baseball for Southside Christian School in Simpsonville, South Carolina, a private school where he won the South Carolina State Championship five times in a row from 2022 to 2026. In 2025, as a junior for Southside Christian, he had a 0.00 earned run average (ERA), 101 strikeouts and six walks in 42 1/3 innings, pitched a no-hitter with 19 strikeouts in the Class AAA state championship, and was named the Gatorade South Carolina Baseball Player of the Year. As a senior in 2026, he had a 0.17 ERA with 91 strikeouts and was named the Gatorade South Carolina Baseball Player of the Year for the second consecutive season. Bolemon committed to play college baseball for the Wake Forest Demon Deacons.

Bolemon played for the United States national under-15 baseball team in 2022 and for the United States national under-18 baseball team in 2025. Bolemon pitched in the 2025 U-18 Baseball World Cup, going 2–0 with a 0.00 ERA and 17 strikeouts. On September 6, 2025, he pitched 11 strikeouts and two walks against Chinese Taipei, achieving the first Baseball World Cup no-hitter for the United States in 30 years.

Bolemon was considered a top prospect for the 2026 Major League Baseball draft and was projected to be one of the first pitchers selected, specifically due to throwing left. He was selected by the San Francisco Giants with the 29th overall pick.
