= Walton Beach =

Walton Beach may refer to:

- Fort Walton Beach, Florida
- The beaches of Walton County, Florida on the Emerald Coast
- Walton-on-the-Naze, UK
