= Taylor Rabe =

American baseball player (born 2005)

Kansas City Royals
- Pitcher
- Born: August 27, 2004 (age 21); Greenville, South Carolina, U.S.
- Bats: Right Throws: Right
- Stats at Baseball Reference

Taylor David Rabe (born August 27, 2004) is an American professional baseball pitcher in the Kansas City Royals organization. He was selected by the Royals in the first round of the 2026 MLB draft.

== Career ==
Rabe attended Greenville Senior High School in Greenville, South Carolina. As a senior, he was the South Carolina Gatorade Baseball Player of the Year after going 8–0 with a 1.19 earned run average (ERA) and 101 strikeouts over 53 innings. He committed to the University of Mississippi (Ole Miss) to play college baseball.

Rabe underwent Tommy John Surgery prior to this freshman season at Ole Miss in 2024 and did not pitch that season. He returned from the injury to pitch in 15 games with two starts in 2025, going 0-1 with a 4.41 ERA and eight strikeouts over 16 1/3 innings. Rabe entered 2026 as a relief pitcher before transitioning into a starter during the season and helped lead Ole Miss to the College World Series.

Rabe was considered a top prospect for the 2026 MLB draft and was drafted by the Kansas City Royals in the first round with the 30th overall selection.
