= 2009 Korean Series =

The 2009 Korean Series was the 27th edition of Korea Baseball Organization's championship series. The best-of-seven playoff is played between the KIA Tigers (1st) and the SK Wyverns (2nd). The KIA Tigers won the series in seven games.

== Game summaries ==
=== Game 1 ===
Friday, October 16, 2009, at Moodeung Stadium in Gwangju

Team	1	2	3	4	5	6	7	8	9	R	H	E
SK Wyverns	0	0	1	1	0	0	1	0	0	3	6	0
Kia Tigers	0	0	0	1	0	2	0	2	X	5	6	2
WP: Aquilino López (1-0) LP: Lee Seung-Ho (0-1) Sv: Yoo Dong-Hoon; Home runs: SK: Chung Sang-Ho (1); KIA: None

=== Game 2 ===
Saturday, October 17, 2009, at Moodeung Stadium in Gwangju

Team	1	2	3	4	5	6	7	8	9	R	H	E
SK Wyverns	0	0	0	0	0	0	0	0	1	1	10	0
Kia Tigers	0	0	0	1	0	1	0	0	X	2	5	0
WP: Yoon Suk-Min (1-0) LP: Song Eun-Beom (0-1) Sv: Yoo Dong-Hoon; Home runs: SK: Chung Sang-Ho (2); KIA: None

=== Game 3 ===
Monday, October 19, 2009, at Munhak Baseball Stadium in Incheon

Team	1	2	3	4	5	6	7	8	9	R	H	E
Kia Tigers	0	0	0	0	0	0	1	3	2	6	7	0
SK Wyverns	1	1	2	0	4	0	0	3	X	11	12	1
WP: Lee Seung-Ho (1-1) LP: Rick Guttormson (0-1); Home runs: KIA: Kim Sang-Hyun (3); SK: Park Jeong-kwon (2), Cho Dong-hwa (1)

=== Game 4 ===
Tuesday, October 20, 2009, at Munhak Baseball Stadium in Incheon

Team	1	2	3	4	5	6	7	8	9	R	H	E
Kia Tigers	0	0	0	0	0	1	0	0	2	3	9	0
SK Wyverns	0	2	0	0	1	0	0	1	X	4	7	1
WP: Chae Byeong-yong (1-0) LP: Yang Hyeon-Jong (0-1) Sv: Yoon Kil-hyun; Home runs: KIA: Lee Hyun-Gon (1); SK: Park Jae-Hong (2)

=== Game 5 ===
Thursday, October 22, 2009, at Jamsil Baseball Stadium in Seoul

Team	1	2	3	4	5	6	7	8	9	R	H	E
SK Wyverns	0	0	0	0	0	0	0	0	0	0	4	2
Kia Tigers	0	0	1	0	0	2	0	0	X	3	7	1
WP: Aquilino López (2-0) LP: Ken Kadokura (0-1)

=== Game 6 ===
Friday, October 23, 2009, at Jamsil Baseball Stadium in Seoul

Team	1	2	3	4	5	6	7	8	9	R	H	E
Kia Tigers	0	0	0	0	0	0	0	2	0	2	9	0
SK Wyverns	0	1	1	1	0	0	0	0	X	3	11	0
WP: Song Eun-Beom (1-1) LP: Yoon Suk-Min (1-1) Sv: Chae Byeong-yong; Home runs: KIA: None; SK: Lee Ho-jun (1)

=== Game 7 ===
Saturday, October 24, 2009, at Jamsil Baseball Stadium in Seoul

Team	1	2	3	4	5	6	7	8	9	R	H	E
SK Wyverns	0	0	0	2	1	2	0	0	0	5	10	0
Kia Tigers	0	0	0	0	1	2	2	0	1	6	8	0
WP: Yoo Dong-Hoon (1-0) LP: Chae Byeong-yong (1-1); Home runs: SK: Park Jeong-kwon (2); KIA: Na Ji-Wan (2, 6 inning), An Chi-Hong (1), Na Ji-Wan (1, 9 inning)
