= KBO League Rookie of the Year Award =

The KBO League Rookie of the Year Award is given to the player judged the best first-year player in the Korea Baseball Organization (KBO) League. The most recent winner is Ahn Hyun-min of the KT Wiz.

== Award winners ==
Year	Player	Team	Position	Ref
1983	Park Jong-hoon	OB Bears	Outfielder	
1984	Yun Seog-hwan	OB Bears	Pitcher	
1985	Lee Sun-cheol	Haitai Tigers	Infielder	
1986	Kim Keon-woo	MBC Chungyong	Pitcher	
1987	Lee Jeong-hun	Binggrae Eagles	Outfielder	
1988	Lee Yong-chul	MBC Chungyong	Pitcher	
1989	Park Jeong-hyeon	Pacific Dolphins	Pitcher	
1990	Kim Dong-soo	LG Twins	Catcher	
1991	Cho Kyu-je	Ssangbangwool Raiders	Pitcher	
1992	Yeom Jong-seok	Lotte Giants	Pitcher	
1993	Yang Joon-hyuk	Samsung Lions	Infielder	
1994	Yu Ji-hyeon	LG Twins	Infielder	
1995	Lee Dong-su	Samsung Lions	Infielder	
1996	Park Jae-hong	Hyundai Unicorns	Outfielder	
1997	Lee Byung-kyu	LG Twins	Outfielder	
1998	Kim Soo-kyung	Hyundai Unicorns	Pitcher	
1999	Hong Sung-heon	Doosan Bears	Catcher	
2000	Lee Seung-ho	SK Wyverns	Pitcher	
2001	Kim Tae-kyun	Hanwha Eagles	Infielder	
2002	Cho Yong-jun	Hyundai Unicorns	Pitcher	
2003	Lee Dong-hak	Hyundai Unicorns	Pitcher	
2004	Oh Ju-won	Hyundai Unicorns	Pitcher	
2005	Oh Seung-hwan	Samsung Lions	Pitcher	
2006	Ryu Hyun-jin	Hanwha Eagles	Pitcher	
2007	Im Tae-hoon	Doosan Bears	Pitcher	
2008	Choi Hyoung-woo	Samsung Lions	Outfielder	
2009	Lee Yong-chan	Doosan Bears	Pitcher	
2010	Yang Eui-ji	Doosan Bears	Catcher	
2011	Bae Yeong-seob	Samsung Lions	Outfielder	
2012	Seo Geon-chang	Nexen Heroes	Infielder	
2013	Lee Jae-hak	NC Dinos	Pitcher	
2014	Park Min-woo	NC Dinos	Infielder	
2015	Koo Ja-wook	Samsung Lions	Infielder	
2016	Shin Jae-young	Nexen Heroes	Pitcher	
2017	Lee Jung-hoo	Nexen Heroes	Outfielder	
2018	Kang Baek-ho	KT Wiz	Outfielder	
2019	Jung Woo-young	LG Twins	Pitcher	
2020	So Hyeong-jun	KT Wiz	Pitcher	
2021	Lee Eui-lee	Kia Tigers	Pitcher	
2022	Jeong Cheol-won	Doosan Bears	Pitcher	
2023	Moon Dong-ju	Hanwha Eagles	Pitcher	
2024	Kim Taek-yeon	Doosan Bears	Pitcher	
2025	Ahn Hyun-min	KT Wiz	Outfielder	
