= 2009 Korea Professional Baseball season =

CJ Magumagu Pro Baseball 2009 2009 CJ 마구마구 프로야구
- League: Korea Professional Baseball
- Sport: Baseball
- Duration: April 4, 2009 – October 24, 2009
- Games: 133 per team
- Teams: 8

Regular Season
- Season champions: Kia Tigers
- Season MVP: Kim Sang-Hyun (Kia)

League Postseason
- Semiplayoff champions: Doosan Bears
- Semiplayoff runners-up: Lotte Giants
- Playoff champions: SK Wyverns
- Playoff runners-up: Doosan Bears

Korean Series
- Champions: Kia Tigers
- Runners-up: SK Wyverns
- Finals MVP: Na Ji-Wan (Kia)

KBO seasons
- ← 2008 2010 →

The 2009 Korea Professional Baseball season, officially known as CJ Magumagu Pro Baseball 2009 (Korean: 2009 CJ 마구마구 프로야구) for sponsorship reasons, was the 26th season in the history of Korea Professional Baseball, now known as KBO League.

The Kia Tigers won the regular season and the Korean Series.

== Format ==
=== Season format ===
- Regular season: 133 games for each team
- Semiplayoff: regular-season 3rd place vs. regular-season 4th place – best of 5
- Playoff: regular-season second place vs. semiplayoff winner – best of 5
- Korean Series: regular-season first place vs. playoff winner – best of 7

=== Final standings ===
- Champion (1st place): Korean Series winner
- Runner-up (2nd place): Korean Series loser
- 3rd–8th place: sort by regular-season record except teams to play in the Korean Series

== Pre-season ==
Rank	Team	W	L	D	Pct.	GB
1	Lotte Giants	11	1	0	0.917	-
2	LG Twins	9	3	0	0.750	2.0
3	Doosan Bears	8	4	0	0.667	3.0
4	Hanwha Eagles	5	7	0	0.417	6.0
5	Kia Tigers	5	8	0	0.385	6.5
6	SK Wyverns	5	9	0	0.357	7.0
7	Nexen Heroes	4	8	0	0.333	7.0
8	Samsung Lions	3	10	0	0.231	8.5

== Regular season ==
Rank	Team	G	W	D	L	Pct.	GB
1	Kia Tigers	133	81	4	48	0.609	-
2	SK Wyverns	133	80	6	47	0.602	1
3	Doosan Bears	133	71	2	60	0.534	10
4	Lotte Giants	133	66	0	67	0.496	15
5	Samsung Lions	133	64	0	69	0.481	17
6	Nexen Heroes	133	60	1	72	0.451	21
7	LG Twins	133	54	4	75	0.406	27
8	Hanwha Eagles	133	46	3	84	0.341	35

Pennant Race Winner

KIA Tigers

== Post-season ==
=== Semiplayoff ===
Doosan Bears win the series, 3-1

Game	Score	Date	Location	Attendance
1	Doosan Bears 2 - 7 Lotte Giants	September 29	Jamsil Baseball Stadium	29,000 (Sellout)
2	Doosan Bears 6 - 0 Lotte Giants	September 30	Jamsil Baseball Stadium	29,000 (Sellout)
3	Lotte Giants 3 - 12 Doosan Bears	October 2	Sajik Baseball Stadium	28,500 (Sellout)
4	Lotte Giants 5 - 9 Doosan Bears	October 3	Sajik Baseball Stadium	28,500 (Sellout)

=== Playoff ===
SK Wyverns win the series, 3-2

Game	Score	Date	Location	Attendance
1	SK Wyverns 2 - 3 Doosan Bears	October 7	Munhak Baseball Stadium	21,078
2	SK Wyverns 1 - 4 Doosan Bears	October 8	Munhak Baseball Stadium	20,627
3	Doosan Bears 1 - 3 SK Wyverns	October 10	Jamsil Baseball Stadium	29,000 (Sellout)
4	Doosan Bears 3 - 8 SK Wyverns	October 11	Jamsil Baseball Stadium	29,000 (Sellout)
5	SK Wyverns 14 - 3 Doosan Bears	October 14	Munhak Baseball Stadium	27,800 (Sellout)

=== Korean Series ===
Kia Tigers win the series, 4-3

Game	Score	Date	Location	Attendance
1	Kia Tigers 5 - 3 SK Wyverns	October 16	Moodeung Stadium	13,400 (Sellout)
2	Kia Tigers 2 - 1 SK Wyverns	October 17	Moodeung Stadium	13,400 (Sellout)
3	SK Wyverns 11 - 6 Kia Tigers	October 19	Munhak Baseball Stadium	27,800 (Sellout)
4	SK Wyverns 4 - 3 Kia Tigers	October 20	Munhak Baseball Stadium	27,800 (Sellout)
5	Kia Tigers 3 - 0 SK Wyverns	October 22	Jamsil Baseball Stadium	29,000 (Sellout)
6	SK Wyverns 3 - 2 Kia Tigers	October 23	Jamsil Baseball Stadium	29,000 (sellout)
7	Kia Tigers 6 - 5 SK Wyverns	October 24	Jamsil Baseball Stadium	29,000 (Sellout)

2009 Korean Series Winner

Kia Tigers
Tenth title

== Final standings ==
Place	Team
1	Kia Tigers
2	SK Wyverns
3	Doosan Bears
4	Lotte Giants
5	Samsung Lions
6	Nexen Heroes
7	LG Twins
8	Hanwha Eagles

== Statistics ==
=== Teams statistics ===
Final

Team	Team BA	Team ERA	Runs Scored	Runs Allowed	HR
Kia Tigers	.267	3.92	706	581	156
SK Wyverns	.285	3.67	732	550	166
Doosan Bears	.280	4.60	722	662	120
Lotte Giants	.277	4.75	637	669	121
Samsung Lions	.275	4.98	685	700	146
Nexen Heroes	.272	5.40	683	762	153
LG Twins	.278	5.42	670	763	129
Hanwha Eagles	.269	5.70	657	805	164
Total			5,492	5,492	1,155

=== Personal statistics ===
Hitters TOP

Category	Player	Record
AVG	Park Yong-taik (LG Twins)	0.372
HR	Kim Sang-hyun (Kia Tigers)	36
RBI	Kim Sang-hyun (Kia Tigers)	127
R	Jeong Keun-Woo (SK Wyverns); Hee-seop Choi (Kia Tigers)	98
H	Hyun-soo Kim (Doosan Bears)	172
SB	Lee Dae-Hyung (LG Twins)	64

Pitchers TOP

Category	Player	Record
W	Yoon Sung-Hwan (Samsung Lions); Cho Jung-Hoon (Lotte Giants); Aquilino López (Kia Tigers)	14
ERA	Kim Kwang-Hyun (SK Wyverns)	2.80
SO	Ryu Hyun-Jin (Hanwha Eagles)	188
IP	Aquilino López (Kia Tigers)	190 1/3
SV	Jon Adkins (Lotte Giants); Lee Yong-Chan (Doosan Bears)	26
HLD	Kwon Hyuk (Samsung Lions)	21

== Foreign hitters ==
Team	Player	Position	In KBO since	Batting Average	Home runs	RBI	Notes
Doosan Bears	Matt Watson	OF	2009	.184	2	6	
Hanwha Eagles	Víctor Díaz	OF	2009	.266	15	39	
Kia Tigers	NONE	N/A					
LG Twins	Roberto Petagine	1B	2008	.332	26	100	
Lotte Giants	Karim García	OF	2008	.266	29	84	
Samsung Lions	NONE	N/A					
Seoul Heroes	Cliff Brumbaugh	OF	2003	.245	27	86	
Seoul Heroes	Doug Clark	OF	2008	.290	24	90	
SK Wyverns	NONE	N/A					Team had 3 pitchers
