= Lee Hyun-gon =

South Korean baseball player & coach (born 1980)

Lee Hyun-Gon

NC Dinos – No. 31
- Shortstop / Third baseman / Coach
- Born: February 21, 1980 (age 45)
- Batted: Right Threw: Right

KBO debut
- May 2, 2002, for the Kia Tigers

Last KBO appearance
- 2014, for the NC Dinos

KBO statistics
- Batting average: .272
- Home runs: 23
- Runs batted in: 267
- Stats at Baseball Reference

Teams
- As player: Kia Tigers (2002–2012); NC Dinos (2013–2014); As coach: NC Dinos (2015–present)

Career highlights and awards
- Korean Series champion (2009); KBO batting champion (2007)

Lee Hyun-Gon (Korean: 이현곤; Hanja: 李賢坤; born February 21, 1980, in Gwangju, South Korea) is a South Korean former professional baseball infielder and current coach for the NC Dinos of the KBO League. He bats and throws right-handed.

== Amateur career ==
Lee attended Gwangju Jaeil High School in Gwangju, South Korea. In 1997, he was selected for the South Korea national junior team that finished 5th in the 1997 World Junior Baseball Championship in Canada. Lee led the attack alongside Bong Jung-Keun (the eventual MVP of this event), Choi Hee-Seop and Lee Jin-Young, by hitting .480 with 3 home runs.

Upon graduation from high school, Lee was selected by the Haitai Tigers in the first round of the 1998 KBO Draft. However, he entered Yonsei University instead of turning pro directly. In 1998, he was selected for the South Korea national junior team once again and participated in the 1998 Asian Junior Baseball Championship.

As a sophomore at Yonsei University, Lee made his first appearance with the South Korea national baseball team in November 1999, at the 1999 Intercontinental Cup held in Sydney, Australia.

As a junior in 2000, Lee helped Yonsei University win the National Amateur Baseball Championship, earning MVP honors with the RBI title, and was named to the South Korea national team's final 5-man reserve roster for the 2000 Summer Olympics.

As a senior in 2001, Lee was selected for the South Korean national team, and competed in the 2001 Asian Baseball Championship in Taiwan. The team eventually earned the silver medal, and Lee won home run and batting average titles including All-Star selection. In November, Lee was called up to the South Korean national team as an amateur player again, and competed in the 2001 Baseball World Cup. In the tournament, he hit .292 as a utility infielder, playing at second base, third base and shortstop.

=== Notable international careers ===
Year	Venue	Competition	Team	Individual note
1997	Canada	World Junior Baseball Championship	5th	.480 BA (12-for-25), 3 HR, 10 RBI
1998	Chinese Taipei	Asian Junior Baseball Championship	Bronze medal	
1999	Australia	Intercontinental Cup	7th	
2001	Chinese Taipei	Asian Baseball Championship	Silver medal	All-Star (SS), BA & HR title
2001	Chinese Taipei	Baseball World Cup	6th	.292 BA (7-for-24)

== Professional career ==
=== Kia Tigers ===
Signed by the Kia Tigers on January 15, 2002, Lee made his KBO pro league debut on May 2, 2002.

In the 2003 season, Lee became the regular starter at third base for the Tigers, batting a respectable .263 with 92 hits, 5 home runs and 43 RBI in 129 games.

Lee made his first major impact in Game 2 of the 2006 Semi-playoff when he hit a grand slam in the 6th inning, off of Triple Crown winner Ryu Hyun-Jin which gave the Kia Tigers a 6–1 victory over the Hanwha Eagles.

Lee's 2007 season was the best of his career, thus far. He played in all 137 regular-season games, and posted career highs in batting average (.338), hits (153), runs (63), doubles (31), RBI (48) and walks (43). Lee won his first batting title, and led the KBO league in hits. In November, Lee was selected again for the South Korea national team, and competed in the 2007 Asian Baseball Championship in Taiwan. However, he had only three at-bats through the tournament, mainly appearing as a pinch runner in the games.

Lee faded the following year. His batting average dipped to just .257, batting at the bottom of the order in the 2008 season. Although Lee hit 40 RBIs and again had 100-plus hits (102), he was considered one of the most disappointing offensive players in the 2008 KBO season.

In 2009, Lee played in 120 games as a starting shortstop for the Tigers. However, he struggled at the plate, batting 9th in the order during the whole season, and failed to have three consecutive seasons of 100-plus hits. Lee stole a career-high 11 bases, but finished the season with the second-lowest career batting average of .253, 2 home runs, 33 RBIs and 92 hits. In the 2009 Korean Series, however, Lee showed his great offensive performance, batting .316 in seven games and smacking a solo home in Game 4, and received a Korean Series champion ring. On November 14, 2009, Lee belted a pinch-hit RBI double in the ninth off Wirfin Obispo against the Yomiuri Giants at the 2009 KBO-NPB Club Championship.

Lee played a couple of mediocre seasons as a utility infielder with the Tigers before being released into free agency after the 2012 season.

=== NC Dinos ===
Lee was signed by the NC Dinos as a free agent before the 2013 season to a three-year deal. In Dinos franchise debut at home on April 2, 2013, Lee stole the first base in Dinos history in a 4–0 loss to the Lotte Giants. He also hit the franchise's first double off Giants starter Ko Won-Jun and scored its first run in the April 3 contest. In the beginning of the 2013 season, Lee was given a chance to be a starting shortstop. However, he struggled on the plate, hitting .225 with only one RBI through April. In early May, Dinos manager Kim Kyung-Moon installed rookie shortstop No Jin-Hyuk as the starter instead and Lee was benched.

=== Notable international careers ===
Year	Venue	Competition	Team	Individual note
2007	Chinese Taipei	Asian Baseball Championship	Silver medal	.333 BA (1-for-3), 2 R, 1 BB
