= Hur Kyoung-min =

South Korean baseball player

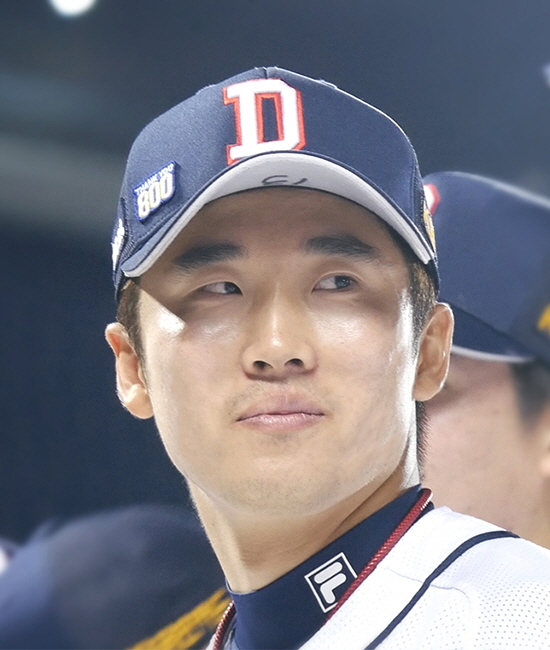

KT Wiz – No. 13
- Third baseman
- Born: August 26, 1990 (age 35)
- Bats: Right Throws: Right

KBO debut
- April 8, 2012, for the Doosan Bears

KBO statistics (through 2024 season)
- Batting average: .293
- Home runs: 60
- Runs batted in: 636
- Stats at Baseball Reference

Teams
- Doosan Bears (2012-2024); KT Wiz (2025-Present)
Medals
Men's baseball
Representing South Korea
2015 WBSC Premier12
Gold medal – first place	2015 Tokyo	Team

Hur Kyoung-min (Korean: 허경민; born August 26, 1990) is a South Korean third baseman who plays for the KT Wiz in the KBO League. He bats and throws right-handed.

== Amateur career ==
While attending Gwangju Jaeil High School, Hur was considered one of the Big 4 shortstops in the Korean high school baseball league along with future KBO stars An Chi-Hong, Kim Sang-Su and Oh Ji-Hwan.

In 2008, Hur was selected for the South Korea national junior baseball team again to compete at the World Junior Baseball Championship, where they claimed their fifth tournament title. In the tourney, he batted .200 (6-for-30) with 2 RBIs and 5 runs, playing in all 8 games as a starting shortstop.

=== Notable international careers ===
Year	Venue	Competition	Team	Individual note
2008	Canada	World Junior Baseball Championship	Gold medal	.200 BA (6-for-30), 2 RBI, 5 R

== Professional career ==
Hur was selected by the Doosan Bears with the 15th overall pick of the 2009 KBO Draft. However, Hur spent his entire 2009 season in the Bears' second-tier team.

After the 2009 season, Hur temporarily left the Bears to serve a two-year mandatory military commitment. He played for the Korean Police Baseball Team in 2010–2011 during his military duty. He returned to the Bears in 2012 and has been with the team ever since.

=== Notable international careers ===
Year	Venue	Competition	Team	Individual note
2009	Europe	Baseball World Cup	9th	.000 BA (0-for-9), 2 R
2010	Chinese Taipei	Intercontinental Cup	6th	.267 BA (4-for-15), 2 RBI, 3 R
2011	Panama	Baseball World Cup	6th	.256 BA (10-for-39), 2 RBI, 3 R
