= Jae-young =

- Hangul: 재영
- RR: Jaeyeong
- MR: Chaeyŏng

Jae-young, also spelled Jae-yeong, is a Korean given name.

People with this name include:

== Entertainers ==
- Jung Jae-young (born Jung Ji-hyun, 1970), South Korean actor
- J (South Korean singer) (born Chung Jae-young, 1977), Korean-American singer
- Park Hee-von (born Park Jae-young, 1983), South Korean actress

== Sportspeople ==
- Yoon Jae-young (born 1983), South Korean table tennis player
- Oh Ju-won (born Oh Jae-young, 1985), South Korean relief pitcher
- Shin Jae-young (born 1989), South Korean baseball pitcher
- Lee Jae-yeong (born 1996), South Korean volleyball player

== Other ==
- Kim Jae-young (author) (born 1966), South Korean writer and professor

== See also ==
- List of Korean given names
