= Han Ki-joo =

South Korean baseball player

Han Ki-Joo
- Relief pitcher
- Born: April 29, 1987 (age 39)
- Batted: Right Threw: Right

KBO debut
- April 9, 2006, for the Kia Tigers

Last KBO appearance
- July 12, 2018, for the Samsung Lions

KBO statistics
- Win–loss record: 26–32
- Saves: 71
- Earned run average: 3.89
- Strikeouts: 314
- Stats at Baseball Reference

Teams
- Kia Tigers (2006–2009, 2011–2012, 2015–2016); Samsung Lions (2018)

Career highlights and awards
- Korean Series champion (2009)
Medals
Representing South Korea
Men's baseball
Olympic Games
Gold medal – first place	2008 Beijing	Team
World Junior Baseball Championship
Bronze medal – third place	2004 Taipei	Team

Han Ki-Joo (Korean: 한기주; Hanja: 韓基周; born April 29, 1987) is a South Korean former right-handed relief pitcher who played in the KBO League for the Samsung Lions.

== Amateur career ==
Han attended Dongsung High School in Gwangju, South Korea. In 2004, he was selected for the South Korea national junior team that won the bronze medal at the 2004 World Junior Baseball Championship in Taiwan. Han, the youngest player on the South Korean team roster, pitched 7 shutout innings, struck out 12, and allowed only 3 hits to win over Australia in the round-robin.

In 2005, he was selected for the national junior team again, along with Kim Kwang-Hyun and Ryu Hyun-Jin, and participated in the 6th Asian Junior Baseball Championship held in Seoul, South Korea. However, his performance was very disappointing, pitching to a 6.28 ERA in 3 games (1 start).

=== Notable international careers ===
Year	Venue	Competition	Team	Individual note
2004	Chinese Taipei	World Junior Baseball Championship	Bronze medal	1.59 ERA, SO title
2005	South Korea	Asian Junior Baseball Championship	Silver medal	6.28 ERA

== Professional career ==
Han debuted with the 2006 Kia Tigers and finished with a record of 11-10, a 3.26 ERA and 78 strikeouts in 44 games. As a rookie starter, he had a fine season, but his stats were dwarfed by those of Ryu Hyun-Jin who became the only player in KBO history to earn both the Rookie of The Year and MVP awards in the same season.

After the season, Han made a transition to the bullpen, filling a void as Kia's closer down the stretch.

Han had his best KBO season as a closer in 2008 when he was ranked third in the league with 26 saves, posting a 1.71 ERA. He was regarded as an unreliable closer, however, as he didn't overwhelm hitters. During the 2008 Beijing Olympics Baseball tournament in August 2008, Han earned the notoriety of being a "choker", "suspense writer", and subject to many other unflattering nicknames due to his failure to close out games in the late innings. Usually a solid closer for his Pro team, Han blew the lead in the 9th inning of the game against the United States, then proceeded to make things interesting once again against Japan a few days later before being yanked with runners on 2nd and 3rd. Han was given yet another chance against Chinese Taipei, which he also subsequently failed to close. However, Korea won all of the aforementioned games en route to winning the gold medal with a perfect record, although Han was not given the chance to pitch again in the tournament after the game against Chinese Taipei.

In May 2009, after blowing four saves within one month with a 6.08 ERA, Han was demoted from his role as Tigers closer, losing the job to Yoon Suk-Min. After finishing the 2009 season with a record of 4-5 and an ERA of 4.24 as a setup man, he required Tommy John surgery and subsequently missed most of the 2010 season.

He suffered injury in 2011, 2012. He just played 28 innings for 2 years. In 2013, he surgery shoulder and rehabilitation 2 years.

=== International career ===
Year	Venue	Competition	Team	Individual note
2007	Chinese Taipei	Asian Baseball Championship	Silver medal	
2008	Chinese Taipei	Final Olympic Qualification Tournament	Silver medal	
2008	China	Olympic Games	Gold medal	1-0; 19.29 ERA (3 G, 2.1 IP, 5 ER)

== Filmography ==
=== Television show ===
Year	Title	Role	Ref.
2022	Youth Baseball Team	Pitching coach	
