= 2023 U-18 Baseball World Cup =

Tournament details
- Country: Taiwan
- Dates: August 31 - September 10
- Teams: 12
- Defending champions: United States

Final positions
- Champions: Japan (1st title)
- Runners-up: Chinese Taipei
- Third place: South Korea
- Fourth place: United States

Tournament statistics
- Games played: 50
- Best BA: (Japan) Ren Ogata (.571)
- Most HRs: (Chinese Taipei) Chao-Hung Chang (2)
- Most SBs: (United States) Derek Curiel (6)
- Best ERA: (Panama) Kelvin Contreras (0.47)
- Most Ks (as pitcher): (South Korea) Kim Taek-yeon (20)

Awards
- MVP: (Japan) Ren Ogata

The 2023 U-18 Baseball World Cup or the XXXI U-18 Baseball World Cup was an international baseball tournament held by the World Baseball Softball Confederation for players 18-year-old and younger. The 2023 edition was held in Taipei and Taichung, Taiwan from August 31 to September 10, 2023.

== Format ==
First round: The twelve participating nations were drawn into two groups of 6, in which single round robin will occur. The top 3 nations from each group advances to the Super Round, while the bottom 3 nations from each group advance to the consolation round.

Consolation round: The 6 nations in this round play one game against the teams they have not played yet. (example: The 4th placed team from Group A will play the bottom three teams from Group B)

Super round: The format in the super round is similar to that of the consolation round. Each team plays the top three teams from the opposing group. (example: The 1st placed team from Group B will play the top three teams from Group A) The standings for this round will include the 2 games played against the 2 other second-round qualifiers from the team's first-round group, and the 3 games played in the second round, for a total of 5 games. The 3rd and 4th-place finishers advance to the bronze-medal game, and the 1st and 2nd-place finishers advance to the gold-medal game.

Finals: The Finals consist of the Bronze Medal Game, contested by the 3rd and 4th-place finishers, and the gold-medal game, contested by the 1st and 2nd-place finishers.

== Teams ==
The following 12 teams qualified for the tournament.

Pool A	Pool B
Australia	Spain
Czech Republic	Japan
South Korea	Netherlands
Mexico	Panama
Puerto Rico	United States
Chinese Taipei^{1}	Venezuela

^{1}Republic of China, commonly known as Taiwan, due to complicated relations with People's Republic of China, is recognized by the name Chinese Taipei by most of the international organizations in sports competitions. For more information, please see Cross-Strait relations.

== First round ==
=== Group A ===
Pos	Team	Pld	W	L	RF	RA	PCT	GB	Qualification
1	Chinese Taipei (H)	5	5	0	33	5	1.000	—	Advance to super round
2	South Korea	5	4	1	28	9	.800	1	Advance to super round
3	Puerto Rico	5	3	2	16	26	.600	2	Advance to super round
4	Mexico	5	1	4	8	12	.200 (Note: Three-way tie decided by TQB)	4	Advance to placement round
5	Czech Republic	5	1	4	10	30	.200	4	Advance to placement round
6	Australia	5	1	4	6	19	.200	4	Advance to placement round

Source: WBSC
(H) Hosts
Notes:

Date	Local time	Road team	Score	Home team	Inn.	Venue	Game duration	Attendance	Boxscore
Aug 31, 2023	18:30	Australia	0–3	Chinese Taipei		Taipei Tianmu Baseball Stadium	1:45	2524	Boxscore
Sep 2, 2023	10:30	Mexico	2-4	Australia		Taichung Intercontinental Baseball Stadium	1:48	145	Boxscore
Sep 2, 2023	14:30	Czech Republic	2-6	Puerto Rico		Taichung Intercontinental Baseball Stadium	2:11	300	Boxscore
Sep 2, 2023	19:30	South Korea	1-6	Chinese Taipei		Taichung Intercontinental Baseball Stadium	2:33	3000	Boxscore
Sep 3, 2023	09:00	Australia	0-6	Puerto Rico		Taichung Intercontinental Baseball Stadium	1:59	150	Boxscore
Sep 3, 2023	12:00	Chinese Taipei	4-1	Mexico		Taichung Intercontinental Baseball Stadium	2:41	750	Boxscore
Sep 3, 2023	17:00	South Korea	14-1	Czech Republic		Taichung Intercontinental Baseball Stadium	2:51	120	Boxscore
Sep 4, 2023	13:30	Puerto Rico	1-0	Mexico		Taichung Intercontinental Baseball Stadium	1:57		Boxscore
Sep 4, 2023	16:30	Australia	0-3	South Korea		Taichung Intercontinental Baseball Stadium	2:21		Boxscore
Sep 4, 2023	19:30	Chinese Taipei	4–1	Czech Republic		Taichung Intercontinental Baseball Stadium	2:01		Boxscore
Sep 5, 2023	09:00	Mexico	1-2	South Korea		Taichung Intercontinental Baseball Stadium	1:59	75	Boxscore
Sep 5, 2023	12:00	Czech Republic	5-2	Australia		Taichung Intercontinental Baseball Stadium	2:16	100	Boxscore
Sep 6, 2023	09:00	Puerto Rico	2-16	Chinese Taipei	F/5	Taichung Intercontinental Baseball Stadium	1:54	200	Boxscore
Sep 7, 2023	09:00	Puerto Rico	1-8	South Korea		Taichung Stadium	2:19	120	Boxscore
Sep 8, 2023	09:00	Czech Republic	1-4	Mexico		Taichung Stadium	1:39	20	Boxscore

=== Group B ===
Pos	Team	Pld	W	L	RF	RA	PCT	GB	Qualification
1	United States	5	4	1	22	12	.800 (Note: Three-way tie decided by TQB)	—	Advance to super round
2	Japan	5	4	1	31	4	.800	—	Advance to super round
3	Netherlands	5	4	1	19	7	.800	—	Advance to super round
4	Panama	5	2	3	23	22	.400	2	Advance to placement round
5	Venezuela	5	1	4	13	36	.200	3	Advance to placement round
6	Spain	5	0	5	4	31	.000	4	Advance to placement round

Source: WBSC
Notes:

Date	Local time	Road team	Score	Home team	Inn.	Venue	Game duration	Attendance	Boxscore
Sep 1, 2023	10:30	Netherlands	1-2	United States		Taipei Tianmu Baseball Stadium	2:10	170	Boxscore
Sep 1, 2023	14:30	Panama	13-4	Venezuela		Taipei Tianmu Baseball Stadium	2:47	110	Boxscore
Sep 1, 2023	18:30	Spain	0-10	Japan	F/6	Taipei Tianmu Baseball Stadium	1:41	450	Boxscore
Sep 2, 2023	10:30	Venezuela	2-8	Netherlands		Taipei Tianmu Baseball Stadium	2:31	80	Boxscore
Sep 2, 2023	14:30	United States	7–2	Spain		Taipei Tianmu Baseball Stadium	2:02	180	Boxscore
Sep 2, 2023	18:30	Panama	0–7	Japan		Taipei Tianmu Baseball Stadium	2:07	888	Boxscore
Sep 3, 2023	09:00	Spain	1-6	Venezuela		Taipei Tianmu Baseball Stadium	2:08	44	Boxscore
Sep 3, 2023	13:35	Netherlands	4-3	Panama		Taipei Tianmu Baseball Stadium	2:10	573	Boxscore
Sep 3, 2023	16:30	Japan	4-3	United States		Taipei Tianmu Baseball Stadium	2:24	1352	Boxscore
Sep 4, 2023	14:00	Spain	0–5	Netherlands		Taipei Tianmu Baseball Stadium	1:40	500	Boxscore
Sep 4, 2023	17:00	United States	6-4	Panama		Taipei Tianmu Baseball Stadium	2:21	369	Boxscore
Sep 4, 2023	20:00	Japan	10-0	Venezuela		Taipei Tianmu Baseball Stadium	2:15	484	Boxscore
Sep 5, 2023	10:30	Panama	3-1	Spain		Taipei Tianmu Baseball Stadium	1:45	230	Boxscore
Sep 5, 2023	14:30	Venezuela	1-4	United States		Taipei Tianmu Baseball Stadium	1:43	250	Boxscore
Sep 5, 2023	18:30	Netherlands	1-0	Japan		Taipei Tianmu Baseball Stadium	1:31	593	Boxscore

== Super round ==
Pos	Team	Pld	W	L	RF	RA	PCT	GB	Qualification
1	Chinese Taipei (H)	5	5	0	36	5	1.000	—	Advance to final
2	Japan	5	3	2	23	10	.600	2	Advance to final
3	United States	5	2	3	13	13	.400 (Note: Three-way tie decided by TQB)	3	Advance to third-place game
4	South Korea	5	2	3	14	20	.400	3	Advance to third-place game
5	Puerto Rico	5	2	3	10	39	.400	3	
6	Netherlands	5	1	4	5	14	.200	4	

Source: WBSC
(H) Hosts
Notes:

Date	Local time	Road team	Score	Home team	Inn.	Venue	Game duration	Attendance	Boxscore
Sep 7, 2023	11:30	Puerto Rico	3-2	Netherlands		Taipei Tianmu Baseball Stadium	2:23	160	Boxscore
Sep 7, 2023	14:30	South Korea	1-7	Japan		Taipei Tianmu Baseball Stadium	1:46	514	Boxscore
Sep 7, 2023	18:30	Chinese Taipei	3-0	United States		Taipei Tianmu Baseball Stadium	2:08	647	Boxscore
Sep 8, 2023	10:30	Puerto Rico	0-10	Japan	F/5	Taipei Tianmu Baseball Stadium	1:39	186	Boxscore
Sep 8, 2023	14:30	South Korea	1-5	United States		Taipei Tianmu Baseball Stadium	1:51	287	Boxscore
Sep 8, 2023	18:30	Netherlands	0-6	Chinese Taipei		Taipei Tianmu Baseball Stadium	1:57	390	Boxscore
Sep 9, 2023	10:00	Puerto Rico	4–3	United States		Taipei Tianmu Baseball Stadium	2:20	230	Boxscore
Sep 9, 2023	14:30	Netherlands	1-3	South Korea		Taipei Tianmu Baseball Stadium	2:15	317	Boxscore
Sep 9, 2023	18:00	Japan	2-5	Chinese Taipei		Taipei Tianmu Baseball Stadium	1:55	7014	Boxscore

== Placement round ==
Pos	Team	Pld	W	L	RF	RA	PCT	GB
1	Panama	5	4	1	24	15	.800	—
2	Mexico	5	3	2	22	17	.600 (Note: Three-way tie decided by TQB)	1
3	Czech Republic	5	3	2	18	10	.600	1
4	Australia	5	3	2	17	10	.600	1
5	Venezuela	5	2	3	16	31	.400	2
6	Spain	5	0	5	7	21	.000	4

Source: WBSC
Notes:

Date	Local time	Road team	Score	Home team	Inn.	Venue	Game duration	Attendance	Boxscore
Sep 7, 2023	09:30	Spain	0-4	Czech Republic		Taichung Stadium	1:56	50	Boxscore
Sep 7, 2023	12:30	Venezuela	5-2	Mexico		Taichung Stadium	2:17	30	Boxscore
Sep 7, 2023	15:30	Panama	2-1	Australia	F/8	Taichung Stadium	2:07	75	Boxscore
Sep 8, 2023	12:00	Spain	5-6	Mexico		Taichung Stadium	1:54	100	Boxscore
Sep 8, 2023	15:00	Czech Republic	1–4	Panama		Taichung Stadium	1:45	50	Boxscore
Sep 9, 2023	09:00	Mexico	8-2	Panama		Taichung Stadium	2:00		Boxscore
Sep 9, 2023	11:30	Spain	0-2	Australia		Taichung Stadium	1:42	75	Boxscore
Sep 10, 2023	09:00	Venezuela	1-8	Australia		Taichung Stadium	1:53	53	Boxscore
Sep 10, 2023	11:00	Czech Republic	7-0	Venezuela		Taichung Stadium	2:21	30	Boxscore

== Finals ==
=== Third-place game ===
Date	Local time	Road team	Score	Home team	Inn.	Venue	Game duration	Attendance	Boxscore
Sep 10, 2023	14:00	South Korea	4-0	United States		Taipei Tianmu Baseball Stadium	2:03	460	Boxscore

=== Championship ===
Date	Local time	Road team	Score	Home team	Inn.	Venue	Game duration	Attendance	Boxscore
Sep 10, 2023	18:00	Japan	2–1	Chinese Taipei		Taipei Tianmu Baseball Stadium	2:17	9,502	Boxscore

== Final standings ==
Rk	Team	W	L
1st place, gold medalist(s)	Japan	7	2
Lost in final
2nd place, silver medalist(s)	Chinese Taipei	8	1
Failed to qualify for the final
3rd place, bronze medalist(s)	South Korea	6	3
Lost in 3rd place game
4	United States	5	4
Failed to qualify for the finals
5	Puerto Rico	5	3
6	Netherlands	4	4
Failed to qualify for the super round
7	Panama	4	4
8	Mexico	3	5
9	Czech Republic	3	5
10	Australia	3	5
11	Venezuela	2	6
12	Spain	0	8

== U-18 All-World Team ==
Position	Player
C	(Chinese Taipei) Meng-Chih Hu
1B	(United States) P. J. Morlando
2B	(Japan) Ren Ogata
3B	(Panama) Dimas Oda
SS	(United States) Manuelle Marin
OF	(Mexico) Antonio Macias
OF	(Chinese Taipei) Ching-Hsien Ko
OF	(Netherlands) Miquel Willem
DH	(South Korea) Sangjun Lee
P	(Japan) Aoi Higashionna
P	(South Korea) Kim Taek-yeon

== Statistical leaders ==
=== Batting ===
Statistic	Name	Total/Avg
Batting average*	(Japan) Ren Ogata	.571
Hits	(Japan) Ren Ogata	12
Runs	(Japan) Ren Ogata	10
Doubles	(Chinese Taipei) Ting-Lung Hsu	3
Doubles	(Czech Republic) Filip Kubíček	3
Triples	(United States) James Coy	2
Triples	(Puerto Rico) Adonys Velez	2
Home runs	(Chinese Taipei) Chao-Hung Chang	2
Runs batted in	(Chinese Taipei) Chao-Hung Chang	9
Walks	5 tied with	7
Stolen bases	(United States) Derek Curiel	6
On-base percentage*	(Chinese Taipei) Ching-Hsien Ko	1.150
Slugging percentage*	(Chinese Taipei) Ching-Hsien Ko	.704
OPS*	(Chinese Taipei) Ching-Hsien Ko	1.854

* Minimum 2.1 plate appearances per team game

=== Pitching ===
Statistic	Name	Total/Avg
Wins	(Chinese Taipei) Wei-Che Tseng	3
Saves	(United States) Trey Gregory-Alford	3
Innings pitched	(Australia) Jack Bushell	15
Innings pitched	(Panama) Kelvin Contreras	15
Earned run average*	(Panama) Kelvin Contreras	0.47
Strikeouts	(South Korea) Taek-yeon Kim	20
Walks allowed*	(Australia) Jack Bushell	3
Walks allowed*	(South Korea) Jun-seo Hwang	3
BAA*	(Netherlands) Maxwell Cornelissen	.146

* Minimum 1.5 innings pitched per team game
