= Oh Ji-hwan =

South Korean baseball player (born 1990)

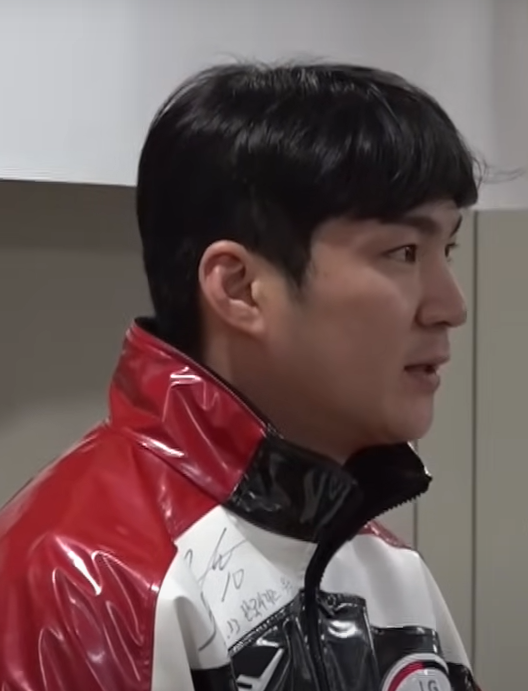

LG Twins – No. 10
- Shortstop
- Born: July 2, 1990 (age 35); South Korea
- Bats: Left Throws: Right

KBO debut
- September 12, 2009, for the LG Twins

KBO statistics (through 2025)
- Batting average: .264
- Home runs: 180
- Runs batted in: 928
- Stats at Baseball Reference

Teams
- LG Twins (2009–present)

Career highlights and awards
- KBO All-Star selection (2010); 2× KBO Golden Glove Award (2022–2023)
Medals
Men's baseball
Representing South Korea
World Junior Baseball Championship
Gold medal – first place	2008 Edmonton	Team

- Oh Ji-hwan
- Hangul: 오지환
- Hanja: 吳志煥
- RR: O Jihwan
- MR: O Chihwan

Oh Ji-hwan (Korean: 오지환; Hanja: 吳志煥; born March 12, 1990, in Gunsan, Jeollabuk-do) is a South Korean shortstop who plays for the LG Twins in the KBO League. He bats left-handed and throws right-handed.

== Amateur career ==
While attending Kyunggi High School in Seoul, Oh was considered one of the top shortstop prospects in the Korean high school baseball league along with An Chi-hong. Oh was also a power pitcher who occupied the No. 1 spot in the starting rotation of his team.

In 2008, he was selected for the South Korea national junior baseball team to compete at the World Junior Baseball Championship, where they claimed their fifth tournament title. Oh played in all eight games for the team as an infielder, designated hitter and relief pitcher, and was named to the All-Star tournament team as a designated hitter.

== Professional career ==
Oh was drafted by the LG Twins in the first round of the 2009 KBO Draft and made his pro debut on September 12, 2009. He had one at-bat as a pinch hitter in that game, striking out swinging to SK Wyverns pitcher Gary Glover in the top of the seventh inning. He appeared in only five games with the Twins in 2009, getting one hit and striking out five times in nine at-bats.

On March 27, 2010, Oh hit his first professional league home run off Yoon Sung-hwan in the 2010 KBO Opening Day game, going 2-for-4 and driving in three runs in a 7–5 win over the Samsung Lions. During the 2010 season, Oh was impressive enough to earn the starting shortstop job for the Twins over another candidates. He led the league in strikeouts with 137 but drove in 61 runs, the most in team history by a shortstop for a single season, and hit 13 home runs, the most among the starting shortstops in the league.

== International career ==
After the 2010 season, Oh was selected for the South Korea national baseball team to compete in the Intercontinental Cup held in Taichung.

In 2018, he represented South Korea at the 2018 Asian Games.

Year	Venue	Competition	Team	Individual note
2008	Canada	World Junior Baseball Championship	Gold medal	.393 BA (11-for-28), 9 RBI, 8 R, 5 SB, 5 BB; 1-0; 6.75 ERA (1 G, 2.2 IP, 2 ER, 2 K); All-Star (DH)
2010	Taiwan	Intercontinental Cup	6th	.250 (6-for-24), 1 HR, 4 RBI, 4 R
