= Jin-hyuk =

- Hangul: 진혁
- RR: Jinhyeok
- MR: Chinhyŏk

Jin-hyuk, also spelled Jin-hyeok or Jin-hyok, is a Korean given name.

People with this name include:

- Oh Jin-hyek (born 1981), South Korean archer
- Choi Jin-hyuk (born Kim Tae-ho, 1986), South Korean actor
- Kim Jin-hyeok (born 1989), South Korean Greco-Roman wrestler
- No Jin-hyuk (born 1989), South Korean baseball player
- Jeong Jin-hyeok (born 1991), South Korean long distance runner
- Lee Jin-hyuk (born 1996), South Korean singer and actor

== See also ==
- List of Korean given names
