= Lee Dae-hyung =

South Korean baseball player

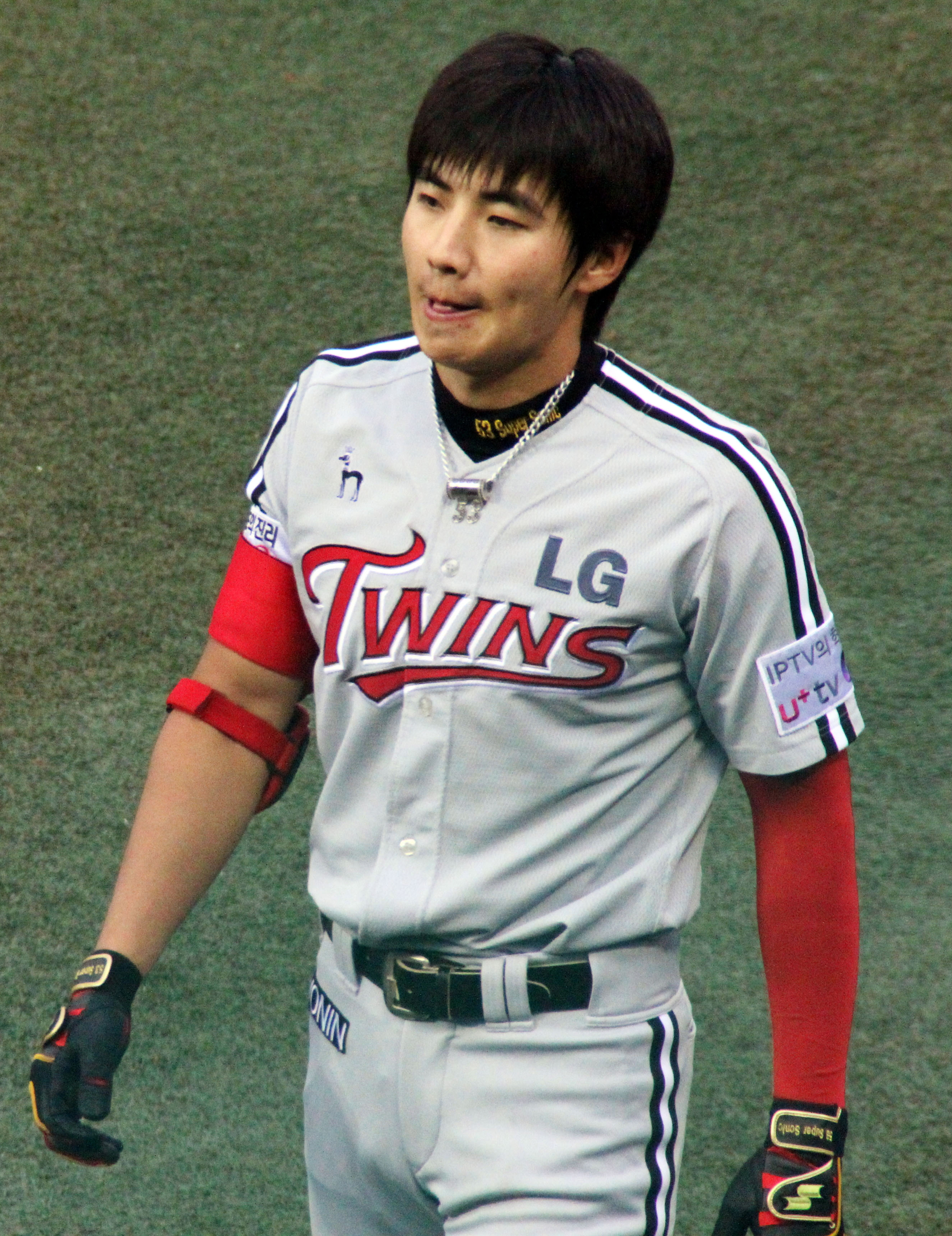
- Outfielder
- Born: July 19, 1983 (age 41)
- Batted: Left Threw: Left

KBO debut
- April 5, 2003, for the LG Twins

Last appearance
- July 31, 2019, for the KT Wiz

KBO statistics
- Batting average: .278
- Home Runs: 9
- RBI: 361
- Stolen bases: 505

Teams
- LG Twins (2003–2013); Kia Tigers (2014); KT Wiz (2015–2019)

Career highlights and awards
- KBO 3rd all-time in stolen bases; 1x Golden Glove Award (2007); 4-time stolen-base leader (2007–2010)

- Lee Dae-hyung
- Hangul: 이대형
- Hanja: 李大炯
- RR: I Daehyeong
- MR: I Taehyŏng

Lee Dae-hyung (Korean: 이대형; Hanja: 李大炯), born July 19, 1983, in Boryeong, is a retired South Korean outfielder for the KBO League. Lee played 17 seasons in the KBO — eleven seasons for the LG Twins, one year for the Kia Tigers, and his final five seasons with the KT Wiz. He is third all-time in the KBO in career stolen bases. He batted and threw left-handed.

From 2007 to 2010, Lee stole at least 50 bases each season, three times topping 60 stolen bases. He led the KBO in stolen bases all four years.

On August 6, 2017, Lee ruptured the cruciate ligament in his left knee while stealing second base in a game against the SK Wyverns, causing him to miss the rest of the season. He never returned to form in the following two seasons, and declared his retirement at the age of 35 on April 10, 2020.

After Lee retired from playing baseball, Lee has appeared in many entertainment programs.

== Filmography ==
=== Television show ===
Year	Title	Role	Notes	Ref.
2021	Leader's Romance	Cast Member		
2022	legendfestival	Participant	Special festival	
2022	Back to the Ground	Participant		

=== Web shows ===
Year	Title	Role	Notes	Ref.
2022	Moon Sen Man	Host	with Chae Tae-in	

== See also ==
- List of KBO career stolen bases leaders
