= Derek Curiel =

American baseball player (born 2005)

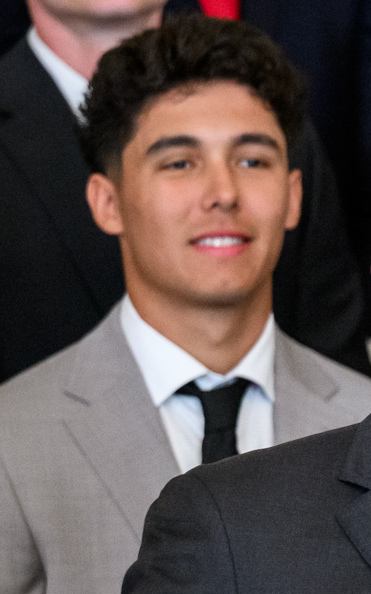
- Curiel at the White House in 2025

Pittsburgh Pirates
- Outfielder
- Born: May 24, 2005 (age 21); Baldwin Park, California, U.S.
- Bats: Left Throws: Left
- Stats at Baseball Reference

Derek Boaz Curiel (born May 24, 2005) is an American professional baseball outfielder in the Pittsburgh Pirates organization.

== Amateur career ==
Curiel grew up in West Covina, California and attended Orange Lutheran High School. He committed to play college baseball at Louisiana State University (LSU) as a sophomore and was rated the top collegiate prospect in the nation by Perfect Game. Curiel batted .358 with eight doubles and 15 stolen bases during his junior season. He played for the United States national baseball team in the 2023 U-18 Baseball World Cup and hit .240 over nine games. Curiel batted .314 as a senior. While initially considered one of the better high school prospects for the 2024 MLB Draft, Curiel's stock fell during his senior year. He ultimately decided to withdraw from the draft and enroll at LSU.

Curiel entered his freshman season with the LSU Tigers in 2025 as their starting left fielder. He played in 68 games and batted .345 with seven home runs and 55 RBI, helping lead the Tigers to a win in the 2025 Men's College World Series.

Curiel entered his sophomore season in 2026 as a top prospect for the upcoming MLB draft. He appeared in 58 games and hit .353 with six home runs, 46 RBI, and 13 stolen bases.

== Professional career ==
Curiel was drafted by the Pittsburgh Pirates with the fifth overall pick in the 2026 Major League Baseball draft. He signed with the Pirates for a $6.2 million signing bonus.
