= 2008 World Junior Baseball Championship =

Tournament details
- Country: Canada
- Dates: 25 July – 3 August
- Teams: 12
- Defending champions: South Korea

Final positions
- Champions: South Korea (5th title)
- Runners-up: United States
- Third place: Cuba
- Fourth place: Australia

Tournament statistics
- Games played: 42

The 2008 World Junior AAA Championship was held in Edmonton, Alberta, Canada, from July 25 to August 3, 2008.

== Group stage ==
=== Pool A ===
- United States 5–0
- South Korea 4–1
- Australia 3–2
- Mexico 2–3
- Netherlands 1–4
- Russia 0–5

=== Pool B ===
- Cuba 4–1
- Canada 4–1
- Chinese Taipei 3–2
- Puerto Rico 3–2
- Italy 1–4
- Czech Republic 0–5

== Knockout stage ==
Quarter-finals
August 1, 2008 – 19:05
Australia	2
Canada	1
August 1, 2008 – 10:00
Puerto Rico	0
United States	7
August 1, 2008 – 10:00
Chinese Taipei	4
South Korea	5
August 1, 2008 – 15:00
Mexico	7
Cuba	8

Semi-finals
August 2, 2008 – 19:00
Australia	1
United States	3
August 2, 2008 – 15:00
South Korea	6
Cuba	1

Final
August 3, 2008 – 16:30
United States	0
South Korea	7
Third place
August 3, 2008 – 13:15
Cuba	6
Australia	2

=== Fifth through eighth place ===
Classification round
August 2, 2008 – 19:00
Canada	9
Puerto Rico	6
August 2, 2008 – 14:00
Chinese Taipei	1
Mexico	0

Fifth place
August 3, 2008 – 10:00
Canada	4
Chinese Taipei	12
Seventh place
August 3, 2008 – 10:00
Puerto Rico	0
Mexico	2

== Final standings ==
Classification
1	South Korea
2	United States
3	Cuba
4	Australia
5	Chinese Taipei
6	Canada
7	Mexico
8	Puerto Rico
9	Netherlands
10	Italy
11	Czech Republic
12	Russia

2008 World Junior Baseball champions

South Korea
5th title

== Awards ==
Awards	Player
Most Valuable Player	(South Korea) Yung-hoon Sung
Outstanding Defensive Player	(South Korea) An Chi-hong

All-Tournament Team
Position	Player
Catcher	(Canada) Brett Lawrie
First Base	(United States) Jeff Malm
Second Base	(Mexico) Adán Velázquez
Third Base	(United States) Harold Martinez
Shortstop	(United States) Nolan Fontana
Outfield	(South Korea) Jung Soo-bin
Outfield	(Cuba) Yasiel Puig
Outfield	(Canada) Michael Crouse
Designated Hitter	(South Korea) Oh Ji-hwan
Left-handed Pitcher	(United States) Matt Purke
Right-handed Pitcher	(Chinese Taipei) Che-Ming Su

== See also ==
- World Junior Baseball Championship
