= Kim Sang-hyun (baseball) =

South Korean baseball player

Kim Sang-hyeon
- Third baseman
- Born: November 12, 1980 (age 45)
- Bats: Right Throws: Right

KBO debut
- 2001, for the Haitai Tigers

KBO statistics (through 2016)
- Batting average: .247
- Home runs: 121
- RBI: 437
- Hits: 723
- Stats at Baseball Reference

Teams
- Haitai Tigers / Kia Tigers (2000–2002); LG Twins (2002–2009); Kia Tigers (2009–2013); SK Wyverns (2013–2014); KT Wiz (2015–2016)

Career highlights and awards
- KBO MVP (2009); Korean Series champion (2009); KBO League Golden Glove Award (2009)
Medals
Men's baseball
Representing South Korea
Baseball World Cup
Silver medal – second place	2005 Netherlands	Team

- Kim Sang-hyun
- Hangul: 김상현
- Hanja: 金相賢
- RR: Gim Sanghyeon
- MR: Kim Sanghyŏn

Kim Sang-hyeon (Korean: 김상현; Hanja: 金相賢; born November 12, 1980, in Gunsan, North Jeolla Province, South Korea) is a South Korean third baseman who played for 16 years in the KBO League.

== Professional career ==
Kim debuted with the 2001 Haitai Tigers, the predecessor of Kia Tigers, but played an active part in farm team. Thus, In 2002 KBO season, he was traded to the LG Twins.

In 2004, Kim was drafted into the Korea Armed Forces Athletic Corps. In the Korea Armed Forces Athletic Corps, Kim was the home run leader. In 2007, Kim was discharged from military service and returned to the LG Twins. However, he still played an active part in the farm team.

In the 2009 KBO season, he was traded back to the Kia Tigers. Kim played in 121 games, hitting .315 with 127 RBI and hit a league-leading and a pro career-best 36 home runs. Kim and Hee-seop Choi hit 69 home runs, and the two together were called the "CK Cannon". In 2009 Korean Series, Kim hit a three-run homer in Game Three. After the season, Kim was given the KBO League Most Valuable Player Award. On December 11, 2009, he obtained his first Golden Glove Award as a third baseman.

In June 2016, Kim was banned from returning as a player for a minimum of a year without KT Wiz's approval, after he was booked without detention for allegedly masturbating in public while looking at a female college student on June 16, 2016. Kim has not played in the KBO since.

=== Achievements ===
- 2009 Home Run Title
- 2009 RBI Title
- 2009 Slugging Percentage Leader

=== Awards and honors ===
- 2009 KBO MVP
- 2009 Golden Glove Award (Third baseman)
