= Kim Taek-yeon =

South Korean baseball player (born 2005)

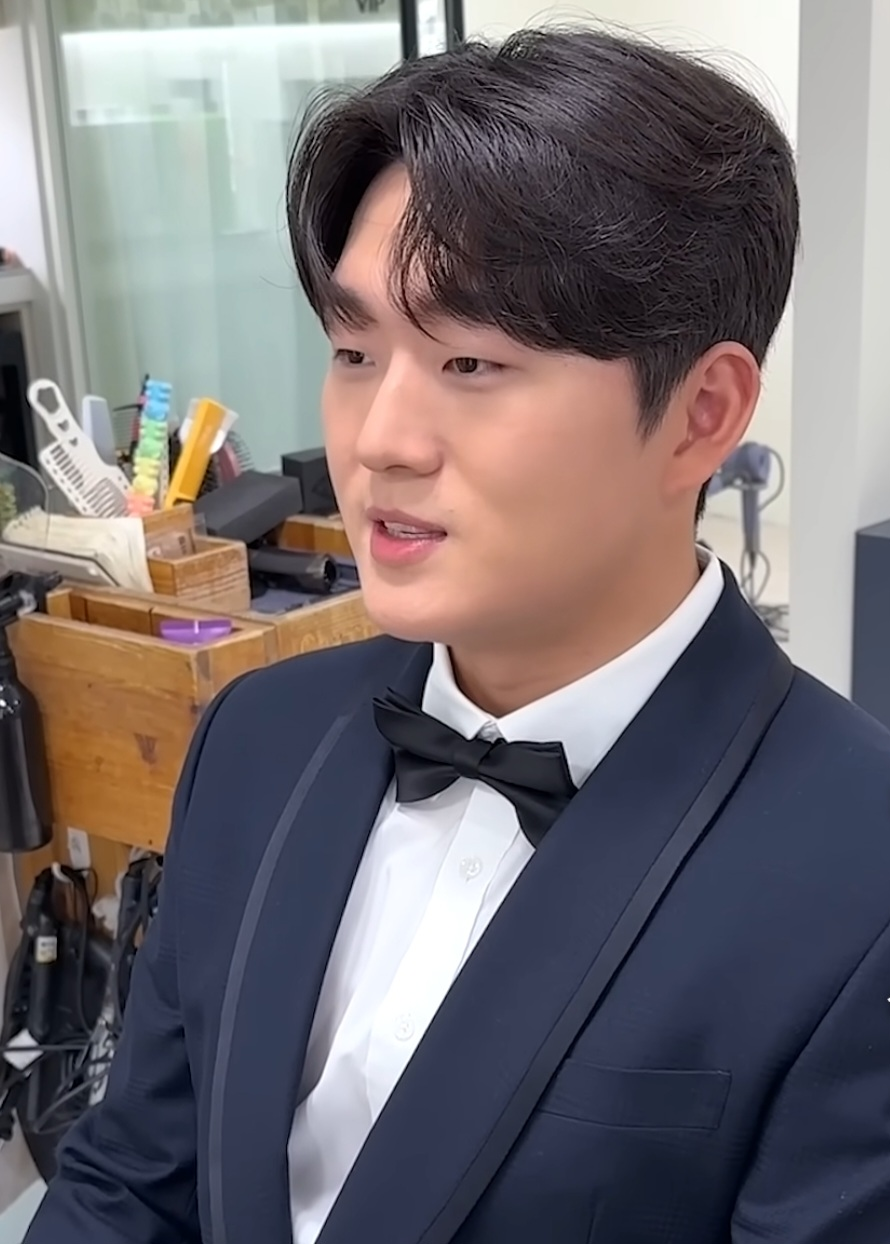

Doosan Bears – No. 63
- Pitcher
- Born: June 3, 2005 (age 21); Incheon, South Korea
- Bats: Right Throws: Right

KBO debut
- May 23, 2024, for the Doosan Bears

KBO statistics (through July 22, 2026)
- Win–loss record: 7–9
- Earned run average: 2.85
- Strikeouts: 188
- Stats at Baseball Reference

Teams
- Doosan Bears (2024–present)

Career highlights and awards
- KBO Rookie of the Year (2024)
Medals
Men's baseball
Representing South Korea
U-18 Baseball World Cup
Bronze medal – third place	2023 Taipei and Taichung	Team

Kim Taek-yeon (Korean: 김택연; born June 3, 2005) is a South Korean professional baseball player for the Doosan Bears of the KBO League. He won the KBO League Rookie of the Year Award in 2024.

== Career ==
He represented the South Korea national baseball team at the 2026 World Baseball Classic.
