= Na Ji-wan =

South Korean baseball player

Na Jiwan
- Outfielder
- Born: May 19, 1985 (age 40); Seoul, South Korea
- Batted: Right Threw: Right

KBO debut
- March 29, 2008, for the Kia Tigers

Last appearance
- October 7, 2022, for the Kia Tigers

KBO statistics
- Batting average: .277
- Home runs: 221
- RBI: 862
- Stats at Baseball Reference

Teams
- Kia Tigers (2008–2022)

Career highlights and awards
- Korean Series champion and MVP in 2009

- Na Ji-wan
- Hangul: 나지완
- Hanja: 羅智莞
- RR: Na Jiwan
- MR: Na Chiwan

Na Jiwan (Korean: 나지완, born May 19, 1985) is a South Korean former professional baseball outfielder. From 2008 to 2022, he played for the Kia Tigers of the KBO League. He batted and threw right-handed.

== Amateur career ==
While attending Shinil Junior High School in Seoul, Na was a power pitcher who could throw 88-mile fastballs. In 2000, he was selected for the South Korean national youth baseball team (under-16). The team won the gold medal at the inaugural Asian Youth Baseball Championship, and Na was named MVP of the competition, appearing in all the games as a pitcher.

In 2001, he entered the Shinil High School baseball team, but converted to a position player due to elbow injuries.

After three years at Shinil High School, Na went undrafted in the 2004 KBO Draft. Instead, he continued his baseball career in Dankook University.

While attending college, Na was considered one of the top sluggers in the South Korean collegiate baseball league, winning home run titles in 2006 and 2007.

In October 2007, as a senior in Dankook University, Na was selected for the South Korea national baseball team to compete in the 2007 Baseball World Cup. He was the only amateur outfielder in the South Korean roster. In the tournament, Na batted .385 with 3 RBI as a starting left fielder.

=== Notable international careers ===
Year	Venue	Competition	Team	Individual note
2007	Chinese Taipei	2007 Baseball World Cup	5th	.385 BA (15-for-39), 3 RBI, 3 R, 1 SB
2014	South Korea	2014 Asian Games	Gold medal	.000 BA (0-for-4), 0 RBI, 0 R, 0 SB

For the 2014 Asian Games, he reportedly hid an injury.

== Professional career ==
Selected by the Kia Tigers with the 5th pick in the 2nd round of the 2008 KBO Draft, Na made his pro debut in the Tigers opening game against the Samsung Lions on March 29, 2008. He was the first rookie player to bat cleanup in the opening game in the Tigers' history. In his first at-bat, Na struck out swinging against Bae Young-Soo. He was 0-for-3 with 1 RBI in his first professional game. Na fell into a slump, showing a weakness against breaking balls, and was demoted to the second (reserve) team of the Tigers at the end of April. In June, he returned to the 26-man first team roster but played as a platoon or backup outfielder. Na finished his rookie season with a batting average of .295, 6 home runs and 30 RBI, playing in 73 games.

In 2009, Na became a fixture at left field for the Tigers as starting outfielder Lee Yong-Kyu was sidelined due to an ankle injury in the beginning of the season. His batting average dipped to .263, but he had 482 plate appearances, which enabled him to qualify for the batting title (ranked 39th in the league), and smacked 23 home runs (11th in the league). Besides, Na was 18th in walks (66), 19th in RBI (73) and 23rd in slugging percentage (.474).

On October 24, 2009, Na hit a game and series-winning solo home run in the bottom of the ninth inning off Chae Byung-Ryong during Game 7 of the 2009 Korean Series. The dramatic homer gave the Kia Tigers a 6–5 victory over the two-time defending champion SK Wyverns. Na's home run was the third walk-off home run in Korean Series history. Earlier in the game, when Kia was trailing 5–1 in the sixth inning, Na smacked a two-run home run off Wyverns' reliever Lee Seung-Ho. Na's big bat in Game 7 helped earn him MVP honors in the Korean Series, although Tigers' starting pitcher Aquilino López arguably deserved the award. Lopez was the winning pitcher in Game 1, a 5–3 Kia victory, then hurled a shutout in a 3–0 Tigers' win in Game 5. The former major-leaguer also got two outs in relief, with an SK runner on second base and the game tied at five, in the eighth inning of Game 7.

In 2016, he qualified as a free agent and remained with a total of 4 billion won, including 1.6 billion won in four-year down payment and 600 million won in annual salary.

=== Awards and honors ===
- 2009 Korean Series MVP
