= Ko Won-jun =

South Korean baseball player (born 1990)

- Pitcher
- Born: June 23, 1990 (age 35)
- Bats: Right Throws: Right

KBO debut
- April 15, 2010, for the Nexen Heroes

KBO statistics (through 2017 season)
- Win–loss record: 19–27
- Earned run average: 4.54
- Strikeouts: 270

Teams
- Nexen Heroes (2009–2010); Lotte Giants (2011–2016); Doosan Bears (2016–2017)

- Ko Won-jun
- Hangul: 고원준
- Hanja: 高源浚
- RR: Go Wonjun
- MR: Ko Wŏnjun

Ko Won-jun (Korean: 고원준; Hanja: 高原準; born January 23, 1990, in Jeju City) is a South Korean baseball pitcher. He bats and throws right-handed.

== Amateur career ==
While attending Bugil High School in Cheonan, Chungcheongnam-do, Ko was a starting pitcher in the team. During his last year in 2008, Ko developed into an ace pitcher for the team, posting 3-3 with a 2.44 ERA in 55.1 innings pitched. However, he was not considered a standout on the national level as his team Bugil High School's 2008 season was unimpressive in the national tournaments, being eliminated early in the knockout stages.

== Professional career ==
Ko made himself eligible for the 2009 KBO Draft. He was considered by some scouts to be a late round draft pick. However, the Heroes scouts paid attention to his high strikeout numbers (9.1 K/9) as a starter, and Ko was eventually selected as the 22nd overall pick in the draft by the Heroes.

Ko spent his first professional season in the Heroes "B" team before progressing to the first team where he made his debut in relief against the Lotte Giants on April 15, 2010. In that game, Ko pitched 2/3 innings of shutout ball. His first KBO league win came as a starter on May 12 against the Kia Tigers, tossing six innings and surrendering only one run on eight hits. A week later, Ko pitched 7 1/3 no-hitter innings against the SK Wyverns, but lost the no-hit game with one out in the eighth inning when he allowed a double to the 23rd batter. Ko compiled a 2–2 record and a 2.11 ERA as of May 30, when he hurled eight shutout innings against the LG Twins and only surrendered three hits in that span. However, Ko struggled, going 3–5 with a 5.03 ERA from June to the end of the regular season. For the entire season, Ko's record was 5–7 with a 4.12 ERA in 131.0 innings pitched. After the 2010 season, Ko was selected for the South Korea national baseball team to compete in the Intercontinental Cup held in Taichung.

=== Notable international careers ===
Year	Venue	Competition	Team	Individual Note
2010	Chinese Taipei	Intercontinental Cup	6th	1-1; 2.25 ERA (3 G, 12.0 IP, 3 ER, 10 K)
