= Ahn Hyun-min =

South Korean baseball player (born 2003)

KT Wiz – No. 23
- Outfielder
- Born: 22 August 2003 (age 22); Gimhae, South Gyeongsang Province South Korea
- Bats: Right Throws: Right

KBO debut
- 30 May, 2024, for the KT Wiz

KBO statistics (through 8 March 2026)
- Batting average: .326
- Home runs: 23
- Runs batted in: 82
- Stats at Baseball Reference

Teams
- KT Wiz (2022–present)

Career highlights and awards
- KBO Rookie of the Year (2025); KBO Golden Glove Award (2025)

Ahn Hyun-min (Korean: 안현민; born 22 August 2003) is a South Korean professional baseball outfielder currently playing for the KT Wiz of the KBO League.

He won the KBO League Rookie of the Year Award and KBO Golden Glove Award (outfielder category) in 2025.
