= Jeong Cheol-won =

South Korean baseball player

Kiwoom Heroes
- Pitcher
- Born: March 27, 1999 (age 27); Cheongju, North Chungcheong Province, South Korea
- Bats: Right Throws: Right

KBO debut
- May 6, 2018, for the Doosan Bears

KBO statistics (through July 8, 2024)
- Win–loss record: 13–10
- Earned run average: 3.72
- Strikeouts: 122
- Stats at Baseball Reference

Teams
- Doosan Bears (2018–2024); Lotte Giants (2025–2026); Kiwoom Heroes (2027–present)

Career highlights and awards
- KBO Rookie of the Year (2022)

Jeong Cheol-won (Korean: 정철원; born March 27, 1999) is a South Korean professional baseball player for the Lotte Giants of the KBO League. Jeong won the KBO League Rookie of the Year Award in 2022.

On November 20, 2026, Jeong moved to the Heroes in a one-a-one trade.
