= No Jin-hyuk =

South Korean baseball player (born 1989)

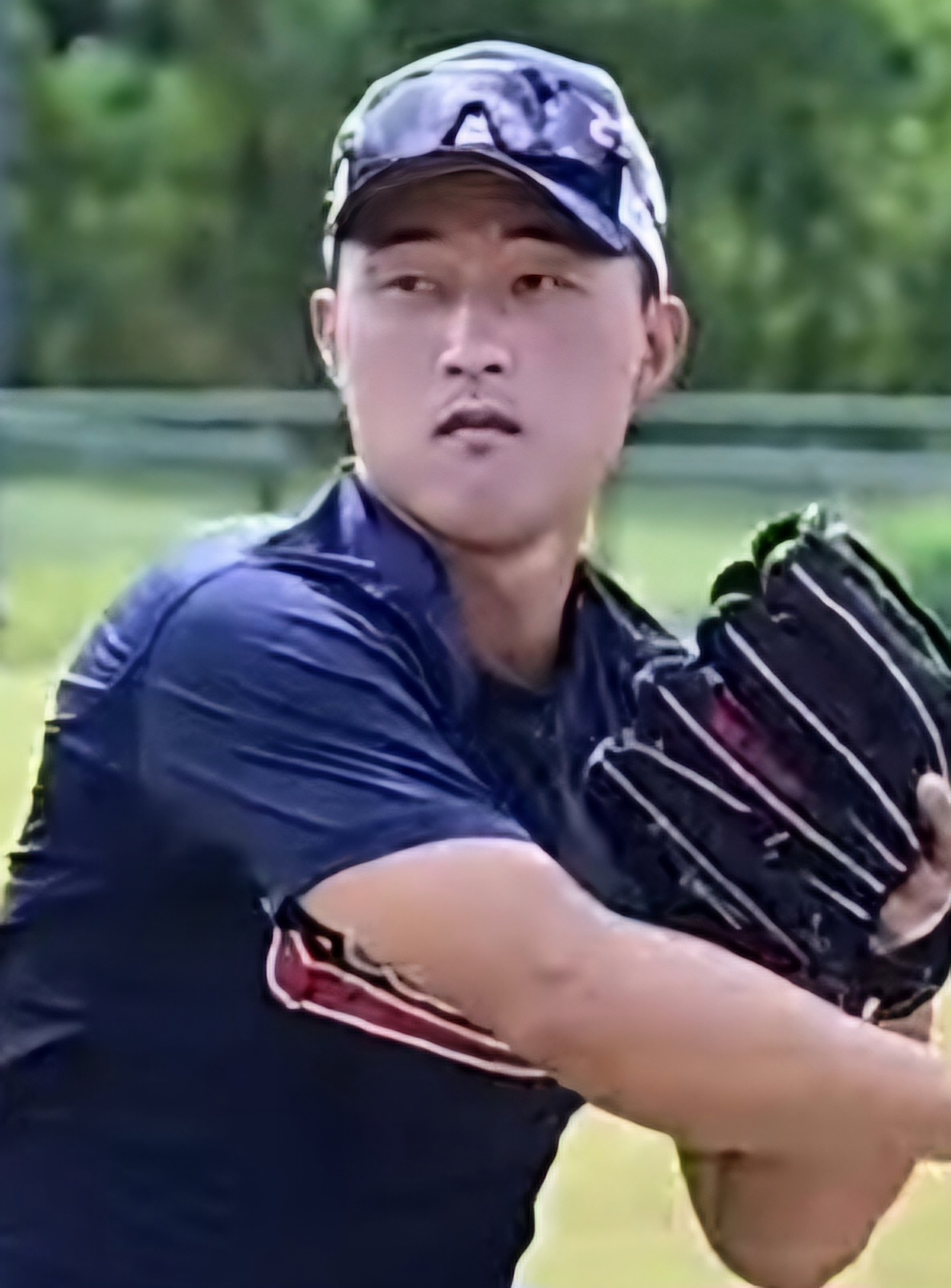

Lotte Giants – No. 52
- Shortstop
- Born: July 15, 1989 (age 36); Gwangju, South Korea
- Bats: Left Throws: Right

KBO debut
- April 2, 2013, for the NC Dinos

KBO statistics (through 2025 season)
- Batting average: .263
- Home runs: 78
- Runs batted in: 400
- Stats at Baseball Reference

Teams
- NC Dinos (2013–2022); Lotte Giants (2023–present)

- No Jin-hyuk
- Hangul: 노진혁
- Hanja: 盧珍赫
- RR: No Jinhyeok
- MR: No Chinhyŏk

No Jin-hyuk (Korean: 노진혁; Hanja: 盧珍赫; born July 15, 1989) is a South Korean professional baseball shortstop for the Lotte Giants of the KBO League. He bats left-handed and throws right-handed.

== Amateur career ==
As a five-tool player No was a fixture in the starting lineup beginning his freshman year at Sungkyunkwan University. Although he primarily played as a shortstop, No was utilized at third base and first base as well. As an amateur player No was selected for the South Korea national baseball team and competed in the Baseball World Cup twice in 2009 and 2011.

=== Notable international careers ===
Year	Venue	Competition	Team	Individual note
2009	Europe	Baseball World Cup	9th	.000 BA (0-for-6), 1 RBI, 1 BB
2010	Japan	World University Baseball Championship	4th	.000 BA (0-for-2)
2011	Panama	Baseball World Cup	6th	.400 BA (2-for-5), 1 R, 1 BB

== Professional career ==
No was selected 21st overall by the NC Dinos in the 2012 KBO Draft. Although No batted a disappointing .194 with 2 home runs and 25 RBI in the 2012 Futures League, he became the Dinos' starting shortstop showing great defensive skills.

The Dinos' starting shortstop for the 2013 season was 2007 KBO batting champion Lee Hyun-gon who was traded from the Kia Tigers as a free agent. However, he was replaced by No early on, who showed better offensive and defensive stats as a backup shortstop. On April 27, 2013, No hit his first KBO league home run, which was an inside the park, against starting pitcher Kim Sun-woo of the Doosan Bears.

In 2014, the Dinos signed free-agent shortstop Son Si-hyun from the Doosan Bears and moved No back to the bench. After spending two mediocre seasons, No left the Dinos for another two seasons to serve mandatory military service.

As Son's both offensive and defensive skills deteriorated significantly, No became starting shortstop for the Dinos in the 2018 season when he played 125 games and batted .283, 42 runs batted in (RBI), 21 doubles and 11 home runs. The next season, he finished third on the team with 13 home runs, a .264 batting average, 43 RBIs and 23 doubles in 110 games.
