= Shin Jae-young =

South Korean baseball player (born 1989)

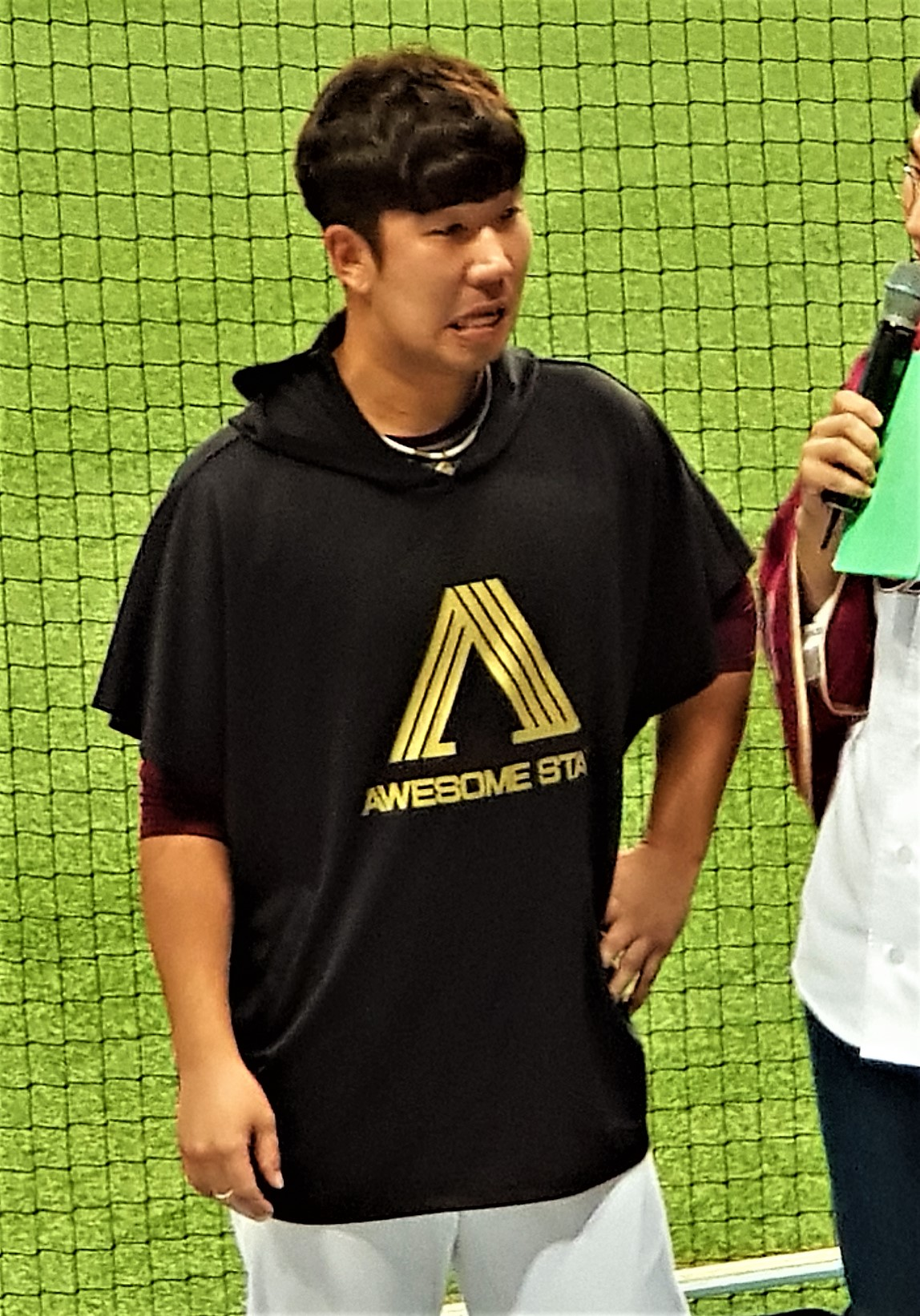
- Pitcher
- Born: November 18, 1989 (age 36); Daejeon, South Korea
- Batted: Right Threw: Right

KBO debut
- April 6, 2016, for the Nexen Heroes

Last KBO appearance
- July 6, 2022, for the SSG Landers

KBO statistics
- Win–loss record: 30–23
- Earned run average: 4.97
- Strikeouts: 280
- Stats at Baseball Reference

Teams
- Nexen / Kiwoom Heroes (2016–2020); SSG Landers (2021–2022)

Career highlights and awards
- KBO Rookie of the Year (2016)

- Shin Jae-young
- Hangul: 신재영
- Hanja: 申在永
- RR: Sin Jaeyeong
- MR: Sin Chaeyŏng

Shin Jae-young (born November 18, 1989) is a South Korean former professional baseball pitcher for the Kiwoom Heroes of the KBO League.

== 2016 ==
Jae-young won the KBO Rookie of the Year Award with an ERA of 15 wins, seven losses, and 3.90 wins in the 2016 season. Because of these achievements, the company signed an annual salary contract for the next season for 110 million won, a 307% increase.
