= Yoon Suk-min =

South Korean baseball player (born 1986)

- Pitcher
- Born: July 24, 1986 (age 39); Guri, Gyeonggi-do, South Korea
- Batted: Right Threw: Right

KBO debut
- April 2, 2005, for the Kia Tigers

Last KBO appearance
- October 12, 2018, for the Kia Tigers

KBO statistics
- Win–loss record: 77–75
- Saves: 86
- Earned run average: 3.29
- Strikeouts: 1,072
- Stats at Baseball Reference

Teams
- Kia Tigers (2005–2013, 2015–2018)

Career highlights and awards
- Korean Triple Crown (2011); 2× KBO ERA title (2008, 2011); KBO Win title (2011); KBO strikeout title (2011); Korean Series champion (2009); 3× KBO All-Star Game (2008, 2009, 2011); KBO MVP (2011); KBO Golden Glove (2011)
Medals
Men's baseball
Representing South Korea
Olympic Games
Gold medal – first place	2008 Beijing	Team
World Baseball Classic
Silver medal – second place	2009 Los Angeles	Team
Asian Games
Gold medal – first place	2010 Guangzhou	Team
Bronze medal – third place	2006 Doha	Team

- Yoon Suk-min
- Hangul: 윤석민
- Hanja: 尹錫珉
- RR: Yun Seokmin
- MR: Yun Sŏngmin

Yoon Suk-min (Korean: 윤석민; born July 24, 1986) is a South Korean former professional baseball pitcher. He bats and throws right-handed. He played for the Kia Tigers of the KBO League from 2005 to 2013, and 2015 to 2018. He also played one season with the Baltimore Orioles organization in 2014.

Yoon is a 6 ft 0 in, 190 lb right-handed pitcher. With a three-quarters delivery Yoon throws a fastball at 90-92 mph (tops out at 96 mph), a change-up, an occasional curveball, and a hard-breaking, mid-80s slider. With a shoulder injury his fastball dipped into high-80s, and he converted to relief during the 2013 season.

== Professional career ==
=== Kia Tigers (2005–2013) ===
The Kia Tigers selected Yoon with the first pick in the second round of the 2005 Korea Baseball Organization (KBO) draft. Yoon made his professional debut with the Tigers on April 2, 2005. In his rookie season, he showed signs of promise, with a 4.29 earned run average (ERA) in 84 innings pitched across 53 games as the Tigers' primary setup man. In 2006, Yoon played as a middle reliever and closer for the Tigers, and collected nine holds and 19 saves.

In 2007, Yoon joined the starting rotation due to the Tigers' ace Han Ki-joo's transition to a closing pitcher. Yoon had a 7-18 win–loss record with a 3.78 ERA as a starter. While his ERA was decent, he had poor run support in 18 of his losses, the most in the 2007 season. This gave him the nickname "The Unfortunate Ace". In 2008, Yoon emerged as one of the most consistent pitchers in the KBO league, going 14–5 with a 2.33 ERA and 119 strikeouts in 154 2/3 innings pitched. He won the ERA title and finished runner-up to Kim Kwang-hyun in wins.

In August 2008, Yoon competed for the South Korean national baseball team in the 2008 Summer Olympics, where they won the gold medal in the baseball tournament. He was 2–0 with a save, a 2.34 ERA and six strikeouts, pitching 7 2/3 innings in five games as a utility pitcher. In March 2009, Yoon competed for the South Korea national baseball team in the 2009 World Baseball Classic, where he went 2–0 with a 1.13 ERA and 13 strikeouts in 16 innings pitched, appearing in 4 games. He started against Venezuela in the semifinal game, and led South Korea to a 10–2 victory. Yoon baffled the South American major league all-star squad, allowing only two runs and seven hits in 6 1/3 innings pitched.

In the beginning of the 2009 KBO season, Yoon became the Tigers' closer again as Han Ki-joo was put on the disabled list. As a closer, he posted seven saves with a 2.45 ERA. Yoon returned to the starting rotation but was put on the disabled list for a month. In July, he returned from the injury and won all of his 7 decisions as a starter. However, he had the worst pitching performance in his pro career on September 5, allowing 10 runs in 3 1/3 innings against the Doosan Bears, and was then sidelined with a shoulder injury for the rest of the season. Yoon finished the season with a record of 9–4 with 7 saves, an ERA of 3.46 and 117 strikeouts in 119 2/3 innings pitched which didn't enable him to qualify for the ERA title.

Yoon was named Most Valuable Player (MVP) for the 2011 season. He received the KBO's highest honor for leading the league in four pitching categories, marking a 2.45 ERA, 17 wins, 178 strikeouts, and a .773 winning percentage in 172 1/3 innings. He is the first pitcher to stand at top of four categories since Korean pitching legend, Sun Dong-yeol accomplished the feat in 1991.

=== Baltimore Orioles (2014) ===
A free agent after the 2013 season, Yoon announced his intentions to play in Major League Baseball. Yoon reportedly agreed to a three-year contract, worth US$5.75 million, with the Baltimore Orioles. On February 17, 2014, Yoon passed his physicals and officially signed with the Orioles. Yoon pitched for the Norfolk Tides of the Triple–A International League, where he had a 4–8 record and a 5.74 ERA in 23 appearances. He was outrighted off the Orioles roster on August 30, 2014.

The Orioles opted not to invite Yoon to spring training in 2015. He chose to return to Korea rather than report to the Orioles' minor league camp. The Orioles released Yoon, with Yoon agreeing to forego the remainder of his contract.

=== Kia Tigers (2015–2018) ===
Yoon signed a four-year contract to return to the Tigers worth ₩9 billion (US$8.2 million), the largest contract signed by a free agent in KBO.

In 2015, his role was closer. He had a 2.96 ERA, 2–6 record, and 30 saves.

=== After Baseball ===
Yoon retired in 2019 after a shoulder injury derailed his career. He is currently attempting to become a professional golfer.

=== Achievements ===
- 2008 ERA Title
- 2008 WHIP Leader
- 2011 KBO MVP
- 2011 Golden glove

=== Notable international careers ===
Year	Venue	Competition	Team	Individual note
2006	Qatar	Asian Games	Bronze medal	0-0; 0.00 ERA (2 G, 4.2 IP, 0 ER, 6K)
2008	China	Olympic Games	Gold medal	2-0; 1 SV, 2.34 ERA (5 G, 7.2 IP, 2 ER, 6K)
2009	United States	World Baseball Classic	Silver medal	2-0, 1.13 ERA (4 G, 16 IP, 2 ER, 13K)
2010	China	Asian Games	Gold medal	1-0, 0.00 ERA (2 G, 6 IP, 0 ER)
