= Hee-seop Choi =

Korean baseball player (born 1979)

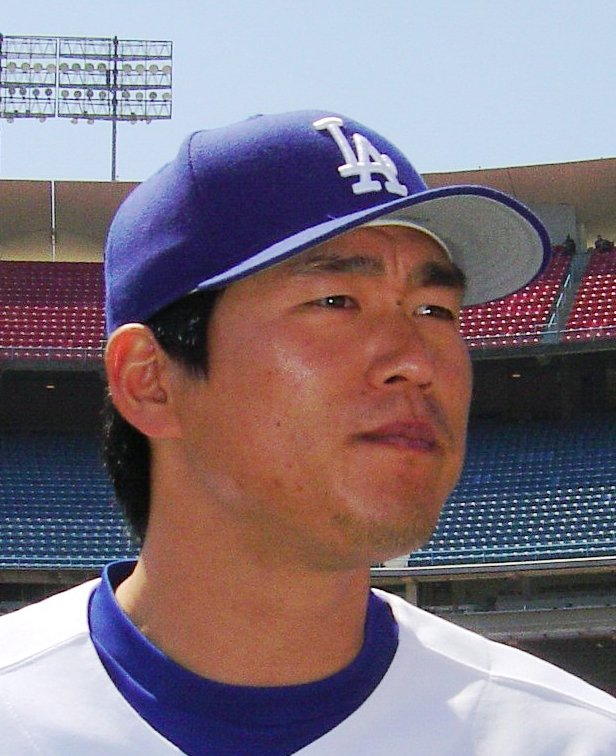
- Choi with the Los Angeles Dodgers in 2005

Kia Tigers – No. 78
- First baseman / Coach
- Born: March 16, 1979 (age 47); Yeongam, South Korea
- Batted: Left Threw: Left

Professional debut
- MLB: September 3, 2002, for the Chicago Cubs
- KBO: May 19, 2007, for the Kia Tigers

Last appearance
- MLB: October 2, 2005, for the Los Angeles Dodgers
- KBO: 2015, for the Kia Tigers

MLB statistics
- Batting average: .240
- Home runs: 40
- Runs batted in: 120

KBO statistics
- Batting average: .291
- Home runs: 100
- Runs batted in: 393
- Stats at Baseball Reference

Teams
- Chicago Cubs (2002–2003); Florida Marlins (2004); Los Angeles Dodgers (2004–2005); Kia Tigers (2007–2015)

Career highlights and awards
- Korean Series champion (2009); KBO League Golden Glove Award (2009)

- Hee-seop Choi
- Hangul: 최희섭
- Hanja: 崔熙燮
- RR: Choe Huiseop
- MR: Ch'oe Hŭisŏp

Hee-seop Choi (/ˌhiː ˌsɒp ˈtʃɔɪ/; Korean: 최희섭; Hanja: 崔熙燮; [tɕʰø.ɦi.sʌp̚]; born March 16, 1979) is a South Korean former professional baseball first baseman. He played in Major League Baseball (MLB) for the Chicago Cubs, Florida Marlins, and Los Angeles Dodgers and in the KBO League for the Kia Tigers. He was the first Korean-born position player to play in the major leagues.

== Early life and amateur career ==
Choi was born in Yeongam County, South Jeolla Province, South Korea on March 19, 1979. He graduated from Gwangju Jeil High School in Gwangju, South Korea, in 1998. He attended Korea University in 1998 and was a member of the South Korea national baseball team that finished second in the 1998 Baseball World Cup. He was scouted and signed by Leon Lee, the father of former major league first baseman Derrek Lee. Coincidentally, he later was traded to the Marlins for Lee.

== Professional career ==
=== Chicago Cubs ===
Beginning in 1999, Choi spent four seasons in the Cubs minor league system and was considered to be one of the organization's top prospects. On September 3, 2002, Choi made his Major League debut against the Milwaukee Brewers and became the first Korean-born position player to play in the Major Leagues.

In 2003, Choi played in 80 games, hitting .218 with eight home runs and 28 RBI. He was the Opening Day starter for the Cubs, but suffered a concussion following a collision with teammate pitcher Kerry Wood on June 7, 2003. Choi went on the disabled list, and never reclaimed his starting role. After the season, he was traded to the Florida Marlins for Derrek Lee.

=== Florida Marlins ===
With his new team, Choi began the 2004 season impressively batting .295 with nine home runs and 18 RBIs in April. But his stay with the Marlins was a brief one. On July 30, he was traded to the Los Angeles Dodgers along with Brad Penny and minor league pitcher Bill Murphy for Paul Lo Duca, Guillermo Mota, and Juan Encarnación.

=== Los Angeles Dodgers ===
Choi went on to bat only .161 for the remainder of the 2004 season with the Dodgers, leading many to criticize the Dodgers' sabermetrician general manager Paul DePodesta for acquiring him. Sabermetric baseball analysts claimed that Choi did not get enough playing time because of bias from the Dodgers' old school managerial style, which kept rookies on the bench for extended periods of time. Jim Tracy reportedly said that he did not start Choi on one particular day because Adam Eaton was pitching and Eaton has a unique arm angle in his pitching delivery.

Choi's production picked up during the 2005 season as he played in 133 games that season and posted a .253 batting average, while hitting 15 home runs and driving in 42 runs. The highlight of Choi's season came during a weekend series against the Minnesota Twins from June 10–12, when he accomplished the rare feat of hitting six home runs in a three-game series.

However, during the 2005–2006 off-season, DePodesta was fired by Dodgers owner Frank McCourt, and new general manager Ned Colletti signed Nomar Garciaparra to be the everyday first baseman. Rather than keeping Choi on the bench or blocking prospect James Loney's path to the big leagues, Colletti decided to waive Choi during spring training; he was subsequently claimed by the Boston Red Sox.

=== Post-Dodgers ===
Choi represented South Korea in the 2006 World Baseball Classic, in which his most significant contribution was hitting a three-run pinch-hit home run against Team USA.

Choi spent the entire 2006 season with Pawtucket. He was designated for assignment August 1, 2006, while on Pawtucket's disabled list and removed from Boston's 40-man roster. Choi cleared waivers on August 11, 2006, and was outrighted to Pawtucket.

On December 1, 2006, Choi signed a minor league contract with the Tampa Bay Devil Rays where he was given a shot to be Tampa Bay's everyday first baseman. Choi decided to return home after failing to make Tampa Bay's 40-man roster after 2007 spring training.

=== Kia Tigers ===
On May 14, 2007, Choi signed with the Kia Tigers in the Korea Baseball Organization. In his KBO debut game, He went 0-for-5 against the Doosan Bears. Choi finished his first KBO season with a .337 batting average, 7 home runs and 45 RBI, playing in 52 games.

Choi began the 2008 season in a slump due to a waist injury, finishing the month of April with a batting average of just .208 and going 25-for-120 to close out the month, and was then demoted to the Korean minor league affiliate of the Kia Tigers. In July, he returned to the 26-man first-team roster, but finished the season with disappointing offensive numbers, batting .229 with only 6 home runs and 22 RBI.

In 2009, Choi broke out offensively and became a star, rebounding from his subpar year. He helped lift the Tigers into title contention, batting .308, blasting a pro career-best 33 home runs, leading the KBO league in runs with 98 and helping them win the 2009 KBO regular season. Choi was the runner-up in home runs (33), RBI (100), and walks (103), 4th in slugging percentage (.589), 6th in on-base percentage (.435), and 11th in batting average (.308). Choi and Kim Sang-hyeon hit 69 home runs, and the two together were called the "CK Cannon".

On December 11, 2009, he obtained his first KBO League Golden Glove Award nomination for his play at 1st base.

In 2010, Choi had a .286 batting average, with 21 home runs, 84 RBIs, and drew 81 walks. Choi received an all-star selection and also participated in the home run derby, where he set the record for longest home run.

In 2011, Choi was limited to 70 games due to injury. He hit .281, with 9 home runs and 37 RBI.

In 2012, Choi hit .252, with 7 home runs and 42 RBI in another injury-plagued season.

In 2013, Choi hit .258, with 11 home runs and 42 RBI. After the season, he underwent knee surgery.

== Achievements ==
- 2009 Runs Leader (KBO)
- 2009 Golden Glove Award (First baseman)

== All-Star appearances ==
- Choi was one of eight representatives in the 2005 Home Run Derby, representing South Korea. Although he lasted only one round, he matched The Netherlands' representative, Andruw Jones, with a total of five home runs. He did not feature in the All-Star game.
