= Song Eun-beom =

South Korean baseball player

Samsung Lions – No. 46
- Pitcher
- Born: March 17, 1984 (age 42); Incheon
- Bats: Right Throws: Right

KBO debut
- 2003, for the SK Wyverns

KBO statistics (through 2025)
- Win–loss record: 88–95
- Earned run average: 4.55
- Strikeouts: 950
- Stats at Baseball Reference

Teams
- SK Wyverns (2003–2013); Kia Tigers (2013–2014); Hanwha Eagles (2015–2018); LG Twins (2019–2023); Samsung Lions (2024–present)

- Song Eun-beom
- Hangul: 송은범
- Hanja: 宋恩範
- RR: Song Eunbeom
- MR: Song Ŭnbŏm

Song Eun-beom (born March 17, 1984) is a South Korean professional baseball player for the LG Twins of the KBO League. He has represented the South Korea national baseball team at the 2010 Asian Games.
