= An Chi-hong =

South Korean baseball player (born 1990)

Kiwoom Heroes
- Second baseman
- Born: July 2, 1990 (age 35); Seoul, South Korea
- Bats: Right Throws: Right

KBO debut
- April 4, 2009, for the Kia Tigers

KBO statistics (through 2025 season)
- Batting average: .294
- Home runs: 155
- Runs batted in: 927
- Stats at Baseball Reference

Teams
- Kia Tigers (2009–2019); Lotte Giants (2020–2023); Hanwha Eagles (2024–2025)

Career highlights and awards
- 2009 KBO All-Star Game MVP; Korean Series champion (2009); KBO Golden Glove Award winner (2011)
Medals
Men's baseball
Representing South Korea
Asian Games
Gold medal – first place	2018 Asian Games	Team
World Junior Baseball Championship
Gold medal – first place	2008 Edmonton	Team

An Chi-hong (Korean: 안치홍; Hanja: 安致弘; born July 2, 1990) is a South Korean professional baseball infielder for the Lotte Giants of the KBO League. He bats and throws right-handed.

== Amateur career ==
While attending Seoul High School in Seoul, An was considered one of the top shortstops in the Korean high school baseball league. As a sophomore, he drew national attention at the President's Cup National High School Baseball Championship held in April 2007, where his team finished runner-up and An won batting, home runs and RBI titles.

== Professional career ==
Drafted by the Kia Tigers in the 2nd round (1st pick, 9th overall) of the 2009 KBO Draft, An made his pro debut on April 4, 2009. On July 2, he became the fourth straight-from-high-school rookie to hit double digit home runs in KBO history, smacking two home runs against the Samsung Lions.

An was selected for the Best 10 of the 2009 KBO All-Star Game. He became the first rookie player to earn the All-Star Best 10 honors since Lee Byung-Kyu and Jin Kab-Yong in 1997. In the All-Star Game in Gwangju on July 25, A hit a two-run home run in the 5th inning, which made him the youngest ever to be named KBO All-Star Game MVP.

An finished his rookie season with a batting average of .235 (44th in the league) and 14 home runs. Although An was the only rookie player to be eligible for the batting title in the 2009 season, having 436 plate appearances in 123 games, he failed to make the Rookie of the Year title, losing out to saves champion Lee Yong-Chan of the Doosan Bears.

== International career ==
In August 2007, he was selected for the South Korea national junior baseball team and participated in the Asian Junior Baseball Championship held in Taichung, Taiwan.

In 2008, An was selected for the South Korea national junior baseball team again to compete at the World Junior Baseball Championship, where they claimed their fifth tournament title. In the tourney, he batted .333 (10-for-30) with 8 RBIs and 8 runs, playing in all 8 games as a second and third baseman, and was named Best Defensive Player.

In 2018, he represented South Korea at the 2018 Asian Games.

Year	Venue	Competition	Team	Individual note
2007	Chinese Taipei	Asian Junior Baseball Championship	Silver medal	.111 BA (1-for-9)
2008	Canada	World Junior Baseball Championship	Gold medal	.333 BA (10-for-30), 8 RBI, 8 R, 5 BB; Best Defensive Player

== Awards and honors ==
- 2009 All-Star Game MVP
- 2011 Gold Glove second baseman.
