= Gwangju Mudeung Baseball Stadium =

Stadium in Gwangju, South Korea

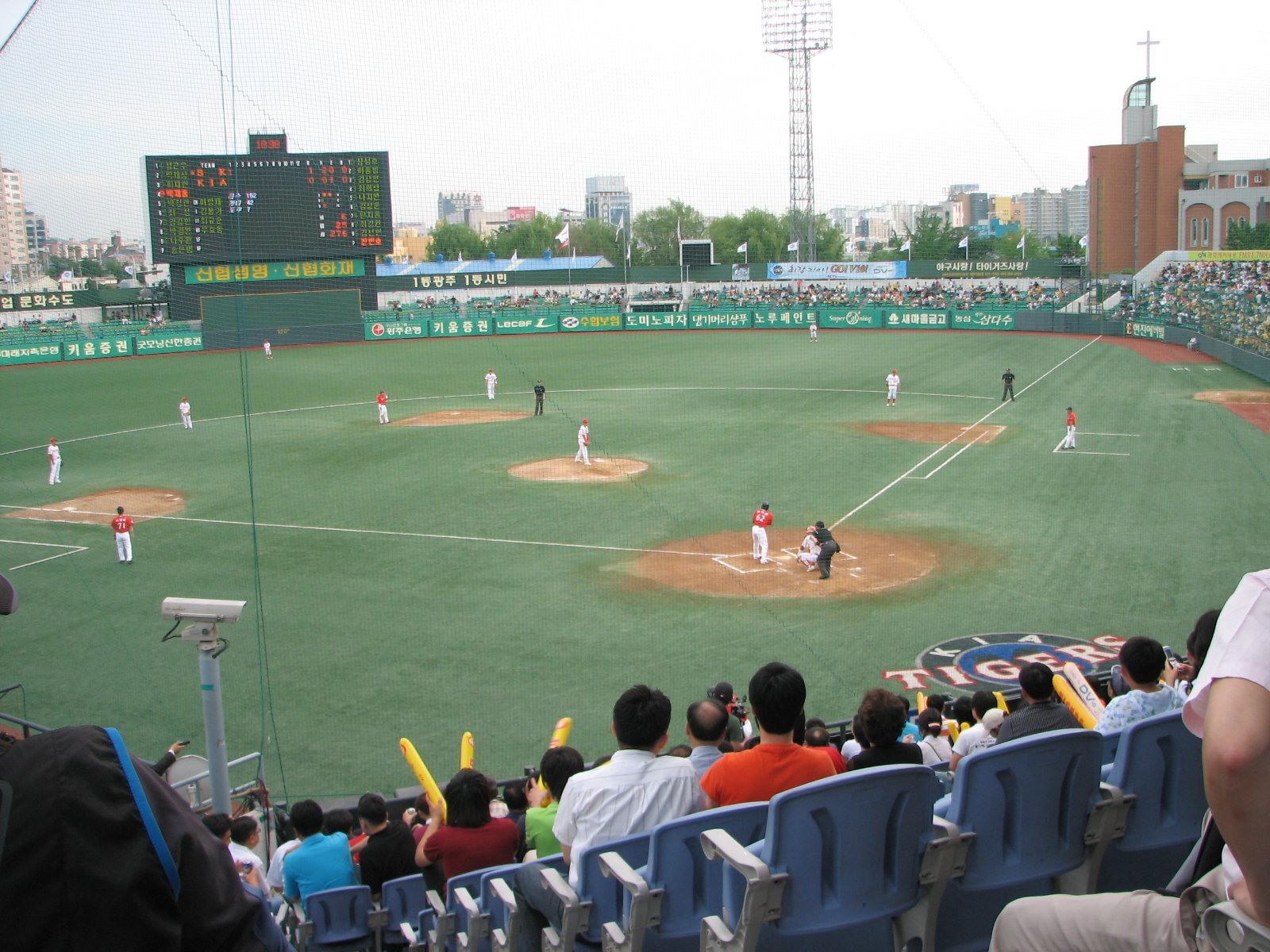
- Interactive map of Gwangju Mudeung Baseball Stadium
- Location: 620 Im-dong, Buk-gu, Gwangju, South Korea
- Coordinates: 35°10′08″N 126°53′14″E
- Owner: City of Gwangju
- Capacity: 12,500 (past)
- Surface: Natural grass
- Field size: Left Field - 99 metres (325 ft); Left-Center - 116 metres (381 ft); Center Field - 120 metres (394 ft); Right-Center - 116 metres (381 ft); Right Field - 99 metres (325 ft); Outfield Wall Height - 3.1 metres (10 ft)

Construction
- Opened: September 30, 1965
- Closed: 4 October 2013

Tenants
- Haitai Tigers (KBO) (1982–2000); Kia Tigers (KBO) (2001–2013)

Gwangju Mudeung Baseball Stadium (Korean: 광주무등경기장 야구장) is a baseball stadium in Gwangju, South Korea. It is used mostly for baseball games and was the home stadium of Kia Tigers, formerly the Haitai Tigers, between 1982 and 2013.

It was renovated as an amateur field in 2023.

== See also ==
- Gwangju Mudeung Stadium
