= Oh Ju-won =

South Korean baseball player

- Relief pitcher
- Born: March 31, 1985 (age 40)
- Batted: Left Threw: Left

KBO debut
- April 4, 2004, for the Hyundai Unicorns

Last KBO appearance
- September 25, 2021, for the Kiwoom Heroes

KBO statistics
- Win–loss record: 41–57
- Earned run average: 4.67
- Strikeouts: 525
- Holds: 84

Teams
- Hyundai Unicorns (2004–2006); Sangmu Baseball Team (2006–2008); Nexen / Kiwoom Heroes (2009–2021)

Career highlights and awards
- 2004 Korean Series champion; 2004 KBO Rookie of the Year

- Oh Ju-won
- Hangul: 오주원
- RR: O Juwon
- MR: O Chuwŏn

Oh Ju-won (Korean: 오주원; born March 31, 1985) is a South Korean relief pitcher who played for the Kiwoom Heroes of the KBO League. He bats and throws left-handed.

== Amateur career ==
While attending Cheongwon High School in Seoul, Oh was considered one of the top lefty high school pitching prospects. In 2003, he was selected for the South Korea national junior baseball team and competed in the 5th Asian Junior Baseball Championship held in Bangkok, Thailand, where South Korea won its second Asian Championship, beating Chinese Taipei in the final game.

=== Notable international career ===
Year	Venue	Competition	Team
2003	Thailand	Asian Junior Baseball Championship	Gold medal

== Professional career ==
Upon graduation from Cheongwon High School in Seoul, Oh was drafted by the Hyundai Unicorns in the 2nd round (12th overall) of the 2004 KBO Draft. In the 2004 KBO season, Oh immediately earned a spot in the Unicorns starting rotation as a rookie. He finished his rookie season with a record of 10-9, an ERA of 3.99 and 113 strikeouts in 149 innings pitched. Oh helped lead the Unicorns to the 2004 Korean Series, where he started Game 5. In that game, Oh earned a win, allowing only one run over 5.1 innings against the Samsung Lions. At the end of the season, Oh won the 2004 KBO Rookie of the Year Award.

In 2005, Oh suffered a disastrous and injury-riddled sophomore slump, finishing the season with a 1-11 record and a 6.01 ERA.

In 2006, Oh only appeared in 4 games, posting a 1-1 record and a 4.61 ERA in 13.2 innings pitched. After the season, he joined the Korea Armed Forces Athletic Corps Baseball Team to serve two years of mandatory military service.

In 2009, Oh returned to the pro league after finishing the military duty but had a mediocre comeback season, posting a 1-2 record and 5 holds with a 4.08 ERA as a relief pitcher.

In 2010, Oh played a vital role in the Heroes' bullpen, appearing in a team-leading 69 games (4th in the league). He lowered his ERA to 2.38 and notched 9 holds with a record of 1-0.

In 2011, Oh had the best season as a setup man, racking up a career-high 20 holds which ranked him third behind Jung Woo-Ram's 25 and Jong Hyun-Wook's 24. He was the only Hero relief pitcher to appear in over 60 games for two consecutive seasons.

After 2019 season, he earned FA qualification and stayed at 700 million won for two years.
