= Puerto Rico national under-18 baseball team =

Puerto Rico Baseball U-18

Information
- Country: Puerto Rico
- Federation: Federación de Béisbol Aficionado de Puerto Rico
- Confederation: Pan American Baseball Confederation

WBSC ranking
- Current: 7 (26 October 2026)

The Puerto Rico national under-18 baseball team is the national under-18 team representing Puerto Rico in international baseball competitions. The organization is currently ranked 16th in the world by the World Baseball Softball Confederation. They compete in the bi-annual U-18 Baseball World Cup.

== See also ==
- Puerto Rico national baseball team
- Federación de Béisbol Aficionado de Puerto Rico
- U-18 Baseball World Cup
