= Aquilino López =

Dominican baseball player (born 1975)

- Pitcher
- Born: April 21, 1975 (age 50); Villa Altagracia, Dominican Republic
- Batted: Right Threw: Right

Professional debut
- MLB: April 2, 2003, for the Toronto Blue Jays
- KBO: April 5, 2009, for the Kia Tigers

Last appearance
- MLB: September 29, 2008, for the Detroit Tigers
- KBO: June 5, 2012, for the SK Wyverns

MLB statistics
- Win–loss record: 6–6
- Earned run average: 3.78
- Strikeouts: 167

KBO statistics
- Win–loss record: 32–26
- Earned run average: 3.88
- Strikeouts: 331
- Stats at Baseball Reference

Teams
- Toronto Blue Jays (2003–2004); Colorado Rockies (2005); Philadelphia Phillies (2005); Detroit Tigers (2007–2008); Kia Tigers (2009–2011); SK Wyverns (2012)

Career highlights and awards
- Korean Series champion (2009); KBO Golden Glove Award (2009)

Aquilino López Roa (born April 21, 1975) is a Dominican former professional baseball player who played in Major League Baseball and the KBO League. He batted and threw right-handed.

== Professional career ==
Lopez was first signed by the Seattle Mariners on July 3, 1997, and made his Major League debut on April 2, 2003, after being selected by the Toronto Blue Jays on December 16, 2002, as a Rule 5 draftee. He made 72 appearances in 2003 for the Blue Jays, recording 14 saves and posting a 3.42 ERA over 73 2/3 innings.

In 2004, Lopez was still in Toronto where he pitched only 21 innings in 18 appearances. He was a member of the Colorado Rockies, Los Angeles Dodgers, Philadelphia Phillies and San Diego Padres organizations from 2005 to 2006, mostly as a Minor League player. Lopez signed with the Detroit Tigers before the 2007 season.

In 2008, after spending most of the season with the Tigers, Lopez was sent down to Toledo when Fernando Rodney was activated from the disabled list. Lopez was called up to Detroit July 2 when Zach Miner was sent to Toledo. Although his ERA on the season was a comparatively low 3.55, he allowed 50.9% of inherited runners to score, the second-highest in the American League. Lopez became a free agent after the 2008 season when the Tigers declined to offer arbitration.

Lopez was signed by the Kia Tigers of the Korea Baseball Organization on January 14, 2009. In the 2009 KBO season, he went 14–5 with a 3.12 ERA and 129 strikeouts, leading the league in wins and innings pitched (190.1). Lopez won Game 1 and Game 5 of the 2009 Korean Series and recorded two outs in the eighth inning of the seventh game, which Kia won on a walk-off home run in the ninth. The Game 5 win was a complete-game shutout. On December 11, 2009, it was announced that Lopez was awarded the KBO Golden Glove Award for pitcher. His final season in Korea was 2012 when he started 5 games for the SK Wyverns.

=== Achievements ===
- 2009 Most Wins title (KBO)
- 2009 Most Innings Pitched leader (KBO)
- 2009 Golden Glove Award (Pitcher) (KBO)

== Pitching style ==
Lopez throws an 89–91 MPH four-seam fastball, a 79–81 MPH slider, an 83–85 MPH changeup, a 78–79 MPH curveball, and an occasional 84–86 MPH splitter.

== See also ==
- Rule 5 draft results
