= Kia Tigers =

Korean baseball team in Gwangju, South Korea

- KIA 타이거즈

Logo	Cap insignia

Information
- League: KBO League (1982–present)
- Location: Gwangju
- Ballpark: Gwangju-Kia Champions Field (2014–present)
- Established: January 30, 1982; 44 years ago
- Korean Series championships: 1983, 1986, 1987, 1988, 1989, 1991, 1993, 1996, 1997, 2009, 2017, 2024
- League championships: 1988, 1991, 1993, 1996, 1997, 2009, 2017, 2024
- Former name: Haitai Tigers (1982–2001)
- Former ballparks: Gwangju Mudeung Baseball Stadium (1982–2013); Jeonju Baseball Stadium (1982–1989)
- Colors: Red, white, black
- Mascot: Hogeori, Hoyeoni and Harang
- Retired numbers: 7, 18
- Ownership: Kia
- General manager: Sim Jae-hak
- Manager: Lee Bum-ho
- Website: tigers.co.kr

First logo of the Kia Tigers era, used from 2002 to 2009.

The Kia Tigers (Korean: KIA 타이거즈) are a South Korean professional baseball team founded in 1982 and based in the southwestern city of Gwangju. Until 2001, they were known as the Haitai Tigers. The Tigers are members of the KBO League and are the most successful team in Korean baseball, having won the Korean Series championship twelve times with a perfect 12–0 record. Their home stadium is Gwangju-Kia Champions Field in Gwangju.

After the success of the 1980s and 1990s, the fortunes of the team began to turn, resulting in them finishing bottom of the league for the first time in 2005, and again in 2007. In 2009, however, the Tigers won the 2009 KBO season and the 2009 Korean Series.

During the 1980s and 1990s, the team was heavily associated with the Liberal pro-democracy politics of their home region of Honam. As a result, they developed a rivalry with the Samsung Lions of the conservative Yeongnam region.

== History ==
=== 1980s ===
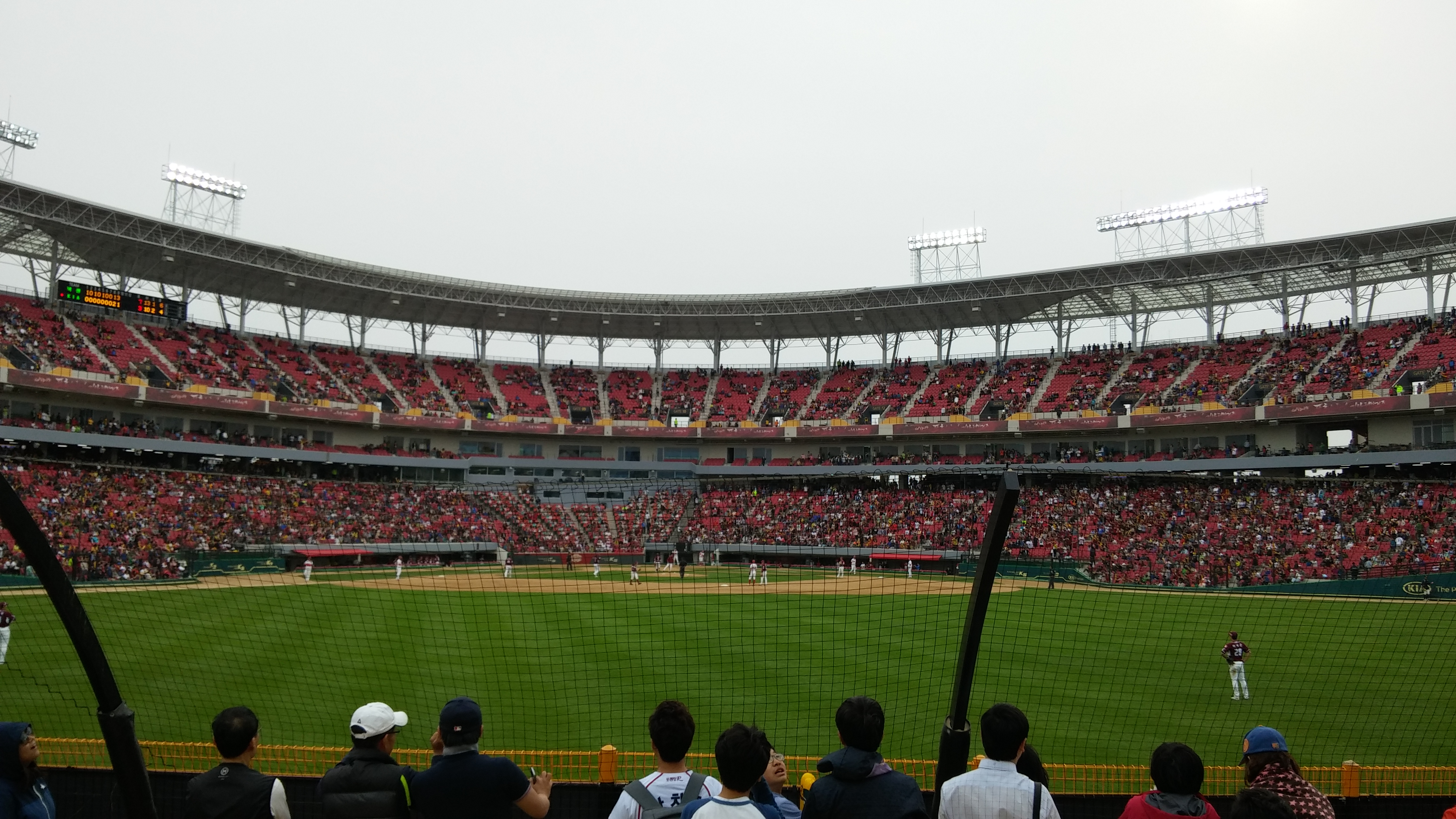
Gwangju-Kia Champions Field, home field of Kia Tigers

Haitai Tigers was the third professional baseball team to be created in South Korea, after the OB Bears and MBC Chungyong. They were founded on January 30, 1982, with 14 players. Kim Dong-yeob, the first manager of the team, was fired after just one month, and Jo Chang-soo took over his position and led the team to a record of 38–42. Due to the lack of position players, many players in the league both pitched and batted. Kim Seong-han, for instance, had a record of ten wins and led the league in RBIs with 69 the first year.

In 1983, Haitai hired Kim Eung-ryong as manager, who had studied baseball in the United States (and had managed Haitai's amateur baseball team from 1964 to 1981). He eventually led the team to its first championship in 1983. The Tigers won the Korean Series 4–0–1 against MBC Chungyong. Although the team did not make it to the playoffs for the next two years, it set the foundation for the golden years to come by signing in future stars Lee Soon-cheol, Sun Dong-yeol, and Kim Seong-han.

Bang Soo-won pitched the first no-hitter in Korean baseball history in 1984 against the Sammi Superstars.

Under manager Kim Eung-ryong in the years 1983 to 1997, the Tigers won nine championships, never losing a Korean Series during that span. In 1986, the Tigers finished in second place in the pennant race with a team ERA of 2.86 and a batting average of .272, to go straight to the Korean Series against the Samsung Lions. They went on to win their second Korean Series 4–1.

Until 1989, the Haitai Tigers won once more against the Samsung Lions and twice against the Binggrae Eagles to complete four consecutive Korean Series wins. Kim Jung-soo, Kim Joon-hwan, Moon Hye-soo, and Park Chul-woo respectively were named MVPs of each series.

=== 1990s ===
The Tigers lost in the playoffs to the Samsung Lions in 1990 but won the next Korean Series the following year. In 1991, the Tigers set a record when the team won six out of ten possible KBO League Golden Glove Awards.

1993 was the year of rookie shortstop Lee Jong-beom, closer Sun Dong-yeol, and starters Lee Dae-jin and Lee Kang-chul. The Tigers won 81 out of 126 games and also their seventh Korean Series, defeating the Samsung Lions.

In 1994, Lee Jong-beom batted an average of 0.393, the second highest in Korean baseball history, but the team lost the semi-playoffs to the Hanhwa Eagles. The Tigers ended up in fourth the next year due to Lee Jong-beom and Lee Dae-jin leaving the team for military service, which is mandatory for all male South Korean citizens over 18.

Star closer Sun Dong-yeol was also transferred to the Chunichi Dragons in 1996, but Lim Chang-yong and Gang Tae-won filled in his position to lead the team to its eighth Korean Series win over the Hyundai Unicorns.

The next year, Lee Jong-beom and Lee Dae-jin returned from military service and with their help the Tigers again won the Korean Series, defeating the LG Twins, to bring the total to nine champion wins.

=== 2000s ===
Due to the Asian financial crisis in 1998, Haitai was forced to sell the team to Kia in 2001. Until then the Tigers were also in financial difficulty, could not convince their major players to stay. Eventually, they lost Lee Jong-beom to the Chunichi Dragons, and closer Lim Chang-yong and manager Kim Eung-ryong to the Samsung Lions.

Lee Jong-beom returned from Japan, and rookies Hong Se-wan, catcher Kim Sang-hoon and pitcher Kim Jin-woo joined between 2001 and 2002 to lead the team to the playoffs for three straight years from 2002 to 2004. But each time they were beaten, by the LG Twins, the SK Wyverns, and the Doosan Bears respectively.

Kia Tigers lost 76 games to end up in eighth place in 2005. Manager Yoo Nam-ho was fired and Seo Jung-hwan took charge but again ended up in last place in 2007 despite his effort and joining of former MLB player Hee-seop Choi.

Batting coach Jo Beom-hyun was promoted to the new manager position in June 2007. Former MLB pitcher Seo Jae-weong joined the team the next year in 2008, but because of a weak lineup, unstable defense and bullpen problems, the Tigers finished the pennant race in sixth place.

The 2009 season featured a rough start for the Tigers, and it looked as if the strong starting rotation of Rick Guttormson, Aquilino López, Yoon Suk-min, and Yang Hyeon-jong would get little support from the team's offense. But with Lee Jong-beom's leadership, Choi Hee-seop's revival from his three-year-long slump, and Kim Sang-hyeon's hitting, the Tigers won the pennant with the second-lowest team ERA in the league (3.92) and a win percentage of 0.609.

The Tigers won the 2009 KBO season and 2009 Korean Series, which was the first "double- victory" (having the best record in the regular season and then winning the Korea Series) by a team in the KBO since 1997. Twenty-four-year-old Outfielder Na Ji-Wan was named the series MVP after hitting a walk-off home run in the bottom of the ninth inning in Game Seven of the series.

=== 2010s ===
On October 18, 2011, Sun Dong-yeol and Lee Soon-cheol returned to the Tigers. Sun Dong-yeol was named the new manager and Lee Sun-choel was named the new head coach of the KIA Tigers.

In Sun's first season, the Tigers finished a disappointing fifth place after making the playoffs in 2012. Struggling for most of the year, a late playoff surge saw the Tigers fall just short of their rivals, the Lotte Giants, who claimed the fourth and final postseason position. The final weeks, however, inspired a lot of confidence that 2013 would be a good year after starting pitchers Seo Jae-weong, Kim Jin-woo and Yoon Suk-min all posted complete-game wins.

Sun Dong-yeol was retained as manager of the Tigers and after a very promising pre-season, the Tigers were considered one of the favorites for the Korean Series. Their early season form was blistering, and, by early May, they sat top of the table. The batters, especially Choi Hee-seop, came alive and left-handed pitcher Yang Hyeon-jong was enjoying his best run since notching up 16 wins in 2010.

But the Tigers made a disastrous trade when they off-loaded 2009 MVP Kim Sang-hyeon to the SK Wyverns for right-handed pitcher Song Eun-beom. Song had previously pitched in the Korean Series against the Samsung Lions, but his form plummeted, and KIA went on to rue the missing power from Kim once Choi, and others, faded horribly as the season progressed. They were effectively out of the playoff hunt with over a month to go, ending the 2013 season with just 51 wins from their 128 games in eighth place out of nine teams, ahead of the Hanwha Eagles.

In 2014, the Tigers moved to their new home, the 27,000 capacity Gwangju KIA Champions Field. Sun Dong-yeol was given his third season with the club, but Lee Sun-cheol moved on. Free agents Lee Yong-kyu (Hanwha Eagles) and Yoon Suk-min (Baltimore) left the club but the Tigers brought in LG Twins' center-fielder Lee Dae-hyung as a free agent. Lee, born in Gwangju, was joined at his hometown club by Kim Byung-hyun, a two-time World Series champion. Their three foreign players were starting pitcher D.J. Houlton, closer Jairo Asencio and first baseman Brett Pill. Houlton was replaced midway through the season by Justin Thomas.

Despite posting some solid batting numbers, the Tigers finished eighth in the standings, one place above the Hanwha Eagles, with a .422 winning percentage from their 128 games (54 wins, 74 losses). Yang Hyeon-jong finished the 2014 season with 16 wins, his best figures since 2010. First baseman Pill hit 19 home runs for the season, the same number as Na Ji-wan and Lee Beom-ho. Infielder An Chi-hong struck a career-best 18 home runs and a .339 batting average.

The Tigers controversially re-signed manager Sun to a new two-year deal with an annual salary of 380 million won (US$359,500) and a 300 million won signing bonus just days after the regular season ended. Irate fans swamped the club's website demanding the 51-year-old tear up his new contract. Six days later, on October 25, Sun announced that he was stepping down as Tigers manager.

On October 28, 2014, the club announced that Kim Ki-tae, born in Gwangju, would be their new manager, having signed a three-year deal. In 2013, Kim led the LG Twins to their first post-season in eleven years but quit just a month into the new season. As a player, Kim led the League in home runs (1994) and won the batting title in 1997. After retiring, Kim was voted the league's best-ever designated hitter.

In 2017, the club, as the regular-season champions, automatically advanced to the 2017 Korean Series. They played the winner of the playoff series, the Doosan Bears, who defeated the NC Dinos in the playoff. Kia won the best-of-seven series, 4–1. Yang Hyeon-jong was named the series' most valuable player.

Shortly after the 2019 season, the Tigers named former San Francisco Giants star Matt Williams as their first American manager.

== Team identity, politics and rivalry with Samsung Lions ==
The Kia Tigers, established in 1982, are closely tied to the city of Gwangju and the Honam region. The club emerged shortly after the 1980 Gwangju Uprising, which saw a violent military crackdown on pro-democracy protestors. In the years that followed, the Tigers became a prominent symbol of local pride and community identity within Honam, with their early success in the Korea Baseball Organisation coinciding with a period of national political transformation. The team's rivalry with the Samsung Lions of Daegu has often been viewed through the lens of Korea's regional and political divisions. The Tigers represent the liberal Honam region, while the Lions are based in the conservative Yeongnam region and backed by the Samsung conglomerate. During the 1980s and 1990s, matches between the two sides were marked by intense fan engagement and occasionally unrest, reflecting broader social and political undercurrents. For example, in 1986, the Korean Series between the Haitai Tigers and Samsung Lions was marred by serious fan unrest. A Tigers fan struck Lions pitcher Jin Dong-han with a thrown soju bottle in Game 1, and following later games in Daegu, Lions fans rioted, throwing bottles onto the field and burning the Tigers' team bus. Police used tear gas to disperse crowds on multiple occasions. In 1987, the two teams met again amid heightened political tension linked to South Korea's democratic transition. While no violence occurred, the memories of the 1986 riots and the upcoming presidential election added symbolic weight to the series, which the Tigers won in a four-game sweep. That year, following nationwide pro-democracy protests, presidential candidate Roh Tae-woo announced the June 29 Declaration, agreeing to implement direct presidential elections. This development marked a key step in South Korea's political liberalisation. Roh, a former general from Daegu in the Yeongnam region, was set to face Kim Dae-jung, a long-standing opposition figure from South Jeolla Province in the Honam region.

Up until 1999, the Tigers were prohibited from hosting home games on May 18, the anniversary of the 1980 Gwangju Uprising, as authorities were concerned that such an event might trigger renewed protests.

== Season-by-season records ==
Season	Stadium	League	Finish	Regular season									Postseason	Awards
Season	Stadium	League	Finish	Rank	Games	Wins	Losses	Draws	Win%	BA	HR	ERA	Postseason	Awards
Haitai Tigers
1982	Gwangju Mudeung; Baseball Stadium	KBO	4/6	4/6	40	20	20	0	.500	.261	84	3.79	Did not qualify	
1982	Gwangju Mudeung; Baseball Stadium	KBO	4/6	4/6	40	18	22	0	.450	.261	84	3.79	Did not qualify	
1983	Gwangju Mudeung; Baseball Stadium	KBO	1/6	1/6	50	30	19	1	.612	.268	78	3.17	Won Korean Series vs. MBC Chungyong (4–1–0)	
1983	Gwangju Mudeung; Baseball Stadium	KBO	1/6	4/6	50	25	25	0	.500	.268	78	3.17	Won Korean Series vs. MBC Chungyong (4–1–0)	
1984	Gwangju Mudeung; Baseball Stadium	KBO	5/6	5/6	50	19	29	2	.396	.248	76	3.16	Did not qualify	
1984	Gwangju Mudeung; Baseball Stadium	KBO	5/6	3/6	50	24	25	1	.490	.248	76	3.16	Did not qualify	
1985	Gwangju Mudeung; Baseball Stadium	KBO	3/6	3/6	55	29	26	0	.527	.272	99	3.64	Did not qualify	Kim Seong-han (MVP); Lee Sun-cheol (ROTY)
1985	Gwangju Mudeung; Baseball Stadium	KBO	3/6	3/6	55	28	26	1	.519	.272	99	3.64	Did not qualify	Kim Seong-han (MVP); Lee Sun-cheol (ROTY)
1986	Gwangju Mudeung; Baseball Stadium	KBO	1/7	2/7	54	34	18	2	.654	.259	99	2.86	Won Korean Series vs. Samsung Lions (4–1)	Sun Dong-yol (MVP)
1986	Gwangju Mudeung; Baseball Stadium	KBO	1/7	2/7	54	33	19	2	.635	.259	99	2.86	Won Korean Series vs. Samsung Lions (4–1)	Sun Dong-yol (MVP)
1987	Gwangju Mudeung; Baseball Stadium	KBO	1/7	3/7	54	27	25	2	.519	.252	71	3.16	Won playoff vs. OB Bears (3–2); Won Korean Series vs. Samsung Lions (4–0)	
1987	Gwangju Mudeung; Baseball Stadium	KBO	1/7	2/7	54	28	23	3	.549	.252	71	3.16	Won playoff vs. OB Bears (3–2); Won Korean Series vs. Samsung Lions (4–0)	
1988	Gwangju Mudeung; Baseball Stadium	KBO	1/7	1/7	54	34	19	1	.639	.283	112	2.86	Won Korean Series vs. Binggrae Eagles (4–2)	Kim Seong-han (MVP)
1988	Gwangju Mudeung; Baseball Stadium	KBO	1/7	1/7	54	34	19	1	.639	.283	112	2.86	Won Korean Series vs. Binggrae Eagles (4–2)	Kim Seong-han (MVP)
1989	Gwangju Mudeung; Baseball Stadium	KBO	1/7	2/7	120	65	51	4	.558	.255	90	3.34	Won playoff vs. Pacific Dolphins (3–0); Won Korean Series vs. Binggrae Eagles (4–1)	Sun Dong-yol (MVP)
1990	Gwangju Mudeung; Baseball Stadium	KBO	3/7	2/7	120	68	49	3	.579	.270	87	3.36	Lost playoff vs. Samsung Lions (0–3)	Sun Dong-yol (MVP)
1991	Gwangju Mudeung; Baseball Stadium	KBO	1/8	1/8	126	79	42	5	.647	.259	144	2.89	Won Korean Series vs. Binggrae Eagles (4–0)	
1992	Gwangju Mudeung; Baseball Stadium	KBO	3/8	2/8	126	71	54	1	.567	.272	138	4.21	Lost playoff vs. Lotte Giants (2–3)	
1993	Gwangju Mudeung; Baseball Stadium	KBO	1/8	1/8	126	81	42	3	.659	.251	95	2.92	Won Korean Series vs. Samsung Lions (4–1–2)	
1994	Gwangju Mudeung; Baseball Stadium	KBO	4/8	4/8	126	65	59	2	.524	.271	93	3.60	Lost semi-playoff vs. Hanwha Eagles (0–2)	Lee Jong-beom (MVP)
1995	Gwangju Mudeung; Baseball Stadium	KBO	4/8		126	64	58	4	.524	.242	75	3.06	Did not qualify	
1996	Gwangju Mudeung; Baseball Stadium	KBO	1/8	1/8	126	73	51	2	.587	.245	92	3.14	Won Korean Series vs. Hyundai Unicorns (4–2)	
1997	Gwangju Mudeung; Baseball Stadium	KBO	1/8	1/8	126	75	50	1	.599	.258	133	3.65	Won Korean Series vs. LG Twins (4–1)	
1998	Gwangju Mudeung; Baseball Stadium	KBO	5/8		126	61	64	1	.488	.258	94	3.91	Did not qualify	
1999	Gwangju Mudeung; Baseball Stadium	Dream League	7/8	4/4	132	60	69	3	.465	.278	210	5.21	Did not qualify	
2000	Gwangju Mudeung; Baseball Stadium	Dream League	6/8	4/4	133	57	72	4	.442	.252	86	4.95	Did not qualify	
2001	Gwangju Mudeung; Baseball Stadium	KBO	5/8		133	60	68	5	.469	.278	142	5.01	Did not qualify	
Kia Tigers
2002	Gwangju Mudeung; Baseball Stadium	KBO	3/8	2/8	133	78	51	4	.605	.269	120	3.92	Lost playoff vs. LG Twins (2–3)	
2003	Gwangju Mudeung; Baseball Stadium	KBO	3/8	2/8	133	78	50	5	.609	.272	129	3.62	Lost playoff vs. SK Wyverns (0–3)	
2004	Gwangju Mudeung; Baseball Stadium	KBO	4/8	4/8	133	67	61	5	.523	.267	143	4.51	Lost semi-playoff vs. Doosan Bears (0–2)	
2005	Gwangju Mudeung; Baseball Stadium	KBO	8/8		126	49	76	1	.392	.260	99	4.81	Did not qualify	
2006	Gwangju Mudeung; Baseball Stadium	KBO	4/8	4/8	126	64	59	3	.520	.255	62	3.33	Lost semi-playoff vs. Hanwha Eagles (1–2)	
2007	Gwangju Mudeung; Baseball Stadium	KBO	8/8		126	51	74	1	.408	.257	73	4.49	Did not qualify	
2008	Gwangju Mudeung; Baseball Stadium	KBO	6/8		126	57	69	0	.452	.260	48	4.08	Did not qualify	
2009	Gwangju Mudeung; Baseball Stadium	KBO	1/8	1/8	133	81	48	4	.609	.267	156	3.92	Won Korean Series vs. SK Wyverns (4–3)	Kim Sang-hyeon (MVP)
2010	Gwangju Mudeung; Baseball Stadium	KBO	5/8		133	59	74	0	.444	.260	106	4.39	Did not qualify	
2011	Gwangju Mudeung; Baseball Stadium	KBO	4/8	4/8	133	70	63	0	.526	.269	106	4.10	Lost semi-playoff vs. SK Wyverns (1–3)	Yoon Suk-min (MVP)
2012	Gwangju Mudeung; Baseball Stadium	KBO	5/8		133	62	65	6	.488	.256	54	3.90	Did not qualify	
2013	Gwangju Mudeung; Baseball Stadium	KBO	8/9		128	51	74	3	.408	.261	88	5.12	Did not qualify	
2014	Gwangju-Kia; Champions Field	KBO	8/9		128	54	74	0	.422	.288	121	5.82	Did not qualify	
2015	Gwangju-Kia; Champions Field	KBO	7/10		144	67	77	0	.465	.251	136	4.79	Did not qualify	
2016	Gwangju-Kia; Champions Field	KBO	5/10	5/10	144	70	73	1	.490	.286	170	4.97	Lost wild card vs. LG Twins (1–1)	
2017	Gwangju-Kia; Champions Field	KBO	1/10	1/10	144	87	56	1	.608	.302	170	4.79	Won Korean Series vs. Doosan Bears (4–1)	Yang Hyeon-jong (MVP)
2018	Gwangju-Kia; Champions Field	KBO	5/10	5/10	144	70	74	0	.486	.295	170	5.40	Lost wild card vs. Nexen Heroes (0–1)	
2019	Gwangju-Kia; Champions Field	KBO	7/10		144	62	80	2	.437	.264	76	4.65	Did not qualify	
2020	Gwangju-Kia; Champions Field	KBO	6/10		144	73	71	0	.507	.274	130	5.13	Did not qualify	
2021	Gwangju-Kia; Champions Field	KBO	9/10		144	58	76	10	.433	.248	66	4.89	Did not qualify	Lee Eui-lee (ROTY)
2022	Gwangju-Kia; Champions Field	KBO	5/10	5/10	144	70	73	1	.490	.272	113	4.20	Lost wild card vs. KT Wiz (0–1)	
2023	Gwangju-Kia; Champions Field	KBO	6/10		144	73	69	2	.514	.276	101	4.13	Did not qualify	
2024	Gwangju-Kia; Champions Field	KBO	1/10	1/10	144	87	55	2	.613	.301	163	4.40	Won Korean Series vs. Samsung Lions (4–1)	Kim Do-yeong (MVP)
2025	Gwangju-Kia; Champions Field	KBO	8/10		144	65	75	4	.464	.258	144	4.66	Did not qualify	
2026	Gwangju-Kia; Champions Field	KBO	3/10	3/10	144	79	63	2	.556	.271	174	4.27	Won semi-playoff vs. LG Twins (3–0); Lost playoff vs. Samsung Lions (2–3)	

== Team ==
=== Managers ===
- Kim Dong-yeob (1982)
- Cho Chang-soo (1982) (caretaker)
- Kim Eung-ryong (1983–2000)
- Kim Seong-han (2000–2004)
- Yoo Nam-ho (2004–2005)
- Seo Jeong-hwan (2005–2007)
- Cho Beom-hyeon (2007–2011)
- Sun Dong-yol (2011–2014)
- Kim Ki-tai (2014–2019)
- Park Heung-sik (2019) (caretaker)
- Matt Williams (2020–2021)
- Kim Jong-kook (2022–2023)
- Lee Bum-ho (2024–present)

=== Retired numbers ===
Lee Jong-beom; SS, RF	Sun Dong-yol; P

== See also ==
- Pikki Pikki dance
