= Chung Soon-yeong =

South Korean mathematician (born 1959)

PhD Chung Soon-yeong
- 정순영
- Born: February 21, 1959; Gokseong, South Jeolla Province
- Citizenship: South Korean
- Education: Ph.D.
- Alma mater: Seoul National University, Yushin High School
- Scientific career
- Fields: Partial differential equations, functional analysis
- Institutions: Sogang University, National Institute for Mathematical Sciences, Korean Mathematical Society, Duksung Women's University

Korean name
- Hangul: 정순영
- Hanja: 鄭淳泳
- RR: Jeong Sunyeong
- MR: Chŏng Sunyŏng

Chung Soon-yeong (Korean: 정순영; born February 21, 1959) is a mathematics professor in the Department of Mathematics and Convergence Biomedical Engineering at Sogang University. He was the fifth president of the National Institute for Mathematical Sciences and a vice president of the Korean Mathematical Society.

== Education ==
Chung went to Yushin High School, a private high school in Suwon, entering in 1974. He focused on natural science. Entering Seoul National University in 1978, he majored in mathematics with an emphasis on partial differential equations for his PhD.

== Career ==
After graduation, he was an assistant professor at Duksung Women's University followed by an associate professor and then full professor at Sogang University. From 2000, he held other positions at Sogang, including head of the Department of Mathematics, director of the Research Institute for Basic Science, dean of academic affairs, director of the Teaching and Learning Center, dean of the College of Natural Science.

His service to the Korean Mathematical Society included director of the 42nd Math Olympiad, organizer, editing executive director, and vice president. For a two-year term starting in 2007, he headed the Mathematical Sciences Division at the National Research Foundation of Korea.

He became the fifth president of the National Institute for Mathematical Sciences from January 30, 2018, to January 29, 2021.

== Honors and awards ==
- 2019: Outstanding Researcher in Science and Engineering, Ministry of Education
- 2013: Best Lecturer of the School of Natural Sciences, Sogang University
- 2010: Fellow, Korean Academy of Science and Technology
- 2010: Achievement Award, Korean Mathematical Society
- 2009: Alumni Award, Yushin High School
- 2008: Public Relations Achievement Award, National Research Foundation of Korea
- 2005: Outstanding Instructor Award, Graduate School of Education, Sogang University
- 2002: LG Yonam Overseas Professor
- 2001–2017: Professor with Outstanding Research Achievement, Sogang University

== Selected publications ==
- Chung, Jaeyoung; Chung, Soon-Yeong; Kim, Dohan (July 1996). "Characterizations of the Gelfand-Shilov spaces via Fourier transforms". Proceedings of the American Mathematical Society. 124 (7): 2101–2108. doi:10.1090/S0002-9939-96-03291-1.
- Chung, Soon-Yeong; Berenstein, Carlos A. (2005). "ω -harmonic functions and inverse conductivity problems on networks". SIAM Journal on Applied Mathematics. 65 (4): 1200–1226. doi:10.1137/S0036139903432743.
- Chung, Jaeyoung; Chung, Soon-Yeong; Kim, Dohan (1994). "A Characterization for Fourier Hyperfunctions". Publications of the Research Institute for Mathematical Sciences. 30 (2): 203–208. doi:10.2977/PRIMS/1195166129.
- Kim, Kwang Whoi; Chung, Soon-Yeong; Kim, Dohan (1993). "Fourier Hyperfunctions as the Boundary Values of Smooth Solutions of Heat Equations". Publications of the Research Institute for Mathematical Sciences. 29 (2): 289–300. doi:10.2977/PRIMS/1195167274.
