= Choi Yun Sung =

South Korean mathematician (born 1958)

- 최윤성
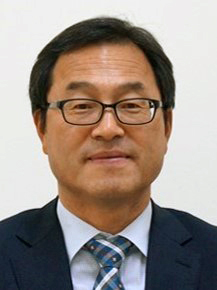
- Born: December 11, 1958
- Education: Ph.D.
- Alma mater: University of Rochester, Seoul National University
- Scientific career
- Fields: Functional analysis, infinite dimensional function theory
- Institutions: Pohang University of Science and Technology, National Institute for Mathematical Sciences
- Thesis: Spaces of Holomorphic Functions (1986)
- Doctoral advisor: Leopoldo Nachbin

Korean name
- Hangul: 최윤성
- Hanja: 崔允誠
- RR: Choe Yunseong
- MR: Ch'oe Yunsŏng
- Website: Homepage

Choi Yun Sung (Korean: 최윤성; born 1958) is an emeritus professor in the Department of Mathematics at Pohang University of Science and Technology. He became president of the National Institute for Mathematical Sciences in 2025.

== Education ==
Choi graduated from Kyungnam High School in 1976. Majoring in mathematics, he completed his undergrad at Seoul National University. With Leopoldo Nachbin as his academic advisor, Choi focused on functional analysis, receiving a M.A. and Ph.D. from the University of Rochester in 1984 and 1986, respectively.

== Career ==
After completing his doctorate, he taught at Pusan National University for two years before going to Pohang University of Science and Technology (POSTECH) where he taught for at least 35 years. In additional to his role as professor, he was also head of the Department of Mathematics and director of the POSTECH Mathematics Institute. He has organized and held the ILJU School of Mathematics-Banach Spaces and Related Topics annually since 2009.

Choi has been a chief editor of the Journal of Korean Mathematical Society and an editor of Communications of the Korean Mathematical Society.

In 2025, Choi became president of National Institute for Mathematical Sciences.

== Awards and honors ==
- 2023: Education Award, Korean Mathematical Society
- 2015: Academic Award, Korean Mathematical Society

== Selected publications ==
1. Choi, Yun Sung; Kim, Sung Guen (1 August 1996). "Norm or numerical radius attaining multilinear mappings and polynomials". Journal of the London Mathematical Society. 54 (1): 135–147. doi:10.1112/jlms/54.1.135.
2. Choi, Yun Sung; Kim, Sun Kwang (September 2011). "The Bishop-Phelps-Bollobás theorem for operators from $L_{1}(\mu)$ to Banach spaces with the Radon-Nikodým property". Journal of Functional Analysis. 261 (6): 1446–1456. doi:10.1016/j.jfa.2011.05.007.
3. Aron, Richard; Choi, Yun Sung; García, Domingo; Maestre, Manuel (10 September 2011). "The Bishop-Phelps-Bollobás theorem for $L(L_{1}(\mu), (L$_{∞}[0, 1])". Advances in Mathematics. 228 (1): 617–628. doi:10.1016/j.aim.2011.05.023.

== See also ==
- Kim Hyun-Min
