= Hyun-min =

- Hangul: 현민
- RR: Hyeonmin
- MR: Hyŏnmin

Hyun-min (Korean: 현민) is a Korean given name. Notable people with the name include:

- Ahn Hyun-min (born 2003), South Korean baseball player
- Han Hyun-min (born 2001), South Korean model and actor
- Kim Hyun-Min (born 1966), South Korean mathematician and professor
- Oh Hyun-min (born 1995), South Korean television personality
- Park Hyun-min (born 1986), South Korean picture author and illustrator
- Yoon Hyun-min (born 1985), South Korean actor, former baseball player
