= Institute of Mathematics and Applications =

Institute of Mathematics and Applications may refer to:

- Institute for Mathematics and its Applications, Minneapolis, US
- Institute of Mathematics and Applications, Bhubaneswar, India
- Institute of Mathematics and its Applications, London, UK

== See also ==
- Institute of Mathematics (disambiguation)
