= Hyung Ju Park =

South Korean mathematician (born 1964)

President of Ajou University, South Korea
- Incumbent
- Assumed office 2019

Personal details
- Born: 1964 (age 61–62) South Korea
- Education: Seoul National University, South Korea; UC Berkeley, USA
- Profession: University President
- Website: https://www.ajou.ac.kr/en/intro/profile.do
- Scientific career
- Education: Seoul National University, UC Berkeley, USA
- Fields: Mathematics
- Workplaces: Korean Institute for Advanced Study, POSTECH, Ajou University, National Institute for Mathematical Sciences
- Thesis: (1995)

Hyung Ju Park (Korean: 박형주; born 1964) is a mathematician and former president of Ajou University in South Korea.

== Early life ==
Born in Buyeo, South Korea, Park studied physics at Seoul National University and received his undergraduate degree in 1986. He then received a Ph.D. degree in mathematics at University of California, Berkeley, USA in 1995.

== Career ==
From 1995 to 2004, Park was with the Department of Mathematics at Oakland University, California, USA as a professor. From 2004 to 2009, he was professor at School of Computational Sciences, Korean Institute for Advanced Study. Park was a member of the executive committee of the Korean Mathematical Society from 2005 to 2006. From 2009 to 2015, he was professor at School of Mathematics, POSTECH. He was President of the National Institute for Mathematical Sciences from 2015 to 2017. From 2015 to 2018, he was a chair professor at Ajou University. In 2018, he became the 16th president of Ajou University.
