= He Xiantu =

Chinese physicist

He Xiantu (simplified Chinese: 贺贤土; traditional Chinese: 賀賢土; born September 28, 1937), also romanized as Xian-Tu He, is a Chinese nuclear and theoretical physicist. He is the chief scientist of many Chinese national nuclear research and development programs. He designed the first neutron bomb in China.

== Career ==
Born in Zhenhai, Ningbo, Zhejiang Province, he studied mathematics and physics, and graduated from the Department of Physics, Zhejiang University in 1962.

He served for a long time in the physical institutes of the Chinese Academy of Engineering and Physics, and he is the former deputy director of the Institute of Applied Physics and Computational Mathematics (IAPCM), Beijing. He currently is the chief scientist of National 863 Program Hi-Tech Inertial Confinement Fusion (ICF) Project and the chief scientist of IAPCM. He also holds the professorship and the dean position of the College of Science, Zhejiang University. He became an academician of the Chinese Academy of Sciences in 1995's election.

He is a member of the Expert Committee of Nonlinear Science, Major State Basic Research. He made great contributions to the development of nuclear weapons in China. He has been long working on inertial confinement fusion ICF model, nonequilibrium statistical physics, and nonlinear plasma physics.

== Awards and honors ==
Asteroid 79286 Hexiantu was named in his honor. The official naming citation was published by the Minor Planet Center on 25 September 2018 (M.P.C. 111800). In July 2019, he was awarded the Edward Teller Medal of the American Nuclear Society "for his outstanding leadership in the development of inertial confinement fusion (ICF) study and his significant contribution to target physics and high energy density physics".
