= Institute of Mathematics =

This is a list of Institutes of Mathematics or Mathematical Institutes.

== Americas ==
=== United States ===
- American Institute of Mathematics
- Clay Mathematics Institute, Cambridge, Massachusetts
- Courant Institute of Mathematical Sciences, at New York University
- Institute for Advanced Study, in Princeton, New Jersey
- Institute for Mathematics and its Applications, at the University of Minnesota
- Institute for Pure and Applied Mathematics, at the University of California, Los Angeles
- Mathematical Sciences Research Institute, at the University of California, Berkeley

=== Canada ===
- Pacific Institute for the Mathematical Sciences, at the University of British Columbia
- Centre de Recherches Mathématiques, at the Université de Montréal
- Fields Institute, at the University of Toronto

=== Latin America ===
- Center for Mathematical Modeling, at the University of Chile
- Centro de Investigación en Matemáticas, Guanajuato, Guanajuato in Mexico
- National Institute for Pure and Applied Mathematics, Rio de Janeiro, Brazil
- PPGMAp, at the Universidade Federal do Rio Grande do Sul, Brazil

== Europe ==
- Brunel Institute of Computational Mathematics, in Uxbridge, UK
- Institut de mathématiques de Jussieu – Paris Rive Gauche in Paris, France
- Central Economic Mathematical Institute, at the Russian Academy of Sciences
- Centre de Recerca Matemàtica, at the Autonomous University of Barcelona
- Centre International de Rencontres Mathématiques, in Marseille, France
- Centrum Wiskunde & Informatica, at Science Park, Amsterdam
- CoMPLEX, at University College London
- Fachinformationszentrum Karlsruhe, Germany
- Hamilton Mathematics Institute, at Trinity College, Dublin, Ireland
- Hausdorff Center for Mathematics, Bonn, Germany
- Institut de Mathématiques de Toulouse, France
- Institute for Experimental Mathematics, at the University of Duisburg-Essen in Germany
- Institute of Mathematics (National Academy of Sciences of Belarus)
- Institute of Mathematics of the National Academy of Sciences of Ukraine
- Institute of Mathematics and its Applications, a UK society
- The Institute of Mathematics and Computer Science, University of Latvia
- Institute of Mathematics and Informatics (Bulgarian Academy of Sciences)
- Institute of Mathematics of National Academy of Sciences of Armenia
- Institute of Mathematics of the Romanian Academy at Bucharest
- Institute of Mathematics, Physics, and Mechanics in Slovenia
- Institut des Hautes Études Scientifiques, near Paris, France
- Institut Henri Poincaré, Paris, France
- International Centre for Mathematical Sciences, at Edinburgh
- Isaac Newton Institute, at the University of Cambridge
- János Bolyai Mathematical Institute, at the University of Szeged in Hungary
- Keldysh Institute of Applied Mathematics, at the Russian Academy of Sciences
- The Mathematical Institute, University of Oxford
- Max Planck Institute for Mathematics, Bonn, Germany
- Max Planck Institute for Mathematics in the Sciences at Leipzig
- Mittag-Leffler Institute, Stockholm. Sweden
- Moscow State Institute of Electronics and Mathematics
- Oberwolfach Research Institute for Mathematics, Oberwolfach, Germany
- Steklov Institute of Mathematics, Moscow, Russia
- University of Copenhagen Institute for Mathematical Sciences

== Asia ==
- Chennai Mathematical Institute, India
- CR Rao Advanced Institute of Mathematics, Statistics and Computer Science, at the University of Hyderabad in India
- Einstein Institute of Mathematics, Jerusalem
- Harish-Chandra Research Institute, Allahabad, India
- Indian Statistical Institute, Kolkata in India
- Institute for Studies in Theoretical Physics and Mathematics, Tehran, Iran
- Institute of Applied Physics and Computational Mathematics, Beijing
- Institute of Mathematical Sciences, Chennai, India
- Institute of Mathematics and Applications, Bhubaneswar, India
- National Institute for Mathematical Sciences, Korea
- Korea Institute for Advanced Study, Korea
- Research Institute for Mathematical Sciences, at Kyoto University, Japan
- Institute of Statistical Mathematics in Tokyo, Japan
- TIFR Centre for Applicable Mathematics, India
- Institute for Mathematics for Industry, at Kyushu University in Fukuoka, Japan
- Meiji Institute for Advanced Study of Mathematical Sciences, at Meiji University in Tokyo, Japan
- Osaka Central Advanced Mathematical Institute, at Osaka Metropolitan University in Osaka, Japan

== Australia ==
- Australian Mathematical Sciences Institute at the University of Melbourne

== Africa ==
- African Institute for Mathematical Sciences, Muizenberg, South Africa

== Statistical mathematics ==
- Institute of Mathematical Statistics, United States
- Institute of Statistical Mathematics, Japan

== See also ==
- Search for pages containing Institute and Mathematics
- Institute of Mathematics and Applications (disambiguation)
