= 2017 U-18 Baseball World Cup =

Tournament details
- Country: Canada
- Dates: September 1–10
- Teams: 12
- Defending champions: United States

Final positions
- Champions: United States (9th title)
- Runners-up: South Korea
- Third place: Japan
- Fourth place: Canada

Tournament statistics
- Games played: 50
- Best BA: (Cuba) César Prieto (.581)
- Most HRs: (United States) Triston Casas (3)
- Most SBs: (United States) Michael Siani (7)
- Most Ks (as pitcher): (Japan) Fumimaru Taura (29)

Awards
- MVP: (United States) Triston Casas

The 2017 U-18 Baseball World Cup or the XXVIII U-18 Baseball World Cup was an international baseball tournament held by the World Baseball Softball Confederation for players 18-year-old and younger. The 2017 edition was held in Thunder Bay, Ontario, from September 1–10, 2017.

== Format ==
First round: The twelve participating nations were drawn into two groups of 6, in which single round robin will occur. The top 3 nations from each group advances to the Super Round, while the bottom 3 nations from each group advance to the consolation round.

Consolation round: The 6 nations in this round play one game against the teams they have not played yet. (example: The 4th placed team from Group A will play the bottom three teams from Group B)

Super round: The format in the Super Round is similar to that of the consolation round. Each team plays the top three teams from the opposing group. (example: The 1st placed team from Group B will play the top three teams from Group A) The standings for this round will include the 2 games played against the 2 other Second Round qualifiers from the team's First Round group, and the 3 games played in the second round, for a total of 5 games. The 3rd and 4th-place finishers advance to the Bronze Medal Game, and the 1st and 2nd-place finishers advance to the Gold Medal Game.

Finals: The Finals consist of the Bronze Medal Game, contested by the 3rd and 4th-place finishers, and the Gold Medal Game, contested by the 1st and 2nd-place finishers.

== Teams ==
The following 12 teams qualified for the tournament. The number shown in parentheses is the country's position in the WBSC World Rankings going into the competition.

Pool A	Pool B
South Korea (3)	Japan (1)
Chinese Taipei ^{1} (4)	United States (2)
Australia (8)	Cuba (5)
Canada (10)	Mexico (6)
Italy (12)	Netherlands (9)
Nicaragua (15)	South Africa (29)

^1 Chinese Taipei is the official WBSC designation for the team representing the state officially referred to as the Republic of China, more commonly known as Taiwan. (See also political status of Taiwan for details.)

== First round ==
=== Group A ===
Pos	Team	Pld	W	L	RF	RA	PCT	GB	Qualification
1	South Korea	5	5	0	45	15	1.000	—	Advance to super round
2	Canada (H)	5	3	2	42	28	.600 (Note: Three-way tie decided by TQB)	2	Advance to super round
3	Australia	5	3	2	33	19	.600	2	Advance to super round
4	Chinese Taipei	5	3	2	28	24	.600	2	Advance to consolation round
5	Italy	5	1	4	12	42	.200	4	Advance to consolation round
6	Nicaragua	5	0	5	20	52	.000	5	Advance to consolation round

Source: WBSC
(H) Hosts
Notes:

Date	Local time	Road team	Score	Home team	Inn.	Venue	Game duration	Attendance	Boxscore
Sep 1, 2017	9:30	Italy	4–2	Nicaragua		Baseball Central	2:26	650	Boxscore
Sep 1, 2017	13:00	Australia	1–4	South Korea		Port Arthur Stadium	2:36	450	Boxscore
Sep 1, 2017	18:30	Chinese Taipei	7–6	Canada	F/10	Port Arthur Stadium	3:56	3,278	Boxscore
Sep 2, 2017	9:00	South Korea	8–2	Chinese Taipei		Port Arthur Stadium	3:06	600	Boxscore
Sep 2, 2017	9:30	Italy	1–15	Australia	F/6	Baseball Central	2 :19	200	Boxscore
Sep 3, 2017	9:00	Chinese Taipei	9–1	Italy		Port Arthur Stadium	3:20	658	Boxscore
Sep 3, 2017	9:30	Nicaragua	6–11	Australia		Baseball Central	3:03	200	Boxscore
Sep 3, 2017	13:00	South Korea	11–7	Canada		Port Arthur Stadium	3:36	2,350	Boxscore
Sep 4, 2017	9:30	Nicaragua	4–12	South Korea		Port Arthur Stadium	2:30	347	Boxscore
Sep 4, 2017	9:30	Australia	4–0	Chinese Taipei		Baseball Central	2:36	148	Boxscore
Sep 4, 2017	18:30	Canada	6–5	Italy		Port Arthur Stadium	3:46	3,487	Boxscore
Sep 5, 2017	14:00	Nicaragua	5–10	Chinese Taipei		Port Arthur Stadium	3:07	186	Boxscore
Sep 5, 2017	14:00	Italy	1–10	South Korea		Baseball Central	2:58	511	Boxscore
Sep 5, 2017	18:30	Australia	2–8	Canada		Port Arthur Stadium	2:57	3,147	Boxscore
Sep 6, 2017	17:00	Canada	15–3	Nicaragua	F/7	Port Arthur Stadium	2:24	2,484	Boxscore

=== Group B ===
Pos	Team	Pld	W	L	RF	RA	PCT	GB	Qualification
1	United States	5	5	0	34	2	1.000	—	Advance to super round
2	Japan	5	4	1	32	8	.800	1	Advance to super round
3	Cuba	5	3	2	26	18	.600	2	Advance to super round
4	Netherlands	5	2	3	28	20	.400	3	Advance to consolation round
5	Mexico	5	1	4	16	26	.200	4	Advance to consolation round
6	South Africa	5	0	5	6	68	.000	5	Advance to consolation round

Source: WBSC

Date	Local time	Road team	Score	Home team	Inn.	Venue	Game duration	Attendance	Boxscore
Sep 1, 2017	9:30	Japan	10–1	Mexico		Port Arthur Stadium	2:59	500	Boxscore
Sep 1, 2017	13:00	Netherlands	1–11	United States	F/8	Baseball Central	2:28	600	Boxscore
Sep 1, 2017	19:00	South Africa	2–15	Cuba	F/7	Baseball Central	2:19	100	Boxscore
Sep 2, 2017	14:00	Netherlands	0–3	Cuba		Baseball Central	2:24	200	Boxscore
Sep 2, 2017	17:00	United States	4–0	Japan		Port Arthur Stadium	3:13	1,600	Boxscore
Sep 3, 2017	14:00	South Africa	3–22	Netherlands	F/5	Baseball Central	1:54	250	Boxscore
Sep 3, 2017	17:00	Cuba	2–7	Japan		Port Arthur Stadium	3:17	1,111	Boxscore
Sep 3, 2017	18:30	Mexico	0–6	United States	F/6	Baseball Central	3:08	450	Boxscore
Sep 4, 2017	14:00	Japan	3–1	Netherlands		Port Arthur Stadium	2:38	1,047	Boxscore
Sep 4, 2017	14:00	United States	5–0	South Africa		Baseball Central	2:10	904	Boxscore
Sep 4, 2017	18:30	Mexico	1–5	Cuba		Baseball Central	2:42	1,000	Boxscore
Sep 5, 2017	9:30	South Africa	0–12	Japan	F/7	Port Arthur Stadium	2:33	222	Boxscore
Sep 5, 2017	9:30	Netherlands	4–0	Mexico		Baseball Central	2:13	420	Boxscore
Sep 5, 2017	18:30	Cuba	1–8	United States		Baseball Central	2:28	1,217	Boxscore
Sep 6, 2017	13:00	Mexico	14–1	South Africa	F/7	Port Arthur Stadium	2:26	149	Boxscore

== Super round ==
Pos	Team	Pld	W	L	RF	RA	PCT	GB	Qualification
1	United States	5	5	0	31	4	1.000	—	Advance to final
2	South Korea	5	4	1	38	21	.800	1	Advance to final
3	Canada (H)	5	3	2	28	27	.600	2	Advance to third-place game
4	Japan	5	2	3	19	21	.400	3	Advance to third-place game
5	Australia	5	1	4	9	25	.200	4	
6	Cuba	5	0	5	12	39	.000	5	

Source: WBSC
(H) Hosts

Date	Local time	Road team	Score	Home team	Inn.	Venue	Game duration	Attendance	Boxscore
Sep 7, 2017	9:30	Australia	3–4	Japan	F/11	Port Arthur Stadium	3:19	212	Boxscore
Sep 7, 2017	9:30	Cuba	7–17	South Korea	F/8	Baseball Central	3:23	151	Boxscore
Sep 7, 2017	18:00	Canada	3–8	United States		Port Arthur Stadium	3:05	3.107	Boxscore
Sep 8, 2017	9:00	United States	2–0	South Korea		Port Arthur Stadium	3:00	412	Boxscore
Sep 8, 2017	13:00	Australia	3–0	Cuba		Port Arthur Stadium	2:30	225	Boxscore
Sep 8, 2017	17:00	Canada	6–4	Japan		Port Arthur Stadium	3:57	3447	Boxscore
Sep 9, 2017	09:00	Australia	0–9	United States		Port Arthur Stadium	2:11	459	Boxscore
Sep 9, 2017	13:00	Japan	4–6	South Korea		Port Arthur Stadium	3:02	672	Boxscore
Sep 9, 2017	17:00	Cuba	2–4	Canada		Port Arthur Stadium	2:31	3,199	Boxscore

== Consolation round ==
Pos	Team	Pld	W	L	RF	RA	PCT	GB
1	Chinese Taipei	5	5	0	35	8	1.000	—
2	Netherlands	5	4	1	37	11	.800	1
3	Italy	5	2	3	19	20	.400 (Note: Three-way tie decided by TQB)	3
4	Nicaragua	5	2	3	31	27	.400	3
5	Mexico	5	2	3	24	28	.400	3
6	South Africa	5	0	5	7	59	.000	5

Source: WBSC
Notes:

Date	Local time	Road team	Score	Home team	Inn.	Venue	Game duration	Attendance	Boxscore
Sep 7, 2017	14:00	Mexico	1–9	Chinese Taipei		Port Arthur Stadium	3:25	147	Boxscore
Sep 7, 2017	14:00	Italy	9–2	South Africa		Baseball Central	2:50	152	Boxscore
Sep 7, 2017	18:30	Nicaragua	3–8	Netherlands		Baseball Central	3:06	147	Boxscore
Sep 8, 2017	9:30	Italy	4–5	Mexico		Baseball Central	2:48	147	Boxscore
Sep 8, 2017	14:00	South Africa	1–11	Nicaragua	F/8	Baseball Central	2:34	126	Boxscore
Sep 8, 2017	18:30	Chinese Taipei	4–1	Netherlands		Baseball Central	3:09	279	Boxscore
Sep 9, 2017	9:30	Nicaragua	10–4	Mexico		Baseball Central	3:10	147	Boxscore
Sep 9, 2017	14:00	South Africa	0–3	Chinese Taipei		Baseball Central	2:17	185	Boxscore
Sep 9, 2017	18:30	Italy	1–2	Netherlands		Baseball Central	2:28	318	Boxscore

== Finals ==
=== Third-place game ===
Date	Local time	Road team	Score	Home team	Inn.	Venue	Game duration	Attendance	Boxscore
Sep 10, 2017	12:00	Japan	8–1	Canada		Port Arthur Stadium	2:48	3,017	Boxscore

=== Championship ===
Date	Local time	Road team	Score	Home team	Inn.	Venue	Game duration	Attendance	Boxscore
Sep 10, 2017	17:00	South Korea	0–8	United States		Port Arthur Stadium	2:56	3,245	Boxscore

== Medalists ==
Event	Gold	Silver	Bronze
Tournament	United States; Will Banfield; Triston Casas; Raynel Delgado; Mason Denaburg; Brandon Dieter; J. T. Ginn; Nolan Gorman; Ethan Hankins; Jarred Kelenic; Matthew Liberatore; Landon Marceaux; Anthony Seigler; Joseph Menefee; Kumar Rocker; Michael Siani; Alek Thomas; Brice Turang; Ryan Weathers; Cole Wilcox; Carter Young	South Korea; Bae Ji-hwan; Cho Dae-hyun; Choi Jun-woo; Choi Hyun-jun; Gwak Been; Ha Jun-young; Han Dong-hui; Jang Jun-hwan; Kang Baek-ho; Kim Young-jun; Kim Min; Kim Ki-hoon; Kim Jeong-woo; Lee Yu-seok; Park Dong-soo; Seo Jun-won; Sung Dong-hyun; Yang Chang-seop; Ye Jin-won; Ye In-hyok	Japan; Kyota Fujiwara; Taisei Inoue; Shumpei Isomura; Kosuke Ito; Kento Kawabata; Kotaro Kiyomiya; Yūto Koga; Kaito Kozono; Yoshihiro Kujirai; Kazuya Maruyama; Shu Masuda; Ginji Miura; Shosei Nakamura; Kenji Nishimaki; Shuto Sakurai; Tatsuya Shimizu; Fumimaru Taura; Soma Tokuyama; Hikaru Yamashita; Hisanori Yasuda

== Final standings ==
Rk	Team	W	L
1st place, gold medalist(s)	United States	9	0
Lost in final
2nd place, silver medalist(s)	South Korea	7	2
Failed to qualify for the final
3rd place, bronze medalist(s)	Japan	6	3
Lost in 3rd place game
4	Canada	5	4
Failed to qualify for the finals
5	Australia	4	4
6	Cuba	3	5
Failed to qualify for the super round
7	Chinese Taipei	6	2
8	Netherlands	4	4
9	Italy	2	6
10	Nicaragua	2	6
11	Mexico	2	6
12	South Africa	0	8

== Awards ==
Awards	Player
Most Valuable Player	(United States) Triston Casas
Outstanding Defensive Player	(Canada) Denzel Clarke

All-Tournament Team
Position	Player
C	(South Korea) Cho Dae-hyun
1B	(Italy) Leonardo Seminati
2B	(Cuba) César Prieto
3B	(Canada) Bo Naylor
SS	(United States) Brice Turang
OF	(United States) Michael Siani
OF	(United States) Alek Thomas
OF	(South Korea) Ye Jin-won
DH	(South Korea) Kang Baek-ho
P	(United States) Ethan Hankins
P	(Japan) Fumimaru Taura

== Statistics leaders ==
=== Batting ===
Statistic	Name	Total/Avg
Batting average*	(Cuba) César Prieto	.581
Hits	(Cuba) César Prieto	18
Runs	(United States) Michael Siani	12
Home runs	(United States) Triston Casas	3
Runs batted in	(United States) Triston Casas	13
Strikeouts	(Canada) Edouard Julien	16
Stolen bases	(United States) Michael Siani	7
On-base percentage*	(Cuba) César Prieto	.606
Slugging percentage*	(Nicaragua) Jeyner Sánchez	.750
OPS*	(Cuba) César Prieto	1.251

* Minimum 2.7 plate appearances per game

=== Pitching ===
Statistic	Name	Total/Avg
Wins	6 players	2
Losses	(South Africa) Mohamed Alaoui (Italy) Oscar Tucci	3
Saves	14 players	1
Innings pitched	(Netherlands) Donny Breek	16.2
Hits allowed	(South Africa) Mohamed Alaoui	22
Runs allowed	(South Africa) Mohamed Alaoui	20
Earned runs allowed	(South Africa) Mohamed Alaoui	16
Earned run average*	(United States) Matthew Liberatore (Japan) Ginji Miura	0.00**
Walks	(Mexico) Cristian Mendoza	12
Strikeouts	(Japan) Fumimaru Taura	29
WHIP*	(United States) Ethan Hankins	0.5

* Minimum 0.8 innings pitched per game
** They are tied with others with a 0.00 ERA but they pitched the most innings (12.0)
