= Kyungnam High School =

Kyungnam High School 경남고등학교

Location
- Dongdaesin 3-dong, Seo-gu, Busan, South Korea (+82)51-250-5000

Information
- Type: Public, College Preparatory
- Motto: Let's be frugal and self-reliant. Let's lead a free life in good order. Let's be cooperative with a deep sense of responsibility.
- Founded: Building, 1942; Namesake, 1953
- Principal: Wonyong Kim (2011)
- Enrollment: 968 (2011)
- Color: Blue White
- Mascot: Yongma (literally 'Dragon horse', a horse with wings)
- Website: kyungnam.hs.kr

Kyungnam High School (Korean: 경남고등학교) is a college preparatory high school in Busan, South Korea.

== History ==
Kyungnam High School was constructed in 1942, while Korea was under Japanese rule, as the name of Second Public Middle School of Busan. After the colonial rule ended on August 15, 1945, it reopened and continued its operation from October 1945, and was then renamed as Kyungnam Public Middle School in March 1946. During the Korean War, it was separated into First High School of Busan and West Middle School of Busan in August 1951. First High School of Busan held its first graduation ceremony in March 1952, still during the war. It got its current name in August 1953.

== Athletics ==
Kyungnam High School owns one of the best highschool baseball teams in South Korea. The team was established in 1945 and won several major national championships in South Korea. There are many alumni who are previous and current players in the Korea Professional Baseball League.

Kyungnam High School baseball team in four major national tournaments
Phoenix Flag National High-school Baseball Championship	Blue Dragon Flag National High-school Baseball Championship
2 Championships (since 1971)	9 Championships, 6 Second places (since 1946)
Golden Lion Flag National High-school Baseball Championship	President's Cup High-school Baseball Championship
6 Championships, 6 Second places (since 1947)	3 Second places(since 1967)

== Notable alumni ==
- Choi Dong-won, pitcher for Lotte Giants
- Choi Yun Sung, mathematician and president of National Institute for Mathematical Sciences
- Kim Young-sam, former president of South Korea
- Kwon Young-ghil, politician of South Korea
- Lee Dae-ho, current third baseman for Lotte Giants
- Moon Jae-in, former president of South Korea
- Park Sung-Jin, leader of DAY6
- Song Seung-jun, current pitcher for Lotte Giants
