= Leopoldo Nachbin =

Brazilian mathematician

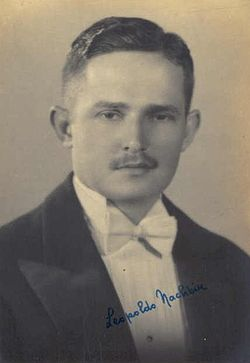
- Born: January 7, 1922
- Died: April 3, 1993 (aged 71)
- Scientific career
- Notable students: Choi Yun Sung

Leopoldo Nachbin (7 January 1922 – 3 April 1993) was a Brazilian mathematician of Jewish origins who dealt with topology and harmonic analysis.

Nachbin was born in Recife, and is best known for Nachbin's theorem. He died, aged 71, in Rio de Janeiro. He went to primary school in Recife with Brazilian literary giant Clarice Lispector. He is featured in one of her short stories, called “As Grandes Punições” (The Great Punishments) in her book “Aprendendo a Viver,” by the Rocco publishing house.

Nachbin was a Ph.D. student of Laurent Schwartz at the University of Chicago. His Ph.D. students include Francisco Antônio Dória and Seán Dineen. His monographs Topology and Order and The Haar Integral, both published by Van Nostrand-Reinhold in 1965, are regarded as exceptional expositions of the subjects. Overall he authored ten books, most of which were published internationally, and edited a dozen tomes of the prestigious North-Holland Mathematical Studies series between 1970 and the early 1980s. He is best known for a Tauberian-type theorem (Nachbin's theorem) on the growth rate of analytic functions, and for the so-called Hewitt–Nachbin space, a topological linear space that is bornological in the compact-open topology.

He was an invited speaker at the International Congress of Mathematicians (ICM) of 1962 in Stockholm ("Résultats récents et problèmes de nature algébrique en théorie de l'approximation"), being the first Brazilian speaker at the ICM.

== Bibliography ==
- Topology and Order (Van Nostrand-Reinhold, 1965)
- The Haar Integral (Van Nostrand-Reinhold, 1965; Krieger 1976)
- Elements of Approximation Theory (Van Nostrand-Reinhold, 1967; Krieger 1976)
- Introdução à Álgebra (McGraw-Hill, 1971, in Portuguese)
