= Kenji Nishimaki =

Japanese baseball player (born 1999)

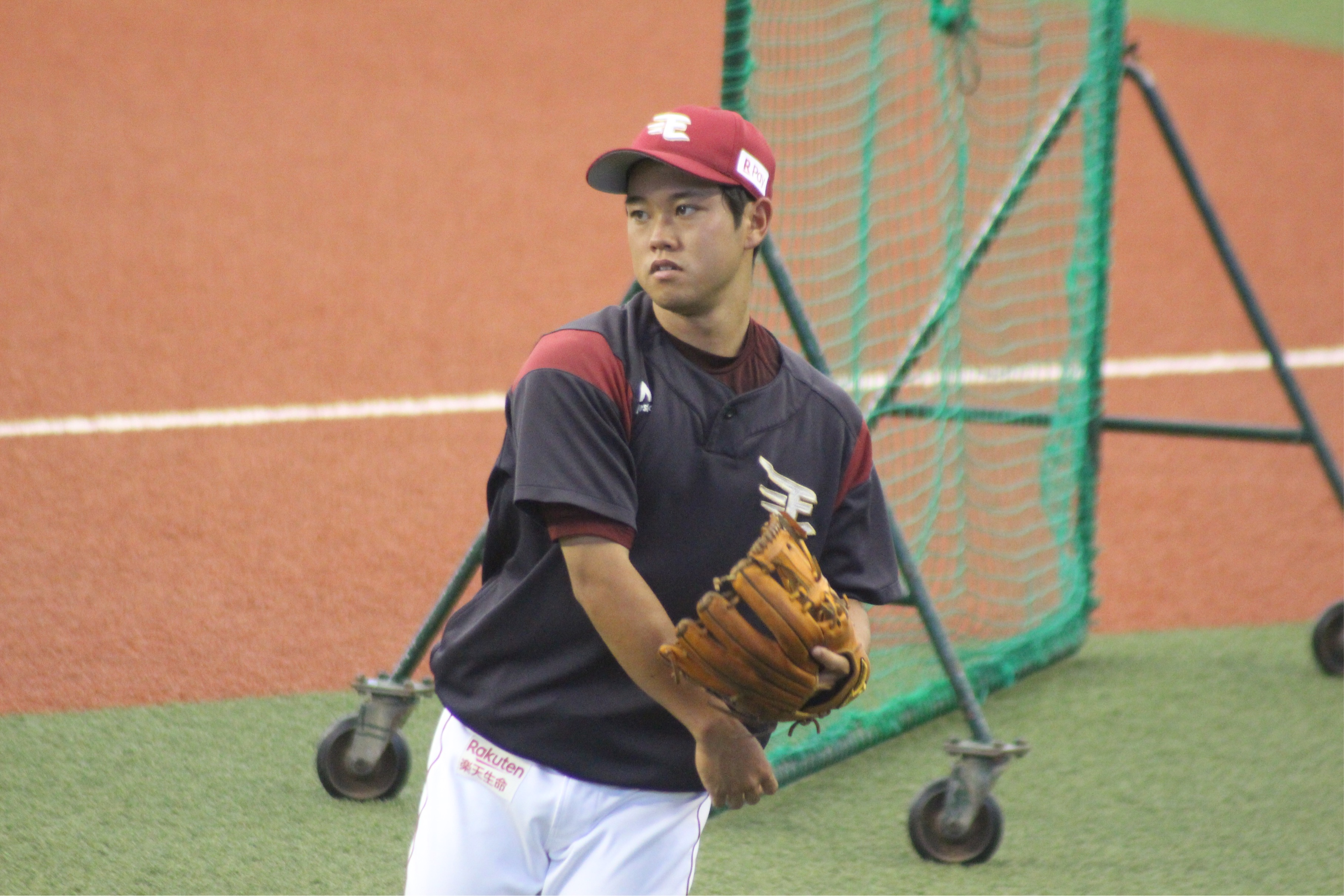

Yokohama DeNA BayStars – No. 129
- Infielder
- Born: April 22, 1999 (age 26); Aizuwakamatsu, Fukushima, Japan
- Bats: Right Throws: Right

NPB debut
- June 17, 2018, for the Tohoku Rakuten Golden Eagles

NPB statistics (through 2024 season)
- Batting average: .237
- Hits: 23
- Home runs: 0
- Runs batted in: 3
- Stolen base: 0

Teams
- Tohoku Rakuten Golden Eagles (2018–2019); Chiba Lotte Marines (2020–2022); Yokohama DeNA BayStars (2023-present)
Medals
Men's baseball
Representing Japan
U-18 Baseball World Cup
Bronze medal – third place	2017 Thunder Bay	Team

Kenji Nishimaki (西巻 賢二, Nishimaki Kenji; born April 22, 1999) is a professional Japanese baseball player for the Yokohama DeNA BayStars of Nippon Professional Baseball (NPB). He previously played for the Tohoku Rakuten Golden Eagles and Chiba Lotte Marines.
