= Hong Hyun-bin =

South Korean baseball player (born 1997)

Samsung Lions – No. 51
- Outfielder
- Born: August 29, 1997 (age 28); Suwon, South Korea
- Bats: Left Throws: Right

KBO debut
- 2017, for the KT WIZ

KBO statistics (through May 12, 2024)
- Batting average: .201
- Home runs: 0
- Runs batted in: 4
- Stats at Baseball Reference

Teams
- KT Wiz (2017–2018, 2020–2024); Samsung Lions (2025–present)

- Korean name
- Hangul: 홍현빈
- RR: Hong Hyeonbin
- MR: Hong Hyŏnbin

Hong Hyun-bin (Korean: 홍현빈; born August 29, 1997) is an outfielder for the Samsung Lions of the KBO League. He graduated Yushin High School.
