= Yong Seung Cho =

South Korean mathematician

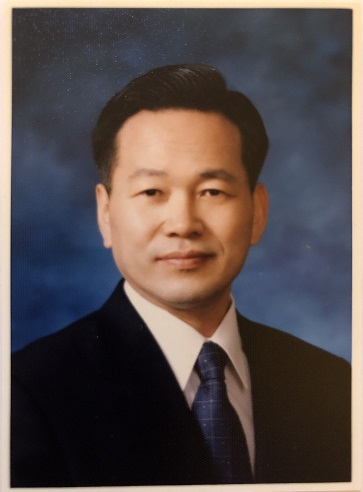
- Born: 1949 (age 77); South Korea
- Spouse: Su-Nam K. Cho
- Children: 2

Yong Seung Cho (Korean: 조용승; is a South Korean educator and mathematician. He completed a Ph.D. in mathematics in 1987 at the University of Chicago. His research interests include geometric topology, Yang-Mills Theory, Seiberg-Witten Theory, Gromov-Witten Theory, and Quantum cohomology of symplectic manifolds. His teaching career includes Chungbuk National University, Kyungpook National University, Brandeis University, and Ewha Womans University. Currently he teaches at Sungkyunkwan University as Invited Professor. In 2003, he was elected as President of the Korean Mathematical Society (KMS), and at the position, he played a pivotal role in establishing the National Institute for Mathematical Sciences (NIMS) in South Korea, the first national mathematical research center directly funded by the South Korean government. In 2005, he was selected as the first President of NIMS, and immediately began to set-up fundamental foundation of the NIMS to be innovative hub of the mathematical researches contributing to South Korea's overall scientific and industrial competitiveness.

== Education and career ==
Cho attended Kyungpook National University for bachelor and master programs in mathematics, and earned a doctorate in 1987 from the University of Chicago under the academic direction of Melvin Rothenburg, Karen Uhlenbeck, and Shmuel Weinberger. He became an assistant professor at Brandeis University in 1987, and moved to Ewha Womans University in Seoul as a full professor in 1989. He taught and researched at Ewha Womans University until retirement in 2015.

== Mathematical work ==
Cho has been a pure scientist for his entire life. He has researched on Yang-Mills Theory, Seiberg-Witten Theory, Gromov-Witten Theory, and Quantum cohomology of symplectic manifolds. Besides, he achieved a remarkable result on Big-Bang String Theory, [4][5][7] that is, as the early universe he used the string theory with Einstein's general relativity and Morse Theory to verify the expansion, shear, and rotation of the universe. Professor Cho's result was co-worked with physicist Professor ST Hong, so it is named "Cho-Hong String Theory." Also Cho initiated the Gromov-Witten type invariant, quantum type cohomology, and Floer type cohomology on cosymplectic manifolds, and induced an Arnold type theorem on odd dimensional manifolds. Professor Cho has published more than 130 academic research papers, and more than 15 text books on Topology, and has delivered more than 230 special lectures at various international conferences and scholarly events, including American Mathematical Society's Annual Conference and Harvard Math Colloquium Lecture Series.

In August 2025, Professor Cho proved the Hodge Conjecture and the Lefschetz Conjecture and the results were published in international peer-reviewed journals [Hodge Classes in Hodge Manifolds, Advances in Pure Mathematics, August 2025, Vol.15 No.8, 518-528]. In addition, the research book Calabi–Yau Manifolds and Mirror Symmetry was published in 2025. This book was selected as an Excellent Scholarly book by the National Academy of Sciences, Republic of Korea.

In October 2026, Professor Cho proved Kontsevich's conjecture on "the one-to-one correspondence between algebraic submanifolds and Lagrangian submanifolds within mirror symmetric manifolds," and published the findings in an international journal [Algebraic and Lagrangian Submanifolds on Mirror Pairs, Advances in Pure Mathematics, October 2026, Vol.16 No.10, 815-825].

== Service ==
Cho has been active in advancing South Korean mathematical research capabilities and national science development by holding several positions. Cho held President position of the Korean Mathematical Society (KMS, January 2003 – December 2004), and during this positionCho played a critical role in establishing the National Institute for Mathematical Sciences (NIMS) in South Korea, the first national mathematical research center directly funded by the South Korean government. Cho became the first President of NIMS (2005–2008) and set-up foundation of the NIMS to be innovative hub of the mathematical researches contributing to the Korea's overall mathematical researches and scientific competitiveness. Professor Cho also held Council member position of Presidential Council on National Science and Technology; led a math mentorship for ROK Science Gifted Student Academy; and wrote science columns as editorial writer for Kookmin Ilbo and other national newspapers. Professor Cho's six books are awarded as the Best Scholarly Books of the Year by the Republic of Korea's National Academy of Sciences, in recognition of creative works that help the public understanding in sciences (2026 Calabi-Yau Manifolds and Mirror Symmetry, 2022 Complex Manifolds, 2019 Topology, 2019 Differentiable Manifolds, 2011 Algebraic Topology, and 2002 Topology on Differentiable Manifolds).

Cho has been one of executive editors of Journal of Korean Mathematical Society (KMS) and Bulletin of KMS. Cho has been journal reviewers of American Mathematical Society (AMS) and European Mathematical Society (EMS).

== Awards and honors ==
Cho has received several honors and awards, including -"The Presidential Honors, President of South Korea Park Geun-hye (대한민국 대통령 옥조근정훈장, 2015),"

-"The 10th Ewha Academic Award (이화학술상, 2014)",

-"Mathematics Award, Microsoft Korea Inc. (마이크로소프트 수학상, 2003),"

-"Ewha Womans University "Award for Outstanding Science and Technology Papers,(이화여대 최고우수논문상 수상, 2001)",

-"Korean Federation of Science and Technology Societies (한국과학기술총연합회 우수논문상, 1992)"

-Professor Cho had been university fellow at the University of Chicago during his entire graduate studies in 1984–1987.

Image:

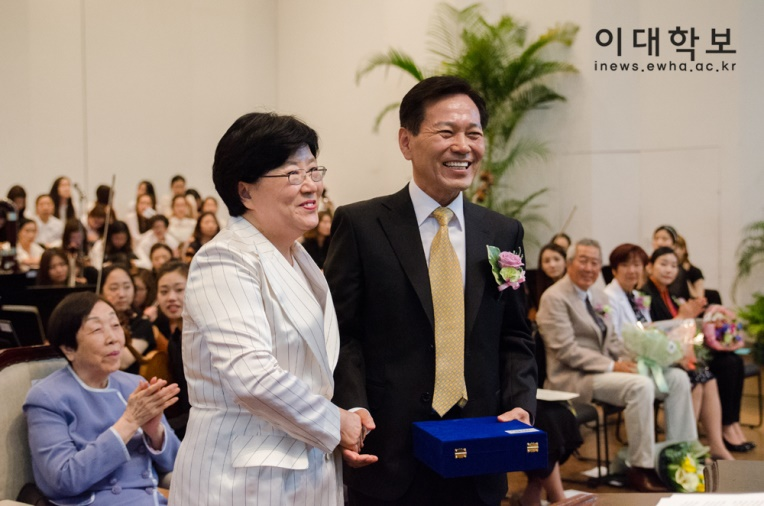
Ewha Womans University and its alumni association recognized his works and scholarly results by conferring "Ewha Academic Award" in 2014, and this award is given only one professor in the year 2014 (left, President of Ewha Kim Sun-wook and right, Professor Yong Seung Cho, 2014/05/30).

== Personal life ==
Cho married Su Nam (Kim) Cho, in January 1980. They had two sons.
