= Institute of Mathematics and Applications, Bhubaneswar =

Research and Education Institute in Bhubaneswar, India

- Motto: यथा शिखा मयूराणां, नागानां मणयो यथा । तथा वेदांगशास्ताणां गणितं मूर्धनि स्थितम‌् ।। (Sanskrit)
- Motto in English: Just as the crest among peacocks and the gem among serpents is at the top, so in all Vedas and scriptures the place of mathematics is at the top.
- Type: Research and Education Institute
- Established: 1999; 26 years ago
- Affiliations: Utkal University
- Chairman: Prof. Gadadhar Misra
- Director: Prof. Jasobanta Jena
- Location: Bhubaneswar, Odisha, India; 20°19′03″N 85°46′41″E
- Campus: Urban 23-acre (93,000 m^{2})
- Website: www.iomaorissa.ac.in

The Institute of Mathematics and Applications (IMA), located in Bhubaneswar, Odisha, in India, is a research and education institution that was established by the Government of Odisha in 1999. Its dual purposes are to conduct advanced research in pure and applied mathematics and to provide postgraduate education leading to master's and Ph.D. degrees in mathematics, computation, computational finance, and data science. The institute also runs training programs in schools aimed at increasing mathematics awareness and leading to competitions such as the Mathematics Olympiads. The UG and PG courses are currently affiliated to Utkal University, which is the largest affiliating university in the country.

== History ==
The institute was established by the Government of Odisha in the year 1999, vide the Resolution of the Government of Odisha, Science and Technology Department letter no. 368-ST-I (SC) – 159/98 dated 31 May 1999 with wide-ranging aims and objectives as notified in the Gazette No. 18, 23 July 1999 / SRAVANA, 1, 1921. The institute has been registered on 28 March 2000 under the provision of Registration of Societies Act 1860 with Registration No. 20851 /187 of 1999–2000. The institute began functioning in 1999 inside a room of the Pathani Samanta Planetarium in Bhubaneswar. On 23 July 2008, IMA acquired its residential campus, built by Tata Steel in Bhubaneswar city, when it was established as a full-fledged, degree-granting academic institution. The new institute was inaugurated by Sj. Naveen Patnaik was then the honorable chief minister. On 2022 Government decided to convert the institute into a full-fledged university and a centre of excellence.

== Academics ==
=== B.Sc. Honors in Mathematics and Computing ===
The institute offers a Bachelor of Science (Honors) Degree in Mathematics and Computing. The course includes the study of pure mathematics as well as mathematical modeling and the use of abstract methods to solve concrete problems. Computer Science is major and compulsory for every student and it includes the study of Algorithms design, Analysis, Cellular Automata, and other branches in Theoretical Computer Science. Rigorous training and a lot of exposure to pure mathematics are given to the students. In the final semester, each student must submit a dissertation.

=== M.A./M.Sc. in Computational Finance ===
Finance as a subject has emerged to be an extremely involved branch of knowledge with a growing number of stock exchanges and investors in the field. Risk and return that constitute cardinal aspects of the subject remain as a major concern for every investor, individual as well as institutional. Volumes of data encountered in the process make investment decisions difficult. In apparently erratic behaviors of the market, however, the mathematicians try to capture patterns vis-a-vis predictability, which may help investors decide on their investment. Computational finance otherwise called financial engineering deals with portfolio selection, options, and futures, asset pricing, managing derivative markets, and hedging under uncertainty. The course imparts, besides, basic grounding on finance, expertise for modeling under uncertainty, a high level of computational skill geared towards finance, knowledge of financial accounting and regulations. The aim is to produce a competent financial engineer capable of analyzing existing financial products and suggesting new innovative products for the financial market.

=== M.A./M.Sc. in Mathematics with Data Science ===
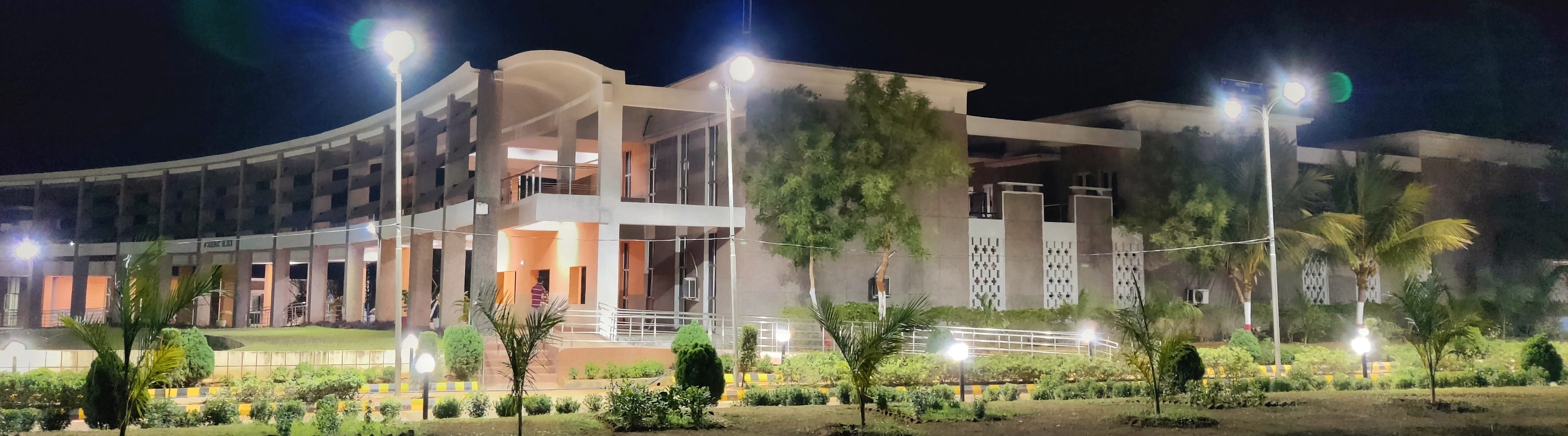
Night view of the Academic Block

The institute started a master's degree program in Data Science.

=== Admission criteria ===
The institute conducts a nationwide entrance exam near the end of July to avoid clashing with other major entrance exams. The results are usually announced in August. IMA conducts the written tests at various examination centers across India.

== Campus ==
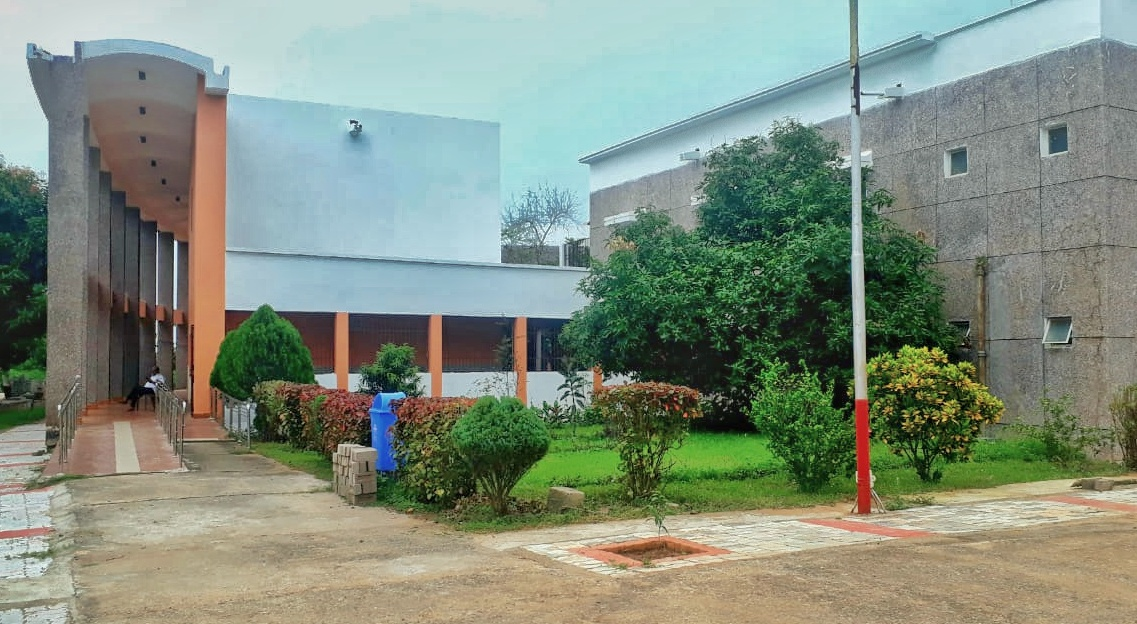
Hostel

The main Institute is a 7,000 square meters (75,000 sq ft) complex, which was designed by architect Karan Grover, with an investment of Rs. 140 million. The 23-acre (93,000 m2) campus also includes computer laboratories, classrooms, a library, as well as residential accommodations. A playground and a volleyball court are also included. The institute provides an in-campus hostel facility for both boys and girls separately. The excellent study environment and sophisticated accommodation of the hostel accelerate the research potentiality of the students as well as research fellows. A well-stocked library with more than 5000 latest references on mathematical, financial, computational, and related subjects, as well as national and international professional journals, which support the institute's teaching, research, and extension programs.

== Activities ==
The current focus areas of research within the institute include Wavelet analysis, Stochastic processes, Functional analysis, Algebraic topology, Differential geometry, Group representations, Operator theory, Fuzzy logic, Geometric applications in Physics, Approximation theory, Lie algebra, Astronomy, Thermodynamics, and Statistical Physics, Quantum mechanics and Cyclone modeling, Machine Learning in Finance, Computational Finance, etc.

The institute offers a B.Sc. Honors degree in Mathematics and Computing as well as M.Sc. degrees in Computational Finance and Mathematics with Data Science. It currently admits 30 students each year based on a national entrance examination.

It also provides training to school students for mathematical competitions. The institute professes to investigate the mathematical tradition of ancient India. It also provides awards to eminent mathematicians in the state of Odisha.

Submitted projects of the institute as of 2021 are:

- Workshop on Wavelets and its application.
- International Workshop on Lie Theory Integrable Systems and Mathematical Physics
- Project on Ancient Indian Mathematics and its Contemporarily Relevance
- A project on a comprehensive Lexicon and Transformal Grammar in the Odia Language
- A book writing project on Analysis and Applications in progress.
- A project on Fuzzy Mathematics and Applications
- A project on Ethno Mathematics
- A project on the Mathematical Heritage of Orissa

=== Past events ===
The institute organized the 48th Annual Conference of the Odisha Mathematical Society in April 2021, which was set to attract academicians and industry-folk from all over India. The institute also hosted the 31st Annual Conference in 2004.

== See also ==
- Education in Odisha
- Indian Institute of Technology Bhubaneswar
- Institute of Mathematics (disambiguation)
- International Institute of Information Technology, Bhubaneswar
- National Institute of Science Education and Research, Bhubaneswar
