= Ethan Hankins =

American baseball player (born 2000)

- Pitcher
- Born: May 23, 2000 (age 26); Cumming, Georgia, U.S.
- Bats: Right Throws: Right
Medals
Men's baseball
Representing United States
U-18 Baseball World Cup
Gold medal – first place	2017 Thunder Bay	Team

Ethan Gordon Hankins (born May 23, 2000) is an American former professional baseball pitcher. He was drafted by the Cleveland Indians in the first round of the 2018 MLB draft, but never played in Major League Baseball (MLB).

== Amateur career ==
Hankins attended Forsyth Central High School in Cumming, Georgia. As a junior in 2017, he had a 0.90 earned run average (ERA) with 77 strikeouts in 46 2/3 innings pitched and was named the Forsyth County News Pitcher of the Year. After the season, he played in the Under Armour All-America Baseball Game and played for the USA Baseball 18U National Team.

== Professional career ==
=== Cleveland Indians / Guardians ===
Hankins committed to Vanderbilt University to play college baseball. He was drafted 35th overall by the Cleveland Indians in the 2018 Major League Baseball draft. After the draft, Hankins signed to play baseball at Chipola College. However, he eventually signed with Cleveland rather than attend college.

Hankins made his professional debut with the rookie–level Arizona League Indians, pitching three innings. He began 2019 with the Low–A Mahoning Valley Scrappers before being promoted to the Single–A Lake County Captains in August. Over 14 games (13 starts) between the two clubs, he pitched to a 0–3 record with a 2.55 ERA, striking out 71 over sixty innings.

Hankins did not play a minor league game in 2020 due to the cancellation of the minor league season because of the COVID-19 pandemic. He missed all of the 2021 and 2022 seasons (aside from one rehab appearance for the Arizona Complex League Guardians in 2022) after undergoing Tommy John surgery. Hankins returned in 2023 with the High–A Lake County Captains, compiling a 1–7 record and 4.70 ERA with 50 strikeouts across 15 starts.

Hankins was released by the Guardians organization on July 20, 2024, having pitched in only one game in the 2024 season for the Double-A Akron RubberDucks due to time spent on the injured list. Hankins' time in the Guardians' organization concluded with him having made only 32 appearances in his seven-year minor league career.

=== Gary SouthShore RailCats ===
On August 2, 2024, Hankins signed with the Gary SouthShore RailCats of the American Association of Professional Baseball. In four games (three starts) for Gary, Hankins struggled to an 0-2 record and 9.82 ERA with 17 strikeouts over 11 innings of work.
