= Fumimaru Taura =

Japanese baseball player (born 1999)

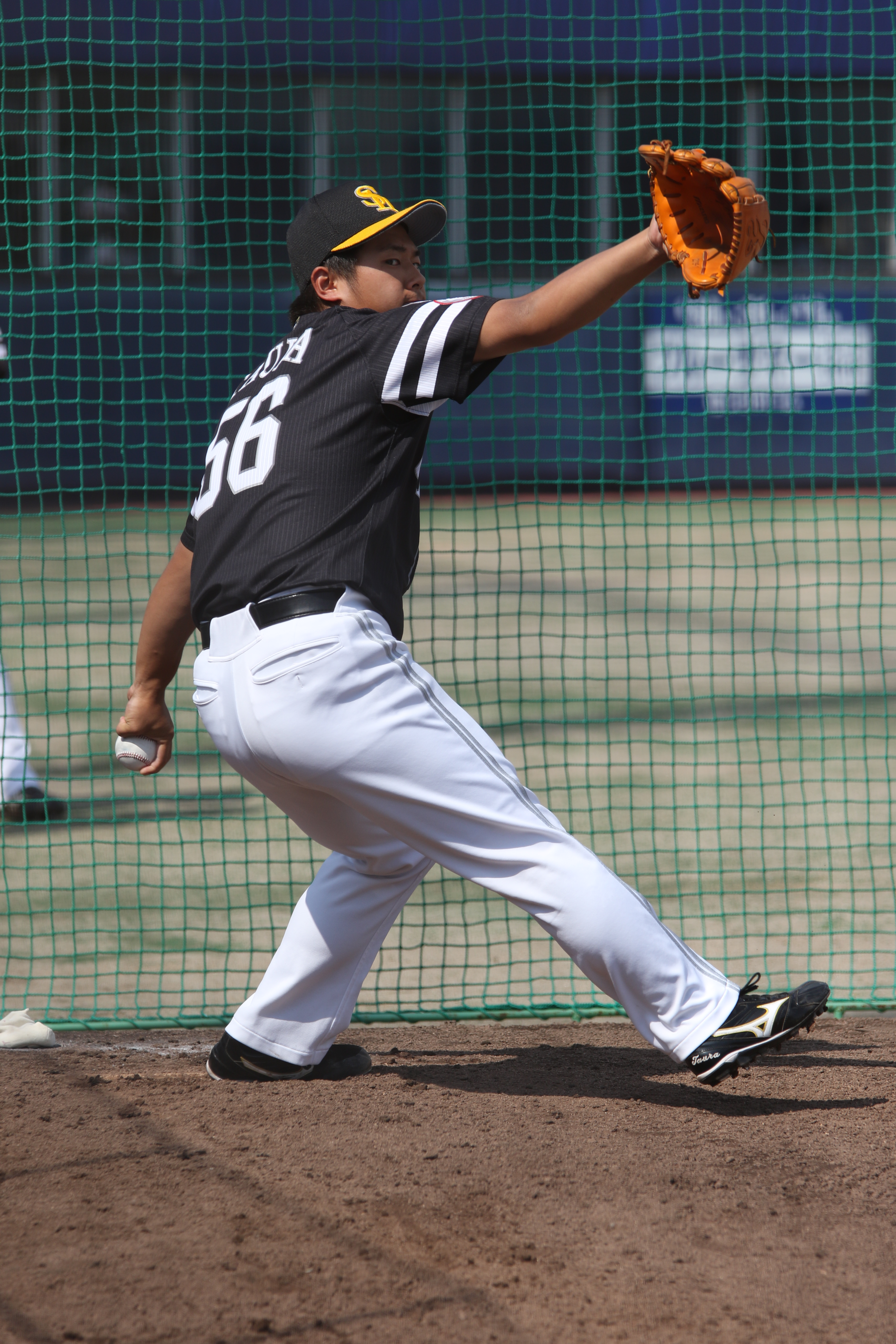
- Taura with the Fukuoka SoftBank Hawks.

Fukuoka SoftBank Hawks – No. 56
- Pitcher
- Born: September 21, 1999 (age 26); Ōnojō, Fukuoka, Japan
- Bats: Left Throws: Left

NPB debut
- July 10, 2019, for the Fukuoka SoftBank Hawks

NPB statistics (through 2024 season)
- Win–loss record: 3-1
- Earned run average: 3.42
- Strikeouts: 56
- Stats at Baseball Reference

Teams
- Fukuoka SoftBank Hawks (2018–present)

Career highlights and awards
- Japan Series champion (2025)
Medals
Men's baseball
Representing Japan
U-18 Baseball World Cup
Bronze medal – third place	2017 Thunder Bay	Team

Fumimaru Taura (田浦 文丸, Taura Fumimaru; born September 21, 1999) is a Japanese professional baseball pitcher for the Fukuoka SoftBank Hawks of Nippon Professional Baseball (NPB).

== Early baseball career ==
Taura pitched in the 2nd grade spring 88th Japanese High School Baseball Invitational Tournament and the 2nd grade summer 98th Japanese High School Baseball Championship. And he pitched in the 3rd grade spring 89th Japanese High School Baseball Invitational Tournament and the 3rd grade summer 99th Japanese High School Baseball Championship as an ace pitcher at the Syugakukan High School.

In 2017, he was selected as the Japan national baseball team in the 2017 U-18 Baseball World Cup and recorded 29 Strikeouts in 13 2/3 innings, and was chosen as the Best Nine.

== Professional career ==
On October 26, 2017, Taura was drafted by the Fukuoka Softbank Hawks in the 2017 Nippon Professional Baseball draft.

In 2018 season, Taura played in the Western League of NPB's minor leagues and played in informal matches against the Shikoku Island League Plus's teams.

On July 10, 2019, Taura debuted in the Pacific League against the Saitama Seibu Lions as a relief pitcher. In 2019 season, he pitched 8 games in the Pacific League.

In 2020 season, Taura spent the season rehabilitating back and left shoulder pain and only pitched in one game in the Western League.

On April 11, 2021, Taura pitched as a relief pitcher against the Tohoku Rakuten Golden Eagles, and recorded his first win. In 2021 season, he finished the regular season with a 19 Games pitched, a 1–0 Win–loss record, a 3.38 ERA, a one Hold, and a 17 strikeouts in 21.1 innings.

In 2022 season, hee only pitched in four games in the Pacific League.

On June 17, 2023, Taura became a winning pitcher for the first time in two years in an interleague play against the Hanshin Tigers, where he pitched as a relief pitcher. He continued to contribute to the team as a relief pitcher and finished the regular season with a career-high 45 games pitched, a 2-1 Win–loss record, a 2.38 ERA, a 7 holds, and a 28 strikeouts in 34 innings.
