= Ji-hwan Bae =

South Korean baseball player (born 1999)

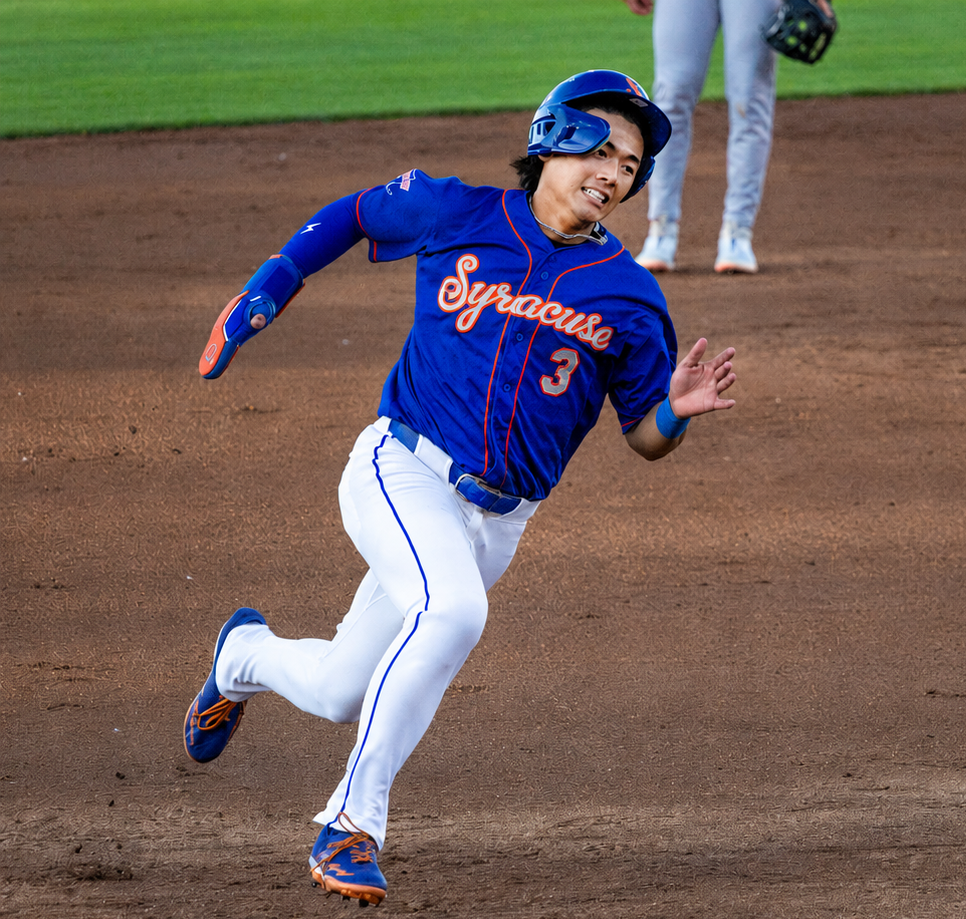
- Bae with the Syracuse Mets in 2026

Free agent
- Center fielder / Second baseman
- Born: July 26, 1999 (age 27); Daegu, South Korea
- Bats: Left Throws: Right

MLB debut
- September 23, 2022, for the Pittsburgh Pirates

MLB statistics (through 2026 season)
- Batting average: .225
- Home runs: 2
- Runs batted in: 44
- Stats at Baseball Reference

Teams
- Pittsburgh Pirates (2022–2025); Milwaukee Brewers (2026)
Medals
Men's baseball
Representing South Korea
U-18 Baseball World Cup
Silver medal – second place	2017 Thunder Bay	Team

Ji-hwan Bae (born July 26, 1999) is a South Korean professional baseball center fielder and second baseman who is a free agent. He has previously played in Major League Baseball (MLB) for the Pittsburgh Pirates and the Milwaukee Brewers. In 2017, the Atlanta Braves announced the signing of Bae as a free agent. He made his MLB debut in 2022.

== Amateur career ==
Bae represented South Korea at the 2017 U-18 Baseball World Cup. During the tournament, he hit for a .286 batting average with five RBIs, six runs scored, six walks and two stolen bases. In his final high school baseball season, Bae appeared in 27 games, hit .474, and received the Lee Young-min Batting Award as South Korea's best hitter at the high school level. Bae was projected to be a first round pick in the 2017 KBO League draft.

== Professional career ==
=== Atlanta Braves ===
On September 23, 2017, the Atlanta Braves announced the signing of Bae as a free agent. General manager John Coppolella claimed that Bae was the youngest Asian baseball player to sign with the Braves in nearly two decades. By joining the Braves, Bae would have become the second player since Kwon Kwang-min, who signed with the Chicago Cubs in 2015, to leave a South Korean high school directly for professional baseball in the United States. On November 21, 2017, Major League Baseball voided his contract with the Braves as a result of fraudulent contract negotiations. The New York Times reported that, although Bae had agreed to sign for $300,000, the Braves planned to pay him an additional $600,000 by reallocating money promised to other signees. The KBO League barred Bae from signing with any South Korean professional team for two years because he had skipped the KBO's draft to join the Braves organization, where he appeared with Atlanta's Florida Instructional League team.

=== Pittsburgh Pirates ===
==== Minor leagues ====
On March 27, 2018, the Pittsburgh Pirates signed Bae for a reported signing bonus of $1.25 million. Bae finished the 2019 season with the Greensboro Grasshoppers. He then played for Geelong-Korea in the Australian Baseball League during the offseason. Bae did not play in a game in 2020 due to the cancellation of the minor league season because of the COVID-19 pandemic.

Bae was assigned to the Altoona Curve in 2021. At the Double-A level, he recorded a slash line of .278/.359/.413 with 12 doubles, five triples, seven homers and 31 RBI in 83 games. After the minor league season ended, Bae was assigned to the Peoria Javelinas and selected to the Arizona Fall League Fall Stars Game. Bae spent most of the 2022 season with the Indianapolis Indians, where he appeared in 108 games, slashed .289/.362/.430 with 23 doubles, six triples, eight home runs and 53 RBI.

==== Major leagues ====
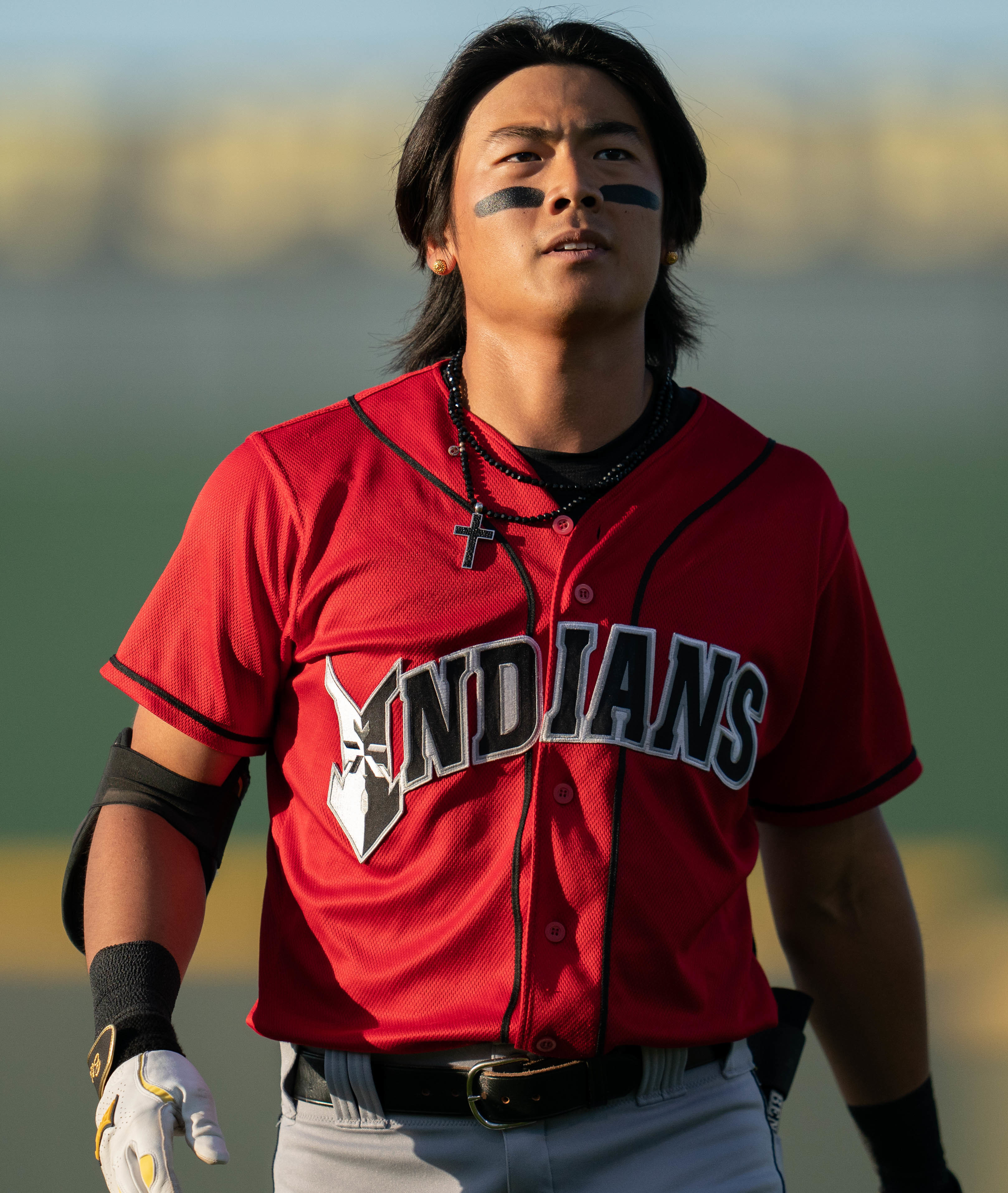
Bae with the Indianapolis Indians in 2022

On September 23, 2022, Bae made his major league debut. He started at second base for the Pirates in a game against the Chicago Cubs, was walked once, hit a single, and stole two bases. Bae made 10 appearances for Pittsburgh during his rookie campaign, going 11-for-33 (.333) with six RBI and three stolen bases.

Bae made the Pirates' 2023 Opening Day roster. On April 4, 2023, he hit his first major league home run. In 111 total appearances for Pittsburgh, Bae batted .231/.296/.311 with two home runs, 32 RBI, and 24 stolen bases.

Bae began the 2024 season in the minor leagues, initially with Low-A Bradenton, on rehabilitation assignment for a muscle strain. The Pirates recalled Bae from Triple-A Indianapolis in May; Bae recorded his first MLB hit and RBI of the season on the same day: May 21, 2024. He played in 29 games for the Pirates during the year, slashing .189/.247/.216 with six RBI and six stolen bases.

Bae made the team's Opening Day roster in 2025, and was optioned to Indianapolis on April 3, 2025. He played in only 13 games for Pittsburgh, going 1-for-20 (.050) with four stolen bases. On November 4, the Pirates placed Bae on waivers.

=== New York Mets ===
On November 6, 2025, Bae was claimed off waivers by the New York Mets. He cleared waivers and was sent outright to the Triple-A Syracuse Mets on January 8, 2026. Bae made 91 appearances for Syracuse, slashing .257/.360/.368 with five home runs, 32 RBI, and 36 stolen bases. He was released by the Mets organization on August 4.

=== Milwaukee Brewers ===
On August 9, 2026, Bae signed a minor league contract with the Milwaukee Brewers; Milwaukee subsequently selected his contract and added him to their active roster. In four appearances for the Brewers, he went 1–for–2 (.500) with one stolen base. Bae was designated for assignment by Milwaukee on August 15. He cleared waivers and was assigned outright to the Triple–A Nashville Sounds on August 19. He elected free agency on November 2.

== Personal life ==
Born in July 1999, Bae attended Kyeongbuk High School in Daegu. He grew up as a fan of South Korean professional baseball, and began watching Major League Baseball when fellow South Korea native Shin-Soo Choo joined the Cleveland Indians. Bae soon became a fan of Hyun-jin Ryu, Jung-ho Kang, and Jose Altuve.

=== Assault conviction ===
In May 2018, Bae was accused of slapping, choking, and kicking his ex-girlfriend in 2017 on New Year's Eve, when he was 18 years old. In October 2018, he was convicted of assault in court in Daegu and required to pay a fine of ₩2 million. In April 2019, Major League Baseball suspended Bae without pay for 30 games because of the incident.
