= Cho Dae-hyun =

South Korean baseball player (born 1999)

KT Wiz – No. 42
- Catcher
- Born: August 6, 1999 (age 25); Seoul, South Korea
- Bats: Right Throws: Right

KBO debut
- June 16, 2022, for the KT Wiz

KBO statistics (through May 17, 2024)
- Batting average: .300
- Home runs: 0
- Runs batted in: 1

Teams
- KT Wiz (2022, 2024–present)
Medals
Men's baseball
Representing South Korea
U-18 Baseball World Cup
Silver medal – second place	2017 Thunder Bay	Team

- Korean name
- Hangul: 조대현
- RR: Jo Daehyeon
- MR: Cho Taehyŏn

Cho Dae-hyun (Korean: 조대현; born August 6, 1999) is the catcher of KT Wiz of the KBO League. He graduated Yushin High School.
