= Shu Masuda =

Japanese baseball player (born 1999)

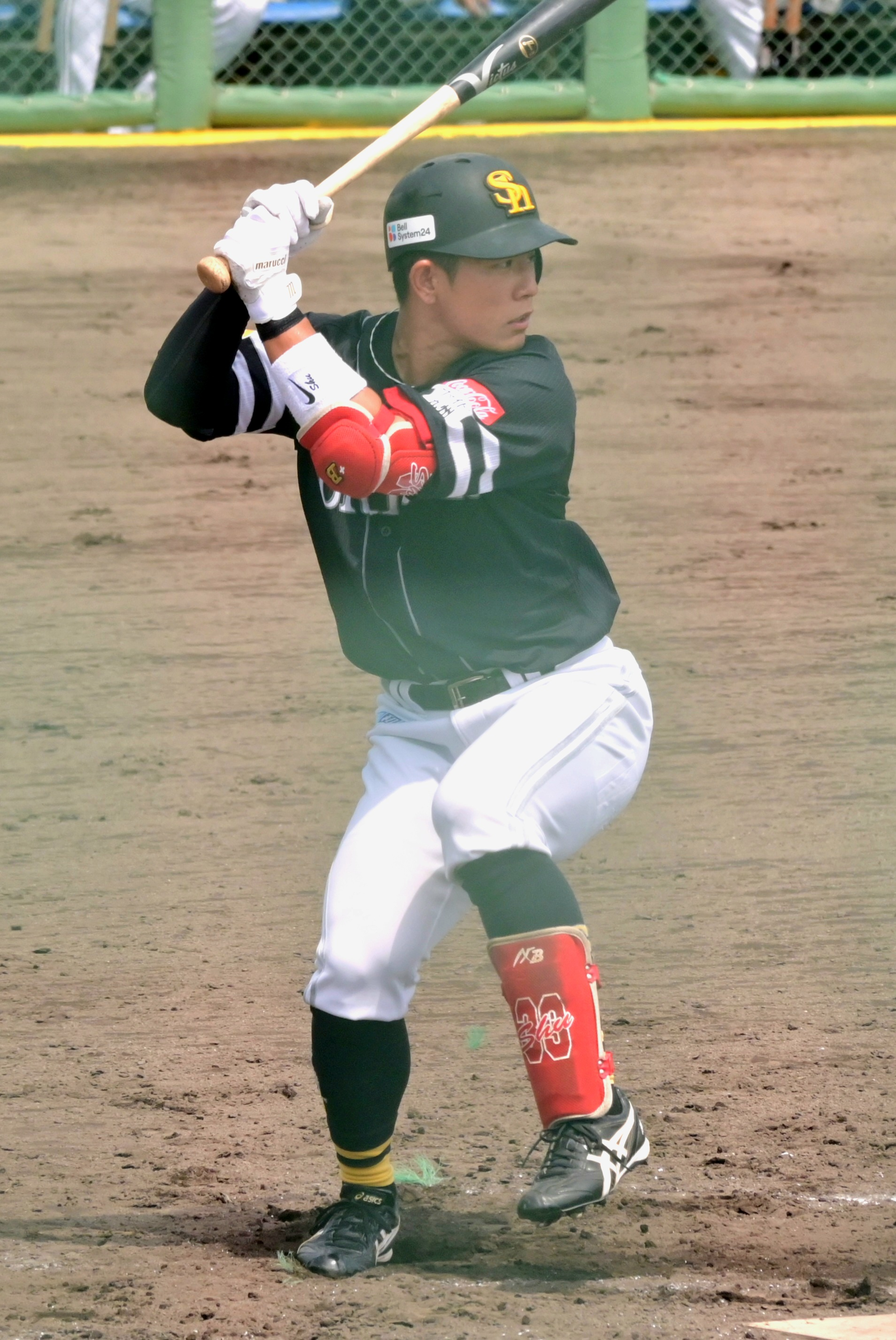

Tokyo Yakult Swallows – No. 63
- Infielder
- Born: May 21, 1999 (age 26); Nagasaki, Nagasaki, Japan
- Bats: Right Throws: Right

NPB debut
- September 28, 2019, for the Fukuoka SoftBank Hawks

NPB statistics (through May 26, 2025)
- Batting average: .212
- Home runs: 4
- Runs batted in: 19
- Stats at Baseball Reference

Teams
- Fukuoka SoftBank Hawks (2018–2023); Tokyo Yakult Swallows (2024–present)
Medals
Men's baseball
Representing Japan
U-18 Baseball World Cup
Bronze medal – third place	2017 Thunder Bay	Team

Shu Masuda (増田 珠, Masuda Shū; born May 21, 1999) is a Japanese professional baseball Infielder for the Tokyo Yakult Swallows of Nippon Professional Baseball. He previously played in NPB for the Fukuoka SoftBank Hawks.

== Early baseball career ==
Masuda participated in the 2nd grade summer the 98th Japanese High School Baseball Championship and 3rd grade summer the 99th Japanese High School Baseball Championship as a Center fielder of the Yokohama High School.

== Professional career ==
=== Fukuoka SoftBank Hawks ===
On October 26, 2017, Masuda was drafted by the Fukuoka SoftBank Hawks in the 2017 Nippon Professional Baseball draft.

In the 2018 season, Masuda played in the Western League of NPB's minor leagues.

On September 28, 2019, Masuda debuted in the Pacific League against the Orix Buffaloes. In 2019, he played 2 games in the Pacific League. On November 27, Masuda underwent surgery on his right wrist.

In 2020, Masuda spent the season rehabilitating his right wrist and was unable to play in the Pacific League.

In 2021 season, Masuda never got a chance to play in the first league.

In 2022 season, Masuda was registered in the first team registration on July 17. He recorded his first hit that day, a home run, against the Chiba Lotte Marines. While his main players tested positive for COVID-19 and were out for rehabilitation, he was active, hitting the first two runs hit of the game on August 26 against the Hokkaido Nippon-Ham Fighters, And He was a member of the "Chikugo Hawks" and supported the team until the main players returned. (a nickname given to the younger reserve players. Chikugo is the name of the place where the Hawks farm team is located.) He finished the regular season with a .256 batting average, one home run, and 6 RBI in 15 games.

In 2023 season, Masuda finished the regular season in 35 games with a batting average of .182, a one home runs, a RBI of 3, and a one sacrifice bunts. On October 22, the Hawks announced release him.

=== Tokyo Yakult Swallows ===
On November 28, 2023, Masuda signed with the Tokyo Yakult Swallows.

== International career ==
Masuda was selected for the Japan national baseball team at the 2014 15U Baseball World Cup and the Japan national baseball team at the 2017 U-18 Baseball World Cup.
