= Tatsuya Shimizu =

Japanese baseball player (born 1999)

Tatsuya Shimizu 清水 達也
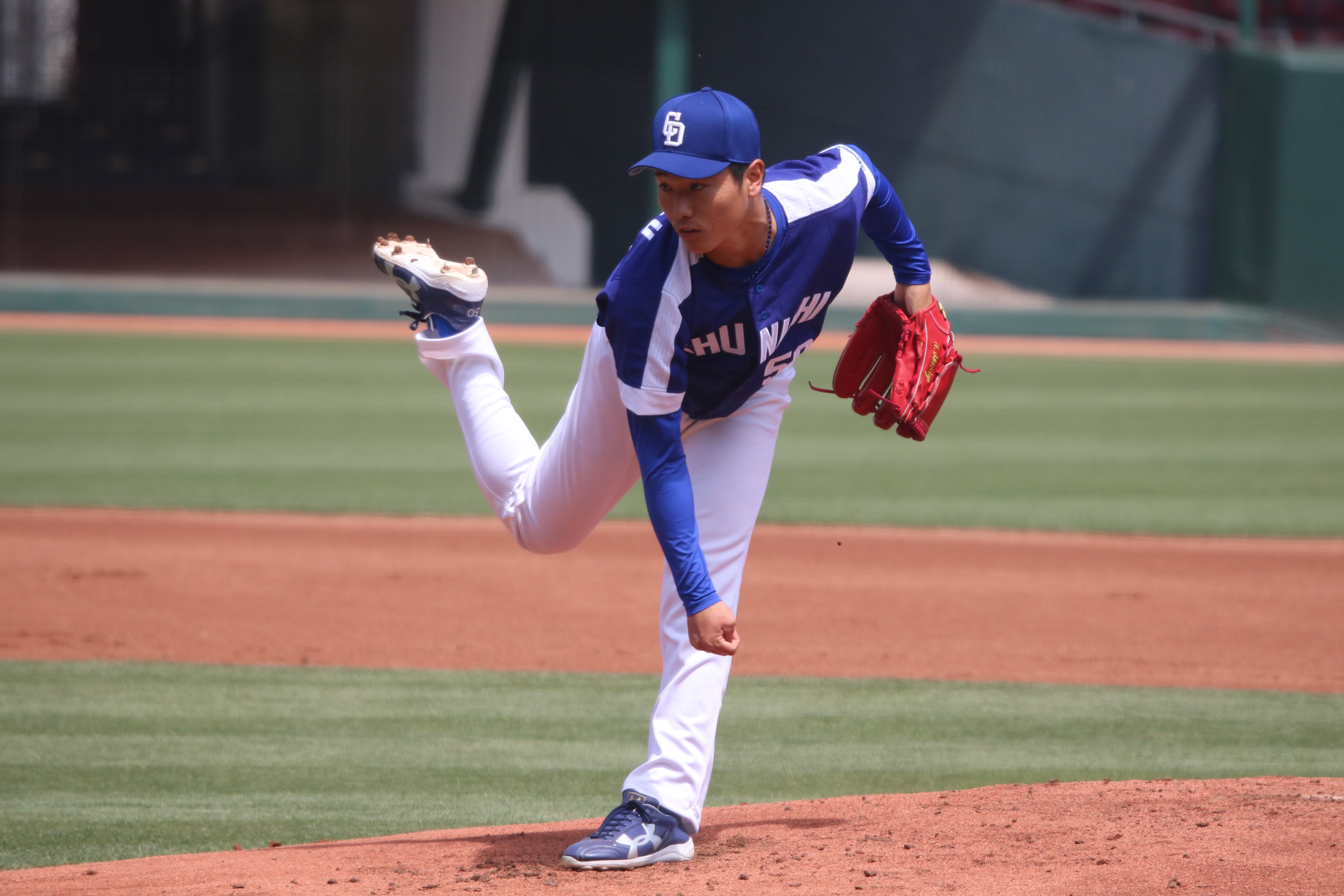

Chunichi Dragons – No. 50
- Pitcher
- Born: November 3, 1999 (age 26); Fukaya, Saitama, Japan
- Bats: Right Throws: Right

NPB debut
- June 27, 2018, for the Chunichi Dragons

NPB statistics (through July 25, 2026)
- Win–loss record: 16-12
- Earned run average: 2.94
- Strikeouts: 256
- Stats at Baseball Reference

Teams
- Chunichi Dragons (2018–present)

Career highlights and awards
- NPB All-Star (2025)
Medals
Men's baseball
Representing Japan
WBSC Premier12
Silver medal – second place	2024	Team
U-18 Baseball World Cup
Bronze medal – third place	2017 Thunder Bay	Team

Tatsuya Shimizu (清水 達也, Shimizu Tatsuya; born November 3, 1999) is a Japanese baseball pitcher for the Chunichi Dragons of Nippon Professional Baseball (NPB).

== Career ==
On 20 October 2017, Shimizu was selected as the 4th draft pick for the Chunichi Dragons at the 2017 NPB Draft and on 20 November signed a provisional contract with a ¥40,000,000 sign-on bonus and a ¥6,000,000 yearly salary.

Shimizu looks up to fellow pros, Kodai Senga and Yasuaki Yamasaki for inspiration.
