= Triston Casas =

American baseball player (born 2000)

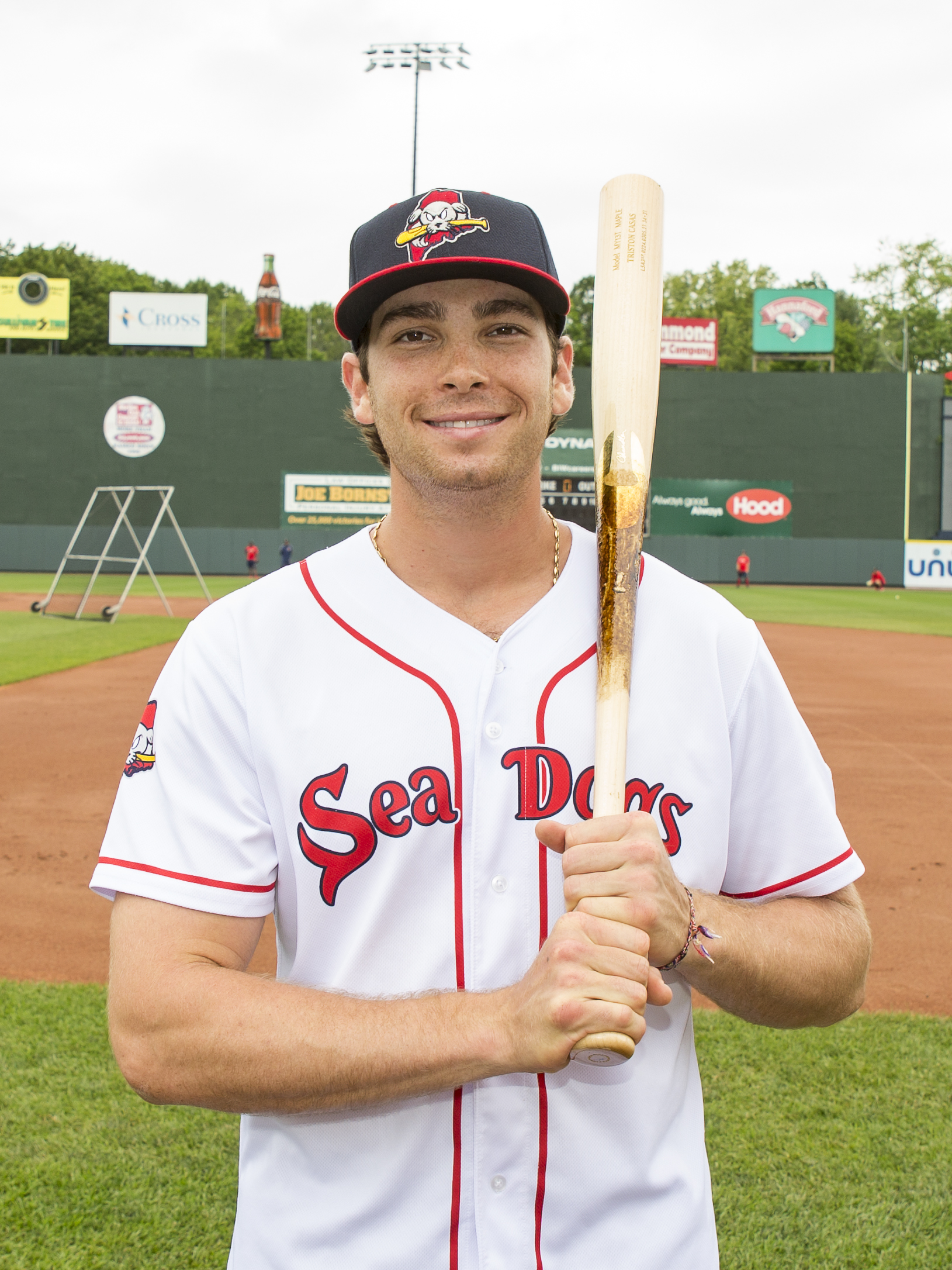
- Casas with the Portland Sea Dogs in 2021

Boston Red Sox – No. 36
- First baseman
- Born: January 15, 2000 (age 26); Pembroke Pines, Florida, U.S.
- Bats: Left Throws: Right

MLB debut
- September 4, 2022, for the Boston Red Sox

MLB statistics (through 2025 season)
- Batting average: .241
- Home runs: 45
- Runs batted in: 120
- Stats at Baseball Reference

Teams
- Boston Red Sox (2022–2025)

Career highlights and awards
- Tokyo 2020 All-Olympic Baseball Team (2021)
Medals
Men's baseball
Representing United States
U-18 Baseball World Cup
Gold medal – first place	2017 Thunder Bay	Team
Olympic Games
Silver medal – second place	2020 Tokyo	Team

Triston Ray Casas (born January 15, 2000) is an American professional baseball first baseman for the Boston Red Sox of Major League Baseball (MLB). The Red Sox selected him in the first round of the 2018 MLB draft and he made his MLB debut in 2022. Casas was a member of the United States national baseball team at the 2020 Summer Olympics, which won the silver medal.

== Amateur career ==
Casas played high school baseball at American Heritage School in Plantation, Florida, where he played both corner infield positions. In two varsity seasons at American Heritage, Casas had a .414 batting average with 11 home runs and 53 runs batted in (RBIs) in 53 games played. He reclassified and graduated high school a year early to be eligible for the Major League Baseball (MLB) draft. He played in the Under Armour All-America Baseball Game in both 2016 and 2017.

== Professional career ==
The Boston Red Sox chose Casas in the first round, with the 26th overall selection, of the 2018 MLB draft. He signed with the Red Sox, receiving a $2,552,800 signing bonus, the full slot value for the pick, and a salary of $774,000 per year. He was assigned to Boston's Rookie League team, the Gulf Coast League Red Sox. In a game on June 25, Casas was injured while playing third base; he subsequently underwent season-ending surgery on June 29, to repair a torn ulnar collateral ligament in his right thumb.

Casas began 2019 with the Greenville Drive of the Single–A South Atlantic League. While playing for the Greenville Drive, Casas was named a South Atlantic League Mid-Season All Star in 2019. In early June, he was named to the South Atlantic League All-Star Game. In mid-June, Casas was added to the top 100 prospects list of Baseball America, at number 98. In late August, he was named a South Atlantic League Postseason All-Star, as well as the Baseball America Red Sox 2019 Minor League Player Of The Year. On September 1, Casas was promoted to the High–A Salem Red Sox. In mid-September, he was named the Red Sox' minor league offensive player of the year. Over 122 games between the two clubs, Casas slashed .254/.349/.476 with 20 home runs and 81 RBI.

During 2020, with no minor league season due to the COVID-19 pandemic shutdown, the Red Sox added Casas to their pool of reserve players on August 20, so he could participate in intra-squad workouts. He was subsequently invited to participate in the Red Sox' fall instructional league. Following the 2020 season, Casas was ranked by Baseball America as the Red Sox' number one prospect. Casas began the 2021 season in Double-A with the Portland Sea Dogs. In addition to playing 77 games for Portland, Casas also appeared in nine games for the Triple-A Worcester Red Sox, batting a combined .279 with 14 home runs and 59 RBI. After the regular season, Casas was selected to play in the Arizona Fall League, and was named the starting first baseman for the East team in the league's annual Fall Stars Game.

The Red Sox invited Casas to spring training as a non-roster player in 2022. He returned to Worcester to start the season. In May 2022, he was ranked 18th in the list of baseball's top 100 prospects by Baseball America. Casas sustained a high ankle sprain in mid-May, causing him to miss over a month of playing time. The Red Sox promoted Casas to the major leagues on September 4, and he made his MLB debut that day. In his debut, Casas recorded his first career hit, a single off of John King of the Texas Rangers. Two days later, he hit his first career home run off of J. T. Chargois of the Tampa Bay Rays. In 27 games with Boston, he batted .197 with five home runs and 12 RBI. In 72 games with Triple-A Worcester, he batted .273 with 11 home runs and 38 RBI. After the season, he played for Tigres del Licey in the Dominican Winter League.

In January 2023, Casas was ranked 29th in the Baseball America list of top 100 prospects. Casas was Boston's opening day first baseman to start the 2023 season. However, he struggled in the first month of his first full major league season, hitting only .137 over 24 games in April. However, once April ended, Casas turned it around and established himself as the Red Sox' regular first baseman. For the month of July, he received the AL Rookie of the Month Award after batting .348 with seven home runs and 13 RBI in 21 games. In mid-August, he missed two games at Yankee Stadium due to a tooth infection. Casas was placed on the injured list on September 16 due to right shoulder inflammation. Two days later, Casas was shut down by the Red Sox, ending his rookie season. He batted .263 with 24 home runs and 65 RBI over 132 games. He was subsequently named a finalist for a Silver Slugger Award, and for the American League Rookie of the Year Award.

Casas began the 2024 season as Boston's regular first baseman. Through 22 games, he had six home runs and 10 RBI, then was placed on the injured list on April 21 due to a rib injury. A fractured rib was subsequently diagnosed, with no clear timetable for his return to the team. On April 27, he was transferred to the 60-day injured list. Casas was activated on August 16.

In 2025, Casas got off to a tough start at the plate, slashing .182/.277/.303 with three home runs and 11 RBI in 112 plate appearances. Casas ruptured the patellar tendon in his left knee running to first base on May 2 and was subsequently placed on the injured list on May 3. He was transferred to the 60-day injured list on May 24. Casas missed the remainder of the season as a result of the injury. Former Red Sox pitcher Garrett Richards served as a mentor throughout the early stages of Casas' rehabilitation process.

Casas planned to return to the roster for the 2026 MLB Opening Day game. However, after suffering an intercostal strain during his rehabilitation, Casas was later transferred to the 60-day injured list on April 22, 2026. On August 6, it was announced that Casas had undergone a left wrist arthroscopy.

== International career ==
Casas played on the 18-under United States national baseball team, and was named the Most Valuable Player of the 2017 U-18 Baseball World Cup.

In May 2021, Casas was named to the roster of the United States national baseball team for the qualifiers to the baseball tournament at the 2020 Summer Olympics, contested in 2021 in Tokyo. After the team qualified, he was named to the Olympics roster on July 2. During the tournament, Casas hit home runs against South Korea, Japan, and the Dominican Republic. The team went on to win silver, losing to hosts Japan in the gold medal game.

== Personal life ==
Casas' brother, Gavin, played college baseball as a first baseman for the University of South Carolina Gamecocks during the 2023 and 2024 seasons. He played his freshman and sophomore years for the Vanderbilt Commodores.

During his free time, Casas plays video games, instruments like the piano, and goes fishing for bass.
