= Yushin High School =

Coordinates: 37.283153°N 127.040656°E

Yushin high school

Address
- 216, World cup-ro, Paldal-gu, Suwon-si, Gyeonggi-do, Republic of Korea

Information
- Motto: Based on the Christian spirit of faith, desire, and love, everyone produce talented students who love and serve the country and its people.
- Status: School tree: Silver magnolia School flower: Magnolia; School bird: Eagle
- President: Young-hoo Kim
- Principal: Dong-sub Kim
- Years offered: 1972
- Website: http://www.yushin.or.kr/main.php
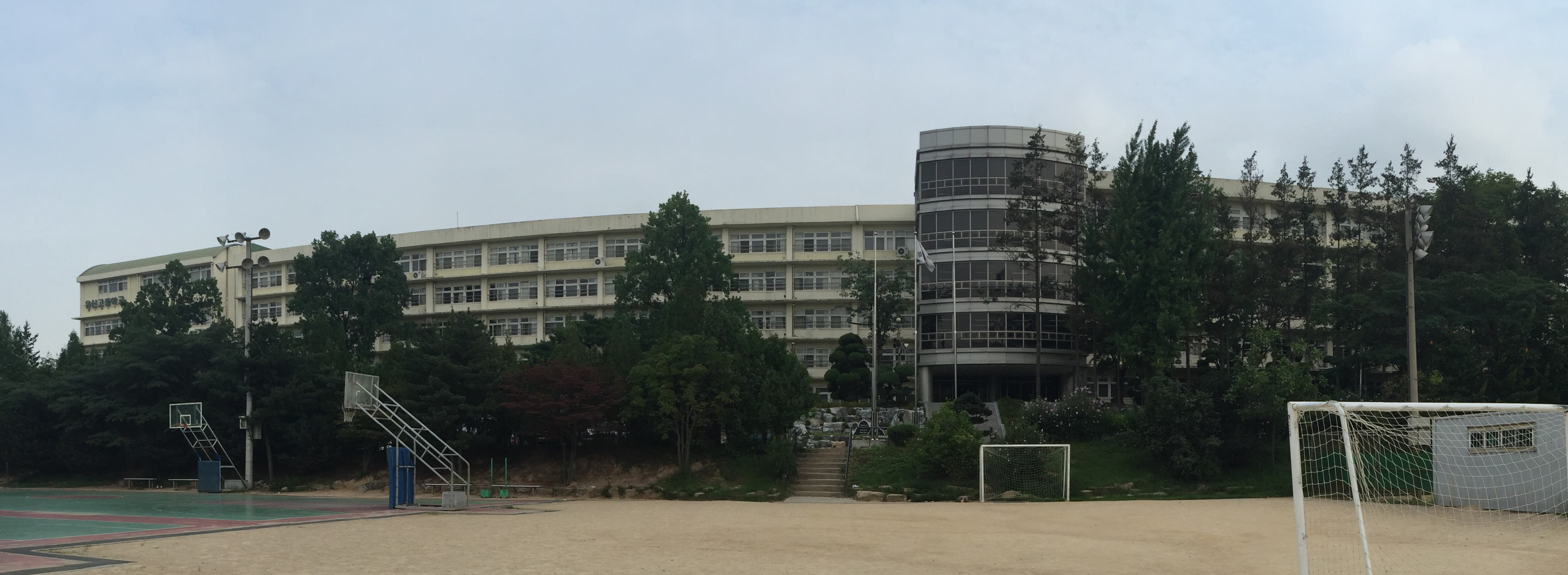

Yushin High School is a private Christian high school located in Wooman-dong, Paldal-gu Suwon, Gyeonggi Province, Republic of Korea.

== School history ==
- The school was founded on March 12, 1973, had its first entrance ceremony and created a soccer team. On July 28, 1972, the school became the initial school for the Yushin Institute. The first president was Chang-won Park. On November 22, 1972, Lee Kyung-Suk became the first principal.
- The first class graduated on January 19, 1976.
- On December 30, 1976, dormitory was completed (343 m^{2}). It was expanded in 1977.
- On May 30, 1978, the library was completed (with a floor space of 991 m^{2}).
- The tennis club started on March 5, 1980, followed by a baseball team on April 14, 1984.
- On May 4, 1984, construction of Hwaseongwan Hall was completed (562 m^{2}).
- On October 30, 1990, the welfare center was completed.
- In 2017, Kim Young-hoo became the fourth chairman of the Yushin Institute.

== Notable alumni ==
- Cho Dae-hyun: Catcher of KT Wiz of the KBO League
- Hong Hyun-bin: Outfielder for the Sangmu Phoenix of the KBO Futures League
