= Park Hyun-min =

South Korean illustrator

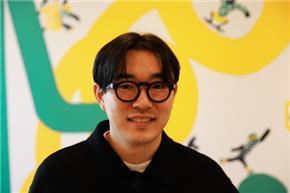
- Born: 1986-5-24 seoul
- Occupation: illustrator, Picture book author
- Language: korean
- Genre: picturebooks

Website
- hyunminpark.net

Park Hyun-min(박현민; born 1986) is a South Korean picture book author and illustrator. “Park” is his last name.

== Life ==
Park Hyun-min was born in Seoul in 1986. He studied structural engineering at the undergraduate and graduate level at Konkuk University. Interested in drawing from an early age, he started creating picture books in earnest after he participated in a picture book workshop. Park made his debut with So Much Snow, a book inspired by Bruno Munari’s and Remy Charlip’s work in which white paper stands in for white snow. He is most interested in frames, and the physicality of the book itself, and his work tends to focus on a book's physical properties. Park likes to present his readers with negative space (the background) in his books, inviting them to fill in the empty space, and rejoices in the playfulness and insight that result from breaking up the framework. His best known-works include So Much Snow, Let’s Play, Finding Light, and City Flight. He currently resides in Gwangjin-gu, Seoul, and creates picture books.

== Career ==
Park's first book, So Much Snow, won a Special Mention in the Opera Prima category at the 2021 Bologna Children's Book Fair, a meaningful award presented to first publications by newly minted picture book artists. The book was also selected as a Korean candidate for the 2023 IBBY Silent Books. He was chosen as a 2022 Illustrator of the Year at the Bologna Children's Book Fair for Flight Over the City, and the book was published the following year. Finding Light (2022) was selected as one of the entries representing Korea for the 2023 Biennial of Illustrations Bratislava, and earned him a nomination as a Shortlisted Illustrator at the 2023 Nami Concours. Let’s Play (2022) was selected for The BRAW Amazing Bookshelf at the 2023 Bologna Children's Book Fair. This exhibit comprises 100 outstanding books from among the entries submitted for the first time that year. Park was also one of 30 winners of the contest for Italian Excellence at the 2023 Bologna Children's Book Fair. In addition to his work on picture books, Park has also collaborated with the apparel brand Benetton Kids to produce illustrations for clothing.

== Style ==
Park Hyun-min's work is characterized by a distinctive visual style that makes good use of empty space. His aim is to let the reader create his or her own story by filling up the empty space by themselves. The swathes of white in So Much Snow calls to mind a snow-covered landscape, whereas the pitch-black spaces in Let’s Play hint at numerous possibilities lurking in the dark.

Park believes that one of the factors that lead each one of us to perceive empty spaces in a certain way is the direction of our gaze. Therefore, he creates depth in his spaces by manipulating the direction of the gaze, by zooming in and out, and framing shots long or low. In Finding Light, he uses silver, gold, and navy hues in composing the cityscape in order to break up the reader's gaze in multiple directions. In City Flight, Park makes the reader follow the point of view of the dandelion by employing not only text but images drawn from a first-person perspective.

Park also manipulates the direction in which his books are flipped in order to change how readers perceive the images. The pages of So Much Snow and Let’s Play are meant to be flipped up, so that the reader's gaze naturally flows downwards, accentuating spatial depth.

== Awards ==
- 2021 Special Mention, Opera Prima category, Bologna Ragazzi Awards - So Much Snow
- 2022 Winner, Bologna Children's Book Fair Illustrators Exhibition - City Flight
- 2023 Selected for The BRAW Amazing Bookshelf, Bologna Children's Book Fair - Let’s Play
- 2023 Nami Concours shortlisted illustrator - Finding Light

== Works ==
- 2020 So Much Snow, Dalgrimm
- 2021 Let’s Play, Dalgrimm
- 2022 Finding Light, Dalgrimm
- 2023 City Flight, Changbi

== Activities ==
- 2022 Bologna Illustrators Exhibition in Japan
- 2022 Itabashi Art Museum (Tokyo), June 25 - August 7, 2022
- 2022 Otani Memorial Art Museum (Hyogo), August 13 – September 25, 2022
- 2022 Nagano Art Museum (Ishikawa), November 3 – December 11, 2022
- 2022 Ota Art Museum and Library (Gunma), December 17, 2022 – January 22, 2023
- 2022 Bologna Illustrators Exhibition in Korea
- 2023 Seoul Art Centre, Hangaram Museum, April 13 – June 25, 2023
- 2023 S/S Fashion collaboration with Benetton Kids
