= National Institute for Mathematical Sciences =

South Korean education organization

- 국가수리과학연구소
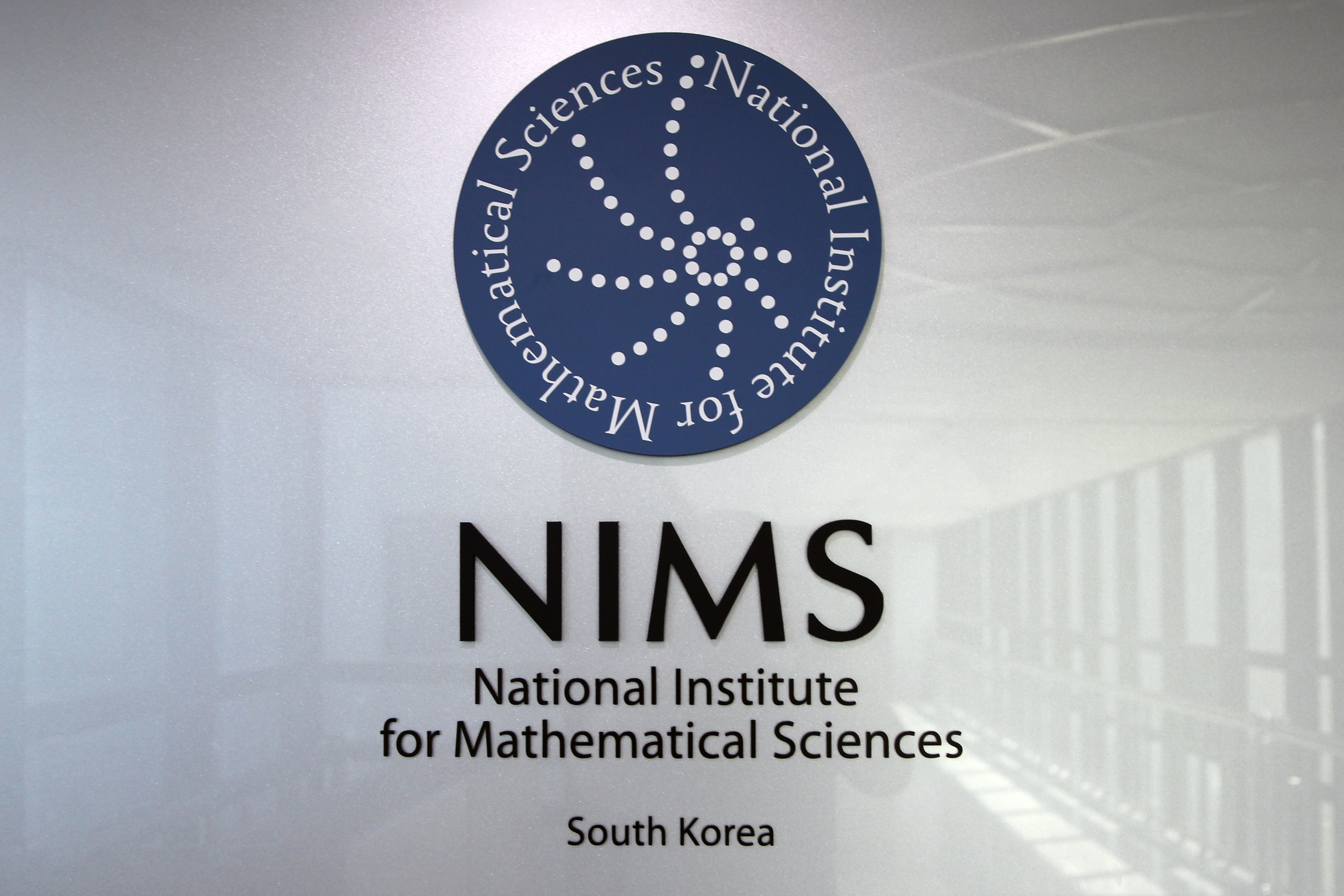
- Formation: October 1, 2005
- Type: Governmental organisation
- Headquarters: Daejeon, South Korea
- Location: 70, Yuseong-daero 1689 beon-gil, Yuseong-gu, Daejeon, South Korea
- Coordinates: 36.401595°N 127.400790°E
- President: Choi Yun Sung
- Website: www.nims.re.kr/eng/

- National Institute for Mathematical Sciences
- Hangul: 국가수리과학연구소
- Hanja: 國家數理科學硏究所
- RR: Gukga suri gwahak yeonguso
- MR: Kukka suri kwahak yŏn'guso

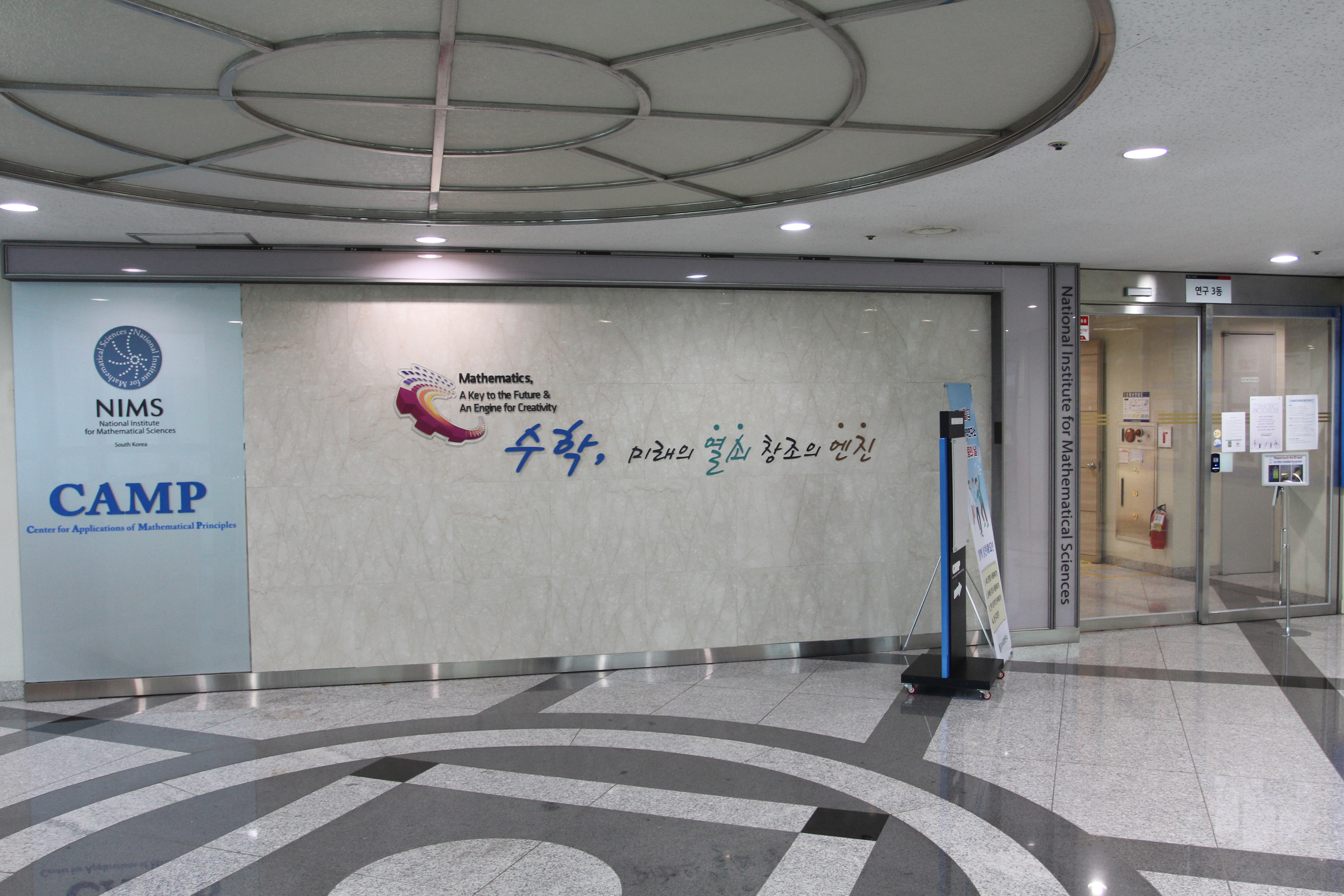
Indoor entrance to NIMS

The National Institute for Mathematical Sciences (NIMS; Korean: 국가수리과학연구소) is a Korean government-funded mathematics research institute. Their work focuses both basic research and applied mathematics with industrial and medical applications.

== History ==
Founded in 2005, NIMS became an affiliated research institute of the Institute for Basic Science in 2012. After delays for multiple years, relocation is planned for late 2023. The vision of NIMS is to "attain a global top 10 competitiveness in industrial mathematics research by 2028". NIMS celebrated its 20th anniversary in 2025.

== Presidents ==
- Cho Yong Seung (October 1, 2005–September 30, 2008)
- Kim Jeong Han (October 17, 2008–August 15, 2011)
- Kim Dong Su (September 11, 2012–September 10, 2015)
- Park Hyung Ju (September 18, 2015–July 6, 2017)
- Chung Soon-yeong (January 30, 2018–January 29, 2021)
- Kim Hyun-Min (March 15, 2021–unclear)
- Choi Yun Sung (January 6, 2025–present)

== See also ==
- Korea Institute for Advanced Study
- List of Institutes of Mathematics
