= Kim Hyun-Min =

South Korean mathematician (born 1966)

PhD Kim Hyun-Min
- 김현민
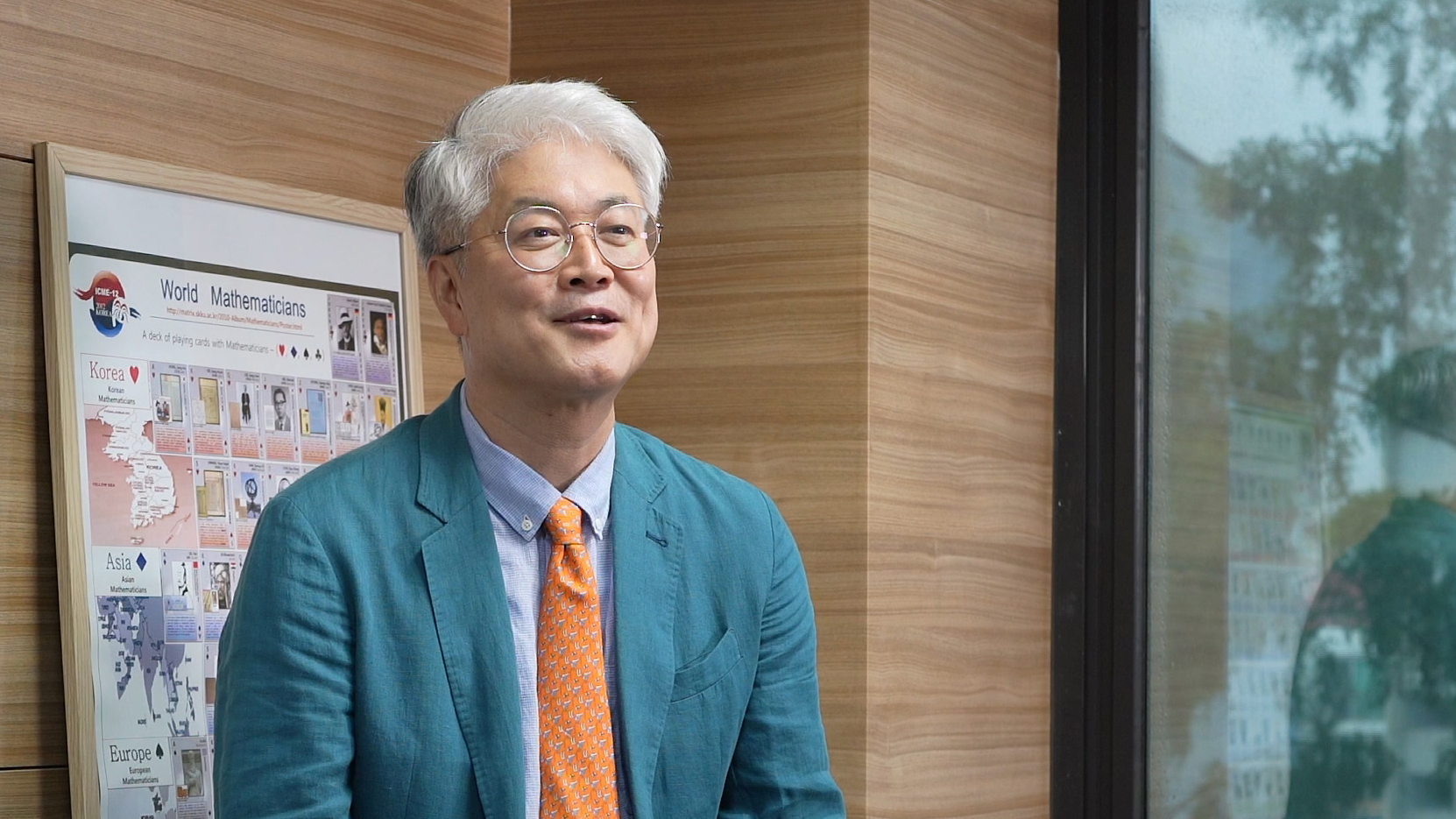
- Born: March 20, 1966 (age 60)
- Citizenship: South Korean
- Education: Ph.D.
- Alma mater: Victoria University of Manchester, Pusan National University
- Scientific career
- Fields: Numerical linear algebra, matrix computations and industrial mathematics
- Institutions: Pusan National University, National Institute for Mathematical Sciences
- Thesis: Numerical Methods for Solving a Quadratic Matrix Equation (2000)
- Doctoral advisor: Nicholas Higham

Korean name
- Hangul: 김현민
- Hanja: 金鉉珉
- RR: Gim Hyeonmin
- MR: Kim Hyŏnmin

Kim Hyun-Min (Korean: 김현민; born March 20, 1966) is a professor in the department of mathematics at Pusan National University among other positions at the university. He has served as vice president of the Korean Mathematical Society; vice president of the Youngnam Mathematical Society; director of the Big Data-based Finance, Fisheries, and Manufacturing Innovation Industrial Mathematics Center; and the sixth president of the National Institute for Mathematical Sciences.

== Education ==
Kim majored in mathematics in the College of Natural Sciences at Pusan National University for his bachelor's and master's. He earned a second master's degree and a doctorate in mathematics specializing in numerical analysis and calculation at the Victoria University of Manchester.

== Career ==
His first position was as a post-doc in the department of mathematics at KAIST. Following that, he taught at Pusan National University and held positions at Kyungpook National University, Samsung Heavy Industries College of Engineering, and the Korean Society for Industrial and Applied Mathematics.

== Research ==
Kim's research is focused on developing algorithms for solving various types of nonlinear matrix equations.

== Scientific society ==
- Member of Society for Industrial and Applied Mathematics
- Member of Korean Mathematical Society
- Member of Korea Society of Industrial Applied Mathematics
- Member of Youngnam Mathematical Society

== Selected publications ==
- Jie Meng; Seo Sang-Hyup; Kim Hyun-Min (2018). "Condition Numbers and Backward Error of a Matrix Polynomial Equation Arising in Stochastic Models". Journal of Scientific Computing. 76 (2): 759–776. doi:10.1007/s10915-018-0641-x. S2CID 254704825.
- Kim Young-Jin; Kim Hyun-Min (2016). "Diagonal update method for a quadratic matrix equation". Applied Mathematics and Computation. 283: 208–215. doi:10.1016/j.amc.2016.02.016.
- Seo Jong-Hyeon; Kim Hyun-Min (2014). "Convergence of pure and relaxed Newton methods for solving a matrix polynomial equation arising in stochastic models". Linear Algebra and Its Applications. 440: 34–49. doi:10.1016/j.laa.2013.10.043.
- Nicholas Higham; Kim Hyun-Min (2001). "Solving a quadratic matrix equation by Newton's method with exact line searches" (PDF). SIAM Journal on Matrix Analysis and Applications. 23 (2): 303–316. doi:10.1137/S0895479899350976.
- Nicholas Higham; Kim Hyun-Min (2000). "Numerical Analysis of a Quadratic Matrix Equation". IMA Journal of Numerical Analysis. 20 (4): 499–519. doi:10.1093/imanum/20.4.499.
