= Fuzzy logic (disambiguation) =

Fuzzy logic is a form of logic theory.

Fuzzy Logic may also refer to:

- Fuzzy Logic (Super Furry Animals album)
- Fuzzy Logic (David Benoit album)
- Fuzzy Logic, a 2013 album by Jerry Paper
- "Buttercrush / Fuzzy Logic", an episode of The Powerpuff Girls

== See also ==
- Fuzzy Logic Recordings, a Canadian independent record label
