= Nicaragua national under-18 baseball team =

Nicaragua Baseball U-18

Information
- Country: Nicaragua
- Confederation: WBSC Americas

WBSC ranking
- Current: NR (5 August 2025)

The Nicaragua national under-18 baseball team is the national under-18 team representing Nicaragua in international baseball competitions. The organization is currently unranked in the world by the World Baseball Softball Confederation. They compete in the bi-annual U-18 Baseball World Cup.

== See also ==
- Nicaragua national baseball team
- U-18 Baseball World Cup
