= Institute of Applied Physics and Computational Mathematics =

Chinese nuclear weapons research center

Coordinates: 40.072°N 116.257°E

- Parent organization: China Academy of Engineering Physics
- Website: www.iapcm.ac.cn

The Institute of Applied Physics and Computational Mathematics (IAPCM) was established in 1958 in Beijing in the People's Republic of China. The institution conducts research on nuclear warhead design computations for the China Academy of Engineering Physics (CAEP) in Mianyang, Sichuan and focuses on applied theoretical research and on the study of fundamental theories. Its main research fields include: Theoretical physics, nuclear fusion, plasma physics, nuclear physics, atomic molecular physics, laser physics, fluid dynamics, applied mathematics, and arms control science and technology.

The Federal Bureau of Investigation has stated that IAPCM has targeted U.S. defense labs for industrial espionage.

From August 2012, the director of the institute was LI Hua.

== See also ==
- Nuclear weapons of China
