= Korean Mathematical Society =

Association of professional mathematicians

- Formation: October 1946; 80 years ago
- Headquarters: Korea Institute of Science and Technology Center, Building 1, 1109-ho, 22 Teheran-ro 7-gil, Gangnam District, Seoul, South Korea
- Coordinates: 37.500702°N 127.030745°E
- President: Kwak Si-jong
- Website: www.kms.or.kr/eng

- Korean Mathematical Society
- Hangul: 대한수학회
- Hanja: 大韓數學會
- RR: Daehan suhakhoe
- MR: Taehan suhakhoe

The Korean Mathematical Society (KMS; Korean: 대한수학회) is an academic organization in South Korea. Originally founded as the Korean Society of Mathematics and Physics, their name changed during their relaunch in 1952. Their stated goal is to promote mathematics in South Korea. The Society publishes the Journal of the Korean Mathematical Society, Bulletin of the Korean Mathematical Society, and Communications of the Korean Mathematical Society. They became a large associate member of the International Council for Industrial and Applied Mathematics in 2015.

== KIMS Presidents ==
- Choi Yoon-sik (최윤식; October 1946–October 1962)
- Jang Gi-won (장기원; October 1962–October 1967)
- Bak Gyeong-chan (박경찬; October 1967–October 1970)
- Kim Jeong-su (김정수; October 1970–October 1974)
- Bak Eul-ryong (박을룡; October 1974–October 1980)
- Kwon Tae-kyeon (권택연; October 1980–October 1982)
- Bak Se-hui (박세희; October 1982–October 1984)
- Jo Tae-geun (조태근; October 1984–October 1986)
- Im Jeong-dae (임정대; October 1986–October 1988)
- Yun Jae-han (윤재한; October 1988–January 1991)
- Kim Jong-sik (김종식; January 1991–January 1993)
- U Mu-ha (우무하; January 1993–January 1995)
- Ju Jin-gu (주진구; January 1995–January 1997)
- Jang Geon-su (장건수; January 1997–January 1999)
- Kim Seong-gi (김성기; January 1999–February 2001)
- Jeong Dong-myeong (정동명; February 2001–January 2003)
- Yong Seung Cho (조용승; January 2003–January 2005)
- Min Gyeong-chan (민경찬; January 2005–January 2007)
- Kim Do-han (김도한; January 2007–January 2011) 19th and 20th
- Seo Dong-yeop (서동엽; January 2011–January 2013)
- Kim Myeong-hwan (김명환; January 2013–January 2015)
- Lee Yong-hun (이용훈; January 2015–January 2017)
- Lee Hyang-sook (이향숙; January 2017–January 2019)
- Keum Jong-hae (금종해; January 2019–January 2023) 25th and 26th
- Park Jong-il (박종일; January 2023–January 2025)
- Kwak Si-jong (곽시종; January 2025–Current)

== See also ==
- National Academy of Sciences of the Republic of Korea
