= 2018 Korean Series =

Team (Wins)	Managers	Season
SK Wyverns (4)	Trey Hillman	78–65–1
Doosan Bears (2)	Kim Tae-hyoung	93–51–0
- Dates: November 4 – November 12
- MVP: Han Dong-min

Broadcast
- Television: SBS (Game 1, 4); MBC (Game 2, 5); KBS2 (Game 3, 6)

The 2018 Korean Series is the championship series of the 2018 KBO League season. The Doosan Bears, as the regular season champions, automatically advanced to the Korean Series, where they faced the SK Wyverns. The series ran from November 4 to November 12.

The Wyverns defeated Doosan, four games to two. Han Dong-min won the Korean Series Most Valuable Player Award.

== Background ==
The Doosan Bears won the 2015 and 2016 Korean Series. They lost the 2017 Korean Series to the Kia Tigers. Doosan had the best winning percentage during the 2018 KBO League season, advancing directly to the Korean Series. The team with the regular season's best record has won 15 of the previous 16 Korean Series.

The Bears faced the SK Wyverns, who last won the Korean Series in 2010. The Wyverns finished the regular season with the second-best record in the league, 14 1/2 games behind Doosan. They advanced to the playoff round. The Wyverns defeated the Nexen Heroes in the KBO League playoffs to reach the Korean Series.

== Summary ==
SK Wyverns won the series, 4–2.

Game	Date	Score	Location	Time	Attendance
1	November 4	SK Wyverns – 7, Doosan Bears – 3	Jamsil Baseball Stadium	3:17	25,000
2	November 5	SK Wyverns – 3, Doosan Bears – 7	Jamsil Baseball Stadium	3:14	25,000
3	November 7	Doosan Bears – 2, SK Wyverns – 7	Munhak Baseball Stadium	3:13	25,000
4	November 9	Doosan Bears – 2, SK Wyverns – 1	Munhak Baseball Stadium	2:54	25,000
5	November 10	Doosan Bears – 1, SK Wyverns – 4	Munhak Baseball Stadium	3:08	25,000
6	November 12	SK Wyverns – 5, Doosan Bears – 4 (13)	Jamsil Baseball Stadium	4:30	25,000

== Matchups ==
=== Game 1 ===
November 4, 2018 14:00 KST at Jamsil Baseball Stadium
Team	1	2	3	4	5	6	7	8	9	R	H	E
SK Wyverns	2	0	0	0	0	2	1	0	2	7	7	0
Doosan Bears	0	0	1	0	2	0	0	0	0	3	7	1
WP: Ángel Sánchez (1–0) LP: Josh Lindblom (0–1); Home runs: SK: Han Dong-min (1), Park Jung-kwon (1); DOO: None; Attendance: 25,000; Boxscore

Josh Lindblom started Game 1 for Doosan, while Park Jong-hoon started for the Wyverns. For the Wyverns, Han Dong-min hit a two-run home run in the first inning, and Park Jung-kwon hit a two-run home run in the sixth inning. Choi Joo-hwan had all three runs batted in for Doosan. Ángel Sánchez earned the win in relief for the Wyverns while Lindblom took the loss for Doosan.

=== Game 2 ===
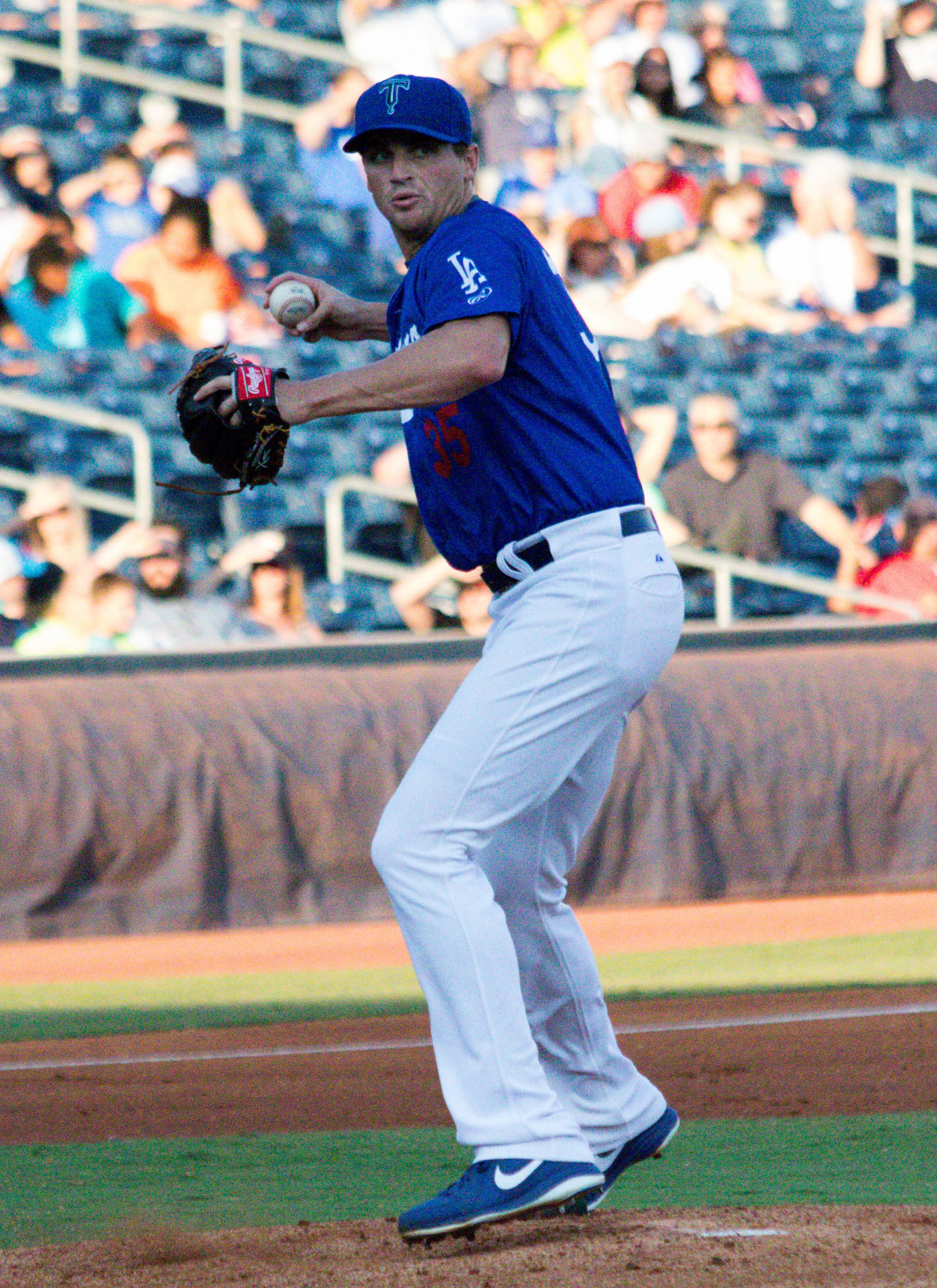
Seth Frankoff earned the win in Game 2.

November 5, 2018 18:30 KST at Jamsil Baseball Stadium
Team	1	2	3	4	5	6	7	8	9	R	H	E
SK Wyverns	0	0	0	0	1	0	2	0	0	3	6	1
Doosan Bears	0	0	1	3	0	0	0	3	X	7	11	2
WP: Seth Frankoff (1–0) LP: Moon Seung-won (0–1) Sv: Ham Deok-ju (1); Home runs: SK: None; DOO: Choi Joo-hwan (1); Attendance: 25,000; Boxscore

Seth Frankoff started Game 2 for Doosan. He had ten strikeouts in 6 2/3 innings, earning the win. Moon Seung-won started for the Wyverns. Doosan's Choi Joo-hwan hit a two-run home run and recorded a third RBI in the eighth inning. Kim Kang-min drove in all three runs for the Wyverns.

=== Game 3 ===
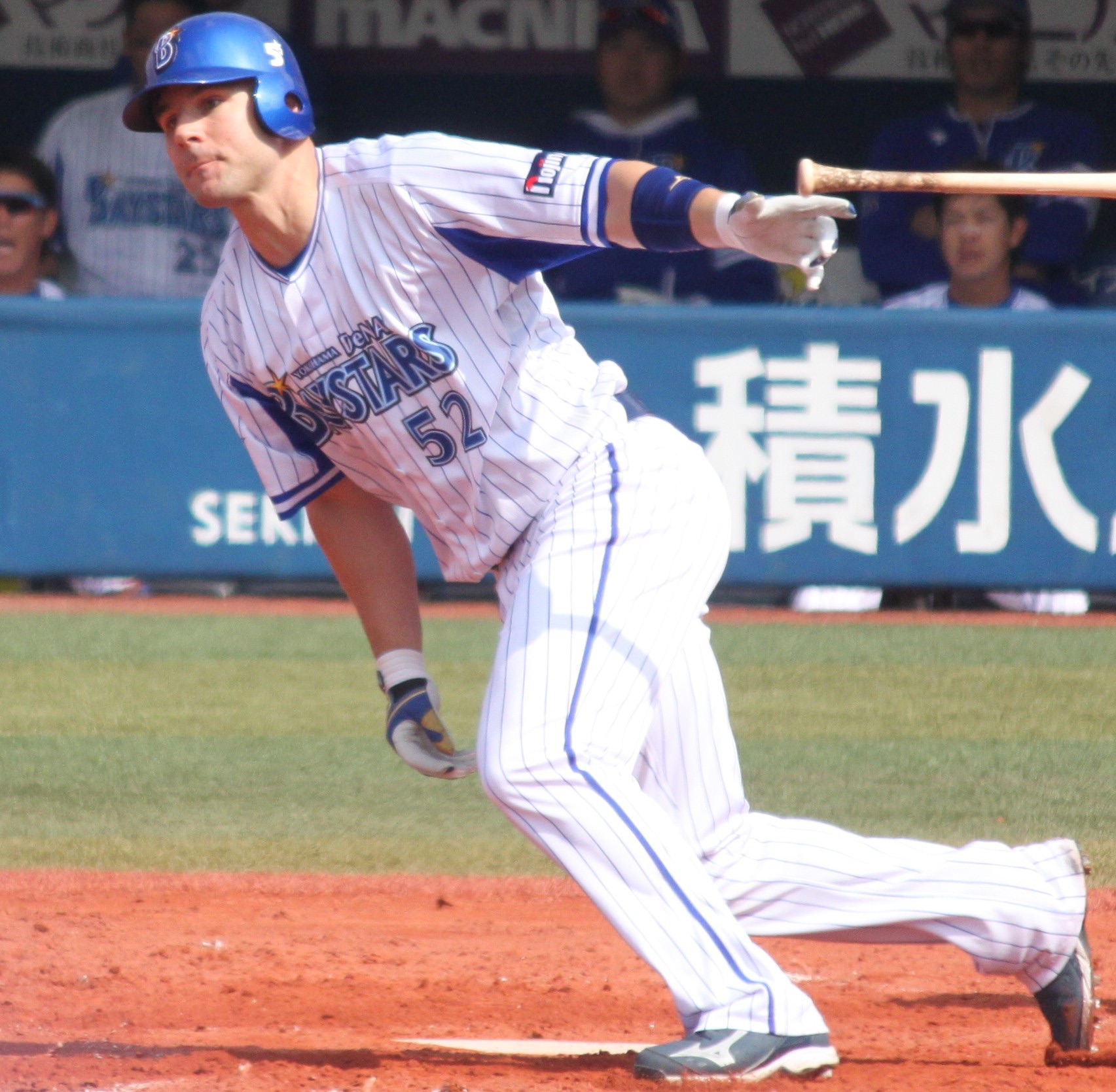
Jamie Romak hit two home runs for the Wyverns in Game 3.

November 7, 2018 18:30 KST at Munhak Baseball Stadium
Team	1	2	3	4	5	6	7	8	9	R	H	E
Doosan Bears	0	0	0	0	2	0	0	0	0	2	8	2
SK Wyverns	3	1	0	0	0	0	0	3	X	7	11	2
WP: Merrill Kelly (1–0) LP: Lee Yong-chan (0–1); Home runs: DOO: None; SK: Jamie Romak 2 (2), Lee Jae-won (1); Attendance: 25,000; Boxscore

The series continued with the first of three games at Munhak Baseball Stadium. Jamie Romak hit two home runs for the Wyverns, and Lee Jae-won also hit a home run. Merrill Kelly pitched seven innings allowing two runs to earn the win.

=== Game 4 ===
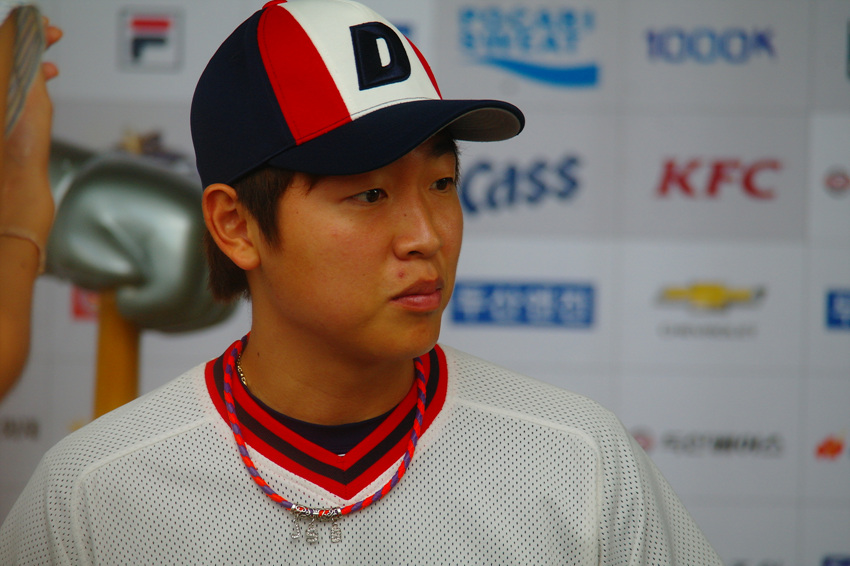
Jung Soo-bin hit a two-run home run to win the game for Doosan.

November 9, 2018 18:30 KST at Munhak Baseball Stadium
Team	1	2	3	4	5	6	7	8	9	R	H	E
Doosan Bears	0	0	0	0	0	0	0	2	0	2	11	0
SK Wyverns	0	0	1	0	0	0	0	0	0	1	4	1
WP: Josh Lindblom (1–1) LP: Ángel Sánchez (1–1) Sv: Ham Deok-ju (2); Home runs: DOO: Jung Soo-bin (1); SK: None; Boxscore

The Wyverns scored first when Kim Kang-min hit an RBI single to score Kim Sung-hyun in the third inning. In the eighth inning, Jung Soo-bin hit a two-run home run to give Doosan the lead, which they hung on to win and tie the series at two all.

=== Game 5 ===
November 10, 2018 14:00 KST at Munhak Baseball Stadium
Team	1	2	3	4	5	6	7	8	9	R	H	E
Doosan Bears	0	0	1	0	0	0	0	0	0	1	8	2
SK Wyverns	0	0	0	0	0	0	2	2	X	4	7	0
WP: Kim Tae-hoon (1–0) LP: Seth Frankoff (1–1) Sv: Jung Young-il (1); Home runs: DOO: Jung Jin-ho (1); SK: None; Boxscore

Doosan scored their only run in Game 5 with a solo home run by Jung Jin-ho in the third inning. In the seventh inning, Kim Sung-hyun tied the game at 1–1 with an RBI double, and Kim Kang-min hit an RBI sacrifice fly to give the Wyverns a 2–1 lead. The next inning, Park Jung-kwon had an RBI single and Kim Sung-hyun drew a walk with the bases-loaded to expand the lead to 4–1.

=== Game 6 ===
November 12, 2018 18:30 KST at Jamsil Baseball Stadium
Team	1	2	3	4	5	6	7	8	9	10	11	12	13	R	H	E
SK Wyverns	1	0	0	2	0	0	0	0	1	0	0	0	1	5	10	0
Doosan Bears	0	0	0	0	0	3	0	1	0	0	0	0	0	4	8	0
WP: Moon Seung-won (1–1) LP: Yoo Hee-kwan (0–1) Sv: Kim Kwang-hyun (1); Home runs: SK: Kang Seung-ho (1), Choi Jeong (1), Han Dong-min (2); DOO: None; Boxscore

Lee Yong-chan, Doosan's starting pitcher, walked the first three Wyverns batters to load the bases. The Wyverns scored one run in the first inning with an RBI groundout by Jamie Romak. Kang Seung-ho hit a two-run home run for the Wyverns in the fourth inning to give them a 3–0 lead. Wyverns' starting pitcher Merrill Kelly did not allow a hit for the first 5 1/3 innings, but Doosan scored three runs in the sixth inning on an RBI double by Choi Joo-hwan and a two RBI single by Yang Eui-ji. Yang added a third RBI with a sacrifice fly in the eighth inning to give Doosan a 4–3 lead. In the top of the ninth inning, Choi Jeong hit a game-tying home run for the Wyverns, and the game went into extra innings. Han Dong-min hit a home run for the Wyverns in the top of the thirteenth inning, and Kim Kwang-hyun, the Wyverns' ace starting pitcher, earned the save by pitching a scoreless inning in the bottom of the thirteenth to win the title for the Wyverns. The final out was made by strike out, which gave Park Kun Woo golden sombrero. Han won the Korean Series Most Valuable Player Award.

=== Composite line score ===
2018 Korean Series (4–2): SK Wyverns beat Doosan Bears.

Team	1	2	3	4	5	6	7	8	9	10	11	12	13	R	H	E
SK Wyverns	6	1	1	2	1	2	5	5	3	0	0	0	1	27	45	4
Doosan Bears	0	0	3	3	4	3	0	6	0	0	0	0	0	19	53	7
Home runs: SK: Han Dong-min (2), Jamie Romak (2), Lee Jae-won (1), Choi Jeong (1), Park Jung-kwon (1), Kang Seung-ho (1); DOO: Jung Jin-ho (1), Choi Joo-hwan (1), Jung Soo-bin (1); Total attendance: 150,000 Average attendance: 25,000; Winning player's share: ₩TBA. Losing player's share: ₩TBA.

== See also ==
- 2018 Japan Series
- 2018 World Series
