= 2010 Korea Professional Baseball season =

CJ Magumagu Pro Baseball 2010
- Logo of CJ Magu Magu 2010 Pro Baseball Season
- League: Korea Professional Baseball
- Sport: Baseball
- Duration: 27 March 2010 – 26 September 2010
- Games: 133 per team
- Teams: 8

2010 Korea Professional Baseball Draft

Regular Season
- Season champions: SK Wyverns
- Season MVP: Lee Dae-Ho (Lotte)

League Postseason
- Semiplayoff champions: Doosan Bears
- Semiplayoff runners-up: Lotte Giants
- Playoff champions: Samsung Lions
- Playoff runners-up: Doosan Bears

Korean Series
- Champions: SK Wyverns
- Runners-up: Samsung Lions
- Finals MVP: Park Jung-kwon (SK)

KBO seasons
- ← 2009 2011 →

The 2010 Korea Professional Baseball season was the 29th season in the history of the Korea Professional Baseball. The SK Wyverns won the regular season and the Korean Series.

== Format ==
=== Season format ===
- Regular season: 133 games for each team
- Semiplayoff: regular-season 3rd place vs. regular-season 4th place – best of 5
- Playoff: regular-season 2nd place vs. semiplayoff winner – Best of 5
- Korean Series: regular-season 1st place vs. playoff winner – Best of 7

=== To determine the final standings ===
- Champion (1st place): Korean Series winner
- Runner-up (2nd place): Korean Series loser
- 3rd–8th place: Sort by Regular-season record except teams to play in the Korean Series

== Regular season ==
Rank	Team	GP	W	D	L	Pct.
1	SK Wyverns	133	84	2	47	0.632
2	Samsung Lions	133	79	2	52	0.594
3	Doosan Bears	133	73	3	57	0.549
4	Lotte Giants	133	69	3	61	0.519
5	Kia Tigers	133	59	0	74	0.444
6	LG Twins	133	57	5	71	0.429
7	Nexen Heroes	133	52	3	78	0.391
8	Hanwha Eagles	133	49	2	82	0.368

Pennant Race winner

SK Wyverns

== Post-Season ==
=== Semiplayoff ===
Doosan Bears won the series, 3–2.

Game	Date	Score	Location	Time	Attendance
1	29 September 2010	Doosan Bears – 5, Lotte Giants – 10	Seoul	-	-
2	30 September 2010	Doosan Bears – 1, Lotte Giants – 4	Seoul	-	-
3	2 October 2010	Lotte Giants – 5, Doosan Bears – 6	Busan	-	-
4	3 October 2010	Lotte Giants – 4, Doosan Bears – 11	Busan	-	-
5	5 October 2010	Doosan Bears – 11, Lotte Giants – 4	Seoul	-	-

=== Playoff ===
Samsung Lions won the series, 3–2.

Game	Date	Score	Location	Time	Attendance
1	7 October 2010	Samsung Lions – 6, Doosan Bears – 5	Daegu	-	-
2	8 October 2010	Samsung Lions – 3, Doosan Bears – 4	Daegu	-	-
3	10 October 2010	Doosan Bears – 9, Samsung Lions – 8 (11th inning)	Seoul	-	-
4	11 October 2010	Doosan Bears – 7, Samsung Lions – 8	Seoul	-	-
5	13 October 2010	Samsung Lions – 6, Doosan Bears – 5 (11th inning)	Daegu	-	-

=== Korean Series (Championship) ===
SK Wyverns won the series, 4–0.

Game	Date	Score	Location	Time	Attendance
1	15 October 2010	SK Wyverns (9–5) Samsung Lions	Munhak Baseball Stadium, Incheon	6:00 PM	-
2	16 October 2010	SK Wyverns (4–1) Samsung Lions	Munhak Baseball Stadium, Incheon	2:00 PM	-
3	18 October 2010	Samsung Lions (2–4) SK Wyverns	Daegu Baseball Stadium, Daegu	6:00 PM	-
4	19 October 2010	Samsung Lions (2–4) SK Wyverns	Daegu Baseball Stadium, Daegu	6:00 PM	-

2010 Korean Series Winner

SK Wyverns
Third title

== Foreign hitters ==
Team	Player	Position	In KBO since	Batting Average	Home runs	RBI	Notes
Doosan Bears	NONE	N/A					
Hanwha Eagles	NONE	N/A					
Kia Tigers	NONE	N/A					
LG Twins	NONE	N/A					
Lotte Giants	Karim García	OF	2008	.253	26	83	
Nexen Heroes	Doug Clark	OF	2008	.265	12	50	
Samsung Lions	NONE	N/A					
SK Wyverns	NONE	N/A					
