= Lee Bo-geun =

South Korean baseball player

Kiwoom Heroes – No. 47
- Pitcher
- Born: April 30, 1986 (age 39); Seoul
- Bats: Right Throws: Right

KBO debut
- April 27, 2005, for the Hyundai Unicorns

KBO statistics (through July 28, 2019)
- Win–loss record: 35–38
- Earned run average: 4.56
- Strikeouts: 417
- Holds: 84
- Saves: 15
- Stats at Baseball Reference

Teams
- Hyundai Unicorns (2005–2007); Woori/Nexen/Kiwoom Heroes (2008–2013, 2016–present)

- Lee Bo-geun
- Hangul: 이보근
- Hanja: 李輔根
- RR: I Bogeun
- MR: I Pogŭn

Lee Bo-geun (born April 30, 1986) is a South Korean professional baseball pitcher currently playing for the Kiwoom Heroes of the KBO League.
