= Jung Jin-ho =

Jung Jin-ho may refer to:

- Jung Jin-ho (handballer)
- Jung Jin-ho (baseball)
- Jeong Jin-ho, footballer
