= Han Yoo-seom =

South Korean baseball player

SSG Landers – No. 35
- Outfielder
- Born: August 9, 1989 (age 36); Busan, South Korea
- Bats: Left Throws: Right

KBO debut
- May 3, 2012, for the SK Wyverns

KBO statistics (through 2025)
- Batting average: .268
- Home runs: 212
- Runs batted in: 755

Teams
- SK Wyverns / SSG Landers (2012–present); Police Baseball Team (2014–2016)

Career highlights and awards
- Korean Series champion and MVP in 2018

Han Yoo-seom (formerly Han Dong-min; born August 9, 1989, in Busan) is a South Korean outfielder who plays for the SSG Landers in the Korea Baseball Organization. He bats left-handed and throws right-handed.

== Amateur career ==
As a junior at Kyungsung University in Busan, Han was named KBA Best Collegiate Hitter, batting .348 (32-for 92) with 23 RBI and 3 home runs in the 2010 season. In 2011, Han got his first call-up to the South Korea national baseball team and competed at the 2011 Baseball World Cup in Panama, as a center fielder. He hit a single off Eliecer Navarro of Panama in Round 2 but struggled at the plate during the tourney, going 1-for-9.

=== Notable international careers ===
Year	Venue	Competition	Team	Individual Note
2011	Panama	Baseball World Cup	6th	.111 BA (1-for-9), 2 R, 3 BB

== Professional career ==
Due to his disappointing senior campaign in the first half of the 2011 collegiate season, Han was drafted in the 9th round (81st overall) in the 2012 KBO Entry Draft by the SK Wyverns. However, Han was called up to the Wyvern's 26-man first team roster in May which was the earliest first league promotion amongst the rookie position players of the 2012 season. He played in only one game before being demoted back to the second team in the same month. In July Han came back to the first team and played in six games going 2 for 6 with one run as a pinch hitter. However, Han was placed on the disabled list on July 27 due to a sprained ligament in finger after sliding headfirst at first base, and spent the rest of his season in the second team.

Han won the Korean Series Most Valuable Player Award for the 2018 Korean Series.
