= Youm Kyoung-youb =

South Korean baseball player and manager

LG Twins – No. 85
- Infielder / Manager
- Born: March 1, 1968 (age 58); Gwangju, South Korea
- Batted: Right Threw: Right

KBO debut
- 1991, for the Pacific Dolphins

Last appearance
- 2000, for the Hyundai Unicorns

KBO statistics
- Batting average: .195
- Home runs: 5
- Runs batted in: 110
- Stats at Baseball Reference

Teams
- As player: Pacific Dolphins / Hyundai Unicorns (1991–2000); As coach: Hyundai Unicorns (2007); LG Twins (2010–2011); Nexen Heroes (2012); San Diego Padres (2021); As manager: Nexen Heroes (2013–2016); SK Wyverns (2019–2020); LG Twins (2022–present); Other: Pacific Dolphins / Hyundai Unicorns Operation Manager (2001–2006); LG Twins Scout (2008); LG Twins Operation Manager (2009); SK Wyverns General Manager (2017–2018); KBS N Sports Baseball Commentator (2022)

Career highlights and awards
- As player: 2x Korean Series champion (1998, 2000); As general manager: Korean Series champion (2018); As manager: 2x Korean Series champion (2023, 2025); 2x Korean Series manager of the year (2023, 2025); KBO Golden Glove Award (2025)

- Youm Kyoung-youb
- Hangul: 염경엽
- Hanja: 廉京燁
- RR: Yeom Gyeongyeop
- MR: Yŏm Kyŏngyŏp

Youm Kyoung-youb (born March 1, 1968) is a South Korean former baseball player and the current manager of the KBO League team LG Twins. He previously managed the Nexen Heroes and the SK Wyverns.

Youm played in the KBO from 1991 to 2000 for the Pacific Dolphins / Hyundai Unicorns franchise.

== Managerial career ==
On June 25, 2020, during his second season as manager of the SK Wyverns, Youm collapsed in the dugout during a game. The 2020 season had been a rough one for the Wyverns, with a ten-game losing streak and an eight-game losing streak just in the first part of the year.

On November 6, 2022, he was hired as the new manager of the LG Twins on a three-year contract.

In 2023, he led the LG Twins to their first KBO championship in 29 years. In 2025, he led the Twins to another title. On November 9, 2025, LG re-signed him for up to 3 billion won for three years.
