= 2018 KBO League season =

2018 KBO League
- League: KBO League
- Sport: Baseball
- Duration: March 24 – October 14
- Number of games: 144 per team
- Number of teams: 10
- Total attendance: 8,073,742

Regular Season
- Season champions: Doosan Bears
- Season MVP: Kim Jae-hwan (Doosan)

Postseason
- Wild Card champions: Nexen Heroes
- Wild Card runners-up: KIA Tigers
- Semi-playoffs champions: Nexen Heroes
- Semi-playoffs runners-up: Hanwha Eagles
- Playoffs champions: SK Wyverns
- Playoffs runners-up: Nexen Heroes

Korean Series
- Champions: SK Wyverns
- Runners-up: Doosan Bears
- Finals MVP: Han Dong-min (SK)

KBO League seasons
- ← 2017 2019 →

The 2018 KBO League season was the 37th season in the history of the KBO League.

== Standings ==
Rank	Team	W	L	D	Pct.	GB	Postseason
1	Doosan Bears	93	51	0	.646	–	Korean Series
2	SK Wyverns	78	65	1	.545	14.5	Playoff
3	Hanwha Eagles	77	67	0	.535	16.0	Semi-playoff
4	Nexen Heroes	75	69	0	.521	18.0	Wild Card
5	KIA Tigers	70	74	0	.486	23.0	Wild Card
6	Samsung Lions	68	72	4	.486	23.0	Did not qualify
7	Lotte Giants	68	74	2	.479	24.0	Did not qualify
8	LG Twins	67	75	1	.472	24.5	Did not qualify
9	KT Wiz	59	82	3	.420	32.5	Did not qualify
10	NC Dinos	58	85	1	.406	34.5	Did not qualify

== League Leaders ==
Batting leaders
Stat	Player	Team	Total
Batting average	Kim Hyun-soo	LG Twins	.362
Home runs	Kim Jae-hwan	Doosan Bears	44
Runs batted in	Kim Jae-hwan	Doosan Bears	133
Runs	Jeon Jun-woo	Lotte Giants	118
Hits	Jeon Jun-woo	Lotte Giants	190
Stolen Base	Park Hae-min	Samsung Lions	36
On Base Percentage	Park Byung-ho	Nexen Heroes	.460
Slugging Percentage	Park Byung-ho	Nexen Heroes	.718

Pitching leaders
Stat	Player	Team	Total
Earned run average	Josh Lindblom	Doosan Bears	2.88
Wins	Seth Frankoff	Doosan Bears	18
Saves	Jung Woo-ram	Hanwha Eagles	35
Holds	Oh Hyoun-Taek	Lotte Giants	25
Innings Pitched	Jake Brigham	Nexen Heroes	199
Winning percentage	Seth Frankoff	Doosan Bears	.857
Strikeouts	Keyvius Sampson	Hanwha Eagles	195
WHIP	Josh Lindblom	Doosan Bears	1.07

== Foreign players ==
Each team can sign up to three foreign players. Due to the high proportion of pitchers signed in previous years, beginning in 2014 the league has mandated that at least one of the foreign players must be a position player.

Team	Player	Position	In KBO since	Salary	Notes
Samsung Lions	Tim Adleman	Pitcher	2018	$1,050,000	
Samsung Lions	Lisalverto Bonilla	Pitcher	2018	$700,000	
Samsung Lions	Darin Ruf	Infielder	2017	$1,500,000	
NC Dinos	Logan Verrett	Pitcher	2018	$800,000	
NC Dinos	Wei-Chung Wang	Pitcher	2018	$900,000	
NC Dinos	Xavier Scruggs	Infielder	2017	$1,300,000	
Doosan Bears	Seth Frankoff	Pitcher	2018	$850,000	
Doosan Bears	Josh Lindblom	Pitcher	2015	$1,450,000	
Doosan Bears	Jimmy Paredes	Infielder	2018	$800,000	Released
Doosan Bears	Scott Van Slyke	Outfielder	2018	$320,000	Mid-season signing
Nexen Heroes	Esmil Rogers	Pitcher	2015	$1,500,000	Released
Nexen Heroes	Jake Brigham	Pitcher	2017	$650,000	
Nexen Heroes	Michael Choice	Outfielder	2017	$600,000	Released
Nexen Heroes	Eric Hacker	Pitcher	2013	$300,000	Mid-season signing
Nexen Heroes	Jerry Sands	Outfielder	2018	$100,000	Mid-season signing
SK Wyverns	Merrill Kelly	Pitcher	2015	$1,750,000	
SK Wyverns	Ángel Sánchez	Pitcher	2018	$1,100,000	
SK Wyverns	Jamie Romak	Infielder	2017	$850,000	
Hanwha Eagles	Keyvius Sampson	Pitcher	2018	$700,000	
Hanwha Eagles	Jason Wheeler	Pitcher	2018	$575,000	Released
Hanwha Eagles	Jared Hoying	Outfielder	2018	$700,000	
Hanwha Eagles	David Hale	Pitcher	2018	$500,000	Mid-season signing
Kia Tigers	Héctor Noesí	Pitcher	2016	$2,000,000	
Kia Tigers	Pat Dean	Pitcher	2017	$925,000	
Kia Tigers	Roger Bernadina	Outfielder	2017	$1,100,000	
Lotte Giants	Brooks Raley	Pitcher	2015	$1,170,000	
Lotte Giants	Félix Doubront	Pitcher	2018	$1,000,000	
Lotte Giants	Andy Burns	Infielder	2017	$730,000	
LG Twins	Henry Sosa	Pitcher	2012	$1,200,000	
LG Twins	Tyler Wilson	Pitcher	2018	$800,000	
LG Twins	Adonis García	Infielder	2018	$800,000	
KT Wiz	Ryan Feierabend	Pitcher	2015	$1,050,000	
KT Wiz	Dustin Nippert	Pitcher	2011	$1,000,000	
KT Wiz	Mel Rojas Jr.	Outfielder	2017	$1,000,000	

=== Foreign hitters ===
Team	Player	Batting Average	Home Runs	RBI	Notes
Doosan Bears	Jimmy Paredes	.138	1	4	Released by the team
Doosan Bears	Scott Van Slyke	.128	1	4	Signed to replace Jimmy Paredes
Hanwha Eagles	Jared Hoying	.306	30	110	
Kia Tigers	Roger Bernadina	.315	20	70	
KT Wiz	Mel Rojas Jr.	.305	43	114	
LG Twins	Adonis Garcia	.339	8	34	
Lotte Giants	Andy Burns	.303	15	57	
NC Dinos	Xavier Scruggs	.257	26	97	
Nexen Heroes	Michael Choice	.258	17	61	Released by the team
Nexen Heroes	Jerry Sands	.314	12	37	Signed to replace Michael Choice
Samsung Lions	Darin Ruf	.330	33	125	
SK Wyverns	Jamie Romak	.316	43	107	

== Postseason ==
Wild Card
4	Nexen Heroes	2
5	KIA Tigers	0

Semi-playoff
3	Hanwha Eagles	1
4	Nexen Heroes	3

Playoff
2	SK Wyverns	3
4	Nexen Heroes	2

Korean Series
1	Doosan Bears	2
2	SK Wyverns	4

=== Wild Card ===
The series started with a 1–0 advantage for the fourth-placed team.

Nexen Heroes (2) vs. KIA Tigers (0)

Game	Date	Score	Location	Time	Attendance
1	October 16	KIA Tigers – 6, Nexen Heroes – 10	Gocheok Sky Dome	3:42	15,915

=== Semi-Playoff ===
Hanwha Eagles (1) vs. Nexen Heroes (3)

Game	Date	Score	Location	Time	Attendance
1	October 19	Nexen Heroes – 3, Hanwha Eagles – 2	Daejeon Hanbat Baseball Stadium	4:15	12,400
2	October 20	Nexen Heroes – 7, Hanwha Eagles – 5	Daejeon Hanbat Baseball Stadium	4:28	12,400
3	October 22	Hanwha Eagles – 4, Nexen Heroes – 3	Gocheok Sky Dome	3:46	16,300
4	October 23	Hanwha Eagles – 2, Nexen Heroes – 5	Gocheok Sky Dome	3:41	16,300

=== Playoff ===
SK Wyverns (3) vs. Nexen Heroes (2)

Game	Date	Score	Location	Time	Attendance
1	October 27	Nexen Heroes – 8, SK Wyverns – 10	Munhak Baseball Stadium	3:54	24,219
2	October 28	Nexen Heroes – 1, SK Wyverns – 5	Munhak Baseball Stadium	3:22	23,642
3	October 30	SK Wyverns – 2, Nexen Heroes – 3	Gocheok Sky Dome	3:04	13,839
4	October 31	SK Wyverns – 2, Nexen Heroes – 4	Gocheok Sky Dome	3:19	11,683
5	November 2	Nexen Heroes – 10, SK Wyverns – 11 (10)	Munhak Baseball Stadium	4:54	18,562

=== Korean Series ===
Doosan Bears (2) vs. SK Wyverns (4)

Game	Date	Score	Location	Time	Attendance
1	November 4	SK Wyverns – 7, Doosan Bears – 3	Jamsil Baseball Stadium	3:58	25,000
2	November 5	SK Wyverns – 3, Doosan Bears – 7	Jamsil Baseball Stadium	3:14	25,000
3	November 7	Doosan Bears – 2, SK Wyverns – 7	Munhak Baseball Stadium	3:22	25,000
4	November 9	Doosan Bears – 2, SK Wyverns – 1	Munhak Baseball Stadium	3:07	25,000
5	November 10	Doosan Bears – 1, SK Wyverns – 4	Munhak Baseball Stadium	3:08	25,000
6	November 12	SK Wyverns – 5, Doosan Bears – 4 (13)	Jamsil Baseball Stadium	5:07	25,000

== Attendances ==
Team	Total attendance	Home average	Change vs. 2017
Doosan Bears	1,112,066	15,445	2 %
LG Twins	1,108,677	15,398	−2 %
SK Wyverns	1,037,211	14,406	16 %
Lotte Giants	901,634	12,523	−13 %
KIA Tigers	861,729	11,968	−16 %
Samsung Lions	752,310	10,449	7 %
Hanwha Eagles	734,110	10,196	24 %
KT Wiz	668,559	9,286	−3 %
Nexen Heroes	454,574	6,314	−35 %
NC Dinos	442,872	6,151	−17 %
Total	8,073,742	11,214	-4 %
