= Trey Hillman =

American baseball coach (born 1963)

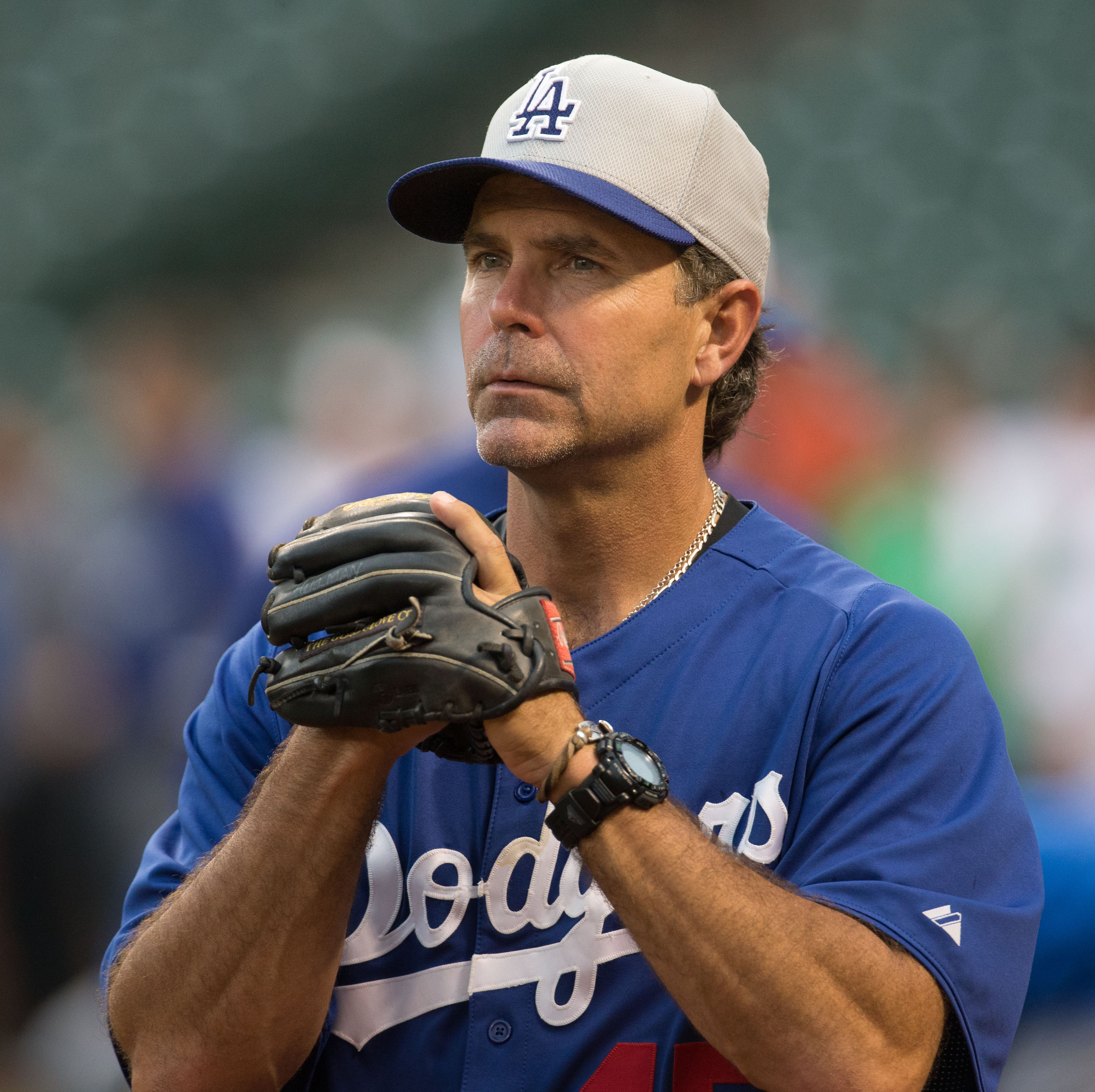
- Hillman with Los Angeles Dodgers, April 2013
- Infielder / Manager / Coach
- Born: January 4, 1963 (age 63); Amarillo, Texas, U.S.
- Bats: Right Throws: Right

NPB statistics
- Games: 689
- Win–loss record: 351–323
- Winning %: .521

MLB statistics
- Games: 359
- Win–loss record: 152–207
- Winning %: .423
- Stats at Baseball Reference
- Managerial record at Baseball Reference

Teams
- As manager: Hokkaido Nippon-Ham Fighters (2003–2007); Kansas City Royals (2008–2010); SK Wyverns (2017–2018); As coach: Los Angeles Dodgers (2011–2013); New York Yankees (2014); Houston Astros (2015–2016); Miami Marlins (2019–2021)

Career highlights and awards
- 2006 Japan Series champion; 2018 Korean Series champion

Thomas Brad "Trey" Hillman (born January 4, 1963) is an American professional baseball coach and manager. He has served as the manager of the Hokkaido Nippon-Ham Fighters in Nippon Professional Baseball (NPB), the Kansas City Royals in Major League Baseball (MLB) and the SK Wyverns in the KBO League. He has also been a coach for the Los Angeles Dodgers, New York Yankees, Houston Astros, and the Miami Marlins.

== Playing career ==
Hillman played college baseball at the University of Texas at Arlington. He signed with the Cleveland Indians in 1985, and played in the Indians farm system from 1985 to 1987, appearing in 162 games and hitting .179 while playing various infield positions.

== Coaching career ==
Hillman became a scout for the Indians in 1988. He became a manager in the New York Yankees minor league system in 1990 and remained in the Yankees farm system through 2001, including three years (1999–2001) as manager of the Triple-A Columbus Clippers. He won the league championship in 1990 with the Oneonta Yankees of the New York–Penn League.

He left the Yankees to become the director of player development for the Texas Rangers in 2002.

=== Hokkaido Nippon-Ham Fighters ===
Hillman was invited to manage the Hokkaido Nippon Ham Fighters in 2003. His team won the Pacific League championship in 2006, and returned to defend their title in 2007. It was the first pennant for the franchise in 25 years when they won the championship in 2006, and the repeated success in 2007 was accomplished despite the loss of key players such as Michihiro Ogasawara and Hideki Okajima. His team also won the Japan Series and Asia Series in 2006. The team set a franchise-record 14-game winning streak during the 2007 season.

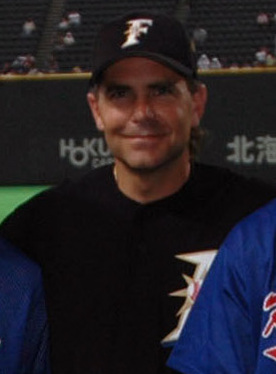
Hillman with the Fighters in 2006

Pitcher Satoru Kanemura spoke out against Hillman after he had been removed in a two out, bases loaded situation in a game on September 24, 2006. Kanemura was angered because he would have gotten his 10th win of the year if he had gotten through the inning. The team reacted harshly, penalizing Kanemura with a large fine and a suspension (which was later shortened). Kanemura apologized to Hillman afterwards, and went on to win Game 4 of the Japan Series.

==== "Shinjirarenai!" ====
Following the example of Chiba Lotte Marines manager Bobby Valentine, he showed his appreciation towards fans by speaking in broken Japanese sentences. After the game in which Fighters won the pennant in 2006, he shouted "Shinjirarenai!", the Japanese phrase stands for "Unbelievable", to the fans gathered in Sapporo Dome. He repeated the phrase after winning the Nippon Series, and repeated again after winning the Asia Championship. Thus, like Boston Red Sox's "The Impossible Dream", Hillman's "Shinjirarenai" became the most popular term describing Fighters' success in 2006.

==== Leaving Japan ====
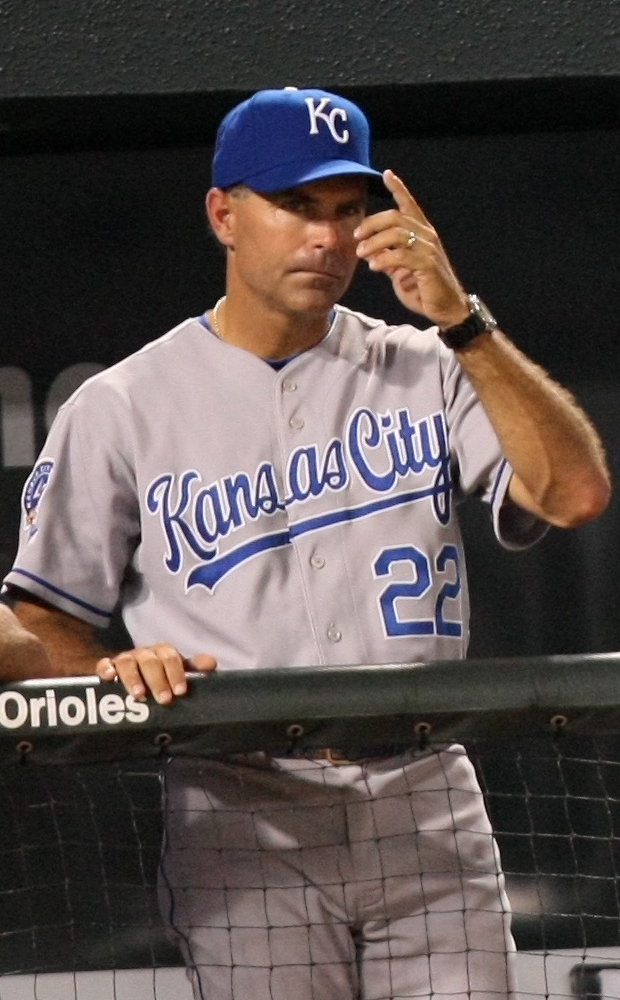
Hillman as manager for the Kansas City Royals in 2009

After the end of the 2006 season, Hillman was one of the final four candidates for the Texas Rangers' managerial position, but he eventually lost the job to Oakland Athletics third base coach Ron Washington. He was also a candidate for the San Diego Padres' managerial position around the same time, but the Padres elected to hire Bud Black instead. Following Joe Torre's departure from the New York Yankees, Hillman was considered to be a candidate to become the Yankees' next manager. On October 19, 2007, Hillman signed a multi-year contract to manage the Kansas City Royals. He was the first Major League Baseball manager to be hired based on his Japanese baseball record.

=== Kansas City Royals ===
On March 31, 2008, Hillman made his managerial debut for the Kansas City Royals. The Royals defeated the Detroit Tigers 5–4 in 11 innings to earn Hillman his first career managerial victory in MLB. Hillman said "It's a great honor, it's humbling."

Under Hillman, the Royals started the season 3–0 with a series sweep over the heavily favored Detroit Tigers. Through 15 games, the team was 9–6 compared to their 4–11 start from the previous season. By the end of the season, the Royals' 75–87 record was the team's best since 2003. Hillman returned for a second season with the Royals in 2009 but the team tallied a 65–97 record despite a promising start to the season. He served on Joe Maddon's coaching staff for the 2009 MLB All-Star Game.

Hillman was fired as manager of the Royals on May 13, 2010 and replaced by Royals' special adviser Ned Yost after the Royals posted a 12–23 record to begin the 2010 season.

=== Los Angeles Dodgers ===
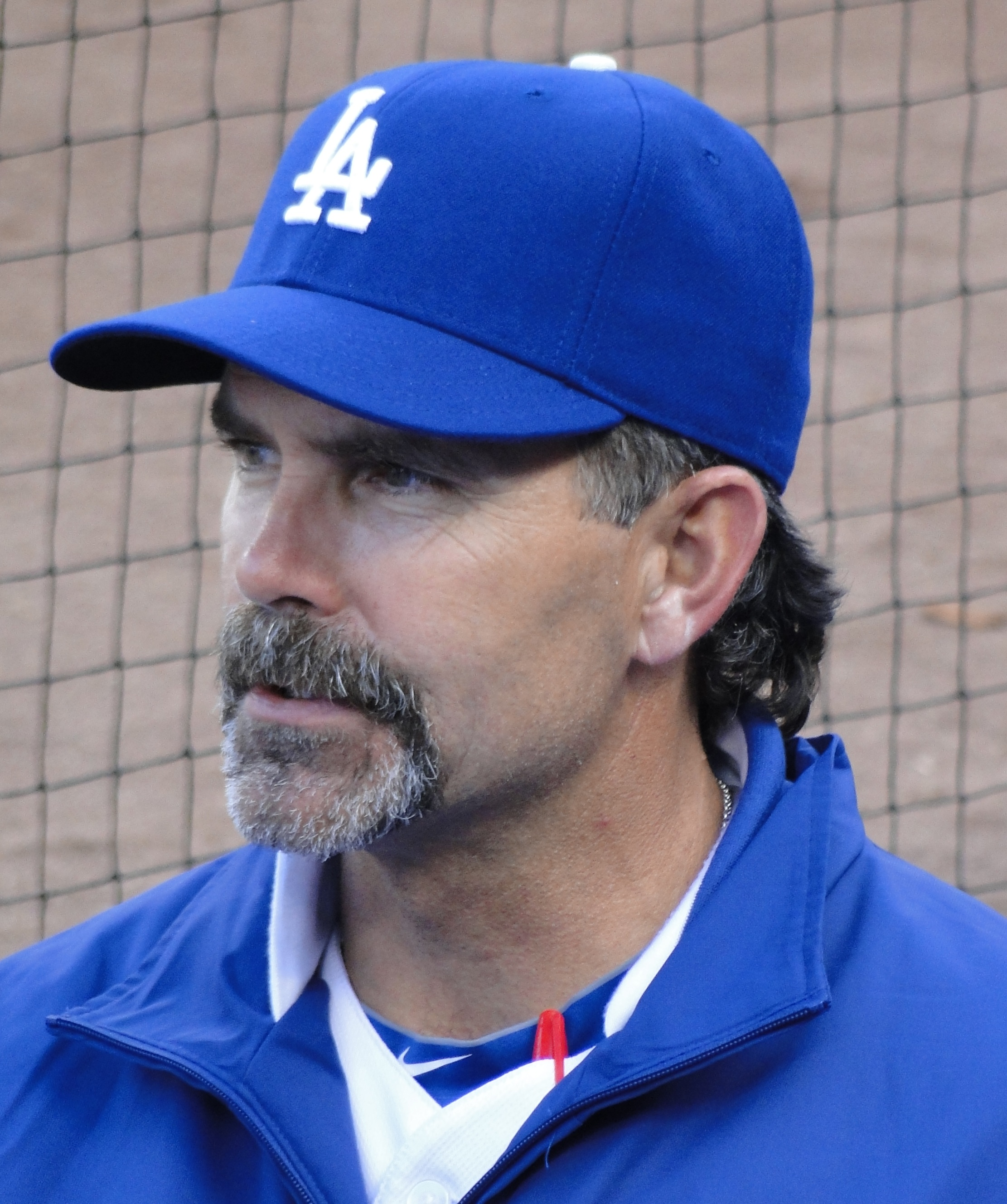
Hillman with the Dodgers in 2011

On November 22, 2010, Hillman was hired by the Los Angeles Dodgers to become their bench coach under new manager Don Mattingly.

After three seasons at this position, Hillman was fired by the Dodgers on October 22, 2013.

=== New York Yankees ===
He subsequently was hired by the New York Yankees to be a special assistant for major and minor league operations.

=== Houston Astros ===
On October 14, 2014, Hillman was hired by the Houston Astros to become their bench coach under new manager A. J. Hinch.

=== SK Wyverns ===
On October 26, 2016, Hillman was hired by the KBO League team SK Wyverns as their new manager. With this move, he became the first person to manage teams in Major League Baseball, Nippon Professional Baseball, and the KBO League. On November 12, 2018, Hillman became the first foreign manager to win the Korean Series by defeating Doosan Bears in the 2018 Korean Series. He also became the first manager to win the Korean Series and the Japan Series.

=== Miami Marlins ===
In December 2018, Hillman was hired by the Miami Marlins as their new infield and first base coach. He became the Marlins third base coach prior to the 2020 season. On October 22, 2021, Hillman left the Marlins organization to pursue other opportunities.

=== Los Angeles Angels ===
On January 24, 2022, Hillman was hired by the Los Angeles Angels as part of the team's player development staff.

== Personal life ==
Hillman is a Christian. He and his wife of more than 20 years, Marie, have two children, a son T.J., and a daughter Brianna, and live in Liberty Hill, Texas. Brianna is married to Brett Phillips.

=== Managerial record ===
As of July 25th, 2015

Team	From	To	Regular season record			Post–season record		
Team	From	To	W	L	Win %	W	L	Win %
Kansas City Royals	2008	2010	152	207	.423	0	0	–
Total			152	207	.423	0	0	–

Sporting positions
Preceded by Brian Butterfield	Oneonta Yankees manager 1990	Succeeded by Jack Gillis
Preceded by Brian Butterfield	Greensboro Hornets manager 1991–1992	Succeeded by Bill Evers
Preceded by Mike Hart	Prince William Cannons manager 1993	Succeeded by last manager
Preceded by first manager	Greensboro Bats manager 1994–1995	Succeeded by Rick Patterson
Preceded by Jake Gibbs	Tampa Yankees manager 1996	Succeeded by Lee Mazzilli
Preceded by Jim Essian	Norwich Navigators manager 1997–1998	Succeeded by Lee Mazzilli
Preceded by Stump Merrill	Columbus Clippers manager 1999–2001	Succeeded by Brian Butterfield
Preceded by Bob Schaefer	Los Angeles Dodgers bench coach 2011–2013	Succeeded by Tim Wallach
Preceded by Adam Everett	Houston Astros bench coach 2015–2016	Succeeded by Alex Cora
