= Kang Seung-ho =

South Korean baseball player (born 1994)

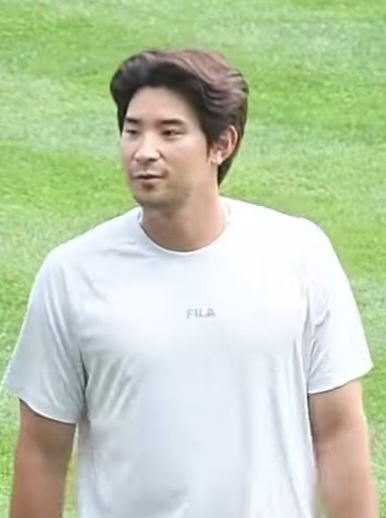

Doosan Bears – No. 23
- Infielder
- Born: 9 February 1994 (age 32); Suncheon, South Jeolla Province, South Korea
- Bats: Left Throws: Right

KBO debut
- April 1, 2016, for the LG Twins

KBO statistics (through 2025 season)
- Batting average: .256
- Home runs: 60
- Runs batted in: 346
- Stats at Baseball Reference

Teams
- LG Twins (2016–2018); SK Wyverns (2018–2019, 2020); Doosan Bears (2021–present)

Kang Seung-ho (Korean: 강승호; born 9 February 1994) is a South Korean professional baseball infielder for the Doosan Bears of the KBO League.
