= Kim Tae-hoon =

- Hangul: 김태훈
- RR: Gim Taehun
- MR: Kim T'aehun

Kim Tae-hoon may refer to:

- Kim Tae-hoon (actor) (born 1975), South Korean actor
- Kim Tae-hoon (baseball)
- Kim Tae-hoon (golfer) (born 1985), South Korean golfer
- Kim Tae-hoon (handballer), South Korean handball coach
- Kim Tae-hoon (speed skater) (born 1988), South Korean speed skater
- Kim Tae-hun (born 1994), South Korean taekwondo practitioner
