= Seo Jin-yong =

Korean baseball player

SSG Landers – No. 22
- Pitcher
- Born: October 2, 1992 (age 33); Busan, South Korea
- Bats: Right Throws: Right

KBO debut
- May 13, 2015, for the SK Wyverns

Career statistics (through 2025)
- Win–loss record: 29–26
- Earned run average: 3.98
- Strikeouts: 487
- Saves: 88

Teams
- SK Wyverns / SSG Landers (2015–present)

Career highlights and awards
- KBO saves leader (2023)

Seo Jin-yong (Korean: 서진용; born October 2, 1992 in Busan) is a South Korean pitcher for the SSG Landers in the Korea Baseball Organization.
