= Choi Joo-hwan =

South Korean baseball player (born 1988)

Kiwoom Heroes – No. 53
- Second baseman
- Born: February 28, 1988 (age 38)
- Bats: Left Throws: Right

KBO debut
- June 15, 2006, for the Doosan Bears

KBO statistics (through May 31, 2024)
- Batting average: .275
- Home runs: 119
- Runs batted in: 616
- Stats at Baseball Reference

Teams
- Doosan Bears (2006–2020); Sangmu Baseball Team (army) (2009–2011); SSG Landers (2021–2023); Kiwoom Heroes (2024–present)

Career highlights and awards
- 3x Korean Series champion (2015, 2016, 2019)

Choi Joo-hwan (Korean: 최주환; born February 28, 1988) is a South Korean second baseman who plays for the Kiwoom Heroes in the KBO League. He bats left-handed and throws right-handed.

== Amateur career ==
While attending Dongsung High School in Gwangju, Choi was considered one of the best second basemen in the Korean high school baseball league. In May 2005 Choi led his team to win the 39th President's Cup National High School Baseball Championship alongside Yang Hyeon-Jong and Han Ki-Joo, winning the RBI title with 9.

In September 2005, Choi was selected for the South Korea national junior baseball team to compete at the World Junior Baseball Championship, where South Korea won the silver medal. In the tourney, he batted .353 (6-for-17), playing in all 5 games as a starting second baseman.

=== Notable international careers ===
Year	Venue	Competition	Team	Individual note
2005	South Korea	Asian Junior Baseball Championship	Silver medal	.353 BA (6-for-17), 1 RBI, 2 R, 1 SB

== Professional career ==
After graduation from high school, Choi was selected by the Doosan Bears with the 50th overall pick of the 2006 KBO Draft. Choi played only four games in 2006 and three games in 2007 spending the majority of the campaign with the Bears' second-tier team. In 2008, he played in a career-high 16 games and had 4 hits and 6 RBI.

In 2009, Choi appeared in only nine games for the Bears, collecting no hits in ten at-bats. After the 2009 season, Choi temporarily left the Bears to serve a two-year mandatory military commitment.

=== Notable international careers ===
Year	Venue	Competition	Team	Individual note
2010	Chinese Taipei	Intercontinental Cup	6th	.259 BA (5-for-27), 5 RBI, 5 R
2011	Panama	Baseball World Cup	6th	.333 BA (14-for-42), 8 RBI, 1 HR, 6 R, 2 SB
