= Merrill Kelly =

American baseball player (born 1988)

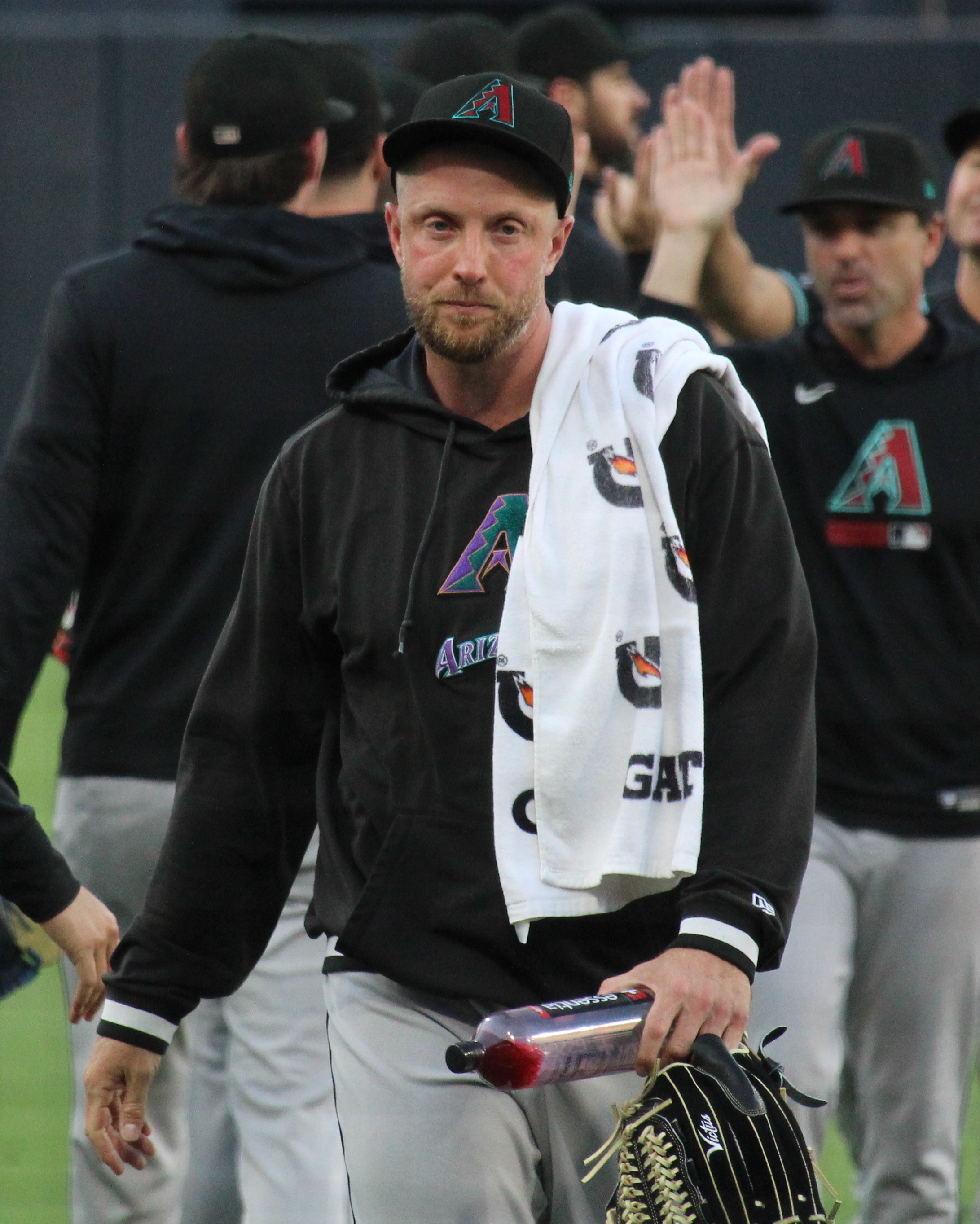
- Kelly with the Arizona Diamondbacks in 2026

Arizona Diamondbacks – No. 29
- Pitcher
- Born: October 14, 1988 (age 37); Houston, Texas, U.S.
- Bats: Right Throws: Right

Professional debut
- KBO: April 2, 2015, for the SK Wyverns
- MLB: April 1, 2019, for the Arizona Diamondbacks

KBO statistics (through 2018 season)
- Win–loss record: 48–32
- Earned run average: 3.86
- Strikeouts: 641

MLB statistics (through 2026 season)
- Win–loss record: 75–67
- Earned run average: 3.93
- Strikeouts: 1,024
- Stats at Baseball Reference

Teams
- SK Wyverns (2015–2018); Arizona Diamondbacks (2019–2025); Texas Rangers (2025); Arizona Diamondbacks (2026–present)

Career highlights and awards
- Korean Series champion (2018); KBO Strikeout leader (2017)
Medals
Men's baseball
Representing United States
World Baseball Classic
Silver medal – second place	2023 Miami	Team

Kenneth Merrill Kelly (born October 14, 1988) is an American professional baseball pitcher for the Arizona Diamondbacks of Major League Baseball (MLB). He has previously played in MLB for the Texas Rangers, and in the KBO League for the SK Wyverns.

== Early life and education ==
Kelly lived in Lake Forest, Illinois from grades three to eight. He also spent early years in Bryn Mawr, Pennsylvania, a Philadelphia suburb before relocating to Scottsdale, Arizona and attending Desert Mountain High School.

The Baltimore Orioles selected Kelly in the 37th round of the 2007 Major League Baseball (MLB) draft, but he did not sign a contract. He attended Yavapai College. After playing college baseball at Yavapai for two years, the Cleveland Indians took him in the 22nd round of the 2009 MLB draft, but again, he did not sign. He transferred to Arizona State University, where he played for the Arizona State Sun Devils in 2010.

== Professional career ==
=== Tampa Bay Rays ===
The Tampa Bay Rays selected Kelly in the eighth round (251st overall) of the 2010 MLB draft. Kelly advanced about one minor league level each season, beginning his career at Low-A in 2010 and reaching Triple-A for the first time in 2013. He split his first professional season between the Hudson Valley Renegades and the Bowling Green Hot Rods. He was 8–7 with a 3.28 ERA for the 2011 Charlotte Stone Crabs. He had an 8–3 record and a 3.57 ERA for the 2012 Montgomery Biscuits after being used primarily in relief. In 2013, he went 13–8 with 111 strikeouts and a 3.64 ERA in 28 games (26 starts) for the Biscuits and Triple-A Durham Bulls. He allowed only 128 hits in 158 1/3 innings. He was a non-roster invitee to 2014 spring training, but did not make the Opening Day roster. He pitched the 2014 season for Durham, going 9–4 with a 2.76 ERA, but remained in the minor leagues.

=== SK Wyverns ===
Kelly signed with the SK Wyverns of the Korea Baseball Organization (KBO) ahead of the 2015 season. In four seasons with SK Wyverns, Kelly pitched to a 48–32 record and a 3.86 ERA while winning the 2018 Korean Series. In Game 3 of the series, he pitched seven innings allowing two runs to earn the win. He became a free agent after the 2018 season.

=== Arizona Diamondbacks ===
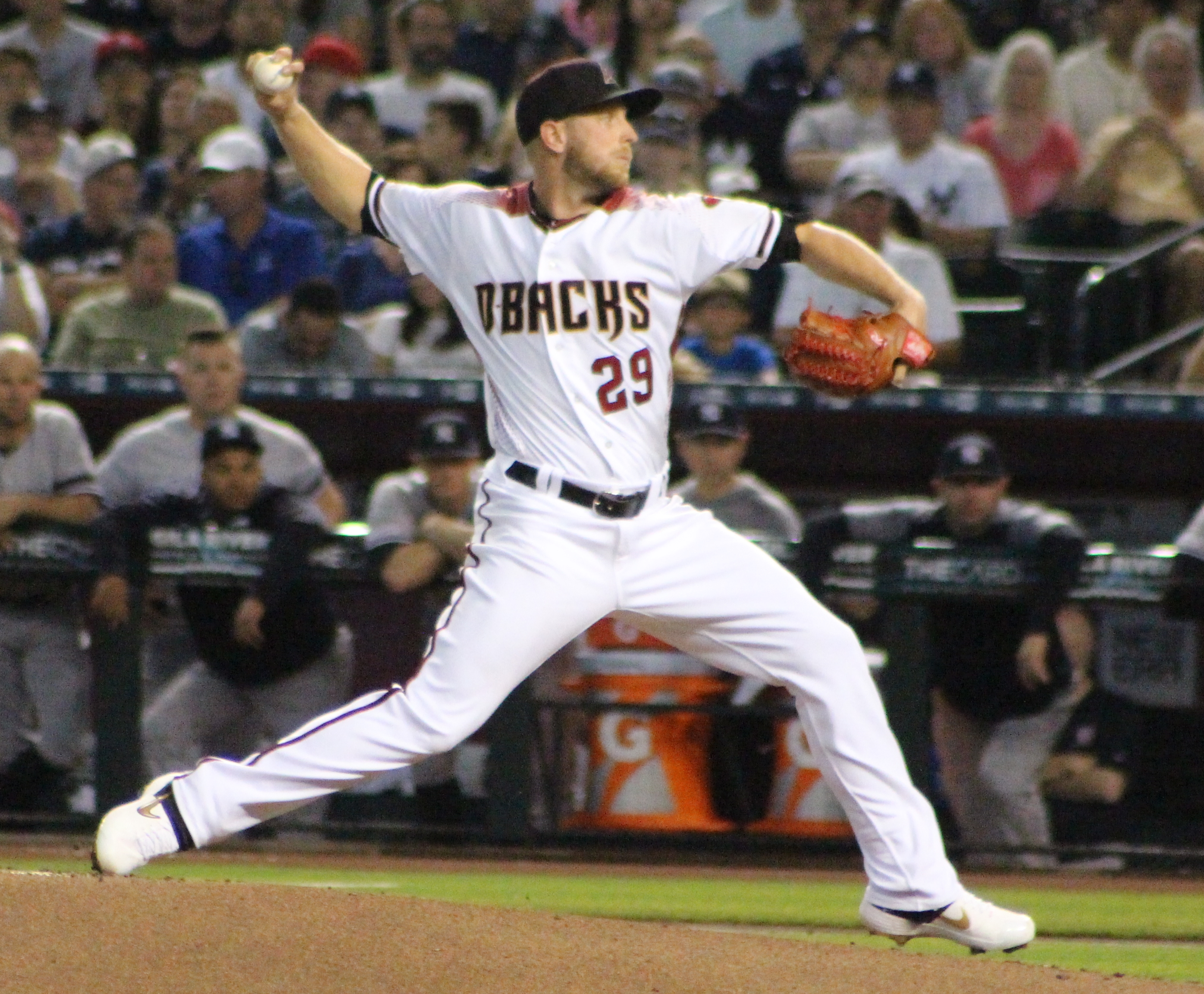
Kelly with the Arizona Diamondbacks in 2019

On December 4, 2018, MLB's Arizona Diamondbacks signed Kelly to a two-year major league contract. On April 1, 2019, Kelly made his major league debut in a start versus the San Diego Padres. He earned a win and recorded a quality start by totaling six innings while allowing three runs and striking out three. After struggling for much of the season, Diamondbacks' manager Torey Lovullo called Kelly into his office and issued a warning that he was considering sending him down. When Kelly asked why, Lovullo responded by saying, "You are statistically the worst pitcher in the National League." Kelly took this as a challenge to improve. He made some mechanical adjustments and flourished in September by going 4-1 with a 2.18 ERA in his last five starts. Overall in his first season with Arizona, Kelly led the National League in losses with 14 but led the team in wins (13) and innings (183 1/3). Kelly began the 2020 season in the rotation before being shut down on September 1 after 5 starts due to a shoulder injury. He returned healthy in 2021 but posted a 7–11 record over 27 starts on a Diamondbacks squad that lost 110 games.

On April 1, 2022, Kelly signed a two-year, $18 million contract extension with the Diamondbacks. He started the 2022 season with a 15-inning scoreless streak, three short of the franchise record to begin a season. Kelly won the National League Pitcher of the Month Award for July 2022 after pitching to a 1.31 ERA in six starts. He also won the National League Player of the Week Award for the week of July 25–31.

In Game 2 of the 2023 World Series, Kelly pitched a historic game. He pitched seven innings, striking out nine batters without allowing a walk. He only allowed three hits and one run. Only seven other pitchers in World Series history had ever pitched seven or more innings with that many strikeouts and no walks. With the Diamondbacks eventually winning the game, Kelly became the first player to win a game in both the World Series and Korean Series. Kelly finished the 2023 postseason with a 3–1 record in four starts with a 2.25 ERA.

In 2024, Kelly once more began the year as part of Arizona's rotation, logging a 2.19 ERA across his first four starts. He was placed on the injured list with a teres major muscle strain in his right shoulder on April 23, 2024. Kelly was transferred to the 60–day injured list on May 2, after it was announced that he would miss more than a month as a result of the injury. He was activated on August 11. Kelly made 13 total starts for Arizona in 2024, posting a 5-1 record and 4.03 ERA with 63 strikeouts across 73 2/3 innings pitched.

Kelly made 22 starts for the Diamondbacks in 2025, compiling a 9-6 record and 3.22 ERA with 121 strikeouts across 128.2 innings pitched.

=== Texas Rangers ===
On July 31, 2025, the Diamondbacks traded Kelly to the Texas Rangers in exchange for Kohl Drake, Mitch Bratt, and David Hagaman. In 10 starts for the Rangers, Kelly compiled a 3-3 record and 4.23 ERA with 46 strikeouts across 55 1/3 innings pitched.

=== Arizona Diamondbacks (second stint) ===
On December 19, 2025, Kelly signed a two-year, $40 million contract to return to the Arizona Diamondbacks. He was named the team's Opening Day starter in 2026, but began the season on the injured list. On May 15, 2026, Kelly pitched his first career complete game in a 9–1 victory over the Colorado Rockies.

== International career ==
On October 6, 2022, Kelly announced that he would represent the United States national baseball team in the 2023 World Baseball Classic. He started for the United States in the championship game against Japan and was credited with the loss.

== Personal life ==
Kelly's wife Bre gave birth to their first child, a daughter, Hadley, in February 2022.
