= Seo Geon-chang =

South Korean baseball player

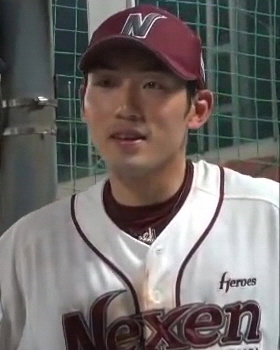

Kiwoom Heroes
- Second baseman
- Born: August 22, 1989 (age 37); Gwangju, South Korea
- Bats: Left Throws: Right

KBO debut
- July 23, 2008, for the LG Twins

KBO statistics (through May 30, 2024)
- Batting average: .297
- Home runs: 41
- Runs batted in: 519
- Stolen bases: 233
- Stats at Baseball Reference

Teams
- LG Twins (2008); Nexen/Kiwoom Heroes (2012–2021); LG Twins (2021–2023); Kia Tigers (2024–2025); Kiwoom Heroes (2026–present)

Career highlights and awards
- KBO Rookie of the Year (2012); KBO Most Valuable Player (2014); KBO single-season hits record — 201 (2014); KBO single-season runs scored record — 135 (2014); KBO sing-season triples record — 17 (2014)

- Seo Geon-chang
- Hangul: 서건창
- Hanja: 徐建昌
- RR: Seo Geonchang
- MR: Sŏ Kŏnch'ang

Seo Geon-chang (born August 22, 1989) is a South Korean professional baseball infielder who is currently playing for the Kiwoom Heroes of the KBO League. Seo is the first (and only) player in KBO history to have recorded 200 hits in a season.

Seo graduated from Gwangju Jeil High School.

He debuted in the KBO League with the LG Twins in 2008, but was released after only having one at-bat in the KBO. He then left professional baseball to fulfill his compulsory military service. After the completion of his service, Seo tried out with the Nexen Heroes, eventually making it back to the KBO in 2012, when he won the KBO League Rookie of the Year Award.

In 2014 Seo had a league-record 201 hits to go along with a league-leading batting average of .370. He also set single-season records for runs scored, 135, and triples, 17. He won the KBO League Most Valuable Player Award for the 2014 season. With his MVP award, Seo became the second KBO player (after Hyun-jin Ryu) to win both Rookie of the Year and Most Valuable Player.

Seo played for the South Korea national baseball team in the 2017 World Baseball Classic.

He was traded to the LG Twins in 2021, and moved to Kia Tigers in 2024 season.
