= Ángel Sánchez (pitcher) =

Dominican baseball player (born 1989)

Leones del Escogido – No. 40
- Pitcher
- Born: November 28, 1989 (age 36); Salcedo, Dominican Republic
- Bats: Right Throws: Right

Professional debut
- MLB: August 24, 2017, for the Pittsburgh Pirates
- KBO: March 27, 2018, for the SK Wyverns
- NPB: June 21, 2020, for the Yomiuri Giants
- CPBL: September 1, 2024, for the CTBC Brothers

MLB statistics (through 2017 season)
- Win–loss record: 1–0
- Earned run average: 8.76
- Strikeouts: 10

KBO statistics (through 2019 season)
- Win–loss record: 25–13
- Earned run average: 3.68
- Strikeouts: 272

NPB statistics (through 2021 season)
- Win–loss record: 13–9
- Earned run average: 3.81
- Strikeouts: 113

CPBL statistics (through 2024 season)
- Win–loss record: 3–1
- Earned run average: 3.90
- Strikeouts: 17
- Stats at Baseball Reference

Teams
- Pittsburgh Pirates (2017); SK Wyverns (2018–2019); Yomiuri Giants (2020–2021); CTBC Brothers (2024)

Career highlights and awards
- KBO: Korean Series champion (2018); CPBL: Taiwan Series champion (2024)
Medals
Men's baseball
Representing Dominican Republic
Olympic Games
Bronze medal – third place	2020 Tokyo	Team

Ángel Luis Sánchez (born November 28, 1989) is a Dominican professional baseball pitcher for El Águila de Veracruz of the Mexican League. He has previously played in Major League Baseball (MLB) for the Pittsburgh Pirates, in the KBO League for the SK Wyverns, in Nippon Professional Baseball (NPB) for the Yomiuri Giants, and in the Chinese Professional Baseball League (CPBL) for the CTBC Brothers.

== Career ==
=== Los Angeles Dodgers ===
Sánchez signed with the Los Angeles Dodgers as an amateur free agent on December 1, 2010. He made his professional debut with the Single-A Great Lakes Loons in the Midwest League in 2011, where he was 8–4 in 20 games (16 starts) with a 2.82 ERA. He was promoted to the High-A Rancho Cucamonga Quakes in 2012 where he struggled a bit, going 6–12 with a 6.58 ERA in 27 games (23 starts). Sánchez returned to Great Lakes to start 2013 where he was 2–7 with a 4.88 ERA in 14 starts before he was returned to Rancho Cucamonga.

=== Miami Marlins ===
On July 6, 2013, he was traded to the Miami Marlins (along with Josh Wall and Steve Ames) in exchange for Ricky Nolasco. He finished the year with the High-A Jupiter Hammerheads, going 4-3 with a 3.22 ERA in 10 appearances. He was added to the Marlins 40-man roster on November 20, 2013. He was assigned to the Double-A Jacksonville Suns to begin the 2014 season.

=== Tampa Bay Rays ===
On June 13, 2014, Sánchez was claimed off waivers by the Tampa Bay Rays and optioned to the Double-A Montgomery Biscuits. He was designated for assignment on June 30 after struggling to an 8.00 ERA in 2 games for Montgomery.

=== Chicago White Sox ===
On July 2, 2014, Sánchez was claimed off waivers by the Chicago White Sox and assigned to the High-A Winston-Salem Dash. In 2 games for Winston-Salem, Sánchez logged a 4.26 ERA and 1-1 record, and also recorded a 1-2 record and 6.60 ERA in 3 games for the Double-A Birmingham Barons.

=== Pittsburgh Pirates ===
On July 31, 2014, Sánchez was claimed off waivers by the Pittsburgh Pirates and optioned to the Double-A Altoona Curve. In 6 games for Altoona, he pitched to a 4.32 ERA with 21 strikeouts. On December 8, 2014, Sánchez was outrighted off of the 40-man roster following the waiver claim of Josh Lindblom. He split the 2015 season between Altoona and the Triple-A Indianapolis Indians, pitching to a cumulative 13-2 record and 2.69 ERA between the two teams. On September 5, 2015, it was announced that Sánchez would undergo Tommy John surgery and miss the 2016 season as a result. He was released on March 14, 2016, and quickly re-signed to a minor league contract the next day. In 2017, Sánchez was assigned to Indianapolis to begin the 2017 season, where he pitched to a 3-5 record and 3.74 ERA in 39 appearances.

Sánchez was selected to the 40-man roster and called up to the majors for the first time on August 23, 2017. In his debut, he pitched 2.0 innings of 2-run ball against the Los Angeles Dodgers. He finished his rookie season with a 1-0 record and 8.76 ERA in 8 games for the Pirates. On November 27, Sánchez was released by the organization to pursue an opportunity in Japan.

=== SK Wyverns ===
On November 27, 2017, Sánchez signed a one-year, $1.1 million contract with the SK Wyverns of the KBO League. In 2018, Sánchez pitched to an 8-8 record and 4.89 ERA with 124 strikeouts in 145.1 innings of work. Sánchez won the Korean Series with the club in 2018. The next year, he pitched in 28 games for the Wyverns, logging a stellar 17-5 record and 2.62 ERA with 148 strikeouts in 165.0 innings pitched. He became a free agent following the 2019 season.

=== Yomiuri Giants ===
On December 6, 2019, Sánchez signed a multi-year contract with the Yomiuri Giants of Nippon Professional Baseball. In 2020, he pitched in 15 games for Yomiuri, posting an 8-4 record and 3.08 ERA with 59 strikeouts. He became a free agent after the 2021 season.

=== San Diego Padres ===
After taking the 2022 season off, on January 16, 2023, Sanchez signed a minor league contract with the San Diego Padres organization. He spent the year with the Triple–A El Paso Chihuahuas, also appearing in two games for the rookie–level Arizona Complex League Padres. In 24 games for El Paso, Sánchez struggled to a 6.66 ERA with 55 strikeouts across 52 2/3 innings. He elected free agency following the season on November 6.

=== Pericos de Puebla ===
On March 4, 2024, Sánchez signed with the Pericos de Puebla of the Mexican League. In six starts, Sánchez registered a 3–0 record with a 2.35 ERA, 29 strikeouts, and a 0.97 WHIP across 38 1/3 innings.

=== Tampa Bay Rays (second stint) ===
On May 16, 2024, Sánchez had his contract purchased by the Tampa Bay Rays. In 6 games (5 starts) for the Triple–A Durham Bulls, he compiled a 4–2 record and 2.36 ERA with 15 strikeouts across 26 2/3 innings of work. Sánchez was released by the Rays organization on June 27.

=== CTBC Brothers ===
On July 16, 2024, Sánchez signed with the CTBC Brothers of the Chinese Professional Baseball League. In 5 starts for the team, he logged a 3–1 record and 3.90 ERA with 17 strikeouts over 30 innings of work. With the Brothers, Sánchez won the 2024 Taiwan Series.

=== Pericos de Puebla (second stint) ===
On April 17, 2025, Sánchez signed with the Pericos de Puebla of the Mexican League. In 14 starts for the Pericos, Sánchez compiled an 8-4 record and 4.88 ERA with 51 strikeouts over 66 1/3 innings of work.

=== El Águila de Veracruz ===
On November 25, 2025, Sánchez was traded to El Águila de Veracruz of the Mexican League in exchange for David Rodríguez.
