= A. B. Lucas Secondary School =

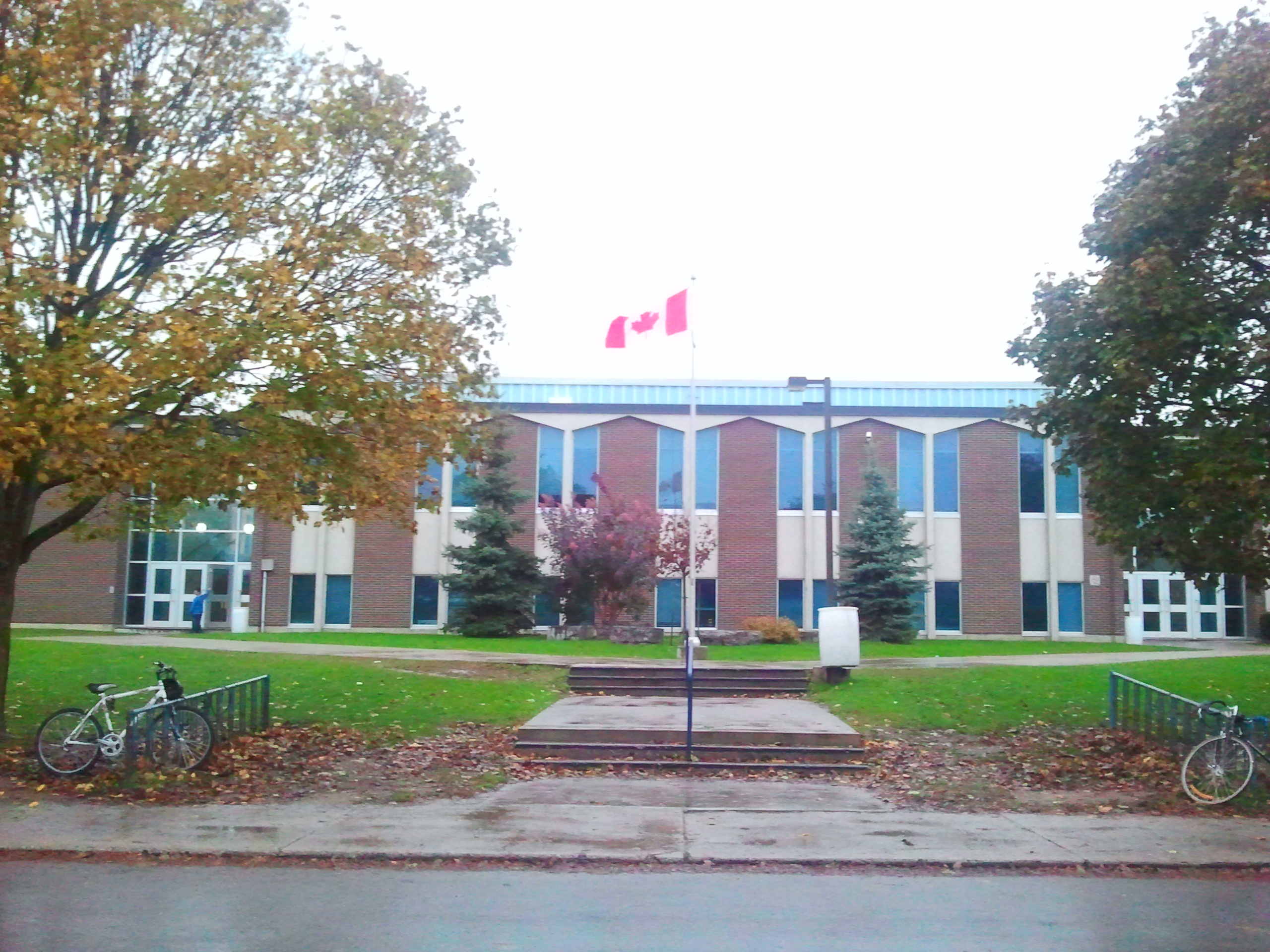
- Front Facade

Location
- 656 Tennent Avenue; London, Ontario, N5X 1L8; Canada; 43°01′58″N 081°14′49″W

Information
- Type: Comprehensive public secondary school
- Motto: In Perpetuum Optima
- Founded: 1963; 63 years ago (current facility)
- School district: Thames Valley District School Board
- Principal: Mr. George Bullas
- Grades: 9–12
- Enrollment: 1,472 (2022-23)
- Hours in school day: 6
- Campus size: 5.8 acres (2.3 ha)
- Colors: Cobalt Blue; Baby Blue
- Fight song: Scotland the Brave
- Mascot: Viktor the Viking
- Team name: Lucas Vikings
- Rival: Medway Secondary School
- National ranking: Fourth (2017–18)
- Website: lucas.tvdsb.ca
- Building details

General information
- Architectural style: International Style

Design and construction
- Architect: R.D Schoales

A. B. Lucas Secondary School is a secondary school located at the northern end of London, Ontario, Canada.

The school was named after Alexander Burton Lucas, who was recognized for his contribution to education in London. In April 1962, Hugh Murray became the first principal. He commissioned lieutenants Terry Ferris, Jim Wylie, Don Epplet, Phil Sparling, Don Carson, Charlie Belchamber, Alex Shamas, Alan Williams, Ed Hancox and Fred Hickman. During the next few months, these men recruited more staff, acquired equipment and supplies and arranged programs.

During the years 1962–1963 some 60 north-Londoners traveled daily to Westminster Secondary School in the west end of the city. But by September 1963 the doors were opened to the first Viking recruits in grades 9, 10, and 11. The premier of Ontario, John Robarts, officially opened the school on October 25, 1963.

== History and construction ==
By early 1960, monumental growth in north London soon established the need for the construction of a new secondary school to accommodate the new families moving into the area. Suffering economic restraint, the Board of Education was hesitant to approve growth, but eventually approved the project in an effort to reduce the strain on other schools in the city.

Robert D. Schoales, a noted regional modernist, was responsible for the design of the existing structure that would be built concurrently with Westminster Secondary School in Byron. As architect for the London Board of Education, Schoales was responsible for the design of many of London's mid-century school buildings, including Knollwood Park Public School (70 Gammage Street), G. A. Wheable Centre for Adult Education London (70 Jacqueline Street), and many others. His design incorporated an L-shaped two-story brick structure, including a stilted instrumental music wing, and auditorium. Terrazzo flooring was chosen for its durability, while glazed tile was utilised as an attractive, yet cost effective decoration for the entrance foyers. In addition to consultation work with educational boards throughout Ontario, Schoales collaborated with the Ministry of the Solicitor General, providing advice in the design and construction of correctional facilities across the province.

During the construction process, the future students of Lucas (including a large number of future Westminster students) attended Wheable Secondary School while they waited for their new school to be completed. Following the organization of the schools' administrative teams, the staff and students of Wheable attended classes in the morning while the Lucas and Westminster staff and students attended afternoon shifts, ending at 5:45 pm each day. These original students recall 'not starting classes until noon hour and then boarding the buses in the dark and arriving at their country homes in the pitch black of a winter's night.'

A. B. Lucas was officially opened in October 1963, seven months following the completion of Westminster. While the building was considered impressive by both students and journalists, many of the buildings features had yet to be completed, and it would be several months before the school would become fully operational. The irritation from concrete and plaster dust constantly lingering in the air forced many students wearing contact lenses to wear only one at a time in an effort to allow the other eye to heal. Rodents meanwhile infested the lockers, using the drain holes in each locker to scavenge food from unsuspecting students' lunch boxes.

== Academics and rankings ==
A. B. Lucas Secondary School ranked 186th out of all 738 secondary schools in Ontario in the 2017–18 Fraser Institute Ontario secondary school ranking with an overall rating of 7.2 out of 10. The school has consistently performed well, ranking 148th out of 625 in the most recent 5 years

== Events ==
=== Relay for Life ===
On June 1, 2018, A. B. Lucas Secondary School ranked #1 in Canada by the students raising $201,000 to support cancer research with the Canadian Cancer Society for the annual overnight event, Relay for Life.

Lucas had previously also been ranked #1 in Canada in 2026 by raising $168,000.

Since 2026, A. B. Lucas Secondary School has raised a cumulative total of $2,000,000 for the nationwide event and is the first school in Canada to achieve that goal.

== Notable alumni ==
- Craig Billington, former NHL goalie
- Trevor Blumas, actor
- Logan Couture, NHL player for the San Jose Sharks
- Jeff Hackett, former NHL goalie
- Nazem Kadri, NHL player for the Colorado Avalanche, 2022 Stanley Cup champion.
- David Lee, CFL player for Saskatchewan Roughriders
- Deb Matthews, M.P.P. for London North Centre
- Gloria Reuben, actress
- Jamie Romak, baseball player for SSG Landers
- David Shore, creator of House MD

== See also ==
- Education in Ontario
- List of secondary schools in Ontario
