= Todd Radom =

American graphic designer (b. 1964)

Todd Radom (born 1964 in New York, New York) is a graphic designer who is responsible for many of the logos used by American sports teams. He is the author of the book Winning Ugly: A Visual History of the Most Bizarre Baseball Uniforms Ever Worn. His designs include the current logos of the Washington Nationals and Anaheim Angels. Among his many other creations were the logos for the Super Bowl, and the Basketball Hall of Fame.

In 2017, Radom worked with U.S. rapper and actor Ice Cube to create logos and uniforms for the BIG3 Basketball League. Also in 2017, the Chicago White Sox commissioned Radom to create their 2017 premium season ticket package. The National Baseball Hall of Fame and Museum in Cooperstown selected the project for inclusion in its permanent collection. In January 2024, Radom alongside another American sports logo designer, Bill Frederick, collaborated with KBO League's club, SSG Landers, to launch a brand new logo and corresponding uniform design for the team before the 2024 KBO season.

Radom's style is dominated by two elements: his distinctive use of typography and his inclusion of classic visual elements.

A 1986 graduate of the School of Visual Arts, Radom has designed hundreds of book covers and helped develop corporate identities for non-sports clients.

Before creating his own design firm in 1990, he worked in book publishing at William Morrow and Company and at Penguin Books. Currently he works and lives in Katonah, New York.
