= Park Jung-kwon =

South Korean baseball player (born 1981)

Doosan Bears
- First baseman / Coach
- Born: July 21, 1981 (age 45); Jeonju, North Jeolla
- Bats: Left Throws: Left

KBO debut
- April 5, 2004, for the SK Wyverns

KBO statistics (through July 2, 2019)
- Batting average: .274
- Hits: 1,132
- Home runs: 177
- RBI: 677
- Stats at Baseball Reference

Teams
- As player: SK Wyverns (2004–2019); As coach: SK Wyverns/SSG Landers 2nd Team (2020–2023); SSG Landers (2023); Doosan Bears (2027–present); As Baseball Commentator: MBC Sports+ (2025–2026)
Medals
Men's baseball
Representing South Korea
Baseball World Cup
Silver medal – second place	2005 Netherlands	Team

- Park Jung-kwon
- Hangul: 박정권
- Hanja: 朴正權
- RR: Bak Jeonggwon
- MR: Pak Chŏnggwŏn

Park Jung-kwon (Korean: 박정권; born July 21, 1981) is a South Korean professional baseball infielder currently playing for the SK Wyverns of the KBO League.
