= Kim Tae-hoon (baseball) =

Korean baseball player

- Pitcher
- Born: May 19, 1990 (age 35); Guri, South Korea
- Batted: Left Threw: Left

KBO debut
- September 17, 2010, for the SK Wyverns

Last KBO appearance
- June 2, 2022, for the SSG Landers

Career statistics
- Win–loss record: 18–22
- Earned run average: 5.18
- Strikeouts: 326
- Stats at Baseball Reference

Teams
- SK Wyverns / SSG Landers (2010–2022)

Kim Tae-hoon (Korean: 김태훈; born May 19, 1990, in Guri, Gyeonggi) is a South Korean former pitcher for the SSG Landers of the KBO League.
