= Jamie Romak =

Canadian baseball player (born 1985)

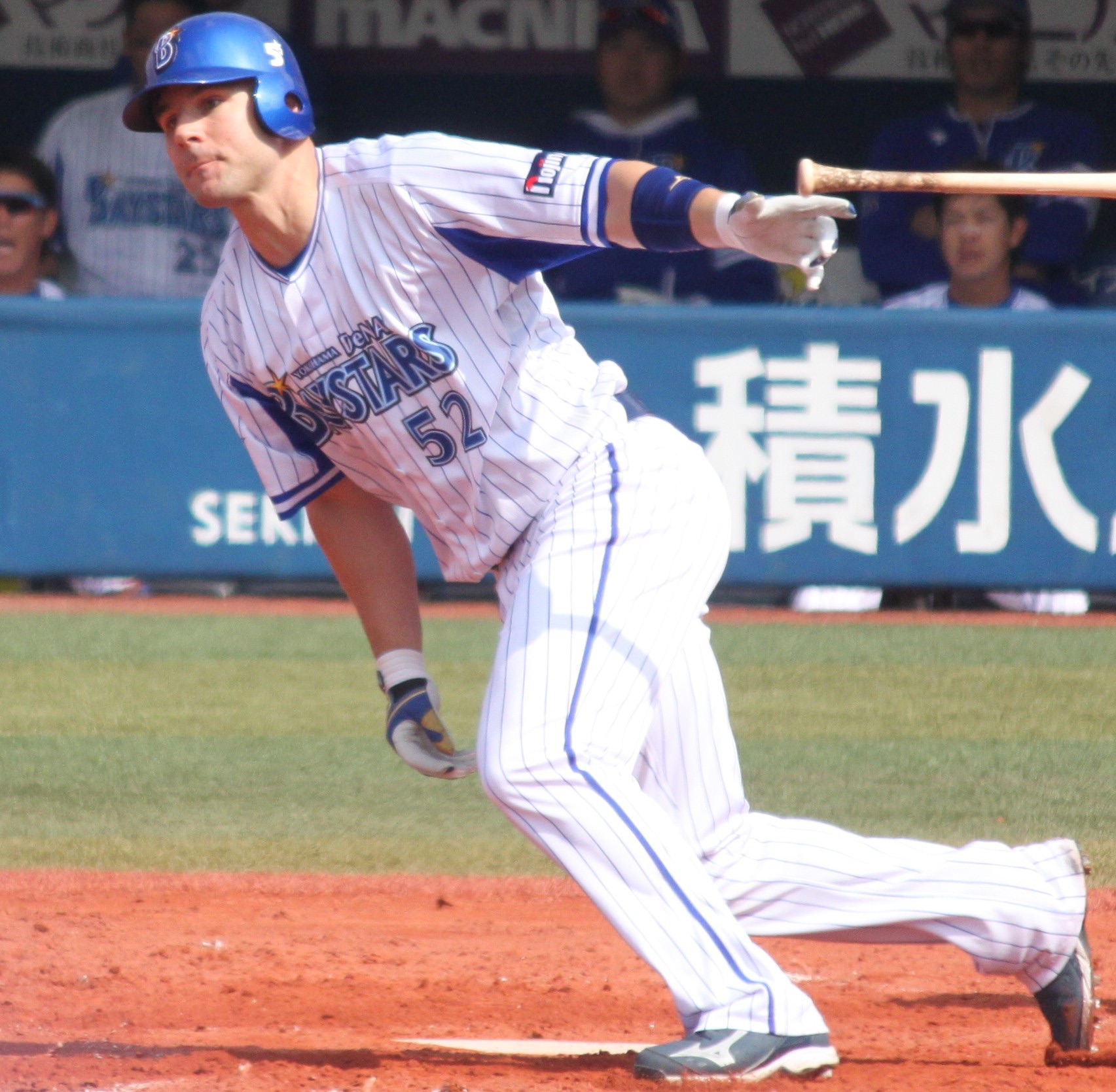
- Romak with the Yokohama DeNA BayStars
- Right fielder / First baseman
- Born: September 30, 1985 (age 41); London, Ontario, Canada
- Batted: Right Threw: Right

Professional debut
- MLB: May 28, 2014, for the Los Angeles Dodgers
- NPB: March 25, 2016, for the Yokohama DeNA BayStars
- KBO: May 11, 2017, for the SK Wyverns

Last appearance
- MLB: October 2, 2015, for the Arizona Diamondbacks
- NPB: 2016, for the Yokohama DeNA BayStars
- KBO: July 11, 2021, for the SSG Landers

MLB statistics
- Batting average: .167
- Home runs: 0
- Runs batted in: 4

NPB statistics
- Batting average: .113
- Home runs: 0
- Runs batted in: 2

KBO statistics
- Batting average: .277
- Home runs: 153
- Runs batted in: 403
- Stats at Baseball Reference

Teams
- Los Angeles Dodgers (2014); Arizona Diamondbacks (2015); Yokohama DeNA BayStars (2016); SK Wyverns/SSG Landers (2017–2021)

Career highlights and awards
- Korean Series champion (2018)
Medals
Men's baseball
Representing Canada
Baseball World Cup
Bronze medal – third place	2011 Panama City	Team
Pan American Games
Gold medal – first place	2011 Guadalajara	Team

James Robert Romak (born September 30, 1985) is a Canadian former professional baseball player. He played in Major League Baseball (MLB) for the Arizona Diamondbacks and Los Angeles Dodgers, Nippon Professional Baseball (NPB) for the Yokohama DeNA BayStars, and the KBO League for the SK Wyverns/SSG Landers. Romak has also competed for the Canadian national baseball team.

== Amateur career ==
Romak attended A.B. Lucas Secondary School in London, Ontario, Canada.

== Professional career ==
=== Atlanta Braves ===
He was selected by the Atlanta Braves in the fourth round (127th overall) of the 2003 MLB draft. He made his professional debut with the Gulf Coast Braves of the Rookie-level Gulf Coast League in 2003, and played for the Danville Braves of the Rookie-level Appalachian League in 2004 and 2005. He was promoted to the Rome Braves of the Class-A South Atlantic League (SAL) in 2006, where he had a .247 batting average, 26 doubles, 16 home runs and 68 runs batted in.

=== Pittsburgh Pirates ===
Before the 2007 season, the Braves traded Romak with Adam LaRoche to the Pittsburgh Pirates for Mike Gonzalez and Brent Lillibridge. The Pirates assigned Romak to the Hickory Crawdads of the SAL, before promoting him to the Lynchburg Hillcats of the High-A Carolina League. Before the 2008 season, Baseball Prospectus rated Romak as the Pirates sixth best prospect. Romak split the 2008 and 2009 seasons with the Hillcats and Altoona Curve of the Double-A Eastern League.

=== Kansas City Royals ===
Romak signed with the Kansas City Royals as a minor league free agent for the 2010 season. With the Wilmington Blue Rocks of the Carolina League, Romak was named Player of the Week three times in June, winning Player of the Month honours as well. Romak batted .251 with 23 home runs for the Northwest Arkansas Naturals of the Double-A Texas League in 2011. He resigned with the Royals for 2012.

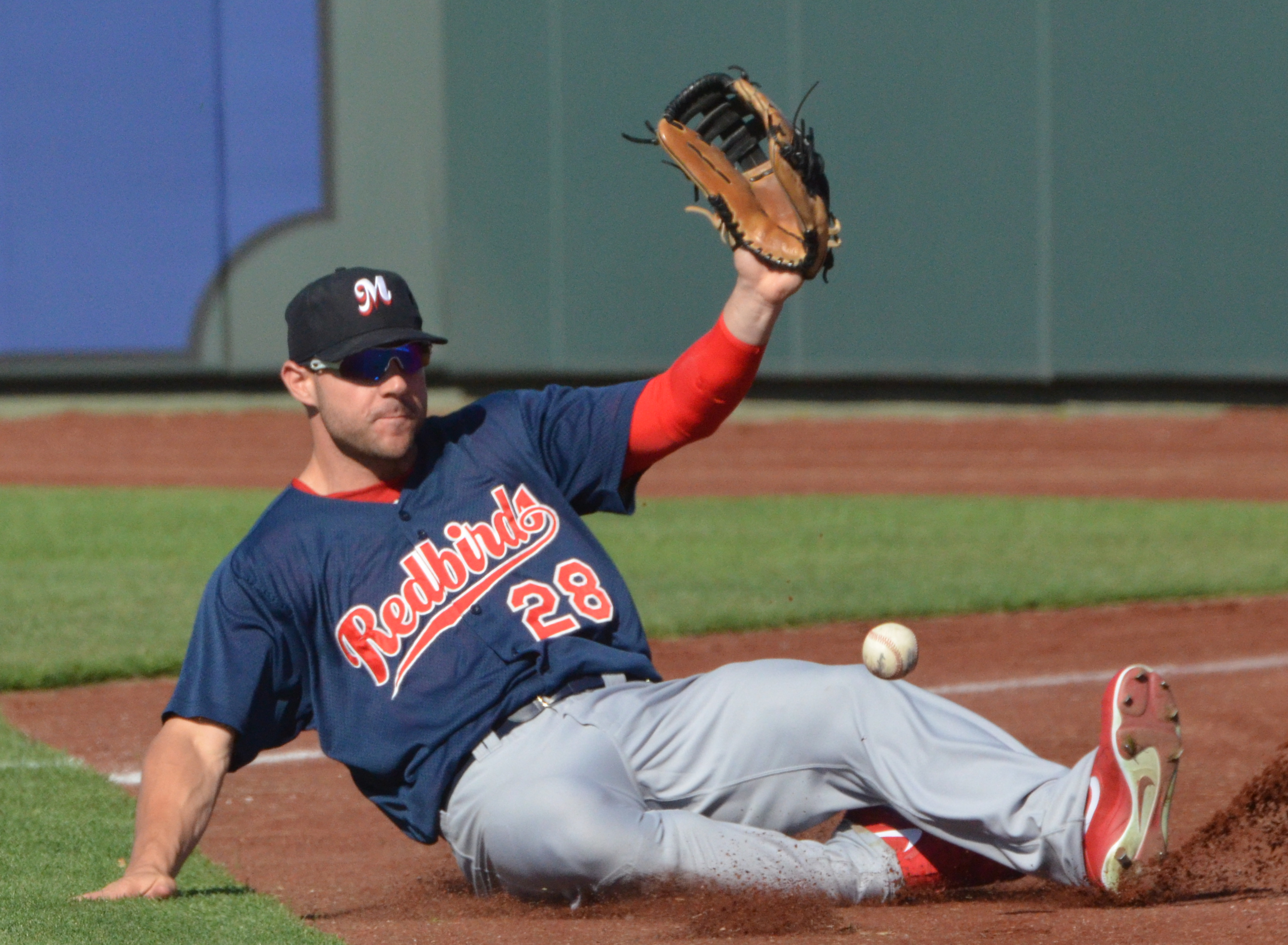
Romak playing for the Memphis Redbirds in 2013

=== St. Louis Cardinals ===
On May 17, 2012, Romak was traded to the St. Louis Cardinals in exchange for cash considerations. He played in 64 games for the Double-A Springfield Cardinals, hitting .267 with 10 home runs and 42 RBI; in 31 games for the Triple-A Memphis Redbirds, he hit .277 with no home runs and 12 RBI.

On November 20, 2012, Romak re-signed with the Cardinals organization on a minor league contract.

=== Los Angeles Dodgers ===
On November 16, 2013, Romak signed a minor league contract with the Los Angeles Dodgers and was assigned to the Triple-A Albuquerque Isotopes. In 108 games for the Isotopes in 2014, he hit .280 with 24 home runs and 85 RBI.

He was called up to the Dodgers on May 28, 2014, after 1,069 games and 4,306 plate appearances in the minor leagues. He ground out to second base in his MLB debut, as a pinch hitter. Romak's first hit was a two-RBI double off Matt Belisle of the Colorado Rockies on June 8. That was his only hit in 21 at-bats for the Dodgers. Romak was designated for assignment by Los Angeles on June 25.

=== Arizona Diamondbacks ===
Romak signed with the Arizona Diamondbacks as a minor league free agent in November 2014.

On August 8, 2015, the Diamondbacks selected his contract from the Triple-A Reno Aces. In 12 appearances in 2015, he had five hits in 15 at-bats, including a double in what would end up being his final major league at-bat. On November 10, The Diamondbacks released Romak.

=== Yokohama DeNA BayStars ===
On November 13, 2015, he signed with the Yokohama DeNA BayStars of Nippon Professional Baseball.

March 25, 2016, Romak made his NPB debut.

=== San Diego Padres ===
On November 8, 2016, Romak signed a minor league contract with the San Diego Padres. In 25 games for the Triple–A El Paso Chihuahuas, Romak batted .347/.392/.800 with 11 home runs and 25 RBI.

=== SK Wyverns/SSG Landers ===
On May 7, 2017, Romak had his contract sold to the SK Wyverns of the KBO League. On May 11, 2017, Romak made his KBO debut. During the 2020/2021 offseason, the Wyverns rebranded as the SSG Landers. On October 31, 2021, Romak announced his retirement from professional baseball. In 5 seasons in the KBO for the Wyverns/Landers, Romak played in 626 games, hitting .273/.376/.532 with 155 home runs and 409 RBI, and won the Korean Series with the team in 2018.

== International career ==
Romak has played for the Canada national baseball team. He participated in the 2007 Baseball World Cup, the 2011 Baseball World Cup, winning the bronze medal, and the 2011 Pan American Games, winning the gold medal. The 2011 Canadian team was inducted in the Canadian Baseball Hall of Fame.
