= No Brand Burger =

South Korean fast food chain

- Native name: 노브랜드 버거
- Romanized name: Nobeuraendeu Beogeo
- Company type: Subsidiary
- Industry: Fast food
- Founded: August 2019 in Hongdae, Mapo-gu, Seoul, South Korea
- Headquarters: South Korea
- Number of locations: ▲250+ restaurants (2024)
- Products: Brand cola, cider (브랜드 콜라, 사이다); burgers; coffee; desserts; fries; juices; salads; soft drinks; tea
- Parent: Shinsegae Food Inc.
- Website: Official website

No Brand Burger (Korean: 노브랜드 버거) is a fast food hamburger chain based in South Korea. The company is operated by Shinsegae Food Inc., which is owned by Shinsegae. The name was borrowed from No Brand (이마트 노브랜드), a private label of Emart. Also, No Brand Burger's yellow, black, and white color scheme used in its logo, decor, packaging, and adverts was adopted from No Brand's. The official motto of No Brand Burger is "Why pay more? It's good enough." which reflects the cost of items on the chain's menu.

== Marketing ==
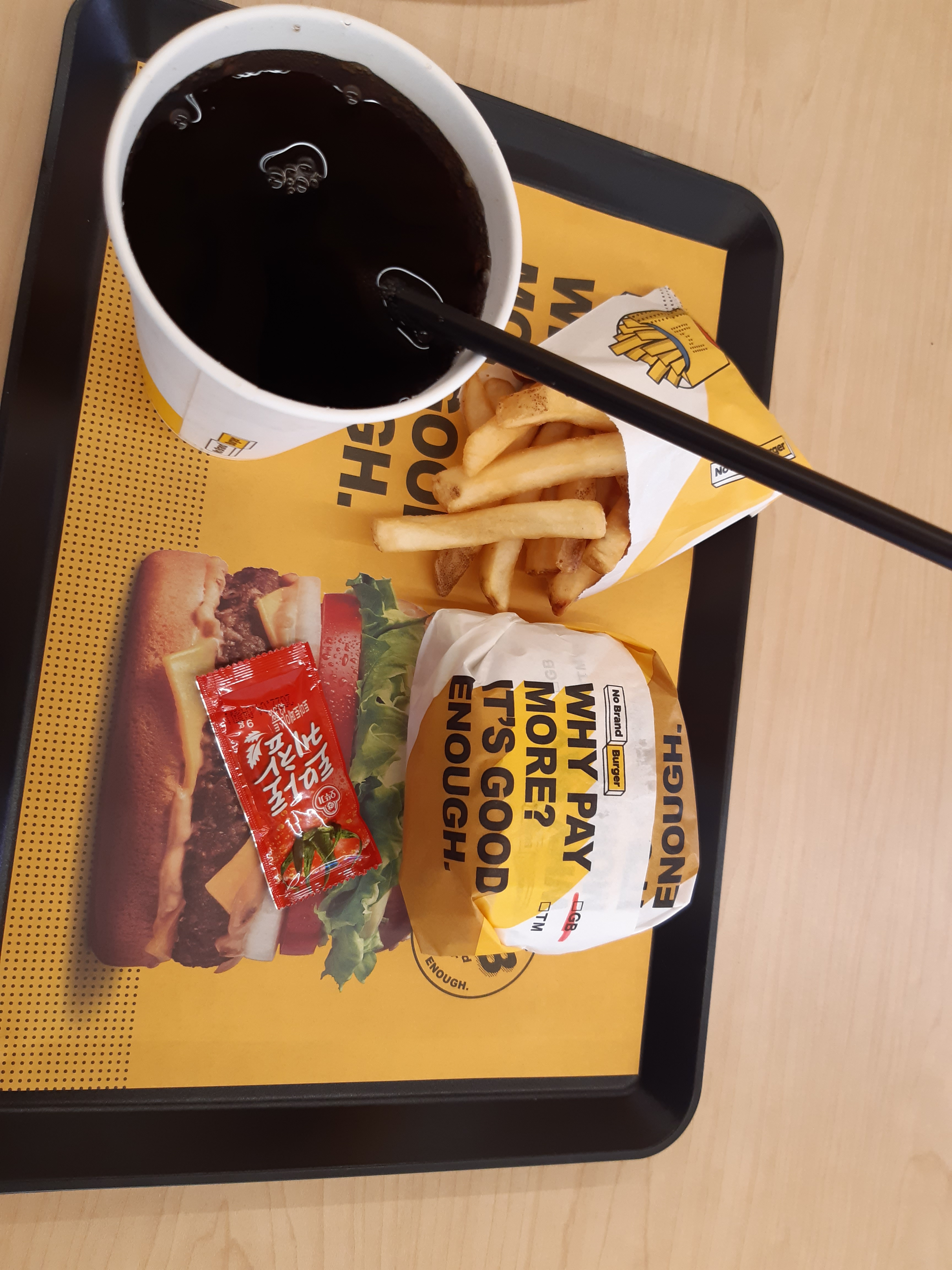
No Brand Burger's menu item

No Brand Burger is marketed as being affordable with the cheapest burger starting at 2,800 South Korean won (approximately 2.10 USD) and the most expensive burger costing 6,700 Won (approximately 5.00 USD). The hamburger patties and vegetables are supplied from its parent company, Shinsegae Foods. This self-sufficiency increases the operational efficiency making the low pricing possible. Shinsegae Foods had analyzed the consumer experiences from Burger Plant, its other burger chain, in order to develop No Brand Burger's menu.

Han Hyun-min, a South Korean celebrity, was chosen as the brand ambassador of No Brand Burger. He was featured in an advertisement parodying a scene from Dooly the Little Dinosaur.

It was announced in 2024 that Shinsegae Foods would focus its efforts on No Brand Burger, while ending its operation of Smoothie King Korea. However, one observer argued that the brand's presence was fairly low, as they had so few locations. That year, it began selling a Kimchi Burger.

== Locations ==
The First No Brand Burger restaurant opened in Hongdae in August 2019. There are 10 locations across Seoul, Incheon, and Gyeonggi Province as of January 2020. By 2024, it had around 250 stores.

== See also ==
- Shinsegae
- Mom's Touch Another South Korean fast food chain.
