= Incheon SSG Landers Field =

Baseball stadium in Incheon, South Korea

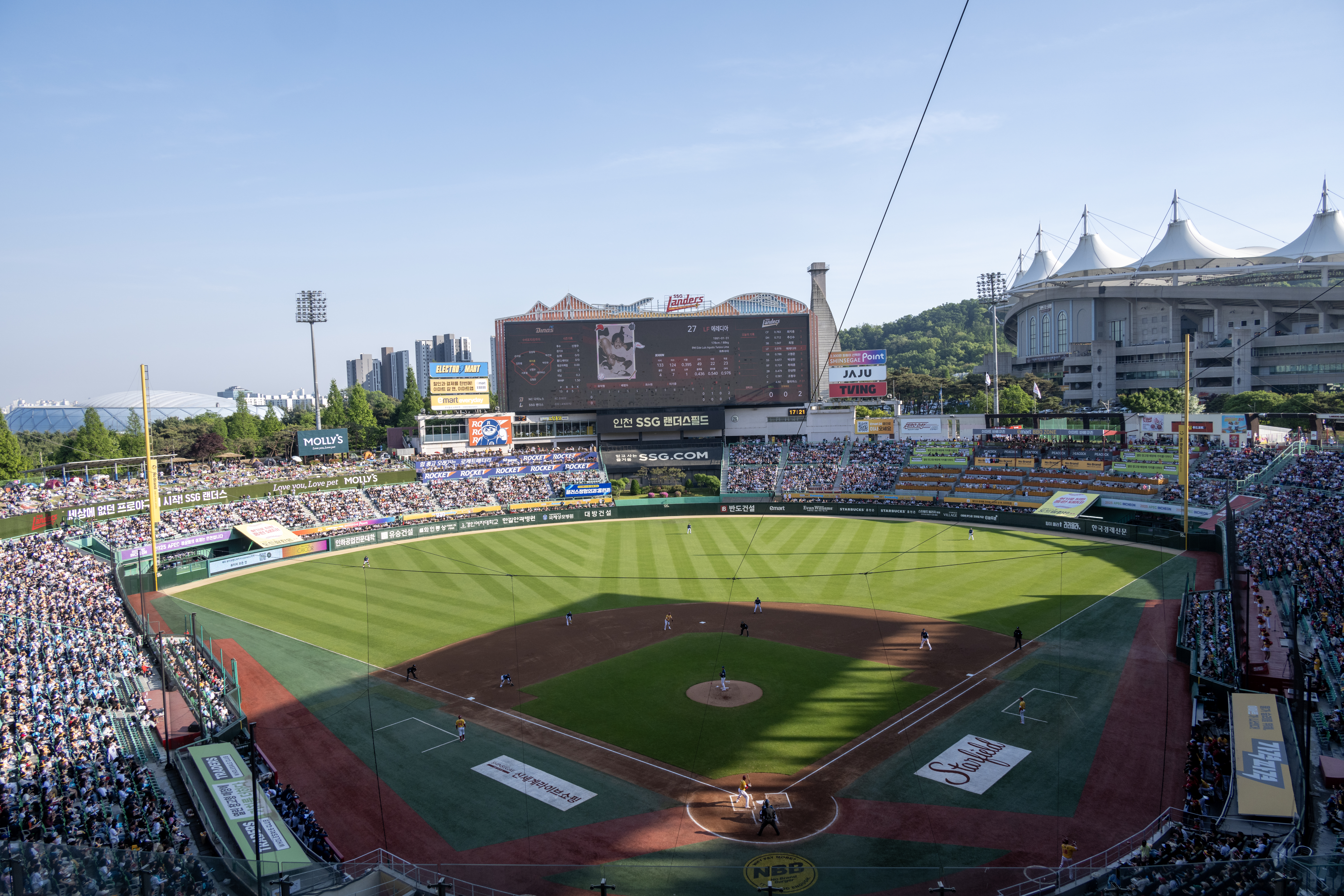
- Interactive map of Incheon SSG Landers Field
- Former names: Munhak Baseball Stadium (2002–2015); Incheon SK Happy Dream Park (2015–2021)
- Location: Incheon, South Korea
- Coordinates: 37°26′12.4″N 126°41′35.9″E
- Owner: Incheon Metropolitan City
- Operator: SSG Landers
- Capacity: 23,000
- Surface: Grass
- Field size: Left Field – 95 metres (312 ft); Left-Center – 115 metres (377 ft); Center Field – 120 metres (394 ft); Right-Center – 115 metres (377 ft); Right Field – 95 metres (312 ft); Outfield Wall Height – 2.8 metres (9 ft)

Construction
- Groundbreaking: July 20, 1994
- Opened: February 25, 2002
- Cost: ₩ 60.1 billion

Tenants
- SK Wyverns (2002–2020); SSG Landers (2021–present)

The Incheon SSG Landers Field (Korean: 인천 SSG 랜더스필드) is a baseball stadium located in Incheon, South Korea. Formerly named the Munhak Baseball Stadium, it is the home of the KBO League team SSG Landers. The stadium has been remodeled with Shinsegae affiliate brands, including Starbucks, No Brand Burger, and the convenience store e-mart 24. The SSG Landers Field has changed its main theme color to red and yellow, which represents the team's historical color used since the SK Wyverns. Also, the red color and yellow color respectively represent Shinsegae and e-mart as well.

== SSG affiliate brands at Landers Field ==
=== Starbucks ===
The Starbucks at SSG Landers Field is the first Starbucks ever to open inside a sports stadium. On April 3, 2021, Starbucks Korea released red reusable Starbucks cups that can only be purchased at the SSG Landers Field Starbucks. Starbucks Korea announced that they are planning to release more limited edition merchandise and develop special beverages and menus that are only available at SSG Landers Field.

=== No Brand Burger ===
Shinsegae announced the opening of the 100th No Brand Burger branch in SSG Landers Field on May 7, 2021. It is located on the first floor, next to the first base side ticket booth. No Brand Burger in SSG Landers Field launched new special menus that are only available at the baseball stadium. They released the Landers Pack and Randy Pack which are respectively named after the team and team's mascot.

== See also ==
- List of baseball stadiums in South Korea
