= Seth Frankoff =

American baseball player (born 1988)

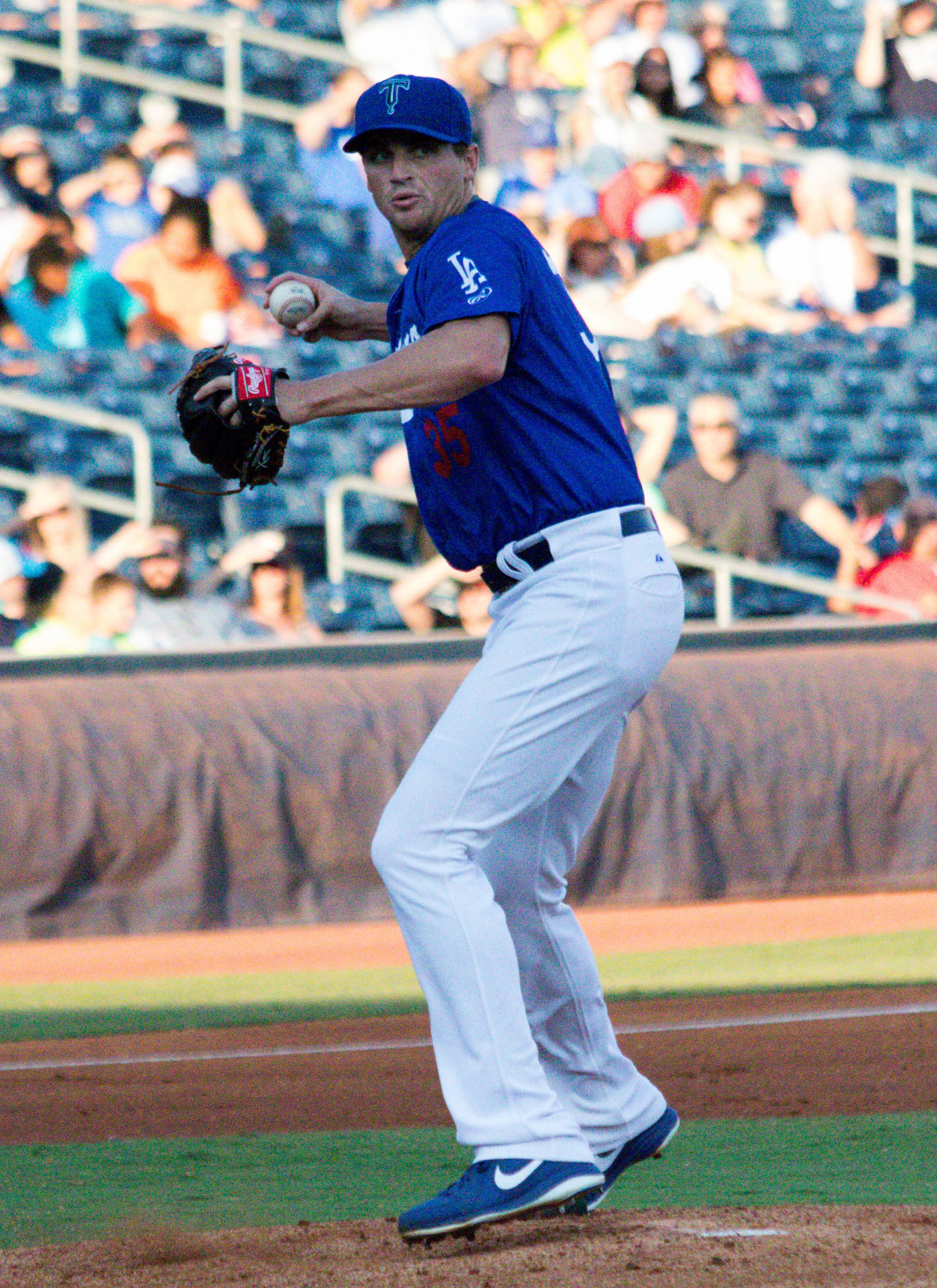
- Frankoff with the Tulsa Drillers in 2016
- Pitcher
- Born: August 27, 1988 (age 37); Raleigh, North Carolina, U.S.
- Batted: Right Threw: Right

Professional debut
- MLB: June 9, 2017, for the Chicago Cubs
- KBO: March 27, 2018, for the Doosan Bears

Last appearance
- MLB: June 3, 2021, for the Arizona Diamondbacks
- KBO: October 1, 2019, for the Doosan Bears

MLB statistics
- Win–loss record: 0–3
- Earned run average: 10.24
- Strikeouts: 13

KBO statistics
- Win–loss record: 27–11
- Earned run average: 3.68
- Strikeouts: 245
- Stats at Baseball Reference

Teams
- Chicago Cubs (2017); Doosan Bears (2018–2019); Seattle Mariners (2020); Arizona Diamondbacks (2021)

Career highlights and awards
- Korean Series champion (2019); KBO Wins leader (2018)

James Seth Frankoff (born August 27, 1988) is an American former professional baseball pitcher. He played in Major League Baseball (MLB) for the Chicago Cubs, Seattle Mariners and Arizona Diamondbacks and in the KBO League for the Doosan Bears.

== Career ==
He was born in Raleigh, North Carolina and attended Apex High School before attending University of North Carolina at Wilmington. In 2007, he was a member of the United States national baseball team.

=== Oakland Athletics ===
He was drafted by the Oakland Athletics in the 27th round of the 2010 Major League Baseball draft. He made his professional debut in 2010 with the AZL Athletics, and also played for the Low-A Vancouver Canadians, recording a 5–5 record and 2.81 ERA. He split the next year between the Single-A Burlington Bees and Vancouver, accumulating a 6–4 record and 3.60 ERA in 19 appearances. He remained in Burlington for the 2012 season and was a Mid-season All-Star. In 2013, Frankoff played for the High-A Stockton Ports, pitching to a 2–0 record and 2.78 ERA with 93 strikeouts. He split the 2014 season between the Double-A Midland RockHounds and the Triple-A Sacramento River Cats, recording a 3–3 record and 3.36 ERA, and was also a Mid-season All-star for Midland. He split the 2015 season between Midland and the Triple-A Nashville Sounds, pitching to a 3.71 ERA with 57 strikeouts in 47 games. On March 30, 2016, Frankoff was released by the Athletics organization.

=== Los Angeles Dodgers ===
On April 5, 2016, Frankoff signed a minor league contract with the Los Angeles Dodgers organization. He split the year between the Triple–A Oklahoma City Dodgers and the Double–A Tulsa Drillers, accumulating a 4–4 record and 3.89 ERA in 28 total games. Frankoff elected free agency following the season on November 7.

=== Chicago Cubs ===
On November 16, 2016, Frankoff signed a minor league contract with the Chicago Cubs organization. One source said, "he checks most of the boxes ... he rarely walks hitters, which is a standard draw for the Cubs brass," in explaining why Chicago signed him.

On June 8, 2017, Frankoff was selected to the 40-man roster and promoted to the major leagues for the first time. He made his major league debut on June 9, 2017, against the Colorado Rockies relieving in the fifth inning. He allowed two runs in two innings before being optioned down the next day. On September 1, 2017, Frankoff was designated for assignment.

=== Seattle Mariners ===
On September 4, 2017, Frankoff was claimed off waivers by the Seattle Mariners. Frankoff was granted his release by the Mariners on December 10, in order to pursue pitching opportunities in South Korea.

=== Doosan Bears ===
Frankoff signed with the Doosan Bears of the KBO League on December 12, 2017. In 2018 for the Bears, he recorded an 18–3 record and 3.74 ERA in 28 games. On December 20, 2018, Frankoff re-signed with Doosan for the 2019 season. He pitched to a 9–8 record and 3.61 ERA in 2019 and became a free agent after the year.

=== Seattle Mariners (second stint) ===
On February 14, 2020, Frankoff signed a minor league contract with the San Diego Padres organization. Frankoff elected free agency on July 14, 2020.

On August 11, 2020, Frankoff signed a minor league contract with the Seattle Mariners. On August 30, Frankoff's contract was selected to the active roster. He recorded a ghastly 16.88 ERA in 2 games in 2020. On October 19, Frankoff was outrighted off of the 40-man roster and assigned to the Triple-A Tacoma Rainiers He became a free agent on November 2.

=== Arizona Diamondbacks ===
On January 8, 2021, Frankoff signed a minor league contract with the Arizona Diamondbacks organization. On May 12, Frankoff was selected to the active roster. On June 15, he was placed on the 60-day injured list with right forearm soreness. On September 8, Frankoff was released by the Diamondbacks. Frankoff had posted a 9.20 ERA in 4 appearances for Arizona.

=== Diablos Rojos del México ===
On May 10, 2022, Frankoff signed with the Diablos Rojos del México of the Mexican League. In 2 starts, he registered an 0–1 record with a 12.00 ERA in 6 total innings. Frankoff was released on May 30.

=== High Point Rockers ===
On September 1, 2022, Frankoff signed with the High Point Rockers of the Atlantic League of Professional Baseball. In 4 games for High Point, Frankoff pitched to a 4.76 ERA with 7 strikeouts across 5 2/3 innings of work. He became a free agent after the season.

On June 9, 2023, Frankoff announced his retirement from professional baseball via Instagram.
