= Jung Jin-ho (baseball) =

South Korean baseball player

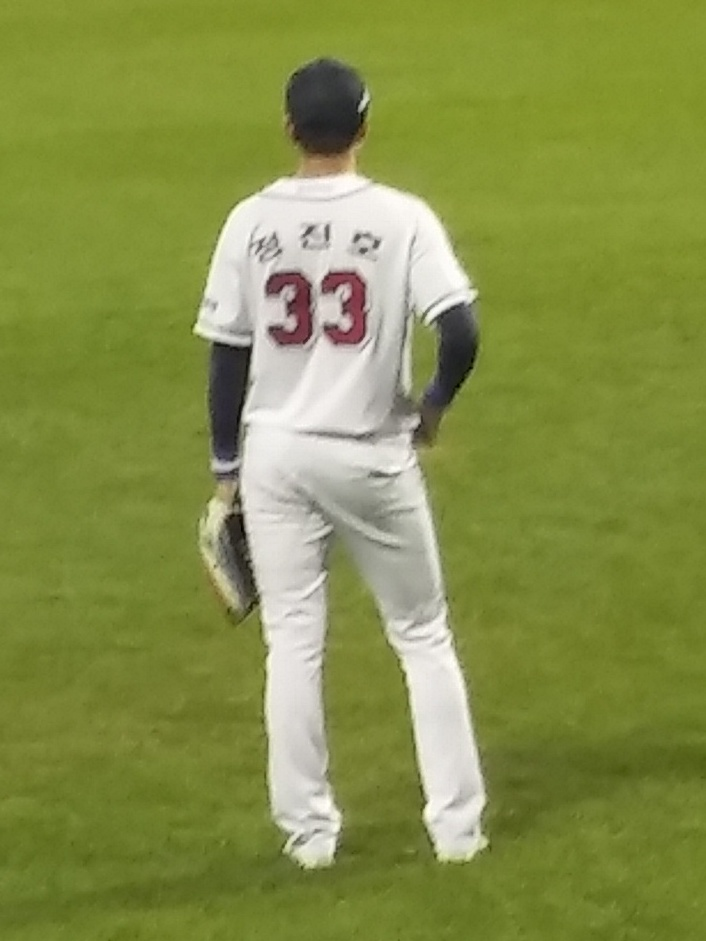
- Outfielder
- Born: 2 October 1988 (age 37); Seoul, South Korea
- Bats: Left Throws: Right

KBO debut
- April 3, 2011, for the Doosan Bears

KBO statistics
- Batting average: .261
- Home runs: 14
- Runs batted in: 134
- Stats at Baseball Reference

Teams
- Doosan Bears (2011–2019); Sangmu Phoenix (2013–2014) (army); Hanhwa Eagles (2020–2021)

Career highlights and awards
- Korean Series champion (2019); Hit for the cycle (2017)

Jung jin-ho (Korean: 정진호; Hanja: 鄭振浩; born 2 October 1988) is a retired South Korean professional baseball outfielder. His major position was right field, though he sometimes played as center fielder or left fielder.

He graduated from Chung-Ang University and was selected by the Doosan Bears in the 2011 draft (2nd draft, 5th round).

On 7 June 2017, Jung hit for the 23rd cycle in KBO League history against the Samsung Lions. He is the first player to hit for the cycle in the KBO's minimum innings (5 innings). On 1 May 2018, he hit the 84th inside-the-park home run in KBO history; he did this against the KT Wiz.
