= Kiwoom Heroes =

Korea Baseball Championship franchise in Seoul, South Korea

- 키움 히어로즈

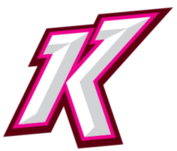
Logo	Cap insignia

Information
- League: KBO League (2008–present)
- Location: Seoul
- Ballpark: Gocheok Sky Dome (2016–present)
- Established: 2008; 18 years ago
- Former name: Woori Heroes (2008); Seoul Heroes (2008–2009); Nexen Heroes (2010–2018)
- Former ballpark: Mokdong Baseball Stadium (2008–2015)
- Colors: Burgundy, white and grey
- Mascot: Dongeuli, Tuckdori, DomDomI
- Manager: Seol Jong-jin
- Website: www.heroesbaseball.co.kr

Current uniforms

The Kiwoom Heroes (Korean: 키움 히어로즈; RR: Kium Hieolojeu) are a South Korean professional baseball team based in Seoul. They are a member of the KBO League. The Heroes play their home games at Gocheok Sky Dome in Gocheok-dong, a neighborhood located in the southwestern part of Seoul.

In 2014, the Futures League squad changed its name to Hwaseong Heroes (화성 히어로즈), differentiating from the first string. In 2019, Hwaseong Heroes renamed as Goyang Heroes (고양 히어로즈).

== History ==
The franchise was originally known as the Sammi SuperStars and had subsequent incarnations as the Chungbo Pintos and Pacific Dolphins. The team was renamed the Hyundai Unicorns after being sold to Hyundai in 1996, and was relocated from Incheon to Suwon. The Unicorns won the KBO championship four times (1998, 2000, 2003 and 2004).

In January 2008, the team was disbanded. After that, Centennial Investments formed a new team called Woori Heroes. Unlike other clubs in the KBO League, which are controlled by chaebol companies, the Heroes are owned by a group of individuals led by Lee Chang-suk, rather than being owned by their title sponsor. During the 2008 season, Woori Tobacco Company terminated their naming sponsor agreement, citing that the Heroes had not yet paid the full KBO founding fee, forcing the team to trade most of its star players for money. For the remainder of the 2008 season and into the 2009 season, the team used only "Heroes" as their name.

On 8 February 2010, naming rights were sold to Nexen Tire.

On 6 November 2018, naming rights were sold to Kiwoom Securities. The Kiwoom Heroes made it to the Korean Series in their first year, but lost to the Doosan Bears to finish second.

== Season-by-season records ==
Year	Stadium	Rank	Regular season									Postseason	Awards
Year	Stadium	Rank	Standings	Games	W	L	D	Win%	BA	HR	ERA	Postseason	Awards
2008	Mokdong; Baseball Stadium	7/8		126	50	76	0	.397	.266	70	4.43	Did not qualify	
2009	Mokdong; Baseball Stadium	6/8		133	60	72	1	.451	.272	153	5.40	Did not qualify	
2010	Mokdong; Baseball Stadium	7/8		133	52	78	3	.391	.262	87	4.55	Did not qualify	
2011	Mokdong; Baseball Stadium	8/8		133	51	80	2	.389	.245	79	4.36	Did not qualify	
2012	Mokdong; Baseball Stadium	6/8		133	61	69	3	.469	.243	102	3.83	Did not qualify	Park Byung-ho (MVP); Seo Geon-chang (ROTY)
2013	Mokdong; Baseball Stadium	4/9	3/9	128	72	54	2	.571	.272	125	4.12	Lost semi-playoff vs. Doosan Bears (2–3)	Park Byung-ho (MVP)
2014	Mokdong; Baseball Stadium	2/9	2/9	128	78	48	2	.619	.298	199	5.25	Won playoff vs. LG Twins (3–1); Lost Korean Series vs. Samsung Lions (2–4)	Seo Geon-chang (MVP)
2015	Mokdong; Baseball Stadium	4/10	4/10	144	78	65	1	.545	.298	203	4.91	Won wild card vs. SK Wyverns (1–0); Lost semi-playoff vs. Doosan Bears (1–3)	
2016	Gocheok; Sky Dome	3/10	3/10	144	77	66	1	.538	.293	134	4.96	Lost semi-playoff vs. LG Twins (1–3)	Shin Jae-young (ROTY)
2017	Gocheok; Sky Dome	7/10		144	69	73	2	.486	.290	141	5.03	Did not qualify	Lee Jung-hoo (ROTY)
2018	Gocheok; Sky Dome	4/10	4/10	144	75	69	0	.521	.288	165	5.08	Won wild card vs. Kia Tigers (1–0); Won semi-playoff vs. Hanwha Eagles (3–1); Lost playoff vs. SK Wyverns (2–3)	
2019	Gocheok; Sky Dome	2/10	3/10	144	86	57	1	.601	.282	112	3.61	Won semi-playoff vs. LG Twins (3–1); Won playoff vs. SK Wyverns (3–0); Lost Korean Series vs. Doosan Bears (0–4)	
2020	Gocheok; Sky Dome	5/10	5/10	144	80	63	1	.559	.269	127	4.39	Lost wild card vs. LG Twins (0–1)	
2021	Gocheok; Sky Dome	5/10	5/10	144	70	67	7	.511	.259	91	4.31	Lost wild card vs. Doosan Bears (1–1)	
2022	Gocheok; Sky Dome	2/10	3/10	144	80	62	2	.563	.252	94	3.79	Won semi-playoff vs. KT Wiz (3–2); Won playoff vs. LG Twins (3–1); Lost Korean Series vs. SSG Landers (2–4)	Lee Jung-hoo (MVP)
2023	Gocheok; Sky Dome	10/10		144	58	83	3	.411	.261	61	4.41	Did not qualify	
2024	Gocheok; Sky Dome	10/10		144	58	86	0	.403	.264	104	5.16	Did not qualify	
2025	Gocheok; Sky Dome	10/10		144	47	93	4	.336	.244	104	5.39	Did not qualify	
2026	Gocheok; Sky Dome	10/10		144	50	90	4	.357	.244	115	5.30	Did not qualify	

== Managers ==
- Lee Kwang-hwan (2008)
- Kim Si-jin (2009–2012)
- Kim Sung-gap (2012) (caretaker)
- Youm Kyoung-youb (2013–2016)
- Jang Jeong-seok (2017–2019)
- Son Heuk (2020)
- Kim Chang-hyun (2020) (caretaker)
- Hong Won-ki (2021–2025)
- Seol Jong-jin (2025–present)
