= SSG Landers =

South Korean professional baseball team

- SSG 랜더스
Logo
Cap insignia

Information
- League: KBO League
- Location: Incheon
- Ballpark: Incheon SSG Landers Field (2002–present)
- Founded: 2000; 26 years ago
- Korean Series championships: 2007, 2008, 2010, 2018, 2022
- League championships: 2007, 2008, 2010, 2022
- Former name: SK Wyverns (2000–2020)
- Colors: Charismatic red, white, yellow
- Retired numbers: 26
- Ownership: Shinsegae
- Manager: Lee Soong-yong
- Website: www.ssglanders.com

SSG Landers (Korean: SSG 랜더스) are a South Korean professional baseball team. The team was originally established as the SK Wyverns but was renamed as the SSG Landers in 2021 after Shinsegae acquired the team from SK Group. They are a member of the KBO League. Based in Incheon, they play their home games at Incheon SSG Landers Field.

== History ==
=== 2000: Formation (SK Wyverns) ===
In the 2000 season, the Ssangbangwool Raiders, a team that had represented the Jeollabuk-do region since 1990, was dissolved because of the bankruptcy of the Ssangbangwool Group, the team's owner. The franchise was subsumed by the KBO League, which then awarded a new franchise to the SK conglomerate. The new franchise was named the SK Wyverns (a wyvern is a type of dragon). The Raiders and the Wyverns had no historical links, although the new team consisted mostly of former Raiders players.

The Hyundai Unicorns moved out of Incheon and wanted to relocate to Seoul, but failed because of the resistance of the Doosan Bears and the LG Twins; the Unicorns then moved to Suwon, with the SK Wyverns filling the void left in Incheon.

=== 2001–2006 ===
The Wyverns' first Korean Series appearance came in 2003, where they were defeated by the Hyundai Unicorns in seven games.

=== 2007 ===
In 2007, SK defeated the Doosan Bears in six games to win the 2007 Korean Series – the first time the franchise had won the Korean Series – after finishing the season in first place. They became the first team in Korean Series history to win after losing the first two games. Designated Hitter Kim Jae-hyun was the series MVP.

SK went on to compete in the Konami Cup, a short competition between the champions of the Korean Baseball League, the Japanese Baseball League, the Taiwanese Baseball League, and the China All-Stars. On 8 November 2007, SK Wyverns defeated the Chunichi Dragons (6–3), giving Chunichi their first-ever loss in Konami Cup history. On 9 November 2007, SK soundly defeated the China All-Stars (13–0), causing the game to be called in the seventh inning due to the mercy rule. On 10 November 2007, the Wyverns repeated their performance, defeating the Uni-President 7-Eleven Lions of Taiwan (13–1) in seven innings. The final game, on 11 November 2007, was a rematch of the first game, between the Chunichi Dragons and the SK Wyverns. In a close game, Chunichi won the game, 6–5.

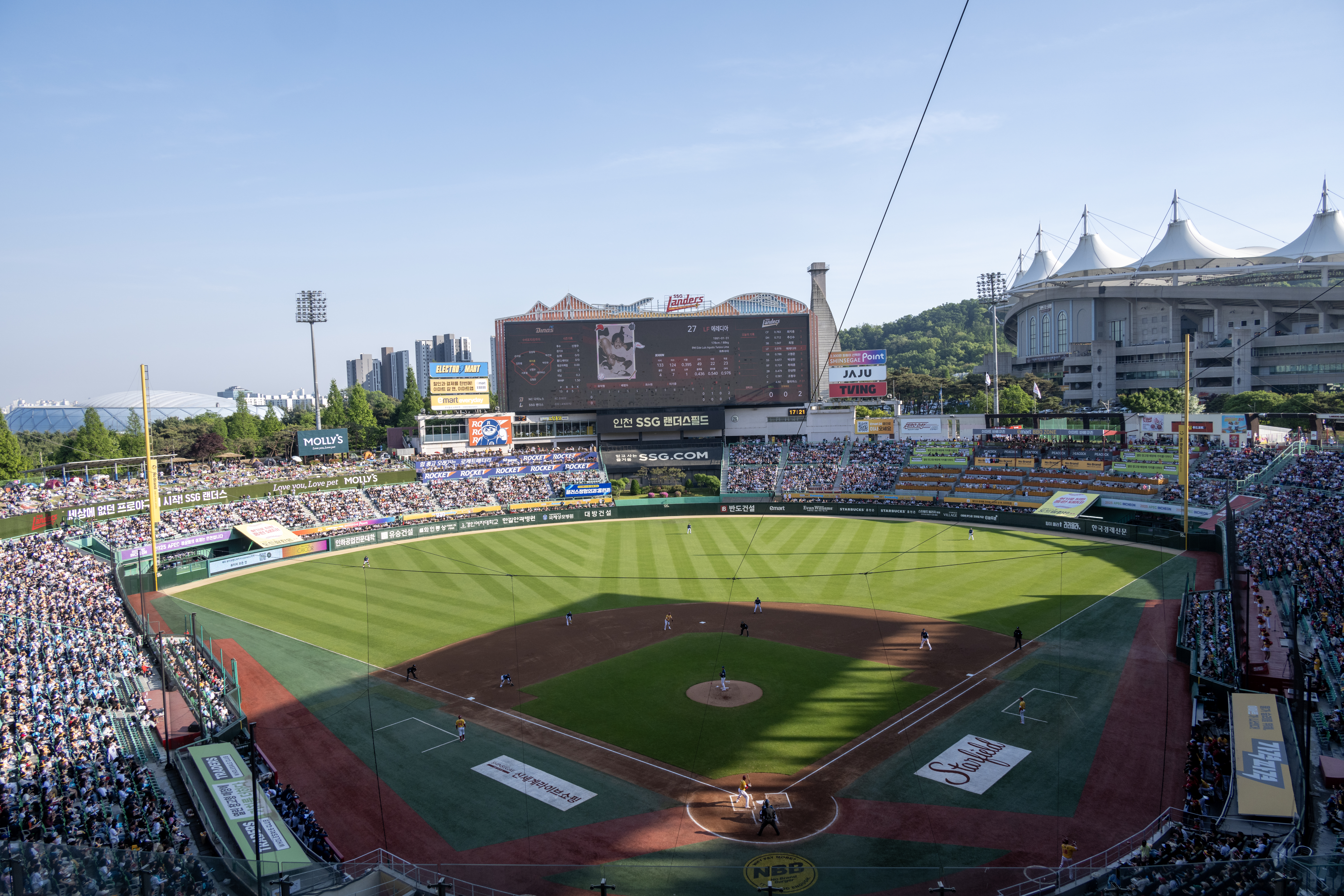
Incheon SSG Landers Field, home field of the SSG Landers

=== 2008 ===
SK went 83–43–0 in 2008, with a winning percentage of .659, the highest in KBO League history at the time. The team went to the Korean Series again, once again facing their main rivals, the Doosan Bears. In a repeat of 2007, SK defeated Doosan to win their second Korean Series championship. Choi Jeong was named the 2008 Korean Series MVP.

SK once again went on to compete in the Konami Cup. On 13 November 2008, SK Wyverns defeated the Seibu Lions (4–3), marking the second straight year in which the Korean champions handed the Japanese champions a loss in this competition. On 14 November 2008, they once again defeated the Chinese representatives, the Tianjin Lions, in a mercy-rule shortened game. On 15 November 2008, however, they were defeated in a rematch with Uni-President 7-Eleven Lions of Taiwan (10–4) and failed to qualify for the championship game for a second straight year.

=== 2009–2020 ===
In 2009, however, SK were runners-up in the 2009 KBO season and 2009 Korean Series, where they were defeated by the KIA Tigers in seven games.

SK rebounded to form in 2010, dominating the regular season and winning the Korean Series in a 4–0 sweep against the Samsung Lions. It was SK's fourth straight Korean Series appearance and their third title in four years. The Wyverns also had a 22-game winning streak that ended in April 2010, the longest winning streak in Korean Baseball.

In 2011, manager Kim Sung-keun was ousted mid-season after a long-standing disagreement between him and the SK front office. This led to then-head coach Lee Man-soo taking over the reins – a move that brought a lot of protests from the SK Wyverns fans, as Kim had led SK to the Korean Series in every year that he had been at the helm.

In both 2011 and 2012, SK reached the Korean Series, where they were both times defeated by the Samsung Lions. SK reached the Korean Series in every season from 2007 to 2012 (six straight seasons).

In 2018, SK faced the Doosan Bears again in the Korean Series and won another championship. This was their fourth win, and three of four wins against Doosan.

=== 2021–present (SSG Landers) ===
In January 2021, Shinsegae said it would acquire a professional baseball club owned by SK Group as it sought to boost marketing with the sports team. Shinsegae announced that it would buy the SK Wyverns baseball club from SK Telecom for 135.2 billion won ($122 million), with Shinsegae's e-mart taking over the team's management. The group paid 100 billion won for a 100-percent stake in the club and 35.2 billion won for facilities and properties. The e-mart-run baseball club was launched in March with a new name, emblem and character. The deal was finalized on 23 February 2021. The Landers finished in sixth place in their first season, with a 66–64–14 record. The following season, however, SSG Landers won the regular season championship with 88 wins out of 144 games, which was their fourth regular season title and the first in SSG era. They subsequently won the 2022 Korean Series, their fifth championship, after defeating Kiwoom Heroes 4–2 in the finals.

On 15 January 2024, ahead of the 2024 KBO League season, the Landers unveiled a new logo and corresponding uniform design. The new logo was designed in collaboration with American sports logo designers Todd Radom and Bill Frederick.

== Culture ==
SSG Landers has benefited economically and gained positive public opinions from the fans and society through successful green campaigns. SSG Landers developed a uniform from recycled polyester. Instead of their team logo on the front, they have dedicated the center spot of the uniform to the slogan "Let’s go green". Even though the team’s traditional colors were red, yellow, and orange they used green for the special uniform.

Also, they changed their home stadium into a green theme park. They added green seats in the outfield seat sections, and also installed solar panels and switched to eco-friendly machines. For example, they changed their original bullpen cart to an electric cart.

The green theme extends to fan events. Fans that used bikes to get to the stadium received discounted tickets. By contributing to the social good and taking social responsibility for the environment, SK Wyverns has received more attention and recognition from the public.

== Season-by-season records ==
Year	Stadium	Rank	Regular season									Postseason	Awards
Year	Stadium	Rank	Standings	Games	Wins	Losses	Draws	Win%	BA	HR	ERA	Postseason	Awards
SK Wyverns
2000	Sungui; Baseball Stadium	8/8	4/4	133	44	86	3	.338	.260	105	5.99	Did not qualify	Lee Seung-ho (ROTY)
2001	Sungui; Baseball Stadium	7/8		133	60	71	2	.458	.260	113	4.41	Did not qualify	
2002	Munhak; Baseball Stadium	6/8		133	61	69	3	.469	.270	158	4.47	Did not qualify	
2003	Munhak; Baseball Stadium	2/8	4/8	133	66	64	3	.508	.272	156	4.44	Won semi-playoff vs. Samsung Lions (2–0); Won playoff vs. Kia Tigers (3–0); Lost Korean Series vs. Hyundai Unicorns (3–4)	
2004	Munhak; Baseball Stadium	5/8		133	61	64	8	.488	.272	138	4.40	Did not qualify	
2005	Munhak; Baseball Stadium	3/8	3/8	126	70	50	6	.583	.269	122	3.41	Lost semi-playoff vs. Hanwha Eagles (2–3)	
2006	Munhak; Baseball Stadium	6/8		126	60	65	1	.480	.254	99	3.80	Did not qualify	
2007	Munhak; Baseball Stadium	1/8	1/8	126	73	48	5	.603	.264	112	3.24	Won Korean Series vs. Doosan Bears (4–2)	
2008	Munhak; Baseball Stadium	1/8	1/8	126	83	43	0	.659	.282	89	3.22	Won Korean Series vs. Doosan Bears (4–1)	Kim Kwang-hyun (MVP)
2009	Munhak; Baseball Stadium	2/8	2/8	133	80	47	6	.602	.285	166	3.67	Won playoff vs. Doosan Bears (3–2); Lost Korean Series vs. Kia Tigers (3–4)	
2010	Munhak; Baseball Stadium	1/8	1/8	133	84	47	2	.641	.274	120	3.71	Won Korean Series vs. Samsung Lions (4–0)	
2011	Munhak; Baseball Stadium	2/8	3/8	133	71	59	3	.546	.263	100	3.59	Won semi-playoff vs. Kia Tigers (3–1); Won playoff vs. Lotte Giants (3–2); Lost Korean Series vs. Samsung Lions (1–4)	
2012	Munhak; Baseball Stadium	2/8	2/8	133	71	59	3	.546	.258	108	3.82	Won playoff vs. Lotte Giants (3–2); Lost Korean Series vs. Samsung Lions (2–4)	
2013	Munhak; Baseball Stadium	6/9		128	62	63	3	.496	.265	124	4.16	Did not qualify	
2014	Munhak; Baseball Stadium	5/9		128	61	65	2	.484	.291	115	5.51	Did not qualify	
2015	Incheon SK; Happy Dream Park	5/10	5/10	144	69	73	2	.486	.272	145	4.71	Lost wild card vs. Nexen Heroes (0–1)	
2016	Incheon SK; Happy Dream Park	6/10		144	69	75	0	.479	.291	182	4.87	Did not qualify	
2017	Incheon SK; Happy Dream Park	5/10	5/10	144	75	68	1	.524	.271	234	5.02	Lost wild card vs. NC Dinos (0–1)	
2018	Incheon SK; Happy Dream Park	1/10	2/10	144	78	65	1	.545	.281	233	4.67	Won playoff vs. Nexen Heroes (3–2); Won Korean Series vs. Doosan Bears (4–2)	
2019	Incheon SK; Happy Dream Park	3/10	2/10	144	88	55	1	.615	.262	117	3.48	Lost playoff vs. Kiwoom Heroes (0–3)	
2020	Incheon SK; Happy Dream Park	9/10		144	51	92	1	.357	.250	143	5.57	Did not qualify	
SSG Landers
2021	Incheon; SSG Landers Field	6/10		144	66	64	14	.508	.261	185	4.82	Did not qualify	
2022	Incheon; SSG Landers Field	1/10	1/10	144	88	52	4	.629	.254	138	3.87	Won Korean Series vs. Kiwoom Heroes (4–2)	
2023	Incheon; SSG Landers Field	3/10	3/10	144	76	65	3	.539	.260	125	4.37	Lost semi-playoff vs. NC Dinos (0–3)	
2024	Incheon; SSG Landers Field	6/10		144	72	70	2	.507	.273	152	5.25	Did not qualify	
2025	Incheon; SSG Landers Field	3/10	3/10	144	75	65	4	.536	.256	127	3.63	Lost semi-playoff vs. Samsung Lions (1–3)	
2026	Incheon; SSG Landers Field	6/10		144	65	74	5	.468	.259	143	5.16	Did not qualify	

== Managers ==
- Kang Byeong-cheol (2000–2002)
- Cho Bum-hyun (2002–2006)
- Kim Sung-keun (2006–2011)
- Lee Man-soo (2011–2014)
- Kim Yong-hee (2014–2016)
- Trey Hillman (2016–2018)
- Youm Kyoung-youb (2018–2020)
- Park Kyung-oan (2020) (caretaker)
- Kim Won-hyong (2021–2023)
- Lee Soong-yong (2023–present)
