= 2015 Korean Series =

- Tire Bank Korean Series 2015
Team (Wins)	Manager(s)	Season
Doosan Bears (4)	Kim Tae-hyeong	(3) 79–0–65, .549, 9 GB
Samsung Lions (1)	Ryu Joong-il	(1) 88–0–56, .611, 2½ GA
- Dates: October 26–31
- MVP: Jung Soo-bin

The 2015 Korean Series was the championship series of the 2015 KBO League season. The Samsung Lions, four-time consecutive defending champions, played the winner of the playoff series, the Doosan Bears. The Doosan Bears defeated the regular season champions, the Samsung Lions in five games to win their fourth Korean Series championship.

== Roster ==
Samsung Lions
Roster
Pitchers: 11 Jo Hyun-kun; 13 Jang Won-sam; 15 Shin Yong-woon; 23 Cha Woo-chan; 25 Tyler Cloyd; 29 Baek Jung-hyun; 30 Kim Ki-tae; 44 Alfredo Fígaro; 45 Kwon Oh-jun; 52 Jung In-wook; 55 Sim Chang-min; 61 Park Geun-hong	Catchers: 56 Lee Ji-young; 48 Lee Heung-ryun; Infielders: 0 Kim Jae-hyun; 3 Back Sang-won; 7 Kim Sang-su; 12 Yamaico Navarro; 17 Chae Tae-in; 18 Park Seok-min; 36 Lee Seung-yuop; 65 Koo Ja-wook	Outfielders: 33 Park Han-yi; 34 Choi Hyoung-woo; 53 Bae Young-seop; 58 Park Hae-min; 59 Park Chan-do; 93 Choi Seon-ho	Manager: 75 Ryu Joong-il; Coaches: 80 Kim Seong-rae; 71 Kim Pyeong-ho; 73 Kim Jae-gul; 78 Kim Yong-kook; 82 Kim Tae-han; 88 Ken Kadokura; 83 Kang Seong-woo; 86 Kim Han-soo

Doosan Bears
Roster
Pitchers: 40 Dustin Nippert; 29 Yoo Hee-kwan; 28 Chang Won-jun; 57 Lee Hyeon-ho; 61 Ham Deok-ju; 35 Jin Ya-kop; 38 Noh Kyung-eun; 42 Yun Myung-jun; 48 Lee Hyun-seung; 15 Oh Hyun-taek; 64 Nam Kyeong-ho; 56 Heo Jun-hyeok	Catchers: 25 Yang Eui-ji; 12 Choi Jae-hoon; Infielders: 13 Hur Kyoung-min; 66 Kim Dong-han; 52 Kim Jae-ho; 17 Oh Jae-won; 7 Choi Ju-hwan; 36 Oh Jae-il; 14 Ko Young-min; 3 Deibinson Romero; 22 Hong Sung-heun	Outfielders: 50 Kim Hyun-soo; 31 Jung Soo-bin; 62 Jang Min-seok; 49 Min Byung-hun; 37 Park Keon-u	Manager: 88 Kim Tae-hyoung; Coaches: 74 Yoo Ji-hwun; 87 Park Cheol-woo; 89 Han Yong-deok; 75 Kwon Myung-chul; 77 Jeon Hyung-do; 86 Kang Seok-cheon; 82 Kang Yin-kwon; 81 Kang Dong-woo

== Summary ==
Doosan Bears won the series, 4–1.

Game	Date	Score	Location	Time	Attendance
1	October 26	Doosan Bears 8 – 9 Samsung Lions	Daegu Baseball Stadium, Daegu	3:46	10,000
2	October 27	Doosan Bears 6 – 1 Samsung Lions	Daegu Baseball Stadium, Daegu	3:06	10,000
3	October 29	Samsung Lions 1 – 5 Doosan Bears	Jamsil Baseball Stadium, Seoul	3:22	25,000
4	October 30	Samsung Lions 3 – 4 Doosan Bears	Jamsil Baseball Stadium, Seoul	3:21	25,000
5	October 31	Samsung Lions 2 – 13 Doosan Bears	Jamsil Baseball Stadium, Seoul	3:32	25,000

== Matchups ==
=== Game 1 ===
Monday, October 26, 2015 6:30 p.m. (KST) at Daegu Baseball Stadium in Daegu
Team	1	2	3	4	5	6	7	8	9	R	H	E
Doosan Bears	2	3	0	1	0	2	0	0	0	8	13	1
Samsung Lions	0	0	2	2	0	0	5	0	X	9	11	0
WP: Baek Jung-hyun (1–0) LP: Lee Hyun-seung (0–1) Sv: Cha Woo-chan (1); Home runs: DOO: Hur Kyoung-min (1); SAM: Park Seok-min (1), Yamaico Navarro (1); Attendance: 10,000; Boxscore

=== Game 2 ===
Tuesday, October 27, 2015 6:30 p.m. (KST) at Daegu Baseball Stadium in Daegu
Team	1	2	3	4	5	6	7	8	9	R	H	E
Doosan Bears	0	0	0	0	4	0	1	1	0	6	9	2
Samsung Lions	0	0	0	0	0	0	0	0	1	1	6	0
WP: Dustin Nippert (1–0) LP: Jang Won-sam (0–1); Attendance: 10,000; Boxscore

=== Game 3 ===
Thursday, October 29, 2015 6:30 p.m. (KST) at Jamsil Baseball Stadium in Seoul
Team	1	2	3	4	5	6	7	8	9	R	H	E
Samsung Lions	1	0	0	0	0	0	0	0	0	1	8	1
Doosan Bears	0	0	0	2	1	2	0	0	X	5	6	0
WP: Jang Won-jun (1–0) LP: Tyler Cloyd (0–1); Attendance: 25,000; Boxscore

=== Game 4 ===
Friday, October 30, 2015 6:30 p.m. (KST) at Jamsil Baseball Stadium in Seoul
Team	1	2	3	4	5	6	7	8	9	R	H	E
Samsung Lions	0	3	0	0	0	0	0	0	0	3	9	1
Doosan Bears	2	0	0	1	1	0	0	0	X	4	9	1
WP: Noh Kyung-eun (1–0) LP: Alfredo Fígaro (0–1) Sv: Lee Hyun-seung (1); Attendance: 25,000; Boxscore

=== Game 5 ===
Saturday, October 31, 2015 2:00 p.m. (KST) at Jamsil Baseball Stadium in Seoul
Team	1	2	3	4	5	6	7	8	9	R	H	E
Samsung Lions	0	0	0	1	0	0	1	0	0	2	9	0
Doosan Bears	2	0	5	0	2	0	3	1	X	13	17	0
WP: Yoo Hee-kwan (1–0) LP: Jang Won-sam (0–2); Home runs: SAM: None; DOO: Jung Soo-bin (1); Attendance: 25,000; Boxscore

2015 Korean Series Champion

Doosan Bears
(Fourth title)

== See also ==
- 2015 KBO League season
- 2015 World Series
- 2015 Japan Series
