= Choi Dong-won Award =

South Korean baseball award

The Choi Dong-won Award is a baseball award in South Korea, bestowed upon the top starting pitcher in the KBO League each year.

== Winners ==
Year	Pitcher	Team	Innings	W-L	Saves^{[C]}	ERA	K's	Ref
2014	Yang Hyeon-jong	Kia Tigers	171 1/3	16-8	0	4.25	165	
2015	Yoo Hee-kwan	Doosan Bears	189 2/3	18-5	0	3.94	126	
2016	Chang Won-jun	Doosan Bears	168	15-6	0	3.32	137	
2017	Yang Hyeon-jong	Kia Tigers	193 1/3	20-6	0	3.44	158	
2018	Josh Lindblom	Doosan Bears	168 2/3	15-4	0	2.88	157	
2019	Josh Lindblom	Doosan Bears	194 2/3	20-3	0	2.50	189	
2020	Raúl Alcántara	Doosan Bears	198 2/3	20-2	0	2.54	182	
2021	Ariel Miranda	Doosan Bears	173 2/3	14-5	0	2.33	225	
2022	Kim Kwang-hyun	SSG Landers	173 1/3	13-3	0	2.13	153	
2023	Erick Fedde	NC Dinos	180 1/3	20-6	0	2.00	209	
2024	Kyle Hart	NC Dinos	157	13-3	0	2.69	182	
2025	Cody Ponce	Hanwha Eagles	180 2/3	17-1	0	1.89	252	
2026	Gwak Been	Doosan Bears	161	11-7	0	2.24	197	

== See also ==
- Choi Dong-won
- Cy Young Award
- Eiji Sawamura Award
- Baseball awards § South Korea
