= Yang Suk-hwan =

South Korean baseball player (born 1991)

Doosan Bears – No. 53
- First baseman
- Born: 15 July 1991 (age 35); Seoul, South Korea
- Bats: Left Throws: Right

KBO debut
- March 28, 2015, for the LG Twins

KBO statistics (through 2025)
- Batting average: .261
- Home runs: 164
- Runs batted in: 637
- Stats at Baseball Reference

Teams
- LG Twins (2015–2018, 2020); Doosan Bears (2021–present)

Yang Suk-hwan (Korean: 양석환; born 15 July 1991) is a South Korean professional baseball infielder for the Doosan Bears of the KBO League. He became the captain of the Doosan Bears starting in 2024.
