= Jung Soo-bin =

South Korean baseball player (born 1990)

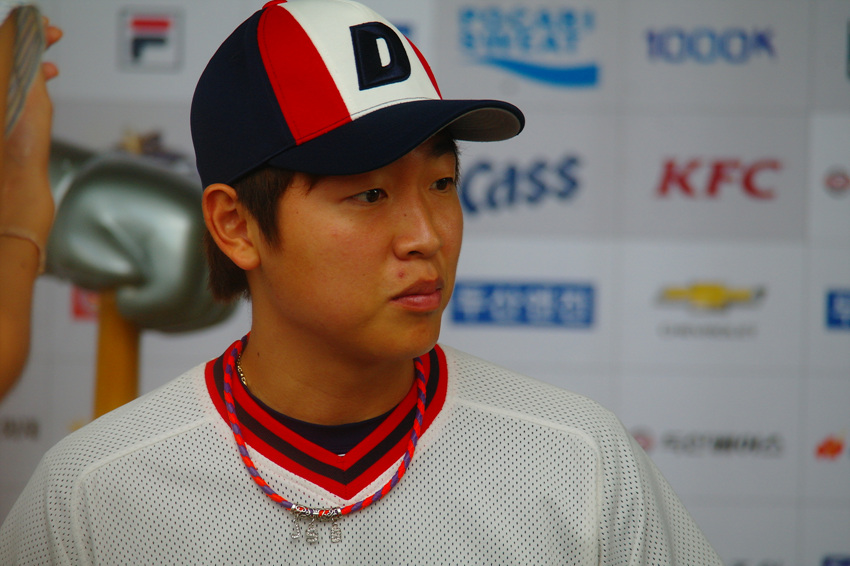

Doosan Bears – No. 31
- Center fielder
- Born: October 7, 1990 (age 36); Suwon, South Korea
- Bats: Left Throws: Left

KBO debut
- April 5, 2009, for the Doosan Bears

KBO statistics (through 2026 season)
- Batting average: .276
- Home runs: 49
- Runs batted in: 634
- Stolen bases: 373
- Stats at Baseball Reference

Teams
- Doosan Bears (2009–2016); Police Baseball Team (2017–2018) (army); Doosan Bears (2018–present)

Career highlights and awards
- 3× Korean Series champion (2015, 2016, 2019); Korean Series MVP (2015); Doosan Bears' all-time hits leader
Medals
Men's baseball
Representing South Korea
World Junior Baseball Championship
Gold medal – first place	2008 Edmonton	Team

Jung Soo-bin (Korean: 정수빈; born October 7, 1990) is a South Korean outfielder for the Doosan Bears of the KBO League. He bats and throws left-handed.

== Amateur career ==
While attending Yu-shin High School in Suwon, Gyeonggi Province, Jung was a highly regarded hitting pitcher, occupying the No. 1 spot in the starting rotation and the leadoff spot in the batting order upon entering the school.

In 2007, his sophomore year of high school, he help his team advance into the semifinals at the 59th Hwarang Flag National High School Baseball Championship, racking up two wins as a starting pitcher.

In 2008, Jung was selected for the South Korea national junior baseball team to compete at the 2008 World Junior Baseball Championship, where they claimed their fifth tournament title. He was named to the All-Tournament team alongside fellow hitter Oh Ji-hwan, batting .423 (11-for-26) with 2 RBIs and 4 runs in 9 games as the starting center fielder of the team.

=== Notable international careers ===
Year	Venue	Competition	Team	Individual note
2008	Canada	World Junior Baseball Championship	Gold medal	.423 BA (11-for-26), 2 RBI, 4 R, 3 BB, 1 SB; All-Star (OF)

== Professional career ==
Jung Soo-bin was drafted by the Doosan Bears in the fifth round of the second nomination (39th pick, 47th overall) at the 2009 KBO Draft. He became the youngest position player in franchise history to be named to the Bears' opening day 26-man roster since Jung Soo-keun in the 1995 season. He made his pro league debut on April 5, 2009, as a pinch runner against the Kia Tigers. On April 22, Jung hit a game-winning two-run home run, which was his first professional home run, against the SK Wyverns in the top of the 12th inning. He finished his rookie season with a respectable .264 batting average, 3 home runs, 17 RBI and 13 stolen bases in 85 games.

In 2010, Jung played in 76 games as a backup outfielder. He batted .322 in 143 at-bats with 19 RBI, and stole 13 bases. After the 2010 season, Jung was selected for the South Korea national baseball team to compete in the Intercontinental Cup held in Taichung.

Jung has led the KBO in triples four times (2011, 2013, 2015, 2020). He was the Most Valuable Player of the 2015 Korean Series.

Prior to the 2021 season, Jung and the Doosan Bears reached an agreement on a six-year contract at a maximum 5.6 billion KRW, including a 1.6 billion KRW signing bonus and 400 million KRW in options.

=== Notable international careers ===
Year	Venue	Competition	Team	Individual note
2010	Chinese Taipei	Intercontinental Cup	6th	.241 BA (7-for-29), 6 RBI, 5 R, 5 BB, 5 SB; SB title
