= Lee Hyun-seung =

Lee Hyun-seung may refer to:

- Lee Hyun-seung (director) (born 1961)
- Lee Hyun-seung (baseball) (born 1983)
- Lee Hyun-seung (footballer) (born 1988)
