= Raúl Alcántara =

Dominican baseball player (born 1992)

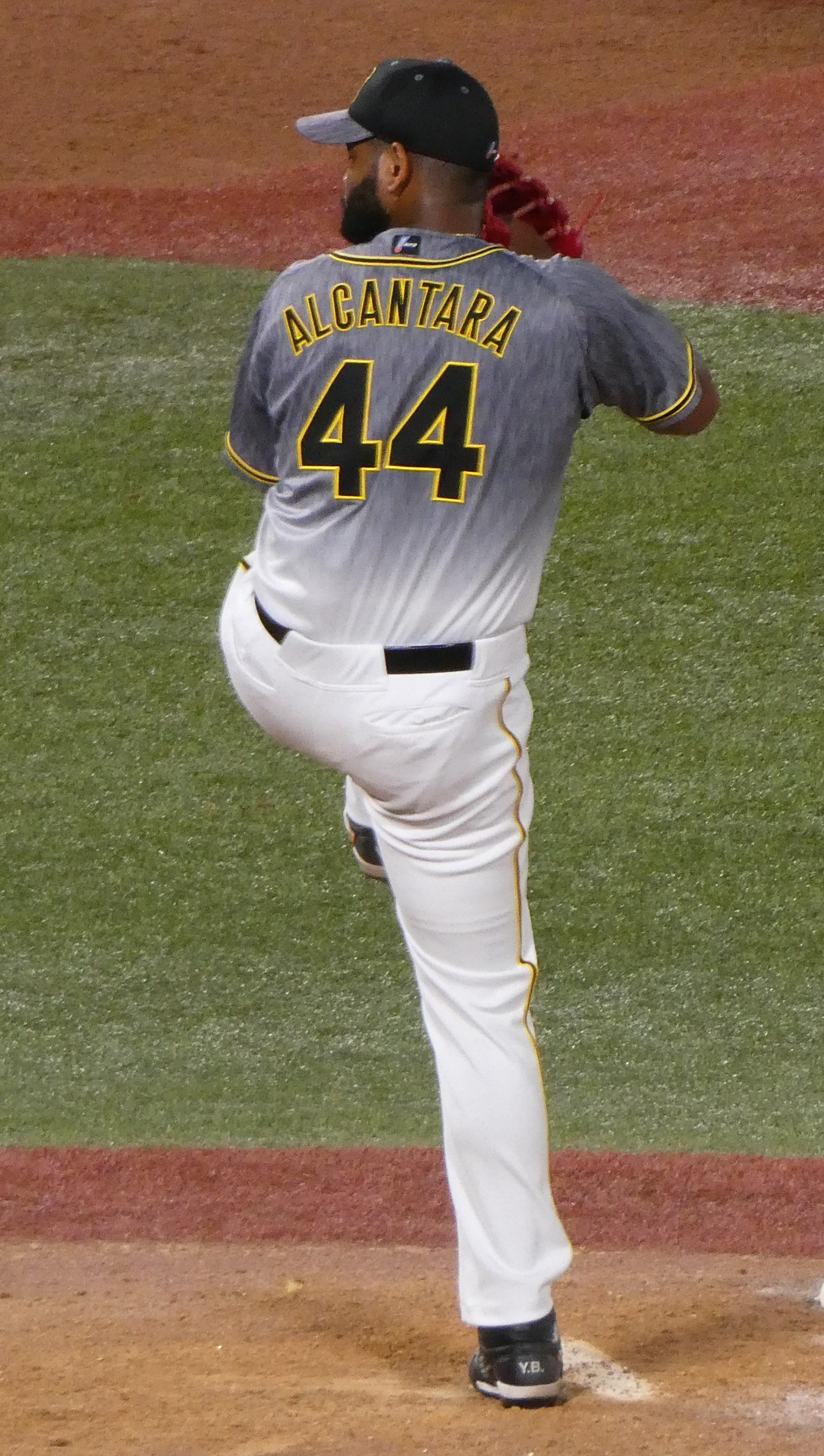
- Alcantara with the Hanshin Tigers

Kiwoom Heroes – No. 54
- Pitcher
- Born: December 4, 1992 (age 33); Barahona, Dominican Republic
- Bats: Right Throws: Right

Professional debut
- MLB: September 5, 2016, for the Oakland Athletics
- KBO: March 30, 2019, for the KT Wiz
- NPB: May 16, 2021, for the Hanshin Tigers

MLB statistics (through 2017 season)
- Win–loss record: 2–5
- Earned run average: 7.19
- Strikeouts: 26

KBO statistics (through August 19, 2026)
- Win–loss record: 62–35
- Earned run average: 3.31
- Strikeouts: 675

NPB statistics (through 2022 season)
- Win–loss record: 4–6
- Earned run average: 3.96
- Strikeouts: 77
- Stats at Baseball Reference

Teams
- Oakland Athletics (2016–2017); KT Wiz (2019); Doosan Bears (2020); Hanshin Tigers (2021–2022); Doosan Bears (2023–2024); Kiwoom Heroes (2025–present)

Career highlights and awards
- KBO: KBO Wins Leader (2020); KBO Golden Gloves Award (2020); Choi Dong-won Award (2020); KBO Highest Win Rate Leader (2020)

Raúl Alcántara (born December 4, 1992) is a Dominican professional baseball pitcher for the Kiwoom Heroes of the KBO League. He has previously played in Major League Baseball (MLB) for the Oakland Athletics, in the KBO League for the KT Wiz and Doosan Bears, and in Nippon Professional Baseball (NPB) for the Hanshin Tigers.

== Career ==
=== Boston Red Sox ===
Alcántara began his career in the Boston Red Sox organization playing for the Rookie Dominican Summer League Red Sox in 2010. He played for both the rookie-level Gulf Coast League Red Sox and Low-A Lowell Spinners in 2011.

=== Oakland Athletics ===
On December 28, 2011, Alcántara was traded with Josh Reddick and Miles Head to the Oakland Athletics in exchange for Andrew Bailey and Ryan Sweeney. He played the entirety of the 2012 season with the Single-A Burlington Bees. Alcántara returned to Single-A in 2013 with the Beloit Snappers, but was promoted to the High-A Stockton Ports at mid-season. He was added to the Athletics' 40-man roster on November 20, 2013, in order to be protected from the Rule 5 draft.

Alcántara began the 2014 season with the Double-A Midland RockHounds, but made only three starts before requiring season-ending Tommy John surgery. He returned to play in 2015, making 15 starts at High-A Stockton. He played that off season with the Estrellas Orientales of the Dominican Winter League. He began the 2016 season at Double-A, but was promoted to the Triple-A Nashville Sounds on July 20. Alcántara was called up to the Athletics to make his major league debut on September 5 against the Los Angeles Angels of Anaheim.

Alcántara started the 2017 season in Oakland, but was designated for assignment on April 25 after accumulating a 16.71 ERA in three appearances. His contract was selected from Nashville, and he was added to Oakland's active roster on September 5. He was cleared waivers and was sent outright to Nashville before the 2018 season. Alcantara elected free agency on October 5, 2018.

=== KT Wiz ===
On November 18, 2018, Alcántara signed with the KT Wiz of the KBO League. He made 27 starts for the Wiz in 2019, compiling an 11–11 record and 4.01 ERA with 100 strikeouts across 172 2/3 innings pitched. Alcántara became a free agent following the season.

=== Doosan Bears ===
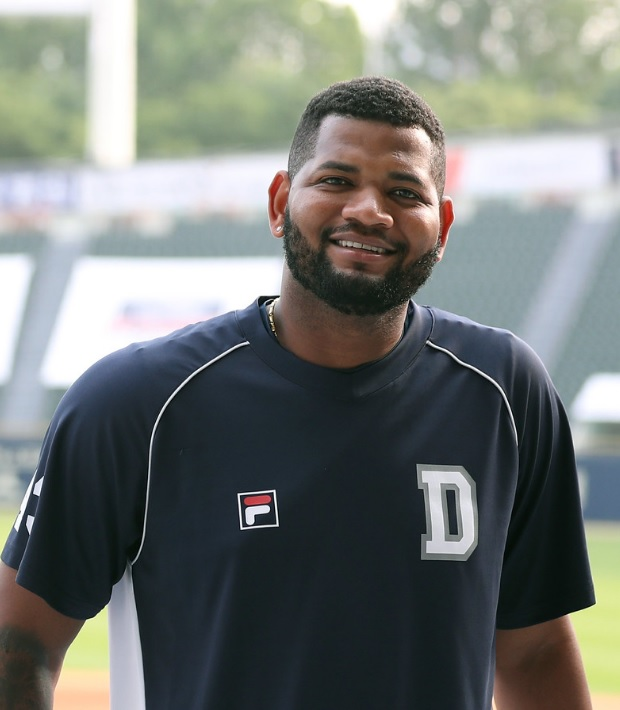
Alcantara with the Doosan Bears

On December 23, 2019, Alcántara signed a one-year, $700,000 contract with the Doosan Bears of the KBO League. After the season, Alcántara was named the Choi Dong-won Award Winner, the equivalent to the Cy Young award in the KBO, after pitching to a 2.54 ERA with 8.2 K/9 and 1.4 BB/9 over 198.2 innings pitched. He became a free agent following the season.

=== Hanshin Tigers ===
On December 23, 2020, Alcántara signed with the Hanshin Tigers of Nippon Professional Baseball. On May 16, 2021, Alcántara made his NPB debut.

=== Doosan Bears (second stint) ===
On December 11, 2022, Alcantara signed with the Doosan Bears. In 2023, he made 31 starts for Doosan, logging a 13–9 record and 2.67 ERA with 162 strikeouts across 192 innings of work.

On December 21, 2023, Alcántara re–signed with the Bears on a one–year, $1.3 million contract. In 12 starts, he compiled a 2–2 record and 4.76 ERA with 34 strikeouts across 64 1/3 innings pitched. Alcántara was released by Doosan on July 4, 2024.

=== Leones de Yucatán ===
On April 3, 2025, Alcántara signed with the Leones de Yucatán of the Mexican League. In five starts for Yucatán, he struggled to an 0–1 record and 7.17 ERA with 13 strikeouts across 21 1/3 innings pitched. Alcántara was released by the Leones on May 15.

=== Kiwoom Heroes ===
On May 19, 2025, Alcántara signed with the Kiwoom Heroes of the KBO League. In 19 starts for the Heroes, he compiled an 8–4 record and 3.27 ERA with 92 strikeouts over 121 innings of work.

On December 16, 2025, Alcántara re-signed with Kiwoom on a one-year, $900,000 contract.

On November 19, 2026, Alcantara re-signed with Kiwoom on a one-year contract for the 2027 season.
