= 2015 KBO League season =

2015 Tire Bank KBO League
- League: KBO League
- Sport: Baseball
- Duration: 28 March – 6 October
- Number of games: 144 per team
- Number of teams: 10

Regular Season
- Season champions: Samsung Lions
- Season MVP: Eric Thames (NC)

Postseason
- Wild Card champions: Nexen Heroes
- Wild Card runners-up: SK Wyverns
- Semi-playoffs champions: Doosan Bears
- Semi-playoffs runners-up: Nexen Heroes
- Playoffs champions: Doosan Bears
- Playoffs runners-up: NC Dinos

Korean Series
- Champions: Doosan Bears
- Runners-up: Samsung Lions
- Finals MVP: Jung Soo-bin (Doosan)

KBO seasons
- ← 2014 2016 →

The 2015 KBO League season was the 34th season in the history of the Korea Professional Baseball league.

== Season structure ==
=== Regular season ===
Due to the addition of the KT Wiz into the KBO, the 2015 KBO league schedule was increased to each team playing 144 games during the regular season (each team had played 128 games during the 2014 regular season), with each team playing each other 16 times.

=== All-Star Game ===
In July, the best players participated in the 2015 KBO All-Star Game. The participating franchises were divided into two regions, the Dream All-Stars (Samsung Lions, Doosan Bears, Lotte Giants, SK Wyverns, KT Wiz) and Nanum All-Stars (Kia Tigers, Hanwha Eagles, LG Twins, Nexen Heroes, NC Dinos). The Korean All-Star Game did not determine home-field advantage in the Korean Series. The All-Star Game was played on 18 July 2015 at the Suwon Baseball Stadium and won by the Dream All-Stars 6–3.

=== Postseason ===
2015 KBO League season culminated in its championship series, known as the Korean Series. The Semi-Playoff format was tweaked. Previously, the top four teams after the end of the regular season qualified for the postseason, but in 2015, the top five teams qualified for the postseason. The team with the best record gained a direct entry into the Korean Series, while the other four teams competed for the remaining place in a step-ladder playoff system. Starting in 2015, the fourth-place and the fifth-place teams played in a "Wildcard" game.

- Wildcard (best-of-two)
  - Regular-season 4th place vs. regular-season 5th place
- Semi-playoff (best-of-five, added from 3 games starting from 2008)
  - Regular-season 3rd place vs. Wild Card winner
- Playoff (best-of-five, reduced from 7 games starting from 2009)
  - Regular-season 2nd place vs. semi-playoff winner
- Korean Series (best-of-seven)
  - Regular-season 1st place vs. playoff winner

=== To determine the final standings ===
- Champion (1st place): Korean Series winner
- Runner-up (2nd place): Korean Series loser
- 3rd–10th place: sort by regular-season record except teams playing in the Korean Series.

== Standings ==
Rank	Team	GP	W	L	D	Pct.	KBO postseason
1	Samsung Lions	144	88	56	0	0.611	KBO Korean Series
2	NC Dinos	144	84	57	3	0.596	Playoff
3	Doosan Bears	144	79	65	0	0.549	Semi-playoff
4	Nexen Heroes	144	78	65	1	0.545	Wildcard 1
5	SK Wyverns	144	69	73	2	0.486	Wildcard 2
6	Hanwha Eagles	144	68	76	0	0.472	Did not qualify
7	Kia Tigers	144	67	77	0	0.465	Did not qualify
8	Lotte Giants	144	66	77	1	0.462	Did not qualify
9	LG Twins	144	64	78	2	0.451	Did not qualify
10	KT Wiz	144	52	91	1	0.364	Did not qualify

== Foreign hitters ==
Each team could have signed up to three foreign players. Due to the high proportion of pitchers signed in previous years, beginning in 2014 the league mandated that at least one of the foreign players must be a position player.

Team	Player	Position	In KBO since	Batting Average	Home runs	RBI	Notes
Doosan Bears	Zach Lutz	3B	2015	.111	1	3	Released by the team
Doosan Bears	Deibinson Romero	3B	2015	.253	12	50	Replaced Zach Lutz on the roster
Hanwha Eagles	Nyjer Morgan	OF	2015	.273	0	5	
Hanwha Eagles	Jake Fox	C/OF	2015	.278	7	25	
Kia Tigers	Brett Pill	1B	2014	.325	22	101	
LG Twins	Jack Hannahan	1B	2015	.327	4	22	Released by the team due to injury
LG Twins	Luis Jiménez	1B	2015	.312	11	46	Signed to replace Jack Hannahan on the roster
Lotte Giants	Jim Adduci	1B	2014	.314	28	106	
NC Dinos	Eric Thames	1B	2014	.381	47	140	KBO Most Valuable Player, KBO All-Star, KBO batting champion, KBO OBP leader, KBO SLG leader, KBO Runs leader, Golden Glove Award
Nexen Heroes	Brad Snyder	OF	2015	.281	26	71	
Samsung Lions	Yamaico Navarro	2B	2014	.287	48	137	KBO All-Star, Golden Glove Award
SK Wyverns	Andrew Brown	OF	2015	.261	28	76	

== Postseason ==
Wild Card
4	Nexen Heroes	2
5	SK Wyverns	0

Semi-playoff
3	Doosan Bears	3
4	Nexen Heroes	1

Playoff
2	NC Dinos	2
3	Doosan Bears	3

Korean Series
1	Samsung Lions	1
3	Doosan Bears	4

=== Wild Card ===
The series started with a 1–0 advantage for the fourth-placed team.

Nexen won the series, 2–0.

Game	Date	Score	Location	Time	Attendance
1	7 October	SK Wyverns 4 – 5 Nexen Heroes	Mokdong Baseball Stadium, Seoul	18:30	7,469

=== Semi-playoff ===
Doosan won the series, 3–1.

Game	Date	Score	Location	Time	Attendance
1	10 October	Nexen Heroes 3 – 4 Doosan Bears	Jamsil Baseball Stadium, Seoul	14:00	20,833
2	11 October	Nexen Heroes 2 – 3 Doosan Bears	Jamsil Baseball Stadium, Seoul	14:00	22,765
3	13 October	Doosan Bears 2 – 5 Nexen Heroes	Mokdong Baseball Stadium, Seoul	18:30	9,900
4	14 October	Doosan Bears 11 – 9 Nexen Heroes	Mokdong Baseball Stadium, Seoul	18:30	8,227

=== Playoff ===
Doosan won the series, 3–2.

Game	Date	Score	Location	Time	Attendance
1	18 October	Doosan Bears 7 – 0 NC Dinos	Masan Baseball Stadium, Changwon	14:00	11,000
2	19 October	Doosan Bears 1 – 2 NC Dinos	Masan Baseball Stadium, Changwon	18:30	11,000
3	21 October	NC Dinos 16 – 2 Doosan Bears	Jamsil Baseball Stadium, Seoul	18:30	24,119
4	22 October	NC Dinos 0 – 7 Doosan Bears	Jamsil Baseball Stadium, Seoul	18:30	22,652
5	24 October	Doosan Bears 6 – 4 NC Dinos	Masan Baseball Stadium, Changwon	14:00	11,000

=== Korean Series ===
Doosan Bears won the series, 4–1.

Game	Date	Score	Location	Time	Attendance
1	26 October	Doosan Bears 8 – 9 Samsung Lions	Daegu Baseball Stadium, Daegu	3:46	10,000
2	27 October	Doosan Bears 6 – 1 Samsung Lions	Daegu Baseball Stadium, Daegu	3:06	10,000
3	29 October	Samsung Lions 1 – 5 Doosan Bears	Jamsil Baseball Stadium, Seoul	3:22	25,000
4	30 October	Samsung Lions 3 – 4 Doosan Bears	Jamsil Baseball Stadium, Seoul	3:21	25,000
5	31 October	Samsung Lions 2 – 13 Doosan Bears	Jamsil Baseball Stadium, Seoul	3:32	25,000

2015 Korean Series Champion

Doosan Bears
(Fourth title)
