= Park Yu-yeon =

South Korean baseball player

- Catcher
- Born: 20 December 1998 (age 26); Gwangju, South Korea
- Batted: Right Threw: Right

KBO debut
- July 1, 2017, for the Doosan Bears

Last KBO appearance
- August 24, 2023, for the Doosan Bears

KBO statistics
- Batting average: .250
- Home runs: 0
- Runs batted in: 3

Teams
- Doosan Bears (2017–2023)

Park Yu-yeon (Korean: 박유연; born 20 December 1998) is a South Korean professional baseball catcher who played for the Doosan Bears of the KBO League. He graduated from Dongsan High School and was selected for the Doosan Bears by a draft in 2017 (2nd draft, 6th round). He made his first hit in his debut game on 1 July 2017.
