= Yoo Hee-kwan =

South Korean baseball player (born 1986)

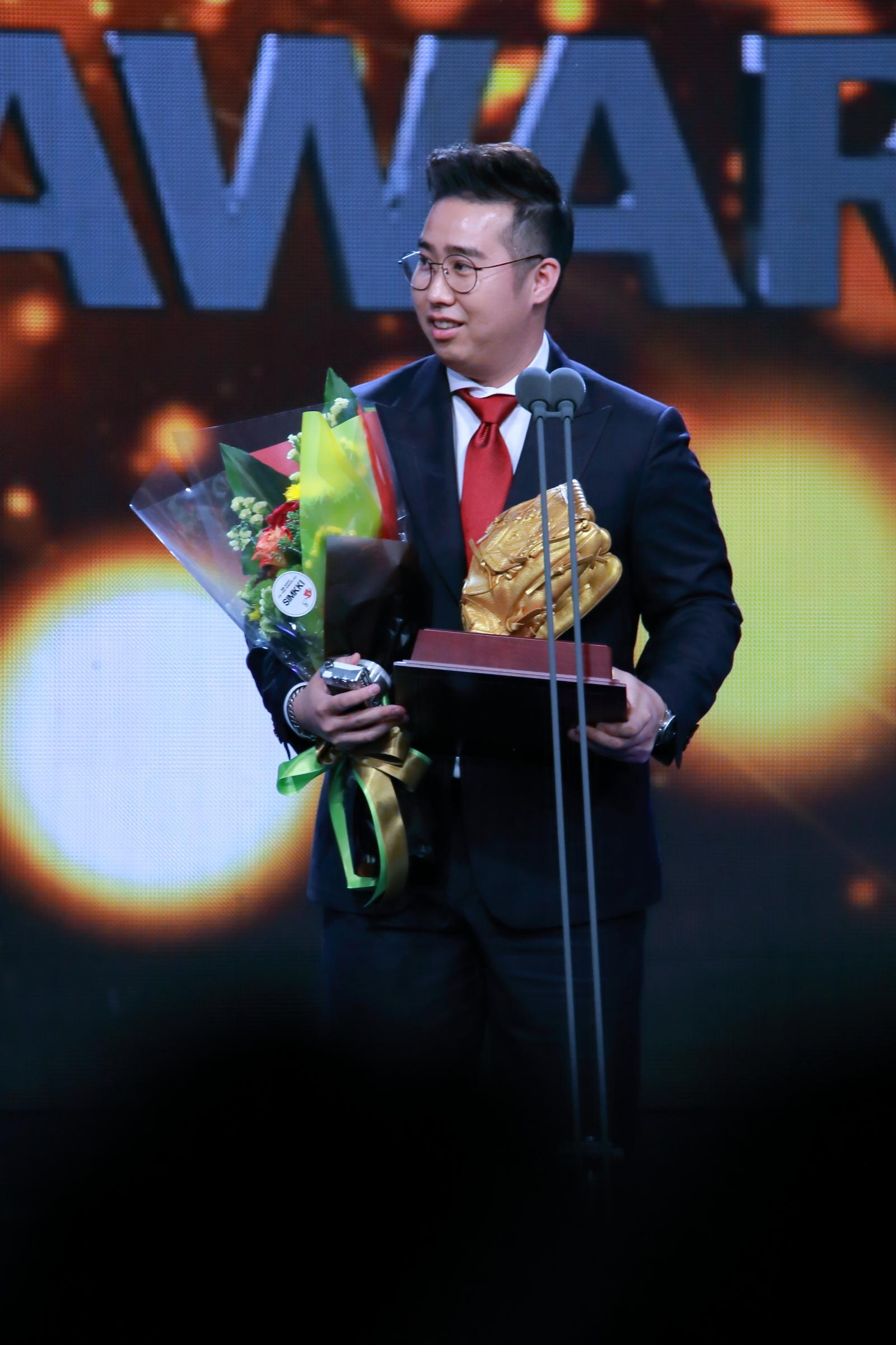
- Starting pitcher
- Born: June 1, 1986 (age 40)
- Batted: Left Threw: Left

KBO debut
- May 3, 2009, for the Doosan Bears

Last KBO appearance
- October 10, 2021, for the Doosan Bears

KBO statistics
- Win–loss record: 101–69
- Earned run average: 4.58
- Strikeouts: 777
- Stats at Baseball Reference

Teams
- Doosan Bears (2009–2021); Sangmu Baseball Team (2011–2012)

Career highlights and awards
- Korean Series (2015, 2016, 2019); Choi Dong-won Award (2015)

Yoo Hee-kwan (Korean: 유희관; Hanja: 柳熙寬; born June 1, 1986, in Seoul) is a South Korean former starting pitcher for the Doosan Bears of the KBO League. He bats and throws left-handed.

== Professional career ==
Yoo started his career with the Doosan Bears in 2009 and 2010, and played sporadically out of the bullpen. He then served in military duty for 2 years and played in the military's team, the Sangmu Baseball Team. Upon returning to Doosan in 2013, he emerged as a surprisingly dominant starting pitcher, earning 10 wins and a 3.53 ERA. He consolidated his position in 2014 and 2015, winning 12 and 18 games respectively. In 2015, his 18 wins were good for second in the league, behind the NC Dinos' Eric Hacker. He was instrumental in Doosan's 2015 season Korean Series title, earning the win and game MVP honors in the decisive Game 5 against the Samsung Lions.

== Pitching style ==
Yoo is known for his unconventional pitching style. Yoo has a fairly short stature for a pitcher, standing at 1.80 m, and is bulky, weighing 88 kg. Yoo is amongst the slowest hurlers in the league, as his fastball rarely tops 133 km/h (83 mph). Yoo, a left-handed pitcher, makes up for this slow delivery with excellent control, and a very efficient set of change-ups and breaking balls.

== Personal life ==
Yoo graduated from Chung-Ang University, where he played college baseball. In college, he was an avid basketball player as well and became close friends with future KBL MVP Award winners Oh Se-keun and Kim Sun-hyung as members of the basketball and baseball teams shared the same dormitory.

== Filmography ==
=== Television series ===
Year	Title	Role	Notes	Ref.
2024	Flex X Cop	himself	Cameo (episode 1)	

=== Television show ===
Year	Title	Role	Notes	Ref.
2022	Strongest Baseball	Cast Member		
2022	Sports Golden Bell	Contestant	Chuseok Special	

=== Web shows ===
Year	Title	Role	Ref.
2023-2024	Zombieverse	Cast Member	
