= Kyle Hart =

American baseball player (born 1992)

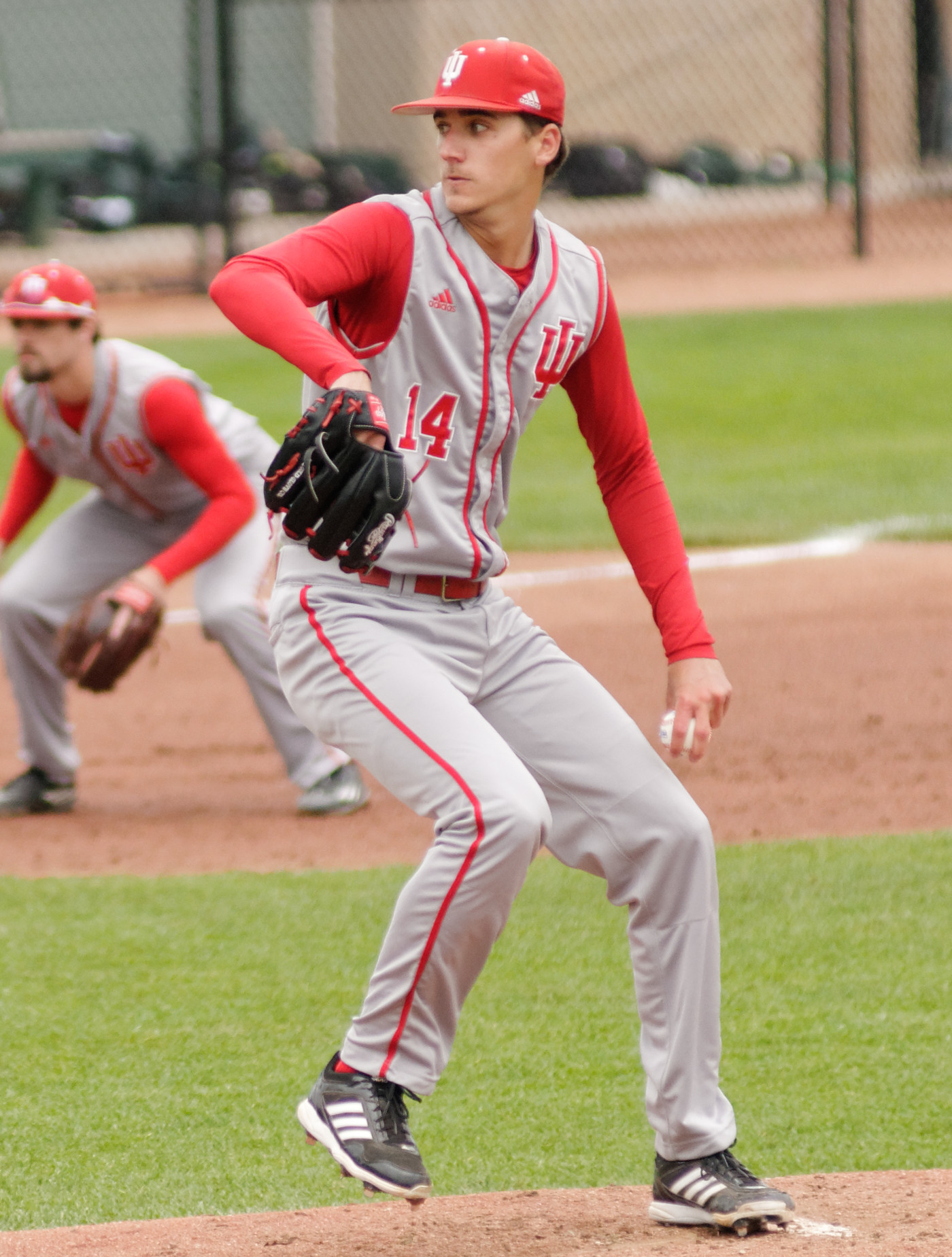
- Hart at Indiana in 2016

San Diego Padres – No. 68
- Pitcher
- Born: November 23, 1992 (age 33); Cincinnati, Ohio, U.S.
- Bats: Left Throws: Left

Professional debut
- MLB: August 13, 2020, for the Boston Red Sox
- KBO: March 23, 2024, for the NC Dinos

MLB statistics (through 2026 season)
- Win–loss record: 4–7
- Earned run average: 6.25
- Strikeouts: 109

KBO statistics (through 2024 season)
- Win–loss record: 13–3
- Earned run average: 2.69
- Strikeouts: 182
- Stats at Baseball Reference

Teams
- Boston Red Sox (2020); NC Dinos (2024); San Diego Padres (2025–present)

Career highlights and awards
- KBO: Choi Dong-won Award (2024)

Kyle Patrick Hart (born November 23, 1992) is an American professional baseball pitcher for the San Diego Padres of Major League Baseball (MLB). He has previously played in MLB for the Boston Red Sox, and in the KBO League for the NC Dinos. Listed at 6 feet 5 inches (1.96 m) and 200 pounds (91 kg), he both throws and bats left-handed.

== Amateur career ==
Hart graduated from Sycamore High School in Cincinnati, Ohio. He attended Indiana University, where he played college baseball for the Indiana Hoosiers for five seasons (2012–2016), having undergone Tommy John surgery during his junior year.

== Professional career ==
=== Boston Red Sox ===
The Boston Red Sox selected Hart in the 19th round, with the 568th overall selection, of the 2016 Major League Baseball draft. In 2017, Hart appeared in games with the Gulf Coast League Red Sox, Greenville Drive, and Salem Red Sox compiling a 6–5 record in 22 games (19 starts) with a 2.15 earned run average (ERA) while striking out 109 batters in 117 innings pitched. In 2018, Hart spent all of the season with the Double-A Portland Sea Dogs, recording a 3.57 ERA while striking out 100 batters in 138 2/3 innings with a 7–9 record in 24 games (all starts).

In 2019, Hart started the season with Portland, then was promoted to the Triple-A Pawtucket Red Sox in late May; overall for the season, he had a 12–13 record in 77 games (71 starts) with a 3.52 ERA while striking out 140 batters in 156 innings pitched. After the 2019 season, the Red Sox added Hart to their 40-man roster.

In 2020, Hart was optioned to Triple-A Pawtucket on March 8. After the delayed start of the MLB season, the Red Sox named Hart as the starting pitcher for their August 13 game against the Tampa Bay Rays. Making his MLB debut, Hart allowed seven runs (five earned) on seven hits and three walks in two innings of work, taking the loss. With the seats empty due to the COVID-19 pandemic, Hart later said it felt like a scrimmage. Hart was placed on the injured list on September 2, with a left hip impingement, and moved to the 45-day injured list on September 15. With the 2020 Red Sox, Hart made four appearances (three starts), registering an 0–1 record with 15.55 ERA in 11 innings pitched with 13 strikeouts. On November 20, 2020, Hart was outrighted off of the 40-man roster and assigned to Triple-A. Hart spent the 2021 season in Triple-A with the Worcester Red Sox; in 23 games (20 starts), he compiled a 4.22 ERA with 6–9 record while striking out 90 batters in 106 2/3 innings.

Hart began the 2022 season with Worcester, then was assigned to Portland on May 16. He made 24 appearances split between Worcester and Portland in 2022, accumulating a 7–3 record and 5.25 ERA with 74 strikeouts in 82.1 innings pitched. Hart elected free agency following the season on November 10.

=== Philadelphia Phillies ===
On February 7, 2023, Hart signed a minor league contract with the Philadelphia Phillies organization. Hart made one appearance for the Triple-A Lehigh Valley IronPigs, striking out one in a scoreless inning of work. He was released by the Phillies on April 19.

=== Seattle Mariners ===
On June 3, 2023, Hart signed a minor league contract with the Seattle Mariners organization. In 18 starts for the Triple–A Tacoma Rainiers, he registered a 4–6 record and 4.58 ERA with 85 strikeouts across 88 1/3 innings pitched. Hart elected free agency following the season on November 6.

=== NC Dinos ===
On December 19, 2023, Hart signed a one–year, $500K contract with the NC Dinos of the KBO League. The deal included a $200K signing bonus and another possible $200K through incentives. In 26 starts for the team in 2024, he posted a 13–3 record and a 2.69 ERA. Following the season, he won the Choi Dong-won Award, the KBO equivalent to the Cy Young Award. He later became a free agent in order to pursue a return to MLB.

=== San Diego Padres ===
On February 13, 2025, Hart signed a one-year, major league contract with the San Diego Padres that included a club option for the 2026 season. He made 20 appearances (six starts) for San Diego, compiling a 3-3 record and 5.86 ERA with 37 strikeouts over 43 innings of work. The Padres declined Hart's 2026 option on November 4, making him a free agent.

On November 17, 2025, the Padres re-signed Hart to a one-year, $1 million contract that includes a club option for 2027.

== Personal life ==
Married to his wife, Haley Hart in November 2022 in Granby, Colorado. The two have two dogs, David Bowie and Sadie Jane. Along with their daughter, Eden born July 31, 2023.
