= Song Il-soo =

Japanese baseball player and manager (born 1950)

Kazuhide Ishiyama
- Catcher / Manager
- Born: December 23, 1950 (age 75); Shimogyō-ku, Kyoto, Kyoto Prefecture
- Batted: Right Threw: Right

Professional debut
- NPB: September 21, 1974, for the Kintetsu Buffaloes
- KBO: 1984, for the Samsung Lions

Last appearance
- NPB: October 21, 1983, for the Kintetsu Buffaloes
- KBO: 1986, for the Samsung Lions
- Stats at Baseball Reference

Teams
- As player: Kintetsu Buffaloes (1970–1983); Samsung Lions (1984–1986); As coach: Osaka Kintetsu Buffaloes (1993–2004); Doosan Bears (2013); As manager: Doosan Bears (2014)

Song Il-soo

Japanese name
- Kanji: 石山一秀
- Kana: いしやま かずひで
Transcriptions
- Romanization: Ishiyama Kazuhide

Korean name
- Hangul: 송일수
- Hanja: 宋一秀
Transcriptions
- Revised Romanization: Song Ilsu
- McCune–Reischauer: Song Ilsu

Kazuhide Ishiyama or Song Il-soo (石山 一秀、いしやま かずひで、born December 23, 1950) is the former manager of the Doosan Bears of the KBO League.
