= Ariel Miranda =

Cuban baseball player (born 1989)

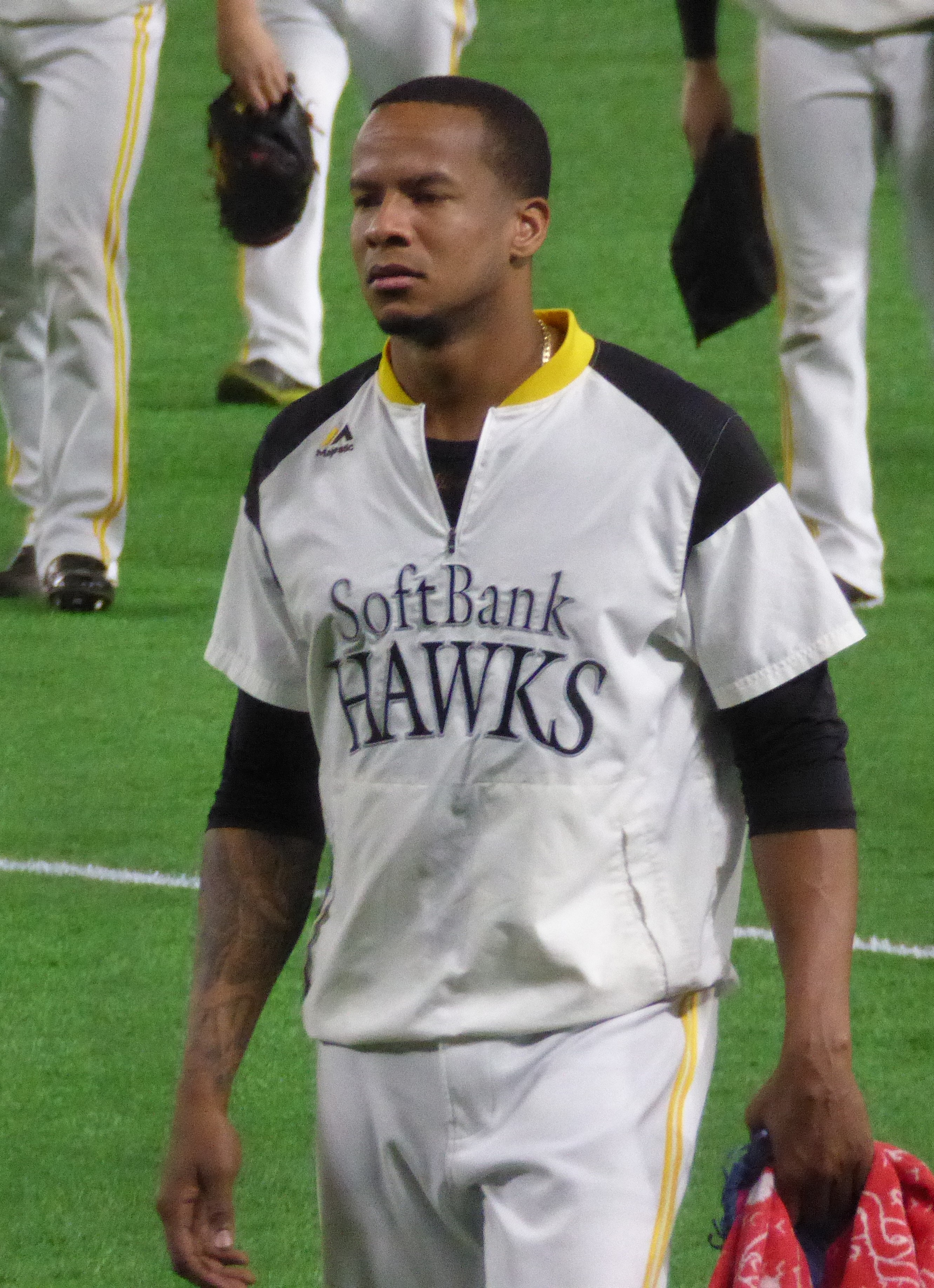
- Miranda with the Fukuoka SoftBank Hawks in 2019

Free agent
- Pitcher
- Born: January 10, 1989 (age 37); Havana, Cuba
- Bats: Left Throws: Left

Professional debut
- MLB: July 3, 2016, for the Baltimore Orioles
- NPB: August 8, 2018, for the Fukuoka SoftBank Hawks
- CPBL: April 12, 2020, for the Chinatrust Brothers
- KBO: April 7, 2021, for the Doosan Bears

MLB statistics (through 2018 season)
- Win–loss record: 13–9
- Earned run average: 4.72
- Strikeouts: 186

NPB statistics (through 2019 season)
- Win–loss record: 13–6
- Earned run average: 3.37
- Strikeouts: 98

CPBL statistics (through 2020 season)
- Win–loss record: 10–8
- Earned run average: 3.80
- Strikeouts: 170

KBO statistics (through 2022 season)
- Win–loss record: 14–5
- Earned run average: 2.58
- Strikeouts: 233
- Stats at Baseball Reference

Teams
- Baltimore Orioles (2016); Seattle Mariners (2016–2018); Fukuoka SoftBank Hawks (2018–2019); Chinatrust Brothers (2020); Doosan Bears (2021–2022)

Career highlights and awards
- NPB: 2× Japan Series Champion (2018, 2019); KBO: KBO League MVP (2021); Choi Dong-won Award (2021); KBO ERA leader (2021); KBO strikeout leader (2021); KBO Golden Glove Award (2021)

Ariel Miranda Gil (born January 10, 1989) is a Cuban professional baseball pitcher who is currently a free agent. He has previously played in Major League Baseball (MLB) for the Baltimore Orioles and Seattle Mariners, Nippon Professional Baseball (NPB) for the Fukuoka SoftBank Hawks, the Chinese Professional Baseball League (CPBL) for the Chinatrust Brothers, and the KBO League for the Doosan Bears.

== Career ==
Miranda played in the Cuban National Series from 2007 to 2013. He defected from Cuba to pursue a career in Major League Baseball (MLB).

=== Baltimore Orioles ===
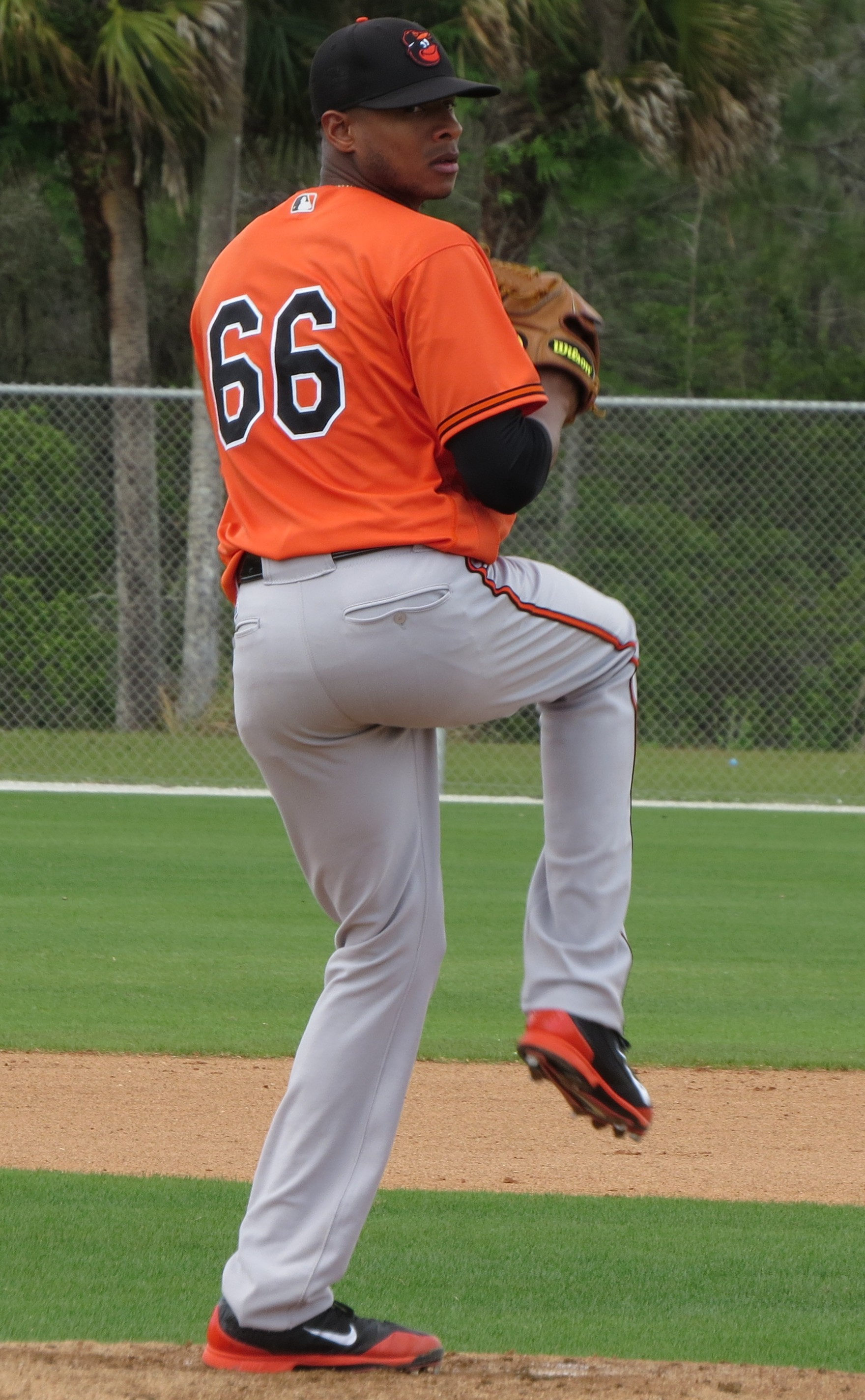
Miranda pitching for the Baltimore Orioles in 2016 spring training

On May 23, 2015, Miranda signed a minor league contract with the Baltimore Orioles organization. He split the season between the rookie-level Gulf Coast League Orioles, High-A Frederick Keys, and Double-A Bowie Baysox, accumulating a combined 6-3 record and 3.60 ERA with 71 strikeouts in 70 pitched across 14 total appearances.

Miranda began the 2016 season with the Triple-A Norfolk Tides. On July 3, 2016, the Orioles selected Miranda's contract, adding him to their active roster. He made his major league debut that day against the Seattle Mariners, pitching two innings of relief and giving up three runs off four hits with four strikeouts.

=== Seattle Mariners ===
On July 31, 2016, the Orioles traded Miranda to the Seattle Mariners in exchange for Wade Miley. He made 11 appearances (10 starts) for the team, compiling a 5-2 record and 3.54 ERA with 40 strikeouts over 56 innings of work.

The 2017 Mariners roster was crippled by player injuries, specifically to the starting rotation, and Miranda was one of the only starters to consistently stay in the rotation without injuring himself or being sent down. On June 4, Miranda pitched his first complete game, a 7-1 win against the Tampa Bay Rays. For the season, he finished with a record of 8-7 and a 5.12 ERA in 31 games (29 starts) for the Mariners. He allowed 37 home runs in 160 innings pitched while striking out 137.

Miranda made one appearance for Seattle in 2018, allowing one earned run on six hits with five strikeouts and four walks across five innings pitched against the Houston Astros. Miranda was released by the Mariners on July 4, 2018.

=== Fukuoka SoftBank Hawks ===
On July 17, 2018, he signed with the Fukuoka SoftBank Hawks of Nippon Professional Baseball. On August 18, he pitched against the Orix Buffaloes as a starting pitcher, and won the game for the first time in the Pacific League. In the 2018 season, he finished the regular season with 5 games pitched, a 6–1 win–loss record, a 1.89 ERA, and 40 strikeouts in 47 2/3 innings. On October 30, he pitched against the Hiroshima Toyo Carp as a starting pitcher, and won the game in the 2018 Japan Series.

In the 2019 season, Miranda finished the regular season with 18 games pitched, a 7–5 win–loss record, a 4.19 ERA, one save, and 58 strikeouts in 86 innings. And he was selected to the Japan Series roster in the 2019 Japan Series. On November 28, Fukuoka SoftBank Hawks announced that team will not sign with Miranda for next season. On December 2, 2019, he became a free agent.

=== Chinatrust Brothers ===
On January 7, 2020, Miranda signed with the Chinatrust Brothers of the Chinese Professional Baseball League. Miranda made 25 starts for the Brothers, compiling a 10-8 record and 3.80 ERA with 170 strikeouts across 156 1/3 innings pitched.

=== Doosan Bears ===
On December 23, 2020, Miranda signed a one-year deal with the Doosan Bears that will be worth up to $800,000. On October 24, 2021, Miranda struck out Hong Chang-ki of the LG Twins to record his 224th strikeout of the season. This surpassed the 37-year-old KBO strikeout record previously held by Choi Dong-won. Miranda finished the season with 225 total strikeouts, and won the Choi Dong-won Award as the league's best pitcher for the 2021 KBO League season. Miranda led the KBO with a 2.33 ERA and 225 strikeouts, both setting new single-season records. He won the KBO League Most Valuable Player Award and the Choi Dong-won Award, presented annually to the top pitcher in South Korea, earlier this month.

On December 24, 2021, Miranda re-signed with the Bears on a one-year, $1.9 million contract. He made three starts for the team in 2022, recording an 8.22 ERA with eight strikeouts across 7 2/3 innings pitched. Miranda was released by the team on July 13, 2022 after suffering a shoulder injury.

=== Saraperos de Saltillo ===
On March 13, 2023, Miranda signed with the Saraperos de Saltillo of the Mexican League. In 16 starts for Saltillo, Miranda posted a 4.56 ERA with 94 strikeouts across 77 innings pitched.

=== Piratas de Campeche ===
On December 7, 2023, Miranda signed with the Piratas de Campeche of the Mexican League. In 15 starts for the Piratas, he logged a 3–5 record and 3.72 ERA with 80 strikeouts across 72 2/3 innings pitched.

=== Conspiradores de Querétaro ===
On December 11, 2024, Miranda was traded to the Olmecas de Tabasco in exchange for T. J. Zeuch. He was released prior to the start of the season on April 16, 2025.

On April 30, 2025, Miranda signed with the Conspiradores de Querétaro of the Mexican League. In 14 starts for Querétaro, Miranda struggled to an 0-5 record and 10.45 ERA with 46 strikeouts across 51 2/3 innings pitched.

=== Charros de Jalisco ===
On July 28, 2025, Miranda was traded to the Charros de Jalisco of the Mexican League. He made two starts for Jalisco, posting a 1-0 record and 7.50 ERA with four strikeouts over six innings of work. He became a free agent following the season.
