= 2016 KBO League season =

2016 Tire Bank KBO League
- League: KBO League
- Sport: Baseball
- Duration: April 1 – October 9
- Games: 144 per team
- Teams: 10
- Total attendance: 8,339,577

Regular Season
- Season champions: Doosan Bears
- Season MVP: Dustin Nippert (Doosan)

Postseason
- Wild Card champions: LG Twins
- Wild Card runners-up: KIA Tigers
- Semi-playoffs champions: LG Twins
- Semi-playoffs runners-up: Nexen Heroes
- Playoffs champions: NC Dinos
- Playoffs runners-up: LG Twins

Korean Series
- Champions: Doosan Bears
- Runners-up: NC Dinos
- Finals MVP: Yang Eui-ji (Doosan)

KBO League seasons
- ← 2015 2017 →

The 2016 KBO League season was the 35th season in the history of the Korea Professional Baseball League.

== Season structure ==
=== Stadium changes for 2016 season ===
- The Nexen Heroes left the 12,500-seat Mokdong Baseball Stadium and began play in the newly built 17,000-seat Gocheok Sky Dome.
- The Samsung Lions left the 10,000-seat Daegu Baseball Stadium and began play in the newly built 24,000-seat Daegu Samsung Lions Park.
- Munhak Baseball Stadium, home of the SK Wyverns, was fitted with a 12,257 square feet scoreboard before the start of the season

=== Regular season ===
Each KBO team played 144 games during the regular season with all teams playing each other 16 times. The 144-game-schedule began in the 2015 season due to the addition of the KT Wiz. During the 2014 season, each team had played 128 games.

=== All-Star Game ===
On July 16, the best players participated in the 2016 KBO All-Star Game at Gocheok Sky Dome in Seoul. The participating franchises were divided into two regions, the Dream All-Stars (Samsung Lions, Doosan Bears, Lotte Giants, SK Wyverns, KT Wiz) and Nanum All-Stars (Kia Tigers, Hanwha Eagles, LG Twins, Nexen Heroes, NC Dinos). The Nanum All-Star team emerged victorious with an 8–4 victory over the Dream All-Star Team in front of a sold-out crowd of 16, 300 fans. Doosan Bears outfielder Min Byung-hun, who hit two home runs during the game, was named the MVP of the game. The KBO All-Star Game however does not determine home-field advantage in the Korean Series.

=== Postseason ===
The 2016 KBO League season culminates in its championship series, known as the Korean Series. Before the 2015 season, the Semi-playoff format was tweaked. Previously, the top four teams after the end of the regular season qualified for the postseason, but in 2015, the top five teams qualified for the postseason. The team with the best record gained a direct entry into the Korean Series, while the other four teams competed for the remaining place in a step-ladder playoff system. Starting in 2015, the fourth-place and the fifth-place teams played in a "Wildcard" game/series.

=== Procedure to Determine Final Standings ===
- Champion (first place): Korean Series Winner
- Runner-up (second place): Korean Series Loser
- Third–Tenth place: Regular Season records determine third to tenth place spots in Final Standings

== Standings ==
Rank	Team	W	L	D	Pct.	GB	Postseason
1	Doosan Bears	93	50	1	0.650	—	Korean Series
2	NC Dinos	83	58	3	0.589	9	Playoff
3	Nexen Heroes	77	66	1	0.538	16	Semi-playoff
4	LG Twins	71	71	2	0.500	21½	Wild Card
5	KIA Tigers	70	73	1	0.490	23	Wild Card
6	SK Wyverns	69	75	0	0.479	24½	Did not qualify
7	Hanwha Eagles	66	75	3	0.468	26	Did not qualify
8	Lotte Giants	66	78	0	0.458	27½	Did not qualify
9	Samsung Lions	65	78	1	0.455	28	Did not qualify
10	KT Wiz	53	89	2	0.373	39½	Did not qualify

== Postseason ==
Wild Card
4	LG Twins	2
5	KIA Tigers	1

Semi-playoff
3	Nexen Heroes	1
4	LG Twins	3

Playoff
2	NC Dinos	3
4	LG Twins	1

Korean Series
1	Doosan Bears	4
2	NC Dinos	0

=== Wild Card ===
The series started with a 1–0 advantage for the fourth-placed team.

LG won the series, 2–1.

Game	Date	Score	Location	Time	Attendance
1	October 10	KIA Tigers 4 – LG Twins 2	Jamsil Baseball Stadium	2:43	25,000
2	October 11	KIA Tigers 0 – LG Twins 1	Jamsil Baseball Stadium	3:21	25,000

=== Semi-playoff ===
LG won the series, 3–1.

Game	Date	Score	Location	Time	Attendance
1	October 13	LG Twins 7 – Nexen Heroes 0	Gocheok Sky Dome	3:16	16,300
2	October 14	LG Twins 1 – Nexen Heroes 5	Gocheok Sky Dome	3:06	16,300
3	October 16	Nexen Heroes 1 – LG Twins 4	Jamsil Baseball Stadium	3:01	25,000
4	October 17	Nexen Heroes 4 – LG Twins 5	Jamsil Baseball Stadium	3:33	24,352

=== Playoff ===
NC won the series, 3–1.

Game	Date	Score	Location	Time	Attendance
1	October 21	LG Twins 2 – NC Dinos 3	Masan Baseball Stadium	3:35	11,000
2	October 22	LG Twins 0 – NC Dinos 2	Masan Baseball Stadium	2:29	11,000
3	October 24	NC Dinos 1 – LG Twins 2 (11)	Jamsil Baseball Stadium	4:46	25,000
4	October 25	NC Dinos 8 – LG Twins 3	Jamsil Baseball Stadium	4:00	25,000

=== Korean Series ===
Doosan won the series, 4–0.

Game	Date	Score	Location	Time	Attendance
1	October 29	NC Dinos 0 – Doosan Bears 1 (11)	Jamsil Baseball Stadium	3:51	25,000
2	October 30	NC Dinos 1 – Doosan Bears 5	Jamsil Baseball Stadium	3:10	25,000
3	November 1	Doosan Bears 6 – NC Dinos 0	Masan Baseball Stadium	3:17	11,000
4	November 2	Doosan Bears 8 – NC Dinos 1	Masan Baseball Stadium	3:24	11,000

== Foreign players ==
Each team could have signed up to three foreign players. Due to the high proportion of pitchers signed in previous years, beginning in 2014 the league mandated that at least one of the foreign players must be a position player. Also with the KT Wiz being an expansion team that started play in 2015, they were given an exemption and were allowed to sign four foreign players instead of just the normally allowed three.

Team	Player	Position	In KBO since	Salary	Notes
Samsung Lions	Allen Webster	Pitcher	2016	$850,000	
Samsung Lions	Collin Balester	Pitcher	2016	$500,000	Released
Samsung Lions	Arnold León	Pitcher	2016	$500,000	Signed to replace Collin Balester
Samsung Lions	Aarom Baldiris	Infielder	2016	$950,000	
NC Dinos	Zach Stewart	Pitcher	2015	$750,000	
NC Dinos	Eric Hacker	Pitcher	2014	$900,000	
NC Dinos	Eric Thames	Infielder	2013	$1,500,000	KBO All-Star
Doosan Bears	Dustin Nippert	Pitcher	2011	$1,200,000	KBO All-Star, KBO MVP
Doosan Bears	Michael Bowden	Pitcher	2016	$650,000	pitched no-hitter on 6/30/16 against NC Dinos
Doosan Bears	Nick Evans	First Baseman / Outfielder	2016	$550,000	
Nexen Heroes	Ryan Feierabend	Pitcher	2015	$580,000	Released mid-season; picked up by KT Wiz
Nexen Heroes	Robert Coello	Pitcher	2016	$550,000	Released
Nexen Heroes	Danny Dorn	First Baseman / Outfielder	2016	$750,000	
Nexen Heroes	Scott McGregor	Pitcher	2016	$150,000	Signed to replace Robert Coello
SK Wyverns	Merrill Kelly	Pitcher	2015	$750,000	KBO All-Star
SK Wyverns	Chris Seddon	Pitcher	2013	$500,000	Released
SK Wyverns	Héctor Gómez	Infielder	2016	$650,000	
SK Wyverns	Braulio Lara	Pitcher	2016	$230,000	Signed to replace Chris Seddon
Hanwha Eagles	Esmil Rogers	Pitcher	2015	$1,900,000	Released
Hanwha Eagles	Alex Maestri	Pitcher	2016	¥50,000,000 (about $440,000)	Released
Hanwha Eagles	Wilin Rosario	Catcher / Infielder	2016	$1,300,000	KBO All-Star
Hanwha Eagles	Fabio Castillo	Pitcher	2016	$250,000	Signed to replace Alex Maestri
Hanwha Eagles	Eric Surkamp	Pitcher	2016	$450,000	Signed to replace Esmil Rogers
Kia Tigers	Héctor Noesí	Pitcher	2016	$1,700,000	KBO All-Star
Kia Tigers	Zeke Spruill	Pitcher	2016	$700,000	
Kia Tigers	Brett Pill	Infielder	2014	$900,000	
Lotte Giants	Josh Lindblom	Pitcher	2015	$1,200,000	
Lotte Giants	Brooks Raley	Pitcher	2015	$680,000	
Lotte Giants	Jim Adduci	Outfielder	2015	$780,000	Released
Lotte Giants	Justin Maxwell	Outfielder	2016	$280,000	Signed to replace Jim Adduci
LG Twins	Henry Sosa	Pitcher	2012	$900,000	
LG Twins	Luis Jimenez	Infielder	2015	$900,000	KBO All-Star
LG Twins	Scott Copeland	Pitcher	2016	$750,000	Released
LG Twins	David Huff	Pitcher	2016	$550,000	Signed to replace Scott Copeland
KT Wiz	Yohan Pino	Pitcher	2016	$500,000	
KT Wiz	Sugar Ray Marimón	Pitcher	2016	$600,000	Released
KT Wiz	Travis Banwart	Pitcher	2014	$600,000	
KT Wiz	Andy Marte	Infielder	2015	$850,000	
KT Wiz	Josh Lowey	Pitcher	2016	$220,000	Signed to replace Sugar Ray Marimón

=== Foreign hitters ===
Team	Player	Batting Average	Home runs	RBI	Notes
Doosan Bears	Nick Evans	.308	24	81	
Hanwha Eagles	Wilin Rosario	.321	33	120	KBO All-Star
Kia Tigers	Brett Pill	.313	20	86	
KT Wiz	Andy Marte	.265	22	74	
LG Twins	Luis Jiménez	.308	26	102	KBO All-Star
Lotte Giants	Jim Adduci	.291	7	41	Released by the team
Lotte Giants	Justin Maxwell	.288	4	16	
NC Dinos	Eric Thames	.321	40	121	KBO Home run leader, KBO SLG leader, KBO All-Star, Golden Glove Award
Nexen Heroes	Danny Dorn	.295	16	70	
Samsung Lions	Aarom Baldiris	.266	8	33	
SK Wyverns	Héctor Gómez	.283	21	62	

== Attendances ==
Team	Total attendance	Home average
Doosan Bears	1,165,020	16,180
LG Twins	1,157,646	16,078
SK Wyverns	865,194	12,016
Lotte Giants	852,639	11,842
Samsung Lions	851,417	11,825
Nexen Heroes	782,121	10,862
KIA Tigers	773,499	10,743
KT Wiz	682,444	9,478
Hanwha Eagles	660,472	9,173
NC Dinos	549,125	7,627
