= Deibinson Romero =

Dominican baseball player (born 1986)

- Third baseman / First baseman
- Born: September 24, 1986 (age 39); Pedernales, Dominican Republic
- Batted: Right Threw: Right

KBO debut
- June 5, 2015, for the Doosan Bears

Last KBO appearance
- October 2, 2015, for the Doosan Bears

KBO statistics
- Batting average: .253
- Home runs: 12
- Runs batted in: 50
- Stats at Baseball Reference

Teams
- Doosan Bears (2015)

Career highlights and awards
- Korean Series champion (2015)

Deibinson Joel Romero (born September 24, 1986) is a Dominican former professional baseball third baseman. He has previously played in the KBO League for the Doosan Bears.

== Career ==
=== Minnesota Twins ===
Romero signed with the Minnesota Twins in July 2004. Romero suffered a broken leg in July 2008. The Twins added Romero to their 40-man roster on November 19, 2008, in order to protect him from the Rule 5 draft. On November 20, 2009, the Twins removed Romero from their 40-man roster. He spent the 2010 season with the High-A Fort Myers Miracle. He then spent the 2011 and 2012 seasons with the Double-A New Britain Rock Cats.

On November 20, 2012, Romero re-signed with the Twins organization on a minor league contract. He was invited to Spring Training in 2013 and 2014 but did not make the club either year and spent both seasons in the minors.

=== Pittsburgh Pirates ===
Romero signed with the Pittsburgh Pirates on a minor league contract on December 1, 2014. Fangraphs described him as a top minor league free agent. With the Pirates' Triple-A Indianapolis Indians, Romero played in 37 games, batting .301 (37 hits in 123 at-bats), with 6 home runs, 27 RBI, a .396 OBP, and a .545 slugging percentage. He was released by the Pirates in May 2015 to pursue an opportunity in Korea.

=== Doosan Bears ===
On May 26, 2015, Romero agreed to a contract with the Doosan Bears. He replaced Zach Lutz on the Bears roster as the foreign hitter. He made his KBO debut on June 5, 2015. Romero slashed .253/.328/.449 with 12 home runs and 50 RBI in 76 games. He won the Korean Series with the Bears in 2015.

=== New York Yankees ===
On February 1, 2016, Romero signed a minor league contract with the New York Yankees. In 17 appearances for the Triple-A Scranton/Wilkes-Barre RailRiders, he batted .132/.242/.226 with one home run and six RBI. Romero was released by the Yankees organization on May 29.

=== Delfines del Carmen ===
On June 7, 2016, Romero signed with the Delfines del Carmen of the Mexican League. In 13 appearances for Carmen, he batted .262/.360/.476 with two home runs and seven RBI.

=== Rojos del Águila de Veracruz ===
On June 28, 2016, Romero was traded to the Rojos del Águila de Veracruz of the Mexican League. In two appearances for Veracruz, he went 0-for-6. Romero was released by the Rojos on July 1, 2016.

Romero re-signed with the team on March 31, 2017. In 72 appearances for Veracruz, he slashed .269/.352/.370 with six home runs, 36 RBI, and one stolen base. Romero was released again on July 10.

=== New Britain Bees ===
On March 6, 2018, Romero signed with the New Britain Bees of the Atlantic League of Professional Baseball in 120 games he hit .255/.344/.437 with 18 home runs and 71 RBIs. He re-signed with team in early 2019 in 43 games he hit .266/.364/.364 with 3 home runs and 12 RBIs.

Before the 2019 season, he was selected for Dominican Republic national baseball team at the 2019 Pan American Games Qualifier.

=== Long Island Ducks ===
On June 25, 2019, Romero was traded to the Long Island Ducks of the Atlantic League of Professional Baseball. Romero was named MVP of the 2019 ALPB Championship Series, leading all players in RBIs (9) and tying for the lead in total bases (15) and home runs (2). He re-signed with the Ducks for the 2020 season but did not play in a game due to the cancellation of the ALPB season because of the COVID-19 pandemic.

On June 29, 2021, Romero re-signed with the Ducks. Romero hit .252/.388/.430 with 10 home runs and 47 RBI in 79 games for the Ducks in 2021. He became a free agent following the season. On March 11, 2022, Romero re-signed with the Ducks for the 2022 season.

=== Staten Island FerryHawks ===
On March 28, 2023, Romero was traded to the Staten Island FerryHawks of the Atlantic League of Professional Baseball. In 29 games for Staten Island, he hit .191/.274/.286 with 1 home run and 12 RBI. On July 18, Romero was released by the team.
