= Erick Fedde =

American baseball player (born 1993)

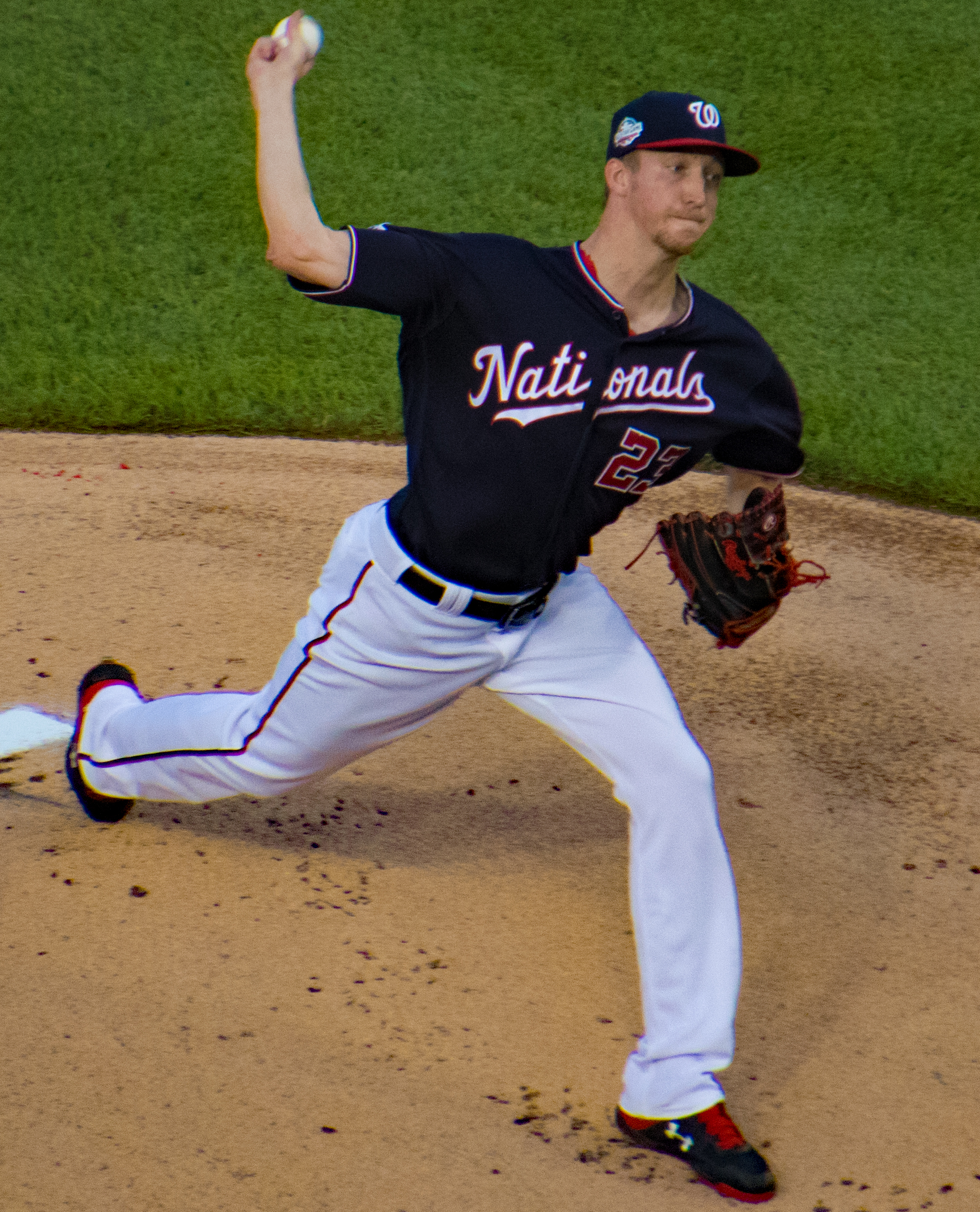
- Fedde with the Washington Nationals in 2018

Free agent
- Pitcher
- Born: February 25, 1993 (age 33); Las Vegas, Nevada, U.S.
- Bats: Right Throws: Right

Professional debut
- MLB: July 30, 2017, for the Washington Nationals
- KBO: April 1, 2023, for the NC Dinos

MLB statistics (through 2026 season)
- Win–loss record: 42–64
- Earned run average: 4.77
- Strikeouts: 688

KBO statistics (through 2023 season)
- Win–loss record: 20–6
- Earned run average: 2.00
- Strikeouts: 209
- Stats at Baseball Reference

Teams
- Washington Nationals (2017–2022); NC Dinos (2023); Chicago White Sox (2024); St. Louis Cardinals (2024–2025); Atlanta Braves (2025); Milwaukee Brewers (2025); Chicago White Sox (2026)

Career highlights and awards
- KBO: Choi Dong-won Award (2023); KBO League MVP (2023); KBO All-Star (2023); KBO Golden Glove Award (2023); KBO Wins leader (2023); KBO ERA leader (2023); KBO Strikeout leader (2023)

Erick James Fedde (born February 25, 1993) is an American professional baseball pitcherwho is a free agent. He has played in Major League Baseball (MLB) for the Chicago White Sox, Washington Nationals, St. Louis Cardinals, Atlanta Braves, and Milwaukee Brewers, and in the KBO League for the NC Dinos. He played college baseball at the University of Nevada, Las Vegas.

== Amateur career ==
Fedde attended Las Vegas High School in Sunrise Manor, Nevada. He was a pitcher and an outfielder. Among his teammates was catcher Bryce Harper, who would go on to become the 2010 Major League Baseball draft's top overall pick, as well as Fedde's future Nationals' teammate. Fedde was drafted by the San Diego Padres in the 24th round of the 2011 Major League Baseball draft, but did not sign, instead attending the University of Nevada, Las Vegas (UNLV).

Fedde started 15 games for the UNLV Rebels as a freshman in 2012. He finished the year 6–5 with a 3.59 earned run average (ERA) and 66 strikeouts in 90 1/3 innings. As a sophomore in 2013, he again started 15 games, going 7–5 with a 3.92 ERA and 83 strikeouts in 96 1/3 innings. During the summer he pitched for the United States collegiate national team, and briefly played collegiate summer baseball in the Cape Cod Baseball League for the Yarmouth-Dennis Red Sox. In his first start of the 2014 season he struck out a career high 11 batters and allowed only one hit. In May 2014, Fedde underwent Tommy John surgery, ending his season. He finished the season 8–2 with a 1.76 ERA and 82 strikeouts in 76 2/3 innings.

== Professional career ==
=== Washington Nationals ===
Fedde was considered a top prospect for the 2014 Major League Baseball draft, and the Nationals selected him in the first round, 18th overall. He signed with the Nationals on July 18, for $2.51 million. Fedde did not play at all in 2014 due to injury. He spent 2015 with both the Auburn Doubledays and the Hagerstown Suns, where he posted a combined 5–3 record and 3.38 ERA between the two clubs. Fedde began the 2016 season with the Potomac Nationals, and was promoted to the Harrisburg Senators in August. Fedde ended 2016 with an 8–5 record along with a 3.12 ERA.

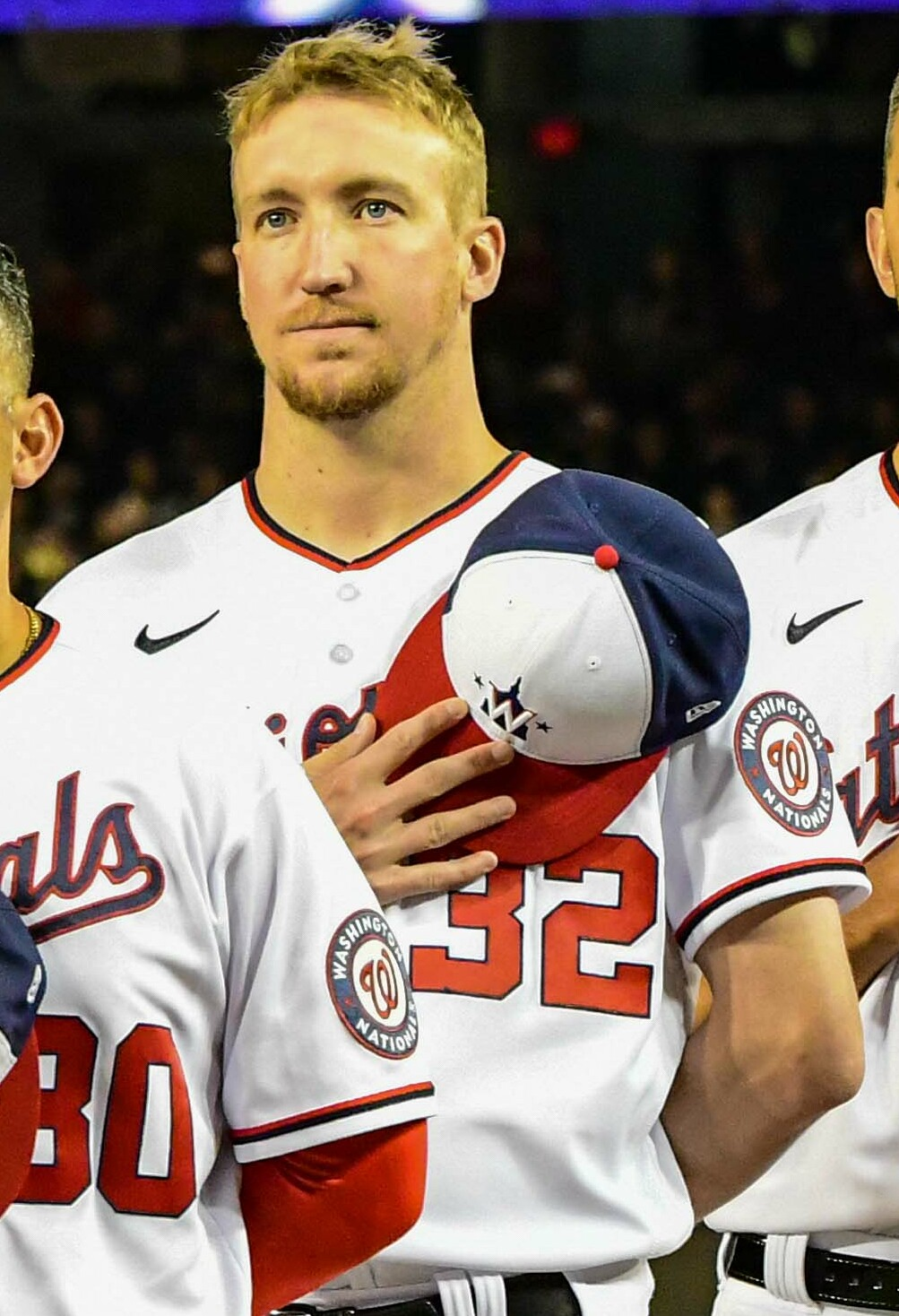
Fedde in 2022

During the Nationals' 2017 season, with the team struggling with its bullpen during the first half, Fedde was temporarily moved to a relief role. While pitching out of the bullpen, he was promoted from Double–A Harrisburg to the Triple–A Syracuse Chiefs on June 13, 2017. After less than a month, Fedde was switched back to starting. The move proved fortuitous for the Nationals, who lost Joe Ross from their rotation in July after he tore his UCL and saw veteran starter Stephen Strasburg lose time due to a nerve impingement in his throwing arm.

Fedde was promoted to the major leagues to start the first game of a double-header against the Colorado Rockies on July 30, 2017. On August 7, Fedde was optioned back to Syracuse after the return of Gio González from paternity leave. Fedde improved on his 9.39 ERA from the previous year in 2018, pitching to a 5.54 ERA with 46 strikeouts across 50 1/3 innings of work.

In the 2019 season, Fedde continued his improvement, registering a 4.50 ERA with 41 strikeouts in a career-high 78 innings of work. He pitched in 21 games but did not pitch in the postseason, which saw the Nationals win the 2019 World Series. In 2020, Fedde was 2–4 with a 4.29 ERA and 28 strikeouts. He gave up a ball hit off of him with the highest exit velocity of all balls hit off of major league pitchers in the 2020 season, at 121.3 mph by Giancarlo Stanton.

Fedde pitched in 29 games (starting 27) for the Nationals in 2021, accumulating a 7–9 record and 5.47 ERA with 128 strikeouts over 133 1/3 innings pitched. He made 27 starts for Washington in 2022, compiling a 6–13 record and 5.81 ERA with 94 strikeouts across 127 innings. On November 18, 2022, the Nationals did not tender a contract offer for the 2023 season to Fedde, making him a free agent. He had an overall 21–33 record and a 5.41 ERA for the Nationals.

=== NC Dinos ===
After receiving only minor league contract offers from MLB teams, Fedde signed with the NC Dinos of the KBO League on a one-year contract for $1 million, the maximum allowed for a foreign player. Fedde was named an All–Star for the Dinos in 2023. In 30 starts for the club, he registered a 20–6 record and 2.00 ERA with 209 strikeouts in 180 1/3 innings pitched. He won the pitching Triple Crown in turn, and became the first foreign pitcher to log 20 wins and 200+ strikeouts in a season. Following the season, he won the Choi Dong-won Award, the KBO equivalent to the Cy Young Award, and the KBO League Most Valuable Player Award.

=== Chicago White Sox ===
On December 13, 2023, Fedde signed a two-year, $15 million contract with the Chicago White Sox. In 21 starts for the White Sox in 2024, Fedde compiled a 7–4 record and 3.11 ERA with 108 strikeouts across 121 2/3 innings pitched.

=== St. Louis Cardinals ===
On July 29, 2024, the White Sox traded Fedde to the St. Louis Cardinals as part of a three-team deal that also sent Tommy Pham and a player to be named later to St. Louis, sent Tommy Edman, Michael Kopech, and Oliver Gonzalez to the Los Angeles Dodgers, and sent Miguel Vargas, Alexander Albertus, Jeral Pérez and a player to be named later to the White Sox. He made 10 starts down the stretch for St. Louis, registering a 2–5 record and 3.72 ERA with 46 strikeouts across 55 2/3 innings pitched.

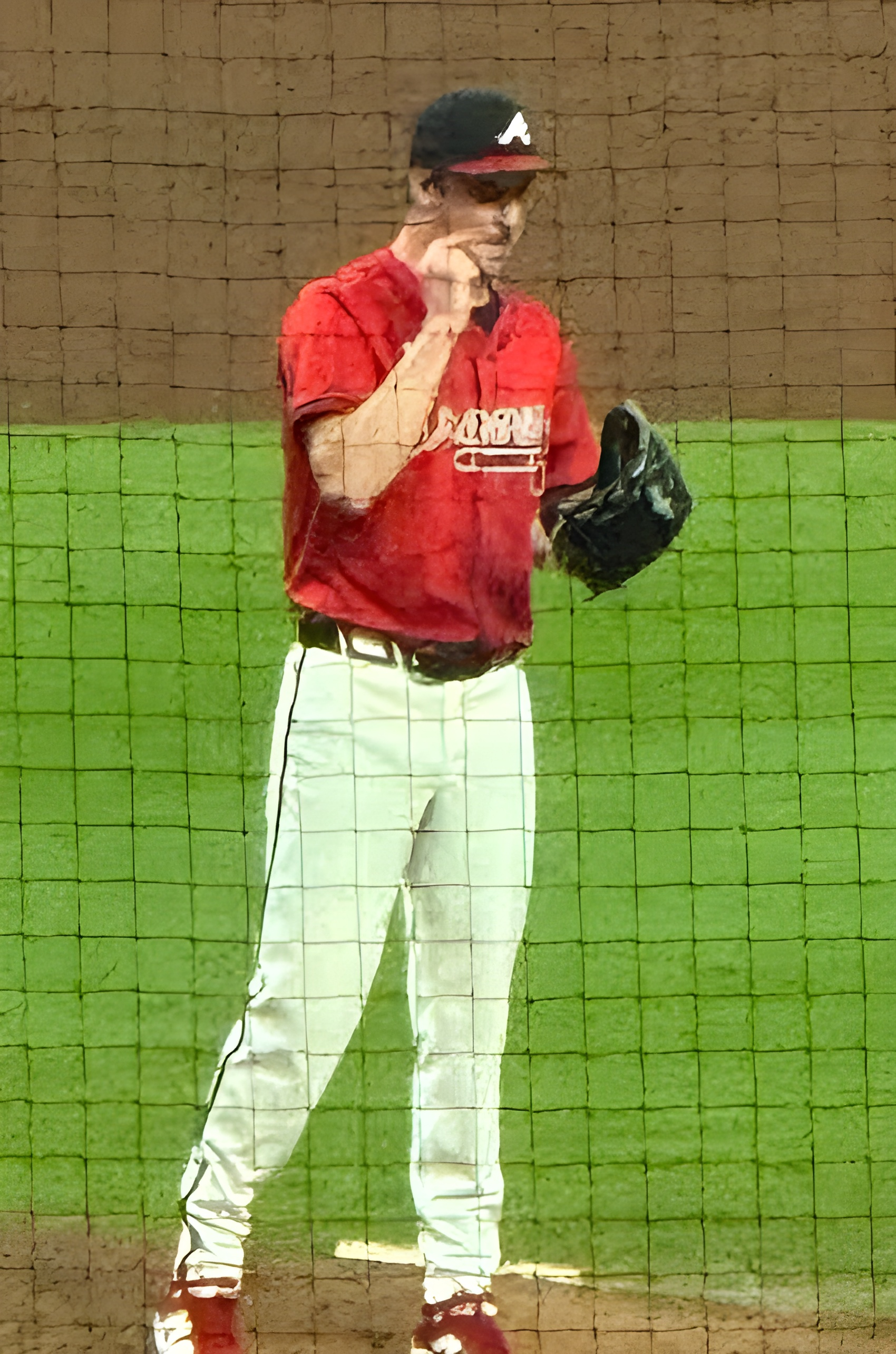
Fedde in 2025

On May 9, 2025, Fedde pitched a complete-game shutout against his former team, the Washington Nationals. In 20 appearances for St. Louis during the year, he compiled a 3–10 record and 5.22 ERA with 63 strikeouts across 101 2/3 innings pitched. Fedde was designated for assignment by the Cardinals on July 23.

=== Atlanta Braves ===
On July 27, 2025, the Cardinals traded Fedde, along with cash considerations, to the Atlanta Braves in exchange for a player to be named later or cash considerations. In five appearances (four starts) for Atlanta, he struggled to a 1–2 record and 8.10 ERA with 13 strikeouts across 23 1/3 innings pitched. On August 24, Fedde was released by the Braves.

=== Milwaukee Brewers ===
On August 27, 2025, Fedde signed a one-year contract with the Milwaukee Brewers. He made seven appearances for the Brewers, logging an 0-1 record and 3.38 ERA with seven strikeouts over 16 innings of work. On September 28, Fedde was designated for assignment by Milwaukee; he cleared waivers and was sent outright to the Triple-A Nashville Sounds on September 30. He elected free agency on October 18.

=== Chicago White Sox (second stint) ===
On February 10, 2026, Fedde signed a one-year, $1.5 million contract with the Chicago White Sox.
