= Chang Won-jun =

South Korean baseball player

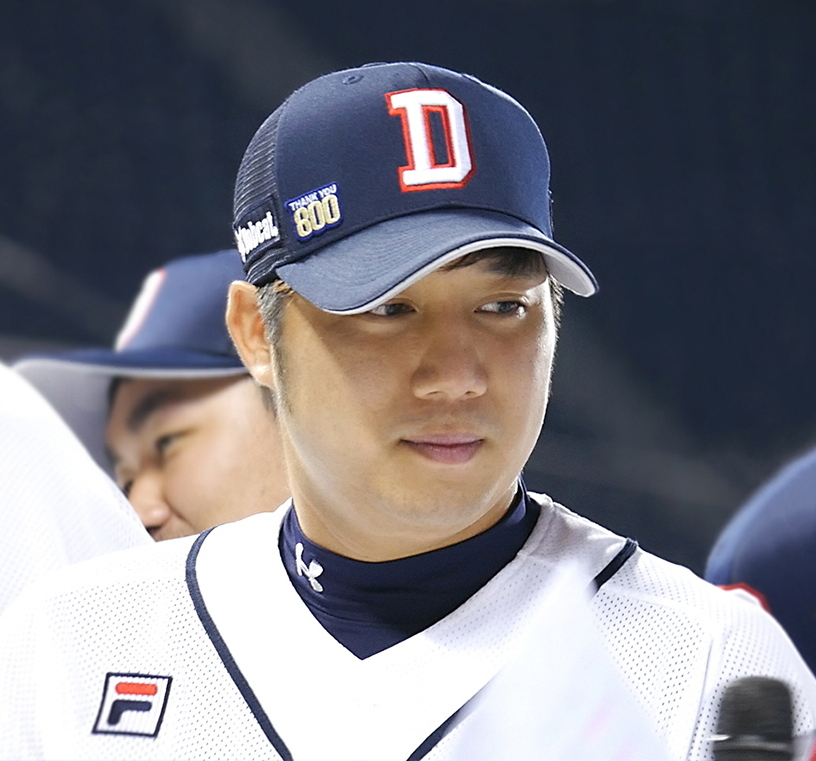
- Pitcher
- Born: July 31, 1985 (age 39); Seoul, South Korea
- Batted: Left Threw: Left

KBO debut
- 2004, for the Lotte Giants

Last KBO appearance
- October 17, 2023, for the Doosan Bears

KBO statistics
- Win–loss record: 132–119
- Earned run average: 4.28
- Strikeouts: 1,385

Teams
- Lotte Giants (2004–2014); Doosan Bears (2015–2023)
Medals
Men's baseball
Representing South Korea
2015 WBSC Premier12
Gold medal – first place	2015 Tokyo	Team

Chang Won-jun (Korean: 장원준; Hanja: 張元準; born July 31, 1985) is a South Korean pitcher who played for the Doosan Bears of the KBO League.

== Professional career ==
He joined the Lotte Giants in the first draft in 2004, and played for the team between 2004 and 2014. On November 26, 2014, he declared it to be in the free agent market on the expiration of its preferential negotiation. After that, he signed an agreement with the Doosan Bears on November 29, 2014.

=== International career ===
Chang represented South Korea at the 2017 World Baseball Classic.

Year	Venue	Competition	Team	Individual statistics
2007	Chinese Taipei	Baseball World Cup	5th	1–1; 2.12 ERA (3 G, 17.0 IP, 4 ER, 15 K)
