= Josh Lindblom =

American baseball player (born 1987)

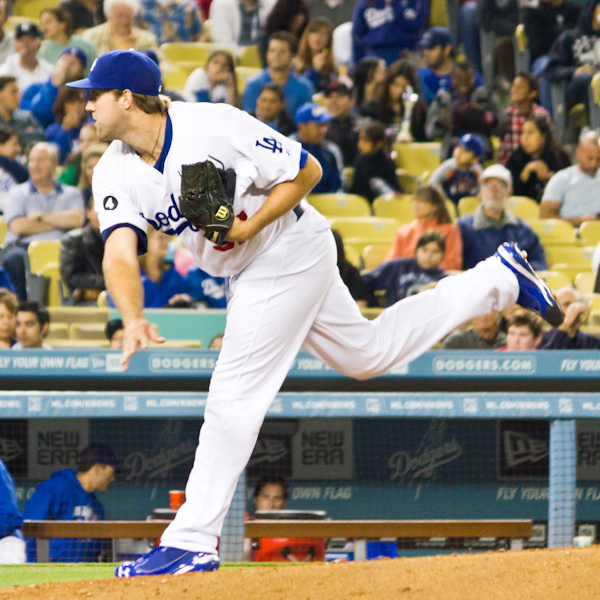
- Lindblom with the Los Angeles Dodgers in 2011
- Pitcher
- Born: June 15, 1987 (age 39); Lafayette, Indiana, U.S.
- Batted: Right Threw: Right

Professional debut
- MLB: June 1, 2011, for the Los Angeles Dodgers
- KBO: March 31, 2015, for the Lotte Giants

Last appearance
- MLB: May 25, 2021, for the Milwaukee Brewers
- KBO: September 28, 2019, for the Doosan Bears

MLB statistics
- Win–loss record: 7–12
- Earned run average: 4.78
- Strikeouts: 200

KBO statistics
- Win–loss record: 63–34
- Earned run average: 3.55
- Strikeouts: 750
- Stats at Baseball Reference

Teams
- Los Angeles Dodgers (2011–2012); Philadelphia Phillies (2012); Texas Rangers (2013); Oakland Athletics (2014); Lotte Giants (2015–2016); Pittsburgh Pirates (2017); Lotte Giants (2017); Doosan Bears (2018–2019); Milwaukee Brewers (2020–2021)

Career highlights and awards
- KBO League MVP (2019); Korean Series champion (2019); 2x Choi Dong-won Award (2018, 2019); KBO Wins leader (2019); KBO ERA leader (2018); KBO Strikeout leader (2019)

Joshua William Lindblom (born June 15, 1987) is an American former professional baseball pitcher. He played in Major League Baseball (MLB) for the Los Angeles Dodgers, Philadelphia Phillies, Texas Rangers, Oakland Athletics, Pittsburgh Pirates, and Milwaukee Brewers and in the KBO League for the Lotte Giants and Doosan Bears.

== Career ==
=== Amateur and minor league career ===
Lindblom attended Harrison High School in West Lafayette, Indiana. He was drafted in the third round of the 2005 MLB draft by the Houston Astros after being listed by Baseball America as the top prospect in the state of Indiana. He was 8–2 as a high school senior with a 2.30 ERA and 117 strikeouts in 76 innings. Rather than sign with the Astros, Lindblom chose to attend the University of Tennessee.

After one season with the Tennessee Volunteers, Lindblom transferred to Purdue University for the 2007 season. He was a starter with Tennessee, but became the closer for Purdue in 2007–2008. Lindblom was listed as being among the 75 top college baseball players by USA Baseball. In 2007, he played collegiate summer baseball with the Cotuit Kettleers of the Cape Cod Baseball League and was named a league all-star.

=== Los Angeles Dodgers ===
Lindblom was drafted by the Los Angeles Dodgers in the 2nd round of the 2008 MLB draft and made his professional baseball debut that same year with the Single-A Great Lakes Loons in the Midwest League. He started eight games for the Loons, finishing 0–0 with a 1.86 ERA in 29 innings worked. He struck out 33 batters, while walking only 4. He got a late season call-up to the AA Jacksonville Suns, where he made one start.

In 2009, Lindblom pitched in several spring training games for the Major League Dodgers, and there was some speculation that he could even make the big league club to start the season. However, he was instead assigned to start the year with the Dodgers new AA affiliate, the Chattanooga Lookouts. He made 14 appearances for the Lookouts, including 11 starts and had a record of 3–5 and an ERA of 4.71 when he was promoted to the AAA Albuquerque Isotopes. With the Isotopes, Lindblom made three starts and then was transferred to the bullpen. He had a 2.54 ERA in 20 games and was 3–0.

In 2010, Lindblom spent the entire season with Albuquerque. He made 10 starts with the Isotopes, before they decided to return him to being a relief pitcher. He finished the season 3–2 with a 6.54 ERA in 40 appearances. He was demoted to Chattanooga in 2011, where he started the season with seven saves and a 2.96 ERA in 19 games.

On May 29, 2011, Lindblom was called up to the Dodgers. He made his Major League debut in relief on June 1, 2011, against the Colorado Rockies, allowing two hits in a scoreless seventh inning during a 3–0 Dodgers loss. On August 12, 2011, he won his first game, pitching a scoreless tenth inning against the Houston Astros in a game the Dodgers won 1–0 in the bottom of that inning. He pitched in 29.2 innings for the Dodgers in 2011, with a 2.73 ERA and 28 strikeouts.

=== Philadelphia Phillies ===
On July 31, 2012, Lindblom was traded to the Philadelphia Phillies along with prospect Ethan Martin for outfielder Shane Victorino. He appeared in 26 games for the Phillies, with a 1–3 record and 4.63 ERA.

=== Texas Rangers ===
The Texas Rangers acquired Lindblom and minor league pitching prospect Lisalverto Bonilla on December 9, 2012, from the Philadelphia Phillies in exchange for Michael Young. Lindblom was called up on May 20 when Derek Lowe was designated for assignment and optioned back to the Triple-A Round Rock Express on May 21. He was recalled again on June 9.

=== Oakland Athletics ===
On December 3, 2013, Lindblom, along with outfielder Craig Gentry, was traded to the Oakland Athletics for outfielder Michael Choice and infielder Chris Bostick. He was designated for assignment on November 28, 2014.

=== Pittsburgh Pirates ===
The Pittsburgh Pirates claimed Lindblom off waivers on December 8, 2014.

=== Lotte Giants ===
On December 15, 2014, he signed with the Lotte Giants of the KBO League. He pitched there the next two seasons.

=== Second Stint With Pirates ===
On December 16, 2016, Lindblom signed a minor league contract with the Pittsburgh Pirates that included an invitation to spring training. On May 6, 2017, Lindblom was selected to the 40-man and active rosters after Jameson Taillon went down with an injury. He was outrighted to AAA on June 24, 2017. Lindblom was released by the Pirates on July 12, 2017.

=== Return to KBO ===
On July 13, 2017, the Lotte Giants announced that they had signed Lindblom again.

=== Doosan Bears ===
On December 11, 2017, the Doosan Bears announced the signing of Lindblom to a one-year, $1.45 million contract. 2018 was a successful season for Lindblom; he started 26 games with a 15–4 record, a league-leading 2.88 ERA, and the Pitcher's Golden Glove award. Lindblom received the 2019 KBO League Most Valuable Player Award, after posting a 20–3 record with a 2.50 ERA and 189 strikeouts over 194 2/3 innings. Lindblom received his second pitcher's Golden Glove award for the 2019 season.

=== Milwaukee Brewers ===
On December 16, 2019, Lindblom signed a three-year contract worth $9.125 million with the Milwaukee Brewers. In his return to the major leagues in 2020, Lindblom recorded a 2–4 record and a 5.16 ERA with 52 strikeouts in 45.1 innings pitched. After struggling to a 9.72 ERA in 8 appearances, Lindblom was designated for assignment on May 26, 2021. He was outrighted to the Triple-A Nashville Sounds on May 28. Lindblom played the entire 2022 season with Nashville and became a free agent after the season on November 6.

On January 12, 2023, Lindblom announced his retirement from professional baseball via his personal Twitter account.

== Pitching style ==
As a reliever, Lindblom relies chiefly on four-seam and two-seam fastballs around 91 mph and a high-80s cutter, although he also mixed in a curveball, a slider, and a changeup. He was moved to rotation and added an effective splitter to repertoire in his KBO career.

== Personal life ==
Lindblom is married to Aurielle Lindblom. They have three children: Presley, Palmer, and Monroe. Lindblom's daughter, Monroe, was born with a congenital heart defect that has required surgery.

Lindblom is a devoted Christian and attended Dream Center while playing in Los Angeles. Lindblom and his wife also established a charity which donated $20,000 to an Indiana food bank.
