= Park Sok-min =

South Korean baseball player

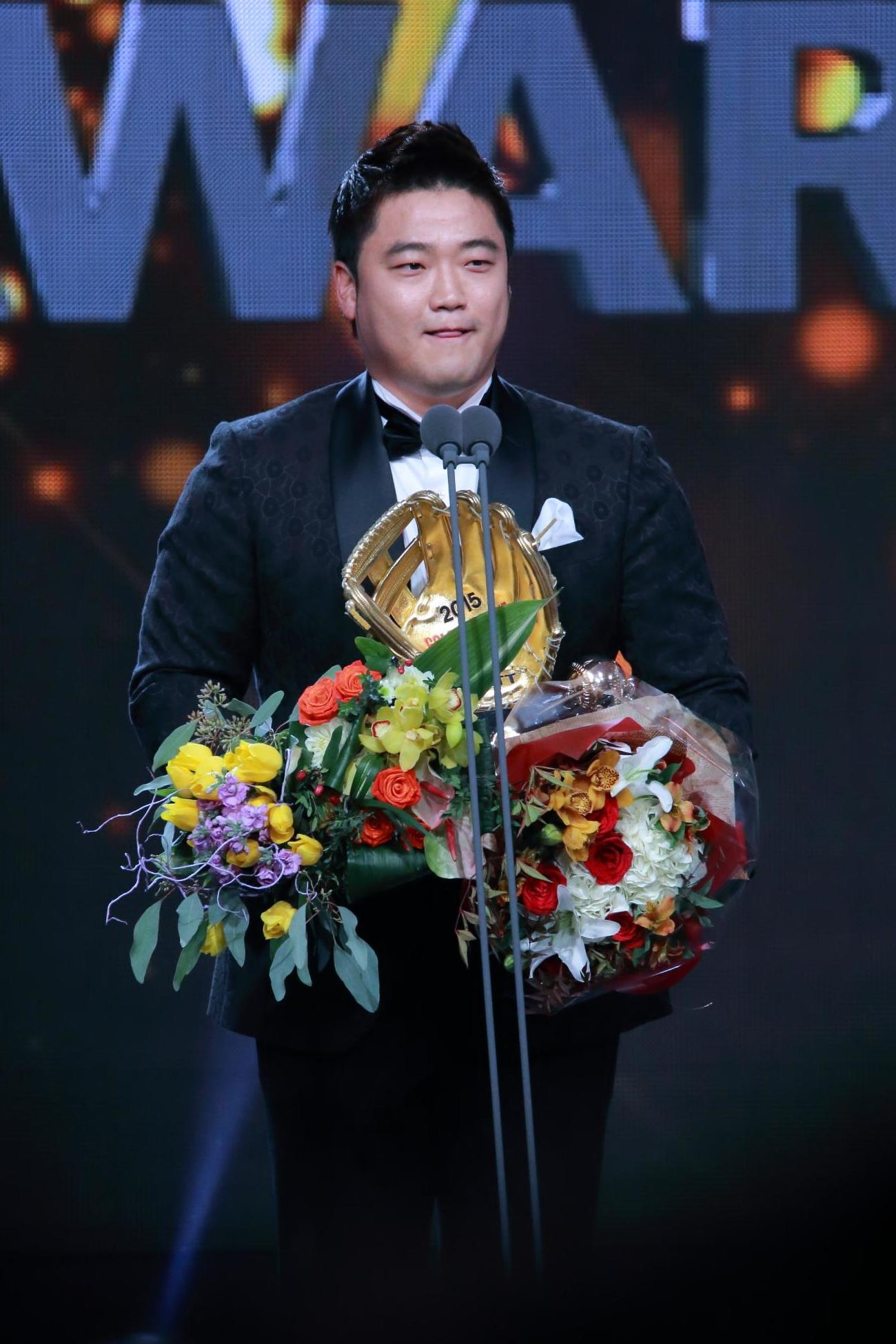

Yomiuri Giants – No. 108
- Infielder, Coach
- Born: June 22, 1985 (age 40)
- Batted: Right Threw: Right

KBO debut
- April 8, 2004, for the Samsung Lions

Last KBO appearance
- July 25, 2023, for the NC Dinos

KBO statistics (through August 1, 2019)
- Batting average: .292
- Home runs: 241
- Runs batted in: 918
- Stats at Baseball Reference

Teams
- As player: Samsung Lions (2004–2005, 2008–2015); Sangmu Phoenix (2006–2007); NC Dinos (2016–2023); As coach: Yomiuri Giants (2024–present)

- Park Sok-min
- Hangul: 박석민
- Hanja: 朴錫珉
- RR: Bak Seokmin
- MR: Pak Sŏngmin

Park Sok-min (Korean: 박석민; born June 22, 1985, in Daegu, South Korea) is a South Korean former baseball player. He played for the Samsung Lions and the NC Dinos in the Korea Baseball Organization. He is nicknamed Beu-Kol-Dwae (브콜돼). He bats and throws right-handed.

== Professional career ==
After graduating from Daegu High School in 2004, Park made himself eligible for the 2004 KBO Draft and was selected by the Samsung Lions in the first round of the draft. However, he failed to make an impact in the rookie season, serving backup infielder during the whole season. After the 2004 season, he served in the military by playing for the Sangmu Phoenix baseball team from 2006 to 2007.

In 2008, Park returned to the Lions and became the starting third baseman for Samsung.

In 2015, Park signed a four-year, $8.12 million, contract with the NC Dinos, becoming the most expensive third baseman—breaking the 4 year, $7.28 million mark previously set by Choi Jeong of the SK Wyverns—in the KBO.

On July 16, 2021, Park was suspended the remainder of the season (72 games with 70 games left) after breaking COVID-19 social distancing rules.

On 5 December 2025, he was appointed as the Samsung Lions second team batting coach.

== Characteristics ==
His nicknamed Beu-Kol-Dwae (브콜돼), which literally translates into broccoli + pig. This nickname derives from his stocky figure and curly hair.
