= Lee Hyun-seung (baseball) =

South Korean baseball player

- Relief pitcher
- Born: October 11, 1983 (age 42)
- Batted: Left Threw: Left

KBO debut
- April 8, 2006, for the Hyundai Unicorns

Last KBO appearance
- July 24, 2022, for the Doosan Bears

KBO statistics
- Win–loss record: 47–44
- Earned run average: 4.47
- Strikeouts: 610
- Stats at Baseball Reference

Teams
- Hyundai Unicorns (2006–2007); Woori Heroes (2008–2009); Doosan Bears (2010–2022)
Medals
Men's baseball
Representing South Korea
2015 WBSC Premier12
Gold medal – first place	2015 Tokyo	Team

Lee Hyun-seung (Korean: 이현승; Hanja: 李賢承; born October 11, 1983) is a South Korean left-handed relief pitcher who played for the Doosan Bears of the KBO League.

== Amateur career ==
As a junior at Dongsan High School in Incheon, South Korea, Lee was selected by the Hyundai Unicorns with the 26th pick in the 2nd round (34th overall) of the 2002 KBO Draft. Upon graduation from Dongsan High School, however, he chose to enter Inha University instead of turning pro directly.

As a freshman at Inha University in 2002, Lee made his first appearance for the South Korea national baseball team at the 2002 Intercontinental Cup. Lee, the youngest player on the roster, helped his team to claim the silver medal, coming on in relief as a left-handed specialist and pitching four scoreless innings in the tourney.

As a junior In 2004, Lee competed for the South Korea national baseball team in the 2nd World University Baseball Championship in Tainan City, Taiwan. There he led his team to bronze medal alongside Oh Seung-Hwan and Jang Won-Sam.

=== Notable international careers ===
Year	Venue	Competition	Team
2002	Cuba	Intercontinental Cup	Silver medal
2004	Chinese Taipei	World University Championship	Bronze medal
2005	Japan	Asian Championship	4th

== Professional career ==
Lee was signed by the Hyundai Unicorns in 2006 and had a successful rookie season as a setup man and left-handed specialist, appearing in 70 games and being 3rd in the KBO league in holds with 19. After the season, Lee competed for the South Korea national baseball team in the 2006 Intercontinental Cup. In the round-robin, he earned a save, pitching two scoreless innings to close out a 5–1 win over Italy. In the 5th-8th classification game, however, he blew a save opportunity, allowing three runs in the 9th inning of an 8–3 loss to Italy.

In 2007, Lee suffered a case of the sophomore jinx, slipping to 1–2 with a 7.15 ERA in 22.2 innings pitched and earning only 2 holds in 45 games. He spent most of the season in the reserve team of the Unicorns.

Lee earned a spot in the starting rotation for the 2008 season. In his first year as a full-time starter, he ended the season with a record of 6 wins and 11 losses and a 4.58 ERA in 120 innings pitched.

In 2009, Lee had his best pro season. As a full-time starter, he was 4th in wins (13), 5th in innings pitched (170.0), 10th in strikeouts (120) and 11th in ERA (4.18), all of which were career bests. However, on December 30, Lee was traded to the Doosan Bears for pitcher Keum Min-Chul and one billion won, involved in the Heroes' postseason blockbuster trades.

In 2010 Lee started his first season in the Bears as a starter, but was demoted to the bullpen in the middle of the season due to finger injuries and ongoing trouble with his command. He finished the season with a 4.75 ERA in 77.2 innings pitched and a 3–6 record. In the postseason, however, Lee played a major role in the Bears' bullpen, going 1–0 with a 0.96 ERA in 7 games, compiling 11 strikeouts in 9.1 innings pitched.

In 2011 Lee spent the entire season in relief, compiling a 3–5 record with four saves, six holds and a 4.82 ERA in 74.2 innings of work spread over 50 appearances.

=== Notable international careers ===
Year	Venue	Competition	Team	Individual Note
2006	Chinese Taipei	Intercontinental Cup	7th	0–1, 1 SV
2015	Japan	Premier12	Gold medal	0–1, 1 SV
2017	South Korea	World Baseball Classic	10th	0–1, 1 SV

== Nickname ==
He made the bases loaded and often showed his escape from the crisis, earning him the nickname of a bases-loaded pervert from his fans.
