= Choi Jae-hoon =

South Korean writer (born 1973)

Choi Jae-hoon (Hangul 최제훈; born 1973) is a South Korean writer. Rather than following the Korean literary tradition, he draws inspiration primarily from Western literature. His short story collection Kwireubal namjagui seong (퀴르발 남작의 성 The Castle of Baron Curval) is replete with film and pop culture references like crime fiction by Arthur Conan Doyle and Agatha Christie as well as subculture elements like the vampire, Frankenstein's monster, and cannibalism. Citing The Catcher in the Rye as his favorite book, Choi said in an interview that it is what piqued his interest in the novel and he has read all existing translations of the work into Korean.

Choi's novels have been well-received in South Korea. Kwireubal namjagui seong (The Castle of Baron Curval), in particular, was featured in the South Korean TV show The Secret Readers Club, suggesting its popular appeal and literary value.

== Life ==
Choi Jae-hoon was born in Seoul, South Korea in 1973. He studied business at Yonsei University and creative writing at the Seoul Institute of the Arts. He made his literary debut in 2007 when his short story “Kwireubal namjagui seong” (퀴르발 남작의 성 The Castle of Baron Curval), inspired by the character President Curval in Marquis de Sade’s 120 Days of Sodom, won the New Writer’s Award from Literature and Society. His first novel Ilgop gaeui goyangi nun (일곱 개의 고양이 눈 Seven Cat Eyes) consists of four novellas, where each plot is connected to the next like a never-ending chain and unfolds like a mystery novel. It won the 44th Hankook Ilbo Literary Award.

As a high school student, Choi was unsure of his career aspirations and chose to study business in university over the liberal arts for practical reasons. While serving his compulsory term in the South Korean military, however, he contemplated his future and decided to write because it was what he liked and did best. He set a preliminary goal of reading a hundred books during his military service, and by the end of his term he managed to read 103 titles ranging from classics by Dostoyevsky and Tolstoy to bestsellers by Haruki Murakami. When he told his friends he would become a novelist, they responded with incredulity. No one in his family had nurtured any artistic ambitions. His father, a civil servant, supposedly joked, “You really are Choi Chiwon’s descendant. It looks like those genes have finally passed onto someone, after thirty-four generations!”

After completing his military service, Choi returned to school and sat in on Korean literature and psychology classes, training to be a writer on his own. When he felt he needed to study creative writing in earnest for two or so years, he enrolled in the Seoul Institute of the Arts. After he completed his creative writing degree, he looked for a job that would ensure enough free time to write on the side. He joined a university as a staff member. He quit after four years, deciding that balancing a full-time job with a writing career was becoming difficult. He began writing full-time in 2006, submitted his works to writing contests in 2007, and made his literary debut that same year.

== Writing ==
Literary critic Lee Gyeong-jae likens Choi Jae-hoon's novels to a maze in which texts mirror one another and the author and reader face each other through the act of reading: “Choi Jae-hoon uses pop-culture tropes and humanities material to create narratives that effectively show ‘there is nothing outside the text.’ Moreover, each of his works are underpinned by such compelling logic and intelligence that they have an almost scientific precision. You would be hard-pressed to find any scenes in his novels that unabashedly regurgitate post-modernistic cliches everyone already knows about. Texts cannot be separated from the context in which they are placed. But as was mentioned earlier, if reality, desire, history, or other contextual issues are fundamentally linked to language, then they are also texts in themselves. This is why in Choi Jae-hoon’s fictional worlds, there are no paths leading readers outside the text.”

Another literary critic Nam Jin-wu compares Choi's maze-like narratives to M. C. Escher’s prints:

“At first glance, his novels seem like sturdy structures built on solid ground, but once inside you realize they are surrealistic mazes comprising countless rooms, corridors, doors, and staircases. When you pass through this world, which the writer has constructed with precise control, you experience time and space in a way that defies the laws of nature or causality. In this sense, Choi can be called a modernist, yet he is distinct from the aesthetic avant-garde who write free-spirited works relying on their instinctive sentimentality or sensitivity; he might thus be described has an intellectual avant-garde who writes based on constructive precisionism. He is interested in the chaos that paradoxically ensues when intellectual games are pushed to the extreme.”

== Works ==
1. 『나비잠』, 문학과지성사, 2013년.

From the Sleep of Babes. Moonji, 2013.

2. 『일곱 개의 고양이 눈』, 자음과모음, 2011년.

Seven Cat Eyes. Jaeum & Moeum, 2011.

3. 『퀴르발 남작의 성』, 문학과지성사, 2007년.

The Castle of Baron Curval. Moonji, 2007.

=== Works in translation ===
1. 库勒巴尔男爵的城堡 (Chinese)
2. Le Château du Baron de Quirval (French)
3. SEPT YEUX DE CHATS (French)

== Awards ==
- 2011: 44th Hankook Ilbo Literary Award
- 2007: 7th New Writer's Award from Literature and Society
