= Daegu Baseball Stadium =

Stadium in Daegu, South Korea

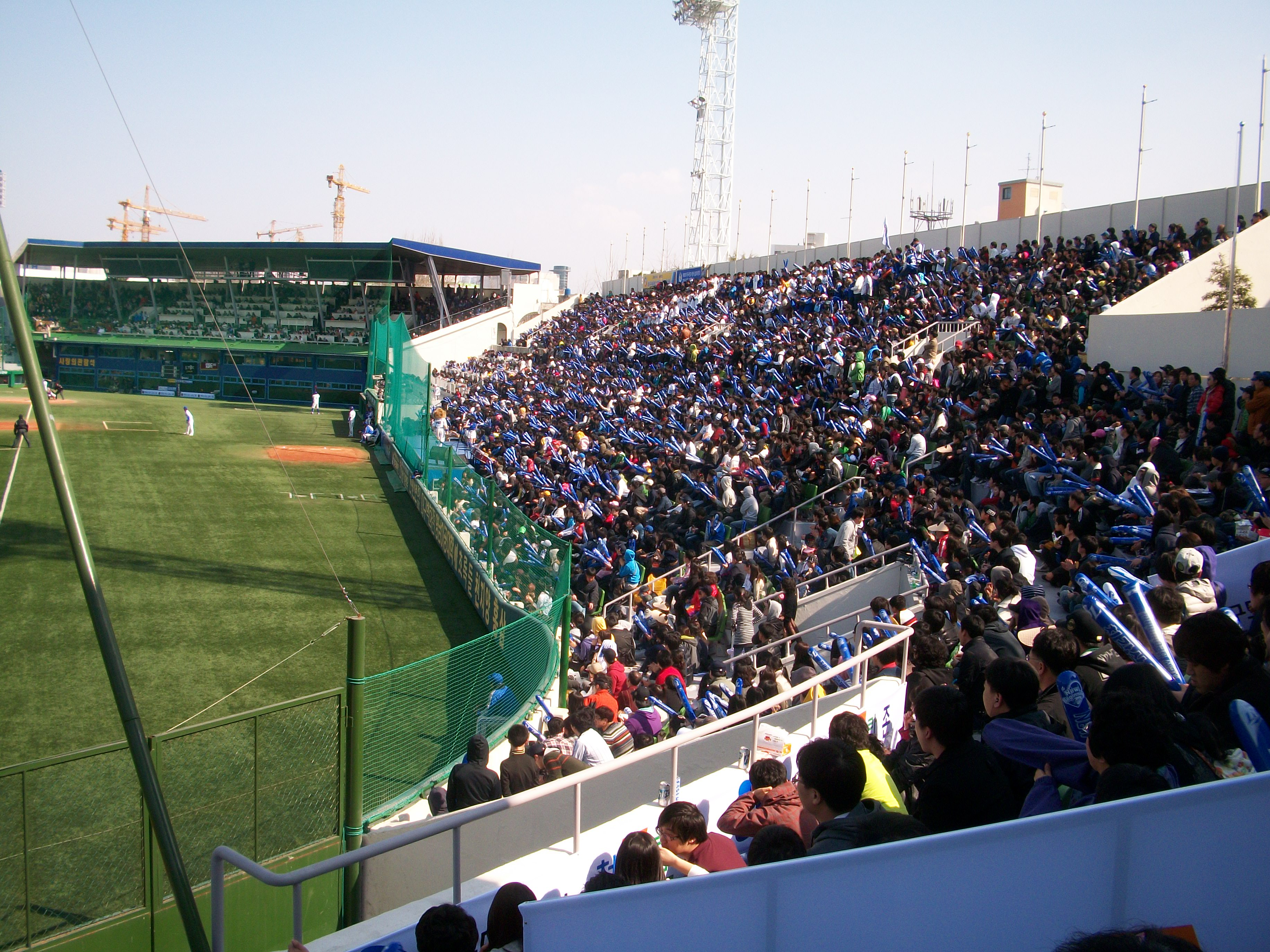
- Interactive map of Daegu Baseball Stadium
- Location: Daegu, South Korea
- Coordinates: 35.880975°N 128.586572°E
- Owner: City of Daegu
- Capacity: 5,000
- Surface: Natural grass (1948–1994); AstroTurf (1995–2006); FieldTurf (2007–present)
- Field size: Left Field – 99 metres (325 ft); Left-Center – 115 metres (377 ft); Center Field – 120 metres (394 ft); Right-Center – 115 metres (377 ft); Right Field – 99 metres (325 ft); Outfield Wall Height – 3 metres (10 ft)

Construction
- Opened: 20 April 1948
- Renovated: 1981

Tenants
- Samsung Lions (1982–2015); Daebung Flag National High School Baseball Championship (1979–present)

Daegu Baseball Stadium (Korean: 대구시민운동장 야구장) is a multi-use stadium in Daegu, South Korea. It is currently used mostly for baseball games and was the home stadium of Samsung Lions between 1982 and 2015. The stadium was built in 1948.
