= Doosan Bears =

South Korean baseball team in Seoul, South Korea

- 두산 베어스

Logo	Cap insignia

Information
- League: KBO League (1982–present)
- Location: Seoul
- Ballpark: Jamsil Olympic Stadium (2027–present)
- Established: 1982; 44 years ago
- Korean Series championships: 1982, 1995, 2001, 2015, 2016, 2019
- League championships: 1995, 2016, 2018, 2019
- Former name: OB Bears (1982–1998)
- Former ballparks: Daejeon Hanbat Baseball Stadium (1982–1984); Dongdaemun Baseball Stadium (1985); Jamsil Baseball Stadium (1985–2026)
- Colors: Navy blue, red, white
- Mascot: Cheolwoong
- Retired numbers: 21, 54
- Ownership: Doosan
- Manager: Kim Won-hyong
- Website: www.doosanbears.com

The Doosan Bears (Korean: 두산 베어스) are a South Korean professional baseball team based in Seoul. Founded in 1982, they are a member of the KBO League. The Bears have won six Korean Series titles (1982, 1995, 2001, 2015, 2016, and 2019) and play their home games at Jamsil Olympic Stadium.

== History ==
The club was founded in Daejeon in 1982 as the OB Bears, with the Oriental Brewery as their owners. OB Bears were the first team to be founded in the KBO League. The Doosan Group initially wanted a base in Seoul from 1982, as their company was founded in Seoul and had no connection to Chungcheong Province. But since there was no corporation that could establish a baseball team in Daejeon, Doosan agreed to play in Daejeon for three years before returning to Seoul.

In 1985, the team moved to their current home in Seoul. The OB Bears were officially renamed the Doosan Bears in 1999, after Oriental Brewery was sold to InBev and the Doosan Group assumed ownership.

The Bears won the inaugural Korean Series in 1982 by defeating the Samsung Lions to become the first KBO League champion. Between 2015 and 2021, the Bears appeared in seven consecutive Korean Series championships, winning three of the series in 2015, 2016 and 2019.

== Team colors ==
The main colors of the team are navy blue and white, with red as the secondary color. From 1999 to 2009, yellow was used instead as the secondary color, before the team returned in 2010 to the iconic dark blue and red combination of the original OB Bears.

== Mascot ==
The Doosan Bears mascot is a bear named Cheolwoong (철웅). Its biggest feature is that it embodies the bear, the symbolic animal of Doosan Bears, as a dynamic robot character. It emphasized strength and a future-oriented image.

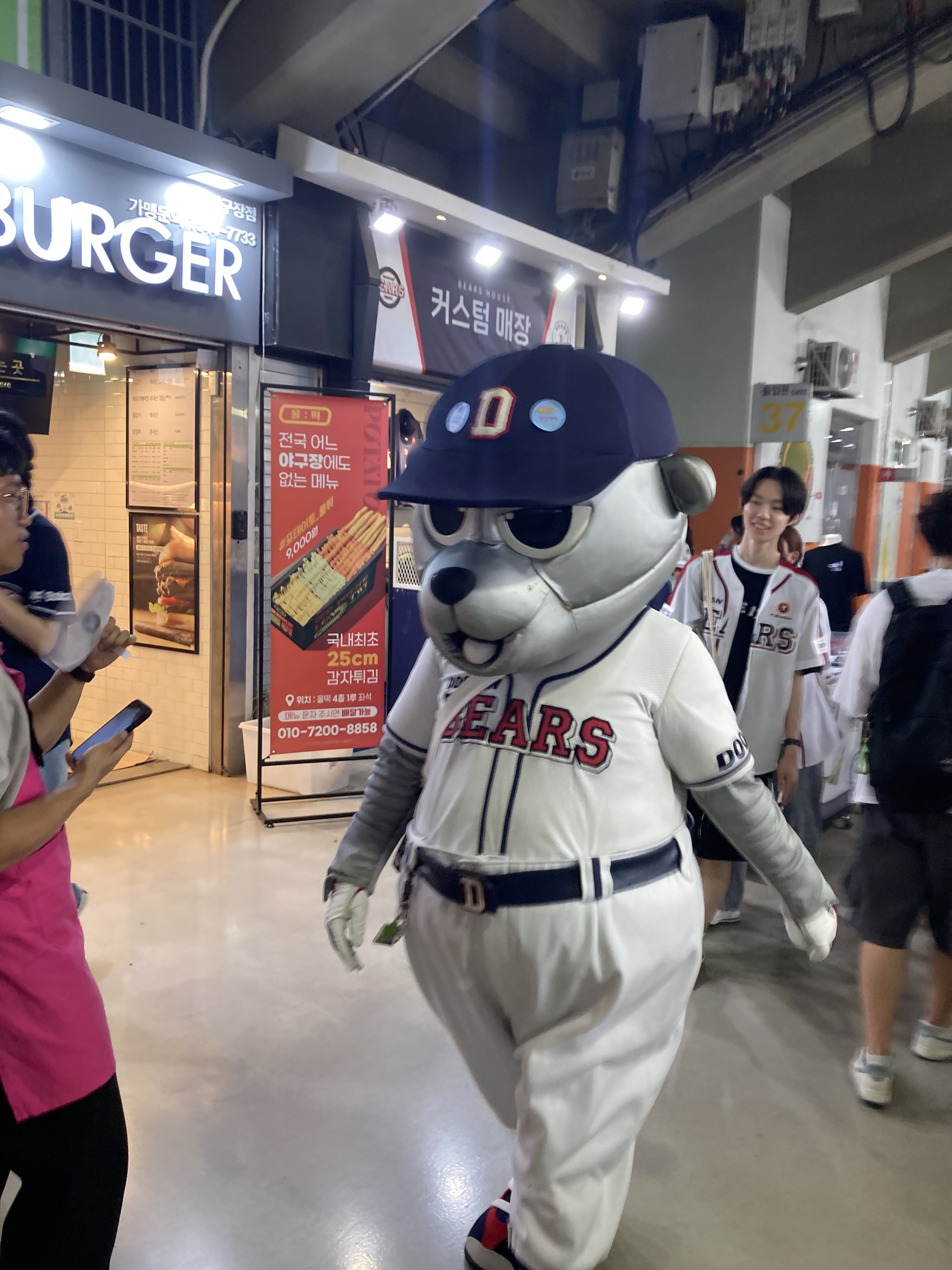
Cheolwoong, the Doosan Bears mascot

== Season-by-season records ==
Season	City	Stadium	League	Finish	Regular season									Postseason	Awards
Season	City	Stadium	League	Finish	Rank	Games	Wins	Losses	Draws	Win%	BA	HR	ERA	Postseason	Awards
OB Bears
1982	Daejeon	Daejeon Hanbat; Baseball Stadium	KBO	1	1/6	40	29	11	0	.725	.283	57	3.20	Won Korean Series vs. Samsung Lions (4–1–1)	Park Chul-soon (MVP)
1982	Daejeon	Daejeon Hanbat; Baseball Stadium	KBO	1	2/6	40	27	13	0	.675	.283	57	3.20	Won Korean Series vs. Samsung Lions (4–1–1)	Park Chul-soon (MVP)
1983	Daejeon	Daejeon Hanbat; Baseball Stadium	KBO	5	6/6	50	22	28	0	.440	.259	50	3.54	Did not qualify	Park Jong-hoon (ROTY)
1983	Daejeon	Daejeon Hanbat; Baseball Stadium	KBO	5	5/6	50	22	27	1	.449	.259	50	3.54	Did not qualify	Park Jong-hoon (ROTY)
1984	Daejeon	Daejeon Hanbat; Baseball Stadium	KBO	3	2/6	50	30	20	0	.600	.256	53	2.53	Did not qualify	Yun Seog-hwan (ROTY)
1984	Daejeon	Daejeon Hanbat; Baseball Stadium	KBO	3	2/6	50	28	21	1	.571	.256	53	2.53	Did not qualify	Yun Seog-hwan (ROTY)
1985	Seoul	Dongdaemun; Baseball Stadium	KBO	4	2/6	55	29	25	1	.537	.260	67	3.16	Did not qualify	
1985	Seoul	Dongdaemun; Baseball Stadium	KBO	4	5/6	55	22	32	1	.409	.260	67	3.16	Did not qualify	
1986	Seoul	Jamsil; Baseball Stadium	KBO	3	5/7	54	23	29	2	.442	.249	38	2.61	Lost playoff vs. Samsung Lions (2–3)	
1986	Seoul	Jamsil; Baseball Stadium	KBO	3	1/7	54	33	19	2	.635	.249	38	2.61	Lost playoff vs. Samsung Lions (2–3)	
1987	Seoul	Jamsil; Baseball Stadium	KBO	3	2/7	54	30	22	2	.574	.261	30	3.26	Lost playoff vs. Haitai Tigers (2–3)	
1987	Seoul	Jamsil; Baseball Stadium	KBO	3	5/7	54	24	30	0	.444	.261	30	3.26	Lost playoff vs. Haitai Tigers (2–3)	
1988	Seoul	Jamsil; Baseball Stadium	KBO	5	3/7	54	31	23	0	.574	.258	44	3.73	Did not qualify	
1988	Seoul	Jamsil; Baseball Stadium	KBO	5	5/7	54	23	29	2	.444	.258	44	3.73	Did not qualify	
1989	Seoul	Jamsil; Baseball Stadium	KBO	5	5/7	120	54	63	3	.463	.247	42	3.70	Did not qualify	
1990	Seoul	Jamsil; Baseball Stadium	KBO	7	7/7	120	35	80	5	.313	.231	62	4.72	Did not qualify	
1991	Seoul	Jamsil; Baseball Stadium	KBO	8	8/8	126	51	73	2	.413	.250	59	4.32	Did not qualify	
1992	Seoul	Jamsil; Baseball Stadium	KBO	5	5/8	126	56	66	4	.460	.259	110	4.22	Did not qualify	
1993	Seoul	Jamsil; Baseball Stadium	KBO	4	3/8	126	66	55	5	.544	.258	59	2.89	Lost semi-playoff vs. LG Twins (1–2)	
1994	Seoul	Jamsil; Baseball Stadium	KBO	7	7/8	126	53	72	1	.425	.246	75	3.46	Did not qualify	
1995	Seoul	Jamsil; Baseball Stadium	KBO	1	1/8	126	74	47	5	.607	.266	106	3.42	Won Korean Series vs. Lotte Giants (4–3)	Kim Sang-ho (MVP)
1996	Seoul	Jamsil; Baseball Stadium	KBO	8	8/8	126	47	73	6	.397	.242	82	3.67	Did not qualify	
1997	Seoul	Jamsil; Baseball Stadium	KBO	5	5/8	126	57	64	5	.472	.254	84	3.84	Did not qualify	
1998	Seoul	Jamsil; Baseball Stadium	KBO	4	4/8	126	61	62	3	.496	.256	102	3.60	Lost semi-playoff vs. LG Twins (0–2)	Tyrone Woods (MVP)
Doosan Bears
1999	Seoul	Jamsil; Baseball Stadium	Dream League	4	1/4	132	76	51	5	.598	.284	141	4.58	Lost playoff vs. Hanwha Eagles (0–4)	Hong Sung-heon (ROTY)
2000	Seoul	Jamsil; Baseball Stadium	Dream League	2	2/4	133	76	57	0	.571	.289	150	4.22	Won playoff vs. LG Twins (4–2); Lost Korean Series vs. Hyundai Unicorns (3–4)	
2001	Seoul	Jamsil; Baseball Stadium	KBO	1	3/8	133	65	63	5	.508	.276	130	4.96	Won semi-playoff vs. Hanwha Eagles (2–0); Won playoff vs. Hyundai Unicorns (3–1); Won Korean Series vs. Samsung Lions (4–2)	
2002	Seoul	Jamsil; Baseball Stadium	KBO	5	5/8	133	66	65	2	.504	.261	130	3.93	Did not qualify	
2003	Seoul	Jamsil; Baseball Stadium	KBO	7	7/8	133	57	74	2	.435	.276	90	4.25	Did not qualify	
2004	Seoul	Jamsil; Baseball Stadium	KBO	3	3/8	133	70	62	1	.530	.268	89	3.88	Won semi-playoff vs. Kia Tigers (2–0); Lost playoff vs. Samsung Lions (1–3)	
2005	Seoul	Jamsil; Baseball Stadium	KBO	2	2/8	126	72	51	3	.585	.270	63	3.42	Won playoff vs. Hanwha Eagles (3–0); Lost Korean Series vs. Samsung Lions (0–4)	
2006	Seoul	Jamsil; Baseball Stadium	KBO	5	5/8	126	63	60	3	.512	.258	55	3.36	Did not qualify	
2007	Seoul	Jamsil; Baseball Stadium	KBO	2	2/8	126	70	54	2	.565	.263	78	3.45	Won playoff vs. Hanwha Eagles (3–0); Lost Korean Series vs. SK Wyverns (2–4)	Danny Rios (MVP); Im Tae-hoon (ROTY)
2008	Seoul	Jamsil; Baseball Stadium	KBO	2	2/8	126	70	56	0	.556	.276	68	3.89	Won playoff vs. Samsung Lions (4–2); Lost Korean Series vs. SK Wyverns (1–4)	
2009	Seoul	Jamsil; Baseball Stadium	KBO	3	3/8	133	71	60	2	.534	.280	120	4.60	Won semi-playoff vs. Lotte Giants (3–1); Lost playoff vs. SK Wyverns (2–3)	Lee Yong-chan (ROTY)
2010	Seoul	Jamsil; Baseball Stadium	KBO	3	3/8	133	73	57	3	.562	.281	149	4.62	Won semi-playoff vs. Lotte Giants (3–2); Lost playoff vs. Samsung Lions (2–3)	Yang Eui-ji (ROTY)
2011	Seoul	Jamsil; Baseball Stadium	KBO	5	5/8	133	61	70	2	.466	.271	92	4.26	Did not qualify	
2012	Seoul	Jamsil; Baseball Stadium	KBO	3	3/8	133	68	62	3	.523	.260	59	3.58	Lost semi-playoff vs. Lotte Giants (1–3)	
2013	Seoul	Jamsil; Baseball Stadium	KBO	2	4/9	128	71	54	3	.568	.289	95	4.57	Won semi-playoff vs. Nexen Heroes (3–2); Won playoff vs. LG Twins (3–1); Lost Korean Series vs. Samsung Lions (3–4)	
2014	Seoul	Jamsil; Baseball Stadium	KBO	6	6/9	128	59	68	1	.465	.293	108	5.43	Did not qualify	
2015	Seoul	Jamsil; Baseball Stadium	KBO	1	3/10	144	79	65	0	.549	.290	140	5.02	Won semi-playoff vs. Nexen Heroes (3–1); Won playoff vs. NC Dinos (3–2); Won Korean Series vs. Samsung Lions (4–1)	
2016	Seoul	Jamsil; Baseball Stadium	KBO	1	1/10	144	93	50	1	.650	.298	183	4.45	Won Korean Series vs. NC Dinos (4–0)	Dustin Nippert (MVP)
2017	Seoul	Jamsil; Baseball Stadium	KBO	2	2/10	144	84	57	3	.596	.294	178	4.38	Won playoff vs. NC Dinos (3–1); Lost Korean Series vs. Kia Tigers (1–4)	
2018	Seoul	Jamsil; Baseball Stadium	KBO	2	1/10	144	93	51	0	.646	.309	191	4.98	Lost Korean Series vs. SK Wyverns (2–4)	Kim Jae-hwan (MVP)
2019	Seoul	Jamsil; Baseball Stadium	KBO	1	1/10	144	88	55	1	.615	.278	84	3.51	Won Korean Series vs. Kiwoom Heroes (4–0)	Josh Lindblom (MVP)
2020	Seoul	Jamsil; Baseball Stadium	KBO	2	3/10	144	79	61	4	.564	.293	125	4.31	Won semi-playoff vs. LG Twins (2–0); Won playoff vs. KT Wiz (3–1); Lost Korean Series vs. NC Dinos (2–4)	
2021	Seoul	Jamsil; Baseball Stadium	KBO	2	4/10	144	71	65	8	.522	.268	110	4.26	Won wild card vs. Kiwoom Heroes (1–1); Won semi-playoff vs. LG Twins (2–1); Won playoff vs. Samsung Lions (2–0); Lost Korean Series vs. KT Wiz (0–4)	Ariel Miranda (MVP)
2022	Seoul	Jamsil; Baseball Stadium	KBO	9	9/10	144	60	82	2	.423	.255	101	4.45	Did not qualify	Jeong Cheol-won (ROTY)
2023	Seoul	Jamsil; Baseball Stadium	KBO	5	5/10	144	74	68	2	.521	.255	100	3.92	Lost wild card vs. NC Dinos (0–1)	
2024	Seoul	Jamsil; Baseball Stadium	KBO	4	4/10	144	74	68	2	.521	.276	150	4.82	Lost wild card vs. KT Wiz (0–2)	Kim Taek-yeon (ROTY)
2025	Seoul	Jamsil; Baseball Stadium	KBO	9	9/10	144	61	77	6	.442	.262	102	4.30	Did not qualify	
2026	Seoul	Jamsil; Baseball Stadium	KBO	5	5/10	144	73	66	5	.525	.267	114	3.86	Lost wild card vs. LG Twins (0–1)	

== Team ==
=== Retired numbers ===
The Bears have retired numbers 21 and 54. The number 21 is retired in honour of pitcher Park Chul-soon, who won the KBO League Most Valuable Player Award, the Pitching Triple Crown, and the Korean Series Most Valuable Player Award in 1982. The number 54 is in memory of catcher Kim Young-shin, who committed suicide while still a young player.

=== Managers ===
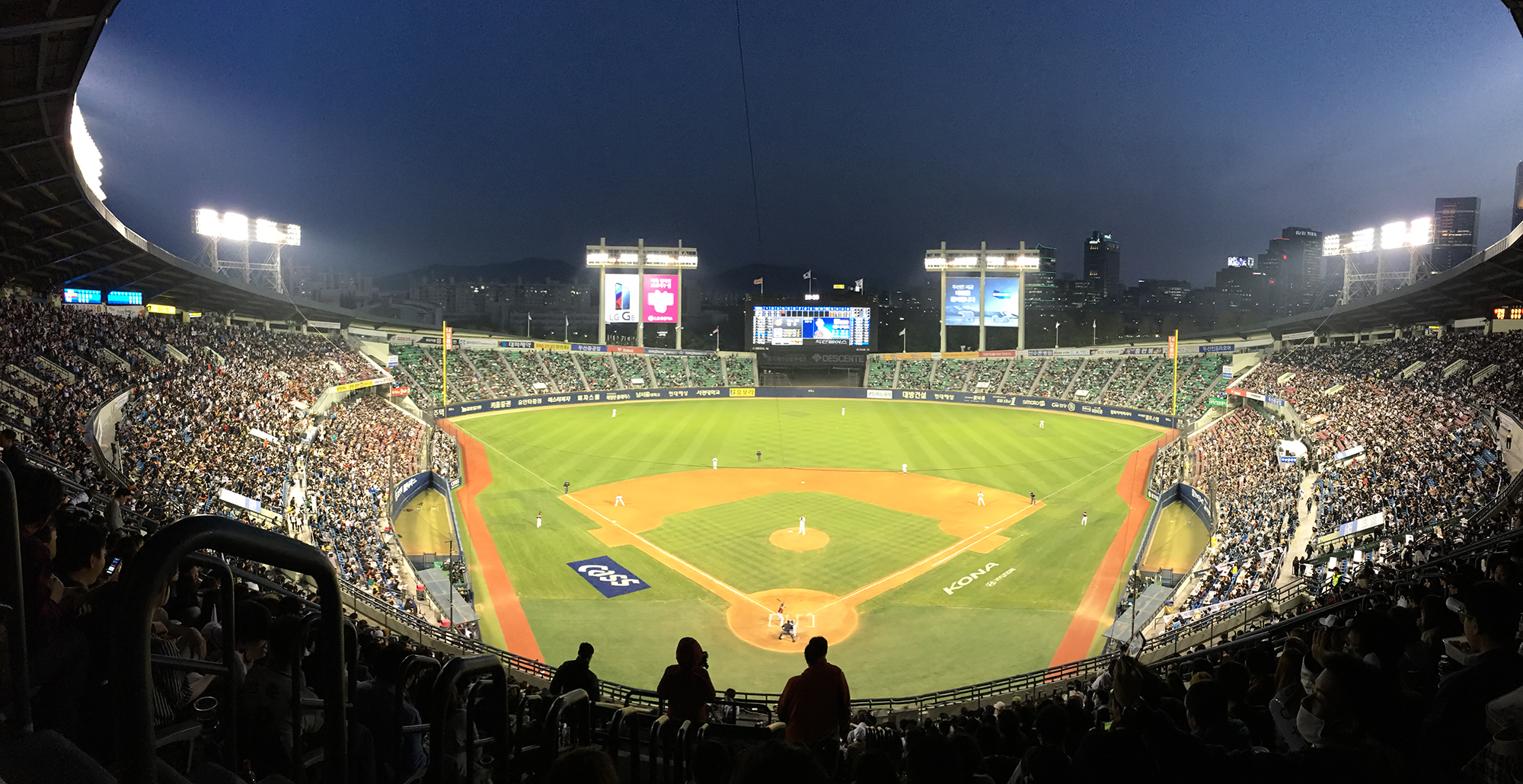
Jamsil Baseball Stadium, home field of the Doosan Bears between 1985 and 2026

Number	Name	Tenure	Honours
1	Kim Yeong-duk	15 January 1982 – 8 August 1982	1982 Korean Series
2	Kim Sung-keun	24 December 1983 – 8 September 1988	
3	Lee Kwang-hwan	9 September 1988 – 19 June 1990	
4	Lee Jae-won	19 June 1990 – 11 July 1991	
5	Yun Dong-kyun	9 September 1991 – 1994	
6	Kim Yin-sik	21 September 1994 – 2003	1995 Korean Series; 2001 Korean Series
7	Kim Kyung-moon	10 October 2003 – 13 June 2011	
Acting	Kim Kwang-soo	13 June 2011 – 9 October 2011	
8	Kim Jin-wook	9 October 2011 – 27 November 2013	
9	Song Il-soo	27 November 2013 – 21 October 2014	
10	Kim Tae-hyoung	21 October 2014 – 11 October 2022	2015 Korean Series; 2016 Korean Series; 2019 Korean Series
11	Lee Seung-yuop	14 October 2022 – 2 June 2025	
Acting	Cho Sung-hwan	3 June 2025 – 19 October 2025	
12	Kim Won-hyong	20 October 2025 – present	
