= Yoon Myung-june =

South Korean baseball player

- Relief pitcher
- Born: June 8, 1989 (age 36)
- Batted: Right Threw: Right

KBO debut
- May 12, 2012, for the Doosan Bears

Last KBO appearance
- October 2, 2023, for the Lotte Giants

KBO statistics
- Win–loss record: 28–14
- Earned run average: 4.52
- Strikeouts: 289
- Stats at Baseball Reference

Teams
- Doosan Bears (2012–2016, 2019–2022); Lotte Giants (2023); Sangmu Baseball Team (2017–2018)

- Yoon Myung-june
- Hangul: 윤명준
- Hanja: 尹明準
- RR: Yun Myeongjun
- MR: Yun Myŏngjun

Yoon Myung-june (Korean: 윤명준; born June 18, 1989) is a South Korean former pitcher for the Doosan Bears of the KBO League. He bats and throws right-handed. Yoon was selected sixth overall by the Doosan Bears in the 2012 KBO Draft.

== Amateur career ==
As a sophomore at Korea University in 2009 Yoon was promoted to the team's starting rotation. Yoon hurled one-run baseball over 7.1 innings and fanned 10 batters against reigning national champion Kyungsung University in his first 2009 season game as a starter. However, Yoon was sidelined with injuries for 3 months and finished the season with a 2.36 ERA and 45 strikeouts in 34.1 innings pitched.

Yoon broke out in 2010 when he racked up 6 wins as a starter and posted a 0.85 ERA in 52.2 innings pitched. He led the national collegiate league in ERA, and was sixth in strikeouts (67) and seventh in wins. During the season, Yoon was selected for the South Korean national collegiate team and participated in the friendly baseball championship against the United States national baseball team and the 2010 World University Baseball Championship.

As a senior in 2011, Yoon had another strong collegiate season, posting a 6–2 record and an ERA of 1.38 and fanning 66 strikeouts. At the President's Flag Championship, Yoon led his team to the championship tossing a complete game shutout in the final game, and eventually earned the MVP honors. In September 2011, Yoon was called up to the South Korean senior national team for the 2011 Baseball World Cup held in Panama.

=== Notable international careers ===
Year	Venue	Competition	Team	Individual note
2010	United States	South Korea vs USA Baseball Championship	0W-5L	0–1; 6.75 ERA (4 G, 6.2 IP, 5 ER, 9 K)
2010	Japan	World University Baseball Championship	4th	0–1; 7.56 ERA (3 G, 8.1 IP, 7 ER, 3 K)
2011	Panama	Baseball World Cup	6th	0–0; 2.25 ERA (4 G, 8.0 IP, 2 ER, 5 K)
