= Back Sang-won =

South Korean baseball player

Back Sang-Won
- Second baseman / Shortstop
- Born: January 2, 1988 (age 38)
- Batted: Left Threw: Right

KBO debut
- April 27, 2013, for the Samsung Lions

Last appearance
- September 8, 2018, for the Samsung Lions

KBO statistics
- Batting average: .270
- Home runs: 3
- Runs batted in: 63
- Stats at Baseball Reference

Teams
- Samsung Lions (2013–2018)

- Back Sang-won
- Hangul: 백상원
- Hanja: 白相元
- RR: Baek Sangwon
- MR: Paek Sangwŏn

Back Sang-Won (Korean: 백상원; born January 2, 1988, in Daegu) is a South Korean former infielder, who played 6 seasons for the Samsung Lions in the Korea Baseball Organization. He bats left-handed and throws right-handed.

== Amateur career ==
Back was first called up to the South Korean collegiate national team as a junior at Dankook University in 2008 when he batted .403 in the national collegiate league. With South Korea, he competed in the IBAF World University Baseball Championship held in Czech Republic. Back batted .286 and drove in 3 runs and stole 2 bases, playing as a starting second baseman. He went 2-for-3, including a RBI double, off "Handkerchief Prince" Yuki Saito in the team's semifinal against Japan.

As a senior in 2009, Back was selected for the South Korean national team again and participated in the Asian Baseball Championship held in Sapporo, Japan.

=== Notable international careers ===
| Year | Venue | Competition | Team | Individual note |
|---|---|---|---|---|
| 2008 | Czech Republic | World University Baseball Championship | 4th | .286 BA (8-for-28), 3 RBI, 5 R, 1 SB |
| 2009 | Japan | Asian Baseball Championship | Bronze medal | .333 BA (1-for-3), 1 R |

== Professional career ==
After graduation from Dankook University, Back was drafted in the 2010 KBO Entry Draft by the Samsung Lions as the 4th pick of the 4th round, 28th overall. In the 2010 Futures League, Back was ranked first in batting average with .306, playing in 106 games. However, Back spent his entire 2010 season in the Lions' second-tier team.

After the 2010 season, Back joined the Korea Armed Forces Athletic Corps Baseball Team to serve a two-year military duty. In October 2011, Back competed in the 2011 Baseball World Cup as a member of the South Korean national baseball team. In the tourney, he shared second base duties with Choi Joo-Hwan but struggled at the plate, batting just .154. The Lions released Sang-won on October 19, 2018.

=== Notable international careers ===
| Year | Venue | Competition | Team | Individual Note |
|---|---|---|---|---|
| 2011 | Panama | Baseball World Cup | 6th | .154 BA (4-for-26), 2 RBI, 4 R |
