= Park Hae-min =

South Korean baseball player (born 1990)

LG Twins – No. 17
- Center fielder
- Born: February 24, 1990 (age 36); Seoul, South Korea
- Bats: Left Throws: Right

KBO debut
- September 13, 2013, for the Samsung Lions

KBO statistics (through 2025 season)
- Batting average: .284
- Home runs: 60
- Runs batted in: 621
- Stolen bases: 460
- Stats at Baseball Reference

Teams
- Samsung Lions (2013–2021); LG Twins (2022–present)

Career highlights and awards
- KBO: 3× Korean Series champion (2014, 2023, 2025); 5× KBO stolen base leader (2015–2018, 2025); 3× KBO Defensive Award (2023, 2025–2026); KBO Golden Glove Award – Photo (2025)
Medals
Men's baseball
Representing South Korea
Asian Games
Gold medal – first place	2018 Jakarta-Palembang	Team

Park Hae-min (Korean: 박해민, born February 24, 1990) is a South Korean center fielder for the LG Twins of the KBO League. He bats left-handed and throws right-handed.

== Amateur career ==
Upon graduation from Shinil High School in Seoul, Park was eligible for the 2008 KBO Draft but went undrafted. Instead, he entered Hanyang University to continue to play baseball.

Park had mediocre freshman and sophomore seasons, but finally showed signs of promise in his junior year in 2010, when he led the team attack alongside Ko Jong-wook, posting a .299 batting average.

In 2011, Park was moved to the lead-off role right after the team's four-year lead-off hitter Ko Jong-wook graduated. In July 2011, Park won the batting title with a .452 batting average at the 2011 National Summer League Championship, going 14-for-31 as the team's lead-off hitter. Park finished his last collegiate season with a career-best .429 batting average (which was ranked first in the 2011 national collegiate season), 11 RBIs, and 7 stolen bases.

== Professional career ==
=== 2012 KBO Draft ===
When Park, the 2011 college batting champion, made himself eligible for the KBO draft after his senior season at Hanyang University, many expected him to be an early-round pick. However, some scouting reports highlighted his lack of prototypical height and inability to hit home runs and questioned his defensive abilities, and Park was not called in the 2012 KBO Draft. A week later, he signed with the Samsung Lions as an undrafted free agent.

=== Samsung Lions ===
In 2012, Park played his professional rookie season with the Lions' farm-league affiliate. In the 2012 KBO Futures League for the reserve teams, he batted .254 with 20 RBIs and 3 stolen bases. Park made his first KBO League appearance on September 13, 2013, as a pinch runner for Choi Hyoung-woo, who had singled, but did not score.

In 2014 Park had a breakout season, making 119 appearances as a starting center fielder for the Lions, and batting .297 with 31 RBIs and 36 stolen bases. He was ranked fifth overall in stolen bases and third in the 2014 KBO Rookie of the Year Award.

=== LG Twins ===
Park obtained FA status after the 2021 season and transferred to the LG Twins on December 14, 2021, signing an FA contract worth a total of 6 billion won, including a 4-year contract, a signing bonus of 3.2 billion won, an annual salary of 600 million won, and incentives of 400 million won.

In 2023, as his team LG won the integrated championship for the first time in 29 years since 1994, he earned his second championship ring since his debut. He was also selected as the Game 5 MVP for his outstanding performance in both offense and defense during Game 5 of the Korean Series.

He obtained FA status after the 2025 season and remained with the team on a 4-year contract worth a total of 6.5 billion won.

== International career ==
In September 2011, Park was called up to the South Korea national baseball team for the 2011 Baseball World Cup held in Panama. Park went 3-for-4 in the Team Korea's first game against Venezuela. He hit a game-tying three-run homer off Darío Veras in the ninth inning of the Team Korea's last Round 1 game against Dominican Republic, which ended with a Korea's 5–4 victory.

In 2018, he represented South Korea at the 2018 Asian Games.

Year	Venue	Competition	Team	Individual Note
2011	Panama	Baseball World Cup	6th	.306 BA (11-for-36), 6 RBI, 1 HR, 3 R, 1 SB
