= Ko Jong-wook =

South Korean baseball player (born 1989)

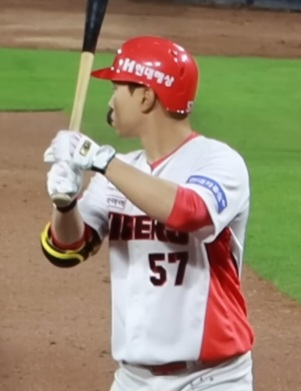

Kia Tigers – No. 57
- Outfielder
- Born: January 11, 1989 (age 37)
- Bats: Left Throws: Right

KBO debut
- 2011, for the Nexen Heroes

KBO statistics (through 2025)
- Batting average: .302
- Home runs: 50
- Runs batted in: 413
- Stats at Baseball Reference

Teams
- Nexen Heroes (2011, 2014–2018); SK Wyverns / SSG Landers (2019–2021); Kia Tigers (2022–present)

Ko Jong-wook (Korean: 고종욱; born January 11, 1989, in Seoul) is a South Korean outfielder for the Kia Tigers in the Korea Baseball Organization. He bats left-handed and throws right-handed.

== Amateur career ==
Ko attended Kyunggi High School in Seoul. After graduation, he went undrafted in the 2007 KBO Draft and began his collegiate career at Hanyang University.

As a freshman at Hanyang University in 2007, Ko was handed the leadoff spot in the team's line-up, leading the team in hitting with a .298 batting average and helping Hanyang University to win its first national championship since 2001, at the Fall League of the National Collegiate Championship.

In 2008, Ko batted .337 and stole 12 bases, playing in 21 games as a starting center fielder and leadoff hitter.

In 2009, Ko batted .377 with 9 stolen bases in 22 games. After the 2009 collegiate season, he was first called up to the South Korean senior national team. With South Korea, he competed in the IBAF Baseball World Cup. Ko batted .237, drove in 5 runs and stole 2 bases, playing in all 10 games as a starting right fielder.

In 2010, Ko batted a career-high .438, ranked first in the 2010 collegiate league, and stole 12 bases with 1.000 stolen base percentage. As a member of the South Korean collegiate national team, Ko participated in the friendly baseball championship against the United States collegiate national baseball team and the World University Baseball Championship held in Japan.

=== Notable international careers ===
Year	Venue	Competition	Team	Individual note
2009	Europe	Baseball World Cup	9th	.237 BA (9-for-38), 4 RBI, 2 SB
2010	United States	South Korea vs USA Baseball Championship	0W-5L	.000 BA (0-for-15)
2010	Japan	World University Baseball Championship	4th	.318 BA (7-for-22), 0 RBI, 3 SB

== Professional career ==
Ko was drafted in the 2011 KBO Entry Draft by the Nexen Heroes as the 3rd pick of the 3rd round, 19th overall. Ko started his rookie year with the expectation that he would earn the lead-off spot in the Heroes' batting order. However, he struggled at the plate, hitting just .179 and having no stolen bases in the first two weeks of the 2011 season. He was demoted to the minors after going 1-for-3 against the SK Wyverns on April 15. Ko was promoted to the first team again on August 7 and finished the season with a .248 batting average and one home run. Ko hit four triples of his 26 total hits during the season, ranked seventh in triples in the league.

From 2012 to 2013, Ko joined the Sangmu Baseball Team to serve two years of military duty. In 2014, Ko returned to the Heroes but was sidelined for the regular season after undergoing surgery for chronic shoulder dislocation.

On December 7, 2018, he moved through a triangular trade with Kim Dong-yup, then a member of the SK Wyverns, and Lee Ji-young, a member of the Samsung Lions.

Even after going to SK in the 19th season, the style of play itself has remained the same. However, in SK, which is saturated with outfield, there are fewer troubles due to defense, and big ball baseball collapsed due to the replacement of the official ball, and Ko Jong-wook himself increased his value on his own even though there was no significant change. While the record of distance hitters has fallen a lot due to the replacement of the official ball, Ko Jong-wook fell relatively less, so wRC+ hit a career high.

Throughout his career, he showed weaknesses in left-handed pitchers, especially in 20 years, when he was sluggish after 18 years, he showed an OPS of more than 0.7 against right-handed pitchers, while his left-handed opponent OPS has never exceeded 0.6 since 18.

Instead, it has recently been highlighted that he is showing a strong start against right-handed sidearm, so he is using it as a pinch hitter against sidearm. Even when he was in the SSG, he showed signs of survival when he met a sidearm pitcher, and KIA tried to reinforce outfielder and pinch hitter agents by bringing in Ko Jong-wook.

In the 22nd season, he usually plays as a pinch hitter, but has been alternately used as a platoon with Lee Chang-jin since the second half, showing his strong performance. In July, Lee Chang-jin, who boasted a great batting sense, began to lose his pace rapidly, when he joined the lineup instead. The contact ability, which was an advantage, is steadily hitting multi-hits as it shines, and it shows a high success rate even when it comes out as a pinch hitter, playing a role as a licorice for the Kia lineup.

=== Notable international careers ===
Year	Venue	Competition	Team	Individual Note
2011	Panama	Baseball World Cup	6th	.200 BA (9-for-45), 2 RBI, 4 R
