= Park Shin-zi =

South Korean baseball player (born 1999)

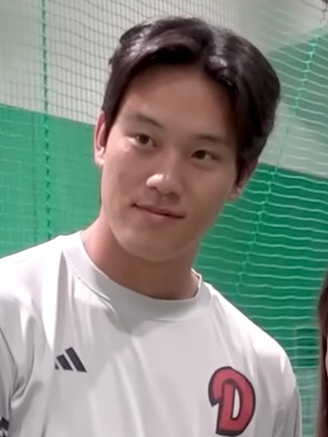
- Park in 2025

Doosan Bears – No. 49
- Pitcher
- Born: July 16, 1999 (age 27); Gimpo, South Korea
- Bats: Right Throws: Right

KBO debut
- April 22, 2018, for the Doosan Bears

KBO statistics (through 2025 season)
- Win–loss record: 4-13
- Earned run average: 4.89
- Strikeouts: 111
- Stats at Baseball Reference

Teams
- Doosan Bears (2018–present); Sangmu Phoenix (army) (2020–2021)

Park Shin-zi (Hangul: 박신지; born July 16, 1999) is a South Korean professional baseball pitcher who is currently playing for the Doosan Bears of the KBO League. He graduated from Kyunggi High School and was selected by the Bears in a 2018 draft (2nd draft, 1st round).
