= Athletics at the 2019 Summer Universiade – Men's half marathon =

The men's half marathon event at the 2019 Summer Universiade was held on 13 July in Naples.

== Results ==
=== Individual ===
Official Video

Rank	Name	Nationality	Time	Notes
1st place, gold medalist(s)	Akira Aizawa	Japan	1:05:15	
2nd place, silver medalist(s)	Taisei Nakamura	Japan	1:05:27	
3rd place, bronze medalist(s)	Tatsuhiko Ito	Japan	1:05:48	
4	Edward Goddard	Australia	1:06:20	
5	Iliass Aouani	Italy	1:06:52	SB
6	Shokhrukh Davlatov	Uzbekistan	1:07:06	
7	Saffet Elkatmiş	Turkey	1:07:07	
8	Alessandro Giacobazzi	Italy	1:07:56	
9	Ferhat Bozkurt	Turkey	1:08:37	
10	Lee Dong-jin	South Korea	1:08:54	
11	Ersin Tekal	Turkey	1:09:03	
12	Park Min-ho	South Korea	1:09:14	
13	Jacob Simonsen	Denmark	1:09:17	
14	Mokofane Kekana	South Africa	1:09:23	
15	Wong Wan Chun	Hong Kong	1:09:42	
16	Wang Hao	China	1:09:51	YC R240.8(h)
17	Frederik Ernst	Denmark	1:10:05	
18	Abdesl Meguellati Elokki	Algeria	1:10:21	
19	Krilan Le Bihan	France	1:10:28	
20	Bryce Anderson	Australia	1:10:41	
21	Gonzalo Parra	Mexico	1:11:04	
22	Anthony Timoteus	South Africa	1:11:06	
23	Martin Olesen	Denmark	1:11:07	
24	Thamsanqa Khonco	South Africa	1:12:57	
25	Dani Reyes	Mexico	1:13:04	
26	Park Jung-woo	South Korea	1:13:24	
27	Kushmesh Kumar	India	1:14:38	
28	Maxim Răileanu	Moldova	1:15:05	
29	Timothy Ongom	Uganda	1:18:03	
30	Brian Wangwe	Uganda	1:20:20	
31	Aqeel Al-Ammari	Saudi Arabia	1:23:34	
32	Mohammed Madkhli	Saudi Arabia	1:25:25	
	Lachlan Cook	Australia	DNF	
	Bandar Hassan	Saudi Arabia	DNF	
	Duo Bujie	China	DQ	R240.8(h), R144.4(f)
	Peng Jianhua	China	DQ	R240.8(h)
	Moses Longwe	Malawi	DNS	
	Edwin Mpozza	Uganda	DNS	

=== Team ===
Rank	Team	Time	Notes
1st place, gold medalist(s)	Japan; Akira Aizawa; Taisei Nakamura; Tatsuhiko Ito	3:16:30	
2nd place, silver medalist(s)	Turkey; Saffet Elkatmiş; Ferhat Bozkurt; Ersin Tekal	3:24:47	
3rd place, bronze medalist(s)	Denmark; Jacob Simonsen; Frederik Ernst; Martin Olesen	3:30:29	
4	South Korea; Lee Dong-jin; Park Min-ho; Park Jung-woo	3:31:32	
5	South Africa; Mokofane Kekana; Anthony Timoteus; Thamsanqa Khonco	3:33:26	
