= Sangmu Phoenix (disambiguation) =

Sangmu Phoenix may refer to:

- Gimcheon Sangmu FC
- Sangmu Phoenix (baseball)
