= Tatsuhiko Ito =

Japanese athlete (born 1998)

Personal information
- Born: 23 March 1998 (age 28) Hamamatsu, Japan
- Height: 1.70 m (5 ft 7 in)
- Weight: 52 kg (115 lb)

Sport
- Sport: Athletics
- Events: 5000 metres; 10000 metres; Half marathon
- University team: Tokyo International University
Medal record
Men's athletics
Representing Japan
Universiade
Bronze medal – third place	2019 Napoles	Half marathon

Tatsuhiko Ito (伊藤達彦, Itō Tatsuhiko, born 23 March 1998) is a Japanese long-distance runner.

On 4 December 2020, he finished second to Akira Aizawa in the 10,000m race at the Japanese national championships in a time of 27:25.73 at the Nagai Stadium, Osaka. In doing so, he broke the old Japanese national record along with Akira Aizawa and ran the Olympic qualifying standard time to secure a place at his home 2020 Tokyo Olympics.

== Personal bests ==
Outdoor

- 5000 metres – 13:33.97 (Chitose 2020)
- 10000 metres – 27:25.73 (Osaka 2020)
- 10 miles – 46:31 (Karatsu 2019)
- Half marathon – 1:01:52 (Tachikawa 2019)
