= Matt Barnes (baseball) =

American baseball player (born 1990)

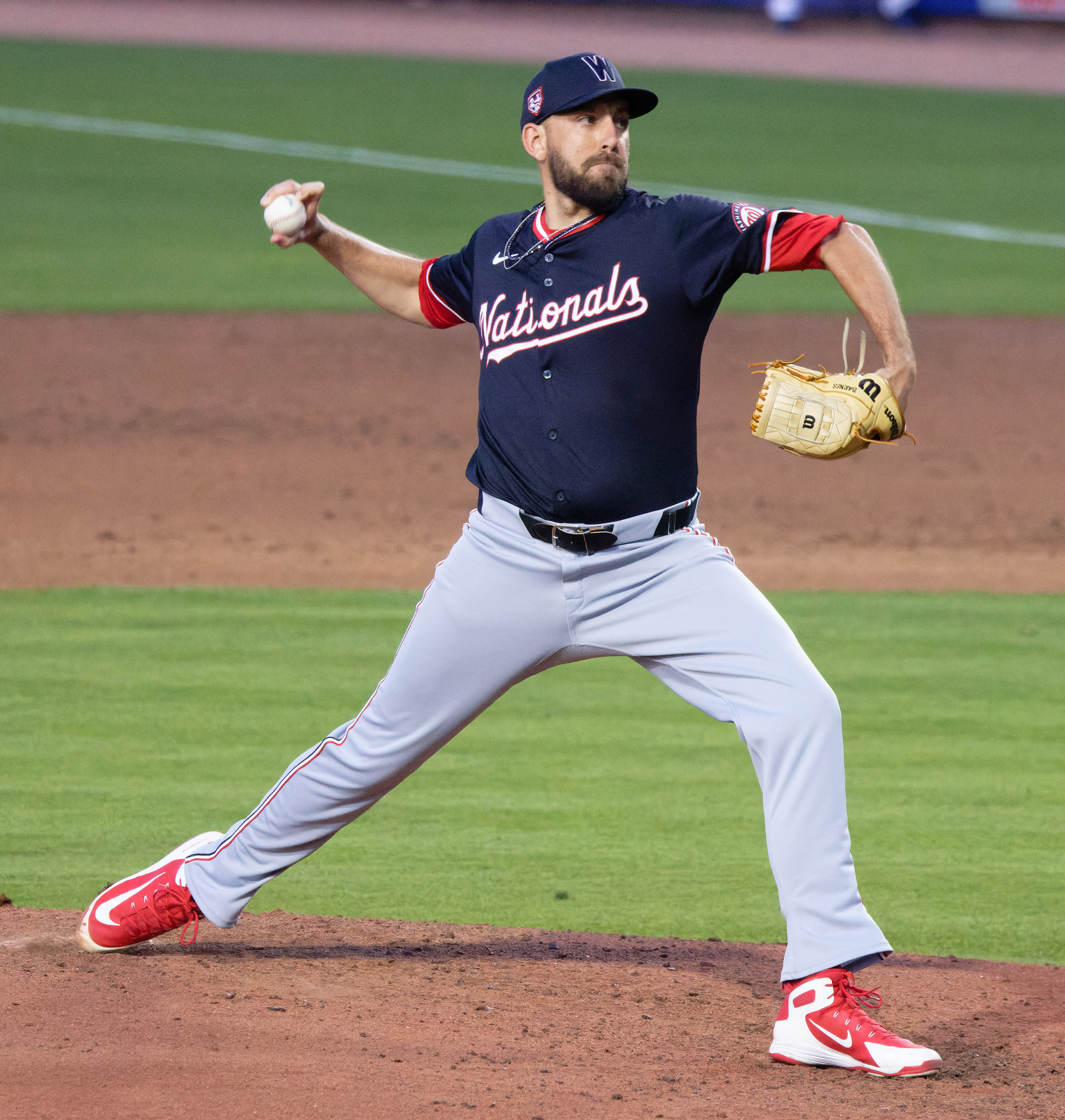
- Barnes with the Washington Nationals in 2024
- Pitcher
- Born: June 17, 1990 (age 36); Bethel, Connecticut, U.S.
- Batted: Right Threw: Right

MLB debut
- September 9, 2014, for the Boston Red Sox

Last MLB appearance
- May 2, 2024, for the Washington Nationals

MLB statistics
- Win–loss record: 33–30
- Earned run average: 4.21
- Strikeouts: 586
- Saves: 47
- Stats at Baseball Reference

Teams
- Boston Red Sox (2014–2022); Miami Marlins (2023); Washington Nationals (2024)

Career highlights and awards
- All-Star (2021); World Series champion (2018)
Medals
Men's baseball
Representing United States
World University Baseball Championship
Silver medal – second place	2010 Tokyo	Team

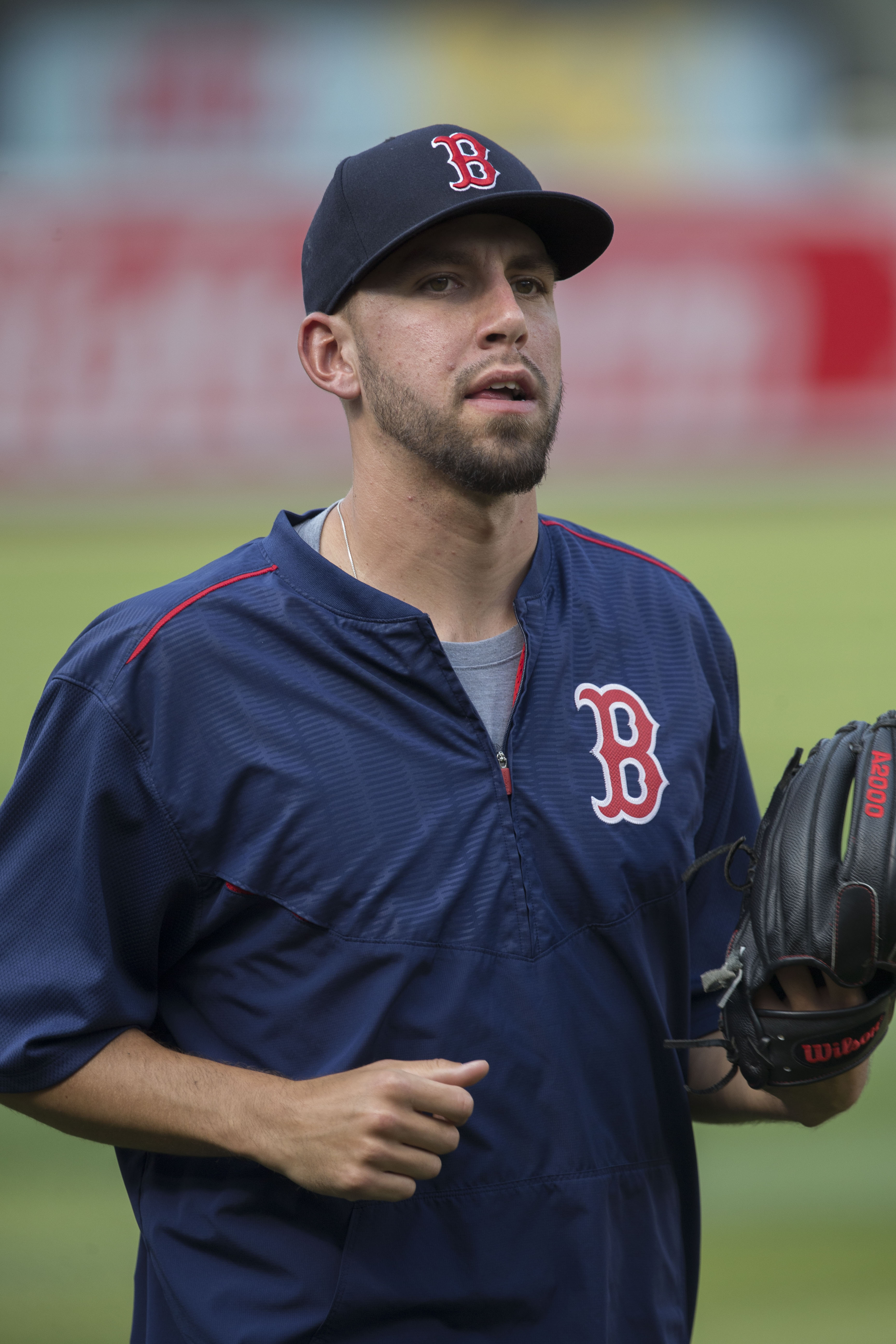
Barnes with the Red Sox in 2015

Matthew David Barnes (born June 17, 1990) is an American former professional baseball pitcher. He played in Major League Baseball (MLB) for the Boston Red Sox, Miami Marlins, and Washington Nationals. Listed at 6 feet 4 inches (1.93 m) and 210 pounds (95 kg), he bats and throws right-handed.

Barnes throws a high-90s four-seam fastball, a curveball, and a changeup. Prior to being drafted by the Red Sox in the first round of the 2011 Major League Baseball draft, he played college baseball at University of Connecticut, where he was named a First Team All-American.

== Early years ==
Barnes went to Bethel High School in Bethel, Connecticut. In high school, he was named to the All-State team. He was also a member of the basketball team. Following his high school career, he was not chosen in the Major League Baseball (MLB) draft. He then enrolled at the University of Connecticut, where he pursued a degree in political science.

== Amateur career ==
Barnes played college baseball for the Connecticut Huskies baseball team in the Big East Conference of the National Collegiate Athletic Association's (NCAA) Division I. As a freshman, he had a 5–3 win–loss record with a 5.43 earned run average (ERA) and 55 strikeouts in 53 innings pitched. As a sophomore, Barnes had an 8–3 record with a 3.92 ERA and 75 strikeouts. In his junior season, Barnes had an 11–3 win–loss record and an 1.11 ERA with 97 strikeouts in fourteen games started during the regular season, as the Huskies won their first conference regular season title.

Barnes was twice named to the All-Big East team. Barnes was named Big East Pitcher of the Year in 2011. He was also named to the 2011 College Baseball All-America Teams of the American Baseball Coaches Association and Collegiate Baseball. He was added to the Golden Spikes Award preseason watch list in 2011.

In 2009 and 2010, Barnes played collegiate summer baseball for the Wareham Gatemen of the Cape Cod Baseball League. He also pitched for the United States national baseball team in the 2010 World University Baseball Championship, not allowing an earned run, as the United States won the silver medal.

== Professional career ==
=== Boston Red Sox ===
==== Draft and minor leagues (2011–2014) ====
The Boston Red Sox selected Barnes with the 19th overall selection in the 2011 MLB draft. During the 2012 season, Barnes appeared in five games for the Single–A Greenville Drive and 20 games for the High–A Salem Red Sox—all starts—posting an overall record of 7–5 with a 2.86 ERA and 133 strikeouts in 119 2/3 innings pitched. He was selected to appear in the 2012 All-Star Futures Game.

Entering 2013, Barnes was ranked 38th in the MLB.com Top 100 Prospects list. During the season he played for the Double-A Portland Sea Dogs and Triple-A Pawtucket Red Sox. In a total of 25 games (all starts) he had a 6–10 record with a 4.13 ERA and 142 strikeouts in 113 1/3 innings pitched.

Barnes spent most of the 2014 season with Triple-A Pawtucket, where he appeared in 23 games (22 starts) compiling an 8–9 record with a 3.95 ERA and 103 strikeouts in 127 2/3 innings pitched.

==== 2014–2018 ====
The Red Sox promoted Barnes to the major leagues for the first time on September 8. He made his MLB debut the next day, pitching three scoreless innings of relief in a 4–1 Boston loss to the Baltimore Orioles. He finished the rest of the season with Boston, making a total of five MLB appearances (all in relief) while giving up four runs in nine innings pitched (4.00 ERA).

Barnes split time in 2015 between Pawtucket and Boston. In Triple-A, he compiled a 1–1 record with a 4.06 ERA in 17 games (five starts) with 41 strikeouts in 37 2/3 innings pitched. He made a total of 32 MLB appearances (two starts), pitching 43 innings while recording 39 strikeouts with a 5.44 ERA and a 3–4 record. Barnes spent all of the 2016 season with Boston, appearing in 62 games (all in relief) with 4.05 ERA and 71 strikeouts in 66 2/3 innings pitched. Along with a 4–3 record, he had his first save, which came on August 9 when he recorded the final out of a 5–3 win over the New York Yankees by striking out Mark Teixeira. During the 2016 ALDS, Barnes made his postseason debut, pitching 1 2/3 innings in Game 2 against the Cleveland Indians; he gave up three hits and one unearned run.

Early in the 2017 season, Barnes was ejected for the first time in his MLB career, on April 23 by umpire Andy Fletcher, for apparently trying to hit Baltimore's Manny Machado with a pitch in response to a hard slide by Machado on Dustin Pedroia in a game two days prior. The next day, Barnes received a four-game suspension for "intentionally throwing a pitch in the area of the head of Manny Machado." For the 2017 season, Barnes made 70 relief appearances with Boston, compiling a 7–3 record, plus one save, with a 3.88 ERA and 83 strikeouts in 69 2/3 innings pitched. Barnes started the 2018 season in his usual role as a member of Boston's bullpen. During the regular season, he appeared in 62 games, compiling a 6–4 record with a 3.65 ERA and 96 strikeouts in 61 2/3 innings. In the postseason, he made 10 appearances while allowing one earned run in 8 2/3 innings as the Red Sox went on to win the World Series over the Los Angeles Dodgers.

==== 2019–2022 ====
Barnes was included on Boston's Opening Day roster to start the 2019 season. He appeared in 70 games, recording a 5–4 record with four saves, a 3.78 ERA, and 110 strikeouts in 64 1/3 innings. During the start-delayed 2020 season, Barnes was the team's de facto closer after Brandon Workman was traded. Overall with the 2020 Red Sox, Barnes appeared in 24 games, all in relief, compiling a 1–3 record with 9 saves, 4.70 ERA, and 31 strikeouts in 23 innings pitched.

In early December 2020, Barnes and the Red Sox reached a one-year deal for the 2021 season, worth a reported $4.5 million. In late March 2021, Barnes tested positive for COVID-19, although it was subsequently announced that the result was a false positive. Barnes began the season as the team's closer, recording six saves in the first month of the season and being named the American League Reliever of the Month for April. On July 4, he was named to the American League roster for the MLB All-Star Game. On July 11, the Red Sox reached an agreement with Barnes on a two-year contract extension, including a team option for the 2024 season. Barnes was on the COVID-related injured list for one day in early August. He later tested positive at the end of the month, and did not return to the team until September 17. Barnes struggled in the second half of the season, and eventually lost his role as the closer before the end of the season. As a result of his struggles, Barnes was left off the initial ALDS and ALCS rosters for the Red Sox, although he was added onto the ALDS roster after an injury to Garrett Richards. It was later revealed that Barnes had cut off the tip of the thumb on his left (non-throwing) hand with a knife while cooking, which contributed to his late season struggles. Overall during the 2021 regular season, Barnes made 60 appearances, all in relief, with a 3.79 ERA while registering 24 saves and striking out 84 batters in 54 2/3 innings.

Barnes returned to the Red Sox bullpen for the 2022 season. He compiled a 7.94 ERA through the end of May, and was placed on the injured list with shoulder inflammation on June 1. On July 13, Barnes was transferred to the 60-day injured list. He returned to the team on August 4. In 44 games with the Red Sox during 2022, Barnes accrued a 4.31 ERA with an 0–4 record and 8 saves, while striking out 34 batters in 39 2/3 innings.

On January 24, 2023, Barnes was designated for assignment by the Red Sox, to clear roster space for Adam Duvall.

=== Miami Marlins ===
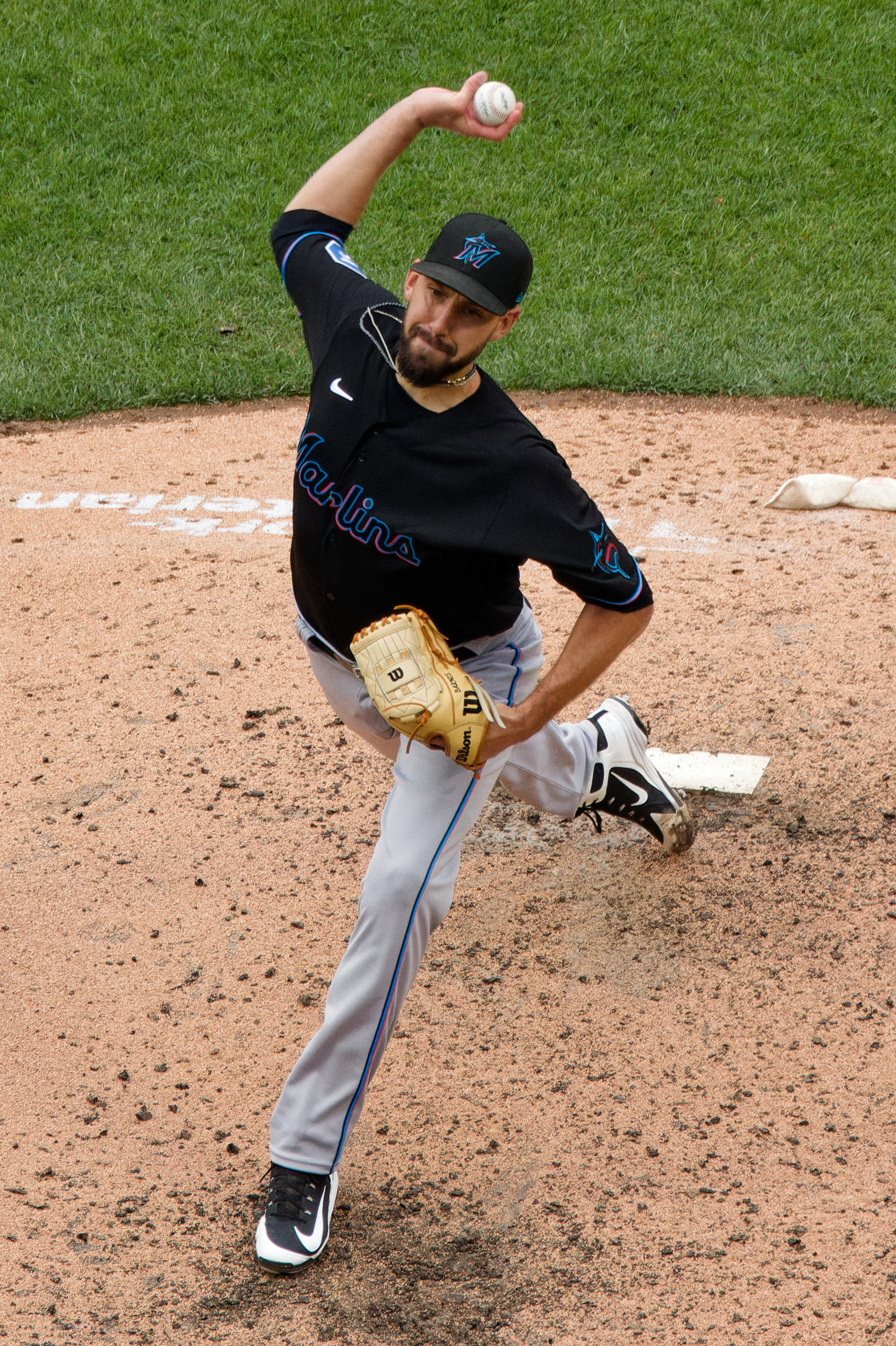
Barnes with the Marlins in 2023

Barnes was traded to the Miami Marlins on January 30, 2023, in exchange for relief pitcher Richard Bleier. In 24 appearances for Miami, Barnes posted a 5.48 ERA with 20 strikeouts in 21 1/3 innings pitched. On July 14, it was announced that Barnes would undergo femoral acetabular impingement surgery on his left hip, and likely miss the remainder of the season. He became a free agent following the season.

=== Washington Nationals ===
On February 27, 2024, Barnes signed a minor league contract with the Washington Nationals that included an invitation to spring training. On March 24, the Nationals selected Barnes' contract. In 14 games for Washington, he struggled to a 6.75 ERA with 10 strikeouts across 13 1/3 innings. On May 7, Barnes was designated for assignment. He cleared waivers and was sent outright to the Triple–A Rochester Red Wings on May 9; however, he subsequently rejected the assignment and elected free agency on May 10.

On August 9, 2026, Barnes announced his retirement from professional baseball via Instagram.

== Personal life ==
Barnes began holding an annual baseball clinic at the Newtown, Connecticut, Youth Academy for elementary school students in December 2013. Barnes was married in January 2019 to Chelsea Barnes.

In 2024, Barnes became a part-owner of USL League One soccer team Texoma FC.
