= Woosung =

Woosung may refer to:

- Wusong District, an area of Shanghai, China formerly transliterated as Woosung
- Suzhou Creek, a small river formerly also known as Woosung River
- Woosung, Illinois, a town in United States named after Wusong, China.
- Woo-sung (name), a Korean given name
  - Kim Woo-sung (singer), known mononymously as Woosung
