= No Sung-ho =

South Korean baseball player

No Sung-Ho
- Pitcher
- Born: October 22, 1989 (age 36)
- Batted: Left Threw: Left

KBO debut
- April 5, 2013, for the NC Dinos

Last KBO appearance
- October 10, 2023, for the Samsung Lions

KBO statistics
- Win–loss record: 7–20
- Earned run average: 6.44
- Strikeouts: 228
- Stats at Baseball Reference

Teams
- NC Dinos (2013–2015, 2018–2019); Samsung Phoenix (2016–2017); Samsung Lions (2020–2023)

No Sung-Ho (Korean: 노성호; born October 22, 1989, in Incheon) is a South Korean former pitcher who played for the Samsung Lions in the Korea Baseball Organization. He bats and throws left-handed.

== Amateur career ==
No attended Hwasun High School in Jeollanam-do. After being undrafted out of high school, he continued to play baseball at Dongguk University. As a freshman in 2008 No led his team to the national championship at the 42nd President's Flag National Collegiate Championship, earning tournament MVP honors.

No was called up to the South Korean national baseball team during his sophomore and junior seasons, and competed in the 2009 Baseball World Cup and 2010 World University Baseball Championship.

As a senior in 2011, No went 4–3 with a 3.49 ERA and whiffed 51 batters in 46 1/3 innings pitched. He helped his team win the KBO's Flag National Collegiate Championship, and was named MVP and best pitcher of the tournament.

=== Notable international careers ===
Year	Venue	Competition	Team	Individual note
2009	Europe	Baseball World Cup	9th	0-0; 0.00 ERA (2 G, 1.2 IP, 0 ER, 0 K)
2010	Japan	World University Baseball Championship	4th	0-2; 17.05 ERA (3 G, 6.1 IP, 12 ER, 0 K)

== Professional career ==
In the 2012 KBO Draft, Lee was selected by the NC Dinos as the first overall pick, along with Lee Min-Ho. During the 2012 season in the Futures League, he showed enough promise to be placed on the Dinos' starting rotation for their inaugural KBO season in 2013, going 6–2 with a 3.36 ERA and 79 strikeouts in 75 innings pitched.

No was projected to be the Dinos' fifth starter in 2013. No made his KBO league debut against the Samsung Lions on April 5, 2013, as a starting pitcher. He threw 53 pitches and allowed five earned runs in only one inning pitched in a 10–4 loss. After the game he was sent to the bullpen but never fully recovered, posting a +10.00 ERA through the first two months of the season. At the end of May, No was demoted to the Dinos' second-tier team in the KBO Futures League. No was called up to the first team again in late June and appeared in eight games as a relief pitcher before he made his second start for the Dinos on July 26, giving up three runs in five innings.
