= Lee Tae-won =

South Korean baseball player

Lee Tae-Won

NC Dinos – No. 43
- Catcher
- Born: March 17, 1986 (age 40)
- Batted: Right Threw: Right

KBO debut
- April 24, 2013, for the NC Dinos

Last appearance
- 2014, for the NC Dinos

KBO statistics
- Batting average: .135
- Home runs: 0
- RBI: 8
- Stats at Baseball Reference

Teams
- LG Twins Futures League team (2010); Sangmu Phoenix (2011–2012); NC Dinos (2013–2014)

- Lee Tae-won
- Hangul: 이태원
- RR: I Taewon
- MR: I T'aewŏn

Lee Tae-won (Korean: 이태원. Born March 17, 1986, in Seoul, South Korea) is a South Korean former catcher for the NC Dinos in the KBO League. He bats and throws right-handed.

== Amateur career ==
Lee played baseball at Choongam High School in Seoul from 2002 to 2004. Prior to graduation, he was selected in the 2nd round (47th overall) of the 2005 KBO draft by the LG Twins, which was the second-highest pick as a high school catcher. Although Lee was willing to play in the KBO without going to college, his mother opposed his decision strongly, and that conflict led him to give up baseball temporarily.

After sitting out the whole 2005 season, Lee eventually came back in 2006, deciding to play college baseball at Dongguk University. During his four-year college years, Lee was recognized as one of the best amateur catchers nationwide, becoming a fixture in the team's starting lineup in his freshman year and helping his team to win the national championship twice (in 2006 and 2008).

Lee made his first appearance on the international stage when he was selected for the South Korea national baseball team that would play in the 2006 Intercontinental Cup. In 2009 Lee was called up to the South Korean national team and competed in the Asian Baseball Championship where he was named to the All-Star team, playing in all the games as a starting catcher and batting a team-leading .556.

=== Notable international careers ===
Year	Venue	Competition	Team	Individual note
2006	Philippines	Intercontinental Cup	7th	2 doubles
2008	Czech Republic	World University Baseball Championship	4th	.182 BA (4-for-22), 3 RBI, 3 R
2009	Japan	Asian Baseball Championship	Bronze medal	.556 BA (5-for-9), 1 RBI, 3 R, 2 BB, 1 SB; All-Star (C)

== Professional career ==
Lee was selected in the 5th round (33rd overall) of the 2010 KBO Draft by the LG Twins. In the 2010 season, Lee played with the Twins' second-tier team but received criticism after batting below .200 and making critical errors behind the plate. After the 2010 season, Lee joined the Sangmu Baseball Team to do a two-year mandatory military service.

He played sparingly for the NC Dinos in 2013–2014, mostly as a late-inning defensive replacement. He finished his career with a total of 20 hits in 148 at-bats for a batting average of .135.
