= Lee Min-ho (disambiguation) =

Lee Min-ho (born 1987) is a South Korean actor and singer.

Lee Min-ho may also refer to:

- Boom (entertainer), stage name of Lee Min-ho (born 1982), South Korean entertainer
- Lee Know, stage name of Lee Min-ho (born 1998), South Korean singer and dancer, and member of boy band Stray Kids
- Lee Min-ho (baseball) (born 1993), South Korean baseball pitcher
- Lee Tae-ri, stage name of Lee Min-ho (born 1993), South Korean actor
