= Kim Sung-bae =

Kim Sung-bae may refer to:

- Kim Sung-bae (baseball)
- Kim Sung-bae (tennis)
