= Maxim Răileanu =

Moldovan long-distance runner

Maxim Raileanu
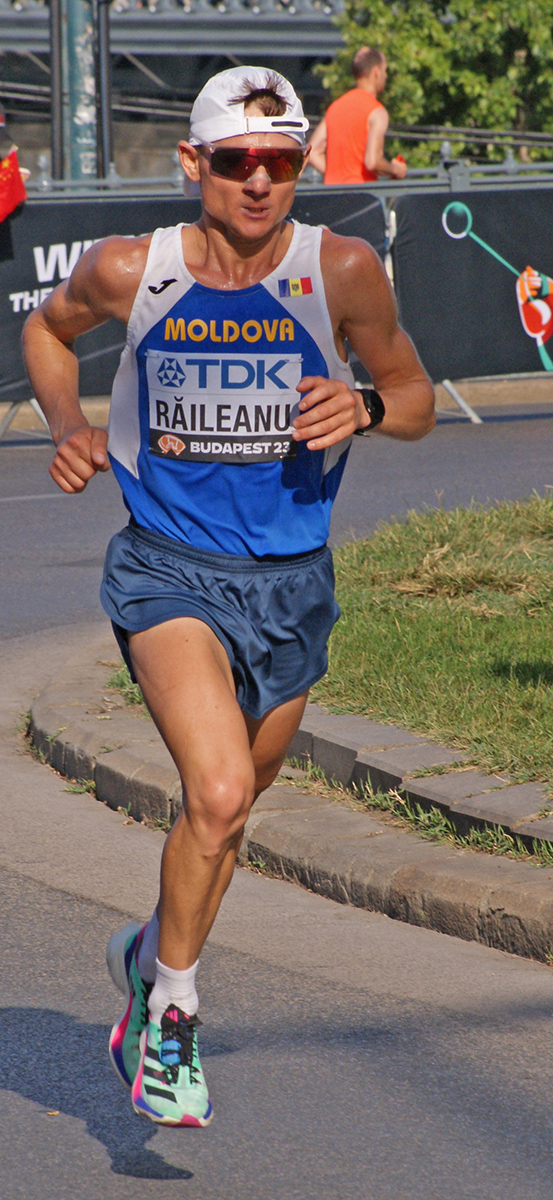

Personal information
- Born: 4 October 1994 (age 31)

Sport
- Country: Moldova
- Sport: Athletics
- Event: Long-distance running
Medal record
Men's long-distance running
Representing Moldova
Balkan Athletics Championships
Bronze medal – third place	2016 Pitești	5000 m

Maxim Raileanu (born 4 October 1994) is a Moldovan long-distance runner. In 2020, he competed in the men's race at the 2020 World Athletics Half Marathon Championships held in Gdynia, Poland.

In 2019, he competed in the men's half marathon at the 2019 Summer Universiade held in Naples, Italy.
