= Woo-sung (name) =

- Hangul: 우성
- RR: Useong
- MR: Usŏng

Woo-sung is a Korean given name.

People with this name include:

- Hyun Woo-sung (born 1979), South Korean actor
- Jung Woo-sung (born 1973), South Korean actor and director
- Kam Woo-sung (born 1970), South Korean actor
- Lee Woo-sung (born 1984), South Korean baseball player
- Kim Woo-sung (alpine skier) (born 1986), South Korean alpine skier
- Kim Woo-sung (singer) (born 1993), American singer of Korean descent, member of The Rose

== See also ==
- List of Korean given names
