= Önder Şipal =

Turkish boxer (born 1987)

Personal information
- Nationality: Turkish
- Born: 1 May 1987 (age 39)

Sport
- Country: Turkey
- Sport: Amateur boxing
- Event: Welterweight
- Club: Fenerbahçe Boxing
Medal record
Mediterranean Games
Gold medal – first place	2009 Pescara	Welterweight
Bronze medal – third place	2005 Almeíra	Light Welterweight
World University Boxing Championships
Gold medal – first place	2010 Ulaanbaatar	Welterweight
EU Championships
Bronze medal – third place	2003 Cagliari	Light Welterweight
Bronze medal – third place	2006 Pécs	Light Welterweight

Önder Şipal (born 1 May 1987) is a Turkish amateur boxer competing in the welterweight (69 kg) division. He is a member of Istanbul Fenerbahçe Boxing Club.

His brother Onur Şipal is also an amateur boxer.

== Career ==
Şipal participated at the 2005 Mediterranean Games in Almería, Spain, and won a bronze medal. He boxed a gold medal at the 2009 Mediterranean Games in Pescara, Italy.

At the 2006 European Amateur Boxing Championships held in Plovdiv, Bulgaria, he lost his first match against Ionut Gheorghe.

He won the gold medal in welterweight division at the 2010 World University Boxing Championship held in Ulaanbaatar, Mongolia.
