= Park Sei-hyok =

South Korean baseball player (born 1990)

Samsung Lions – No. 52
- Catcher
- Born: January 9, 1990 (age 36); Seoul, South Korea
- Bats: Left Throws: Right

KBO debut
- June 16, 2012, for the Doosan Bears

KBO statistics (through June 4, 2024)
- Batting average: .254
- Home runs: 30
- Runs batted in: 295
- Stats at Baseball Reference

Teams
- Doosan Bears (2012–2022); Sangmu Phoenix (2014–2015); NC Dinos (2023–2025); Samsung Lions (2026–current)

Career highlights and awards
- 2x Korean Series champion (2016, 2019)

Park Sei-Hyok (born 9 January 1990), nicknamed "Triple Machine", is a South Korean baseball player for the Samsung Lions in the KBO League. His position is the catcher.

Park is the son of former KBO player Park Chul-woo, a slugger who won the 1989 Korean Series Most Valuable Player Award for the Haitai Tigers.

== Career ==
Upon graduation from Shinil High School, Park was selected 48th overall by the LG Twins in the 2008 KBO draft, but decided to play college baseball. After graduating from Korea University, he was selected 47th overall by the Doosan Bears in the 2012 draft.

After spending two mediocre seasons in the Bears, he temporarily left the team to serve a two-year mandatory military commitment. He played for the Sangmu Phoenix as the military duty in 2014 and 2015.

In 2019 Park was named as the Bears' starting catcher after KBO's best catcher Yang Eui-ji's departure to the NC Dinos via free agency. Park set the KBO single-season record for the most triples by a catcher with nine in the 2019 season. On October 25 Park hit a triple in Game 3 of the 2019 Korean Series which made him become the sixth catcher to hit a triple in the Korean Series. Park batted .417 (5-for-12) with four RBIs as the Bears swept the Kiwoom Heroes in four games in the Korean Series.
