= Kim Jeong-hu =

- Pitcher
- Born: 26 September 1988 (age 36); Seoul
- Bats: Right Throws: Right

KBO debut
- 2013, for the SK Wyverns

Teams
- Sangmu Phoenix (2011–2012) (army); SK Wyverns (2013); Doosan Bears (2018)

Kim Jeong-hu (Korean: 김정후; born 26 September 1988) is a South Korean professional baseball pitcher who is currently a free agent. He graduated from Dankook University and was selected by the SK Wyverns in the second draft in 2013. Kim joined the SK Wyverns, but after injury and personal reasons he came out of the team after the 2014 season. He turned to pitcher and worked in Japan's independent league. He returned to South Korea in 2018 and joined the Doosan Bears.
