= 2010 World University Boxing Championship =

Boxing competition in Ulaanbaatar, Mongolia

The 2010 World University Boxing Championships were held in Ulaanbaatar, Mongolia from October 4 – 10. The Championships was staged in 10 weight categories with bouts of three three-minute rounds with a one-minute rest between rounds, according to the current rules of the AIBA.

== Participating nations ==
- Belarus
- Costa Rica
- Chinese Taipei
- Czech Republic
- Kazakhstan
- Lithuania
- Moldova
- Mongolia
- Netherlands
- Poland
- Russia
- Slovakia
- Thailand
- Turkey
- Ukraine

== Results ==
Bronze medals are awarded to both losing semi-finalists.

2010 World University Boxing Championship
Weight	Gold	Silver	Bronze	
49 kg	(Mongolia) Pürevdorjiin Serdamba	(Kazakhstan) Mardan Berkbayev	(Poland) Łukasz Maszczyk	(Turkey) Ferhat Pehlivan
52 kg	(Mongolia) Tugstsogt Nyambayar	(Kazakhstan) Khabi Akhunov	(Ukraine) Victor Gogolev	(Russia) Dimitry Sotnikov
56 kg	(Turkey) Furkan Ulaş Memiş	(Mongolia) Enkhjahrgal Iderkhuu	(Russia) Sergey Zokharov	(Thailand) Thathi Donchai
60 kg	(Ukraine) Denys Berinchyk	(Kazakhstan) Gani Zhailauov	(Mongolia) Dorjnyambuugiin Otgondalai	(Chinese Taipei) Wu Hao-Pai
64 kg	(Mongolia) Byambyn Tüvshinbat	(Turkey) Onur Şipal	(Kazakhstan) Aidar Sharibayev	(Belarus) Dzianis Yutskevich
69 kg	(Turkey) Önder Şipal	(Kazakhstan) Rustam Svayev	(Mongolia) L Shinetulga	(Moldova) Vasilji Belous
75 kg	(Russia) Andrey Efremenko	(Belarus) Siarhei Yeustafyeu	(Kazakhstan) Adilbek Niyazymbetov	(Chinese Taipei) Yang Yu-Ting
81 kg	(Russia) Ruslan Fayfer	(Mongolia) S Erdenebayar	(Kazakhstan) Arbek Abduganiyev	(Turkey) Dindar Gölçek
91 kg	(Kazakhstan) Daniyar Ustembayev	(Russia) Alexander Karakazan	(Turkey) Bahram Muzaffer	(Lithuania) Eugenijus Tutkus
+91 kg	(Russia) Arslanbek Makhmudov	(Mongolia) Davaalkhagva Iderbat	(Kazakhstan) Rustam Rygebayev	

== Medal count table ==
2010 World University Boxing Championship
Pos	Country	Gold	Silver	Bronze	Total
1	Mongolia	3	3	2	8
2	Russia	3	1	2	6
3	Turkey	2	1	3	6
4	Kazakhstan	1	4	4	9
5	Ukraine	1		1	2
6	Belarus		1	1	2
7	Chinese Taipei			2	2
8	Lithuania			1	1
8	Moldova			1	1
8	Poland			1	1
8	Thailand			1	1
Total		10	10	19	39

== See also ==
- 2010 World University Baseball Championship
- 2010 World University Rugby Sevens Championship
