= Lee Hyun-ho (baseball) =

Hanwha Eagles – No. 11
- Pitcher
- Born: July 14, 1992 (age 33); Incheon
- Bats: Left Throws: Left

KBO debut
- Hanhwa Eagles

KBO statistics (through June 25, 2019)
- Win–loss record: 8–3
- Earned run average: 5.40
- Strikeouts: 184
- Stats at Baseball Reference

Teams
- Doosan Bears (2011–2019); Sangmu Baseball Team (2013–2014)

Lee Hyun-ho (Korean: 이현호; Hanja: 李顯鎬; born 14 July 1992) is a South Korean professional baseball pitcher who is currently playing for the Hanhwa Eagles of the Korea Baseball Organization. He graduated from Jemulpo High School (제물포고등학교; 濟物浦高等學校) and was selected to Doosan Bears by a draft in 2011.(2nd round)
