= Oh Hyoun-taek =

South Korean baseball player

Oh Hyoun-Taek

Lotte Giants – No. 15
- Relief pitcher
- Born: July 17, 1985 (age 39)
- Bats: Right Throws: Right

KBO debut
- 2009, for the Doosan Bears

KBO statistics (through May 2, 2019)
- Win–loss record: 16–11
- Strikeouts: 284
- Earned run average: 4.17

Teams
- Doosan Bears (2008–2017); Sangmu Baseball Team (2010–2012); Lotte Giants (2018–present)

Oh Hyoun-Taek (Korean: 오현택; Hanja: 吳賢澤; born July 17, 1985 in Seoul) is a South Korean sidearm relief pitcher for the Lotte Giants of the KBO League. He bats and throws right-handed.

== Professional career ==
Oh played college baseball at Wonkwang University. After graduating, he went undrafted in the 2008 KBO Draft. Oh was signed by the Doosan Bears as an undrafted free agent prior to the 2008 KBO season. Oh was promoted to the Bears' first team in the 2009 season, but appeared in only 14 games as a relief pitcher, posting a 4.45 ERA in 30.1 innings pitched. After having another mediocre season in 2010 when Oh earned his first win as a pro but pitched only 15.1 innings, he joined the Korea Armed Forces Athletic Corps Baseball Team to serve a two-year mandatory military duty.

In October 2011, Oh competed in the 2011 Baseball World Cup held in Panama as a member of the South Korean national baseball team. In his first international competition ever, Oh had impressive performances, compiling a 0.40 ERA, racking up 2 wins as a starting pitcher and fanning a tournament-leading 35 batters. He shut out Australia (8.0 IP, 12 K) and Italy (7.2 IP, 14 K), and was named to the All-Star team as a starting pitcher.

=== Notable international careers ===
Year	Venue	Competition	Team	Individual Note
2011	Panama	Baseball World Cup	6th	2–1, 0.40 ERA (5 G, 22.2 IP, 1 ER, 35 K); All-Star (SP)
