= Saffet Elkatmış =

Turkish long-distance runner

Personal information
- Born: 1 November 1995 (age 29)

Sport
- Country: Turkey
- Sport: Athletics
- Event: Long-distance running

Saffet Elkatmış (born 1 November 1995) is a Turkish long-distance runner. He competed in the men's race at the 2020 World Athletics Half Marathon Championships held in Gdynia, Poland.

In 2019, he competed in the men's half marathon at the Summer Universiade held in Naples, Italy. He finished in 7th place. He won the silver medal in the team event.
