= 2010 World University Rugby Sevens Championship =

The 2010 World University Rugby Sevens Championship will be the fourth edition of the World University Championship (WUC) for rugby sevens national teams. This event took place on July 21–24, 2010, in Porto, Portugal, at the Estádio do Bessa. Under the supervision of the International University Sports Federation (FISU), this championship will be co-organized by the Portuguese university sports federation (FADU) and the University of Porto, whose bid was chosen by the FISU Executive Committee on January 15, 2007, following a 15–6 ballot win against a French bid.

This event will feature a men's competition with 24 teams and a women's competition with eight teams. In both cases, these teams will be selected by the FISU Executive Committee. Each participating country can enter one team in both competitions, with a maximum number of twelve players, provided that they were born between January 1, 1982, and December 31, 1992. The delegations of each participating country must not exceed 17 members, and has to include a national referee recognized by the International Rugby Board (IRB).

== See also ==
- 2010 World University Baseball Championship
- 2010 World University Boxing Championship
