= Onur Şipal =

Turkish boxer (born 1989)

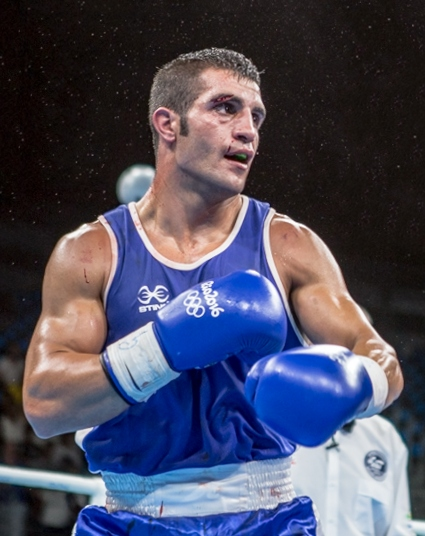
- Şipal at the 2016 Olympics

Personal information
- Nationality: Turkish
- Born: March 17, 1989 (age 37) Bayburt, Turkey
- Height: 1.72 m (5.6 ft)
- Weight: 69 kg (152 lb)

Sport
- Country: Turkey
- Sport: Amateur boxing
- Event: Lightweight
- Club: Fenerbahçe Boxing
- Coached by: Seyfullah Dumlupinar
Medal record
Representing Turkey
Mediterranean Games
Bronze medal – third place	2018 Tarragona	Welterweight
Summer Universiade
Bronze medal – third place	2013 Kazan	Welterweight
World University Boxing Championships
Silver medal – second place	2010 Ulaanbaatar	Lightweight

Onur Şipal (born March 17, 1989) is a Turkish amateur boxer who competed at the 2008 and 2016 Summer Olympics. He is a southpaw and competes in the welterweight division. His brother Önder Şipal is also an amateur boxer.

== Career ==
Şipal became the 2005 Cadet World silver medalist at featherweight when he lost to Yordan Frometa 21:30.

He beat in 2007 senior world champion Yordenis Ugás in Turkey at 60 kg/lightweight (final of the Ahmet Comert International Tournament).

At the 2007 World Amateur Boxing Championships, he lost to southpaw surprise winner Frankie Gavin (boxer) from England in the quarterfinal but qualified for the Olympics in Beijing. There he lost his debut to Jose Pedraza (boxer). He won the silver medal in lightweight division at the 2010 World University Boxing Championship held in Ulaanbaatar, Mongolia. At the 2013 Summer Universiade in Kazan, Russia, he won the bronze medal in the welterweight division.

In 2016, prior to the 2016 Summer Olympics in Rio de Janeiro, Onur Şipal won a gold medal in the Eindhoven Box Cup 2016 in the Netherlands. In the quarterfinals he won against Rio qualified Arajik Marutjan (Germany) by split decision. The semi-finals he saw a unanimous win over Abdul Ibrahim (England). In the final Şipal won by split decision over the Netherlands' Delano James.
