= Park Hee-soo =

South Korean baseball player

Samsung Lions – No. 87
- Relief pitcher / Coach
- Born: July 13, 1983 (age 42)
- Batted: Left Threw: Left

KBO debut
- August 4, 2006, for the SK Wyverns

Last appearance
- September 19, 2020, for the SK Wyverns

KBO statistics
- Win–loss record: 21–22
- Saves: 79
- Holds: 60
- Earned run average: 3.02
- Strikeouts: 408
- Stats at Baseball Reference

Teams
- As player: SK Wyverns (2006–2020); As coach: Samsung Lions (2023–present)

Career highlights and awards
- KBO hold leader (2012)

Park Hee-soo (Korean: 박희수; Hanja: 朴熙洙; born July 13, 1983, in Daejeon) is a South Korean baseball coach for the Samsung Lions in the Korea Baseball Organization. He batted right-handed and threw left-handed as relief pitcher.

== Amateur career ==
While attending Daejeon High School, Park was selected for the South Korean national baseball team to compete at the 2001 Asian Junior Baseball Championship hosted by Taiwan. After graduation, Park was drafted by the SK Wyverns in 2002 in the 2nd round and as the 43rd pick overall, but decided to play college baseball at Dongguk University.

=== Notable international careers ===
Year	Venue	Competition	Team
2001	Chinese Taipei	Asian Junior Baseball Championship	Bronze medal

== Professional career ==
After graduation from Dongguk University in 2006 Park started his pro season in the SK Wyverns. In his rookie season Park only appeared in five games as a left-handed specialist. After the 2006 season, Park entered Sangmu Baseball Team to serve two-year military service. Park came back to the Wyverns in 2010 but had a mediocre season posting a 4.58 ERA in 14 games as a relief pitcher.

In 2011, Park served primarily as a setup pitcher for closer Chong Tae-Hyon, typically pitching in the seventh and eighth innings of games before Chong pitched in the ninth. In the season, Park finished with a 1.88 ERA and 8 holds in 67 innings pitched.

Park had a career year in 2012, as he had an 8–1 record with a career-low 1.32 ERA and six saves in 65 games. Park also set a KBO league record with 34 holds, two more than the previous mark equaled by Kwon Oh-Joon with the Samsung Lions in 2006.

=== Notable international careers ===
Year	Venue	Competition	Team	Individual Note
2010	Chinese Taipei	Intercontinental Cup	6th	0–0, 2.84 ERA (3 G, 6.1 IP, 2 ER, 6 K)
