= Lee Min-ho (baseball) =

South Korean baseball player

NC Dinos – No. 29
- Relief pitcher
- Born: August 11, 1993 (age 32)
- Bats: Right Throws: Right

KBO debut
- April 2, 2013, for the NC Dinos

KBO statistics (through June 20, 2019)
- Win–loss record: 33–24
- Saves: 31
- Strikeouts: 470
- Earned run average: 4.88
- Stats at Baseball Reference

Teams
- NC Dinos (2012–present)

Lee Min-ho (Korean: 이민호; born August 11, 1993) is a South Korean relief pitcher who plays for the NC Dinos in the Korea Baseball Organization. He bats and throws right-handed.

== Amateur career ==
Lee was born in Busan. He attended Busan High School. In 2010 Lee led his team to the national championship at the 62nd Hwarang Flag National Championship, racking two wins and posting a 0.78 ERA in 23.0 innings pitched in the tourney. He earned tournament MVP honors as well.

In August 2011 Lee was selected as a member of the South Korean U-18 national team for the Asian Junior Baseball Championship held in Yokohama, Japan. He started Team Korea's third game of the round robin phase against Thailand and pitched two scoreless innings with four strikeouts en route to a 20–0 win.

=== Notable international appearances ===
Year	Venue	Competition	Team	Individual Note
2011	Japan	Asian Junior Championship	Silver medal	0-0, 0.00 ERA (2 G, 3.0 IP, 0 ER, 6 K)

== Professional career ==
In the 2012 KBO Draft, Lee was selected by the NC Dinos as the first overall pick, along with No Sung-ho. Prior to the 2012 season, Lee had surgery to remove a bone chip from his elbow, and missed the first half of the season. In the 2012 Futures League season, Lee was 0–4 with a 5.49 ERA over 19 2/3 innings.

Lee started the 2013 season as a setup man and was named the Dinos' closer in May replacing Kim Jin-sung who posted a 10.50 ERA with no save in the opening month of the season. As a closer Lee finished the season ranked ninth in saves with 10.

Lee started 2014 with the Dino's as a starting pitcher and was moved to the bullpen after five starts. He finished the 2014 season with a 5.01 ERA. Following the season, his ERA dipped to 5.06.

Though Lee compiled a decent record of 9–9 with two saves both as a starter and reliever in the 2016 season, his ERA dipped again to 5.51.
