= Akira Aizawa =

Japanese athlete (born 1997)

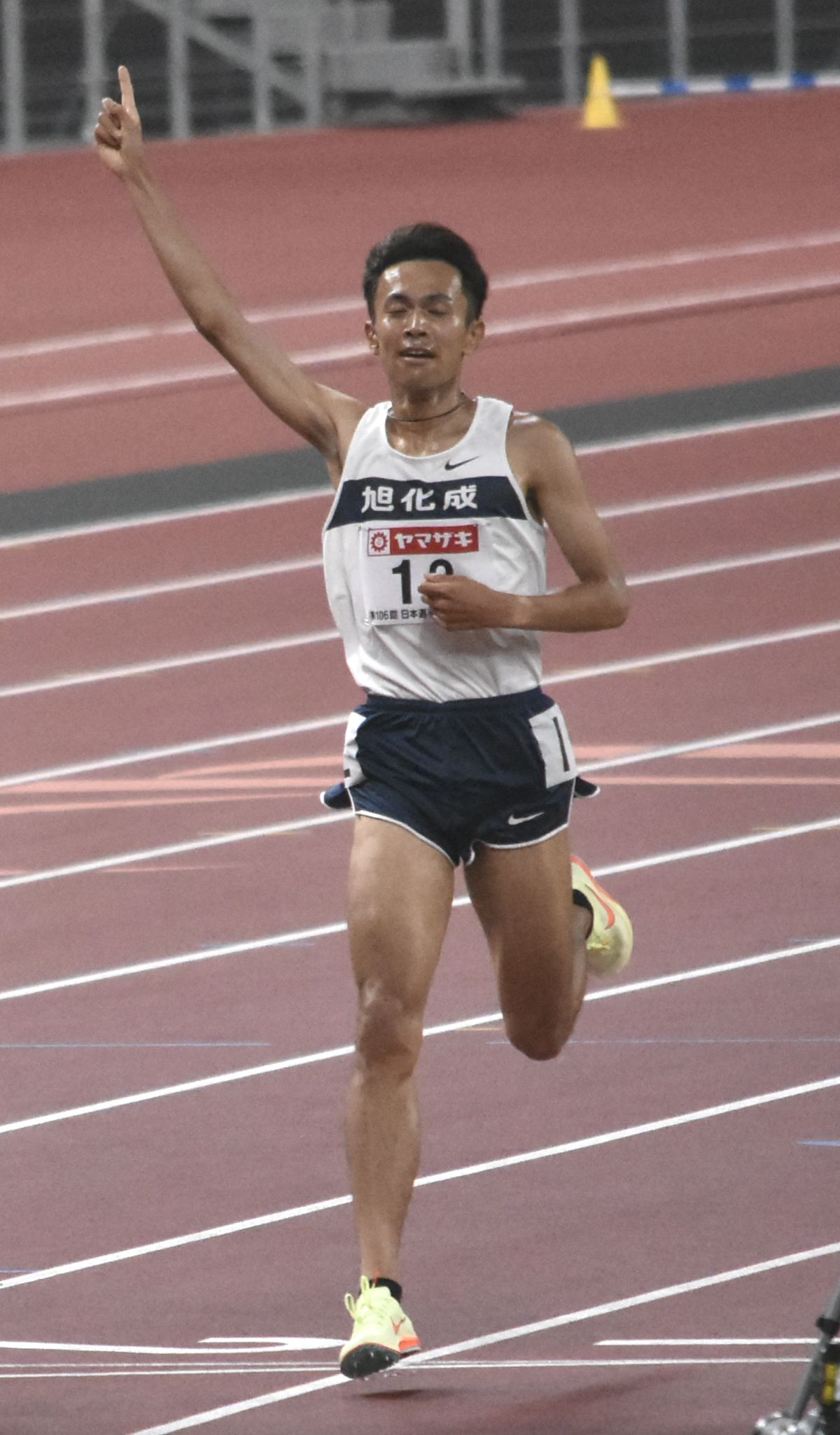

Personal information
- Born: 18 July 1997 (age 29) Sukagawa, Japan
- Height: 1.78 m (5 ft 10 in)
- Weight: 63 kg (139 lb)

Sport
- Sport: Athletics
- Events: 5000 metres; 10000 metres; Half marathon
- University team: Toyo University
Medal record
Men's athletics
Representing Japan
Universiade
Gold medal – first place	2019 Napoles	Half marathon

Akira Aizawa (相澤晃, born 18 July 1997) is a Japanese long-distance runner.

On 4 December 2020, he won the 10,000m race at the Japanese national championships in a time of 27:18:75 at the Nagai Stadium, Osaka. In doing so, he broke the Japanese national record and ran the Olympic qualifying standard time to secure a place at his home 2020 Tokyo Olympics.

== Personal bests ==
Outdoor

- 5000 metres – 13:29.47 (Tokyo 2021)
- 10000 metres – 27:18.75 (Osaka 2020)
- Half marathon – 1:01:45 (Tachikawa 2019)
