= Sangmu Phoenix (baseball) =

Korea Baseball Futures League franchise in Seongnam, South Korea

Sangmu Phoenix 상무 피닉스
Logo
Cap insignia

Information
- League: Korea Baseball Futures League
- Location: Mungyeong, Gyeongbuk
- Ballpark: Sangmu Baseball Stadium
- Founded: 1953; 73 years ago
- Nickname: Bulsajo (Phoenix)
- Colors: Mustard and black
- Ownership: Korea Armed Forces

Sangmu Phoenix (Korean: 상무 피닉스 야구단) is a South Korean professional baseball team founded in 1953. The team is part of the Korea Armed Forces Athletic Corps, and they play in the KBO Futures League. Their home stadium is Sangmu Baseball Stadium located in Mungyeong.

Many professional players who are serving compulsory military service play for the Phoenix, usually for a term of two seasons. The team is not affiliated with any single KBO League team, but over its history has had a number of players from the Doosan Bears franchise.

The Sangmu Phoenix were champions of the Futures League's Southern League division in 2013, 2014, 2016, 2017, 2018, and 2019.

== Current lineup ==
This needs updating.

2016–17 squad
Roster
Pitchers: 11 Moon Sung-hyun; 19 Yang-Hyun; 21 No Sung-ho; 43 Moon Gyeong-chan; 51 Koo Seung-min; 55 Lim Ji-seob; 58 Lee Seung-jin; 68 Yang Hyung-jin; -- Yun Myeong-jun; -- Heo Jun-hyuk; -- Kang Dong-yepn; -- Song Chang-hyun; -- Kim Min-soo; -- Lee Jun-yeong; -- Jeon Sang-hyun; -- Park Min-ho; -- Cho Young-woo	Catchers: 26 Kim Eung-min; 32 Lee Yun-Jae; -- Kim Jun-tae; -- Choi Yong-Je; Infielders: 2 Lee Chang-jin; 3 No Jin-hyuk; 4 Oh Yun-seok; 36 Park Ji-gyu; -- Hwang Dae-in; -- Park Gye-beom; -- Kang Min-gook; -- Moon Sang-chul	Outfielders: 12 Song Min-seob; 67 Park Eu-Deum; -- Choi Seung-min; -- Kim Min-hyuk; -- Jang Wun-ho	Manager: 74 Park Chi-wang; Coaches: 71 Lee Dae-hwan (pitching); 72 Choo Seung-woo (defense); 73 Cho Jae-ho (first base); 75 Lee Yeong-su (hitting); 78 Kim Ki-nam (battery)

== Notable former players ==
Name	Years played	KBO Team
Back Sang-won	2011–2012	Samsung Lions
Choi Joo-hwan	2009–2011	Doosan Bears
Jung Jin-ho	2013–2014	Doosan Bears
Jung Ju-hyeon	2014–2018	LG Twins
Hong Hyun-bin	2019–2020	KT Wiz
Kim Jae-hwan	2009–2010	Doosan Bears
Kim Jeong-hu	2011-2012	SK Wyverns
Kim Sung-bae	2006–2008	Doosan Bears
Ko Jong-wook	2012–2013	Nexen Heroes
Lee Hyun-ho	2013–2014	Doosan Bears
Lee Hyun-seung	2011–2013	Doosan Bears
Lee Woo-sung	2014–2015	Doosan Bears
Lee Yong-chan	2015–2016	Doosan Bears
Lee Tae-won	2011-2012	NC Dinos (Note: Sent down by the LG Twins, but traded to the Dinos while with the Phoenix.)
Moon Sung-hyun	2016–2017	Nexen Heroes
No Jin-hyuk	2016–2017	NC Dinos
No Sung-ho	2016-2017	NC Dinos
Oh Hyoun-taek	2010–2012	Doosan Bears
Oh Ju-won	2007–2008	Nexen Heroes (Note: Before playing with the Phoenix, played with the Hyundai Unicorns, who went defunct after the 2006 season.)
Byung-ho Park	2007–2008	LG Twins
Park Hee-soo	2007–2009	SK Wyverns
Park Sei-hyok	2014–2015	Doosan Bears
Ryu Ji-hyuk	2013–2014	Doosan Bears
Yoo Hee-kwan	2011–2012	Doosan Bears
Yoon Myung-june	2017–2018	Doosan Bears

== See also ==
- Gimcheon Sangmu FC
- Mungyeong Sangmu WFC
- Korean Police Baseball Team
