= Kim Sung-bae (baseball) =

South Korean baseball player

- Pitcher
- Born: January 12, 1981 (age 45); Seoul
- Bats: Right Throws: Right

KBO debut
- September 15, 2004, for the Doosan Bears

KBO statistics (through 2017 season)
- Win–loss record: 21–26
- Earned run average: 5.07
- Strikeouts: 337
- Stats at Baseball Reference

Teams
- Doosan Bears (2003–2011); Sangmu Baseball Team (army) (2006–2008); Lotte Giants (2012–2016); Doosan Bears (2016–2017)

- Kim Sung-bae
- Hangul: 김성배
- Hanja: 金成培
- RR: Gim Seongbae
- MR: Kim Sŏngbae

Kim Sung-bae (born January 12, 1981) is a South Korean professional baseball pitcher.
