= Lee Woo-sung =

South Korean baseball player

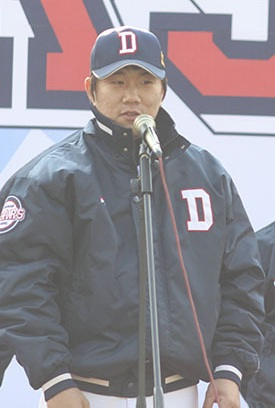
- Lee Woo-sung in 2012

Kia Tigers – No. 25
- Outfielder
- Born: 17 July 1994 (age 31); Daejeon, South Korea
- Bats: Right Throws: Right

KBO debut
- 2016, for the Doosan Bears

KBO statistics (through 2025)
- Batting average: .263
- Home runs: 31
- Runs batted in: 210

Teams
- Sangmu Phoenix (2014–2015); Doosan Bears (2016–2018); NC Dinos (2018–2019); Kia Tigers (2019–present)

- Korean name
- Hangul: 이우성
- Hanja: 李宇盛
- RR: I Useong
- MR: I Usŏng

Lee Woo-sung (Korean: 이우성; born 17 July 1994) is a South Korean professional baseball outfielder and first baseman for the Kia Tigers of the KBO League. He graduated from Daejeon High School. Lee was selected for the Doosan Bears by a draft in 2013.(2nd round)

Originally, he was a promising player in Doosan and NC, and was considered a typical big gun prospect with poor contact, foresight, and defense, but after a brief flash after the KIA transfer, he fell off his most attractive power tool after being hit by Brooks Rayleigh.

After that, he turned into a hustle player who boldly runs and slides while supplementing contacts while losing weight. After the transfer to KIA, he has consistently appealed his presence by stealing several bases with above-average main power along with good defense. Anyway, instead of losing the slugging tool, which was the biggest attraction in batting-related areas, he became a completely different type of player from previous expectations by having versatility.

The pitcher's speed can be recovered, but the batter's punch power is quite slow to recover. However, on May 11, 2022, I tasted the hand of a two-run home run for the first time in a very long time. KIA outfielders are currently saturated, but if they back up Na Sung-bum and Choi Hyung-woo, who need physical management, or stay in shape as starting left-fielders, the last remaining potential could explode. However, Lee Chang-jin, who was also nominated for the Rookie of the Year in 2019, was pushed back from the main competition as he showed a complete revival in late May, and he has continued to play well in every game he played, but has not been able to start.

His main strength has improved a lot in the 2022 season. Originally, he was a player who was attracting attention with only one power, but the growth of the power tool was slow and the main tool improved instead. Obviously, he has been trading after seeing one power, but after the trade, he became a player with everything except power, so he is considered the most different player in the team.
