= 2008 World University Baseball Championship =

Tournament details
- Country: Czech Republic
- Dates: 17–27 July
- Teams: 7
- Defending champions: United States
- Runners-up: Japan
- Third place: Chinese Taipei
- Fourth place: South Korea

Tournament statistics
- Games played: 26

Awards
- MVP: (United States) Blake Smith

The 2008 World University Baseball Championship was an under-23 international college baseball tournament that was held from July 17 to 27, 2008. The final game was held on July 27, 2008 in Brno, Czech Republic. It was the 4th time the University Championship took place. Czech Republic hosted the tournament and 7 nations competed, including defending champions the United States. India was originally to have participated but withdrew.

In the end, the United States won their third University Championship, over a win against runner-up Japan.

== Round 1 ==
=== Standings ===
Qualified for the semi-finals
Did not qualify for the semi-finals

Team	W	L	R	RA	PCT
United States	6	0	59	13	1.000
Japan	5	1	55	21	.833
South Korea	4	2	32	23	.667
Chinese Taipei	3	3	22	16	.500
Canada	2	4	46	22	.333
Czech Republic	1	5	13	31	.167
Lithuania	0	6	2	103	.000

=== Game results ===
July 17, 2008	Czech Republic	3 – 6	South Korea	Ostrava, Czech Republic
July 17, 2008		http://wubc.baseball.cz/modules.php?op=modload&name=online&file=index&do=result1&akce=1&zid=1&pda=2&admina=		Ostrava, Czech Republic

July 18, 2008	South Korea	2 – 5	United States	Ostrava, Czech Republic
July 18, 2008		http://wubc.baseball.cz/modules.php?op=modload&name=online&file=index&do=result1&akce=1&zid=2&pda=2&admina=		Ostrava, Czech Republic

July 18, 2008	Chinese Taipei	6 – 4	Canada	Brno, Czech Republic
July 18, 2008		http://wubc.baseball.cz/modules.php?op=modload&name=online&file=index&do=result1&akce=1&zid=4&pda=2&admina=		Brno, Czech Republic

July 18, 2008	Czech Republic	5 – 0	Lithuania	Ostrava, Czech Republic
July 18, 2008		http://wubc.baseball.cz/modules.php?op=modload&name=online&file=index&do=result1&akce=1&zid=5&pda=2&admina=		Ostrava, Czech Republic

July 19, 2008	Lithuania	0 – 11 (F/7)	South Korea	Ostrava, Czech Republic
July 19, 2008		http://wubc.baseball.cz/modules.php?op=modload&name=online&file=index&do=result1&akce=1&zid=7&pda=2&admina=		Ostrava, Czech Republic

July 19, 2008	Japan	2 – 1	Chinese Taipei	Brno, Czech Republic
July 19, 2008		http://wubc.baseball.cz/modules.php?op=modload&name=online&file=index&do=result1&akce=1&zid=8&pda=2&admina=		Brno, Czech Republic

July 19, 2008	United States	8 – 2	Czech Republic	Ostrava, Czech Republic
July 19, 2008		http://wubc.baseball.cz/modules.php?op=modload&name=online&file=index&do=result1&akce=1&zid=9&pda=2&admina=		Ostrava, Czech Republic

July 20, 2008	Lithuania	1 – 30 (F/7)	United States	Ostrava, Czech Republic
July 20, 2008		http://wubc.baseball.cz/modules.php?op=modload&name=online&file=index&do=result1&akce=1&zid=11&pda=2&admina=		Ostrava, Czech Republic

July 20, 2008	Japan	7 – 6 (F/11)	Canada	Brno, Czech Republic
July 20, 2008		http://wubc.baseball.cz/modules.php?op=modload&name=online&file=index&do=result1&akce=1&zid=12&pda=2&admina=		Brno, Czech Republic

July 21, 2008	South Korea	4 – 8	Japan	Brno, Czech Republic
July 21, 2008		http://wubc.baseball.cz/modules.php?op=modload&name=online&file=index&do=result1&akce=1&zid=13&pda=2&admina=		Brno, Czech Republic

July 21, 2008	Canada	25 – 0 (F/7)	Lithuania	Olomouc, Czech Republic
July 21, 2008		http://wubc.baseball.cz/modules.php?op=modload&name=online&file=index&do=result1&akce=1&zid=14&pda=2&admina=		Olomouc, Czech Republic

July 21, 2008	Chinese Taipei	3 – 2	Czech Republic	Brno, Czech Republic
July 21, 2008		http://wubc.baseball.cz/modules.php?op=modload&name=online&file=index&do=result1&akce=1&zid=15&pda=2&admina=		Brno, Czech Republic

July 22, 2008	South Korea	4 – 3	Chinese Taipei	Brno, Czech Republic
July 22, 2008		http://wubc.baseball.cz/modules.php?op=modload&name=online&file=index&do=result1&akce=1&zid=17&pda=2&admina=		Brno, Czech Republic

July 22, 2008	Lithuania	0 – 25 (F/7)	Japan	Choceň, Czech Republic
July 22, 2008		http://wubc.baseball.cz/modules.php?op=modload&name=online&file=index&do=result1&akce=1&zid=18&pda=2&admina=		Choceň, Czech Republic

July 22, 2008	United States	4 – 3 (F/11)	Canada	Brno, Czech Republic
July 22, 2008		http://wubc.baseball.cz/modules.php?op=modload&name=online&file=index&do=result1&akce=1&zid=19&pda=2&admina=		Brno, Czech Republic

July 23, 2008	Japan	3 – 9	United States	Brno, Czech Republic
July 23, 2008		http://wubc.baseball.cz/modules.php?op=modload&name=online&file=index&do=result1&akce=1&zid=21&pda=2&admina=		Brno, Czech Republic

July 23, 2008	Chinese Taipei	7 – 1	Lithuania	Blansko, Czech Republic
July 23, 2008		http://wubc.baseball.cz/modules.php?op=modload&name=online&file=index&do=result1&akce=1&zid=22&pda=2&admina=		Blansko, Czech Republic

July 23, 2008	Canada	4 – 0	Czech Republic	Brno, Czech Republic
July 23, 2008		http://wubc.baseball.cz/modules.php?op=modload&name=online&file=index&do=result1&akce=1&zid=24&pda=2&admina=		Brno, Czech Republic

July 24, 2008	United States	3 – 2 (F/11)	Chinese Taipei	Brno, Czech Republic
July 24, 2008		http://wubc.baseball.cz/modules.php?op=modload&name=online&file=index&do=result1&akce=1&zid=25&pda=2&admina=		Brno, Czech Republic

July 24, 2008	Canada	4 – 5	South Korea	Olomouc, Czech Republic
July 24, 2008		http://wubc.baseball.cz/modules.php?op=modload&name=online&file=index&do=result1&akce=1&zid=26&pda=2&admina=		Olomouc, Czech Republic

July 24, 2008	Czech Republic	1 – 10	Japan	Brno, Czech Republic
July 24, 2008		http://wubc.baseball.cz/modules.php?op=modload&name=online&file=index&do=result1&akce=1&zid=28&pda=2&admina=		Brno, Czech Republic

== Round 2 ==
=== Semi finals ===
July 26, 2008	United States	3 – 0	Chinese Taipei	Brno, Czech Republic
July 26, 2008		http://wubc.baseball.cz/modules.php?op=modload&name=online&file=index&do=result1&akce=1&zid=29&pda=2&admina=		Brno, Czech Republic

July 26, 2008	Japan	6 – 1	South Korea	Brno, Czech Republic
July 26, 2008		http://wubc.baseball.cz/modules.php?op=modload&name=online&file=index&do=result1&akce=1&zid=31&pda=2&admina=		Brno, Czech Republic

=== Final round ===
==== 5th place game ====
July 27, 2008	Canada	3 – 1	Czech Republic	Brno, Czech Republic
July 27, 2008		http://wubc.baseball.cz/modules.php?op=modload&name=online&file=index&do=result1&akce=1&zid=32&pda=2&admina=		Brno, Czech Republic

==== Bronze medal game ====
July 27, 2008	Chinese Taipei	7 – 0	South Korea	Olomouc, Czech Republic
July 27, 2008		http://wubc.baseball.cz/modules.php?op=modload&name=online&file=index&do=result1&akce=1&zid=33&pda=2&admina=		Olomouc, Czech Republic

==== Final ====
July 27, 2008	Japan	0 – 1 (F/12)	United States	Brno, Czech Republic
July 27, 2008		http://wubc.baseball.cz/modules.php?op=modload&name=online&file=index&do=result1&akce=1&zid=34&pda=2&admina=		Brno, Czech Republic

== Final standings ==
Rk	Team	W	L
1	United States	8	0
Lost in the Final
2	Japan	6	2
Failed to qualify for Final
3	Chinese Taipei	4	4
4	South Korea	4	4
Failed to qualify for the Semi-Finals
5	Canada	3	4
6	Czech Republic	1	6
7	Lithuania	0	6

2008 World University Baseball champions

United States
3rd title
