= Park Min-ho =

Korean baseball player

SSG Landers – No. 41
- Pitcher
- Born: February 25, 1992 (age 33); Incheon, South Korea
- Bats: Right Throws: Right

KBO debut
- June 19, 2014, for the SK Wyverns

Career statistics (through June 7, 2024)
- Win–loss record: 15–8
- Earned run average: 3.63
- Strikeouts: 143

Teams
- SK Wyverns / SSG Landers (2014–present)

Park Min-ho (Korean: 박민호; born February 25, 1992, in Incheon) is a South Korean pitcher for the SSG Landers in the KBO League.
