= 2011 Baseball World Cup =

International amateur baseball tournament

Tournament details
- Country: Panama
- Dates: 1–15 October
- Teams: 16
- Defending champions: United States

Final positions
- Champions: Netherlands (1st title)
- Runners-up: Cuba
- Third place: Canada
- Fourth place: United States

Tournament statistics
- Games played: 67
- Attendance: 156,471 (2,335 per game)

Awards
- MVP: (Netherlands) Curt Smith

The 2011 Baseball World Cup (BWC) was the 39th international Men's amateur baseball tournament. The tournament was sanctioned by the International Baseball Federation, which titled it the Amateur World Series from the 1938 tournament through the 1986 AWS. Panama were first-time hosts (beating out bids from Chinese Taipei and Venezuela), with games held in four cities, from October 1 to 15.

The Netherlands defeated Cuba in the final, winning its first title, and only the second ever for a European team, after Great Britain's win of the inaugural 1938 AWS.

There were 16 participating countries, split into two groups for Round 1, with the first four of each group qualifying for an amalgamated Round 2, which determined the single-game matchups for the finals. Games were played in the Panamanian cities of Aguadulce, Chitré, Panama City and Santiago de Veraguas. The final two medals games were held in Panama City.

This was the final BWC tournament, which was replaced in 2015 by the quadrennial WBSC Premier12.

== Teams ==
Sixteen teams qualified for the tournament, placing high enough in regional tournaments that doubled as qualifying tournaments for the event or by automatic qualification by hosting the tournament.

Round 1
Group 1		Group 2	
Canada	6th, 2010 Pan American Qualifying Tournament	Australia	Oceania qualifier
Chinese Taipei	Asian qualifier	Cuba	2010 Pan American Qualifying Tournament
Greece	4th, 2010 European Championship	Dominican Republic	2010 Pan American Qualifying Tournament
Japan	Asian qualifier	Germany	2010 European Championship
Netherlands	2010 European Championship	Italy	2010 European Championship
Panama	Host nation	Nicaragua	8th, 2010 Pan American Qualifying Tournament
Puerto Rico	7th, 2010 Pan American Qualifying Tournament	South Korea	Asian qualifier
United States	2010 Pan American Qualifying Tournament	Venezuela	2010 Pan American Qualifying Tournament

== Format ==
The 16 participating teams were divided into two round robin pools, the top four of each pool advancing to the second round, in which each qualified team played each of the qualified teams from the other pool. The top two teams in the standings after the second round then qualified for the championship final.

=== Tie-breaking rules ===
Standings were determined by the win–loss records over all games played within a pool. In case of a tie, the order of the teams tied was determined by, in this sequence, (a) the win–loss record of the games played among the tied teams (=head-to-head HTH), (b) the highest difference between the ratios of runs scored per offensive innings and runs allowed per defensive innings (=Team's Quality Balance TQB), (c) the highest difference between the ratios of earned runs scored per offensive innings and earned runs allowed per defensive innings (ERTQB), (d) the highest batting average in the games played among the tied teams, (e) a coin flip.

== Venues ==
Panama City was the primary city for the event, and also the host of Group 1, while Aguadulce, Coclé; Santiago de Veraguas; and Chitré, Herrera Province were host to Group 2.

== Conditions ==
The tournament was marred by inclement weather, causing a number of rainout games that had to be made up, increasing the pressure on the tournament schedule. In the end, eleven of the sixteen second-round games needed to be played within two days, requiring teams to play doubleheaders of games shortened to seven innings, and the bronze medal game in the final round had to be canceled to allow the final to be played.

== Round 1 ==
=== Group 1 ===
==== Standings ====
Teams	W	L	Pct.	GB	R	RA	HTH
Canada	6	1	.857	—	42	21	1-0
Netherlands	6	1	.857	—	49	16	0-1
Panama	5	2	.714	1	47	30	
United States	4	3	.571	2	40	25	
Puerto Rico	3	4	.429	3	28	26	
Japan	2	5	.286	4	20	32	1-0
Chinese Taipei	2	5	.286	4	29	39	0-1
Greece	0	7	.000	6	10	76	

==== Schedule and results ====
October 1, 2011	Panama	8 – 3	Greece	Rod Carew Stadium, Panama City; Attendance: 20,000
October 1, 2011		Boxscore		Rod Carew Stadium, Panama City; Attendance: 20,000

October 2, 2011	Puerto Rico	1 – 9	Canada	Rod Carew Stadium, Panama City; Attendance: 500
October 2, 2011		Boxscore		Rod Carew Stadium, Panama City; Attendance: 500

October 2, 2011	Netherlands	2 – 1	Chinese Taipei	Remón Cantera Stadium, Aguadulce; Attendance: 2,000
October 2, 2011		Boxscore		Remón Cantera Stadium, Aguadulce; Attendance: 2,000

October 2, 2011	Japan	Rainout	United States	Rod Carew Stadium, Panama City

October 3, 2011	Canada	3 – 1	Japan	Rod Carew Stadium, Panama City; Attendance: 1,000
October 3, 2011		Boxscore		Rod Carew Stadium, Panama City; Attendance: 1,000

October 3, 2011	Netherlands	19 – 0 (F/5)	Greece	Remón Cantera Stadium, Aguadulce; Attendance: 122
October 3, 2011		Boxscore		Remón Cantera Stadium, Aguadulce; Attendance: 122

October 3, 2011	United States	4 – 8 (F/10)	Puerto Rico	Rod Carew Stadium, Panama City; Attendance: 500
October 3, 2011		Boxscore		Rod Carew Stadium, Panama City; Attendance: 500

October 3, 2011	Chinese Taipei	8 – 14	Panama	Remón Cantera Stadium, Aguadulce; Attendance: 3,000
October 3, 2011		Boxscore		Remón Cantera Stadium, Aguadulce; Attendance: 3,000

October 4, 2011	Japan	2 – 5	Netherlands	Rod Carew Stadium, Panama City; Attendance: 1,200
October 4, 2011		Boxscore		Rod Carew Stadium, Panama City; Attendance: 1,200

October 4, 2011	Greece	2 – 12	Canada	Remón Cantera Stadium, Aguadulce; Attendance: 500
October 4, 2011		Boxscore		Remón Cantera Stadium, Aguadulce; Attendance: 500

October 4, 2011	Panama	4 – 2	Puerto Rico	Rod Carew Stadium, Panama City; Attendance: 6,000
October 4, 2011		Boxscore		Rod Carew Stadium, Panama City; Attendance: 6,000

October 4, 2011	Chinese Taipei	1 – 15 (F/7)	United States	Remón Cantera Stadium, Aguadulce; Attendance: 1,700
October 4, 2011		Boxscore		Remón Cantera Stadium, Aguadulce; Attendance: 1,700

October 5, 2011	Japan	3 – 7	United States	Rod Carew Stadium, Panama City; Attendance: 2,500
October 5, 2011		Boxscore		Rod Carew Stadium, Panama City; Attendance: 2,500

October 6, 2011	Netherlands	5 – 0	Puerto Rico	Rod Carew Stadium, Panama City; Attendance: 1,000
October 6, 2011		Boxscore		Rod Carew Stadium, Panama City; Attendance: 1,000

October 6, 2011	United States	3 – 0	Greece	Remón Cantera Stadium, Aguadulce; Attendance: 200
October 6, 2011		Boxscore		Remón Cantera Stadium, Aguadulce; Attendance: 200

October 6, 2011	Japan	2 – 6	Panama	Rod Carew Stadium, Panama City; Attendance: 7,003
October 6, 2011		Boxscore		Rod Carew Stadium, Panama City; Attendance: 7,003

October 6, 2011	Canada	4 – 0	Chinese Taipei	Remón Cantera Stadium, Aguadulce; Attendance: 700
October 6, 2011		Boxscore		Remón Cantera Stadium, Aguadulce; Attendance: 700

October 7, 2011	Japan	3 – 1	Chinese Taipei	Rod Carew Stadium, Panama City; Attendance: 600
October 7, 2011		Boxscore		Rod Carew Stadium, Panama City; Attendance: 600

October 7, 2011	Puerto Rico	10 – 1	Greece	Remón Cantera Stadium, Aguadulce; Attendance: 1,203
October 7, 2011		Boxscore		Remón Cantera Stadium, Aguadulce; Attendance: 1,203

October 7, 2011	Canada	3 – 12	Panama	Rod Carew Stadium, Panama City; Attendance: 7,500
October 7, 2011		Boxscore		Rod Carew Stadium, Panama City; Attendance: 7,500

October 7, 2011	United States	5 – 7	Netherlands	Remón Cantera Stadium, Aguadulce; Attendance: 2,600
October 7, 2011		Boxscore		Remón Cantera Stadium, Aguadulce; Attendance: 2,600

October 8, 2011	Netherlands	4 – 5 (F/11)	Canada	Rod Carew Stadium, Panama City; Attendance: 700
October 8, 2011		Boxscore		Rod Carew Stadium, Panama City; Attendance: 700

October 8, 2011	Greece	Rainout	Chinese Taipei	Remón Cantera Stadium, Aguadulce

October 8, 2011	Panama	Rainout	United States	Rod Carew Stadium, Panama City

October 8, 2011	Puerto Rico	6 – 0	Japan	Remón Cantera Stadium, Aguadulce; Attendance: 2,500
October 8, 2011		Boxscore		Remón Cantera Stadium, Aguadulce; Attendance: 2,500

October 9, 2011	United States	1 – 6	Canada	Rod Carew Stadium, Panama City; Attendance: 2,000
October 9, 2011		Boxscore		Rod Carew Stadium, Panama City; Attendance: 2,000

October 9, 2011	Greece	4 – 9	Japan	Remón Cantera Stadium, Aguadulce; Attendance: 500
October 9, 2011		Boxscore		Remón Cantera Stadium, Aguadulce; Attendance: 500

October 9, 2011	Panama	3 – 7	Netherlands	Rod Carew Stadium, Panama City; Attendance: 7,500
October 9, 2011		Boxscore		Rod Carew Stadium, Panama City; Attendance: 7,500

October 9, 2011	Chinese Taipei	3 – 1	Puerto Rico	Remón Cantera Stadium, Aguadulce; Attendance: 1,300
October 9, 2011		Boxscore		Remón Cantera Stadium, Aguadulce; Attendance: 1,300

October 10, 2011	Greece	0 – 15 (F/6)	Chinese Taipei	Remón Cantera Stadium, Aguadulce; Attendance: 200
October 10, 2011		Boxscore		Remón Cantera Stadium, Aguadulce; Attendance: 200

October 10, 2011	Panama	0 – 5	United States	Rod Carew Stadium, Panama City; Attendance: 4,000
October 10, 2011		Boxscore		Rod Carew Stadium, Panama City; Attendance: 4,000

=== Group 2 ===
==== Standings ====
Teams	W	L	Pct.	GB	R	RA	HTH
Cuba	7	0	1.000	—	54	6	
Venezuela	5	2	.714	2	35	49	1-0
South Korea	5	2	.714	2	34	22	0-1
Australia	4	3	.571	3	39	47	
Dominican Republic	3	4	.429	4	52	28	1-0
Italy	3	4	.429	4	27	28	0-1
Nicaragua	1	6	.143	6	18	47	
Germany	0	7	.000	7	26	58	

==== Schedule and results ====
October 2, 2011	Australia	0 – 14 (F/7)	Cuba	Rico Cedeño Stadium, Chitré; Attendance: 2,000
October 2, 2011		Boxscore		Rico Cedeño Stadium, Chitré; Attendance: 2,000

October 2, 2011	Germany	4 – 5	Nicaragua	Omar Torrijos Stadium, Santiago de Veraguas; Attendance: 400
October 2, 2011		Boxscore		Omar Torrijos Stadium, Santiago de Veraguas; Attendance: 400

October 2, 2011	Venezuela	5 – 4	South Korea	Rico Cedeño Stadium, Chitré; Attendance: 4,000
October 2, 2011		Boxscore		Rico Cedeño Stadium, Chitré; Attendance: 4,000

October 2, 2011	Dominican Republic	7 – 0	Italy	Omar Torrijos Stadium, Santiago de Veraguas; Attendance: 300
October 2, 2011		Boxscore		Omar Torrijos Stadium, Santiago de Veraguas; Attendance: 300

October 3, 2011	Cuba	3 – 0	Dominican Republic	Rico Cedeño Stadium, Chitré; Attendance: 4,400
October 3, 2011		Boxscore		Rico Cedeño Stadium, Chitré; Attendance: 4,400

October 3, 2011	Italy	7 – 0	Australia	Omar Torrijos Stadium, Santiago de Veraguas; Attendance: 500
October 3, 2011		Boxscore		Omar Torrijos Stadium, Santiago de Veraguas; Attendance: 500

October 3, 2011	South Korea	6 – 5 (F/10)	Germany	Rico Cedeño Stadium, Chitré; Attendance: 800
October 3, 2011		Boxscore		Rico Cedeño Stadium, Chitré; Attendance: 800

October 3, 2011	Nicaragua	2 – 5	Venezuela	Omar Torrijos Stadium, Santiago de Veraguas; Attendance: 2,500
October 3, 2011		Boxscore		Omar Torrijos Stadium, Santiago de Veraguas; Attendance: 2,500

October 4, 2011	Italy	6 – 3	Nicaragua	Rico Cedeño Stadium, Chitré; Attendance: 250
October 4, 2011		Boxscore		Rico Cedeño Stadium, Chitré; Attendance: 250

October 4, 2011	Germany	2 – 13 (F/7)	Dominican Republic	Omar Torrijos Stadium, Santiago de Veraguas; Attendance: 268
October 4, 2011		Boxscore		Omar Torrijos Stadium, Santiago de Veraguas; Attendance: 268

October 4, 2011	South Korea	8 – 0	Australia	Rico Cedeño Stadium, Chitré; Attendance: 375
October 4, 2011		Boxscore		Rico Cedeño Stadium, Chitré; Attendance: 375

October 4, 2011	Cuba	14 – 2 (F/7)	Venezuela	Omar Torrijos Stadium, Santiago de Veraguas; Attendance: 4,800
October 4, 2011		Boxscore		Omar Torrijos Stadium, Santiago de Veraguas; Attendance: 4,800

October 6, 2011	Nicaragua	3 – 4	Australia	Rico Cedeño Stadium, Chitré; Attendance: 400
October 6, 2011		Boxscore		Rico Cedeño Stadium, Chitré; Attendance: 400

October 6, 2011	Venezuela	6 – 3	Dominican Republic	Omar Torrijos Stadium, Santiago de Veraguas; Attendance: 613
October 6, 2011		Boxscore		Omar Torrijos Stadium, Santiago de Veraguas; Attendance: 613

October 6, 2011	Italy	7 – 2	Germany	Rico Cedeño Stadium, Chitré; Attendance: 1,000
October 6, 2011		Boxscore		Rico Cedeño Stadium, Chitré; Attendance: 1,000

October 6, 2011	Cuba	4 – 1	South Korea	Omar Torrijos Stadium, Santiago de Veraguas; Attendance: 2,800
October 6, 2011		Boxscore		Omar Torrijos Stadium, Santiago de Veraguas; Attendance: 2,800

October 7, 2011	Germany	5 – 10	Venezuela	Rico Cedeño Stadium, Chitré; Attendance: 600
October 7, 2011		Boxscore		Rico Cedeño Stadium, Chitré; Attendance: 600

October 7, 2011	Dominican Republic	9 – 11(F/10)	Australia	Omar Torrijos Stadium, Santiago de Veraguas; Attendance: 450
October 7, 2011		Boxscore		Omar Torrijos Stadium, Santiago de Veraguas; Attendance: 450

October 7, 2011	Italy	1 – 5	Cuba	Rico Cedeño Stadium, Chitré; Attendance: 4,800
October 7, 2011		Boxscore		Rico Cedeño Stadium, Chitré; Attendance: 4,800

October 7, 2011	South Korea	6 – 4	Nicaragua	Omar Torrijos Stadium, Santiago de Veraguas; Attendance: 2,900
October 7, 2011		Boxscore		Omar Torrijos Stadium, Santiago de Veraguas; Attendance: 2,900

October 8, 2011	Australia	15 – 0 (F/5)	Venezuela	Rico Cedeño Stadium, Chitré; Attendance: 150
October 8, 2011		Boxscore		Rico Cedeño Stadium, Chitré; Attendance: 150

October 8, 2011	Cuba	8 – 2	Germany	Omar Torrijos Stadium, Santiago de Veraguas; Attendance: 4,375
October 8, 2011		Boxscore		Omar Torrijos Stadium, Santiago de Veraguas; Attendance: 4,375

October 8, 2011	South Korea	4 – 0	Italy	Rico Cedeño Stadium, Chitré; Attendance: 2,000
October 8, 2011		Boxscore		Rico Cedeño Stadium, Chitré; Attendance: 2,000

October 8, 2011	Dominican Republic	16 – 1 (F/6)	Nicaragua	Omar Torrijos Stadium, Santiago de Veraguas; Attendance: 5,500
October 8, 2011		Boxscore		Omar Torrijos Stadium, Santiago de Veraguas; Attendance: 5,500

October 9, 2011	Australia	9 – 6	Germany	Rico Cedeño Stadium, Chitré; Attendance: 300
October 9, 2011		Boxscore		Rico Cedeño Stadium, Chitré; Attendance: 300

October 9, 2011	Venezuela	7 – 6 (F/10)	Italy	Omar Torrijos Stadium, Santiago de Veraguas; Attendance: 1,500
October 9, 2011		Boxscore		Omar Torrijos Stadium, Santiago de Veraguas; Attendance: 1,500

October 9, 2011	Dominican Republic	4 – 5 (F/10)	South Korea	Rico Cedeño Stadium, Chitré; Attendance: 2,500
October 9, 2011		Boxscore		Rico Cedeño Stadium, Chitré; Attendance: 2,500

October 9, 2011	Nicaragua	0 – 6	Cuba	Omar Torrijos Stadium, Santiago de Veraguas; Attendance: 5,000
October 9, 2011		Boxscore		Omar Torrijos Stadium, Santiago de Veraguas; Attendance: 5,000

== Round 2 ==
=== Group 3 ===
==== Standings ====
Teams	W	L	Pct.	GB	R	RA	HTH
Netherlands	6	1	.857	—	41	18	1-0
Cuba	6	1	.857	—	56	18	0-1
Canada	4	3	.571	2	27	32	1-0
United States	4	3	.571	2	30	27	0-1
Australia	3	4	.429	3	29	30	
South Korea	2	5	.286	4	20	25	1-0
Panama	2	5	.286	4	36	35	0-1
Venezuela	1	6	.143	5	17	69	

==== Schedule and results ====
October 11, 2011	Netherlands	5 – 1	South Korea	Rico Cedeño Stadium, Chitré; Attendance: 500
October 11, 2011		Boxscore		Rico Cedeño Stadium, Chitré; Attendance: 500

October 11, 2011	Canada	0 – 7	Australia	Omar Torrijos Stadium, Santiago de Veraguas; Attendance: 250
October 11, 2011		Boxscore		Omar Torrijos Stadium, Santiago de Veraguas; Attendance: 250

October 11, 2011	Cuba	8 – 7	United States	Omar Torrijos Stadium, Santiago de Veraguas; Attendance: 1,700
October 11, 2011		Boxscore		Omar Torrijos Stadium, Santiago de Veraguas; Attendance: 1,700

October 11, 2011	Venezuela	4 – 11	Panama	Rico Cedeño Stadium, Chitré; Attendance: 5,200
October 11, 2011		Boxscore		Rico Cedeño Stadium, Chitré; Attendance: 5,200

October 12, 2011	Venezuela	Rainout	United States	Rico Cedeño Stadium, Chitré

October 12, 2011	Netherlands	1 – 1 (top/7, 2 on, 2 out); Rainout	Australia	Omar Torrijos Stadium, Santiago de Veraguas; Attendance: 700

October 12, 2011	Cuba	Rainout	Panama	Omar Torrijos Stadium, Santiago de Veraguas

October 12, 2011	Canada	Rainout	South Korea	Rico Cedeño Stadium, Chitré

October 13, 2011; 11h00	Canada	7 – 0 (F/7)	Venezuela	Remón Cantera Stadium, Aguadulce; Attendance: 50
October 13, 2011; 11h00		Boxscore		Remón Cantera Stadium, Aguadulce; Attendance: 50

October 13, 2011; 12h00	United States	2 – 1 (F/7)	Australia	Omar Torrijos Stadium, Santiago de Veraguas; Attendance: 500
October 13, 2011; 12h00		Boxscore		Omar Torrijos Stadium, Santiago de Veraguas; Attendance: 500

October 13, 2011; 15h30	Canada	4 – 0 (F/7)	South Korea	Remón Cantera Stadium, Aguadulce; Attendance: 600
October 13, 2011; 15h30		Boxscore		Remón Cantera Stadium, Aguadulce; Attendance: 600

October 13, 2011; 15h30	Netherlands	2 – 1 (completed from Oct 12)	Australia	Omar Torrijos Stadium, Santiago de Veraguas
October 13, 2011; 15h30		Boxscore		Omar Torrijos Stadium, Santiago de Veraguas

October 13, 2011; 19h30	Panama	4 – 5 (F/7)	South Korea	Remón Cantera Stadium, Aguadulce; Attendance: 2,000

October 13, 2011; 19h30	Cuba	1 – 4 (F/7)	Netherlands	Omar Torrijos Stadium, Santiago de Veraguas; Attendance: 1,500
October 13, 2011; 19h30		Boxscore		Omar Torrijos Stadium, Santiago de Veraguas; Attendance: 1,500

October 14, 2011; 11h00	South Korea	1 – 3 (F/7)	United States	Remón Cantera Stadium, Aguadulce; Attendance: 600
October 14, 2011; 11h00		Boxscore		Remón Cantera Stadium, Aguadulce; Attendance: 600

October 14, 2011; 11h00	Panama	4 – 5 (F/8)	Australia	Rod Carew Stadium, Panama City; Attendance: 100
October 14, 2011; 11h00		Boxscore		Rod Carew Stadium, Panama City; Attendance: 100

October 14, 2011; 15h30	Venezuela	4 – 7 (F/7)	United States	Remón Cantera Stadium, Aguadulce; Attendance: 150
October 14, 2011; 15h30		Boxscore		Remón Cantera Stadium, Aguadulce; Attendance: 150

October 14, 2011; 15h30	Canada	2 – 8 (F/7)	Cuba	Rod Carew Stadium, Panama City; Attendance: 1,000
October 14, 2011; 15h30		Boxscore		Rod Carew Stadium, Panama City; Attendance: 1,000

October 14, 2011; 19h30	Venezuela	2 – 12 (F/7)	Netherlands	Remón Cantera Stadium, Aguadulce; Attendance: 287
October 14, 2011; 19h30		Boxscore		Remón Cantera Stadium, Aguadulce; Attendance: 287

October 14, 2011; 19h30	Cuba	7 – 2 (F/7)	Panama	Rod Carew Stadium, Panama City; Attendance: 2,500
October 14, 2011; 19h30		Boxscore		Rod Carew Stadium, Panama City; Attendance: 2,500

== Final round ==
=== 7th place game ===
October 15, 2011	Panama	3 – 8	Venezuela	Omar Torrijos Stadium, Santiago de Veraguas; Attendance: 100
October 15, 2011		Boxscore		Omar Torrijos Stadium, Santiago de Veraguas; Attendance: 100

=== 5th place game ===
October 15, 2011	Australia	3 – 2	South Korea	Rico Cedeño Stadium, Chitré; Attendance: 225
October 15, 2011		Boxscore		Rico Cedeño Stadium, Chitré; Attendance: 225

=== Bronze medal game ===
October 15, 2011	Canada	Rainout	United States	Rod Carew Stadium, Panama City

=== Final ===
October 15, 2011	Netherlands	2 – 1	Cuba	Rod Carew Stadium, Panama City; Attendance: 4,500
October 15, 2011		Boxscore		Rod Carew Stadium, Panama City; Attendance: 4,500

== Final standings ==
Rk	Team	W	L	
1	Netherlands	11	1	Gold medal
Lost in the Final
2	Cuba	10	2	Silver medal
Failed to qualify for Final
3*	Canada	8	3	Bronze medal
4	United States	7	4	
Failed to qualify for Bronze medal game
5	Australia	7	5	
6	South Korea	6	6	
Failed to qualify for 5th place game
7	Venezuela	6	6	
8	Panama	6	6	
Failed to qualify for Round 2
Rk	Team	W	L	TQB
9	Dominican Republic	3	4	(52/59)−(28/58) = .398
10	Puerto Rico	3	4	(28/62)−(26/61) = .26
11	Italy	3	4	(27/61)−(28/62) = −.9
12	Japan	2	5	
13	Chinese Taipei	2	5	
14	Nicaragua	1	6	
15	Germany	0	7	(26/62)−(58/59) = −.564
16	Greece	0	7	(10/55)−(76/53) = −1.258

2011 Men's World champions

Netherlands
1st title

^{*}Canada awarded third place and bronze medal by rule C12 of the IBAF tournament rules, which states that the ordinary tie-breaking procedure applies in case of a rainout in the final round.

== Awards ==
The IBAF announced the following awards at the completion of the tournament.

All Star Team
Position	Player
Starting Pitcher	(South Korea) Oh Hyoun-Taek
Relief Pitcher	(Cuba) Yadier Pedroso
Catcher	(Panama) Dámaso Espino
First Base	(Cuba) José Dariel Abreu
Second Base	(United States) Joe Thurston
Third Base	(South Korea) Mo Chang-Min
Short Stop	(Canada) Jonathan Malo
Outfield	(Cuba) Rusney Castillo
Outfield	(Australia) Tom Brice
Outfield	(Panama) Conceptión Rodríguez
Designated Hitter	(Panama) Fernando Seguignol

Tournament Awards
Award	Player
MVP	(Netherlands) Curt Smith
Leading Batter	(Cuba) Rusney Castillo
Best ERA (Pitcher)	(Netherlands) Tom Stuifbergen
Best Win/Loss Average (Pitcher)	(Cuba) Miguel Lahera
Most Runs Batted In	(Netherlands) Curt Smith
Most Home Runs	(Venezuela) Wuillians Vasquez
Most Stolen Bases	(United States) Jordan Danks
Most Runs Scored	(Panama) José Macías
Outstanding Defensive Player	(Cuba) Yuliesky Gourriel
