= 2010 World University Baseball Championship =

Tournament details
- Country: Japan
- Dates: 30 July – 7 August
- Teams: 8
- Defending champions: United States

Final positions
- Champions: Cuba (2nd title)
- Runners-up: United States
- Third place: Japan
- Fourth place: South Korea

Tournament statistics
- Games played: 24
- Attendance: 41,050 (1,710 per game)

The 2010 World University Baseball Championship was an under-23 college baseball competition held at Meiji Jingu Stadium in Shinjuku, Yokohama Stadium in Naka-ku, Yokohama, Utsumi-Shimaoka Ballpark in Fuchū and KAIT Stadium in Atsugi, Japan from July 30 to August 7, 2010.

== Teams ==
The following 8 nations were represented at the tournament.

Group A	Group B
Canada	China
Chinese Taipei	Cuba
Sri Lanka	Japan
United States	South Korea

== First round ==
=== Group A ===
==== Standings ====
Teams	W	L	Pct.	GB	R	RA
United States	3	0	1.000	–	31	8
Canada	2	1	.667	1	22	10
Chinese Taipei	1	2	.333	2	25	11
Sri Lanka	0	3	.000	3	0	49

==== Schedule ====
July 30, 2010	Chinese Taipei	2 – 3	Canada	Meiji Jingu Stadium, Shinjuku, Tokyo; Attendance: 300
July 30, 2010		Boxscore		Meiji Jingu Stadium, Shinjuku, Tokyo; Attendance: 300

July 30, 2010	United States	15 – 0 (F/5)	Sri Lanka	Utsumi-Shimaoka Ballpark, Fuchū, Tokyo; Attendance: 50
July 30, 2010		Boxscore		Utsumi-Shimaoka Ballpark, Fuchū, Tokyo; Attendance: 50

July 31, 2010	Canada	18 – 0 (F/5)	Sri Lanka	Utsumi-Shimaoka Ballpark, Fuchū, Tokyo; Attendance: 140
July 31, 2010		Boxscore		Utsumi-Shimaoka Ballpark, Fuchū, Tokyo; Attendance: 140

August 1, 2010	United States	8 – 7 (F/11)	Chinese Taipei	Meiji Jingu Stadium, Shinjuku, Tokyo; Attendance: 300

August 2, 2010	Sri Lanka	0 – 16 (F/5)	Chinese Taipei	Yokohama Stadium, Naka-ku, Yokohama; Attendance: 100

August 2, 2010	Canada	1 – 8	United States	Yokohama Stadium, Naka-ku, Yokohama; Attendance: 500
August 2, 2010		Boxscore		Yokohama Stadium, Naka-ku, Yokohama; Attendance: 500

=== Group B ===
==== Standings ====
Teams	W	L	Pct.	GB	R	RA
Cuba	3	0	1.000	–	45	7
Japan	2	1	.667	1	26	12
South Korea	1	2	.333	2	13	26
China	0	3	.000	3	4	43

==== Schedule ====
July 30, 2010	Japan	4 – 0	South Korea	Meiji Jingu Stadium, Shinjuku, Tokyo; Attendance: 5,000
July 30, 2010		Boxscore		Meiji Jingu Stadium, Shinjuku, Tokyo; Attendance: 5,000

July 31, 2010	South Korea	0 – 18 (F/5)	Cuba	Meiji Jingu Stadium, Shinjuku, Tokyo; Attendance: 500
July 31, 2010		Boxscore		Meiji Jingu Stadium, Shinjuku, Tokyo; Attendance: 500

July 31, 2010	China	0 – 15 (F/6)	Japan	Meiji Jingu Stadium, Shinjuku, Tokyo; Attendance: 3,900
July 31, 2010		Boxscore		Meiji Jingu Stadium, Shinjuku, Tokyo; Attendance: 3,900

August 1, 2010	Japan	7 – 12	Cuba	Meiji Jingu Stadium, Shinjuku, Tokyo; Attendance: 8,000

August 1, 2010	South Korea	13 – 4	China	Utsumi-Shimaoka Ballpark, Fuchū, Tokyo; Attendance: 100

August 2, 2010	Cuba	15 – 0 (F/5)	China	KAIT Stadium, Atsugi, Kanagawa; Attendance: 460

== Finals ==
Quarterfinals
B1	Cuba	14
A4	Sri Lanka	0
A2	Canada	4
B3	South Korea	7
A1	United States	11
B4	China	0
B2	Japan	13
A3	Chinese Taipei	0

Semifinals
WQF3	Cuba	11
WQF2	South Korea	1
WQF1	United States	4
WQF4	Japan	2

Finals
WSF1	Cuba	4
WSF2	United States	3
Third place
LSF2	Japan	9
LSF1	South Korea	0

=== Quarterfinals ===
August 3, 2010	United States	11 – 0 (F/7)	China	Yokohama Stadium, Naka-ku, Yokohama; Attendance: 400

August 3, 2010	Canada	4 – 7	South Korea	KAIT Stadium, Atsugi, Kanagawa; Attendance: 320

August 4, 2010	Cuba	14 – 0 (F/7)	Sri Lanka	Yokohama Stadium, Naka-ku, Yokohama; Attendance: 500
August 4, 2010		Boxscore		Yokohama Stadium, Naka-ku, Yokohama; Attendance: 500

August 4, 2010	Japan	13 – 0 (F/7)	Chinese Taipei	Yokohama Stadium, Naka-ku, Yokohama; Attendance: 5,000
August 4, 2010		Boxscore		Yokohama Stadium, Naka-ku, Yokohama; Attendance: 5,000

=== Ranking deciders ===
August 4, 2010	China	3 – 17 (F/7)	Canada	KAIT Stadium, Atsugi, Kanagawa; Attendance: 110
August 4, 2010		Boxscore		KAIT Stadium, Atsugi, Kanagawa; Attendance: 110

August 5, 2010	Chinese Taipei	21 – 0 (F/5)	Sri Lanka	KAIT Stadium, Atsugi, Kanagawa; Attendance: 100

=== Semifinals ===
August 5, 2010	Cuba	11 – 1 (F/8)	South Korea	Yokohama Stadium, Naka-ku, Yokohama; Attendance: 1,500
August 5, 2010		Boxscore		Yokohama Stadium, Naka-ku, Yokohama; Attendance: 1,500

August 5, 2010	United States	4 – 2	Japan	Yokohama Stadium, Naka-ku, Yokohama; Attendance: 6,500

=== 7th place match ===
August 6, 2010	China	10 – 0 (F/8)	Sri Lanka	Utsumi-Shimaoka Ballpark, Fuchū, Tokyo; Attendance: 120

=== 5th place match ===
August 6, 2010	Chinese Taipei	14 – 15	Canada	Meiji Jingu Stadium, Shinjuku, Tokyo; Attendance: 50

=== Bronze medal match ===
August 7, 2010	Japan	9 – 0	South Korea	Meiji Jingu Stadium, Shinjuku, Tokyo; Attendance: 3,500

=== Gold medal match ===
August 7, 2010	Cuba	4 – 3 (F/10)	United States	Meiji Jingu Stadium, Shinjuku, Tokyo; Attendance: 4,000

== Final standings ==
Rk	Team	W	L
1st place, gold medalist(s)	Cuba	6	0
Lost in Final
2nd place, silver medalist(s)	United States	5	1
Failed to qualify for Final
3rd place, bronze medalist(s)	Japan	4	2
4	South Korea	2	4
Failed to qualify for the Semifinals
5	Canada	4	2
6	Chinese Taipei	2	4
Failed to qualify for the 5th place game
7	China	1	5
8	Sri Lanka	0	6

2010 World University Baseball champions

Cuba
2nd title

== See also ==
- 2010 World University Boxing Championship
- 2010 World University Rugby Sevens Championship
