= Gu (surname) =

Gu or Koo
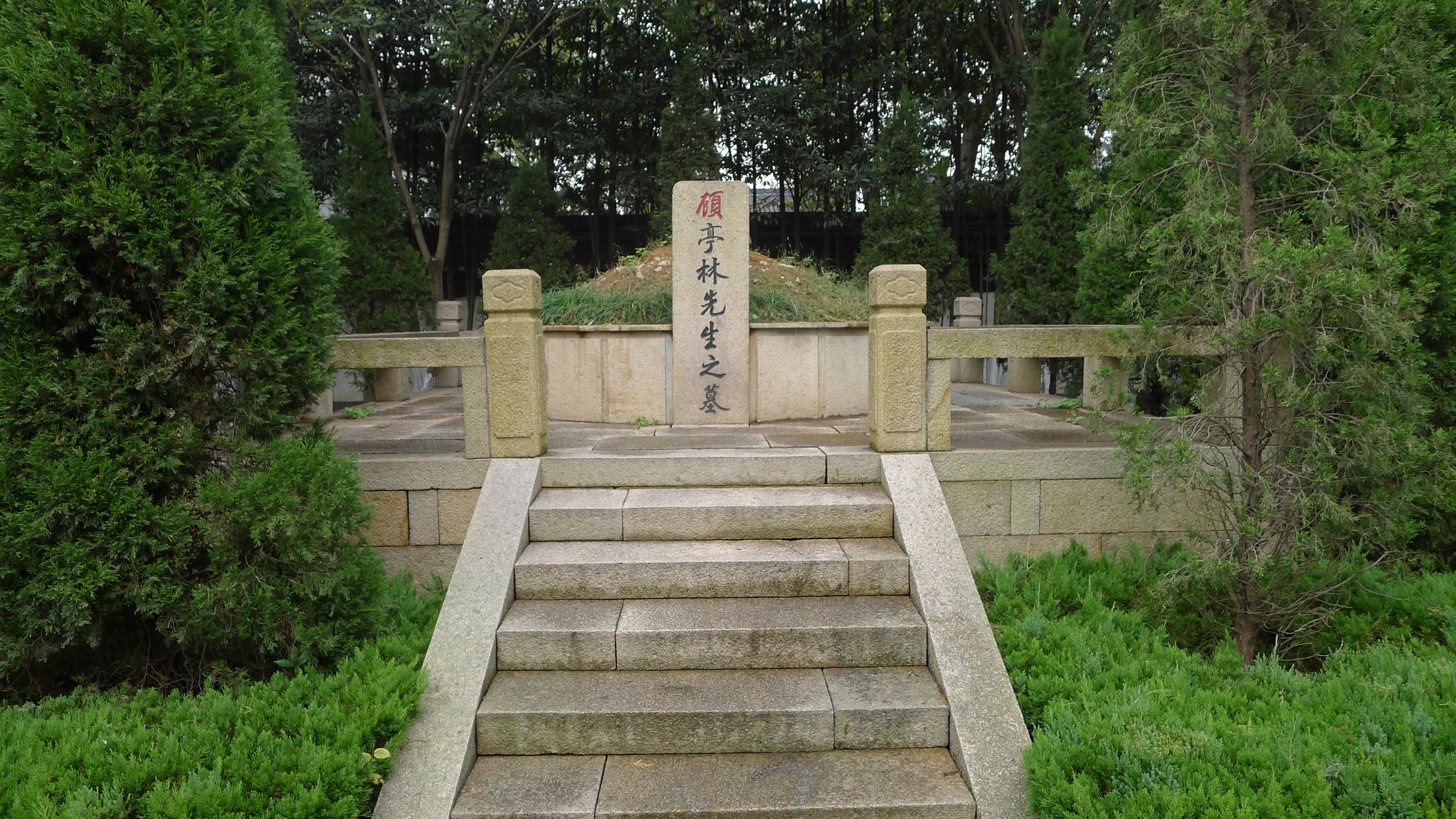
- The character 顧 is in red, from the tomb of Gu Yanwu
- Language: Chinese and Korean

Origin
- Region of origin: East Asia

Gu (simplified Chinese: 顾; traditional Chinese: 顧; pinyin: Gù) is an East Asian family name. In China, it is the 93rd name on the Hundred Family Surnames poem. Some places such as South Korea, and early immigrants from Wu-speaking region in China usually romanize this family name as Goo, Koo, or Ku.

The family name Gù (simplified Chinese: 顾; traditional Chinese: 顧; lit. 'to care for') is the most common pronounced "Gu", as well as the only one pronounced "Gù" (Mandarin 4th tone) and is ranked #88 on the list of top Chinese family names, according to the 2006 Chinese census (excluding Taiwan).

In South Korea, most people bearing the surname Gu (Korean: 구) use the hanja character 具 and 丘. The character 邱 and 仇 are also used although the latter two are less common.

== History ==
=== China ===
==== Northern lineage ====
The surname Gu (顾) descends from the kings of the first hereditary dynasty in China, Xia dynasty. A branch of the royal family was given a domain or a subsidiary kingdom with this name near the capital of Xia dynasty. On the way of taking over from Xia dynasty, the second dynasty, Shang dynasty, first attacked and annexed the subsidiary kingdom with this surname and another subsidiary kingdom named "Wei" (韦) of Xia dynasty. The survivors of the former subsidiary kingdom adopted the name and became the northern lineage of the family Gu.

==== Southern lineage ====
The founder king of Xia dynasty, Yu the Great, died in Kuaiji (会稽), nowadays Shaoxing, on his last imperial inspection tour, and was buried there (禹穴). During the reign of Xia dynasty, a branch of the royal family - which may or may not be the same branch of the subsidiary kingdom as mentioned above - was dispatched to Kuaiji to take care of the burial site of the founder king, Yu the Great, and memorial rites commemorating the king. This branch evolved into Yue Kingdom around or possibly before the Spring and Autumn period in the third dynasty Zhou dynasty, as unearthed second dynasty Shang dynasty oracle bone already contemporaneously indicates the presence of a domain or kingdom named Yue. An ancestor of the Gu family was the most famous king of this Yue Kingdom, Goujian. He was the last of the five Hegemons in the historic Spring and Autumn period, and had an incredibly beautiful sword unearthed in near mint condition several decades ago.

A second, southern lineage of the family Gu descends from this branch, although they technically did not obtain that name until the Han dynasty. The Southern lineage of Gu family makes up the majority of all those who bear the name today. A book of family tree was published.

The Gu family traces its origins to the Yue Kingdom, which was later destroyed around 306 BC in the third dynasty Zhou dynasty during the Warring States period and partitioned between Chu and Qi. At the beginning of the Han dynasty, the 7th generation descendant of King Goujian of Yue was named Yao, a regional warlord. He assisted the royal family of the Han dynasty in establishing the new dynasty. For his service, the Han emperor rewarded Yao with the title of "King of Eastern Sea". Yao later bestowed his own son the title of "Duke of Gu Yu". Thus his descendants proclaimed themselves the last name "Gu", and called "Gu Yao" as the 1st Ancestor of "Gu".

According to a 2002 article similar trace of that family was confirmed through historical archives.

== Distribution ==
This family name can be found mostly in eastern and southern Chinese provinces, especially in Jiangsu, Northern Zhejiang, and around the city of Shanghai, and is sometimes romanized as Koo. This surname can also be found in Korea, Vietnam and Indonesia.

== Notable people ==
=== China ===
- Gu Changsheng (1919–2015), Chinese scholar
- Gu Cheng (1956–1993), Chinese modern poet
- Gu Cheng (Eastern Wu), Chinese military general
- Gu Deng (1882–1947), Chinese mathematician and politician
- Gu Erniang (c. 1664–1730), Chinese inkstone artist
- Gu Fangzhou (1926–2019), Chinese virologist
- Gu Haiyan (born 1999), Chinese wheelchair fencer
- Gu Hengbo (1619–1664), Chinese Gējì, poet and painter
- Gu Hongzhong (937–975), Chinese painter
- Gu Hui (politician) (fl. 200s), Chinese official
- Gu Jiegang (1893–1980), Chinese folklorist, historian, and sinologist
- Gu Jingzhou (1915–1996), Chinese ceramic artist
- Joseph Gu, Chinese former senior pastor
- Gu Jun (born 1975), Chinese former badminton player
- Gu Kaizhi (c. 344–406), Chinese painter and politician
- Gu Kuang (c. 727–816), Chinese poet
- Matthias Gu Zheng (born 1937), Chinese Catholic priest
- Ku Meng-yu (1888–1972), Chinese politician
- Gu Ruzhang (1894–1952), Chinese martial artist
- Gu Shao (c. 188–218), Chinese official
- Gu Shunzhang (1903–1934), Chinese spymaster and defector
- Gu Tan (c. 205–246), Chinese official
- Gu Ti, Chinese official
- Wellington Koo (1888–1985), Chinese diplomat and statesman
- Gu Xingqing, Chinese interpreter and writer
- Gu Yanhui (d. 897), Chinese warlord
- Gu Yanwu (1613–1682), Chinese philologist, geographer, and scholar-official
- Gu Yong (168–243), Chinese calligrapher, musician, and politician
- Gu Yuan (born 1982), Chinese female hammer thrower
- Gu Yudong (1937–2025), Chinese surgeon and politician
- Gu Zhongchen (1860–1945), Chinese military leader and politician
- Gu Zhutong (1893–1987), Chinese military general

=== Korea ===
- Ku Bon-chan (born 1993), South Korean archer, Olympic gold medalist
- Gu Bon-gil (born 1989), South Korean fencer, Olympic gold medalist
- Koo Bon-hyeok (born 1998), South Korean footballer
- Koo Bon-moo (1945–2018), South Korean business executive
- Koo Bon-neung (born 1949), South Korean businessman
- Koo Bon-sang (born 1989), South Korean footballer
- Gu Bon-seung (born 1973), South Korean actor and singer
- Koo Bon-sik (born 1958), South Korean businessman
- Koo Cha-kyung (1925–2019), South Korean business executive
- Ku Chang-eun (born 1993), South Korean handball player
- Changmo (born Ku Chang-mo, 1994), South Korean rapper and producer
- Koo Chang-mo (born 1997), South Korean professional baseball player
- Esther Ku (born 1980), American actress and comedian
- Goo Hara (1991–2019), South Korean singer and actress
- Koo Hye-sun (born 1984), South Korean actress, singer-songwriter, director, artist
- Gu Hyeon-suk (born 1969), South Korean judoka
- Ku Hyo-jin (born 1985), South Korean former swimmer
- Ku Hyun-jun (born 1993), South Korean footballer
- Goo Hyun-sook, South Korean TV series writer
- Koo In-hwoi (1906–1969), South Korean businessman, the founder of LG Group
- Koo Ja-cheol (born 1989), South Korean footballer
- Koo Ja-sung (born 1992), South Korean actor and model
- Goo Jae-yee (born 1986), South Korean actress and model
- Koo Jeong-a (born 1967), South Korean mixed-media and installation artist
- Gu Jin-su (born 1968), South Korean field hockey player
- Koo Jun-hoe (born 1997), South Korean singer and actor
- Koo Jun-yup (born 1969), South Korean DJ and singer
- Ku Jung-seo (born 1936), South Korean literary critic
- Koo Ki-lan (born 1977), South Korean retired volleyball player
- Koo Kwang-mo (born, 1978), South Korean businessman
- Koo Kyo-hwan (born 1982), South Korean actor and film director
- Ku Kyung-hyun (born 1981), South Korean former footballer
- Ku Kyung-mi (born 1972), South Korean novelist
- Ku Ok-hee (1956–2013), South Korean professional golfer
- Ku Sang (1919–2004), South Korean poet
- Gu Sang-bum (born 1964), South Korean former footballer
- Koo Sang-min (born 1991), South Korean footballer
- Goo Seung-hyun (born 2004), South Korean actor
- Gu Sung-eun (born 1984), South Korean professional racing cyclist
- Gu Sung-yun (born 1994), South Korean professional footballer
- Ku Yong-jo (1955–2001), North Korean boxer, Olympic gold medalist
- Younghoe Koo (born 1994), South Korean-American football placekicker
- Koo Yun-cheol (born 1965), South Korean government official
- Goo Gunil (Xdinary Heroes) (born 1998), South Korean musician
