= Sung-hyun =

- Hangul: 성현
- RR: Seonghyeon
- MR: Sŏnghyŏn
- IPA: [sʌŋʝʌn]

Sung-hyun is a Korean given name. Sung-hyun was the fourth-most popular name for baby boys in South Korea in 1990.

People with this name include:

== Entertainers ==
- Mowg (composer) (born Lee Sung-hyun, 1972), South Korean male composer
- Andrew Choi (Korean name Choi Sung-hyun, born 1980), South Korean male singer
- Yoon Sung-hyun (born 1982), South Korean male film director and screenwriter
- Eru (singer) (born Jo Sung-hyun, 1983), South Korean male singer
- Baek Sung-hyun (born 1989), South Korean male actor
- Kevin Woo (Korean name Woo Sung-hyun, born 1991), American male singer based in South Korea
- Seonghyeon (born Eom Sung-hyun, 2009), South Korean singer and member of Cortis

== Sportspeople ==
- Park Sung-hyun (born 1983), South Korean female archer
- Kim Sung-hyun (baseball, born 1987) (born 1987), South Korean male baseball second baseman
- Ko Sung-hyun (born 1987), South Korean male badminton player
- Kim Seong-hyun (born 1989), South Korean male baseball pitcher
- Kyung Sung-hyun (born 1990), South Korean male alpine skier
- Shin Seong-hyun (born 1990), South Korean male baseball infielder
- Lee Sung-hyun (born 1991), South Korean male kickboxer
- Moon Sung-hyun (baseball) (born 1991), South Korean male baseball pitcher
- Kim Sung-hyun (footballer) (born 1993), South Korean male football defender
- Park Sung-hyun (born 1993), South Korean female golfer

== Other ==
- Moon Sung-hyun (born 1952), South Korean male politician, founding member of the Democratic Labor Party
- JJonak (born Bang Seong-hyun, c. 2000), South Korean male Overwatch player
- Sunghyun Cho, South Korean electrical engineer
- Andrew Kim (Korean name Kim Sung-hyun), South Korean-born American intelligence officer

== See also ==
- List of Korean given names
