= Kim Seong-hyeon =

Kim Seong-hyeon could refer to:

- Kim Seong-hyeon (golfer) (born 1998), South Korean golfer
- Kim Sung-hyun (baseball, born 1987), South Korean baseball player
- Kim Sung-hyun (field hockey)
- Kim Seong-hyun (born 1989), South Korean baseball player
- Kim Sung-hyun, known as Andrew Kim, Korean-American intelligence official
- Kim Sung-hyun (footballer) (born 1993), South Korean footballer
