= 2012 KBO match fixing scandal =

Scandal in South Korean baseball

The 2012 South Korean professional baseball match-fixing scandal was the first match-fixing scandal in the history of the KBO League. The scandal came to light in 2012 after a broker implicated in the 2011 K League match-fixing scandal and the V-League match-fixing scandal revealed that match-fixing had also occurred in professional baseball. As allegations spread, several players came under suspicion, and pitchers Moon Sung-hyun, Park hyun-joon, and Kim Sung-hyun were summoned by prosecutors for questioning. Among them, Park Hyun-joon and Kim Sung-hyun were found guilty of match-fixing-related offenses and were subsequently indicted. The KBO permanently expelled both players from professional baseball.

== Background ==
=== Allegations ===
Following the exposure of the 2011 K League match-fixing scandal, concerns emerged that match-fixing—the practice of manipulating the course or outcome of a sporting event in exchange for money—had become widespread within South Korean professional sports. In February 2012, a separate match-fixing scandal was uncovered in the V-League, South Korea's professional volleyball league, further fueling suspicions that similar activities may have occurred in professional baseball and basketball. Although the structure of legal sports betting made match-fixing in baseball difficult, illegal betting websites offered wagering options that created opportunities for manipulation. Due to the nature of baseball, where altering the final result of a game is often more difficult than in other sports, illegal betting markets frequently accepted wagers on specific in-game events, such as whether a starting pitcher would issue a walk in the first inning. This enabled brokers to influence games by approaching individual pitchers rather than entire teams. Reports suggested that even ace pitchers from teams based in the Seoul metropolitan area were implicated.

On 13 February 2012, a broker who had previously been arrested for involvement in the K League match-fixing scandal disclosed during an investigation into the V-League scandal that match-fixing had also occurred in professional baseball and basketball, confirming long-standing suspicions within the baseball community. According to the broker, illegal betting operators exploited wagering categories such as "predicting the first walk of the game," which were not directly tied to the outcome of a match, making it easier to recruit starting pitchers and manipulate specific events during games.

Match-fixing in baseball was typically carried out through starting pitchers, whose participation and playing time were relatively predictable. Because the manipulated actions were often only loosely connected to the final result of the game, they attracted less attention than conventional forms of match-fixing. The broker reportedly disclosed the names of both the players and clubs involved, although those details were not publicly released by the media.

The broker alleged to have orchestrated the match-fixing scheme stated that two ace starting pitchers from Seoul-based KBO League clubs—either the Nexen Heroes, Doosan Bears, or LG Twins—had been involved. According to his testimony, the pitchers had been recruited during the 2011 season to intentionally issue walks in the first inning or throw a ball on the first pitch of a game. The broker reportedly worked alongside another broker and a former university baseball player from Daegu who had failed to reach the professional ranks. One of the recruited pitchers had reportedly attended the same high school as the former player, which facilitated contact between the parties. On 15 February, media reports cited prosecutorial testimony identifying the players as members of the LG Twins. As allegations spread throughout the KBO League, clubs conducting spring training overseas launched internal investigations. The Nexen Heroes, who were training in the United States, announced that pitcher Moon Sung-hyun had been approached by a broker involved in illegal betting operations but had rejected the proposal, providing the first public confirmation that an organized match-fixing network had attempted to recruit KBO League players. Meanwhile, a former KBO League All-Star claimed that organized crime groups had become involved in match-fixing and that both players and coaches were targeted for recruitment. The allegation was later determined to be false. Following reports linking the LG Twins to the scandal, general manager Baek Soon-gil traveled to Okinawa, Japan, where the club was holding its spring training camp, to investigate the allegations. Prior to his departure, Baek questioned players about possible involvement and contacted prosecutors regarding the reports, later stating that the allegations lacked factual basis. The atmosphere at the LG Twins' training camp reportedly became subdued after extensive media coverage of the scandal began on 15 February. The club repeatedly stated that interviews with players had uncovered no evidence of match-fixing and pledged full cooperation with prosecutors. The Doosan Bears also announced that their internal investigation had found no evidence of match-fixing. The Lotte Giants and Hanwha Eagles similarly stated that their own reviews had not identified any players involved in the scandal.

Managers of KBO League clubs participating in spring training expressed skepticism regarding the allegations, noting that intentionally issuing a walk is difficult even for professional pitchers and that they had never suspected their players of deliberately doing so. Nevertheless, they agreed that any proven instances of match-fixing should be dealt with severely. The KBO sought to dispel unfounded rumors by requesting a police investigation into an individual who had falsely claimed to be a former professional baseball player while providing fabricated information to media outlets. The individual had alleged that organized crime groups were involved and that players manipulated games through intentional errors, but suspicions arose when he spoke in a regional dialect inconsistent with the background of the retired player he claimed to be. The allegations were subsequently proven false. KIA Tigers pitcher Yoon Suk-min indirectly denied any involvement in match-fixing through a message posted on Twitter, attempting to reassure fans amid growing speculation. The Daegu District Prosecutors' Office, which was investigating the V-League match-fixing scandal, stated that most media reports regarding baseball were based on rumors rather than verified testimony and that it had no plans to expand its investigation without concrete evidence. The KBO welcomed the prosecutors' position while emphasizing that preventive measures would continue and that severe penalties would be imposed if match-fixing were confirmed. The Korea Professional Baseball Players Association likewise criticized speculative reporting but called for a thorough investigation to determine the truth behind the allegations.

Although the names of the suspected players had not been officially disclosed, South Korean internet users widely speculated that the LG Twins players involved were Park hyun-joon and Kim Sung-hyun. Their names, along with that of Moon Sung-hyun, who was reported to have rejected a match-fixing proposal, became among the most searched terms on major internet portals. Subsequently, media outlets began reporting Park Hyun-joon's name and suggesting that he would be summoned for questioning by prosecutors. Reports indicated that investigators had secured testimony alleging his involvement in intentionally issuing first-inning walks. Park, who had served as the LG Twins' ace pitcher during the 2011 season, ranked fifth in the league in first-inning walks. However, while participating in spring training in Okinawa, he denied all allegations. Some observers also argued that his inconsistent control made it difficult to determine whether any walks had been intentional. Park further stated that he had never been contacted by brokers, while the LG Twins maintained that interviews with him provided no evidence of wrongdoing. Afterward, Park avoided contact with the media and declined to comment further on the allegations. Kim Sung-hyun, another player under suspicion, also denied involvement during interviews with both club officials and the media, explaining that he had historically performed poorly in first innings.

As speculation continued, opinions within the baseball community remained divided. While some considered the allegations implausible, others argued that any proven match-fixing should be punished severely. Many also urged the media to refrain from speculative reporting. Active KBO umpires stated that they had never noticed signs of match-fixing and expressed surprise at the allegations. One umpire remarked that there had not even been rumors within the sport, though he agreed that any confirmed misconduct should be punished harshly. The Ilguhoe, an organization composed primarily of retired KBO League players, criticized the media's speculative coverage and expressed concern that reports were focusing on game manipulation that did not necessarily affect final outcomes. Nevertheless, it urged prosecutors to continue investigating and eradicate the practice. Some observers, however, argued that launching investigations solely on the basis of rumors was inappropriate. The Daegu District Prosecutors' Office, which was responsible for investigating match-fixing in South Korean professional sports, reiterated that it would not establish a dedicated baseball investigation team and dismissed reports that Park Hyun-joon would be summoned, stating that players could not be questioned solely on the basis of rumors.

== Investigation begins ==
On 16 February 2012, as several cases of match-fixing in professional volleyball were confirmed, suspicions surrounding the KBO League intensified. Prosecutors at the Daegu District Prosecutors' Office also secured testimony from a broker who claimed to have paid Park hyun-joon and Kim Sung-hyun several million won in exchange for intentionally issuing first-inning walks. Based on this testimony, prosecutors launched a formal investigation into the allegations. Initially, only Park and Kim were targeted for investigation and were expected to be summoned for questioning. However, as additional reports emerged regarding attempts to recruit players for match-fixing schemes, the possibility grew that the investigation would expand to encompass the entire KBO League. It was also reported that Moon Sung-hyun, who had stated that he had received a match-fixing proposal, would be summoned as a witness.

Based on the broker's testimony, prosecutors examined financial transactions, mobile phone records, and text messages involving players suspected of participating in match-fixing before determining when to summon them for questioning. At the same time, investigators decided to broaden their inquiry into brokers operating across various professional sports leagues. Prosecutors also requested cooperation from the KBO, including access to game records and other materials relevant to the investigation. Prosecutors planned to summon Park Hyun-joon and Moon Sung-hyun, who were participating in spring training in Japan, before the completion of their training camps. Kim Sung-hyun, who was training in South Korea, was also ordered to appear for questioning. After obtaining testimony indicating that two brokers previously implicated in the 2011 K League match-fixing scandal had also become involved in baseball, prosecutors expanded their investigation to additional clubs and players, believing that a greater number of players may have been approached than initially suspected. Furthermore, after conducting internal investigations, three clubs informed prosecutors that some of their players had received match-fixing proposals but had rejected them, suggesting that attempts to manipulate games had been widespread. One broker, identified only by his surname Kang, allegedly used connections within the entertainment industry to recruit players. Investigators also uncovered evidence of financial transactions between the broker and a well-known entertainer, indicating that the scandal had extended beyond sports into the entertainment industry.

As the investigation expanded beyond the KBO League and concerns about match-fixing spread throughout South Korean professional sports, the South Korean government intervened on 21 February and announced measures aimed at eradicating corruption in sports. During a joint meeting chaired by Minister of Culture, Sports and Tourism Choi Kwang-shik and attended by the heads of major professional sports organizations, including KBO Commissioner Koo Bon-neung, officials adopted a zero-tolerance policy toward athletes found guilty of manipulating games. They also agreed to improve player welfare to reduce susceptibility to match-fixing schemes and to strengthen monitoring of illegal sports gambling websites.

== Investigation and arrests ==
On 28 February, the Daegu District Prosecutors' Office arrested LG Twins infielder Kim Sung-hyun on charges of violating the National Sports Promotion Act. Kim was questioned for approximately eight hours regarding allegations that, while playing for the Nexen Heroes during the 2011 season, he had conspired with brokers on two occasions in April and May to intentionally issue the first walk of the game in the first inning and had received 10 million won in return. Prosecutors stated that Kim admitted to most of the allegations when confronted with evidence regarding financial transactions involving a broker who had attended the same high school and later played college baseball. On 29 February, prosecutors requested an arrest warrant for Kim on charges related to match-fixing. On 1 March, the Daegu District Court issued the warrant, citing concerns that he might destroy evidence or flee, and Kim was formally detained. Kim's attorney acknowledged his involvement in match-fixing but claimed that, after a failed attempt to manipulate a game, Kim had been subjected to threats and extortion by brokers and had paid them approximately 30 million won, including money from his housing deposit.

On 28 February, the KBO placed both Kim Sung-hyun, who was under investigation, and Park Hyun-joon, who was strongly suspected of involvement, on the restricted list and prohibited them from participating in games pending judicial proceedings. The KBO also convened an emergency executive meeting chaired by Secretary General Yang Hae-young and declared that severe disciplinary measures would be imposed if the allegations were proven true.

On 29 February, Nexen Heroes pitcher Moon Sung-hyun temporarily returned from the team's spring training camp in Kagoshima, Japan, and appeared before prosecutors as a witness. After questioning, he was released without further action and returned to Kagoshima on 2 March to resume team training.

Also on 29 February, LG Twins pitcher Park Hyun-joon returned from spring training in Okinawa, Japan, to appear before prosecutors. Upon arrival, he maintained his innocence and appeared confident, even smiling in front of reporters. On 2 March, Park was questioned by prosecutors for approximately eight hours and participated in a confrontation with broker Kim and fellow player Kim Sung-hyun. During the investigation, however, Park admitted that he had accepted a proposal from the broker and had participated in match-fixing on two occasions in August 2011, receiving between 2 and 3 million won per game. After Park acknowledged a substantial portion of the allegations, prosecutors announced that they would continue the investigation while leaving him at liberty and later seek an indictment.

== Investigation Closure and Verdict ==
After the allegations against Kim Sung-hyun and Park Hyun-joon were confirmed, the Daegu District Prosecutors’ Office stated that it had no plans to expand the investigation and continued focusing on the two players who had admitted to the charges. As public opinion questioned whether the investigation was being rushed to conclude before the start of the KBO League season, prosecutors announced on 8 February that they would release the results of the investigation one week later, adding that the scope could be expanded if additional evidence of match-fixing was discovered, thereby easing the controversy.

Meanwhile, both the KBO League organization and LG Twins—where the two players had been registered—issued public apologies on their official websites. On 6 March, LG Twins decided to release Kim Sung-hyun and Park Hyun-joon, and stated that they would request lifetime bans from the KBO depending on the final judicial outcome, in an effort to manage the situation. On 7 March, Nexen Heroes, the former team of Kim Sung-hyun at the time of the alleged offenses, also published an official apology on its website.

On 14 March, the Daegu District Prosecutors’ Office announced the results of its investigation into the professional sports match-fixing scandal. Kim Sung-hyun was indicted and detained on charges of violating the National Sports Promotion Act due to risk of flight, while Park Hyun-joon was indicted without detention. Kim was found to have manipulated three games and received 7 million won, while Park was found to have participated in match-fixing on two occasions and received 5 million won.

Even after the announcement of the investigation results, the two players’ sides continued to dispute the findings. Park Hyun-joon's side claimed that after initially failing in an earlier attempt at match-fixing and being pressured by brokers who had lost money through Kim Sung-hyun, Park voluntarily approached the brokers and agreed to participate. They further alleged that on 24 May, Park intentionally issued a first-inning walk in a game against the Doosan Bears and received 5 million won three days later, which he allegedly handed to Kim Sung-hyun, although Kim's family denied receiving any money. Kim Sung-hyun, however, denied receiving any funds, and prosecutors noted inconsistencies between Park's statements and those of the brokers, indirectly lending support to Kim's version of events.

On 29 March, prosecutors sought sentences of 10 months in prison and a 7 million won fine for Kim Sung-hyun, and 6 months in prison and a 5 million won fine for Park Hyun-joon.

On 18 April, the Daegu District Court delivered its verdict, finding both players guilty. Both Kim and Park received suspended sentences of six months in prison with two years of probation, along with 120 hours of community service, thereby avoiding actual imprisonment. The court also imposed fines of 7 million won on Kim and 5 million won on Park. The KBO subsequently imposed lifetime bans on both players for violating league regulations, permanently prohibiting them from participating in any professional or amateur games under the KBO umbrella.

== Impact ==
LG Twins, the team of the permanently banned players Kim Sung-hyun and Park hyun-joon, finished the 2012 season in 7th place despite a strong start. Although expectations had been low—some analysts had predicted a last-place finish—the team performed relatively well early in the season, but failed to replace the contributions of Park Hyun-joon, who had recorded 13 wins in the 2011 season, resulting in their 10th consecutive failure to reach the postseason. As players once believed to be innocent were revealed to have been involved in criminal activity, fan interest initially declined and concerns grew over whether the league would surpass 7 million total spectators. However, contrary to expectations, exhibition games drew strong attendance, reflecting continued popularity. In the opening two-game exhibition series, a total of 101,351 spectators attended across four stadiums, and on 18 March, 57,508 spectators attended four venues in a single day, setting a record for preseason attendance. This outcome contradicted earlier predictions of poor attendance due to the scandal and was attributed to the relatively swift resolution of the investigation and the fact that only two players were ultimately implicated. It was also widely argued that the return of star players such as Park Chan-ho and Lee Seung-yuop from overseas leagues helped offset the negative impact of the scandal and contributed significantly to increased exhibition attendance. Indeed, the league later broke its all-time single-season attendance record, ultimately reaching 7,156,157 spectators, surpassing the pre-season target of 7 million, indicating that the impact of the match-fixing scandal on overall popularity was limited.
