= Moon Sung-hyun =

Moon Sung-hyun may refer to:

- Moon Sung-hyun (politician) (born 1952), South Korean politician
- Moon Sung-hyun (baseball) (born 1991), South Korean baseball player
- Moon Seong-hyun (born 2006), South Korean actor
