= Koo Bon-neung =

South Korean billionaire (born 1949)

- 구본능
- Born: March 26, 1949 (age 76); Busan, South Korea
- Education: Korea University
- Occupation: Businessman
- Employer: Heesung Group
- Children: 2 (son Koo Kwang-mo was adopted by his brother)
- Father: Koo Cha-kyung
- Family: Koo family

Korean name
- Hangul: 구본능
- RR: Gu Bonneung
- MR: Ku Ponnŭng

Koo Bon-neung (Korean: 구본능; born March 26, 1949) is a South Korean businessman. He is part of the Koo family of the chaebol LG and has served in various executive roles in the related company Heesung Group. He served as commissioner of the Korea Baseball Organization from 2011 to 2017.

He is among the richest people in South Korea. In April 2024, Forbes estimated his net worth at US$1.15 billion and ranked him the 30th richest person in the country.

== Biography ==
He was born on March 26, 1949, in Busan, South Korea. His grandfather was Koo In-hwoi, the founder of Lucky Goldstar Corporation (now LG), and his father Koo Cha-kyung. As a youth, he reportedly dreamed of becoming a baseball player; he gave up this dream at his father's insistence. He graduated from Kyungnam High School in 1967. He graduated from Korea University with a major in business administration in 1976.

He joined Lucky Goldstar in 1976. He served as head of its Chicago branch and overseas headquarters. In 1987, he became director of Goldstar (now LG Electronics). He became auditor of Heesung Metals in 1988, vice president of Sangnong Enterprise (now LG affiliate Heesung Electronics) in 1990, and president of Heesung Metals in 1992. In 1996, Heesung Group split off of LG, and he became its head. By 2018, he owned 3.45% of LG Corporation stock.

He served as an advisor to the baseball team LG Twins. He became the 19th commissioner of the Korea Baseball Organization in 2011. He was unanimously reappointed to that role in 2015. He finished his term in 2017.

In 2019, he and some other members of his family were found not guilty of tax evasion.

== Personal life ==
He has 5 other siblings. Koo Bon-moo, his oldest brother, was chairman of LG. Koo Bon-joon is his younger brother. Koo Bon-sik (head of Heesung Electronics) is another younger brother. He has an older sister, Koo Hwon-mi (구훤미) and Koo Mi-jeong (구미정).

He was married to Kang Yeong-hye (강영혜) but she died in 1996. They had a son, Koo Kwang-mo, and daughter, Koo Yeon-seo (구연서), together. He remarried to Cha Gyeong-suk (차경숙) in 1998.

The family reportedly maintains male-line primogeniture. His older brother, Koo Kwang-mo, lacked an heir after his son died in a 1994 accident. Thus, Koo Bon-neung's son Koo Kwang-mo was adopted by Koo Bon-moo in 2004.
