= LG Energy Solution =

South Korean battery maker

LG Energy Solution, Ltd.
- Native name: 주식회사 엘지에너지솔루션
- Type: Public subsidiary
- Traded as: KRX: 373220
- Founded: December 1, 2020; 5 years ago
- Headquarters: Seoul, South Korea
- Key people: Kwon Young-soo (chairman)
- Products: Lithium-ion battery
- Parent: LG Chem (81%)
- Website: www.lgensol.com

LG Energy Solution Ltd. (LGES; Korean: 주식회사 엘지에너지솔루션) is a battery company headquartered in Seoul, South Korea. LGES is one of the largest battery makers in the world, with its product applications including electric vehicles and ESS.

== History ==
=== LG Chem Energy Solution Business Division (1992–2020) ===
LG Chem started a battery business after LG Group chairman Koo Bon-moo visited the United Kingdom Atomic Energy Authority office in 1992. After the visit, Koo brought rechargeable battery samples and began research into the emerging technology. LG Chem produced Korea's first lithium-ion battery in 1999 and began supplying automotive batteries for the Chevrolet Volt produced by General Motors in the late 2000s. Later, the company became a battery supplier to global car makers, including Ford, Chrysler, Audi, Renault, Volvo and SAIC Motor.

=== LG Energy Solution (2020–present) ===
In September 2020, LG Chem announced that it would spin off its battery business to cope with growing demand from global automotive manufacturers. LG Chem's battery business officially became a separate company and changed its name to LG Energy Solution Ltd. in December 2020. It subsequently undertook an IPO process to secure funds in order to increase its battery production capacity and debuted on the Korea Exchange in January 2022. It was South Korea's biggest IPO at that point. In the first half of 2025, LGES won three injunctions against Sunwoda for patent infringement. On 4 September 2025, United States Immigration and Customs Enforcement detained LG employees and contractors during a raid of Hyundai Motor Group Metaplant America.

== Partnerships ==
=== Joint Ventures ===
Name	Partner companies	Establishment date	Dissolution date	LG ownership share (%)	Initial investment (USD)	Ref.
Ultium Cells LLC	General Motors	December 2019		50	2.3 billion	
NextStar Energy	Stellantis	March 2022	February 2026	51	4.1 billion	
L-H Battery Company	Honda	January 2023		51	3.5 billion	
HL-GA BATTERY COMPANY	Hyundai Motor Company	May 2023		50	4.3 billion	
LG-HY BCM	Zhejiang Huayou Recycling Technology	August 2023				
LG-HY BCM	Toyota Tsusho	August 2023				
	Derichebourg	April 2025		50		
Green Metals Battery Innovations	Toyota Tsusho	June 2025		49		

=== Supply Agreements ===
Client	Agreement date	Deal value (USD)	Supply start date	Original contract duration/Supply end date	Termination date	Forecasted supply (GWh)	Ref.
Toyota	October 2023	~3 billion	2025			20	
Ampere (company)	July 2024		2025	5 years		39	
Aptera Motors	January 2025	499.2 million	2025	2031		4.4	
O&J Automotive Netherlands	June 2025	(Note: estimated 1 trillion won ($732 million))	2026	6 years		8	
Tesla, Inc.	July 2025	$4.3 billion	2026	2030			
Ford Motor Company	October 2024		2026	4-6 years	December 2025	109	
Mercedes-Benz Group	October 2024		2028	10 years		50.5	
Mercedes-Benz Group	September 2025		2028	2035		32	
Mercedes-Benz Group	September 2025		2029	2037		75	
Mercedes-Benz Group	December 2025	1.4 billion	2028	2035			

== Controversies ==
According to General Motors, manufacturing defects in batteries supplied for Chevrolet Bolt caused 13 confirmed battery fires. The faulty batteries were produced in LGES plants in South Korea and Michigan, and GM pursued reimbursement from LG. In the end, LGES and LG Electronics agreed to pay GM up to $1.9 billion for the recalls on every car produced since 2016.

== See also ==
- List of electric-vehicle-battery manufacturers
- 2025 Georgia Hyundai plant immigration raid
- Battery industry of South Korea
