= LG Chem =

South Korean chemical company

LG Chem Ltd.
- Logo used since 30 December 2014 (Note: The logo's symbol has been in use since 4 January 1995.)
- Formerly: Lucky Co., Ltd. (1947–1995)
- Type: Public
- Traded as: KRX: 051910; KRX: 051915
- Industry: Chemicals
- Founded: 2009; 17 years ago
- Headquarters: LG Twin Towers, 128, Yeoui-daero, Yeongdeungpo-gu, Seoul, South Korea
- Products: Raw materials; Chemicals; IT and electronics materials; Energy solutions
- Revenue: ▲KRW 51.865 trillion (2022)
- Operating income: 1,798,159,000 won (2020)
- Net income: ▲KRW 2.195 trillion (2022)
- Total assets: 41,388,894,000 won (2020)
- Owner: LG Corporation (33%)
- Number of employees: 20,000+ (2022)
- Subsidiaries: LG Energy Solution (81%)
- Website: LG Chem

LG Chem Ltd. (Korean: LG화학), often referred to as LG Chemical, is the largest Korean chemical company and is headquartered in Seoul, South Korea. It was the 9th largest chemical company in the world by sales in 2021. It was first established as the Lucky Chemical Industrial Corporation, which manufactured cosmetics. It is now solely a business-to-business company (consumer products division was spun off into LG Household & Health Care).

The company has eight factories in South Korea and a network of 29 business locations in 15 countries. This network includes a holding company in China, 14 overseas manufacturing subsidiaries, five marketing subsidiaries, seven representative offices, and two R&D centers. The Financial Times reported on 2 April 2017, that LG Chem would be expanding battery production in China. At the time, China accounted for one-third of the company's total sales. In April 2019, LG Chem sued rival SK Innovation for allegedly stealing trade secrets for manufacturing electric vehicle batteries.

== Business and product areas ==
=== Current ===
LG Chem has three main business areas:

- Petrochemicals
- Advanced materials
- Life sciences

==== Petrochemicals ====
LG Chem is a supplier of petrochemicals ranging from basic distillates to specialty polymers. For example, it is a large producer of common plastics such as acrylonitrile butadiene styrene (ABS), styrene-acrylonitrile resin (SAN), and polyvinyl chloride (PVC). It also produces raw materials and liquids, including plasticizers, specialty additives, alcohols, polyolefins, acrylic acid, synthetic rubber, styrenics, performance polymers, engineering plastics, elastomers, conductive resins, and other chemicals.

==== Advanced materials ====
LG Chem supplies display and optical films, polarizers, printed circuit materials, and toners. It also supplies LCD polarizers, which are multi-layer sheets of film applied to the top and bottom surfaces of TFT-LCD panels to transmit the light from the backlight unit through the panel, and 3D FPR (film-type patterned retarder) film, which enables three-dimensional viewing.

==== Life sciences ====
LG Chem acquired AVEO Pharmaceuticals, a U.S. bio firm focused on renal cell carcinoma, for US$571 million in 2023.

=== Former ===
==== Energy solutions ====
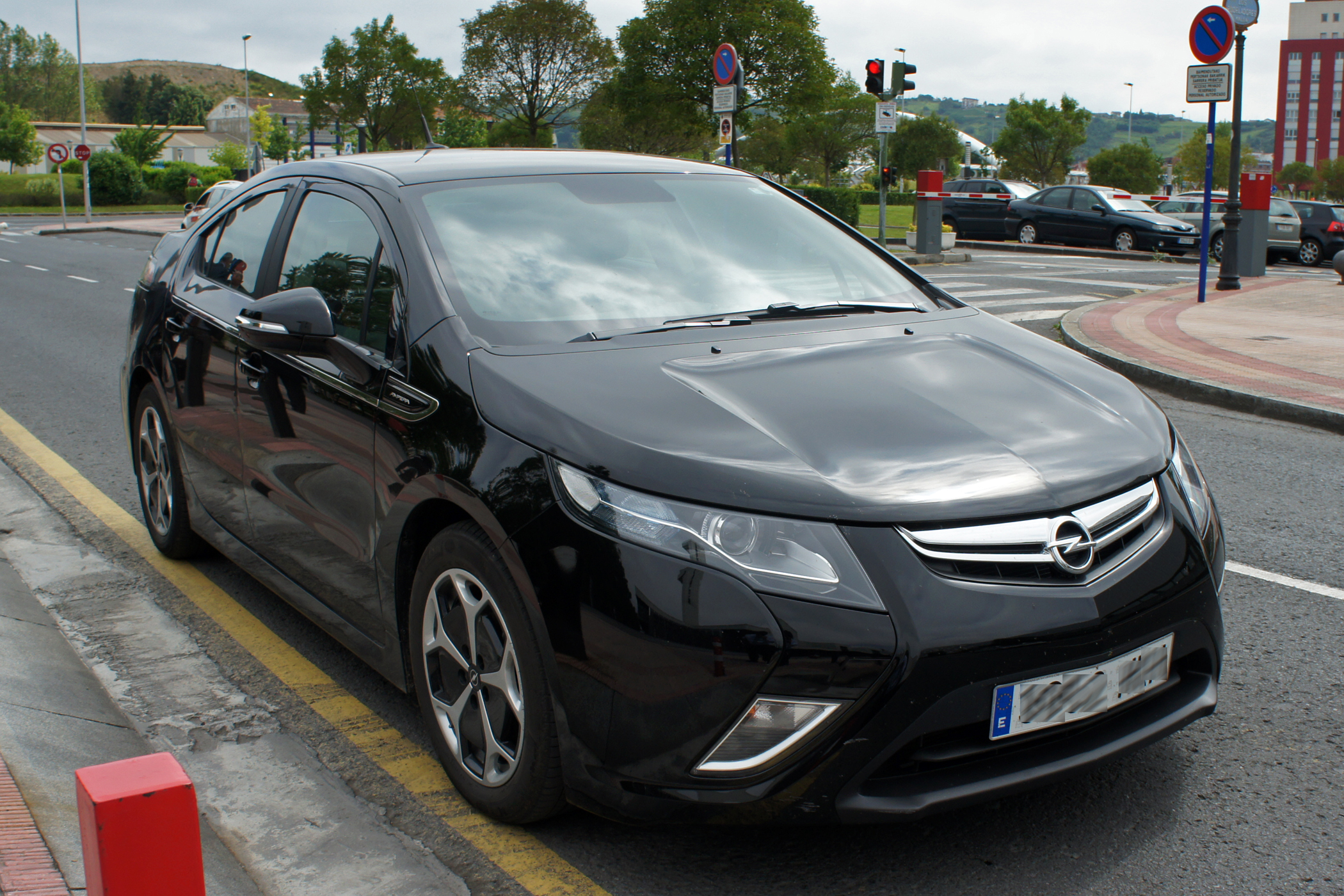
Chevrolet Volt, known as the Opel Ampera in Europe

LG Chem completed development and began mass production of Korea's first lithium-ion batteries back in 1999. At the end of 2011, LG Chem was the world's third-largest maker with an annual production capacity of 1 billion mobile battery and 20 million automotive battery cells. It is also a supplier of automotive battery for electric vehicles, such as the Ford Focus, Chevrolet Volt and Renault ZOE.

LG Chem Michigan is a wholly owned subsidiary of LG Chem based in Holland, Michigan which operates a plant to manufacture advanced battery cells for electric vehicles. The US$303 million Holland plant received 50% of its funding from U.S. Department of Energy matching stimulus funds, and started manufacturing battery systems in 2013. The plant can produce enough cells per year to build between 50,000 and 200,000 battery packs for electric cars and hybrids such as the Chevrolet Volt by General Motors, the Ford Focus Electric, and upcoming plug-in electric vehicles from other carmakers. Its research and development arm, called LG Chem Power, is based in nearby Troy, Michigan. LG Chem Power and LG Chem Michigan were originally one company called Compact Power, Inc.

Both the Chevrolet Volt and the Ford Focus Electric initially used cells manufactured in Korea by parent LG Chem and then later switched to cells produced in LG Chem Michigan's Holland plant once it opened.

In September 2020, LG Chem unveiled its plan to publicly list its energy division under the name of LG Energy Solution by December.

LG Chem said on 22 September 2024 that it plans to supply cathode materials to Prime Planet Energy & Solutions Inc. (PPES), a Japanese battery joint venture established between Toyota Motor Corp. and Panasonic Corp.

On 27 October 2024, LG Chem said Sunday it has opened its third overseas research and development center in Germany to develop environment-friendly, next-generation technologies.

== Accidents and incidents ==
=== Visakhapatnam gas leak ===
On 7 May 2020, a gas leak incident that took place at the LG Polymer plant at Gopalapatnam on the outskirts of Visakhapatnam resulted in the death of 12 people, hospitalization of over 300 and around thousands falling sick. Nearly 3000 people were evacuated from villages in five-kilometre radius of the plant. The gas reportedly started leaking around 2:30 am when the workers were preparing to reopen the plant after the lockdown ordered due COVID-19 pandemic was relaxed in the region.

=== Seosan plant explosion ===
On 19 May 2020, an alkylaluminum-based catalyst powder exploded due to high-pressure while being transported at the packing room of the LG Chem plant at Seosan. The explosion exposed the pyrophoric powder to the air, causing a fire. As a result, a 39-year-old researcher died and two more workers suffered second-degree burns.

== Past Officers ==
- Chairman & CEO
  - Koo In-hwoi (1966~1969)
  - Koo Cha-kyung (1970~1995)
  - Koo Bon-moo (1995~2001)
- Vice Chairman & CEO
  - Heo Sin-Gu (1988)
  - Seong Jae-Gap (1996~2001)
- President & CEO
  - Koo In-hwoi (1947~1965)
  - Koo Cheol-Hoe (1968~1970)
  - Bak Seung-Chan (1970~1971)
  - Heo Sin-Gu (1971~1980/1986~1988)
  - Koo Ja-Hak (1980~1986)
  - Choe Geun-Seon (1989~1994)
  - Lee Jeong-Seong (1989~1991)
  - Seong Jae-Gap (1994~1995)

== See also ==
- List of electric-vehicle-battery manufacturers
- VinFast
