= LG H&H =

South Korean personal care and cosmetics producer

LG H&H Co., Ltd.
- Logo used since December 30, 2014
- Native name: 주식회사 LG생활건강
- Romanized name: Jusikhoesa LG (El-Ji) Saenghwalgeongang
- Formerly: LG Household & Health Care
- Type: Public
- Traded as: KRX: 051900
- Industry: Consumer goods
- Predecessor: LG Chem
- Founded: April 2001; 25 years ago
- Headquarters: Seoul, South Korea
- Area served: Worldwide
- Key people: Suk Y. Cha (vice chairman and CEO)
- Products: Cosmetics; Household Goods; Beverages
- Revenue: KRW 4,677 billion (2014)
- Operating income: KRW 511 billion (2014)
- Net income: KRW 355 billion (2014)
- Total assets: KRW 3,828 billion (2014)
- Total equity: KRW 1,709 billion (2014)
- Owner: LG Corporation (34%)
- Number of employees: 9,566 (2014)
- Subsidiaries: The Face Shop
- Website: lgcare.com/global

LG H&H Co., Ltd., formerly LG Household & Health Care, is a major South Korean consumer goods company that manages cosmetics, household goods, and beverages business. It is also the South Korean bottler of the Coca-Cola system.

== Summary ==
=== History ===
Founded in 1947, Koo In-Hwoi (founder of LG Corp) established Lucky Chemical Industrial Corp, and launched Lucky Cream, the very first cosmetics product in Korea. In 1954, the company also launched Korea's first toothpaste brand, Lucky Toothpaste. In February 1995, the company changed its name to LG Chemical Ltd. In April 2001, LG Household & Health Care spun off from LG Chemical, and was listed on the Korea Stock Exchange. Since current CEO & Vice Chairman, Suk Y. Cha joined the company in 2005, the business made a successful turnaround, and the company's growth was further driven by strategic M&As. Currently, LG Household & Health Care is expanding its cosmetics and personal care business into global market.

=== M&A ===
When LG Household & Health Care was established, there were only two business divisions of cosmetics and household goods. With the acquisition of Coca-Cola Beverage (former Coca-Cola Korea Bottling Co., Ltd) in 2007, the company completed its current business structure of cosmetics, household goods, and beverages. Currently, LG Household & Health Care is an exclusive manufacturer and distributor of Coca-Cola brand products in South Korea. In 2009, the company acquired Diamond Water Co., Ltd to strengthen its drinking water business, and in 2011, the company acquired Haitai Beverage Co., Ltd, the third largest beverages company in Korea at the time.

Since 2005, cosmetics business made a successful turnaround through new high-end brand launches including 'The History of Whoo', 'SU:M37', and 'belif'. In 2010, the company acquired low-end cosmetics brandshop, 'The Face Shop', and a complete cosmetics product portfolio consisting of high-end, mid-end, to low-end was achieved. In 2012, LG Household & Health Care acquired cosmetics brand, 'Violet Dream' (former VOV) to strengthen its color cosmetics business. In 2014, the company acquired local cosmeceutical firm, CNP Cosmetics Co., Ltd, in order to expand into newly growing cosmeceutical category.

== Business Division ==
=== Cosmetics ===
LG Household & Health Care is the second largest cosmetics company in South Korea, and it has continued to narrow the gap with its competitor. Its major high-end cosmetics brands include 'The History of Whoo', 'O Hui', 'SU:M37', and 'belif'. The high-end cosmetics business is growing fast with 'The History of Whoo' recording the highest sales among all other brands in major duty-free stores in Korea. The major brands in mid-to-low end cosmetics include 'ISA KNOX', 'Sooryehan', 'BEYOND', and 'THEFACESHOP', the number one brandshop in Korea.

=== Household Goods ===
LG Household & Health Care has maintained a dominant number one position in Korean household goods industry, and still continues to increase its market share through product differentiation, and category expansion. The major business units are personal care and home care. Personal care includes oral care, hair care, and body care, while home care includes dishwashing detergent, laundry detergent, and fabric softener. The major brands are 'Perioe'·'Bamboo Salt'(oral care), 'Elastine'·'Reen'(hair care), 'ON: THE BODY'(body care), 'TECH'(laundry detergent), 'Jayeonpong'(dishwashing detergent), and 'Saffron'(fabric softner).

=== Beverages ===
Beverages business division was established through the M&A of Coca-Cola Beverage (former Coca-Cola Korea Bottling Co., Ltd) in 2007, and is currently the second largest beverage company in South Korea. The major brands are Coca-Cola, Fanta, Sprite, Minute Maid, Sunkist, Georgia, and Powerade.
