= Solax =

Solax or SolaX may refer to:

- SolaX Power
- Solax Studios
