= HS Ad =

HSAd HS애드
- Founded: 2004 in South Korea
- Headquarters: Seoul, South Korea
- Key people: Jong-Ripp Kim, CEO
- Owner: LG Corporation
- Parent: G2R
- Website: HSAd

HS Ad is an advertising agency. It was established in 1984 as an affiliate of LG Group. HS Ad is engaged in all advertising communications, including creative concept development, creation of advertisements for four major media, brand marketing, media planning/buying, mobile and wireless advertising, and event and space design. In 2009, the company reorganized to newly create IMC Strategy Group, an organization for BP (BTL Planner), MP (Media Planner), and AP (Account Planner) to share and jointly address concepts and strategies for brands.

HS Ad has been publishing company newsletters since 1985 and holding the University Advertising Awards since 1988 to define advertising theories systematically, deliver information on advertising, and promote industry-academic collaboration. Its headquarters are located in Gongdeok-dong, Mapo-gu, Seoul, Korea.

== History ==
In 2004, the company was divided into GIIR, which engages in investment and management consulting for its subsidiaries, and LG Ad, which engages in advertising. In April 2008, LG Ad was renamed HS Ad. To provide global services, HS Ad operates offices in New York, Los Angeles, Atlanta, Toronto, Kyiv, Sao Paulo, Beijing, Moscow, Bangkok, Tokyo, Istanbul, Frankfurt, Stockholm, Paris, Milan, Amsterdam, London, Dubai and New Delhi and has a creative boutique, Wisebell, as a subsidiary.
