= SolaX Power =

Chinese solar inverter manufacturer

SolaX Power Network Technology (Zhejiang) Co., Ltd.
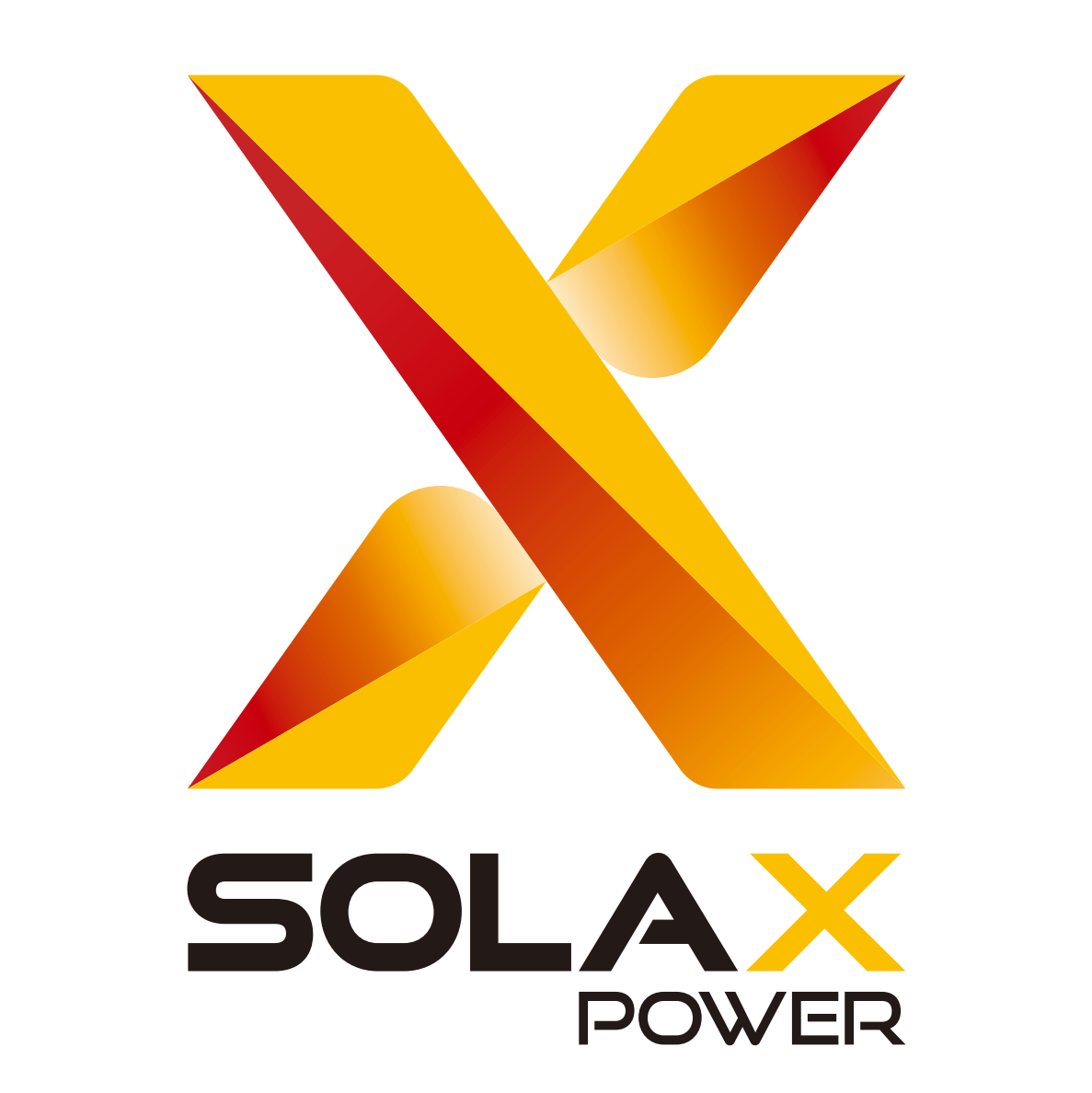
- Type: Public
- Traded as: SSE: 688717
- Industry: Renewable energy
- Founded: 2012; 14 years ago
- Founder: Li Xinfu (chairman)
- Headquarters: Hangzhou
- Area served: Worldwide
- Website: www.solaxpower.com

SolaX Power Network Technology (Zhejiang) Co., Ltd. (Chinese: 艾罗能源), commonly known as SolaX Power or SolaX, is a Chinese manufacturer of solar inverters and energy-storage products headquartered in Hangzhou, Zhejiang. The company is listed on the Shanghai Stock Exchange STAR Market under stock code 688717.

SolaX develops and sells photovoltaic energy storage systems and related products, including energy storage inverters, storage batteries, grid-connected inverters, accessories and monitoring devices. It has been described by media outlets as a solar inverter maker and residential battery manufacturer.

== Products and operations ==
SolaX's product range includes photovoltaic energy-storage inverters, grid-connected inverters, batteries, all-in-one storage systems, EV chargers, microinverters and heat pumps. The company also sells monitoring devices and operates the SolaX Cloud monitoring platform. It supplies solar storage batteries to Project Solar.

SolaX has used battery cells or battery products from external suppliers, including LG Chem and Rept Battero. It also markets its own Triple Power battery range.

The company's products are used in residential, commercial and industrial, and utility-scale photovoltaic and energy-storage applications. At the time of its listing, SolaX reported overseas operations in markets including Australia and the United States. Other reported overseas activity includes Australia, Brazil, and the United Kingdom. SolaX was also named in a World Economic Forum report in connection with Australian virtual power plant development.

== History ==
SolaX was established in 2012. In 2013, the company introduced the SK series of energy storage inverters.

In 2014, SolaX entered the UK market through a partnership with Navitron. In 2015, it formed a partnership with LG Chem to offer a residential combined battery and inverter system using SolaX's Hybrid X grid-tied inverter and LG Chem's RESU6.4EX energy storage system. In 2017, SolaX announced a dual-branded battery product manufactured in partnership with LG Chem and compatible with its X-Hybrid inverter range.

In 2021, SolaX launched its first commercial string inverter series. In 2023, the company introduced the X3-Ultra three-phase hybrid inverter range for commercial rooftop installations.

On 3 January 2024, the company completed an initial public offering and began trading on the STAR Market. The listing was also reported by International Financing Review, which said SolaX rose in its Shanghai debut. KPMG listed SolaX among the ten largest A-share IPOs in the first half of 2024, with proceeds of about CNY 2.2 billion. International Financing Review separately reported that the IPO raised more than CNY 2.2 billion.

In January 2024, SolaX released the X1-IES and X3-IES integrated energy storage systems.

== Financials ==
According to Forbes China, SolaX's revenue in Europe was more than CNY 4.3 billion in 2022. For the year ended 31 December 2025, SolaX reported revenue of CNY 4.08 billion, up 32.84 percent from 2024, and net income of CNY 120.9 million, down 40.61 percent from 2024. In the quarter ended 31 March 2026, the company reported operating revenue of CNY 1.45 billion.

== Product recalls ==
In March 2022, the Australian Competition and Consumer Commission published a recall notice for LG S/A Gen2 home energy storage system batteries supplied by SolaX Power Aus Pty Ltd. The notice was later updated with additional instructions and remedies, and in 2024 the ACCC advised affected consumers to shut down the recalled LG batteries until remedied. The recall was also covered in Australian technology and business media.

== Awards ==
SolaX was awarded in the 20th SunWiz Awards, which use independently verified industry data rather than marketing nominations.
