= Chongyi Church =

Church in Hangzhou, China

Coordinates: 30.259506°N 120.208786°E

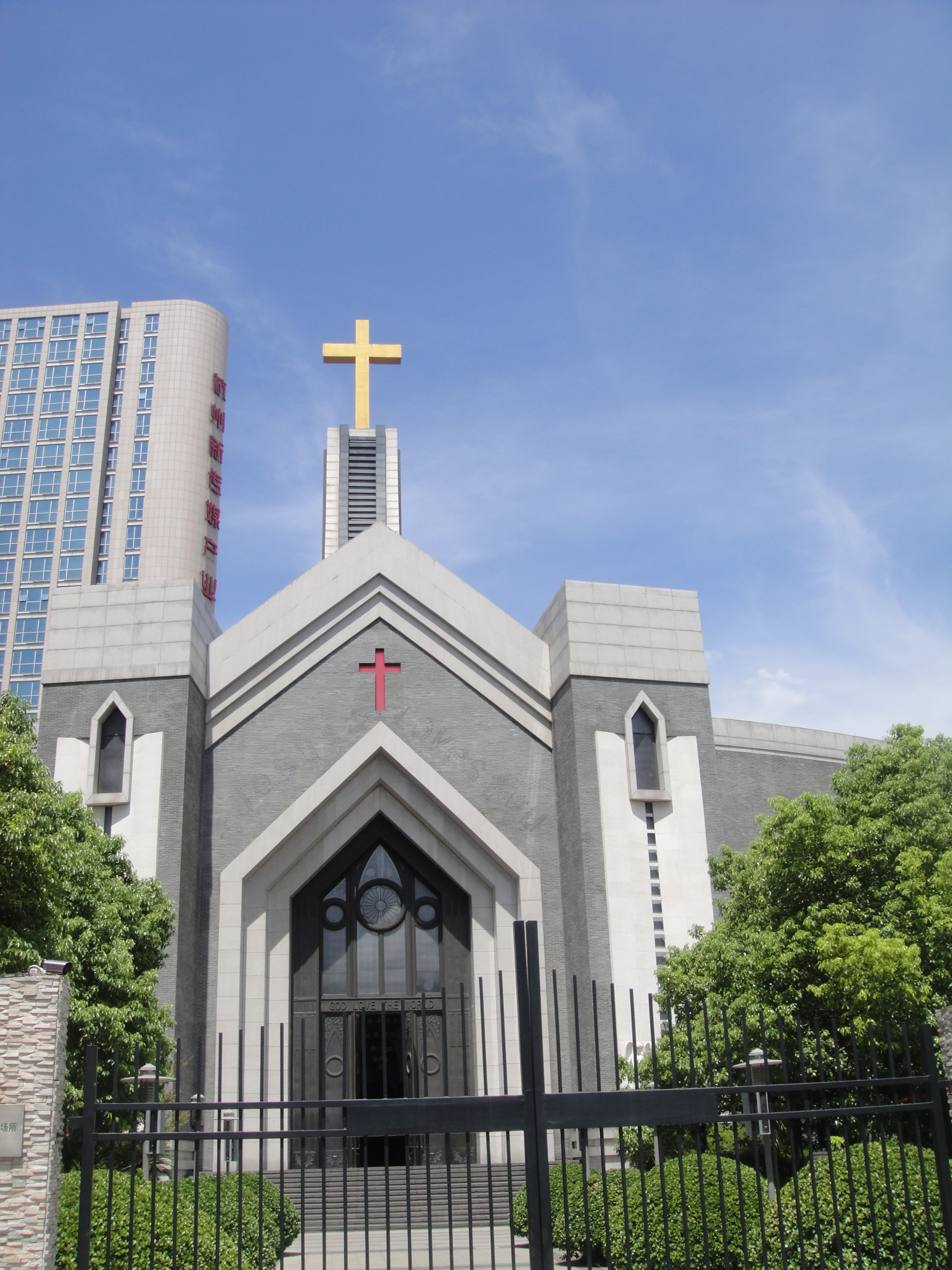
Hangzhou Chongyi Church

Hangzhou Chongyi Church (Chinese: 杭州崇一堂; pinyin: Hángzhōu chóng yī táng) is one of the largest Protestant churches in mainland China, registered under the state-sanctioned Three-Self Patriotic Movement (TSPM).

== History ==
The church traces its history back to November 1866, when the China Inland Mission founder Hudson Taylor established the first settlement for the mission in Hangzhou, renting an old haunted mansion and converting it as a home for living. The mission would buy land on 77 Qintai Street (Chinese: 清泰街77号; pinyin: Qīngtài Jiē 77 Hào) in 1901 and build the original Chongyi Church in 1902.

Chongyi Church would participate in the newly formed TSPM in 1951. However, by October 1958, when unified worship services were mandated across China, consolidating churches in a given region, the land owned by Chongyi Church was converted into warehouses for railway materials. Chongyi Church would only be reopened in the 1980s after religious policies changed.

As Christianity was rapidly growing in Hangzhou, plans were made to build a larger property. After collecting CN¥ 40,000,000 (US$6,700,000), ground was broken on December 30, 2003, and the building was completed on May 5, 2005.

== Megachurch ==
Chongyi Church is one of the largest churches in mainland China. The building covers an area of 12,480 square meters and its main sanctuary can accommodate 5,500 parishioners.

A number of well-known evangelists have preached from its pulpit, including Franklin Graham, before 12,000 attendees in May 2008, and Luis Palau, to an estimated 14,000 in March 2010.

Until January 2016, the senior pastor of the church was Reverend Joseph Gu, who was removed from his post in a probe into the embezzlement of funds.

== Services ==
Sunday at 7:30am to 9:30am and then 10:00am to 11:45am. 5,000 people can be in attendance for each service. Translation into English is available by remote headsets. A small English Prayer service is held at 3:30pm on Sunday
