= Koo Bon-sik =

South Korean executive (born 1958)

- 구본식
- Born: June 28, 1958 (age 67)
- Education: Korea University (1980); University of Michigan (M.S. 1985)
- Occupation: Businessman
- Employer: LT Group
- Father: Koo Cha-kyung

Korean name
- Hangul: 구본식
- RR: Gu Bonsik
- MR: Ku Ponsik

Koo Bon-sik (Korean: 구본식; born June 28, 1958) is a South Korean businessman and chairman of the conglomerate LT Group. Part of the Koo family that also controls LG and Heesung Group, he is among the richest people in South Korea. In April 2024, Forbes estimated his net worth at US$1.06 billion and ranked him 37th richest in the country.

== Biography ==
He was born on June 28, 1958. He is the youngest of four sons and two daughters of former LG chairman Koo Cha-kyung; his male siblings all served or are serving prominent roles in the Koo family's various businesses. He graduated from Shinil High School in 1976. In 1980 he graduated from Korea University with a degree in metallurgical engineering. He graduated from University of Michigan in 1985 with a master's degree in materials engineering.

In 2017, it was reported that his three children sold all their stocks in LG. This was reportedly seen as an attempt to use these funds to expand their influence in Heesung Group.
