= Koo Kwang-mo =

South Korean billionaire (born 1978)

- 구광모
- Born: January 2, 1978 (age 48); Seoul, South Korea
- Education: Rochester Institute of Technology
- Occupation: Businessman
- Employer: LG Corporation

Korean name
- Hangul: 구광모
- Hanja: 具光謨
- RR: Gu Gwangmo
- MR: Ku Kwangmo

Koo Kwang-mo (Korean: 구광모; born January 23, 1978) is a South Korean businessman. As the chairman of LG, he is among the richest people in South Korea. As of April 2026, Forbes estimated his net worth to be US$1.9 billion and ranked him the 30th richest person in South Korea.

== Biography ==
He was born on January 23, 1978 in Seoul, South Korea. He is the eldest son of Koo Bon-neung, the former chairman of Heesung Group. His father is a brother of former LG Group chairman Koo Bon-moo; his great-grandfather is Koo In-hwoi, the founder of LG Group. He graduated from Youngdong High School in 1995 and from Rochester Institute of Technology in New York, United States with a bachelor's in computer science. He joined LG Electronics as a deputy manager of the finance team. In 2004, he was adopted by Koo Bon-moo. Koo Bon-moo had lost his own eldest son to an accident in 1994. Koo Kwang-mo pursued an MBA at Stanford University beginning in 2007, but dropped out before graduating. He worked various management roles in LG thereafter.

On June 29, 2018, he became chairman of LG Group after the death of his adopted father. He reportedly inherited 8.8% of LG stock, which increased his overall stake in the company to 15% and making him the largest shareholder. In 2019, he became owner of the baseball team LG Twins.

Under Koo's leadership, LG exited various businesses such as smartphones, fuel cells, water treatment, electronic payment, and solar panels. His willingness to exit established operations has been described as unusual.

== Personal life ==
He married Jeong Hyo-jeong (정효정), whom he met whilst studying in the United States, in the mid-2000s. She is the eldest daughter of the CEO of the company Bolak. The couple have one son and one daughter.
