= G2R =

GIIR 지투알
- Founded: 2004 in South Korea
- Headquarters: Seoul, South Korea
- Key people: Chong S. Lee, CEO
- Owner: LG Corp 35% Cavendish Square Holdings 28.8% Hwang Soon-tae 5.2% National Pension Service 5.1%
- Parent: LG Corporation
- Website: www.g2rgroup.com

GIIR was established in 2004 and is Korea’s first advertising group holding company engaged in investment and management consulting for its subsidiaries, which specialize in advertising and media communications, including advertising, media, and out-of-home advertising (OOH). GIIR has established a marketing communications group that consists of a number of advertising and media agencies. It is a subsidiary of LG Corporation.

== Subsidiaries ==
- HS Ad, ad creation and advertising agency
- LBEST, advertising agency
- W Brandconnection Co, advertising agency
- Bugs Com Ad, OOH media such as bus advertising
- Alchemedia, mMedia agency
- G Outdoor, OOH media agency
- TAMS Media, OOH advertising such as subway lighting ads
- Beijing Yuanzhimeng Advertising Co., Ltd, advertising agency
- GIIR America, Inc, advertising agency
