= Joseph Gu =

Joseph Gu (simplified Chinese: 顾约瑟; traditional Chinese: 顧約瑟; pinyin: Gù Yuēsè) was former senior pastor of the Chongyi Church in Hangzhou, one of the largest churches in China today, and former head of the Zhejiang Christian Council.

== Biography ==
Gu, originally from Shangyu City, Zhejiang, was born and raised in a Christian home. In the late-1980s and early-1990s, he received his theological training in Zhejiang Theological Seminary and Nanjing Union Theological Seminary, and was a former student of Wang Weifan.

From the 1990s until January 2016, Gu was the senior pastor of the Chongyi Church in Hangzhou, one of the largest churches in China today. He was also formerly head of the Zhejiang Christian Council.

== Protest and arrest ==
As head of the Zhejiang Christian Council, Gu in July 2015 published an open letter denouncing the government-supported "Three Rectifications and One Demolition" campaign to remove crosses from churches and destroy church buildings throughout Zhejiang province.

In January 2016, Gu was removed from his posts as part of a probe into the embezzlement of funds. Although he was released in March 2016, he was placed under house arrest after then, and re-arrested in January 2017.

According to the Three-Self Patriotic Movement (TSPM) and the China Christian Council (CCC), removing Gu was necessary to "move one step closer towards the proper self-construction and management of church locations... and sort out the interpersonal relationship between the province and the two municipal [Christian] organizations."

Gu was reportedly released from arrest on Christmas Eve 2017.
