= Kim Seong-hyun =

South Korean baseball player

- Pitcher
- Born: January 3, 1989 (age 36)
- Batted: Right Threw: Right

KBO League debut
- March 30, 2008, for the Woori Heroes

Last appearance
- October 5, 2011, for the LG Twins

KBO statistics
- Win–loss record: 9–16
- Earned run average: 5.44
- Strikeouts: 138

Teams
- Woori / Nexen Heroes (2008–2011); LG Twins (2011)

- Kim Seong-hyun
- Hangul: 김성현
- Hanja: 金聖賢
- RR: Gim Seonghyeon
- MR: Kim Sŏnghyŏn

Kim Seong-hyun (Korean: 김성현; Hanja: 金成鉉; born January 3, 1989, in Daegu) is a former South Korean pitcher who formerly played for the Nexen Heroes and the LG Twins in the KBO League. He batted and threw right-handed.

== Amateur career ==
Kim enrolled at Daegu High School in 2005, but he transferred to Jeju Tourism High School (the only high school in Jeju Province to have a baseball team) after the 2005 season.

After sitting out the first half of the 2006 season as required under the Korea Baseball Association rules for transfer students, Kim subsequently became the top right-handed starting pitcher at the high school level, hurling a four-hit complete game shutout with 13 strikeouts on June 30, 2006, in the first round of the Golden Lion Flag National Championship.

Kim became the first Korean high school pitcher ever to pitch a 10-inning no-hitter on July 14, 2007, in the second round of the Daebung Flag National Championship. In that game, he tossed 11.2 scoreless innings but gave up a hit in the eleventh inning and the game was not considered an official no-hitter.

== Professional career ==
Kim was drafted 13th overall (6th pick of the second round) in the 2008 KBO First-Year Player Draft by the Woori Heroes. He collected his first pro league save on April 3, 2008, against the Hanwha Eagles, throwing one shutout inning. However, Kim was demoted from closer to setup man in a week. Kim finished the season with a 4.03 ERA and a 0–4 record with one save in 38.0 innings pitched, spending the majority of his rookie season in the Heroes' second team.

In 2009, Kim recorded two wins, earning his first win as a starter on May 31 against the Lotte Giants, but finished the season with a disappointing 6.99 ERA in 65.2 innings pitched.

In 2010, Kim's first full season with the Heroes, he moved into the starting rotation and finished with a 7–8 record and a 4.90 ERA in 90 innings, earning the second most wins among the Heroes' pitchers behind Adrian Burnside. After the 2010 season, Kim was selected for the South Korea national baseball team to compete in the Intercontinental Cup held in Taichung.

On Feb 28, 2012, he arrested by a court of Daegu as intentionally losing games. On March 6, 2012, he was banned from any professional baseball activities and was released by LG with former pitcher Park Hyun-june.

=== Notable international careers ===
Year	Venue	Competition	Team	Individual Note
2010	Chinese Taipei	Intercontinental Cup	6th	0-1; 0.00 ERA (3 G, 7.2 IP, 0 ER, 4 K)
