= Gu Yudong =

Chinese surgeon and politician (1937–2025)

- 顾玉东
- Born: 19 October 1937; Zhangqiu County, Shandong, China
- Died: 24 May 2025 (aged 87); Shanghai, China
- Education: Shanghai Medical University
- Scientific career
- Fields: Microsurgery
- Workplaces: Huashan Hospital Affiliated to Fudan University

Chinese name
- Simplified Chinese: 顾玉东
- Traditional Chinese: 顧玉東
Transcriptions
Standard Mandarin
- Hanyu Pinyin: Gù Yùdōng

Gu Yudong (Chinese: 顾玉东; 19 October 1937 – 24 May 2025) was a Chinese microsurgery specialist, and an academician of the Chinese Academy of Engineering. He was a representative of the 15th National Congress of the Chinese Communist Party.

== Life and career ==
Gu was born in Zhangqiu County (now Zhangqiu District, Jinan), Shandong, on 19 October 1937. He graduated from Shanghai Medical University in 1961. He worked at Huashan Hospital Affiliated to Fudan University since 1978. He became director of Shanghai Institute of Hand Surgery in January 1995.

On 24 May 2025, Gu died from a heart attack in Shanghai, at the age of 87.

== Honours and awards ==
- 1994 Member of the Chinese Academy of Engineering (CAE)
