= Park Hyun-june =

South Korean baseball player

- Pitcher
- Born: September 22, 1986 (age 40); Jeonju, North Jeolla Province, South Korea
- Batted: Right Threw: Right

KBO debut
- April 4, 2009, for the SK Wyverns

Last appearance
- October 2, 2011, for the LG Twins

KBO statistics
- Win–loss: 15–14
- Earned run average: 4.87
- Strikeouts: 190
- Stats at Baseball Reference

Teams
- SK Wyverns (2009–2010); LG Twins (2010–2011)

Park Hyun-june (Korean: 박현준; Hanja: 朴顯俊; born September 22, 1986, in Jeonju, North Jeolla Province) is a South Korean pitcher. He previously played for the SK Wyverns and the LG Twins in the Korea Baseball Organization. He bats and throws right-handed.

== Amateur career ==
In 2005, Park enrolled in Kyung Hee University after graduation from Jeonju High School. Park started to garner attention in 2007 when he pitched a no-hitter against Wonkwang University in the group round of the college national championship (fall league) on September 12.

In 2008, as a senior at Kyung Hee University, Park led his team to win the college national championship (spring league) and earned MVP honors, tossing a two-run complete game victory in the final and posting a 3–0 record and a 0.87 ERA through the tournament. In July 2008, Park was selected for the South Korean collegiate national baseball team to complete in the World University Baseball Championship as a starter in the Czech Republic, when he was one of the most disappointing pitchers on the team. He racked up a win against Chinese Taipei in the round-robin phase, which assured South Korea a spot in the semifinals. However, he finished the tournament with a 6.61 ERA and 15 runs allowed in 16.1 innings.

=== Notable international careers ===
Year	Venue	Competition	Team	Individual note
2008	Czech Republic	World University Baseball Championship	4th	1-1, 6.61 ERA (4 G, 16.1 IP, 12 ER, 16 K)

== Professional career ==
=== SK Wyverns ===
Park was drafted by the SK Wyverns in the second round (8th pick, 16th overall) of the 2009 amateur draft. In the 2009 season, Park appeared in just 14 games as a setup man and posted a 5.82 ERA in 17 innings. After the season, Park was called up to the South Korean national baseball team and competed in the Baseball World Cup, where he was 1–0 with a 1.80 ERA appearing in 4 games as a relief pitcher.

Park was selected for the 26-man roster of the Wyverns' first team at the start of the 2010 season. However, he was relegated to the minor league after posting an ERA of 12.50 as a relief pitcher.

=== LG Twins ===
On July 28, 2010, Park was traded to the LG Twins. The Twins immediately moved Park from bullpen to the starting rotation of the Twins' first team, where he emerged as one of the Twins' reliable starters for the next season racking up 2 wins with a 5.76 ERA in 9 games as a starter. After the 2010 season, Park was selected for the South Korean national baseball team to compete in the Intercontinental Cup held in Taichung. He hurled a complete game to lead South Korea to an 8-1 win over Japan in Round 2 of the competition.

2011 is largely considered to be Park's breakout season, in which he pitched to a 13–10 record and a 4.18 ERA.

==== Game-fixing scandal ====
Prior to the 2012 season, Park was suspended by the KBO League due to his involvement in a match fixing scandal during the 2011 season. He was accused of accepting bribes in return for trying to fix baseball games. He was later banned permanently from playing in the KBO League.

=== Notable international careers ===
Year	Venue	Competition	Team	Individual Note
2009	Europe	Baseball World Cup	9th	1-0, 1.80 ERA (4 G, 5.0 IP, 1 ER, 8 K)
2010	Chinese Taipei	Intercontinental Cup	6th	1-0, 2.89 ERA (2 G, 9.1 IP, 3 ER, 6 K)

== Pitching style ==
Park is a sidearm pitcher with an 87-91 mph sinker (tops out at 94 mph), a slider, and a forkball.
