= Ku Jung-seo =

South Korean literary critic

Ku Jung-seo (Korean: 구중서; born 1936) is a South Korean literary critic. Regarding literature as an art form reflective of reality, he has maintained his position on the historical responsibility of literature and social participation of people in literature. His critical work began in 1963 with a focus on the theories of realism, continuance of literary history, and Third World literature.

== Life ==
=== Early life and literary debut ===
Ku was born in Gwangju, Gyeonggi Province, in 1936. In elementary school, he enjoyed reading children's literary magazines Eorini (어린이) and Sohaksaeng (소학생) and grew up into a boy who loved literature. As an adult, he gained interest in history as well and devoured books on Korean literature and history. He was also interested in the ideas of silhak scholars Hong Dae-yong and Pak Chiwŏn from the Joseon dynasty, and modern philosophers Kim Jun-seop and Ham Seok-heon. During the April 19 Revolution and the May 16 military coup, he began to share his resistance against social injustice through his work and contemplated the social responsibility of writers. In 1962, he began to work in the editing department of a publisher and actively interacted with contemporary writers. In 1963, he made his literary debut as a critic when his literary criticism titled "Yeoksareul saneun jakgaeui chaegim (역사를 사는 작가의 책임 The Responsibility of Writers Living in History)" was published in Sinsajo (신사조).

=== Writing career ===
In 1969, Ku founded the magazine Sanghwang (상황) with other writers, such as Lim Heon-yong, Shin Sang-woong, and Kim Pyong-gol. A magazine that aimed to promote realistically participatory literary realism pieces with an active interest in the issue of minjok, or the Korean race, Sanghwang was one of the major literary magazines that showed the direction of Korean literature in the 1970s, alongside The Quarterly Changbi and Literature and Intelligence.

In 1980, he led the "declaration of intellectuals" along with Shin Kyeong-nim, Yun Heunggil, Park Taesun, and Cho T'ae-il, and suffered hardships for violating martial law. Ku also played an influential role in progressive culture and arts organizations, such as the Korean People's Artists Federation and the Writers Association of Korea. In 1996, he served as a board member of the Korea People's Artists Federation, and he has been serving as a board member for the Writers Association of Korea since 2010. He is a recipient of the Yosan Literary Award (1988) and the Palbong Award for Literary Criticism (1997).

==== Sijo composition ====
Ku has been active not only as a literary critic but as a sijo poet, calligrapher, and painter. He has published three sijo anthologies and even created a painting with his poem. In 2015, he held an exhibition of his poems, calligraphy, and paintings.

== Writing ==
=== Literary realism ===
The issue of methodologies of looking at the reality and literature of South Korea began to be boiled down to the theme of "realism" in 1970, starting with a discussion titled "April 19 Revolution and Korean Literature," hosted by Sasanggye (사상계 World of Thought). Ku Jung-seo and Kim Hyeon had an intense discussion on realism, joined by Yeom Mu-woong, Kim Ch'i-su, and Kim Byeong-ik. According to Ku, the role of a writer begins from a meticulous observation of reality. However, if a work of literature simply stops at objectively describing the reality, it is nothing more than naturalist literature that lacks historical awareness. A writer must capture the social contradictions that create problems and find an opportunity to overcome the contradictions. Only then can his writing be realist literature. Ku systematically organized his arguments from the discussion and published the "Hanguk rieoliseum munhagui hyeongseong (한국 리얼리즘 문학의 형성 The Formation of Korean Realist Literature) in 1970. In it, he explained realism as a literary method and defined the significance of Korean literature as an agent of realism. This was the first piece of writing on realism that began after Korea's liberation from the Japanese rule.

=== Continuity of literary history ===
Intense discussions on the starting point of modern Korean literature and methodologies on writing literary history began in the 1970s. Hanguk munhaksa (한국문학사 History of Korean Literature), written by Kim Yun-sik and Kim Hyeon in 1973 explained that the modern era began in the late eighteenth century, during the reigns of Yeongjo and Jeongjo, and emphasized the history of Korean literature that came afterward. On the other hand, Ku emphasized the continuity between classical literature and modern literature and formed his thoughts on literary history based on the question: "How does the culture of previous era continue into the next?" He also argued that writing about literary history should not be limited to the intellectuals' ideological flow and that it should pay more attention to the basic culture of the people. Specifically, he wished to capture the ways in which literary forms that have developed spontaneously based on the lives of ordinary people, including hyangga, Koryosogyo, and pansori soseol were rediscovered by Yi Hae-jo, Chae Man-sik, and other early modern Korean writers. In 1978, Ku organized his position on Korea's literary history and published Hanguk munhaksaron (한국문학사론 The Theory on the History of Korean Literature).

=== Third World literature ===
Ku Jung-seo was also a leading scholar of the Third World Literature theory that began to be discussed in the 1980s. According to him, the West achieved an economic boom through industrialization based on colonization, but as a result human and spiritual values were seriously undermined. On the other hand, the Third World, consisting of Asia, Africa, and Latin America, has become colonies to the powerful countries in the West and underdeveloped in terms of politics and economy, but the damage to human values resulting from materialism is relatively less. Ku believed that, in the future, Third World literature can expand human values in the cultural tradition of each nation and restore the health of world literature in place of Western literature. He developed this thesis through writings, such as "Je-3 segye munhangron" (제3세계 문학론 Theory on Third World Literature) (1979) and "Je-3 segye munhagui jeonmang" (Prospects for Third World Literature) (1980).

== Works ==
=== Books on literary criticism ===
- 《구도의 언어》, 가톨릭출판사, 1975 / Kudoui eoneo (Language of Composition), Catholic Books, 1975.
- 《한국문학사론》, 대학도서, 1978 / Hanguk munhaksaron (The Theory on the History of Korean Literature), Daehadoseo, 1978.
- 《문학을 위하여》, 평민사, 1978 / Munhageul wihayeo (For Literature), Pyeongminsa, 1978.
- 《민족문학의 길》, 새밭, 1979 / Minjok munhagui gil (The Path of Korean Literature), Saebat, 1979.
- 《의로운 사마리아 사람》, 성바오로출판사, 1980 / Uiroun samaria saram (The Righteous Samaritan), Seongbaoro Chulpansa, 1980.
- 《분단시대의 문학》, 전예원, 1981 / Bundansidaeui munhak (Literature in the Era of Division), Jeonyewon, 1981.
- 《한국문학과 역사의식》, 창비, 1985 / Hanguk munhakgwa yeoksauisik (Korean Literature and Historical Awareness), Changbi, 1985.
- 《자연과 리얼리즘》, 태학사, 1993 / Jayeongwa rieoliseum (Nature and Realism), Taehaksa, 1993.
- 《문학과 현대사상》, 문학동네, 1996 / Munhakgwa hyeondaesasang (Literature and Modern Thought), Munhakdongne, 1996.
- 《역사와 인간》, 작가, 2001 / Yeoksawa ingan (History and Humans), Jakga, 2001.
- 《면앙정에 올라서서》, 책만드는집, 2006 / Myeonangjeonge olaseoseo (On Top of the Myeonang Pavilion), Chaekmandeuneunjip, 2006.
- 《문학적 현실의 전개》, 창비, 2006 / Munhakjeok hyeonsilui jeongae (The Progress of Literary Reality), Changbi, 2006.
- 《문학의 분출》, 케포이북스, 2008 / Munhakui bunchul (Eruption of Literature), Kephoi Books, 2008.
- 《사랑하고 또 사랑하고 용서하세요》, 책만드는집, 2009 / Saranghago tto saranghago yongseohaseyo (Love, Love Again, and Forgive), Chaekmandeuneunjip, 2009.
- 《좋은 언어로 세상을 채워야》, 꼬무니오, 2014 / Joeun eoneoro sesangeul chaewoya (Fill the World with Good Language), Comunio, 2014.
- 《한국 천주교문학사》, 소명출판, 2014 / Hanguk cheonjugyo munhaksa (History of Catholicism in Korea), Somyung Books
- 《김수환 추기경 행복한 고난》, 사람이야기, 2019 / Kim Sou-hwan chugigyeong haengbokhan gonan (Cardinal Kim Sou-hwan's Joyful Suffering), Saramiyagi, 2019.

=== Co-authorships and compilations ===
- 《대화집 김수환 추기경》(편저), 지식산업사, 1981 / Daehwajip Kim Sou-hwan chugigyeong (Conversations with Cardinal Kim Sou-hwan) (compilation), Jisik Sanup, 1981.
- 《제3세계 문학론》(공저), 한벗, 1982 / Je-3 segye munhangron (The Theory on Third World Literature) (co-authorship), Hanbeot, 1982.
- 《신동엽 그의 삶과 문학》(편저), 온누리, 1983 / Shin Dong-yup geuui samgwa munhak (Shin Dong-yup, His Life and Literature) (compilation), Onnuri, 1983.
- 《신경림 문학의 세계》(공저), 창비, 1995 / Shin Keyong-nim munhakui segye (The World of Shin Kyeong-min’s Literature) (co-authorship), Changbi, 1995.
- 《한국 근대문학 연구》(공저), 태학사, 1997 / Hanguk geundaemunhak yeongu (A Study on Modern Korean Literature) (co-authorship), Taehaksa, 1997.
- 《민족시인 신동엽》(공저), 소명출판, 1999 / Minjoksiin Shin Dong-yup (Shin Dong-yup, People’s Poet) (co-authorship), Somyung Books, 1999.
- 《안재홍 고원의 밤》(편저), 범우사, 2007 / Ahn Jae-hong kowonui bam (Ahn Jae-hong, Night on the Highlands) (compilation), Bumwoosa, 2007.

=== Sijo collections ===
- 《불면의 좋은 시간》, 책만드는집, 2009 / Bulmyeonui joeun sigan (Good Time of Insomnia), Chaekmandeuneunjip, 2009.
- 《세족례》, 고요아침, 2012 / Sejongnye (Washing of the Feet), Goyoachim, 2012.
- 《새로운 천지》, 시인, 2012 / Saeroun cheonji (New Heaven and Earth), Siin, 2012.
- 《인사동 게바라》, 천년의 시작 2019 / Insadong gebara (Guevara in Insadong), Cheonnyeonui Sijak, 2019.

== Awards ==
- Yosan Literary Award
- Hankook Ilbo Palbong Award for Literary Criticism (for Munhakgwa hyeondaesasang)
