= Ku Kyung-mi =

South Korean novelist

Ku Kyung-mi (born 1972) is a South Korean novelist. A member of literary coterie Work (작업), she began to write fiction in 1996. Her fiction deals mainly with the out-of-work, who are labeled as failures in a capitalist economy. She has published novels targeted at young adult readers since 2012. She has won two writing awards: Kyungnam Newspaper Annual Spring Writing Contest (1996) (Faded Memories) and Kyunghyang Shinmun New Writer's Award (Walking into Camellia Inn).

== Early life ==
Ku was born in Uiryeong-gun, Gyeongsangnam-do, Korea in 1972. She received her bachelor's degree in Korean language and literature from Kyungnam University in 1995. Dreaming of becoming a novelist from childhood, she wrote studies throughout her undergraduate years. She had, however, neither faculty member writing novels at the university nor like-minded person aspiring to be a novelist around her. Her short story Jeomun gieok (저문 기억 Faded Memories) won a prize at the 1996 Kyungnam Newspaper Annual Spring Writing Contest. Then she became a published author after her second short story Dongbaekyeogwane deulda (동백여관에 들다 Walking into Camellia Inn) was selected in the short story category of the 1999 Kyunghyang Shinmun New Writer's Award.

In 2000, she formed Work (작업) with her colleagues who made their debut as a writer around the same time, which published three issues of the coterie magazine. She worked at publisher Contemporary Literature from 2003 to 2005. Leaving the company, she became a full-time writer. She served as an editor for literary magazine Novel Literature (소설문학) from 2013 to 2015.

== Career ==
=== The Idle ===
In her fiction, Ku has constantly dealt with those who are negatively perceived in a capitalist society.

In Ku's first collection of short stories Noneun ingan (노는 인간 The Idle; 2005), none of the characters works for wages. The main character of The Idle, the title story in the collection, is a novelist little more than a loafer. He sleeps until the middle of the day and spends much time gaming and little time writing. The characters’ “act of being idle” resembles “inactivity” itself. The seemingly listless lives that the characters are living are a form of resistance to collective norms, ethics, and order, implying their strong desire to reject socially accepted ideas and create their own worlds.

In her novel Mianhae Benjamin (미안해, 벤자민 I am Sorry, Benjamin; 2008), Ku continues to look into the listless, purposeless days of those who are jobless or economically incapable of paying their way. With the subject matter of moneylending business, she profoundly explores a chain of debt and repayment within the capitalist logic of exchange and, at the same time, criticizes the false consciousness of the helpless, idle people who accuse the chain and yet depend on it. Her short stories in Geeureumeul jugyeora (게으름을 죽여라 Break Laziness; 2009) are parallel to I am Sorry, Benjamin (2008) in that they capture the social realities of those involved in the capitalist exchange logic. The characters in the collection are average jobholders of all ages, but they are not so different from idle jobless people as they make a poor living and live on the fringes of society.

Laolaoga joa (라오라오가 좋아 I Love Laolao; 2010) is about Lao woman Amei, who is married to a Korean, and a Korean man in his forties, referred to as He, who is alienated from his own family, eloping together. Amei and He, both maladjusted to reality, decisively attempt to elope, but their runaway lacking motive ends in failure. Through their act of eloping, Ku depicts humans' anxiety, uncertainty in life, and purposelessness. The novel also reveals the characters’ defiance and self-despair as her other works do.

=== Young adult fiction ===
Starting from Urideului jachwi gonghwaguk (우리들의 자취 공화국 Our Kingdom for Living Alone; 2012), Ku's novels have been targeted mainly at young adults, featuring younger characters than in previous works, accordingly. In her young adult fiction, she earnestly explores the challenges facing adolescents from their own viewpoints rather than trying to enlighten them. Our Kingdom for Living Alone (2012) deals with high school girls who live alone, independently and yet together, in a provincial town in 1991. Ibangineul boatta (이방인을 보았다 I Saw a Stranger; 2014) adopts the style of detective fiction, where 17-year-old students, who break into the house of an old man, Mr Jang, for money for construction, try to solve the mystery of Jang's death to clear themselves from a false charge. As the story continues, it reveals the issues surrounding the lonely deaths of the isolated elderly and historical scars from the Vietnam War. In Ku's novel Paranmanjang nae insaeng (파란만장 내 인생 My Life Full of Ups and Downs; 2016), 15-year-old Han-dong and his friends struggle to address their family problems in their own way without seeking adults' help.

== Works ==
=== Short story collections ===
- 《노는 인간》, 열림원, 2005 / Noneun ingan (The Idle), Yolimwon, 2005.
- 《게으름을 죽여라》, 문학동네, 2009 / Geeureumeul jugyeora (Break Laziness), Munhakdongne, 2009.

=== Novels ===
- 《미안해 벤자민》, 문학동네, 2008 / Mianhae benjamin (I Am Sorry, Benjamin), Munhakdongne, 2008.
- 《라오라오가 좋아》, 현대문학, 2010 / Laolaoga joa (I Love Laolao), Contemporary Literature, 2010.
- 《키위새 날다》, 자음과모음, 2011 / Kiwisae nalda (Flies the Kiwi), Jaeum & Moeum, 2011.
- 《우리들의 자취 공화국》, 문학과지성사, 2012 / Urideului jachwi gonghwaguk (Our Kingdom for Living Alone), Moonji, 2012.
- 《이방인을 보았다》, 북멘토, 2014 / Ibangineul boatta (I Saw a Stranger), Book Mentor, 2014.
- 《파란만장 내 인생》, 문학과지성사, 2016 / Paranmanjang nae insaeng (My Life Full of Ups and Downs), Moonji, 2016.

=== Coterie magazine Work ===
- Ku Kyung-mi, Kim Do-eon, Kim Do-yeon et al. 《거짓말》, 문학동네, 2002 / Geojitmal (Lies), Munhakdongne, 2002.
- Ku Kyung-mi, Kwon Jung-hyun, Won Jong-kuk et al. 《어젯밤에 우리 아빠가》, 샘터, 2005 / Eojetbame woori appaga (My Father Last Night), Samtoh, 2005.
- Ku Kyung-mi, Kim Do-yeon et al. 《나를 속이는 내 안의 사랑》, 북인, 2009 / Nareul sogineun nae anui sarang (The Love within that Deceives Me), Book In, 2009.

=== Thematic story collections ===
- Ku Kyung-mi et al. 《사랑해 눈》, 열림원, 2011 / Saranghae nun (I Love You, Snow), Yolimwon, 2011.
- Ku Kyung-mi, Kim Jong-kwang, Lee Sung-ah et al. 《우리 이제 겨우 열여섯》, 우리학교, 2012 / Uri ije gyeou yeolyeosut (We Are Only 16), Woorischool, 2012.
- Ku Kyung-mi, Lee Byung-seung, Kim Do-yeon et al. 《난 아프지 않아》, 북멘토, 2013 / Nan apeuji ana (I Am Not Hurt), Book Mentor, 2013.

== Work in translation ==
- I Love Laolao (我爱劳劳, 人民文学出版社, 2019, 徐丽红)
