= Moon Sung-hyun (politician) =

South Korean Politician

Moon Sung-Hyun (born 1952) is a South Korean politician from South Gyeongsang Province. He was a graduate of Seoul National University with a major in Business Administration.

He started work as a press and lathe operator in 1979 and by 1985 he headed the trade union of Tong-Il Heavy Machinery. He became Secretary General of the Korean Trade Union Congress in 1993, and from 1999 held the position of President of the Korean Metalworkers Federation.

He was a founding member of the Democratic Labor Party, and a member of the central committee. He has been the head of the South Gyeongsang Province office of the DLP since 2004, and became party president in 2006.
