= Andrew Kim =

American intelligence officer

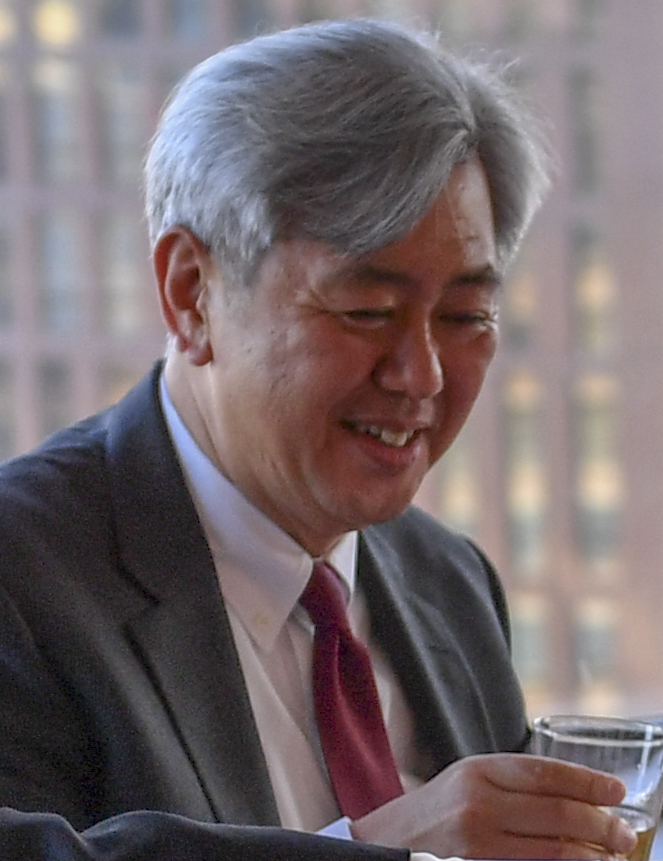
- The cropped picture from the meeting with North Korean representative(s) regarding the 2018 Trump-Kim summit

Korean name
- Hangul: 김성현
- RR: Gim Seonghyeon
- MR: Kim Sŏnghyŏn

Kim Sung-hyun (Korean: 김성현), known as Andrew Kim, was a Korean-American intelligence officer and head of the Central Intelligence Agency's Korea Mission Centre.

== Education ==
Born in South Korea, in the city of Pyeongchang. Kim was educated at Seoul High School alongside Suh Hoon. He is a cousin of Chung Eui-yong, the director of South Korea's National Security Office.

== CIA career ==
He served in Moscow, Beijing and Bangkok and later as station chief in Seoul for the Central Intelligence Agency. He retired but returned to lead the Korea Mission Centre. Kim is viewed as a hawk on North Korea.
