= Kim Sung-hyun (footballer) =

South Korean footballer

Personal information
- Date of birth: 25 June 1993 (age 33)
- Place of birth: South Korea
- Height: 1.83 m (6 ft 0 in)
- Position: Defender

Team information
- Current team: Seoul E-Land FC
- Number: 35

Youth career
- 2009–2011: Jinju High School

Senior career*
Years	Team	Apps	(Gls)
2012–2016	Gyeongnam	16	(0)
2014	→ Chungju Hummel (loan)	3	(0)
2014–2016	→ Ansan Police (army)	11	(0)
2017–2019	Khon Kaen		
2020–	Seoul E-Land	6	(0)
- * Club domestic league appearances and goals as of 16 August 2020

- Kim Sung-hyun
- Hangul: 김성현
- Hanja: 金成炫
- RR: Gim Seonghyeon
- MR: Kim Sŏnghyŏn

Kim Sung-hyun (Korean: 김성현; born 25 June 1993) is a South Korean footballer who plays as defender for Seoul E-Land FC in K-League.

== Career ==
He was selected by Gyeongnam FC in 2012 K-League Draft. He made his K-League debut match against Jeju on 3 November 2012.
