= LG =

South Korean multinational conglomerate

LG Corporation
- Logo used since 30 December 2014 (Note: The logo's symbol has been in use since 4 January 1995.)

- Headquarters at Yeoui-dong, Yeongdeungpo District, Seoul, South Korea, in 2015
- Native name: 주식회사 엘지
- Formerly: Lucky (1947–1983); Lucky-Goldstar (1983–1995)
- Type: Public
- Traded as: KRX: 003550
- Industry: Conglomerate
- Founded: 5 January 1947; 79 years ago (as Lucky); October 1958; 68 years ago (as Goldstar); January 1983; 43 years ago (as Lucky-Goldstar); 4 January 1995; 31 years ago (as LG)
- Founder: Koo In-hwoi
- Headquarters: Seoul, South Korea
- Area served: Worldwide
- Key people: Koo Kwang-mo (chairman and CEO); Kwon Young-soo (vice chairman)
- Products: Electronics; Chemicals; Telecommunications; Engineering; Information technology; Power generation
- Revenue: KRW87.7 trillion (US$65.43 billion) (2024)
- Owners: Koo family (45.9%); NPS (8.03%); Mirae Asset (5.5%)
- Number of employees: 222,000 (2023)
- Subsidiaries: LG Electronics; LG Display; LG Innotek; LG Uplus; LG Chem; LG Energy Solution; LG H&H; Zenith Electronics
- Website: lgcorp.com

LG Corporation (also known as LG Group or simply LG), (Note: Korean: 주식회사 엘지) formerly known as Lucky Goldstar, (Note: Korean: Leokki Geumseong; Korean: 럭키금성; Hanja: 樂喜金星) is a South Korean multinational conglomerate founded by Koo In-hwoi in 1947 and managed by successive generations of his family. Headquartered in the LG Twin Towers building in Yeouido-dong, Yeongdeungpo District, in Seoul, it was the sixth-largest company in South Korea by revenue in 2023. LG develops, manufactures, and markets electronics, chemicals, household appliances, and telecommunications products. It operates subsidiaries in over 80 countries, including LG Electronics, Zenith, LG Display, LG Uplus, LG Innotek, LG Chem, LG Energy Solution, and LG AI Research.

== History ==
LG Corporation was established as Lak Hui Chemical Industrial Corp. in 1947 by Koo In-hwoi. Its first product was "Lucky Cream", the first Korean make-up cream. In 1952, Lak Hui (락희) (pronounced "Lucky"; now LG Chem) became the first South Korean company to enter the plastics industry. As the company expanded its plastics business, it established GoldStar Co. Ltd. (now LG Electronics Inc.) in 1958. Both companies Lucky and GoldStar merged to form Lucky-Goldstar in 1983.

GoldStar produced South Korea's first radio. Many consumer electronics were sold under the brand name GoldStar, while some other household products (not available outside South Korea) were sold under the brand name of Lucky. The Lucky brand was famous for hygiene products such as soaps and HiTi laundry detergents, but the brand was mostly associated with its Lucky and Perioe toothpaste. LG continues to manufacture some of these products for the South Korean market.

Koo In-hwoi led the corporation until his death in 1969, at which time, his son Koo Cha-kyung took over. In 1995, he passed the leadership to his son, Koo Bon-moo. Koo Bon-moo renamed the company to LG in that year. The company then trademarked the letters LG with the company's tagline "Life's Good". LG has owned the domain name LG.com since 2009. It had operated LG.co.kr since 1997.

LG replaced its old logo with a new one on 30 December 2014, changing the wordmark font from Helvetica to LG Smart, the new custom corporate typeface of the company since 2013.

Koo Bon-moo died of a brain tumor on 20 May 2018. In July 2018, it was announced that Koo Kwang-mo, the nephew and adopted son of Koo Bon-moo, will be the new CEO of LG. Koo Bon-moo adopted his nephew in 2004, after losing his only son in 1994, citing "a family tradition of male-only succession".

=== LG jingle ===
LG jingle
- Sample of the jingle [0:03] via

The G-E-F-D-E-C-C' jingle was produced by Musikvergnuegen and written by Walter Werzowa (who had previously composed the Intel bong) in 2008. The jingle has been featured in LG commercials and devices and is recognised worldwide. It is derived from the English traditional tune "The Lincolnshire Poacher".

=== Logo history ===
4 January 1995 – 29 December 2014

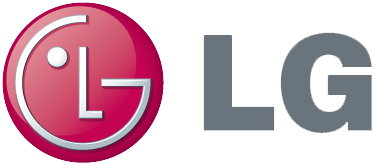
2008 – 29 December 2014

30 December 2014 – present

May 2023 – present (secondary)

== Corporate affairs ==
LG Corporation is a holding company that operates worldwide through more than 30 companies in the electronics, chemical, and telecom fields. It is headquarters in the LG Twin Towers building in Yeouido-dong, Yeongdeungpo District, Seoul. Its electronics subsidiaries manufacture and sell products ranging from electronic and digital home appliances to televisions and mobile telephones, from thin-film-transistor liquid-crystal displays to security devices and semiconductors. In the chemical industry, subsidiaries manufacture and sell products including cosmetics, industrial textiles, rechargeable batteries and toner products, polycarbonates, medicines, and surface decorative materials. Its telecom products include long-distance and international phone services, mobile and broadband telecommunications services, as well as consulting and telemarketing services. LG also operates the Coca-Cola Korea Bottling Company, manages real estate, offers management consulting, and operates professional sports clubs.

LG AI Research was launched in December 2021. In 2021, the company announced its first version of EXAONE. In 2023, the company stated that the language model reduced costs by 78% by making inference faster and using memory more efficiently and multimodal model used more memory to improve content quality while significantly increasing inference speed, leading to a 66% cost reduction.

=== Corporate governance ===
As of September 2023:

Shareholder	Stake (%)	Flag
Koo Kwang-mo	15.95%	South Korea
National Pension Service	6.83%	South Korea
Silchester International Investors	6.03%	United Kingdom
Koo Bon-sik	4.48%	South Korea
Kim Young-sik	4.20%	South Korea
Koo Bon-neung	3.05%	South Korea
Koo Yeon-kyung	2.92%	South Korea
LG Yonam Foundation	2.13%	South Korea
Koo Bon-joon	2.04%	South Korea
LG Yonam Cultural Foundation	1.12%	South Korea
Koo Yeon-soo	0.72%	South Korea
Kim Sun-hye	0.69%	South Korea
Koo Mi-jung	0.69%	South Korea
Lee Uk-jin	0.61%	South Korea
Koo Hyung-mo	0.60%	South Korea
LG Evergreen Foundation	0.48%	South Korea
Koo Ja-young	0.34%	South Korea
LG Welfare Foundation	0.23%	South Korea

=== Subsidiaries ===
- LG Electronics
- LG Display
- LG Innotek
- LG Chem
- LG Energy Solution
- LG Household & Health Care
- LG AI Research
- LG U+
- LG CNS
- G2R
- HS Ad

=== Associated companies ===
- GS Group
- LS Group
- LIG Group
- LX Group

=== Sports sponsorship ===
LG owns the South Korean professional baseball team LG Twins, and is the main sponsor of basketball team Changwon LG Sakers. LG is also a partner of the American professional baseball team Texas Rangers.

LG also sponsored football clubs Girondins de Bordeaux from 1999 to 2000, Leicester City F.C. from 2001 to 2003, Olympique Lyonnais from 2004 to 2006, AEK Athens from 2006 to 2009, Fulham F.C. from 2007 to 2010 and Bayer 04 Leverkusen from 2013 to 2016.
