= Koo Bon-moo =

South Korean businessman (1945–2018)

- 구본무
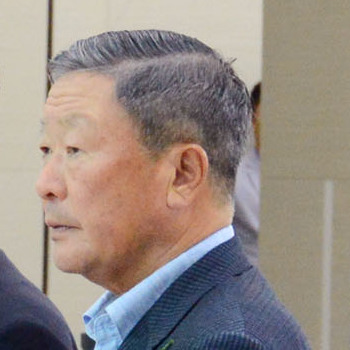
- Koo in 2013
- Born: 10 February 1945; Jinju, Korea, Empire of Japan
- Died: 20 May 2018 (aged 73); Seoul, South Korea
- Education: Yonsei University; Ashland University; Cleveland State University
- Years active: 1975–2018
- Title: Chairman of LG Group (1995–2018)
- Predecessor: Koo Cha-kyung (father) (1925–2019)
- Successor: Koo Kwang-mo (son)

Koo Bon-moo (Korean: 구본무; 10 February 1945 – 20 May 2018) was a South Korean business executive, who gained worldwide fame as the renamer and business executive of the LG Group.

== Early life ==
Born on 10 February 1945 in Jinju, Korea, Empire of Japan (now South Gyeongsang Province, South Korea), Koo enrolled at Yonsei University. He moved to Ohio and completed his bachelor's and master's degrees at Ashland University and Cleveland State University, respectively.

== Business career ==
Upon graduation from Cleveland State University, Koo returned to South Korea in 1975 and began working for Lucky Chemical, which later became LG Chem. He was transferred to GoldStar in 1980, and from 1983 to 1985, headed the company's Tokyo office. In 1995, Koo succeeded his father Koo Cha-kyung, the oldest son of LG's founder Koo In-hwoi as chairman of LG Group because of the Koo family's “male-only succession rule". Koo Bon-moo adopted his nephew Koo Kwang-mo in 2004, after losing his only son in 1994. Starting in 2017, Koo Bon-moo sought continual treatment for a brain tumor. He eventually ended medical treatment, and died in Seoul at a hospital on 20 May 2018, aged 73.
