= Moon Sung-hyun (baseball) =

South Korean baseball player (born 1991)

Moon Sung-Hyun
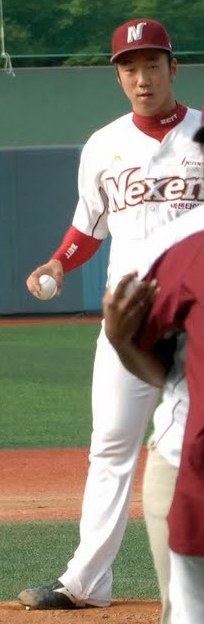

Kiwoom Heroes – No. 19
- Pitcher
- Born: November 9, 1991 (age 34)
- Bats: Right Throws: Right

KBO debut
- May 8, 2010, for the Nexen Heroes

KBO statistics (through May 29, 2024)
- Win–loss record: 24–35
- Earned run average: 4.86
- Strikeouts: 449
- Stats at Baseball Reference

Teams
- Nexen/Kiwoom Heroes (2010–2015, 2018–present); Sangmu Phoenix (2016–2017)

Moon Sung-Hyun (Korean: 문성현; born November 9, 1991, in Seoul) is a South Korean pitcher who plays for the Kiwoom Heroes in the KBO League. He bats and throws right-handed.

== Amateur career ==
Moon Sung-hyun attended Choongam High School in Seoul. In 2009, he had the best high school season, posting a 1.13 ERA and allowing only eight earned runs in 63 innings pitched. In April, Moon led his team to win the 2009 Golden Lion Flag National Championship, hurling 7.2 shutout innings in the final game, and was named MVP of the tournament. In June, Moon was selected as a member of the South Korean U-18 national team for the Asian Junior Baseball Championship held in Seoul, South Korea. In the championship, he had an excellent performance, going 2–0 with a 0.77 ERA and allowing only seven hits in 11.2 innings while striking out 16. Team Korea eventually won their third Asian championship and Moon won the MVP honors.

=== Notable international careers ===
Year	Venue	Competition	Team	Individual note
2009	South Korea	Asian Junior Championship	Gold medal	2-0, 0.77 ERA (3 G, 11.2 IP, 1 ER, 16 K); MVP

== Professional career ==
Moon made himself eligible for the 2010 KBO Draft and was selected as the 31st overall pick in the draft by the Nexen Heroes.

Moon started the 2010 season in the reserve league, but was called up in early May. He made his pro league debut on May 8 against the Hanwha Eagles at Mokdong Baseball Stadium, coming from the bullpen and tossing one scoreless inning of one-hit ball. In June, Moon was promoted into the Heroes' starting rotation.

He nearly became involved in a match-fixing scandal, but he refused and reported it voluntarily. On the other hand, Kim Sung-hyun, a former teammate, was convicted of match fixing while with the Nexen Heroes but was later released after concealing this fact and transferring to the LG Twins. He returned to Kagoshima Training Center without any problems after returning from Kagoshima, Japan, as a witness.
