= Kim Sung-hyun (baseball, born 1987) =

South Korean baseball player

Kim Seong-hyun

SSG Landers – No. 6
- Shortstop/Coach
- Born: March 9, 1987 (age 39); Gwangju, South Korea
- Bats: Right Throws: Right

KBO debut
- May 11, 2006, for the SK Wyverns

KBO statistics (through April 21, 2024)
- Batting average: .271
- Home runs: 44
- Runs batted in: 435
- Stats at Baseball Reference

Teams
- As player: SK Wyverns / SSG Landers (2006–2026); As coach: SSG Landers (2026–present)

- Kim Sung-hyun
- Hangul: 김성현
- Hanja: 金聖賢
- RR: Gim Seonghyeon
- MR: Kim Sŏnghyŏn
- IPA: [kim.sʰʌŋʝʌn]

Kim Seong-hyun (Korean: 김성현; born March 9, 1987) is a retired South Korean professional baseball infielder currently coaching for the SSG Landers of the KBO League

== Professional career ==
He was selected by the SK Wyverns in the 2007 Draft (held in 2006), as an infielder.

He served in the military in 2009–2010.

In 2014, he became a regular player at shortstop. He batted .284/.376/.377 with 113 hits, 5 home runs, 43 RBIs, and 6 SBs.

In 2015, he batted .297/.357/.408 with 118 hits, 5 home runs, 48 RBIs, and 1 SB. But he recorded 23 errors, so he prepare 2016 season to Second baseman.

Converted to second baseman In 2016, he came golden days. He batted .319/.366/.418 with 153 hits, 8 HRs, 65 RBIs, and 3 SBs. Because of slump in August, he didn't win Golden Glove.

2017, he batted .271/.335/.339 with 103 hits, 4 HRs, 29RBIs, and 2SBs. He recorded only 6 errors in 980 innings, became the best defensiver in 2B.

He finished the 2018 season batting .277/.336/.357 with 115 hits, 4 HRs, 55 RBIs, and 6 SBs.

In the 2018 postseason, he hit a 3-run home run in playoff Game 1. He batted .385/.500/.769 with 1 home run. He won the daily MVP in the 2018 Korean Series Game 5. Thanks to his performance, SK Wyverns defeated Doosan Bears.

He converted to shortstop again in 2019. He appeared in every game. He batted .246/.302/.300.
