= Koo Cha-kyung =

South Korean business executive (1925–2019)

- Born: April 24, 1925; Jinju, Korea, Empire of Japan
- Died: December 14, 2019 (aged 94)
- Known for: Chairman of LG Group
- Spouse: Ha Jeong-im (died 2008)
- Children: Six, including Koo Bon-moo (died 2018) and Koo Bon-neung
- Parent: Koo In-Hwoi

Korean name
- Hangul: 구자경
- Hanja: 具滋暻
- RR: Gu Jagyeong
- MR: Ku Chagyŏng

Koo Cha-kyung (Korean: 구자경; 24 April 1925 – 14 December 2019) was a South Korean business executive. He was the chairman of LG Group from 1970 until his retirement in 1995. He took the company public in 1970 and was chairman during the company's growth from 26 billion won to 30 trillion won.

== Life ==
Koo was born 24 April 1925 in Jinju, Korea, Empire of Japan to Koo In-Hwoi, who went on to found GoldStar and Lak Hui Chemical Industrial Corp, a plastics manufacturer and, later, a producer of toiletries.

Koo began his career at Lak Hui where he managed production lines for 20 years. The elder Koo died on 31 December 1969 and left the company to his son as chairman. He took the company public in 1970, the first privately held firm to go public.

During his tenure, the company's revenue increased significantly as it expanded globally across Asia, Europe and North America. In 1995, Koo Cha-kyung retired from the company and turned it over to his son, Koo Bon-moo. He had another son, Koo Bon-neung, as well.

Koo Cha-kyung died on 14 December 2019 at the age of 94.
