= Koo In-hwoi =

South Korean businessman; co-founder of LG Group

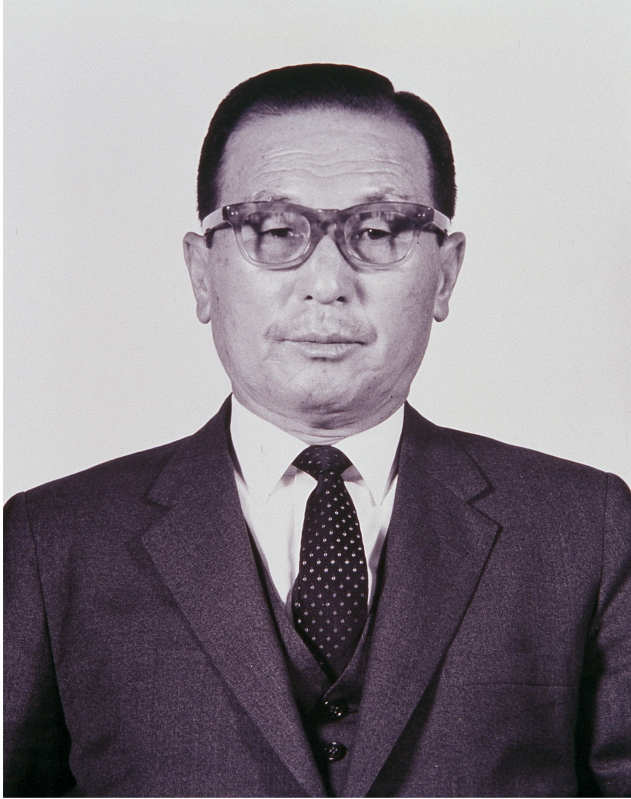
- Born: August 27, 1907; Jinju, South Gyeongsang Province, Korean Empire
- Died: December 31, 1969 (aged 62); Seoul, South Korea
- Known for: Co-founding LG Group
- Children: 10, including Koo Cha-kyung

Koo In-hwoi (Korean: 구인회; Hanja: 具仁會, 26 August 1906 – 31 December 1969) was a South Korean businessman and the co-founder of LG Group, one of the largest chaebols in South Korea.

== Life ==
Koo In-hwoi is the 14th generation descendant of Gu Sa-min (구사민; 具思閔), the younger brother of Gu Sa-maeng (구사맹; 具思孟) as well the uncle of Queen Inheon. Both of them were 12th generation descendants of Gu Seong-ro (구성로; 具成老), an officer who accompanied Yi Seong-gye during Wihwado Retreat.

After completing his secondary education at the Central Normal Higher School, Seoul in 1924, he soon made his start as a businessman. He returned to his hometown in 1926, and quickly went on to head the village's business cooperative union while also trading miscellaneous goods. The following year, he became head of the Dong-A Ilbo newspaper's branch office in Jisu. In 1931, he opened a store along with younger brother Koo Chul-hwoi in Jinju, South Gyeongsang. Things didn't go as planned, and it suffered huge losses. But instead of taking that first defeat to heart, he tried again by getting loans while putting up the family's property as collateral. His fortune began to build as a result of this trial and error.

As his businesses gradually expanded, in 1941 he made a sizeable contribution to the Korean provisional government in Shanghai through an independence fighter who visited him. His father had done the same a decade earlier, when he donated to the famous Korean independence fighter Kim Ku. When Korea regained its independence, he started to focus on expanding his businesses by relocating to Busan and beginning to import charcoal. His company became the first in the country to receive trade approval from the U.S. Army Ministry Government in Korea.

It was around this time that a relative of his wife, Huh Man-jung, visited him with his eldest son Huh Joon-gu, who had just returned from studying in Japan. The elder Huh asked if he could invest in his business in exchange for showing Huh's son the ropes of the business world. This was the beginning of the business partnership between the two families that lasted for decades. Not long after, he decided to accept his younger brother Koo Jung-hwoi's advice and started a cosmetics manufacturing business. This was the moment that today's LG Group was born. The group's first truly successful business, Lak Hui Chemical Industrial Corporation, opened in 1947. It began selling a new face cream called Lucky, which quickly sold out despite its relatively high price thanks to its high-quality ingredients. But though sales were soaring, because of a big problem with the cream's lid, many people were returning the product.

His solution was to use plastic for the lid, even though the material wasn't common in Korea. In September 1952, he opened a plastics plant in Busan and started manufacturing plastic hairbrushes, which also became a huge hit. Within two months, he had to add additional manufacturing machines to meet explosive demand, and also started making new products like toothbrushes and washbowls. In 1953 he succeeded in establishing Lak Hui Industrial Co. Ltd. But his ambitions didn't stop there. In 1958, he started Goldstar, which later became LG Electronics. Goldstar immediately began developing a radio, and in 1959, Korea's first homemade radio started rolling off the production line. He then started producing phones, fans, air conditioners, TVs, and refrigerators. He also produced Lucky Sodo toothpaste, toothbrush, soap and synthetic detergent for the first time in Korea. On the other hand, he was president of Busan International Newspaper and Federation of Korean Industries.

Koo In-hwoi died at his home in Seoul, South Korea, on December 31, 1969. He was 62.
