= ABCA/Rawlings High School All-America Baseball Team =

Baseball award

The ABCA/Rawlings High School All-America Baseball Team has been named by the American Baseball Coaches Association every year since 1969, with the exceptions of 1993 and 2020. Between 1971–1975 and in 2000, only one team was selected per year. In 1969–1970, 1976 and 1987, two teams were selected per year. Each team has consisted of between 10 and 26 players at various designated positions.

As of 2026, Cherry Creek High School in Colorado, Farragut High School in Tennessee, Parkview High School in Georgia and Stillwater High School in Oklahoma have each had nine selections to the team, more than any other school. California has had more selections and more than twice as many First Team selections as any other state, with 340 and 151 respectively.

Forty-four players have been named to the team twice. Bill McGuire of Creighton Preparatory School was the first to accomplish the feat in 1981 and 1982. As of 2026, Tripp MacKay, Joey Gallo, Jack Flaherty, Jace Bohrofen, Druw Jones and Seth Hernandez, Gio Rojas and Malachi Washington are the only players to be named to the First Team twice.

In 2001, Casey Kotchman and John Killalea of Seminole High School became the first pair of high school teammates to be named to the First Team in the same year. Scott Kazmir and Clint Everts of Cypress Falls High School accomplished the same feat in the following year. Adrian Cárdenas and Chris Marrero of Monsignor Edward Pace High School followed in 2006 and Seth Hernandez and Ethan Schiefelbein of Corona High School followed in 2024.

Ten honorees have gone on to be enshrined in the National Baseball Hall of Fame and Museum while eight have been inducted into the National College Baseball Hall of Fame. John Elway of Granada Hills High School is enshrined in the Pro Football Hall of Fame and Condredge Holloway of Lee High School is enshrined in the Canadian Football Hall of Fame.

Eighteen selectees have later won a Major League Baseball (MLB) Most Valuable Player Award, nine players have won a Cy Young Award. As highly touted prospects, 24 players have subsequently been selected first overall in the MLB draft and twelve have won an MLB Rookie of the Year Award.

Eighteen players named to one of the three teams have played football professionally, including Josh Booty, Chad Hutchinson and Drew Henson who played in both the National Football League and MLB. Ryan Minor of Hammon High School in Hammon, Oklahoma played professional basketball and in MLB. Scott Burrell of Hamden High School is the only honoree to go on to play basketball in the National Basketball Association.

Before being sponsored by Rawlings, the team was sponsored by Topps and Converse.

== Key ==
‡	Member of the National Baseball Hall of Fame and Major League Baseball All-Star
^	MLB Most Valuable Player or Cy Young Award-winner and All-Star
*	Major League Baseball All-Star
^{#}	First overall Major League Baseball draft pick
^{G}	Gatorade High School Baseball Player of the Year Award winner
^{B}	Baseball America High School Player of the Year Award winner
°	Player played a different sport professionally

== Teams ==
=== 1969–1979 ===
Year	Position	First team		Second team		Third team		Ref
Year	Position	Player	High school (state)	Player	High school (state)	Player	High school (state)	Ref
1969	Catcher	Terry McDermott	St. Agnes (NY)	Gene Holbert	Palmyra (PA)	No team selected		
1969	First base	Mike Anderson	Timmonsville (SC)	Jim Baxley	Enterprise (CA)	No team selected		
1969	Second base	Fred Frazier	Hoover (CA)	Bill O'Connor	Mt. Miguel (CA)	No team selected		
1969	Third base	Ted Nicholson	Oak Park (MS)	Lester Spikes	Central Memorial (LA)	No team selected		
1969	Shortstop	Alan Bannister	Kennedy (CA)	Mike Phillips	MacArthur (TX)	No team selected		
1969	Outfield	Jeff Burroughs^^{#}	Wilson (CA)	Jim Johnson	Brandywine (MI)	No team selected		
1969	Outfield	Alvin McGrew	Parker (AL)	Kent Burdick	Parker (WI)	No team selected		
1969	Outfield	Dave Chorley	Millikan (CA)	Richard Soriano	Hialeah (FL)	No team selected		
1969	Pitcher	Jim Richard*	Lincoln (LA)	Don Stanhouse*	DuQuoin (IL)	No team selected		
1969	Pitcher	Randall Sterling	Key West (FL)	Bob May	Merritt Island (FL)	No team selected		
1970	Catcher	Michael Ivie^{#}	Walker (GA)	Barry Foote	Smithfield-Selma (NC)	No team selected		
1970	First base	Dan Briggs	Sonora (CA)	Kenneth Waiss	DePew (NY)	No team selected		
1970	Second base	Dale Holland	Riverview (FL)	Jerry Hairston	Gardendale (AL)	No team selected		
1970	Third base	Charles Maxwell	Miami Trace (OH)	Jimmie Hacker	Temple (TX)	No team selected		
1970	Shortstop	Kenneth Pape	MacArthur (TX)	Gary Polczynski	Hale (WI)	No team selected		
1970	Outfield	Darnell Ford	Fremont (CA)	Art DeFilippis	Catholic (CT)	No team selected		
1970	Outfield	Burnel Flowers	Courter Tech (OH)	Fred Wegner	Fresno (CA)	No team selected		
1970	Outfield	Ronald Kinner	Dunbar (TX)	Price Thomas	Shaw (AL)	No team selected		
1970	Pitcher	James Martin	Olympia (SC)	James Haller	Creighton Prep (NE)	No team selected		
1970	Pitcher	Randy Scarbery	Roosevelt (CA)	David Cheadle, Jr.	Asheville (NC)	No team selected		
1971	Catcher	Danny Goodwin^{#}	Peoria Central (IL)	No team selected		No team selected		
1971	First base	Ed Kurpiel	Molloy (NY)	No team selected		No team selected		
1971	Second base	Richard Puig	Hillsborough (FL)	No team selected		No team selected		
1971	Third base	Thomas Bianco	Sewanhaka (NY)	No team selected		No team selected		
1971	Shortstop	Condredge Holloway°	Lee (AL)	No team selected		No team selected		
1971	Outfield	Terry Whitfield	Palo Verde (CA)	No team selected		No team selected		
1971	Outfield	James Rice^{‡}^	Hanna (SC)	No team selected		No team selected		
1971	Outfield	Ronald Williamson	Asher (OK)	No team selected		No team selected		
1971	Pitcher	Roy Branch	Beaumont (MO)	No team selected		No team selected		
1971	Pitcher	Roy Thomas	Lompoc (CA)	No team selected		No team selected		
1972	Catcher	Bobbie D. Goodman	Bishop Byrne (TN)	No team selected		No team selected		
1972	Infield	Ellis C. Valentine*	Crenshaw (CA)	No team selected		No team selected		
1972	Infield	Rickey D. White	Fresno (CA)	No team selected		No team selected		
1972	Infield	Roy Lee Howell*	Lompoc (CA)	No team selected		No team selected		
1972	Infield	Richard T. Manning	La Salle (NY)	No team selected		No team selected		
1972	Outfield	Cleo H. Kilpatrick	Washington (OK)	No team selected		No team selected		
1972	Outfield	Mike Ondina	Cordova (CA)	No team selected		No team selected		
1972	Outfield	Stephen Englishbey	S. Houston (TX)	No team selected		No team selected		
1972	Pitcher	Larry Christenson	Marysville (WA)	No team selected		No team selected		
1972	Pitcher	Scott H. McGregor*	El Segundo (CA)	No team selected		No team selected		
1973	Catcher	Ted Farr	Shadle Park (WA)	No team selected		No team selected		
1973	Infield	Mickey Reichenbach	Taylor (TX)	No team selected		No team selected		
1973	Infield	Augie Juricic	Joliet (IL)	No team selected		No team selected		
1973	Infield	Gary Roenicke	Edgewood (CA)	No team selected		No team selected		
1973	Infield	Robin Yount^{‡}^	Taft (CA)	No team selected		No team selected		
1973	Outfield	Bill Taylor	Savannah (GA)	No team selected		No team selected		
1973	Outfield	Bruce Tonascia	Napa (CA)	No team selected		No team selected		
1973	Outfield	Lee Mazzilli*	Lincoln (NY)	No team selected		No team selected		
1973	Pitcher	Dave Clyde^{#}	Westchester (TX)	No team selected		No team selected		
1973	Pitcher	George Kunkler	Lindbergh (MO)	No team selected		No team selected		
1974	Catcher	Dale Murphy^	Wilson (OR)	No team selected		No team selected		
1974	Infield	James Del Vecchio	Warde (CT)	No team selected		No team selected		
1974	Infield	Lance Parrish*	Walnut (CA)	No team selected		No team selected		
1974	Infield	Ron Sorey	Dayton (OH)	No team selected		No team selected		
1974	Infield	Rick Sutcliffe*	Van Horn (MO)	No team selected		No team selected		
1974	Outfield	Lonnie Smith*	Centennial (CA)	No team selected		No team selected		
1974	Outfield	Kevin Drake	Cabrillo (CA)	No team selected		No team selected		
1974	Outfield	Willie Wilson*	Summit (NJ)	No team selected		No team selected		
1974	Pitcher	Larry Monroe	Forest View (IL)	No team selected		No team selected		
1974	Pitcher	Steve Reid	Wayne (IN)	No team selected		No team selected		
1974	Pitcher	Tom Boggs	Lanier (TX)	No team selected		No team selected		
1975	Catcher	Al Benton	Godby (FL)	No team selected		No team selected		
1975	Infield	Rocky Alburtis	Monterey (TX)	No team selected		No team selected		
1975	Infield	Walter Podgurski	Union (NJ)	No team selected		No team selected		
1975	Infield	Arthur Miles	Crocket (TX)	No team selected		No team selected		
1975	Infield	Jim Anderson	Kennedy (CA)	No team selected		No team selected		
1975	Outfield	Les Filkins	Washington (IL)	No team selected		No team selected		
1975	Outfield	Brian Rosinski	Evanston (IL)	No team selected		No team selected		
1975	Outfield	Clint Hurdle	Merritt Island (FL)	No team selected		No team selected		
1975	Pitcher	Mike Lentz	Juanita (WA)	No team selected		No team selected		
1975	Pitcher	Pat Gillie	Alhambra (AZ)	No team selected		No team selected		
1976	Catcher	Tim Glass	Springfield South (OH)	Osvaldo Virgil*	Moon Valley (AZ)	No team selected		
1976	First base	Leon Durham*	Woodward (OH)	Joe Keith Isaacs	Asher (OK)	No team selected		
1976	Infield	Alan Trammell^{‡}	Kearny (CA)	Roberto Alvarez	Miami Carol City (FL)	No team selected		
1976	Infield	Mark Kuecker	Brenham (TX)	D'Aloin James	Madison Township (NJ)	No team selected		
1976	Infield	James Allen	Yakima Davis (WA)	Michael Allen Kopsky	Christian Brothers (MO)	No team selected		
1976	Outfield	William Simpson	Lakewood (CA)	Jeff Kraus	Colerain (OH)	No team selected		
1976	Outfield	Pat Tabler*	McNicholas (OH)	Paul Householder	North Haven (CT)	No team selected		
1976	Outfield	Tom Thurberg	Weymouth South (MA)	Dana Drisko	North Syracuse (NY)	No team selected		
1976	Pitcher	Pat Underwood	Kokomo (IN)	Bruce Hurst*	Dixie (UT)	No team selected		
1976	Pitcher	Bill Bordley	Bishop Montgomery (CA)	Ben Grzybek	Hialeah (FL)	No team selected		
1976	Pitcher	Steve Trout	Thornwood (IL)	William Scherrer	Cardinal O'Hara (NY)	No team selected		
1977	Catcher	Dave Hodgins	Buchser (CA)	Ray Corbett	Samuel Clemens (TX)	Gerry Groninger	Green Mountain (CO)	
1977	First base	Harold Baines^{‡}^{#}	St. Michaels (MD)	Stan Davis	Halifax County (VA)	Bruce LaHay	Oakville (MO)	
1977	Second base	Walt Backman	Aloha (OR)	Tom Goffena	Sidney (OH)	Daryl Hill	Peterson (CA)	
1977	Third base	Tad Venger	Hart (CA)	Kyle Keahey	La Junta (CO)	Paul Gallagher	Pennsburg (PA)	
1977	Shortstop	Dave Hibner	Howell (MI)	Jose Castro	Miami Jackson (FL)	David Brooks	Blanchard (OK)	
1977	Outfield	Paul Croft	Morristown (NJ)	Brian Greer	Sonora (CA)	Leo Koralik	Weber (IL)	
1977	Outfield	Craig Landis	Vintage (CA)	Anthony Nicely	Meadowdale (OH)	Bill Kuchar	Hamden (CT)	
1977	Outfield	Kevin Bass*	Menlo (CA)	Bruce Compton	Norman (OK)	David Henderson*	Dos Palos (CA)	
1977	Pitcher	Andrew Madden	New Hartford (NY)	Tom Mullen	Central (IA)	Kevin Richardson	Roosevelt (MI)	
1977	Pitcher	William Gullickson	Joliet Catholic (IL)	Ricky Wright	Paris (TX)	Mike Jones	Sutherland (NY)	
1977	Pitcher	Richard Barnes	Lake Worth (FL)	Richard Dotson*	Anderson (OH)	David Flattery	St. Edmond (IA)	
1978	Catcher	Brian Milner	Southwest (TX)	Nick Hernandez	Hialeah (FL)	Dave Valle	Holy Cross (NY)	
1978	First base	Lloyd Moseby*	Oakland Tech (CA)	Mike Marshall*	Buffalo Grove (IL)	Harry Weaver	Eldorado (NM)	
1978	Second base	Mike Woodard	Proviso East (IL)	Rex Hudler	Bullard (CA)	Nick Esasky	Miami Carol City (FL)	
1978	Third base	Phil Lansford	Wilcox (CA)	Brian Giles	Kearny (CA)	Don Alcorn	Aurora Central (CO)	
1978	Shortstop	Bud Biancalana	Redwood (CA)	Kevin Martin	Falconer Central (NY)	Leonardo Faedo	Jefferson (FL)	
1978	Outfield	Tito Nanni	Chestnut Hill (PA)	Darryl Motley	Grant (OR)	Ruben Luna	Southwestern (MI)	
1978	Outfield	Mark Ryal	Dewar (OK)	Melvin Hall	Port Byron (NY)	David Leeper	Villa Park (CA)	
1978	Outfield	Tom Brunansky*	West Covina (CA)	Paul Summers	Oakville (MO)	Kean Rich	Washington (IA)	
1978	Pitcher	Mike Morgan*	Valley (NV)	Steve Raine	North Salinas (CA)	Johnny Moses	Bellaire (TX)	
1978	Pitcher	Melton Hawkins	Midway (TX)	Brian Ryder	Schrewsbury (MA)	Kevin Clinton	Wichita Southeast (KS)	
1978	Pitcher	Tim Conroy	Gateway (CA)	Mike Martinez	Pueblo East (CO)	Rip Rollins	Alleghany (NC)	
1979	Catcher	Jay Schroeder°	Palisades (CA)	John Mizerock	Punxsutawney (PA)	Ed Vosberg	Salpointe (AZ)	
1979	First base	Joe Lansford	Wilcox (CA)	Todd Demeter	U. S. Grant (OK)	Steve Chapman	Murray (UT)	
1979	Second base	Steve Buechele	Senite (CA)	Mike Kwiecinski	Cousino (MI)	Jim Heuring	St. Michael (MN)	
1979	Third base	Shane Allen	Palm Bay (FL)	John Brown	Crenshaw (CA)	Greg Gagne	Somerset (MA)	
1979	Shortstop	Juan Bustabad	Hialeah-Miami Lakes (FL)	Randy Kutcher	Palmdale (CA)	Jordan Berge	Pueblo East (CO)	
1979	Outfield	Albert Chambers^{#}	John Harris (PA)	Kevin Brandt	Nekoosa (WI)	Chris Rehbaum	St. Joseph's (NY)	
1979	Outfield	Brad Komminsk	Shawnee (OH)	Chris Baker	Livonia Franklin (MI)	Ron Shepherd	Kilgore (TX)	
1979	Outfield	Andrew Van Slyke*	New Hartford (NY)	John Elway°	Granada Hills (CA)	Oscar Burnett	Moravia (NY)	
1979	Pitcher	John Bohnet	Hogan (CA)	Scott Garrelts*	Buckley-Loda (IL)	Lon Olejniczak	Decorah (IA)	
1979	Pitcher	Jeff Bettendorf	Cabrillo (CA)	Bob Gunnarsson	Lake Havasu (AZ)	Charles Crimm	Thousand Oaks (CA)	
1979	Pitcher	Richard Leucken	Spring Woods (TX)	Scott Glanz	Edison (OK)	Frank Osmulski	Summit (NJ)	

=== 1980–1989 ===
Year	Position	First team		Second team		Third team		Ref
Year	Position	Player	High school (state)	Player	High school (state)	Player	High school (state)	Ref
1980	Catcher	Jeff Reed	Joliet West (IL)	John Gibbons	MacArthur (TX)	Ross Kingsley	Janesville (WI)	
1980	First base	Ken Kinnard	Claremore (OK)	Jay Reid	Lynwood (CA)	Peter Yates	Newburport (MA)	
1980	Second base	Rhett Whisman	Fairfield (OH)	David Miley	Chamberlain (FL)	Tim Brecht	Norway (IA)	
1980	Third base	Roger Hansen	Rio Mesa (CA)	David Pagel	Sunside (AZ)	Bruce Seid	Oak Park (MI)	
1980	Shortstop	Darrell Coles	Eisenhower (CA)	Kelly Gruber*	Westlake (TX)	Doug Baylor	St. Mark's (DE)	
1980	Utility	Jay Tibbs	Huffman (AL)	Dion James	McClatchy (CA)	Chad Loupee	Washington (IA)	
1980	Outfield	Garry Harris	Hoover (CA)	Keith Lovellette	Taconic (MA)	John Schuessler	Thomas Jefferson (TX)	
1980	Outfield	Jeff Williams	Princeton (OH)	Andy Ponseigo	Arapahoe (CO)	Mark Reynolds	Wichita Southeast (KS)	
1980	Outfield	Cecil Espy	Point Loma (CA)	Orlando Villarreal	Wyoming Park (MI)	Ed McMillan	Xavier (CT)	
1980	Pitcher	Brian Fisher	Hinkley (CO)	Dan Collins	Newport News (VA)	Jeff Horne	White Oak (NC)	
1980	Pitcher	Tim Maki	Carroll (IN)	Pat Clements	Pleasant Valley (CA)	Ed Leuppe	Littleton (CO)	
1980	Pitcher	Don Schulze	Lake Park (IL)	Ron Robinson	Woodlake (CA)	Jody Johnson	Franklin (NY)	
1981	Catcher	Kevin Burrell	Poway (CA)	John Marzano	Central (PA)	David Lelievre	Waltham (MA)	
1981	First base	Todd Benzinger	New Richmond (OH)	Jeff Lauck	McLane (CA)	Steve Berlin	Cherry Creek (CO)	
1981	Second base	Chris Howard	Boone (FL)	Leon Roberts*	Skyline (CA)	John Kanter	Camelback (AZ)	
1981	Third base	David Cochrane	Troy (CA)	Brendan Hennessy	Bogota (NJ)	Greg McClain	Pasadena (CA)	
1981	Shortstop	Dick Schofield	Springfield Griffin (IL)	Randy Whisler	Klamath Union (OR)	Tom Duggan	Edison (CA)	
1981	Utility	Bill McGuire	Creighton Prep (NE)	Scott Fromwiller	Davison (MI)	W. Scott Pleis	Wentzville (MO)	
1981	Outfield	George Alpert	Livingston (NJ)	Jeff Bassett	South (OH)	Mike Land	Concord (DE)	
1981	Outfield	Darrin Jackson	Culver City (CA)	Stan Palmore	Chicago Vocational (IL)	Greg Morhardt	Gilbert (CT)	
1981	Outfield	Daryl Boston	Woodward (OH)	Jeff Koenigsman	Creighton Prep (NE)	Shawn Sullivan	Bowie (MD)	
1981	Pitcher	Mark Grant	Joliet Catholic (IL)	Bill Babock	Grosse Pointe North (MI)	Ricky Barlow	Woodville (TX)	
1981	Pitcher	Vance Lovelace	Hillsborough (FL)	Tony Ferreira	North Riverside (CA)	Mark Gubicza*	Penn Charter (PA)	
1982	Catcher	Ron Karkovice	Boone (FL)	Juan Velazquez	Hialeah-Miami Lakes (FL)	Bill McGuire (2)	Creighton Prep (NE)	
1982	First base	Sam Horn	Morse (CA)	Bill Clark*	Jesuit (LA)	Mike Hill	Lakewood (CO)	
1982	Second base	Shawon Dunston*^{#}	Thomas Jefferson (NY)	Barry Larkin^{‡}^	Moeller (OH)	Lance Lincoln	Pullman (WA)	
1982	Third base	Dale Sveum	Pinole Valley (CA)	Michael Greenwell*	North Fort Myers (FL)	Bob Witt	Canton (MA)	
1982	Shortstop	Sam Khalifa	Sahuaro (AZ)	Joe Dunlap	Haskell (OK)	Jeff Hamilton	Carman (MI)	
1982	Utility	Robert Jones	Proviso East (IL)	Dave Otto	Elk Grove (IL)	Chris Knabenshue	Smoky Hill (CO)	
1982	Outfield	Barry Bonds^	Serra (CA)	Marc Washington	Northwestern (MI)	Jim Davins	Notre Dame (CT)	
1982	Outfield	Ken Williams	Mount Pleasant (CA)	Mark Davis	Hoover (CA)	Rodney Carter°	Elizabeth (NJ)	
1982	Outfield	Willie Boderick	Robinson (FL)	Steve Capell	Los Alamos (NM)	Steve Pollock	North Syracuse (NY)	
1982	Pitcher	Jimmy Jones	Thomas Jefferson (TX)	Richard Monteleone	Tampa Catholic (FL)	Robert Parkins	Cerritos (CA)	
1982	Pitcher	Robert Kipper	Aurora Central Catholic (IL)	David Wells*	Point Loma (CA)	Allan Anderson	Lancaster (OH)	
1983	Catcher	Matt Stark	Los Altos (CA)	Joe Oliver	Boone (FL)	Mark Machtolf	Gonzaga (WA)	
1983	First base	Paul Ricky Jordan	Grant (CA)	Boris King	Palm Springs (CA)	Psul Fuller	Leo (IL)	
1983	Second base	Todd Mabe	Edison (CA)	George Threadgill	Whiteville (NC)	Elanis Westbrooks	Bellaire (TX)	
1983	Third base	Eddie Williams	Hoover (CA)	Tim Zapolski	Boulder City (NV)	John Toale	Tarauella (FL)	
1983	Shortstop	Kurt Stillwell*	Thousand Oaks (CA)	Marcus Lawton	Harrison Central (MS)	Webster Garrison	Ehret (LA)	
1983	Utility	John Toale	Tarauella (FL)	Randall Strijek	Draper (NY)	Carl Jenkins	Yonkers (NY)	
1983	Outfield	Gary Thurman	North Central (IN)	Rex Blackwell	Colton (CA)	Chris Forgione	Salesianum (DE)	
1983	Outfield	Curt Parham	Thornridge (IL)	Paul Thoutsis	Worcester (MA)	Paul Murphy	Ardsley (NY)	
1983	Outfield	Ron DeLucchi	Campolindo (CA)	Geoff Petersen	Clovis West (CA)	Drew Stratton	Quabbin Regional (MA)	
1983	Pitcher	Brian Holman	Wichita North (KS)	Mike Greer	Valley (NV)	John Kuester	Norway (IA)	
1983	Pitcher	Jackie Davidson	Everman (TX)	Mike Pavelka	Hopkins (MN)	Wayne Dotson	Estacado (TX)	
1983	Pitcher	Joel Davis	Sandalwood (FL)	David West	Craigmont (TN)	Stan Fansler	Elkins (WV)	
1984	Catcher	Erik Pappas	Mount Carmel (IL)	Chris Olson	Medford (MA)	Dave Sturdivant	Cherry Creek (CO)	
1984	First base	Howard Freiling	Northeast (PA)	Rex Peters	Cherry Creek (CO)	Brandon Bailey	Hanna (SC)	
1984	Second base	Isaiah Clark	Crockett (TX)	Terry Green	Springtown (OK)	Ted Holcomb	Westchester (CA)	
1984	Third base	Luis de los Santos	Newtown (NY)	Tim Scott	Hanford (CA)	Scott Livingstone	Lake Highlands (TX)	
1984	Shortstop	Jay Bell*	Tate (FL)	Darin Grimes	Wichita North (KS)	Greg Jefferies*	Serra (CA)	
1984	Utility	Thomas Glavine^{‡}^	Billerica (MA)	Mark Kramer	Bremen (IL)	Chris Jones	Liverpool (NY)	
1984	Outfield	Tom Hartley	Hudson's Bay (WA)	Angelo Cuevas	Aviation (NY)	Robert Bell	Gardena (CA)	
1984	Outfield	Andrew Denson	Purcell Marian (OH)	Greg Selvera	Omaha Northwest (NE)	Tony Gray	Hopkins (MN)	
1984	Outfield	Shawn Abner^{#}	Mechanicsburg (PA)	Marc Wolever	Lewis Central (IA)	Richard Leigh	DeSoto (TX)	
1984	Pitcher	Tony Menendez	American (FL)	Peter Smith	Burlington (MA)	Curt Krippner	Cypress Creek (TX)	
1984	Pitcher	Greg Maddux^{‡}^	Valley (NV)	Kevin Garner	Brazoswood (TX)	David Haas	Truman (MO)	
1984	Pitcher	Al Leiter*	Central Regional (NJ)	Anthony Lee	Garner (NC)	Al Ashmont	Union Catholic (NJ)	
1985	Catcher	Kurt Brown	Glendora (CA)	Greg David	Barron Collier (FL)	Mark Harpenaw	St. Mary's (IA)	
1985	First base	Tino Martinez*	Jefferson (FL)	Al Martin	Rowland (CA)	Dan Didito	Waltham (MA)	
1985	Second base	Mark Cole	Kennedy (CA)	Rod Murrell	Skyline (TX)	Jeff Connors	Niwot (CO)	
1985	Third base	Bill St. Peter	Bay City Western (MI)	Bryn Kosco	Poland Seminary (OH)	Ed Toledo	Boulder (CO)	
1985	Shortstop	Greg Jefferies* (2)	Serra (CA)	Greg Smith	Glenelg (MD)	Brian McRae	Manatee (FL)	
1985	Utility	Gregg Olson*	Omaha Northwest (NE)	Anthony Balabon	Conestoga (PA)	Chris Bacon	New Trier (IL)	
1985	Outfield	Glen Braxton	Idabel (OK)	Kevin Batiste	Ball (TX)	Mike Moreland	Pascagoula (MS)	
1985	Outfield	Ricky Epps	Kildare (TX)	Brian Crowley	Newington (CT)	Brad Shoemaker	Prospect (IL)	
1985	Outfield	Steve Davis	Plano (TX)	John Viera	Miami Southridge (FL)	Shon Ashley	Meridian (ID)	
1985	Pitcher	Tommy Greene	Whiteville (NC)	Jeff Baumgarner	Hanford (WA)	Dan Johnston	Regis (IA)	
1985	Pitcher	Toby Nivens	McAllen (TX)	Dan Gabriele	Walled Lake Western (MI)	Clint Zavaras	Mullen Prep (CO)	
1985	Pitcher	Brian Dubois	Reed Custer (IL)	Ricky Rojas	Hialeah-Miami Lakes (FL)	Daniel McConaghy	La Salle (RI)	
1986	Catcher	Derek Parks	Montclair (CA)	Phil Clark	Crockett (TX)	Jeff Grey	Santana (CA)	
1986	First base	DeWain Stevens	Lawrence (KS)	Reggie Jefferson	Leon (FL)	Mike Bell	Newton (NJ)	
1986	Infield	Patrick Lennon	Whiteville (NC)	Brian Champion	Corvallis (OR)	Harvey Pullman	McAteer (CA)	
1986	Infield	Anthony Clements	Don Lugo (CA)	Kraig Washington	Diamond Bar (CA)	Darryl Robinson	Whitney Young (IL)	
1986	Infield	Gary Sheffield*^{G}	Hillsborough (FL)	Bryan Foster	North Central (IN)	Pat Woods	Central (AL)	
1986	Utility	Brian Johnson	Skyline (CA)	Reggie Stalzer	Marshalltown (IA)	Darren Hidder	Washington (IA)	
1986	Outfield	Lee May Jr.	Purcell Marian (OH)	Mike White	Loudon (TN)	Chris Graves	Brenham (TX)	
1986	Outfield	Greg McMurtry°	Brockton (MA)	Terrence Carr	James Bennett (MD)	Carl Sullivan	Brenham (TX)	
1986	Outfield	Derrick May	Newark (DE)	William Taylor	Alexander (LA)	Manny Alvarez	George Washington (NY)	
1986	Outfield	Kevin Dean	Hogan (CA)	Karl Rhodes	Western Hill (OH)	Keith Thomas	Kenwood (IL)	
1986	Pitcher	Kent Mercer	Dublin (OH)	Mike Moscrey	Thomas Jefferson (TX)	Roger Pavlik*	Aldine (TX)	
1986	Pitcher	Daryl Green	Nacogdoches (TX)	Jamie McAndrew	Ponderosa (CO)	David Howell	Swampscott (MA)	
1986	Pitcher	Scott Scudder	Prairiland (TX)	Allen Rath	Highland (IA)	David Howell	Swampscott (MA)	
1987	Catcher	Mike Urman	Canoga Park (CA)	Bill Henderson	Westminster Christian (FL)	No team selected		
1987	First base	Matt Franco	Westlake (CA)	Mark Healy	Creighton Prep (NE)	No team selected		
1987	Infield	Jeremy Matthews	Sandalwood (FL)	Travis Fryman*	Tate (FL)	No team selected		
1987	Infield	Tom Redington	Esperanza (CA)	Delino Deshields	Seaford (DE)	No team selected		
1987	Infield	Rick Lantrip	Golden West (CA)	Mike Wall	Norwood (MA)	No team selected		
1987	Utility	Brian Bohannon	North Shore (TX)	Chuck Ricci	Shawnee (NJ)	No team selected		
1987	Outfield	Mark Merchant	Oviedo (FL)	Steve Pegues	Pontotoc (MS)	No team selected		
1987	Outfield	Ken Griffey Jr.^{‡}^^{#}	Moeller (OH)	Dave Zancanaro	Del Campo (CA)	No team selected		
1987	Outfield	Don Carroll	Granite Hills (CA)	Chris Threadgill	Whiteville (NC)	No team selected		
1987	Outfield	Lee Tinsley	Shelbyville (KY)	Mike Seda	Shadow Mountain (AZ)	No team selected		
1987	Pitcher	Willie Banks^{G}	St. Anthony (NJ)	Brian Knackert	Ocean View (CA)	No team selected		
1987	Pitcher	Chris Myers	H.B. Plant (FL)	Dave Fleming	Mahopac (NY)	No team selected		
1987	Pitcher	Chris Myers	H.B. Plant (FL)	Dan Wilson*	Barrington (IL)	No team selected		
1988	Catcher	Troy Tallman	Napa (CA)	Tim Hodge	Callaway (MS)	Todd Winston	Marysville (MI)	
1988	First base	Joe Ciccarella	Mater Dei (CA)	Steve Dunn	Robinson (VA)	Nick Delvecchio	Natick (MA)	
1988	Second base	Doug Saunders	Esperanza (CA)	Brent Gates	Grandville (MI)	Rob White	Brewer (ME)	
1988	Third base	Roger Burnett	Broken Arrow (OK)	Scott Craven	Punahou (HI)	Jeff Caldara	Ardsley (NY)	
1988	Shortstop	Mark Lewis^{G}	Hamilton (OH)	Bill Parese	Owasso (OK)	Ricky Gutierrez	American (FL)	
1988	Utility	Lawrence Gilligan	Lakeland Regional (NJ)	Hilly Hathaway	Sandalwood (FL)	Frank Mochak	Chicopee (MA)	
1988	Designated hitter	Jon Zuber	Campolindo (CA)	Ken Munoz	Suffern (NY)	Brad Cohen	Starkville (MS)	
1988	Outfield	Wendell Ansley	Plainview (TX)	Rex McMackin	Chatsworth (CA)	Luis Sierra	A.I. duPont (DE)	
1988	Outfield	Hugh Walker	Jacksonville (AR)	Chris Hart	Harrisonburg (VA)	Troy Bailey	T.C. Williams (VA)	
1988	Outfield	Derrick Warren	Washington (FL)	Bill Ashley	Belleville (MI)	Bob Scott	Mankato West (MN)	
1988	Pitcher	Alex Fernandez	Pace (FL)	Ben Howze	Washington (FL)	Jeff Juden	Salem (MA)	
1988	Pitcher	Steve Avery*	John F. Kennedy (MI)	Arthur Rhodes*	La Vega (TX)	Steve Worrell	Lower Cape May Regional (NJ)	
1988	Pitcher	Rico Brogna	Watertown (CT)	Scott Ray Davison	Redondo Union (CA)	Doug Bennett	Hillcrest (MO)	
1989	Catcher	Tyler Houston	Valley (NV)	Charles Johnson	Westwood (FL)	Casey Burrill	Hart (CA)	
1989	First base	Bo Dodson	Christian Brothers (CA)	Scott Pugh	Abilene (TX)	Brian Sackinsky	South Park (PA)	
1989	Second base	George Virgilio	Elizabeth (NJ)	Chris Wimmer	Wichita East (KS)	Ted Corbin	Barron Collier (FL)	
1989	Third base	Rich Aude	Chatsworth (CA)	Calvin Murray	White (TX)	T.R. Lewis	Sandalwood (FL)	
1989	Shortstop	Scott Bream	Millard South (NE)	Willie Greene	Jones County (GA)	Chris Buzzi	Bethel Park (PA)	
1989	Utility	Earl Cunningham	Lancaster (SC)	Dan Melendez	St. Bernard (CA)	Doug Mirabelli	Valley (NV)	
1989	Designated hitter	Brook Fordyce	St. Bernard (CT)	Steve Hegan	South Pontotoc (MS)	Jim Wilke	Portage (IN)	
1989	Outfield	Greg Blosser	Sarasota (FL)	Bill Lott	Petal (MS)	Jason Robertson	Hillcrest (IL)	
1989	Outfield	Paul Coleman	Frankston (TX)	Jeff Hammonds*	Scotch Plains-Fanwood (NJ)	Brian Hunter	Fort Vancouver (WA)	
1989	Outfield	Jeff Jackson^{G}	Simeon (IL)	Aaron Goins	Owasso (OK)	John Gumpf	Riverside Poly (CA)	
1989	Pitcher	Kiki Jones	Hillsborough (FL)	Scott Burrell°	Hamden (CT)	Thomas Taylor	Louisa County (VA)	
1989	Pitcher	Jeff Juden (2)	Salem (MA)	Chris Roberts	Middleburg (FL)	Jason Zimbauer	Andrew (IL)	
1989	Pitcher	Roger Salkeld	Saugus (CA)	Todd Johnson	Bullard (CA)	Tavo Alvarez	Tucson (AZ)	

=== 1990–1999 ===
Year	Position	First team		Second team		Third team		Ref
Year	Position	Player	High school (state)	Player	High school (state)	Player	High school (state)	Ref
1990	Catcher	Mike Lieberthal*	Westlake (CA)	Kevin Aubin	Drury (MN)	Willie Morales	Tucson (AZ)	
1990	First base	Chris Weinke°	Cretin-Derham Hall (MN)	Marc Newfield	Marina (CA)	Tim Green	Marlboro (NJ)	
1990	Second base	Bill Dunn	Mount St. Joseph (MD)	James Bonnici	Adams (MI)	Shannon Jones	Aurora Central (CO)	
1990	Third base	Jason Varitek*	Lake Brantley (FL)	Bob Osborne	Ben Davis (IN)	Tom Caldara	Ardsley (NY)	
1990	Shortstop	Chipper Jones^{‡}^^{#}	Bolles (FL)	Tom Nevers	Edina (MN)	Shane Andrews	Carlsbad (NM)	
1990	Utility	Jeff Motuzas	Nashua (NH)	Mike Vogel	Cretin-Derham Hall (MN)	Creighton Gubanich	Phoenixville (PA)	
1990	Designated hitter	Mike Patrizi	Pennsauken (NJ)	John Lewallen	Wichita East (KS)	Trent Smith	South Newton (IN)	
1990	Outfield	Tony Clark*	Christian (CA)	Carl Everett*	Hillsborough (FL)	Greg Thomas	Lake Brantley (FL)	
1990	Outfield	Jamie Ogden	White Bear Lake (MN)	Vee Hightower	Mt. Lebanon (PA)	Duane Singleton	McKee Voc-Tech (NY)	
1990	Outfield	Michael Murphy	St. Pius X (NM)	Gary Hurst	Petal (MS)	Steve Money	Midland (MI)	
1990	Pitcher	Todd Van Poppel^{G}	Martin (TX)	Mike Schiefelbein	Chatfield (CO)	Steve Karsay	Christ the King (NY)	
1990	Pitcher	Todd Ritchie	Duncanville (TX)	Ron Walden	Blanchard (OK)	Octavio Alvarez (2)	Tucson (AZ)	
1990	Pitcher	Aaron Knieper	Nouvel Catholic (MI)	Shawn Senior	Cherry Hill West (NJ)	Jose Prado	Coral Gables (FL)	
1991	Catcher	Ryan Luzinski	Holy Cross (NJ)	Shawn Curran	Corona (CA)	Eddie Williams	Miami Edison (FL)	
1991	First base	Cliff Floyd*	Thornwood (IL)	Mark O'Brien	Deering (ME)	Jeff Kiraly	La Cueva (NM)	
1991	Second base	Tripp MacKay	Mount Pleasant (TX)	Calvin Reese	Lower Richland (SC)	Ramon Diaz	Elizabeth (NJ)	
1991	Second base	Tripp MacKay	Mount Pleasant (TX)	Matt Mantei	Three Oaks (MI)	Ramon Diaz	Elizabeth (NJ)	
1991	Third base	Dmitri Young*	Rio Mesa (CA)	Eduardo Ramos	American (FL)	Davis Courter	Corona del Sol (AZ)	
1991	Shortstop	Dante Powell	Millikan (CA)	J.J. Johnson	Pine Plains (NY)	Alex Gonzalez	Miami Killian (FL)	
1991	Utility	Ron Hollis	Brighton (MI)	Benji Gil	Castle Park (CA)	Desi Relaford	Sandalwood (FL)	
1991	Designated hitter	Brandt Mathers	Sarasota (FL)	Nick Williams	Hastings (MI)	Erik Lane	Russelville (AR)	
1991	Designated hitter	Brandt Mathers	Sarasota (FL)	Maceo Houston	Galileo (CA)	Erik Lane	Russelville (AR)	
1991	Outfield	Al Shirley	Danville (VA)	Bruce Thompson	Brandon (FL)	John Curl	Logansport (IN)	
1991	Outfield	Shawn Green*	Tustin (CA)	Paul Ottavinia	Mount Olive (NJ)	McArthur McNabb	Ft. Walton Beach (FL)	
1991	Outfield	Basil Shabazz	Pine Bluff (AR)	Todd Hollandsworth	Newport (WA)	Vincent Moore	Elsik (TX)	
1991	Pitcher	Brien Taylor^{#}	East Cateret (NC)	Justin Thompson*	Klein Oak (TX)	Trever Miller	Trinity (KY)	
1991	Pitcher	Shawn Estes*	Douglas (NV)	Ryan Kjos	Hopkins (MN)	Rich Gorecki	Oak Forest (IL)	
1991	Pitcher	Tyrone Hill	Yucaipa (CA)	Brian Barber^{G}	Dr. Phillips (FL)	Kyle Kennedy	Quitman (MS)	
1992	Catcher	Jason Kendall*	Torrance (CA)	Andrew Jay Hinch^{G}	Midwest City (OK)	Ryan Luzinski (2)	Holy Cross (NJ)	
1992	First base	Brandon Pico	Rogers (RI)	Steve Cox	Monache (CA)	Danny Kanell°	Westminster (FL)	
1992	First base	Brandon Pico	Rogers (RI)	Steve Cox	Monache (CA)	Craig McClure	Columbine (CO)	
1992	Second base	Tripp MacKay (2)	Mount Pleasant (TX)	Bobby Lee Coy	Mullen Prep (CO)	Jim Keefe	Spaulding (NH)	
1992	Third base	Chad Roper	Belton-Honea Path (SC)	Kris Bamberger	Gilbert (AZ)	Mark Pooschke	Madison (OR)	
1992	Shortstop	Derek Jeter^{‡}	Kalamazoo Central (MI)	Preston Wilson*^{BA}	Bamberg Ehrhardt (SC)	Yuri Sanchez	Lynn Tech (MA)	
1992	Utility	Greg Dean	Ada (OK)	Fred Koehne	Wheat Ridge (CO)	John Geis	Paul Moore (NY)	
1992	Designated hitter	T.R. Marcinczyk	St. Thomas Aquinas (CT)	Tom Knauss	Hersey (IL)	Ryan Minor°	Hammon (OK)	
1992	Outfield	VaShon Walker	Harrison County (KY)	Shannon Stewart	Miami Southridge (FL)	Shea Morenz	San Angelo Central (TX)	
1992	Outfield	Johnny Damon*	Dr. Phillips (FL)	Don Furtado	Carson (NV)	Clifford Trey Beamon	W.T. White (TX)	
1992	Outfield	Ryan Topham	Portage Central (MI)	Dwight Maness	William Penn (DE)	John David Hayman	Jackson (MS)	
1992	Pitcher	Jamie Arnold	Osceola (FL)	Peter N. Durkovic	Trinity-Pawling (NY)	Rich Ireland	Crater (OR)	
1992	Pitcher	Dan Serafini	Serra (CA)	Ben White	Salpointe (AZ)	David Spykstra	Cherry Creek (CO)	
1992	Pitcher	James Pittsley	DuBois (PA)	Keith Horn	Pine Bluff (AR)	Sean Runyan	Urbandale (IA)	
1993	No team selected							
1994	Catcher	Paul Konerko*	Chaparral (AZ)	Corey Pointer	Waxahachie (TX)	Eric Schreimann	Jefferson City (MO)	
1994	Catcher	Mark Johnson	Warner Robins (GA)	Matt Treanor	Mater Dei (CA)	Damian Sapp	Pleasant Grove (UT)	
1994	Infield	Matt Smith	Grants Pass (OR)	Eddie Furniss	Nacogdoches (TX)	Andy Thompson	Sun Prairie (WI)	
1994	Infield	Josh Booty°	Evangel Christian (LA)	Jason Camilli	Thunderbird (AZ)	Mike Peeples	Clay (FL)	
1994	Infield	Terrence Long*	Stanhope Elmore (AL)	Troy Glaus*	Carlsbad (CA)	Ryan Freel	Englewood (FL)	
1994	Infield	Kevin Witt	Bishop Kenny (FL)	Bryon Gainey	Davidson (AL)	Sean McGrath	Drury (MA)	
1994	Outfield	McKay Christensen	Clovis West (CA)	Mike Darr	Corona (CA)	Scott Podsednik*	West (TX)	
1994	Outfield	Ben Grieve*	Martin (TX)	Tony Terry	Abbeville (SC)	Gordon Amerson	San Gorgonio (CA)	
1994	Outfield	Norm Hutchins	Lincoln (NY)	Mark Farris	Angleton (TX)	Mike Burrows	American Fork (UT)	
1994	Outfield	Norm Hutchins	Lincoln (NY)	Mark Farris	Angleton (TX)	Chris Sieger	Hackley (NY)	
1994	Pitcher	Jayson Peterson	East (CO)	Brian Rose	Dartmouth (MA)	Corey Avrard	Archbishop Rummel (LA)	
1994	Pitcher	Doug Million^{GB}	Sarasota (FL)	Scott Elarton	Lamar (CO)	Roger Worley	Quartz Hill (CA)	
1994	Pitcher	Jacob Shumate	Hartsville (SC)	Larry Barnes	Englewood (FL)	Jaret Wright	Katella (CA)	
1994	Pitcher	Sean Johnston	Highland Park (IL)	Carl Pavano*	Southington (CT)	Jaret Wright	Katella (CA)	
1995	Catcher	Ben Davis^{B}	Malvern (PA)	Charles Alley	Palm Beach Lakes (FL)	Ben Petrick	Glencoe (OR)	
1995	Catcher	Ben Davis^{B}	Malvern (PA)	Josh Holliday	Stillwater (OK)	Craig Wilson	Marina (CA)	
1995	Infield	Michael Barrett	Pace (GA)	Jim Scharrer	Cathedral Prep (PA)	Joe Lawrence	Barbe (LA)	
1995	Infield	Ryan Jaroncyk	Orange Glen (CA)	Jay Hood	Germantown (TN)	Rob Quinlan	Hill-Murray (MN)	
1995	Infield	Chris Haas	St. Mary (KY)	Jason Woolf	American (FL)	Ken Miller	Providence Catholic (IL)	
1995	Infield	Chad Hermansen	Green Valley (NV)	Doug Blosser	Sarasota (FL)	Jeff Maloney	Ridge (NJ)	
1995	Outfield	Nate Rolison	Petal (MS)	Kevin McGlinchy	Malden (MA)	Derek Wallace	Neville (LA)	
1995	Outfield	Jaime Jones	Rancho Bernardo (CA)	Ken James	Sebring (FL)	Jody Gerut	Willowbrook (IL)	
1995	Outfield	Corey Jenkins°	Dreher (SC)	Darrell Dent	Montclair (CA)	Brad Weber	DeKalb (IN)	
1995	Outfield	Reggie Taylor	Newberry (SC)	Darrell Dent	Montclair (CA)	Brad Weber	DeKalb (IN)	
1995	Pitcher	Roy Halladay^{‡}^	Arvada West (CO)	Rob Bell	Marlboro (NY)	Phil Lowery	Casa Grande (CA)	
1995	Pitcher	Andy Yount	Kingwood (TX)	Dave Coggin	Upland (CA)	Ryan Mills	Horizon (AZ)	
1995	Pitcher	Kerry Wood*	Grand Prairie (TX)	Joe Fontenot	Acadiana (LA)	Jeff Yoder	Pottsville Area (PA)	
1995	Pitcher	Chad Hutchinson^{G}°	Torrey Pines (CA)	Tony McKnight	Arkansas (AR)	Mike Spnielli	Revere (MA)	
1996	Catcher	Eric Munson	Mt. Carmel (CA)	Josh Glassey	Mission Bay (CA)	Josh McAffee	Farmington (NM)	
1996	Infield	Joe Lawrence (2)	Barbe (LA)	Jimmy Rollins^	Encinal (CA)	Nick Johnson	McClatchy (CA)	
1996	Infield	Brent Abernathy	Lovett (GA)	Damian Rolls	Schlagel (KS)	Grant Sharpe	Watkins (MS)	
1996	Infield	A.J. Zapp	Center Grove (IN)	Jim Terrell	Tri-City (MO)	Jason Moore	Westminster (FL)	
1996	Infield	Matt Halloran	Chancellor (VA)	Eric Chavez	Mt. Carmel (CA)	Mike Caruso	Stoneman Douglas (FL)	
1996	Infield	Brandon Byrd	Trinity Presbyterian (AL)	Eric Chavez	Mt. Carmel (CA)	Mike Caruso	Stoneman Douglas (FL)	
1996	Outfield	Robert Stratton	San Marcos (CA)	Milton Bradley*	Long Beach Poly (CA)	Darnell McDonald^{GB}	Cherry Creek (CO)	
1996	Outfield	John Oliver	Lake-Lehman (PA)	Vernon Maxwell	Midwest City (OK)	Neal McCarthy	Bishop Hendricken (RI)	
1996	Outfield	Dermal Brown	Marlboro (NY)	Quincy Carter°	Southwest DeKalb (GA)	Cory Thurman	Texas (TX)	
1996	Outfield	Dermal Brown	Marlboro (NY)	Paul Wilder	Cary (NC)	Cory Thurman	Texas (TX)	
1996	Pitcher	Bobby Seay	Sarasota (FL)	Sam Marsonek	Jesuit (FL)	Todd Noel	North Vermillion (LA)	
1996	Pitcher	Matt White^{GB}	Waynesboro (PA)	Jason Marquis*	Tottenville (NY)	Josh Garrett	South Spencer (IN)	
1996	Pitcher	Adam Eaton	Snohomish (WA)	Gil Meche*	Acadiana (LA)	Jake Westbrook*	Madison County (GA)	
1996	Pitcher	John Patterson	West Orange-Stark (TX)	Nick Bierbrodt	Millikan (CA)	K.O. Wiegandt	Westminster Christian (FL)	
1997	Catcher	Jayson Werth*	Glenwood (IL)	Dane Sardinha	Kamehameha (HI)	Will McCrotty	Russellville (AR)	
1997	Infield	J.J. Davis	Baldwin Park (CA)	Michael Restovich	Mayo (MN)	Chase Utley*	Long Beach Poly (CA)	
1997	Infield	Troy Cameron	St. Thomas Aquinas (FL)	Aaron Capista	Joliet Catholic (IL)	Ricky Bell	Moeller (OH)	
1997	Infield	Scott Hodges	Henry Clay (KY)	Jason Romano	Hillsborough (FL)	Keoni DeRenne	Iolani (HI)	
1997	Infield	Mike Cuddyer*	Great Bridge (VA)	Tom Pittman	East St. John (LA)	Chris Aguila	McQueen (NV)	
1997	Infield	Jack Cust	Immaculata (NJ)	Tom Pittman	East St. John (LA)	Chris Aguila	McQueen (NV)	
1997	Outfield	Darnell McDonald^{GB} (2)	Cherry Creek (CO)	Tootie Myers	Petal (MS)	Kenny Kelly	Tampa Catholic (FL)	
1997	Outfield	Tyrell Goodwin	East Bladen (NC)	Jose Nicolas	Westminster Christian (FL)	Alvin Morrow	Kirkwood (MO)	
1997	Outfield	Vernon Wells*	Bowie (TX)	Nathan Haynes	Pinole Valley (CA)	Joey Nation	Putnam City (OK)	
1997	Outfield	Vernon Wells*	Bowie (TX)	Brett Caradonna	El Capitan (CA)	Joey Nation	Putnam City (OK)	
1997	Pitcher	Geoff Goetz	Jesuit (FL)	Mark Mangum	Kingwood (TX)	Shane Loux	Highland (AZ)	
1997	Pitcher	Jon Garland*	Kennedy (CA)	Tim Drew	Lowndes County (GA)	Jason Standridge	Hewitt-Trussville (AL)	
1997	Pitcher	John Curtice	Great Bridge (VA)	Donnie Bridges	Oak Grove (MS)	Sean Douglass	Antelope Valley (CA)	
1997	Pitcher	Rick Ankiel	Port St. Lucie (FL)	Chris Stowe	Chancellor (VA)	Shane Arthurs	Westmoore (OK)	
1997	Pitcher	Rick Ankiel	Port St. Lucie (FL)	Chris Stowe	Chancellor (VA)	T.J. Tucker	River Ridge (FL)	
1998	Catcher	Jeffrey Winchester	Archbishop Rummel (LA)	Todd Pratt	Tooele (UT)	Beau Craig	Grossmont (CA)	
1998	First base	Austin Kearns	Lafayette (KY)	Josh Pressley	Westminster (FL)	Ben Diggins	Bradshaw (AZ)	
1998	Infield	Felipe Lopez*	Lake Brantley (FL)	Anthony Torcato	Woodland (CA)	Gregory Porter	Keller (TX)	
1998	Infield	Sean Burroughs	Wilson (CA)	Drew Henson^{GB}°	Brighton (MI)	Kevin Bass	Fayette County (AL)	
1998	Infield	Josh McKinley	Malvern (PA)	David Kelton	Troup County (GA)	Kevin Kelly	Gloucester Catholic (NJ)	
1998	Utility	Gerald Laird	La Quinta (CA)	Alex Hart	Chambersburg (PA)	Christopher Jones	South Mecklenburg (NC)	
1998	Designated hitter	Mark Teixeira*	Mount St. Joseph (MD)	Ryan Langerhans	Round Rock (TX)	Andrew Good	Rochester (MI)	
1998	Outfield	Corey Patterson	Harrison (GA)	Raphael Freeman	Dallas Christian (TX)	Ben Cordova	Marian Catholic (CA)	
1998	Outfield	Andrew Brown	Richmond (IN)	Chip Ambres	West Brook (TX)	Jorge Padilla	Florida Air (FL)	
1998	Outfield	Rick Elder	Sprayberry (GA)	Arturo McDowell	Forest Hill (MS)	Mamon Tucker	S. F. Austin (TX)	
1998	Pitcher	J.M. Gold	Toms River North (NJ)	Patrick Strange	Springfield (MA)	Matt Belisle	McCallum (TX)	
1998	Pitcher	C.C. Sabathia^	Vallejo (CA)	Christopher George	Klein (TX)	Jermaine Van Buren	Hattiesburg (MS)	
1998	Pitcher	Matt Roney	Edmond North (OK)	Nate Cornejo	Wellington (KS)	Mark Prior*	University (CA)	
1999	Catcher	Ryan Christianson	Arlington (CA)	Nick Trzesniak	Andrew (IL)	Jay Perez	Seymour (CT)	
1999	First base	Chris Duncan	Canyon del Oro (AZ)	Brian West	West Monroe (LA)	Brian Cardwell	Sapulpa (OK)	
1999	Infield	Corey Myers	Desert Vista (AZ)	Brandon Phillips*	Redan (GA)	Brandon Love	Viola (AR)	
1999	Infield	Josh Wilson	Mt. Lebanon (PA)	Brennan King	Oakland (TN)	Sheldon Fuse	George Jenkins (FL)	
1999	Infield	Drew Meyer	Bishop England (SC)	Pat Manning	Mater Dei (CA)	Pat Osborn	Bakersfield (CA)	
1999	Utility	B. J. Garbe^{G}	Moses Lake (WA)	Jarrod Schmidt	Lassiter (GA)	Cody Ross	Carlsbad (NM)	
1999	Designated hitter	Neil Jenkins	William Dwyer (FL)	Brad Baker	Pioneer Valley Regional (MA)	Rob Bowen	Homestead (IN)	
1999	Outfield	Josh Hamilton^^{#B}	Athens Drive (NC)	Alberto Concepcion	El Segundo (CA)	Mike Mallory	Dinwiddie (VA)	
1999	Outfield	Rick Asadoorian	Northbridge (MA)	Carl Crawford*	Jefferson Davis (TX)	Aron Weston	Solon (OH)	
1999	Outfield	Vince Faison	Toombs County (GA)	Jason Repko	Hanford (WA)	Jason Cooper	Moses Lake (WA)	
1999	Pitcher	Josh Beckett*	Spring (TX)	Richard Stahl	Newton (GA)	Ryan Gloger	Jesuit (FL)	
1999	Pitcher	Josh Girdley	Jasper (TX)	Ty Howington	Hudson's Bay (WA)	Josh Cenate	Jefferson (WV)	
1999	Pitcher	Bobby Bradley	Wellington (FL)	Jason Stumm	Centralia (WA)	Gerik Baxter	Edmonds Woodway (WA)	

=== 2000–2009 ===
Year	Position	First team		Second team		Third team		Ref
Year	Position	Player	High school (state)	Player	High school (state)	Player	High school (state)	Ref
2000	Catcher	Scott Heard	Rancho Bernardo (CA)	No team selected		No team selected		
2000	First base	Adrian Gonzalez*^{#}	Eastlake (CA)	No team selected		No team selected		
2000	Infield	Luis Montanez	Coral Park (FL)	No team selected		No team selected		
2000	Infield	Corey Smith	Piscataway (NJ)	No team selected		No team selected		
2000	Infield	David Espinosa	Gulliver (FL)	No team selected		No team selected		
2000	Utility	Mike Stodolka	Centennial (CA)	No team selected		No team selected		
2000	Outfield	Shaun Boyd	Vista (CA)	No team selected		No team selected		
2000	Outfield	Rocco Baldelli	Bishop Hendricken (RI)	No team selected		No team selected		
2000	Outfield	Dave Krynzel	Green Valley (NV)	No team selected		No team selected		
2000	Pitcher	Joseph Durbin	Coronado (AZ)	No team selected		No team selected		
2000	Pitcher	Matt Wheatland	Rancho Bernardo (CA)	No team selected		No team selected		
2000	Pitcher	Mark Phillips	Hanover (PA)	No team selected		No team selected		
2000	Pitcher	Matt Harrington^{B}	Palmdale (CA)	No team selected		No team selected		
2001	Catcher	Joe Mauer^{‡^#B}	Cretin-Derham Hall (MN)	Jeff Mathis	Marianna (FL)	Jon Zeringue	E. D. White (LA)	
2001	First base	Casey Kotchman^{G}	Seminole (FL)	Brad Nelson	Bishop Garrigan (IA)	Chamar McDonald	Madison Central (MS)	
2001	Infield	Dave Wright*	Hickory (VA)	B.J. Upton	Greenbrier Christian (VA)	Matt Ferrara	Westminster (FL)	
2001	Infield	Josh Burrus	Wheeler (GA)	Mike Garciaparra	Don Bosco (CA)	Joe Mather	Mountain Point (AZ)	
2001	Infield	Josh Burrus	Wheeler (GA)	Jayson Nix	Midland (TX)	Corey Ragsdale	Nettleton (AR)	
2001	Utility	John Killalea	Seminole (FL)	J.J. Hardy*	Sabino (AZ)	Jeff Hourigan	Masuk (CT)	
2001	Outfield	Mike Conroy	Boston College (MA)	Alhaji Turay	Auburn (WA)	Jay Mattox	Conway (AR)	
2001	Outfield	Roscoe Crosby°	Union (SC)	Alan Moye	Pine Tree (TX)	Bill Paganetti	Galena (NV)	
2001	Outfield	Mike Wilson	Washington (OK)	Chris Resop	Barron Collier (FL)	Jeff Francoeur	Parkview (GA)	
2001	Pitcher	Mike Jones	Thunderbird (AZ)	Andy Sisco	Eastlake (WA)	Dan Denham	Deer Valley (CA)	
2001	Pitcher	Gavin Floyd	Mount St. Joseph (MD)	Macay McBride	Screven County (GA)	J. P. Howell	Jesuit (CA)	
2001	Pitcher	Colt Griffin	Marshall (TX)	Alan Horne	Marianna (FL)	Garrett Berger	Carmel (IN)	
2001	Pitcher	Jeremy Sowers	Ballard (KY)	Jeremy Bonderman	Pasco (WA)	Scott Tyler	Downington (PA)	
2002	Catcher	Adam Donachie	Timber Creek (FL)	Justin Sullivan	Yukon (OK)	Mike Nixon	Sunnyslope (AZ)	
2002	First base	Prince Fielder*	Eau Gallie (FL)	James Loney	Elkins (TX)	John Fitzpatrick	Iona Prep (NY)	
2002	Infield	Scott Moore	Cypress (CA)	Sergio Santos	Mater Dei (CA)	Brett McMillan	Ponderosa (CA)	
2002	Infield	Micah Schilling	Silliman (LA)	Matt Whitney	Palm Beach Gardens (FL)	Brandon Weeden°	Edmond Santa Fe (OK)	
2002	Infield	B.J. Upton (2)	Greenbrier Christian (VA)	Josh Murray	Jesuit (FL)	Robert Andino	Miami Southridge (FL)	
2002	Designated hitter	Corey Shafer	Choctaw (OK)	Micah Owings	Gainesville (GA)	Dan Haigwood	Midland (AR)	
2002	Outfield	Jeff Francoeur (2)	Parkview (GA)	Mike Megrew	Chariho (RI)	Joe Hunter	Germantown (TN)	
2002	Outfield	Jason Pridie	Prescott (AZ)	Keiunta Span	Tampa Catholic (FL)	Jarrad Page°	San Leandro (CA)	
2002	Outfield	Jeremy Hermida	Wheeler (GA)	Brent Clevlen	Westwood (TX)	John Mayberry	Rockhurst (MO)	
2002	Pitcher	Clint Everts	Cypress Falls (TX)	Zack Greinke^^{GB}	Apopka (FL)	Greg Miller	Esparanza (CA)	
2002	Pitcher	Chris Gruler	Liberty (CA)	Zach Segovia	Forney (TX)	Blair Johnson	Washburn (KS)	
2002	Pitcher	Jason Neighborgall	Riverside (NC)	Matt Cain*	Houston (TN)	Zach Hammes	Iowa City (IA)	
2002	Pitcher	Scott Kazmir*	Cypress Falls (TX)	Cole Hamels*	Rancho Bernardo (CA)	Jon Lester*	Bellarmine Prep (WA)	
2003	Catcher	Daric Barton	Marina (CA)	Jarrod Saltalamacchia	Royal Palm Beach (FL)	C.J. Bressoud	North Cobb (GA)	
2003	Infield	Matt Moses	Mills Goodwin (VA)	Josh Darby	Marist (GA)	Charles Tiffany	Charter Oak (CA)	
2003	Infield	Eric Duncan	Seton Hall Prep (NJ)	Jonathan Fulton	George Washington (VA)	Alex Vitale	Severna Park (MD)	
2003	Infield	Ian Stewart	La Quinta (CA)	Sean Rodriguez	Braddock (FL)	Jeffrey Flaig	El Dorado (CA)	
2003	Infield	Brandon Wood	Horizon (AZ)	Adam Jones*	Morse (CA)	Robert Valido	Coral Park (FL)	
2003	Utility	James Houser	Sarasota (FL)	Kyle Waldrop	Farragut (TN)	Chad Barben	Taylorsville (UT)	
2003	Designated hitter	Ryan Harvey	Dunedin (FL)	Drew Stubbs	Atlanta (TX)	Tanner Rogers	Columbine (CO)	
2003	Outfield	Delmon Young^{#}	Camarillo (CA)	Ryan Sweeney	Xavier (IA)	Xavier Paul	Slidell (LA)	
2003	Outfield	Chris Lubanski^{G}	Kennedy-Kenrick (PA)	Estee Harris	Central Islip (NY)	Matt Kemp*	Midwest City (OK)	
2003	Outfield	Lastings Milledge	Lakewood Ranch (FL)	Michael Hall	Walton (GA)	Jordan Parraz	Green Valley (NV)	
2003	Pitcher	John Danks	Round Rock (TX)	Chad Billingsley*	Defiance (OH)	Jay Sborz	Langley (VA)	
2003	Pitcher	Jeff Allison^{B}	Veterans Memorial (MA)	Adam Miller	McKinney (TX)	Anthony Whittington	Buffalo (WV)	
2003	Pitcher	Craig Whitaker	Lufkin (TX)	Andrew Miller*	Buchholz (FL)	Joe Reyes	Riverside Poly (CA)	
2004	Catcher	Neil Walker	Pine-Richland (PA)	Angel Salome	George Washington (NY)	Alex Garabedian	Columbus (FL)	
2004	Infield	Matt Bush^{#}	Mission Bay (CA)	Eric Campbell	Gibson Southern (IN)	Matt Tuiasosopo	Woodinville (WA)	
2004	Infield	Chris Nelson	Redan (GA)	Justin Upton*^{#GB}	Great Bridge (VA)	Ric Bishop	Columbus (GA)	
2004	Infield	Bill Butler*	Wolfson (FL)	Steve Marquardt	Kennewick (WA)	Ed Prasch	Milton (GA)	
2004	Infield	Blake DeWitt	Sikeston (MO)	Josh Horton	Orange (NC)	Yovani Gallardo*	Trimble (TX)	
2004	Utility	Trevor Plouffe	Crespi (CA)	Jay Rainville	Bishop Hendricken (RI)	James Parr	La Cueva (NM)	
2004	Designated hitter	Charles Creswell	Perryton (TX)	Jon Poterson	Chandler (AZ)	Billy Killian	Chippewa Hills (MI)	
2004	Outfield	Greg Golson	Connally (TX)	Dexter Fowler*	Milton (GA)	Patrick White°	Daphne (AL)	
2004	Outfield	Kyle Waldrop (2)	Farragut (TN)	Warren McFadden	Nova (FL)	Reid Brignac	St. Amant (LA)	
2004	Outfield	K. C. Herren	Auburn (WA)	Greg Burns	Walnut (CA)	Chuck Lofgren	Serra (CA)	
2004	Pitcher	Mark Rogers^{G}	Mt. Ararat (ME)	Scott Elbert	Seneca (MO)	Troy Patton	Tomball (TX)	
2004	Pitcher	Homer Bailey^{B}	La Grange (TX)	Phil Hughes*	Foothill (CA)	Erik Cordier	Southern Door (WI)	
2004	Pitcher	Eric Hurley	Wolfson (FL)	Nick Adenhart	Williamsport (MD)	Anthony Swarzak	Nova (FL)	
2005	Catcher	Brandon Snyder	Westfield (VA)	Preston Paramore	Allen (TX)	Jonathan Egan	Cross Creek (GA)	
2005	Infield	Justin Upton*^{#GB} (2)	Great Bridge (VA)	Paul Kelly	Flower Mound (TX)	Justin Bristow	Mills Goodwin (VA)	
2005	Infield	C. J. Henry	Putnam City (OK)	Ryan Mount	Ayala (CA)	Reese Havens	Bishop England (SC)	
2005	Infield	Henry Sanchez	Mission Bay (CA)	John Whittleman	Kingwood (TX)	Justin Smoak*	Stratford (SC)	
2005	Infield	Jeff Bianchi	Lampeter-Strasburg (PA)	Drew Thompson	Jupiter (FL)	Justin Smoak*	Stratford (SC)	
2005	Utility	Chaz Roe	Lafayette (KY)	Iain Sebastian	Columbus (FL)	Trevor Bell	Crescenta Valley (CA)	
2005	Utility	Chaz Roe	Lafayette (KY)	Iain Sebastian	Columbus (FL)	Buster Posey^	Lee County (GA)	
2005	Designated hitter	Colby Rasmus	Russell County (AL)	Isaac Davis	Chaparral (AZ)	Zach Putnam	Pioneer (MI)	
2005	Outfield	Cameron Maybin	T. C. Roberson (NC)	John Drennen	Rancho Bernardo (CA)	Carlos Del Rosorio	George Washington (NY)	
2005	Outfield	Andrew McCutchen^	Fort Meade (FL)	Reid Engel	Lewis-Palmer (CO)	Jordan Schafer	Winter Haven (FL)	
2005	Outfield	Jay Bruce*	Westbrook (TX)	Scott Van Slyke	Burroughs (MO)	Daryl Jones	Spring (TX)	
2005	Pitcher	Chris Volstad	Palm Beach Gardens (FL)	Ryan Tucker	Temple City (TX)	Beau Jones	Destrehan (LA)	
2005	Pitcher	Mark Pawelek	Springville (UT)	Tyler Herron	Wellington (FL)	Bryan Morris	Tullahoma (TN)	
2005	Pitcher	Aaron Thompson	Second Baptist (TX)	Michael Bowden	Waubonsie (IL)	Sean West	Captain Shreve (LA)	
2006	Catcher	Max Sapp	Bishop Moore (FL)	Hank Conger	Huntington Beach (CA)	Ryan Smith	Westlake (CA)	
2006	First base	Matt Sweeney	Magruder (MD)	Aaron Senne	Mayo (MN)	Brett Davis	Clackamas (OR)	
2006	Infield	Bill Rowell	Bishop Eustace (NJ)	Tyler Henson	Tuttle (OK)	Brett Sowers	Cherry Creek (CO)	
2006	Infield	Adrian Cardenas^{B}	Monsignor Pace (FL)	Thomas Pham	Durango (NV)	Brent Brewer	Sandy Creek (GA)	
2006	Infield	Chris Marrero	Monsignor Pace (FL)	Marcus Lemon	Eustis (FL)	Zack Murry	Chanute (KS)	
2006	Utility	Daniel Stegall	Greenwood (AR)	Joey Mahalic	Wilson (OR)	Matt Packer	Christian Brothers (TN)	
2006	Utility	Daniel Stegall	Greenwood (AR)	Joey Mahalic	Wilson (OR)	Tyler Hibbs	Arundel (MD)	
2006	Designated hitter	Matt Sulentic	Hillcrest (TX)	Jake Locker°	Ferndale (WA)	Tyler Townsend	Cape Henlopen (DE)	
2006	Designated hitter	Matt Sulentic	Hillcrest (TX)	Jake Locker°	Ferndale (WA)	Will Musson	Wethersfield (CT)	
2006	Outfield	Travis Snider	Jackson (WA)	Cedric Hunter	King (GA)	Jason Place	Wren (SC)	
2006	Outfield	Kyler Burke	Ooltewah (TN)	Russell Moldenhauer	Boerne (TX)	Chris Parmelee	Chino Hills (CA)	
2006	Outfield	Cody Johnson	Mosley (FL)	Justin Reed	Hillcrest Christian (MS)	Mikal Garbarino	San Dimas (CA)	
2006	Outfield	Cody Johnson	Mosley (FL)	Justin Reed	Hillcrest Christian (MS)	Ronnie Welty	Mesquite (AZ)	
2006	Pitcher	Clayton Kershaw^^{G}	Highland Park (TX)	Jeff Locke*	Kennett (NH)	Glen Witkowski	Flanagan (FL)	
2006	Pitcher	Kyle Drabek	The Woodlands (TX)	Alex White	Conley (NC)	Greg Peavey	Hudson's Bay (WA)	
2006	Pitcher	Brett Anderson	Stillwater (OK)	Bradley Boxberger*	Foothill (CA)	Cameron Nobles	Jackson (WA)	
2006	Pitcher	Brett Anderson	Stillwater (OK)	Bradley Boxberger*	Foothill (CA)	Anthony Butler	Oak Creek (WI)	
2007	Catcher	Devin Mesoraco*	Punxsutawney (PA)	Yasmani Grandal*	Miami Springs (FL)	Rafael Neda	Amphitheater (AZ)	
2007	Catcher	Devin Mesoraco*	Punxsutawney (PA)	Yasmani Grandal*	Miami Springs (FL)	Travis D'Arnaud	Lakewood (CA)	
2007	First base	Josh Garcia	Brophy Prep (AZ)	Iden Nazario	Miami Southridge (FL)	Freddie Freeman^	El Modena (CA)	
2007	Second base	No player selected		Andy Burns	Rocky Mountain (CO)	Tyler Hibbs (2)	Arundel (MD)	
2007	Third base	No player selected		Kevin Ahrens	Memorial (TX)	Riccio Torrez	Brophy Prep (AZ)	
2007	Shortstop	No player selected		No player selected		Justin Jackson	T. C. Roberson (NC)	
2007	Infield	Josh Vitters	Cypress (CA)	Jon Gilmore	Iowa City (IA)	John Tolisano	Estero (FL)	
2007	Infield	Mike Moustakas*^{B}	Chatsworth (CA)	Matt Dominguez	Chatsworth (CA)	John Tolisano	Estero (FL)	
2007	Infield	Peter Kozma	Owasso (OK)	Matt Dominguez	Chatsworth (CA)	John Tolisano	Estero (FL)	
2007	Designated hitter	Nick Noonan	Parker (CA)	Brett Oberholtzer	William Penn (DE)	Blake Forsythe	Christian Brothers (TN)	
2007	Outfield	Jason Heyward*	Henry County (GA)	Steve Blum	West Salem (OR)	Bobby Coyle	Chatsworth (CA)	
2007	Outfield	Ben Revere	Lexington Catholic (KY)	L.J. Hoes	St. John's (DC)	Mike Stanton^	Notre Dame (CA)	
2007	Outfield	Wendell Fairley	George County (MS)	Matt Newman	Brophy Prep (AZ)	Kentrail Davis	Theodore (AL)	
2007	Pitcher	Rick Porcello^^{G}	Seton Hall Prep (NJ)	Michael Main	DeLand (FL)	Jack McGeary	Roxbury Latin (MA)	
2007	Pitcher	Jarrod Parker	Norwell (IN)	Josh Smoker	Calhoun (GA)	Michael Watt	Capistrano Valley (CA)	
2007	Pitcher	Blake Beavan	Irving (TX)	Matt Harvey*	Fitch (CT)	Kyle Blair	Los Gatos (CA)	
2007	Pitcher	Tim Alderson	Horizon (AZ)	Chris Withrow	Midland Christian (TX)	Josh Osich	Bishop Kelly (ID)	
2007	Pitcher	Tim Alderson	Horizon (AZ)	Chris Withrow	Midland Christian (TX)	Madison Bumgarner*	South Caldwell (NC)	
2008	Catcher	Kyle Skipworth^{G}	Patriot (CA)	Jean Carlos Rodriguez	George Washington (NY)	Anthony Angulo	Miami Southridge (FL)	
2008	First base	Eric Hosmer*	American Heritage (FL)	Clark Murphy	Fallbrook Union (FL)	Austin Stadler	James River (VA)	
2008	Infield	Timothy Beckham^{#}	Griffin (GA)	Rolando Gomez	Flanagan (FL)	Matt Jensen	Clovis East (CA)	
2008	Infield	Derrik Gibson	Seaford (DE)	Matt Cerda	Oceanside (CA)	Tyler Hanover	North Davidson (NC)	
2008	Infield	Anthony Hewitt	Salisbury (CT)	Cam Schiller	Prescott (AZ)	Steve Proscia	Don Bosco Prep (NJ)	
2008	Utility	Jaff Decker	Sunrise Mountain (AZ)	Tyler Chatwood	Redlands East Valley (CA)	Ryan Westmoreland	Portsmouth (RI)	
2008	Designated hitter	Christopher Smith	Centennial (CA)	Jay Austin	North Atlanta (GA)	Bo Bigham	Arkansas (AR)	
2008	Designated hitter	Christopher Smith	Centennial (CA)	Jay Austin	North Atlanta (GA)	Joey DeMichele	Arcadia (AZ)	
2008	Outfield	Aaron Hicks	Wilson (CA)	L.J. Hoes (2)	St. John's (DC)	Herbie Romero	Santa Fe (NM)	
2008	Outfield	Zach Collier	Chino Hills (CA)	John Ruettinger	Joliet Catholic (IL)	Mike Planeta	Willow Canyon (AZ)	
2008	Outfield	Xavier Avery	Cedar Grove (GA)	Anthony Gose	Bellflower (CA)	Robert Grossman	Cypress-Fairbanks (TX)	
2008	Outfield	Xavier Avery	Cedar Grove (GA)	Anthony Gose	Bellflower (CA)	Michael Blake	Heritage (WA)	
2008	Pitcher	Ethan Martin^{B}	Stephens County (GA)	Brett DeVall	Niceville (FL)	Mike Montgomery	William S. Hart (CA)	
2008	Pitcher	Gerrit Cole^^{#}	Orange Lutheran (CA)	Tyler Stovall	Hokes Bluff (AL)	B.J. Hermsen	West Delaware (IA)	
2008	Pitcher	Jake Odorizzi*	Highland (IL)	Dan Hultzen	St. Albans (DC)	Danny Coulombe	Chaparral (AZ)	
2009	Catcher	Max Stassi	Yuba City (CA)	Luke Maile	Covington Catholic (KY)	William Myers*	Wesleyan Christian (NC)	
2009	Catcher	Max Stassi	Yuba City (CA)	Luke Maile	Covington Catholic (KY)	Chad Fortenberry	Northshore (LA)	
2009	First base	Jeff Malm	Trinity (KY)	Giancarlo Brugnoni	De La Salle (MI)	Daniel Canela	Florida Christian (FL)	
2009	Infield	Stephen Bruno	Gloucester Catholic (NJ)	John Wooten	Eastern Wayne (NC)	Matt Davidson	Yucaipa (CA)	
2009	Infield	Bobby Borchering	Bishop Verot (FL)	Taylor Lindsey	Desert Mt. (AZ)	Jiovanni Mier	Bonita (CA)	
2009	Infield	Daniel Fields	University of Detroit Jesuit (MI)	Nolan Arenado*	El Toro (CA)	Billy Hamilton	Taylorsville (MS)	
2009	Infield	Daniel Fields	University of Detroit Jesuit (MI)	Nolan Arenado*	El Toro (CA)	Ryan Brett	Highline (WA)	
2009	Utility	Matt Hobgood^{G}	Norco (CA)	Jake Barrett	Desert Ridge (AZ)	Nolan Gaige	Columbia (NY)	
2009	Designated hitter	Kris Hobson	Stockdale (CA)	Mike Schaaf	Arthur Hill (MI)	Jack Carey	St. Paul's (MD)	
2009	Outfield	Michael Trout^	Millville (NJ)	Slade Heathcott	Texas (TX)	Marquise Cooper	Edison (CA)	
2009	Outfield	Donavan Tate	Cartersville (GA)	Max Walla	Albuquerque (NM)	Jacob Marisnick	Riverside Poly (CA)	
2009	Outfield	Randal Grichuk	Lamar (TX)	Jake Stewart	Rocky Mt. (CO)	Everett Williams	McCallum (TX)	
2009	Pitcher	Tyler Matzek	Capistrano Valley (CA)	Shelby Miller*	Brownwood (TX)	Steven Matz	Ward Melville (NY)	
2009	Pitcher	DJ Baxendale	Sylvan Hills (AR)	Jacob Turner	Westminster Christian (MO)	Garrett Gould	Maize (KS)	
2009	Pitcher	Zach Wheeler*	East Paulding (GA)	Patrick Schuster	Mitchell (FL)	Chad James	Yukon (OK)	

=== 2010–2014 ===
Year	Position	First team		Second team		Third team		Ref
Year	Position	Player	High school (state)	Player	High school (state)	Player	High school (state)	Ref
2010	Catcher	Greg Bird	Grandview (CO)	Ethan Bennett	Farragut (TN)	Matt Roberts	Graham (NC)	
2010	Catcher	Greg Bird	Grandview (CO)	Ethan Bennett	Farragut (TN)	Jake Rodriguez	Elk Grove (CA)	
2010	First base	Cole Gleason	Red Mountain (AZ)	Patrick Gallagher	Reno (NV)	Yordi Cabrera	Lakeland (FL)	
2010	Infield	Chris Culver	Irondequoit (NY)	Nicky Delmonico	Farragut (TN)	Sean Coyle	Germantown (TN)	
2010	Infield	Manny Machado*	Brito (FL)	Tyler Coughenor	Wichita Collegiate (KS)	Bobby Juan	LaCrosse (WI)	
2010	Infield	Delino Deshields Jr.	Woodward (GA)	Ryan Brett (2)	Highline (WA)	Angelo Gumbs	Torrance (CA)	
2010	Infield	Delino Deshields Jr.	Woodward (GA)	Ryan Brett (2)	Highline (WA)	Mike Antonio	George Washington (NY)	
2010	Utility	Kaleb Cowart^{GB}	Cook (GA)	James Bradley	Nitro (WV)	Cody Buckel	Royal (CA)	
2010	Designated hitter	Jacob Realmuto*	Carl Albert (OK)	Brett Bass	Millard West (NE)	Kris Bryant^	Bonanza (NV)	
2010	Designated hitter	Jacob Realmuto*	Carl Albert (OK)	Brett Bass	Millard West (NE)	Kevin Cron	Mountain Pointe (AZ)	
2010	Outfield	Josh Sale	Bishop Blanchet (WA)	Michael O'Neil	Olentangy Liberty (OH)	Ty Linton	Charlotte Christian (NC)	
2010	Outfield	Austin Wilson	Harvard-Westlake (CA)	Aaron Shipman	Brooks County (GA)	Cory Hahn	Mater Dei (CA)	
2010	Outfield	Drew Vettleson	Central Kitsap (WA)	Chuckie Jones	Boonville (MO)	Brian Bolden	Madison Central (MS)	
2010	Pitcher	Jameson Taillon	The Woodlands (TX)	Stetson Allie	St. Edward (OH)	Mike Foltynewicz*	Minooka (IL)	
2010	Pitcher	Philip Pfeifer	Farragut (TN)	Zach Lee	McKinney (TX)	Dylan Covey	Maranatha (CA)	
2010	Pitcher	Kyle Crockett	Poquoson (VA)	Logan Ehlers	Nebraska City (NE)	Jesse Biddle	Germantown (PA)	
2010	Pitcher	Kyle Crockett	Poquoson (VA)	Logan Ehlers	Nebraska City (NE)	Adam Duke	Spanish Fork (UT)	
2011	Catcher	Christin Stewart	Providence Christian (GA)	Blake Swihart	Cleveland (NM)	Wayne Taylor	Memorial (TX)	
2011	First base	Daniel Vogelbach*	Bishop Verot (FL)	Trevor Mitsui	Shorewood (WA)	Jacob Anderson	Chino Hills (CA)	
2011	Infield	Jake Hager	Sierra Vista (NV)	Nick Johnson	Blue Ridge (AZ)	Travis Harrison	Tustin (CA)	
2011	Infield	Francisco Lindor*	Montverde (FL)	Alex Bregman*	Albuquerque (NM)	Branden Cogswell	Shenendehowa (NY)	
2011	Infield	Javier Baez*	Arlington Country (FL)	Joe Serrano	Salpointe (AZ)	Sam Travis	Providence Catholic (IL)	
2011	Infield	Javier Baez*	Arlington Country (FL)	Joe Serrano	Salpointe (AZ)	Trevor Story*	Irving (TX)	
2011	Utility	Hudson Boyd	Bishop Verot (FL)	Kevin Cron (2)	Mountain Pointe (AZ)	Zach Fish	Gull Lake (MI)	
2011	Utility	Hudson Boyd	Bishop Verot (FL)	Kevin Cron (2)	Mountain Pointe (AZ)	Jose Trevino	St. John Paul II (TX)	
2011	Designated hitter	Joey Gallo*	Bishop Gorman (NV)	Dante Bichette	Orangewood Christian (FL)	Bryce Greager	Fountain Hills (AZ)	
2011	Designated hitter	Joey Gallo*	Bishop Gorman (NV)	Dante Bichette	Orangewood Christian (FL)	Matt Bosse	Calvert Hall (MD)	
2011	Outfield	Josh Bell*	Jesuit College Prep (TX)	C.J. McElroy	Clear Creek (TX)	Jake Cave	Kecoughtan (VA)	
2011	Outfield	Larry Greene	Berrien County (GA)	Bubba Starling	Gardner Edgerton (KS)	Charlie Tilson	New Trier (IL)	
2011	Outfield	Williams Jerez	Grand Street (NY)	Kayden Porter	Spanish Fork (UT)	Cole Gleason (2)	Red Mountain (AZ)	
2011	Outfield	Williams Jerez	Grand Street (NY)	Kayden Porter	Spanish Fork (UT)	Granden Goetzman	Palmetto (FL)	
2011	Pitcher	José Fernández*	Alonso (FL)	Tyler Beede	Lawrence Academy (MA)	Jordan Cote	Winnisquam (NH)	
2011	Pitcher	Archie Bradley	Broken Arrow (OK)	Henry Owens	Edison (CA)	Sebastian Kessay	Blue Ridge (AZ)	
2011	Pitcher	Dylan Bundy^{GB}	Owasso (OK)	Robert Stephenson	Alhambra (CA)	Blake Snell^	Shorewood (WA)	
2011	Pitcher	Dylan Bundy^{GB}	Owasso (OK)	Robert Stephenson	Alhambra (CA)	Cy Sneed	Twin Falls (ID)	
2012	Catcher	Brent Williams	Liberty (CO)	Stryker Trahan	Acadiana (LA)	Korey Dunbar	Nitro (WV)	
2012	First base	Matt Olson*	Parkview (GA)	Evan Walter	Thomas Jefferson (CO)	Jake Thompson	Rockwall-Heath (TX)	
2012	Infield	Corey Seager*	Northwest Cabarrus (NC)	Gavin Cecchini	Barbe (LA)	Austin Simcox	Farragut (TN)	
2012	Infield	Joey Gallo* (2)	Bishop Gorman (NV)	Austin Andrews	Wilson (OR)	Josh Advocate	River Valley (AZ)	
2012	Infield	Dan Robertson	Upland (CA)	Xavier Turner	Sandusky (OH)	Addison Russell*	Pace (FL)	
2012	Utility	Courtney Hawkins	Carroll (TX)	Adamy Schaly	Ashland (OH)	Nate Griep	Millard West (NE)	
2012	Utility	Courtney Hawkins	Carroll (TX)	Adamy Schaly	Ashland (OH)	Josh Sborz	McLean (VA)	
2012	Designated hitter	Taylor Hawkins	Carl Albert (OK)	Jamie Westbrook	Basha (AZ)	Luke Lowry	Cosby (VA)	
2012	Outfield	Byron Buxton^{B}	Appling County (GA)	Chris Beall	Brophy Prep (AZ)	D'Vone McClure	Jacksonville (AR)	
2012	Outfield	Albert Almora	Mater (FL)	Dylan Cozens	Chaparral (AZ)	B.J. Boyd	Palo Alto (CA)	
2012	Outfield	Tate Matheny	Westminster Christian (MO)	David Dahl*	Oak Mountain (AZ)	Shilo McCall	Piedra Vista (NM)	
2012	Pitcher	Lance McCullers Jr.*^{G}	Jesuit (FL)	Paul Blackburn	Heritage (CA)	Luke Eubank	Newbury Park (CA)	
2012	Pitcher	Collin Wiles	Blue Valley West (KS)	Brady Bramlett	Arlington (CA)	Kyle Funkhouser	Oak Forest (IL)	
2012	Pitcher	Trey Killian	Mountain Home (AR)	Robert Kaminsky	Saint Joseph Regional (NJ)	Kevin Hamann	Summit (OR)	
2013	Catcher	Tanner Murphy	Malden (MO)	Reese McGuire	Kentwood (WA)	Jonah Heim	Amherst Central (NY)	
2013	Catcher	Tanner Murphy	Malden (MO)	Reese McGuire	Kentwood (WA)	Nick Ciuffo	Lexington (SC)	
2013	First base	Dominic Smith	Serra (CA)	Drew Bridges	Carthage (MO)	Carmen Benedetti	Grosse Pointe North (MI)	
2013	Infield	Christian Arroyo	Hernando (FL)	Ryder Jones	Watauga (NC)	Ryan McMahon*	Mater Dei (CA)	
2013	Infield	Travis Demeritte	Winder-Barrow (GA)	Riley Unroe	Desert Ridge (AZ)	Drew Ward	Leedey (OK)	
2013	Infield	J. P. Crawford	Lakewood (CA)	Dustin Peterson	Gilbert (AZ)	Ronnie Dawson	Licking Heights (OH)	
2013	Outfield	Clint Frazier^{GB}	Loganville (GA)	Ivan Wilson	Ruston (LA)	Thomas Milone	Masuk (CT)	
2013	Outfield	Austin Meadows*	Grayson (GA)	Silento Sayles	Port Gibson (MS)	Jackson Lamb	Bedford (MI)	
2013	Outfield	Andrew Benintendi	Madeira (OH)	Ryan Tellez	Elk Grove (CA)	Jordan Paroubeck	Serra (CA)	
2013	Outfield	Andrew Benintendi	Madeira (OH)	Ryan Tellez	Elk Grove (CA)	Matt McPhearson	Riverdale Baptist (MD)	
2013	Pitcher	Robert Kaminsky (2)	Saint Joseph Regional (NJ)	Mark Armstrong	Clarence (NY)	Devin Williams*	Hazelwood West (MO)	
2013	Pitcher	Phil Bickford	Oaks Christian (CA)	Kohl Stewart	St. Pius X (TX)	Ryan Burnett	The Woodlands (TX)	
2013	Pitcher	Jack Flaherty	Harvard-Westlake (CA)	Ian Clarkin	Madison (CA)	Akeem Bostick	West Florence (SC)	
2013	Pitcher	Jack Flaherty	Harvard-Westlake (CA)	Ian Clarkin	Madison (CA)	Keegan Thompson	Cullman (AL)	
2013	Pitcher	Jack Flaherty	Harvard-Westlake (CA)	Ian Clarkin	Madison (CA)	Zach Farmer	Piketon (OH)	
2013	Utility	Tyler Danish	Durant (FL)	Will Crowe	Pigeon Forge (TN)	Griffin Jax	Cherry Creek (CO)	
2013	Utility	Tyler Danish	Durant (FL)	Carlos Salazar	Kerman (CA)	Kacy Clemens	Memorial (TX)	
2013	Designated hitter	Jonathan Denney	Yukon (OK)	Calvin Munson°	Francis Howell (MO)	Jake Hand	ThunderRidge (CO)	
2013	Designated hitter	Jonathan Denney	Yukon (OK)	Calvin Munson°	Francis Howell (MO)	Kevin Franklin	Gahr (CA)	
2014	Catcher	Chase Vallot	St. Thomas More (LA)	Alex Jackson^{B}	Rancho Bernardo (CA)	Nick Fortes	DeLand (FL)	
2014	Catcher	Chase Vallot	St. Thomas More (LA)	Alex Jackson^{B}	Rancho Bernardo (CA)	Jakson Reetz	Norris (NE)	
2014	First base	Michael Chavis	Sprayberry (GA)	Gavin LaValley	Carl Albert (OK)	T.J. Collett	Terre Haute North (IN)	
2014	Infield	Nick Gordon	Olympia (FL)	J. J. Matijevic	Norwin (PA)	Justin Yurchak	Shenendehowa (NY)	
2014	Infield	Trevor Ezell	Bryant (AR)	Jacob Gatewood	Clovis (CA)	Isan Diaz	Springfield Central (MA)	
2014	Infield	Cole Tucker	Mountain Pointe (AZ)	Tristan Hildebrandt	Esperanza (CA)	Ti'quan Forbes	Columbia (MS)	
2014	Infield	Cole Tucker	Mountain Pointe (AZ)	Tristan Hildebrandt	Esperanza (CA)	Justin Twine	Falls City (TX)	
2014	Outfield	Monte Harrison	Lee's Summit West (MO)	Jon Littell	Stillwater (OK)	Seth Beer	Lambert (GA)	
2014	Outfield	Derek Hill	Elk Grove (CA)	Braxton Davidson	T. C. Roberson (NC)	Cole Krzmarzick	Bishop Gorman (NV)	
2014	Outfield	Lane Thomas	Bearden (TN)	Sam Finnerty	Pelham (AL)	Marcus Wilson	Serra (CA)	
2014	Pitcher	Cameron Varga	Cincinnati Hills Christian (OH)	Brady Aiken^{#}	Cathedral Catholic (CA)	Kodi Medeiros	Waiakea (HI)	
2014	Pitcher	Tyler Kolek	Shepherd (TX)	Cody Reed	Ardmore (AL)	Alex Lange	Lee's Summit West (MO)	
2014	Pitcher	Jack Flaherty (2)	Harvard-Westlake (CA)	Justus Sheffield^{G}	Tullahoma (TN)	Michael Kopech	Mount Pleasant (TX)	
2014	Pitcher	Jack Flaherty (2)	Harvard-Westlake (CA)	Justus Sheffield^{G}	Tullahoma (TN)	Tyler Frost	Greenway (AZ)	
2014	Utility	Brian Gonzalez	Archbishop McCarthy (FL)	Brendan McKay	Blackhawk (PA)	Nic Perkins	Francis Howell (MO)	
2014	Utility	Brian Gonzalez	Archbishop McCarthy (FL)	Brendan McKay	Blackhawk (PA)	Grant Hockin	Damien (CA)	
2014	Designated hitter	Brad Mathiowetz	Mayo (MN)	Alex Destino	North Buncombe (NC)	Blake Anderson	West Lauderdale (MS)	

=== 2015–2019 ===
Year	Position	First team		Second team		Third team		Ref
Year	Position	Player	High school (state)	Player	High school (state)	Player	High school (state)	Ref
2015	Catcher	Tyler Stephenson	Kennesaw Mountain (GA)	Corey Zangari	Carl Albert (OK)	Jacob Barnwell	Boyd County (KY)	
2015	First base	Devin Davis	Valencia (CA)	Alek Manoah*	South Dade (FL)	Breyden Varner	Collinsville (OK)	
2015	Infield	Brendan Rodgers	Lake Mary (FL)	Austin Riley*	DeSoto Central (MS)	Travis Blankenhorn	Pottsville Area (PA)	
2015	Infield	Cornelius Randolph	Griffin (GA)	Charlie Donovan	Westmont (IL)	Ke'Bryan Hayes	Concordia Lutheran (TX)	
2015	Infield	Kody Clemens	Memorial (TX)	Cadyn Grenier	Bishop Gorman (NV)	Trey Cabbage	Grainger (TN)	
2015	Infield	Kody Clemens	Memorial (TX)	Cadyn Grenier	Bishop Gorman (NV)	Jeremy Eierman	Warsaw (MO)	
2015	Infield	Kody Clemens	Memorial (TX)	Cadyn Grenier	Bishop Gorman (NV)	Tyler Nevin	Poway (CA)	
2015	Infield	Kody Clemens	Memorial (TX)	Cadyn Grenier	Bishop Gorman (NV)	Nick Shumpert	Highlands Ranch (CO)	
2015	Outfield	Trent Clark	Richland (TX)	Garrett Whitley	Niskayuna (NY)	Ashton Bardzell	Ramsey (NJ)	
2015	Outfield	Dazmon Cameron	Eagle's Landing (GA)	Kyle Tucker*^{B}	H.B. Plant (FL)	Isaiah White	Greenfield (NC)	
2015	Outfield	Nick Plummer	Brother Rice (MI)	Blake Perkins	Verrado (AZ)	Josh Magee	Franklinton (LA)	
2015	Outfield	Nick Plummer	Brother Rice (MI)	Blake Perkins	Verrado (AZ)	Brandon Wulff	Bishop Gorman (NV)	
2015	Outfield	Nick Plummer	Brother Rice (MI)	Blake Perkins	Verrado (AZ)	D. J. Wilson	Canton South (OH)	
2015	Designated hitter	Gene Wood	Jackson Prep (MS)	Cole Stobbe	Millard West (NE)	Daino Deas	Parkview (GA)	
2015	Designated hitter	Gene Wood	Jackson Prep (MS)	Cole Stobbe	Millard West (NE)	Ryan January	Swampscott (MA)	
2015	Utility	Bryce Denton	Ravenwood (TN)	Wesley Rodriguez	George Washington (NY)	Luken Baker^{G}	Oak Ridge (TX)	
2015	Utility	Bryce Denton	Ravenwood (TN)	Wesley Rodriguez	George Washington (NY)	Joe DeMers	College Park (CA)	
2015	Pitcher	Max Wotell	Marvin Ridge (NC)	Triston McKenzie	Royal Palm Beach (FL)	Ian Anderson	Shenendehowa (NY)	
2015	Pitcher	Bryan Hudson	Alton (IL)	Jason Barber	Oxford (MS)	Mike Nikorak	Stroudsburg (PA)	
2015	Pitcher	Peter Lambert	San Dimas (CA)	Drew Finley	Rancho Bernardo (CA)	Nolan Watson	Lawrence North (IN)	
2015	Pitcher	Peter Lambert	San Dimas (CA)	Drew Finley	Rancho Bernardo (CA)	Ian Oxnevad	Shorewood (WA)	
2016	Catcher	Sam Huff	Arcadia (AZ)	Thomas Dillard	Oxford (MS)	Ben Rortvedt	Verona Area (WI)	
2016	First base	Dylan Carlson	Elk Grove (CA)	Zach Linginfelter	Sevier County (TN)	Walker Robbins	George County (MS)	
2016	Infield	Bo Bichette*	Lakewood (FL)	Nick Quintana	Arbor View (NV)	Nathaniel Garley	Eldorado (NM)	
2016	Infield	Joshua Lowe	Pope (GA)	Ryan Vilade	Frisco (TX)	Josh Jung*	MacArthur (TX)	
2016	Infield	Gavin Lux	Indian Trail (WI)	Cole Stobbe (2)	Millard West (NE)	Duncan Pence	Farragut (TN)	
2016	Infield	Gavin Lux	Indian Trail (WI)	Cole Stobbe (2)	Millard West (NE)	Nolan Jones	Holy Ghost Prep (PA)	
2016	Outfield	Mickey Moniak^{#B}	La Costa Canyon (CA)	Blake Rutherford	Chaminade (CA)	Dante Baldelli	Bishop Hendricken (RI)	
2016	Outfield	Taylor Trammell	Mount Paran Christian (GA)	Khalil Lee	Flint Hill (VA)	Jack Duffy	Staley (MO)	
2016	Outfield	Alex Kirilloff	Plum (PA)	Conner Uselton	Southmoore (OK)	Nick Webre	Teurlings Catholic (LA)	
2016	Outfield	Alex Kirilloff	Plum (PA)	Conner Uselton	Southmoore (OK)	Quin Cotton	Regis Jesuit (CO)	
2016	Utility	Evan Lee	Bryant (AR)	Luca Dalatri	Christian Brothers (NJ)	Christian Camacho	Elk Grove (IL)	
2016	Utility	Evan Lee	Bryant (AR)	Luca Dalatri	Christian Brothers (NJ)	Connor Basler	Valle Catholic (MO)	
2016	Designated hitter	Zach Watson	West Ouachita (LA)	Zach Thompson	Wapahani (IN)	Pat DeMarco	Winder-Barrow (GA)	
2016	Pitcher	Joey Wentz	Shawnee Mission East (KS)	Grant Gambrell	Buchanan (CA)	Jared Horn	Vintage (CA)	
2016	Pitcher	Ian Anderson (2)	Shenendehowa (NY)	Sean Reynolds	Redondo Union (CA)	Jason Groome	Barnegat (NJ)	
2016	Pitcher	Bryse Wilson	Orange (NC)	Braxton Garrett	Florence (AL)	Cole Ragans*	North Florida Christian (FL)	
2016	Pitcher	Bryse Wilson	Orange (NC)	Braxton Garrett	Florence (AL)	Riley Pint	Saint Thomas Aquinas (KS)	
2016	Pitcher	Bryse Wilson	Orange (NC)	Braxton Garrett	Florence (AL)	Jake Greenwalt	Windsor (CO)	
2017	Catcher	Luis Campusano	Cross Creek (GA)	Blake Hunt	Mater Dei (CA)	Casey Opitz	Heritage (CO)	
2017	First base	Nick Pratto	Huntington Beach (CA)	Bobby Seymour	Mount Carmel (IL)	Kody Milton	Severna Park (MD)	
2017	First base	Nick Pratto	Huntington Beach (CA)	Bobby Seymour	Mount Carmel (IL)	Terriez Fuller	Griffin (GA)	
2017	Infield	Jeter Downs	Pace (FL)	Buddy Kennedy	Millville (NJ)	Danny Hosley	Langley (VA)	
2017	Infield	Royce Lewis^{#}	JSerra Catholic (CA)	Jacob Gonzalez	Chaparral (AZ)	Mark Vientos	American Heritage (FL)	
2017	Infield	Ryan Vilade (2)	Stillwater (OK)	Hunter Greene*	Notre Dame (CA)	Grant Wood	Jefferson City (MO)	
2017	Infield	Ryan Vilade (2)	Stillwater (OK)	Hunter Greene*	Notre Dame (CA)	Liam Eddy	Brighton (CO)	
2017	Outfield	Austin Beck	North Davidson (NC)	Bubba Thompson	McGill-Toolen (AL)	Quentin Holmes	Monsignor McClancy (NY)	
2017	Outfield	Drew Waters	Etowah (GA)	Jacob Pearson	West Monroe (LA)	Kyle Grantham	Francis Howell (MO)	
2017	Outfield	Jordon Adell	Ballard (KY)	Tristen Lutz	Martin (TX)	Calvin Mitchell	Rancho Bernardo (CA)	
2017	Outfield	Jordon Adell	Ballard (KY)	Tristen Lutz	Martin (TX)	Justin Bullock	South Granville (NC)	
2017	Designated hitter	Tyler Freeman	Etiwanda (CA)	Brett Owen	Blanchard (OK)	Hunter Gustafson	Webster (WI)	
2017	Utility	Christian Chamberlain	Reno (NV)	Nick Storz	Poly Prep (NY)	Conner VanCleave	Holcomb (KS)	
2017	Pitcher	MacKenzie Gore*^{GB}	Whiteville (NC)	D.L. Hall	Valdosta (GA)	Jake Jackson	El Toro (CA)	
2017	Pitcher	Trevor Rogers*	Carlsbad (NM)	Hagen Danner	Huntington Beach (CA)	Alex Scherff	Colleyville Heritage (TX)	
2017	Pitcher	Shane Baz	Concordia Lutheran (TX)	Sam Carlson	Burnsville (MN)	Charlie Neuweiler	Monsignor McClancy (NY)	
2017	Pitcher	Shane Baz	Concordia Lutheran (TX)	Sam Carlson	Burnsville (MN)	Cameron Cotter	Northern Guilford (NC)	
2017	Pitcher	Shane Baz	Concordia Lutheran (TX)	Sam Carlson	Burnsville (MN)	Jacob Heatherly	Cullman (AL)	
2018	Catcher	Will Banfield	Brookwood (GA)	Matt McCormick	St. Laurence (IL)	Andrew Cossetti	La Salle (PA)	
2018	First base	Grant Lavigne	Bedford (NH)	Justin Olson	Pine Creek (CO)	Kody Milton (2)	Severna Park (MD)	
2018	First base	Grant Lavigne	Bedford (NH)	Justin Olson	Pine Creek (CO)	Cade Beloso	John Curtis (LA)	
2018	Infield	Jeremiah Jackson	St. Luke's Episcopal (AL)	Brice Turang	Santiago (CA)	Matt McLain	Beckman (CA)	
2018	Infield	Triston Casas	American Heritage (FL)	Bobby Witt Jr.*^{GB}	Colleyville Heritage (TX)	Jonathan Ornelas	Kellis (AZ)	
2018	Infield	Nolan Gorman	O'Connor (AZ)	Ryan Archibald	John Carroll (MD)	Cameron Chick	Hickman (MO)	
2018	Outfield	Jordyn Adams	Green Hope (NC)	Jack Washburn	Webster (WI)	Ryder Green	Karns (TN)	
2018	Outfield	Connor Scott	H.B. Plant (FL)	Kingston Liniak	Mission Hills (CA)	Alek Thomas	Mount Carmel (IL)	
2018	Outfield	Nicholas Schnell	Roncalli (IN)	Joe Gray	Hattiesburg (MS)	Brennen Davis	Basha (AZ)	
2018	Outfield	Nicholas Schnell	Roncalli (IN)	Joe Gray	Hattiesburg (MS)	Micah Bello	Hilo (HI)	
2018	Designated hitter	Jace Bohrofen	Westmoore (OK)	Austin Wells	Bishop Gorman (NV)	Haydn McGeary	Thunderbird (AZ)	
2018	Utility	Anthony Seigler	Cartersville (GA)	Luke Mann	St. John Vianney (MO)	Nick Decker	Seneca (NJ)	
2018	Utility	Anthony Seigler	Cartersville (GA)	Luke Mann	St. John Vianney (MO)	Connor Noland	Greenwood (AR)	
2018	Pitcher	Gunnar Hoglund	Fivay (FL)	Matt Liberatore	Mountain Ridge (AZ)	Lineras Torres Jr.	Beacon (NY)	
2018	Pitcher	Ryan Weathers^{G}	Loretto (TN)	J. T. Ginn	Brandon (MS)	Owen White	Jesse Carson (NC)	
2018	Pitcher	Cole Winn^{B}	Orange Lutheran (CA)	Mason Denaburg	Merritt Island (FL)	Joey Magrisi	Torrey Pines (CA)	
2018	Pitcher	Cole Winn^{B}	Orange Lutheran (CA)	Mason Denaburg	Merritt Island (FL)	Carter Stewart	Eau Gallie (FL)	
2018	Pitcher	Cole Winn^{B}	Orange Lutheran (CA)	Mason Denaburg	Merritt Island (FL)	Willie Weiss	Westview (OR)	
2019	Catcher	Jonathan French	Parkview (GA)	Kody Huff	Horizon (AZ)	Jack Bulger	DeMatha Catholic (MD)	
2019	Catcher	Jonathan French	Parkview (GA)	Kody Huff	Horizon (AZ)	Micah Yonamine	Iolani (HI)	
2019	First base	Jace Bohrofen (2)	Westmoore (OK)	Jordan Beck	Hazel Green (AL)	Joe Naranjo	Ayala (CA)	
2019	Infield	CJ Abrams*	Blessed Trinity Catholic (GA)	Anthony Volpe	Delbarton (NJ)	Luke Gold	Ballston Spa (NY)	
2019	Infield	Brett Baty	Lake Travis (TX)	Gunnar Henderson	John T. Morgan (AL)	Tyler Callihan	Providence (FL)	
2019	Infield	Bobby Witt Jr.*^{GB} (2)	Colleyville Heritage (TX)	Keoni Cavaco	Eastlake (CA)	Parker Noland	Farragut (TN)	
2019	Infield	Bobby Witt Jr.*^{GB} (2)	Colleyville Heritage (TX)	Keoni Cavaco	Eastlake (CA)	Will Duff	Springfield Catholic (MO)	
2019	Outfield	Sammy Siani	William Penn (PA)	Maurice Hampton Jr.	Memphis University (TN)	Joshua Mears	Federal Way (WA)	
2019	Outfield	Riley Greene*	Hagerty (FL)	Colin Barber	Pleasant Valley (CA)	Andre Tarver	Ringgold (GA)	
2019	Outfield	Corbin Carroll*	Lakeside (WA)	Stephen Paolini	St. Joseph (CT)	Ethan Vecrumba	Edgewood (IN)	
2019	Outfield	Corbin Carroll*	Lakeside (WA)	Stephen Paolini	St. Joseph (CT)	Jack Washburn (2)	Webster (WI)	
2019	Designated hitter	Aaron Roberts	Desert Oasis (NV)	Robert Hassell	Independence (TN)	Ethan Hearn	Mobile Christian (AL)	
2019	Designated hitter	Aaron Roberts	Desert Oasis (NV)	Robert Hassell	Independence (TN)	Brenden Dixon	Argyle (TX)	
2019	Utility	Jared Jones	La Mirada (CA)	Michael Doolin	Andrean (IN)	Ronan Kopp	Scottsdale Christian (AZ)	
2019	Utility	Jared Jones	La Mirada (CA)	Michael Doolin	Andrean (IN)	Blake Walston	New Hanover (NC)	
2019	Pitcher	Matthew Allan	Seminole (FL)	Jack Leiter	Delbarton (NJ)	Joe Clancy	Westfield (VA)	
2019	Pitcher	Chris McElvain	Summit (TN)	Matthew Thompson	Cypress Ranch (TX)	Ryan Hagenow	Farragut (TN)	
2019	Pitcher	JJ Goss	Cypress Ranch (TX)	Quinn Priester	Cary-Grove (IL)	Drew Gilbert	Stillwater (MN)	
2019	Pitcher	JJ Goss	Cypress Ranch (TX)	Quinn Priester	Cary-Grove (IL)	Kale Davis	Westmoore (OK)	
2019	Pitcher	JJ Goss	Cypress Ranch (TX)	Quinn Priester	Cary-Grove (IL)	Stephen Klenske	Sage Creek (CA)	

=== 2020–2024 ===
Year	Position	First team		Second team		Third team		Ref
Year	Position	Player	High school (state)	Player	High school (state)	Player	High school (state)	Ref
2020	No team selected due to COVID-19 pandemic							
2021	Catcher	Harry Ford	North Cobb (GA)	Joe Mack	Williamsville East (NY)	Carter Jensen	Park Hill (MO)	
2021	First base	Carson Benge	Yukon (OK)	Mike Kennedy	Troy (NY)	Greysen Carter	Fairview (CO)	
2021	First base	Carson Benge	Yukon (OK)	Mike Kennedy	Troy (NY)	Jared Everson	Aquinas (WI)	
2021	Infield	Jordan Lawlar	Jesuit College Prep (TX)	Max Muncy	Thousand Oaks (CA)	Cooper Kinney	Baylor School (TN)	
2021	Infield	Marcelo Mayer	Eastlake (CA)	Noah Miller	Ozaukee (WI)	Cody Schrier	JSerra Catholic (CA)	
2021	Infield	Brady House	Winder-Barrow (GA)	Kahlil Watson	Wake Forest (NC)	Slate Alford	Bob Jones (AL)	
2021	Infield	Brady House	Winder-Barrow (GA)	Kahlil Watson	Wake Forest (NC)	Jackson Holliday^{#B}	Stillwater (OK)	
2021	Infield	Brady House	Winder-Barrow (GA)	Kahlil Watson	Wake Forest (NC)	Colson Montgomery	Southridge (IN)	
2021	Outfield	Daylen Lile	Trinity (KY)	John Kramer	Lafayette (MO)	Lonnie White Jr.	Malvern (PA)	
2021	Outfield	Tyler Whitaker	Bishop Gorman (NV)	Brock Selvidge	Hamilton (AZ)	Chase Mason	Viborg-Hurley (SD)	
2021	Outfield	Druw Jones	Wesleyan (GA)	Jordan Viars	Reedy (TX)	Josh Baez	Dexter Southfield (MA)	
2021	Outfield	Druw Jones	Wesleyan (GA)	Jordan Viars	Reedy (TX)	Jay Allen	John Carroll (MD)	
2021	Outfield	Druw Jones	Wesleyan (GA)	Jordan Viars	Reedy (TX)	Braden Montgomery	Madison Central (MS)	
2021	Designated hitter	James Triantos	Madison (VA)	Sal Stewart*	Westminster Christian (FL)	Roc Riggio	Thousand Oaks (CA)	
2021	Designated hitter	James Triantos	Madison (VA)	Sal Stewart*	Westminster Christian (FL)	Collin Reuter	Magnolia Heights (MS)	
2021	Utility	Carson Williams	Torrey Pines (CA)	Owen Washburn	Webster (WI)	Bubba Chandler	North Oconee (GA)	
2021	Pitcher	Jackson Jobe^{B}	Heritage Hall (OK)	Brock Porter^{G}	St. Mary's Prep (MI)	Drew Christo	Elkhorn (NE)	
2021	Pitcher	Frank Mozzicato	East Catholic (CT)	Samuel Dutton	Westbrook Christian (AL)	Carson Liggett	Blue Valley (KS)	
2021	Pitcher	Gage Jump	JSerra Catholic (CA)	Josh Hartle	Reagan (NC)	Chase Petty	Mainland Regional (NJ)	
2022	Catcher	Malcolm Moore	McClatchy (CA)	Camden Ross	Broomfield (CO)	Ethan Frey	Rosepine (LA)	
2022	First base	Will Furniss	Nacogdoches (TX)	Xavier Issac	East Forsyth (NC)	Luke Anderson	Snow Canyon (UT)	
2022	First base	Will Furniss	Nacogdoches (TX)	Xavier Issac	East Forsyth (NC)	Brett Norfleet	Francis Howell (MO)	
2022	Infield	Jackson Holliday^{#B} (2)	Stillwater (OK)	Cutter Coffey	Liberty (CA)	R. J. Austin	Pace (GA)	
2022	Infield	Blake Mitchell	Sinton (TX)	Patrick Forbes	Bowling Green (KY)	Cade Kurland	Berkeley Prep (FL)	
2022	Infield	Judd Utermark	Charlotte Christian (NC)	Jett Williams	Rockwall-Heath (TX)	Jackson Lovich	Blue Valley West (KS)	
2022	Infield	Judd Utermark	Charlotte Christian (NC)	Jett Williams	Rockwall-Heath (TX)	Grant MacArthur	Granite Hills (CA)	
2022	Outfield	Druw Jones (2)	Wesleyan (GA)	Nicholas Morabito	Gonzaga College (DC)	Harrison Didawick	Western Branch (VA)	
2022	Outfield	Justin Crawford	Bishop Gorman (NV)	Roman Anthony	Stoneman Douglas (FL)	Max Clark^{GB}	Franklin (IN)	
2022	Outfield	Jace LaViolette	Tompkins (TX)	Dakota Jordan	Jackson (MS)	Korbyn Dickerson	Trinity (KY)	
2022	Outfield	Jace LaViolette	Tompkins (TX)	Dakota Jordan	Jackson (MS)	Dylan Dreiling	Hays (KS)	
2022	Outfield	Jace LaViolette	Tompkins (TX)	Dakota Jordan	Jackson (MS)	Henry Bolte	Palo Alto (CA)	
2022	Designated hitter	Dylan Carey	Ponderosa (CO)	Brendan Summerhill	Whitney Young (IL)	Matt Scott	Joel Barlow (CT)	
2022	Designated hitter	Dylan Carey	Ponderosa (CO)	Brendan Summerhill	Whitney Young (IL)	Sal Stewart* (2)	Westminster Christian (FL)	
2022	Designated hitter	Dylan Carey	Ponderosa (CO)	Brendan Summerhill	Whitney Young (IL)	Anthony Martinez	De La Salle (CA)	
2022	Utility	Owen Murphy	Riverside Brookfield (IL)	Austin Charles	Stockdale (CA)	Ky Hoskinson	McMinnville (OR)	
2022	Utility	Owen Murphy	Riverside Brookfield (IL)	Austin Charles	Stockdale (CA)	Mitchell Voit	Whitefish Bay (WI)	
2022	Pitcher	Brock Porter^{G} (2)	St. Mary's Prep (MI)	Justin Lamkin	Calallen (TX)	Nolan Perry	Carlsbad (NM)	
2022	Pitcher	Robby Snelling	McQueen (NV)	Riley Quick	Hewitt-Trussville (AL)	Thomas White	Phillips Andover (MA)	
2022	Pitcher	Eli Jerzembeck	Providence (NC)	Brennan Phillips	Owasso (OK)	Jaden Noot	Sierra Canyon (CA)	
2022	Pitcher	Eli Jerzembeck	Providence (NC)	Brennan Phillips	Owasso (OK)	Karson Milbrandt	Liberty (MO)	
2022	Pitcher	Eli Jerzembeck	Providence (NC)	Brennan Phillips	Owasso (OK)	Elliott Bray	Hartselle (AL)	
2023	Catcher	Blake Mitchell (2)	Sinton (TX)	Trever Baumler	Dowling Catholic (IA)	Ryder Helfrick	Clayton Valley Charter (CA)	
2023	Catcher	Blake Mitchell (2)	Sinton (TX)	Trever Baumler	Dowling Catholic (IA)	Mark Gialluisi	St. Joseph (NJ)	
2023	First base	Dylan Cupp	Cedartown (GA)	Gage Gundy	Stillwater (OK)	Easton Shelton	Bishop Gorman (NV)	
2023	First base	Dylan Cupp	Cedartown (GA)	Gage Gundy	Stillwater (OK)	Joey McMannis^{G}	Catoctin (MD)	
2023	Infield	Colin Houck	Parkview (GA)	Sam Stafura	Walter Panas (NY)	Arjun Nimmala	Strawberry Crest (FL)	
2023	Infield	Walker Martin	Eaton (CO)	Roch Cholowsky^{#}	Hamilton (AZ)	Trent Caraway	JSerra Catholic (CA)	
2023	Infield	Kevin Takeuchi	Rancho Bernardo (CA)	Konnor Griffin^{GB} (2)	Jackson Prep (MS)	Kevin McGonigle*	Bonner-Prendergast (PA)	
2023	Infield	Kevin Takeuchi	Rancho Bernardo (CA)	Konnor Griffin^{GB} (2)	Jackson Prep (MS)	Steven Milam	Centennial (NM)	
2023	Infield	Kevin Takeuchi	Rancho Bernardo (CA)	Konnor Griffin^{GB} (2)	Jackson Prep (MS)	Ethan Holliday^{B}	Stillwater (OK)	
2023	Outfield	Drew Burress	Houston County (GA)	Bristol Carter	Northwest Guilford (NC)	Slade Caldwell	Valley View (AR)	
2023	Outfield	Max Clark^{GB} (2)	Franklin (IN)	Braxton Thomas	Central Catholic (CA)	Brady Ballinger	Green Valley (NV)	
2023	Outfield	Aidan Smith	Lovejoy (TX)	Walker Jenkins	South Brunswick (NC)	Tai Peete	Trinity Christian (GA)	
2023	Outfield	Aidan Smith	Lovejoy (TX)	Walker Jenkins	South Brunswick (NC)	Brock Eddy	Brighton (CO)	
2023	Designated hitter	Braden Holcomb	Foundation Academy (FL)	Ryder Robinson	American Fork (UT)	Adam Buerger	Lincoln (OH)	
2023	Designated hitter	Braden Holcomb	Foundation Academy (FL)	Ryder Robinson	American Fork (UT)	Jackson DiLorenzo	Walter Panas (NY)	
2023	Designated hitter	Braden Holcomb	Foundation Academy (FL)	Ryder Robinson	American Fork (UT)	Tyler August	Delaware Military Academy (DE)	
2023	Utility	Bryce Eldridge	James Madison (VA)	Dylan Loy	Pigeon Forge (TN)	Matt Thorsen	Chatham (NY)	
2023	Utility	Bryce Eldridge	James Madison (VA)	Dylan Loy	Pigeon Forge (TN)	Luke Dotson	Mount Paran Christian (GA)	
2023	Utility	Bryce Eldridge	James Madison (VA)	Dylan Loy	Pigeon Forge (TN)	Cooper Pratt	Magnolia Heights (MS)	
2023	Pitcher	Christian Rodriguez	Stoneman Douglas (FL)	Ross Felder	Har-Ber (AR)	Kash Mayfield	Elk City (OK)	
2023	Pitcher	Noble Meyer	Jesuit (OR)	Gabe Gaeckle	Aptos (CA)	Blake Wolters	Mahomet-Seymour (IL)	
2023	Pitcher	Tate McGuire	Liberty (MO)	Robert Satin	H.B. Plant (FL)	Steven Echavarria	Millburn (NJ)	
2023	Pitcher	Tate McGuire	Liberty (MO)	Robert Satin	H.B. Plant (FL)	Alex Clemmey	Bishop Hendricken (RI)	
2023	Pitcher	Tate McGuire	Liberty (MO)	Robert Satin	H.B. Plant (FL)	Destin Allen-Fox	Santana (CA)	
2024	Catcher	Cade Arrambide	Tomball (TX)	Hogan Denny	Mooresville (IN)	Taitn Gray	Dallas Center–Grimes (IA)	
2024	Catcher	Cade Arrambide	Tomball (TX)	Hogan Denny	Mooresville (IN)	Hunter Carns	First Coast (FL)	
2024	First base	AJ Evasco	Lincoln East (NE)	Braiden Reynolds	La Cueva (NM)	Tate Medicoff	Sacred Heart Cathedral (CA)	
2024	First base	AJ Evasco	Lincoln East (NE)	Braiden Reynolds	La Cueva (NM)	Parker Wright	Frank W. Cox (VA)	
2024	Infield	Cade Brown	Parkview (GA)	Devin Fitz-Gerald	Stoneman Douglas (FL)	Trey Snyder	Liberty North (MO)	
2024	Infield	Eli Evans	Farragut (TN)	Tyson Lewis	Millard West (NE)	Brock Thompson	Liberty (CA)	
2024	Infield	Bryce Rainer	Harvard-Westlake (CA)	Dalton Wentz	Amherst County (VA)	John Pearson	West Monroe (LA)	
2024	Infield	Boston Kellner	Hamilton (AZ)	Tomas Valincius	Baylor School (TN)	Tucker Swails	Patrick County (VA)	
2024	Infield	Boston Kellner	Hamilton (AZ)	Tomas Valincius	Baylor School (TN)	Gavin Smith	Basha (AZ)	
2024	Infield	Boston Kellner	Hamilton (AZ)	Tomas Valincius	Baylor School (TN)	Owen Paino	Roy C. Ketcham (NY)	
2024	Outfield	PJ Morlando	Summerville (SC)	Jaden Fauske	Nazareth (IL)	Cole Pladson	Clay Center (KS)	
2024	Outfield	Isaac Sturgess	Powers Catholic (MI)	Tyler Paul Wentworth	Central Catholic (CA)	Michael Mullinax	North Cobb Christian (GA)	
2024	Outfield	Slade Caldwell (2)	Valley View (AR)	Jack Haferkamp	Santa Fe Christian (CA)	Jace Souza	Kamehameha Kapalama (HI)	
2024	Outfield	Jackson Kircher	Little Rock Christian (AR)	Griffin Crain	Bishop Hendricken (RI)	Ty Head	Windermere (FL)	
2024	Outfield	Jackson Kircher	Little Rock Christian (AR)	Griffin Crain	Bishop Hendricken (RI)	Sawyer Strosnider	Brock (TX)	
2024	Designated hitter	Joseph Parker	Purvis (MS)	Bryson Casto	Ripley (WV)	Matt Conte	Dexter Southfield (MA)	
2024	Utility	Konnor Griffin^{GB}	Jackson Prep (MS)	Kruz Schoolcraft	Sunset (OR)	Perry Hargett	Metrolina Christian (NC)	
2024	Utility	Seth Hernandez^{G}	Corona (CA)	Johnny King	Naples (FL)	Colin Nowaczyk	Elkhorn North (NE)	
2024	Utility	Seth Hernandez^{G}	Corona (CA)	Johnny King	Naples (FL)	Jake Hanley	Mason (OH)	
2024	Pitcher	Kash Mayfield (2)	Elk City (OK)	Joey Oakie	Ankeny Centennial (IA)	Mateo Gray	North Broward Prep (FL)	
2024	Pitcher	Ethan Schiefelbein	Corona (CA)	Kyle DeGroat	Wallkill (NY)	Wade Walton	Newsome (FL)	
2024	Pitcher	Boston Bateman	Camarillo (CA)	Dax Whitney	Blackfoot (ID)	William Schmidt	Catholic (LA)	
2024	Pitcher	Cam Caminiti	Saguaro (AZ)	Lance Davis	Valley View (AR)	Camron Seagraves	Grace Christian (NC)	
2024	Pitcher	Cam Caminiti	Saguaro (AZ)	Lance Davis	Valley View (AR)	Mason Brassfield	Bakersfield Christian (CA)	

=== 2025–present ===
Year	Position	First team		Second team		Third team		Ref
Year	Position	Player	High school (state)	Player	High school (state)	Player	High school (state)	Ref
2025	Catcher	Korbin Reynolds	Clarksville (TN)	Cash Williams	Choctaw (OK)	Michael Oliveto	Hauppauge (NY)	
2025	First base	Blake Lundy	Baylor School (TN)	Dax Kilby	Newnan (GA)	Dylan Minnatee	Franklin (CA)	
2025	First base	Blake Lundy	Baylor School (TN)	Dax Kilby	Newnan (GA)	Connor Larkin	Cherry Creek (CO)	
2025	Infield	Ethan Holliday^{B} (2)	Stillwater (OK)	Daniel Pierce	Mill Creek (GA)	Tate Southisene	Basic (NV)	
2025	Infield	Eli Willits^{#}	Fort Cobb-Broxton (OK)	Steele Hall	Hewitt-Trussville (AL)	Jordan Yost	Sickles (FL)	
2025	Infield	Kayson Cunningham	Johnson (TX)	Boston Kellner (2)	Hamilton (AZ)	Cam Righi	Wethersfield (CT)	
2025	Infield	Coy James	Davie County (NC)	Billy Carlson	Corona (CA)	Ryan Mitchell	Houston (TN)	
2025	Infield	Coy James	Davie County (NC)	Billy Carlson	Corona (CA)	Casey Cuddyer	Great Bridge (VA)	
2025	Infield	Coy James	Davie County (NC)	Billy Carlson	Corona (CA)	Nolan Sissom	Fort Zumwalt West (MO)	
2025	Infield	Coy James	Davie County (NC)	Billy Carlson	Corona (CA)	Alexander Mercurius	Durango (NV)	
2025	Infield	Coy James	Davie County (NC)	Billy Carlson	Corona (CA)	Jet Berry	Queen Creek (AZ)	
2025	Outfield	Jaden Fauske (2)	Nazareth (IL)	Josh Proctor	Maranatha (CA)	JoJo Parker	Purvis (MS)	
2025	Outfield	Alec Blair	De La Salle (CA)	Josiah Hartshorn	Orange Lutheran (CA)	Ryan Harwood	Casteel (AZ)	
2025	Outfield	Brock Sell	Tokay (CA)	Thomas Conrad	Greenbrier Christian (VA)	Eric Hines	American Christian (AL)	
2025	Outfield	Malachi Washington	Parkview (GA)	Taitn Gray (2)	Dallas Center–Grimes (IA)	Joe Chiarodo	Edwardsville (IL)	
2025	Outfield	Malachi Washington	Parkview (GA)	Taitn Gray (2)	Dallas Center–Grimes (IA)	Christian Turner	Haughton (LA)	
2025	Utility	Evan O'Connor	Brock (TX)	Michael Teasley	Oak Ridge (TN)	Jayden Stroman	Patchogue-Medford (NY)	
2025	Utility	Brody Irlbeck	Staley (MO)	Mason McCraine	Glenwood (AL)	Connor Essenburg	Lincoln-Way West (IL)	
2025	Utility	Brody Irlbeck	Staley (MO)	Mason McCraine	Glenwood (AL)	Gabriel Milano	Doral (FL)	
2025	Pitcher	Seth Hernandez^{G} (2)	Corona (CA)	Aaron Watson	Trinity Christian (FL)	Brandon Shannon	McHenry (IL)	
2025	Pitcher	Gio Rojas	Stoneman Douglas (FL)	Graham Schlicht	De La Salle (CA)	Jackson Estes	North Little Rock (AR)	
2025	Pitcher	Michael Winter	Shawnee Mission East (KS)	Case Gibbs	Metrolina Christian (NC)	Justice de Jong	Poly Prep (NY)	
2025	Pitcher	Kruz Schoolcraft (2)	Sunset (OR)	Miguel Sime	Poly Prep (NY)	Brett Crossland	Mountain Pointe (AZ)	
2025	Pitcher	Kruz Schoolcraft (2)	Sunset (OR)	Miguel Sime	Poly Prep (NY)	Kellen Karr	North Lincoln (NC)	
2025	Pitcher	Kruz Schoolcraft (2)	Sunset (OR)	Miguel Sime	Poly Prep (NY)	Cooper Underwood	Allatoona (GA)	
2025	Pitcher	Kruz Schoolcraft (2)	Sunset (OR)	Miguel Sime	Poly Prep (NY)	Johnny Slawinski	Johnson City (TX)	
2026	Catcher	Will Brick	Christian Brothers (TN)	Teagan Scott	South Salem (OR)	Eli Smith	George Washington (WV)	
2026	First base	Will Adams	Hoover (AL)	Dominic Santarelli	St. Joseph (WI)	Kellan Tom	Corona del Sol (AZ)	
2026	Infield	Brady Cunningham	Brother Rice (IL)	Jack Dugan	Lipscomb Academy (TN)	Anthony Del Angel	Cleveland (NM)	
2026	Infield	Cole Prosek	Magnolia Heights (MS)	Hudson Morgan	Marlow (OK)	Jacob Lombard	Gulliver Prep (FL)	
2026	Infield	Landon Thome	Nazareth (IL)	Beau Peterson	Mill Valley (KS)	Taj Marchand	James Island (SC)	
2026	Infield	James Tronstein	Harvard-Westlake (CA)	Will Plunkett	Mamaroneck (NY)	Nolan Sissom (2)	Fort Zumwalt West (MO)	
2026	Infield	James Tronstein	Harvard-Westlake (CA)	Jacob Seaman	Metrolina Christian (NC)	Ryan Ventrelle	Fairfield Prep (CT)	
2026	Outfield	Eric Booth Jr.	Oak Grove (MS)	Blake Bowen	JSerra Catholic (CA)	Drake Brentke	Brenham (TX)	
2026	Outfield	Trevor Condon	Etowah (GA)	Josiah Kemp	Choctaw (OK)	Joey Coudon	John Carroll (MD)	
2026	Outfield	Logan D'Amico	Marvin Ridge (NC)	Cole McLean	Taylor County (KY)	Vincent Lombardo	Fairfield Prep (CT)	
2026	Outfield	Malachi Washington (2)	Parkview (GA)	Martin Shelar	Marist (GA)	Alex Weingartner	St. Augustine Prep (NJ)	
2026	Outfield	Malachi Washington (2)	Parkview (GA)	Martin Shelar	Marist (GA)	Grant Westphal	Blue Valley (KS)	
2026	Utility	Coleman Borthwick	South Walton (FL)	Drew Davis	Sumrall (MS)	Jensen Hirschkorn	Kingsburg (CA)	
2026	Utility	Coleman Borthwick	South Walton (FL)	Cooper Vais	Arvada West (CO)	Kade Luker	Cedar Creek (LA)	
2026	Pitcher	Brody Bumila	Bishop Feehan (MA)	Carson Boleman	Southside Christian (SC)	Blake Bryant	Citizens Christian (GA)	
2026	Pitcher	Tommy Pascanu	Sandra Day O'Connor (AZ)	Jared Grindlinger	Huntington Beach (CA)	Grey Sanders	Mulvane (KS)	
2026	Pitcher	Gio Rojas (2)	Stoneman Douglas (FL)	Michael Teasley (2)	Oak Ridge (TN)	Zane Shaw	Lawrence Free State (KS)	
2026	Pitcher	Logan Schmidt	Ganesha (CA)	Grayson Willoughby	Trinity (KY)	Jack Slightom	Lyons Township (IL)	
2026	Pitcher	Logan Schmidt	Ganesha (CA)	Grayson Willoughby	Trinity (KY)	Kolby Stringer	West Marion (MS)	

== Selections by state ==
State	First Team	Second Team	Third Team	Total
Alabama	8	14	11	33
Arkansas	9	4	11	24
Arizona	20	29	32	81
California	151	101	88	340
Colorado	8	16	27	51
Connecticut	6	7	12	25
Delaware	2	3	6	11
District of Columbia	0	4	0	4
Florida	73	68	62	203
Georgia	50	20	20	90
Hawaii	0	2	5	7
Idaho	0	0	4	4
Illinois	27	18	22	67
Indiana	9	6	11	26
Iowa	0	10	13	23
Kansas	5	8	14	27
Kentucky	11	4	3	18
Louisiana	7	11	19	37
Maine	1	1	1	3
Maryland	5	4	13	22
Massachusetts	8	11	19	38
Michigan	11	17	12	40
Minnesota	4	8	5	17
Mississippi	8	18	18	44
Missouri	9	11	23	43
Nebraska	4	9	5	18
Nevada	14	8	12	34
New Hampshire	2	1	2	5
New Jersey	19	11	18	48
New Mexico	2	5	12	19
New York	14	26	35	75
North Carolina	17	19	17	53
Ohio	18	13	8	39
Oklahoma	27	24	14	65
Oregon	5	8	7	20
Pennsylvania	17	9	14	40
Rhode Island	2	3	5	10
South Carolina	11	4	7	22
South Dakota	0	0	1	1
Tennessee	12	18	13	43
Texas	68	50	41	159
Utah	1	4	6	11
Virginia	12	11	14	37
Washington	12	13	14	39
West Virginia	0	2	5	7
Wisconsin	1	7	10	18

== See also ==
- USA Today All-USA high school baseball team
- Under Armour All-America Baseball Game
