= PFHS =

PFHS may refer to:

- Pigeon Forge High School, Pigeon Forge, Tennessee, United States
- Post Falls High School, Post Falls, Idaho, United States
- Potomac Falls High School, Sterling, Virginia, United States
