= James Bonnici =

American baseball player

- First baseman
- Born: January 21, 1972 (age 53); Omaha, Nebraska, U.S.
- Batted: Right Threw: Right

NPB debut
- October 5, 1997, for the Orix BlueWave

Last NPB appearance
- April 25, 1998, for the Orix BlueWave

NPB statistics
- Batting average: .000
- Home runs: 0
- Runs batted in: 0
- Stats at Baseball Reference

Teams
- Orix BlueWave (1997–1998)

James Wade Bonnici (born January 21, 1972, in Omaha, Nebraska) is an American former professional baseball player. At his highest level he played for the Orix BlueWave in the Japan Pacific League.
