= Chatham High School (New York) =

High school in Chatham, New York, United States

Location
- 50 Woodbridge Avenue; Chatham, (Columbia County), New York 12037; United States
- Coordinates: 42°21′39″N 73°36′34″W

Information
- School type: Public school (government funded), high school
- School district: Chatham Central School District
- NCES District ID: 3607110
- Superintendent: Andrew Kourt
- NCES School ID: 360711000500
- Principal: Miles Wheat
- Faculty: 34.59 (on an FTE basis)
- Grades: 9–12
- Enrollment: 309 (2023-2024)
- Student to teacher ratio: 8.93
- Campus: Rural: Distant
- Colors: Scarlet and black
- Mascot: Panthers
- Feeder schools: Chatham Middle School

Chatham High School is a rural secondary school (grades 9–12) in Chatham, Columbia County, New York.

CHS is the sole High School operated by the Chatham Central School District.

In 2006, CHS has 520 students in grades 9 to 12. In 2010 the enrollment was 451.
