= Greg Peavey =

American professional baseball pitcher (born 1988)

- Pitcher
- Born: July 11, 1988 (age 37); Vancouver, Washington
- Bats: Right Throws: Right
- Stats at Baseball Reference
Medals
Men's baseball
Representing United States
World Junior Baseball Championship
Silver medal – second place	2006 Sancti Spíritus	Team

Gregory S. Peavey (born July 11, 1988) is an American professional baseball pitcher.

== Biography ==
Peavey attended Hudson's Bay High School in Vancouver, Washington, where he played baseball and basketball. The New York Yankees selected him in the 24th round of the 2007 MLB draft, but he did not sign. He enrolled at Oregon State University, and played college baseball for the Oregon State Beavers baseball team. In 2008 and 2009, he played collegiate summer baseball with the Yarmouth–Dennis Red Sox of the Cape Cod Baseball League, and returned to the league in 2010 to play for the Harwich Mariners. After his sophomore year at Oregon State, the Houston Astros selected Peavey in the 32nd round of the 2009 MLB draft. Peavey did not sign, returning to Oregon State for his junior year. The New York Mets selected Peavey in the sixth round, with the 182nd overall selection, of the 2010 MLB draft. He agreed to a contract with the Mets.

In 2014, Peavey pitched for the Binghamton Mets of the Class AA Eastern League. He was named the team's pitcher of the year at the end of the season. At the 2014 Winter Meetings, the Minnesota Twins selected Peavey from the Mets in the Rule 5 draft. In 2015, Peavey pitched for the Chattanooga Lookouts of the Class AA Southern League and the Rochester Red Wings of the Class AAA International League. Peavy finished 2015 with a combined 5.02 ERA between both clubs.

During the offseasons, Peavey returns to Hudson's Bay and serves as an assistant coach on the basketball team.

He is currently the head baseball coach at Hudson’s Bay High School.
