= Druw Jones =

American baseball player (born 2003)

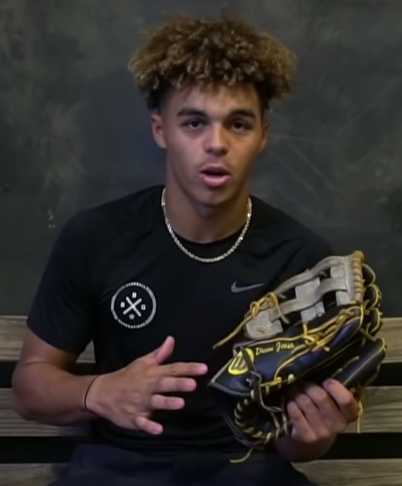
- Jones in 2021

Arizona Diamondbacks
- Center fielder
- Born: November 28, 2003 (age 22); Atlanta, Georgia, U.S.
- Bats: Right Throws: Right
- Stats at Baseball Reference

Andruw Nicholas Jones (born November 28, 2003) is an American professional baseball outfielder for the Arizona Diamondbacks of Major League Baseball (MLB). He was drafted second overall by the Diamondbacks in the 2022 MLB draft.

== Amateur career ==
As a child, Jones would practice hitting tee balls off of water bottles. He subsequently played golf, but found that summers in Atlanta were too hot for the sport and quit. Jones played organized baseball on travel teams, but elected to focus on basketball during the school year as a student of Wesleyan School in Peachtree Corners, Georgia. He played basketball until partway through his ninth grade year, when he asked to try out for the baseball team. As a junior in 2021, he was the Gwinnett Daily Post Baseball Player of the Year after hitting .445 with 16 home runs and 39 runs batted in (RBIs). Jones finished his senior year in 2022 with a .570 batting average, 13 home runs, 39 RBIs, 72 runs, 33 walks, and 32 stolen bases. He committed to Vanderbilt University to play college baseball.

== Professional career ==
Considered one of the top prospects for the 2022 Major League Baseball draft, the Arizona Diamondbacks selected Jones with the second overall selection. Jones signed with the Diamondbacks, receiving a reported signing bonus of $8,185,100. On July 26, it was revealed that Jones suffered a left shoulder injury while taking his first batting practice with the organization. He underwent surgery on August 3 to repair the posterior labrum in the shoulder.

Jones made his professional debut in 2023 with the Diamondbacks' Single-A affiliate, the Visalia Rawhide. He missed time due to quadriceps and hamstring injuries, spending time on a rehab assignment with the rookie-level Arizona Complex League Diamondbacks before returning to Visalia. Over 41 games, he hit .238 with two home runs and 12 RBIs. Back at Visalia in 2024, Jones batted .275 with six home runs, 65 RBIs, and 21 stolen bases over 109 games. He played for the High-A Hillsboro Hops in 2025, batting .255 with 5 home runs and 28 steals in 123 games.

On April 29, 2026, while playing for the Double-A Amarillo Sod Poodles, Jones hit for the cycle, the first in Sod Poodles franchise history.

== International career ==
Jones played for the Netherlands in the 2026 World Baseball Classic (WBC). He played in all four WBC games for the Dutch team, batting .400 with two RBI.

== Personal life ==
Jones is the son of Hall of Fame MLB player Andruw Jones. Andruw managed Jones in the Netherlands in the 2026 WBC.
