= Moravia Central School District =

School district in the U.S. state of New York

Location
- Moravia, New York United States

District information
- Superintendent: Dr. Christopher Leahey
- Schools: 2

Students and staff
- Students: ~845
- District mascot: Blue Devils

Other information
- Website: Moravia Central School District

Moravia Central School District is a school district in Moravia, New York. The superintendent is Dr. Christopher Leahey. The district operates two schools, the Moravia Jr. Sr. High School and Millard Fillmore Elementary School.

== Administration ==
The district offices are located at 68 South Main Street. The current superintendent is Dr. Christopher Leahey.

=== History ===
==== Selected former superintendents ====
- Howard P. Lapidus
- William P. Tammaro–?-2008
- Gordon Klumpp–2008-2010
- Michelle Brantner
- John P. Birmingham

== Moravia High School ==
Moravia Jr. Sr. High School
- Moravia, Cayuga, New York 13118; United States

Information
- Motto: Make a Better World
- CEEB code: 333-215
- NCES School ID: 361980001813
- Principal: Jeff Green
- Grades: 7-12
- Colors: Navy Blue, White
- Song: Far Above Cayuga Waters
- Athletics conference: IAC
- Sports: Basketball, Baseball, Football, Softball, Golf, Tennis, Volleyball, Field Hockey, Track and Field, Wrestling, Cross Country
- Mascot: Blue Devils
- Website: www.moraviaschool.org/home-7

Moravia Jr. Sr. High School is located at 68 South Main Street and serves grades 7 through 12. The current principal is Jeff Green.

=== History ===
==== Selected former principals ====
- Maria Fragnoli-Ryan
- Brian Morgan–2000-2007
- Greg Jenne
- Brian Ford
- Karl O'Leary
- Bruce MacBain

== Millard Fillmore Elementary School ==
Millard Fillmore Elementary

Information
- Type: Public, Coeducational
- Principal: Carrie Love
- Grades: UPK-6
- Website: Millard Fillmore Elementary

Millard Fillmore Elementary is located at 24 South Main Street and serves grades UPK through 6. The current principal is Carrie Love.
