= Daryl Jones (baseball) =

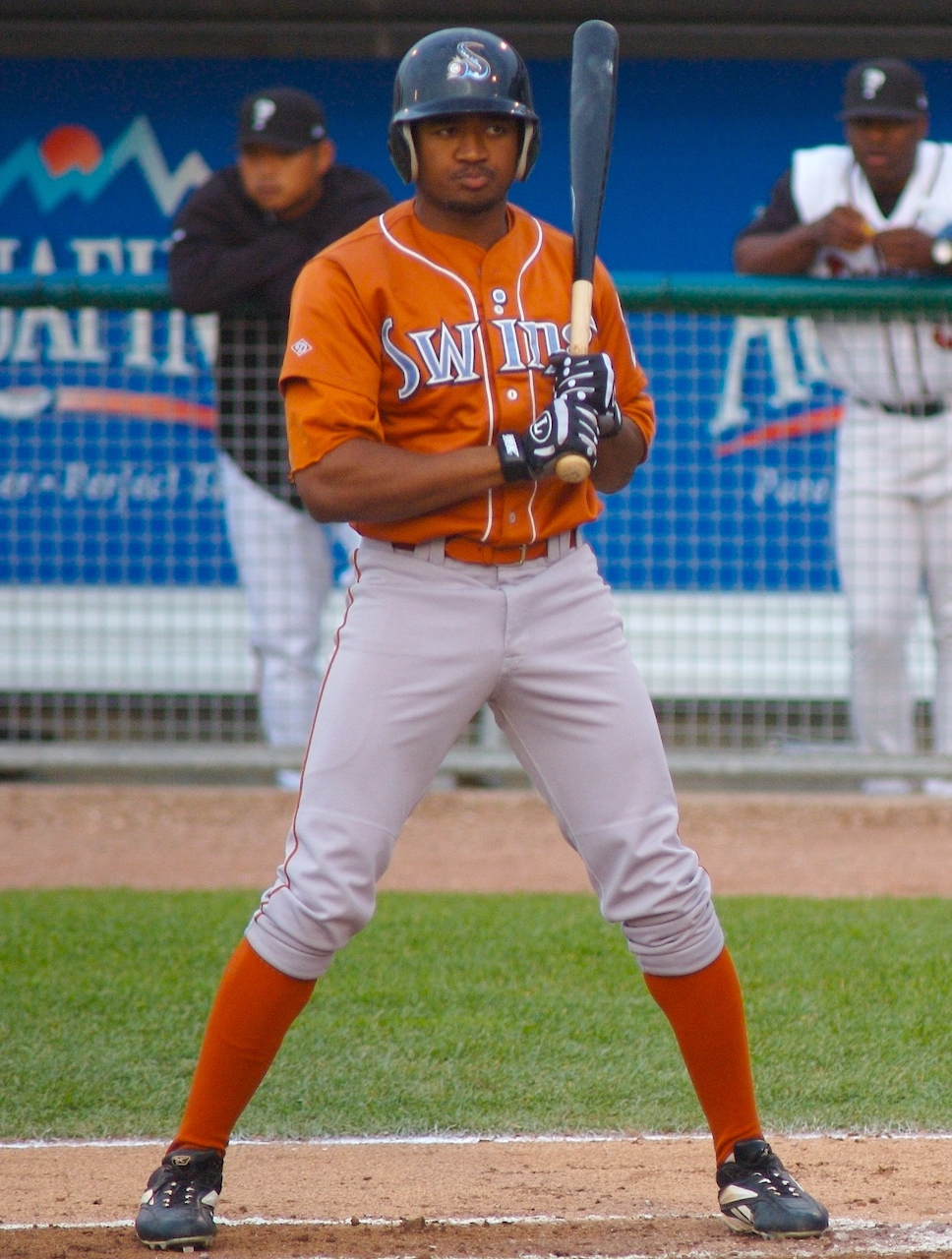
- Jones with the Swing of the Quad Cities in 2007
- Outfielder
- Born: June 25, 1987 (age 39); Royal Oak, Michigan, U.S.
- Bats: Left Throws: Left
- Stats at Baseball Reference

Daryl Jones (born June 25, 1987) is an American former professional baseball outfielder.

== Career ==
Jones attended Spring High School in Spring, Texas, where he was a football prospect as well as a baseball prospect. Jones was rated as one of the top position prospects at the 2005 Pre-Draft Showcase, where he also showed off his pitching ability.

=== St. Louis Cardinals ===
Jones was drafted by the St. Louis Cardinals in the third round (110th overall) of the 2005 Major League Baseball draft. He turned down a scholarship offer with Rice University to sign with the Cardinals for a $450,000 bonus. After struggling in Single–A with the Swing of the Quad Cities in 2006 and 2007, Jones hit .326 in 2008 and was named the Cardinals' minor league player of the year while playing with the High–A Palm Beach Cardinals. In 2009, he was named the Cardinals seventh best prospect, and was chosen to represent the Cardinals in the All-Star Futures Game. However, he played in the Futures game while not fully recovered from a quad injury and re-injured himself in the game, setting back his career prospects.

On November 18, 2009, the Cardinals added Jones to their 40-man roster in order to protect him from the Rule 5 draft. In 121 games for the Double–A Springfield Cardinals in 2010, he slashed .244/.335/.361 with eight home runs, 48 RBI, and 15 stolen bases. On November 19, 2010, Jones was removed from the 40–man roster and sent outright to the Triple–A Memphis Redbirds. In 2011, he played in 100 games for Springfield and Memphis, hitting a combined .260/.360/.400 with seven home runs and 35 RBI.

=== Cincinnati Reds ===
On November 7, 2011, Jones became a free agent and signed with the Cincinnati Reds, receiving an invitation to spring training. In 27 games with the Triple–A Louisville Bats, he hit only .187 and he was released on July 5.
