= Pigeon Forge High School =

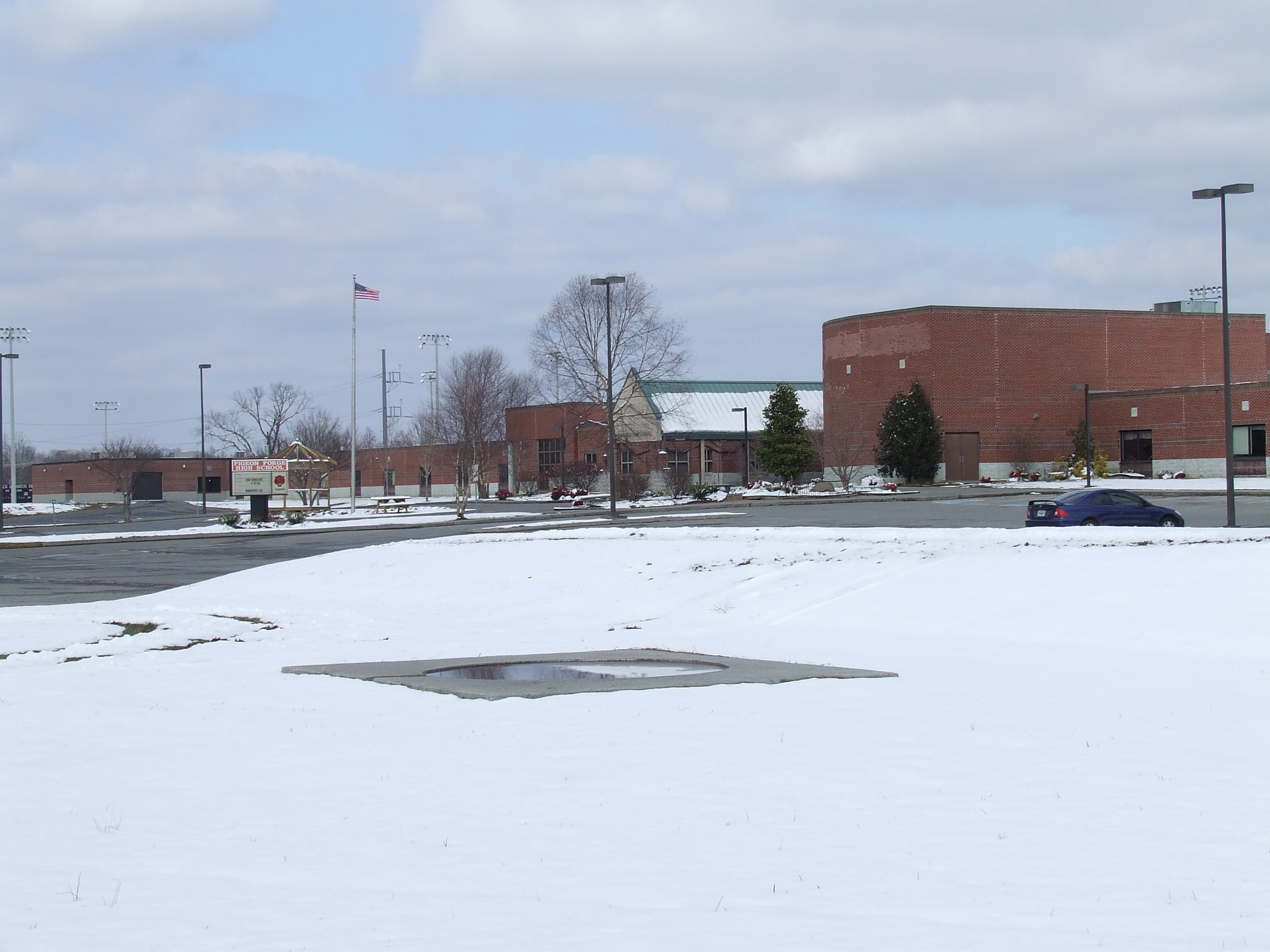
- Pigeon Forge High School during winter, 2006

Location
- 414 Tiger Drive; Pigeon Forge, Tennessee 37863; United States; 35°48′17″N 83°35′13″W

Information
- Type: Public secondary
- Motto: Forging Tomorrow's Leaders Today
- Superintendent: Stephanie Huskey
- Principal: Billy Wilson
- Staff: 41.67 (FTE)
- Grades: 10–12
- Gender: Coeducational
- Enrollment: 455 (2023-2024)
  - Grade 10: 169
  - Grade 11: 139
  - Grade 12: 147
- Student to teacher ratio: 10.92∶1
- Color
- Team name: Tigers
- Budget: US$8,039,697
- Website: www.pfh.sevier.org

Pigeon Forge High School is a public, coeducational high school located in Sevier County, Tennessee. Part of the Sevier County Board of Education, the school is administrated by a Director of Schools (Stephanie Huskey) who oversees the school's Principal (Benjamin Clabo) who conducts school operations. As of 2021, the school had a total student body of 442 pupils across grades 10 through 12.

== Campus & structure ==
Pigeon Forge High School is located at 414 Tiger Drive, near the Parkway that serves as the main transportation artery of the city of Pigeon Forge. The high school was established in 1999 in a building that had previously been the Pigeon Forge Middle School. Beginning with only the seventh, eighth, and ninth grades, Pigeon Forge High School added one grade per year, graduating its first class in the 2002-2003 academic year.

Located on a campus of some 22 acres (8.9 ha), PFHS has added a number of athletic and scholastic facilities since its first year. Its proximity to facilities maintained by the city of Pigeon Forge, such as the city park and community center and library complex, make a variety of services available to students.

In August 2020, in compliance with a district-wide restructuring transition to an intermediate school system, PFHS discontinued the enrollment of students in the ninth grade, converting from a 4-year to a 3-year high school.

== Demographics ==
For the 2020–21 academic year, Pigeon Forge High School enrolled 442 students, according to the National Center for Education Statistics. The school employed 45.17 full-time equivalent educators, resulting in a student to teacher ratio of 9.8:1.

Enrollment by race and ethnicity (2020–21)
Race and ethnicity^{†}	Enrolled pupils	Percentage
African American	5	1.13%
Asian	19	4.3%
Hispanic	93	21.04%
Native American	2	0.45%
White	315	71.27%
Native Hawaiian, Pacific islander	1	0.23%
Multi-race	7	1.58%
Total	442	100%
^{†} "Hispanic" includes Hispanics of any race. All other categories refer to non-Hispanics.

Enrollment by gender (2020–21)
Gender	Enrolled pupils	Percentage
Female	211	47.74%
Male	231	52.26%
Non-binary	0	0%
Total	442	100%

== Finance and budget ==
In the year 2020, total expenditures at Pigeon Forge High School totaled $8,039,697. Considering a total enrollment of 442 students in that year, the expenditures per student were $18,189.35.

== Curriculum & extracurricular activities ==
A three-tier system of tracking is in place to allow learning in the skills, standard, and honors venues in order to best meet the needs of students at varying ability levels. To supplement all these offerings, the student body is also able to participate in a variety of extracurricular sports ranging from wrestling to biking and an array of intellectual pursuits, including a Beta Club and others.
