= Baseball America High School Player of the Year Award =

The Baseball America High School Player of the Year Award has been awarded by Baseball America on an annual, national basis every year since 1992. The award has been won by many players who have gone on to have successful Major League Baseball careers.

== List of winners ==
| Year | Player name | Position | High School |
|---|---|---|---|
| 1992 | Preston Wilson | OF/RHP | Bamberg-Ehrhardt High School |
| 1993 | Trot Nixon | OF/LHP | New Hanover High School |
| 1994 | Doug Million | LHP | Sarasota High School |
| 1995 | Ben Davis | C | Malvern Preparatory School |
| 1996 | Matt White | RHP | Waynesboro Area High School |
| 1997 | Darnell McDonald | OF | Cherry Creek High School |
| 1998 | Drew Henson | 3B/RHP | Brighton High School |
| 1999 | Josh Hamilton | OF/LHP | Athens Drive High School |
| 2000 | Matt Harrington | SS | Palmdale High School |
| 2001 | Joe Mauer | C | Cretin-Derham Hall High School |
| 2002 | Scott Kazmir | LHP | Cypress Falls High School |
| 2003 | Jeff Allison | RHP | Peabody Veterans Memorial High School |
| 2004 | Homer Bailey | RHP | La Grange High School |
| 2005 | Justin Upton | SS | Great Bridge High School |
| 2006 | Adrian Cárdenas | SS/2B | Monsignor Edward Pace High School |
| 2007 | Mike Moustakas | SS | Chatsworth High School |
| 2008 | Ethan Martin | RHP/3B | Stephens County High School |
| 2009 | Bryce Harper | C | Las Vegas High School |
| 2010 | Kaleb Cowart | 3B/RHP | Cook County High School |
| 2011 | Dylan Bundy | RHP | Owasso High School |
| 2012 | Byron Buxton | OF | Appling County High School |
| 2013 | Clint Frazier | OF | Loganville High School |
| 2014 | Alex Jackson | C | Rancho Bernardo High School |
| 2015 | Kyle Tucker | OF | Plant High School |
| 2016 | Mickey Moniak | OF | La Costa Canyon High School |
| 2017 | MacKenzie Gore | LHP | Whiteville High School |
| 2018 | Cole Winn | RHP | Orange Lutheran High School |
| 2019 | Bobby Witt Jr. | RHP | Colleyville Heritage High School |
| 2020 | Not awarded due to COVID-19 pandemic | | |
| 2021 | Jackson Jobe | SS | Heritage Hall School |
| 2022 | Jackson Holliday | SS | Stillwater High School |
| 2023 | Max Clark | CF | Franklin Community High School |
| 2024 | Konnor Griffin | | Jackson Preparatory School |
| 2025 | Ethan Holliday | 3B | Stillwater High School |
| 2026 | Grady Emerson | SS | Fort Worth Christian School |

== See also ==
- Baseball America #High-school baseball awards (additional awards)
- American Baseball Coaches Association (ABCA) High School Player of the Year
- Gatorade High School Baseball Player of the Year
- USA Today High School Baseball Player of the Year
- Baseball awards#U.S. high-school baseball
- The National Classic
