= Jerry DeLucca =

American football player (born 1936)

No. 53, 74, 72, 70
- Positions: Offensive tackle, defensive tackle

Personal information
- Born: July 17, 1936; Peabody, Massachusetts, U.S.
- Died: January 8, 2017 (aged 80); Danvers, Massachusetts, U.S.
- Listed height: 6 ft 2 in (1.88 m)
- Listed weight: 247 lb (112 kg)

Career information
- High school: Peabody Veterans Memorial
- College: Tennessee (1953–1955); Middle Tennessee State (1956)
- NFL draft: 1957: 7th round, 84th overall pick

Career history
- Toronto Argonauts (1958); Chicago Bears (1959)*; Philadelphia Eagles (1959); Dallas Cowboys (1960)*; Boston Patriots (1960–1961); Buffalo Bills (1962–1963); Dallas Texans (1963)*; Boston Patriots (1963–1964)
- * Offseason or practice squad member only

Awards and highlights
- Second-team All-AFL (1961); Second-team sophomore All-SEC (1954)

Career NFL/AFL statistics
- Games played: 59
- Games started: 37
- Stats at Pro Football Reference

Gerald Joseph DeLucca (July 17, 1936 – January 8, 2017) was an American professional football offensive lineman in the National Football League (NFL) for the Philadelphia Eagles. He also played in the American Football League (AFL) for the Boston Patriots and Buffalo Bills. He played college football at Middle Tennessee State University.

== Early life ==
Delucca attended Peabody Veterans Memorial High School, before moving on to University of Tennessee, where he was named to the second-team sophomore All-SEC team. He later transferred to Middle Tennessee State University.

== Professional career ==
=== Chicago Bears ===
DeLucca was selected by the Chicago Bears in the seventh round (84th overall) of the 1957 NFL draft. He spent from 1957 to 1958 serving his military service. On September 23, 1959, he was traded to the Philadelphia Eagles.

=== Philadelphia Eagles ===
In 1959, he was a starter at left tackle for the Philadelphia Eagles.

=== Dallas Cowboys ===
DeLucca was selected by the Dallas Cowboys in the 1960 NFL expansion draft and was released before the start of the season.

=== Boston Patriots (first stint) ===
On September 23, 1960, he was signed as a free agent by the Boston Patriots of the American Football League and became a part of their inaugural season. He was a two-year starter at right tackle, before being traded to the Buffalo Bills in exchange for a draft choice on September 4, 1962.

=== Buffalo Bills ===
DeLucca played for Buffalo Bills in all 14 games of the 1962 season. On April 11, 1963, he was traded to the Dallas Texans in exchange for a draft choice.

=== Boston Patriots (second stint) ===
On April 23, 1963, he was re-acquired by the Boston Patriots in exchange for a draft choice, to provide depth after tackle Milt Graham was lost to injury. He was released on November 7, to make room for a healthy Graham. DeLucca was cut early on the 1964 season, but was re-signed on November 27, to provide depth because of injuries.
