= Kelley Lynch =

American softball player

- Pitcher / First baseman
- Born: October 5, 2000 (age 26); Newnan, Georgia, U.S.
- Bats: Right Throws: Right

Teams
- Washington (2020–2023); LSU (2024)

Career highlights and awards
- Gatorade National Softball Player of the Year (2018–2019); Gatorade Georgia Female Athlete of the Year (2018–2019); No. 1 recruit in the Class of 2019; WBSC U-19 Women's Softball World Cup Gold Medalist (USA) (2019); Two-time Georgia Class 7A State Champion (East Coweta) (2017, 2018); NFCA All-Pacific Region Third Team (Washington) (2023); Pac-12 All-Freshman Team (2023); All-SEC Second Team (LSU) (2024); NFCA South All-Region Third Team (LSU) (2024); Three career no-hitters (twice with Washington, once with LSU)

Kelley Lynch (born October 5, 2000) is an American softball player who competed collegiately and professionally as a two-way pitcher and first baseman. A native of Newnan, Georgia, Lynch is widely regarded as one of the most decorated prep softball players in U.S. history, having been named the 2018–19 Gatorade National Softball Player of the Year and ranked the No. 1 recruit in the Class of 2019. She played four years at the University of Washington before transferring to Louisiana State University (LSU) for her graduate season in 2024, and subsequently played professional softball in the Women's Professional Fastpitch (WPF) league.

== Early life and high school career ==
Lynch grew up in Newnan, Georgia, and attended East Coweta High School in Sharpsburg, where she played for head coach Franklin DeLoach. She was a two-way player from early in her career, excelling both as a pitcher, shortstop, and later first baseman.

In 2017, East Coweta won the AAAAAAA State Championship with an unprecedented 36–0 record. The following season, East Coweta went 32–2 and again claimed the state's highest classification title, making them back-to-back state champions. She was subsequently named an Extra Inning Softball First Team All-American.

Lynch's father, Steve Lynch, was a longtime softball coach and mentor whose influence extended throughout the Atlanta travel ball community. He passed away before Kelley's high school career concluded, and she has spoken openly about playing in his memory.

== Awards and recognition (high school) ==
Lynch was the first softball player to win the Gatorade Female Athlete of the Year award in the program's history. She was named Player of the Year by both the Georgia Athletic Coaches Association and the Georgia Dugout Club, and was ranked as the nation's No. 1 recruit in the Class of 2019 by Softball America.

Lynch was presented with the 2018–19 Gatorade National Softball Player of the Year award at her school by two-time Olympic softball pitcher Jennie Finch.

== International career ==
Lynch represented the United States as a member of the USA Softball U-19 Women's National Team. She was a 2019 WBSC U-19 Women's Softball World Cup Gold Medalist, hitting .333 (5-for-15) with 3 RBI and 4 runs scored, and earned a bronze medal at the 2019 USA Softball International Cup.

== Collegiate career ==
=== University of Washington (2020–2023) ===
Lynch enrolled at the University of Washington as the nation's top-ranked recruit in 2019 and subsequently joined the Huskies program. In 2021, she was named to the All-Pac-12 Freshman team, batting .271 with six home runs and 32 RBIs.

In her final season at Washington in 2023, Lynch started in 40 of 52 games, going 9–3 with a pair of saves, three shutouts, and 101 strikeouts with a 2.43 ERA over 77.2 innings. She was named to the All-Pacific Region Third Team and held opposing batters to a .178 batting average.

Lynch aided Washington to its 15th Women's College World Series appearance in 2023.

Over her four-year Washington career spanning 184 games, Lynch compiled a .268 batting average with 20 home runs and 96 RBI, along with a 25–14 pitching record, 308 strikeouts, and an opponents' batting average of .199.

=== Louisiana State University (2024) ===
Lynch transferred to LSU as a graduate student for the 2024 season, pursuing a master's degree in sports management while using her final year of eligibility.

In the circle during the 2024 season, Lynch made 18 starts and appeared in 21 games, going 9–3 with a 2.70 ERA, 95 strikeouts in 103.2 innings, and held opposing batters to a .189 average — ranking No. 10 in the SEC. She led the team with six complete game shutouts.

On April 13, 2024, Lynch tossed her first career seven-inning no-hitter as No. 6 LSU blanked Auburn 2–0 at Tiger Park, striking out nine batters. LSU Athletics It was the program's 46th no-hitter in LSU history.

Lynch earned a spot on the 2024 All-SEC Second Team as a utility pitcher. She was also named to the NFCA South All-Region Third Team.

== Professional career ==
Following the conclusion of her time collegiately, Lynch played professional softball for the Women's Professional Fastpitch (WPF) league, pitching for the Coastal Bend Tidal Wave of Corpus Christi, Texas, from June to September 2024.

== Personal life ==
Lynch is the daughter of Jan Lynch and the late Steve Lynch. Her sister, Katey, played softball at Kennesaw State University. Lynch graduated from the University of Washington in spring 2023 with a bachelor's degree in communication, with minors in real estate and business, before completing her master's degree in sports management at LSU in 2024.

== Career highlights ==
- 2018–19 Gatorade National Softball Player of the Year
- 2018–19 Gatorade Georgia Female Athlete of the Year
- No. 1 recruit in the Class of 2019
- 2019 WBSC U-19 Women's Softball World Cup Gold Medalist (USA)
- Two-time Georgia Class 7A State Champion (East Coweta, 2017 & 2018)
- 2023 NFCA All-Pacific Region Third Team (Washington)
- 2023 Pac-12 All-Freshman Team
- 2024 All-SEC Second Team (LSU)
- 2024 NFCA South All-Region Third Team (LSU)
- Three career no-hitters: vs. Bethune-Cookman (Washington, 2023), combined vs. Oregon State (Washington, 2023), and vs. Auburn (LSU, April 13, 2024)
