= Kyle Tucker =

American baseball player (born 1997)

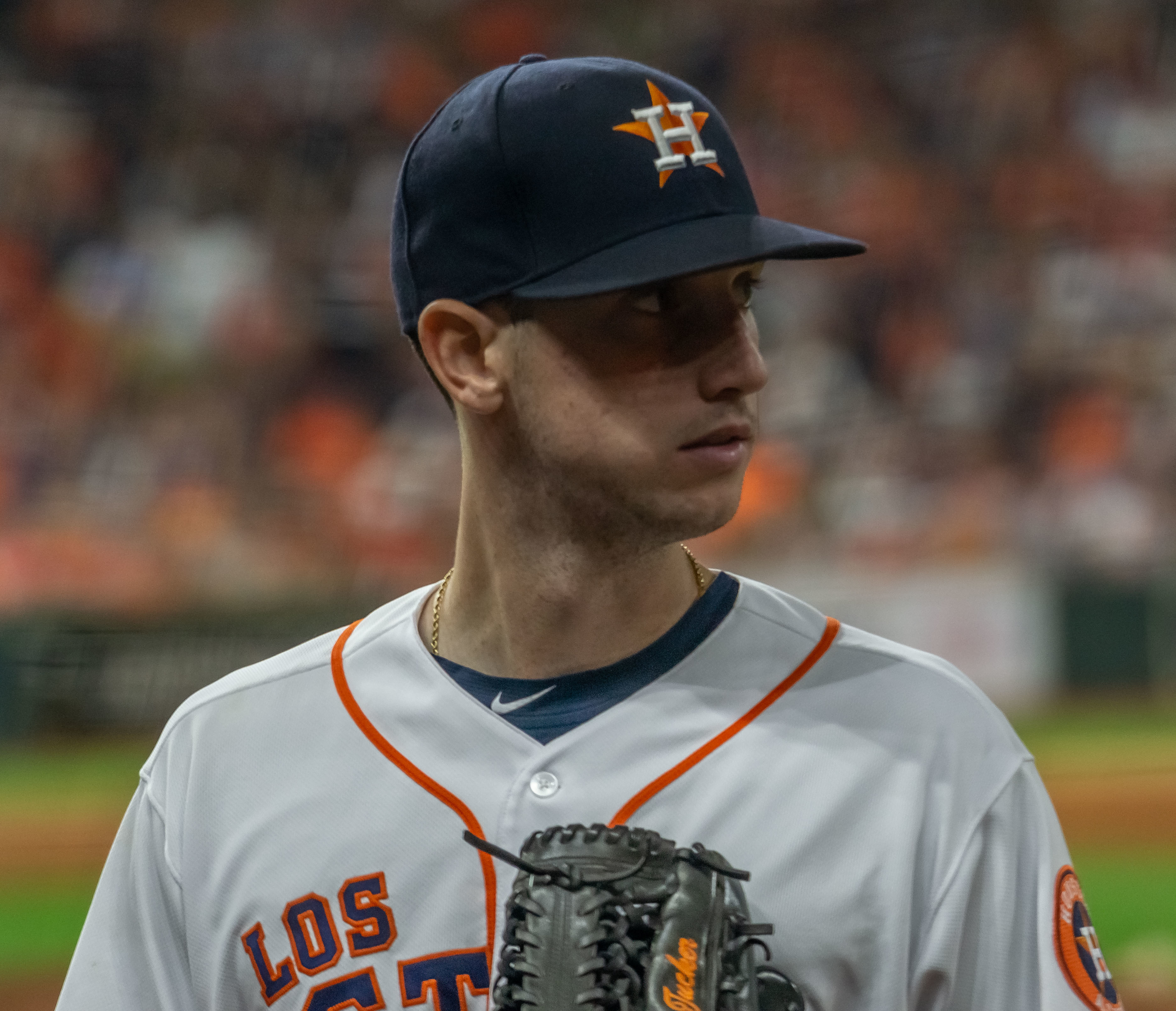
- Tucker with the Houston Astros in 2019

Los Angeles Dodgers – No. 23
- Right fielder
- Born: January 17, 1997 (age 29); Tampa, Florida, U.S.
- Bats: Left Throws: Right

MLB debut
- July 7, 2018, for the Houston Astros

MLB statistics (through 2026 season)
- Batting average: .266
- Home runs: 164
- Runs batted in: 560
- Stats at Baseball Reference

Teams
- Houston Astros (2018–2024); Chicago Cubs (2025); Los Angeles Dodgers (2026–present)

Career highlights and awards
- 4× All-Star (2022–2025); World Series champion (2022); Gold Glove Award (2022); 2× Silver Slugger Award (2023, 2025); AL RBI leader (2023)
Medals
Men's baseball
Representing United States
World Baseball Classic
Silver medal – second place	2023 Miami	Team

Kyle Daniel Tucker (born January 17, 1997), nicknamed "King Tuck", is an American professional baseball right fielder for the Los Angeles Dodgers of Major League Baseball (MLB). He has previously played in MLB for the Houston Astros and Chicago Cubs. Internationally, Tucker represents the United States.

A native of Tampa, Florida, Tucker won Florida's Gatorade Player of the Year Award while attending and playing for Henry B. Plant High School. Tucker was selected by the Astros with the fifth pick in the first round of the 2015 MLB draft, and he made his MLB debut with them in 2018. In 2021, he was selected to the All-MLB Team for the first time. The following year, he earned his first World Series championship, MLB All-Star selection, and Gold Glove Award. In 2023, Tucker was the AL run batted in leader and won his first Silver Slugger Award. Since 2021, Tucker has made the All-Star Game four times.

== High school career ==
Tucker attended Henry B. Plant High School in Tampa, Florida, and played for their baseball team. He set a school record with 31 home runs in his high school career.

Tucker appeared in Perfect Game's All American Classic. Tucker was named Florida's Gatorade Player of the Year in 2015. He also won the Baseball America High School Player of the Year Award. Tucker committed to attend the University of Florida to play college baseball for the Florida Gators.

== Professional career ==
=== Houston Astros ===
==== Minor leagues (2015–18) ====
Projected to be a first-round pick in the 2015 MLB draft, the Houston Astros selected Tucker fifth overall. He signed with the Astros, receiving a $4 million signing bonus rather than attend college.

Tucker played for the Greeneville Astros of the rookie-level Appalachian League. He began the 2016 season with the Quad Cities River Bandits of the Single–A Midwest League, and received a midseason promotion to the Lancaster JetHawks of the High–A California League. Tucker hit .285/.360/.438 with 32 stolen bases, nine home runs, and 69 runs batted in (RBIs) in 2016.

Tucker began the 2017 season with the Buies Creek Astros of the High–A Carolina League and was promoted to the Corpus Christi Hooks of the Double–A Texas League in May. He appeared in the 2017 All-Star Futures Game. He finished the season batting a combined .274/.346/.528 with 25 home runs and 90 RBIs between Buies Creek and Corpus Christi. After the season, the Astros assigned Tucker to the Mesa Solar Sox of the Arizona Fall League.

Tucker began the 2018 season with the Fresno Grizzlies of the Triple–A Pacific Coast League. After he batted .306 in 80 games, the Astros promoted him to the major leagues on July 7.

==== Early major league career (2018–20) ====
Tucker made his major-league debut on July 7, 2018, versus the Chicago White Sox. He collected his first major-league hit and RBI that day. He batted .141/.236/.203 in 72 plate appearances for the Astros in 2018.

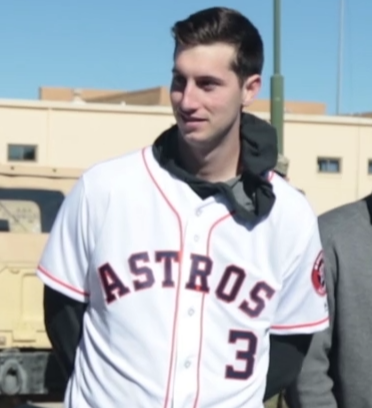
Tucker at Fort Hood in 2019

Tucker spent the 2019 minor league season with the Round Rock Express, hitting .266/.350/.555/.905 with 34 home runs, 97 RBIs, and 30 stolen bases. Tucker was promoted to the Astros on September 2, 2019. In 2019 with the Astros, he batted .269/.319/.537 with four home runs and 11 RBIs in 67 at bats, while stealing five bases without being caught.

In 2020, playing in 58 of the abbreviated sixty-game season, Tucker batted .268/.325/.512 with six triples (leading the American League), nine home runs, and 42 RBIs in 209 at bats, and stole eight bases while being caught just once. He also placed sixth in the league in RBIs, sixth in extra-base hits (27), and seventh in stolen bases. He played in 13 playoff games, batting .306/.327/.367 before a season-ending loss to the Tampa Bay Rays in the American League Championship Series (ALCS).

==== All-MLB Second Team (2021) ====
Tucker authored a breakout season in 2021. From May 1 through the end of the season, he batted .320 and led the AL in on-base percentage, slugging and OPS. On October 3, Tucker became the third Astro to have hit 30 home runs in one season before turning age 25. In September and October, he batted .346 with eight home runs, 20 runs scored, 19 RBIs, a .438 on-base percentage, and a .692 slugging percentage for a 1.130 OPS. He was awarded the AL Player of the Month for September, his first career monthly award.

In his first full, unshortened, major-league season, Tucker reached career-highs in nearly every offensive category, batting .294/.359./.557/.917, with 37 doubles, 30 home runs, 92 RBIs, 14 stolen bases, 282 total bases, and 147 OPS+ in 140 games played. He ranked ninth in the AL in batting, third in slugging percentage and OPS, fifth in doubles and OPS+, and 10th in Wins Above Replacement (5.7 WAR, per Baseball-Reference). He was a Gold Glove finalist in right field with +11 Defensive Runs Saved (DRS), tied with Joey Gallo and Aaron Judge for second place behind Adolis García. Tucker was announced as a finalist for the Silver Slugger Award for outfielders on October 25, 2021; the three outfielder winners were Teoscar Hernández, Judge, and Cedric Mullins Tucker received his first selection as a Sporting News AL All-Star at outfield, and to the All-MLB Second Team.

In Game 4 of the 2021 American League Division Series (ALDS) against the Chicago White Sox on October 12, Tucker stole second and third base in the fourth inning to become the first Astro to steal two bases in the same inning of a postseason game. He slashed .279/.333/.541 in 61 postseason at bats, stole five bases, hit four home runs, and led both leagues in postseason RBIs with 15.

==== 2022 ====
An early-season slump for Tucker in 2022 included a 4-for-46 span to start the season. On April 27, his three-run double in the fifth inning versus the Texas Rangers scored the decisive runs for a 4–3 Astros win; he collected seven RBIs in the first three games of that series. Pinch hitting in the eighth inning of the next game, his home run again provided the margin of victory for the Astros, 3–2, after Rangers starter Martín Pérez had taken a perfect game into the seventh inning.

At Fenway Park on May 17, Tucker tied his career high of six RBIs, including hitting one of five home runs in the second inning versus Nathan Eovaldi of the Boston Red Sox, tying the major league record for a team in one inning. In the fourth inning, he added a grand slam. While playing the Chicago White Sox on June 17, 2022, Tucker extended a career-high hitting streak to 15 games.

Tucker was named a reserve outfielder to the MLB All-Star Game at Dodger Stadium, his first career selection. Some totals at the time included a .259 average, 16 home runs, fourth place ranking in the AL in RBIs (58), and tied for fifth in steals (14). He garnered 10 Defensive Runs Saved, per Fangraphs, tied with Brett Phillips for the lead among AL outfielders. During the season, he became the seventh player in MLB history to steal 40 bases and hit 60 home runs in his first 350 games, doing so in his 329th game in the majors.

Tucker's second grand slam of the season on August 12 catalyzed a 7–5 Astros win versus the Oakland Athletics. On August 18, he tied a career high with four hits versus the White Sox in a 21–5 win that included 25 hits, tied for both the second-highest scoring output and most hits in team history. A double in the third inning versus the Minnesota Twins on August 24 extended a hitting streak to a new career-high 16 games for Tucker. The hitting streak extended to 17 games and ended on August 27. Tucker reached 20 stolen base on September 3, giving him his first 20/20 (20-home run, 20-stolen base) campaign. On September 20, Tucker, facing his hometown Rays, drove in his 100th run of the season to become the 18th player in club history to accomplish the feat, and first full-time Astros outfielder since Carlos Lee in 2009. The following day, Tucker hit the go-ahead home run the eighth inning that resulted in a 5–2 win, finishing off a series sweep at Tropicana Field, the first ever for Houston in Tampa Bay. He hit his 30th home run of the season on October 4 versus the Philadelphia Phillies, joining Jeff Bagwell as the only players in Astros history to have reached 30 home runs, 100 RBIs, and 25 stolen bases in the same season.

In 2022, he batted .257/.330/.478 in 544 at bats. He swung at a higher percentage of pitches in the strike zone (84.0%) than any other major league batter. He played 147 games in right field, and three at DH. He received nomination for the AL Silver Slugger Award in right field/

In Game 1 of the 2022 World Series, Tucker hit consecutive home runs versus Aaron Nola, becoming the first Astros player with multiple home runs in a World Series game. Although they would lose that game 6-5, the Astros defeated the Phillies in six games to give Tucker his first World Series title, with Tucker catching a fly ball hit by Nick Castellanos to record the final out.

Through his 13 defensive runs saved, Tucker was awarded the AL 2022 Gold Glove Award for his play in right field. He was also second in the league at his position in assists (8). Tucker became the third Astro, following Michael Bourn (2009-10) and César Cedeño (1972-76) to win a Gold Glove as an outfielder, and first since 2010. Overall in the regular season he hit to a 128 OPS+ and 5.2 baseball-reference WAR.

==== 2023 ====
On September 10, 2023, Tucker became the third player in AL history to triple twice during the same inning, and the eighth major leaguer since 1900. His feat occurred during an eight-run sixth inning against the San Diego Padres, first off Tim Hill and the second off Rich Hill. Tucker's aggregate season totals included batting .284, hitting 29 home runs and driving in 112 runs (highest in the American League) over 574 at-bats. Tucker also stole 30 bases and his on-base plus slugging (OPS) was .886, the 11th highest in the American League. He was named the Astros' nominee for the Heart & Hustle Award.

==== 2024 ====
During the 2024 season, Tucker started with a .979 OPS and 19 home runs in 60 games. A right shin injury sustained on June 3 after the impact of two batted balls kept him out of action until after the All-Star break, during which he earned his third career All-Star selection. Tucker was transferred to the 60–day injured list on July 30. After missing 79 games, he was activated on September 6.

Tucker was announced on September 11 as the Astros' nominee for the 2024 Roberto Clemente Award, whose foundation assists those in hospice care and children with cancer diagnoses.

From September 20–21, 2024, Tucker produced consecutive four-hit games, the 14th Astro to accomplish the feat, and first since former teammate Michael Brantley on July 5–7, 2019. Tucker finished the season with 78 games played, a .289/.408/.585 batting line, 23 home runs, 49 RBI, 56 runs scored, 11 stolen bases without being caught, 56 walks, and 54 strikeouts. His slash line and OPS+ (181) both represented career bests, though he did not accrue enough plate appearances to qualify for the batting title (339).

=== Chicago Cubs (2025) ===
On December 13, 2024, Tucker was traded to the Chicago Cubs for Isaac Paredes, Hayden Wesneski, and prospect Cam Smith. He made his Cubs debut in Game 1 of the Tokyo Series, where he went 0–4. In Game 2 of the Tokyo Series, he collected his first hit as a Cub with a double off Alex Vesia onto the left-field wall in the bottom of the ninth inning versus the Los Angeles Dodgers. On March 29, 2025, he hit his first home run as a Cub off Brandon Pfaadt when he hit a two-run homer in the top of the fifth inning in a 4–3 win over the Arizona Diamondbacks. Tucker then hit three more home runs in three straight games, making a career-high milestone for his career by hitting a home run in four consecutive games.

He was named National League (NL) Player of the Week on April 7 following a 9-for-23 performance, three home runs, and eight RBIs over the prior six contests, his first weekly honor in the major leagues. Tucker hit his 10th home run of the 2025 season, a 384-foot blast off Clay Holmes, in a Cubs loss against the New York Mets on May 9, 2025. Tucker was elected as the National League's starting right fielder on July 2 for the All-Star Game. He was placed on the 10-day injured list on September 6 due to a Left calf strain. He was activated from the IL on September 26. In 136 appearances for Chicago, Tucker batted .266/.377/.464 with 22 home runs, 73 RBI, and 25 stolen bases.

=== Los Angeles Dodgers ===
On January 21, 2026, Tucker signed a four year, $240 million contract with the Los Angeles Dodgers. The deal included opt outs after the second and third years, a $64 million signing bonus, and $30 million of deferred money. In 154 games for the Dodgers he batted .233 with 17 home runs and 70 RBI, his lowest totals since his first couple of seasons.

== International career ==
On August 27, 2022, Tucker committed to play for the United States in the 2023 World Baseball Classic.

== Personal life ==
Tucker's older brother, Preston, is also a professional baseball outfielder who was drafted by and played for the Astros, appearing with the major league club in 2015 and 2016. Kyle, a natural right-hander, started batting left-handed as a result of mimicking his older brother, who is naturally left-handed. Preston held the Plant High School home run record with 29 until Kyle surpassed him and finished with 31.

On December 23, 2022, Tucker announced via Instagram his engagement to girlfriend Samantha Scott. They both graduated from Plant High School in 2015 and began dating in 2017 while Scott was attending Florida State University. Tucker announced via Instagram that he and Samantha got married on January 13, 2024.

=== The Kyle Tucker Foundation ===
In early 2022, Tucker initiated his eponymous foundation to increase awareness for non-profit hospice care centers. He opened it as a response to the death of his grandfather in 2021 during hospice care. The foundation officially recognizes hospice centers, the efforts of staff members, partners with local businesses to raise awareness, and aids families of those undergoing hospice care in both Tampa and Houston. Tucker announced via Instagram in July 2025, that he is opening a branch of his foundation in Chicago.

== Awards ==
Awards won by Kyle Tucker
Award	Category	Result / Section	Year	Ref.
All-Star Futures Game selectee			2017	
Baseball America	High School Player of the Year		2015	
Heart & Hustle		Nominated	2023	
Sporting News	American League All-Star	Outfield	2021	

== See also ==
- Chicago Cubs award winners and league leaders
- Houston Astros award winners and league leaders
- List of highest-paid Major League Baseball players
- List of Major League Baseball annual runs batted in leaders
- List of Major League Baseball annual triples leaders
- List of Major League Baseball career slugging percentage leaders
- List of people from Tampa, Florida

Awards and achievements
Preceded by José Abreu	American League Player of the Month; September 2021	Succeeded by José Ramírez
