= Jeff Allison =

American baseball player (born 1984)

- Starting pitcher
- Born: November 7, 1984 (age 41); Lynn, Massachusetts, U.S.
- Bats: Right Throws: Right
- Stats at Baseball Reference

Career highlights and awards
- Baseball America High School Player of the Year Award (2003)
Medals
Men's baseball
Representing United States
World Junior Baseball Championship
Bronze medal – third place	2002 Sherbrooke	Team

Jeffrey M. Allison (born November 7, 1984) is an American former professional baseball pitcher.

== High school career ==
Allison played high school baseball at Peabody Veterans Memorial High School in Peabody, Massachusetts. In his senior year, Allison was named the 2003 Massachusetts Gatorade High School Baseball Player of the Year and was also named the 2003 Baseball America High School Player of the Year, becoming the first player from Massachusetts to win the honor. In that season, Allison tossed 63 2/3 innings without allowing an earned run. He was 9–0 with 142 strikeouts and nine walks, surrendering just 13 hits and one unearned run. He also batted .441 with two home runs and 29 runs batted in. Allison was selected in the first round (16th overall) of the 2003 MLB draft by the Florida Marlins and signed with them 2 months later. The Marlins paid Allison a reported $1.85 million signing bonus.

== Professional career ==
After signing with the Marlins in 2003, the team did not want to strain Allison's arm after a fairly long high school season and he only appeared in 3 games with the Gulf Coast Marlins of the Gulf Coast League for rookies. Allison went 0–2 with an earned run average (ERA) of 1.00 in 9 innings pitched.

Allison missed the entire season in 2004 as the Florida Marlins placed him on their restricted list. Allison was rumored to have entered a substance abuse treatment program and was forced to forfeit a portion of his signing bonus money.

In 2005, the Marlins began to ease Allison back into professional baseball. They placed him with the Single-A Greensboro Grasshoppers and he started 17 games going 5–4 with a 4.18 ERA and 83 strikeouts in 94.2 innings pitched.

Allison's issues with substance abuse continued and he did not play professional baseball for 2 years.

Allison made a comeback in 2008 after being sober for fifteen months. He was assigned by the Marlins to the Single-A Jupiter Hammerheads and pitched in 26 games, going 9–8 with a 5.22 ERA and 69 strikeouts in 120.2 innings pitched. He was also named to the mid-season Florida State League All-Star Team.

In 2009, Allison was assigned again to the Single-A Hammerheads. In June, he was named as a mid-season All-Star for the second year in a row. He finished the season with a 7–9 record with the Hammerheads and a 3.68 ERA in 25 games pitched, leading the team and finishing second in the league with 3 complete games. Allison was briefly promoted to the Double-A Jacksonville Suns for a spot start on August 5, 2009, where he allowed one hit over 5 innings and earned the win.

Allison was promoted full-time to Double-A Jacksonville where he started the 2010 season as a reliever. After making a few spot starts he was promoted to a starting spot. He finished the season with a 6–11 record with a 5.04 ERA in 29 appearances, 20 of them starts. Allison built momentum through mid-season before struggling down the stretch going 0–4 in his last 4 starts.

Allison again spent the 2011 season with Double-A Jacksonville. He was used primarily as a relief pitcher, appearing in 30 games, 26 of them being in relief. Allison finished the season with a 3–4 record with a 6.26 ERA. Allison finished the season strong after a tough start in which his ERA was over 9.00. At the end of the 2011 season, Allison became a free agent.

In a February 2012 article by Peter Gammons, Allison was quoted as stating that he would most likely be retiring from professional baseball. Allison stated that he heard a pop in his elbow three years prior but ignored it, the injury would require surgery and an extended rehabilitation period.

== Personal struggles ==
Allison's personal struggles have been well documented, most specifically in a Boston Globe two-part special article that ran in 2004. After his rookie season in 2003, Allison became increasingly addicted to heroin and OxyContin. He spent the winter between 2003 and 2004 in rehabilitation facilities. Then in July 2004, while on the restricted list he suffered a heroin overdose that nearly took his life. After his 2005 season, he was again suspended by the Marlins for undisclosed reasons. On August 9, 2006, Allison again suffered a heroin overdose at an apartment in Medford, Massachusetts. In October 2006, in North Carolina he faced felony charges for possession of drug paraphernalia, possession of a stolen vehicle, possession of heroin and resisting a public officer. He was scheduled to appear in court in December but never showed up, and a warrant was issued for his arrest. On June 8, 2007, Allison was again arrested and charged with unauthorized use of a motor vehicle. This charge carried with it a potential violation of his probation from his arrest in North Carolina. He was sentenced to 75 days in jail due to the violation and three years probation.

== Similarities to Josh Hamilton ==
Many observers, including Allison himself, have pointed out similarities between Allison and MLB All-Star Josh Hamilton. Both Hamilton and Allison were Baseball America High School Players of the Year. Both battled intense drug addiction, Hamilton with cocaine and crack, Allison with heroin and oxycodone. Both had stints away from organized baseball. The two players also both stayed sober for considerable amounts of time and made comebacks. ESPN's Peter Gammons mentioned the similarities between the two players during his commentary at the 2008 MLB All Star Game. Hamilton has also followed Allison's struggles and has even made statements to the media that he would love to talk to Allison about his recovery and offer words of encouragement.

== Post-playing career ==
Starting in 2011, Allison worked as a pitching instructor and head coach at the Show Baseball Academy in Lawrence, Massachusetts. He joined Steve Lomasney as fellow coaches in the program. In 2015, Allison left the Show in order to join the North East Hurricanes and play ball in Salem, New Hampshire. He works as a pitching instructor and director of the program. In addition to coaching, Allison gives speeches to students and shares his experience and struggles in order to promote sobriety.
