= Matt Harrington (baseball) =

American baseball player (born 1982)

- Pitcher
- Born: February 1, 1982 (age 44); West Valley, California, U.S.
- Bats: Right Throws: Right
- Stats at Baseball Reference

Career highlights and awards
- Baseball America High School Player of the Year Award (2000)
Medals
Men's baseball
Representing United States
World Youth Baseball Championship
Gold medal – first place	1998 Fairview Heights	Team

Matt Harrington (born February 1, 1982) is an American baseball player. Harrington was selected in the Major League Baseball draft five times in consecutive years, without coming to an agreement with his selecting team on any of the five occasions – the only such baseball player to have been drafted so many times without signing a contract.

== Amateur career ==
Harrington attended Palmdale High School in Palmdale, California, where he played for the school's baseball team. In Harrington's senior season, he posted a 0.54 earned run average (ERA) and an 11–0 win–loss record, including one no-hitter, with 126 strikeouts in only 65 innings pitched. His starts received significant hype, leading Pete Rose and George Brett to attend his games.

Baseball America named Harrington their High School Player of the Year in 2000. USA Today also named him their high school Player of the Year that season, He was chosen to participate in the 1999 Goodwill Games. He was offered a full baseball scholarship to attend Arizona State University.

== Professional career ==
Harrington was regarded as one of the top talents available in the 2000 Major League Baseball draft, and he chose agent Tommy Tanzer as his representative. Several of the teams at the top of the draft were scared off by Tanzer's bonus demands for Harrington, and ultimately the Colorado Rockies selected Harrington with the seventh overall pick in the draft. However, Harrington and Tanzer were never able to come to terms on a contract with the Rockies. Tanzer asked for a $4.95 million signing bonus, which was 25 percent more than what the previous year's No. 1 pick Josh Hamilton had received. The negotiations proved acrimonious, with Tanzer accusing the Rockies of backing out of an alleged pre-draft agreement to sign for his stated asking price, and the Rockies denying that such an agreement ever took place. The Rockies' final offer was $4 million and a guaranteed major league callup by the end of 2002. Harrington turned down the deal, sat out the season and re-entered the draft in 2001.

In the 2001 MLB draft, Harrington slipped into the second round, being drafted by the San Diego Padres with the 58th overall pick. While Harrington and his parents initially retained Tanzer, they ultimately replaced him with Scott Boras a few months into negotiations. The Padres offered Harrington a $1.2 million signing bonus, but Boras, who wanted twice that amount, rejected the offer and Harrington again declined to sign. He played in the independent leagues during the following season, putting up unimpressive numbers for the St. Paul Saints of the Northern League and the Long Beach Breakers of the now-defunct Western Baseball League, going a combined 2–6 with a 6.75 ERA. He was released by Long Beach's manager Steve Yeager. Although the Padres were still free to make additional contract offers until the day of the 2002 draft, they chose not to after scouting Harrington in independent ball that May. They felt Harrington's skills had diminished, and notified him that they were not interested in signing him to a contract, and would not be drafting him again.

Despite his struggles in the independent leagues, Harrington was drafted again in 2002. This time, he was taken by the Tampa Bay Devil Rays in the 13th round (374th overall). Again, he failed to agree to a contract. Tampa Bay's offers ranged in the $5,000-$200,000 range, standard 13th round money.

From 2003 to 2006, Harrington pitched for the Fort Worth Cats of the independent American Association. In 2003, he fell to the 24th round of the draft (711th overall), before he was selected by the Cincinnati Reds, who were just offering little more than a chance to play. In 2004, he was drafted by the New York Yankees in the 36th round (1,089 overall). However, Harrington required surgery on his rotator cuff, and the Yankees did not offer him a contract as a result. No team selected Harrington in the 2005 MLB draft, making Harrington a free agent, able to sign with any MLB franchise.

For the 2005 and 2006 seasons, Harrington pitched in the Central League and American Association. He posted a 5–0 record during the 2005 season, and followed that up with a 6–1 record and a 2.90 ERA in 2006. During the 2006 season, he increased his strikeout rate dramatically, and allowed just 6.7 hits per nine innings pitched. The improvement was credited to Harrington being in better shape and regaining considerable velocity on his fastball.

Harrington's improvement caused some major league clubs to again have interest in signing him. On October 10, 2006, he signed a minor league contract with the Chicago Cubs. He received no signing bonus, but attended the Cubs' 2007 spring training camp with the hope of landing a position on a Cubs minor league affiliate. However, the Cubs released him on March 27, 2007. After his release from the Cubs, he re-signed with the St. Paul Saints of the American Association.

== Post-playing career ==
Harrington was as of 2009 working for the local Costco store, in the tire department, earning $11.50 per hour.

He was able to salvage a portion of the baseball money he turned down, due to a settlement of an insurance policy he took out in 2000 for loss of skill from Lloyd's of London. Also, Harrington filed a lawsuit against Tanzer, which was settled out of court.
