= Peabody, Massachusetts =

- City
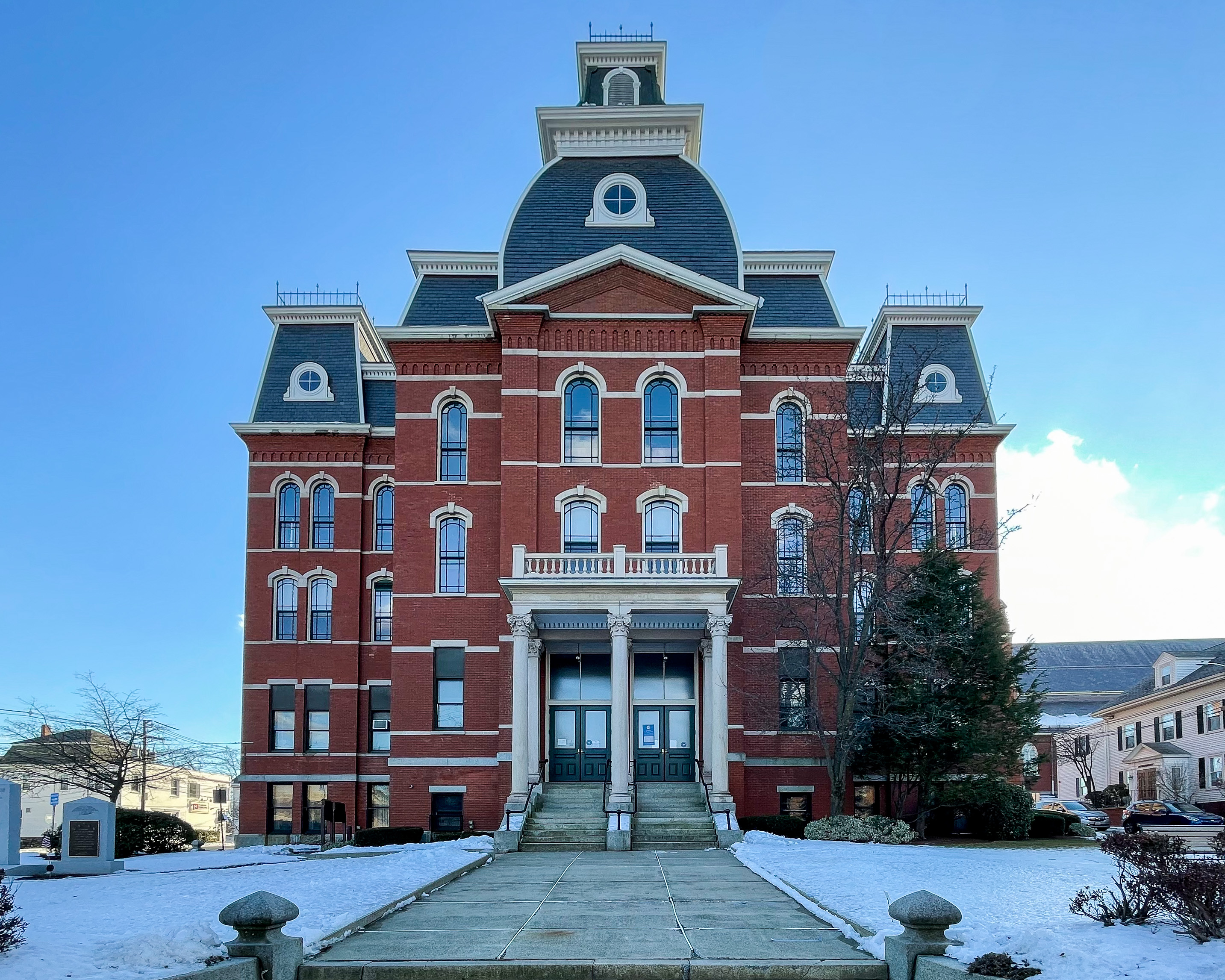
- Peabody City Hall in 2021

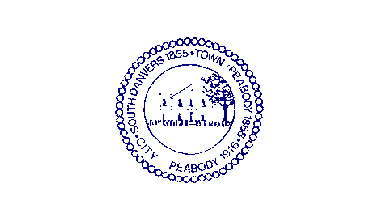
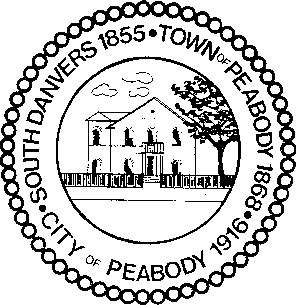
- Flag Seal
- Nicknames: Tanner City, The Leather City
- Location in Essex County and the state of Massachusetts

- Location in the United States Peabody (the United States)
- Coordinates: 42°31′40″N 70°55′45″W
- Country: United States
- State: Massachusetts
- County: Essex
- Settled: 1626
- Incorporated: 1855 (town)
- Incorporated: 1916 (city)
- Named for: George Peabody
- Seat: Peabody City Hall

Government
  - Type: Mayor-council city
  - Mayor: Edward A. Bettencourt Jr.

Area
  - Total: 16.81 sq mi (43.54 km^{2})
  - Land: 16.24 sq mi (42.05 km^{2})
  - Water: 0.58 sq mi (1.49 km^{2})
- Elevation: 16 ft (5 m)

Population (2020)
  - Total: 54,481
  - Density: 3,355.4/sq mi (1,295.54/km^{2})
- Time zone: UTC−5 (Eastern)
  - Summer (DST): UTC−4 (Eastern)
- ZIP Codes: 01960–01961 (Peabody); 01940 (Lynnfield)
- Area code: 351/978
- FIPS code: 25-52490
- GNIS feature ID: 0614307
- Website: www.peabody-ma.gov

Peabody (/ˈpiːbədi/) is a city in Essex County, Massachusetts, United States. The population was 54,481 at the time of the 2020 United States census. Peabody is located in the North Shore region of Massachusetts, and is known for its rich industrial history.

== History ==
The area was long inhabited by Native American people known as the Naumkeag.

The area was settled as part of Salem in 1626 by a small group of English colonists from Cape Ann led by Roger Conant. It was subsequently referred to as the Northfields, Salem Farms, and Brooksby. Several area residents were accused of witchcraft during the Salem witch trials of the late 17th century, three of whom were executed (John Proctor, Giles Corey, and Martha Corey).

In 1752, the area was set off from Salem, and incorporated as a district of Danvers. It was referred to as "the South Parish", associated with a church located in present-day Peabody Square. In 1855, the community broke away from Danvers, and was incorporated as the independent town of South Danvers. The name was changed to Peabody on April 30, 1868, in honor of George Peabody, noted philanthropist born in present-day Peabody, widely regarded as the "father of modern philanthropy". It was granted city status in 1916. The western, less densely populated area of town is often separately, yet unofficially, referred to as West Peabody.

Peabody started off as a farming community, but its rivers and streams attracted mills which operated by water power. During the 18th-century, Peabody's Central Street corridor was a hub of pottery manufacturing, especially redware. In particular, Peabody was a major center of New England's leather industry, which attracted immigrants from all around the world.

By 1915, one-third of the population had been born outside the United States. In addition to becoming home to large Irish and Russian populations, Peabody developed a large community of laborers hailing from the Ottoman Empire, mostly Turkish and Kurdish speakers from the region of Harput, now known as Elazığ. The population was situated primarily on Walnut Street, where they filled boarding houses and coffee houses to such an extent that it became known as "Ottoman Street," and, more pejoratively and less accurately, "Peabody's Barbary Coast", as the United States was at war with the Ottoman Empire during World War I. One visitor even noted that signs in town were written in both English and Ottoman Turkish.

On the morning of October 28, 1915, twenty-one young children were killed in the St. Johns School fire in the downtown area on Chestnut Street. Their bodies were found after the fire subsided, huddled together and burnt beyond recognition, near the entrance just steps away from survival. As a result, Peabody became the first city in the United States to establish a law that all entrances or exits in public buildings be push-open, rather than by handle or knob.

The tanneries that lined Peabody's "Ottoman Street" remained a linchpin of the city's economy into the second half of the 20th century. The tanneries have since closed or been relocated elsewhere, but the city remains known locally as the Leather City or Tanner City. The mascot of Peabody Veterans Memorial High School is named the Tanners.

The loss of the tanneries was a huge blow to Peabody's economy, but the city has made up for the erosion of its industrial base, at least in part, through other forms of economic development. Early in the 20th century, Peabody joined the automobile revolution, hosting the pioneer Brass Era company, Corwin Manufacturing.

The Northshore Mall, originally known as the Northshore Shopping Center, is one of the region's largest shopping malls. The mall opened in September 1958 as an outdoor shopping center, and was built on farm land originally owned by Elias Hasket Derby, one of America's first millionaires. Centennial Park, an industrial park in the center of the city, has attracted several medical and technology companies. West Peabody, which was mostly farm land until the 1950s, has been developed into a middle-to-upper class residential area. Brooksby Farm, a 275-acre (1.11 km^{2}) working farm and conservation area has been one of the city's most popular destinations for decades.

== Geography ==
According to the United States Census Bureau, the city has a total area of 16.8 square miles (43.5 km^{2}), of which 16.2 square miles (42.0 km^{2}) is land and 0.58 square miles (1.5 km^{2}), or 3.46%, is water. The northwestern border of Peabody lies along the Ipswich River, with brooks feeding it, and the Waters River, a tributary of the Danvers River, drains the northeastern part of town. Several other ponds and a portion of Suntaug Lake lie within town. The largest protected portion of the city is the Brooksby Farm, whose land includes the Nathaniel Felton Houses.

The city is wedge-shaped, with the city center located in the wider northeastern end. The neighborhood of South Peabody lies south of it, and the more suburban neighborhood of West Peabody, where the high school is located, lies to the west of the city center, separated by the highways and the Proctor neighborhood. Peabody's center is 2 miles (3 km) from the center of Salem, 15 miles (24 km) northeast of Boston, 18 miles (29 km) west-southwest of Gloucester, and 18 miles (29 km) southeast of Lawrence. Peabody is also bordered by Middleton to the northwest, Danvers to the north, Salem to the east, Lynn to the south and Lynnfield to the southwest.

== Demographics ==
Historical population
Year	Pop.	±%
1860	6,549	—
1870	7,343	+12.1%
1880	9,028	+22.9%
1890	10,158	+12.5%
1900	11,523	+13.4%
1910	15,721	+36.4%
1920	19,552	+24.4%
1930	21,345	+9.2%
1940	21,711	+1.7%
1950	22,645	+4.3%
1960	32,202	+42.2%
1970	48,080	+49.3%
1980	45,976	−4.4%
1990	47,039	+2.3%
2000	48,129	+2.3%
2010	51,251	+6.5%
2020	54,481	+6.3%
2024*	55,418	+1.7%
* = population estimate. Source: United States Census records and Population Estimates Program data. Source: U.S. Decennial Census

=== 2020 census ===
As of the 2020 census, Peabody had a population of 54,481. The median age was 47.0 years. 17.5% of residents were under the age of 18 and 24.2% of residents were 65 years of age or older. For every 100 females there were 88.8 males, and for every 100 females age 18 and over there were 86.0 males age 18 and over.

100.0% of residents lived in urban areas, while 0.0% lived in rural areas.

There were 22,315 households in Peabody, of which 25.4% had children under the age of 18 living in them. Of all households, 46.5% were married-couple households, 16.1% were households with a male householder and no spouse or partner present, and 31.7% were households with a female householder and no spouse or partner present. About 31.2% of all households were made up of individuals and 18.4% had someone living alone who was 65 years of age or older.

There were 23,191 housing units, of which 3.8% were vacant. The homeowner vacancy rate was 0.8% and the rental vacancy rate was 3.9%.

Racial composition as of the 2020 census
Race	Number	Percent
White	43,124	79.2%
Black or African American	1,964	3.6%
American Indian and Alaska Native	106	0.2%
Asian	1,336	2.5%
Native Hawaiian and Other Pacific Islander	13	0.0%
Some other race	3,409	6.3%
Two or more races	4,529	8.3%
Hispanic or Latino (of any race)	5,414	9.9%

=== 2010 census ===
As of the census of 2010, there were 51,251 people living in the city and a total of 22,220 housing units. The racial makeup of the city was 90.4% White, 2.4% African American, 6.3% Hispanic or Latino of any race (1.3% Puerto Rican, 0.3% Mexican, 0.1% Cuban, and 4.5% other Hispanic or Latino), 1.9% Asian, 3.8% from other races, and 1.6% from two or more races.

There were 21,313 households, of which 26.8% included children under the age of 18, 48.4% were married couples living together, 10.7% had a female householder with no husband present, and 37.1% were non-families. Of all households, 31.4% were made up of individuals, and 16.3% had someone living alone who was 65 years of age or older. The average household size was 2.28, and the average family size was 3.02.

In the city, the population was spread out, with 21.1% under the age of 20, 22.5% from 20 to 39, 29.8% from 40 to 59, and 26.5% who were 60 years of age or older. The median age of people in Peabody was 44.6. For every 100 females, there were 90.3 males. For every 100 females age 18 and over, there were 86.9 males.

The median income for a household in the city was $65,515, and the median income for a family was $80,471. Males had a median income of $55,352 versus $44,167 for females. About 4.4% of families and 6.3% of the population were below the poverty line, including 5.8% of those under age 18 and 7.9% of those age 65 or over.

=== Ancestry ===
The city has had a very large Greek population ever since the early 20th century. Ever since the mid-20th century, the Portuguese population has been very present, especially from the Azores. In the 21st century, Brazilians came in large swathes.

== Economy ==
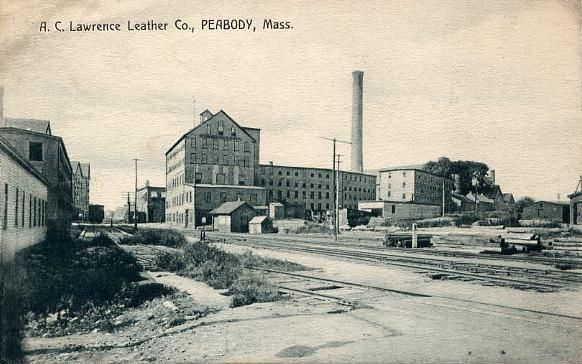
A.C. Lawrence Leather Company, c. 1910

=== Major employers ===
- Analogic Corporation
- Boston Children's Hospital
- Boston Acoustics
- Carl Zeiss AG
- Christian Book Distributors
- JEOL
- Lahey Hospital & Medical Center
- Meridian Interstate Bancorp
- Northshore Mall
- Saucony
- UTC Aerospace Systems

== Arts and culture ==
=== Points of Interest ===
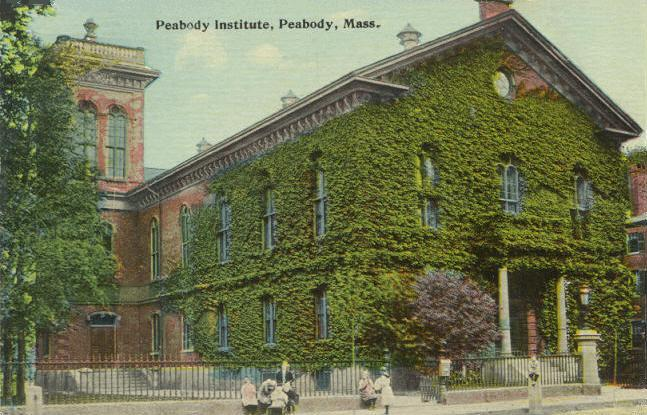
Peabody Institute Library, c. 1912

- Bell Inn and Tavern, built in 1897 and formerly known as the O'Shea Mansion. The original building on the property was the Bell Tavern, built in 1757 and demolished in 1840. Local minutemen met in the tavern's yard before the Battles of Lexington and Concord.
- Brooksby Farm, a 275-acre (111 ha) city-owned farm and conservation area.
- George Peabody House Museum, dedicated to George Peabody.
- North Shore Children's Museum, a city-owned museum.
- Peabody's Black Box Theater.
- Peabody Institute Library, a public library established in 1852 following a bequest from philanthropist and Peabody resident George Peabody.
- Tillie's Farm, a city-owned farm in South Peabody.
- Washington Street Historic District, a 19th-century residential neighborhood where many civic and business leaders of the time period built homes.

== Parks and recreation ==
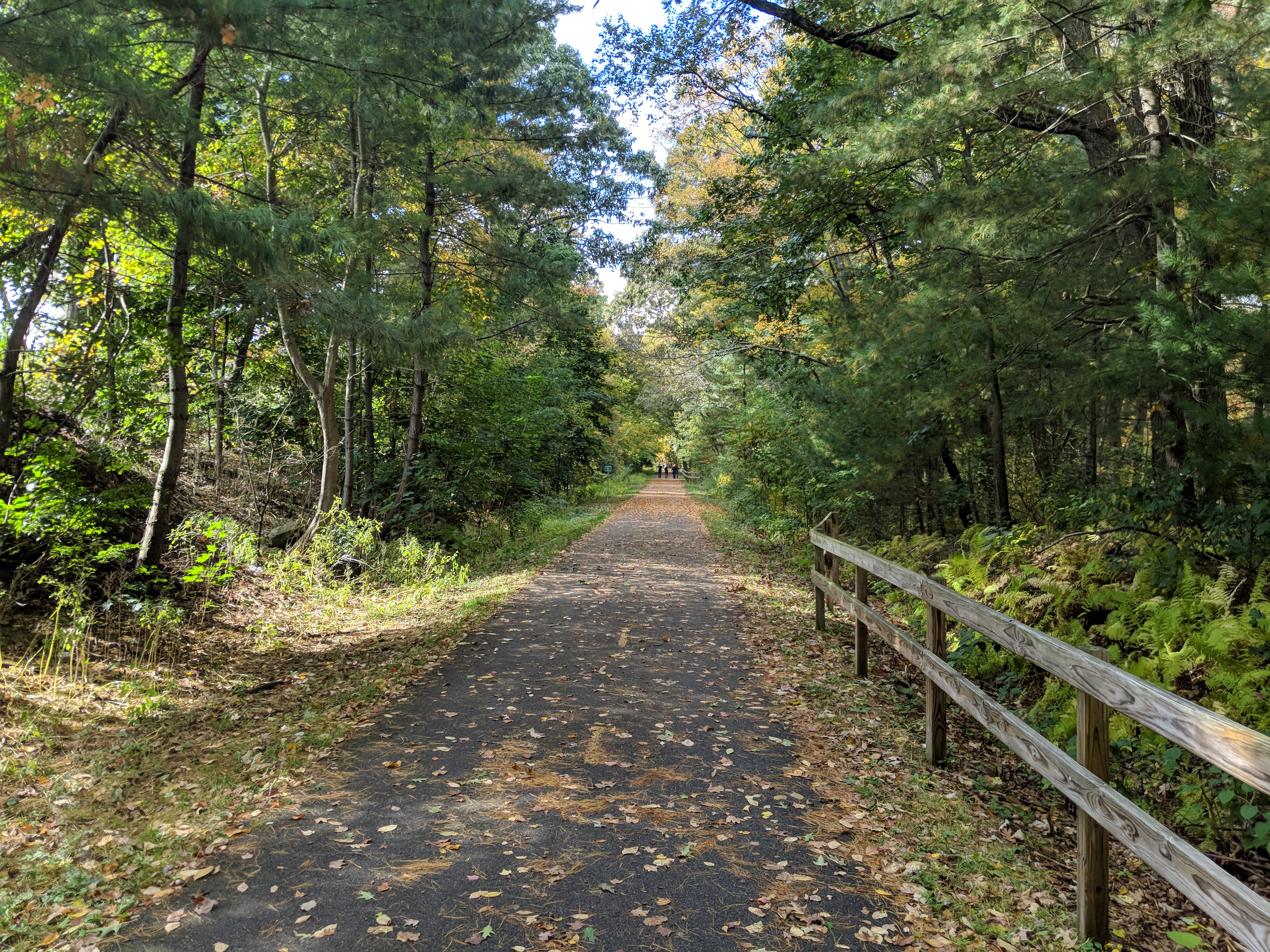
Independence Greenway

Salem Country Club is a privately owned country club and golf course, which hosted the U.S. Senior Open in 2001 and 2017, and the U.S. Women's Open in 1954 and 1984.

Independence Greenway is a 5.25 miles (8.45 km) rail-trail that is part of the Border to Boston trail.

Crystal Lake is a 21-acre conservation area and is part of the Ipswich River watershed.

Spring Pond is a lake that abuts Peabody, Lynn, and Salem.

== Government ==
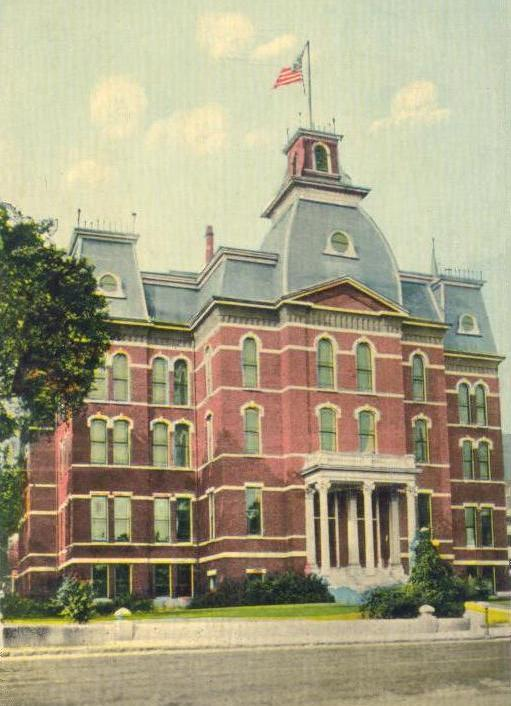
City Hall in 1912

Peabody is represented in the state legislature by officials elected from the following districts:

- Massachusetts Senate's 2nd Essex district
- Massachusetts House of Representatives' 12th Essex district
- Massachusetts House of Representatives' 13th Essex district

== Education ==
=== Public schools ===
Public education is administered by Peabody Public Schools. Schools include:

- Brown Elementary School
- Burke Elementary
- Carroll Elementary School
- Center Elementary School
- Higgins Middle School
- McCarthy Elementary
- South Elementary
- Veterans Memorial High School
- Welch Elementary
- West Elementary

=== Christian schools ===
- Bishop Fenwick High School, a Catholic private high school.
- Covenant Christian Academy, a Christian and classical preparatory school.
- St. John the Baptist School, a private Catholic school.

== Infrastructure ==
=== Transportation ===
Highways in Peabody include:

- Interstate 95
- Massachusetts Route 128
- Massachusetts Route 129
- U.S. Route 1
- Massachusetts Route 114

Several lines of the MBTA bus service pass through town. The Springfield Terminal rail line passes through town, with one line passing from Lynnfield towards Danvers, and another, mostly abandoned, line passing from Middleton to Salem. The nearest commuter rail service is in Salem, along the Newburyport/Rockport Line of the MBTA Commuter Rail, with service to Boston's North Station. The nearest airport is the Beverly Municipal Airport, and the nearest national and international air service is located at Boston's Logan International Airport.

=== Utilities ===
The municipally owned Peabody Municipal Light Plant provides electricity to the city. Natural gas service in Peabody is provided by National Grid. Cable television in Peabody is provided by Comcast and the City in June 2019 issued a second cable TV license to RCN.

== Notable people ==
- Jeff Allison, former professional baseball pitcher for the Florida Marlins from 2003 to 2011
- Daniel Ankeles, Maine state senator
- Matt Antonelli, former second basemen for the San Diego Padres of Major League Baseball
- Samantha Arsenault, Olympic swimming gold medalist
- Garcelle Beauvais, actress and author
- Frederick Berry, disability rights advocate, state senator from 1983 to 2013, majority leader of the Massachusetts State Senate from 2003 to 2013
- Matt Bloom, professional wrestler
- Nathaniel Bowditch, early American astronomer, mathematician, and navigator
- Patrick Francis Bresnahan, United States Navy veteran, Medal of Honor
- Emma Southwick Brinton, American Civil War army nurse, traveler, and foreign correspondent
- Kimberly S. Budd, Chief Justice of the Massachusetts Supreme Judicial Court
- Bobby Carpenter, NHL player in the 1980s and 1990s
- Giles Corey, victim of the Salem witch trials
- Martha Corey, victim of the Salem witch trials
- Chick Davies, Major League Baseball player
- Brad Delp, lead singer of the band Boston
- Jerry DeLucca, former professional football player in New England Patriots
- Mary Upton Ferrin, American suffragette and women's rights advocate
- Bob Franke, singer-songwriter
- Gary Gulman, comedian
- Hrishikesh Hirway, musician, producer, host of Song Exploder, and vocalist of The One AM Radio
- Daniel P. King, congressman from 1843 to 1850
- Christina Kirkman, teen actress, comedian, and circus performer
- Joe Klein, author, journalist (worked for The Peabody Times in the 1970s)
- Steve Lomasney, former Major League Baseball player
- David A. Lowy, Associate Justice of the Massachusetts Supreme Judicial Court
- Heather MacLean, competitive runner; competed at 2020 Summer Olympics
- Nicholas Mavroules, mayor from 1967 to 1978, congressman 1979 to 1993
- Ryan Montbleau, professional musician
- Jonathan Mover, professional drummer
- John Osepchuk, microwave engineer
- George Peabody, merchant, philanthropist, and namesake of the city
- Marc Predka, rapper known as Tha Trademarc
- John Proctor, victim of the Salem witch trials
- Patricia Goldman-Rakic, pioneering neuroscientist and professor
- Ruth Shoer Rappaport, scientist and vaccine researcher
- Charles Rosa, MMA fighter
- Pauline Sperry, mathematician
- John J. Studzinski, Investment banker and philanthropist
- John Tudor, Major League Baseball pitcher from 1979 to 1990
- Francis Robbins Upton, physicist and mathematician
- Dan Vassallo, marathon runner, 3-time Olympic Trials qualifier
- Rochelle Walensky, physician-scientist, director of the Centers for Disease Control and Prevention from 2021 to 2023
- Jack Welch, chairman and CEO of General Electric from 1981 to 2001
- Nancy Werlin, book author
