= Scott Symons (American football) =

American football coach

Dallas Cowboys
- Title: Inside linebackers coach

Career information
- Position: Linebacker
- College: Lindenwood (2004–2007)

Career history
- St. Dominic HS (MO) (2007) Wide receivers coach & linebackers coach; Harding (2008) Graduate assistant; Harding (2009) Cornerbacks coach; Harding (2010–2011) Co-defensive coordinator & recruiting coordinator; Arkansas State (2012) Defensive quality control coach; Arkansas Tech (2013) Defensive coordinator & defensive backs coach; West Georgia (2014–2017) Defensive coordinator & safeties coach; Memphis (2018) Linebackers coach; Liberty (2019–2021) Defensive coordinator; SMU (2022–2025) Defensive coordinator & safeties coach; Dallas Cowboys (2026–present) Inside linebackers coach

Scott Symons is an American football coach who is currently the inside linebackers coach for the Dallas Cowboys of the National Football League (NFL).

== Playing career ==
Symons grew up in Hurst, Texas and graduated from Fort Worth Christian School in 2004, where was a second-team all-state linebacker. He went on to play college football for the Lindenwood Lions.

== Coaching career ==
In 2007, Symons got his first career coaching job as he was hired by St. Dominic High School as the team's linebackers and wide receiver coach. He got his first college coaching job at Harding University in 2008, where he served in multiple roles such as a graduate assistant, defensive backs coach, co-defensive coordinator and recruiting coordinator up until 2011. In 2012, Symons joined the Arkansas State Red Wolves as a defensive quality control coach. In 2013, he was hired by Arkansas Tech as the team's defensive coordinator and defensive backs coach. Ahead of the 2014 season, Symons joined the West Georgia Wolves as the team's defensive coordinator and safeties coach. In 2018, Symons was hired by the Memphis Tigers to coach the team's linebackers. After one season with the Tigers, he was hired to be the Liberty Flames defensive coordinator. In 2022, Symons joined the SMU Mustangs as the team's defensive coordinator and safeties coach. After helping the Mustangs make the playoffs in 2024, he earned an extension with the team.

On February 13, 2026, the Dallas Cowboys hired Symons as their inside linebackers coach under head coach Brian Schottenheimer.
