= Peabody Public Schools =

School district in Massachusetts, United States

Address
- 27 Lowell Street Peabody, Massachusetts, 01960; United States

District information
- Type: Public School District
- Grades: Pre Kindergarten to 12
- Superintendent: Dr. Josh Vadala
- NCES District ID: 2509360

Students and staff
- Students: 5,994 (2019-2020)
- Student–teacher ratio: 13.34
- Colors: Blue and White

Other information
- Website: peabody.k12.ma.us

Peabody Public Schools is a public school district on the North Shore of Massachusetts.It includes 8 elementary schools, 1 middle school, and 1 high school.

== Current Schools in the District ==
=== Elementary schools ===
1. Captain Samuel Brown School — 150 Lynn Street
2. John E. Burke School — 127 Birch Street
3. Thomas Carroll School — 60 Northend Street
4. Center Elementary School — 18 Irving Street
5. John E. McCarthy Memorial School — 76 Lake Street
6. South Memorial School — 16 Maple Street Extension
7. William A. Welch Sr. Elementary School — 50 Swampscott Avenue
8. West Memorial Elementary School — 15 Bow Street

=== Junior high schools ===
1. J. Henry Higgins Middle School — 85 Perkins Street

=== Secondary schools ===
1. Peabody Veterans Memorial High School — 485 Lowell Street
2. Peabody Community High School — 485 Lowell Street; D House

== Former Schools in the District ==
1. Kiley Brothers Memorial Elementary School— 21 Johnson Street
2. Farnsworth Elementary School 103 Central Street
3. John F. Kennedy Junior High School 83 Pine Street
