= Tommy Tanzer =

American baseball agent

Tommy Tanzer is a former American baseball agent who represented Major League Baseball players such as Steve Finley, John Burkett, Sterling Hitchcock, Paul Abbott, Jason Johnson, Chone Figgins, José Molina, Charlie Hayes, Dante Bichette and Shane Reynolds, Kirk Rueter, Gary DiSarcina, Dave Hollins, Stan Belinda, and managers Joe Maddon and Grady Little.

In 1998, Tanzer represented five First Round Draft picks, and in 2000, Tanzer represented six First Round picks, five of whom signed for bonuses totaling $7 million. High school pitcher Matt Harrington, was drafted with the seventh overall selection in the 2000 MLB Draft by the Colorado Rockies.

After extensive pre-draft negotiations, the Rockies allegedly agreed to a $4.95 million signing bonus. Tanzer informed the six teams picking before the Rockies that an agreement had been reached for $4.95 million and each team selected other players. The Rockies then supposedly reneged, claiming they never made the offer. Harrington and Tanzer were never able to agree to terms on a contract with the Rockies. The Rockies made a lower offer of $4 million, but Harrington opted not to sign. Harrington was selected in the second round in 2001 by the San Diego Padres, but before an agreement was reached, Harrington terminated Tanzer and signed with agent Scott Boras. Harrington, under Boras's guidance, did not sign with the Padres, and went unsigned through five more drafts, before eventually taking a $1,000 bonus to sign with the Chicago Cubs. He never made it out of Spring Training.

As a result of the Rockies' role in stonewalling Harrington and attempting to undermine his relationship with Tanzer, Tanzer sued the Colorado Rockies, Scott Boras, agent Jeff Moorad, agent Brian Peters, and writer Tracy Ringolsby of the Rocky Mountain News for tortious interference, fraud and libel. The suit against Ringolsby was dismissed, and Tanzer was ordered to pay legal fees totalling nearly $70,000 for his frivolous suit against Ringolsby. The other suits lasted four years and was settled for the result of nothing but a public apology from the Colorado Rockies for its wrongdoing. During this period, Boras, working on a contingency fee for the Harringtons, sued Tanzer for his inability to close the deal with the Rockies. That suit was settled in a three-way mediation, which included Lloyd's of London. Tanzer and his associates had encouraged Harrington to purchase a $5 million net ascertained, loss of skill policy from the insurance giant as talks with the Rockies broke down. At the mediation, when Boras became aware of the Lloyd's policy, the attention shifted from Tanzer to the insurance company. Within days, Harrington and Boras dropped the suit against Tanzer and agreed on a $2.5 million settlement with Lloyd's, which was tax-free, and was the equivalent to the amount Harrington would have received, after taxes, from the Rockies' $4.95 million bonus. However, Harrington did not realize the full amount, because of an agreement to pay Boras a 40% contingency fee.

Soon after these settlements, Tanzer sold his company to Alan Nero's agency, CSMG, which, in 2008, was purchased by Octagon.

Tanzer has remained in Park City, Utah, his home since 1978, where he spends his time working with a number of charitable institutions. He is the founder and chairman of Back to Our Roots, which raises scholarship money for local students to attend college. In eight years, Back to Our Roots has raised over $400,000 and helped 36 students go to college. Tanzer supports a mentoring program in conjunction with the school district's Latinos In Action program. He also serves on the fundraising board for Temple Har Shalom in Park City.
