= Grady Emerson =

American baseball player (born 2008)

Tampa Bay Rays
- Shortstop
- Born: February 21, 2008 (age 18); Grapevine, Texas, U.S.
- Bats: Left Throws: Right
- Stats at Baseball Reference
Medals
Men's baseball
Representing United States
U-18 Baseball World Cup
Gold medal – first place	2025 Naha-Itoman	Team

Grady Parker Emerson (born February 21, 2008) is an American professional baseball shortstop in the Tampa Bay Rays organization.

== Amateur career ==
Emerson began his high school career at Argyle High School in Argyle, Texas. As a freshman in 2023, he hit .336 with 35 RBI and made only two errors in 258 chances. In 2024, as a sophomore, he batted .380 with four home runs, 24 RBI, and 19 stolen bases. As a junior in 2025, he hit .351 with 25 RBI. After his junior year in 2025, he transferred to Fort Worth Christian School in North Richland Hills, Texas, for his senior season. During the summer of 2025, he played in the High School All-American Game at Dodger Stadium and also placed second in the home run derby. Emerson played for the United States national under-15 baseball team in 2022 and 2023, and the United States national under-18 baseball team in 2024 and 2025.

In 2026, Emerson slashed .532/.648/1.013 with seven home runs, 50 RBI, and 31 stolen bases alongside a .992 fielding percentage at shortstop. He was named the Gatorade Baseball Player of the Year and Baseball America High School Player of the Year. Following the end of his high school career, he was invited to attend the 2026 MLB Draft Combine at Chase Field. Emerson originally committed to play college baseball for the TCU Horned Frogs but later flipped his commitment to the Texas Longhorns.

== Professional career ==
Emerson was considered a top prospect for the 2026 Major League Baseball draft. He was selected by the Tampa Bay Rays with the second overall pick. On July 22, 2026, he signed with the Rays for a $9.75 million signing bonus. This was the largest bonus ever awarded to a high school player and the second-largest in MLB draft history.

Emerson was assigned to the Single-A Charleston RiverDogs to make his professional debut. He played in 13 games and had a .176 batting average with three RBI across 51 at-bats.
