= Ruth Shoer Rappaport =

American scientist and vaccine researcher (1937–2020)

Ruth Shoer Rappaport (née Shoer; April 22, 1937 – April 28, 2020) was an American scientist and vaccine researcher.

== Early life and education ==
Born on April 22, 1937 to Jennie (Pearl) Shoer and Irving Shoer, Ruth Shoer grew up in Peabody, Massachusetts. She graduated from Peabody High School and, along with her twin sister, graduated from Vassar College in 1959. She continued her studies at Yale University and earned her Ph.D. in 1967.

== Career ==
Ruth Shoer Rappaport was the first woman hired as a scientist at Wyeth Laboratories. She worked at Wyeth for four decades and rose to become the senior director of clinical immunology and virology at the company. Her research contributed to the development of vaccines for several diseases such as influenza, HIV, human rotavirus, adenovirus, E. coli, and cholera. Throughout her career, Shoer authored dozens of scientific papers.

== Personal life ==
Ruth Shoer Rappaport had two sisters, Patricia Goldman-Rakic, her identical twin, and Linda Faith Schoer. Shoer Rappaport was Jewish.

== Death ==
Ruth Shoer Rappaport died on April 28, 2020, in Philadelphia, Pennsylvania at 83 years old. She is buried at Maple Hill Cemetery in Peabody.

Shoer Rappaport bequeathed $1 million to her alma mater Peabody Veterans Memorial High School.
