= Steve Lomasney =

American baseball player (born 1977)

- Catcher
- Born: August 29, 1977 (age 47); Melrose, Massachusetts, U.S.
- Batted: Right Threw: Right

MLB debut
- October 3, 1999, for the Boston Red Sox

Last MLB appearance
- October 3, 1999, for the Boston Red Sox

MLB statistics
- Games played: 1
- At bats: 2
- Hits: 0
- Stats at Baseball Reference

Teams
- Boston Red Sox (1999)

Steven James Lomasney (born August 29, 1977) is an American former professional baseball catcher who played in a single Major League Baseball (MLB) game. In the late 1990s, he was a highly regarded prospect for the Boston Red Sox. During his career, he batted and threw right-handed, stood 6 feet 0 inches (1.83 m) tall, and weighed 185 pounds (84 kg).

== Early years ==
Lomasney grew up in Peabody, Massachusetts, where he played both baseball and football. He became a local hero when he caught for the Peabody High School baseball team that won the Greater Boston League Championship and played quarterback and defensive end for two Massachusetts Super Bowl teams. Lomasney was named the MVP of the Greater Boston League, Player of the Year, and a member of All-Scholastic teams in football and baseball.

== Playing career ==
After being selected by Boston in the fifth round of the 1995 MLB draft, Lomasney signed with the Red Sox on June 29, 1995. He became a rising star in the system, and given his roots, a much-hoped-for future Fenway Park favorite.

In 1999, Lomasney split time between the Class A-Advanced Sarasota Red Sox and Double-A Trenton Thunder; overall he batted .259 with 20 home runs and 59 RBIs and was named Minor League Player of the Year for Sarasota. Lomasney's major league career consisted of a single game played at Camden Yards in Baltimore on October 3, 1999, the final regular season game for the 1999 Red Sox. He came into the game as a defensive replacement for Jason Varitek in the bottom of the fifth inning. Offensively, Lomasney batted twice, striking out both times, while defensively he threw out two runners who tried to steal second base. Scott Hatteberg replaced Lomasney in the bottom of the 10th inning as Tim Wakefield retired the side to save a 1–0 Boston victory.

Lomasney suffered a serious eye injury with the Triple-A Pawtucket Red Sox in August 2001, when he was hit in the face with a batted ball during batting practice; his eyesight never fully recovered. He remained in the Red Sox organization until 2002, when he was granted free agency. He moved through the farm systems of the Baltimore Orioles, Cincinnati Reds, and Minnesota Twins, before being released by the Twins on August 3, 2006. Overall, in 12 seasons of Minor League Baseball, Lomasney batted .229 with 93 home runs and 395 RBIs in 918 games played.
