= Fort Worth Christian School =

Location
- 6200 Holiday Lane; North Richland Hills, Texas 76180; United States; 32.856847°N 97.21945°W

Information
- School type: Private
- Motto: "Empowering students for a lifetime of faith, service, and leadership for Christ"
- Established: 1958
- President: Dr. Terry Rodgers
- Principal: Nick Hinrichsen (Upper School); Chris Dodd (Middle School); Nate Stanford (Lower School)
- Teaching staff: 44.3 (2019–20)
- Grades: PK–12
- Gender: Coed
- Enrollment: 745 (2024-25)
- Student to teacher ratio: 13.3 (2024–25)
- Campus size: 40 acres
- Colors: Red and White
- Athletics: TAPPS (group 5A)
- Mascot: Cardinal
- Yearbook: The Cardinal
- Website: fwc.org

Fort Worth Christian School is a private Christian preparatory school in North Richland Hills, Texas. Established in 1958, the school serves students in preschool through grade 12.

On February 27, 2010, George W. Bush spoke at the school's annual Cardinal Gala at the Omni Hotel in Fort Worth, Texas.

All high school and middle school students are given a personal Chromebook. In the elementary school, students use iPads to assist in their learning.

== History ==
Fort Worth Christian School first opened its doors in the fall of 1958, offering kindergarten through eighth grade and a junior college, then adding a grade every year, and finally adding a preschool. In 1972, the school phased out the junior college.

The school is accredited by the Council on Educational Standards and Accountability (CESA). The school is a member of the National Christian Schools Association, the Texas Association of Non-Public Schools, the Texas Christian Schools Association, the Texas Independent School Consortium, and the Texas Association of Private and Parochial Schools.

== Campus ==
The school sits on more than 40 acres in the geographic center of North Richland Hills. Major facilities on campus include the Campus Center (Opened in 2003), Center for Science and Technology, Administration Building, The Cardinal Gym, The Mitchell Gym, Gene and Dorthy Barrow Field, and Keck-Horton Field (Baseball), and The Performing Arts Center.

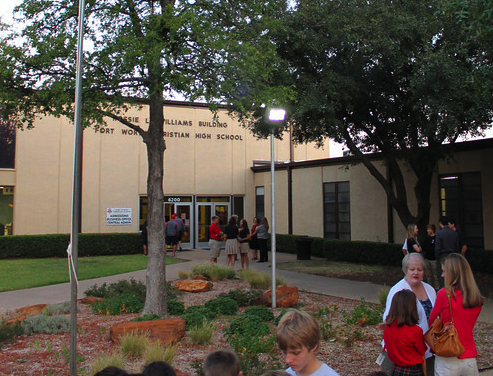
Students and parents gathering in front of the high school for See You at the Pole.

== Curriculum ==
In addition to its college-prep curriculum, Fort Worth Christian offers Advanced Placement and dual enrollment courses. All grades have a Bible class included in each student's schedule, along with daily chapel provided by the faculty and staff.

Fort Worth Christian offers Dual-Credit, AP, and Pre-AP classes in the social sciences, language, religion, and fine arts area. The Dual-Enrollment (Dual-Credit) classes enroll students in the class with Texas Wesleyan University and Colorado Christian University, giving them college credit. Fort Worth Christian offers multiple language courses:

As previously mentioned, Fort Worth Christian offers Dual-Credit, AP, and Pre-AP classes in the math and science area. The Center for Science and Technology has 3 science labs and 2 computer labs.

== Extracurricular activities ==
Students also publish a yearbook, The Cardinal. Student government consists of Student Council officers and class representatives from each grade level. National Honor Society members are selected from the student body based on grades and citizenship.

Students go on several class-related field trips, such as to NASA at the Johnson Space Center near Houston, Texas and to the International Thespian Society in Austin, Texas.

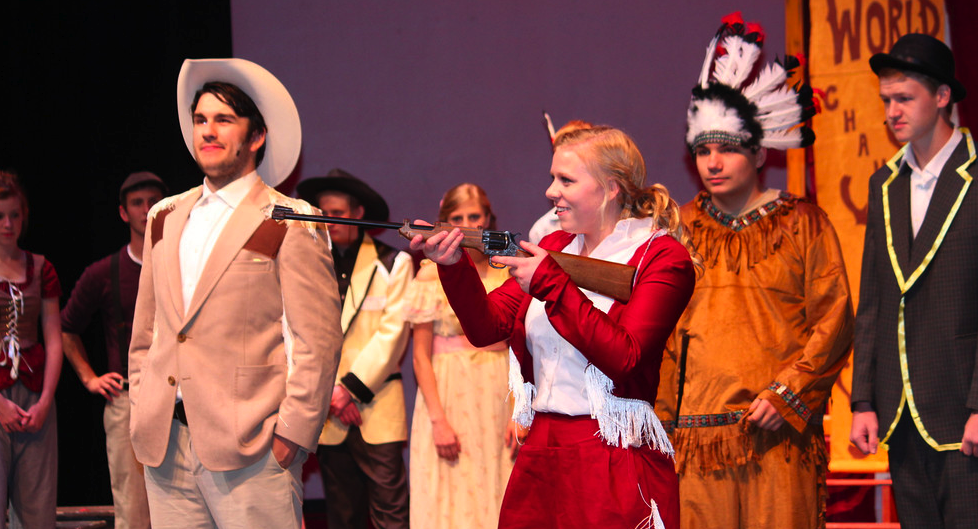
Students performing Irving Berlin's "Annie Get Your Gun" at the Fort Worth Community Arts Center.

Fort Worth Christian also offers students the opportunity to join service trips in Tanzania, Thailand, Nicaragua, Denver, East Texas and Peru). Fort Worth Christian also participates in an array of academic, literary, and musical state meets (e.g., TAPPS, TCSIT, etc.).

Fort Worth Christian School is a member of the Texas Association of Private and Parochial Schools. The Fort Worth Christian Cardinals teams compete in baseball, basketball, cheerleading, cross country, football, golf, soccer, softball, tennis, track, and volleyball. Fort Worth Christian also has an Arts and Theatre department, located in the Campus Center.

State championship titles earned by the school include:

- Cross country: 2010 (4A), 2011 (4A)
- Football: 1978, 1980, 1992, 2015
- Girls' basketball: 2002 (4A), 2004 (4A), 2005 (5A), 2006 (5A)
- Softball: 2001 (4A), 2011 (4A)
- Volleyball: 1979, 1985, 1986 (Division I), 1989 (3A-Girls), 2011 (4A-Girls)

== Notable alumni ==
- Scott Symons, college football coach
- Grady Emerson, top baseball prospect for the 2026 Major League Baseball draft
