= Massachusetts Educational Theater Guild =

The Massachusetts Educational Theater Guild (METG), previously known as the Massachusetts High School Drama Guild, is a theater arts located in Massachusetts supporting middle and secondary school students and teachers. METG organizes the statewide high school theatre festival in March.

== History ==
METG began in 1931 with the establishment of “Massachusetts Drama Day.” Four schools participated in the original competition, which was held at the old Huntington Chambers building in Copley Square in Boston. In the 1940s, the Massachusetts Secondary School Administrators Association became the educational sponsor of the state event.

1954 marked the beginning of two important corporate partnerships with the Guild: The Boston Globe became the lead patron, and John Hancock Hall became one of the Festival’s sponsors. It was also in this year that the Festival was relocated to John Hancock Hall in the Back Bay Events Center, where it has remained ever since. In 1989 the Guild’s horizons expanded with incorporation as a nonprofit organization. During the 1998-1999 school year, the Massachusetts Middle School Drama Festival, Inc. and the Massachusetts High School Drama Guild, Inc. merged. Since then the Guild has increased its membership to over 160 schools across the Commonwealth. In 2010 the name was changed to Massachusetts Educational Theater Guild.

In 2012, through the support of Broadway In Boston, the METG announced a new education project which offers both middle and high school members an opportunity to bring experienced adjudicators into their theaters where they will receive professional feedback on their hard work creating musical theater productions.
