= Pitch (softball) =

Gameplay

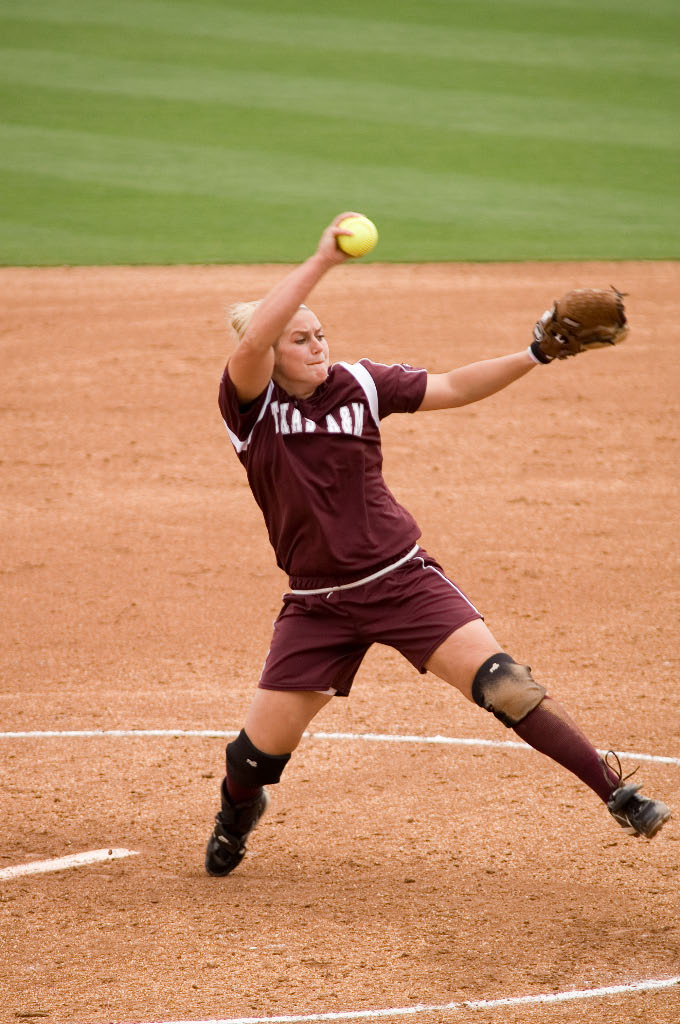
Megan Gibson pitching in a Big 12 match in 2007

In softball, a pitch is the act of throwing a ball underhand by using a windmill motion. The pitcher will throw the ball towards home plate to a catcher to start the play. The pitcher will attempt to strike out the batter or prevent the batters from getting on the bases.

The windmill motion is divided into 5 parts: back swing, arm rotation, final down swing, release, and follow through.

While executing the windmill with the throwing arm the lower half of the pitcher's body is working in tandem to drive towards home plate. "Weight transfer from the push off leg to the stride leg is critical to power and speed. A righthanded pitcher pushes off with her right leg and transfers her weight to her left leg."

The underhand pitch was the original baseball pitch. Originally created as a sport for baseball players to maintain dexterity in the off season, softball gained so much popularity, it became its own sport. In 1991, women's softball was added to the roster of the 1996 Summer Olympics.
