= Peabody Veterans Memorial High School =

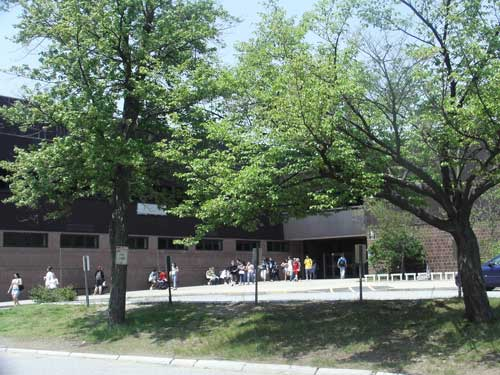

Location
- 485 Lowell Street; Peabody, Massachusetts 01960; United States; 42°32′41″N 70°58′27″W

Information
- Type: Public high school
- Motto: "Bulls Up! Hooah!"
- Established: 1850; 1971 (current building)
- Principal: Brooke Randall
- Faculty: 129.42 (on FTE basis)
- Grades: 9–12
- Enrollment: 1,333 (2024-2025)
- Student to teacher ratio: 10.30
- Colors: Blue and White
- Athletics conference: Northeastern Conference (NEC)
- Nickname: Tanners
- Accreditation: NEASC
- Website: peabody.k12.ma.us/schools/pvmhs

Peabody Veterans Memorial High School (PVMHS), also known as Peabody High School, is a comprehensive and competitive public high school in Peabody, Massachusetts, United States. It is the only comprehensive public high school in the Peabody School District, spanning grades 9–12 in the U.S. education system. It is particularly known for its performing arts program including instrumental and choral ensembles and drama club.

== History ==
Peabody High School has relocated four times since its establishment in 1850. From 1850 to 1855, the first Peabody High School was located at the Unitarian Church on Park Street in downtown Peabody. The building has since been converted into condominiums.

The second Peabody High School was located on Stevens Street from 1855 to 1903. The building is now a Veterans of Foreign Wars Post.

From 1904 to 1965, Peabody High School was located on Central Street. The building was later known as Seeglitz Junior High School and has since been renovated into affordable senior apartments owned by the Peabody Housing Authority.

The fourth Peabody High School was located on Perkins Street between 1966 and 1971. The building was later repurposed into the Higgins Middle School and was demolished in 2016.

The current Peabody High School, officially Peabody Veterans Memorial High School, was built on Lowell Street in 1972.

In 2023, the City of Peabody announced it would build a new high school or move forward with a major renovation of the current building on Lowell Street.

== Academics ==
The school's academic departments include AFJROTC, Business, Career and Technical Education, English, World Languages/ELL, Wellness, Mathematics, Performing Arts, Science, Social Studies, Special Education, and Visual Arts.

The Air ForceJunior Reserve Officers' Training Corps (AFJROTC) program is a military-based set of courses for students interested in pursuing a military career.

The Career and Technical Education Program has six approved career pathway programs: Cosmetology, Culinary Arts, Early Childhood Education, Electronics and Engineering, Medical Assisting, and Criminal Justice.

The Peabody Community School Program is a separate special education day school operated by PVMHS that assists students with emotional, behavioral, and learning disabilities. The school is a therapeutic environment with extensive differentiation, small classes, and focused behavioral programs.

== Student Health Center ==
In 2015, North Shore Community Health opened a school-based health center at PVMHS. The health center helps students with behavioral and medical health. Students are able to seek medical attention in a calm and comforting atmosphere.

=== Peabody Youth Advisory Council ===
The council advocates for easier access to health services. The group makes an annual trip to the Massachusetts State House in Boston, to speak with state politicians to increase the number of school health centers in the state and country. Students in the Youth Advisory Council represent Peabody at the School-based Health Conference, where students work with peers from across the country to promote healthier lifestyles and choices while also increasing awareness for many public health issues.

== Extracurricular activities ==
=== Theater program ===
The theater program, Stage One, was founded in 1970 by Father Frank Toste, a Catholic priest and member of the Congregation of Holy Cross. Stage One has placed in the top three at the Massachusetts High School Theater Festival, run annually by the Massachusetts Educational Theater Guild seven times: Equus in 1983, La Bête in 1997, Alchemy of Desire / Dead Man's Blues in 2012, Eurydice in 2015, The Long Christmas Ride Home in 2016, Yerma in 2023, and The Whale in 2024. The company puts on three shows a year: a fall show, a Festival home show which competes at the High School Theater Festival, and a spring musical.

=== Music programs ===
Chorale and mixed chorus participate in the Massachusetts Instrumental and Choral Conductors Association (MICCA) Festival. Chorale also conducts four singing talent shows per year.

PVMHS also has an a cappella group, Full House.

== Demographics ==
The reported racial makeup is 68.7% White, 23% Hispanic, 4% African American, 2.2% Asian/American Indian, 1.8% multiracial (non-Hispanic), 0.3% Native American, and 0% Native Hawaiian and Pacific Islander.

For assessment of selected populations, the reported statistics are 43.9% high needs, 28.7% economically disadvantaged, 19.7% students with disabilities, 7.0% students with their first language being non-English, and 3.8% English language learner.

== Notable alumni ==
- Jeff Allison, baseball player, instructor, and coach (minor league 2003–2011)
- Samantha Arsenault, swimmer (gold medal in women's 4×200-meter freestyle relay at the 2000 Summer Olympics)
- Matt Bloom, professional wrestler, commentator, and trainer (wrestling professionally 1997–2014)
- Kimberly S. Budd, Chief Justice of the Massachusetts Supreme Judicial Court
- Gary Gulman, comedian
- Steve Lomasney, baseball player (signed in 1995, one major league game in 1999, minor league until 2006)
- Heather MacLean, runner who competed at 2020 Summer Olympics
- Nicholas Mavroules, mayor from 1967 to 1978, congressman 1979 to 1993
- Patricia Goldman-Rakic, pioneering neuroscientist and professor
- Ruth Shoer Rappaport, scientist and vaccine researcher
- John Tudor, baseball player (major league 1979–1990)
- Nancy Werlin, author of young-adult novels (published works 1994–present)
- Charles Rosa UFC Fighter
- Jessica Sims fitness Instructor, sports reporter
