= Gatorade Player of the Year awards =

Awards given to high school student-athletes in the United States

The Gatorade Player of the Year awards are given annually to up and coming high school student-athletes in the United States. They are given for boys' baseball, boys' and girls' basketball, boys' and girls' cross country, boys' football, boys' and girls' soccer, boys' and girls' track & field, girls' softball, and girls' volleyball.

A "State Player of the Year" award is given to the best student-athlete in each of the twelve sports in the District of Columbia and each of the fifty states, where each sport is recognized as an interscholastic sport. Selection is based on three criteria: athletic achievement, academic excellence, and exemplary character (including sportsmanship, and participation in community and other activities). Twelve "National Player of the Year" awards are then given to the best student-athlete in each of the twelve sports, chosen from the state winners in the respective sport.

Finally, one male Athlete of the Year and one female Athlete of the Year are selected from the twelve National Player of the Year recipients. The two winners are voted on by a national panel with about 400 sports journalists, coaches, and others. In 2025, the two athletes of the year, Cameron Boozer and Jane Hedengren, received their awards at a special ceremony prior to The ESPY Awards.

The Gatorade Company established the awards in 1986. The selection process was administered by ESPN RISE, ESPN's division for high-school sports. The selection process is currently run by the Gatorade Player of the Year Selection Committee.

Past national winners include Peyton Manning and Emmitt Smith for football, LeBron James and Kobe Bryant for basketball, Allyson Felix for track and field, and Kerri Walsh for volleyball.

== Athletes of the Year ==
Awards include: (Note: For biographical sketches of the current winners, see:)

Male Athlete of the Year
Year	Winner	Sport	Hometown	College
2003	LeBron James	Basketball	Akron, OH	None
2004	Dwight Howard	Basketball	Atlanta, GA	None
2005	Greg Paulus	Football	Syracuse, NY	Duke (basketball), Syracuse (football)
2006	Greg Oden	Basketball	Indianapolis, IN	Ohio State
2007	Kevin Love	Basketball	Lake Oswego, OR	UCLA
2008	Matt Barkley	Football	Santa Ana, CA	USC
2009	Garrett Gilbert	Football	Austin, TX	Texas
2010	Brandon Knight	Basketball	Fort Lauderdale, FL	Kentucky
2011	Dylan Bundy	Baseball	Owasso, OK	None
2012	Johnathan Gray	Football	Aledo, TX	Texas
2013	Andrew Wiggins	Basketball	Thornhill, ON, Canada	Kansas
2014	Karl-Anthony Towns	Basketball	Metuchen, NJ	Kentucky
2015	Kyler Murray	Football	Allen, TX	Texas A&M / Oklahoma
2016	Jayson Tatum	Basketball	St. Louis, MO	Duke
2017	MacKenzie Gore	Baseball	Whiteville, NC	None
2018	J. T. Daniels	Football	Santa Ana, CA	USC / Georgia / West Virginia / Rice
2019	Bobby Witt Jr.	Baseball	Colleyville, TX	None
2020	Arik Gilbert	Football	Marietta, GA	LSU / Georgia
2022	Colin Sahlman	Cross country	Newbury Park, CA	NAU
2023	Max Clark	Baseball	Franklin, IN	None
2024	Cooper Flagg	Basketball	Newport, ME	Duke
2025	Cameron Boozer	Basketball	Miami, FL	Duke
2026	Grady Emerson	Baseball	Fort Worth, TX	TBA

Female Athlete of the Year
Year	Winner	Sport	Hometown	College
2003	Allyson Felix	Track & field	North Hills, CA	USC
2004	Candace Parker	Basketball	Naperville, IL	Tennessee
2005	Cynthia Barboza	Volleyball	Long Beach, CA	Stanford
2006	Tina Charles	Basketball	Middle Village, NY	UConn
2007	Maya Moore	Basketball	Lawrenceville, GA	UConn
2008	Chanelle Price	Track & field	Easton, PA	Tennessee
2009	Skylar Diggins	Basketball	South Bend, IN	Notre Dame
2010	Chiney Ogwumike	Basketball	Cypress, TX	Stanford
2011	Morgan Brian	Soccer	St. Simons Island, GA	Virginia
2012	Breanna Stewart	Basketball	North Syracuse, NY	UConn
2013	Morgan Andrews	Soccer	Milford, NH	Notre Dame
2014	Brianna Turner	Basketball	Manvel, TX	Notre Dame
2015	Candace Hill	Track & field	Conyers, GA	None
2016	Sydney McLaughlin	Track & field	Scotch Plains, NJ	Kentucky
2017	Sydney McLaughlin	Track & field	Scotch Plains, NJ	Kentucky
2018	Katelyn Tuohy	Cross country, track & field	Thiels, NY	NC State
2019	Kelley Lynch	Softball	Sharpsburg, GA	Washington
2020	Paige Bueckers	Basketball	Minnetonka, MN	UConn
2022	Kiki Rice	Basketball	Bethesda, Maryland	UCLA
2023	Ava Brown	Softball	Montgomery, TX	Florida
2024	Sadie Engelhardt	Track & field	Ventura, CA	NC State
2025	Jane Hedengren	Track & field	Provo, UT	BYU
2026	Maddie DiMaria	Soccer	St. Louis, MO	North Carolina

== National sports winners ==
Awards include: (Note: For the official list of winners (1985–present), see)

=== Baseball ===
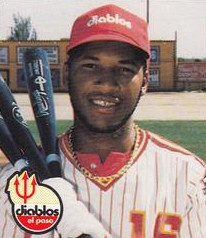
Gary Sheffield was the first winner of the award.

Year	Winner	Hometown	College
1986	Gary Sheffield	Tampa, FL	Did not attend
1987	Willie Banks	Jersey City, NJ	Did not attend
1988	Mark Lewis	Hamilton, OH	Did not attend
1989	Jeff Jackson	Chicago, IL	Did not attend
1990	Todd Van Poppel	Arlington, TX	Did not attend
1991	Brian Barber	Orlando, FL	Did not attend
1992	A. J. Hinch	Midwest City, OK	Stanford
1993	Alex Rodriguez	Miami, FL	Did not attend
1994	Doug Million	Sarasota, FL	Did not attend
1995	Chad Hutchinson	San Diego, CA	Stanford (football)
1996	Matt White	Waynesboro, PA	Did not attend
1997	Darnell McDonald	Englewood, CO	Did not attend
1998	Drew Henson	Brighton, MI	Michigan (football)
1999	B. J. Garbe	Moses Lake, WA	Did not attend
2000	Jason Stokes	Coppell, TX	Did not attend
2001	Casey Kotchman	Seminole, FL	Did not attend
2002	Zack Greinke	Apopka, FL	Did not attend
2003	Chris Lubanski	Collegeville, PA	Did not attend
2004	Mark Rogers	Topsham, ME	Did not attend
2005	Justin Upton	Chesapeake, VA	Did not attend
2006	Clayton Kershaw	Dallas, TX	Did not attend
2007	Rick Porcello	West Orange, NJ	Did not attend
2008	Kyle Skipworth	Riverside, CA	Did not attend
2009	Matt Hobgood	Norco, CA	Did not attend
2010	Kaleb Cowart	Adel, GA	Did not attend
2011	Dylan Bundy	Owasso, OK	Did not attend
2012	Lance McCullers Jr.	Tampa, FL	Did not attend
2013	Clint Frazier	Loganville, GA	Did not attend
2014	Justus Sheffield	Tullahoma, TN	Did not attend
2015	Luken Baker	Conroe, TX	TCU
2016	Kyle Muller	Dallas, TX	Did not attend
2017	MacKenzie Gore	Whiteville, NC	Did not attend
2018	Ryan Weathers	Loretto, TN	Did not attend
2019	Bobby Witt Jr.	Colleyville, TX	Did not attend
2020	Jared Kelley	Refugio, TX	Did not attend
2021	Dylan Lesko	Buford, GA	Did not attend
2022	Brock Porter	Orchard Lake Village, MI	Did not attend
2023	Max Clark	Franklin, IN	Did not attend
2024	Konnor Griffin	Flowood, MS	Did not attend
2025	Seth Hernandez	Corona, CA	Did not attend
2026	Grady Emerson	Fort Worth, TX	TBA

=== Basketball ===
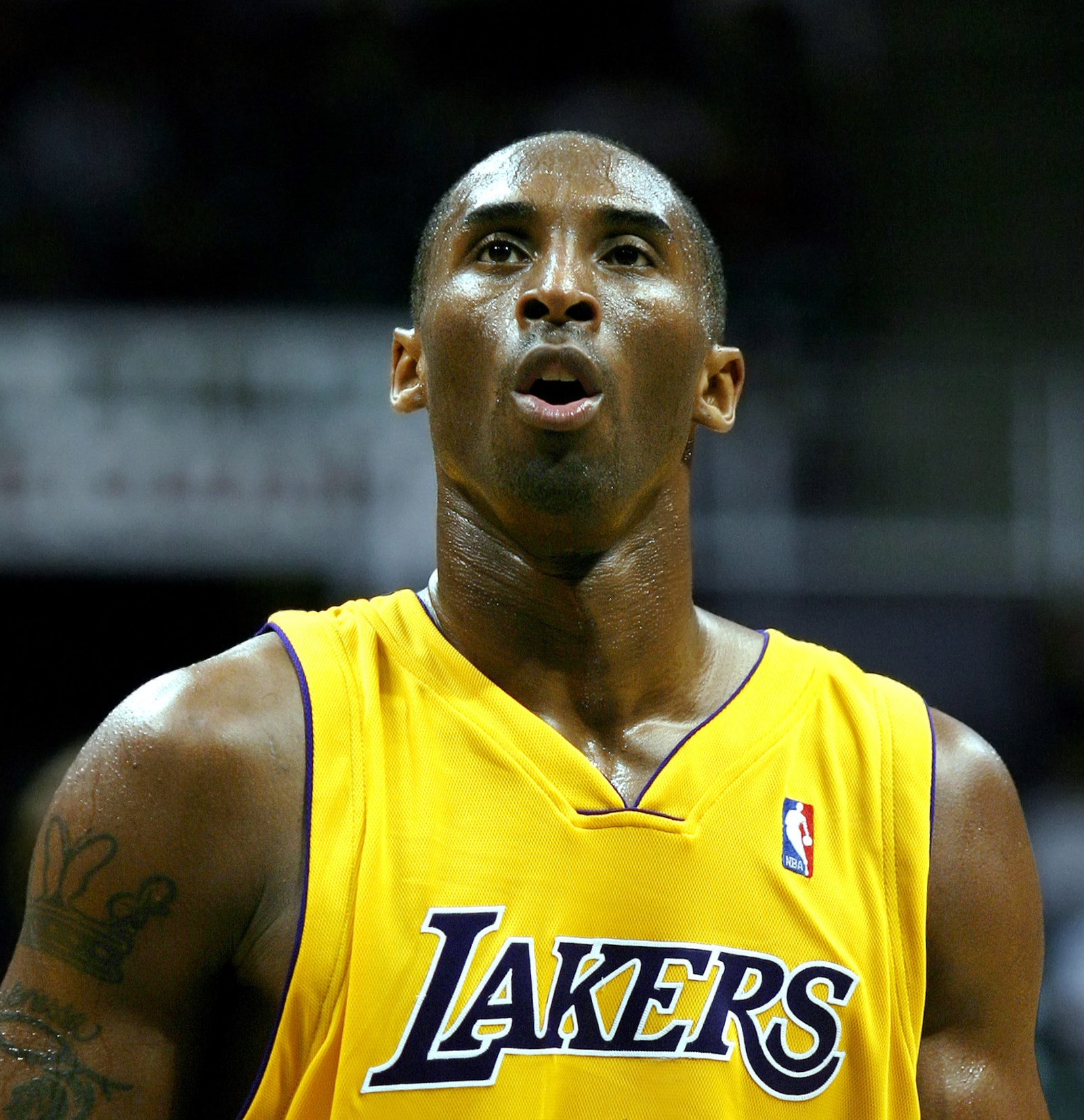
Kobe Bryant was the first winner not to play college basketball.

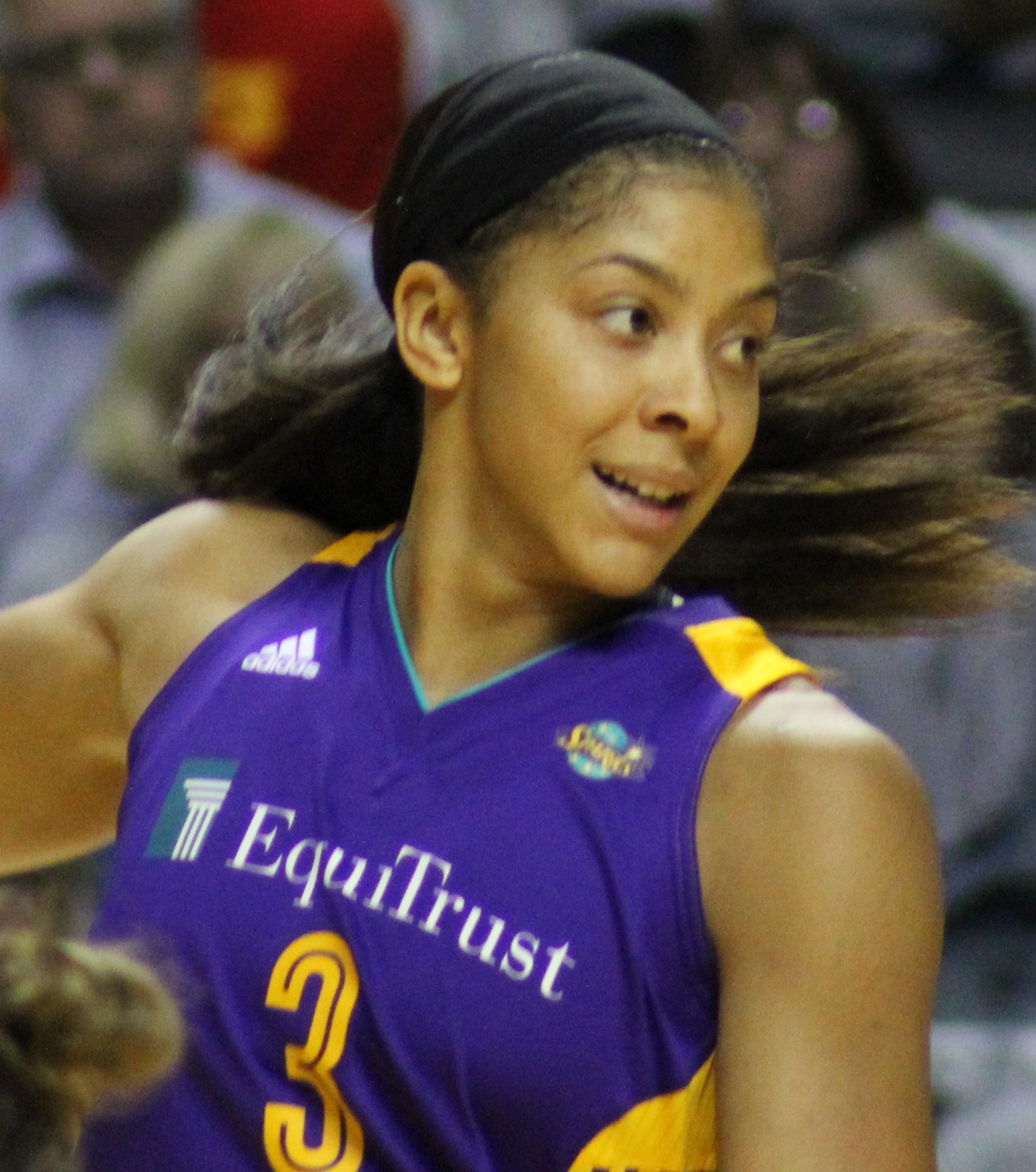
Candace Parker was the first female player to win the award multiple times.

Male Basketball Player of the Year
Year	Winner	Hometown	College
1986	J.R. Reid	Virginia Beach, VA	North Carolina
1987	LaBradford Smith	Bay City, TX	Louisville
1988	Alonzo Mourning	Chesapeake, VA	Georgetown
1989	Kenny Anderson	Jamaica, NY	Georgia Tech
1990	Damon Bailey	Bedford, IN	Indiana
1991	Chris Webber	Detroit, MI	Michigan
1992	Corliss Williamson	Russellville, AR	Arkansas
1993	Randy Livingston	New Orleans, LA	LSU
1994	Felipe López	New York, NY	St. John's
1995	Stephon Marbury	Brooklyn, NY	Georgia Tech
1996	Kobe Bryant	Ardmore, PA	Did not attend
1997	Baron Davis	Santa Monica, CA	UCLA
1998	Al Harrington	Elizabeth, NJ	Did not attend
1999	LaVell Blanchard	Ann Arbor, MI	Michigan
2000	Jared Jeffries	Bloomington, IN	Indiana
2001	Kelvin Torbert	Flint, MI	Michigan State
2002	LeBron James	Akron, OH	Did not attend
2003	LeBron James	Akron, OH	Did not attend
2004	Dwight Howard	Atlanta, GA	Did not attend
2005	Greg Oden	Indianapolis, IN	Ohio State
2006	Greg Oden	Indianapolis, IN	Ohio State
2007	Kevin Love	Lake Oswego, OR	UCLA
2008	Jrue Holiday	North Hollywood, CA	UCLA
2009	Brandon Knight	Fort Lauderdale, FL	Kentucky
2010	Brandon Knight	Fort Lauderdale, FL	Kentucky
2011	Bradley Beal	St. Louis, MO	Florida
2012	Jabari Parker	Chicago, IL	Duke
2013	Andrew Wiggins	Thornhill, ON, Canada	Kansas
2014	Karl-Anthony Towns	Metuchen, NJ	Kentucky
2015	Ben Simmons	Melbourne, Australia	LSU
2016	Jayson Tatum	St. Louis, MO	Duke
2017	Michael Porter Jr.	Columbia, MO	Missouri
2018	RJ Barrett	Mississauga, ON, Canada	Duke
2019	James Wiseman	Nashville, TN	Memphis
2020	Emoni Bates	Ann Arbor, MI	Memphis / Eastern Michigan
2021	Chet Holmgren	Minneapolis, MN	Gonzaga
2022	Gradey Dick	Wichita, KS	Kansas
2023	Cameron Boozer	Miami, FL	Duke
2024	Cooper Flagg	Newport, ME	Duke
2025	Cameron Boozer	Miami, FL	Duke
2026	Jordan Smith Jr.	Fairfax, VA	Arkansas

Female Basketball Player of the Year
Year	Winner	Hometown	College
1986	Susan Anderson	Deming, WA	Texas
1987	Kris Durham	Scotch Plains, NJ	Seton Hall
1988	Vicki Hall	Indianapolis, IN	Texas
1989	Lisa Harrison	Louisville, KY	Tennessee
1990	Lisa Leslie	Inglewood, CA	USC
1991	Michelle M. Marciniak	Allentown, PA	Notre Dame / Tennessee
1992	Katie Smith	Logan, OH	Ohio State
1993	La'Keshia Frett	Hampton, VA	Georgia
1994	Monick Foote	Wilmington, DE	Virginia
1995	Stephanie White	West Lebanon, IN	Purdue
1996	Jaime Walz	Fort Thomas, KY	Western Kentucky
1997	Nikki Teasley	Frederick, MD	North Carolina
1998	Tamika Williams	Dayton, OH	UConn
1999	Nicole Kaczmarski	Middle Island, NY	UCLA
2000	Shereka Wright	Copperas Cove, TX	Purdue
2001	Shyra Ely	Indianapolis, IN	Tennessee
2002	Ann Strother	Highlands Ranch, CO	UConn
2003	Candace Parker	Naperville, IL	Tennessee
2004	Candace Parker	Naperville, IL	Tennessee
2005	Abby Waner	Highlands Ranch, CO	Duke
2006	Tina Charles	Middle Village, NY	UConn
2007	Maya Moore	Lawrenceville, GA	UConn
2008	Nneka Ogwumike	Cypress, TX	Stanford
2009	Skylar Diggins	South Bend, IN	Notre Dame
2010	Chiney Ogwumike	Cypress, TX	Stanford
2011	Kaleena Mosqueda-Lewis	Santa Ana, CA	UConn
2012	Breanna Stewart	North Syracuse, NY	UConn
2013	Mercedes Russell	Springfield, OR	Tennessee
2014	Brianna Turner	Manvel, TX	Notre Dame
2015	Katie Lou Samuelson	Huntington Beach, CA	UConn
2016	Erin Boley	Hodgenville, KY	Notre Dame / Oregon
2017	Megan Walker	Richmond, VA	UConn
2018	Christyn Williams	Little Rock, AR	UConn
2019	Azzi Fudd	Arlington, VA	UConn
2020	Paige Bueckers	Minnetonka, MN	UConn
2021	Saniya Rivers	Wilmington, NC	South Carolina
2022	Kiki Rice	Bethesda, Maryland	UCLA
2023	JuJu Watkins	Los Angeles, CA	USC
2024	Joyce Edwards	Camden, SC	South Carolina
2025	Aaliyah Chavez	Lubbock, TX	Oklahoma
2026	Olivia Vukoša	Whitestone, NY	UConn

=== Cross country ===
Male Cross Country Athlete of the Year
Year	Winner	Hometown	College
2008	Chris Derrick	Naperville, IL	Stanford
2009	Reed Connor	The Woodlands, TX	Wisconsin
2010	Lukas Verzbicas	Orland Park, IL	Oregon
2011	Lukas Verzbicas	Orland Park, IL	Oregon
2012	Futsum Zienasellassie	Indianapolis, IN	Northern Arizona
2013	Edward Cheserek	Newark, NJ	Oregon
2014	Grant Fisher	Grand Blanc, MI	Stanford
2015	Grant Fisher	Grand Blanc, MI	Stanford
2016	Andrew Hunter	Purcellville, VA	Oregon
2017	Casey Clinger	American Fork, UT	BYU
2018	Aidan Troutner	Provo, UT	BYU
2019	Liam Anderson	Larkspur, CA	Stanford
2020	Nico Young	Newbury Park, CA	Northern Arizona
2021	Parker Wolfe	Greenwood Village, CO	North Carolina
2022	Colin Sahlman	Newbury Park, CA	Northern Arizona
2023	Daniel Simmons	American Fork, UT	BYU
2024	Daniel Simmons	American Fork, UT	BYU
2025	Charlie Vause	Rio Rancho, NM	BYU
2026	Jackson Spencer	Herriman, UT	BYU

Female Cross Country Athlete of the Year
Year	Winner	Hometown	College
2008	Ashley Brasovan	Wellington, FL	Duke
2009	Jordan Hasay	San Luis Obispo, CA	Oregon
2010	Megan Goethals	Rochester Hills, MI	Washington
2011	Aisling Cuffe	Cornwall, NY	Stanford
2012	Molly Seidel	Hartland, WI	Notre Dame
2013	Sara Baxter	Simi Valley, CA	Oregon
2014	Alexa Efraimson	Camas, WA	
2015	Anna Rohrer	Mishawaka, IN	Notre Dame
2016	Katie Rainsberger	Colorado Springs, CO	Oregon
2017	Brie Oakley	Aurora, CO	California
2018	Katelyn Tuohy	Thiells, NY	NC State
2019	Katelyn Tuohy	Thiells, NY	NC State
2020	Katelyn Tuohy	Thiells, NY	NC State
2021	Sydney Thorvaldson	Rawlins, WY	Arkansas
2022	Natalie Cook	Flower Mound, TX	Oklahoma State
2023	Irene Riggs	Morgantown, WV	Stanford
2024	Addison Ritzenhein	Niwot, CO	NAU
2025	Jane Hedengren	Provo, UT	BYU
2026	Natasza Dudek	Ann Arbor, MI	

=== Football ===
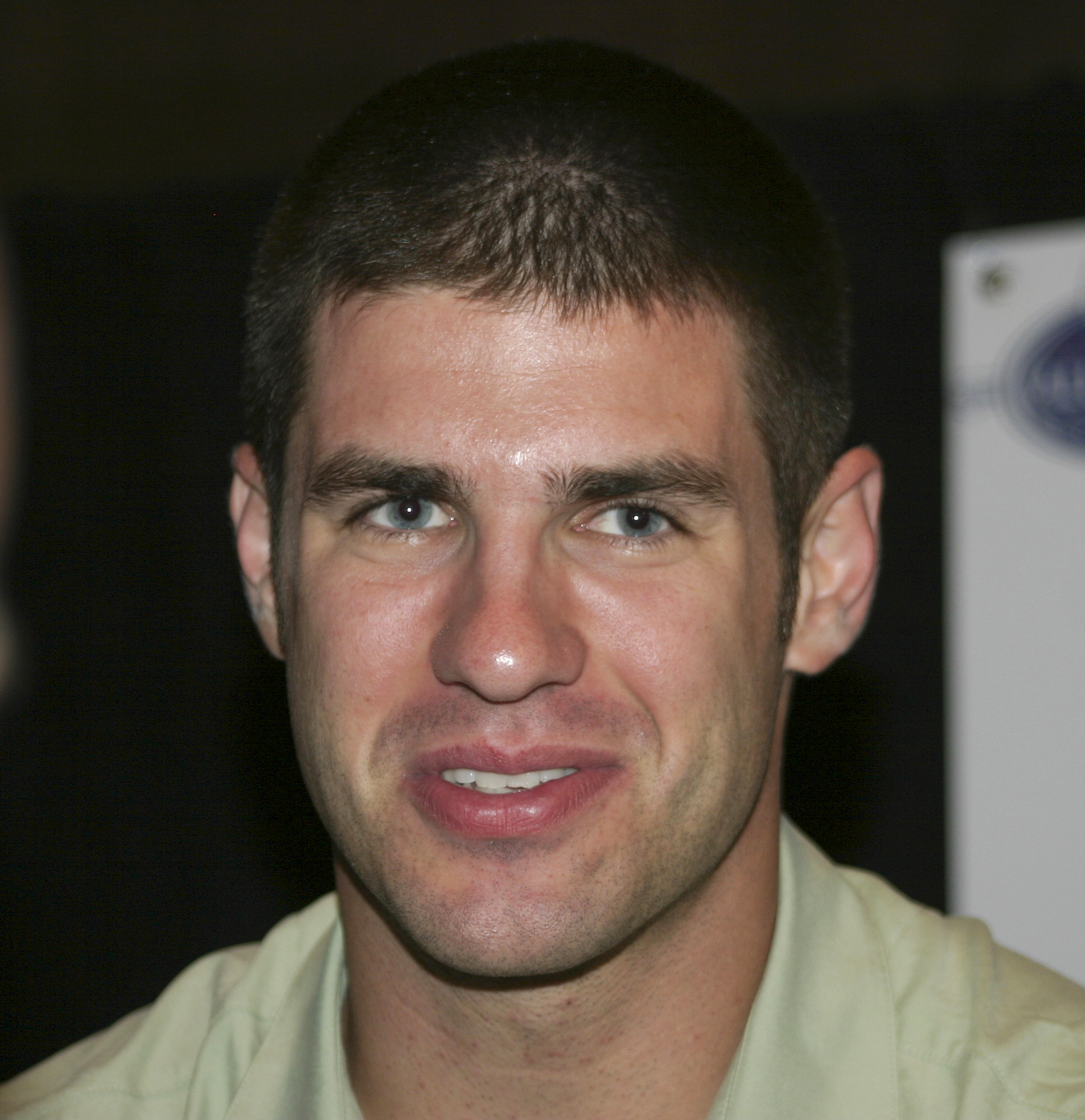
Joe Mauer was the first winner not to play football collegiately or professionally.

Year	Winner	Hometown	College
1986	Jeff George	Indianapolis, IN	Purdue / Illinois
1987	Emmitt Smith	Pensacola, FL	Florida
1988	Curtis Bray	Monroeville, PA	Pittsburgh
1989	Terry Kirby	Tabb, VA	Virginia
1990	Robert Smith	Euclid, OH	Ohio State
1991	Marquette Smith	Winter Park, FL	Florida State / Central Florida
1992	Chris Walsh	St. Paul, MN	Miami (FL) / Minnesota
1993	Ron Powlus	Berwick, PA	Notre Dame
1994	Peyton Manning	New Orleans, LA	Tennessee
1995	Brock Huard	Puyallup, WA	Washington
1996	Tim Couch	Hyden, KY	Kentucky
1997	Travis Minor	Baton Rouge, LA	Florida State
1998	Ronald Curry	Hampton, VA	North Carolina (football and basketball)
1999	Chris Lewis	Long Beach, CA	Stanford
2000	Brock Berlin	Shreveport, LA	Florida / Miami (FL)
2001	Joe Mauer	St. Paul, MN	Did not attend
2002	Lorenzo Booker	Oxnard, CA	Florida State
2003	Kyle Wright	Danville, CA	Miami (FL)
2004	Jeff Byers	Fort Collins, CO	USC
2005	Greg Paulus	Syracuse, NY	Duke (basketball) / Syracuse
2006	Mitch Mustain	Springdale, AR	Arkansas / USC
2007	John Brantley	Ocala, FL	Florida
2008	Matt Barkley	Santa Ana, CA	USC
2009	Garrett Gilbert	Austin, TX	Texas / SMU
2010	Malcolm Jones	Westlake Village, CA	UCLA
2011	Justin Worley	Rock Hill, SC	Tennessee
2012	Johnathan Gray	Aledo, TX	Texas
2013	Max Browne	Sammamish, WA	USC / Pittsburgh
2014	Andrew Brown	Chesapeake, VA	Virginia
2015	Kyler Murray	Allen, TX	Texas A&M / Oklahoma
2016	Jacob Eason	Lake Stevens, WA	Georgia / Washington
2017	Tate Martell	Las Vegas, NV	Ohio State / Miami (FL) / UNLV
2018	J. T. Daniels	Santa Ana, CA	USC / Georgia / West Virginia / Rice
2019	Jake Smith	Scottsdale, AZ	Texas / USC / Arizona State
2020	Arik Gilbert	Marietta, GA	LSU / Georgia / Nebraska / Savannah State
2021	Jaxson Dart	Draper, UT	USC / Ole Miss
2022	Nick Singleton	Shillington, PA	Penn State
2023	Jackson Arnold	Denton, TX	Oklahoma / Auburn / UNLV
2024	DJ Lagway	Willis, TX	Florida / Baylor
2025	Keelon Russell	Duncanville, TX	Alabama
2026	Jackson Cantwell	Nixa, MO	Miami (FL)

=== Soccer ===
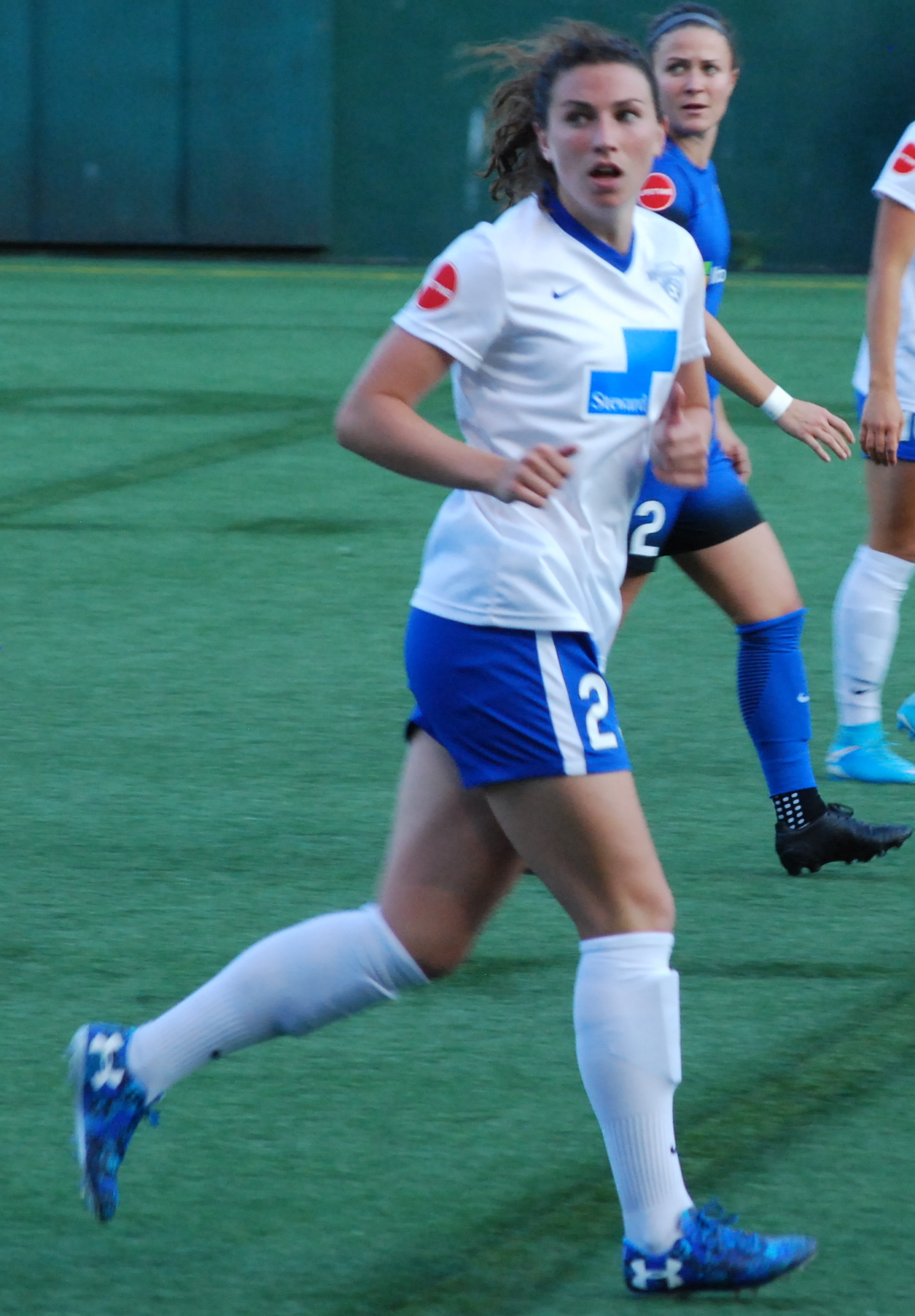
Morgan Andrews was the first player to win the award multiple times.

Male Soccer Player of the Year
Year	Winner	Hometown	College
1986	Kevin Hundelt	Hazelwood, MO	SIU Edwardsville
1987	John Gwin	Boise, ID	Duke
1988	Lyle Yorks	Storrs, CT	Virginia
1989	Chris Henderson	Everett, WA	UCLA
1990	Todd Haskins	Ellicott City, MD	North Carolina
1991	Claudio Reyna	Newark, NJ	Virginia
1992	Matt McKeon	St. Louis, MO	Saint Louis
1993	Mike Fisher	Batavia, IL	Virginia
1994	Andriy Shapowal	Chagrin Falls, OH	Virginia
1995	Pierre Venditti	Milford, CT	Maryland
1996	Andy Kirk	Milwaukee, WI	Maryland
1997	Nick Garcia	Dallas, TX	Indiana
1998	Nick Downing	Redmond, WA	Maryland
1999	Kyle Martino	Westport, CT	Virginia
2000	Alecko Eskandarian	Oradell, NJ	Virginia
2001	Ned Grabavoy	New Lenox, IL	Indiana
2002	Jordan Harvey	Mission Viejo, CA	UCLA
2003	Greg Dalby	Poway, CA	Notre Dame
2004	Patrick Phelan	Wilbraham, MA	Wake Forest
2005	Lee Nguyen	Plano, TX	Indiana
2006	Eric Alexander	Portage, MI	Indiana
2007	Brayan Martinez	West Orange, NJ	Seton Hall
2008	Chris Agorsor	Severn, MD	Virginia
2009	Dillon Powers	Plano, TX	Notre Dame
2010	Soony Saad	Dearborn, MI	Michigan
2011	Luis Rendon	Midlothian, VA	Duke
2012	Ema Boateng	Accra, Ghana	UC Santa Barbara
2013	Cristian Roldan	Pico Rivera, CA	Washington
2014	Abu Danladi	Takoradi, Ghana	UCLA
2015	Jack Harrison	Bolton, England	Wake Forest
2016	Lucas Mendes	Arlington, VA	Virginia
2017	Umar Farouk Osman	Tamale, Ghana	Michigan
2018	Ousseni Bouda	Millbrook, NY	Stanford
2019	Omar Hernandez	Dalton, GA	Wake Forest
2020	Jony Muñoz	Olathe, KS	Liberty / UMKC / MidAmerica Nazarene University
2021	Bryce Boneau	Keller, TX	Notre Dame
2022	Jacob Murrell	Baltimore, MD	Georgetown
2023	Ransford Gyan	Newark, NJ	Clemson
2024	Ransford Gyan	Newark, NJ	Clemson
2025	Dan Klink	Monkton, MD	North Carolina
2026	Marcus Jackson	West Orange, NJ	UCLA

Female Soccer Player of the Year
Year	Winner	Hometown	College
1998	Aly Wagner	San Jose, CA	Santa Clara
1999	Christie Welsh	Massapequa, NY	Penn State
2000	Aleisha Cramer	Lakewood, CO	BYU
2001	Mary McDowell	Lakewood, CO	North Carolina
2002	Jill Oakes	West Hills, CA	UCLA
2003	Heather O'Reilly	East Brunswick, NJ	North Carolina
2004	Ashlyn Harris	Satellite Beach, FL	North Carolina
2005	Amy Rodriguez	Rancho Santa Margarita, CA	USC
2006	Lauren Cheney	Indianapolis, IN	UCLA
2007	Melissa Henderson	Garland, TX	Notre Dame
2008	Teresa Noyola	Palo Alto, CA	Stanford
2009	Rachel Quon	Lake Forest, IL	Stanford
2010	Mollie Pathman	Durham, NC	Duke
2011	Morgan Brian	St. Simons Island, GA	Virginia
2012	Morgan Andrews	Milford, NH	Notre Dame
2013	Morgan Andrews	Milford, NH	Notre Dame
2014	Katie Cousins	Forest, VA	Tennessee
2015	Mallory Pugh	Highlands Ranch, CO	UCLA
2016	Ella Stevens	Loganville, GA	Duke
2017	Kennedy Wesley	Cerritos, CA	Stanford
2018	Izzy D'Aquila	San Juan Capistrano, CA	Santa Clara
2019	Sophia Jones	Atherton, CA	Duke
2020	Emily Mason	Flemington, NJ	Rutgers
2021	Alyssa Thompson	Studio City, CA	Did not attend
2022	Riley Jackson	Roswell, GA	Did not attend
2023	Kennedy Fuller	Southlake, TX	Did not attend
2024	Maddie DiMaria	St. Louis, MO	North Carolina
2025	Addison Halpern	Somerset, NJ	Virginia
2026	Maddie DiMaria	St. Louis, MO	North Carolina

=== Softball ===
Year	Winner	Hometown	College
1998	Amanda Freed	Cypress, CA	UCLA
1999	Maureen LeCocq	West Hills, CA	Stanford
2000	Tia Bollinger	Santa Ana, CA	Washington
2001	Cat Osterman	Cypress, TX	Texas
2002	Alicia Hollowell	Fairfield, CA	Arizona
2003	Lisa Dodd	San Diego, CA	UCLA
2004	Anjelica Selden	Fairfield, CA	UCLA
2005	Dani Hofer	Palm Harbor, FL	LSU
2006	Kirsten Shortridge	Keller, TX	Baylor
2007	Ashley Brignac	River Ridge, LA	Louisiana-Lafayette
2008	Kenzie Fowler	Oro Valley, AZ	Arizona
2009	Kenzie Fowler	Oro Valley, AZ	Arizona
2010	Kasey Fagan	Dunnellon, FL	Florida/Arkansas
2011	Paige McDuffee	The Woodlands, TX	UCLA
2012	Geri Ann Glasco	Watkinsville, GA	Georgia/Oregon
2013	Carley Hoover	Central, SC	Stanford/LSU
2014	Taylor McQuillin	Mission Viejo, CA	Arizona
2015	Rachel Garcia	Palmdale, CA	UCLA
2016	Bubba Nickles	Merced, CA	UCLA
2017	Taylor Dockins	Norco, CA	Cal State Fullerton
2018	Megan Faraimo	San Diego, CA	UCLA
2019	Kelley Lynch	Sharpsburg, GA	Washington
2020	Jayda Coleman	The Colony, TX	Oklahoma
2021	Jordy Bahl	Papillion, NE	Oklahoma
2022	Keagan Rothrock	Indianapolis, IN	Florida
2023	Ava Brown	Montgomery, TX	Florida
2024	Addisen Fisher	Bend, OR	UCLA
2025	Hannah Wells	Coahoma, TX	Texas
2026	Caroline Stanton	Buford, GA	Florida

=== Track and field ===
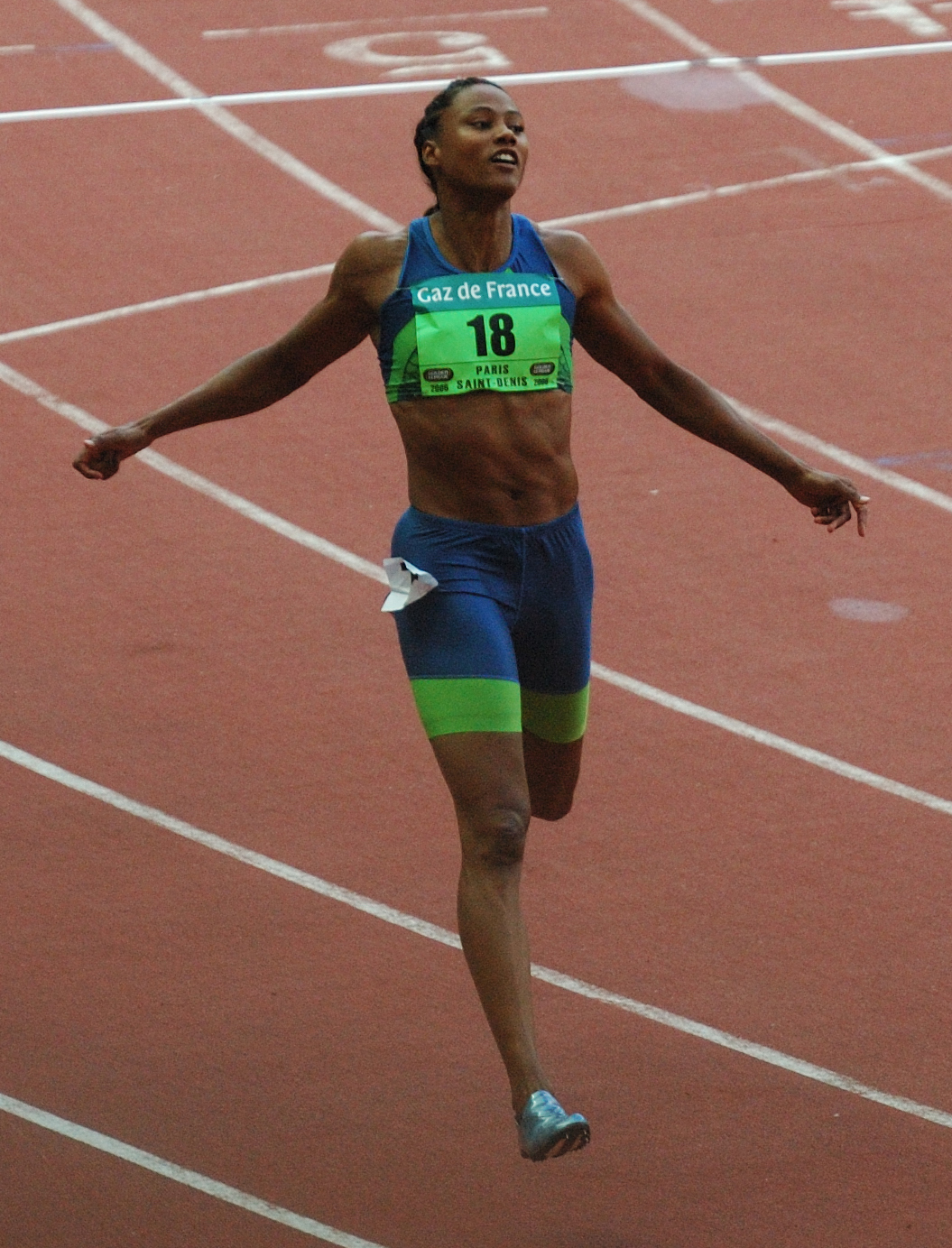
Marion Jones was the first three-time winner of the award in any sport.

Male Track and Field Athlete of the Year
Year	Winner	Hometown	College
1986	Eric Mastalir	Carmichael, CA	Stanford
1987	Kamy Keshmiri	Reno, NV	Nevada
1988	Art Skipper	Sandy, OR	Oregon
1989	Dion Bentley	Pittsburgh, PA	Florida
1990	Brent Noon	Fallbrook, CA	Georgia
1991	Bryan Bronson	Jasper, TX	Rice
1992	Sheddric Fields	Dallas, TX	Houston
1993	Charles Mitchell	Waco, TX	Mississippi State
1994	Andre Scott	Sanford, FL	Auburn
1995	Michael Stember	Sacramento, CA	Stanford
1996	Michael Granville	Bell Gardens, CA	UCLA
1997	Sharif Karie	Springfield, VA	Arkansas
1998	Jon Stevens	Fremont, CA	Stanford
1999	Jake Freeman	Warwick, RI	Manhattan
2000	Donald Sage	Elmhurst, IL	Stanford
2001	Alan Webb	Reston, VA	Michigan
2002	Brendan Christian	Austin, TX	Houston
2003	Kerron Clement	LaPorte, TX	Florida
2004	Jason Richardson	Cedar Hill, TX	South Carolina
2005	Ryan Whiting	Harrisburg, PA	Arizona State
2006	David Klech	San Ramon, CA	Oregon
2007	Bryshon Nellum	Los Angeles, CA	USC
2008	German Fernandez	Riverbank, CA	Oklahoma State
2009	Curtis Beach	Albuquerque, NM	Duke
2010	Sam Crouser	Gresham, OR	Oregon
2011	Gunnar Nixon	Edmond, OK	Arkansas
2012	Abraham Hall	Grand Prairie, TX	Army
2013	Trayvon Bromell	St. Petersburg, FL	Baylor
2014	Trentavis Friday	Cherryville, NC	Florida State
2015	Michael Norman	Murrieta, CA	USC
2016	Michael Norman	Murrieta, CA	USC
2017	Armand Duplantis	Lafayette, LA	LSU
2018	Anthony Schwartz	Plantation, FL	Auburn
2019	Matthew Boling	Houston, TX	Georgia
2020	Nico Young	Newbury Park, CA	Northern Arizona
2021	Hobbs Kessler	Ann Arbor, MI	Northern Arizona
2022	Cade Flatt	Benton, KY	Ole Miss
2023	Issam Asinga	Montverde, FL	Texas A&M
2024	Christian Miller	Saint Johns, FL	Georgia
2025	Tate Taylor	San Antonio, TX	
2026	Zacchaeus Brocks	Novi, MI	Ohio State

Female Track and Field Athlete of the Year
Year	Winner	Hometown	College
1986	Yolanda Johnson	Denver, CO	Colorado
1987	Janeene Vickers	Pomona, CA	UCLA
1988	Chryste Gaines	Dallas, TX	Stanford
1989	Angela Burnham	Oxnard, CA	UCLA
1990	Melissa Weis	Bakersfield, CA	Cal St.-Bakersfield
1991	Marion Jones	Oxnard, CA	North Carolina (track and basketball)
1992	Marion Jones	Thousand Oaks, CA	North Carolina (track and basketball)
1993	Marion Jones	Thousand Oaks, CA	North Carolina (track and basketball)
1994	Suzy Powell	Modesto, CA	UCLA
1995	Joanna Hayes	Riverside, CA	UCLA
1996	Kim Mortensen	Thousand Oaks, CA	UCLA
1997	Kinshasa Davis	Carson, CA	USC
1998	Angela Williams	Chino, CA	USC
1999	Stacy Martin	Ellettsville, IN	Auburn
2000	Monique Henderson	San Diego, CA	UCLA
2001	Ychlindria Spears	Luling, TX	Texas
2002	Sanya Richards	Fort Lauderdale, FL	Texas
2003	Allyson Felix	North Hills, CA	USC
2004	Shalonda Solomon	Inglewood, CA	South Carolina
2005	Brittany Daniels	Tracy, CA	Tennessee
2006	Bianca Knight	Ridgeland, MS	Texas
2007	Emily Pendleton	Lindsey, OH	Michigan
2008	Chanelle Price	Easton, PA	Tennessee
2009	Anna Jelmini	Shafter, CA	Arizona State
2010	Ashton Purvis	Oakland, CA	Miami (FL)
2011	Amy Weissenbach	Studio City, CA	Stanford
2012	Shelbi Vaughan	Mansfield, TX	Texas A&M
2013	Kendell Williams	Marietta, GA	Georgia
2014	Raven Saunders	Charleston, SC	Southern Illinois
2015	Candace Hill	Conyers, GA	Did not attend
2016	Sydney McLaughlin	Dunellen, NJ	Kentucky
2017	Sydney McLaughlin	Dunellen, NJ	Kentucky
2018	Katelyn Tuohy	Thiells, NY	NC State
2019	Jasmine Moore	Mansfield, TX	Georgia
2020	Taylor Ewert	Beavercreek, OH	Arkansas
2021	Sydney Thorvaldson	Rawlins, WY	Arkansas
2022	Juliette Whittaker	Catonsville, MD	Stanford
2023	Angelina Napoleon	Allegany, NY	NC State
2024	Sadie Engelhardt	Ventura, CA	NC State
2025	Jane Hedengren	Provo, UT	BYU
2026	Melanie Doggett	Fairburn, GA	

=== Volleyball ===
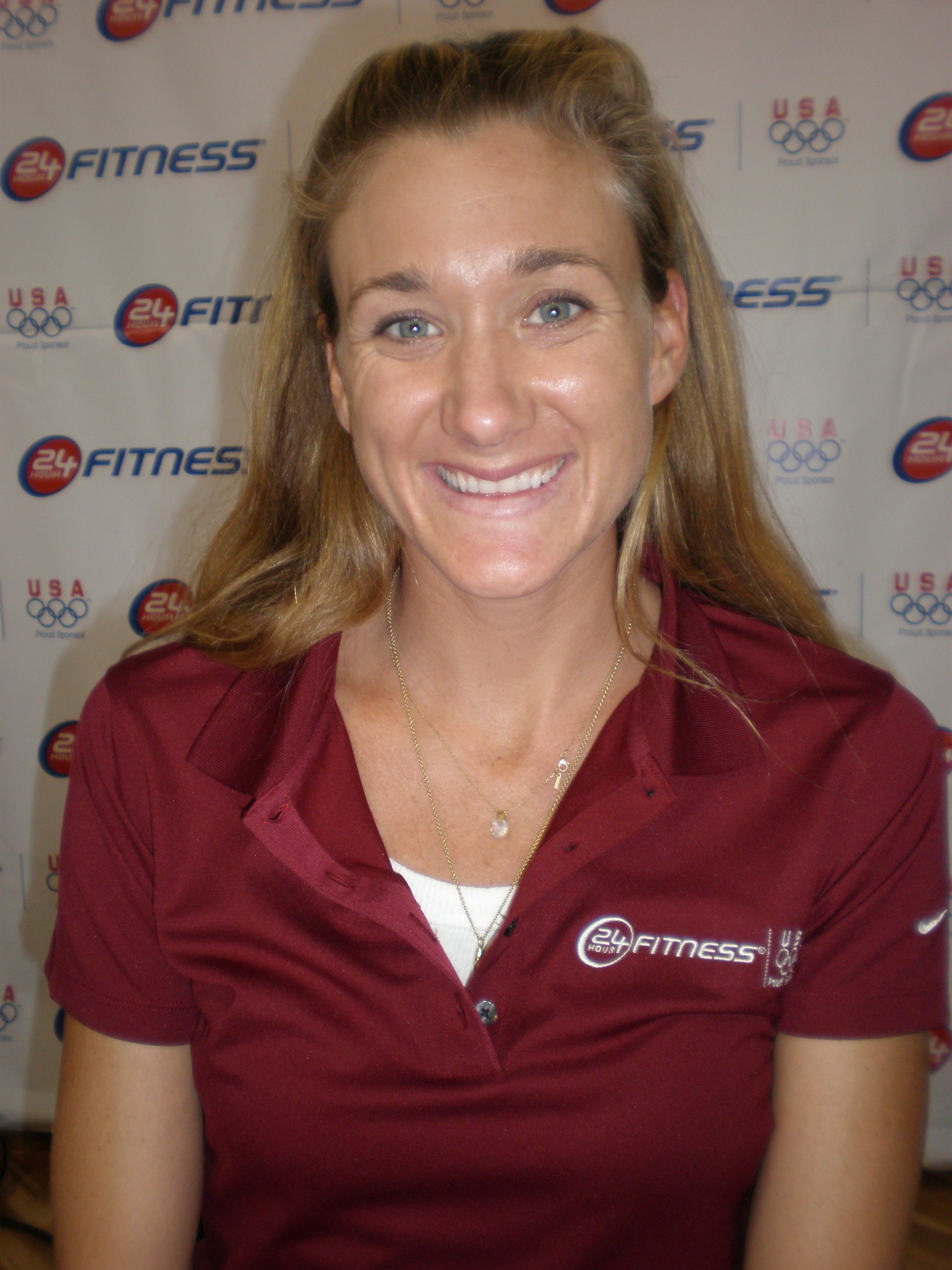
Kerri Walsh was the first winner of the award.

Year	Winner	Hometown	College
1996	Kerri Walsh	San Jose, CA	Stanford
1997	Denise Boylan	Lisle, IL	Notre Dame
1998	Sara Sandrik	Pelham, AL	Stanford
1999	Logan Tom	Salt Lake City, UT	Stanford
2000	April Ross	Newport Beach, CA	USC
2001	Ogonna Nnamani	Bloomington, IL	Stanford
2002	Bre Ladd	Tucson, AZ	Arizona
2003	Kristin Richards	Orem, UT	Stanford
2004	Cynthia Barboza	Long Beach, CA	Stanford
2005	Cynthia Barboza	Long Beach, CA	Stanford
2006	Megan Hodge	Durham, NC	Penn State
2007	Alix Klineman	Manhattan Beach, CA	Stanford
2008	Kelly Murphy	Wilmington, IL	Florida
2009	Gina Mancuso	Papillion, NE	Nebraska
2010	Ashley Wittman	Shakopee, MN	Minnesota
2011	Krista Vansant	Redlands, CA	Washington
2012	Jordan Burgess	Tampa, FL	Stanford
2013	Lauren Carlini	Aurora, IL	Wisconsin
2014	Alexa Filley	Louisville, KY	Auburn
2015	Mikaela Foecke	West Point, IA	Nebraska
2016	Khalia Lanier	Phoenix, AZ	USC
2017	Lexi Sun	Solana Beach, CA	Texas/Nebraska
2018	Thayer Hall	Roebuck, SC	Florida
2019	Ellie Holzman	New Orleans, LA	Illinois
2020	Jess Mruzik	Livonia, MI	Michigan/Penn State
2021	Ally Batenhorst	Katy, TX	Nebraska/USC
2022	Averi Carlson	Lucas, TX	Baylor/Texas/ SMU
2023	Harper Murray	Ann Arbor, MI	Nebraska
2024	Ayden Ames	Prosper, TX	Texas/Creighton
2025	Campbell Flynn	Farmington, MI	Nebraska
2026	Sophee Peterson	Trophy Club, TX	Texas A&M

== State winners ==
Notable state winners include Sam Hurley, who won for men's track and field in Arkansas in 2021. See (Note: For the official list of state winners (including D.C.) from 1985 to the present, see)

== See also ==
- Wendy's High School Heisman (student-athletes in various sports)
- National High School Hall of Fame
- Naismith Prep Player of the Year Award
- Mr. Basketball USA
- List of U.S. high school basketball national player of the year awards
- List of sports awards honoring women
