= National Conference (California) =

National Conference is one of the three conferences of the CIF Northern Section, a high school athletics governing body part of the California Interscholastic Federation. The conference is divided into four leagues.

== Members ==
Institution	Location	Colors	Established	Enrollment	Team name	Joined	Rival
Anderson Union High School	Anderson		1909	700	Cubs	-	West Valley High School
Central Valley High School	Shasta Lake		-	800	Falcons	-	-
Chico High School	Chico		1902	2,075	Panthers	-	Pleasant Valley High School
Corning High School	Corning		-	-	Cardinals	-	-
Enterprise High School	Redding		-	1,200	Hornets	-	Shasta High School
Foothill High School	Palo Cedro		-	1,900	Cougars	-	-
Gridley High School	Gridley		1895	675	Bulldogs	-	-
Las Plumas High School	Oroville		1960	1,325	Thunderbirds	-	Oroville High School
Lassen Union High School	Susanville		1903	900	Grizzlies	-	-
Orland High School	Orland		-	675	Trojans	-	-
Oroville High School	Oroville		1892	-	Tigers	-	Las Plumas High School
Paradise High School	Paradise		-	-	Bobcats	-	-
Pleasant Valley High School	Chico		1964	1,975	Vikings	-	Chico High School
Red Bluff High School	Red Bluff		<1930	1,725	Spartans	-	-
Shasta High School	Redding		1889	1,600	Wolves	-	Enterprise High School
Sutter Union High School	Sutter		1893	700	Huskies	-	-
University Preparatory School	Redding		2004	900	Panthers	-	-
West Valley High School	Cottonwood		1981	900	Eagles	-	Anderson Union High School
Wheatland High School	Wheatland		1907	700	Pirates	-	-
Yreka High School	Yreka		1893	-	Miners	-	-

== Leagues ==
- Sac River
- EAL
- NAL
- BVL
