= Nova High School (Redding, California) =

Location
- Redding, California; 40.58724°N 122.40502°W

Information
- Closed: 1991

Nova High School was a public high school based in Redding, California. It was a part of the Shasta Union High School District (along with Shasta High School, Enterprise High School and Central Valley High School) from 1967 until it closed in 1991. The school was located at 2200 Eureka Way in Redding, where the school district offices are now located. It was replaced by Foothill High School, which would make the Eureka Way building their own until they relocated to their current campus in Palo Cedro, California, in 1999. Since 2004, 2200 Eureka Way has been home to University Preparatory School.

Nova was a 9th grade only school from 1967 until 1991. It was a novel experiment that took the 9th grade students (their freshman year) from Shasta HS, Enterprise HS, and Central Valley HS, and brought them all together for one school year. After the completion of the 9th grade, all the students returned to their geographical high schools for their 10th thru 12th grade school years. Many of the former students still attend annual reunions, which is unique for a 9th grade school class.
