= John Strohmayer =

American baseball player (1946–2019)

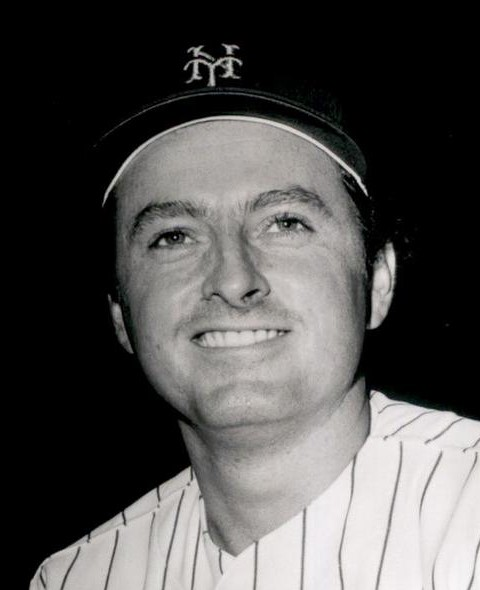
- Pitcher
- Born: October 13, 1946; Belle Fourche, South Dakota, U.S.
- Died: November 28, 2019 (aged 73); Redding, California, U.S.
- Batted: Right Threw: Right

MLB debut
- April 29, 1970, for the Montreal Expos

Last MLB appearance
- September 14, 1974, for the New York Mets

MLB statistics
- Win–loss record: 11–9
- Earned run average: 4.47
- Strikeouts: 200
- Stats at Baseball Reference

Teams
- Montreal Expos (1970–1973); New York Mets (1973–1974)

John Emery Strohmayer (October 13, 1946 – November 28, 2019) was an American professional pitcher in Major League Baseball. He was drafted by the Oakland Athletics in 1968, and made his Major League debut in 1970 for the Montreal Expos. He played with them until July 1973, when he was claimed by the New York Mets off waivers. He played with them through 1974.

Strohmayer had a career 11–9 win–loss record with a 4.47 earned run average and 200 strikeouts.

In 1989 Strohmayer was inducted to the Pacific Athletics Hall of Fame for his outstanding performance with the Pacific Tigers.

After retiring from baseball due to a shoulder injury, Strohmayer went back to school and obtained a degree in education. He taught at Central Valley High School in the Gateway Unified School District, in Redding, California, from 1976 to 1991, then he became assistant principal for 6 years and then was principal of the High School for 4 years.

He was recognized as coach of the year for leading Central Valley High School to their first First State Championship (Division III) in Basketball in March 1989.

Central Valley High School is the same high school which he graduated from before starting his baseball career. In 2002, he became Superintendent of the Gateway Unified School District. He retired in 2009 after 32 years in education.

Strohmayer was one of 15 employees of the Gateway Unified School District to share in a $76 million lottery jackpot in 2009.

Strohmayer died on November 28, 2019, in Redding, California.
