= Nicole Teter =

American middle-distance runner (born 1973)

Personal information
- Nationality: United States
- Born: 8 November 1973 (age 53) San Diego, California, U.S.
- Height: 1.70 m (5 ft 7 in)
- Weight: 57 kg (126 lb)

Sport
- Sport: Athletics
- Event: Middle distance running
- College team: Arkansas Razorbacks
- Club: Oregon Track Club
- Turned pro: 1994
- Coached by: Frank Gagliano
- Retired: 2012

Achievements and titles
- Personal bests: 800 m: 1:57.97 (2002); 1500 m: 4:04.19 (2002)
Medal record
Women's athletics
Representing United States
Pan American Junior Athletics Championships
Silver medal – second place	1991 Kingston	800 m

Nicole Teter (born November 8, 1973, in San Diego, California) is an American middle distance runner, who specialized in the 800 metres. She is a three-time U.S. indoor champion (2002, 2003, and 2008), and a two-time Olympian (2004 and 2008). She also won a gold medal in the same category at the 2002 U.S. Outdoor Championships.

== Career ==
In 1991, Teter won the CIF California State Meet, then the 800 meters at the US Junior Championships and won the silver medal at the Junior Pan American Games in the same event. Enrolled and competing in track and field at the University of Arkansas, she finished second in the 800 meters at the 1992 Southeastern Conference Indoor Track and Field Championships.

Teter, a native of San Diego, California, catapulted into the national spotlight, when she claimed her first ever career senior title, and set an American record of 1:58.71, for the 800 metres, at the 2002 U.S. Indoor Track & Field championships. Teter also won the U.S. outdoor title in the same distance, and ran a personal best time of 1:57.97 at the Athletissima track meet in Lausanne, Switzerland. Following her early successes from the U.S. championships, Teter made her international debut at the DN Galan in Stockholm, Sweden, where she defeated former Olympic and world champion Maria Mutola of Mozambique, by one tenth of a second (0.10), in the 800 metres, with a time of 1:58.13.

Two years after her breakthrough season, Teter qualified for the women's 800 metres at the 2004 Summer Olympics in Athens, by placing second from the U.S. Olympic Trials. She finished the fifth heat in third place by thirty-five hundredths of a second (0.35) behind Spain's Mayte Martínez, and clocked a preliminary time of 2:01.16 to advance into the semi-finals. Teter, however, fell short in her bid for the eight-woman final, when she placed fourth in the second round, with a time of 1:59.50.

Shortly after her first Olympics, Teter continued to build her success by winning numerous track meets across Europe and the United States, although she had battled back each time from injuries. In 2006, she took a year off from running to undergo a sports hernia surgery in Atlanta, Georgia. In January 2007, she relocated to Eugene, Oregon, to resume working with her coach Frank Gagliano, and later became a member of a newly established, Nike-sponsored Oregon Track Club (OTC) Elite.

In 2008, Teter returned to the international scene by winning again the U.S. indoor championship title, and qualified for the 800 metres at the 2008 IAAF World Indoor Championships in Valencia, Spain, where she made only into the semi-final round. Teter also finished fourth in the same distance at the U.S. Olympic Trials in Eugene, Oregon, with a time of 2:01.30. However, she earned a spot on her second United States team for the Olympics, when third-place runner Kameisha Bennett did not have an A-standard of 2:00.00 or better.

At the 2008 Summer Olympics in Beijing, Teter competed for the second time in the women's 800 metres, along with her teammates Hazel Clark and Alice Schmidt. She ran in the fourth heat against six other athletes, including former Olympic and world champion Maria Mutola. Having suffered from an Achilles tendon rupture (lower left leg strain), Teter pulled up a quarter of the first lap, and subsequently, did not finish the race.

== Personal life ==
Teter was born in San Diego, California, but she grew up in Cottonwood, CA for her entire life and attended West Valley High School in Cottonwood. She married runner Andy Downin. They have two kids and live outside Boston, MA.
