= Chico Unified School District =

School district in California, United States

Location
- 1163 E Seventh St; Chico, California 95928 United States

District information
- Superintendent: Gregory Blake

Other information
- Website: www.chicousd.org

Chico Unified School District (CUSD) is a public school district in Butte County, California, serving the city of Chico and the surrounding unincorporated communities.

The current superintendent is Gregory Blake, replacing Kelly Staley, who retired in November, 2024.

== High schools ==
- Chico High School
- Fair View High School
- Pleasant Valley High School
- inspire school of arts and sciences

== Middle schools ==
- Bidwell Junior High School
- Chico Junior High School
- Marsh Junior High School

== Elementary schools ==
- Chapman Elementary School
- Citrus Elementary School
- Emma Wilson Elementary School
- Hooker Oak Elementary School
- Little Chico Creek Elementary School
- Marigold Elementary School
- McManus Elementary School
- Neal Dow Elementary School
- Parkview Elementary School
- Rosedale Elementary School
- Shasta Elementary School
- Sierra View Elementary School

== Other ==
- Academy for Change
- Loma Vista Early Learning Center
- Oak Bridge Academy
- Oakdale
