= Shasta Union High School District =

School district in California

Address
- 2200 Eureka Way Redding, California, 96001; United States
- Coordinates: 40.589°N 122.410°W

District information
- Type: Public school district
- Grades: 6–12
- Established: 1899; 127 years ago
- Superintendent: Jim Cloney
- NCES District ID: 0636600

Students and staff
- Enrollment: 4,247 (2020–2021)
- Teachers: 200.7 (FTE)
- Staff: 233.96 (FTE)
- Student–teacher ratio: 21.16:1

Other information
- Website: www.suhsd.net

Shasta Union High School District is a high school district in Redding, California. It serves all the high schools in Redding and its surrounding areas. Shasta Union High School District was first established in 1899.

On May 6, 2009, a county court judge ruled that Shasta Union High School District had to stop drug testing of students in non-athletic extracurricular activities, such as school band and debate club.

Dr. O. Crosby is the current superintendent of schools. He replaced Jim Cloney who was the superintendent for 17 years (2008-2025). Leo (Poldo) Perez, the former principal at Shasta High School, is in his 5th year as Associate Superintendent, having replaced Milan Woollard, another former Shasta principal. Jason Rubin, formerly of Gateway Unified is in his 8th year in charge of human resources, J. David Flores, formerly of Grant Elementary School is in his 16th year as Chief Business Officer.

== Schools ==
=== Current high schools ===
- Enterprise High School - Mr. C.R. Johnson is the principal
- Foothill High School - Mr. K. Greene is the principal
- Shasta High School - Mr. G.H. Bunton is the principal
- University Preparatory School - Ms. R. Angley is the superintendent/principal.

=== Other active schools ===
- Shasta Adult School
- Shasta Charter Academy
- Shasta Collegiate Academy
- Freedom High School (Community Day)
- Pioneer High School (Continuation)
- Northstate Independence High School (Independent Study)
- Shasta Home School

=== Defunct schools ===
- Bishop Quinn High School
- Nova High School
