= Colin Barber (baseball) =

American baseball player (born 2000)

Free agent
- Outfielder
- Born: December 4, 2000 (age 25); Paradise, California, U.S.
- Bats: Left Throws: Left

Colin Arthur Barber (born December 4, 2000) is an American professional baseball outfielder who is a free agent.

== Amateur career ==
Barber grew up in Chico, California, and attended Pleasant Valley High School. After breaking his leg early in his sophomore season, he batted .449 with 29 RBIs as a junior. As a senior, Barber batted .493 with 10 home runs and 42 RBIs. Barber committed to play college baseball at the University of Oregon.

== Professional career ==
Barber was selected in the fourth round of the 2019 Major League Baseball draft by the Houston Astros. He signed with the team and received a $1 million bonus. Barber was assigned to the Rookie League Gulf Coast League Astros and batted .263 with two home runs and 19 runs scored in 28 games played. After the 2020 minor league season was cancelled, he played in the temporary independent City of Champions Cup for the Chicago Deep Dish. In 2021, he appeared in 16 games for the Asheville Tourists of the High-A East before undergoing season-ending shoulder surgery.

Barber split the 2022 campaign between the rookie-level Florida Complex League Astros and Asheville, batting a combined .294/.400/.439 with seven home runs, 33 RBI, and seven stolen bases. He spent the 2023 season with the Double-A Corpus Christi Hooks, slashing .244/.358/.433 with 11 home runs, 40 RBI, and five stolen bases across 79 games. Barber made 70 appearances for Corpus Christi during the 2024 campaign, hitting .222/.287/.353 with eight home runs, 27 RBI, and four stolen bases.

In 2025, Barber made 101 appearances for the Double-A Corpus Christi Hooks and Triple-A Sugar Land Space Cowboys, batting a cumulative .212/.295/.341 with six home runs and 33 RBI. He elected free agency following the season on November 6, 2025.
