= Gateway Unified School District =

School district in California

Address
- 4411 Mountain Lakes Boulevard Redding, California, 96003; United States

District information
- Type: Public
- Grades: K–12
- NCES District ID: 0614950

Students and staff
- Students: 2,184 (2020–2021)
- Teachers: 108.5 (FTE)
- Staff: 176.21 (FTE)
- Student–teacher ratio: 20.13:1

Other information
- Website: gatewayusd.org

Gateway Unified School District is a school district in the north side of Redding, California. Gateway has one elementary school, two K-8 schools, and two high schools. Kyle Turner is the current superintendent.

The following are schools in this district:

- Buckeye School of the Arts
- Central Valley High School
- Shasta Lake School
- Mountain Lakes High School
- Grand Oaks Elementary School
- Rocky Point Charter School
