= Pleasant Valley High School (California) =

School in Chico, California, United States

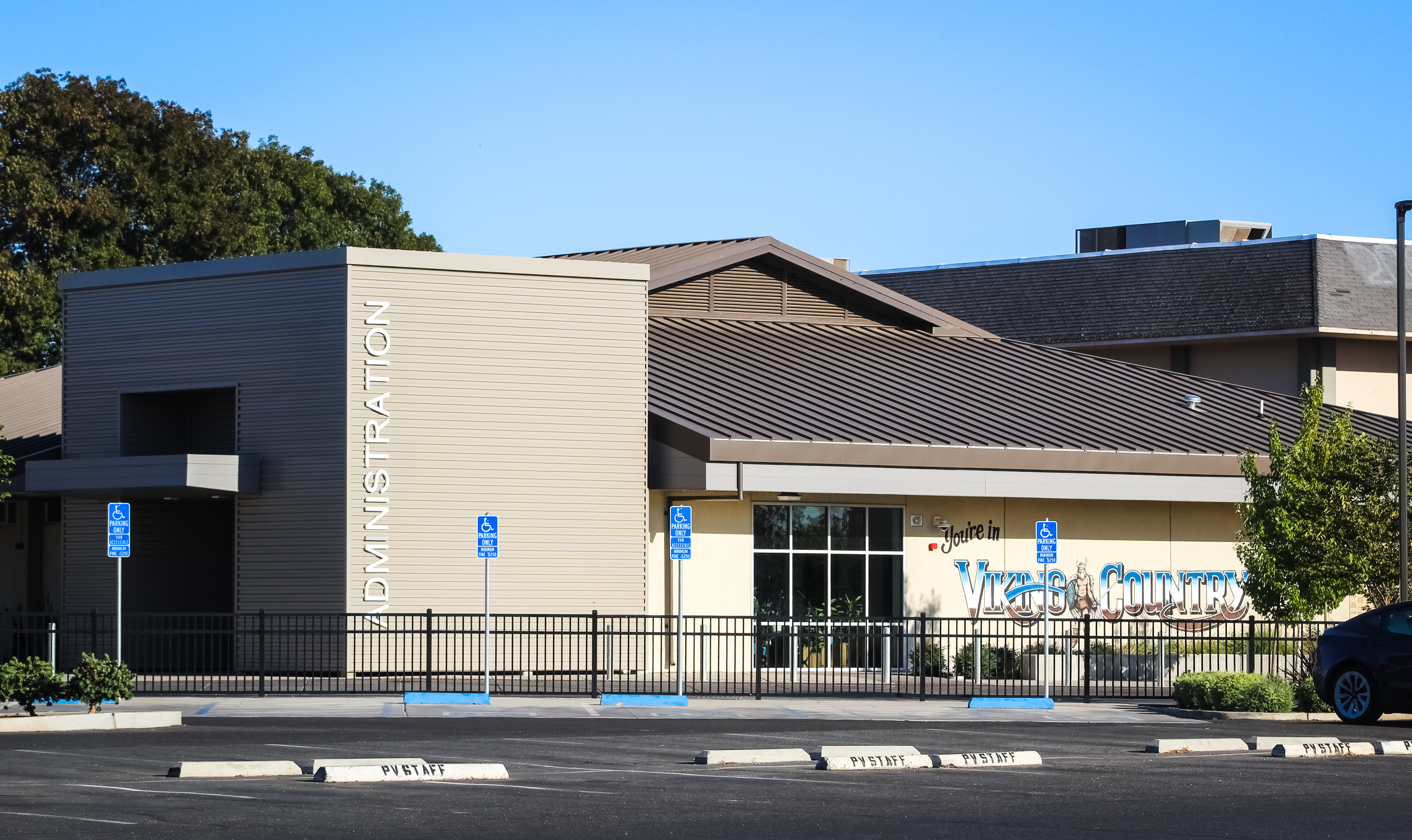

Location
- 1475 East Avenue; Chico, Butte County, California 95926; United States; 39°45′39″N 121°49′0″W

Information
- Other names: Pleasant Valley; PVHS; PV
- Type: Public high school
- Established: 1965
- Status: Active
- Locale: City: Midsize (12)
- School board: California State Board of Education
- School district: Chico Unified School District
- NCES District ID: 0608370
- Superintendent: Kelly Staley
- Session: August–June
- CEEB code: 050548
- NCES School ID: 060837000827
- Principal: Damon Whittaker
- Teaching staff: 85.38 (on an FTE basis)
- Grades: 9–12
- Gender: Mixed-sex
- Enrollment: 1,922 (2023–2024)
- Student to teacher ratio: 22.51
- Schedule type: Alternate day block scheduling
- Campus type: Suburban
- Student government: Yes
- Colors: Navy blue, Columbia blue, and white
- Athletics: Yes
- Athletics conference: National Conference
- Sports: Boys' tennis, girls' tennis, football, swimming, boys' basketball, girls' basketball, field hockey, softball, boys' soccer, girls' soccer, wrestling, cross country, golf, boys' volleyball, girls' volleyball, skiing, snowboarding, baseball, track, marching band, and cheerleading.
- Mascot: A Viking
- Nickname: Vikings
- Rival: Chico High School
- Accreditation: Western Association of Schools and Colleges
- National ranking: 3,899
- Newspaper: The Saga
- Yearbook: Valkyrie
- Feeder schools: Bidwell Junior High School; Chico Junior High School; Marsh Junior High School
- Website: pvhs.chicousd.org

Pleasant Valley High School (commonly referred to as Pleasant Valley) is a public co-educational and comprehensive high school located in Chico, California teaching ninth grade through twelfth grade. It is the second largest school in the Chico Unified School District, which serves around 14,157 students.

== Academics ==
=== Advanced Placement ===
Pleasant Valley High School's available AP classes are AP English Language and Composition, AP English Literature and Composition, AP Seminar, AP World History, AP US History, AP Government, AP Macroeconomics, AP Psychology, AP Chemistry, AP Biology, AP Environmental Science, AP Calculus, AP Statistics, AP Spanish, online AP French, AP 2-D Art and Design, AP Drawing, and AP Computer Science Principles. Pleasant Valley offers the AP Capstone program and its respective diplomas and academic certificates.

=== International Baccalaureate Programme ===
Pleasant Valley used to offer the IB Diploma Programme; it provided the IB exams for English, Chemistry, Biology, History, French, Spanish, Japanese, Mathematics, and Theater Arts.

== Notable alumni ==
- Colin Barber – Major League Baseball outfielder for the Houston Astros organization, 2019 graduate
- Luke Barker – Major League Baseball pitcher for the Milwaukee Brewers, 2010 graduate
- Brian Cage – All Elite Wrestling professional wrestler, 2002 graduate
- Pat Clements – Major League Baseball player, 1980 graduate
- Brian Jones – Arena Football League player, 1999 graduate
- Evan MacLane – Major League Baseball player, 2001 graduate
- Aaron Rodgers – National Football League player, 2002 graduate
- Jordan Rodgers – American sports commentator and former National Football League player and The Bachelorette contestant, 2007 graduate
- Geoff Swaim – National Football League player, 2011 graduate
