= Matthew Kennedy (author) =

American writer, film historian, and anthropologist

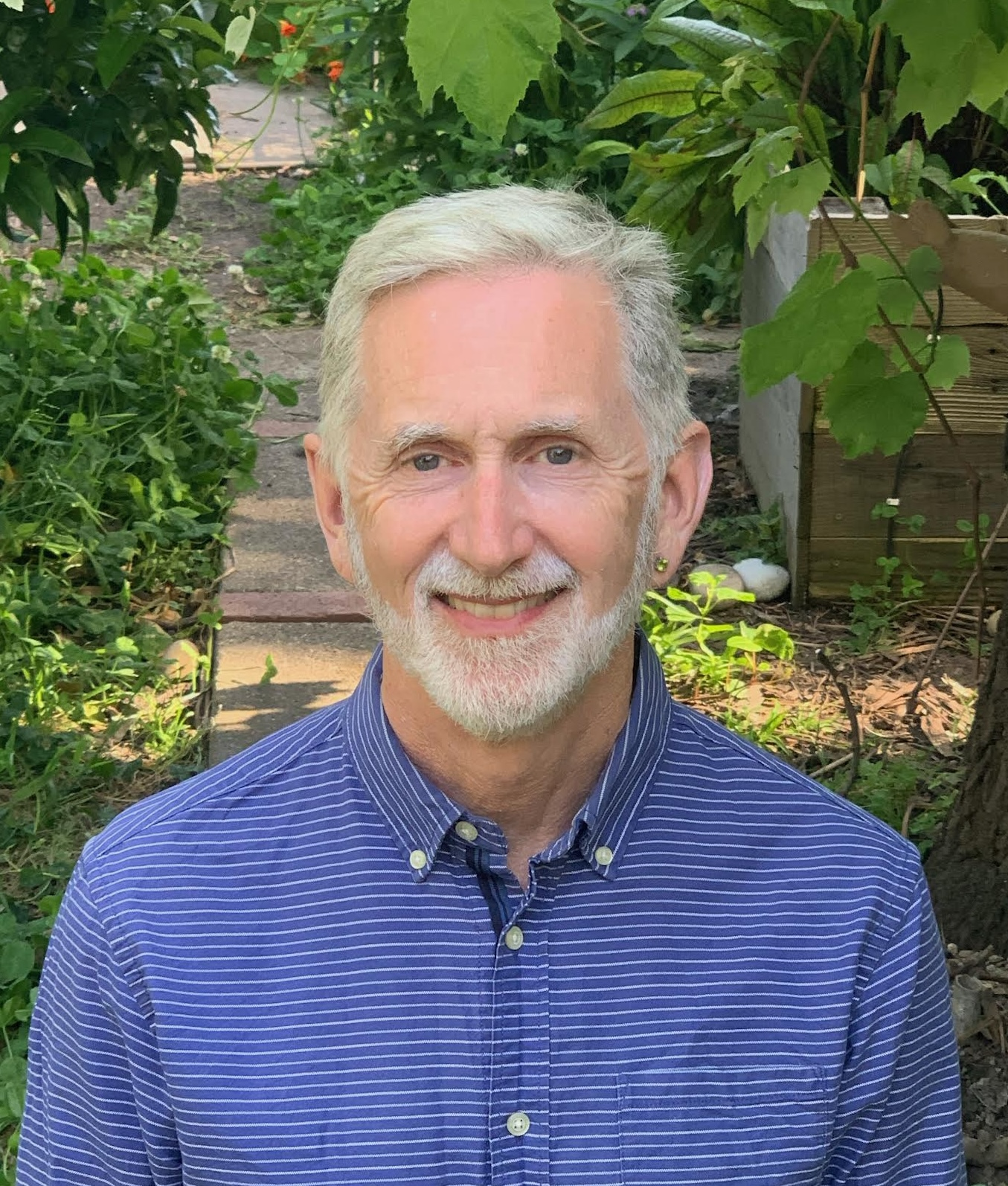
- Born: March 14, 1957 (age 69); Redding, California

Matthew Kennedy (born March 14, 1957) is an American film historian, author, host, and curator.

== Early life and education ==
Matthew Kennedy was born in Redding, California, attended Shasta High School, and the University of California, Los Angeles, graduating with a Bachelor of Arts in theater arts in 1979. Moving to San Francisco, he studied and performed with the Margaret Jenkins Dance Company, before moving to New York to study with choreographer Merce Cunningham and perform with Jonathon Apples + Company. After serving on the executive staff of the California Arts Council, he pursued graduate studies in anthropology at the University of California, Davis, where he was awarded a Fulbright research grant. Graduating with a Masters of Arts in 1992, the following year he joined the faculty in anthropology at City College of San Francisco, where he taught until 2017. From 2020 to 2025, he was host and curator of the CinemaLit Film Series (now Movies at Mechanics') of the San Francisco Mechanics' Institute.

== Writing ==
Kennedy's books include Marie Dressler: A Biography (1999), Edmund Goulding’s Dark Victory: Hollywood’s Genius Bad Boy with a foreword by Kevin Brownlow (2004), Joan Blondell: A Life between Takes (2007), Roadshow! The Fall of Film Musicals in the 1960s (2014), and On Elizabeth Taylor: An Opinionated Guide (2024). Kennedy narrated an audiobook version of On Elizabeth Taylor in 2025.

Kennedy’s books on film have received praise. He has received starred reviews from Publisher's Weekly, Booklist, and Library Journal. In reviewing Joan Blondell, film critic and historian Leonard Maltin wrote, "Kennedy is a genuinely good writer who knows the language as well as he does vintage Hollywood movies. This book gets my highest recommendation." The National Board of Review found Edmund Goulding's Dark Victory to be "a fascinating read," and linguist and political commentator John McWhorter reviewed Marie Dressler with "Bullseye! ... this book finally does this fabulous star justice with comprehensive research on her now-obscured early life; loving, intelligent coverage of all her extant films; savvy, well-written documentation of her stage career, and endlessly perceptive reconstruction of what Dressler was like as a human being.... Truly a bravura performance - Dressler lives again."

== Teaching and film series ==
Kennedy began teaching film history in 2004 at the San Francisco Conservatory of Music. He has written extensively about film in a number of publications, including The Gay & Lesbian Review Worldwide, Bay Area Reporter, San Francisco Chronicle, Performing Arts, the San Francisco Silent Film Festival and TCM Classic Film Festival program books, and the popular Bright Lights Film Journal. Honors include a Cable Car Award for Outstanding Critic and for his teaching has been named in Who's Who Among America's Teachers and Honors Faculty of the Year by the Northern California Bay Consortium. Kennedy was a contributing researcher for George Lucas’ Blockbusting, a film reference book published in 2010. His books have inspired film retrospectives on Turner Classic Movies and at the Museum of Modern Art, UCLA Film Archive, the Pacific Film Archive,, and the Palm Springs Cultural Center.

== Selected bibliography ==
- Marie Dressler: A Biography (1999)
- Strategies in Teaching Anthropology (first edition contributor) (2000)
- Edmund Goulding's Dark Victory: Hollywood's Genius Bad Boy (2004)
- The Queer Encyclopedia of Music, Dance & Musical Theater (contributor) (2004)
- The Queer Encyclopedia of Film and Television (contributor) (2005)
- Strategies in Teaching Anthropology (fourth edition contributor) (2006)
- Joan Blondell: A Life between Takes (2007)
- Roadshow! The Fall of Film Musicals in the 1960s (2014)
- On Elizabeth Taylor: An Opinionated Guide (2024)
