= West Valley High School (Cottonwood, California) =

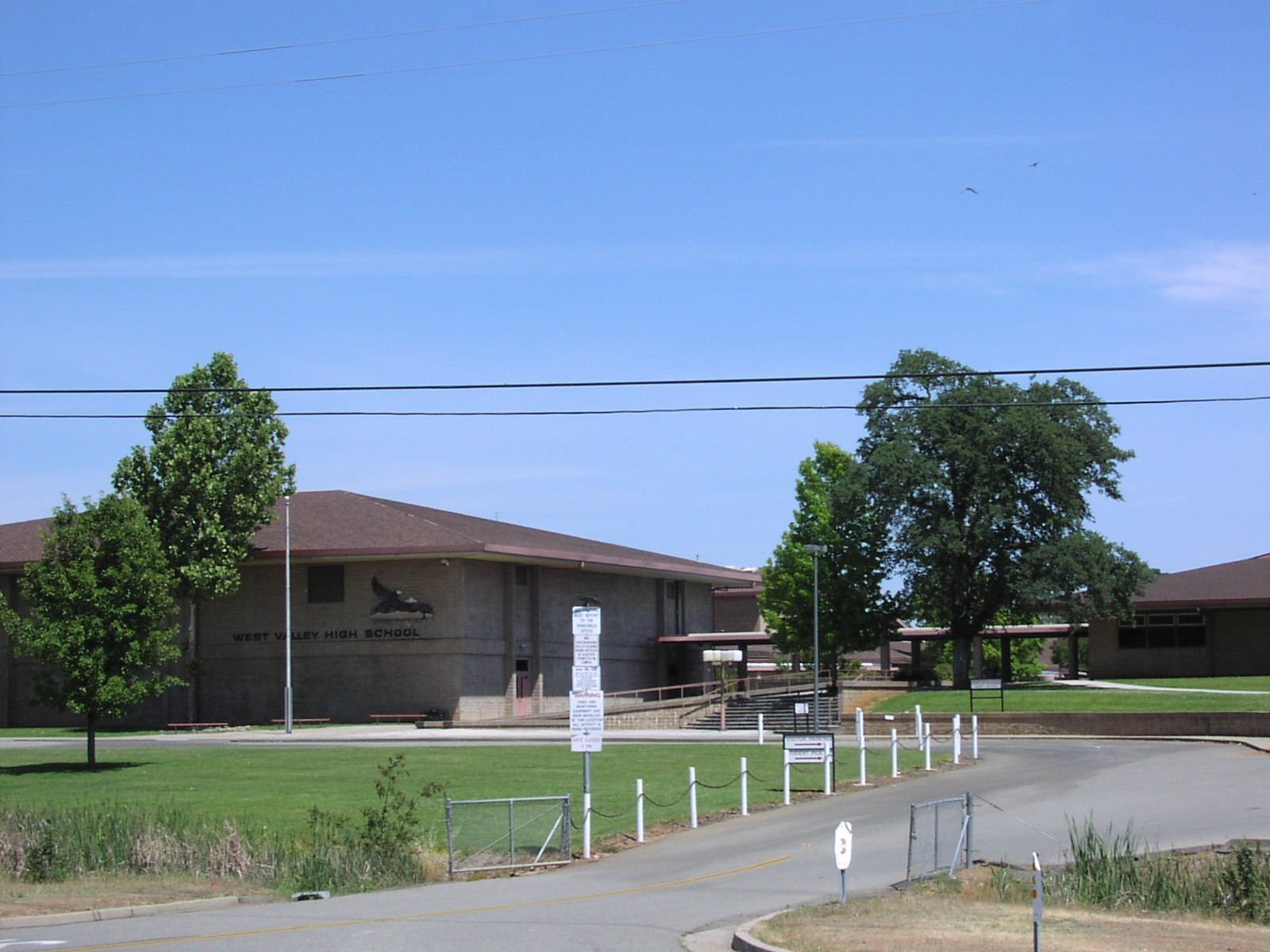

Location
- 3805 Happy Valley Road; Cottonwood, California 96022; United States; 40.39688°N 122.40535°W

Information
- Type: Public Secondary
- Established: 1981
- School district: Anderson Union High School District
- Principal: Niki Simonsen
- Teaching staff: 32.23 (FTE)
- Grades: 9–12
- Enrollment: 745 (2023-2024)
- Student to teacher ratio: 23.12
- Colors: Cardinal and gold
- Mascot: Eagle
- Yearbook: Aquila
- Website: www.wveagles.net

West Valley High School is an American high school located at 3805 Happy Valley Road, Cottonwood, California, 96022, 6.5 miles west of Interstate 5 near the intersection of Gas Point and Happy Valley Roads. The closest major city is Redding, California which is about fifteen miles north of the school. The school's mascot is the eagle.

West Valley is a small school of approximately 900 students. It is part of the Anderson Union High School District which is headed by superintendent Brian Parker. The district includes Anderson, Anderson New Technology, Oakview, North Valley, and West Valley High Schools.

The high school is a California distinguished school. It is also well known in the North State area for its athletic programs, and it's effort to maintain a drug-free and vape/cigarette-free campus.

== History ==
Before West Valley's opening in 1981, Anderson High School found itself unable to expand in size due to topographical constraints, and a new high school had to be built within the district. As a result, the Board of Education approved a tax override measure to be placed on the local ballot. The voters approved the measure, but because of the earlier passage of Proposition 13, special legislation in Sacramento had to be introduced and passed to allow for the tax levy to be utilized for a new school. The bill passed, and land was subsequently purchased through the state's power of eminent domain, and construction of a new high school in Cottonwood ensued.

West Valley High School was dedicated on October 1, 1981. At the dedication ceremony, the Honorable Richard B. Eaton, Shasta County Superior Court Judge, remarked:

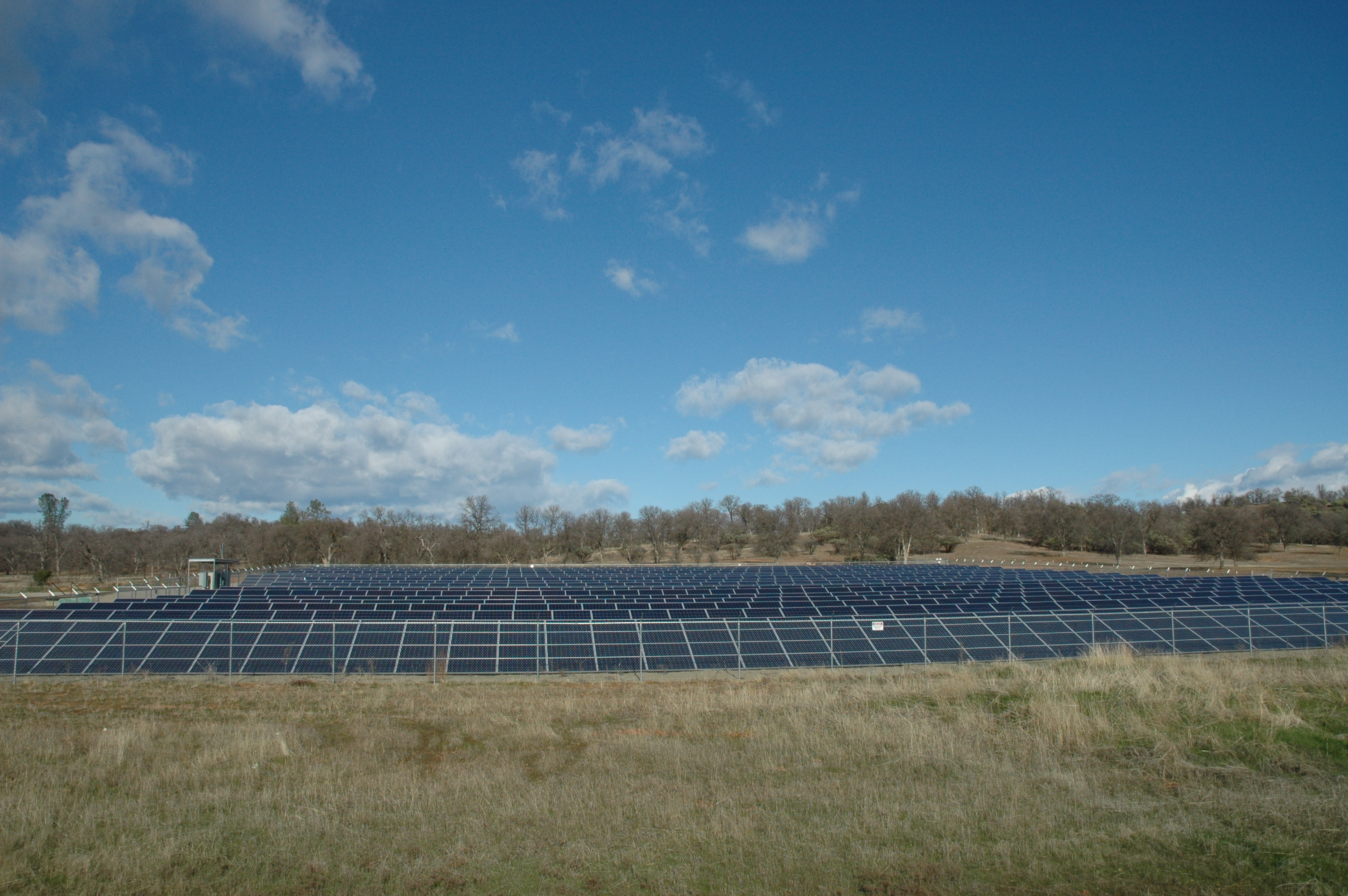
Photovoltaic System

"A younger generation can go forward only if it begins, not where its fathers began, but where they finished . . . . The public school presents, in effect, a conducted tour to the frontiers of present knowledge, after which the student must break his own trail into the unknown . . . . [It is] my high honor and privilege to dedicate West Valley High School . . . in the name of those goals to whose service a public school should most fittingly be dedicated . . . to truth, to freedom, and to equality."

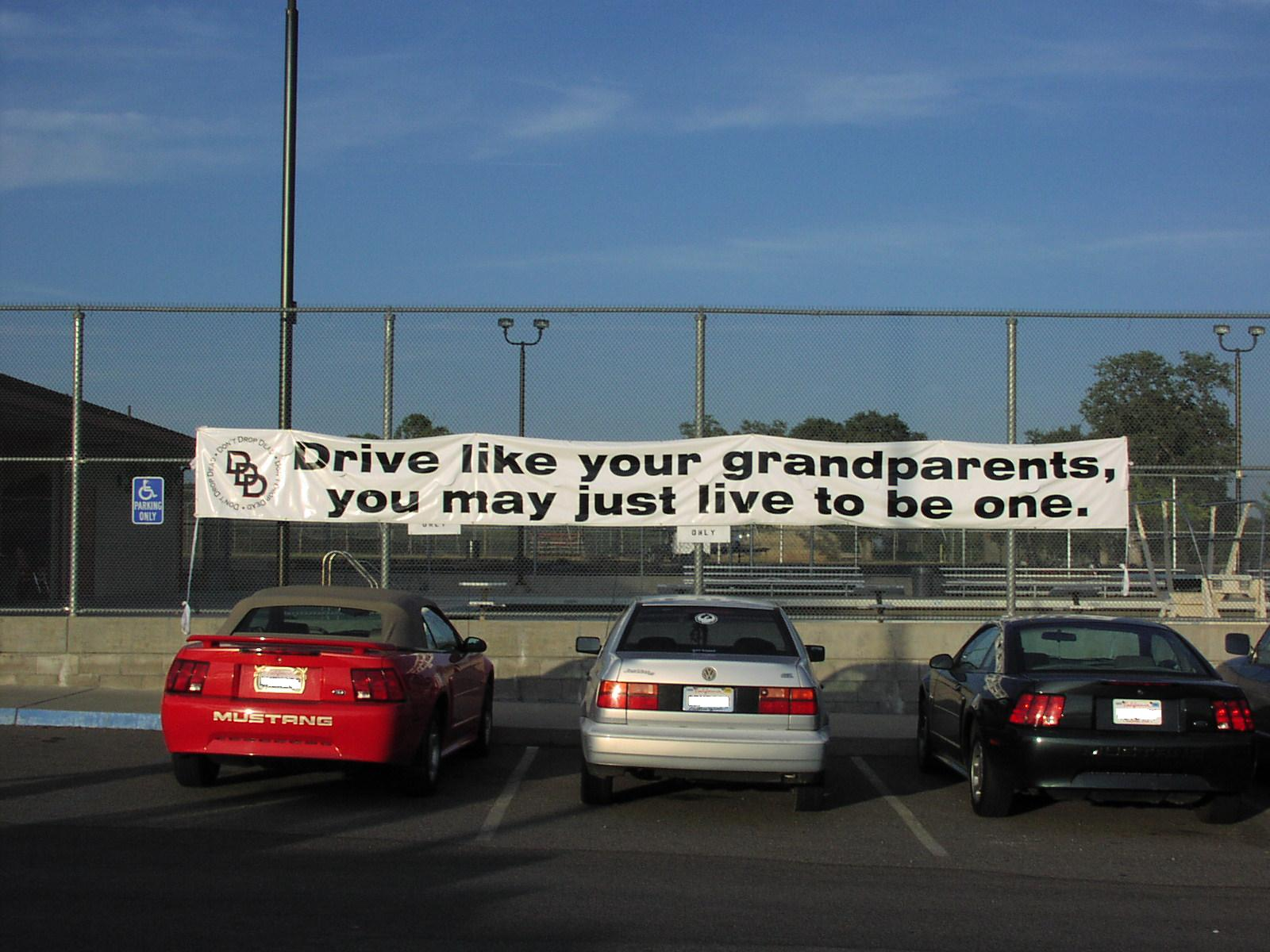
DUI Prevention Program

In the late-1980s and early 1990s, a performing arts center was built as well as an addition to the cafeteria. A few years later, a pool, satellite gymnasium, and another classroom wing were added to the campus. During the 2005–2006 school year, a photovoltaic system was installed in order to offset the energy costs in a very high-cost area of Shasta County.

During the 2003–2004 school year, West Valley gained notoriety for a series of vehicle related student deaths, two of which were alcohol-related. These tragic events inspired classmates to create a nationally recognized DUI prevention program.

=== List of principals ===
Principal	Years
Richard Pangburn	1981 – 1995
Lawrence Perry	1995 – 1999
Karl Stemmler	1999 – 2010
Emmett Koerperich	2011 – 2020
Joshua Mason	2020 – 2024
Justin Byxbe	2024 – 2026
Niki Simonsen	2026-

== Interesting facts ==
During West Valley's first year, it had no senior class. The students who would have comprised West Valley's senior class preferred instead to finish their high school education at Anderson High School.

The first varsity football coach was Lewis Ayotte. Local legend has it that he chose the cardinal and gold colors because he was a longtime fan of the University of Southern California. This may have kept with a district Pac-10 theme as West Valley's rival, Anderson High School, dons the colors of the University of California and uses the younger version of its mascot.

West Valley's varsity football team did not win a single game for the first three years of the school's existence, reportedly tying a California state record. Although the team won no games for the first three years, its varsity quarterback, Jim Fisher, had a record of second-highest passing yardage in Northern California during his senior year, the 1982 season. In 1984, West Valley finally achieved its first victory, defeating arch-rival Anderson High School. The school's record in football has improved significantly in recent times, and includes a Division 1 section title in 2004.

When it was founded, West Valley became part of the West Side League (WSL). The league at that time included: Corning, Gridley, Orland, West Valley, and Willows High Schools. Later, it became part of the Northern Athletic League (NAL) which includes: Anderson, Central Valley, Corning, Lassen, West Valley, and Yreka High Schools.

In 1987, no one was allowed to wear shorts at school, yet female students were allowed to wear mini-skirts. As a result, a number of the male students one Spring day chose to wear mini-skirts to school in protest. The protest was broadcast on local television that evening and a story was published in Redding's Record Searchlight newspaper the next day.

In 2008, publication of the school's award-winning newspaper, The Eagle Examiner, was discontinued. After a run of almost three decades, interrupted only once in 2005, principal Karl Stemmler cited a lack of interest evidenced by declining enrollment in the school's journalism class.

== Notable alumni ==
=== Athletics ===
Olympic cyclist Matthew Hamon graduated in 1987. He participated in the 1992 Olympic games in Barcelona, earned a bronze medal in the 1995 world championships, was a six-time national champion, and set the American record in team pursuit in 1995 in Paris.

Olympic 800 meter runner Nicole Teter graduated in 1991. She ran in both the Olympic Games in Athens (2004) and Beijing (2008).

Wade Welsh, a 1999 graduate, was drafted into professional baseball by the Long Beach Armada of the Golden Baseball League in 2004. In 2005, he was signed by the Chico Outlaws.

Former Nevada Golden Gloves boxing champion, Steve Ault Jr., graduated in 1998.

Matt Nichols, a 2005 graduate, was the starting quarterback for the Eastern Washington University Eagles, attending the university from 2006 to 2010. Nichols was picked up by the Dallas Cowboys after the NFL 2010 draft where he played in two pre-season games then was released. He currently plays for the Winnipeg Blue Bombers.

=== Entertainment ===
Cindy McCormick Martinusen Coloma, author of several faith-themed novels, graduated in 1988.

Matt Logue, a 1991 graduate, has worked as a senior animator and animation supervisor for such films as The Lord of the Rings trilogy, The Lion, the Witch, and the Wardrobe, The Incredible Hulk, and The Wolfman.

Justin Lentz, a 2001 graduate, is a stand-up comic, graphic artist, disc jockey, and nationally ranked pinball player. He has performed at The Bridgetown Comedy Festival as well as The Comedy Store.

== Gallery ==
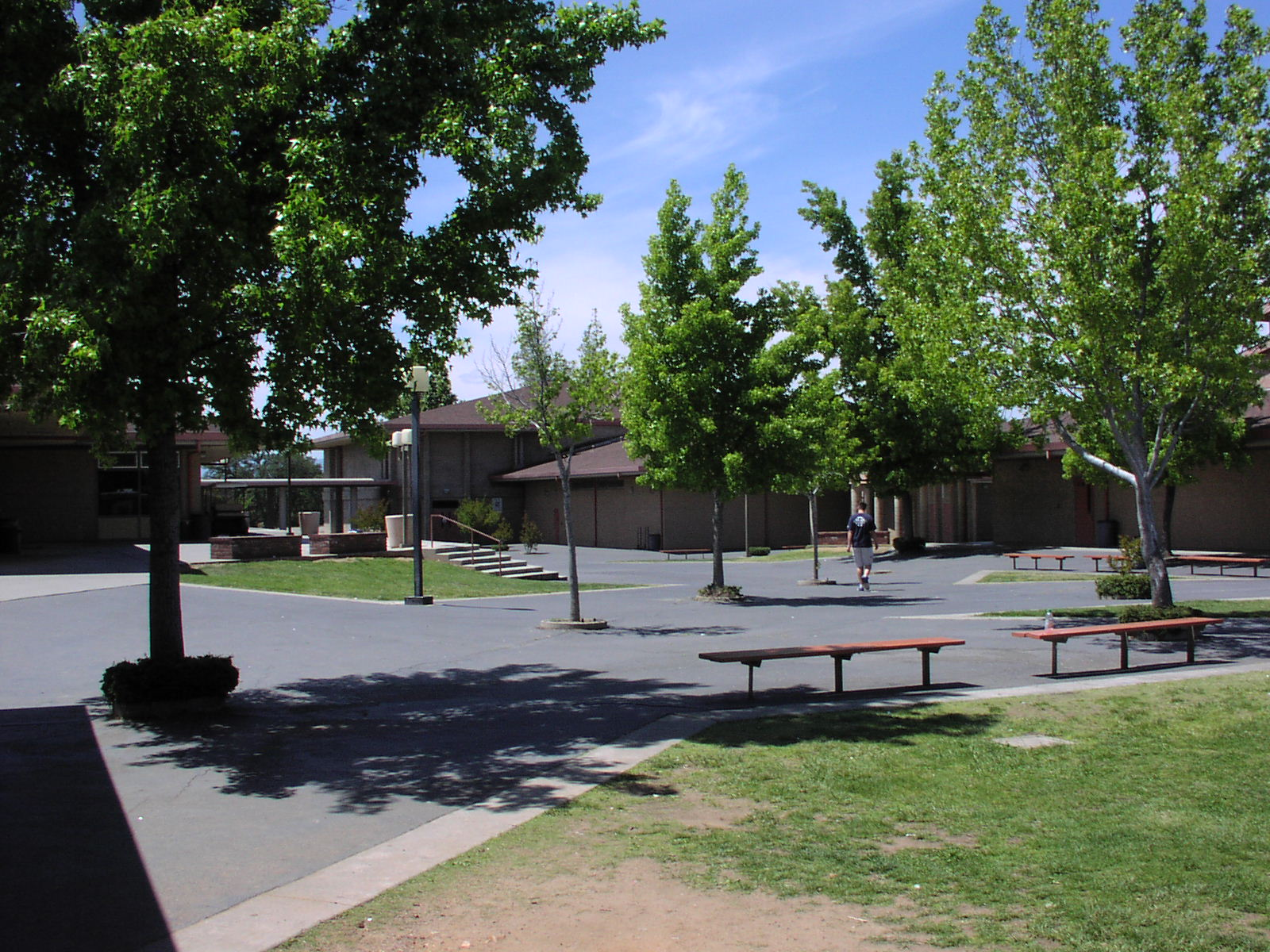
Campus Center in Spring

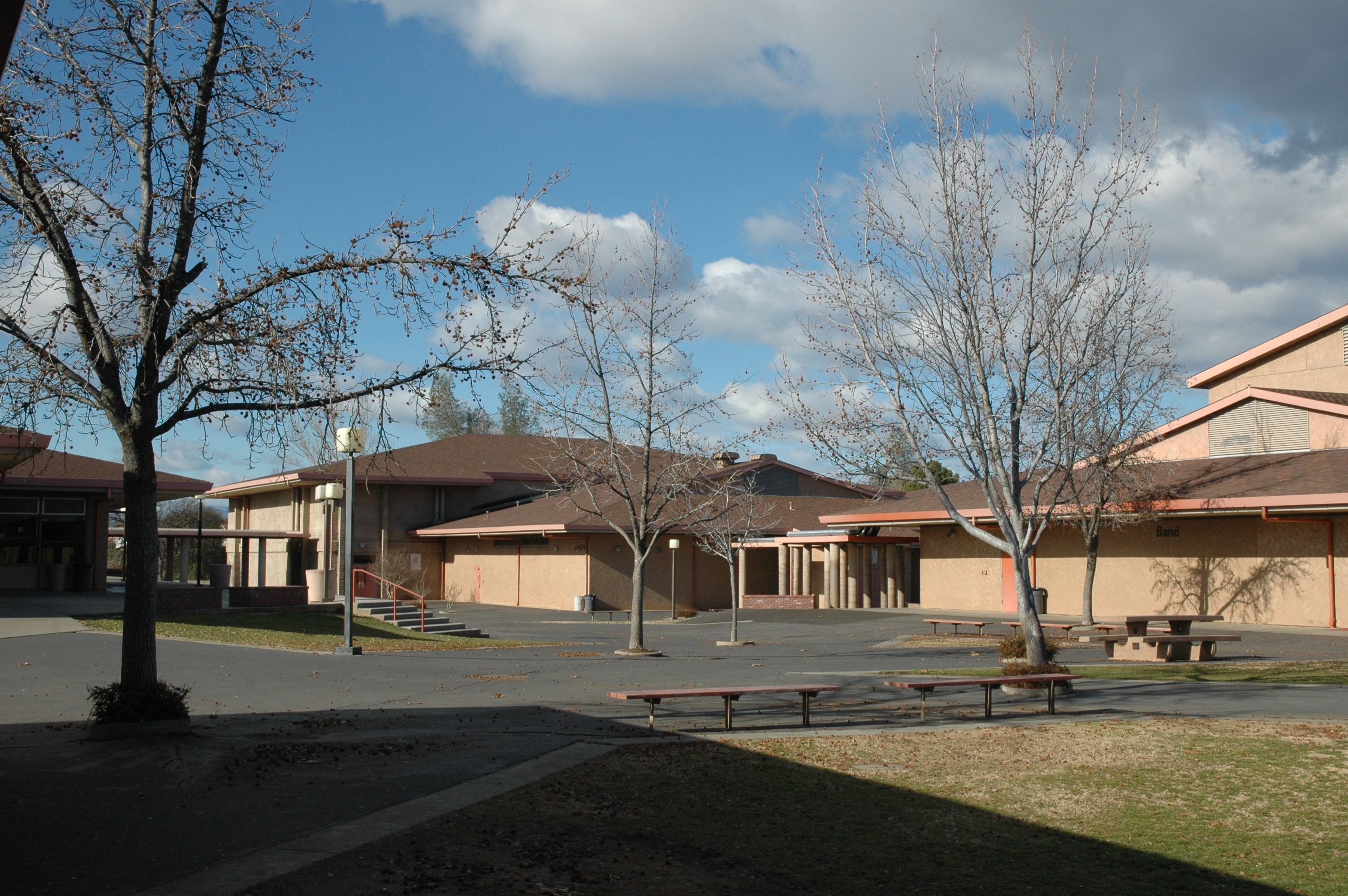
Campus Center in Winter

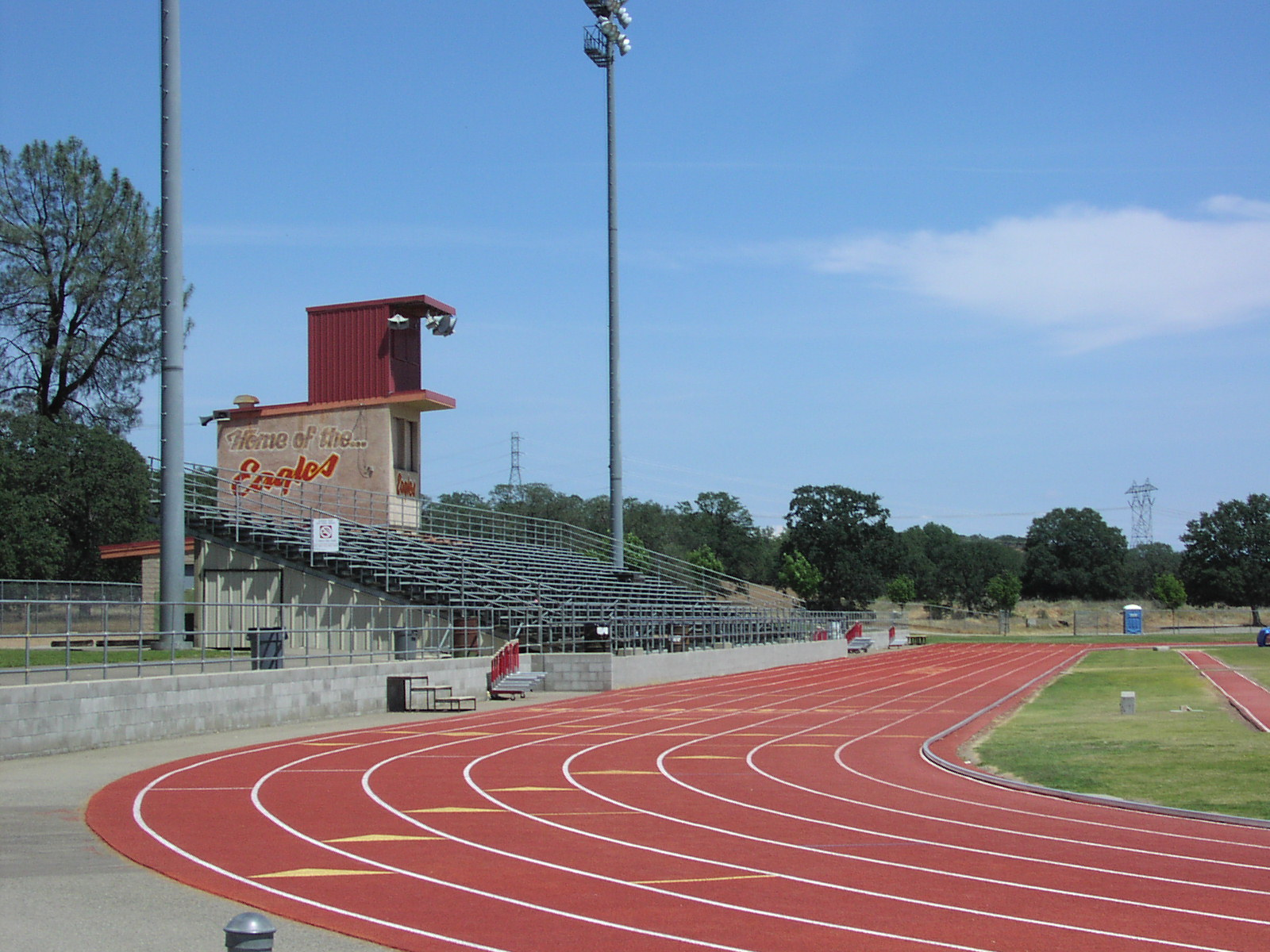
Track and Football Stadium

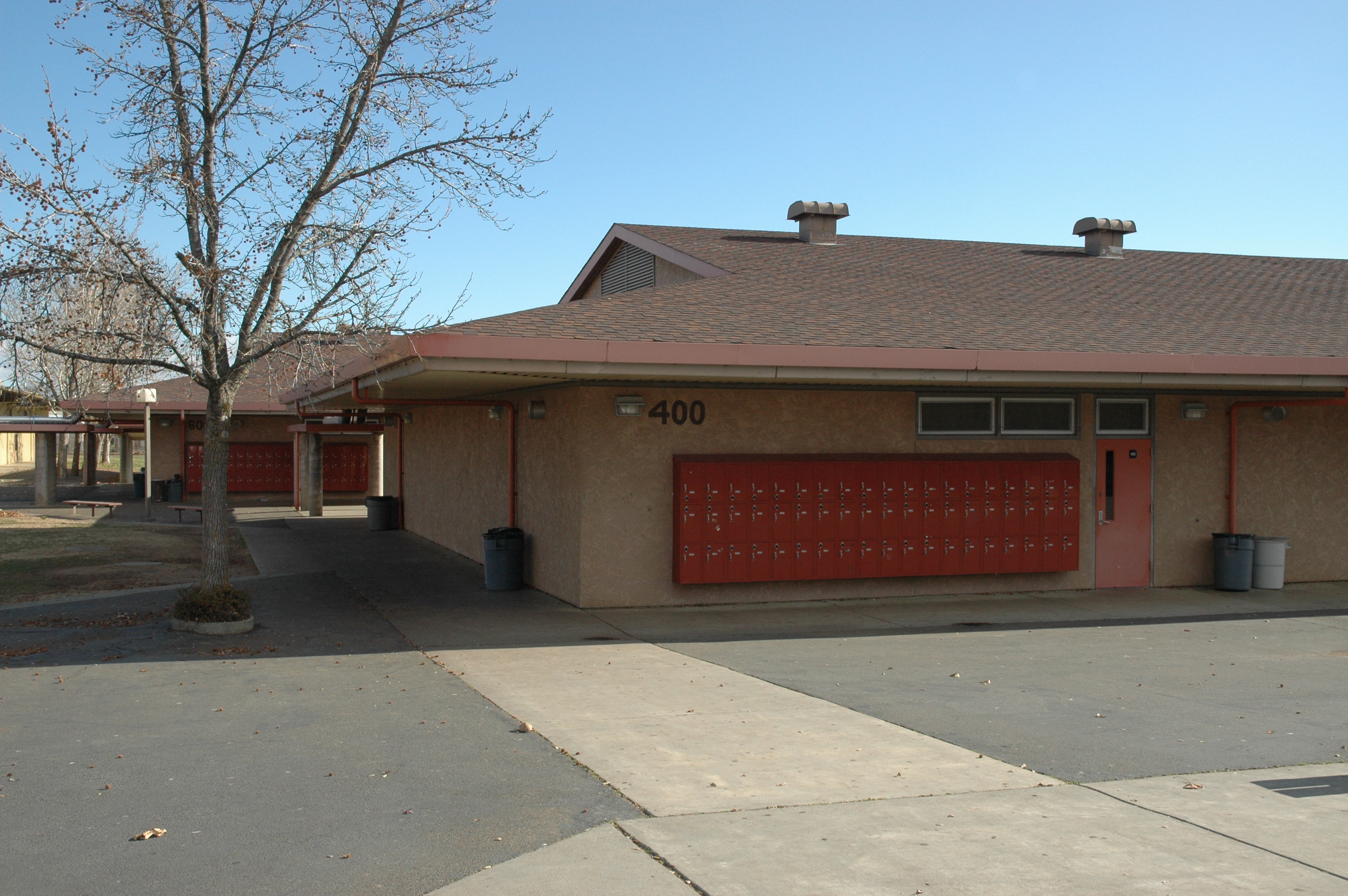
Classroom Wings

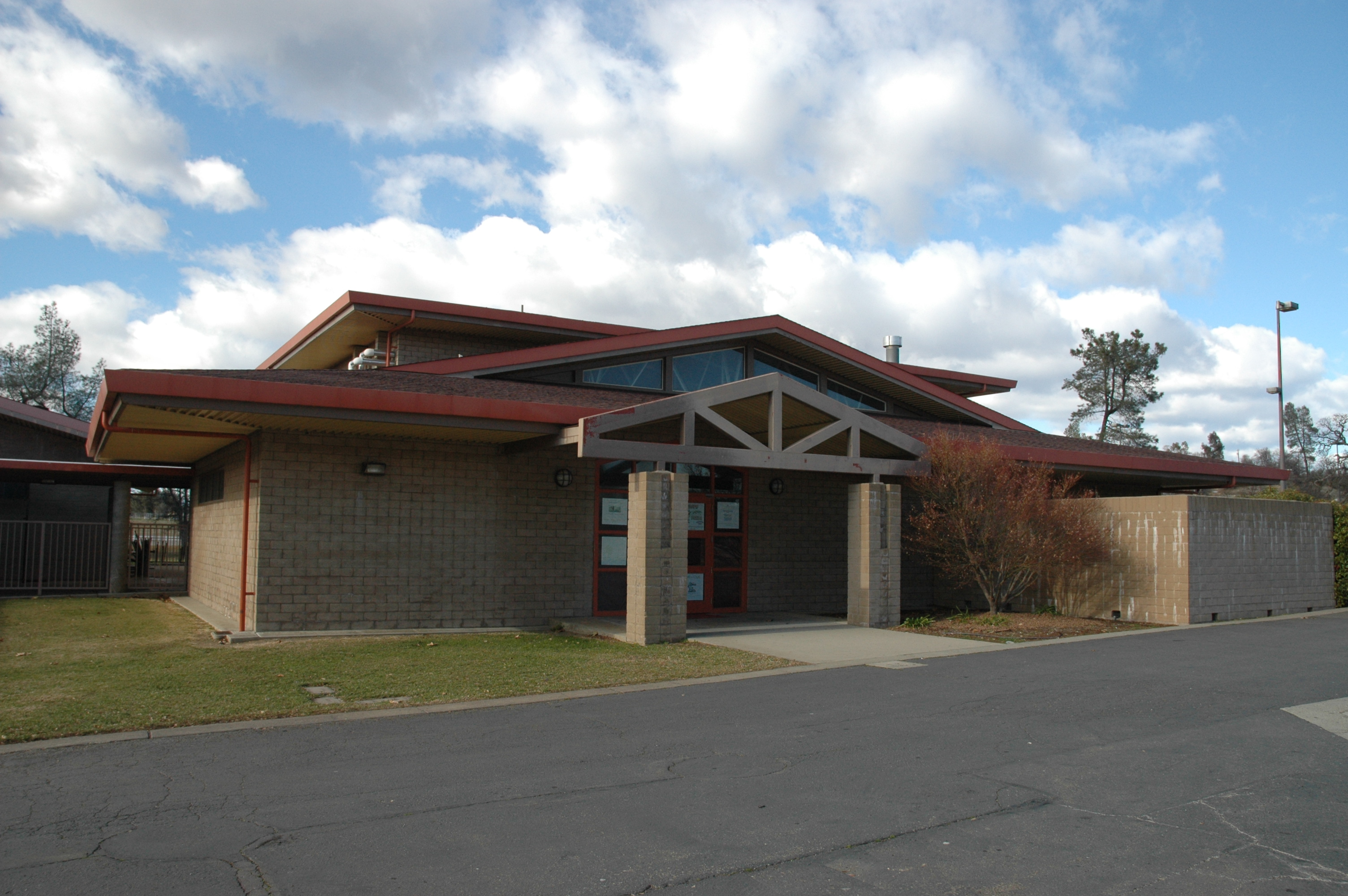
Small Gym

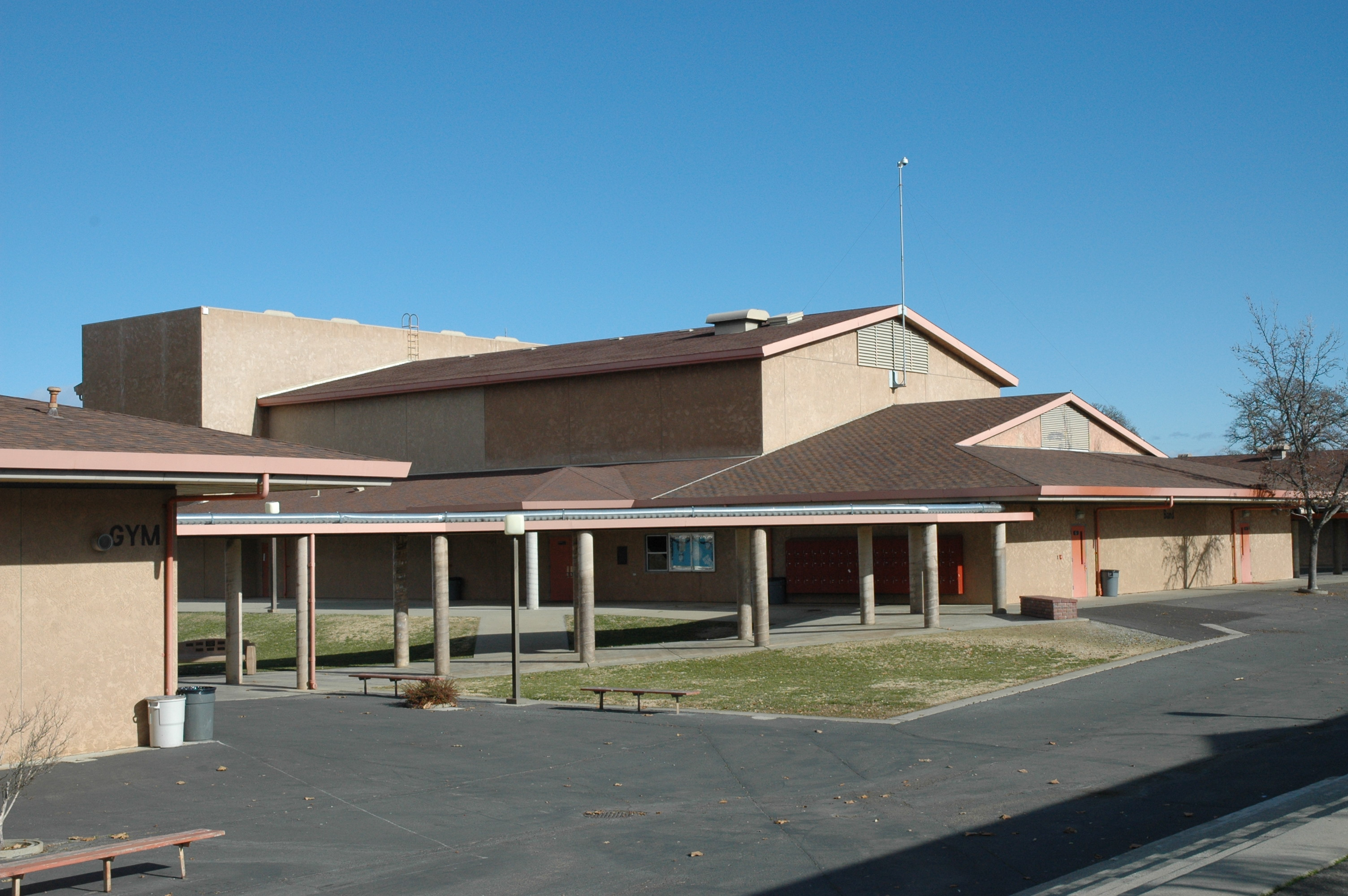
Performing Arts Center
