= Cottonwood, California =

Census-designated place in the United States

- census-designated place
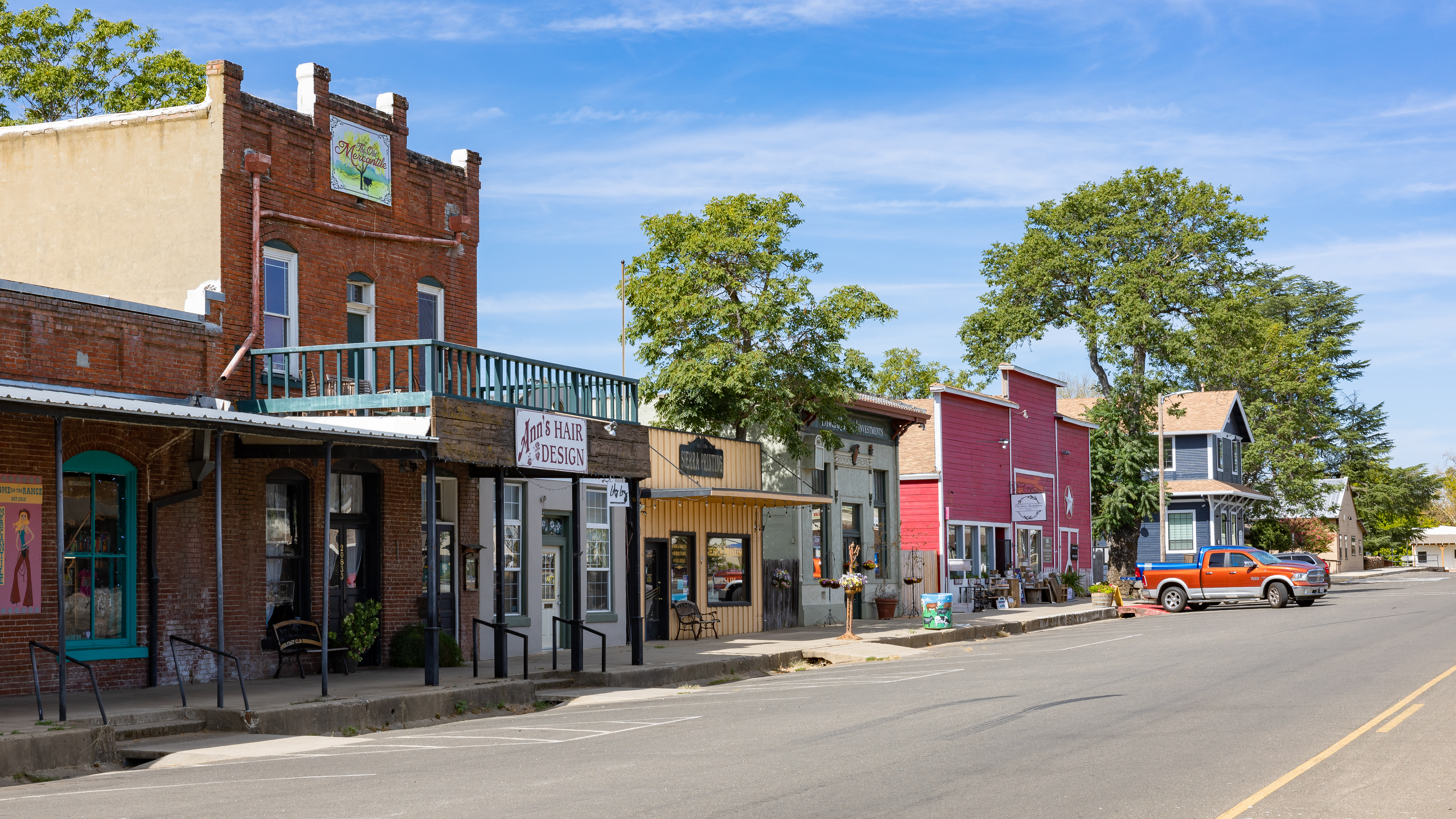
- Front Street in Cottonwood, August 2022

- Location in Shasta County and the state of California
- Coordinates: 40°23′25.03″N 122°18′56.27″W
- Country: United States
- State: California
- County: Shasta

Area
  - Total: 13.225 sq mi (34.25 km^{2})
  - Land: 13.225 sq mi (34.25 km^{2})
  - Water: 0.00 sq mi (0 km^{2}) 0%
- Elevation: 492 ft (150 m)

Population (2020)
  - Total: 6,268
  - Density: 474.0/sq mi (183.0/km^{2})
- Time zone: UTC-8 (Pacific (PST))
  - Summer (DST): UTC-7 (PDT)
- ZIP code: 96022
- Area code: 530
- FIPS code: 06-16630
- GNIS feature ID: 2407668

Cottonwood is a census-designated place (CDP) in Shasta County, California, United States. Its population is 6,268 as of the 2020 census, up from 3,316 from the 2010 census. Cottonwood was a stagecoach town where a settlement was established in 1849. The first Post Office was opened in 1852. Cottonwood is equidistant between Redding and Red Bluff, 15 miles (24 km) in either direction. It is 4 miles (6.4 km) south of Anderson.

== History ==
The single winning ticket for the 5th biggest Mega Millions jackpot ever was sold in Cottonwood. The drawing took place Dec 27, 2024. The total (before taxes) jackpot was $1.22 Billion.

=== Proposed incorporation ===
A number of residents in Cottonwood have expressed interest in incorporation. Not only would it allow the town to have stricter building codes, but it would stop the City of Anderson from further annexation of the surrounding areas.

Cottonwood is one of five CDPs in Shasta County that have expressed interest in incorporating. The other towns are Burney, Shingletown, Fall River Mills, and McArthur. Fall River Mills and McArthur would incorporate as one city together.

A suggestion for combining the new Sunset Hills and Sun City Tehama subdivisions across the Tehama County line with the current CDP would be currently unworkable since the California constitution prohibits incorporated cities and towns from crossing county lines.

== Geography ==
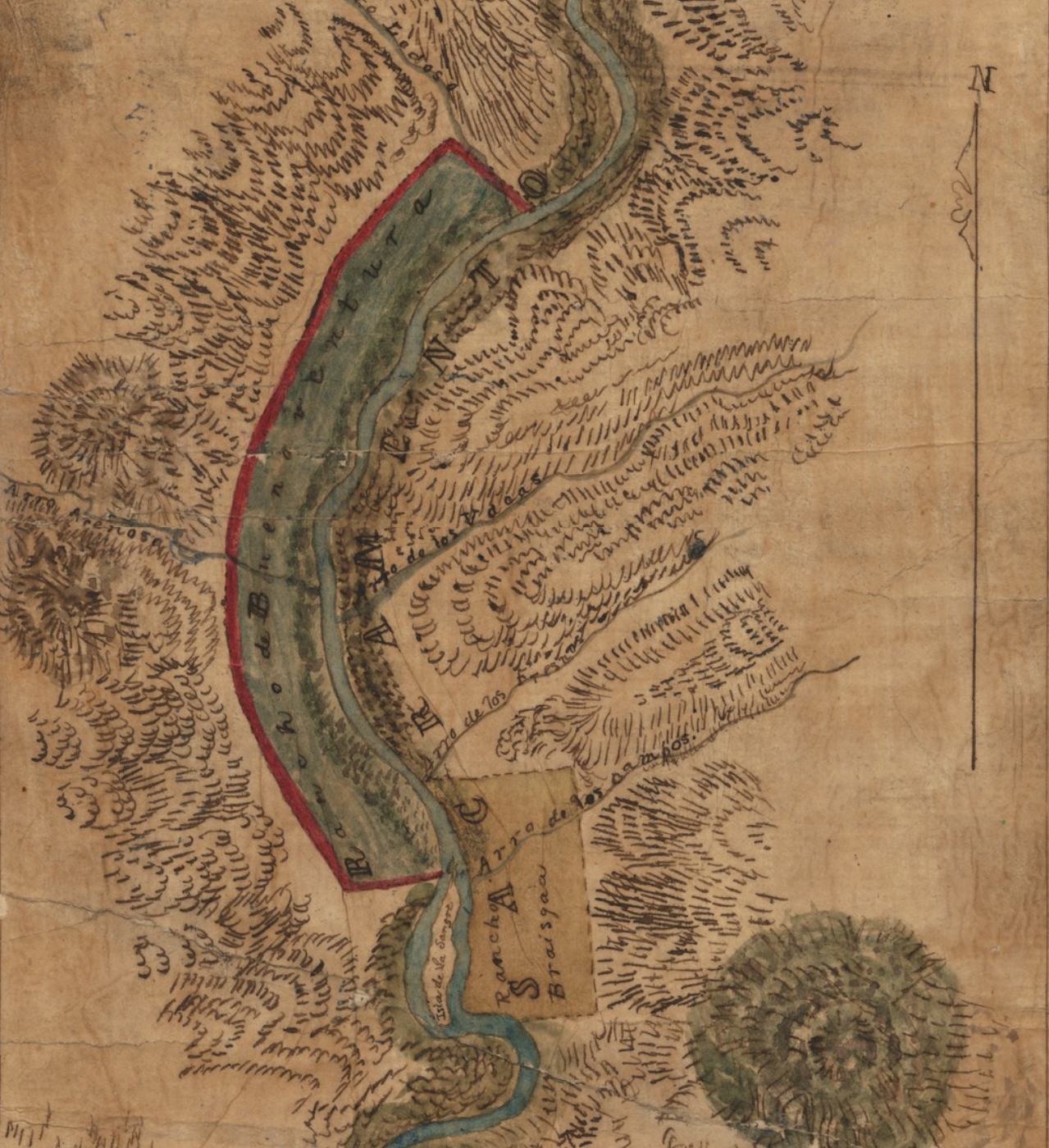
Cottonwood was originally a part of Rancho Buena Ventura, a Mexican-era rancho granted by Governor Manuel Micheltorena to Pierson B. Reading.

Cottonwood is located at 40°23′20″N 122°16′55″W (40.388953, −122.281823).

According to the United States Census Bureau, the CDP has a total area of 13.2 square miles (34 km^{2}), all land.

Cottonwood is located on the north and south bank of Cottonwood Creek, for which it is named.

== Demographics ==
Historical population
| Census | Pop. | Note | %± |
|---|---|---|---|
| 1970 | 1,288 | | — |
| 1980 | 1,553 | | 20.6% |
| 1990 | 1,747 | | 12.5% |
| 2000 | 2,960 | | 69.4% |
| 2010 | 3,316 | | 12.0% |
| 2020 | 6,268 | | 89.0% |
U.S. Decennial Census; 1850–1870 1880-1890; 1900 1910 1920; 1930 1940 1950; 1960 1970 1980; 1990 2000 2010; 2020

Cottonwood first appeared as an unincorporated place in the 1970 U.S. census; and a census designated place in the 1980 United States census.

Cottonwood CDP (Shasta County), California – Racial and ethnic composition Note: the US Census treats Hispanic/Latino as an ethnic category. This table excludes Latinos from the racial categories and assigns them to a separate category. Hispanics/Latinos may be of any race.
| Race / Ethnicity (NH = Non-Hispanic) | Pop 2000 | Pop 2010 | Pop 2020 | % 2000 | % 2010 | % 2020 |
|---|---|---|---|---|---|---|
| White alone (NH) | 2,411 | 2,653 | 4,818 | 81.45% | 80.01% | 76.87% |
| Black or African American alone (NH) | 7 | 4 | 22 | 0.24% | 0.12% | 0.35% |
| Native American or Alaska Native alone (NH) | 82 | 86 | 147 | 2.77% | 2.59% | 2.35% |
| Asian alone (NH) | 90 | 107 | 116 | 3.04% | 3.23% | 1.85% |
| Pacific Islander alone (NH) | 0 | 1 | 3 | 0.00% | 0.03% | 0.05% |
| Other Race alone (NH) | 3 | 4 | 14 | 0.10% | 0.12% | 0.22% |
| Mixed race or Multiracial (NH) | 89 | 109 | 454 | 3.01% | 3.29% | 7.24% |
| Hispanic or Latino (any race) | 278 | 352 | 694 | 9.39% | 10.62% | 11.07% |
| Total | 2,960 | 3,316 | 6,268 | 100.00% | 100.00% | 100.00% |

=== 2020 ===
The 2020 United States census reported that Cottonwood had a population of 6,268. The population density was 474.0 inhabitants per square mile (183.0/km^{2}). The racial makeup of Cottonwood was 80.3% White, 0.4% African American, 2.9% Native American, 1.9% Asian, 0.1% Pacific Islander, 3.5% from other races, and 10.9% from two or more races. Hispanic or Latino of any race were 11.1% of the population.

The whole population lived in households. There were 2,325 households, out of which 31.9% included children under the age of 18, 53.6% were married-couple households, 6.9% were cohabiting couple households, 23.9% had a female householder with no partner present, and 15.6% had a male householder with no partner present. 23.3% of households were one person, and 12.1% were one person aged 65 or older. The average household size was 2.7. There were 1,655 families (71.2% of all households).

The age distribution was 24.5% under the age of 18, 6.8% aged 18 to 24, 25.0% aged 25 to 44, 25.8% aged 45 to 64, and 17.9% who were 65 years of age or older. The median age was 39.8 years. For every 100 females, there were 99.0 males.

There were 2,466 housing units at an average density of 186.5 units per square mile (72.0 units/km^{2}), of which 2,325 (94.3%) were occupied. Of these, 71.7% were owner-occupied, and 28.3% were occupied by renters.

In 2023, the US Census Bureau estimated that the median household income was $96,679, and the per capita income was $44,293. About 5.4% of families and 8.4% of the population were below the poverty line.

=== 2010 ===
The 2010 United States census reported that Cottonwood had a population of 3,316. The population density was 1,433.0 inhabitants per square mile (553.3/km^{2}). The racial makeup of Cottonwood was 2,844 (85.8%) White, 4 (0.1%) African American, 99 (3.0%) Native American, 108 (3.3%) Asian, 2 (0.1%) Pacific Islander, 120 (3.6%) from other races, and 139 (4.2%) from two or more races. Hispanic or Latino of any race were 352 persons (10.6%).

The Census reported that 3,316 people (100% of the population) lived in households, 0 (0%) lived in non-institutionalized group quarters, and 0 (0%) were institutionalized.

There were 1,200 households, out of which 500 (41.7%) had children under the age of 18 living in them, 591 (49.3%) were opposite-sex married couples living together, 200 (16.7%) had a female householder with no husband present, 102 (8.5%) had a male householder with no wife present. 240 households (20.0%) were made up of individuals, and 80 (6.7%) had someone living alone who was 65 years of age or older. The average household size was 2.76. There were 893 families (74.4% of all households); the average family size was 3.14.

The population was spread out, with 950 people (28.6%) under the age of 18, 299 people (9.0%) aged 18 to 24, 805 people (24.3%) aged 25 to 44, 910 people (27.4%) aged 45 to 64, and 352 people (10.6%) who were 65 years of age or older. The median age was 35.8 years. For every 100 females, there were 94.1 males. For every 100 females age 18 and over, there were 91.1 males.

There were 1,306 housing units at an average density of 564.4 per square mile (217.9/km^{2}), of which 759 (63.3%) were owner-occupied, and 441 (36.8%) were occupied by renters. The homeowner vacancy rate was 4.3%; the rental vacancy rate was 7.7%. 2,093 people (63.1% of the population) lived in owner-occupied housing units and 1,223 people (36.9%) lived in rental housing units.

== Politics ==
In the state legislature Cottonwood is located in the 1st senatorial district, represented by Republican Megan Dahle, and the 1st Assembly district, represented by Republican Heather Hadwick.

Federally, Cottonwood is in California's 1st congressional district, represented by Republican James Gallagher.

== Education ==
Cottonwood has one high school, one junior high school, two elementary schools.

West Valley High School (9–12), with an enrollment of approximately 900 students. West Cottonwood Junior High School (5–8) North Cottonwood (k–4) Cottonwood Creek Charter (K-8) with an approximate enrollment of 250 students.

There are three elementary schools, Cottonwood Creek Charter for K-8 and North Cottonwood Elementary for 3–5 on the Shasta side, and Evergreen Elementary on the Tehama side.

There are two public middle schools, West Cottonwood Jr High on the Shasta side and Evergreen Middle on the Tehama side. A school that was recently added as a charter school is Cottonwood Creek Charter.

== Notable people ==
- Tom Hubert, former NASCAR driver and current crew member for Bill Davis Racing (born in Cottonwood).
- Nicole Teter, 800 meter runner: Three-time USA Indoor champion ('02, '03, '08); American record holder at indoor 800m – 1:58.71; 2004 Olympic Trials runner-up; 2008 Olympic competitor; 2002 USA Outdoor Champion; 2003 U.S. Outdoor runner-up; 1991 USA Junior champion. Graduated from West Valley High School (located in Cottonwood, California).

== In popular culture ==
In the spring of 1997 Hollywood came to this small, quiet town to film Almost Heroes starring Matthew Perry and Chris Farley. It was Farley's last film. The scenes were shot on Reading Island in the Sacramento River.

In the summer of 1961, parts of Hell Is for Heroes, starring Steve McQueen, were shot in and around Cottonwood. Bob Newhart made his debut appearance in this film.

== Gallery ==
Cottonwood, California

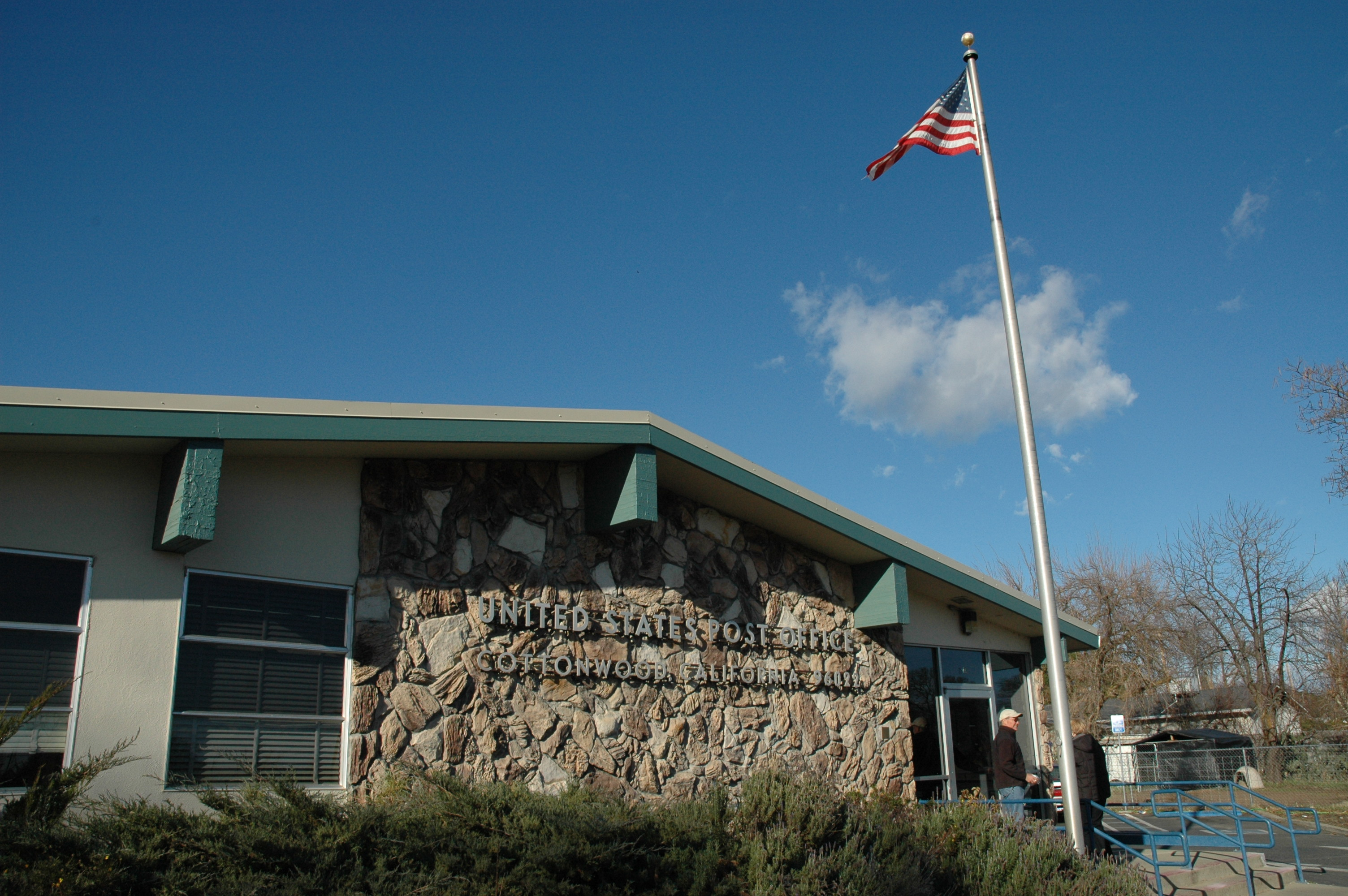
Cottonwood Post Office

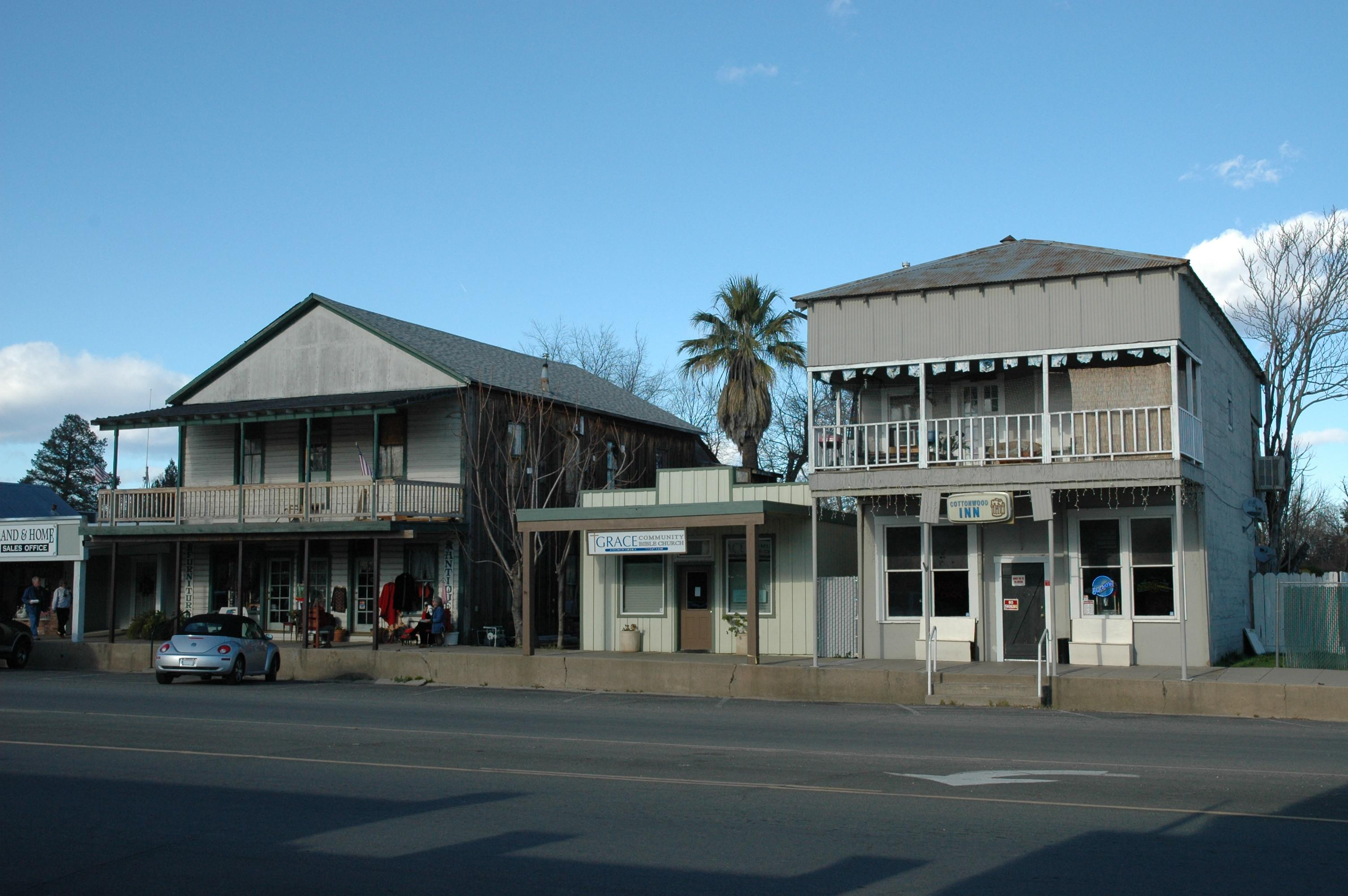
North side of Front Street

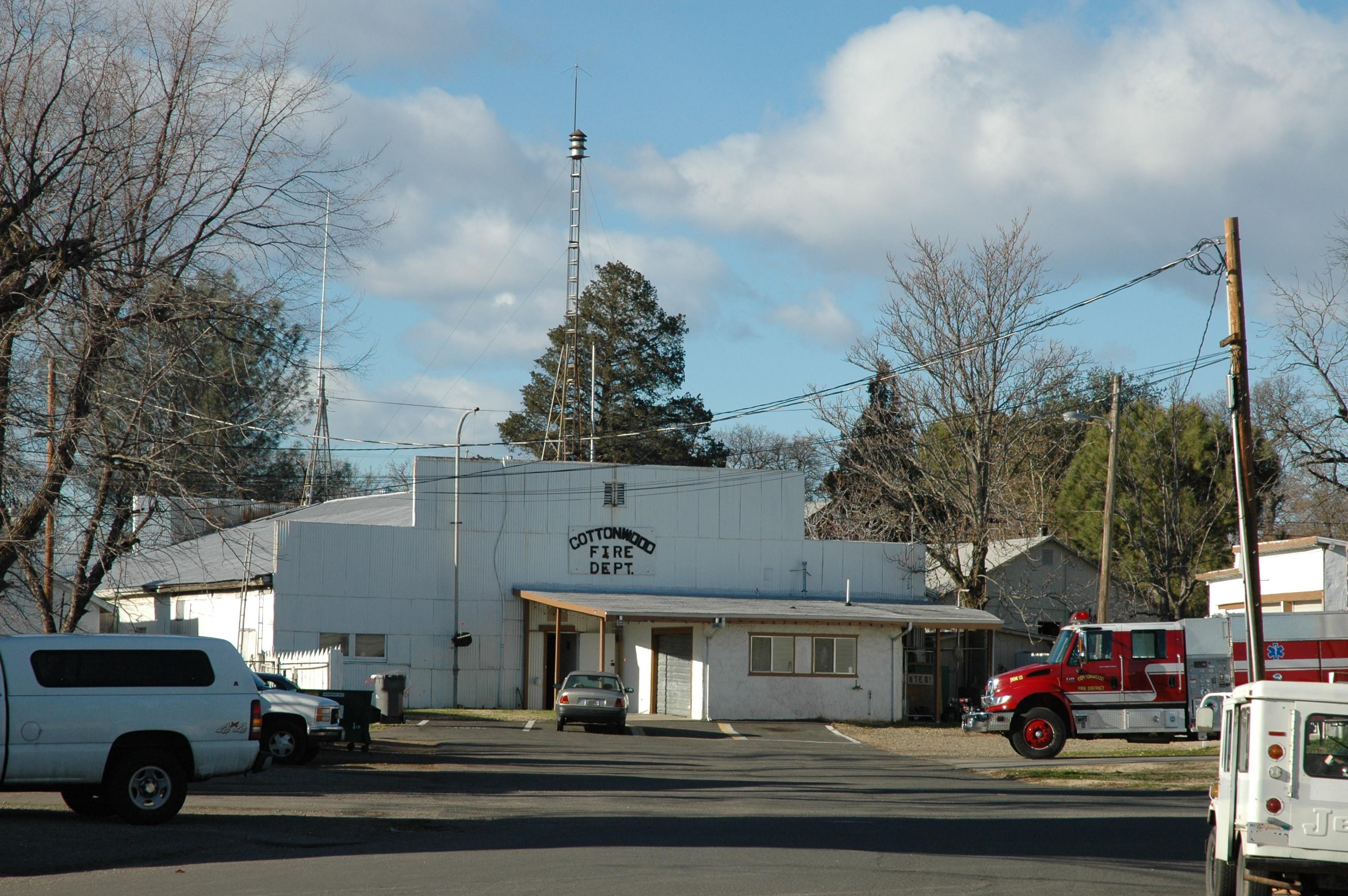
Cottonwood Fire Dept.
