= Shasta High School =

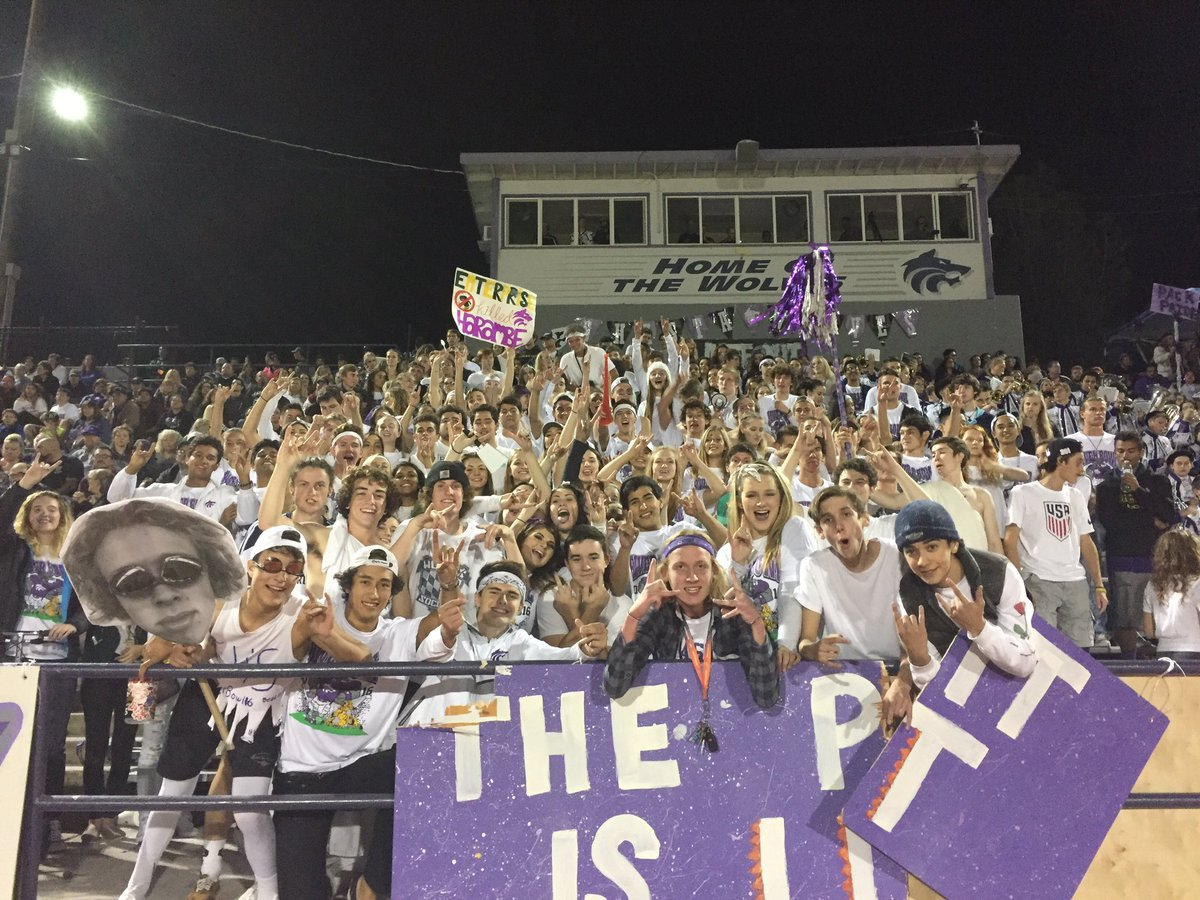

Location
- 2500 Eureka Way; Redding, California 96001; USA; 40.58821°N 122.40972°W

Information
- Type: Public high school
- Motto: Home of the Wolves
- Established: 1899
- School district: Shasta Union High School District
- Staff: 60.96 (FTE)
- Grades: 9–12
- Enrollment: 1,284 (2023-2024)
- Student to teacher ratio: 21.06
- Colors: Purple; White
- Mascot: Wolves
- Newspaper: Paw Print
- Yearbook: Daisy
- Website: www.shastawolves.com

Shasta High School is an American public high school located in Redding, California. With an enrollment of over 1600 students, it is the largest high school in Shasta County, California. It has been recognized as a California Distinguished School three times and has earned a six-year Western Association of Schools and Colleges accreditation. Its main rival is Enterprise High School.

== History ==
In 1899, Shasta County High School opened as a public school to serve the town of Redding, California. The inaugural class had only 70 students, 3 teachers, and a very small number of graduates. The courses were college preparatory and in addition vocational classes, such as bookkeeping and shorthand, were taught. The initial school was located in the residence of Judge Bell but in 1903, a two-story brick building was built for the 1904–1905 school year. After a countywide election in 1915, Shasta Union High School District was created and the school was renamed Shasta High School.

By 1926, the student enrollment number had grown to over 450, and need for a new campus became clear, as the school building had been built for 250 students. In March, 1926 a location was picked at the corner of Magnolia and Eureka streets. By October 1927, students were able to move into the new school. In 1950, Shasta Junior College was built on land west of the Shasta High School and remained there until a new college was built in east Redding in 1967. Shasta High moved one last time into the vacated Shasta College facilities which is its location today. The old Shasta High Building became Nova High, which housed all 9th graders in the district. After 9th grade, the students moved on to either Shasta High, Central Valley High, or Enterprise High for 10–12.

In 1991, Nova High was closed and 9th graders moved back into Shasta High and the other high schools. The old building would later become Shasta Learning Center, home to the district offices and to University Preparatory School.

== Academics ==
Shasta High School offers a variety of advanced courses, such as College Prep, Honors, and Advanced Placement.

Shasta High also offers Career/Technical Education courses including a Science/ Technology/ Engineering/ Math pathway (STEM), and a medical pathway including on-campus courses such as Nursing, Sports Medicine, and Dentistry.

They offer foreign languages: French, Spanish, Mandarin Chinese and American Sign Language.

== Athletics ==
Shasta High School offers the following sports:

- Alpine Skiing/Snowboarding
- Baseball
- Basketball
- Cheerleading
- Cross Country
- American football
- Golf
- Soccer
- Softball
- Swimming
- Tennis
- Track and Field
- Volleyball
- Wrestling

In 2014, the cheerleading squad went to Orlando, Florida to compete in the UCA's National High School Cheerleading Championship, where they placed 5th in the large varsity division non-tumbling.

=== River Bowl ===
Shasta High School's main rival is Enterprise High School (Redding, California). The Rivalry of Enterprise High and Shasta High started back in the 1950s, when both schools would steal the other's "prized" possession. For Shasta High School it was the Shasta High Bell. The annual football game between the two rivals would later be called the Riverbowl. The tradition began in 1993, with Enterprise dominating the first 11 years. In 2004, Shasta won the Riverbowl and again in 2005 and 2007, but lost in 2008. Enterprise won again in 2009. The 2010 Riverbowl was won by Shasta with a score of 53–20. That year's Varsity kicker was Ellie Oliver, possibly the only girl football player in the north state at that time.

River Bowl Games since 2004
Year	Score		2018	47-10	W
2017	47-0	W			
2016	42-21	W			
2015	63-21	W			
2014	0-41	L			
2013	13-50	L			
2012	6-24	L			
2011	48-42	W			
2010	53-20	W			
2009	20-33	L			
2008	35-38	L			
2007	24-17	W			
2006	0-10	L			
2005	28-7	W			
2004	42-6	W			

== Performing Arts ==
Shasta High School's instrumentalist groups and choirs perform and compete several concerts and festivals each year. Since the 1960s they have collaborated on two major events each year: a madrigal dinner and a musical.

=== Choir ===
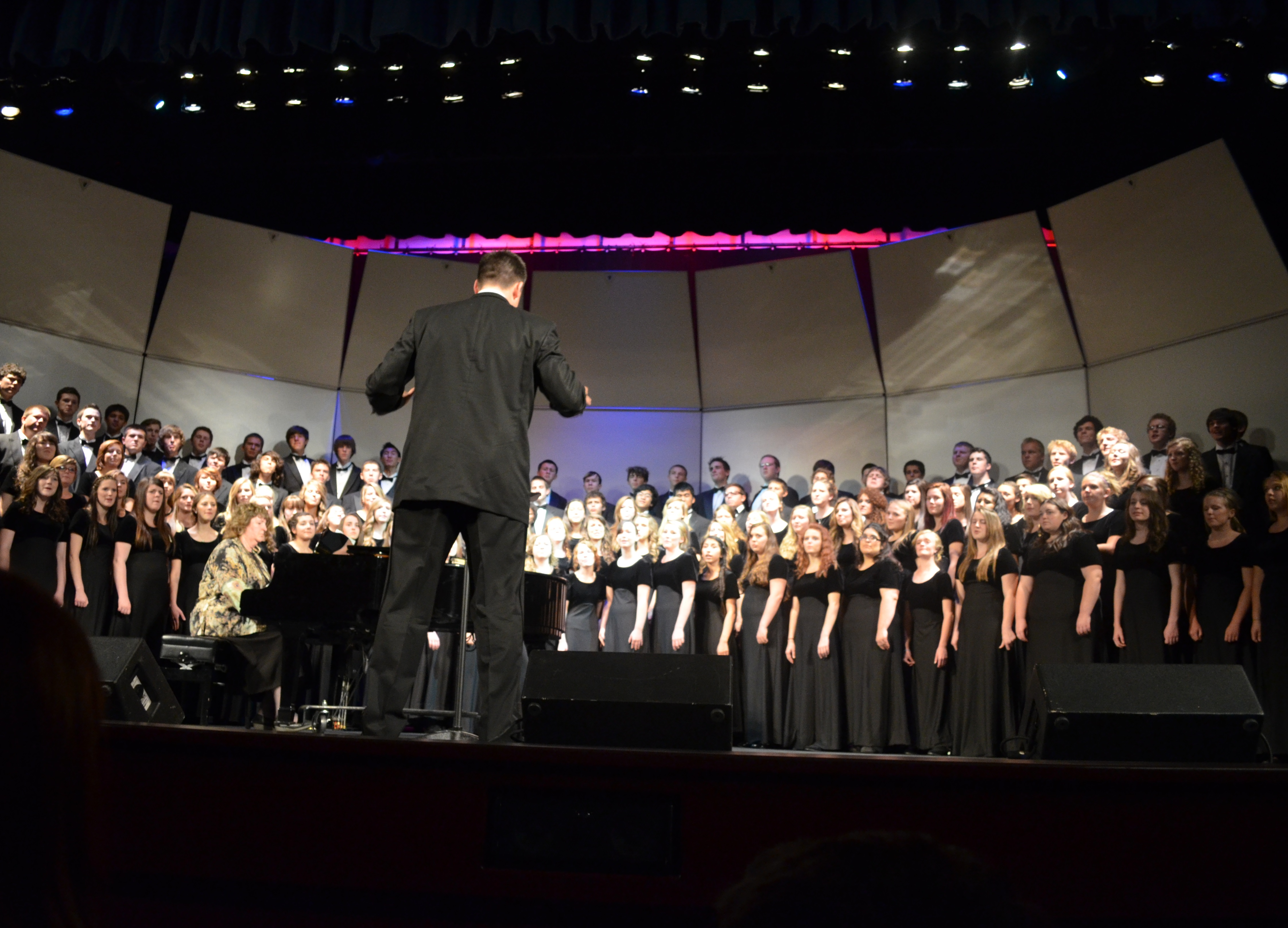
Choir with Gavin Spencer, director. (winter, 2012)

Shasta's A Cappella Choir is the mix choir and largest choral group at Shasta. In 2014, they competed in the California Golden State Choral Competition for the first time, where they placed 5th in the large choir division. They competed again in 2015 and won 4th place, and again in 2016 and won 3rd place.

The Madrigal choir, the advanced mixed choir, is most featured during the annual Madrigal Dinner, and is hired to sing at various functions around town throughout the year. In 2016, the Madrigal Choir completed in the small choir division of the Golden State Competition and won 5th place.

Shasta has three other choirs: Troubadors (beginner boys), Nightingales (beginner girls), and Choraliers (advance girls).

=== Instrumental ===
There are five performing instrumental music groups at Shasta: Concert Band, Symphonic Band, Strings, Orchestra, and The Shasta Jazz Ambassadors. The combined concert and symphonic bands perform at each year's graduation ceremony and during home varsity football games. They also perform at the annual Redding Rodeo Parade, and the Lighted Christmas Parade.

== Student life ==
=== Clubs ===
Shasta High School also offers a variety of clubs for students. It participates in the National Science Bowl and was involved in the local TV game show Academic Challenge until its cancellation in 2005. Shasta's Interact Club and Students joined to create a fundraiser for the Genocide situations in Darfur.

== Notable people ==
=== Notable alumni ===
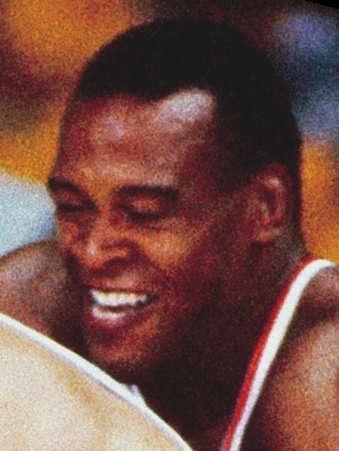
Greg Gibson, class of 1972, Olympic Greco-Roman wrestler

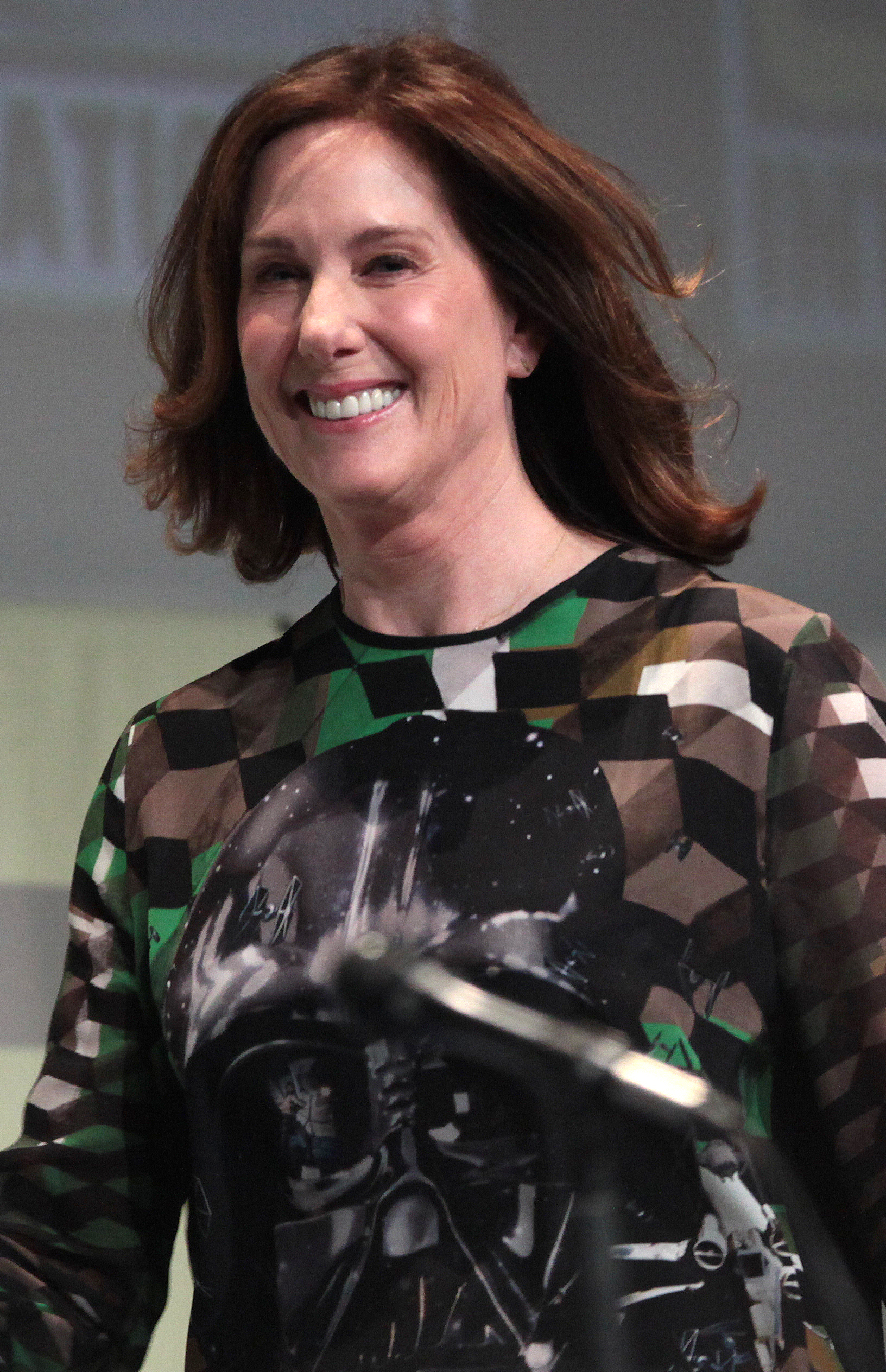
Kathleen Kennedy, class of 1971, Film Producer and President of LucasFilm

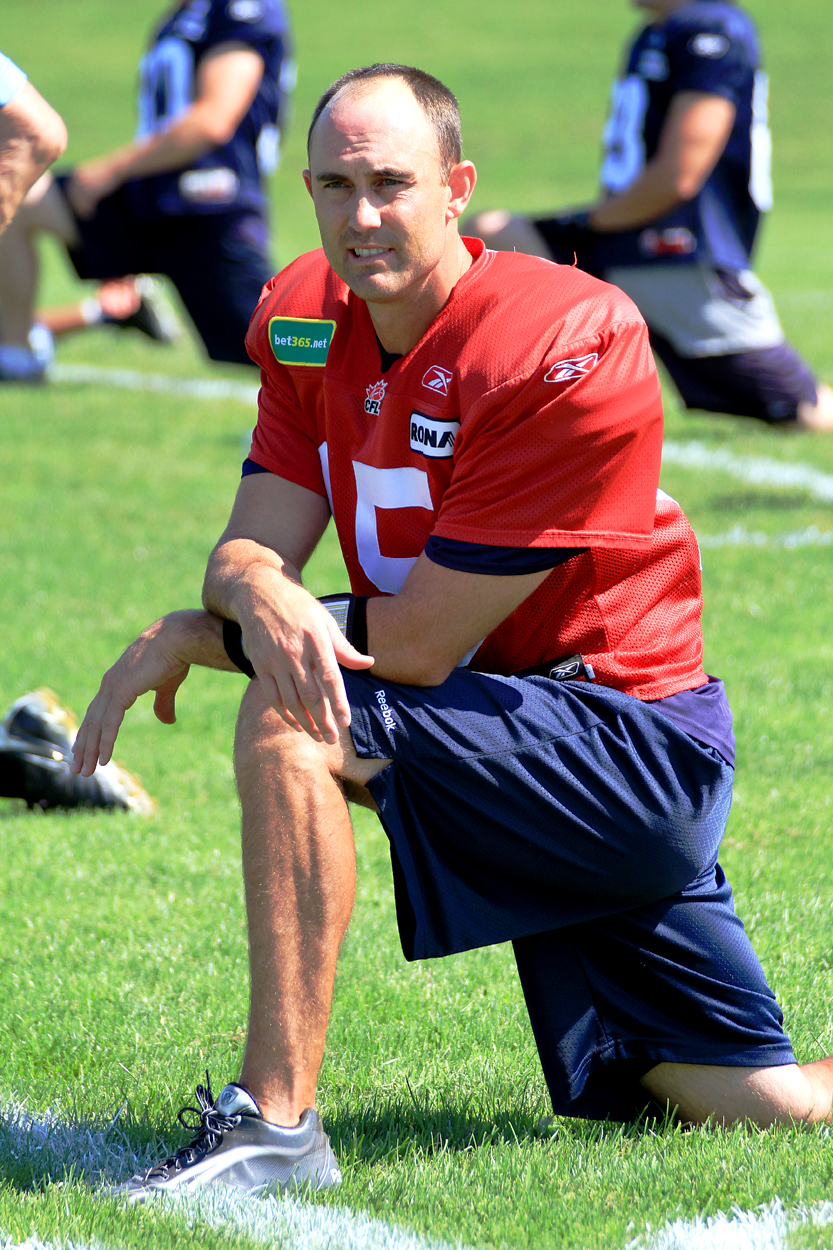
Ricky Ray, class of 1997, Canadian Football League standout quarterback
*James Bassham (class of 1940), American scientist and chemistry researcher known for his work on photosynthesis.
- Iola Whitlock Brubeck (class of 1940), Playwright and manager and publicist for her husband, Dave Brubeck.
- Mike Chase (class of 1970), Former NASCAR driver. He won the 1994 series championship in the NASCAR Winston West Series
- Rod Curl (class of 1961), Former pro golfer. First full-blooded Native American to win a PGA Tour event.
- Greg Gibson (class of 1972), Olympic Greco-Roman wrestler. Wrestled at University of Oregon and later became an All-American and NCAA place winner. He placed 2nd at the 1984 Summer Olympics and earned the silver medal.
- John Gibson (class of 1964), American radio talk show host. He hosts a program on Fox News Radio.
- Steve Gunner (class of 1970), Member of Creedence Clearwater Revisited (formerly Creedence Clearwater Revival)
- Wayne Hawkins (class of 1955), Former pro football player. Played for the Denver Broncos and Oakland Raiders.
- Kathleen Kennedy (class of 1971), Film Producer and President of LucasFilm. She produced movies such as Jurassic Park, E.T. the Extra-Terrestrial and Star Wars: The Force Awakens.
- Matthew Kennedy (class of 1975), American writer, film historian, and anthropologist.
- Ricky Ray (class of 1997), Canadian Football League standout quarterback. He has led the Edmonton Eskimos to two Grey Cup championships, winning Grey Cup MVP honors each time.
- Garrett Russell (class of 2008), lead vocalist of metalcore band Silent Planet.
