= University Preparatory School (Redding, California) =

Location
- 2200 Eureka Way; Redding, California 96001; United States
- Coordinates: 40.587°N 122.405°W

Information
- Opened: 2004
- Status: Open
- School district: Shasta Union High School District
- Principal: Monica Cabral
- Staff: 15
- Faculty: 48
- Grades: 6-12
- Color
- Mascot: Panther
- Website: www.uprep.net

University Preparatory School is a grade 6-12 college preparatory school located in Redding, California, United States established in 2004. The school is a charter school within the Shasta Union High School District.

Located in the Shasta Learning Center, the school's facilities include three gymnasiums, a stadium with an all-weather turf field, softball and baseball fields, and 1000-seat theater.

Highly respected as one of the best 250 schools in the country, it has some of the highest AP and average SAT/ACT scores of all public high schools in the country.

== Administration ==
Monica Cabral is the current principal at U-Prep, in her 1st year (as of 2025) on the job.

== See also ==
- Nova High School, which formerly occupied the site
