= Enterprise High School (Redding, California) =

Location
- 3411 Churn Creek Road; Redding, California; USA; 40.55766°N 122.35182°W

Information
- Type: Public high school
- Established: 1954
- School district: Enterprise School District
- Principal: Ryan Johnson
- Teaching staff: 53.73 (FTE)
- Grades: 9–12
- Enrollment: 1,158 (2023–2024)
- Student to teacher ratio: 21.55
- Colors: Gold; Black
- Mascot: Hornet
- Yearbook: Vespa
- Website: www.enterprisehornets.com

Enterprise High School is a public high school in Redding, California. It has an enrollment of about 1200 students. Enterprise High School is part of Shasta Union High School District in Redding. Its main rival is Shasta High School.

== Administration ==
- Principal - Ryan Johnson
- Assistant Principal - Joey Brown
- Assistant Principal - Jill Hardy

Enterprise is one of the few schools to have had a husband and wife team as principals - Eric Peterson from 2006-2016 and Shelle Peterson from 2001-2003.

== Academics ==
Enterprise High School is a state-recognized distinguished school in California. The foreign languages offered are Spanish and American Sign Language. There is also a drama department, which lets students perform in plays and musicals. Enterprise currently offers Honors and Advanced Placement Courses in: English I, English II, English III, English IV, Biology, Physics, Chemistry, Psychology, European History, U.S. History, American Government/Economics, Statistics, Trigonometry, Calculus, and Spanish.

Due to the low socio-economic status of Enterprise, test scores are reflective of that status. Contrary to popular belief, however, Enterprise ranks a 10 out of 10 when compared to schools of similar size. Other schools in the district rank much lower when compared to schools of equivalent size and socio-economic status. Enterprise also has an extensive and broad College Preparatory program. Every subject is offered in CP level, acceptable to the University of California and California State University systems.

Enterprise has an extensive list of available electives, in which they satisfy unit credit for the UC and CSU systems.

=== Music ===
- Marching and concert bands
- "Starship", a pop-oriented music program. Starship is made up of a band (usually consisting of two keyboardists, a bassist, a guitarist, two drummers, four trumpets, three trombones, and 5 saxophonists) and "Singer/Dancers" which, as the name suggests, sing and dance.
- Traditional choirs
- Vocal jazz choir "T.B.A."

Enterprise stages the Victorian Dinner Celebration now in its 31st year of performances. This original dinner/play set in a Victorian Christmas holiday venue is an evening of comedy, food, and vocal and instrumental music.

== Athletics ==
Enterprise currently requires a 2.0 GPA to participate in sports.

- Alpine Skiing/Snowboarding
- Baseball
- Basketball
- Cheerleading
- Cross country
- Football
- Golf
- Soccer
- Softball
- Stunt cheer
- Swimming
- Tennis
- Track and field
- Volleyball
- Wrestling

=== River Bowl ===
Every October, Enterprise and their main rival, Shasta High School, play in a celebrated game called the River Bowl. The Hornets and the Wolves have been playing for the bowl for at least three decades.

Student Demographics in 2011
1. African American (1.47%)
2. Asian (10.0%)
3. Caucasian (70.2%)
4. Hispanic or Latino (11.4%)
5. Multiple Race (3.17%)
6. Native American (2.78%)
7. Pacific Islander (0.62%)

== Demographics ==
In 2011, Enterprise High School had 1,294 Students: 1.9% African American, 10% Asian, 70.17% Caucasian, 11.44% Hispanic or Latino, 2.78% Native American, and 0.62% Pacific Islander.

== Bodine v. Enterprise High School ==
Around 1 A.M. on March 1, 1982, 18-year-old Rick Earl Bodine and three others trespassed on the roof of Enterprise High School, allegedly to steal floodlights from the roof. After handing down one of the lights, Bodine reportedly walked across to take a second light, but in the dark and rain, he fell through a painted-over skylight; the trespassers called an ambulance. Brain damage from the 27-foot fall initially left Bodine mute and quadriplegic.

The state declined to prosecute Bodine, viewing that the injuries were more than sufficient punishment. Bodine's attorney, Al Naphan, sued the school district, arguing the district was negligent; a similar incident had occurred at the district's Shasta High School on June 6, 1981, killing Paul Andrew Schurr. Judge Joseph Redmon ruled that criminal conduct would not bar Bodine from suing or collecting. The district's insurance company settled the case for $260,000 up front plus $1,500 per month for the rest of Bodine's life.

The Bodine case was referenced by California assemblyman Alister McAlister during his campaign for AB200; while a similar bill (AB2800) had been rejected in the previous session, AB200 was signed into law on October 2, 1985. Statute 847 of the California Civil Code currently states:

(a) An owner, including, but not limited to, a public entity, as defined in Section 811.2 of the Government Code, of any estate or any other interest in real property, whether possessory or nonpossessory, shall not be liable to any person for any injury or death that occurs upon that property during the course of or after the commission of any of the felonies set forth in subdivision (b) by the injured or deceased person.

A 1986 ad in support of Proposition 51, also featuring McAlister, started with the line "Attempting to steal from a school, a burglar falls through a gymnasium skylight and sues the school for his injuries."

A fictional case similar to Bodine is mentioned in the 1997 film Liar Liar; in 2012, former Arizona Senate president Russell Pearce cited the fictional lawsuit while campaigning for the Crime Victims Protection Act Amendment.

== Notable alumni ==
- Sam Butcher (class of 1956), creator of Precious Moments drawings, figurines and dolls
- Carol Clover (class of 1958), American professor of Medieval Studies (Early Northern Europe) and American Film at the University of California, Berkeley
- Michael Zagaris (class of 1963), Oakland Athletics and San Francisco 49ers team photographer
- Jeffery Dangl (class of 1976), biology researcher and scientist
- Shane Drake (class of 1992), music video director
- Ryan O'Callaghan (class of 2001), NFL football player
- Lynne Roberts (class of 1993), women's basketball head coach, University of Utah
