= Central Valley High School (Shasta Lake, California) =

High school in Shasta Lake, California

Location
- 4066 La Mesa Avenue; Shasta Lake, California 96019; United States; 40.6770°N 122.3736°W

Information
- Type: Public Secondary
- School district: Gateway Unified School District
- Principal: Alex Lain
- Teaching staff: 28.03 (FTE)
- Grades: 9–12
- Enrollment: 583 (2023-2024)
- Student to teacher ratio: 20.80
- Colors: Navy, red, and white
- Mascot: Falcon
- Website: Central Valley High School

Central Valley High School (CVHS) is a high school for grades 9-12 located in Shasta Lake, California, United States.

== Alumni ==
- Rod Curl – PGA Tour winner
- Jeremy Edwardson – record producer
- Paul Howard – pro-football player
- Ashley Parker Angel – singer
