= USA Today All-USA High School Baseball Team =

Each year, the American newspaper USA Today awards outstanding high-school baseball players with a place on its All-USA High School Baseball Team. The newspaper names athletes whom they believe to be the best baseball players from high schools across the United States. The newspaper has named a team every year since 1998.

In 1989, USA Today began naming an annual USA Today High School Baseball Player of the Year and an annual USA Today High School Baseball Coach of the Year.

In 1998, the paper also began naming an annual USA Today All-USA High School Baseball Team of 9 to 11 players, with one member of the team designated the USA Today High School Baseball Player of the Year.

== USA Today High School Players and Coaches of the Year (1989–1997) ==
See footnote

Year	Player	Position	High School	Hometown	MLB Draft
1989	Tyler Houston	Catcher	Valley High School	Las Vegas, NV	1st Round – 2nd pick of 1989 Draft (Braves)
1990	Todd Van Poppel	Pitcher	Martin High School	Arlington, TX	1st Round – 14th pick of 1990 Draft (A's)
1991	Brien Taylor	Pitcher	East Carteret High School	Beaufort, NC	1st Round – 1st pick of 1991 Draft (Yankees)
1992	Derek Jeter	Infielder	Central High School	Kalamazoo, MI	1st Round – 6th pick of 1992 Draft (Yankees)
1993	Alex Rodriguez	Infielder	Westminster Christian School	Miami, FL	1st Round – 1st pick of 1993 Draft (Mariners)
1994	Doug Million	Pitcher	Sarasota High School	Sarasota, FL	1st Round – 7th pick of 1994 Draft (Rockies)
1995	Ben Davis	Catcher	Malvern Prep	Malvern, PA	1st Round – 2nd pick of 1995 Draft (Padres)
1996	Marshall Todd	Infield/CF	Oakland High School	Murfreesboro, TN	1st Round 13th pick Padres
1997	Rick Ankiel	Pitcher	Port St. Lucie High School	Port St. Lucie, FL	2nd Round – 72nd pick of 1997 Draft (Cardinals)

Year	Coach	High School
1989	Clyde Metcalf	Sarasota High School, Sarasota, FL
1990	Mike Smith	Lake Brantley High School, Altamonte Springs, FL
1991	Gary Yeatts	Fairfield High School, Fairfield, OH
1992	Rich Hofman	Westminster Christian School, Miami, FL
1993	Mike Noakes	Bullard High School, Fresno, CA
1994	Clyde Metcalf	Sarasota High School, Sarasota, FL
1995	Phil Clark	Germantown High School, Germantown, TN
1996	Rich Hofman	Westminster Christian School, Miami, FL
1997	James Patrick	Clovis High School, Clovis, CA

== 1995 team ==
Coach of the Year: Phil Clark (Germantown High School, Germantown, TN)

Player	Position	School	Hometown	MLB Draft
Ben Davis	Catcher	Malvern Prep	Malvern, PA	1st Round – 2nd Pick of 1995 Draft (Padres)
Marshall Todd	Infielder	Oakland High School	Murfreesboro, TN	Attended Oakland High School (Tennessee ,1st round 13th pick Padres) *
Kerry Wood	Pitcher	Grand Prairie High School	Grand Prairie, TX	1st Round – 4th Pick of 1995 Draft (Cubs)
Michael Barrett	Infielder	Pace Academy	Atlanta, GA	1st Round – 28th Pick of 1995 Draft (Expos)
Chad Hermansen	Infielder	Green Valley High School	Henderson, NV	1st Round – 10th Pick of 1995 Draft (Pirates)
Jay Hood	Infielder	Germantown High School	Germantown, TN	Attended Georgia Tech *
Nate Rolison	Infielder	Petal High School	Petal, MS	2nd Round – 36th Pick of 1995 Draft (Marlins)
Shion Newton	Outfielder	Boys and Girls High School	Brooklyn, NY	9th Round – 6th Pick of 1995 Draft (Pirates)
Reggie Taylor	Outfielder	Newberry High School	Newberry, SC	1st Round – 14th Pick of 1995 Draft (Phillies)
Eric Valent	Outfielder	Canyon High School	Anaheim, CA	Attended UCLA *

- Hutchinson did not sign with the Braves, who drafted him with the 26th pick of the 1995 draft in the 1st round. Re-entered the MLB draft after attending Stanford and was selected with the 48th pick of the 1998 draft in the 2nd round by the Cardinals.
- Hood did not sign with the Twins, who drafted him with the 100th pick of the 1995 draft in the 4th round. Re-entered the MLB draft after attending Georgia Tech and was selected with the 181st pick of the 1998 draft in the 6th round by the Angels.
- Valent did not sign with the Tigers, who drafted him with the 714th pick of the 1995 draft in the 26th round. Re-entered the MLB draft after attending UCLA and was selected with the 42nd pick of the 1998 draft in the supplemental 1st round by the Phillies.

== Player, Coach, and Team of the Year (1998–2003) ==
See footnote
Note: The first player (in boldface) in each list is the Player of the Year for that season.

=== 1998 team ===
Coach of the Year: James Patrick (Clovis High School, Clovis, California)

Player	Position	School	Hometown	MLB Draft
Luis Adames	Catcher	Miami Central Senior High		Independent League Baseball Draft (not approved), 1998
Drew Henson	Infielder	Brighton High School	Brighton, MI	3rd Round – 97th Pick of 1998 Draft (Yankees) *
Josh Beckett	Pitcher	Spring High School	Spring, TX	Beckett was a junior in the 1998 season.
J. M. Gold	Pitcher	Toms River High School North	Toms River, NJ	1st Round – 13th Pick of 1998 Draft (Brewers)
Gerald Laird	Catcher	La Quinta High School	Westminster, CA	2nd Round – 45th Pick of 1998 Draft (A's)
Sean Burroughs	Infielder	Wilson High School	Long Beach, CA	1st Round – 9th Pick of 1998 Draft (Padres)
Felipe López	Infielder	Lake Brantley High School	Altamonte Springs, FL	1st Round – 8th Pick of 1998 Draft (Blue Jays)
Mark Teixeira	Infielder	Mount Saint Joseph High School	Baltimore, MD	Attended Georgia Tech *
Chip Ambres	Outfielder	West Brook Senior High School	Beaumont, TX	1st Round – 27th Pick of 1998 Draft (Marlins)
Raphael "Choo" Freeman	Outfielder	Dallas Christian School	Dallas, TX	Supplemental 1st Round – 36th Pick of 1998 Draft (Rockies)
Corey Patterson	Outfielder	Harrison High School	Kennesaw, GA	1st Round – 3rd Pick of 1998 Draft (Cubs)

- Henson attended Michigan on a football scholarship while playing in the Yankees minor league system. Retired from baseball in 2004 to pursue football career full-time.
- Teixeira did not sign with the Red Sox, who drafted him with the 265th pick of the 1998 draft in the 9th round. Re-entered the MLB draft after attending Georgia Tech and was selected 5th overall in the 2001 draft by the Rangers.

=== 1999 team ===
Coach of the Year: Rocky Manuel (Bellaire High School, Houston, TX)

Player	Position	School	Hometown	MLB Draft
Josh Beckett	**Pitcher**	**Spring High School**	Spring, TX	1st Round – 2nd Pick of 1999 Draft (Marlins)
Bobby Bradley	Pitcher	Wellington High School	West Palm Beach, FL	1st Round – 8th Pick of 1999 Draft (Pirates)
Ryan Christianson	Catcher	Arlington High School	Riverside, CA	1st Round – 11th Pick of 1999 Draft (Mariners)
Brennan King	Infielder	Oakland High School	Murfreesboro, TN	2nd Round – 69th Pick of 1999 Draft (Dodgers)
Pat Manning	Infielder	Mater Dei High School	Santa Ana, CA	3rd Round – 114th Pick of 1999 Draft (Braves)
Corey Myers	Infielder	Desert Vista High School	Phoenix, AZ	1st Round – 4th Pick of 1999 Draft (Diamondbacks)
Pat Osborn	Infielder	Bakersfield High School	Bakersfield, CA	22nd Round – 671st Pick of 1999 Draft (Angels) *
B.J. Garbe	Outfielder	Moses Lake High School	Moses Lake, WA	1st Round – 5th Pick of 1999 Draft (Twins)
Josh Hamilton	Outfielder	Athens Drive High School	Raleigh, NC	1st Round – 1st Pick of 1999 Draft (Devil Rays)
Cody Ross	Outfielder	Carlsbad High School	Carlsbad, NM	4th Round – 117th Pick of 1999 Draft (Tigers)

- Osborn did not sign with the Anaheim Angels (now the Los Angeles Angels) He re-entered the MLB draft after attending University of Florida and was selected 72nd Pick of the 2002 draft in the 2nd Round by the Indians.

=== 2000 team ===
Coach of the Year: Sam Blalock (Rancho Bernardo High School, San Diego, CA)

Player	Position	School	Hometown	MLB Draft
Matt Harrington	**Pitcher**	**Palmdale High School**	Palmdale, CA	1st Round – 7th Pick of 2000 Draft (Rockies) *
Scott Heard	Catcher	Rancho Bernardo High School	San Diego, CA	1st Round – 25th Pick of 2000 Draft (Rangers)
Rocco Baldelli	Outfielder	Bishop Hendricken High School	Warwick, RI	1st Round – 6th Pick of 2000 Draft (Devil Rays)
David Espinosa	Infielder	Gulliver Prep High School	Miami, FL	1st Round – 23rd Pick of 2000 Draft (Reds)
Mark Phillips	Pitcher	Hanover High School	Hanover, PA	1st Round – 9th Pick of 2000 Draft (Padres)
Shaun Boyd	Outfielder	Vista High School	Vista, CA	1st Round – 13th Pick of 2000 Draft (Cardinals)
Luis Montanez	Infielder	Coral Park High School	Miami, FL	1st Round – 3rd Pick of 2000 Draft (Cubs)
David Krynzel	Outfielder	Green Valley High School	Henderson, NV	1st Round – 11th Pick of 2000 Draft (Brewers)
**Adrián González**	Infielder	Eastlake High School	Chula Vista, CA	1st Round – 1st Pick of 2000 Draft (Marlins)

- Harrington did not sign with Rockies and re-enter in the MLB Draft the following year.

=== 2001 team ===
Coach of the Year: Kenny Kendrena (Bishop Amat High School, La Puente, CA)

Player	Position	School	Hometown	MLB Draft
**Joe Mauer**	**Catcher**	**Cretin-Derham Hall High School**	Saint Paul, MN	1st Round – 1st Pick of 2001 Draft (Twins)
Michael Wilson	Outfielder	Booker T. Washington High School	Tulsa, OK	2nd Round – 67th Pick of 2001 Draft (Mariners)
Mike Jones	Pitcher	Thunderbird High School	Phoenix, AZ	1st Round – 12th Pick of 2001 Draft (Brewers)
Danny Putnam	Outfielder	Rancho Bernardo High School	San Diego, CA	Attended Stanford *
**David Wright**	Infielder	Hickory High School	Chesapeake, VA	Supplemental 1st Round – 38th Pick of 2001 Draft (Mets)
Josh Burrus	Infielder	Joseph Wheeler High School	Marietta, GA	1st Round – 29th Pick of 2001 Draft (Braves)
Roscoe Crosby	Outfielder	**Union High School**	Union, SC	Attended Clemson – Football *
Gavin Floyd	Pitcher	Mount Saint Joseph College	Baltimore, MD	1st Round – 4th Pick of 2001 Draft (Phillies)
J. J. Hardy	Infielder	Sabino High School	Tucson, AZ	2nd Round – 56th Pick of 2001 Draft (Brewers)
Casey Kotchman	Infielder	Seminole High School	Seminole, FL	1st Round – 13th Pick of 2001 Draft (Angels)

- Putnam was not chosen in the 2001 MLB draft. Re-enter the MLB draft after attending Stanford University and was selected 36th pick of the 2004 draft in the Supplemental 1st Round by the (A's).
- Crosby was drafted as the 53rd Pick of the 2001 MLB draft of 2nd Round by Royals and attended Clemson University on a football scholarship. Played briefly in Royal's minor league system before deciding in returning to Clemson to pursue football full-time.

=== 2002 team ===
Coach of the Year: Rick Carpenter (Elkins High School, Missouri City, TX)

Player	Position	School	Hometown	MLB Draft
**B.J. Upton**	**Infielder**	**Greenbrier Christian Academy**	Chesapeake, VA	1st Round – 2nd Pick of the 2002 Draft (Devil Rays)
Micah Schilling	Infielder	Silliman Institute	Clinton, LA	Supplemental 1st Round – 41st Pick of the 2002 Draft (Indians)
Sergio Santos	Infielder	Mater Dei High School	Santa Ana, CA	1st Round – 27th Pick of the 2002 Draft (Diamondbacks)
**Denard Span**	Outfielder	Tampa Catholic High School	Tampa, FL	1st Round – 20th Pick of the 2002 Draft (Twins)
**Zack Greinke**	Pitcher	Apopka High School	Apopka, FL	1st Round – 6th Pick of the 2002 Draft (Royals)
Jeremy Hermida	Outfielder	Marietta High School	Marietta, GA	1st Round – 11th Pick of the 2002 Draft (Marlins)
**Scott Kazmir**	Pitcher	Cypress Falls High School	Houston, TX	1st Round – 15th Pick of the 2002 Draft (Mets)
Jeff Clement	Catcher	Marshalltown High School	Marshalltown, IA	Attended USC *
John Mayberry Jr.	Infielder	Rockhurst High School	Kansas City, MO	Attended Stanford *
Jeff Francoeur	Outfielder	Parkview High School	Lilburn, GA	1st Round – 23rd Pick of the 2002 Draft (Braves)

- Clement did not sign with Twins who drafted him with 362nd pick of the 2002 draft in the 12th round. Re-enter the MLB draft after attending USC and was selected 5th pick of the 2005 draft in the 1st Round by the Mariners.
- Mayberry did not sign with Mariners who drafted him with 28th pick of the 2002 draft in the 1st round. Re-enter the MLB draft after attending Stanford University and was selected 19th pick of the 2005 draft in the 1st Round by the Rangers.

=== 2003 team ===
Coach of the Year: Tom Meusborn (Chatsworth High School, Chatsworth, CA)

Player	Position	School	Hometown	MLB Draft
Delmon Young	**Outfielder**	**Camarillo High School**	Camarillo, CA	1st Round – 1st Pick of 2003 Draft (Devil Rays)
Chris Lubanski	Outfielder	Kennedy-Kenrick Catholic High School	Norristown, PA	1st Round – 5th Pick of 2003 Draft (Royals)
Lastings Milledge	Outfielder	Lakewood Ranch High School	Bradenton, FL	1st Round – 12th Pick of 2003 Draft (Mets)
Brandon Wood	Infielder	Horizon High School	Scottsdale, AZ	1st Round – 23rd Pick of 2003 Draft (Angels)
John Danks	Pitcher	Round Rock High School	Round Rock, TX	1st Round – 9th Pick of 2003 Draft (Rangers)
Jonathan Fulton	Infielder	George Washington High School	Danville, VA	3rd Round – 83rd Pick of 2003 Draft (Marlins)
Ian Stewart	Infielder	La Quinta High School	Westminster, CA	1st Round – 10th Pick of 2003 Draft (Rockies)
Jeff Allison	Pitcher	Veterans Memorial High School	Peabody, MA	1st Round – 16th Pick of 2003 Draft (Marlins)
Daric Barton	Catcher	Marina High School	Huntington Beach, CA	1st Round – 28th Pick of 2003 Draft (Cardinals)
Eric Duncan	Infielder	Seton Hall Preparatory School	West Orange, NJ	1st Round – 27th Pick of 2003 Draft (Yankees)

== Player, Coach, and Team of the Year (2004–present) ==
See footnote
Note: The 2004–2007 teams were selected by USA Today's Christopher Lawlor after consultation with analysts, pro scouts, coaches and writers.
Note: The first player (in boldface) in each list is the Player of the Year for that season.

=== 2004 team ===
Coach of the Year: Bobby Howard (Columbus High School, Columbus, GA)

Player	Position	School	Hometown	MLB Draft
**Homer Bailey**	**Pitcher**	**La Grange High School**	La Grange, TX	1st Round – 7th Pick of the 2004 Draft (Reds)
**Matt Bush**	Infielder	Mission Bay Senior High School	San Diego, CA	1st Round – 1st Pick of the 2004 Draft (Padres)
**Justin Upton**	Infielder	Great Bridge High School	Chesapeake, VA	Upton was only a Junior
Mark Rogers	Pitcher	Mt. Ararat High School	Harpswell, ME	1st Round – 5th Pick of the 2004 Draft (Brewers)
**Neil Walker**	Catcher	Pine-Richland High School	Gibsonia, PA	1st Round – 11th Pick of the 2004 Draft (Pirates)
**Dexter Fowler**	Outfielder	Milton High School	Alpharetta, GA	14th Round – 410th Pick of the 2004 Draft (Rockies)
Greg Golson	Outfielder	Connally High School	Austin, TX	1st Round – 21st Pick of the 2004 Draft (Phillies)
Michael Taylor	Outfielder	Apopka High School	Apopka, FL	Attended Stanford *
Chris Nelson	Infielder	Redan High School	Stone Mountain, GA	1st Round – 9th Pick of the 2004 Draft (Rockies)
**Trevor Plouffe**	Infielder	Crespi Carmelite High School	Encino, CA	1st Round – 20th Pick of the 2004 Draft (Twins)

Taylor was not chosen in the 2004 MLB draft. Re-enter the MLB draft after attending Stanford University and was selected 73rd Pick of the 2007 draft in the 5th Round by the Phillies.

=== 2005 team ===
Coach of the Year: Tony Rasmus, Russell County (Seale, Alabama)

Player	Position	School	Hometown	MLB Draft
**Justin Upton**	**Infielder**	**Great Bridge High School**	Chesapeake, VA	1st Round – 1st Pick of 2005 Draft (Diamondbacks)
**Jay Bruce**	Outfielder	West Brook Senior High School	Beaumont, TX	1st Round – 12th Pick of 2005 Draft (Reds)
C. J. Henry	Infielder	Putnam City High School	Oklahoma City, OK	1st Round – 17th Pick of 2005 Draft (Yankees) *
**Cameron Maybin**	Outfielder	T. C. Roberson High School	Asheville, NC	1st Round – 10th Pick of 2005 Draft (Tigers)
**Andrew McCutchen**	Outfielder	Fort Meade Middle-Senior High School	Fort Meade, FL	1st Round – 11th Pick of 2005 Draft (Pirates)
Mark Pawelek	Pitcher	Springville High School	Springville, UT	1st Round – 20th Pick of 2005 Draft (Cubs)
**Zach Putnam**	Infielder	Pioneer High School	Ann Arbor, MI	Attended Michigan *
Henry Sanchez	Infielder	Mission Bay Senior High School	San Diego, CA	Supplemental 1st Round – 37th Pick of 2005 Draft (Twins)
**Brandon Snyder**	Catcher	Westfield High School	Chantilly, VA	1st Round – 13th Pick of 2005 Draft (Orioles)
**Chris Volstad**	Pitcher	Palm Beach Gardens Community High School	Palm Beach Gardens, FL	1st Round – 16th Pick of 2005 Draft (Marlins)

- Henry briefly played in the minor league systems of the Yankees and Phillies before pursuing basketball full-time by attending colleges at Memphis and Kansas.
- Putnam did not sign with the Tigers, who drafted him with 1140th pick of the 2005 draft in the 38th round. Re-entered the MLB draft after attending University of Michigan and was selected 171st pick of the 2008 draft in the fifth round by the Indians.

=== 2006 team ===
Coach of the Year: Ron Eastman (The Woodlands High School, The Woodlands, TX)

Player	Position	School	Hometown	MLB Draft
**Clayton Kershaw**	**Pitcher**	**Highland Park High School**	Dallas, TX	1st Round – 7th Pick of 2006 Draft (Dodgers)
Hank Conger	Catcher	Huntington Beach High School	Huntington Beach, CA	1st Round – 25th Pick of 2006 Draft (Angels)
Adrian Cardenas	Infielder	Monsignor Pace High School	Opa-locka, FL	Supplemental 1st Round – 37th Pick of 2006 Draft (Phillies)
Chris Marrero	Infielder	Monsignor Pace High School	Opa-locka, FL	1st Round – 15th Pick of 2006 Draft (Nationals)
Preston Mattingly	Infielder	Central High School	Evansville, IN	Supplemental 1st Round – 31st Pick of 2006 Draft (Dodgers)
Billy Rowell	Infielder	Bishop Eustace Preparatory School	Pennsauken, NJ	1st Round – 9th Pick of 2006 Draft (Orioles)
Chris Parmelee	Outfielder	Chino Hills High School	Chino Hills, CA	1st Round – 20th Pick of 2006 Draft (Twins)
Jason Place	Outfielder	Wren High School	Piedmont, SC	1st Round – 27th Pick of 2006 Draft (Red Sox)
Travis Snider	Outfielder	Jackson High School	Mill Creek, WA	1st Round – 14th Pick of 2006 Draft (Blue Jays)
Kyle Drabek	Pitcher	The Woodlands High School	The Woodlands, TX	1st Round – 18th Pick of 2006 Draft (Phillies)

=== 2007 team ===
Coach of the Year: Jerry Boatner (West Lauderdale High School, Collinsville, MS)

Player	Position	School	Hometown	MLB Draft
**Rick Porcello**	**Pitcher**	**Seton Hall Preparatory School**	West Orange, NJ	1st Round – 27th Pick of 2007 Draft (Tigers)
Jarrod Parker	Pitcher	Norwell High School	Ossian, IN	1st Round – 9th Pick of 2007 Draft (Diamondbacks)
Devin Mesoraco	Catcher	Punxsutawney High School	Punxsutawney, PA	1st Round – 15th Pick of 2007 Draft (Reds)
Josh Vitters	Infielder	Cypress High School	Anaheim, CA	1st Round – 3rd Pick of 2007 Draft (Cubs)
Mike Moustakas	Infielder	Chatsworth High School	Chatsworth, CA	1st Round – 2nd Pick of 2007 Draft (Royals)
Kevin Ahrens	Infielder	Memorial High School	Houston, TX	1st Round – 16th Pick of 2007 Draft (Blue Jays)
Matt Dominguez	Infielder	Chatsworth High School	Chatsworth, CA	1st Round – 12th Pick of 2007 Draft (Marlins)
Jason Heyward	Outfielder	Henry County High School	McDonough, GA	1st Round – 14th Pick of 2007 Draft (Braves)
Ben Revere	Outfielder	Lexington Catholic High School	Lexington, KY	1st Round – 28th Pick of 2007 Draft (Twins)
Wendell Fairly	Outfielder	George County High School	Lucedale, Mississippi	1st Round – 29th Pick of 2007 Draft (Giants)

=== 2008 team ===
Coach of the Year: Todd Fitz-Gerald (American Heritage School, Plantation, FL)

Player	Position	School	Hometown	MLB Draft
**Jake Odorizzi**	**Pitcher**	**Highland High School**	Highland, IL	Supplemental 1st Round – 32nd Pick of 2008 Draft (Brewers)
Tim Beckham	Infielder	Griffin High School	Griffin, GA	1st Round – 1st Pick of 2008 Draft (Rays)
Gerrit Cole	Pitcher	Lutheran High School	Orange, CA	Attended UCLA *
Zach Collier	Outfielder	Chino Hills High School	Chino, CA	Supplemental 1st Round – 34th Pick of 2008 Draft (Phillies)
Aaron Hicks	Outfielder	Wilson High School	Long Beach, CA	1st Round – 14th Pick of 2008 Draft (Twins)
Destin Hood	Infielder	St. Paul's Episcopal School	Mobile, AL	2nd Round – 55th Pick of 2008 Draft (Nationals)
Eric Hosmer	Infielder	American Heritage School	Plantation, FL	1st Round – 3rd Pick of 2008 Draft (Royals)
Casey Kelly	Infielder	Sarasota High School	Sarasota, FL	1st Round – 30th Pick of 2008 Draft (Red Sox)
Tim Melville	Pitcher	Wentzville Holt High School	Wentzville, MO	4th Round – 115th Pick of 2008 Draft (Royals)
Kyle Skipworth	Catcher	Patriot High School	Riverside, CA	1st Round – 6th Pick of 2008 Draft (Marlins)

- Cole did not sign with the Yankees, who drafted him with 28th pick of the 2008 draft in the 1st round. Re-entered the MLB draft after attending UCLA and was selected 1st pick of the 2011 draft in the First round by the Pirates.

=== 2009 team ===
Coach of the Year: Phil Forbes (Menchville High School, Newport News, VA)

Player	Position	School	Hometown	MLB Draft
**Matt Hobgood**	**Pitcher**	**Norco High School**	Norco, CA	1st Round – 5th Pick of 2009 Draft (Orioles)
Jacob Turner	Pitcher	Westminster Christian Academy	St. Louis, MO	1st Round – 9th Pick of 2009 Draft (Tigers)
Jordan John	Pitcher	Calallen High School	Corpus Christi, TX	Attended Oklahoma *
Jeff Malm	Infielder	Bishop Gorman High School	Las Vegas, NV	5th Round – 169th Pick of 2009 Draft (Rays)
Wil Myers	Catcher	Wesleyan Christian Academy	High Point, NC	3rd Round – 91st Pick of 2009 Draft (Royals)
Donavan Tate	Outfielder	Cartersville High School	Cartersville, GA	1st Round – 3rd Pick of 2009 Draft (Padres)
Reggie Williams Jr.	Outfielder	Brooks-DeBartolo Collegiate High School	Tampa, FL	Attended Middle Georgia College *
Bobby Borchering	Infielder	Bishop Verot High School	Fort Myers, FL	1st Round – 16th Pick of 2009 Draft (Diamondbacks)
Scooter Gennett	Infielder	Sarasota High School	Sarasota, FL	16th Round – 496th Pick of 2009 Draft (Brewers)
Matt Davidson	Infielder	Yucaipa High School	Yucaipa, CA	Supplemental 1st Round – 35th Pick of 2009 Draft (Diamondbacks)

- John went undrafted in 2009 MLB draft and officially attended the Oklahoma in the fall of 2009. He re-entered the MLB draft after attending Oklahoma and was selected 214th pick of the 2012 draft in the 6th Round by the Tigers.
- Williams did not sign with Rangers who drafted him with 964th pick of the 2009 draft in the 32nd round. He re-entered the MLB draft after attending Middle Georgia College and was selected 319th pick of the 2010 draft in the 10th Round by the Cardinals.

=== 2010 team ===
Coach of the Year: Larry Knight (Sumrall High School, Sumrall, MS)

Player	Position	School	Hometown	MLB Draft
**Kaleb Cowart**	**Pitcher/Infielder**	**Cook County High School**	Adel, GA	1st Round – 18th Pick of 2010 Draft (Angels)
Ethan Bennett	Catcher	Farragut High School	Knoxville, TN	Attended Tennessee *
Kris Bryant	Infielder	Bonanza High School	Las Vegas, NV	Attended San Diego *
Dylan Covey	Pitcher	Maranatha High School	Pasadena, CA	Attended San Diego *
Kevin Cron	Catcher	Mountain Pointe High School	Phoenix, AZ	Cron was only a Junior *
Delino DeShields, Jr.	Outfielder	Woodward Academy	College Park, GA	1st Round – 8th Pick of 2010 Draft (Astros)
Taylor Lindsey	Outfielder	Desert Mountain High School	Scottsdale, AZ	Supplemental 1st Round – 37th Pick of 2010 Draft (Angels)
Manny Machado	Infielder	Brito High School	Miami, FL	1st Round – 3rd Pick of 2010 Draft (Orioles)
Josh Sale	Outfielder	Bishop Blanchet High School	Seattle, WA	1st Round – 17th Pick of 2010 Draft (Rays)
Jameson Taillon	Pitcher	The Woodlands High School	The Woodlands, TX	1st Round – 2nd Pick of 2010 Draft (Pirates)

- Bennett went undrafted in 2010 MLB draft and officially attending Tennessee in the fall of 2010. Will be eligible to re-enter the MLB Draft in 2013.
- Bryant did not sign with Blue Jays who drafted him with 546th pick of the 2010 draft in the 18th round by officially attending University of San Diego in the fall of 2010. Will be eligible to re-enter the MLB Draft in 2013.
- Covey did not sign with Brewers who drafted him with 14th pick of the 2010 draft in the 1st round by officially attending University of San Diego in the fall of 2010. Will be eligible to re-enter the MLB Draft in 2013.

=== 2011 team ===
Coach of the Year: Rich Bielski (Archbishop McCarthy High School, Fort Lauderdale, FL)

Player	Position	School	Hometown	MLB Draft
Dylan Bundy	Pitcher/Infielder	Owasso High School	Owasso, OK	1st Round – 4th Pick of 2011 Draft (Orioles)
Kevin Cron	Catcher / Pitcher	Mountain Pointe High School	Phoenix, AZ	Attended TCU *
Archie Bradley	Infielder / Pitcher	Broken Arrow High School	Broken Arrow, OK	1st Round – 7th Pick of 2011 Draft ( Diamondbacks)
Francisco Lindor	Infielder	Montverde Academy	Montverde, FL	1st Round – 9th Pick of 2011 Draft (Indians)
Trevor Mitsui	Infielder	Shorewood High School	Shoreline, WA	Attended Washington *
Josh Bell	Outfielder	Jesuit College Preparatory School	Dallas, TX	2nd Round – 61st Pick of 2011 Draft (Pirates)
Bubba Starling	Outfielder	Gardner Edgerton High School	Gardner, KS	1st Round – 5th Pick of 2011 Draft (Royals)
Blake Swihart	Catcher	Cleveland High School	Rio Rancho, NM	1st Round – 26th Pick of 2011 Draft (Red Sox)
Jordan Montgomery	Pitcher	Sumter High School	Sumter, SC	Attended South Carolina *
Henry Owens	Pitcher	Edison High School	Huntington Beach, CA	Supplemental 1st Round – 36th Pick of 2011 Draft (Red Sox)

- Cron did not sign with the Mariners, who drafted him with the 92nd pick of the 2011 draft in the 3rd round. He chose instead to attend TCU in the fall of 2011, and will be eligible to re-enter the MLB Draft in 2014.
- Mitsui did not sign with the Rays, who drafted him with the 390th pick of the 2011 draft in the 12th round. He chose to attend Washington in the fall of 2011, and will be eligible to re-enter the MLB Draft in 2014.
- Montgomery went undrafted in the 2011 MLB Draft. He chose to attend South Carolina in the fall of 2011, and will be eligible to re-enter the MLB Draft in 2014.

=== 2012 team ===
Coach of the Year: Nick Day (Bishop Gorman High School, Las Vegas, NV)

Player	Position	School	Hometown	MLB Draft
**Lance McCullers Jr**	**Pitcher / infielder**	**Jesuit High School**	Tampa, FL	Supplemental 1st Round – 41st Pick of the 2012 Draft (Astros)
Byron Buxton	Pitcher / outfielder	Appling County High School	Baxley, GA	1st Round – 2nd Pick of the 2012 Draft (Twins)
Courtney Hawkins	Pitcher / outfielder	Carroll High School	Corpus Christi, TX	1st Round – 13th Pick of the 2012 Draft (White Sox)
Gavin Cecchini	Infielder	Barbe High School	Lake Charles, LA	1st Round – 12th Pick of the 2012 Draft (Mets)
James Kaprielian	Pitcher	Beckman High School	Irvine, CA	Attended UCLA *
Joey Gallo	Infielder	Bishop Gorman High School	Las Vegas, NV	Supplemental 1st Round – 39th Pick of the 2012 Draft (Rangers)
Rob Kaminsky	Pitcher	Saint Joseph Regional High School	Montvale, NJ	Kaminsky was only a Junior
Taylor Hawkins	Infielder	Carl Albert High School	Midwest City, OK	Attended Oklahoma *
Ty Moore	Pitcher / outfielder	Mater Dei High School	Santa Ana, CA	Attended UCLA *
Wyatt Mathisen	Pitcher / infielder	Calallen High School	Corpus Christi, TX	2nd Round – 69th Pick of the 2012 Draft (Pirates)

- Kaprelian did not sign with the Mariners, who drafted him with the 1211th pick of the 2012 draft in the 40th round. He chose instead to attend UCLA in the fall of 2012, and wasn't drafted by the New York Yankees in the first round of the MLB Draft in 2015.
- T. Hawkins did not sign with the Rays, who drafted him with the 392nd pick of the 2012 draft in the 12th round. He chose instead to attend Oklahoma in the fall of 2012, and will be eligible to re-enter the MLB Draft in 2015.
- Moore did not sign with the Yankees, who drafted him with the 787th pick of the 2012 draft in the 25th round. He chose instead to attend UCLA in the fall of 2012, and will be eligible to re-enter the MLB Draft in 2015.

== See also ==
- Baseball awards § U.S. high-school baseball
- ABCA/Rawlings High School All-America Baseball Team
- USA Today All-USA High School Basketball Team
- USA Today All-USA High School Football Team
- USA Today Minor League Player of the Year Award
