= Dorothy Hosmer =

American photojournalist

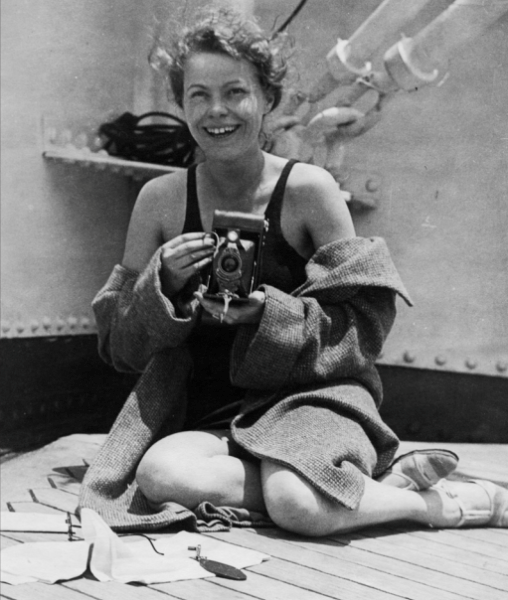
- Dorothy Hosmer Aboard SS President Roosevelt Bound for Europe, 1936
- Born: Dorothy Ann Hosmer; April 25, 1911; Wauwatosa, Wisconsin
- Died: April 29, 2008 (aged 97); Redlands, California
- Known for: Photography, travel writing
- Spouse: Frederick Lee (m. 1949)

Dorothy Hosmer (1911–2008) was an American photographer and travel writer, known as the first woman freelance contributor to the National Geographic magazine. During a career that extended from the 1930s through the 1940s, she published her work in geographic and travel magazines as well as news media and books.

Born in Wisconsin, she grew up in Illinois, Florida, Texas, and New Jersey as her father moved his architectural practice from one location to another. In 1936 she made a spur-of-the-moment decision to travel by bicycle through central and southern Europe with an eye to preparing illustrated articles about her encounters along the way. In 1938 National Geographic published one of her articles, and over the next few years published three more. The first three covered her travels in Poland, Romania, and the western parts of Ukraine that were then in Romania. The last of them, which appeared four months before the United States entered World War II, covered her travels in the Aegean Islands of the Eastern Mediterranean. She continued to publish photos and articles while living in Mexico and Guatemala during the years of the war and its aftermath. Hosmer's career as a photographer and travel writer ended soon after her marriage in 1949. Late in life she told an interviewer that she still knew five languages, including Esperanto, and recalled about half the Italian in which she had previously known.

== Education ==
Hosmer completed primary school in Wilmette, Illinois. She was in Sarasota, Florida, in 1929, when she graduated from high school. The following year she lived in Houston, Texas, attending Rice Institute (later Rice University) and in 1931 she completed the secretarial course at the Scudder School in Manhattan.

== Career ==
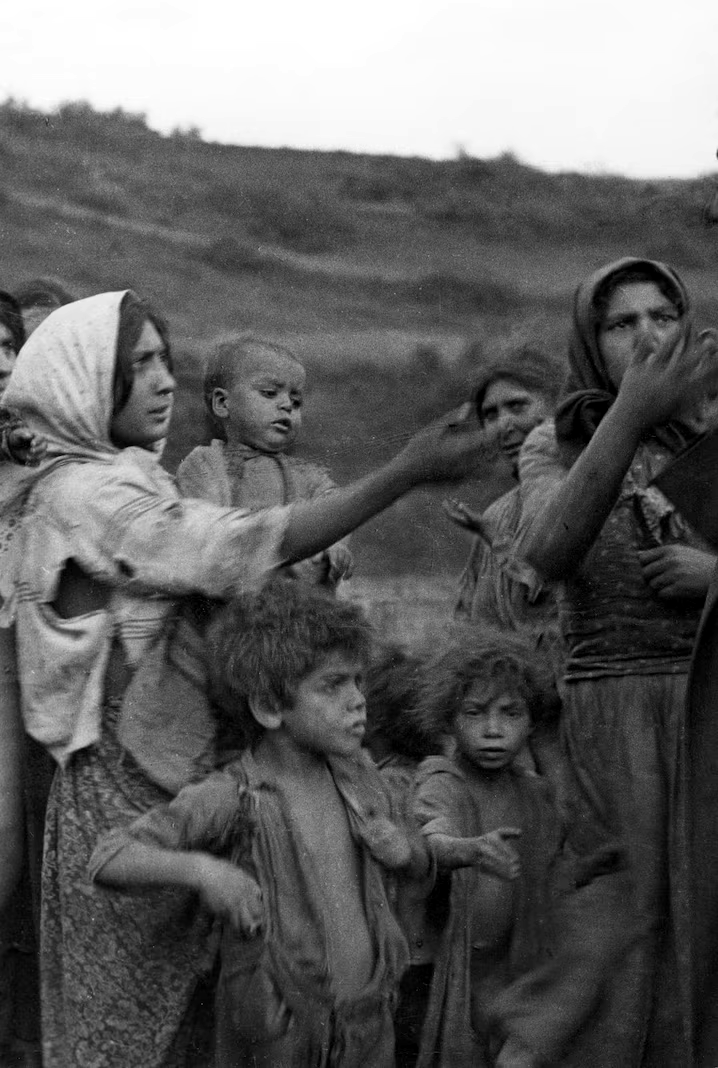
Dorothy Hosmer, Gypsy Women and Children in Transylvania, about 1937

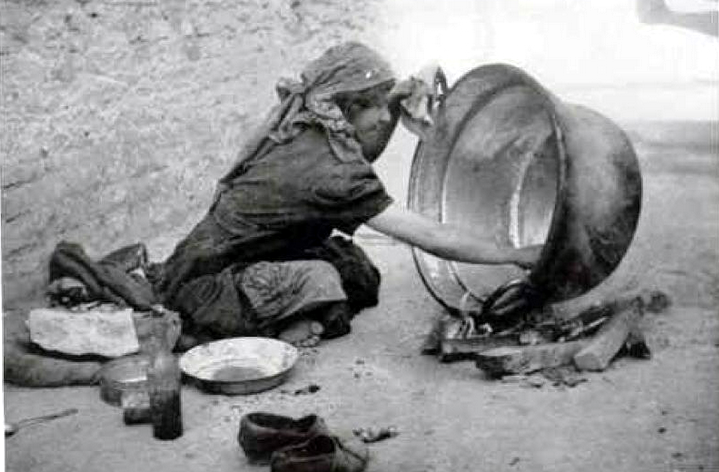
Dorothy Hosmer, Gypsy Woman Cleaning a Basin, about 1937

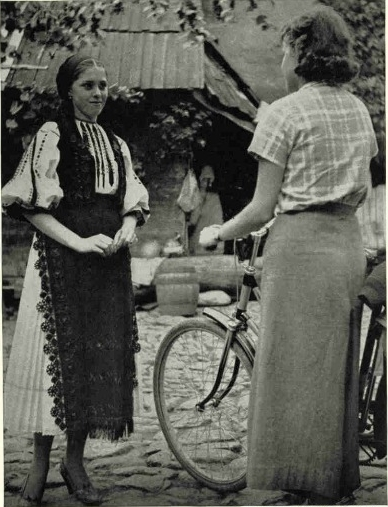
Attributed to Dorothy Hosmer, A Study in Skirts — And Centuries Lie Between, about 1937

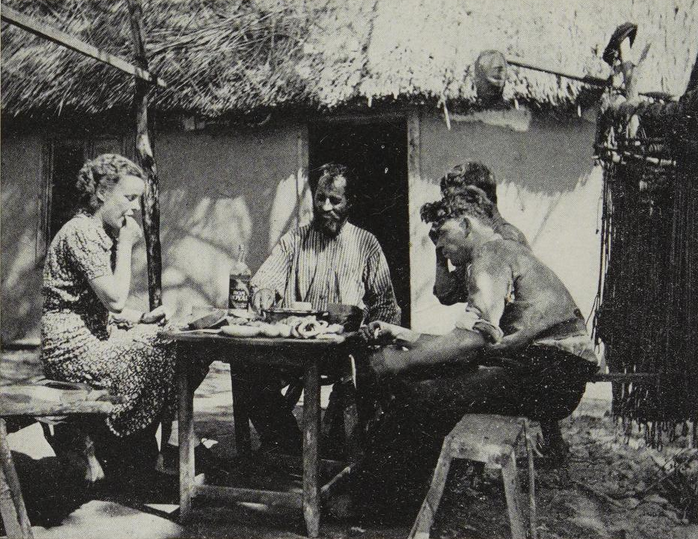
Attributed to Dorothy Hosmer, A Lipovan Lunch is a Frugal Meal, about 1939

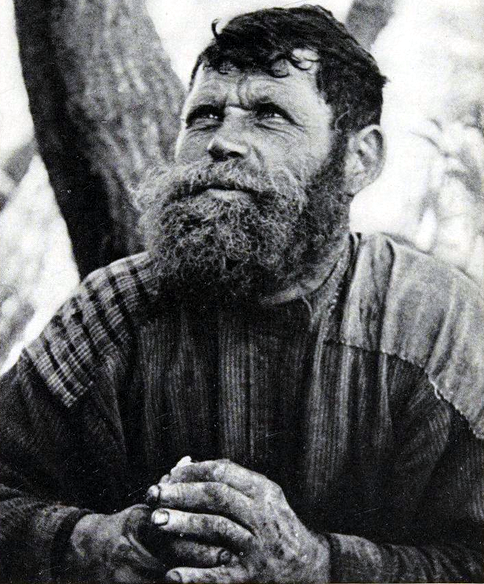
Dorothy Hosmer, Out of Little, He Makes Enough, about 1939

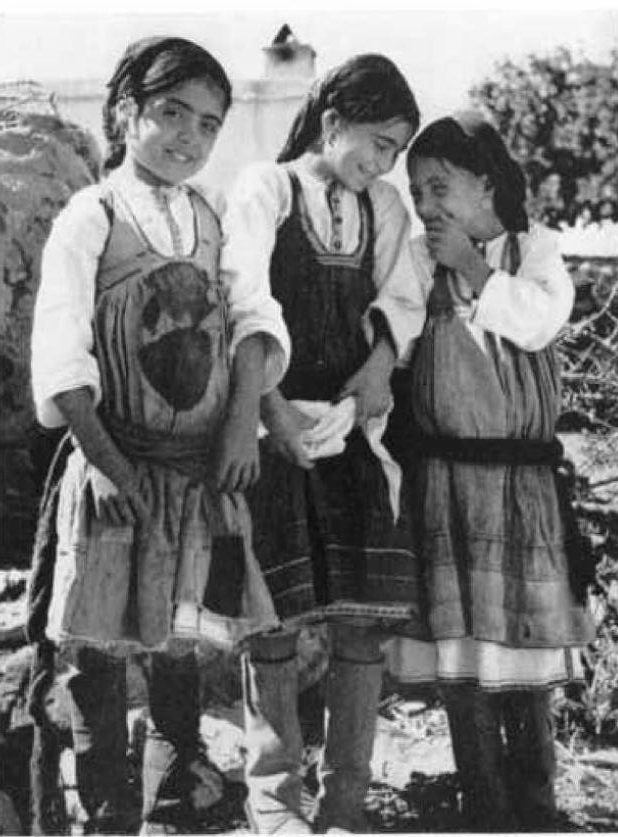
Dorothy Hosmer, The Three Graces of Embona: Thrifty Island Folk Wear Old Clothes Till They Fall Apart, but Smiles are Gay, about 1940

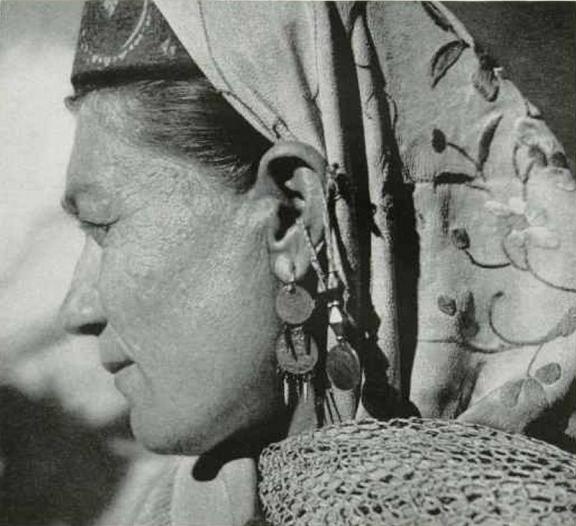
Dorothy Hosmer, Triple-pierced Ears Carry Vanity's Burden on Castelrosso, about 1940

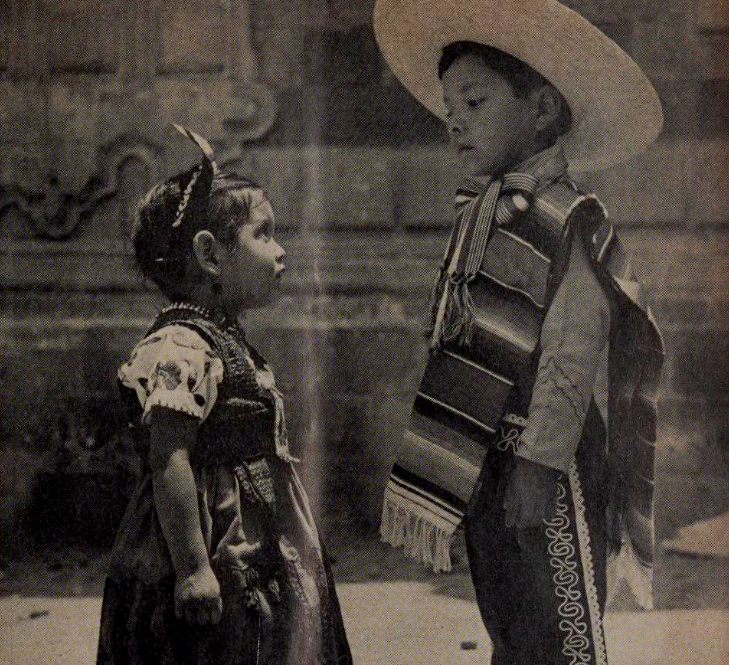
Dorothy Hosmer, The Hero-worshipping Young Miss with Lacquer Earrings Wears Her Rebozo Draped in the Style of the China Poblana, about 1946

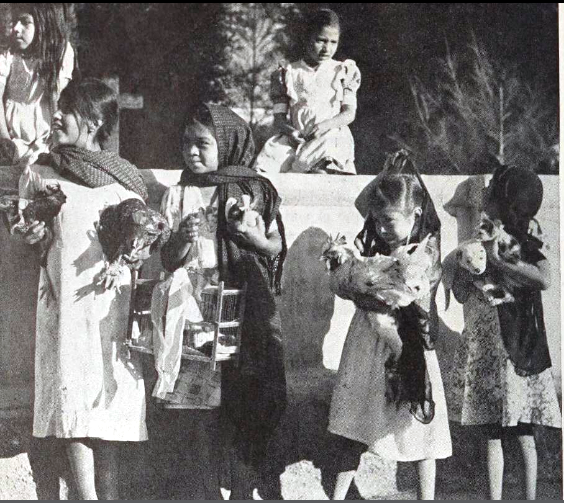
Dorothy Hosmer, Small Fry Bring Pigeons, Chickens, Dogs, and Cats for Annual Blessing of Animals in Mexican Village of Ajijic, about 1950

In 1936 Hosmer obtained visas for travel to Europe and Asia and paid $89 for a third-class ticket on the SS President Roosevelt to cross the Atlantic. She planned to spend three months in Europe, then proceed to India and onward to East Asia, but early in July, just before the ship landed, she gave up that plan. Having come to believe, as she later said, "that traveling was something you had to take as it came along if you wanted to get anything out of it", she decided to commence what she called a "zigzag route across the face of Europe."

In March 1937 The New York Times published the first of her travel narratives. Called "Dubrovnik: Cruise Goal", it described the Croatian city, as a vacation destination. She explained: "That this medieval Ragusa emerged from centuries of oblivion is due in part to the Spanish civil war, which set many a sun-loving sybarite adrift in search of a new Arcadia. Then, too, the former Prince of Wales and his party, numbering his future Duchess, sailed the Adriatic. Spying the towering ramparts of Dubrovnik, they set foot ashore and tourist history was made." A few months later 1937 Hosmer found herself in Switzerland where, as she later wrote, she "pushed [her] loaded cycle in a driving rain up to the snow-patched summit of the Simplon Pass." From there she traveled to Austria and onward to Poland, where, in Kraków, she acted on an idea given to her by a friend for a journey south through Poland and Romania to the Danube Delta on the Black Sea.

Hosmer traveled slowly, mostly on her own and mostly by bicycle, and remained for weeks at a time in some places and only a day or two in others. She meandered south from Kraków to a point close to the Polish border with Czechoslovakia, then east through Bukovina to a point close to the border of the Ukrainian Soviet Socialist Republic, and from there south through the Carpathian Mountains to Transylvania, thence onward to Bucharest. Leaving Bucharest, she traveled to a small town on the Danube River where she boarded a boat that took her downstream to the delta. Although Eastern Europe faced significant political unrest in 1938 and World War II began in 1939, Hosmer encountered little military activity and noted no widespread anxiety among locals.

Aware of potential challenges as a solo female traveler, Hosmer credited her time in Western Europe with teaching her how to navigate the "inevitable misunderstandings" that arose when locals encountered "girls without chaperones". She did not know it at the time, but on reading a query she had sent about publishing an account of the trip, an associate editor of National Geographic said the magazine should not endorse the idea "that it was all right to travel the world on one’s own". As she pedaled through Poland and Romania, some of the people she met showed concern about her safety and volunteered to accompany her as "protectors". "Against what", she said, "I couldn't say." In addition to the caution she had learned during her first year abroad and this volunteer protection, her American birth seemed also to shield her from harm. Hosmer often found locals respectful and curious about American life. One Yugoslav Muslim remarked that her "woman's independence was tolerated because she came from a country 'too young to know better'."

Before setting off toward Romania, Hosmer spent a few weeks in Kraków where she explored the ancient Jewish quarter and visited its secondhand market. Taking advice from people she met in Kraków, she cycled south along the Raba River valley to Rabka-Zdrój and onward across the Tatra Mountains in Western Carpathians.

She later said that she knew none of the languages she heard spoken throughout her travels. With perseverance, she managed to overcome the language barrier partly through gestures and the bits and pieces of Ukrainian and Romanian. She also picked up language skills as she went and often received translation help from bilingual Poles and Romanians who had emigrated to the United States and later returned to their homelands. She said she tended to be welcomed by locals as a native-born American and thus more authentic than the returned emigrants in their midst. If locals could not be found who spoke English, there might be someone who knew German, a language she had studied in school.

In an article she published in National Geographic in 1938, Hosmer said she had planned her route through southern Poland with help from English- and German-speaking people she met in Kraków. As she proceeded, though she knew only a handful of Polish words, she found local people to be eager to give her what help they could because, as she said, they were incredulous that she "had left America, the Land of Promise, to visit their country". Examining the bicycle she was using, one man, who had himself undertaken a bicycle tour of England, took her to a local shop and directed the assembly of a true touring cycle with a Polish frame and other components from various western European countries.

In traveling through Romania Hosmer lacked advice on where she should go, did not even have a map to guide her, and, as she said, knew only "that the Black Sea was my goal." Cycling along river valleys and crisscrossing mountain passes, she later wrote, "No invader ever had a worse time getting over this country than I on my cycle, along roads, practically impossible for motorists, on which oxcarts creaked over the stones." Although she sometimes slept outdoors, she usually managed to find shelter of some kind, but in some cases that meant sleeping on hard boards or a bed of straw and the shelter might only be a thatched-walled hut or the open hull of a fisherman's rowboat. Writing of a night spent in a community on the border between Poland and a part of Ukraine that was then in Romania, she wrote, "I cycled the lanes bordered by white fences and oriental lychgates until I found a likely thatched cottage in which to spend the night. The couple brought in from the fields spoke only Ukrainian, but after I had admired their baby and had been approved by the neighbors, they hospitably took me in." During the night she heard a mouse burrowing in the straw-filled mattress under her ear and learned the next day that a mouse in one's pillow foretold strange new things and events.

Some of her accommodations were less rustic, although no less exotic. She spent a night in an orphanage, several in monasteries, and, most memorably, spent five weeks moving from one estate to another by Hungarian aristocrats living in Transylvania. In time, she grew accustomed to the attention she received. In rural hamlets she often received a hospitable welcome from local residents. After a night in a thatched hut in the Danube Delta, where she was treated with great kindness and given the family's only bed, she learned that locals considered guests to be sent by God.

For the most part, Hosmer traveled by bicycle. While crossing the Carpathian Mountains, she once took a ride offered by the engineer in the cab of a locomotive that was pulling a freight train up a long, steep rise and on another occasion rode a mountain pony to get to a remote mountain hamlet. A farm woman once carried her piggyback over a stream toward an estate in Transylvania and on another occasion a man she met carried her bike and pack for her as she traversed a path beside a mountain stream. She went down the Dunajec River Gorge on a log raft and made a trip down the Dniester River in a folding boat.

Hosmer encountered people in many of the national and ethnic groups that then peopled Eastern Europe, including Romanians, Ukrainians, Hungarians, Germans, Russians, Jews, and Gypsies. She met students and professors; priests, monks, and nuns; fishermen of sponges and of sturgeon; and many farmers.

In 1940, Hosmer entered Germany, hoping to find her way home via Denmark, but was forced to go to Italy when naval mines in the Baltic Sea lanes brought outbound travel to a halt. From Florence she went to Brindisi and from there sailed to Rhodes and the adjacent Aegean Islands, seeking, as she put it, a refuge from the war. The islands, then administered by Italy and now part of Greece, were home to Greek-speaking Orthodox Christians, Turkish-speaking Muslims, Spanish-speaking Sephardic Jews, and Italian-speaking Roman Catholics. She found she was able to communicate with some of the islands' residents using her modest knowledge of Italian and, as she had in her earlier travels, picked up phrases in other languages to use in communicating with others. She was transported within the Aegean by a variety of craft, including the Fiume, an inter-island passenger boat said to have once been fitted out as a yacht for Archduke Franz Ferdinand of Austria, a sailboat with motor auxiliary used for sponge fishing, and other local caĩques. One of these boats left her briefly stranded without her luggage on one island, forcing her to take a cargo boat bound for the same port. Hosmer sometimes slept aboard a boat but more often on land, taking what each locale brought her, sometimes staying in a monastery and other times spending nights in the homes of local residents. On Patmos, where John of Patmos was said to have received the Book of Revelation, she stayed part of the time in a monastery and part in a private home. About the private home, she wrote, "The stranger has no lodging problem here. You simply ask for two feet of space on the bed shelf, a wide platform taking up nearly half the one-room houses. On it members of the family stretch themselves like cod drying in a row, papa, mamma, and from the eldest down to the youngest. All are fully dressed. I slept at the end of such a line next to a plump three-year-old daughter. Tobacco, drying from the rafters, perfumed my dreams."

Hosmer said she received telegrams from American consulate offices warning her about unsafe conditions but otherwise rarely alluded to the earthshaking events taking place around her. Upon returning to American soil in 1940, she remarked to a reporter, "Three months after I publish an article about a country, something happens there." The context suggests she was mainly thinking about the Soviet takeover of parts of Romania in June and July of that year but they were only some of the many areas through which she pedaled that had come under German or Soviet control. In June 1939, while she was staying in a mountain hut on what was then the border between Poland and Soviet Ukraine, she found the remnants of a battle from an earlier time and wrote, "Meditating on how long it would be before another generation of soldiers would face each other on these skyline peaks, I sat there for hours in the rolling mists till the horn of a shepherd boy who had been sent out to search for me brought me back to the reality of chimerical peace."

Hosmer recorded only a few encounters with politicians or army officers. On one occasion she was present at a military ceremony honoring the 16th birthday of Romania's crown prince Michael and on another she had to prove she was not a spy after returning from a flight she had taken with a gallant young pilot of the Polish air force. Not long before her return home, she had contact with the Italian dictator Benito Mussolini. She explained the incident when she landed in San Francisco in 1940 saying he had given her a new bicycle after learning that someone had stolen a bicycle wheel from her.

Hosmer was the first woman freelance contributor to the National Geographic magazine. In 1937, before traveling to Poland, she wrote the editors of the National Geographic proposing that they publish illustrated reports of her travels. Overruling the objections of an associate editor, the editor-in-chief, Gilbert Hovey Grosvenor accepted her proposal and the magazine subsequently published three articles:

• "Pedaling Through Poland: An American Girl Free-wheels Alone from Kraków, and its Medieval Byways, Toward Ukraine's Restive Borderland" (v. 75, n. 6, June 1939, 739-775)

• "Caviar Fishermen of Romania: From Valcov, "Little Venice" of the Danube Delta, Bearded Russian Exiles Go Down to the Sea", (v. 77, n. 3, March 1940, 407-434)

• "Rhodes & Italy's Aegean Islands" (v. 79, n. 4, April 1941)

After she had returned from Europe, Hosmer placed an account of her visit to Patmos in New York-based Travel magazine. In July 1941, some five months before the United States entered World War II, Travel published a short article recounting her visit to the Monastery of Saint John the Theologian on Patmos. She called the place "a sanctuary of peace in the midst of the holocaust of war sweeping the eastern Mediterranean." In August, she provided photos for a Travel article on Albania.

After her father's death in 1943, Hosmer moved to Mexico where she worked for a time at the U.S. Office of Inter-American Affairs. In the mid- and late-1940s she traveled widely in that country and Guatemala. During this period she continued to submit work for publication in Travel magazine, including a photo essay on a Corpus Christi celebration in Mexico (1946), and a single photo from that occasion a year later, as well as photos that accompanied an article on Guatemala in 1948. In 1946 she published a photo essay in an annual tourist guide entitled Modern Mexico. Called "Ajijic", the essay described the fishing village of that name which was then becoming known as an artist community.

Hosmer also had photos of Mexico and Guatemala published in other magazines, including a publication of the Organization of American States called Americas, the London-based Geographical Magazine, and a short-lived, independently published magazine called United Nations World. Her photos appeared in two books as well, one showing the blessing of the animals in Mexico (El Camino Real by Edith Moore Jarrett; Houghton Mifflin, 1946) and the other showing a woodworker in a mountain town of Guatemala (A World View, Silver Burdett Co. 1949). Other publications in which Hosmer's photos appeared included newspapers (The New York Times, Seattle Times, Toronto Star), and at least one mass-market weekly (Business Week).

In 2011, family members donated more than 6,000 of Hosmer's photos and negatives to the Sweeney Art Gallery at USC.

== Personal life and family ==
Hosmer was born in Wauwatosa, Wisconsin, on April 25, 1911. Her birth name was Dorothy Ann Hosmer. Her mother, Edith May Peterson Hosmer (1883–1984) was a homemaker. Her father (1880–1940) was a self-employed architect. She had two sisters, Jean Elizabeth Hosmer (1908–1928) and Jessie M. Hosmer (born 1914). The family moved frequently during Hosmer's childhood. They were in Wilmette, Illinois, when she graduated from primary school They were in Sarasota, Florida, when she graduated in 1929 from high school. They were in Houston, Texas, when she completed a year in Rice University (then called the Rice Institute). In about 1931, after the family had moved to Orange, New Jersey, she completed a year-long secretarial course at the Scudder School for Girls in New York. Her first job after leaving school was at the National City Bank of New York in Manhattan.

During her travels she occasionally took jobs to earn income. Her jobs included secretarial work for an Italian author during 1938 and work as a motion picture traveling supervisor for the office of U.S. Office of Inter-American Affairs during 1940. After her marriage in 1949 she again worked as a secretary. That marriage took place in Puerto Rico where the couple, Hosmer and her husband Frederick Lee, were then living. Hosmer and Lee had a son, Kerry (1950–1982). After her husband's death Hosmer moved back to Redlands, California, a place she had adopted as her home base following her father's death.

Late in life Hosmer told an interviewer that she still knew five languages, including Esperanto, and recalled about half the Italian in which she had previously known.

Hosmer died in Redlands on April 29, 2008.
