= Schechter Bergen =

School in New Jersey, United States

Coordinates: 40.938217°N 74.01726°W

Schechter Bergen is a Coeducational Jewish Day School at 275 McKinley Avenue in New Milford, New Jersey, United States. The school is a member of the New Jersey Association of Independent Schools. It enrolls 434 students from age 3 through 8th grade, has a staff count of 93 from both New York (state) and New Jersey.

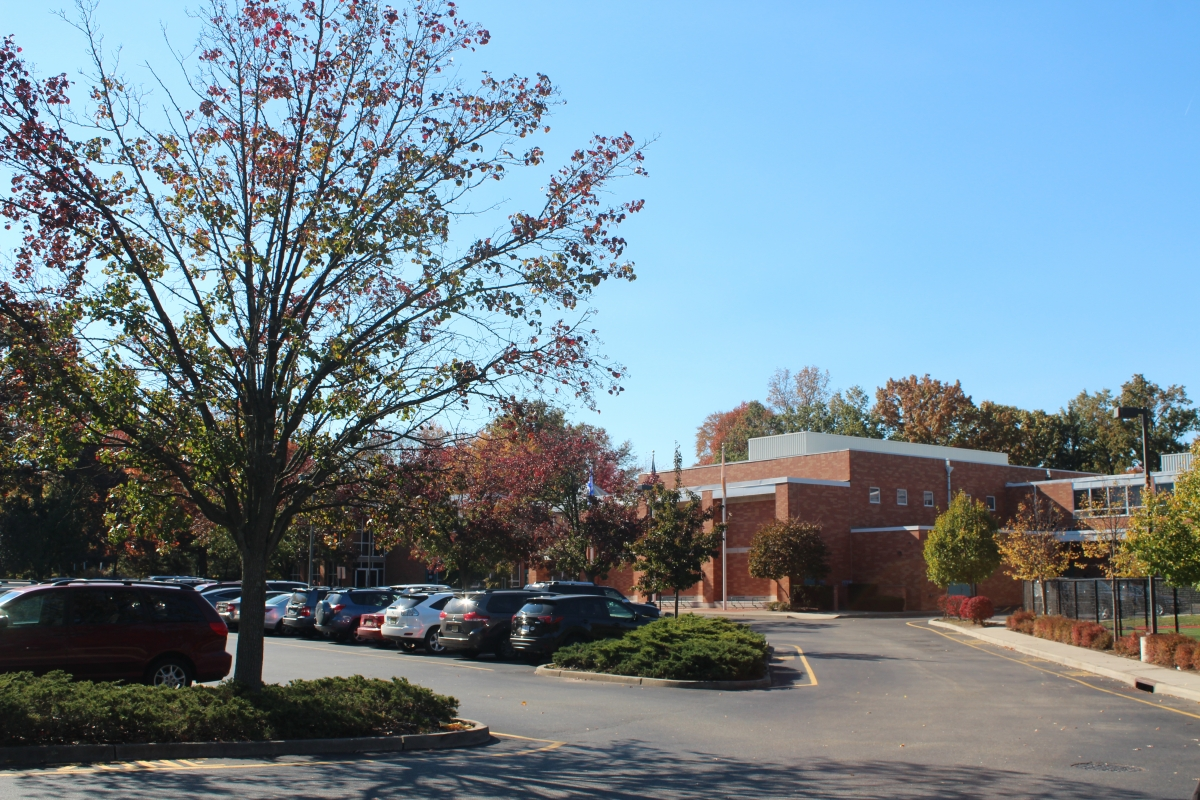
Campus entrance

== History ==
In 1973–74, the Solomon Schechter Day School of Bergen County opened.

== Campus ==
The school has an indoor basketball court with stage, fitness center, library, Holocaust Resource Room, Innovation lab with 3D printers, art and music rooms, computer lab, Beit Midrash, and kosher cafeteria. The campus also includes outdoor basketball courts, AstroTurf soccer fields, gaga pit, vegetable gardens and monarch butterfly sanctuary.

== Administration ==
- Head of School - Steve Freedman
- Director of Education and Judaic Studies - Ricky Stamler-Goldberg*
- Director of Early Childhood - Gena Khelemsky
- Director of Jewish Learning & Life - Dr. Zach Mann
- Director of Instruction & Learning - Liav Shapiro
- School Psychologist - Ilana Kustanowitz
- Dean of 5-8 Kehillot Students & Athletic Director - Garry Schragenheim
- Director of Language Arts & Humanities - Beryl Bresgi
- Chief Operating Officer - Ronni Brenner
- Director of Development & Advancement - Michelle Weinraub
- Director of Admissions, Enrollment, & Advancement - Charlotte Carter

== Notable alumni ==
- Jack Antonoff (born 1984), musician for the bands fun. and Bleachers
- Dan Colen (born 1979), artist
- Jeremy Feigenbaum
- Dave Jeser (born 1977), television writer
- Rob Kaminsky (born 1994), pitcher drafted by the St. Louis Cardinals with the 28th pick in the 2013 MLB Draft, made his major league debut in 2020
- Ari Levine (born 1984), Grammy-nominated songwriter and record producer, one-third of the trio The Smeezingtons
- Elijah Wolfson (born 1985), journalist and editorial director of TIME
