= Rob Kaminsky =

American baseball player (born 1994)

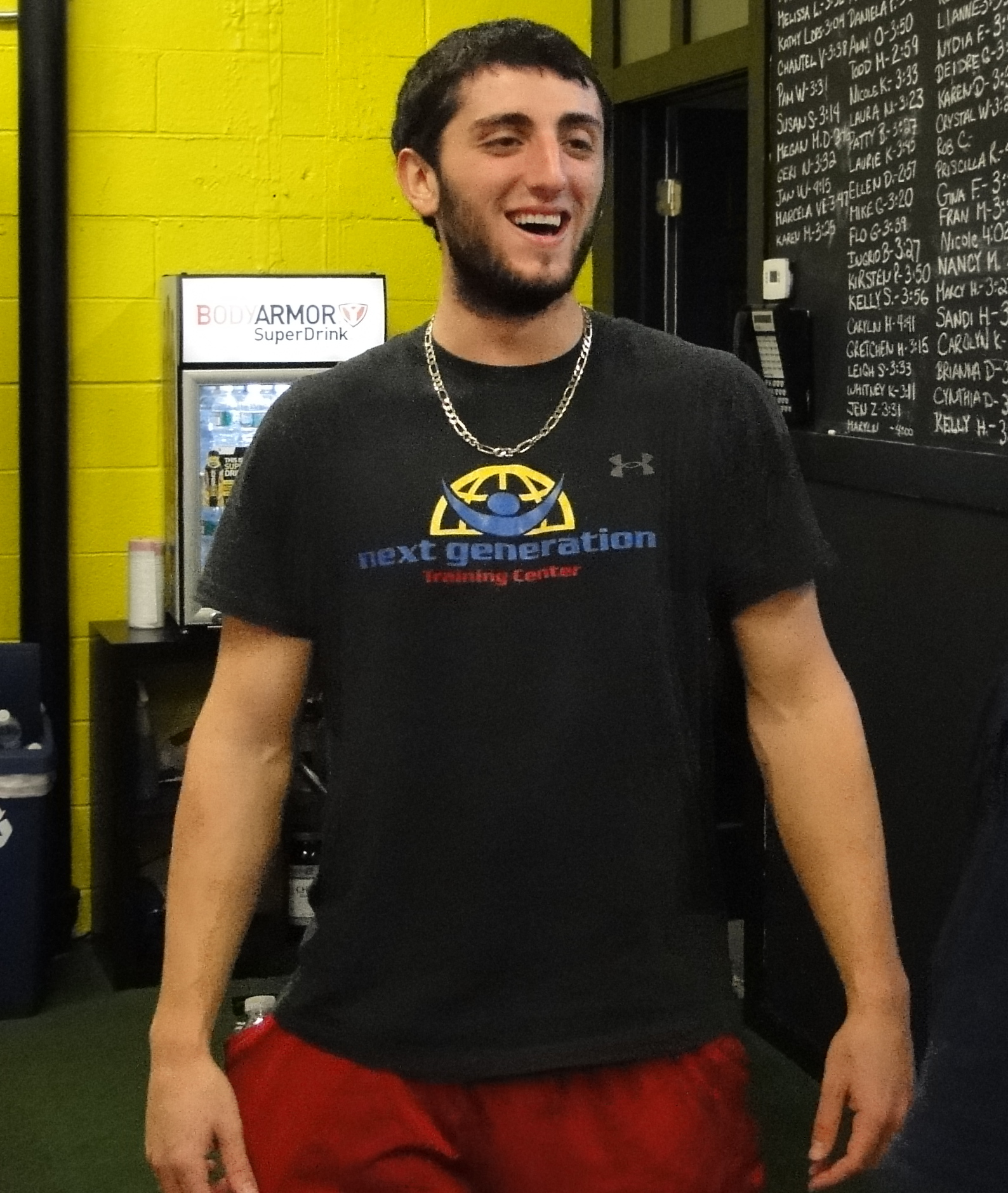
- Kaminsky in 2013

Free agent
- Pitcher
- Born: September 2, 1994 (age 32); Englewood Cliffs, New Jersey, U.S.
- Bats: Right Throws: Left

MLB debut
- August 16, 2020, for the St. Louis Cardinals

MLB statistics (through 2020 season)
- Win–loss record: 0–0
- Earned run average: 1.93
- Strikeouts: 3
- Stats at Baseball Reference

Teams
- St. Louis Cardinals (2020)

Robert Harris Kaminsky (born September 2, 1994) is an American professional baseball pitcher who is a free agent. He has previously played in Major League Baseball (MLB) for the St. Louis Cardinals.

In high school, Kaminsky was the Gatorade New Jersey Baseball Player of the Year in both 2012 and 2013, named to the 2012 USA Today All-USA Team, and a 2013 Baseball America Preseason First Team All-American. He was drafted by the Cardinals at the age of 18 in the first round of the 2013 Major League Baseball draft, 28th overall. He made his major league debut for the Cardinals in August 2020. Kaminsky pitched for Team Israel in the 2023 World Baseball Classic.

== Early life ==
Kaminsky was born in and grew up in Englewood Cliffs, New Jersey. His parents are Donna Kaminsky, and Alan Kaminsky, a civil litigator for Lewis Brisbois Bisgaard & Smith in New York City. He has two older siblings, Joseph and Anna, and his grandfather is Bernard Kaminsky. Kaminsky is Jewish, and his bar mitzvah was based on a baseball theme. His boyhood hero was left-handed pitcher Sandy Koufax, and he said Koufax "stood up for what he believed in" when Koufax decided not to pitch Game 1 of the 1965 World Series because it was on Yom Kippur.

He is nearly completely ambidextrous; Kaminsky writes, throws a football, and shoots a basketball right-handed, but throws a baseball left-handed. In Little League, he sometimes threw left-handed and sometimes threw right-handed. He learned how to switch-hit when he was around 10 years old.

Kaminsky attended Solomon Schechter Day School of Bergen County, a Jewish day school, through eighth grade.

== High school ==
Kaminsky attended Saint Joseph Regional High School in Montvale, New Jersey, graduating in 2013. Initially, he was a center fielder, and in 2011 he preferred playing the outfield. He was the Gatorade New Jersey Baseball Player of the Year, and the Star-Ledger New Jersey Player of the Year, in both 2012 and 2013. In his junior year in 2012 he was 8-2 with a 0.20 earned run average (ERA), struck out 103 batters and walked 20 in 53 innings, and pitched three no-hitters and three one-hitters. He was also named to the USA Today All-USA Team.

In his senior year in 2013 Kaminsky was 10-0 with a 0.10 ERA, averaged two strikeouts per inning, gave up 14 walks as he struck out 126 in 64 innings, pitched three no-hitters and three one-hitters, while batting .506 with 3 home runs and 19 RBIs. He was also a Baseball America Preseason First Team All-American and a Rawlings-Perfect Game First Team All-American. Seattle Mariners scout Frank Rendini said: "He has a major-league curveball right now."

While in high school, Kaminsky raised over $30,000 through his Strikeout Challenge charity for the pediatric cancer ward at Englewood Hospital, as he asked supporters to donate whatever amount they chose for each strikeout he recorded in his senior year.

== Career ==
=== St. Louis Cardinals ===
Kaminsky was drafted by the St. Louis Cardinals at the age of 18 in the first round of the 2013 Major League Baseball draft, 28th overall, after Baseball America ranked him the # 21 prospect in the draft. He became the 12th New Jersey player drafted in the first round directly out of high school since the initial Major League Baseball draft in 1965. He signed for a signing bonus of $1.785 million, foregoing his scholarship to pitch and play center field for the University of North Carolina Tar Heels.

In 2013 he made his professional debut for the Gulf Coast Cardinals in the Rookie Gulf Coast League. Kaminsky appeared in eight games with five starts and had a 3.68 ERA and 28 strikeouts in 22 innings pitched. Baseball America ranked him the Gulf Coast League's No. 8 prospect in 2013. Kaminsky pitched in 2014 for the Peoria Chiefs of the Single–A Midwest League In 2014, he appeared in 18 games, all starts, going 8-2 with a 1.88 ERA (the best ERA in the league of all pitchers with 100 or more innings pitched), and a 1.013 WHIP (9th among Cardinals minor leaguers). He was named a Baseball America Low–A All Star, and Scout named him the best left-handed starter in the Cardinals' minor league system.

=== Cleveland Indians ===
On July 30, 2015, the Cardinals traded Kaminsky to the Cleveland Indians in exchange for outfielder/first baseman Brandon Moss. At the time, MLB.com ranked Kaminsky the No. 3 prospect in the St. Louis organization, and 88th overall, and Scout ranked him the best pitcher in the Cardinals' minor league system. Kaminsky finished 2015 with a 6-6 record and a 2.24 ERA. He was ranked the No. 3 prospect, and top pitching prospect, in the Cleveland Indians organization.

Kaminsky spent the 2016 season with the Akron RubberDucks of the Double-A Eastern League, where he posted an 11-7 record and a 3.28 ERA. He was placed on the disabled list with left forearm soreness after one start for Akron in 2017, and did not pitch during the remainder of the season. In 2018 Kaminsky pitched two scoreless innings for Lynchburg, and then pitched only 26.1 innings over 23 games out of the bullpen for Akron, going 1-1 with 4 saves and a 3.28 ERA. Kaminsky then pitched for the Glendale Desert Dogs in the Arizona Fall League, was picked for the league's Fall Stars Game. In 2019, he pitched for both Akron, for whom he was 2-1 with a 2.30 ERA in 31 1/3 innings, and for the Triple-A Columbus Clippers, for whom Kaminsky was 1-0 with a 5.11 ERA in 24 2/3 innings.

Kaminsky elected minor league free agency on November 4, 2019. The day he became a minor league free agent, the Cardinals made him an offer.

=== St. Louis Cardinals (second stint) ===
On December 12, 2019, Kaminsky signed a minor league deal with the St. Louis Cardinals, and was invited to major league spring training as a non-roster player. In July 2020 he was added to the Cardinals' 60-player roster pool. On August 15, 2020, Kaminsky was promoted to the major leagues for the first time. He made his major league debut for the Cardinals on August 16. Kaminsky was designated for assignment by the Cardinals on September 16; he cleared waivers, remained in the organization, and was outrighted by the Cardinals to their alternate site.

=== Philadelphia Phillies ===
On April 18, 2021, Kaminsky signed a minor league contract with the Philadelphia Phillies organization. In his lone appearance for the Triple-A Lehigh Valley IronPigs, Kaminsky struck out 2 over one scoreless inning. On August 5, Kaminsky was released by the Phillies organization.

=== Seattle Mariners ===
On April 6, 2022, Kaminsky signed a minor league contract with the Seattle Mariners organization. Pitching for the Double-A Arkansas Travelers in 2022, he was 3-1 with one save, a 4.91 ERA, and 39 strikeouts across 39 relief appearances covering 36 2/3 innings. Kaminsky elected free agency following the season on November 10.

On April 14, 2023, Kaminsky re-signed with the Mariners on a minor league contract. He split the year between the Triple-A Tacoma Rainiers, Arkansas, and rookie–level Arizona Complex League Mariners, for whom he was a combined 6-1 with a 5.13 ERA in 32 games (2 starts) in which he pitched 40 1/3 innings. He elected free agency on November 6.

=== Staten Island FerryHawks ===
On June 2, 2024, Kaminsky signed with the Staten Island FerryHawks of the Atlantic League of Professional Baseball. He made 2 starts for Staten Island, logging a 6.75 ERA with 5 strikeouts across 6 2/3 innings pitched.

=== Seattle Mariners (second stint) ===
On June 17, 2024, Kaminsky signed a minor league contract with the Seattle Mariners. In 15 appearances for the Triple-A Tacoma Rainiers, he struggled to a 7.66 ERA with 45 strikeouts across 47 innings pitched. Kaminsky elected free agency following the season on November 4.

=== St. Louis Cardinals (third stint) ===
On February 9, 2025, Kaminsky signed a minor league contract with the St. Louis Cardinals. He made three scoreless appearances split between the rookie-level Florida Complex League Cardinals and Triple-A Memphis Redbirds, recording seven strikeouts over four innings. Kaminsky was released by the Cardinals organization on June 2.

=== Staten Island FerryHawks (second stint) ===
On August 13, 2025, Kaminsky signed with the Staten Island FerryHawks of the Atlantic League of Professional Baseball. Kaminsky made six starts for Staten Island, compiling an 0-3 record and 5.60 ERA with 11 strikeouts across 17 2/3 innings pitched. He became a free agent following the season.

=== Los Angeles Angels ===
On May 10, 2026, Kaminsky signed a minor league contract with the Los Angeles Angels organization. In 39 games (2 starts) between Triple-A and rookie ball he threw 50 innings going 1-2 with a 3.96 ERA with 39 strikeouts and one save. He elected free agency on November 2.

== International career ==
Kaminsky played for the Team Israel in the 2023 World Baseball Classic.

== See also ==
- List of Jewish Major League Baseball players
