= 1999 Major League Baseball draft =

Baseball draft of amateur players for Major League Baseball

General information
- Date: June 2–3, 1999

Overview
- First selection: Josh Hamilton; Tampa Bay Devil Rays

The 1999 Major League Baseball draft, was the annual choosing of high school and college baseball players, held on June 2 and 3, 1999. A total of 1,474 players were drafted over the course of 50 rounds.

== First round selections ==
= All-Star

Pick	Player	Team	Position	School
1	Josh Hamilton	Tampa Bay Devil Rays	OF	Athens Drive High School (NC)
2	Josh Beckett	Florida Marlins	P	Spring High School (TX)
3	Eric Munson	Detroit Tigers	C	USC
4	Corey Myers	Arizona Diamondbacks	SS	Desert Vista High School (AZ)
5	B.J. Garbe	Minnesota Twins	OF, P	Moses Lake High School (WA)
6	Josh Girdley	Montreal Expos	P	Jasper High School (TX)
7	Kyle Snyder	Kansas City Royals	P	North Carolina
8	Bobby Bradley	Pittsburgh Pirates	P	Wellington High School (FL)
9	Barry Zito	Oakland Athletics	P	USC
10	Ben Sheets	Milwaukee Brewers	P	UL-Monroe
11	Ryan Christianson	Seattle Mariners	C	Arlington High School (CA)
12	Brett Myers	Philadelphia Phillies	P	Englewood Senior High School (FL)
13	Mike Paradis	Baltimore Orioles	P	Clemson
14	Ty Howington	Cincinnati Reds	P	Hudson's Bay High School (WA)
15	Jason Stumm	Chicago White Sox	P	Centralia High School (WA)
16	Jason Jennings	Colorado Rockies	P	Baylor
17	Rick Asadoorian	Boston Red Sox (Note: Pick from Anaheim Angels as compensation for signing of free agent Mo Vaughn)	OF	Northbridge High School (MA)
18	Richard Stahl	Baltimore Orioles (Note: Pick from St. Louis Cardinals as compensation for signing of free agent Eric Davis)	P	Newton High School (GA)
19	Alex Ríos	Toronto Blue Jays	OF	San Pedro Martin High School (PR))
20	Vince Faison	San Diego Padres (Note: Pick from Los Angeles Dodgers as compensation for signing of free agent Kevin Brown)	OF	Toombs County High School (GA)
21	Larry Bigbie	Baltimore Orioles (Note: Pick from Texas Rangers as compensation for signing of free agent Rafael Palmeiro)	OF	Ball State
22	Matt Ginter	Chicago White Sox (Note: Pick from New York Mets as compensation for signing of free agent Robin Ventura)	P	Mississippi State
23	Keith Reed	Baltimore Orioles (Note: Pick from Cleveland Indians as compensation for signing of free agent Roberto Alomar)	OF	Providence
24	Kurt Ainsworth	San Francisco Giants	P	LSU
25	Mike MacDougal	Kansas City Royals (Note: Pick from Boston Red Sox as compensation for signing of free agent Jose Offerman)	P	Wake Forest
26	Ben Christensen	Chicago Cubs	P	Wichita State
27	David Walling	New York Yankees	P	Arkansas
28	Gerik Baxter	San Diego Padres	P	Edmonds Woodway High School (WA)
29	Omar Ortíz	San Diego Padres (Note: Pick from Houston Astros as compensation for signing of free agent Ken Caminiti)	P	Texas-Pan American
30	Chance Caple	St. Louis Cardinals (Note: Pick from Atlanta Braves as compensation for signing of free agent Brian Jordan)	P	Texas A&M

== Supplemental first round selections ==
Pick	Player	Team	Position	School
31	Casey Daigle	Arizona Diamondbacks (Note: Supplemental pick for loss of free agent Devon White)	P	Sulphur High School (LA)
32	Jay Gehrke	Kansas City Royals (Note: Supplemental pick for loss of free agent Jose Offerman)	P	Pepperdine
33	Jeff Heaverlo	Seattle Mariners (Note: Supplemental pick for loss of free agent Mike Timlin)	P	Washington
34	Joshua Cenate	Baltimore Orioles (Note: Supplemental pick for loss of free agent Roberto Alomar)	P	Jefferson High School (WV)
35	Brian West	Chicago White Sox (Note: Supplemental pick for loss of free agent Albert Belle)	P	West Monroe High School (LA)
36	Nick Stocks	St. Louis Cardinals (Note: Supplemental pick for loss of free agent Brian Jordan)	P	Florida State
37	Jason Repko	Los Angeles Dodgers (Note: Supplemental pick for loss of free agent Scott Radinsky)	OF	Hanford High School (WA)
38	Colby Lewis	Texas Rangers (Note: Supplemental pick for loss of free agent Todd Stottlemyre)	P	Bakersfield College
39	Jerome Williams	San Francisco Giants (Note: Supplemental pick for loss of free agent José Mesa)	P	Waipahu High School (HI)
40	Brad Baker	Boston Red Sox (Note: Supplemental pick for loss of free agent Mo Vaughn)	P	Pioneer Valley Regional School (MA)
41	Casey Burns	San Diego Padres (Note: Supplemental pick for loss of free agent Kevin Brown)	P	Richmond
42	Mike Rosamond	Houston Astros (Note: Supplemental pick for loss of free agent Randy Johnson)	SS	Ole Miss
43	Jimmy Gobble	Kansas City Royals (Note: Supplemental pick for loss of free agent Dean Palmer)	P	John S. Battle High School (VA)
44	Scott Rice	Baltimore Orioles (Note: Supplemental pick for loss of free agent Eric Davis)	P	Royal High School (CA)
45	Rob Purvis	Chicago White Sox (Note: Supplemental pick for loss of free agent Robin Ventura)	P	Bradley
46	Chris Duncan	St. Louis Cardinals (Note: Supplemental pick for loss of free agent Delino DeShields)	1B	Canyon del Oro High School (AZ)
47	Mike Mead	Texas Rangers (Note: Supplemental pick for loss of free agent Will Clark)	P	Soddy Daisy High School (TN)
48	Casey Fossum	Boston Red Sox (Note: Supplemental pick for loss of free agent Greg Swindell)	P	Texas A&M
49	Mike Bynum	San Diego Padres (Note: Supplemental pick for loss of free agent Ken Caminiti)	P	North Carolina
50	Brian Roberts	Baltimore Orioles (Note: Supplemental pick for loss of free agent Rafael Palmeiro)	SS	South Carolina
51	Nick Trzesniak	San Diego Padres (Note: Supplemental pick for loss of free agent Steve Finley)	C	Victor J. Andrew High School (IL)

== Other notable players ==
- Carl Crawford, 2nd round, 52nd overall by the Tampa Bay Devil Rays (All-Star)
- Brandon Phillips, 2nd round, 57th overall by the Montreal Expos (All-Star)
- Ryan Doumit, 2nd round, 59th overall by the Pittsburgh Pirates
- Ryan Ludwick, 2nd round, 60th overall by the Oakland Athletics (All-Star)
- John Lackey, 2nd round, 68th overall by the Anaheim Angels (All-Star)
- Jack Taschner, 2nd round, 75th overall by the San Francisco Giants
- Justin Morneau, 3rd round, 89th overall by the Minnesota Twins (All-Star)
- Willie Bloomquist, 3rd round, 95th overall by the Seattle Mariners
- Jon Rauch, 3rd round, 99th overall by the Chicago White Sox
- Josh Bard, 3rd round, 100th overall by the Colorado Rockies
- Hank Blalock, 3rd round, 105th overall by the Texas Rangers (All-Star)
- Cody Ross, 4th round, 117th overall by the Detroit Tigers
- Kevin Mench, 4th round, 118th overall by the Texas Rangers
- Ángel Pagán, 4th round, 136th overall by the New York Mets
- Alec Zumwalt, 4th round, 144th overall by the Atlanta Braves
- Nate Robertson, 5th round, 146th overall by the Florida Marlins
- Joe Saunders, 5th round, 156th overall by the Philadelphia Phillies, but did not sign (All-Star)
- J. J. Putz, 6th round, 185th overall by the Seattle Mariners (All-Star)
- Érik Bédard, 6th round, 187th overall by the Baltimore Orioles
- Shane Victorino, 6th round, 194th overall by the Los Angeles Dodgers (All-Star)
- Aaron Harang, 6th round, 195th overall by the Texas Rangers
- Coco Crisp, 7th round, 222nd overall by the St. Louis Cardinals
- Chris Capuano, 8th round, 238th overall by the Arizona Diamondbacks (All-Star)
- Mark Ellis, 9th round, 271st overall by the Kansas City Royals
- Marlon Byrd, 10th round, 306th overall by the Philadelphia Phillies (All-Star)
- Matt Guerrier, 10th round, 309th overall by the Chicago White Sox
- Greg Dobbs, 10th round, 323rd overall by the Houston Astros, but did not sign
- Lew Ford, 12th round, 379th overall by the Boston Red Sox
- Albert Pujols, 13th round, 402nd overall by the St. Louis Cardinals (All-Star)
- Brandon Lyon, 14th round, 433rd overall by the Toronto Blue Jays
- Garrett Jones, 14th round, 444th overall by the Atlanta Braves
- Jake Peavy, 15th round, 472nd overall by the San Diego Padres (All-Star)
- Matt Diaz, 17th round, 505th overall by the Tampa Bay Devil Rays
- Reed Johnson, 17th round, 523rd overall by the Toronto Blue Jays
- Ryan Raburn, 18th round, 535th overall by the Tampa Bay Devil Rays, but did not sign
- Lyle Overbay, 18th round, 538th overall by the Arizona Diamondbacks
- Scott Hairston, 18th round, 549th overall by the Chicago White Sox, but did not sign
- Noah Lowry, 19th round, 585th overall by the Texas Rangers, but did not sign
- Willie Harris, 24th round, 727th overall by the Baltimore Orioles
- Jason Frasor, 33rd round, 1145th overall by the Detroit Tigers
- Rich Harden, 38th round, 987th overall by the Seattle Mariners, but did not sign
- Mike Jacobs, 38th round, 1156th overall by the New York Mets
- Kameron Loe, 39th round, 1176th overall by the Philadelphia Phillies, but did not sign
- Adam LaRoche, 42nd round, 1254th overall by the Florida Marlins, but did not sign
- Chris Snyder, 43rd round, 1290th overall by the Seattle Mariners, but did not sign
- Pat Neshek, 45th round, 1337th overall by the Minnesota Twins, but did not sign

=== NFL players drafted ===
- Michael Bishop, 44th round, 1328th overall by the Cleveland Indians, but did not sign

== See also ==
- Major League Baseball
- Major League Baseball draft
- List of MLB first overall draft choices
- Rule 5 draft

Preceded by Pat Burrell	1st Overall Picks; Josh Hamilton	Succeeded by Adrián González
