= Bobby Bradley (pitcher) =

American baseball player (born 1980)

- Pitcher
- Born: December 15, 1980 (age 45); West Palm Beach, Florida, U.S.
- Bats: Right Throws: Right
- Stats at Baseball Reference

Robert Leonard Bradley (born December 15, 1980) is an American former professional baseball pitcher.

== Career ==
=== Pittsburgh Pirates ===
Bradley attended Wellington Community High School in Wellington, Florida, where he was named a High School All-American. He was chosen by the Pittsburgh Pirates with the eighth overall selection in the 1999 Major League Baseball draft. Though he signed a letter of intent with Florida State University, Bradley signed with the Pirates for a $2.3 million bonus.

Bradley participated in the All-Star Futures Game in 2000. Prior to the 2001 season, Baseball America rated Bradley as the #20 prospect in baseball. However, Bradley suffered many injuries. He required arthroscopic surgery in June 2001, and missed the remainder of the season. Though he required Tommy John surgery in October and missed the 2002 season as a result, he was nevertheless added to the 40-man roster following the season in order to be protected from the Rule 5 draft. Bradley required surgery again in 2003. Bradley struggled when he reached Triple-A with the Indianapolis Indians in 2005, and he was unconditionally released to make room on the roster for Zach Duke.

=== Florida Marlins ===
Bradley went to camp with the Florida Marlins organization in 2006, but left after one day.
