= Doug Million =

American baseball player (1975–1997)

- Million pitching for Sarasota High School
- Pitcher
- Born: October 13, 1975; Fort Thomas, Kentucky
- Died: September 23, 1997 (aged 21); Mesa, Arizona
- Batted: Left Threw: Left
- Stats at Baseball Reference

Douglas Lloyd Million (October 13, 1975 – September 23, 1997) was an American baseball player who is notable for winning the Gatorade High School Baseball Player of the Year Award in 1994. He played minor league baseball for four seasons, and died during his fourth season aged 21, shortly after suffering a severe asthma attack.

== Draft and professional career ==
Million was drafted by the Colorado Rockies in the first round (seventh overall) of the 1994 amateur draft out of Sarasota High School. He began his professional career that year, splitting the season between the Arizona League Rockies and Bend Rockies, going a combined 6–3 with a 2.20 ERA while striking out 92 batters in 69 2/3 innings of work.

According to the Baseball America pre-1995 rankings, Million was the 19th best prospect in the minor leagues. With the Salem Avalanche in 1995, he went 5–7 with a 4.62 ERA in 24 games (23 starts).

He was the 69th best prospect according to the Baseball America pre-1996 rankings. He split that year between the Avalanche and New Haven Ravens, going a combined 10–8 with a 2.74 ERA in 27 games (26 starts).

In 1997, Million pitched for the Avalanche and Ravens, going a combined 5–14 with a 6.32 ERA in 28 games (27 starts).

Overall, he went 26–32 with a 4.12 ERA in 92 minor league games pitched.

== Death ==
While playing an electronic trivia game with a teammate, Million suffered a severe asthma attack and died shortly afterward.

== See also ==
- List of baseball players who died during their careers
