= Sarasota High School =

Public high school in Sarasota, Florida, United States

Location
- 1000 South School Avenue; Sarasota, Florida; United States

Information
- School type: Public High School
- Opened: 1913, 113 years ago
- Status: Open
- School board: Sarasota County S.B.
- School district: Sarasota County Schools
- Principal: David Jones
- Staff: 124.00 (FTE)
- Grades: 9–12
- Enrollment: 2,509 (2023-2024)
- Student to teacher ratio: 20.23
- Colors: Black & Orange
- Athletics: Yes
- Mascot: Sailor Sam
- Rivals: Riverview
- Yearbook: Sailor's Log
- Information: (941) 955-0181
- Website: Sarasota High School

- Paul Rudolph Sarasota High School Addition
- U.S. National Register of Historic Places
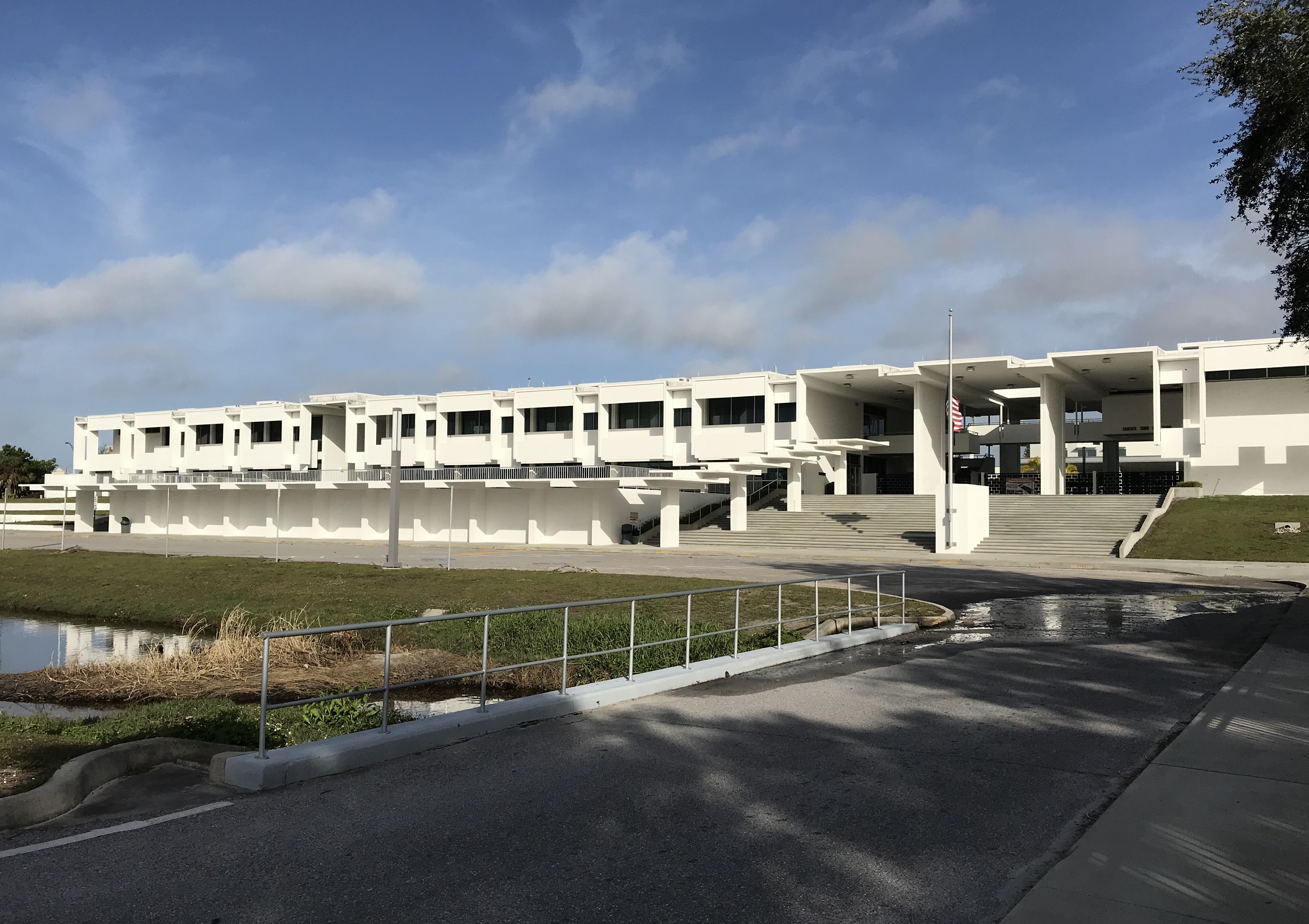
- Sarasota High School Addition

- Location within Florida Location within the United States
- Location: Sarasota, Florida
- Built: 1958–59
- Architect: Paul Rudolph
- MPS: Sarasota School of Architecture MPS
- NRHP reference No.: 12000365
- Added to NRHP: June 27, 2012

- Old Sarasota High School
- U.S. National Register of Historic Places
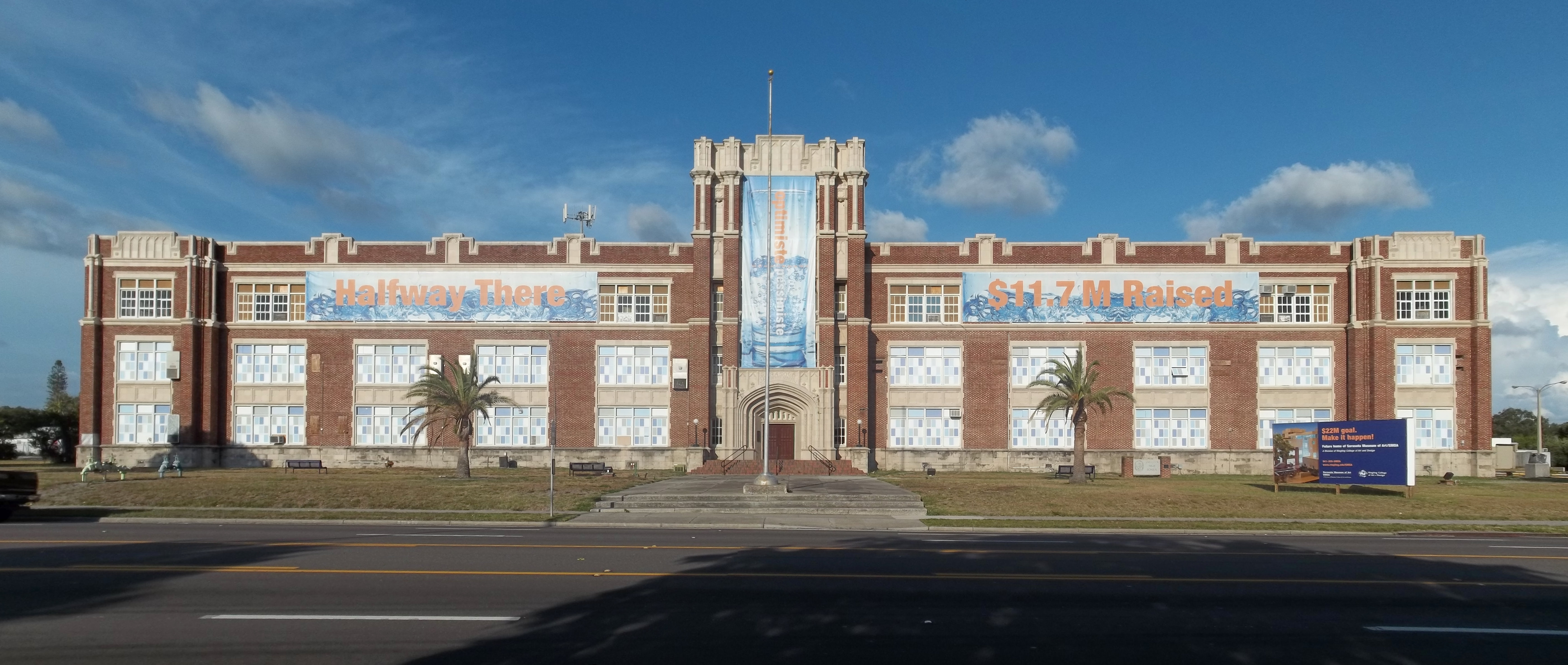
- Coordinates: 27°19′30″N 82°31′46″W
- Area: 1 acre (0.40 ha)
- Built: 1926
- Architect: M. Leo Elliott, T. A. Monk
- Architectural style: Late Gothic Revival
- MPS: Sarasota MRA
- NRHP reference No.: 84003844
- Added to NRHP: March 22, 1984

Sarasota High School is a public high school of the Sarasota County Public Schools in Sarasota, Florida, United States, a city by the Gulf of Mexico. The school colors are black and orange and the mascot is a sailor. The school was segregated and no African Americans allowed to attend until desegregation.

== History ==
=== Old Sarasota High School ===
==== Architecture ====
Old Sarasota High School was designed by architect M. Leo Elliott in 1926. The school was completed in 1927 and the first senior class graduated in 1928.

Made of red brick and glazed terra cotta, the Late Gothic Revival building was set on a high base of limestone and concrete laid in imitation of limestone. It has three stories with a 4½-story entrance tower building. The rectangular, irregular plan masonry wall structure is typical of the Collegiate Gothic style, which was popular at the time. The interior features other Gothic Revival motifs like coats of arms, quatrefoils, and arched ceilings which dominate the hallways and entryway.

Local historians describe the architecture's impressive artistry: "The massive tower entrance to the school on U.S. 41 features brick pier buttresses, which terminated at the top of the tower projection in glazed terra cotta cluster columns. Ornate crocket projections formerly pierced the skyline, but were removed at an unknown date. The tower was ornamented with various combinations of colonettes, crockets, tracery, quatrefoils and bosses, all Gothic Revival motifs, executed in ornamental glazed terra cotta."

==== Construction ====
The construction of Sarasota High School was part of a county-wide program which included the erection of South Side School and Bay Haven School. The school expansion program coincided with the land "Boom" upward rise of real estate prices; as a result, the high school site was purchased for $317,000. In The Story of Sarasota, author Karl Grismer commented that the "tract upon which the school was located, cost more than the Florida Mortgage and Investment Company, Ltd., paid for the entire site of Sarasota - and 50,000 acres beside - in 1885!" Bond issues in excess of $1,500,000 were used to float the land acquisition, construction and operating costs required by the school expansion program.

==== Conversion into the Sarasota Art Museum ====
After closing the building in 1996, the building was shuttered for many years and left neglected. There were rumors of toxic asbestos and public uproar always followed any attempt to demolish the building. In 2003, plans began to repurpose the building for use as an art museum.

Initial plans for conversion into the Sarasota Art Museum had been put on hold for a number of years, but the Sarasota Art Museum of Ringling College of Art and Design opened to the public on December 15, 2019.

=== Current campus ===
The current campus, consisting of two buildings — a 60,000-square-foot (5,600 m^{2}) 1926 Collegiate Gothic structure designed by M. Leo Elliott and a 20,000-square-foot (1,900 m^{2}) mid-century building by Paul Rudolph added in 1958-1959.

Finally, in 1996, the school expanded to its current size of 85 acres (0.34 km^{2}), and classes began to move out of the old Sarasota High building. The adaptive reuse project by Lawson Group Architects transformed the building into the Ringling College Museum.

==== Architecture - Paul Rudolph Addition ====
In 1958, American architect Paul Rudolph began to design a new Sarasota High School building to expand on the Collegiate Gothic building. To contrast the steel complex design that was just completed at Riverview High, Rudolph designed the new addition as a composition of folding concrete planes. He developed a system of horizontal plates and vertical piers to work well with the local Sarasota climate, which included providing natural ventilation to classrooms by placing them along an open-air axis. This design resulted in Rudolph receiving the prestigious Award of Merit from the American Institute of Architects Honor Awards Program in 1962.

In June 2008, the Sarasota County School Board made the decision to demolish Rudolph's nearby Riverview High School. In response to this, they later authored a memorandum stipulating that they would “appropriately rehabilitate” the Rudolph Addition at SHS. However, in 2012 when the School Board choose to move forward with a reconstruction plan, it was clear that Paul Rudolph’s design would be significantly changed. This led the Sarasota Architectural Foundation (SAF) to initiate a campaign advocating for a more appropriate rehabilitation. On June 26, 2012, Paul Rudolph’s SHS Addition was listed on the National Register of Historic Places.

Completed in 2015, Harvard Jolly Architecture and Jonathan Parks AIA led the adaptive reuse project. After 50 years as classrooms, it was repurposed to become the “front door” of the entire campus and the home of the administrative offices. A new gate addresses the character of history without being beholden to it. The result is an unadorned update that honors Rudolph's original design – recognized with multiple awards including one from AIA Florida in 2016 and Docomomo's 2021 Modernism in America Awards.

== Sports ==
Sarasota High School offers numerous sports at the Freshman, JV, and Varsity levels. These sports include cheerleading, marching band, swimming & diving, track & field, wrestling, weight lifting, cross country, basketball, football, softball, golf, sailing, soccer, lacrosse, and baseball.

== Sailor Circus ==
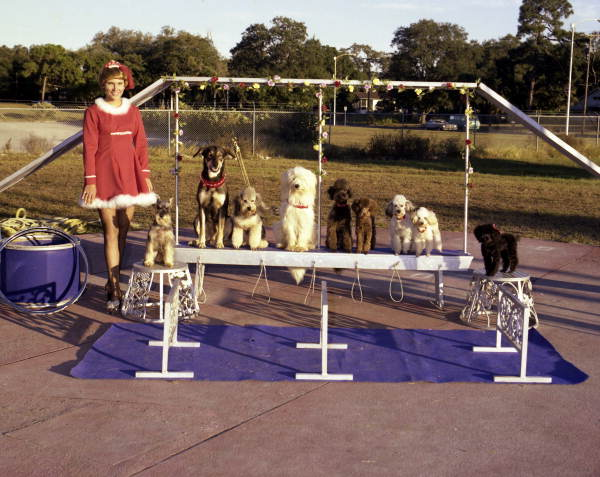
Dog act in the Sailor Circus, 1977.

The world-famous Sarasota High School Sailor Circus began as a mid-game tumbling demonstration during a football game in 1949. The Sailor Circus held their first performance in 1950 as an extension of the PE class at the high school. In celebration of the Circus' 20th anniversary in 1969, the Sailor Circus relocated to an arena right outside the school campus.

It has evolved into a near full-fledged circus of student performers trained and supervised by faculty and parents, some of which are or were professional circus performers. The Sailor Circus has appeared on numerous television programs and has traveled throughout the United States, Japan and Peru. In 1952, Warner Brothers made a 30-minute short on the Sailor Circus which was shown in theaters throughout North America. Through an agreement with Ringling Brothers Barnum and Bailey Combined Shows, Inc. (Ringling having a long association with Sarasota), the Sailor Circus is officially known as "The Greatest Little Show On Earth".

In 2008, the Sarasota County School Board dropped Sailor Circus due to "safety hazard" and the Sailor Circus was picked up by The Police Athletic League (P.A.L.) of Sarasota ran by the Sherriff's Office. 2009 was the mark of the 60th anniversary of Sailor circus, which is no longer affiliated with Sarasota High School. In 2013 the Circus Arts Conservatory bought the Sailor Circus Arena and turned it into Sailor Circus Academy for pre-professional development all the way through age 21.

== Campus ==
The school currently has over 2,600 students with 139 teachers and faculty. The campus featuring 19 buildings (5 of them being 2 stories) and 10 portable units (each containing one classroom). There are 2 cafeterias, 2 gymnasiums, 2 locker rooms, a professional weight training room, an auditorium with stage and dressing rooms, a circus arena, 8 tennis courts, 2 baseball/softball diamonds, a football stadium with a track surrounding it, and a soccer field, and 4 parking lots.

Sarasota High features a 1-mile walking path around and through the school.

== AICE ==
In the 2011–2012 school year, Sarasota High School started the magnet program AICE, the Advanced International Certificate of Education, a program from Cambridge University in the United Kingdom. The program is new to Florida, but is common through the rest of the world. One of the main reasons of bringing the AICE program to Sarasota High, was to keep the college bound students districted to Sarasota High from going to the International Baccalaureate magnet program at Riverview High School. The goal of the program is to allow students to choose the amount of college prep classes they want, from 1 to all their core classes. The program has 3 main groups (Languages, Humanities and Arts, and Math and Science) and a student will need to take an AICE exam in 6 AICE classes to get a test in each of the 3 groups, and then the other 3 from any area. Students begin taking AICE classes in 9th grade. They take Pre-AICE classes in 9th and some of 10th grade. Sarasota High has replaced honors classes with Pre-AICE classes. A student can get up to 45 college credits with AICE compared with only 10 credits in IB at Riverview High School. If a student completes 100 hours of community service, a student can also receive 100% of the Bright Futures Scholarship Program.

== Foreign languages ==
Sarasota High School offers students the chance to learn Spanish or American Sign Language. Latin used to be offered. Although not a requirement of graduation in Florida, 2 years of a foreign language is required for admission into a state university.

== Arts ==
Sarasota High School has a band, choir, color guard, and drama guild. The band and color guard performs at all the football games and the drama guild also put on plays.

== Notable alumni ==
- Fredd Atkins, first African-American mayor of Sarasota and longtime city commissioner
- Joe Ayrault – former professional baseball player (Atlanta Braves) and current minor league manager of the Brevard County Manatees
- Paul Azinger – professional golfer, 1993 PGA Championship winner and winning captain of 2008 Ryder Cup team
- Greg Blosser - former professional baseball player (Boston Red Sox)
- Joe Cash – world champion water skier
- Doug Corbett – former professional baseball player (Minnesota Twins, California Angels, Baltimore Orioles)
- David Daniels – former professional American football player (Seattle Seahawks)
- Ian Desmond – MLB shortstop for the Colorado Rockies
- Jimmy DuBose – former professional football player (Tampa Bay Buccaneers), 1975 SEC Player of the Year,
- Page Dunlap – professional golfer on the LPGA Tour and 1986 NCAA women's champion
- Scott Dunlap – professional golfer on the Champions Tour, class of 1981 valedictorian
- Ken Forssi – bassist with Love, graduated 1962
- Adrian Garrett – former professional baseball player, first Sarasota High alum in MLB (Atlanta Braves, Chicago Cubs, Oakland Athletics, California Angels)
- Wayne Garrett – former professional baseball player (New York Mets, Montreal Expos, St. Louis Cardinals)
- Scooter Gennett – professional baseball player for the Cincinnati Reds
- John-Ford Griffin – former professional baseball player (Toronto Blue Jays)
- Herb Haygood – former professional American football player (Denver Broncos) and college coach graduated 1997
- Dorothy Hosmer - photographer and travel writer, known as the first woman freelance contributor to the National Geographic magazine
- James Houser - former professional baseball player (Florida Marlins)
- Tim Johnson, former professional American football player (Pittsburgh Steelers)
- Casey Kelly – professional baseball player
- Chris Klaus – technology entrepreneur, founder of Internet Security Systems
- Derek Lilliquist – former professional baseball player (Atlanta Braves, San Diego Padres, Cleveland Indians, Boston Red Sox, Cincinnati Reds)
- Jason Miller – former professional baseball player (Minnesota Twins)
- Doug Million – former high school pitcher of the year and first round draft pick
- Mark Pauline – performance artist, graduated 1970
- Irvin Phillips, former professional American football player (San Diego Chargers)
- Paul Piurowski, former professional American football player (Tampa Bay Bandits)
- Ed Price – state legislator, graduated 1936
- Barry Redden, former professional American football player (Los Angeles Rams)
- Dallas Roberts - actor
- Paul Rubenfeld, aka Pee-Wee Herman – actor, graduated 1970
- Cedric Saunders, former professional American football player (Tampa Bay Buccaneers) and Vice President of Football Operations for the Detroit Lions, graduated 1990
- Bobby Seay – former professional baseball player (Tampa Bay Devil Rays, Colorado Rockies, Detroit Tigers)
- Eric Skoglund – MLB pitcher for Kansas City Royals
- Joey Terdoslavich – professional baseball player (Pittsburgh Pirates), graduated 2007
- Skippy Whitaker – retired basketball player (Boston Celtics)
- Hugh Yancy – former professional baseball player (Chicago White Sox)
