= B. J. Garbe =

American baseball player

Brandon James Garbe (born February 3, 1981, in Moses Lake, Washington) is an American former minor league baseball player. Garbe was selected by the Minnesota Twins fifth overall in the 1999 amateur draft. Over the course of his 8-year minor league career, he played in the minor leagues for the Twins', Mariners', and Marlins' organisations. Overall, he hit .235 in 722 games over his career.

== Early life and education ==
Garbe attended Moses Lake High School, where he played football and baseball and graduated in 1999. As a senior, he made the all state team as quarterback. The same year, Garbe won the Gatorade High School Baseball Player of the Year Award.

== Career ==
Garbe was selected fifth overall by the Minnesota Twins in the 1999 amateur draft out of Moses Lake High School. He began his professional career that season, hitting .316 in 41 games for the Elizabethton Twins. That would be the only time he'd ever hit above .275 in a professional season.

In 2000, he hit only .233 in 133 games for the Quad Cities River Bandits, and in 2001 he hit only .242 in 127 games for the Fort Myers Miracle. With the Miracle again in 2002, he hit only .239 in 115 games.

Garbe split the 2003 season between the GCL Twins (eight games) and New Britain Rock Cats (66 games), hitting a combined .181. He began the 2004 season with the Rock Cats, hitting .201 in 114 games with them. On August 31, he was traded to the Seattle Mariners for Pat Borders. He spent three games in the Mariners organization that year, hitting .375 in nine at-bats with the San Antonio Missions. He hit .204 overall that year.

In 2005, Garbe hit .275 in 80 games for the Inland Empire 66ers. He wound up in the Florida Marlins organization in 2006, hitting .184 in 35 games with the Carolina Mudcats.

Overall, he hit .235 in 722 games over an eight-year career.

== Awards and honours ==
In 1999, Garbe won the Gatorade High School Baseball Player of the Year Award.

In 2020, Garbe was inducted into the Washington Interscholastic Athletic Association Hall of Fame.

== Personal life ==
Garbe is married with one son and one daughter. In 2020, he working as CEO of a construction company in his hometown of Moses Lake.
